= List of members of the 11th Provincial Assembly of Balochistan =

This is the list of current members of the Provincial Assembly of Balochistan elected following the 2018 provincial election.

The 11th Provincial Assembly was dissolved on 12 August 2023 by Governor Abdul Wali Kakar on the advice of Chief Minister Abdul Quddus Bizenjo.

== Members ==
Constituency	Party	Member	Assumed office	Reference
PB-1 Musakhel-cum-Sherani	Pakistan Tehreek-e-Insaf	Sardar Babar Khan Musakhel	13 August 2018	
PB-2 Zhob	Balochistan Awami Party	Mitha Khan Kakar	13 August 2018	
PB-3 Killa Saifullah	Muttahida Majlis-e-Amal	Maulana Noorullah	13 August 2018	
PB-4 Loralai	Balochistan Awami Party	Muhammad Khan Toor Utmankhail	13 August 2018	
PB-5 Dukki	Balochistan Awami Party	Sardar Masood Ali Khan Luni	13 August 2018	
PB-6 Ziarat-cum-Harnai	Balochistan Awami Party	Noor Muhammad Dummar	13 August 2018	
PB-7 Sibbi-cum-Lehri	Balochistan Awami Party	Mir Sarfraz Chakar Domki	13 August 2018	
PB-8 Barkhan	Balochistan Awami Party	Sardar Abdul Rehman Khetran	13 August 2018	
PB-9 Kohlu	Pakistan Tehreek-e-Insaf	Mir Naseebullah Khan	13 August 2018	
PB-10 Dera Bugti	Jamhoori Wattan Party	Gohram Bugti	13 August 2018	
PB-11 Nasirabad-I	Balochistan Awami Party	Mir Sikandar Ali	13 August 2018	
PB-12 Nasirabad-II	Balochistan Awami Party	Muhammad Khan Lehri	13 August 2018	
PB-13 Jafarabad-I	Pakistan Tehreek-e-Insaf	Umar Khan Jamali	13 August 2018	
PB-14 Jafarabad-II	Balochistan Awami Party	Jan Mohammad Jamali	13 August 2018	
PB-15 Sohbatpur	Balochistan Awami Party	Mir Saleem Ahmed Khoso	13 August 2018	
PB-16 Jhal Magsi-cum-Kachhi	Balochistan Awami Party	Nawabzada Tariq Magsi	13 August 2018	
PB-17 Kachhi-cum-Mastung	Pakistan Tehreek-e-Insaf	Yar Muhammad Rind	13 August 2018	
PB-18 Pishin-I	Muttahida Majlis-e-Amal	Abdul Wahid Siddique	13 August 2018	
PB-19 Pishin-II	Muttahida Majlis-e-Amal	Asghar Ali Tareen	13 August 2018	
PB-20 Pishin-III	Muttahida Majlis-e-Amal	Syed Azizullah	26 February 2021	
PB-21 Killa Abdullah-I	Awami National Party	Zmrak Khan	13 August 2018	
PB-22 Killa Abdullah-II	Muttahida Majlis-e-Amal	Muhammad Nawaz Khan Kakar	13 August 2018	
PB-23 Killa Abdullah-III	Awami National Party	Asghar Khan Achakzai	13 August 2018	
PB-24 Quetta-I	Awami National Party	Malik Naeem Khan Bazai	13 August 2018	
PB-25 Quetta-II	Muttahida Majlis-e-Amal	Malik Sikandar Khan	13 August 2018	
PB-26 Quetta-III	Hazara Democratic Party	Qadir Nayel	3 January 2019	
PB-27 Quetta-IV	Hazara Democratic Party	Abdul Khaliq Hazara	13 August 2018	
PB-28 Quetta-V	Pakistan Tehreek-e-Insaf	Muhammad Mobeen Khan	13 August 2018	
PB-29 Quetta-VI	Balochistan National Party (Mengal)	Akhtar Hussain Langove	13 August 2018	
PB-30 Quetta-VII	Balochistan National Party (Mengal)	Ahmed Nawaz Baloch	13 August 2018	
PB-31 Quetta-VIII	Pashtunkhwa Milli Awami Party	Nasrullah Khan Bareach	13 August 2018	
PB-32 Quetta-IX	Balochistan National Party (Mengal)	Malik Naseer Ahmed Shahwani	13 August 2018	
PB-33 Nushki	Balochistan National Party (Mengal)	Babu Muhammad Rahim Mengal	13 August 2018	
PB-34 Chagai	Balochistan Awami Party	Muhammad Arif	13 August 2018	
PB-35 Mastung	Independent	Aslam Raisani	30 October 2018	
PB-36 Shaheed Sikandarabad	Pakistan Tehreek-e-Insaf	Mir Naimatullah Zehri	13 August 2018	
PB-37 Kalat	Balochistan Awami Party	Mir Ziaullah Zehri	13 August 2018	
PB-38 Khuzdar-I	Pakistan Muslim League (N)	Sanaullah Zehri	13 August 2018	
PB-39 Khuzdar-II	Muttahida Majlis-e-Amal	Mir Younus Aziz Zehri	13 August 2018	
PB-40 Khuzdar-III	Balochistan National Party (Mengal)	Mir Muhammad Akbar Mengal	30 October 2018	
PB-41 Washuk	Muttahida Majlis-e-Amal	Mir Zabid Ali Reki	30 October 2018	
PB-42 Kharan	Balochistan National Party (Mengal)	Sanaullah Baloch	13 August 2018	
PB-43 Panjgur	Balochistan National Party (Awami)	Mir Asadullah Baloch	13 August 2018	
PB-44 Awaran-cum-Panjgur	Balochistan Awami Party	Abdul Quddus Bizenjo	13 August 2018	
PB-45 Kech-I	Balochistan Awami Party	Zahoor Ahmed Buledi	13 August 2018	
PB-46 Kech-II	Balochistan National Party (Awami)	Syed Ehsan Shah	13 August 2018	
PB-47 Kech-III	Balochistan Awami Party	Abdul Rauf Rind	13 August 2018	
PB-48 Kech-IV	Balochistan Awami Party	Akbar Askani	13 August 2018	
PB-49 Lasbela-I	Balochistan Awami Party	Sardar Muhammad Saleh Bhotani	13 August 2018	
PB-50 Lasbela-II	Balochistan Awami Party	Jam Kamal Khan	13 August 2018	
PB-51 Gwadar	Balochistan National Party (Mengal)	Mir Hamal Kalmati	13 August 2018	
Reserved for women	Balochistan Awami Party	Rubaba Khan Buledi	13 August 2018	
Reserved for women	Balochistan Awami Party	Laila Tareen	13 August 2018	
Reserved for women	Balochistan Awami Party	Mah Jabeen Sharan	13 August 2018	
Reserved for women	Balochistan Awami Party	Bushra Rind	13 August 2018	
Reserved for women	Muttahida Majlis-e-Amal	Bano Khalil Ahmed	13 August 2018	
Reserved for women	Muttahida Majlis-e-Amal	Zubeda Dakhtarullah	13 August 2018	
Reserved for women	Balochistan National Party (Mengal)	Zeenat Shahwani	13 August 2018	
Reserved for women	Balochistan National Party (Mengal)	Shakeela Naveed	13 August 2018	
Reserved for women	Pakistan Tehreek-e-Insaf	Fareeda Bibi	13 August 2018	
Reserved for women	Awami National Party	Shahina Kakar	13 August 2018	
Reserved for women	Balochistan National Party (Awami)	Mastoora Bibi	13 August 2018	
Reserved for Non-Muslims	Balochistan Awami Party	Khalil Francis	22 March 2021	
Reserved for Non-Muslims	Muttahida Majlis-e-Amal	Sham Lal	13 August 2018	
Reserved for Non-Muslims	Balochistan National Party (Mengal)	Titus Johnson	13 August 2018	
