= 2018 Balochistan provincial election =

Elections in Balochistan province, Pakistan

- 25 July 2018

All 65 seats in the Provincial Assembly 33 seats needed for a majority
- Opinion polls
- Turnout: 45.27% (▲3.47pp)
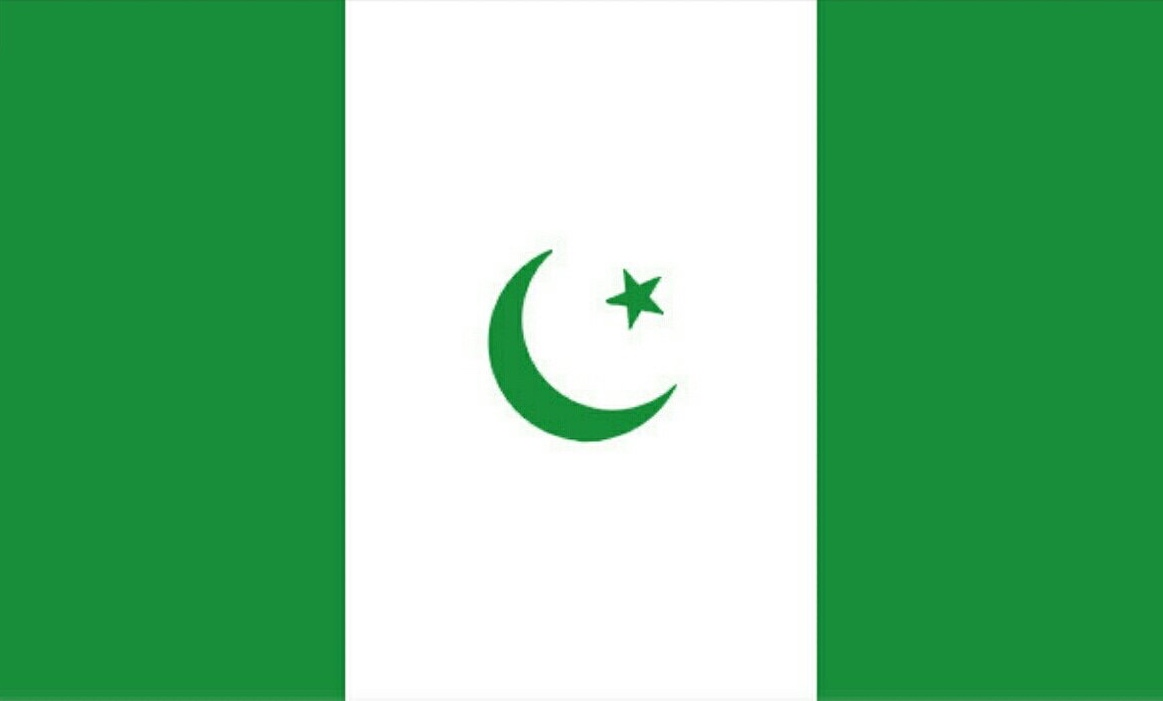

	First party	Second party	Third party
Leader	Jam Kamal Khan	Malik Sikandar Khan	Akhtar Mengal
Party	BAP	MMA	BNP (M)
Leader's seat	Lasbela-II	Quetta-II	Khuzdar-III
Last election	New Party	8 seats, 15.80%	2 seats, 6.19%
Seats won	24	10	10
Seat change	▲24	▲2	▲8
Popular vote	446,795	261,742	126,854
Percentage	24.44	15.28	9.04
Swing	new	▼0.52	▲2.85
	Fourth party
Leader	Yar Muhammad Rind
Party	PTI
Leader's seat	Kachhi-cum-Mastung
Last election	0 seats, 1.86%
Seats won	7
Seat change	▲7
Popular vote	109,757
Percentage	6.05
Swing	▲4.19
- Map of Balochistan Showing Assembly Constituencies and Winning parties
Chief Minister before election
Abdul Quddus Bizenjo
BAP
Elected Chief Minister
Jam Kamal Khan
BAP

Provincial elections were held in the Pakistani province of Balochistan on 25 July 2018. Newly formed Balochistan Awami Party (BAP) emerged as the largest party by winning 24 seats followed by Muttahida Majlis-e-Amal who won 10 seats. Pakistan Tehreek-e-Insaf won 7 seats for the very first time.

== Background ==
The 2013 elections resulted in a hung assembly, before Pakistan Muslim League (N), National Party, and Pashtunkhwa Milli Awami Party joined hands to form a coalition government. A power-sharing agreement was also brokered between PML-N and NP where the province's Chief Ministership tenure would be bifurcated between the two parties. In consequence, NP's Abdul Malik Baloch served as chief minister from 2013 to 2015 before he was replaced by PML-N's Sanaullah Khan Zehri at the end of 2015.

However, Zehri couldn't complete his term as on 2 January 2018, a number of dissident members from the ruling PML-N colluded with opposition lawmakers to submit a no-confidence motion against him. Seeing that he has lost the majority of the house's support in the ensuing turmoil, Zehri resigned from his post before a no-confidence vote could take place. Pakistan Muslim League (Q)'s, Abdul Quddus Bizenjo, an opposition lawmaker and one of the leaders of the no-confidence bloc, was elected as the province's 15th Chief Minister. He secured 41 of the 65 votes.

This in-house change was also important in the lead-up to the 2018 Senate elections as the bloc managed to secure 6 of the 12 seats for the province, with no seat for PML-N. Further down the line, the group was also successful in making an alliance with Pakistan Tehreek-e-Insaf and Pakistan Peoples Party for the election of the Senate chairman, leading to their combined candidate from Balochistan, Sadiq Sanjrani, being elected to the post.

On 29 March 2018, Anwaar-ul-Haq Kakar and Saeed Hashmi, with the support of Bizenjo, launched a new political party by the name of Balochistan Awami Party (BAP). It was composed of independent candidates, dissident PML-N lawmakers as well as PML-Q members

== Pre-election violence ==
On 13 July, a suicide bombing killed at least 131 people including BAP candidate for Balochistan Assembly, Nawabzada Siraj Raisani and over 200 injured.

== Results ==
24	11	10	7	4	3	2	1	1	1
BAP	MMA	BNP(M)	PTI	ANP	BNP(A)	HDP	PKMAP	JWP	PML-N

Vote Share of different parties in the election.
1. BAP (24.4%)
2. MMA (15.3%)
3. BNP(M) (9.04%)
4. PKMAP (6.50%)
5. PTI (6.05%)
6. NP (4.91%)
7. BNP(A) (3.79%)
8. PPP (3.09%)
9. ANP (2.73%)
10. JWP (1.56%)
11. PML(N) (1.54%)
12. HDP (0.70%)
13. TLP (0.59%)
14. OTH (2.83%)
15. IND (16.9%)
Seat Share of different parties in the election.
1. BAP (36.9%)
2. MMA (16.9%)
3. BNP(M) (15.4%)
4. PTI (10.8%)
5. ANP (6.15%)
6. BNP(A) (4.62%)
7. HDP (3.08%)
8. PKMAP (1.54%)
9. JWP (1.54%)
10. PML(N) (1.54%)

=== Party wise ===
Party	Votes		Seats							
Party	Votes		General				Women	Non-Muslims	Total	+/−
Party	No.	%	Contested	Won	Independents joined	Total	Women	Non-Muslims	Total	+/−
Balochistan Awami Party	444,257	24.44	49	15	4	19	4	1	24	New
Muttahida Majlis-e-Amal	277,659	15.28	47	8	0	8	2	1	11	New
Balochistan National Party (Mengal)	164,288	9.04	40	7	0	7	2	1	10	▲8
Pakistan Tehreek-e-Insaf	109,757	6.05	38	5	1	6	1	0	7	▲7
Pashtunkhwa Milli Awami Party	118,083	6.50	25	1	0	1	0	0	1	▼13
Balochistan National Party (Awami)	68,925	3.79	26	2	0	2	1	0	3	▲3
Jamhoori Wattan Party	28,313	1.56	12	1	0	1	0	0	1	▲1
Awami National Party	49,595	2.73	22	3	0	3	1	0	4	▲3
Pakistan Muslim League (N)	28,065	1.54	20	1	0	1	0	0	1	▼11
Hazara Democratic Party	12,803	0.70	2	2	0	2	0	0	2	▲2
Pakistan People's Party	56,095	3.09	39	0	0	0	0	0	0	Steady
National Party	89,168	4.91	26	0	0	0	0	0	0	▼10
Tehreek-e-Labbaik Pakistan	10,816	0.59	10	0	0	0	0	0	0	New
Other Parties	51,480	2.83	111	0	0					
Independents	308,083	16.95	476	5	-	0			0	
Valid Votes	1,817,387	95.67	943	50		50	11	3	64	
Rejected votes	82,178	4.33								
Total Votes Polled	1,899,565	100								
Registered voters/Turnout	4,194,243	45.29	Election was postponed in PP-35 Mastung							
Source: Election Commission of Pakistan (ECP)

=== Division-wise results ===
Division	Total seats	BAP	MMA	BNP(M)	PTI	ANP	BNP(A)	HDP	PKMAP	JWP	PML(N)	Election Postponed
Zhob	6	4	1	-	1	-	-	-	-	-	-	-
Sibi	4	2	-	-	1	-	-	-	-	1	-	-
Nasirabad	7	5	-	-	2	-	-	-	-	-	-	-
Quetta	15	-	5	3	1	3	-	2	1	-	-	-
Rakhshan	4	1	1	2	-	-	-	-	-	-	-	-
Kalat	9	4	1	1	1	-	-	-	-	-	1	1
Makran	6	3	-	1	-	-	2	-	-	-	-	-
Total	51	19	8	7	6	3	2	2	1	1	1	1

=== District-wise results ===
Division	District	Total seats	BAP	MMA	BNP(M)	PTI	ANP	BNP(A)	HDP	PKMAP	JWP	PML(N)	Election Postponed
Zhob	Musakhail	1	-	-	-	1	-	-	-	-	-	-	-
Zhob	Sherani	1	-	-	-	1	-	-	-	-	-	-	-
Zhob	Zhob	1	1	-	-	-	-	-	-	-	-	-	-
Zhob	Killa Saifullah	1	-	1	-	-	-	-	-	-	-	-	-
Zhob	Loralai	1	1	-	-	-	-	-	-	-	-	-	-
Zhob	Duki	1	1	-	-	-	-	-	-	-	-	-	-
Zhob	Barkhan	1	1	-	-	-	-	-	-	-	-	-	-
Sibi	Ziarat	1	1	-	-	-	-	-	-	-	-	-	-
Sibi	Harnai	1	1	-	-	-	-	-	-	-	-	-	-
Sibi	Sibi	1	1	-	-	-	-	-	-	-	-	-	-
Sibi	Lehri	1	1	-	-	-	-	-	-	-	-	-	-
Sibi	Kohlu	1	-	-	-	1	-	-	-	-	-	-	-
Sibi	Dera Bugti	1	-	-	-	-	-	-	-	-	1	-	-
Nasirabad	Nasirabad	2	2	-	-	-	-	-	-	-	-	-	-
Nasirabad	Jaffarabad	2	1	-	-	1	-	-	-	-	-	-	-
Nasirabad	Sohbatpur	1	1	-	-	-	-	-	-	-	-	-	-
Nasirabad	Jhal Magsi	1	1	-	-	-	-	-	-	-	-	-	-
Nasirabad	Kachhi	1	-	-	-	1	-	-	-	-	-	-	-
Quetta	Pishin	3	-	3	-	-	-	-	-	-	-	-	-
Quetta	Killa Abdullah	3	-	1	-	-	2	-	-	-	-	-	-
Quetta	Quetta	9	-	1	3	1	1	-	2	1	-	-	-
Rakhshan	Nushki	1	-	-	1	-	-	-	-	-	-	-	-
Rakhshan	Chagai	1	1	-	-	-	-	-	-	-	-	-	-
Rakhshan	Washuk	1	-	1	-	-	-	-	-	-	-	-	-
Rakhshan	Kharan	1	-	-	1	-	-	-	-	-	-	-	-
Kalat	Mastung	1	-	-	-	-	-	-	-	-	-	-	1
Kalat	Kalat	1	1	-	-	-	-	-	-	-	-	-	-
Kalat	Shaheed Sikandarabad	1	-	-	-	1	-	-	-	-	-	-	-
Kalat	Khuzdar	3	-	1	1	-	-	-	-	-	-	1	-
Kalat	Awaran	1	1	-	-	-	-	-	-	-	-	-	-
Kalat	Lasbela	2	2	-	-	-	-	-	-	-	-	-	-
Makran	Panjgur	1	-	-	-	-	-	1	-	-	-	-	-
Makran	Kech	4	3	-	-	-	-	1	-	-	-	-	-
Makran	Gwadar	1	-	-	1	-	-	-	-	-	-	-	-
Total		51	19	8	7	6	3	2	2	1	1	1	1

=== Constituency-wise results ===
District	Constituency		Winner				Runner Up				Margin	Turnout %
District	No.	Name	Candidate	Party	Votes	%	Candidate	Party	Votes	%	Margin	Turnout %
Musakhel-Sherani	PB-1	Musakhel-cum-Sherani	Sardar Babar Khan Musakhel	PTI	12,287	32.35	Haji Muhammad Hassan Sherani	MMA	12,214	32.16	73	38.04
Zhob	PB-2	Zhob	Mitta Khan Kakar	IND	16,368	32.66	Muhammad Nawaz	IND	9,578	19.11	6,790	44.50
Killa Saifullah	PB-3	Killa Saifullah	Maulana Noorullah	MMA	22,486	40.61	Nawab Muhammad Ayaz Khan Jogezai	PKMAP	17,250	31.16	5,236	54.95
Loralai	PB-4	Loralai	Muhammad Khan	BAP	14,039	30.07	Molvi Faizullah	MMA	12,148	26.02	1,891	54.16
Duki	PB-5	Dukki	Sardar Masood Ali Khan Luni	IND	13,638	48.06	Sardar Dur Muhammad Nasar	BAP	6,887	24.27	6,751	55.73
Ziarat-Harnai	PB-6	Ziarat-cum-Harnai	Noor Muhammad Dummar	BAP	20,629	32.49	Muheb Ullah	MMA	19,779	31.16	850	61.86
Sibi-Lehri	PB-7	Sibbi-cum-Lehri	Mir Sarfraz Chakar Domki	BAP	17,763	40.16	Muhammad Baro Khan Barozai	IND	6,202	14.02	11,561	36.49
Barkhan	PB-8	Barkhan	Sardar Abdul Rehman Khetran	IND	18,705	43.93	Abdul Kareem Khetran	NP	18,640	43.78	65	66.64
Kohlu	PB-9	Kohlu	Mir Naseebullah Khan	PTI	3,356	21.79	Changez Khan Marri	BAP	2,553	16.58	803	29.47
Dera Bugti	PB-10	Dera Bugti	Gohram Bugti	JWP	27,190	54.30	Sarfraz Bugti	BAP	17,112	34.17	10,078	43.88
Nasirabad	PB-11	Nasirabad-I	Mir Sikandar Ali	BAP	10,057	27.25	Mir Muhammad Sadiq Umrani	PPP	6,978	18.91	3,079	39.35
Nasirabad	PB-12	Nasirabad-II	Muhammad Khan Lehri	BAP	15,399	42.48	Baba Ghulam Rasool umrani	IND	11,239	31.01	4,160	39.97
Jafarabad	PB-13	Jafarabad-I	Umar Khan Jamali	PTI	19,198	44.63	Rahat Jamali	IND	17,940	41.71	1,258	41.59
Jafarabad	PB-14	Jafarabad-II	Jan Mohammad Jamali	BAP	19,099	63.48	Haider Ali Jamali	PPP	3,652	12.14	15,447	31.23
Sohbatpur	PB-15	Sohbatpur	Mir Saleem Ahmed Khoso	BAP	17,757	45.63	Mir Dauran khoso	NP	9,223	23.70	8,534	46.12
Jhal Magsi-Kachhi	PB-16	Jhal Magsi-cum-Kachhi	Nawabzada Tariq Magsi	BAP	15,040	67.14	Aurangzaib Alamgir Magsi	IND	6,405	28.57	8,635	41.46
Kachhi-Mastung	PB-17	Kachhi-cum-Mastung	Yar Muhammad Rind	PTI	16,633	47.56	Mir Muhammad Asim Kurd	BAP	15,098	43.17	1,535	37.16
Pishin	PB-18	Pishin-I	Abdul Wahid Siddique	MMA	22,924	46.47	Asfandyar Kakar	BAP	16,417	33.28	6,507	59.35
Pishin	PB-19	Pishin-II	Asghar Ali Tareen	MMA	14,582	43.95	Sardar Ghulam Mustafa Khan	PKMAP	10,980	33.09	3,602	42.52
Pishin	PB-20	Pishin-III	Sayed Muhammad Fazal Agha	MMA	18,076	49.79	Agha Syed Liaqat Ali	PKMAP	11,162	30.74	6,914	43.35
Killa Abdullah	PB-21	Killa Abdullah-I	Zmrak Khan	ANP	9,878	31.67	Habib Ullah Kakozai	MMA	6,913	22.17	2,965	45.97
Killa Abdullah	PB-22	Killa Abdullah-II	Muhammad Nawaz Khan Kakar	MMA	11,270	48.99	Muhammad Akbar	ANP	3,535	15.36	7,735	42.34
Killa Abdullah	PB-23	Killa Abdullah-III	Asghar Khan Achakzai	ANP	11,503	27.50	Molvi Muhammad Hanif	MMA	9,730	23.26	1,773	41.44
Quetta	PB-24	Quetta-I	Malik Naeem Khan Bazai	ANP	6,531	27.06	Saz uddin	MMA	5,103	21.14	1,428	47.50
Quetta	PB-25	Quetta-II	Malik Sikandar Khan	MMA	4,762	19.39	Nawab Salman Khan Khilji	IND	3,846	15.66	916	39.26
Quetta	PB-26	Quetta-III	Qadir Nayel	HDP	5,118	27.99	Wali Muhammad	MMA	3,243	17.74	1,875	32.96
Quetta	PB-27	Quetta-IV	Abdul Khaliq Hazara	HDP	7,685	17.70	Syed Bismillah	PTI	5,110	11.77	2,575	38.35
Quetta	PB-28	Quetta-V	Muhammad Mobeen Khan	PTI	7,371	23.08	Tahir Mehmood Khan	BAP	5,767	18.06	1,604	36.19
Quetta	PB-29	Quetta-VI	Mir Akhtar Hussain Langau	BNP(M)	12,603	30.47	Abdul Bari	PTI	6,658	16.10	5,945	37.84
Quetta	PB-30	Quetta-VII	Ahmed Nawaz Baloch	BNP(M)	10,109	42.77	Mir Atta Muhammad Bangulzai	NP	3,425	14.49	6,684	33.40
Quetta	PB-31	Quetta-VIII	Nasrullah Khan Bareach	PKMAP	4,278	26.07	Mir Lashkari Raisani	BNP(M)	3,855	23.49	423	32.84
Quetta	PB-32	Quetta-IX	Malik Naseer Ahmed Shahwani	BNP(M)	6,795	31.59	Abdul Ghafoor Haideri	MMA	4,436	20.62	2,359	36.74
Nushki	PB-33	Nushki	Babu Muhammad Rahim Mengal	BNP(M)	20,808	44.13	Mir Ghulam Dastagir Badini	BAP	10,370	21.99	10,438	57.30
Chagai	PB-34	Chagai	Muhammad Arif	IND	24,765	50.84	Amanullah	BAP	19,492	40.01	5,273	56.27
Mastung	PB-35	Mastung	Election postponed									
Shaheed Sikandarabad	PB-36	Shaheed Sikandarabad	Mir Naimatullah Zehri	IND	11,066	44.10	Mir Zafarullah Khan Zehri	BNP(A)	10,075	40.15	991	51.12
Kalat	PB-37	Kalat	Mir Ziaullah Zehri	BAP	13,335	30.02	Sardarzada Mir Saeed Ahmed	MMA	12,842	28.91	493	52.53
Khuzdar	PB-38	Khuzdar-I	Sanaullah Zehri	PML(N)	11,833	34.18	Abdul Khaliq	MMA	11,815	34.13	18	56.59
Khuzdar	PB-39	Khuzdar-II	Mir Younus Aziz Zehri	MMA	13,646	33.01	Sardar Muhammad Aslam Bizenjo	NP	10,222	24.72	3,424	52.25
Khuzdar	PB-40	Khuzdar-III	Mir Muhammad Akbar Mengal	BNP(M)	22,234	58.47	Mir Shamir Bizenjo	NP	8,802	23.15	13,432	55.78
Washuk	PB-41	Washuk	Mir Zabid Ali Reki	MMA	12,807	46.35	Mir Mujeeb ur Rehman	BAP	12,588	45.55	219	51.99
Kharan	PB-42	Kharan	Sanaullah Baloch	BNP(M)	15,526	47.33	Abdul Kareem Nosherwani	BAP	10,759	32.80	4,767	60.52
Panjgur	PB-43	Panjgur	Asadullah	BNP(A)	15,458	51.64	Zahid Hussain	BNP(M)	4,866	16.26	10,592	41.69
Awaran	PB-44	Awaran-cum-Panjgur	Abdul Quddus Bizenjo	BAP	8,055	24.65	Khair Jan	NP	5,963	18.25	2,092	34.28
Kech	PB-45	Kech-I	Zahoor Ahmed Buledi	BAP	15,671	70.66	Mir Muhammad Anwar	BNP(M)	1,911	8.62	13,760	40.48
Kech	PB-46	Kech-II	Syed Ehsan Shah	BNP(A)	15,056	53.71	Ghulam Rasool	NP	6,845	24.42	8,211	43.58
Kech	PB-47	Kech-III	Abdul Rauf Rind	BAP	11,942	52.80	Jamil Ahmed Dashti	BNP(M)	3,204	14.17	8,738	41.14
Kech	PB-48	Kech-IV	Akbar Askani	BAP	7,034	48.47	Muhammad Asghar	BNP(A)	3,451	23.78	3,583	35.17
Lasbela	PB-49	Lasbela-I	Sardar Muhammad Saleh Bhotani	BAP	30,012	57.81	Muhammad Sharif	PPP	8,632	8,632	21,380	56.35
Lasbela	PB-50	Lasbela-II	Jam Kamal Khan	BAP	38,885	50.33	Nasrullah	IND	26,050	33.72	12,835	58.78
Gwadar	PB-51	Gwadar	Mir Hamal Kalmati	BNP(M)	31,248	50.81	Yaqoob Bizanjo	BAP	16,585	26.79	14,663	53.43

=== Members elected on Reserved seats ===
Reserved Seats	Party	Member
For Women	Balochistan Awami Party	Rubaba Khan Buledi
For Women	Balochistan Awami Party	Laila Tareen
For Women	Balochistan Awami Party	Mah Jabeen Sharan
For Women	Balochistan Awami Party	Bushra Rind
For Women	Muttahida Majlis-e-Amal	Bano Khalil Ahmed
For Women	Muttahida Majlis-e-Amal	Zubeda Dakhtarullah
For Women	Balochistan National Party (Mengal)	Zeenat Shahwani
For Women	Balochistan National Party (Mengal)	Shakeela Naveed
For Women	Pakistan Tehreek-e-Insaf	Fareeda Bibi
For Women	Awami National Party	Shahina Kakar
For Women	Balochistan National Party (Awami)	Mastoora Bibi
For Non-Muslims	Balochistan Awami Party	Danesh Kumar
For Non-Muslims	Muttahida Majlis-e-Amal	Sham Lal
For Non-Muslims	Balochistan National Party (Mengal)	Titus Johnson

== See also ==
- 2018 Pakistani general election
- Punjab Provincial Election, 2018
- Sindh Provincial Election, 2018
- Khyber Pakhtunkhwa Provincial Election, 2018
