= 2024 Balochistan provincial election =

- 8 February 2024

51 out of 65 seats in the Balochistan Assembly (Note: 11 seats are reserved for Women and 3 are reserved for Non-Muslims filled through Proportional representation) 33 seats needed for a majority
- Registered: 5,371,947
- Turnout: 42.9% (▼2.37%)

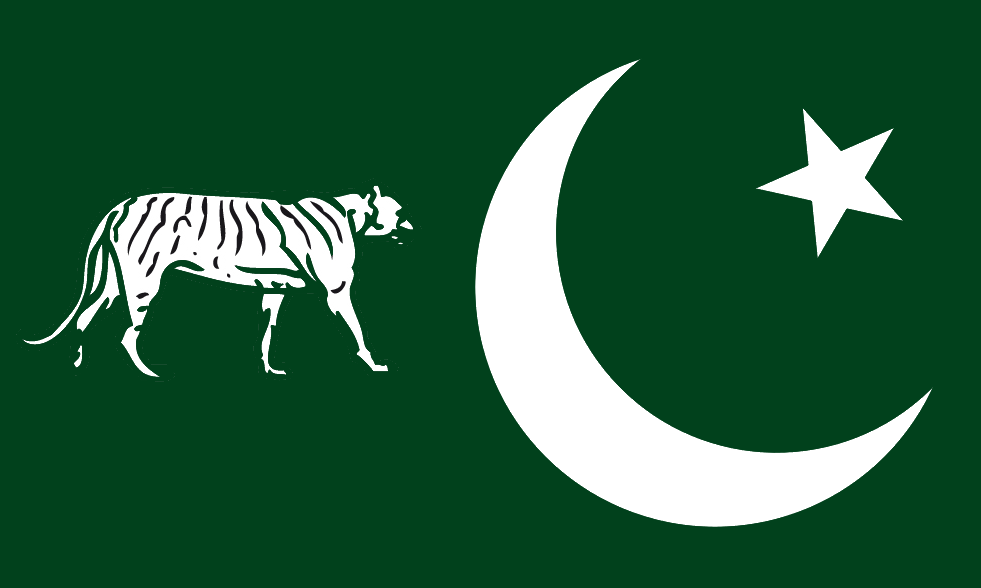

| | First party | Second party | Third party |
|---|---|---|---|
| Leader | Sarfraz Bugti | Jaffar Khan Mandokhail | Abdul Wasey |
| Party | PPP | PML(N) | JUI (F) |
| Leader since | 18 December 2023 | 3 February 2023 | - |
| Leader's seat | Dera Bugti | Zhob (lost) | Killa Saifullah (lost) |
| Last election | 3.09%, 0 seats | 1.54%, 1 seat | Did not contest (Note: JUI (F) did not contest the 2018 elections, as they were part of an electoral alliance called Muttahida Majlis-e-Amal) |
| Seats won | 19 | 18 | 14 |
| Seat change | ▲19 | ▲17 | ▲14 |
| Popular vote | 367,837 | 278,924 | 392,626 |
| Percentage | 15.98% | 12.12% | 17.06% |
| Swing | ▲12.89pp | ▲10.58pp | n/a |
- Map of Balochistan with Provincial Assembly constituencies
Chief Minister before election
Abdul Quddus Bizenjo
BAP
Elected Chief Minister
Sarfraz Bugti
PPP

Provincial elections were held in Balochistan on 8 February 2024 to elect a new provincial legislature. On 5 August 2023, after the approval of the results of the 2023 digital census by the Council of Common Interests headed by Prime Minister Shehbaz Sharif, elections have been delayed for several months, as new delimitations will be published on 14 December 2023. On 2 November 2023, the Election Commission of Pakistan announced, in agreement with the President of Pakistan, Arif Alvi, that the elections will be held on 8 February 2024. This election will be held concurrently with nationwide general elections and other provincial elections.

== Background ==
In the 2018 election, the newly formed Balochistan Awami Party (BAP), created by former members of Pakistan Muslim League (Q) (PML-Q) and Pakistan Muslim League (N) (PML-N), emerged as the largest party in the province by winning 24 seats.

The Muttahida Majlis-e-Amal (MMA) and the Balochistan National Party (Mengal) (BNP-M) became the second and third largest parties by securing 10 seats each.

The Pakistan Tehreek-e-Insaf (PTI) won 7 seats and emerged as the fourth largest party in the province for the very first time.

The PML(N), the Pashtunkhwa Milli Awami Party (PMAP) and the National Party faced their worst ever defeats, as they won one, one, and zero seats, respectively.

Since no party got the majority, the BAP, PTI, Awami National Party (ANP) and Hazara Democratic Party (HDP) formed a coalition government.

On 26 September 2021, a political crisis occurred in the province after a motion of a no-confidence motion was tabled against Chief Minister Jam Kamal Khan Alyani. Alyani resigned on 24 October 2021.

Abdul Quddus Bizenjo became the new Chief Minister on 29 October 2021.

On 12 August 2023, the Assembly was dissolved by Governor Abdul Wali Kakar on Bizenjo's advice.

=== Ban on PTI from contesting as a party ===
On 22 December 2023, the Election Commission of Pakistan (ECP) decided against letting the PTI retain its electoral symbol, arguing that the party had failed to hold intra-party elections. On 22 December, the PTI approached the Peshawar High Court (PHC) against the ECP's order and hence, a single-member bench suspended the ECP's order until 9 January 2024. On 30 December 2023, the ECP filed a review application within the PHC, and days later, a two-member bench withdrew the suspension order as it heard the case. However, on 10 January 2024, the two-member bench had declared the ECP's order to be "illegal, without any lawful authority, and of no legal effect. On 11 January, the ECP challenged this ruling in the Supreme Court, and on 13 January, a three-member bench ruled in favor of the ECP and stripped the PTI of its electoral symbol. As a consequence of this ruling, the PTI could not allot party tickets to any of its candidates. Therefore, all candidates of the party will be listed as independent candidates and each will have a different electoral symbol.

== Schedule ==
The schedule of the election was announced by the Election Commission of Pakistan on 15 December 2023.

| Sr no | Poll Event | Schedule |
|---|---|---|
| 1 | Public Notice Issued by the Returning Officers | 19 December 2023 |
| 2 | Dates of filing Nomination papers with the Returning Officers by the candidates | 20 December 2023 to 24 December 2023 |
| 3 | Publication of names of the nominated candidates. | 24 December 2023 |
| 4 | Last date of scrutiny of nomination papers by the Returning Officer | 25 December 2023 to 30 December 2023 |
| 5 | Last date of filing appeals against decisions of the Returning Officer rejecting/accepting nomination papers. | 3 January 2024 |
| 6 | Last date for deciding of appeals by the Appellate Tribunal | 10 January 2024 |
| 7 | Publication of revised list of candidates | 11 January 2024 |
| 8 | Last date of withdrawal of candidate and publication of revised list of candidates | 12 January 2024 |
| 9 | Allotment of election symbol to contesting candidates | 13 January 2024 |
| 10 | Date of Polling and Counting of Votes | 8 February 2024 |

== Electoral system ==
The 65 seats of the Balochistan Assembly consist of 51 general seats, whose members are elected by the first-past-the-post voting system through single-member constituencies. 11 seats are reserved for women and 3 seats are reserved for non-Muslims. The members on these seats are elected through proportional representation based on the total number of general seats secured by each political party.

== Opinion polls ==
| Polling firm | Last date of polling | Link | JUI-F | PTI | ANP | PPP | PMLN | BAP | BNP-M | PKMAP | Other | TLP | Lead | Sample size | Undecideds & Non-voters (Note: This is a column that lists the percentage of undecided voters and non-voters in certain polls that publish this data. As some polls do not publish any data whatsoever on undecided voters and non-voters, the columns with survey participants that had a preference when polled are all that is needed to reach 100%. In surveys that do include data on non-voters and undecided voters, a scaling factor is applied to the margin of error and the rest of the data (for example, if the number of undecideds and non-voters equals 20%, each party would have their vote share scaled up by a factor of 100/80 (the formula is 100/(100-UndecidedPercentage)). This is done to keep consistency between the different polls and the different types data they provide.) |
|---|---|---|---|---|---|---|---|---|---|---|---|---|---|---|---|
| PA | 13 August 2023 | The Provincial Assembly is dissolved by Governor Malik Abdul Wali Kakar on the advice of Chief Minister Mir Abdul Qudoos Bizenjo. | | | | | | | | | | | | | |
| Gallup Pakistan | 30 June 2023 | PDF | 7% | 36% | 11% | 18% | 11% | 17% | | | | | 18% | 3,500 | N/A (Note: This poll or crosstabulation did not include any data about undecided voters or non-voters and cut them out completely from the published results.) |
| NA | 11–12 April 2022 | Imran Khan is removed from office in a no-confidence motion | | | | | | | | | | | | | |
| IPOR (IRI) | 21 March 2022 | PDF | 14% | 18% | 1% | 17% | 15% | 11% | 4% | 6% | 14% | | 1% | ~810 | N/A |
| Gallup Pakistan | 31 January 2022 | PDF | 11% | 19% | 8% | 22% | 10% | 5% | 2% | | | 1% | 3% | ~1,300 | 22% |
| IPOR (IRI) | 9 January 2022 | PDF | 8% | 18% | 2% | 15% | 14% | 20% | 5% | 5% | 13% | | 2% | 867 | N/A |
| 2018 Elections | 25 July 2018 | ECP | 15.3% | 6.1% | 2.7% | 3.1% | 1.5% | 24.4% | 9.0% | 6.5% | 14.4% | 17.0% | 9.1% | 1,899,565 | N/A |
| Directly elected seats | | | 8 | 5 | 3 | 0 | 1 | 15 | 7 | 1 | BNPA 2 HDP 2 JWP 1 | 5 | 7 | _{Women: 11 / non-Muslims: 3 Total = 64 seats} | |

== Results ==
| Party | Popular vote | | | Seats | | | | | | | |
| Party | Popular vote | | | General | | | | Reserved | | Total | +/− |
| Party | Votes | % | ±pp | Contested | Won | Independents Joined | Total | Women | Non-Muslims | Total | +/− |
|---|---|---|---|---|---|---|---|---|---|---|---|
| PPP | 381,549 | 16.73 | +13.64 | 48 | 11 | 4 | 15 | 3 | 1 | 19 | ▲19 |
| PMLN | 297,063 | 13.03 | +11.49 | 40 | 12 | 2 | 14 | 3 | 1 | 18 | ▲17 |
| JUI (F) | 399,825 | 17.53 | N/A | 46 | 9 | 0 | 9 | 2 | 1 | 12 | ▲1 |
| BAP | 127,340 | 5.58 | -18.86 | 29 | 4 | 0 | 4 | 1 | 0 | 5 | ▼19 |
| NP | 135,589 | 5.95 | +1.04 | 30 | 3 | 0 | 3 | 1 | 0 | 4 | ▲4 |
| ANP | 92,609 | 4.06 | +1.33 | 20 | 2 | 0 | 2 | 1 | 0 | 3 | ▼1 |
| BNP(M) | 109,641 | 4.81 | -4.23 | 38 | 1 | 0 | 1 | 0 | 0 | 1 | ▼9 |
| BNP(A) | 19,108 | 0.84 | 2.95 | 19 | 1 | 0 | 1 | 0 | 0 | 1 | ▼2 |
| JIP | 24,587 | 1.08 | N/A | 38 | 1 | 0 | 1 | 0 | 0 | 1 | ▲1 |
| HDTB | 20,996 | 0.92 | N/A | 7 | 1 | 0 | 1 | 0 | 0 | 1 | New entry |
| PTI | 72,030 | 3.16 | -2.89 | 28 | 0 | 0 | 0 | 0 | 0 | 0 | ▼7 |
| PkMAP | 132,721 | 5.82 | -0.68 | 24 | 0 | 0 | 0 | 0 | 0 | 0 | ▼1 |
| HDP | 14,070 | 0.62 | -0.08 | 2 | 0 | 0 | 0 | 0 | 0 | 0 | ▼2 |
| JWP | 26,300 | 1.15 | -0.41 | 4 | 0 | 0 | 0 | 0 | 0 | 0 | ▼1 |
| TLP | 19,403 | 0.85 | +0.26 | 21 | 0 | 0 | 0 | 0 | 0 | 0 | Steady |
| IPP | 407,698 | 17.88 | | | 0 | 0 | 0 | 0 | 0 | 0 | Steady |
| PKNAP | 407,698 | 17.88 | 0 | 0 | 0 | 0 | 0 | 0 | 0 | 0 | |
| Total | 2,280,529 | 100% | | | 51 | | | 11 | 3 | 65 | |
| Valid votes | 2,280,529 | | | | | | | | | | |
| Invalid votes | | | | | | | | | | | |
| Votes cast/ turnout | | 42.87% | | | | | | | | | |
| Abstentions | | | | | | | | | | | |
| Registered voters | 5,371,947 | | | | | | | | | | |
Source: Election Commission of Pakistan

=== Division-wise results ===
| Division | Total seats | PPP | PML(N) | JUI(F) | BAP | NP | ANP | BNP(M) | BNP(A) | JI | HDT |
|---|---|---|---|---|---|---|---|---|---|---|---|
| Zhob | 6 | 1 | 3 | 2 | - | - | - | - | - | - | - |
| Sibi | 4 | 3 | 1 | - | - | - | - | - | - | - | - |
| Nasirabad | 7 | 2 | 3 | - | 1 | - | - | - | - | 1 | - |
| Rakhshan | 4 | - | 1 | 2 | 1 | - | - | - | - | - | - |
| Kalat | 9 | 2 | 1 | 3 | 1 | 1 | - | 1 | - | - | - |
| Makran | 7 | 2 | 1 | - | - | 2 | - | - | 1 | - | 1 |
| Quetta | 14 | 6 | 3 | 2 | 1 | - | 2 | - | - | - | - |
| Total | 51 | 16 | 13 | 9 | 4 | 3 | 2 | 1 | 1 | 1 | 1 |

=== District-wise results ===
| Division | District | Total seats | PPP | PML(N) | JUI(F) | BAP | NP | ANP | BNP(M) | BNP(A) | JI | HDT |
|---|---|---|---|---|---|---|---|---|---|---|---|---|
| Zhob | Sherani | 1 | - | - | 1 | - | - | - | - | - | - | - |
| Zhob | Zhob | 1 | - | - | 1 | - | - | - | - | - | - | - |
| Zhob | Killa Saifullah | 1 | 1 | - | - | - | - | - | - | - | - | - |
| Zhob | Musakhail | 1 | - | 1 | - | - | - | - | - | - | - | - |
| Zhob | Barkhan | 1 | - | 1 | - | - | - | - | - | - | - | - |
| Zhob | Loralai | 1 | - | 1 | - | - | - | - | - | - | - | - |
| Zhob | Duki | 1 | - | 1 | - | - | - | - | - | - | - | - |
| Sibi | Ziarat | 1 | - | 1 | - | - | - | - | - | - | - | - |
| Sibi | Harnai | 1 | - | 1 | - | - | - | - | - | - | - | - |
| Sibi | Sibi | 1 | 1 | - | - | - | - | - | - | - | - | - |
| Sibi | Kohlu | 1 | 1 | - | - | - | - | - | - | - | - | - |
| Sibi | Dera Bugti | 1 | 1 | - | - | - | - | - | - | - | - | - |
| Nasirabad | Jhal Magsi | 1 | - | - | - | 1 | - | - | - | - | - | - |
| Nasirabad | Kachhi | 1 | - | 1 | - | - | - | - | - | - | - | - |
| Nasirabad | Nasirabad | 2 | 1 | 1 | - | - | - | - | - | - | - | - |
| Nasirabad | Sohbatpur | 1 | - | 1 | - | - | - | - | - | - | - | - |
| Nasirabad | Jaffarabad | 1 | - | - | - | - | - | - | - | - | 1 | - |
| Nasirabad | Usta Muhammad | 1 | 1 | - | - | - | - | - | - | - | - | - |
| Kalat | Khuzdar | 3 | 1 | - | 1 | - | - | - | 1 | - | | - |
| Kalat | Hub | 1 | 1 | - | | - | - | - | - | - | - | - |
| Kalat | Lasbela | 1 | - | 1 | - | - | - | - | - | - | - | - |
| Kalat | Awaran | 1 | - | - | - | - | 1 | - | - | - | - | - |
| Makran | Gwadar | 1 | - | - | - | - | - | - | - | - | - | 1 |
| Makran | Kech | 4 | 2 | 1 | - | - | 1 | - | - | - | - | - |
| Makran | Panjgur | 2 | - | - | - | - | 1 | - | - | 1 | - | - |
| Rakhshan | Washuk | 1 | - | - | 1 | - | - | - | - | - | - | - |
| Rakhshan | Chagai | 1 | - | - | - | 1 | - | - | - | - | - | - |
| Rakhshan | Kharan | 1 | - | 1 | - | - | - | - | - | - | - | - |
| Rakhshan | Nushki | 1 | - | - | 1 | - | - | - | - | - | - | - |
| Kalat | Surab | 1 | - | - | 1 | - | - | - | - | - | - | - |
| Kalat | Kalat | 1 | - | - | - | 1 | - | - | - | - | - | - |
| Kalat | Mastung | 1 | - | - | 1 | - | - | - | - | - | - | - |
| Quetta | Quetta | 9 | 5 | 2 | - | 1 | - | 1 | - | - | - | - |
| Quetta | Pishin | 3 | 1 | - | 2 | - | - | - | - | - | - | - |
| Quetta | Killa Abdullah | 1 | - | - | - | - | - | 1 | - | - | - | - |
| Quetta | Chaman | 1 | - | 1 | - | - | - | - | - | - | - | - |
| Total | | 51 | 16 | 13 | 9 | 4 | 3 | 2 | 1 | 1 | 1 | 1 |

=== Constituency-wise results ===
| District | Constituency | | Winner | | | | Runner Up | | | | Margin | Turnout % |
| District | No. | Name | Candidate | Party | Votes | % | Candidate | Party | Votes | % | Margin | Turnout % |
|---|---|---|---|---|---|---|---|---|---|---|---|---|
| Sherani | PB-1 | Sherani-Cum-Zhob | Nawaz Kibzai | JUI(F) | 14,183 | 37.71 | Shan Zaman | IND | 8,562 | 22.77 | 5,621 | 38.83 |
| Zhob | PB-2 | Zhob | Fazal Qadir Mandokhail | JUI(F) | 11,453 | 34.21 | Mitha Khan Kakar | IND | 9,115 | 27.22 | 2,338 | 37.55 |
| Killa Saifullah | PB-3 | Killa Saifullah | Maulana Noorullah | IND | 24,408 | 37.51 | Abdul Wasey | JUI(F) | 20,661 | 31.76 | 3,747 | 54.24 |
| Musakhel-Barkhan | PB-4 | Musakhel-cum-Barkhan | Abdul Rehman Khetran | PML(N) | 24,172 | 31.40 | Abdul Karim | NP | 19,012 | 24.70 | 5,160 | 51.59 |
| Loralai | PB-5 | Loralai | Muhammad Khan Toor Utmankhel | PML(N) | 14,424 | 26.99 | Molvi Faiz Ullah | JUI(F) | 12,456 | 22.31 | 1,968 | 46.47 |
| Duki | PB-6 | Duki | Sardar Masood Ali Khan Luni | PML(N) | 10,377 | 21.54 | Sardar Muhammad Anwar Khan Nasir | IND | 9,804 | 20.35 | 573 | 76.52 |
| Ziarat-Harnai | PB-7 | Ziarat cum Harnai | Noor Muhammad Dummar | PML(N) | 29,857 | 39.24 | Khalil Dummar | JUI(F) | 25,973 | 34.14 | 3,884 | 62.15 |
| Sibi | PB-8 | Sibi | Mir Sarfraz Chakar Domki | PPP | 27,677 | 51.22 | Mir Muhammad Asghar Khan Marri | IND | 23,769 | 43.99 | 3,908 | 47.39 |
| Kohlu | PB-9 | Kohlu | Mir Naseebullah Khan | PTI | 25,895 | 39,568 | Changez Khan Marri | PML(N) | 4,156 | 21.57 | 0,157 | 30.35 |
| Dera Bugti | PB-10 | Dera Bugti | Sarfraz Bugti | PPP | 52,485 | 64.96 | Gohram Bugti | JWP | 25,773 | 31.90 | 26,712 | 60.54 |
| Jhal Magsi | PB-11 | Jhal Magsi | Nawabzada Tariq Magsi | BAP | 44,556 | 90.32 | Mir Murtaza Abbas | BNP(M) | 1,244 | 2.53 | 43,312 | 67.96 |
| Kachhi | PB-12 | Kachhi | Mir Mohammad Asim Kurd Gello | PML(N) | 22,557 | 42.82 | Yar Muhammad Rind | PPP | 17,869 | 33.92 | 4,688 | 38.32 |
| Nasirabad | PB-13 | Nasirabad-I | Mir Muhammad Sadiq Umrani | PPP | 14,856 | 33.46 | Mir Sikandar Ali | BAP | 9,505 | 21.41 | 5,351 | 36.07 |
| Nasirabad | PB-14 | Nasirabad-II | Muhammad Khan Lehri | PML(N) | 22,639 | 51.79 | Ghulam Rasool | PPP | 18,948 | 43.35 | 3,691 | 45.09 |
| Sohbatpur | PB-15 | Sohbatpur | Mir Saleem Ahmed Khoso | PML(N) | 24,619 | 53.36 | Muhammad Doran | PPP | 15,997 | 34.67 | 8,622 | 42.35 |
| Jafarabad | PB-16 | Jafarabad | Abdul Majeed Badini | JI | 15,248 | 33.24 | Rahat Jamali | PML(N) | 14,131 | 30.81 | 1,117 | 36.28 |
| Usta Muhammad | PB-17 | Usta Muhammad | Faisal Khan Jamali | PPP | 28,333 | 58.76 | Jan Mohammad Jamali | BAP | 13,977 | 28.99 | 14,356 | 36.25 |
| Khuzdar | PB-18 | Khuzdar-I | Sanaullah Khan Zehri | PPP | 20,014 | 52.38 | Ghulam Sarwar | JUI(F) | 13,791 | 36.09 | 6,223 | 50.02 |
| Khuzdar | PB-19 | Khuzdar-II | Mir Younus Aziz Zehri | JUI(F) | 19,137 | 35.70 | Shakeel Ahmed Durrani | PPP | 15,206 | 28.37 | 3,931 | 44.23 |
| Khuzdar | PB-20 | Khuzdar-III | Akhtar Mengal | BNP(M) | 28,097 | 62.25 | Mir Shafique Ur Rehman Mengal | IND | 9,243 | 20.48 | 18,854 | 51.21 |
| Hub | PB-21 | Hub | Ali Hassan Zehri | PPP | 23,974 | 34.09 | Rajab Ali Rind | NP | 17,441 | 24.80 | 6,533 | 62.67 |
| Lasbela | PB-22 | Lasbela | Jam Kamal Khan | PML(N) | 38,562 | 49.46 | Muhammad Hassan | PPP | 18,373 | 23.57 | 20,189 | 60.08 |
| Awaran | PB-23 | Awaran | Khair Jan | NP | 15,635 | 57.07 | Abdul Quddus Bizenjo | PPP | 9,233 | 33.70 | 6,402 | 31.80 |
| Gwadar | PB-24 | Gwadar | Hidayat ur Rehman Baloch | HDT | 20,925 | 41.63 | Mir Hamal Kalmati | BNP(M) | 16,522 | 32.87 | 4,403 | 37.97 |
| Kech | PB-25 | Kech-I | Zahoor Ahmed Buledi | PPP | 9,099 | 61.49 | Jan Muhammad | NP | 4,895 | 33.08 | 4,204 | 22.11 |
| Kech | PB-26 | Kech-II | Abdul Malik Baloch | NP | 14,004 | 56.07 | Syed Ehsan Shah | BNP(M) | 9,608 | 38.47 | 4,396 | 31.62 |
| Kech | PB-27 | Kech-III | Barkat Ali Rind | PML(N) | 15,552 | 59.67 | Jamil Ahmed Dashti | IND | 4,622 | 17.73 | 10,930 | 45.36 |
| Kech | PB-28 | Kech-IV | Mir Asghar Rind | PPP | 7,090 | 50.15 | Mir Hamal Khan | NP | 4,366 | 19.27 | 2,724 | 24.38 |
| Panjgur | PB-29 | Panjgur-I | Mir Asadullah Baloch | BNP(A) | 7,263 | 46.88 | Muhammad Islam | NP | 4,547 | 29.35 | 2,716 | 28.73 |
| Panjgur | PB-30 | Panjgur-II | Rahmat Saleh Baloch | NP | 9,690 | 49.43 | Shakeel Ahmed | BNP(A) | 8,349 | 42.59 | 1,341 | 30.32 |
| Washuk | PB-31 | Washuk | Mir Zabid Ali Reki | JUI(F) | 17,058 | 50.02 | Mir Mujeeb-ur-Rehman Muhammad Hasani | PML(N) | 16,008 | 46.94 | 1,050 | 53.65 |
| Chagai | PB-32 | Chagai | Sadiq Sanjrani | BAP | 19,901 | 39.38 | Aman Ullah | JUI(F) | 17,178 | 33.99 | 2,723 | 43.69 |
| Kharan | PB-33 | Kharan | Mir Shoaib Nosherwani | PML(N) | 11,207 | 32.43 | Sanaullah Baloch | BNP(M) | 9,050 | 26.19 | 2,157 | 52.46 |
| Nushki | PB-34 | Nushki | Haji Ghulam Dastagir Badeni | JUI(F) | 16,771 | 38.44 | Muhammad Raheem | BNP(M) | 15,014 | 34.41 | 1,757 | 41.79 |
| Surab | PB-35 | Surab | Mir Zafarullah Khan Zehri | JUI(F) | 16,579 | 55.69 | Mir Naimatullah Zehri | PPP | 11,113 | 37.33 | 5,466 | 50.79 |
| Kalat | PB-36 | Kalat | Mir Ziaullah Langau | BAP | 14,848 | 35.08 | Mir Saeed Ahmed Langove | JUI(F) | 11,025 | 26.05 | 3,823 | 41.92 |
| Mastung | PB-37 | Mastung | Aslam Raisani | JUI(F) | 13,668 | 32.47 | Sardar Noor Muhammad Bangalzai | PPP | 11,426 | 27.15 | 2,242 | 32.97 |
| Quetta | PB-38 | Quetta-I | Malik Naeem Khan Bazai | ANP | 7,792 | 31.15 | Ainullah Shams | JUI(F) | 6,280 | 25.10 | 1,512 | 32.27 |
| Quetta | PB-39 | Quetta-II | Bakht Muhammad Kakar | IND | 6,618 | 20.36 | Syed Abdul Wahid | JUI(F) | 5,878 | 18.08 | 740 | 34.47 |
| Quetta | PB-40 | Quetta-III | Samad Khan Gorgage | PPP | 9,225 | 31.48 | Qadir Ali | HDP | 5,588 | 19.07 | 3,637 | 39.05 |
| Quetta | PB-41 | Quetta-IV | Wali Muhammad Noorzai | IND | 9,318 | 24.98 | Abdul Gaffar Kakar | PTI | 7,270 | 19.49 | 2,048 | 30.79 |
| Quetta | PB-42 | Quetta-V | Sheikh Zarak Khan Mandokhail | PML(N) | 10,423 | 24.02 | Abdul Khaliq Hazara | HDP | 8,520 | 19.64 | 1,903 | 31.03 |
| Quetta | PB-43 | Quetta-VI | Mir Liaquat Ali Lehri | IND | 7,277 | 17.22 | Sardar Doda Khan | PTI | 5,190 | 12.28 | 2,087 | 30.42 |
| Quetta | PB-44 | Quetta-VII | Mir Ubaidullah Gorgage | PPP | 7,125 | 25.83 | Mir Attaullah Bangalzai | NP | 6,385 | 23.15 | 740 | 31.97 |
| Quetta | PB-45 | Quetta-VIII | Ali Madad Jattak | PPP | 5,671 | 33.56 | Mir Muhammad Usman Parkani | JUI(F) | 4,346 | 25.72 | 1,325 | 33.63 |
| Quetta | PB-46 | Quetta-IX | Prince Ahmed Umer Ahmedzai | BAP | 4,638 | 27.28 | Sardar Ahmed Khan Shahwani | JUI(F) | 1,752 | 10.30 | 2,886 | 23.04 |
| Pishin | PB-47 | Pishin-I | Asfand Yar Khan Kakar | IND | 21,714 | 42.51 | Kamal Ud Din | JUI(F) | 18,989 | 37.17 | 2,725 | 51.64 |
| Pishin | PB-48 | Pishin-II | Asghar Ali Tareen | JUI(F) | 17,944 | 42.86 | Sardar Amjad Khan | PKMAP | 15,013 | 35.86 | 2,931 | 43.04 |
| Pishin | PB-49 | Pishin-II | Syed Zafar Ali Agha | JUI(F) | 13,811 | 33.49 | Agha Syed Liaqat Ali | PKMAP | 12,778 | 30.99 | 1,033 | 39.00 |
| Killa Abdullah | PB-50 | Killa Abdullah | Zmarak Khan Achakzai | ANP | 44,712 | 33.47 | Muhammad Nawaz | JUI(F) | 43,445 | 32.52 | 1,267 | 81.99 |
| Chaman | PB-51 | Chaman | Abdul Khaliq Khan Achakzai | IND | 20,390 | 26.00 | Asghar Khan Achakzai | ANP | 19,623 | 25.03 | 767 | 40.41 |

=== Members elected on Reserved seats ===
| Reserved Seats | Party | Member |
|---|---|---|
| For Women | PPP | Ghazala Gola |
| For Women | PPP | Meena |
| For Women | PPP | Shahnaz Umrani |
| For Women | PML(N) | Rahila Durrani |
| For Women | PML(N) | Hadia Nawaz |
| For Women | PML(N) | Rubaba Khan |
| For Women | JUI (F) | Shahida Rauf |
| For Women | JUI (F) | Safia |
| For Women | BAP | Farah Azeem Shah |
| For Women | NP | Ume Kalsoom |
| For Women | ANP | Salma Bibi |
| For Non-Muslims | PPP | Sanjay Kumar |
| For Non-Muslims | PML(N) | Patrick Sant Masih |
| For Non-Muslims | JUI (F) | Ravi Pahuja |

== Aftermath ==
After Elections 4 Independents elected from PB-3, PB-39, PB-43 and PB-47 joined Pakistan People's Party and 2 from PB-41 and PB-51 joined Pakistan Muslim League (N).

PPP and PML(N) both got 3 reserved seats for women each, JUI(F) got 2 and ANP and NP got 1 seats each. PML(N), PPP and JUI(F) each got 1 seat for Non-Muslims.

=== Elections for Speaker and Deputy Speaker ===
Abdul Khaliq Khan Achakzai of PML(N) and Ghazala Gola of PPP elected unopposed as Speaker and Deputy Speaker of Balochistan Assembly respectively.

=== Elections for Chief Minister ===
Sarfraz Bugti of PPP elected as Chief Minister of Balochistan unopposed.

== See also ==
- 2024 Pakistani general election
- 2024 Khyber Pakhtunkhwa provincial election
- 2024 Sindh provincial election
- 2024 Punjab provincial election
