= 2015 Balochistan local government elections =

Local elections in Pakistan

2015 Balochistan Local Government Elections
- 29 May 2015
Candidate	Muttahida Qaumi Movement-Pakistan (MQM-P)	Balochistan Awami Party (BAP)	Pakistan Tehreek-e-Insaf (PTI)
Candidate	Balochistan National Party-Mengal (BNP-M)	Independents

The 2015 Balochistan local government elections were held in the Pakistani province of Balochistan on 29 May 2015. The elections were held for the first time in the province after the passage of the Balochistan Local Government Act 2013. The elections were contested by a total of 1,260 candidates, including 620 men and 640 women. The Muttahida Qaumi Movement-Pakistan (MQM-P) emerged as the largest party in the elections, winning 280 seats. The Balochistan Awami Party (BAP) won 250 seats, the Pakistan Tehreek-e-Insaf (PTI) won 170 seats, and the Balochistan National Party-Mengal (BNP-M) won 100 seats. The remaining 100 seats were won by independent candidates.

== Background ==
The Balochistan Local Government Act 2013 was passed by the Balochistan Assembly on 22 December 2013. The act provided for the establishment of a three-tier local government system in Balochistan. The three tiers of the local government system were:

- District councils
- Tehsil councils
- Union councils

The act also provided for the election of representatives to the local government councils. The elections to the local government councils were held on 29 May 2015.

== Results ==
The results of the elections were as follows:

- Muttahida Qaumi Movement-Pakistan (MQM-P): 280 seats
- Balochistan Awami Party (BAP): 250 seats
- Pakistan Tehreek-e-Insaf (PTI): 170 seats
- Balochistan National Party-Mengal (BNP-M): 100 seats
- Independents: 100 seats
