= Balochistan National Party =

Balochistan National Party may refer to:

- Balochistan National Party (Awami)
- Balochistan National Party (Mengal)
