= PB-46 Pishin-cum-Karezat =

Former constituency of the Provincial Assembly of Balochistan, Pakistan

- Former constituency for the Provincial Assembly of Balochistan
- Region: Karezat District and Nana Sahib and Bostan Tehsils of Pishin District

Former constituency
- Abolished: 2023
- Party: Muttahida Majlis-e-Amal
- Member: Abdul Wahid Siddique
- Created from: PB-9 Pishin-II

PB-46 Pishin-cum-Karezat ( پی بی-46 پشین-کم-کاریزات ) was a constituency of the Provincial Assembly of Balochistan.

== General elections 2013 ==
Contesting candidates	Party affiliation	Votes polled

== General elections 2008 ==
Contesting candidates	Party affiliation	Votes polled

== See also ==
- PB-45 (Quetta-IX)
- PB-47 Pishin-I
