= PB-26 Kech-II =

Constituency of the Provincial Assembly of Balochistan, Pakistan

- Constituency for the Provincial Assembly of Balochistan
- Region: Turbat Tehsil (partly) including Turbat city in Kech District

Current constituency
- Party: Balochistan National Party (Awami)
- Member: Syed Ehsan Shah
- Created from: PB-49 (Kech-II)
- Replaced by: PB-46 (Kech II)

PB-26 Kech-II (پی بی-26 کیچ-2) is a constituency of the Provincial Assembly of Balochistan.

== General elections 2024 ==
Provincial election 2024: PB-26 Kech-II
Party	Candidate	Votes	%	±%
NP	Abdul Malik Baloch	14,240	56.27	
BNP (M)	Syed Ehsan Shah	9,608	37.97	
Others	Others (thirteen candidates)	1,457	5.76	
Turnout		26,213	32.03	
Total valid votes		25,305	96.54	
Rejected ballots		908	3.46	
Majority		4,632	18.30	
Registered electors		81,845		

== See also ==
- PB-25 Kech-I
- PB-27 Kech-III
