= Khalil Francis =

Pakistani politician

- خلیل فرانسس

Minister of Human Rights and Women Empowerment
- Caretaker
- Assumed office 17 August 2023
- President: Arif Alvi
- Prime Minister: Anwaar ul Haq Kakar

Member of the National Assembly of Pakistan
- In office 1 June 2013 – 31 May 2018
- Constituency: Reserved seat for minorities

Member of the Provincial Assembly of Balochistan
- In office 22 March 2021 – 12 August 2023
- Constituency: Reserved seat for minorities

Personal details
- Party: BAP (2018-present)

Khalil George Francis (Urdu: خلیل فرانسس) is a Pakistani politician who had been a member of the National Assembly of Pakistan from June 2013 to May 2018.

== Political career ==
He was elected to the National Assembly of Pakistan as a candidate of Pakistan Muslim League (N) on a seat reserved for minorities in the 2013 Pakistani general election. During his tenure as Member of the National Assembly, he served as the Federal Parliamentary Secretary for Religious Affairs and Inter-faith Harmony.

In May 2018, he joined Balochistan Awami Party.
