= Mir Muhammad Ali Rind =

Pakistani politician

Senator Mir Muhammad Ali Rind میر محمد علی رند

Chairperson-Senate Committee on Railways
- Incumbent
- Assumed office March 2009
- President: Mamnoon Hussain
- Prime Minister: Nawaz Sharif

Personal details
- Born: Mir Muhammad Ali Rind; 1944 Turbat
- Died: 27 February 2022 (aged 77–78)
- Party: Balochistan National Party Awami (BNP-A)
- Education: B.A.
- Occupation: Politician

Mir Muhammad Ali Rind (1944–27 February 2022) was a Pakistani Politician who served as a Member of the Senate of Pakistan. During his tenure, he also held the position of Chairperson of the Senate Committee on Railway.

== Political career ==
Rind hailed from the Baluchistan province of Pakistan and was elected to the Senate of Pakistan in March 2009 on general seat as a candidate of the Balochistan National Party (Awami) (BNP-A). However, he was later disqualified by the High Court of Balochistan for concealing information regarding a prior conviction for corruption and misappropriation of public property.

He was re-elected to the Senate in a by-election for the same seat after Supreme Court of Pakistan permitted him to contest. He served as the chairperson of Senate Committee on Railway and was a member of several other committees, including Religious Affairs and Interfaith Harmony, Overseas Pakistanis and Human Resource Development, the Functional Committee on Problems of Less Developed Areas, Employees Welfare Fund, and Kashmir Affairs and Gilgit-Baltistan.

He hold the position of Vice President of Balochistan National Party (Awami) and previously served as a member of Balochistan Assembly in 1985, 1990 and 1997. He also held the portfolio of Minister of Revenue and Excise, and Taxation in 1990 and Minister for Food, Fisheries and Coastal Development in 1997 in the Balochistan Cabinet.

== See also ==
- List of Senators of Pakistan
- List of committees of the Senate of Pakistan
