= Danesh Kumar =

Pakistani politician

Member of the Senate of Pakistan
- Incumbent
- Assumed office 12 March 2021
- Constituency: Reserved seat for minorities

Member of the Provincial Assembly of Balochistan
- In office 13 August 2018 – 12 March 2021
- Succeeded by: Khalil George
- Constituency: Reserved seat for minorities

Personal details
- Born: 2 January 1976 (age 50) Quetta, Balochistan, Pakistan
- Party: BAP (2018-present)

Danesh Kumar (Urdu: دنیش کمار) is a Pakistani politician who was elected member for the Provincial Assembly of Balochistan.

== Political career ==
He was elected to Provincial Assembly of Balochistan on a reserved seat for minorities in the 2018 Pakistani general election representing Balochistan Awami Party. He is currently serving in the Senate of Pakistan.
