= Ravi Pahuja =

Member of the Provincial Assembly of Balochistan (2024–2029)

- روی پہُوجا

Member of the Provincial Assembly of Balochistan
- Incumbent
- Assumed office 29 February 2024
- Constituency: Reserved seat for minorities

Personal details
- Party: JUI (F) (2024-present)

Ravi Pahuja (Urdu: روی پہُوجا) is a Pakistani politician who is a member of the Provincial Assembly of Balochistan. He is also the president of Young Parliamentary Forum (YPF).

== Biography ==
His father name is Anand Lal. He lives in Hindu Mohalla, Dalbandin in Chagai district.

== Political career ==
Pahuja was allotted a reserved seat for minorities in Provincial Assembly of Balochistan after the 2024 Balochistan provincial election as part of the reserved quota for Jamiat Ulema-e-Islam (F).
