= Akhtar Hussain Langove =

Pakistani politician

Member of the Provincial Assembly of the Balochistan
- In office 13 August 2018 – 12 August 2023
- Constituency: PB-29 Quetta-VI

Personal details
- Party: PKMAP (2025-present)
- Other political affiliations: BNP(M) (2018-2025)

Akhtar Hussain Langove is a Pakistani politician who had been a member of the Provincial Assembly of the Balochistan from August 2018 to August 2023.
