= Patrick Sant Masih =

Member of the Provincial Assembly of Balochistan (2024–2029)

- پیٹرک سنت مسیح

Member of the Provincial Assembly of Balochistan
- Constituency: Reserved seat for minorities

Personal details
- Party: Pakistan Muslim League (N)

Patrick Sant Masih (Urdu: پیٹرک سنت مسیح) was a Pakistani politician who was member of the Provincial Assembly of Balochistan. He died on October 20, 2024 due to illness in Karachi.

== Political career ==
Masih was allotted a reserved seat for minorities in Provincial Assembly of Balochistan after the 2024 Balochistan provincial election as part of the reserved quota for Pakistan Muslim League (N).
