= PB-25 Kech-I =

Constituency of the Provincial Assembly of Balochistan, Pakistan

- Constituency for the Provincial Assembly of Balochistan
- Region: Dasht and Turbat Tehsil (partly) of Kech District

Current constituency
- Party: Balochistan Awami Party
- Member: Abdul Rauf Rind
- Created from: PB-50 (Kech-III)
- Replaced by: PB-47 Kech III

PB-25 Kech-I (پی بی-25 کیچ-1) is a constituency of the Provincial Assembly of Balochistan.

== General elections 2024 ==
Provincial election 2024: PB-25 Kech-I
Party	Candidate	Votes	%	±%
PPP	Zahoor Ahmed Buledi	9,099	60.59	
NP	Jan Mohammad	5,116	34.07	
Others	Others (fourteen candidates)	803	5.34	
Turnout		15,313	22.43	
Total valid votes		15,018	98.07	
Rejected ballots		295	1.93	
Majority		3,983	26.52	
Registered electors		68,266		

== See also ==
- PB-24 Gwadar
- PB-26 Kech-II
