= Muhammad Sarwar =

Muhammad or Mohammad Sarwar may refer to:

- Chaudhry Muhammad Sarwar Khan (1919–2003), longest serving parliamentarian of Pakistan
- Mohammad Sarwar (politician) (born 1952), British and Pakistani politician
- Mohammed Sarwar (footballer), Afghan footballer
- Mohammad Sarwar Ahmadzai (born 1971), Afghan politician
- Mohammad Sarwar Yousafzai, Afghan footballer who competed in the 1948 Summer Olympics
- Mohammad Sarwar Danish (born 1961), Afghan politician
- Muhammad Sarwar Khan (born 1942), Balochistan politician
- Muhammad Shahid Sarwar (born 1952), Pakistani Colonel
- Raja Muhammad Sarwar (1910–1948), captain of the Pakistani Army
- Mohammad Sarwar (cricketer) (born 1995), Pakistani cricketer
- Muhammad Sarwar (field hockey) (born 1975), Pakistani field hockey player
