= Sanjay Kumar (Pakistani politician) =

Member of the Provincial Assembly of Balochistan (2024–2029)

- سنجے کُمار

Member of the Provincial Assembly of Balochistan
- Incumbent
- Assumed office 29 February 2024
- Constituency: Reserved seat for minorities

Personal details
- Party: PPP (2024-present)

Sanjay Kumar (Urdu: سنجے کُمار) is a Pakistani politician who is member of the Provincial Assembly of Balochistan. He is also the Parliamentary Secretary for Minority Affairs.

== Political career ==
Kumar was allotted a reserved seat for minorities in Provincial Assembly of Balochistan after the 2024 Balochistan provincial election as part of the reserved quota for Pakistan People’s Party Parliamentarians.
