= PB-46 Quetta-IX =

Constituency of the Provincial Assembly of Balochistan, Pakistan

PB-45 Quetta-IX
- Constituency for the Provincial Assembly of Balochistan
- Region: Quetta City area of Quetta District

Current constituency
- Created: 2018
- Party: Pashtunkhwa Milli Awami Party
- Member: Nasrullah Zayrai
- Created from: PB-6 Quetta-VI; PB-31 Quetta-VIII

PB-46 Quetta-IX (پی بی-46 کوئٹہ-9) is a constituency of the Provincial Assembly of Balochistan.

== General elections 2024 ==
Provincial election 2024: PB-46 Quetta-IX
Party	Candidate	Votes	%	±%
BAP	Prince Ahmed Umer Ahmedzai	4,989	56.21	
JUI (F)	Sardar Ahmed Khan Shahwani	1,755	10.30	
BNP (M)	Malik Naseer Ahmed Shahwani	1,537	9.02	
PNAP	Hamdullah	1,440	8.45	
PPP	Riaz Ahmed	1,380	8.10	
TLP	Agha Umar	509	4.16	
Independent	Pasand Khan	439	3.86	
PMAP	Jamshed-Ur-Rehman Dotani	336	2.32	
Independent	Mir Nasir Ali Rind	285	1.43	
Independent	Mir Muhammad Ullah	239	1.16	
Others	Others (twenty six candidates)	2,724	15.99	
Turnout		17,978	33.85	
Total valid votes		17,043	94.80	
Rejected ballots		935	5.20	
Majority		2,928	16.91	
Registered electors		53,118		

== General elections 2018 ==
Contesting candidates	Party affiliation	Votes polled

== See also ==
- PB-45 Quetta-VIII
- PB-47 Pishin-I
