= Mir Akbar Mengal =

Pakistani politician

Mir Muhammad Akbar Mengal

Member of the Provincial Assembly of Balochistan
- In office 30 October 2018 – 12 August 2023
- Constituency: PB-40 Khuzdar-III

Personal details
- Party: Balochistan National Party (Mengal)

Mir Muhammad Akbar Mengal is a Pakistani politician who had been a member of the Provincial Assembly of Balochistan from October 2018 to August 2023.

== Political career ==
Mengal was elected to the Provincial Assembly of Balochistan from the constituency PB-40 in the 2018 Pakistani by-elections on the ticket of Balochistan National Party (Mengal). He defeated an independent candidate Shafiqur Rehman Mengal. He garnered 23,742 votes while his closest rival secured 14,512 votes.
