= Abdul Rauf Rind =

Pakistani politician

Member of the Provincial Assembly of the Balochistan
- In office 13 August 2018 – 12 August 2023
- Constituency: PB-47 (Kech-III)

Personal details
- Party: Balochistan Awami Party
- Parent: Mir Muhammad Ali Rind (father)

Abdul Rauf Rind is a Pakistani politician who had been a member of the Provincial Assembly of the Balochistan from August 2018 till August 2023.

== Education ==
He holds a degree of Bachelor of Business Administration.

== Political career ==
He began his political career in 2005. He was elected as nazim of Kech District in October 2005. He remained in the office until 2009.

He was elected to the Provincial Assembly of the Balochistan as a candidate of Balochistan Awami Party (BAP) from Constituency PB-47 (Kech-III) in the 2018 Pakistani general election. He received 11,942 votes and defeated Jamil Ahmed Dashti, a candidate of Balochistan National Party.

On 8 September 2018, he was inducted into the provincial Balochistan cabinet of Chief Minister Jam Kamal Khan. On 9 September, he was appointed as advisor to Chief Minister on fisheries.
