= Syed Ehsan Shah =

Pakistani politician

Provincial Minister of Health of Balochistan
- In office 8 November 2021 – 12 August 2023
- Governor: Syed Zahoor Ahmad Agha
- Chief Minister: Abdul Quddus Bizenjo

Member of the Provincial Assembly of Balochistan
- In office 13 August 2018 – 12 August 2023
- Constituency: PB-46 (Kech-II)
- In office 2008–2013
- Constituency: PB-48 (Kech-I)
- In office 2002–2007
- Constituency: PB-48 (Kech-I)
- In office 1997–1999
- Constituency: PB-37 (Kech-I)

Provincial Minister of Finance of Balochistan
- In office 2002–2007
- Governor: Amir-ul-Mulk Mengal; Abdul Qadir Baloch; Owais Ahmed Ghani; Zulfiqar Ali Khan Magsi
- Chief Minister: Jam Mohammad Yousaf
- In office 1997–1998
- Governor: Miangul Aurangzeb
- Chief Minister: Akhtar Mengal

Member of Senate of Pakistan
- In office March 1994 – March 1997
- In office March 1991 – March 1997

Personal details
- Born: 12 December 1959 (age 66) Kech Makran, Turbat, Baluchistan, Pakistan
- Party: Balochistan National Party (2021-present)
- Other political affiliations: Balochistan National Party (Awami) (2008-2021); National Alliance (Pakistan) (2001-2008); Balochistan National Party (1997-2002); Jamhoori Wattan Party (1990-1997)
- Spouse: Naseema Ehsan
- Occupation: Politician

Syed Ehsan Shah is a Pakistani politician who had been a Member of the Provincial Assembly of the Balochistan from August 2018 till August 2023.

== Political career ==
Shah served a member of the Senate of Pakistan from 1991 to 1997.

He was elected as MPA of Balochistan Assembly from constituency PB-37 (Kech-I) as a candidate of Balochistan National Party in the 1997 Pakistani general elections. Later, he served as provincial Finance Minister from 1997 to 1998 in the cabinet of then Chief Minister Akhtar Mengal.

He was re-elected as MPA of Balochistan Assembly from constituency PB-48 (Kech-I) as a candidate of National Alliance in the 2002 Pakistani general elections. He again served as Finance Minister of Balochistan from 2002 to 2007 under the chief ministership of Jam Mohammad Yousaf.

He was re-elected as MPA of Balochistan Assembly from constituency PB-48 (Kech-I) as a candidate of Balochistan National Party (Awami) in the 2008 Pakistani general elections. Later, he was also nominated as a candidate of Chief Minister of Balochistan by Balochistan National Party (Awami) but was unsuccessful in its election.

He ran for seat of the Balochistan Assembly from constituency PB-48 (Kech-I) as a candidate of Balochistan National Party (Awami) in the 2013 Pakistani general elections but was unsuccessful. He received 4149 votes and lost the seat against National Party's Abdul Malik Baloch.

He was again re-elected to Provincial Assembly of Balochistan from constituency PB-46 (Kech-II) as a candidate of Balochistan National Party (Awami) in the 2018 Pakistani general elections.

In February 2019, after owing some political differences with BNP (A)'s central leadership, he later launched his own political party named as Pakistan National Party (Awami).

In November 2021, he was inducted into the cabinet of Government of Balochistan as Provincial Minister for Health.
