= Mir Mujeeb-ur-Rehman Muhammad Hasani =

Pakistani politician

Member of the Provincial Assembly of Balochistan
- In office 29 May 2013 – 31 May 2018

Personal details
- Born: 12 November 1972 (age 53) Washuk District, Balochistan, Pakistan
- Party: PMLN (2023-present)
- Other political affiliations: BAP (2018-2023); NP (2013-2018)

Mir Mujeeb-ur-Rehman Muhammad Hasani is a Pakistani politician who was a Member of the Provincial Assembly of Balochistan, from May 2013 to May 2018.

== Early life and education ==
He was born on 12 November 1972 in Washuk District.

He has a degree in Master of Arts.

== Political career ==
He was elected to the Provincial Assembly of Balochistan as a candidate of National Party from Constituency PB-47 Washuk in the 2013 Pakistani general election.
