= 1988 Balochistan Provincial Assembly election =

1993 election in Pakistan

Elections to the Provincial Assembly of Balochistan were held in 1988.

== Results ==
Constituency-wise result
Constituency Number	Constituency Name	Name	Party
PB-1	Quetta I	Maulvi Noor Muhammad	JUI(F)
PB-2	Quetta II	Noor Mohammad	PPP
PB-3	Quetta III	Saeed Ahmed Hashmi	IJI
PB-4	Quetta IV	Arbab Muhammad Nawaz Khan	IJI
PB-5	Chagai	Haji Malik Eid Mohammad Notezai	IJI
PB-6	Pishin I	Bashir Ahmed Khan	PMAI
PB-7	Pishin II	Abdul Rehman	JUI(F)
PB-8	Pishin III	Mohammad Sarwar Khan Kakar	IJI
PB-9	Pishin IV	Abdul Hameed Khan	PMAI(PK)
PB-10	Loralai I	Sardar Muhammad Tahir Luni	IJI
PB-11	Loralai II	Maulvi Abdul Salam	JUI(F)
PB-12	Loralai III	Mir Tariq Mahmod Khan	Independent
PB-13	Zhob I	Moulana Faizullah Akhunzada	JUI(F)
PB-14	Zhob II	Maulvi Muhammad Ishaq	JUI(F)
PB-15	Zhob III	Maulvi Asmatullah	JUI(F)
PB-16	Sibi	Sardar Muhammad Khan	PPP
PB-17	Ziarat-cum-Sibi	Maulvi Jan Muhammad	JUI(F)
PB-18	Kohlu	Sardar Mir Humayun Khan	Independent
PB-19	Dera Bugti	Muhammad Akbar Khan Bugti	BNA
PB-20	Jaffarabad I	Mir Jan Muhammad Khan Jamali	IJI
PB-21	Jaffarabad II	Mir Zafrullah Khan	IJI
PB-22	Jaffarabad-cum-Nasirabad	Zahoor Hussain Khan	BNA
PB-23	Tambo	Muhammad Sadiq Umrani	Independent
PB-24	Kachhi I	Mir Muhammad Hashim	PNP
PB-25	Kachhi II	Sardar Mir Chakar Khan	Independent
PB-26	Jhal Magsi	Nawab Zulfiqar Ali Magsi	Independent
PB-27	Kalat I	Mir Muhammad Aslam	WP
PB-28	Kalat II	Muhammad Attaullah	JUI(F)
PB-29	Kalat III	Maulvi Ghulam Mustafa	JUI(F)
PB-30	Khuzdar I	Sardar Sanaullah Zehri	Independent
PB-31	Khuzdar II	Sardar Muhammad Akhtar Mengal	BNA
PB-32	Khuzdar III	Mir Abdul Majeed	IJI
PB-33	Kharan	Dost Muhammad Muhammad Hasani	Independent
PB-34	Lasbela I	Jam Muhammad Yousaf	IJI
PB-35	Lasbela II	Sardar Muhammad Saleh Bhotani	IJI
PB-36	Panjgur	Sabir Ali Baluch	PPP
PB-37	Turbat I	Abdul Malik	BNA
PB-38	Turbat II	Muhammad Ayoub	BNA
PB-39	Turbat III	Muhammad Akram	BNA
PB-40	Gwadar	Hussain	PNP
Reserved for Christian		Bashir Masih	Independent
Reserved for Hindus		Arjan Dass	Independent
Reserved for Sikhs, Buddhists, and Parsis		Faridoon Abadan	Independent
Reserved for Women		Razia Rabb	PPP
Reserved for Women		Begam Hakim Lachman Dass	BNA
