= Ahmed Nawaz Baloch =

Pakistani politician

Member of the Provincial Assembly of the Balochistan
- In office 13 August 2018 – 12 August 2023
- Constituency: PB-30 Quetta-VII

Personal details
- Party: Balochistan National Party (Mengal)

Ahmed Nawaz Baloch is a Pakistani politician who had been a member of the Provincial Assembly of the Balochistan from August 2018 to August 2023.

== Political career ==
He was elected to the Provincial Assembly of Balochistan as a candidate of Balochistan National Party (Mengal) (BNP-M) from Constituency PB-30 (Quetta XII) in the 2018 Pakistani general election. He received 10,102 votes and defeated Mir Atta Muhammad Bangulzai, a candidate of National Party. Following his successful election, BNP-M nominated him for the office of Deputy Speaker of the Provincial Assembly of the Balochistan. On 16 August 2018, he received 21 votes and lost the seat to Sardar Babar Khan Musakhel who secured 36 votes.
