= Haji Ghulam Dastagir Badeni =

Pakistani politician

Member of the Provincial Assembly of Balochistan
- In office 29 May 2013 – 31 May 2018

Personal details
- Born: 13 March 1975 (age 51) Nushki, Balochistan, Pakistan
- Party: JUI (F) (2021-present)
- Other political affiliations: Balochistan Awami Party(2018- 2021) PMLN (2013-2018)

Haji Ghulam Dastagir Badini is a Pakistani Politician and currently Member of the Provincial Assembly of Balochistan. He also remained Member of Provincial Assembly of Balochistan from May 2013 to May 2018.

== Early life and education ==
He was born on 13 March 1975 in Nushki.

He has a degree in Bachelor of Arts.

== Political career ==
He has served as Nazim in Nushki District. Currently Member of Provincial Assembly of Balochistan As a JUI-F Condidate from Constituency PB-34 Nushki He received 17,218 votes and defeated a BNP-M candidate, Mohammad Rahim who received 15,291 votes. Noshki in the 2024 Pakistani general election. He also remained Member of Provincial Assembly of Balochistan as an independent candidate from Constituency PB-40 Nushki in the 2013 Pakistani general election. He received 4,912 votes and defeated an independent candidate, Mohammad Rahim.

He joined Pakistan Muslim League (N) in June 2013 and Left in 2018. Later He Joined Balochistan Awami Party in 2018 and Left in 2021
