= Muhammad Arif (Pakistani politician) =

Pakistani politician

Muhammad Arif Muhammad Hasni

Provincial Minister of the Balochistan for communication and works
- In office 30 August 2018 – 12 August 2023

Member of the Provincial Assembly of the Balochistan
- In office 13 August 2018 – 12 August 2023
- Constituency: PB-34 (Chagai)

Personal details
- Party: PPP (2025-present)
- Other political affiliations: PPP (2023-2025) Balochistan Awami Party (2018-2023)

Mir Mohammad Arif Mohammad Hassani is a Pakistani politician who was the Provincial Minister of the Balochistan for Communication and works, in office from 30 August 2018 to 12 August 2023. He had been a member of Provincial Assembly of the Balochistan from August 2018 to August 2023.

== Political career ==
He was elected to the Provincial Assembly of the Balochistan as an independent candidate from Constituency PB - 34 (Chagai) in the 2018 Pakistani General Election.

On 27 August 2018, he was inducted into the provincial Balochistan cabinet of Chief Minister of Jam Kamal Khan. On 30 August, he was appointed as Provincial Minister of Balochistan for Finance.
