= Sardar Ghulam Mustafa Khan Tareen =

Pakistani politician

Member of the Provincial Assembly of Balochistan
- In office 29 May 2013 – 31 May 2018
- Constituency: PB-10 (Pishin-III)

Provincial Minister of Balochistan for Local Government and Rural Development
- In office 2013–2018

Personal details
- Born: 1 January 1950 Pishin, Balochistan, Pakistan
- Died: 22 April 2020 (aged 70) Quetta, Balochistan, Pakistan
- Party: Pashtunkhwa Milli Awami Party

Sardar Ghulam Mustafa Khan Tareen was a Pakistani politician who was a Member of the Provincial Assembly of Balochistan, from May 2013 to May 2018.

He died on 22 April 2020 after testing positive for COVID-19 during the COVID-19 pandemic in Pakistan.

== Early life and education ==
He was born on 1 January 1950 in Pishin District.

He has done Matriculation.

== Political career ==
He was elected to the Provincial Assembly of Balochistan as a candidate of Pashtunkhwa Milli Awami Party from Constituency PB-10-Pishin-III in the 2013 Pakistani general election.
