= Babu Rahim Mengal =

Pakistani politician

Babu Muhammad Rahim Mengal

Member of the Provincial Assembly of the Balochistan
- In office 13 August 2018 – 12 August 2023
- Constituency: PB-33 Nushki

Personal details
- Party: BNP(M) (2018-present)

Babu Muhammad Rahim Mengal is a Pakistani politician who has been a member of the Provincial Assembly of the Balochistan from August 2018 to August 2023 and previously served as Minister of PDMA and Tourism Balochistan from 2008-2013.
