= Mastoora Bibi =

Pakistani politician

Member of the Provincial Assembly of Balochistan
- In office 13 August 2018 – 12 August 2023
- Constituency: Reserved for women

Personal details
- Party: Balochistan National Party (Awami)

Mastoora Bibi is a Pakistani politician who had been a member of the Provincial Assembly of Balochistan from August 2018 to August 2023.

== Political career ==
Bibi was elected to the Provincial Assembly of Balochistan as a candidate of Balochistan National Party (Awami) (BNP (Awami)) on a reserved seat for women in consequence of the 2018 Pakistani general election. She assumed the membership of the assembly on 13 August 2018.
