= Rubaba Khan Buledi =

Pakistani politician

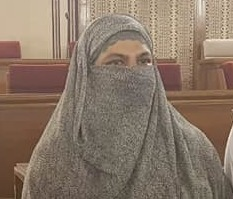

Member of the Provincial Assembly of Balochistan
- Incumbent
- Assumed office February 29, 2024
- Constituency: Reserved seat for women

Member of the Provincial Assembly of Balochistan
- In office 13 August 2018 – 12 August 2023

Personal details
- Party: PMLN (2023-present)
- Other political affiliations: BAP (2018-2023)

Rubaba Khan Buledi is a Pakistani politician who is serving as a member of the Provincial Assembly of Balochistan since February 29, 2024. Previously she served from August 2018 to August 2023.

== Political career ==
She was elected to the Provincial Assembly of Balochistan as a candidate of Balochistan Awami Party on a reserved seat for women in the 2018 Pakistani general election.
