= Titus Johnson =

Pakistani politician

Member of the Provincial Assembly of Balochistan
- In office 13 August 2018 – 12 August 2023
- Constituency: Reserved seat for minorities

Personal details
- Party: Balochistan National Party (Mengal)

Titus Johnson (Urdu: طِطُس جانسن) is a Pakistani politician who had been a member for the Provincial Assembly of Balochistan from August 2018 to August 2023.

== Political career ==
He was elected to Provincial Assembly of Balochistan on a reserved seat for minorities in the 2018 Pakistani general election representing Balochistan National Party (Mengal).
