= Zeenat Shahwani =

Pakistani politician

Member of the Provincial Assembly of Balochistan
- In office 13 August 2018 – 12 August 2023
- Constituency: Reserved seat for women

Personal details
- Party: Pakistan Muslim League (N) (2023-present)
- Other political affiliations: Balochistan National Party (Mengal) (2018-2023)

Zeenat Shahwani is a Pakistani politician who had been a member of the Provincial Assembly of Balochistan from August 2018 to August 2023.

== Political career ==
She was elected to the Provincial Assembly of Balochistan as a candidate of Balochistan National Party (Mengal) on a reserved seat for women in the 2018 Pakistani general election.
