= PB-23 Killa Abdullah-III =

Former constituency of the Provincial Assembly of Balochistan, Pakistan

- Former constituency for the Provincial Assembly of Balochistan
- Region: Killa Abdullah District

Former constituency
- Abolished: 2023
- Party: Awami National Party
- Member: Asghar Khan Achakzai
- Created from: PB-11 Killa Abdullah-I

PB-23 Killa Abdullah-III (پی بی-23 قلعہ عبداللہ-3) was a constituency of the Provincial Assembly of Balochistan.

== General elections 2013 ==
Contesting candidates	Party affiliation	Votes polled

== General elections 2008 ==
Contesting candidates	Party affiliation	Votes polled

== See also ==
- PB-50 Chaman-I
- PB-1 Sherani-cum-Zhob
