= Mir Sikandar Ali =

Pakistani politician

Mir Sikandar Ali Umrani

Member of the Provincial Assembly of the Balochistan
- In office 13 August 2018 – 12 August 2023
- Constituency: PB-11 Nasirabad-I

Personal details
- Party: JWP (2025-present)
- Other political affiliations: BAP (2018-2025)

Mir Sikandar Ali is a Pakistani politician who had been a member of the Provincial Assembly of the Balochistan from August 2018 to August 2023.
