= Muhammad Khan Lehri =

Pakistani politician

Member of the Provincial Assembly of Balochistan
- In office 13 August 2018 – 12 August 2023
- Constituency: PB-12 Nasirabad-II
- In office 31 August 2013 – 31 May 2018

Personal details
- Party: PMLN (2013-2018; 2023-present)
- Other political affiliations: BAP (2018-2023)

Muhammad Khan Lehri is a Pakistani politician who had been a member of the Provincial Assembly of Balochistan from August 2018 to August 2023 and from August 2013 to May 2018.

== Political career ==
He was elected to the Provincial Assembly of Balochistan as a candidate of Pakistan Muslim League (N) from Constituency PB-29 Naseerabad-II in by-election held in August 2013.

He was re-elected to Provincial Assembly of Balochistan as a candidate of Balochistan Awami Party (BAP) from Constituency PB-12 (Nasirabad-II) in the 2018 Pakistani general election.
