= Yar Muhammad Rind =

Pakistani politician

- سردار یار محمد رند

Special Assistant to Prime Minister on Activities pertaining to Ministries of Water Resources, Power and Petroleum in the Balochistan
- In office 20 March 2019 – 10 April 2022
- President: Arif Alvi
- Prime Minister: Imran Khan

Provincial Minister of Balochistan for Secondary Education and Colleges, Technical and Higher Education
- In office 23 January 2020 – 12 August 2023
- Governor: Amanullah Khan Yasinzai
- Chief Minister: Jam Kamal Khan

President Pakistan Tehreek-e-Insaf Balochistan Chapter (PTI)
- In office 2015 – 25 December 2021
- Chairman: Imran Khan
- Vice Chairman: Shah Mahmood Qureshi
- Succeeded by: Qasim Suri

Leader of the Opposition in Provincial Assembly of Balochistan
- In office 2008–2013

Federal Minister for Food, Agriculture and Livestock
- In office 30 June 2004 – 25 August 2004
- President: Pervez Musharraf
- Prime Minister: Shujat Hussain
- In office 23 November 2002 – 26 June 2004
- President: Pervez Musharraf
- Prime Minister: Mir Zafarullah Khan Jamali

Member of the Provincial Assembly of Balochistan (MPA)
- In office 13 August 2018 – 12 August 2023
- Constituency: PB-17 Kachhi-cum-Mastung
- In office 2008–2013
- Constituency: PB-30 Bolan-I

Member of the National Assembly of Pakistan (MNA)
- In office 2002–2007
- Constituency: NA-267 Kachhi
- In office 1997–1999
- Constituency: NA-201 Jhal Magsi-cum- Bolan (Kachhi)
- In office 1993–1996
- Constituency: NA-201 Jhal Magsi-cum- Bolan (Kachhi)
- In office 1990–1993
- Constituency: NA-201 Kachhi

Member of the Senate of Pakistan (Senator)
- In office March 1985 – March 1988
- Constituency: General Seat Balochistan

Personal details
- Party: (2025-present)
- Other political affiliations: PTI (2021-2018); PML(Q) (2008-2012); IND (2008-2013)

Sardar Yar Muhammad Rind is a Pakistani politician who had been a member of the Provincial Assembly of the Balochistan from August 2018 to August 2023. He was the President of Pakistan Tehreek-e-Insaf Balochistan Chapter and Parliamentary Leader of PTI in Provincial Assembly of Balochistan.

Rind was the Parliamentary Leader of PTI in Provincial Assembly of Balochistan after the 2018 Balochistan Provincial Elections.

He has served as the Special Assistant to Prime Minister on Activities pertaining to Ministries of Water Resources, Power and Petroleum in the Balochistan in the Federal Cabinet of Pakistan, appointed on 20 March 2019.

He is also serving as the Provincial Minister for Secondary Education & Colleges, Technical & Higher Education in the Provincial Cabinet of Balochistan since 23 January 2020.

Rind was the President of Pakistan Tehreek-e-Insaf for Balochistan in 2015 until he was no longer in the position.

He has served as the Leader of the Opposition in the Provincial Assembly of Balochistan from 2008 till 2013.

He served as a Federal Minister from 2002 to 2007 during the government of Pakistan Muslim League (Q).

He has been elected as a Senator, MNA and MPA various times since 1985 till date.
