= Agha Syed Liaqat Ali =

Pakistani politician

Member of the Provincial Assembly of Balochistan
- In office 29 May 2013 – 31 May 2018

Personal details
- Born: 1 January 1946 (age 80) Pishin District
- Other political affiliations: Pashtunkhwa Milli Awami Party

Agha Syed Liaqat Ali is a Pakistani politician who was a Member of the Provincial Assembly of Balochistan, from May 2013 to May 2018.

== Early life ==
He was born on 1 January 1946 in Pishin District.

== Political career ==
He was elected to the Provincial Assembly of Balochistan as a candidate of Pashtunkhwa Milli Awami Party from Constituency PB-8-Pishin-I in the 2013 Pakistani general election. He received 13,741 votes and defeated a candidate of Jamiat Ulema-e Islam (F).
