= Muhammad Mobeen Khan =

Pakistani politician

Member of the Provincial Assembly of the Balochistan
- In office 13 August 2018 – 12 August 2023
- Constituency: PB-28 Quetta-V

Personal details
- Other political affiliations: PTI (2018-2023)

Muhammad Mobeen Khan is a Pakistani politician who had been a member of the Provincial Assembly of the Balochistan from August 2018 till August 2023.
