= Bano Khalil Ahmed =

Pakistani politician

Member of the Provincial Assembly of Balochistan
- In office 13 August 2018 – 12 August 2023
- Constituency: Reserved for women

Personal details
- Born: 10 November 1969 (age 56) Jacobabad, Sindh, Pakistan
- Party: Muttahida Majlis-e-Amal
- Spouse: Hafiz Khalil Ahmed

Bano Khalil Ahmed is a Pakistani politician who had been a member of the Provincial Assembly of Balochistan from August 2018 to August 2023.

== Personal life ==
Bano was born on 10 November 1969 in Jacobabad, located in Sindh province of Pakistan. She is married to Hafiz Khalil Ahmed and lives in Quetta, Balochistan, Pakistan.

== Political career ==
Bano was elected to the Provincial Assembly of Balochistan as a candidate of Muttahida Majlis-e-Amal (MMA). She was elected on a reserved seat for women, a consequence of the 2018 Pakistani general election. She assumed membership of the assembly on 13 August 2018.
