= Mir Zafarullah Khan Zehri =

Pakistani politician

Member of the Provincial Assembly of Balochistan
- In office 2008 – 31 May 2018
- Incumbent
- Assumed office 28 February 2024

Personal details
- Born: 6 September 1975 (age 50) Karachi, Sindh, Pakistan
- Party: JUI (F) (2024-present)
- Relatives: Nawab Sanaullah Khan Zehri (brother); Israr Ullah Zehri (brother)

Mir Zafarullah Khan Zehri is a Pakistani politician who was a Member of the from 2008 to May 2018. On February 8, 2024, Zehri was re-elected as Provincial Assembly of Balochistan.

== Early life and education ==
He was born on 6 September 1975 in Karachi.

He has a degree in Bachelor of Arts.

He is brother of Nawab Sanaullah Khan Zehri and Israr Ullah Zehri.

== Political career ==
He was elected to the Provincial Assembly of Balochistan as a candidate of Balochistan National Party Awami (BNAP) from Constituency PB-37 Kalat in the 2008 Pakistani general election.

He was re-elected to the Provincial Assembly of Balochistan as a candidate of BNAP from Constituency PB-37 Kalat-II in the 2013 Pakistani general election.

He is re-elected to the Provincial Assembly of Balochistan as Jamiat Ulema-e-Islam (F) from co
