= Mir Zabid Ali Reki =

Pakistani politician

Member of the Provincial Assembly of the Balochistan
- In office 30 October 2018 – 12 August 2023
- Constituency: PB-41 Washuk

Personal details
- Party: JUI (F) (2018-present)

Mir Zabid Ali Reki is a Pakistani politician who had been a member of the Provincial Assembly of the Balochistan from October 2018 to August 2023.

== Political career ==
Reki contested the 2018 Pakistani general election from constituency PB-41 of Provincial Assembly of the Balochistan on the ticket of Muttahida Majlis-e-Amal. He won the election by the majority of 460 votes over the runner up Mir Mujeebur Rehman Muhammad Hassani of Balochistan Awami Party. He garnered 12,782 votes while Hassani received 12,322 votes. Hassani contested the results with Election Commission of Pakistan (ECP) based on purported abduction of the presiding officer, ECP ordered the re-election in 2 polling stations of this constituency out of a total of 98 polling stations.

Re-election on two polling stations of PB-41 was held on 7 October 2018. Reki became the member of Balochistan Assembly after the re-election.
