= Muhammad Khan Toor Utmankhel =

Pakistani politician

Member of the Provincial Assembly of the Balochistan
- In office 13 August 2018 – 12 August 2023
- Constituency: PB-4 Loralai

Personal details
- Party: PMLN (2023-present)
- Other political affiliations: BAP (2018-2023)

Muhammad Khan Toor Utmankhel is a Pakistani politician who had been a member of the Provincial Assembly of Balochistan from August 2018 to August 2023 and was the Commerce and Trade Minister of Balochistan. He belongs to the Utmankhel tribe/community in Balochistan.

On 8 October 2018, he was inducted into the provincial Balochistan cabinet of Chief Minister Jam Kamal Khan.
