= Ghazala Gola =

Pakistani politician (born 1952)

Deputy Speaker of Provincial Assembly of Balochistan
- Incumbent
- Assumed office 29 February 2024
- Speaker: Abdul Khaliq Khan Achakzai
- Preceded by: Sardar Babar Khan Musakhel

Provincial Minister of Balochistan for Social Welfare And Women's Development
- In office 2008–2013

Member of the Provincial Assembly of Balochistan
- Incumbent
- Assumed office 29 February 2024
- Constituency: Reserved seat for women
- In office 2008–2013
- Constituency: Reserved seat for women

Personal details
- Born: Sohbatpur, Pakistan
- Party: PPP (2008-present)

Ghazala Gola (born 1952) is a Pakistani politician who is currently serving as the Deputy Speaker of the Provincial Assembly of Balochistan since February 2024.

== Life ==
Ghazala Gola was born in 1952 in Sohbatpur. She received her primary education from Joseph Convent School, Quetta.

== Political career ==
She was elected to the Provincial Assembly of the Balochistan as a Pakistan People's Party candidate from reserved seats for women in the 2008 Balochistan provincial election. Later, she was inducted in the provincial cabinet of Aslam Raisani as Provincial Minister for Social Welfare And Women's Development.

In February 2024, she was reelected to the Provincial Assembly of Balochistan and later was elected as the Deputy Speaker of Provincial Assembly of Balochistan.
