= 1990 Balochistan Provincial Assembly election =

1993 election in Pakistan

Elections to the Provincial Assembly of Balochistan were held in 1990.

== Results ==
Constituency-wise result
Constituency Number	Constituency Name	Name	Party
PB-1	Quetta I	Kalimullah Khan	PKMAP
PB-2	Quetta II	Noor Mohammad	PDA
PB-3	Quetta III	Saeed Ahmed Hashmi	IJI
PB-4	Quetta IV	Malik Sikander Khan	JUI
PB-5	Chagai	Haji Ali Mohammad Notezai	JWP
PB-6	Pishin I	Maulana Abdul Bari	JUI(F)
PB-7	Pishin II	Abdul Qahar Khan Wadan	PKMAP
PB-8	Pishin III	Mohammad Sarwar Khan Kakar	IJI
PB-9	Pishin IV	Abdul Hameed Khan	PKMAP
PB-10	Loralai I	Sardar Muhammad Tahir Luni	JWP
PB-11	Loralai II	Maulvi Amir Zaman	JUI(F)
PB-12	Loralai III	Mir Baz Muhammad Khan Khetran	PDA
PB-13	Zhob-cum-Killa Saifullah	Haji Muhammad Shah	IJI
PB-14	Zhob	Shaikh Haji Jaffar Khan Mandokhail	IJI
PB-15	Killa Saifullah	Maulvi Asmatullah	JUI(F)
PB-16	Sibi	Haji Malik Karam Khan	JWP
PB-17	Ziarat-cum-Sibi	Maulvi Niaz Muhammad	JUI
PB-18	Kohlu	Sardar Mir Humayun Khan	JWP
PB-19	Dera Bugti	Muhammad Akbar Khan Bugti	JWP
PB-20	Jaffarabad I	Mir Jan Muhammad Khan	Independent
PB-21	Jaffarabad II	Mir Taj Muhammad	IJI
PB-22	Jaffarabad-cum-Nasirabad	Zahoor Hussain Khan	JWP
PB-23	Tambo	Sardar Fateh Ali Umrani	JWP
PB-24	Kachhi I	Mohammad Asim Kurd Galloo	JWP
PB-25	Kachhi II	Sardar Mir Chakar Khan	Independent
PB-26	Jhal Magsi	Nawab Zulfiqar Ali Magsi	Independent
PB-27	Kalat I	Nawab Muhammad Aslam Raisani	PNP
PB-28	Kalat II	Moulvi Abdool Ghafoor Haideri	JUI(F)
PB-29	Kalat III	Mir Israrullah Zehri	Independent
PB-30	Khuzdar I	Sardar Sanaullah Zehri	PNP
PB-31	Khuzdar II	Mir Muhammad Aslam Bizenjo	PNP
PB-32	Khuzdar III	Mir Abdul Majeed	IJI
PB-33	Kharan	Mir Abdul Karim Nosherwani	JWP
PB-34	Lasbela I	Jam Muhammad Yousaf	IJI
PB-35	Lasbela II	Sardar Muhammad Saleh Bhotani	Independent
PB-36	Panjgur	Kachkol Ali	BNM
PB-37	Turbat I	Abdul Malik	BNM
PB-38	Turbat II	Munshi Muhammad	JWP
PB-39	Turbat III	Muhammad Ali Rind	PNP
PB-40	Gwadar	Hussain	PNP
Reserved for Christian		Johnson Ashraf	APCM
Reserved for Hindus		Arjan Das	PHP
Reserved for Sikhs, Buddhists, and Parsis		Sanat Singh	Independent
