= Mir Muhammad Sadiq Umrani =

Pakistani politician

Member of the Provincial Assembly of Balochistan
- Incumbent
- Assumed office 29 February 2024
- Constituency: PB-13 Nasirabad-I

Personal details
- Born: Nasirabad District, Balochistan, Pakistan
- Political party: PPP (1983-present)

Mir Muhammad Sadiq Umrani is a Pakistani politician from Nasirabad District. He is currently serving as a member of the Provincial Assembly of Balochistan since February 2024. He is Minister of Irrigation of Balochistan province.

== Career ==
He contested the 2024 general elections as a Pakistan People’s Party candidate from PB-13 Nasirabad-I. He secured 14,856 votes while the runner-up was Balochistan Awami Party who secured 9,505 votes.
