= Malik Naseer Ahmed Shahwani =

Pakistani politician

Member of the Provincial Assembly of Balochistan
- In office 13 August 2018 – 12 August 2023
- Constituency: PB-32 Quetta-IX

Personal details
- Party: TLP (2025-present)
- Other political affiliations: BNP(M) (2018-2025)

Malik Naseer Ahmed Shahwani is a Pakistani politician who had been a member of the Provincial Assembly of Balochistan from August 2018 to August 2023.

== Political career ==
Shahwani was elected to the Provincial Assembly of Balochistan as a candidate of Balochistan National Party (Mengal) (BNP-M) from the constituency PB-32 in the 2018 Pakistani general election held on 25 July 2018. He defeated Abdul Ghafoor Haideri of Muttahida Majlis-e-Amal (MMA). Shahwani garnered 6,795 votes, while his closest rival secured 4,434 votes.
