= Muhammad Sarwar Khan =

Pakistani politician (1942–2008)

Muhammad Sarwar Khan Kakar

Member of the Provincial Assembly of the Balochistan
- In office 1 October 2002 – 30 September 2007
- Constituency: PB-50 (Pishin)
- In office 2 February 1997 – 12 October 1999
- Constituency: PB-50 (Pishin)

Personal details
- Born: 18 February 1942 Pishin District
- Died: 21 February 2008 (aged 66)
- Party: Pakistan Muslim League (Q)
- Parent: Abdul Khaliq khan kakar (father)

Muhammad Sarwar Khan Kakar (Pashto: سرور خان کاکړ) was a Pakistani former politician who served as the third Speaker of the Balochistan Assembly from 1985 to 1988. His elder brother, Senator Khalid khan served the nation as an advisor to Prime Minister Benazir Bhutto. He was the head of the Kakar Pashtun tribe in Balochistan. He was from the Barshore and Toba Kakar Ranges area of Pishin District.

He was born in 1942 to a well known family of the region. His father Abdul Khaliq khan kakar was also a Prominent personality as he was the member of the constituent assembly of Pakistan from the Quetta/Pishin region from 1950 till 1958. Sarwar khan kakar Studied at St. Michael's School, Quetta. His political career began in 1979, when he became the Chairman of Pishin District Council, serving in that role until 1984. From 1985 to 1999, he was elected five times to represent Pishin in the Provincial Assembly of Balochistan and served as the Speaker of the Assembly from 1985 to 1988.

== Political career ==
He was a Provincial Minister from 1990 to 1993 and 1997–1999, with various portfolios including education, finance, transport, excise and taxation, revenue, and sports.

He was elected to the Senate of Pakistan in 2005 on a PML-Q ticket, and was the Chairman of the Senate Standing Committee on Local Government and Rural Areas. On 18 February 2008, Sarwar Khan was a candidate for elections to the National Assembly of Pakistan and the Provincial Assembly of Balochistan, winning a seat in the provincial election.

== Death ==
However, before he could take up his seat in the provincial Assembly, he died on 21 February 2008 and his seat was given to his nephew Khan Asfandiyar Khan Kakar. He left behind 2 wives and 1 daughter, Ayesha Sarwer Kakar, who is a doctor (MBBS from CMH Medical College Quetta).
