= Fareeda Bibi =

Pakistani politician

Provincial Assembly of Balochistan
- In office 13 August 2018 – 12 August 2023
- Constituency: Reserved seat for women

Personal details
- Born: 22 August Dhadar
- Party: PTI (2018-present)

Fareeda Bibi is a Pakistani politician who had been a member of the Provincial Assembly of Balochistan from August 2018 to August 2023.

== Political career ==
She was elected to the Provincial Assembly of Balochistan as a candidate of Pakistan Tehreek-e-Insaf on a reserved seat for women in the 2018 Pakistani general election.
