= Asfand Yar Khan Kakar =

Pakistani politician

Member of the Provincial Assembly of Balochistan
- Incumbent
- Assumed office 29 February 2024

Member of the Provincial Assembly of Balochistan
- In office 2008–2013

Minister for Food, Balochistan
- In office 2008–2013

Personal details
- Born: 1 June 1980 (age 45) Tehsil Barshore, District Pishin, Pakistan
- Party: PPP (2013-present)
- Profession: Politician
- Known for: Head of Kakar Tribe

Asfand Yar Khan Kakar is a Pakistani politician and ethnic Pashtun tribesman. He is currently serving as a member of the Provincial Assembly of Balochistan since February 2024. He has also served from 2008 to 2013.

He is a native of Tehsil Barshore of District Pishin, and Head of Kakar Tribe. His affiliation is with Pakistan Peoples Party and has been Minister for Food within the provincial cabinet from 2008 to 2013.

In February 2024, his campaign office was bombed, killing dozens, the day before the 2024 Pakistani general election.
