= Sardar Babar Khan Musakhel =

Pakistani politician

Deputy Speaker of the Provincial Assembly of the Balochistan
- In office 16 August 2018 – 12 August 2023
- Speaker: Abdul Quddus Bizenjo; Jan Muhammad Jamali
- Preceded by: Abdul Quddus Bizenjo
- Succeeded by: Ghazala Gola

Member of the Provincial Assembly of the Balochistan
- In office 13 August 2018 – 12 August 2023
- Constituency: PB-1 Musakhel-cum-Sherani

Personal details
- Party: PTI (2018-present)

Sardar Babar Khan Musakhel is a Pakistani politician who was the current Deputy Speaker of the Provincial Assembly of the Balochistan, in office from August 2018 to August 2023. He had been a member of the Provincial Assembly of the Balochistan from August 2018 to August 2023.

== Political career ==
He was elected to the Provincial Assembly of the Balochistan as a candidate of Pakistan Tehreek-e-Insaf (PTI) from Constituency PB-1 (Musakhel-cum-Sherani) in the 2018 Pakistani general election. Following his successful election, PTI nominated him for the office of Deputy Speaker of the Provincial Assembly of the Balochistan. On 16 August 2018, he was elected as Deputy Speaker of the Balochistan Assembly. He received 36 votes against his opponent Ahmed Nawaz Baloch who secured 21 votes.
