= Sardar Masood Ali Khan Luni =

Pakistani politician

Member of the Provincial Assembly of the Balochistan
- In office 13 August 2018 – 12 August 2023
- Constituency: PB-5 Dukki

Personal details
- Party: PMLN (2023-present)
- Other political affiliations: BAP (2018-2023)

Sardar Masood Ali Khan Luni is a Pakistani politician who had been a member of the Provincial Assembly of the Balochistan from August 2018 to August 2023.
