= Mir Hamal Kalmati =

Pakistani politician

Mir Hammal Kalmati

Member of the Provincial Assembly of Balochistan
- In office 13 August 2018 – 12 August 2023
- Constituency: PB-51 Gwadar
- In office 2008 – August 2023
- Constituency: PB-51 Gwadar

Personal details
- Born: 25 September 1979 (age 46)
- Party: BNP(M); PML(Q) (2008)

Mir Hammal Kalmati (born 25 September 1979) is a Pakistani politician who served as a Member of the Provincial Assembly of Balochistan from 2008 until August 2023.

== Early life ==
He was born on 25 September 1979.

== Political career ==
Mir Hammal Kalmati is a seasoned politician from the province of Balochistan. He has been actively involved in politics and has represented his constituency in various capacities. His political career is notable for his affiliation with several parties.

He was elected to the Provincial Assembly of Balochistan as a candidate of the Pakistan Muslim League (Q) from Constituency PB-51 Gwadar in the 2008 Pakistani general election. He received 15,343 votes, defeating an independent candidate, Ashraf.

In 2008, he was appointed Minister of Fisheries for Balochistan and served in this role until 2013.

He was re-elected to the Provincial Assembly of Balochistan as a candidate of the Balochistan National Party (Mengal) (BNP-M) from Constituency PB-51 Gwadar in the 2013 Pakistani general election. He received 13,944 votes, defeating Yaqoob Bizanjo.

He was re-elected to the Provincial Assembly of Balochistan as a candidate of BNP-M from Constituency PB-51 (Gwadar) in the 2018 Pakistani general election.

He received 31,248 votes, once again defeating Yaqoob Bizanjo, and served in office from 13 August 2018 until 12 August 2023.
