= Muhammad Nawaz Khan Kakar =

Politician in Pakistan

Member of the Provincial Assembly of the Balochistan
- In office 13 August 2018 – 12 August 2023
- Constituency: PB-22 (Killa Abdullah-II)

Personal details
- Party: PKMAP (2025-present)
- Other political affiliations: JUI (F) (2018-2025)

Muhammad Nawaz Khan Kakar is a Pakistani politician who had been a member of the Provincial Assembly of the Balochistan from August 2018 to August 2023.

== Political career ==
He was elected to the Provincial Assembly of the Balochistan as a candidate of Muttahida Majlis-e-Amal (MMA) from Constituency PB-22 (Killa Abdullah-II) in the 2018 Pakistani general election. Following his successful election, he was nominated by the opposition parties as their joint candidate for the office of Speaker of the Provincial Assembly of Balochistan. On 16 August 2018, he received 20 votes and lost the seat to Abdul Quddus Bizenjo who secured 39 votes.
