= Mir Naimatullah Zehri =

Pakistani politician

Member-elect for the Provincial Assembly of Balochistan
- In office 13 August 2018 – 12 August 2023
- Constituency: PB-36 Shaheed Sikandarabad

Member of the Senate of Pakistan
- In office March 2015 – 12 August 2018

Personal details
- Party: BNP(M) (2025-present)
- Other political affiliations: PMLN (2015-2024); PTI (2018-2023)
- Relations: Sanaullah Khan Zehri (brother)

Mir Naimatullah Zehri (Urdu: میر نعمت اللہ زہری) is a Pakistani politician who had been a member of the Provincial Assembly of Balochistan from August 2018 to August 2023.

== Political career ==
He was elected to the Senate of Pakistan as a candidate of Pakistan Muslim League (N) in the 2015 Pakistani Senate election.

He was elected to the Provincial Assembly of Balochistan as an independent candidate from Constituency PB-36 (Shaheed Sikandarabad) in the 2018 Pakistani general election. Following his successful election, he joined Pakistan Tehreek-e-Insaf (PTI). He resigned as a senator on 12 August 2018 to continue as a member of the provincial assembly.
