= Asghar Ali Tareen =

Politician in Pakistan, Member Jui

Member of the Provincial Assembly of the Balochistan
- In office 13 August 2018 – 12 August 2023
- Constituency: PB-19 Pishin-II

Personal details
- Party: JUI (F) (2018-present)

Asghar Ali Tareen is a Pakistani politician who had been a member of the Provincial Assembly of the Balochistan from August 2018 to August 2023.
