= Malik Naeem Khan Bazai =

Pakistani politician

Member of the Provincial Assembly of the Balochistan
- Incumbent
- Assumed office 29 February 2024
- Constituency: PB-38 Quetta-I
- In office 13 August 2018 – 12 August 2023
- Constituency: PB-24 Quetta-I

Personal details
- Party: ANP (2018-present)

Malik Naeem Khan Bazai is a Pakistani politician who had been a member of the Provincial Assembly of the Balochistan from August 2018 to August 2023.

On 8 September 2018, he was inducted into the provincial Balochistan cabinet of Chief Minister Jam Kamal Khan. On 9 September, he was made advisor on excise and taxation.
