= Malik Sikandar Khan (Balochistan politician) =

Pakistani politician

Leader of the Opposition in the Provincial Assembly of the Balochistan
- In office 16 December 2018 – 12 August 2023

Member of the Provincial Assembly of the Balochistan
- In office 13 August 2018 – 12 August 2023
- Constituency: PB-25 Quetta-II

7th Speaker of the Provincial Assembly of Balochistan
- In office 11 November 1990 – 19 October 1993
- Preceded by: Mir Zahoor Hussain Khan Khosa
- Succeeded by: Abdul Waheed Baloch

Personal details
- Party: Jamiat Ulema-e-Islam (F)
- Other political affiliations: Muttahida Majlis-e-Amal

Malik Sikandar Khan is a Pakistani politician who was the Leader of the Opposition in and a member of the Provincial Assembly of the Balochistan.

He previously has served as Speaker of Balochistan Assembly from 1990 to 1993.
