= Naseebullah Khan =

Pakistani politician

Provincial Minister of the Balochistan for Health
- In office 30 August 2018 – 12 August 2023
- In office 13 August 2018 – 12 August 2023

Personal details
- Party: PTI (2018-present)

Naseebullah Khan is a Pakistani politician who was the Provincial Minister of the Balochistan for Health, in office from 30 August 2018 to 12 August 2023. He had been a member of Provincial Assembly of the Balochistan from August 2018 to August 2023.

== Political career ==
He was elected to the Provincial Assembly of the Balochistan as a candidate of Pakistan Tehreek-e-Insaf in the 2018 Pakistani general election.

On 27 August 2018, he was inducted into the provincial Balochistan cabinet of Chief Minister of Jam Kamal Khan. On 30 August, he was appointed as Provincial Minister of Balochistan for Health.
