= Abdul Wahid Siddique =

Pakistani politician

Abdul Wahid Siddiqui

Member of the Provincial Assembly of Balochistan
- In office 13 August 2018 – 12 August 2023
- Constituency: PB-18 Pishin-I

Personal details
- Born: 18/08/1965 Khanozai
- Party: Jamiat Ulama-e-Islam (F)

Abdul Wahid Siddiqui is a Pakistani politician who had been a member of the Provincial Assembly Balochistan from August 2018 to August 2023. He was also the Chairman of Standing Committee For Education and has served as education minister of Balochistan.
