= Mir Asadullah Baloch =

Pakistani politician

Member of the Provincial Assembly of the Balochistan
- In office 13 August 2018 – 12 August 2023
- Constituency: PB-43 Panjgur

Personal details
- Party: BNP(A) (2018-present)
- Other political affiliations: TTAP (2025-present)

Mir Asadullah Baloch is a Pakistani politician who had been a member of the Provincial Assembly of the Balochistan from August 2018 till August 2023.

On 8 September 2018, he was inducted into the provincial cabinet. On 9 September, he was made minister for Food and Social Welfare & Non-Formal Education.
