= Balochistan National Party – Awami =

National party

Balochistan National Party – Awami بلوچستان نیشنل پارٹی – عوامی
- Abbreviation: BNP(A)
- President: Mir Asadullah Baloch
- Founder: Israr Ullah Zehri
- Founded: 1998; 28 years ago
- Split from: BNP(M)
- Ideology: Regionalism; Baloch nationalism
- National affiliation: TTAP
- Balochistan Assembly: 1 / 65

Election symbol
- Camel

Party flag
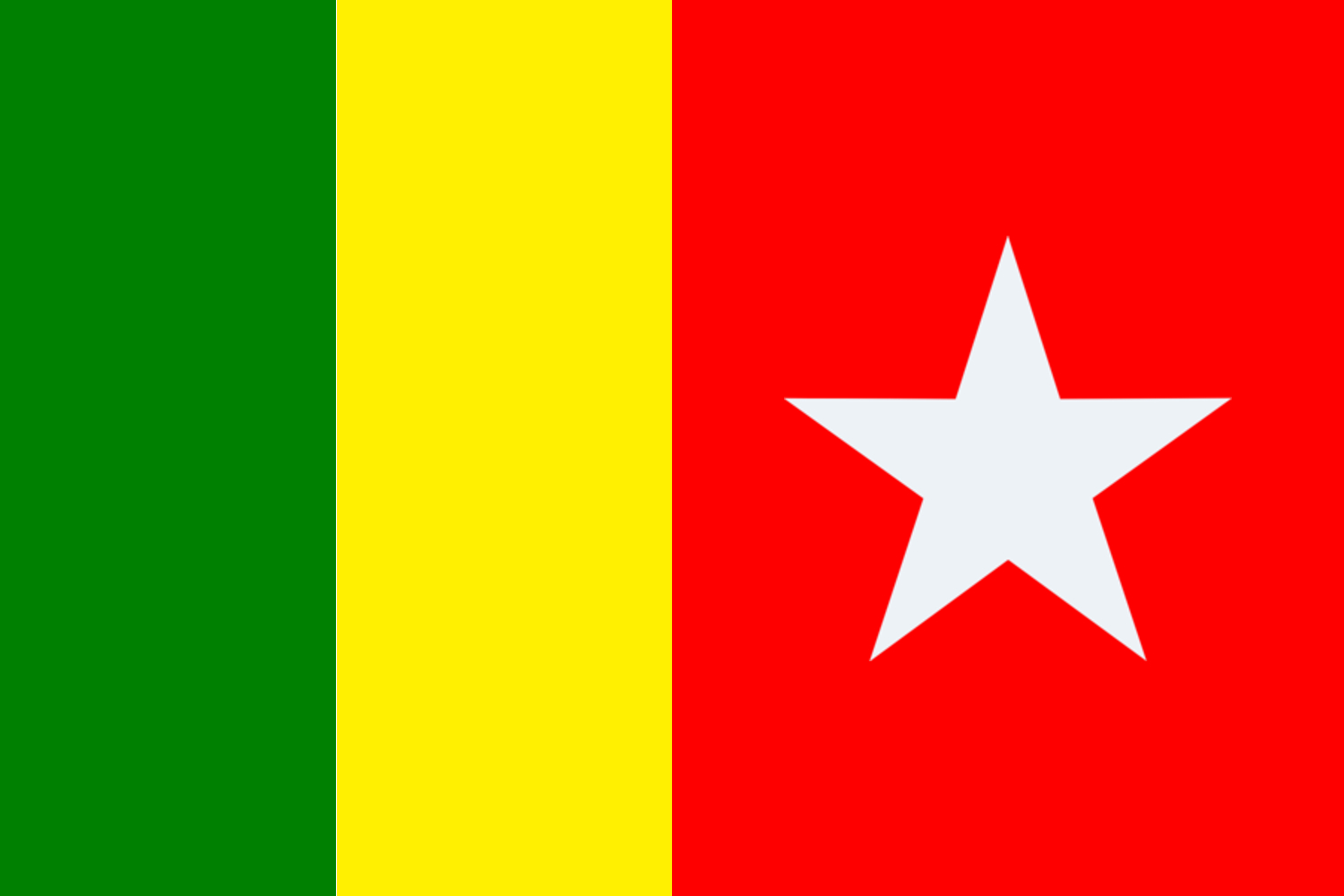

Balochistan National Party – Awami (BNP–A) is a political party in Balochistan, Pakistan with regionalist orientation. The party was founded in 1998 after an intra-party dispute within the Balochistan National Party where a group of ministers within the party, led by Israrullah Zehri, left the party after refusing to accept the results of the party's election where Ataullah Mengal had become the leader of the party. The group of ministers left the party and hence the BNP split into the Balochistan National Party (Awami), led by Zehri, and the Balochistan National Party – Mengal.

The party's president, Mir Asadullah Baloch, served as the provincial minister for agriculture of Balochistan in the coalition government headed by former chief minister Mir Abdul Qudoos Bizenjo from 2018 to 2023.

== Electoral history ==
The party did not register for the 2002 general elections despite having eligibility for contestment.

In the 2008 general elections, the party managed to secure one seat in the National Assembly, winning the NA-272 seat of Kech-Turbat. In the provincial elections, it managed to secure five seats in the Balochistan Assembly.

However, in the 2013 elections, it lost its only seat and failed to secure any seats in the National Assembly, and also failed to secure any seats in the Balochistan Assembly.

In the 2018 general elections, the party failed to secure any seats in the National Assembly. In the Balochistan Assembly, the party secured three seats.

In the 2024 general elections, the party once again failed to secure any seats in the National Assembly and only managed to secure one seat in the Balochistan Assembly.

=== National Assembly ===
Election	Results	Note
2008	1 / 272	0.21% of countrywide votes

=== Balochistan Provincial Assembly ===
Election	Results	Note
2008	5 / 50	6.0% of provincial votes
2018	3 / 65	3.79% of provincial votes
2024	1 / 65	
