= Balochistan National Party – Mengal =

Balochistan National Party – Mengal بلوچستان نيشنل پارٹی – مینگل
- Abbreviation: BNP-M
- President: Akhtar Mengal
- General Secretary: Waja Jahanzaib Baloch
- Notable members: Mir Nooruddin Mengal; Sanaullah Baloch; Abdul Wali Kakar
- Founder: Ataullah Mengal
- Founded: 1996
- Preceded by: Balochistan National Movement (Mengal)
- Student wing: Baloch Students Organization (Mengal)
- Ideology: Baloch nationalism Left-wing nationalism Democratic socialism Secularism
- Political position: Left-wing
- National affiliation: Pakistan Democratic Movement; Pakistan Oppressed Nations Movement; Tehreek Tahafuz Ayin
- International affiliation: Socialist International; Humanists International; UNPO; Progressive Alliance; Progressive International
- Colours: red, yellow, green
- National Assembly: 0 / 336
- Balochistan Assembly: 1 / 65

Election symbol
- Axe

Party flag

The Balochistan National Party – Mengal (abbr. BNP–M) (Note: Urdu: بلوچستان نيشنل پارٹی; Balūcistān Nēśanal Pārtī) is a Pakistani political party, based in Balochistan, with a leftist political position and a Baloch nationalist ideology. It favours federalism with greater autonomy and provincial rights through peaceful and democratic means. It is one of the two parties in Pakistan named Balochistan National Party, the other being Balochistan National Party – Awami (BNP–A)

== History ==
In 1972, the National Awami Party or NAP formed the first elected government in Balochistan after winning the elections and Ataullah Mengal was sworn in as the first Chief Minister of Balochistan. Nine months after the formation of the NAP Government, it was overthrown by Zulfiqar Ali Bhutto, who used Akbar Bugti's allegation that Ataullah Mengal's regime wanted to disintegrate Pakistan and liberate Balochistan as grounds for this dismissal. Mengal, Ghaus Bakhsh Bizenjo, Gul Khan Nasir, Khair Bakhsh Marri and the other NAP leaders were thrown in jail. They were released when Bhutto's government was toppled by Muhammad Zia-ul-Haq, after spending more than four years in captivity. By this time differences had arisen between the NAP leadership, so while Mengal, Bizenjo and Nasir went to the NAP headquarters, Khair Bakhsh Marri and Sher Mohammad Marri headed home.

Later, Bizenjo formed the Pakistan National Party or PNP after differences arose between him and Wali Khan over the Kabul Revolution (he supported the revolution while Wali Khan was against it). Nasir joined PNP and became the President of its Balochistan wing while Mengal went into exile in London.

In 1996, Mengal returned to Pakistan and formed the Balochistan National Party.

== BNP Government ==
BNP swept the 1997 elections and was able to form a coalition government in Balochistan with Mengal's son, Akhtar Mengal as the Chief Minister This government did not last long, as differences began arising between the Balochistan Provincial Government and the Federal Government.

== 1998–2009 ==
After the dismissal of their first government, BNP hasn't taken part in any elections. In 2002, the party didn't compete in the elections in protest of General Pervez Musharraf's October 1999 military coup which allowed the pro-military religious alliance to win almost all the moderate and nationalist constituencies. Though a few members of the party did take part in the elections independently. One of these members got elected to the National Assembly of Pakistan, one to the Senate of Pakistan and two to the Provincial Assembly i.e. Mir Akbar Mengal and Mir Akhtar Hussain Langove.

In 2006, Bugti was killed by the Pakistani Army. BNP had vehemently criticized the government when the operation in Balochistan had been launched and after Bugti's death all four of its independently elected representatives resigned from their seats of the National and Provincial Assemblies.

In December 2006, Akhtar Mengal was arrested for allegedly ordering his security guards to beat up secret service personnel. Mengal maintained that these secret service officials had tried to kidnap his children as they returned from school and as a result, the security guards had beaten them. During his trial, according to Iqbal Haider, secretary-general of the Human Rights Commission of Pakistan, "Mr Mengal was brought into the courtroom and shoved into an iron cage with bars all around that stood in a corner away from his counsel." Mengal was released in 2008, after the Pakistan Peoples Party government came in power, after spending almost one and a half year in jail.

After Akhtar Mengal's arrest, the rest of the BNP leadership was also imprisoned mainly in MPO cases. On December 2, Sajid Tareen was arrested from his chambers, Habib Jalib Baloch, Mir Akhtar Hussain Langove and Akbar Mengal were also arrested the same day. Jahanzeb Jamaldini was also put under arrest in December. Then, on January 3, 2007, the acting Chief of BNP, Mir Noor-ud-din Mengal was also arrested along with other activists while they were on their way to meet imprisoned workers of BNP in Khuzdar.

== Platform ==
The Balochistan National Party's main goal has been for the provinces having control over their resources. Under the 1973 Constitution of Pakistan, the federal government has broad powers, though the Eighteenth Amendment to the Constitution of Pakistan brought some changes.

Mengal's political trajectory has been marked by inconsistencies. Despite positioning himself as the champion of Baloch rights, his repeated alliances with governments in the center e.g. PPP in 2008, PML-N in 2013, PTI in 2018, and PDM in 2022, appear to blur his stated political principles. He joined the Federal government in 2024 before withdrawing again. Critics have also noted that despite securing small mining contracts, Mengal enjoys a comfortable lifestyle in Islamabad and Dubai.

== See also ==
- National Awami Party (Wali)
- Yaqoob Bizanjo
- Balochistan National Party – Awami
