= Balochistan Awami Party =

Pakistani political party

Balochistan Awami Party بلوچستان عوامی پارٹی پناه کتن ـشماره
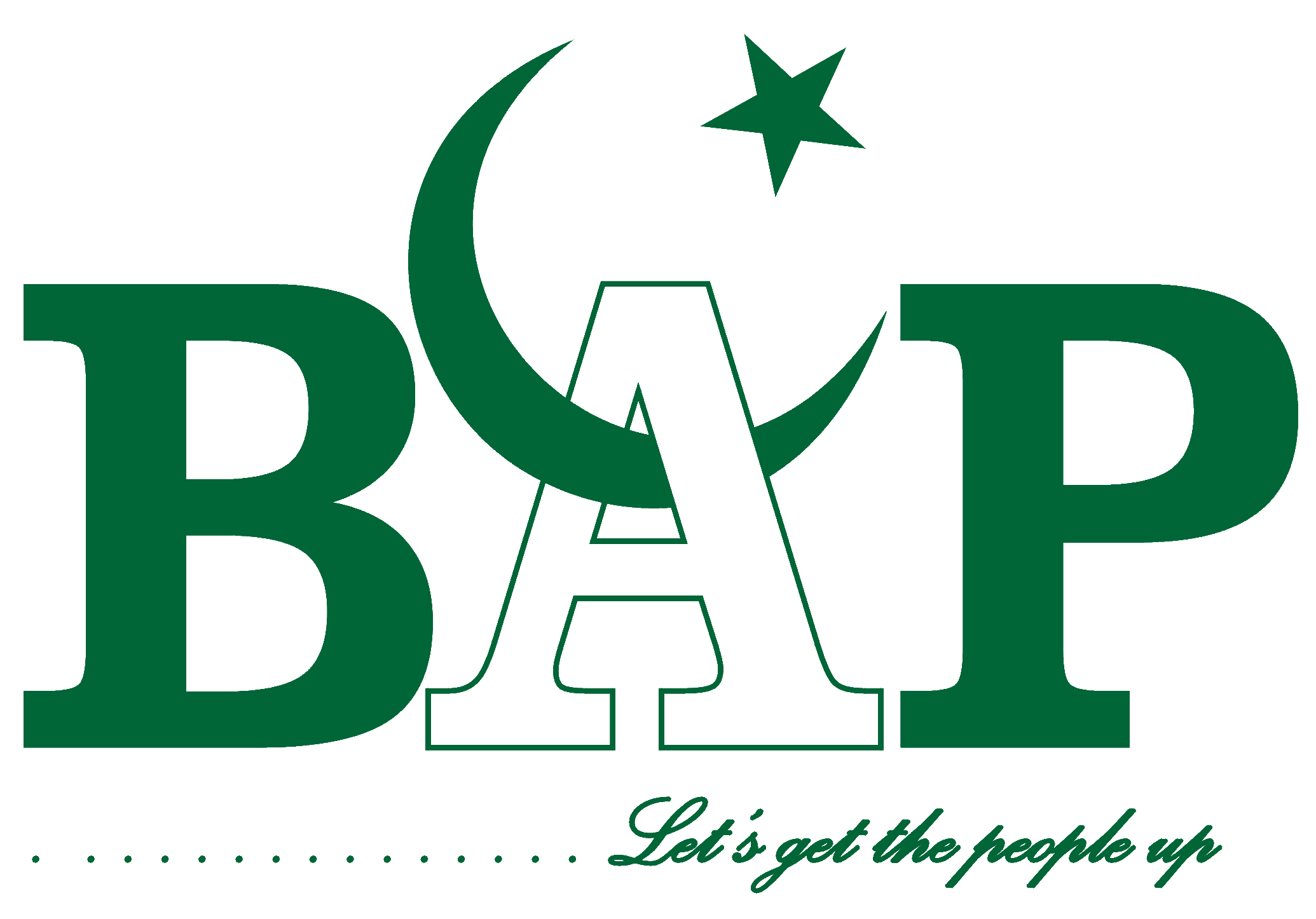
- Abbreviation: BAP
- Leader: Khalid Hussain Magsi
- Spokesperson: Khuda Babar
- Vice President: Naseebullah Bazai
- Leader in National Assembly of Pakistan: Khalid Hussain Magsi
- Founders: Saeed Ahmed Hashmi; Anwaar ul Haq Kakar
- Founded: 29 March 2018; 8 years ago
- Split from: PMLN; PML(Q)
- Ideology: Pakistani nationalism Progressivism
- Political position: Centre
- National affiliation: PDM
- Colors: Olive drab (customary)
- Slogan: "Stronger Nation, Unified People"
- Senate: 4 / 100
- National Assembly: 1 / 336
- Balochistan Assembly: 6 / 65

Election symbol
- Cow

Party flag
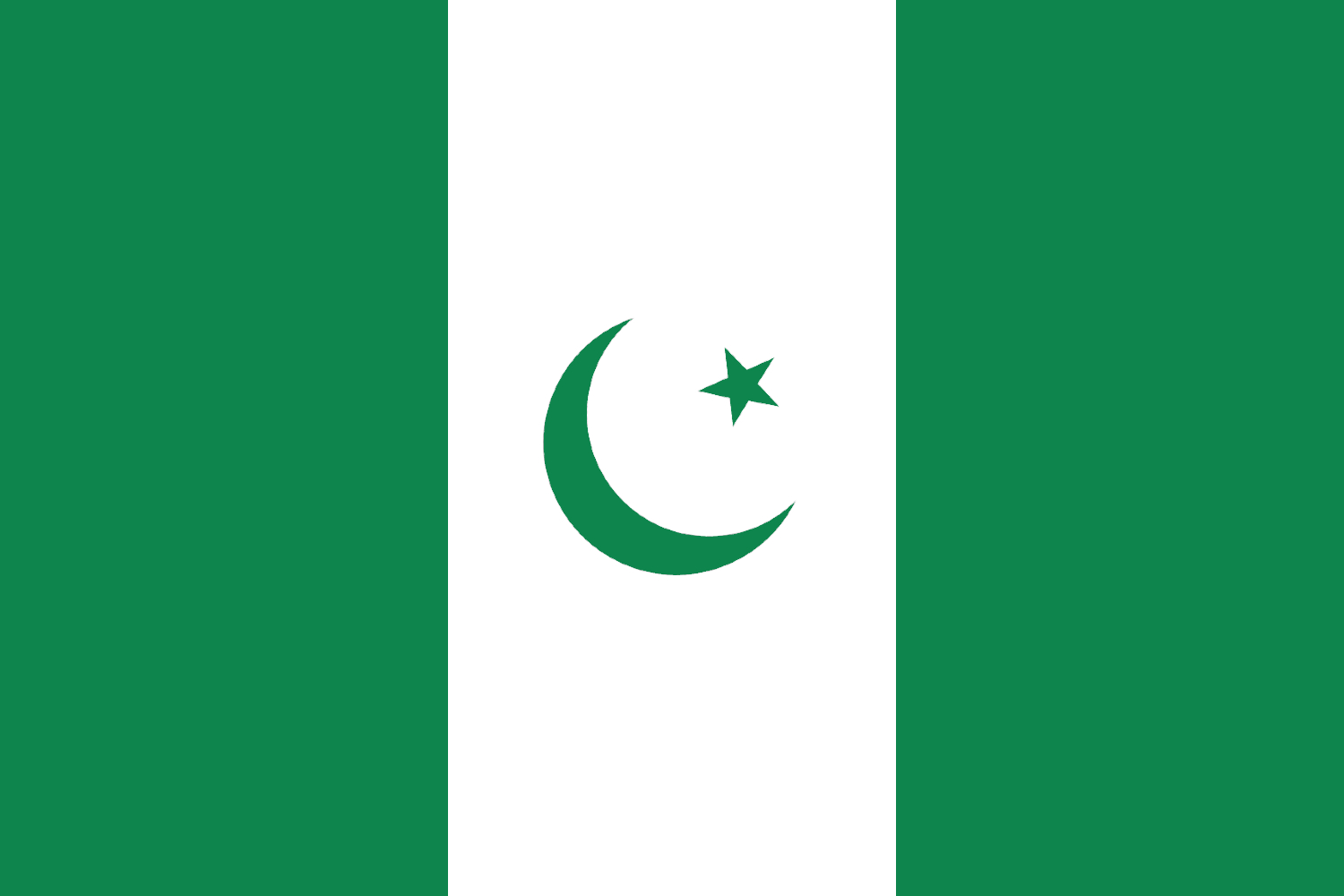

Website
- Official website

The Balochistan Awami Party (abbr. BAP) (Note: Balochi: پناه کتن ـشماره, Urdu: بلوچستان عوامی پارٹی, lit. 'Balochistan People's Party') is a Pakistani political party, based in Balochistan, with a centrist political position and a progressivist ideology. It was founded in 2018 by political dissidents of the Pakistan Muslim League (N) and the Pakistan Muslim League (Q) in Balochistan.

The party emerged as the largest party in Balochistan as a result of the 2018 Pakistani general election. It leads a coalition government in the province and is also a part of the ruling coalition in the National Assembly. It has been described as a pro-establishment party in Balochistan.

== Origins ==
On 24 December 2015, Sanaullah Zehri of the Pakistan Muslim League (N) was sworn in as the Chief Minister of Balochistan. His tenure lasted for two years, until on 2 January 2018, dissident MPAs of his own party rebelled against him and decided to support the opposition in a motion of no confidence against him. Fearing defeat, Zehri resigned as Chief Minister on 9 January 2018, and was replaced four days later by Abdul Quddus Bizenjo on 13 January. This was largely seen as a setback for the PML-N in the province.

Two months later in the Senate elections, the PML-N failed to secure a single seat in the province. Instead, independents supported by the new provincial government won six out of the 11 seats that were up for election. This was seen as another setback for the PML-N.

Furthermore, this group of senators, with the support of the provincial government, decided to launch their own candidate for the Election of Chairman in the senate. This group secured the backing of Pakistan Tehreek-e-Insaf, the Pakistan Peoples Party and many other parties which allowed them to elect their candidate Sadiq Sanjrani as Senate Chairman, securing 57 out of 103 votes.

== Foundation ==
Following these events, rumours emerged of a new political party being formed. On 29 March 2018, Saeed Ahmed Hashmi and Anwar ul Haq Kakar announced the creation of the BAP and declared that it had the support of 32 out of 65 lawmakers in the Balochistan Assembly.

On 16 May 2018, the party elected Jam Kamal Khan, former Federal Minister of State for Petroleum, as their leader.

== Elections ==
=== 2018 election ===
The party has only fielded candidates in one election since its founding: the 2018 Pakistani general election. In the election it fielded 67 candidates on all of the general seats in Balochistan, of which 19 were elected (15 PA, 4 NA).

This result allowed the party to form the provincial government in the province. As well as this, they also aided the Pakistan Tehreek-e-Insaf in forming the federal government by supporting them with their 5 MNAs.

On 28 March 2022, the party announced that they will support opposition parties in the no-confidence motion against PM Imran Khan.

== Electoral performance ==
=== Senate of Pakistan ===
Election	Leader	Seats		Position	Resulting government
Election	Leader	#	±	Position	Resulting government
2018	Sadiq Sanjrani	10 / 104	▲ -	5th	Opposition coalition
2021	Jam Kamal Khan	13 / 100	▲3	4th	PTI coalition

=== National Assembly ===
Election	Leader	Votes		Seats		Position	Resulting government
Election	Leader	#	%	#	±	Position	Resulting government
2018	Jam Kamal Khan	319,348	0.60	5 / 342	▲5	5th	PTI coalition

=== Balochistan Assembly ===
Election	Leader	Votes		Seats		Position	Resulting government
Election	Leader	#	%	#	±	Position	Resulting government
2018	Jam Kamal Khan	446,795	24.59	24 / 65	▲24	1st	BAP coalition
