= Provincial Assembly of Balochistan =

Unicameral legislature of Balochistan, Pakistan

Provincial Assembly of Balochistan صوبائی اسمبلی بلوچستان (Urdu) مجلس سوبائی بلۏچستان (Balochi)
- List of members of the 12th Provincial Assembly of Balochistan

Type
- Type: Unicameral

Leadership
- Speaker: Abdul Khaliq Khan Achakzai, PMLN since 29 February 2024
- Deputy Speaker: Ghazala Gola, PPP since 29 February 2024
- Chief Minister: Sarfraz Bugti, PPP since 2 March 2024
- Leader of Opposition: Mir Younus Aziz Zehri, JUI (F)

Structure
- Seats: 65
- Political groups: Government (46): PPP (18); PMLN (18); BAP (5); ANP (3); JIP (1); Independent (1); Opposition (19): JUI (F) (12); NP (4); BNP(M) (1); BNP-A (1); HDTB (1)

Elections
- Voting system: Mixed-member majoritarian: 51 members elected by FPTP; 11 seats for women, 3 seats for non-Muslims by PR
- Last election: 8 February 2024
- Next election: 2029

Meeting place
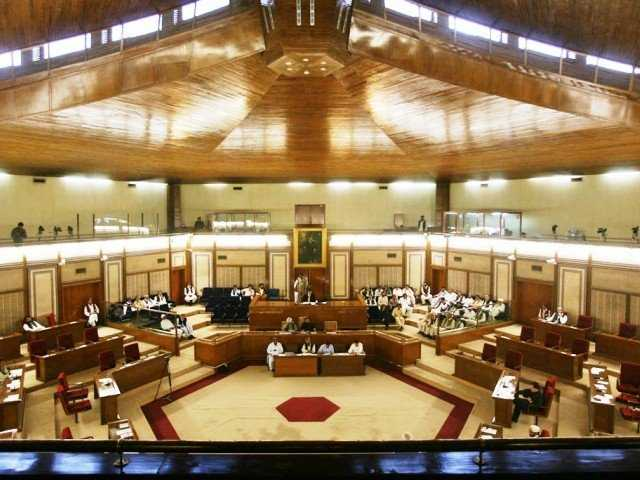
- Assembly House, Quetta

Website
- pabalochistan.gov.pk

Constitution
- Constitution of the Islamic Republic of Pakistan

The Provincial Assembly of Balochistan (Note: Urdu: صوبائی اسمبلی بلوچستان, Balochi: مجلس سوبائی بلۏچستان, Pashto: د بلوچستان ولایتي شورا) is a unicameral legislature of elected representatives of the Pakistani province of Balochistan, and is located in Quetta, the provincial capital. It was established under Article 106 of the Constitution of Pakistan having a total of 65 seats, with 51 general seats, 11 seats reserved for women and 3 reserved for non-Muslims. The Assembly has 51 directly elected Members of the Provincial Assembly, representing constituencies from each district, as well as 11 seats reserved for women and 3 for non-Muslims.

== List of speakers ==
Name of Speaker	Entered Office	Left Office	Political Party
Nawab Muhammad Khan Barozai	02-05-1972	06-12-1976	NAP
Al-Haj Mir Jam Ghulam Qadir Khan	06-12-1976	05-07-1977	NAP
Muhammad Sarwar Khan Kakar	06-04-1985	02-12-1988	IND
Nawab Muhammad Khan Barozai	02-12-1988	04-02-1989	PPP
Mehr Muhammad Akram Baloch	05-02-1989	24-04-1990	BNA
Mir Zahoor Hussain Khan Khosa	31-05-1990	17-11-1990	BNA
Malik Sikandar Khan	17-11-1990	19-10-1993	JUI-F
Abdul Waheed Baloch	19-10-1993	21-02-1997	BNM
Mir Abdul Jabbar Khan	21-02-1997	12-10-1999	JWP
Jamal Shah Kakar	29-11-2002	08-04-2008	MMA
Aslam Bhutani	08-04-2008	26-12-2012	PML
Syed Matiullah Agha	31-12-2012	04-06-2013	MMA
Jan Mohammad Jamali	04-06-2013	22-05-2015	PMLN
Rahila Durrani	24-12-2015	16-08-2018	PMLN
Abdul Quddus Bizenjo	16-08-2018	25-10-2021	BAP
Jan Mohammad Jamali	30-10-2021	28-02-2024	BAP
Abdul Khaliq Khan Achakzai	29-02-2024	present	PMLN

== List of Assemblies of Balochistan ==
No.	Name	Term start	Term end
1	1st Provincial Assembly of the Balochistan	1972	1976
2	2nd Provincial Assembly of the Balochistan	1976	1977
3	3rd Provincial Assembly of the Balochistan	1985	1988
4	4th Provincial Assembly of the Balochistan	1988	1990
5	5th Provincial Assembly of the Balochistan	1990	1993
6	6th Provincial Assembly of the Balochistan	1993	1996
7	7th Provincial Assembly of the Balochistan	1997	1999
8	8th Provincial Assembly of the Balochistan	2002	2007
9	9th Provincial Assembly of the Balochistan	2008	2013
10	10th Provincial Assembly of the Balochistan	2013	2018
11	11th Provincial Assembly of the Balochistan	2018	2023
12	12th Provincial Assembly of the Balochistan	2024	present
