= List of members of the 12th Provincial Assembly of Balochistan =

The List of Members of the 12th Provincial Assembly of Balochistan is a comprehensive record of the elected representatives who constitute the 12th Provincial Assembly of Balochistan. The first meeting of this assembly was convened on 28 February 2024. The members, often referred to as MPAs, were sworn in at a ceremony held in Quetta. The assembly includes representatives from various political parties including Pakistan People's Party (PPP), Pakistan Muslim League (N) (PMLN), Jamiat Ulema-e-Islam (F), and Balochistan Awami Party (BAP).

== Elected members ==
Constituency		Member		Note	Ref
No.	Name	Party	Name of Member	Note	Ref
PB-1	Sherani-Cum-Zhob	JUI(F)	Nawaz Kibzai		
PB-2	Zhob	JUI(F)	Fazal Qadir Mandokhail		
PB-3	Killa Saifullah	PPP	Maulana Noorullah		
PB-4	Musakhel-cum-Barkhan	PML(N)	Abdul Rehman Khetran		
PB-5	Loralai	BAP	Muhammad Khan Toor Utmankhel		
PB-6	Duki	PML(N)	Sardar Masood Ali Khan Luni		
PB-7	Ziarat cum Harnai	PML(N)	Noor Muhammad Dummar		
PB-8	Sibi	PPP	Mir Kohyar Khan Domki		
PB-9	Kohlu	PML(N)	Changez Khan Marri		
PB-10	Dera Bugti	PPP	Sarfraz Bugti		
PB-11	Jhal Magsi	BAP	Nawabzada Tariq Magsi		
PB-12	Kachhi	PML(N)	Mir Mohammad Asim Kurd Gello		
PB-13	Nasirabad-I	PPP	Mir Muhammad Sadiq Umrani		
PB-14	Nasirabad-II	PML(N)	Muhammad Khan Lehri		
PB-15	Sohbatpur	PML(N)	Mir Saleem Ahmed Khoso		
PB-16	Jafarabad	JIP	Abdul Majeed Badini		
PB-17	Usta Muhammad	PPP	Faisal Khan Jamali		
PB-18	Khuzdar-I	PPP	Sanaullah Khan Zehri		
PB-19	Khuzdar-II	JUI(F)	Mir Younus Aziz Zehri		
PB-20	Khuzdar-III	BNP(M)	Mir Jahanzaib Mengal		
PB-21	Hub	BAP	Mohammad Saleh Bhootani		
PB-22	Lasbela	PML(N)	Nawabzada Mir Muhammad Zarain Khan Magsi		
PB-23	Awaran	NP	Khair Jan Baloch		
PB-24	Gwadar	HDT	Hidayat ur Rehman Baloch		
PB-25	Kech-I	PPP	Zahoor Ahmed Buledi		
PB-26	Kech-II	NP	Abdul Malik Baloch		
PB-27	Kech-III	PML(N)	Barkat Ali Rind		
PB-28	Kech-IV	PPP	Mir Asghar Rind		
PB-29	Panjgur-I	BNP(A)	Mir Asadullah Baloch		
PB-30	Panjgur-II	NP	Rahmat Saleh Baloch		
PB-31	Washuk	JUI(F)	Mir Zabid Ali Reki		
PB-32	Chagai	BAP	Sadiq Sanjrani		
PB-33	Kharan	PML(N)	Mir Shoaib Nosherwani		
PB-34	Nushki	JUI(F)	Haji Ghulam Dastagir Badeni		
PB-35	Surab	JUI(F)	Mir Zafarullah Khan Zehri		
PB-36	Kalat	BAP	Mir Ziaullah Langau		
PB-37	Mastung	JUI(F)	Aslam Raisani		
PB-38	Quetta-I	ANP	Malik Naeem Khan Bazai		
PB-39	Quetta-II	PML(N)	Bakht Muhammad Kakar		
PB-40	Quetta-III	PPP	Samad Khan Gorgage		
PB-41	Quetta-IV	PML(N)	Wali Muhammad Noorzai		
PB-42	Quetta-V	PML(N)	Sheikh Zarak Khan Mandokhail		
PB-43	Quetta-VI	PPP	Mir Liaquat Ali Lehri		
PB-44	Quetta-VII	PPP	Mir Ubaidullah Gorgage		
PB-45	Quetta-VIII	PPP	Ali Madad Jattak		
PB-46	Quetta-IX	BAP	Prince Ahmed Umer Ahmedzai		
PB-47	Pishin-I	PPP	Asfand Yar Khan Kakar		
PB-48	Pishin-II	JUI(F)	Asghar Ali Tareen		
PB-49	Pishin-II	JUI(F)	Syed Zafar Ali Agha		
PB-50	Killa Abdullah	ANP	Zmarak Khan Achakzai		
PB-51	Chaman	PML(N)	Abdul Khaliq Khan Achakzai		
Reserved	Women	PPP	Ghazala Gola		
Reserved	Women	PPP	Meena Majeed		
Reserved	Women	PPP	Shehnaz Umrani		
Reserved	Women	PML(N)	Rahila Durrani		
Reserved	Women	PML(N)	Hadiya Nawaz		
Reserved	Women	PML(N)	Rubaba Khan Buledi		
Reserved	Women	JUI(F)	Shahida Rauf		
Reserved	Women	JUI(F)	Safia Fazlur Rehman		
Reserved	Women	BAP	Farah Azeem Shah		
Reserved	Women	NP	Umm Kulsoom		
Reserved	Women	ANP	Salma Bibi		
Reserved	Minorities	PPP	Sanjay Kumar		
Reserved	Minorities	PML(N)	Ashok Kumar		
Reserved	Minorities	JUI(F)	Ravi Pahuja		
