= NA-263 Quetta-II =

Constituency of the National Assembly of Pakistan

- Constituency for the National Assembly of Pakistan
- Region: Quetta City (partly) of Quetta District
- Electorate: 321,117

Current constituency
- Party: Pakistan Muslim League (N)
- Member: Jamal Shah Kakar
- Created from: NA-265 Quetta-II

NA-263 Quetta-II (این اے-۲۶۳، کوئٹہ۲) is a constituency for the National Assembly of Pakistan.

== Assembly Segments ==
Constituency number	Constituency	District	Current MPA	Party
43	PB-43 Quetta-VI	Quetta	Mir Liaquat Ali Lehri	PPP
44	PB-44 Quetta-VII	Quetta	Mir Ubaidullah Gorgage	PPP
45	PB-45 Quetta-VIII	Quetta	Ali Madad Jattak	PPP

== Members of Parliament ==
=== 2018–2023: NA-265 Quetta-II ===
Election	Member	Party
2018	Qasim Suri	PTI

=== 2024–present: NA-263 Quetta-II ===
Election	Member	Party
2024	Jamal Shah Kakar	PML(N)

== Election 2002 ==
General elections were held on 10 October 2002. Maulvi Noor Muhammad of Muttahida Majlis-e-Amal won by 22,111 votes.

General election 2002: NA-259 Quetta
Party	Candidate	Votes	%	±%
MMA	Noor Muhammad	22,111	29.96	
PMAP	Mahmood Khan Achakzai	17,240	23.36	
PML(Q)	Syed Muhammad Fazal Agha	9,871	13.37	
Balochistan National Democratic Party	Saadat Ali Hazara	8,973	12.16	
PPP	Mian Saifullah Paracha	6,675	9.04	
PML(N)	Muhammad Ayaz Khan Swati	3,134	4.25	
NA	Taj Muhammad Jamali	1,238	1.68	
Others	Others (eleven candidates)	4,568	6.18	
Turnout		75,501	24.28	
Total valid votes		73,810	97.76	
Rejected ballots		1,691	2.24	
Majority		4,871	6.60	
Registered electors		310,948		

== Election 2008 ==
General elections were held on 18 February 2008. Syed Nasir Ali Shah of PPP won by 24,936 votes.

General election 2008: NA-259 Quetta
Party	Candidate	Votes	%	±%
PPP	Syed Nasir Ali Shah Alias Syed Abbas	24,936	41.00	
PML(Q)	Anwar UI Haq Alias Anno	11,387	18.72	
Independent	Fazal Muhammad	6,661	10.95	
PML(N)	Khudai Noor	6,617	10.88	
MMA	Abdul Aziz Khan Khilji	4,412	7.26	
ANP	Khudai Dad	1,459	2.40	
Independent	Abdul Qadir Baloch	1,150	1.89	
Others	Others (eleven candidates)	4,195	6.90	
Turnout		62,692	17.15	
Total valid votes		60,817	97.01	
Rejected ballots		1,875	2.99	
Majority		13,549	22.28	
Registered electors		365,579		
PPP gain from MMA				

== Election 2013 ==
General elections were held on 11 May 2013. Mehmood Khan Achakzai of Pakhtun-khwa Milli Awami Party won by 38,552 votes and became the member of National Assembly.

General election 2013: NA-259 Quetta
Party	Candidate	Votes	%	±%
PMAP	Mahmood Khan Achakzai	38,552	35.72	
PTI	Qasim Suri	16,007	14.83	
MDM	Abdul Kabeer Shahkir	13,512	12.52	
PML(Q)	Ruquiya Saeed Hashmi	9,965	9.23	
JUI (F)	Hamdullah	7,622	7.06	
HDP	Abdul Khaliq Hazara	5,781	5.36	
PPP	Mir Maqbool Ahmed Lehri	4,737	4.39	
JUINP	Mehmood Ul Hassan Qasmi	3,298	3.06	
Others	Others (twenty six candidates)	8,452	7.83	
Turnout		110,056	41.64	
Total valid votes		107,926	98.06	
Rejected ballots		2,130	1.94	
Majority		22,545	20.89	
Registered electors		264,293		
PMAP gain from PPP				

== Election 2018 ==
General elections were held on 25 July 2018.

General election 2018: NA-265 Quetta-II
Party	Candidate	Votes	%	±%
PTI	Qasim Suri	25,117	32.64	
BNP (M)	Mir Lashkari Raisani	20,389	17.77	
PMAP	Mahmood Khan Achakzai	11,487	10.01	
MMA	Hamadullah Saboor	10,124	8.82	
PML(N)	Raheela Hameed Khan Durrani	10,931	8.66	
ANP	Nawabzada Omar Farooque	7,297	6.36	
PPP	Rozi Khan Kakar	5,878	5.12	
MWM	Syed Muhammad Raza	5,004	4.36	
BAP	Naseebullah Achakzai	4,279	3.73	
Independent	Ghulam Ali Naushad	2,738	2.39	
Independent	Liaquat Ali Lehrri	2,638	2.30	
Independent	Maasoom Khan	2,535	2.21	
HDP	Abdul Khaliq Hazara	2,052	1.79	
PRHP	Wali Khan	1,863	1.62	
Others	Others (eleven candidates)	2,543	2.22	
Turnout		118,153	36.79	
Total valid votes		114,731	97.10	
Rejected ballots		3,422	2.90	
Majority		5,584	4.87	
Registered electors		321,117		
PTI gain from PMAP				

== Election 2024 ==
General elections were held on 8 February 2024. Jamal Shah Kakar won the election with 27,175 votes.

General election 2024: NA-263 Quetta-II
Party	Candidate	Votes	%	±%
PML(N)	Jamal Shah Kakar	27,175	23.48	▲14.82
PTI	Salar Khan Kakar (Note: Filed nomination papers as PTI candidate but ECP allowed him to run as an Independent)	25,372	21.91	▼0.73
PMAP	Mahmood Khan Achakzai	15,304	13.22	▲3.21
PPP	Rozi Khan Kakar	9,076	7.84	▲2.72
Independent	Lashkari Raisani	8,562	7.40	
PNAP	Nasrullah Zayrai	7,650	6.61	N/A
HDP	Mirza Hussain	6,395	5.53	▲3.74
BNP (M)	Maqbool Ahmed Lehri	5,185	4.48	▼13.29
Others	Others (thirty four candidates)	11,007	9.51	
Turnout		118,573	28.35	▼8.44
Total valid votes		115,726	97.60	
Rejected ballots		2,847	2.40	
Majority		1,803	1.56	
Registered electors		418,280		
PML(N) gain from PTI				

== See also ==
- NA-262 Quetta-I
- NA-264 Quetta-III
