= NA-252 Musakhel-cum-Barkhan-cum-Loralai-cum-Duki =

Constituency of the National Assembly of Pakistan

- Constituency for the National Assembly of Pakistan
- Region: Loralai Division
- Electorate: 339,816

Current constituency
- Created: 2018
- Party: Pakistan Muslim League (N)
- Member: Sardar Yaqoob Nasar
- Created from: NA-257 (Killa Saifullah-cum-Zhob-cum-Sherani); NA-258 (Loralai-cum-Musakhel-cum-Ziarat-cum-Duki-cum-Harnai); NA-259 (Dera Bugti-cum-Kohlu-cum-Barkhan-cum-Sibbi-cum-Lehri)

NA-252 Musakhel-cum-Barkhan-cum-Loralai-cum-Duki (این اے-252، موسیٰ خیل-کم-بارکھان-کم-لورالائی-کم-ڈُکی) is a newly created constituency for the National Assembly of Pakistan. It comprises the districts of Loralai, Musakhel, Ziarat, Duki and Harnai from the province of Balochistan.

== Assembly Segments ==
Constituency number	Constituency	District	Current MPA	Party
4	PB-4 Musakhel-cum-Barkhan	Musakhel	Abdul Rehman Khetran	PML(N)
4	PB-4 Musakhel-cum-Barkhan	Barkhan	Abdul Rehman Khetran	PML(N)
5	PB-5 Loralai	Loralai	Muhammad Khan Toor Utmankhel	PML(N)
6	PB-6 Duki	Duki	Masood Ali Khan	PML(N)

== Members of Parliament ==
=== 2018–2022: NA-258 Loralai-cum-Musakhel-cum-Ziarat-cum-Duki-cum-Harnai ===
Election	Member	Party
2018	Muhammad Israr Tareen	BAP

== Election 2018 ==
General elections were held on 25 July 2018.

General election 2018: NA-258 Loralai-cum-Musa Khail-cum-Ziarat-cum-Duki-cum-Harnai
Party	Candidate	Votes	%	±%
BAP	Muhammad Israr Tareen	42,938	27.08	
MMA	Ameer Zaman	38,457	24.25	
PML(N)	Sardar Yaqoob Nasar	25,792	16.26	
PMAP	Habibur Rehman	22,596	14.25	
PTI	Syed Qurban Ali Gharsheen	16,738	10.55	
Others	Others (fourteen candidates)	12,062	7.61	
Turnout		165,356	52.68	
Total valid votes		158,583	95.90	
Rejected ballots		6,773	4.10	
Majority		4,481	2.83	
Registered electors		313,891		
BAP win (new seat)				

== Election 2024 ==
General elections were held on 8 February 2024. Sardar Yaqoob Nasar won the election with 55,003 votes.

General election 2024: NA-252 Musakhel-cum-Barkhan-cum-Loralai-cum-Duki
Party	Candidate	Votes	%	±%
PML(N)	Sardar Yaqoob Nasar	55,003	28.45	▲12.19
PTI	Sardar Babar Khan Musakhel (Note: Filed nomination papers as PTI candidate but ECP allowed him to run as an Independent)	53,125	27.48	▲16.93
Independent	Jahanzaib Khan Khetran	23,001	11.90	N/A
JUI (F)	Amanullah Khan	19,643	10.16	N/A
Independent	Mir Baz Muhammad Khan Khetran	11,402	5.90	N/A
PMAP	Sardar Taimoor Shah	6,342	3.28	▼10.97
PPP	Muhammad Israr Tareen	5,961	3.08	▲1.46
Others	Others (twenty eight candidates)	18,857	9.75	
Turnout		195,018	57.39	▲4.71
Total valid votes		193,334	99.14	
Rejected ballots		1,684	0.86	
Majority		1,878	0.97	
Registered electors		339,816		
PML(N) gain from PTI				

== See also ==
- NA-251 Sherani-cum-Zhob-cum-Killa Saifullah
- NA-253 Ziarat-cum-Harnai-cum-Sibbi-cum-Kohlu-cum-Dera Bugti
