= NA-259 Kech-cum-Gwadar =

Constituency of the National Assembly of Pakistan

- Constituency for the National Assembly of Pakistan
- Region: Kech District (Partly) Gwadar District
- Electorate: 222,631

Current constituency
- Created: 2022
- Party: Pakistan People's Party
- Member: Malik Shah Gorgaij
- Created from: NA-271 (Kech) and NA-272 (Lasbela-cum-Gwadar)

NA-259 Kech-cum-Gwadar (این اے-259، کیچ-کم-گوادر)is a constituency for the National Assembly of Pakistan. It covers southern parts of the district of Kech and whole District Gwadar in the province of Balochistan. The constituency was created in 2022 out of NA-272 (Kech-cum-Gwadar) by taking out Kech District and making it a separate constituency.

== Assembly Segments ==
Constituency number	Constituency	District	Current MPA	Party
24	PB-24 Gwadar	Gwadar	Hidayat ur Rehman Baloch	HDTB
25	PB-25 Kech-I	Kech	Zahoor Ahmed Buledi	PPP
26	PB-26 Kech-II	Kech	Abdul Malik Baloch	NP

== Members of Parliament ==
=== 2018–2023: NA-271 Kech ===
Election	Member	Party
2018	Zubaida Jalal Khan	BAP

=== 2024–present: NA-259 Kech-cum-Gwadar ===
Election	Member	Party
2024	Malik Shah Gorgaij	PPP

== Election 2002 ==
General election 2002: NA-272 Kech-cum-Gwadar
Party	Candidate	Votes	%	±%
Independent	Zubada Jalal	44,177	49.63	
BNM	Dr. Abdul Malik	36,169	40.64	
MMA	Abdul Haque	6,252	7.02	
Others	Others (two candidates)	2,410	2.71	
Turnout		92,043	32.67	
Total valid votes		89,008	96.70	
Rejected ballots		3,035	3.30	
Majority		8,008	8.99	
Registered electors		281,748		

== Election 2008 ==
General election 2008: NA-272 Kech-cum-Gwadar
Party	Candidate	Votes	%	±%
BNP (A)	Yaqoob Bizenjo	61,655	59.32	
Independent	Zubada Jalal	33,564	32.29	
PPP	Dr. Muhammad Haider Baloch	3,514	3.38	
PML(N)	Abdul Qadeer	2,448	2.36	
Others	Others (two candidates)	2,757	2.65	
Turnout		107,930	34.07	
Total valid votes		103,938	96.30	
Rejected ballots		3,992	3.70	
Majority		28,091	27.03	
Registered electors		316,766		

== Election 2013 ==
General election 2013: NA-272 Kech-cum-Gwadar
Party	Candidate	Votes	%	±%
BNP (M)	Syed Essa Nori	15,835	37.81	
NP	Muhammad Yasin Baloch	15,316	36.57	
BNP (A)	Abdul Rauf Rind	5,147	12.29	
JUI (F)	Abdul Hameed	2,973	7.10	
JI	Gulab Baloch	1,108	2.65	
Others	Others (six candidates)	1,502	3.58	
Turnout		43,025	16.07	
Total valid votes		41,881	97.34	
Rejected ballots		1,144	2.66	
Majority		519	1.24	
Registered electors		267,667		

== Election 2018 ==
General elections were held on 25 July 2018.

General election 2018: NA-271 Kech
Party	Candidate	Votes	%	±%
BAP	Zubaida Jalal	33,456	38.81	
BNP (A)	Syed Ehsan Shah	20,617	23.92	
BNP (M)	Jan Muhammad Dashti	12,277	14.24	
NP	Abul Hassan	9,951	11.54	
Independent	Hotman	5,306	6.16	
Others	Others (ten candidates)	4,589	5.33	
Turnout		88,865	39.92	
Total valid votes		86,196	97.00	
Rejected ballots		2,669	3.00	
Majority		12,839	14.89	
Registered electors		222,631		
BAP gain from BNP (M)				

== Election 2024 ==
General elections were held on 8 February 2024. Malik Shah Gorgaij won the election with 40,778 votes.

General election 2024: NA-259 Kech-cum-Gwadar
Party	Candidate	Votes	%	±%
PPP	Malik Shah Gorgaij	40,778	35.90	▲35.52
NP	Abdul Malik Baloch	22,313	19.65	▲8.11
HDTB	Hussain Baloch	21,352	18.80	N/A
Independent	Yaqoob Bizanjo	20,613	18.15	N/A
BNP (M)	Syed Ehsan Shah	5,493	4.84	▼9.40
Others	Others (fourteen candidates)	3,028	2.67	
Turnout		116,140	38.20	▼1.72
Total valid votes		113,577	97.79	
Rejected ballots		2,563	2.21	
Majority		18,465	16.26	
Registered electors		304,040		
PPP gain from HDTB				

== See also ==
- NA-258 Panjgur-cum-Kech
- NA-260 Chagai-cum-Nushki-cum-Kharan-cum-Washuk
