= NA-261 Surab-cum-Kalat-cum-Mastung =

Constituency of the National Assembly of Pakistan

- Constituency for the National Assembly of Pakistan
- Region: Kalat District, Surab District, Mastung District
- Electorate: 239,161

Current constituency
- Party: Jamiat Ulema-e-Islam (F)
- Member: Abdul Ghafoor Haideri
- Created from: NA-267 Mastung-cum-Shaheed Sikandarabad-cum-Kalat

NA-261 Surab-cum-Kalat-cum-Mastung (این اے-261، سوراب-کم-قلات-کم-مستونگ) is a constituency for the National Assembly of Pakistan.

== Assembly Segments ==
Constituency number	Constituency	District	Current MPA	Party
35	PB-35 Surab	Surab	Mir Zafarullah Khan Zehri	JUI(F)
36	PB-36 Kalat	Kalat	Mir Ziaullah Langau	BAP
37	PB-37 Mastung	Mastung	Nawab Aslam Raisani	JUI(F)

== Members of Parliament ==
=== 2018–2022: NA-267 Mastung-cum-Shaheed Sikandarabad-cum-Kalat ===
Election	Member	Party
2018	Syed Mehmood Shah	MMA

=== 2023–present: NA-268 Surab-cum-Kalat-cum-Mastung ===
Election	Member	Party
2024	Abdul Ghafoor Haideri	JUI(F)

== Election 2002 ==
General elections were held on 10 October 2002. Maulana Abdul Ghafoor Haidri of Muttahida Majlis-e-Amal won by 21,559 votes.

General election 2002: NA-268 Kalat-cum-Mastung
Party	Candidate	Votes	%	±%
MMA	Abdul Ghafoor Haideri	21,559	42.72	
NA	Mir Kamal Khan Bangalzai	14,638	29.01	
BNP (M)	Mir Munir Ahmed Shahwani	11,157	22.11	
Others	Others (two candidates)	3,112	6.16	
Turnout		52,092	23.78	
Total valid votes		50,466	96.88	
Rejected ballots		1,626	3.12	
Majority		6,921	13.71	
Registered electors		219,071		

== Election 2008 ==
General elections were held on 18 February 2008. Ayatullah Durrani of PPP won by 19,355 votes.

General election 2008: NA-268 Kalat-cum-Mastung
Party	Candidate	Votes	%	±%
PPP	Dr. Ayatullah Durrani	19,355	30.80	
NP	Sardar Sanaullah Zehri	15,846	25.22	
MMA	Abdul Ghafoor Haideri	9,546	15.19	
Independent	Faisal Daud	8,766	13.95	
Independent	Noor Muhammad	4,233	6.74	
Independent	Mir Munir Ahmed Shahwani	3,784	6.02	
Others	Others (five candidates)	1,303	2.08	
Turnout		65,515	31.07	
Total valid votes		62,833	95.91	
Rejected ballots		2,682	4.09	
Majority		3,509	5.58	
Registered electors		210,875		
PPP gain from MMA				

== Election 2013 ==
General elections were held on 11 May 2013. Sardar Kamal Khan Bangulzai of National Party won by 19,873 votes and became the member of National Assembly.

General election 2013: NA-268 Kalat-cum-Mastung
Party	Candidate	Votes	%	±%
NP	Sardar Kamal Khan Bangulzai	19,873	32.14	
JUI (F)	Abdul Ghafoor Haideri	10,717	17.33	
BNP (M)	Malik Naveed Dehwar	8,782	14.20	
JUINP	Sardarzada Mir Saeed Ahmed	7,918	12.81	
PML(N)	Sardar Sanaullah Zehri	6,724	10.88	
Independent	Muhammad Iqbal	2,733	4.42	
BNP (A)	Mir Ali Akbar	2,580	4.17	
Others	Others (eleven candidates)	2,499	4.05	
Turnout		64,023	34.81	
Total valid votes		61,826	96.57	
Rejected ballots		2,197	3.43	
Majority		9,156	14.81	
Registered electors		183,932		
NP gain from PPP				

== Election 2018 ==
General elections were held on 25 July 2018.

General election 2018: NA-267 Mastung-cum-Shaheed Sikandarabad-cum-Kalat
Party	Candidate	Votes	%	±%
MMA	Syed Mehmood Shah	26,645	24.04	
BNP (M)	Manzoor Ahmed Baloch	25,738	23.22	
BAP	Sardar Noor Ahmed	20,322	18.33	
NP	Nawab Muhammad Khan Shahwani	7,791	7.03	
PML(N)	Sanaullah Khan Zehri	7,132	6.43	
Independent	Mir Manzoor Hussain	6,167	5.56	
PTI	Mir Taj Muhammad	3,557	3.21	
AAT	Mir Ahmed	3,013	2.72	
BNP (A)	Mir Ali Akbar	2,493	2.25	
PPP	Ayatullah Durrani	1,551	1.40	
Independent	Mir Munir Ahmed Shahwani	1,535	1.38	
BNM	Muhammad Iqbal	1,131	1.03	
Others	Others (nine candidates)	3,765	3.40	
Turnout		116,372	48.66	
Total valid votes		110,840	95.25	
Rejected ballots		5,532	4.75	
Majority		907	0.82	
Registered electors		239,161		
MMA gain from NP				

== Election 2024 ==
General elections were held on 8 February 2024. Abdul Ghafoor Haideri won the election with 31,713 votes.

General election 2024: NA-261 Surab-cum-Kalat-cum-Mastung
Party	Candidate	Votes	%	±%
JUI (F)	Abdul Ghafoor Haideri	31,713	27.89	N/A
BNP (M)	Akhtar Mengal	27,465	24.15	▲0.93
PPP	Sanaullah Khan Zehri	24,269	21.34	▲19.94
NP	Mir Kabir Ahmed	11,951	10.51	▲3.48
BAP	Bahi Khan	7,047	6.20	▼12.13
Others	Others (twenty two candidates)	11,267	9.91	
Turnout		119,928	39.05	▼9.61
Total valid votes		113,712	94.82	
Rejected ballots		6,216	5.18	
Majority		4,248	3.74	▲2.92
Registered electors		307,143		
JUI (F) hold				

== See also ==
- NA-260 Chagai-cum-Nushki-cum-Kharan-cum-Washuk
- NA-262 Quetta-I
