= NA-266 Killa Abdullah-cum-Chaman =

Constituency of the National Assembly of Pakistan

- Constituency for the National Assembly of Pakistan
- Region: Killa Abdullah District and Chaman District
- Electorate: 357,834

Current constituency
- Party: Pashtunkhwa Milli Awami Party
- Member: Mahmood Khan Achakzai
- Created from: NA-266 Killa Abdullah

NA-266 Killa Abdullah-cum-Chaman (این اے-266، قلعه عبداللہ-کم-چمن) is a constituency for the National Assembly of Pakistan.

== Assembly Segments ==
Constituency number	Constituency	District	Current MPA	Party
50	PB-50 Killa Abdullah	Killa Abdullah	Zmarak Khan Achakzai	ANP
51	PB-51 Chaman	Chaman	Abdul Khaliq Khan Achakzai	PML(N)

== Members of Parliament ==
=== 2018–2023: NA-263 Killa Abdullah ===
Election	Member	Party
2018	Maulana Salahuddin Ayyubi	MMA

=== 2024–present: NA-266 Killa Abdullah-cum-Chaman ===
Election	Member	Party
2024	Mahmood Khan Achakzai	PMAP

== Election 2002 ==
General elections were held on 10 October 2002. Mahmood Khan Achakzai of Pakhtun-khwa Milli Awami Party won by 35,385 votes.

General election 2002: NA-262 Killa Abdullah
Party	Candidate	Votes	%	±%
PMAP	Mahmood Khan Achakzai	35,385	41.35	
MMA	Muhammad Haneef	33,868	39.57	
PPP	Bismillah Khan	14,763	17.25	
Others	Others (four candidates)	1,569	1.83	
Turnout		89,106	33.56	
Total valid votes		85,585	96.05	
Rejected ballots		3,521	3.95	
Majority		1,717	1.78	
Registered electors		265,538		

== Election 2008 ==
General elections were held on 18 February 2008. Haji Rozuddin of Muttahida Majlis-e-Amal won by 45,590 votes.

General election 2008: NA-262 Killa Abdullah
Party	Candidate	Votes	%	±%
MMA	Rozuddin	45,590	33.55	
ANP	Malik Muhammad Usman Achakzai	44,455	32.72	
PPP	Nazar Muhammad Kakar	27,548	20.27	
Independent	Janan Khan Achakzai	13,114	9.65	
Others	Others (three candidates)	5,180	3.81	
Turnout		137,379	35.03	
Total valid votes		135,887	98.91	
Rejected ballots		1,492	1.09	
Majority		1,135	0.83	
Registered electors		392,221		
MMA gain from PMAP				

== Election 2013 ==
General elections were held on 11 May 2013. Mahmood Khan Achakzai of Pakhtun-khwa Milli Awami Party won by 37,814 and became the member of National Assembly.

General election 2013: NA-262 Killa Abdullah
Party	Candidate	Votes	%	±%
PMAP	Mahmood Khan Achakzai	37,814	42.51	
JUI (F)	Muhammad Sher Ali	25,254	28.39	
JUINP	Salah-Uddin	13,793	15.50	
Others	Others (sixteen candidates)	12,655	13.75	
PPP	Nazar Muhammad Khan	3,435	3.86	
ANP	Abdul Jabbar Khan	3,111	3.50	
Independent	Attaullah Khan	1,982	2.23	
Turnout		92,042	49.80	
Total valid votes		88,963	96.65	
Rejected ballots		3,079	3.35	
Majority		12,560	14.12	
Registered electors		184,824		
PMAP gain from MMA				

== By-Election 2013 ==
By-Election 2013: NA-262 Killa Abdullah
Party	Candidate	Votes	%	±%
PMAP	Abdul Qadir Khan Wadan	37,584	58.67	
JUI (F)	Qari Muhammad Shair Ali	19,548	30.52	
JUINP	Haji Molvi Muhammad Hanif	6,174	9.64	
Others	Others (seven candidates)	750	1.17	
Turnout		65,320	35.15	
Total valid votes		64,056	98.07	
Rejected ballots		1,264	1.93	
Majority		18,036	28.15	
Registered electors		185,836		
PMAP hold		Swing		

== Election 2018 ==
General elections were held on 25 July 2018.

General election 2018: NA-263 Killa Abdullah
Party	Candidate	Votes	%	±%
MMA	Maulana Salahuddin Ayyubi	37,971	41.26	
ANP	Asghar Khan Achakzai	21,417	23.27	
PMAP	Mahmood Khan Achakzai	19,989	21.72	
Others	Others (sixteen candidates)	12,655	13.75	
Turnout		95,450	41.03	
Total valid votes		92,032	96.42	
Rejected ballots		3,418	3.58	
Majority		16,554	17.99	
Registered electors		232,613		
MMA gain from PMAP				

== Election 2024 ==
General elections were held on 8 February 2024. Mahmood Khan Achakzai won the election with 67,530 votes.

General election 2024: NA-266 Killa Abdullah-cum-Chaman
Party	Candidate	Votes	%	±%
PMAP	Mahmood Khan Achakzai	67,530	33.34	▲11.62
JUI (F)	Maulana Salahuddin Ayyubi	58,590	28.92	N/A
ANP	Muheeb Ullah Kakar	38,367	18.94	▼4.33
Others	Others (fifteen candidates)	38,089	18.80	
Turnout		203,278	56.81	▲15.78
Total valid votes		202,576	99.65	
Rejected ballots		702	0.35	
Majority		8,940	4.41	
Registered electors		357,834		
PMAP gain from ANP				

== See also ==
- NA-265 Pishin
- NA-1 Upper Chitral-cum-Lower Chitral
