= NA-258 Panjgur-cum-Kech =

Constituency of the National Assembly of Pakistan

- Constituency for the National Assembly of Pakistan
- Region: Panjgur District; Kech District (Partly)
- Electorate: 225,058

Current constituency
- Created: 2022
- Party: National Party
- Member: Waja Pullain Baloch
- Created from: NA-270 (Panjgur-cum-Washuk-cum-Awaran); NA-271 (Kech)

NA-258 Panjgur-cum-Kech (این اے-258، پنجگور-کم-کیچ) is a constituency for the National Assembly of Pakistan. It comprises the districts of Panjgur, and Kech from southwestern Balochistan. It was created in 2022 by taking parts of Panjgur District and Kech District from NA-270 (Panjgur-cum-Washuk-cum-Awaran) and NA-271 (Kech) respectively.

== Assembly Segments ==
Constituency number	Constituency	District	Current MPA	Party
27	PB-27 Kech-III	Kech	Barkat Ali Rind	PML(N)
28	PB-28 Kech-IV	Kech	Mir Asghar Rind	PPP
29	PB-29 Panjgur-I	Panjgur	Mir Asadullah Baloch	BNP(A)
30	PB-30 Panjgur-II	Panjgur	Rahmat Saleh Baloch	NP

== Members of Parliament ==
=== 2018–2023: NA-270 Panjgur-cum-Washuk-cum-Awaran ===
Election	Member	Party
2018	Ehsanullah Reki	BAP

=== 2024–present: NA-258 Panjgur-cum-Kech ===
Election	Member	Party
2024	Waja Pullain Baloch	NP

== Election 2018 ==
General elections were held on 25 July 2018.

General election 2018: NA-270 Panjgur-cum-Washuk-cum-Awaran
Party	Candidate	Votes	%	±%
BAP	Ehsanullah Reki	18,568	21.19	
BNP (A)	Muhammad Hanif	16,040	18.30	
MMA	Attaullah Baloch	15,912	18.16	
BNP (M)	Mir Nazeer Ahmed Baloch	12,188	13.91	
PML(N)	Abdul Qadir Baloch	10,822	12.35	
NP	Waja Pullain Baloch	4,062	4.63	
Independent	Mir Muhammad Nawaz Muhammad Hassani	3,089	3.52	
Independent	Shehbaz Khan	3,037	3.46	
Others	Others (eight candidates)	3,926	4.48	
Turnout		93,796	40.48	
Total valid votes		87,644	93.44	
Rejected ballots		6,152	6.56	
Majority		2,528	2.89	
Registered electors		231,728		
BAP gain from PML(N)				

== Election 2024 ==
General elections were held on 8 February 2024. Waja Pullain Baloch won the election with 22,318 votes.

General election 2024: NA-258 Panjgur-cum-Kech
Party	Candidate	Votes	%	±%
NP	Waja Pullain Baloch	22,318	37.47	▲32.84
BNP (A)	Noor Ahmed Adil	13,798	23.17	▲4.87
PML(N)	Mohammad Aslam Buledi	10,379	17.43	▲5.08
BNP (M)	Zahid Hussain	6,591	11.07	▼2.84
JUI (F)	Zafarullah Khan Gichki	2,552	4.28	N/A
PPP	Sabir Ali Baloch	2,355	3.95	▲3.13
Others	Others (twelve candidates)	1,569	2.63	
Turnout		60,854	27.04	▼13.44
Total valid votes		59,562	97.88	
Rejected ballots		1,292	2.12	
Majority		8,520	14.30	
Registered electors		225,058		
NP gain from BNP (M)				

== See also ==
- NA-257 Hub-cum-Lasbela-cum-Awaran
- NA-259 Kech-cum-Gwadar
