= PB-42 Quetta-V =

Constituency of the Provincial Assembly of Balochistan, Pakistan

- Constituency for the Provincial Assembly of Balochistan
- Region: Quetta Cantonment and City area of Quetta District

Current constituency
- Party: Balochistan National Party (Mengal)
- Member: Malik Naseer Ahmed Shahwani
- Created from: PB-6 Quetta-VI (2002-2018); PB-32 Quetta IX (2018-2023)

PB-42 Quetta-V (پی بی-42 کوئٹہ-5) is a constituency of the Provincial Assembly of Balochistan.

== General elections 2024 ==
Provincial election 2024: PB-42 Quetta-V
Party	Candidate	Votes	%	±%
PML(N)	Sheikh Zarak Khan Mandokhail	10,953	24.02	
HDP	Abdul Khaliq Hazara	8,499	18.64	
Independent	Imran Hussain (Note: Filed nomination papers as PTI candidate but ECP allowed him to run as an Independent)	6,038	13.24	
MWM	Ali Hasnain	3,759	8.25	
PPP	Syed Muhamamd Dawood Shah	3,386	7.43	
Independent	Tahir Mehmood Khan	3,090	6.78	
JUI (F)	Muhammad Shoaib	1,449	3.18	
Independent	Mudisar Sadiq	1,208	2.65	
BAP	Ehsan Ullah	1,059	2.32	
Others	Others (fifty three candidates)	6,153	13.49	
Turnout		46,483	32.31	
Total valid votes		45,594	98.09	
Rejected ballots		889	1.91	
Majority		2,454	5.38	
Registered electors		143,878		

== General elections 2018 ==
Contesting candidates	Party affiliation	Votes polled

== General elections 2013 ==
Contesting candidates	Party affiliation	Votes polled

== See also ==
- PB-41 Quetta-IV
- PB-43 Quetta-VI
