= Sheikh Zarak Khan Mandokhail =

Pakistani politician

Member of the Provincial Assembly of Balochistan
- Incumbent
- Assumed office 29 February 2024
- Constituency: PB-42 Quetta-V

Personal details
- Born: Quetta District, Balochistan, Pakistan
- Party: PMLN (2024-present)

Sheikh Zarak Khan Mandokhail is a Pakistani politician from Quetta District. He is currently serving as a member of the Provincial Assembly of Balochistan since February 2024.

== Career ==
He contested the 2024 general elections as a Pakistan Muslim League (N) candidate from PB-42 Quetta-V. He secured 10,423 votes while the runner-up was Abdul Khaliq Hazara of Hazara Democratic Party who secured 8,520 votes.
