= Sardar Yaqoob Nasar =

Pakistani politician

- سردار یعقوب ناصر

President of PMLN Interim
- In office 17 August 2017 – 3 October 2017
- Preceded by: Nawaz Sharif
- Succeeded by: Nawaz Sharif

Member of the National Assembly of Pakistan
- Incumbent
- Assumed office 29 February 2024
- Constituency: NA-252 Musakhel-cum-Barkhan-cum-Loralai-cum-Duki

Member of the Senate of Pakistan
- In office March 2015 – March 2021
- Constituency: General seat from Islamabad

Personal details
- Born: Sardar Muhammad Yaqoob Khan Nasar; 10 January 1947 (age 79) Quetta, Baluchistan, British India (present-day Balochistan, Pakistan)
- Party: PMLN (1993-present)
- Relations: Sardar Dur Muhammad Nasir (cousin)
- Education: University of Punjab, University of Balochistan

Sardar Muhammad Yaqoob Khan Nasar (Urdu: سردار محمد یعقوب خان ناصر; born 10 January 1947) is a Pakistani politician who is serving as a member of the National Assembly of Pakistan since February 2024. He previously served as a member of the Senate of Pakistan. He was the Interim president of the Pakistan Muslim League (N) in 2017. He succeeded Nawaz Sharif after his disqualification by the Supreme Court of Pakistan.

== Early and personal life ==
Sardar Yaqoob Nasar, chief of the Pashtun Nasar tribe, graduated from the University of the Punjab in 1969 and obtained a Masters in Political Science from the University of Balochistan in 1983.

He is involved in agriculture and coal mining as business interests since a young age. He is married and has four sons and six daughters. The late politician Sardar Dur Muhammad Nasir was his cousin.

== Political career ==
Sardar Yaqoob Nasar has served as member of the National Assembly of Pakistan from the Loralai constituency and the Provincial President (Balochistan) and Central Vice President of PML (N).

He has been returning to Parliament regularly since his first electoral win in 1985.

He is a close aide of former Prime Minister Nawaz Sharif.

He served as a member of Balochistan Provincial Assembly and as Provincial Minister for Irrigation, Development and Public Health from 1985 to 1988, as member of National Assembly and Federal Minister for Environment, Afghan Refugees, State and Frontier Region from 1990 to 1993 and as Senator from 1994 to 1997. He was elected to the National Assembly again in 1997 and served as Minister for Railways from 1997 to 1999.

== Controversies ==
=== Loss as a result of election rigging ===
In the 18 February 2008 elections, massive election rigging was conducted under the Musharraf's regime, in which case thousands of bogus and unregistered votes were cast in favour of the rival candidate Mr. Israr Tareen representing PMLQ. A political party that was being supported at the time by then President Pervez Musharraf's Government.

There were approximately 35000 unregistered votes cast against Sardar Nasar in that election by Pervez Musharraf's provincial government of the time. After a lengthy Court battle, Balochistan High Court ordered a recount. Upon proof of approx. 350000 bogus and illegal votes of the rival candidate, Baluchistan High Court directed the Election Commission of Pakistan to reverse the original decision and declare Sardar Nasar as winner. Sardar Yaqoob Khan Nasar than returned to the National Assembly seat on representing the people of his constituency.

== See also ==
- Pakistan Muslim League (N)
- Loralai District

Party political offices
| Preceded by Nawaz Sharif | Leader of the Pakistan Muslim League-Nawaz; Interim; 2017 | Succeeded by Nawaz Sharif |
