= Kohzad =

Kohzad is a surname. Notable people with the surname include:

- Ahmed Ali Kohzad (born 1979), Pakistani politician
- Mohammad Hasan Kohzad, member of 4th committee to review Constitutional Loya Jirga
- Youssof Kohzad (1935–2019), Afghan writer, painter, playwright, artist, poet, actor, and art consultant
