= 1970 Balochistan Provincial Assembly election =

1993 election in Pakistan

The 1970 Balochistan Provincial Assembly election was held on 17 December 1970. 21 members were elected. The assembly convened for its inaugural session on 2 May 1972; Ataullah Mengal was elected as the Chief Minister while Ghous Bakhsh Raisani became the Leader of Opposition.

== Results ==
Constituency-wise result
Constituency Number	Constituency Name	Name	Party
PB-1	Quetta I	Saifullah Khan Paracha	PPP
PB-2	Quetta II	Khair Bakhsh Marri	NAP
PB-3	Quetta III	Moulvi Muhammad Hussain Shah	JUI
PB-4	Quetta IV	Abdul Samad Khan Achakzai	PMAP
PB-5	Sibi I	Ahmad Nawaz Khan Bugti	NAP
PB-6	Sibi II	Sardar Mohammad Khan Barozai	NAP
PB-7	Sibi III	Mir Shah Nawaz Khan Shaliani	PPP
PB-8	Loralai I	Anwar Jan Khetran	PML
PB-9	Loralai-cum-Zhob	Molvi Saleh Muhammad	JUI
PB-10	Zhob	Moulvi Syed Muhammad Shams-ud-Din	JUI
PB-11	Chagai	Gul Khan Nasir	NAP
PB-12	Kachhi I	Ghous Bakhsh Raisani	NAP
PB-13	Kachhi II	Mir Chakar Khan Domki	NAP
PB-14	Kachhi-cum-Kalat	Mir Yousaf Ali Khan Magsi	PPP
PB-15	Kalat I	Prince Agha Abdul Karim Khan	NAP
PB-16	Kalat II	Ataullah Mengal	NAP
PB-17	Makran I	Mir Dost Muhammad Khan	NAP
PB-18	Makran II	Sardar Abdul Rehman Khan	NAP
PB-19	Kharan	Mir Sher Ali Khan Nosherwani	NAP
PB-20	Lasbela	Jam Ghulam Qadir Khan	PML
PB-21	Reserved for Women	Fazila Aliani	NAP
