= PB-40 Quetta-III =

Constituency of the Provincial Assembly of Balochistan, Pakistan

- Constituency for the Provincial Assembly of Balochistan
- Region: Quetta City area of Quetta District

Current constituency
- Created: 2018
- Party: Hazara Democratic Party
- Member: Qadir Nayel
- Created from: PB-6 Quetta-VI (2002-2018); PB-26 Quetta-III (2018-2023)

PB-40 Quetta-III (پی بی-40 کوئٹہ-3) is a constituency of the Provincial Assembly of Balochistan.

== General elections 2024 ==
Provincial election 2024: PB-40 Quetta-III
Party	Candidate	Votes	%	±%
PPP	Samad Khan Gorgage	9,835	32.26	
HDP	Qadir Nayel	5,571	18.27	
PMAP	Akhtar Muhammad	4,118	13.51	
JUI (F)	Rahim Uddin	3,097	10.16	
Independent	Dawood Shah Kakar (Note: Filed nomination papers as PTI candidate but ECP allowed him to run as an Independent)	1,964	6.44	
Independent	Muhammad Asif S/O Muhammad Ameer	1,848	6.06	
Others	Others (thirty two candidates)	4,054	13.30	
Turnout		31,167	40.63	
Total valid votes		30,487	97.82	
Rejected ballots		680	2.18	
Majority		4,264	13.99	
Registered electors		76,715		

== General elections 2018 ==
Contesting candidates	Party affiliation	Votes polled

== General elections 2013 ==
Contesting candidates	Party affiliation	Votes polled

== See also ==
- PB-39 Quetta-II
- PB-41 Quetta-IV
