= Waja Pullain Baloch =

Member of the National Assembly of Pakistan from Balochistan (2024–2029)

- واجا پُلین بلوچ

Member of the National Assembly of Pakistan
- Incumbent
- Assumed office 29 February 2024
- Constituency: NA-258 Panjgur-cum-Kech

Personal details
- Party: NP (2024-present)

Waja Pullain Baloch (Urdu: واجا پُلین بلوچ) is a Pakistani politician who has been a member of the National Assembly of Pakistan since February 2024.

== Political career ==
Baloch won the 2024 Pakistani general election from NA-258 Panjgur-cum-Kech as a National Party candidate. He received 22,261 votes while runner up Noor Ahmed Adil of Balochistan National Party (Awami) received 13,762 votes.
