= Jamal Shah Kakar =

Member of the National Assembly of Pakistan from Quetta (2024–2029)

- جمال شاہ کاکڑ

Member of the National Assembly of Pakistan
- Incumbent
- Assumed office 29 February 2024
- Constituency: NA-263 Quetta-II

Speaker of the Provincial Assembly of Balochistan
- In office 30 November 2002 – 8 April 2008
- Deputy: Mohammad Aslam Bhutani
- Preceded by: Mir Abdul Jabbar Khan
- Succeeded by: Mohammad Aslam Bhutani

Member of the Provincial Assembly of Balochistan
- In office 28 November 2002 – 28 November 2007
- Constituency: PB-18 Zhob-I

Personal details
- Born: Zhob
- Party: PMLN (2013-present)
- Other political affiliations: MMA (2002-2008)

Jamal Shah Kakar (Urdu: جمال شاہ کاکڑ) is a Pakistani politician who has been a member of the National Assembly of Pakistan since February 2024. He previously served as the Speaker of the Provincial Assembly of Balochistan from November 2002 to April 2008, and as a member of the Provincial Assembly of Balochistan from November 2002 to November 2007.

== Political career ==
Kakar was elected to the Provincial Assembly of Balochistan in the 2002 Balochistan provincial election from PB-18 Zhob-I as an independent candidate, and later joined the Muttahida Majlis-e-Amal (MMA).

On 30 November 2002, he was elected to the Speakership of the Provincial Assembly of Balochistan. He received 37 votes of the total 59 votes cast, while his opponent, Abdul Rahim Ziaratwal of the Pashtunkhwa Milli Awami Party (PMAP) received 10 votes.

He contested the 2013 Balochistan provincial election from PB-18 Zhob-I as a candidate of the Pakistan Muslim League (N) (PML(N)), but was unsuccessful. He received 1,796 votes and was defeated by Gulab Khan, a candidate of Jamiat Ulema-e-Islam (F) (JUI(F)).

Kakar won the 2024 Pakistani general election from NA-263 Quetta-II as a Pakistan Muslim League (N) candidate. He received 27,168 votes while runner up Independent (politician) Supported (PTI) Pakistan Tehreek-e-Insaf candidate Salar Khan Kakar received 25,366 votes.
