= Muhammad Israr Tareen =

Pakistani politician

Member of the National Assembly of Pakistan
- In office 13 August 2018 – 10 August 2023
- Constituency: NA-258 (Loralai-cum-Musakhel-cum-Ziarat-cum-Duki-cum-Harnai)

Personal details
- Party: Pakistan Peoples Party (2023-present)
- Other political affiliations: BAP (2018-2023); PML(Q) (2013-2018)

Sardar Muhammad Israr Tareen is a Pakistani politician who had been a member of the National Assembly of Pakistan from August 2018 till August 2023.

== Political career ==
In the 2008 General Elections he had won from his constituency NA263, on the PML-Q ticket, by defeating PML-N candidate Sardar Yaqub Nasar. Due to election commissions allegation on Sardar Israr Tareen over rigging, he was de seated from his constituency in May 2011, but later he again did petition on his rival candidate and got the decision back in his favour in June 2012, he was again restored to the National assembly and remained member till March 2013. In March 2008, ran for the office of Speaker of the National Assembly of Pakistan but was unsuccessful and lost the office to Fehmida Mirza. In spite being in opposition in zardaris government he remained close to him in political terms.

He was elected to the National Assembly of Pakistan from Constituency NA-258 (Loralai-cum-Musakhel-cum-Ziarat-cum-Duki-cum-Harnai) as a candidate of the Balochistan Awami Party in the 2018 Pakistani general election.He remained member national assembly during imran khans regime, but after Imran Khans governments dismissal on 9 April 2022, he later was inducted in Shahbaz Sharifs Cabinet as Federal Minister for Defence Production and took oath on 19 April 2022. Due too Asif Zardaris support he was inducted in cabinet, though his rival candidate Sardar Yaqub Nasar who is considered to be close aide to Nawaz Sharif made lots of efforts and opposed, but due to Asif Zardaris support Sardar Israr Tareen secured his post. He remained in office till 9 August 2023, till governments tenure finished. Later he joined PPP after leaving BAP party, was candidate for NA on PPP ticket, in 2024 General elections but lost the seat, due to heavy rigging and invalid activities.
