= PB-7 Ziarat cum Harnai =

Constituency of the Provincial Assembly of Balochistan

- Constituency for the Provincial Assembly of Balochistan
- Region: Harnai District & Ziarat District

Current constituency
- Party: Balochistan Awami Party
- Member: Noor Muhammad Dummar
- Created from: PB-7 (Ziarat) & PB-22 (Sibi-II)

PB-7 Ziarat cum Harnai (پی بی-7 زیارت کم ہرنائی) is a constituency of the Provincial Assembly of Balochistan.

== General elections 2024 ==
Provincial election 2024: PB-7 Ziarat cum Harnai
Party	Candidate	Votes	%	±%
PML(N)	Noor Muhammad Dummar	29,857	39.24	
JUI (F)	Khalil Dummar	25,973	34.14	
PMAP	Abdul Rahim	10,947	14.39	
Independent	Nawab Khan (Note: Filed nomination papers as PTI candidate but ECP allowed him to run as an independent)	6,082	7.99	
PNAP	Mahr Ullah	1,696	2.23	
Others	Others (twenty seven candidates)	1,532	2.01	
Turnout		77,984	62.15	
Total valid votes		76,087	97.57	
Rejected ballots		1,897	2.43	
Majority		3,884	5.10	
Registered electors		125,478		

== General elections 2013 ==
Contesting candidates	Party affiliation	Votes polled

== General elections 2008 ==
Contesting candidates	Party affiliation	Votes polled

== See also ==
- PB-6 Duki
- PB-8 Sibi
