= Gwadar protest =

Protest in Gwadar, Balochistan, Pakistan

- Date: 2021
- Location: Gwadar, Pakistan
- Goals: Free access to the sea for fishermen End to harassment by the Coast Guard Seizure of vehicles Closure of trades at the border
- Methods: Protest
- Status: Ongoing

Parties
Protesters	Government of Pakistan

Lead figures
Maulana Hidayat ur Rehman Baloch	

Number
Thousands of women along with their infants and children	

Gwadar protest were protests from 15 November 2021 on Gwadar's Port Road led Zainab Baloch which later on joined by Maulana Hidayat ur Rehman Baloch and other leaders. Thousands of women along with their infants and children protested and wanted free access to the sea for fishermen, an end to harassment by the Coast Guard, seizure of vehicles and closure of trades at the border.
