= Syed Mehmood Shah =

Pakistani politician

Member of the National Assembly of Pakistan
- In office 13 August 2018 – 10 August 2023
- Constituency: NA-267 (Mastung-cum-Shaheed Sikandarabad-cum-Kalat)

Personal details
- Party: Jamiat Ulema-e-Islam (F)

Agha Syed Mehmood Shah is a Pakistani politician who had been a member of the National Assembly of Pakistan from August 2018 till August 2023.

== Political career ==
He was elected to the National Assembly of Pakistan from Constituency NA-267 (Mastung-cum-Shaheed Sikandarabad-cum-Kalat) as a candidate of Muttahida Majlis-e-Amal in the 2018 Pakistani general election.

His father Syed Agha Sadiqee Shah was elected MNA in 1993 brother Agha Fazal-ur-Rehman Shah was the Chairman District Kalat.
