= Samad Khan Gorgage =

Pakistani politician

Member of the Provincial Assembly of Balochistan
- Incumbent
- Assumed office 29 February 2024
- Constituency: PB-40 Quetta-III

Personal details
- Born: Quetta District, Balochistan, Pakistan
- Political party: PPP (2024-present)
- Relations: Sardar Umar Gorgaij (Father)

Abdul Samad Khan Gorgage Baloch is a Pakistani politician from Quetta District. He is currently serving as a member of the Provincial Assembly of Balochistan since February 2024.

== Career ==
He contested the 2024 general elections as a Pakistan Peoples Party Parliamentarians candidate from PB-40 Quetta-III. He secured 9225 votes while his runner-up was Qadir Ali of Hazara Democratic Party who secured 5588 votes.
