= Malik Shah Gorgaij =

Member of the National Assembly of Pakistan from Balochistan (2024–2029)

- ملک شاہ گورگیج

Member of the National Assembly of Pakistan
- In office 29 February 2024 – 1 March 2025
- Constituency: NA-259 Kech-cum-Gwadar

Personal details
- Party: PPP (2024-present)
- Relations: Mir Ubaidullah Gorgage (Son)Yasir Malik (son); Akbar Askani (Son-in-law)

Malik Shah Gorgaij (Urdu: ملک شاہ گورگیج) is a Pakistani politician who has been a member of the National Assembly of Pakistan since February 2024.

== Political career ==
Gorgaij won the 2024 Pakistani general election from NA-259 Kech-cum-Gwadar as a Pakistan People’s Party candidate. He received 40,778 votes while runners up Abdul Malik Baloch of National Party received 22,298 votes.
