= Abdul Khaliq Khan Achakzai =

Pakistani politician

Speaker of the Provincial Assembly of Balochistan
- Incumbent
- Assumed office 29 February 2024
- Preceded by: Jan Mohammad Jamali

Member of the Provincial Assembly of Balochistan
- Incumbent
- Assumed office 29 February 2024
- Constituency: PB-51 Chaman

Personal details
- Party: PMLN (2008-present)
- Parent: Haji Habib Khan

Abdul Khaliq Khan Achakzai is a Pakistani politician from Chaman District and a member of the Provincial Assembly of Balochistan since February 2024.

== Early life ==
Achakzai is from Chaman. He is a graduate of arts and served as a captain in the Pakistan armed forces.

== Career ==
In 2008, he was first elected to the Provincial Assembly of Balochistan as an independent candidate from PB-11 Killa Abdullah-I, with 11,378 votes. He later joined the Pakistan Muslim League (N) and helped form a coalition government with the PPP. From 2008 to 2013, he was the Minister for Youth Affairs.

In the 2013 election, he ran again as an independent from PB-11 Killa Abdullah-1 but was unsuccessful, finishing third. He then continued as a provincial member of Pakistan Muslim League (N).

In May 2018, he ended his affiliation with Pakistan Muslim League (N) and joined the newly formed Balochistan Awami Party. However, he was unsuccessful in the 2018 elections.

In December 2023, he left Balochistan Awami Party and ran as an independent candidate for the 2024 general elections from PB-51 Chaman. Asghar Khan Achakzai of Awami National Party was the runner-up with 19,623 votes.

His victory sparked controversy because he had little political activity in the area.

== Personal life ==
His nephew, Kaleemullah Khan, is a former captain of the Pakistan national football team.
