= Abdul Khaliq Hazara (politician) =

Pakistani MP and Provincial Minister

Abdul Khaliq
- عبدالخالق هزاره

Chairman of Hazara Democratic Party
- Incumbent
- Assumed office November 2010
- Preceded by: Hussain Ali Yousafi

Member of the Provincial Assembly of Balochistan
- In office 13 August 2018 – 12 August 2023
- Constituency: PB-27 Quetta-IV

Personal details
- Born: Abdul Khaliq Quetta
- Party: HDP (2018-present)
- Other political affiliations: TTAP (2025-present)
- Occupation: Member of parliament
- Ethnicity: Hazara

Abdul Khaliq Hazara (Hazaragi: عبدالخالق هزاره) is a Pakistani politician in Quetta, Balochistan, Pakistan. He has been the Chairman of Hazara Democratic Party (HDP) since November 2010, and has been a member of the Quetta city council.

== Political career ==
Abdul Khaliq Hazara started his political career from Hazara Student Federation during his student life. He has been active for the rights of the Hazara People in Quetta, where they are in minority. He remained Naib Nazim of Quetta District Balochistan.

In the 2018 Balochistan provincial election, he was elected to the Provincial Assembly of Balochistan as a member from PB-27 Quetta-IV and on 8 September 2018, he was inducted into the provincial cabinet of Chief Minister Jam Kamal Khan as adviser for sports, culture and youth affairs department. Later on he was assigned the ministries of the said departments.

== Achievements ==
Abdul Khaliq and his party Hazara Democratic Party began working on social problems such as infrastructure, education and healthcare which were his promises during the election campaign. Many have praised Hazara Democratic Party for their works which include road infrastructure, Healthcare centre, a College under construction, and easy access to Local council for legal advice. However, Hazara Democratic Party and Abdul Khaliq Hazara have come under scrutiny due to their silence on the government's Deportation of undocumented Afghans from Pakistan policy. Abdul Khaliq Hazara claimed that Hazaras are brothers and their Nationality does not matter.

== See also ==
- Hazara Democratic Party
- List of Hazara people
- List of people from Quetta
- Ahmed Ali Kohzad
- Qadir Nayel
