= Noor Muhammad Dummar =

Pakistani politician

Provincial Minister of Planning and Development For Balochistan
- Incumbent
- Assumed office 4 April 2024
- Governor: Abdul Wali Kakar; Sheikh Jaffar Khan Mandokhail
- Chief Minister: Sarfraz Bugti

Provincial Minister of the Balochistan for Finance
- In office 30 August 2018 – 12 August 2023

Member of the Provincial Assembly of the Balochistan
- Incumbent
- Assumed office 29 February 2024
- Constituency: PB-7 Ziarat cum Harnai
- In office 13 August 2018 – 12 August 2023
- Constituency: PB-6 Ziarat-cum-Harnai

Personal details
- Party: PMLN (2023-present)
- Other political affiliations: BAP (2018-2023); PTI (2017); JUI-N (2013-2017)

Noor Muhammad Dummar is a Pakistani politician who is the Provincial Minister of Balochistan for Planning and Development, in office since March 2024. He has been a member of the Provincial Assembly of the Balochistan since March 2024.

== Political career ==
He ran for the Provincial Assembly of Balochistan as a candidate of Jamiat Ulama-e-Islam Nazryati (JUI-N) from PB-7 Ziarat in the 2013 Balochistan provincial election but was unsuccessful. He received 10,037 votes and was defeated by Gul Muhammad Khan Dummar, a candidate of Jamiat Ulema-e-Islam (F) (JUI-F).

He ran for the Provincial Assembly as a Pakistan Tehreek-e-Insaf (PTI) candidate from PB-7 Ziarat in a March 2017 by-election but was unsuccessful. He received 12,552 votes and was defeated by Khalil Dummar, a candidate of JUI-F.

He was elected to the Provincial Assembly as a candidate of Balochistan Awami Party (BAP) from PB-6 (Ziarat-cum-Harnai) in the 2018 Balochistan provincial election.

On 27 August 2018, he was inducted into the provincial Balochistan cabinet of Chief Minister Jam Kamal Khan. On 30 August, he was appointed Provincial Minister of Balochistan for public health engineering.

He was re-elected to the Provincial Assembly from PB-7 Ziarat cum Harnai as a candidate of Pakistan Muslim League (N) (PML-N) in the 2024 Balochistan provincial election. He received 29,857 votes and defeated Khalil Dummar, a candidate of JUI-F.
