= PB-33 Kharan =

Constituency of the Provincial Assembly of Balochistan, Pakistan

- Constituency for the Provincial Assembly of Balochistan
- Region: Kharan District

Current constituency
- Party: Balochistan National Party (Mengal)
- Member: Sanaullah Baloch
- Created from: PB-46 Kharan-I

PB-33 Kharan (پی بی-33 خاران)is a constituency of the Provincial Assembly of Balochistan.

== General elections 2024 ==
Provincial election 2024: PB-33 Kharan
Party	Candidate	Votes	%	±%
PML(N)	Mir Shoaib Nosherwani	11,215	32.44	
BNP (M)	Sanaullah Baloch	9,051	26.18	
PPP	Mir Noor Uddin Nosherwani	6,171	17.85	
JUI (F)	Parvez Ahmed	5,733	16.58	
BNP (A)	Ehsan Ahmed	1,306	3.78	
Others	Others (fourteen candidates)	1,095	3.17	
Turnout		35,600	52.46	
Total valid votes		34,571	97.11	
Rejected ballots		1,029	2.89	
Majority		2,164	6.26	
Registered electors		67,855		

== See also ==
- PB-32 Chagai
- PB-34 Nushki
