= Qasim Suri =

Deputy speaker of the national assembly

- قاسم سوری
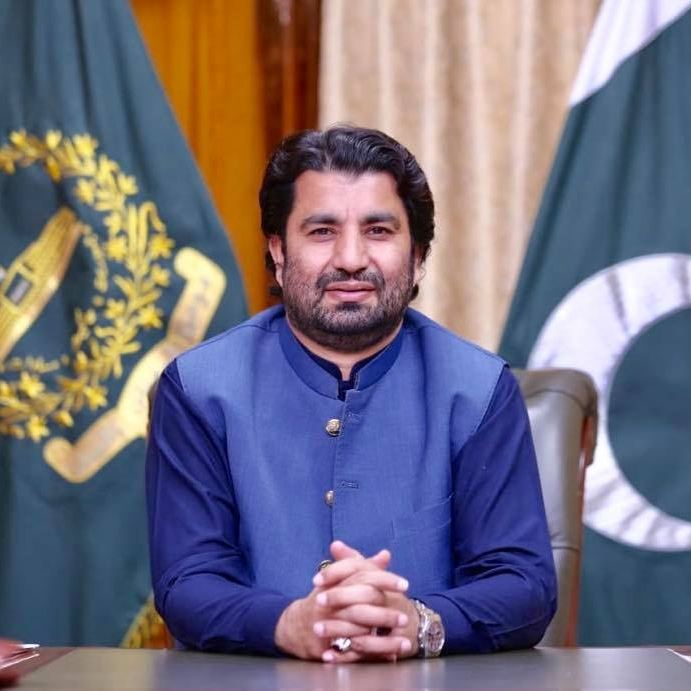

Member of the National Assembly of Pakistan
- In office 13 August 2018 – 17 January 2023
- Constituency: NA-265 (Quetta-II)

19th Deputy Speaker of the National Assembly of Pakistan
- In office 15 August 2018 – 16 April 2022
- Speaker of the National Assembly of Pakistan: Asad Qaiser
- Preceded by: Murtaza Javed Abbasi
- Succeeded by: Zahid Akram Durrani

Speaker of the National Assembly of Pakistan (Acting)
- In office 10 April 2022 – 16 April 2022
- Preceded by: Asad Qaiser
- Succeeded by: Raja Parvez Ashraf

President of PTI Balochistan
- In office 25 December 2021 – 14 April 2023
- Chairman: Imran Khan
- Succeeded by: Rao Umar Hashim Khan

Personal details
- Born: Muhammad Qasim Khan Suri; 16 January 1969 (age 57) Quetta, Balochistan, Pakistan
- Party: PTI (2007-present)
- Children: 3
- Education: Federal Government College
- Alma mater: University of Balochistan

Qasim Khan Suri (Urdu: قاسم خان سوری; born 16 January 1969) is a Pakistani politician. He served as the 19th Deputy Speaker of the National Assembly of Pakistan from 15 August 2018 to 16 April 2022. He had also been a member of the National Assembly of Pakistan from August 2018 till January 2023.

== Early life and education ==
He was born in January 1969 in Quetta, Balochistan to a Pashtun family of the Sur tribe, a sub-clan of the Lodhi tribe.

The eldest among three brothers and three sisters, his father Rafique Ahmed Khan had a medicine business which Suri took over in 1997 after his death, becoming the managing director of Muhammadi Traders of Pharmaceutical Distributor Est, while his other source of income is agriculture. His mother is of Urdu-speaking background.

Suri received his early education from the Quetta Islamia School and enrolled in Federal Government College in 1988. He received a bachelor's degree in political science in 1990 and a master's degree in international relations in 1992, both from the University of Balochistan.

== Political career ==
Suri have been associated with Pakistan Tehreek-e-Insaf (PTI) since 1996 but became active member in 2007.

He ran for the seat of the National Assembly of Pakistan as a candidate of PTI from Constituency NA-259 (Quetta) in the 2013 Pakistani general election but was unsuccessful. He received 16,006 votes and lost the seat to Mahmood Khan Achakzai.

He was elected to the National Assembly as a candidate of PTI from NA-265 (Quetta-II) in the 2018 Pakistani general election. He received 25,973 votes and defeated Nawabzada Lashkari Raisani.

Following Suri's successful election, PTI nominated him for the Deputy Speaker of the National Assembly of Pakistan on 13 August 2018. On 15 August 2018, he was elected as Deputy Speaker of the National Assembly of Pakistan. He received 183 votes out of a total of 327, defeating his opponent, Asad Mehmood who secured 144 votes.

On 27 September 2019, an election tribunal of Balochistan High Court nullified Suri's election and ordered fresh elections in the constituency, that resulted in his denotification. On 7 October 2019, however the Supreme Court of Pakistan suspended the election tribunal's decision and ordered the ECP not to issue the election schedule for NA-265.

On 3 April, as deputy speaker, Suri, dismissed a no-confidence motion against Imran Khan, claiming that the alleged US involvement was against Article 5 of the Constitution of Pakistan.

He resigned on 16 April 2022 to avoid the motion of no confidence against Imran Khan.
