= Anwar Jan Khetran =

Pakistani politician

Sardar Muhammad Anwar Jan Khetran (Urdu: سردار محمد انور جان کھیتران) was a Pakistani politician and the chief of Khetran, a Baloch tribe. Anwar was son of Ghazi Khan Khetran. Sardar Akbar Khetran was his only son who was killed in the 1990s. Politician Abdul Rehman Khetran is his nephew and the next tribal chief. He was the opposition leader of the Shahi Jirga which was the grand council of tribal elders in Balochistan. He contested in the Second Pakistani Constituent Assembly election in 1955 from Balochistan against Khan Abdul Jabbar Khan and lost. In the 1970 Balochistan Provincial Assembly election and 1976 Balochistan Provincial Assembly election, he was elected from PB-8 Loralai-I and PB-11 Loralai-III constituency respectively.
