= 1976 Balochistan Provincial Assembly election =

1993 election in Pakistan

Elections to the Provincial Assembly of Balochistan were held in 1976.

== Results ==
Constituency-wise result
Constituency Number	Constituency Name	Name	Party
PB-1	Quetta I	Malik Gul Hassan Kasi	Independent
PB-2	Quetta II	Talib Hussain	Independent
PB-3	Quetta III	Abdul Majeed Jaffar	PPP
PB-4	Quetta IV	Syed Aslam Shah	IJI
PB-5	Pishin I	Sardar Khair Muhammad Tareen	Independent
PB-6	Pishin II	Haji Malik Muhammad Rahim Khan	PPP
PB-7	Pishin III	Mohammad Sarwar Khan Kakar	Independent
PB-8	Pishin IV	Habib Jan Malik	IJI
PB-9	Loralai I	Mir Haji Tareen	IJI
PB-10	Loralai II	Naseer-ud-din Jogezai	PPP
PB-11	Loralai III	Anwar Jan Khetran	PML
PB-12	Zhob I	Nawabzada Taimor Shah Jogezai	PML
PB-13	Zhob II	Lal Gul Muhammad Sherani	JUI
PB-14	Zhob III	Moulvi Saleh Muhammad	JUI
PB-15	Chagai	Mir Nusrat Ullah Khan Sanjrani	PPP
PB-16	Sibi I	Sardar Muhammad Khan Barozai	PPP
PB-17	Sibi II	Mr. Muhammad Rahim Kakar	IJI
PB-18	Kohlu	Mir Qaisar Khan Marri	Independent
PB-19	Dera Bugti	Mir Ahmed Nawaz Khan Bugti	Independent
PB-20	Nasirabad I	Mir Shahnawaz Khan Shahliani	PPP
PB-21	Nasirabad II	Mir Zafarullah Khan Jamali	PPP
PB-22	Nasirabad III	Mir Nabi Bakhsh Khan Khoso	Independent
PB-23	Nasirabad IV	Mir Fateh Ali Umrani	Independent
PB-24	Kachhi I	Nawab Ghous Bakhsh Raisani	PPP
PB-25	Kachhi II	Sardar Bahadur Khan Bangulzai	Independent
PB-26	Kachhi III	Sardar Chakar Khan Domki	Independent
PB-27	Kachhi IV	Mir Tariq Hussain Magsi	PPP
PB-28	Kalat I	Mir Bahawal Khan Satakzai	IJI
PB-29	Kalat II	Mir Hussain Bakhsh Bangulzai	PPP
PB-30	Kalat-cum-Khuzdar	Sardar Doda Khan Zarakzai	PPP
PB-31	Khuzdar I	Haji Naik Muhammad Mengal	Independent
PB-32	Khuzdar II	Abdul Kareem Bizinjo	Independent
PB-33	Makran I	Mir Sabir Ali Baloch	PPP
PB-34	Makran II	Imdad Ali	PPP
PB-35	Makran III	Mir Qadir Bakhsh Baloch	Independent
PB-36	Makran IV	Nawabzada Abdul Hameed Khan Gichki	IJI
PB-37			
PB-38			
PB-39	Lasbela	Jam Ghulam Qadir Khan	PPP
PB-40			
