= Mir Shoaib Nosherwani =

Pakistani politician

Provincial Minister for Finance, Mines and Minerals, Balochistan
- Incumbent
- Assumed office 2024

Member Provincial Assembly of Balochistan
- Incumbent
- Assumed office 29 February 2024
- Constituency: PB-33 Kharan

Provincial Minister for Home & Tribal Affairs, Balochistan
- In office 2002–2008

Personal details
- Born: Kharan District, Balochistan, Pakistan
- Party: PMLN (2024-present)

Mir Shoaib Nosherwani is a Pakistani politician from Kharan District, Balochistan. He has served as a member of the Provincial Assembly of Balochistan on multiple occasions and has held several ministerial positions in the provincial government.

He was first elected as a member of the Provincial Assembly of Balochistan in the 2002 general elections, representing Kharan. During his tenure, he served as Provincial Minister for Interior.

He was re-elected to the Provincial Assembly in the 2008 general elections, again representing Kharan, and continued to serve in the provincial government until 2013.

In the 2024 general elections, Nosherwani was once again elected as a member of the Provincial Assembly of Balochistan. He was sworn in as a provincial minister on 19 April 2024 and was assigned the portfolios of Finance, Mines and Mineral Development.

Political career

- 2002: Elected to the Provincial Assembly of Balochistan for the first time.
- 2002–2007: Served as Provincial Minister for Interior.
- 2008: Re-elected to the Provincial Assembly from Kharan.
- 2008–2013: Served as a member of the Provincial Assembly and held a ministerial position.
- 2024: Re-elected to the Provincial Assembly of Balochistan.
- 19 April 2024: Sworn in as Provincial Minister for Finance, Mines and Mineral Development.

== Career ==
Mir Shoaib Nosherwani contested the 2024 general elections as a Pakistan Muslim League (N) candidate from the PB-33 Kharan constituency. He secured 11,207 votes, defeating his closest rival, Sanaullah Baloch of Balochistan National Party (Mengal) who received 9,050 votes.

Nosherwani was first elected to the Provincial Assembly of Balochistan in the 2002 general elections from Kharan. He secured 7476 votes while the runner-up was Muhammad Ashraf of National party who secured 5248 votes. In 2004, he was appointed Provincial Minister for Home affairs of Balochistan, a position he held until 2007.

Mir Shoaib Nosherwani re-elected to the Provincial Assembly of Balochistan in the 2008 general elections as a candidate of PML-Q from constituency PB-46 Kharan. He secured 6473, defeating Lt.General (R) Abdul Qadir Baloch who secured 5054 votes.
