= Maulana Salahuddin Ayyubi =

Pakistani politician

Member of the National Assembly of Pakistan
- In office 13 August 2018 – 10 August 2023
- Constituency: NA-263 (Killa Abdullah)

Personal details
- Party: ANP (2025-present)
- Other political affiliations: JUI (F) (2018-2025)

Maulana Salahuddin Ayyubi is a Pakistani politician who had been a member of the National Assembly of Pakistan from August 2018 till August 2023.

== Political career ==
He was elected to the National Assembly of Pakistan from Constituency NA-263 (Killa Abdullah) as a candidate of Muttahida Majlis-e-Amal in the 2018 Pakistani general election.
