= PB-41 Quetta-IV =

Constituency of the Provincial Assembly of Balochistan, Pakistan

- Constituency for the Provincial Assembly of Balochistan
- Region: Quetta City area of Quetta District

Current constituency
- Party: Hazara Democratic Party
- Member: Abdul Khaliq Hazara (politician)
- Created from: PB- 2 Quetta-II (2002-2018); PB-27 Quetta-IV (2018-2023)

PB-41 Quetta-IV (پی بی-41 کوئٹہ-4) is a constituency of the Provincial Assembly of Balochistan.

== General elections 2024 ==
Provincial election 2024: PB-41 Quetta-IV
Party	Candidate	Votes	%	±%
Independent	Wali Muhammad Noorzai	9,424	24.30	
Independent	Abdul Ghaffar Khan Kakar (Note: Filed nomination papers as PTI candidate but ECP allowed him to run as an Independent)	7,280	18.77	
PMAP	Abdul Qahar	6,677	17.21	
PPP	Noor Uddin Kakar	5,060	13.05	
JUI (F)	Muhammad Ayub Ayubi	3,408	8.79	
PML(N)	Sahar Gul	2,865	7.39	
PNAP	Nida Muhammad S/O Sultan Muhammad	1,253	3.23	
Others	Others (thirty eight candidates)	2,822	7.26	
Turnout		39,467	32.00	
Total valid votes		38,789	98.28	
Rejected ballots		678	1.72	
Majority		2,144	5.53	
Registered electors		123,318		

== General elections 2013 ==
General Elections won by Syed Muhammed Raza of Majlis Wahdat E Muslimeen

== General elections 2008 ==
General Elections won by Independent candidate Jan Ali Changezi who later joined PPP.

== See also ==
- PB-40 Quetta-III
- PB-42 Quetta-V
