= Hazara Student Federation =

Political party and student association in Pakistan

Hazara Student Federation (HSF) هزاره اسٹوڈنٹس فیڈریشن فدراسیون دانشجویان هزاره
- President: Manzoor Hussain Hannan
- General Secretary: Murtaza Sultan
- Secretary-General: Murtaza Sultan
- Secretary information: Asghar Ali
- Vice president: Iltaf Hussain
- Hazara Town unit President: Mansoor Rahimi
- Ibrahim Shaheed unit President: Abbas Ali
- Founder: Abdul Ali Asghari
- Founded: 1973
- Headquarters: Mariabad, Unit: Hazara Town, Ibrahim Shaheed Zonal Unit, Mariabad, Islamabad
- Ideology: Social democracy Democratic socialism
- National affiliation: Hazara Democratic Party
- Colors: Yellow, Red, and green

Party flag

Website
- HSF Official Website

The Hazara Students Federation (HSF), (Urdu: هزاره اسٹوڈنٹ فیڈریشن; Dari: فدراسیون دانشجویان هزاره) is an organization and political party in Pakistan for students from Hazara people. It was founded in 1970.

== History ==
In 1970, Hazara students who had enrolled in Government Science College, Quetta formed an organization called Hazara Students Organization (HSO) whose first President was Shabbir Hussain (the younger brother of Late Professor Nazir Hussain). In November 1972, its name was changed from Hazara Student Organization to Hazara Student Federation (HSF) by the majority opinion of the members. In 1973 Abdul Ali Asghari was elected President of Hazara Student Federation.

== See also ==
- Abdul Khaliq Hazara
- Ahmed Ali Kohzad
- Qadir Nayel
- Jan Ali Changezi
- Muhammad Musa
- Quetta
- Hazara Town
- Hazara Democratic Party
