= Ehsanullah Reki =

Pakistani politician

Member of the National Assembly of Pakistan
- In office 13 August 2018 – 10 August 2023
- Constituency: NA-270 (Panjgur-cum-Washuk-cum-Awaran)

Personal details
- Party: BAP (2018-present)

Ehsanullah Reki is a Pakistani politician who had been a member of the National Assembly of Pakistan two times, first term from 2008 to 2010 and second term from August 2018 till August 2023.

== Political career ==
He was elected to the National Assembly of Pakistan from Constituency NA-270 (Panjgur-cum-Washuk-cum-Awaran) as a candidate of Balochistan Awami Party in the 2018 Pakistani general election.
