= Wali Muhammad Noorzai =

Pakistani politician

Member of the Provincial Assembly of Balochistan
- Incumbent
- Assumed office 29 February 2024
- Constituency: PB-41 Quetta-IV

Personal details
- Born: Quetta District, Balochistan, Pakistan
- Party: PMLN (2024-present)

Wali Muhammad Noorzai is a Pakistani politician from Quetta District. He became a member of the Provincial Assembly of Balochistan in February 2024.

== Career ==
He contested the 2024 general elections as an independent candidate from PB-41 Quetta-IV. He secured 9,318 votes while his runner-up was Abdul Ghaffar Khan Kakar who secured 7,270 votes.
