= PB-4 Musakhel-cum-Barkhan =

Constituency of the Provincial Assembly of Balochistan, Pakistan

- Constituency for the Provincial Assembly of Balochistan
- Region: Musakhail District and Barkhan District

Current constituency
- Party: Balochistan Awami Party
- Member: Sardar Abdul Rehman Khetran
- Created from: PB-15 (Loralai-II) and PB-17 (Loralai-IV)

PB-4 Musakhel-cum-Barkhan (پی بی-4 موسیٰ خیل کم بارکھان) is a constituency of the Provincial Assembly of Balochistan.

== General elections 2024 ==
Provincial election 2024: PB-4 Musakhel-cum-Barkhan
Party	Candidate	Votes	%	±%
PML(N)	Abdul Rehman Khetran	25,198	32.13	
NP	Abdul Karim	19,212	24.49	
JUI (F)	Muhammad Sarwar	12,136	15.47	
Independent	Amir Zaman	9,079	11.58	
Independent	Mir Masood Khan Khetran	4,435	5.65	
Independent	Inam Shah Khetran	2,367	3.02	
Others	Others (twenty three candidates)	6,007	7.66	
Turnout		82,025	52.53	
Total valid votes		78,434	95.62	
Rejected ballots		3,591	4.38	
Majority		5,986	7.64	
Registered electors		156,139		

== General elections 2013 ==
Contesting candidates	Party affiliation	Votes polled

== General elections 2008 ==
Contesting candidates	Party affiliation	Votes polled

== See also ==
- PB-3 Killa Saifullah
- PB-5 Loralai
