= PB-27 Kech-III =

Constituency of the Provincial Assembly of Balochistan, Pakistan

- Constituency for the Provincial Assembly of Balochistan
- Region: Turbat Tehsil (partly) of Kech District

Current constituency
- Party: Balochistan Awami Party
- Member: Akbar Askani
- Created from: PB-50 (Kech-III) and PB-48 Kech IV

PB-27 Kech-III (پی بی-27 کیچ-3) is a constituency of the Provincial Assembly of Balochistan.

== General elections 2024 ==
Provincial election 2024: PB-27 Kech-III
Party	Candidate	Votes	%	±%
PML(N)	Barkat Ali Rind	15,250	59.13	
Independent	Jamil Ahmed Dashti	4,477	17.36	
NP	Abdul Rashid	3,336	12.93	
PPP	Abdul Rauf Rind	2,035	7.89	
Others	Others (sixteen candidates)	695	2.69	
Turnout		25,793	44.90	
Total valid votes		25,793	100	
Rejected ballots		0	0	
Majority		10,773	41.77	
Registered electors		57,450		

== See also ==
- PB-26 Kech-II
- PB-28 Kech-IV
