= Sardar Dur Muhammad Nasir =

Pakistani politician (1958–2020)

Member of the Provincial Assembly of Balochistan
- In office 29 May 2013 – 31 May 2018

Personal details
- Born: 15 September 1958 Duki, Balochistan, Pakistan
- Died: 8 June 2020 (aged 61) Karachi, Sindh, Pakistan
- Party: Pakistan Muslim League (N)

Sardar Dur Muhammad Nasir (15 September 1958 – 8 June 2020) was a Pakistani politician who was a member of the Provincial Assembly of Balochistan from May 2013 to May 2018.

== Early life and education ==
He was born on 15 September 1958 in Duki District, Pakistan.

He has done Matriculation.

== Political career ==
He was elected to the Provincial Assembly of Balochistan as a candidate of Pakistan Muslim League (N) from Constituency PB-14 Loralai-I in the 2013 Pakistani general election.

== Death ==
In 2020, Nasir contracted the COVID-19 during the COVID-19 pandemic in Pakistan. He isolated himself at his residence in Duki, but was later shifted to a hospital in Karachi when his condition deteriorated, where he died on 8 June.
