= Safia Fazlur Rehman =

Member of the Provincial Assembly of Balochistan (2024–2029)

- صفیہ فضلُ الرحمان

Member of the Provincial Assembly of Balochistan
- Incumbent
- Assumed office 29 February 2024
- Constituency: Reserved seat for women

Personal details
- Party: JUI (F) (2024-present)

Safia Fazlur Rehman (Urdu: صفیہ فضلُ الرحمان) is a Pakistani politician who is member of the Provincial Assembly of Balochistan.

== Political career ==
Safia was allotted a reserved seat for women in Provincial Assembly of Balochistan after the 2024 Balochistan provincial election as part of the reserved quota for Jamiat Ulema-e-Islam (F).
