= Barkat Ali Rind =

Pakistani politician

Member of the Provincial Assembly of Balochistan
- Incumbent
- Assumed office 29 February 2024
- Constituency: PB-27 Kech-III

Personal details
- Born: Kech District, Balochistan, Pakistan
- Party: PMLN (2024-present)

Barkat Ali Rind is a Pakistani politician from Kech District. He is currently serving as a member of the Provincial Assembly of Balochistan since February 2024.

== Career ==
He contested the 2024 general elections as a PML-N candidate from PB-27 Kech-III. He secured 15,552 votes while the runner-up was Jameel Dashti who secured 4,622 votes.
