= Meena Majeed =

Member of the Provincial Assembly of Balochistan (2024–2029)

- مینا مجید

Member of the Provincial Assembly of Balochistan
- Incumbent
- Assumed office 29 February 2024
- Constituency: Reserved seat for women

Personal details
- Party: PPP (2024-present)

Meena Majeed (Urdu: مینا مجید) is a Pakistani politician who is member of the Provincial Assembly of Balochistan.

== Political career ==
Meena was allotted a reserved seat for women in Provincial Assembly of Balochistan after the 2024 Balochistan provincial election as part of the reserved quota for Pakistan People’s Party Parliamentarians.
