= PB-47 Pishin-I =

Constituency of the Provincial Assembly of Balochistan, Pakistan

- Constituency for the Provincial Assembly of Balochistan
- Region: Karezat Tehsil and Nana Sahib and Bostan Tehsils of Pishin District

Current constituency
- Party: Muttahida Majlis-e-Amal
- Member: Abdul Wahid Siddique
- Created from: PB-9 Pishin-II

PB-47 Pishin-I ( پی بی-47 پشین-1 ) is a constituency of the Provincial Assembly of Balochistan.

== General elections 2024 ==
Provincial election 2024: PB-47 Pishin-I
Party	Candidate	Votes	%	±%
Independent	Asfand Yar Khan Kakar	21,690	42.49	
JUI (F)	Kamal Ud Din	19,097	37.41	
Independent	Sultan Muhammad Khan	4,953	9.70	
PNAP	Aurangzaib Khan	1,698	3.33	
ANP	Abdul Bari	1,044	2.05	
Others	Others (eighteen candidates)	2,566	5.02	
Turnout		53,722	51.58	
Total valid votes		51,048	95.02	
Rejected ballots		2,674	4.98	
Majority		2,593	5.08	
Registered electors		104,156		

== General elections 2013 ==
Provincial election 2013: PB-8 Pishin-I

Party	Candidate	Votes
PKMAP	Agha Syed Liaqat Ali	13,741
JUI-F	Syed Mateeullah Agha	12,036
ANP	Haji Abdul Bari Kakar	1,765
JUI-N	Molana Habibullah	957
PML-N	Attaullah Khan Kakar	480
PTI	Asghar Khan Kakar	414
MDM	Mufty Syed Samiullah Haderi	336
Independent	Hayatullah Khan	259

== General elections 2008 ==
Contesting candidates	Party affiliation	Votes polled

== See also ==
- PB-46 Quetta-IX
- PB-48 Pishin-II
