= Umm Kulsoom =

Member of the Provincial Assembly of Balochistan (2024–2029)

- اُم کلثوم

Member of the Provincial Assembly of Balochistan
- Constituency: Reserved seat for women

Personal details
- Party: National Party

Umm Kulsoom (Urdu: اُم کلثوم) is a Pakistani politician who is member of the Provincial Assembly of Balochistan.

== Political career ==
Umm Kulsoom was allotted a reserved seat for women in Provincial Assembly of Balochistan after the 2024 Balochistan provincial election as part of the reserved quota for National Party.
