= PB-34 Nushki =

Constituency of the Provincial Assembly of Balochistan, Pakistan

- Constituency for the Provincial Assembly of Balochistan
- Region: Nushki District

Current constituency
- Party: Jamiat Ulema-e-Islam
- Member: Haji Ghulam Dastagir Badeni
- Created from: PB-40 Chagai-II

PB-34 Nushki (پی بی-34 نوشکی) is a constituency of the Provincial Assembly of Balochistan.

== General elections 2024 ==
Provincial election 2024: PB-34 Nushki
Party	Candidate	Votes	%	±%
JUI (F)	Haji Ghulam Dastagir Badeni	17,218	38.36	
BNP (M)	Mohammad Rahim	15,691	34.96	
PPP	Aurang Zaib	7,431	16.56	
NP	Ghulam Farooq	1,167	2.60	
Others	Others (fifteen candidates)	3,374	7.52	
Turnout		46,359	42.95	
Total valid votes		44,881	96.81	
Rejected ballots		1,478	3.19	
Majority		1,527	3.40	
Registered electors		107,948		

== See also ==
- PB-33 Kharan
- PB-35 Surab
