= Syed Zafar Ali Agha =

Pakistani politician

Member of the Provincial Assembly of Balochistan
- Incumbent
- Assumed office 29 February 2024
- Constituency: PB-49 Pishin-III

Personal details
- Born: Pishin District, Balochistan, Pakistan
- Political party: JUI (F) (2024-present)

Sardar Syed Zafar Ali Agha is a Pakistani politician from Pishin District who has been a member of the Provincial Assembly of Balochistan since February 2024.

== Career ==
He contested the 2024 general elections as a JUI-F candidate from PB-49 Pishin-III and secured 13,811 votes. The runner-up was Agha Syed Liaqat Ali of PKMAP who secured 12,778 votes.
