= PB-50 Killa Abdullah =

Constituency of the Provincial Assembly of Balochistan, Pakistan

PB-50 KiIla Abdullah
- Constituency for the Provincial Assembly of Balochistan
- Region: Killa Abdullah District

Current constituency
- Party: Awami National Party
- Member: Zmrak Khan
- Created from: PB-13 KiIla Abdullah-III

PB-50 KiIla Abdullah (پی بی-50 قلعہ عبداللہ)is a constituency of the Provincial Assembly of Balochistan.

== By-election 2024 ==
2024 Pakistani by-elections: PB-50 Killa Abdullah
Party	Candidate	Votes	%	±%
ANP	Zmarak Khan Achakzai	72,032	55.22	
PMAP	Mir Wais Khan Achakzai	57,132	43.80	
Others	Others (twenty one candidates)	1,281	0.98	
Turnout		130,816	79.65	
Total valid votes		130,445	99.72	
Rejected ballots		371	0.28	
Majority		14,900	11.42	
Registered electors		163,753		

== General elections 2024 ==
General election 2024: PB-50 Killa Abdullah
Party	Candidate	Votes	%	±%
ANP	Zmarak Khan Achakzai	44,712	33.47	
JUI (F)	Muhammad Nawaz Khan Kakar	43,445	32.52	
PMAP	Mir Wais Khan Achakzai	34,604	25.90	
Independent	Zakir Ullah Khan Tareen (Note: Filed nomination papers as PTI candidate but ECP allowed to run as an independent)	6,477	4.85	
Independent	Muhammad Afzal	1,743	1.30	
Independent	Muhammad Zaman Khan	1,550	1.16	
Others	Others (seventeen candidates)	1,060	0.79	
Turnout		134,262	81.99	
Total valid votes		133,591	99.50	
Rejected ballots		671	0.50	
Majority		1,267	0.95	
Registered electors		163,753		

== General elections 2013 ==
Contesting candidates	Party affiliation	Votes polled

== General elections 2008 ==
Contesting candidates	Party affiliation	Votes polled

== See also ==
- PB-48 Pishin-III
- PB-51 Chaman
