= PB-49 Pishin-III =

Constituency of the Provincial Assembly of Balochistan in Pakistan

- Constituency for the Provincial Assembly of Balochistan
- Region: Saranan, Huramzai and Pishin Tehsil (partly) of Pishin District

Current constituency
- Party: Muttahida Majlis-e-Amal
- Member: Syed Azizullah
- Created from: PB-8 Pishin-I

PB-49 Pishin-III (پی بی-49 پشین-3)is a constituency of the Provincial Assembly of Balochistan.

== General elections 2024 ==
Provincial election 2024: PB-49 Pishin-III
Party	Candidate	Votes	%	±%
JUI (F)	Syed Zafar Ali Agha	13,816	33.50	
PMAP	Agha Syed Liaqat Ali	12,780	30.99	
Independent	Abdul Rahoof	5,398	13.09	
Independent	Syed Abdul Hai (Note: Filed nomination papers as PTI candidate but ECP allowed him to run as an Independent)	3,329	8.07	
PNAP	Syed Fida Muhammad	2,128	5.16	
Independent	Syed Abdul Baseer	1,524	3.70	
PPP	Syed Jamal Abdul Nasir	1,326	3.22	
Others	Others (fifteen candidates)	944	2.27	
Turnout		42,226	37.72	
Total valid votes		41,245	97.68	
Rejected ballots		981	2.32	
Majority		1,036	2.51	
Registered electors		111,936		

== General elections 2013 ==
Contesting candidates	Party affiliation	Votes polled

== General elections 2008 ==
Contesting candidates	Party affiliation	Votes polled
Syed Matiullah Agha	Jamiat Ulema-e-Islam (F)	7449
Haji Nizamuddin	Awami National Party	4637
Asmatullah Khan Tareen	Pakistan Muslim League	2065
Syed Habibullah	Independent	1814

== See also ==
- PB-48 Pishin-II
- PB-50 Killa Abdullah
