= PB-28 Kech-IV =

Constituency of the Provincial Assembly of Balochistan, Pakistan

- Constituency for the Provincial Assembly of Balochistan
- Region: Buleda, Zamoran, Hoshab and Turbat (partly) of Kech District

Current constituency
- Party: Pakistan People's Party
- Member: Mir Asghar Rind
- Created from: PB-48 (Kech-I)
- Replaced by: PB-45 Kech I

PB-28 Kech-IV (پی بی-28 کیچ-4) is a constituency of the Provincial Assembly of Balochistan.

== General elections 2024 ==
Provincial election 2024: PB-28 Kech-IV
Party	Candidate	Votes	%	±%
PPP	Mir Asghar Rind	5,450	43.01	
NP	Mir Hammal Khan	4,667	36.83	
BAP	Akbar Askani	2,139	16.88	
Others	Others (thirteen candidates)	417	3.28	
Turnout		13,116	21.95	
Total valid votes		12,673	96.62	
Rejected ballots		443	3.38	
Majority		783	6.18	
Registered electors		59,742		

== See also ==
- PB-27 Kech-III
- PB-29 Panjgur-I
