= Mir Ziaullah Langau =

Pakistani politician

Mir Ziaullah langau

Provincial Minister of Balochistan for Home and Tribal Affairs
- Incumbent
- Assumed office 18 March 2026
- Chief Minister: Sarfraz Bugti
- In office 19 April 2024 – 22 August 2024
- Chief Minister: Sarfraz Bugti
- In office 25 December 2018 – 24 October 2021
- Chief Minister: Jam Kamal Khan

Provincial Minister of Balochistan for Forest and Wildlife
- In office 27 August 2018 – 25 December 2018
- Chief Minister: Jam Kamal Khan

Member of the Provincial Assembly of the Balochistan
- Incumbent
- Assumed office 13 March 2026
- Constituency: PB-36 Kalat
- In office 29 February 2024 – 22 August 2024
- Constituency: PB-36 Kalat
- In office 13 August 2018 – 12 August 2023
- Constituency: PB-37 Kalat

Personal details
- Party: BAP (2018-present)

Mir Ziaullah Langau is a Pakistani politician who is the Minister of Home and Tribal Affairs for Balochistan. He was the Provincial Minister of Balochistan for Forest and Wildlife, in office from 30 August 2018 till 12 August 2023, and a member of the Provincial Assembly of Balochistan during roughly the same period.

== Early life ==
He was born on 15 October 1981.

== Political career ==
He was elected to the Provincial Assembly of the Balochistan as a candidate of Balochistan Awami Party (BAP) from Constituency PB-37 (Kalat) in the 2018 Pakistani general election.

On 27 August 2018, he was inducted into the provincial Balochistan cabinet of Chief Minister of Jam Kamal Khan. On 30 August, he was appointed as Provincial Minister of Balochistan for Forest and Wildlife. After a cabinet shuffle, he was given the portfolio for Home and Tribal Affairs.

He contested the 2024 Balochistan provincial election from PB-36 Kalat as a candidate of BAP and was initially declared the winner.

On 19 April 2024, he was sworn into the Sarfraz Bugti ministry as the Minister for Home and Tribal Affairs.

Subsequently, Mir Saeed Ahmed Langau, the runner-up, filed a petition alleging electoral irregularities. Based on this petition, on 22 August 2024, the Election Tribunal suspended Langau's victory notification and ordered re-polling at seven polling stations. Later, the Election Commission of Pakistan also suspended its earlier notification declaring him as the returned candidate.

Following re-polling that was held at seven polling stations on 10 March 2026, Langau was announced as the returned candidate. He took oath as a member of the Assembly on 13 March 2026.

On 18 March 2026, he was re-sworn into the Sarfraz Bugti ministry as the Minister for Home and Tribal Affairs.

=== Insurgent attack ===
On 14 August 2026, he survived an attack by gunmen in the Khad Kocha area (which had been under a curfew since 23 July) of Mastung as he was travelling from Kalat to Quetta. Six people, including three police officers, sustained injuries in the attack, while Langau remained "unhurt". The attack came in the backdrop of Independence Day celebrations, with strict security measures in the province and mobile services suspended in various districts.
