= PB-38 Quetta-I =

Constituency of the Provincial Assembly of Balochistan, Pakistan

- Constituency for the Provincial Assembly of Balochistan
- Region: Kuchlak Tehsil of Quetta District

Current constituency
- Party: Awami National Party
- Member: Malik Naeem Khan Bazai
- Created from: PB-6 Quetta-VI (2002-2018); PB-24 Quetta-I (2018-2023)

PB-38 Quetta-I (پی بی-38 کوئٹہ-1) is a constituency of the Provincial Assembly of Balochistan.

== General elections 2024 ==
Provincial election 2024: PB-38 Quetta-I
Party	Candidate	Votes	%	±%
ANP	Malik Naeem Khan Bazai	7,797	30.90	
JUI (F)	Ainullah Shams	6,290	24.93	
PMAP	Ghulam Yaseen Khan	3,205	12.70	
Independent	Abdul Hanan (Note: Filed nomination papers as PTI candidate but ECP allowed him to run as an independent)	2,483	9.84	
PPP	Rehmatullah	1,431	5.67	
Others	Others (twenty candidates)	4,030	15.96	
Turnout		26,255	32.54	
Total valid votes		25,236	96.12	
Rejected ballots		1,019	3.88	
Majority		1,507	5.97	
Registered electors		80,679		

== General elections 2013 ==
Contesting candidates	Party affiliation	Votes polled

== General elections 2008 ==
Contesting candidates	Party affiliation	Votes polled

== See also ==
- PB-37 Mastung
- PB-39 Quetta-II
