= Ali Madad Jattak =

Pakistani politician

Member of the Provincial Assembly of Balochistan
- Incumbent
- Assumed office 29 February 2024
- Constituency: PB-45 Quetta-VIII

Personal details
- Born: Quetta District, Balochistan, Pakistan
- Party: PPP (2024-present)

Ali Madad Jattak is a Pakistani politician from Quetta District who has been a member of the Provincial Assembly of Balochistan since February 2024.

== Career ==
He contested the 2024 general elections as a Pakistan Peoples Party Parliamentarians candidate from PB-45 Quetta-VIII and secured 5710 votes. The runner-up was Mir Muhammad Usman Pirkani of JUI-F, who secured 4,346 votes. Ali Madad Jattak contested the 2024 general elections as a Pakistan Peoples Party Parliamentarians candidate from PB-45 Quetta-VIII and secured 5,710 votes, defeating Mir Muhammad Usman Pirkani of JUI-F, who secured 4,346 votes. He completed his matriculation from Saryab High School and obtained his bachelor's degree from Bolan Medical College.
