= Mir Asghar Rind =

Member of the Provincial Assembly of Balochistan from Kech (2024–2029)

- میر اصغر رِند

Member of the Provincial Assembly of Balochistan
- Incumbent
- Assumed office 29 February 2024
- Constituency: PB-28 Kech-IV

Personal details
- Party: PPP (2024-present)

Mir Asghar Rind (Urdu: میر اصغر رِند) is a Pakistani politician who is member of the Provincial Assembly of Balochistan.

== Political career ==
Rind won the 2024 Balochistan provincial election from PB-28 Kech-IV as a Pakistan People’s Party Parliamentarians candidate. He received 7,090 votes while runner up Mir Hammal of Balochistan National Party (Mengal) received 4,366 votes.
