= Farah Azeem Shah =

Member of the Provincial Assembly of Balochistan (2024–2029)

- فرح عظیم شاہ

Member of the Provincial Assembly of Balochistan
- Incumbent
- Assumed office 29 February 2024
- Constituency: Reserved seat for women

Personal details
- Party: BAP (2024-present)

Farah Azeem Shah (Urdu: فرح عظیم شاہ) is a Pakistani politician who is member of the Provincial Assembly of Balochistan.

== Political career ==
Farah was allotted a reserved seat for women in Provincial Assembly of Balochistan after the 2024 Balochistan provincial election as part of the reserved quota for Balochistan Awami Party.
