= PB-39 Quetta-II =

Constituency of the Provincial Assembly of Balochistan, Pakistan

- Constituency for the Provincial Assembly of Balochistan
- Region: Quetta City area of Quetta District

Current constituency
- Party: Muttahida Majlis-e-Amal
- Member: Malik Sikandar Khan
- Created from: PB-1 Quetta-I (2002-2018); PB-25 Quetta-II (2018-2023)

PB-39 Quetta-II (پی بی-39 کوئٹہ-2) is a constituency of the Provincial Assembly of Balochistan.

== General elections 2024 ==
Provincial election 2024: PB-39 Quetta-II
Party	Candidate	Votes	%	±%
Independent	Bakht Muhammad Kakar	7,687	22.65	
JUI (F)	Syed Abdul Wahid	6,194	18.25	
Independent	Noor Muhammad (Note: Filed nomination papers as PTI candidate but ECP allowed him to run as an Independent)	4,920	14.49	
PMAP	Gul Khan	2,595	7.64	
PPP	Muhammad Shareef	2,085	6.14	
Independent	Muhammad Mobeen Khan	1,442	4.25	
Independent	Malik Abdullah Khan	1,402	4.13	
PNAP	Muhammad Ibrahim	1,228	3.62	
Others	Others (thirty four candidates)	6,393	18.83	
Turnout		34,812	35.96	
Total valid votes		33,946	97.51	
Rejected ballots		866	2.49	
Majority		1,493	4.40	
Registered electors		96,808		

== General elections 2013 ==
Contesting candidates	Party affiliation	Votes polled

== General elections 2008 ==
Contesting candidates	Party affiliation	Votes polled

== See also ==
- PB-38 Quetta-I
- PB-40 Quetta-III
