= Constituency PB-17 (Loralai) =

Constituency of the Provincial Assembly of Balochistan, Pakistan

PB-17 (Loralai)
- Constituency for the Provincial Assembly of Balochistan

Current constituency

PB-17 (Loralai) is a constituency of the Provincial Assembly of Balochistan.

== General elections 2013 ==
Contesting candidates	Party affiliation	Votes polled

== General elections 2008 ==
Contesting candidates	Party affiliation	Votes polled

== See also ==
- Balochistan
- Provincial Assembly of Balochistan
