= PB-51 Chaman =

Constituency of the Provincial Assembly of Balochistan, Pakistan

- Constituency for the Provincial Assembly of Balochistan
- Region: Chaman District

Current constituency
- Seats: 1
- Party: Vacant
- Member: Vacant
- Created from: PB-12 Killa Abdullah-II

PB-51 Chaman (پی بی-51 چمن) is a constituency of the Provincial Assembly of Balochistan.

== General elections 2024 ==
Provincial election 2024: PB-51 Chaman
Party	Candidate	Votes	%	±%
Independent	Abdul Khaliq Khan Achakzai	20,659	25.89	
ANP	Asghar Khan Achakzai	19,974	25.03	
PMAP	Abasin Khan Achakzai	18,108	22.69	
JUI (F)	Ghousullah	13,445	16.85	
Mazloom Olsi Tehreek Pakistan	Muhammad Sadiq S/O Muhammad Anwar	4,574	5.73	
Others	Others (twenty four candidates)	3,042	3.81	
Turnout		79,802	41.12	
Total valid votes		79,802	100	
Rejected ballots		0	0	
Majority		685	0.86	
Registered electors		194,081		

== General elections 2013 ==
Contesting candidates	Party affiliation	Votes polled

== General elections 2008 ==
Contesting candidates	Party affiliation	Votes polled

== See also ==
- PB-50 Killa Abdullah
- PB-1 Sherani-cum-Zhob
