= Saifullah Khan Paracha =

Baloch politician (1931–2021)

- Urdu: سیف اللہ خان پراچہ

Member of the Quetta Metropolitan Corporation (QMC)

Member of the West Pakistan Assembly

Member of the Balochistan Assembly

Member of the Senate of Pakistan

Member of the Balochistan Assembly

Member of the Senate of Pakistan

Personal details
- Party: Pakistan Peoples Party

Saifullah Khan Paracha (Urdu: سیف اللہ خان پراچہ; born 17 July 1931 – 14 July 2021) was a Pakistani professional engineer, businessman and politician from Balochistan.

== Personal life ==
Paracha was born on July 17, 1931, in Makhad, Attock District, Balochistan, Pakistan. After completing his school at Aitchison College in Lahore, he went to the United States, where he earned a B.S. in Mechanical and Mining Engineering from the University of California, Berkeley, in 1954.

He was the President of Dar ul Falah, orphanage, Anjuman-e-Islamia, Quetta, NGO and Pakistan Institution of Engineers Balochistan.

The Early Eocene Quettacyon parachai (Condylarthra) from the Ghazij Formation of Balochistan, Pakistan is named after him.

== Career ==
During his political career, Saifullah Khan Paracha, served as a member of Municipal Corporation Quetta, West Pakistan Assembly, Balochistan Assembly and Senate of Pakistan.

From 1983 to 1984, Paracha served as the president of the Federation of Pakistan Chambers of Commerce & Industry.
