= Hadiya Nawaz =

Member of the Provincial Assembly of Balochistan (2024–2029)

- ہادیہ نواز

Member of the Provincial Assembly of Balochistan
- Incumbent
- Assumed office 29 February 2024
- Constituency: Reserved seat for women

Personal details
- Party: PMLN (2024-present)

Hadiya Nawaz (Urdu: ہادیہ نواز) is a Pakistani politician who is member of the Provincial Assembly of Balochistan.

== Political career ==
Hadiya was allotted a reserved seat for women in Provincial Assembly of Balochistan after the 2024 Balochistan provincial election as part of the reserved quota for Pakistan Muslim League (N).
