= Salma Bibi =

Member of the Provincial Assembly of Balochistan (2024–2029)

- سلمٰی بی بی

Member of the Provincial Assembly of Balochistan
- Incumbent
- Assumed office 29 February 2024
- Constituency: Reserved seat for women

Personal details
- Party: ANP (2024-present)

Salma Bibi (Urdu: سلمٰی بی بی) is a Pakistani politician who is member of the Provincial Assembly of Balochistan.

== Political career ==
Salma was allotted a reserved seat for women in Provincial Assembly of Balochistan after the 2024 Balochistan provincial election as part of the reserved quota for Awami National Party.
