= PB-48 Pishin-II =

Constituency of the Provincial Assembly of Balochistan, Pakistan

- Constituency for the Provincial Assembly of Balochistan
- Region: Pishin City and Tehsil area in Pishin District

Current constituency
- Party: Muttahida Majlis-e-Amal
- Member: Asghar Ali Tareen
- Created from: PB-10 Pishin-III

PB-48 Pishin-II (پی بی-48 پشین-2) is a constituency of the Provincial Assembly of Balochistan.

== General elections 2024 ==
Provincial election 2024: PB-48 Pishin-II
Party	Candidate	Votes	%	±%
JUI (F)	Asghar Ali Tareen	17,945	42.81	
PMAP	Sardar Amjad Khan	15,049	35.90	
Independent	Syed Shah Nawaz Kiral (Note: Filed nomination papers as PTI candidate but ECP allowed him to run as an Independent)	3,472	8.28	
PNAP	Muhammad Essa Khan	2,878	6.87	
Others	Others (twenty two candidates)	2,575	6.14	
Turnout		42,798	43.10	
Total valid votes		41,919	97.95	
Rejected ballots		879	2.05	
Majority		2,896	6.91	
Registered electors		99,307		

== General elections 2013 ==
Contesting candidates	Party affiliation	Votes polled

== General elections 2008 ==
Contesting candidates	Party affiliation	Votes polled
Syed Hanif Shah	Anp	7000

== See also ==
- PB-47 Pishin-I
- PB-49 Pishin-III
