= Bakht Muhammad Kakar =

Pakistani politician

Member of the Provincial Assembly of Balochistan
- Incumbent
- Assumed office 29 February 2024
- Constituency: PB-39 Quetta-II

Personal details
- Born: Quetta District, Balochistan, Pakistan
- Party: PMLN (2024-present)

Bakht Muhammad Kakar is a Pakistani politician from Quetta District. He is currently serving as a Provincial Minister for Health Balochistan Provincial Assembly of Balochistan since September 2024. Earlier He held the Ministry of Livestock and Dairy Development Balochistan since February 2024 till 20 September 2024.

== Career ==
He contested the 2024 general elections as an independent candidate from PB-39 Quetta-II. He secured 6618 votes while his runner-up was Syed Abdul Wahid of JUI-F who secured 5878 votes.
