= PB-36 Kalat =

Constituency of the Provincial Assembly of Balochistan, Pakistan

- Constituency for the Provincial Assembly of Balochistan
- Region: Kalat District

Current constituency
- Member: Vacant
- Created from: PB-36 Kalat-I

PB-36 Kalat (پی بی-36 قلات) is a constituency of the Provincial Assembly of Balochistan.

== General elections 2024 ==
Provincial elections were held on 8 February 2024. Mir Ziaullah Langau won the election with 14,281 votes.

Provincial election 2024: PB-36 Kalat
Party	Candidate	Votes	%	±%
BAP	Mir Ziaullah Langau	14,281	34.43	
JUI (F)	Mir Saeed Ahmed Langove	11,064	26.67	
PPP	Sardarzada Muhammad Naeem	6,014	14.50	
BNP (M)	Mir Qadir Bakhsh	5,836	14.07	
NP	Muhammad Yaqoob	1,773	4.27	
Others	Others (thirty one candidates)	2,511	6.05	
Turnout		44,164	41.09	
Total valid votes		41,479	93.92	
Rejected ballots		2,685	6.08	
Majority		3,217	7.76	
Registered electors		107,475		

A re-poll on 7 polling stations was to be held due to an order by an election tribunal, which suspended the victory of Mir Ziaullah Langau. However, the Election Commission of Pakistan postponed the re-poll due to the "prevailing law and order situation" in the constituency. The re-poll will now be held on 9 February 2025. This was also postponed. The re-poll was held on 10 March 2026, and Mir Ziaullah Langau was again returned as the victor.

== See also ==
- PB-35 Surab
- PB-37 Mastung
