= Abdul Rehman Khetran =

Pakistani politician

Sardar Abdul Rehman Khetran

Public Health Engineering Minister of Balochistan
- In office 20 April 2024 – 6 July 2026

Food and Population Welfare Minister of Balochistan
- In office 9 September 2019 – 12 August 2023

Science and Technology Minister of Balochistan
- In office 2018–2019

Member of the Provincial Assembly of Balochistan
- Incumbent
- Assumed office 28 February 2024
- Constituency: PB-8 Barkhan
- In office 2018–2023
- Constituency: PB-8 Barkhan
- In office 2013–2018
- Constituency: PB-8 Barkhan
- In office 1997–1999
- Constituency: PB-8 Barkhan

Personal details
- Born: 20 December 1958 (age 67) Barkhan District, Balochistan, Pakistan
- Party: PMLN (2023-present)
- Other political affiliations: BAP (2018-2023); JUI (F) (2013-2018); PML(Q) (2002-2012); PMLN (1997-1999); PPP (1993-1996); JWP (1988-1993)
- Relations: Anwar Jan Khetran (paternal uncle)
- Education: Matriculation

Abdul Rehman Khetran is a Pakistani politician who had been the Provincial Minister of Balochistan from 9 September 2018 to 12 August 2023. He has been a member of the Provincial Assembly of Balochistan from August 2018 to August 2023.

Previously, he was a member of the Provincial Assembly of Balochistan from May 2013 to May 2018.

== Early life and education ==
He was born on 20 December 1958 in Barkhan District.

He is a Matriculate.

== Political career ==
He was elected to the Provincial Assembly of Balochistan as a candidate of Jamiat Ulema-e Islam (F) from Constituency PB-17 Barkhan in the 2013 Pakistani general election.

He was re-elected to Provincial Assembly of Balochistan as an independent candidate from Constituency PB-8 (Barkhan) in the 2018 Pakistani general election as an independent candidate. He later joined Balochistan Awami Party and currently serving as its spokesperson.

On 8 September 2018, he was inducted into the provincial Balochistan cabinet of Chief Minister Jam Kamal Khan. On 9 September, he was appointed as Provincial Minister of Balochistan for Science and Information Technology.

== Controversy ==
=== Barkhan triple murder incident ===
On 21 February 2023, Khetran was accused in a triple murder incident. At least three dead bodies were recovered in the country’s southwestern region including a woman from a well in Barkhan district on Monday, the corpses were found in a well located in Mir Haji Kot village of Balochistan where area residents informed the officials about the gut-wrenching incident, prompting a strong reaction from the police team and causing outrage on social media, As the incident garnered attention and victims started sharing clips on social media, the incident along with the Khetran started to trend on social media, the victims including a mother and her children were held hostage in an unlawful personal jail of Abdul Rahman Khetran. The Balochistan law enforcers told media that the corpses of Mohammad Marri’s wife and two sons were recovered the three of them are members of a family of the Marri tribe, and the bodies of three victims were sent to Quetta from Kohlu District. Residents hit the streets in protest against the Khetran for the alleged killing the protests spreads across Pakistan in demand to arrest Khetran. Amid the serious accusations Khetran denied the involvement in murder and distanced himself from the heinous killing and called it a conspiracy of his rivals He accused his son to hatch a conspiracy against him to take over the family politics, However many reports highlighted that Khetran had a long history of being accused for kidnapping and killing his enemies, he was previously booked in cases having serious charges including murder, kidnapping, sexual assault, and land grabbing, but he remained free due to his connections. On 22 February 2023, the police arrested Khetran for his alleged role in triple murder after widespread protests and outrage of incident on social media. Amid the condemnations, the Human Rights Commission of Pakistan strongly denounced the tragic incident, calling it horrifying.
