= PB-43 Quetta-VI =

Constituency of the Provincial Assembly of Balochistan, Pakistan

- Constituency for the Provincial Assembly of Balochistan
- Region: Quetta Cantonment and City area of Quetta District

Current constituency
- Party: Pakistan Tehreek-e-Insaf
- Member: Muhammad Mobeen Khan
- Created from: PB-4 Quetta-IV (2002-2018); PB-28 Quetta-V (2018-2023)

PB-43 Quetta-VI (پی بی-43 کوئٹہ-6) is a constituency of the Provincial Assembly of Balochistan.

== General elections 2024 ==
Provincial election 2024: PB-43 Quetta-VI
Party	Candidate	Votes	%	±%
Independent	Mir Liaquat Ali Lehri	7,277	16.80	
Independent	Sardar Douda Khan (Note: Filed nomination papers as PTI candidate but ECP allowed him to run as an Independent)	5,190	11.98	
PMAP	Muhammad Idrees Barrech	4,151	9.58	
BNP (M)	Akhtar Hussain Langove	3,529	8.15	
JUI (F)	Mohib Ullah S/O Muhammad Rafiq	3,379	7.80	
PPP	Hasnain Hashmi	2,559	5.91	
PML(N)	Naseem Ur Rehman Khan	2,418	5.58	
Independent	Sheryar Khan	2,141	4.94	
Independent	Muhammad Saleem	1,960	4.53	
BAP	Fojan	1,753	4.05	
Independent	Muhammad Ismail	1,651	3.81	
Independent	Khan Muhammad	1,603	3.70	
PNAP	Rozi Khan Barrech	1,279	2.95	
Others	Others (thirty four candidates)	4,421	10.22	
Turnout		44,225	31.17	
Total valid votes		43,311	97.93	
Rejected ballots		914	2.07	
Majority		2,087	4.82	
Registered electors		141,904		

== General elections 2013 ==
Contesting candidates	Party affiliation	Votes polled

== General elections 2008 ==
Contesting candidates	Party affiliation	Votes polled

== See also ==
- PB-42 Quetta-V
- PB-44 Quetta-VII
