= Khalil Dummar =

Pakistani politician

Member of the Provincial Assembly of Balochistan
- In office March 2017 – 31 May 2018

Personal details
- Born: 3 June 1988 (age 38)
- Party: PTI (2025-present)
- Other political affiliations: JUI (F) (2018-2025)

Khalil Ur Rehman Dummar is a Pakistani politician who was a Member of the Provincial Assembly of Balochistan, from May 2013 to May 2018.

== Early life ==
He was born on 3 June 1988 to Gul Muhammad Dummar.

== Political career ==
He was elected to the Provincial Assembly of Balochistan as a candidate of Jamiat Ulema-e Islam (F) from Constituency PB-7 Ziarat in by-election held in March 2017. He received 13,774 votes and defeated a candidate of Pakistan Tehreek-e-Insaf.
