= PB-24 Gwadar =

Constituency of the Provincial Assembly of Balochistan, Pakistan

- Provincial constituency for the Provincial Assembly of Balochistan
- Region: Gwadar District

Current constituency
- Party: Haq Do Tehreek Balochistan
- Member: Hidayat ur Rehman Baloch
- Created from: PB-51 (Gawadar)

PB-24 Gwadar (پی بی-24 گوادر) is a constituency of the Provincial Assembly of Balochistan.

== Election 2024 ==
Provincial election 2024: PB-24 Gwadar
Party	Candidate	Votes	%	±%
HDTB	Hidayat Ur Rehman Baloch	20,929	41.64	
BNP (M)	Mir Hamal Kalmati	16,523	32.87	
Independent	Syed Moheem Jan	7,280	14.48	
NP	Ashraf	3,517	7.00	
PPP	Basheer Ahmed	1,387	2.76	
Others	Others (eight candidates)	631	1.25	
Turnout		52,761	37.97	
Total valid votes		50,267	95.27	
Rejected ballots		2,494	4.73	
Majority		4,406	8.77	
Registered electors		138,952		

== See also ==
- PB-23 Awaran
- PB-25 Kech-I
