= PB-5 Loralai =

Constituency of the Provincial Assembly of Balochistan, Pakistan

- Constituency for the Provincial Assembly of Balochistan
- Region: Loralai District

Current constituency
- Party: Pakistan Muslim League (N)
- Member: Muhammad Khan Toor Utmankhel
- Created from: PB-16 (Loralai-III)

PB-5 Loralai (پی بی-5 لورالائی) is a constituency of the Provincial Assembly of Balochistan in Pakistan.

== General elections 2024 ==
Provincial election 2024: PB-5 Loralai
Party	Candidate	Votes	%	±%
PML(N)	Muhammad Khan Toor Utmankhel	16,012	29.12	
JUI (F)	Molvi Faizullah	12,562	22.85	
PPP	Shams Ud Din S/O Murtaza Khan	11,427	20.79	
Independent	Abdul Hassan (Note: Filed nomination papers as PTI candidate but ECP allowed him to run as an independent)	4,532	8.24	
PNAP	Mustafa Shah	3,131	5.70	
PMAP	Ali Safdar Muhammad	2,155	3.92	
ANP	Atta Muhammad Gull	1,840	3.35	
Others	Others (twenty one candidates)	3,319	6.04	
Turnout		56,813	47.76	
Total valid votes		54,978	96.77	
Rejected ballots		1,835	3.23	
Majority		3,450	6.27	
Registered electors		118,949		

== General elections 2008 ==
Contesting candidates	Party affiliation	Votes polled

== See also ==
- PB-4 Musakhel-cum-Barkhan
- PB-6 Duki
