= Sanaullah Baloch =

Pakistani politician

Sana Ullah Baloch
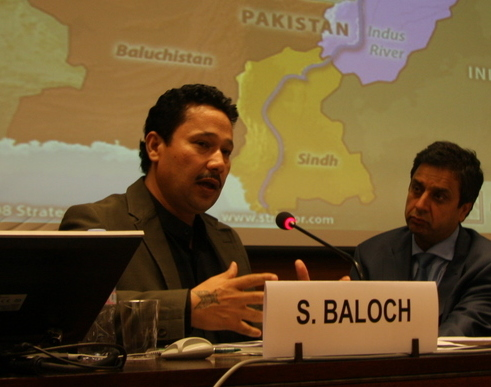

Member of the Provincial Assembly of Balochistan
- In office 2018–2023
- Governor: Amanullah Khan Yasinzai

Member of the Senate of Pakistan
- In office 2003–2009

Member of the National Assembly of Pakistan
- In office 1997–1999

Personal details
- Profession: Governance Expert, Parliamentarian, Researcher, Writer, Author,
- Website: Official website

Sanaullah Baloch (Urdu: ثناء اللہ بلوچ) is a Baloch nationalist leader from the Balochistan National Party (Mengal) (BNP-M). He is a former member of the Provincial Assembly of Balochistan from 2018 to 2023, Senate of Pakistan from 2003 to 2009 and National Assembly of Pakistan from 1997 to 1999.

In 2005, he was a participant at Stanford University's Draper Hills Summer Fellows on Democracy and Development at Stanford's CDDRL.

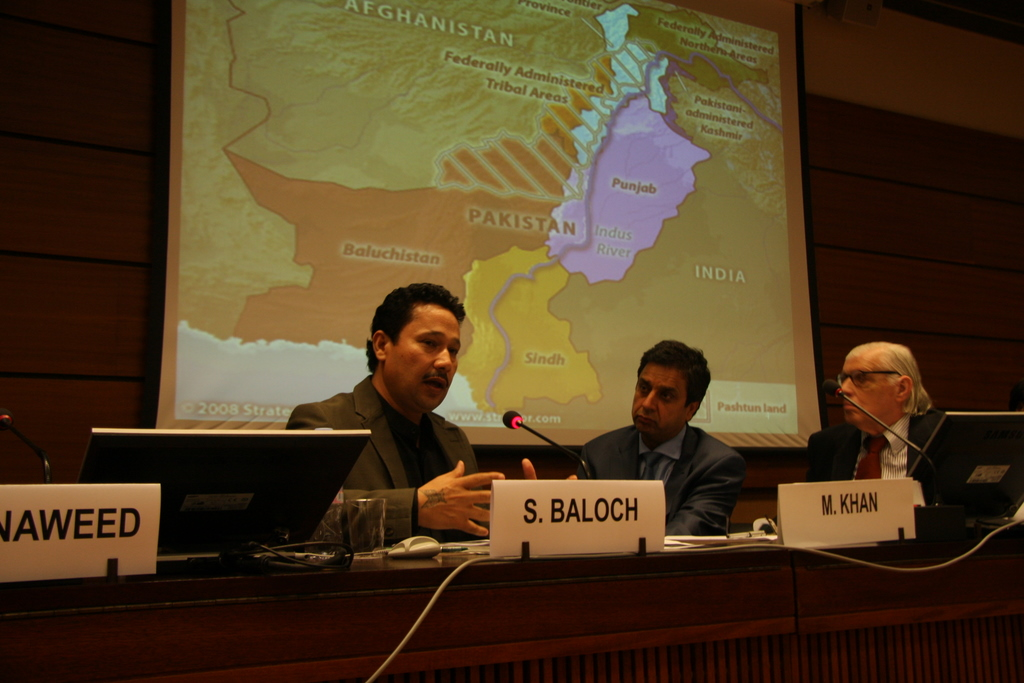
Mr. Baloch speaking to a Seminar on Minority Rights Pakistan

He contributed articles on ethnic politics, democracy, and nationalism. He mostly writes and speaks at national and international forums on the issue of ethnic politics in Pakistan. His first book was published in 2001. He has written, mainly about the politics and society of Balochistan, Pakistan in several leading South Asian English language newspapers and magazines, including Dawn, and The News.

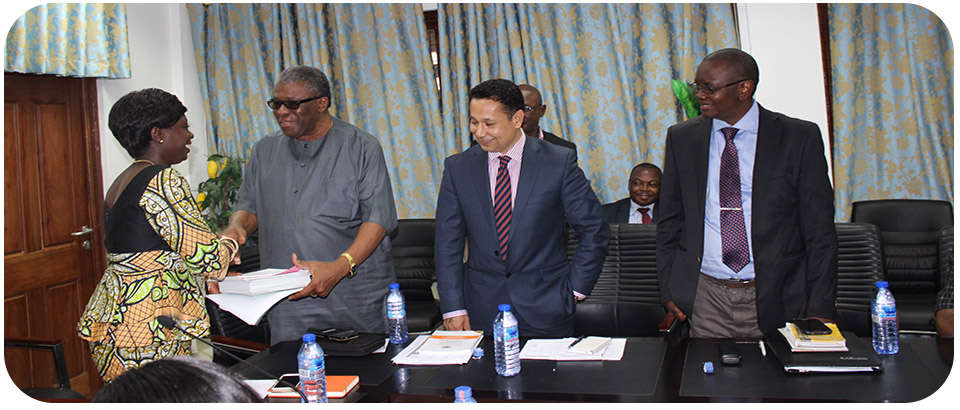
Mr. Baloch and CRC Sierra Leone Chairman and Members on a visit to Ghana meeting Senior Ministers, exchange ideas on Constitutional Reforms and Experiences
