= PB-6 Duki =

Constituency of the Provincial Assembly of Balochistan, Pakistan

- Constituency for the Provincial Assembly of Balochistan
- Region: Duki District

Current constituency
- Party: Balochistan Awami Party
- Member: Sardar Masood Ali Khan Luni
- Created from: PB-15 (Loralai-II)

PB-6 Duki (پی بی-6 دوکی) is a constituency of the Provincial Assembly of Balochistan.

== General elections 2024 ==
Provincial election 2024: PB-6 Duki
| Party | Candidate | Votes | % | ±% |
|---|---|---|---|---|
| PML(N) | Sardar Masood Ali Khan Luni | 10,862 | 21.88 | |
| Independent | Sardar Muhammad Anwar Khan Nasar | 10,037 | 20.22 | |
| JUI (F) | Yahya Khan Nasir | 8,332 | 16.79 | |
| Independent | Azam Khan Tareen | 7,304 | 14.71 | |
| PMAP | Sardar Muhammad Shafiq Tareen | 7,097 | 14.30 | |
| IPP | Yahya Khan | 1,891 | 3.81 | |
| Independent | Muhammad Ashraf (Note: Filed nomination papers as PTI candidate but ECP allowed him to run as an independent) | 1,331 | 2.68 | |
| Others | Others (thirty four candidates) | 2,787 | 5.61 | |
| Turnout | | 50,993 | 78.78 | |
| Total valid votes | | 49,641 | 97.35 | |
| Rejected ballots | | 1,352 | 2.65 | |
| Majority | | 825 | 1.66 | |
| Registered electors | | 64,728 | | |

== General elections 2018 ==
| Contesting candidates | Party affiliation | Votes polled |

== General elections 2013 ==
| Contesting candidates | Party affiliation | Votes polled |

== General elections 2008 ==
| Contesting candidates | Party affiliation | Votes polled |

== See also ==
- PB-5 Loralai
- PB-7 Ziarat cum Harnai
