= PB-37 Mastung =

Constituency of the Provincial Assembly of Balochistan, Pakistan

- Constituency for the Provincial Assembly of Balochistan
- Region: Mastung District

Current constituency
- Party: Independent
- Member: Aslam Raisani
- Created from: PB-38 Mastung

PB-37 Mastung (پی بی-37 مستونگ) is a constituency of the Provincial Assembly of Balochistan.

== General elections 2024 ==
Provincial election 2024: PB-37 Mastung
Party	Candidate	Votes	%	±%
JUI (F)	Aslam Raisani	13,675	32.45	
PPP	Sardar Noor Ahmed Bangulzai	11,428	27.12	
NP	Sardar Kamal Khan Bangulzai	7,026	16.67	
Independent	Nawab Muhammad Khan Shahwani	5,729	13.59	
BNP (M)	Muhammad Asif	1,319	3.13	
JI	Khalil Ur Rehman	1,032	2.45	
Others	Others (fifteen candidates)	1,934	4.59	
Turnout		44,406	32.34	
Total valid votes		42,143	94.90	
Rejected ballots		2,263	5.10	
Majority		2,247	5.33	
Registered electors		137,317		

== See also ==
- PB-36 Kalat
- PB-38 Quetta-I
