= Mir Liaquat Ali Lehri =

Pakistani politician

Member of the Provincial Assembly of Balochistan
- Incumbent
- Assumed office 29 February 2024
- Constituency: PB-43 Quetta-VI

Personal details
- Born: Quetta District, Balochistan, Pakistan
- Party: PPP (2024-present)

Mir Liaquat Ali Lehri, also known as Mir Liaquat Jaan Lehri, is a Pakistani politician from Quetta District who has been a member of the Provincial Assembly of Balochistan since February 2024.

== Career ==
He contested the 2024 general elections as a Pakistan People’s Party candidate from PB-43 Quetta-VI and secured 7,277 votes. The runner-up was Sardar Douda Khan who secured 5,190 votes.
