= Haq Do Tehreek Balochistan =

- Abbreviation: HDTB
- Leader: Hidayat ur Rehman Baloch
- Chairman: Hussain Baloch Wadela
- General Secretary: Hafeez Kiazai
- Spokesperson: Naveed Muhammad
- Founded: 2021; 5 years ago
- Headquarters: Gwadar, Balochistan, Pakistan
- Ideology: Baloch nationalism Regionalism
- National affiliation: TTAP
- Slogan: Unity, Struggle, Democratic Resistance (اتحاد، جدوجہد، جمہوری مزاحمت)
- National Assembly of Pakistan: 0 / 366
- Provincial Assembly of Balochistan: 1 / 65

Website
- haqdotehreek.com

The Haq Do Tehreek, Balochistan (Urdu: حق دو تحریک، بلوچستان, lit. 'Give rights to Balochistan Movement') is a Pakistani political movement and party active in southern Balochistan, mainly in Gwadar. The party's leader is Hidayat ur Rehman Baloch, who is a veteran Balochi nationalist politician from Gwadar. The party is active in southern port areas of Balochistan and protests issues like illegal fishing. The Haq Do Tehreek, Balochistanan was founded in 2021 in a coalition of politicians who advocated for human rights for Baloch people in Pakistan. The party heavily campaigned and won a majority of votes in the 2024 Balochistan provincial elections in the Balochistan provincial assembly seat PB-24. The Haq Do Tehreek also has a somewhat affiliation with the Jamaat-e-Islami Pakistan.

== Ideology ==
The Party's leaders have criticized the Pakistani central and provincial government's decisions of having a “non-serious attitude” to Balochistan's many issues. The Haq Do Tehreek focuses on the four main issues.

- Iran-Pakistan border issues including checkpoints, and Iran-Pakistan border trade
- Security issues (Military involvement in Balochistan)
- Illegal fishing in Balochistan's ports (mainly Gwadar)
- Human rights for Balochis in Gwadar and throughout Pakistan
- China-Pakistan Economic Corridor

The Haq Do Tehreek leader Hidayat ur Rehman Baloch has openly protested against the government of China and Pakistan for their building of the Gwadar port as part of the China-Pakistan Economic Corridor.

The party supports Baloch nationalism and advocates for a greater government focus on the issues of Balochistan. The Haq Do Tehreek's main focus has been diverted to the port of Gwadar, where they have highly advocated for a halt to Illegal fishing and trawling, but they are mostly known for their stance against the China-Pakistan Economic Corridor.

== Electoral performance ==
=== Balochistan Assembly Elections ===
Election	Candidate	Votes	%	Seats	+/–	Result
2024	Hidayat ur Rehman Baloch	20,925	0.92%	1 / 61 PB-24 Gwadar	▲1	Opposition

== See also ==
- List of political parties in Pakistan
- Provincial Assembly of Balochistan
- Gwadar
- Gwadar Port
- Baloch nationalism
- China-Pakistan Economic Corridor
