= Akbar Askani =

Pakistani politician

Mir Akbar Askani

Member of the Provincial Assembly of Balochistan
- In office 13 August 2018 – 12 August 2023
- Constituency: PB-48 Kech-IV
- In office 29 May 2013 – 31 May 2018
- Constituency: PB-50 Kech-III

Personal details
- Born: 1 January 1982 (age 44) Mand (Kech District)
- Party: Balochistan Awami Party (2018-present)
- Other political affiliations: Pakistan Muslim League (N) (2013-2018)
- Relations: Malik Shah Gorgaij (Father-in-law)

Akbar Askani (born 1 January 1982) is a Pakistani politician who has been a Member of the Provincial Assembly of Balochistan from August 2018 to August 2023 and from May 2013 to May 2018.

Askani was elected in 2013 and 2018. In 2013 he participated in the general elections as an affiliate of the Pakistan Muslim League (N) from PB-50 (Mand, Dasht, Tump), and in 2018, he entered the general elections as an affiliate of the Balochistan Awami Party from PB-48 (Tump cum Nasirabad). The Balochistan Awami Party is the ruling party of Balochistan, where the party won majority seats from all over Balochistan and set to form a government with the coalition parties.

In 2013 Askani served the Ministry of Fisheries, Mine, and Natural Resources. He currently only serves the fisheries ministry. He is one of the youngest politicians in Balochistan's political history and has become a member of the Balochistan Assembly.

== Political career ==
He was elected to the Provincial Assembly of Balochistan as a candidate of Pakistan Muslim League (N) (PML-N) from Constituency PB-50 Kech-III in the 2013 Pakistani general election. He received 1,385 votes. In May 2013, he was elected Vice President of PML-N Balochistan.

In December 2014, the Balochistan High Court disqualified him from holding a membership of the Provincial Assembly of Balochistan.

He was re-elected to the Provincial Assembly of Balochistan as a candidate of the Balochistan Awami Party (BAP) from Constituency PB-48 (Kech-IV) in the 2018 Pakistani general election.
