= Zmarak Khan Achakzai =

Pakistani politician

Zmarak Khan Achakzai and Peeralizai

Provincial Minister of Balochistan for Agriculture and Cooperatives
- In office 30 August 2018 – 12 August 2023

Member of the Provincial Assembly of Balochistan
- In office 13 August 2018 – 12 August 2023
- Constituency: PB-21 (Killa Abdullah-I) Tehsil Jangal Bagh
- In office 29 May 2013 – 31 May 2018

Personal details
- Born: 14 August 1962 (age 64) Killa Abdullah District, Balochistan, Pakistan
- Party: ANP (2013-present)

Zmarak Khan Achakzai is a Pakistani politician who was the Provincial Minister of Balochistan for Agriculture and Cooperatives, in office from 30 August 2018 to 12 August 2023. He had been a member of the Provincial Assembly of Balochistan from August 2018 to August 2023 and from May 2013 to May 2018.

== Early life and education ==
He was born on 14 August 1962 in Killa Abdullah District.

He has a degree in Bachelor of Engineering.

== Political career ==
He was elected to the Provincial Assembly of Balochistan as a candidate of Awami National Party (ANP) from Constituency PB-12 Killa Abdullah-II in the 2013 Pakistani general election.

He was re-elected to the Provincial Assembly of Balochistan as a candidate of ANP from Constituency PB-21 (Killa Abdullah-I) in the 2018 Pakistani general election.

On 27 August 2018, he was inducted into the provincial Balochistan cabinet of Chief Minister Jam Kamal Khan. On 30 August, he was appointed as Provincial Minister of Balochistan for Agriculture and cooperatives.
