= Mir Ubaidullah Gorgage =

Pakistani politician

Member of the Provincial Assembly of Balochistan
- Incumbent
- Assumed office 29 February 2024
- Constituency: PB-44 Quetta-VII

Personal details
- Born: Quetta District, Balochistan, Pakistan
- Party: PPP (2024-present)
- Relations: Malik Shah Gorgaij (Father)

Mir Ubaidullah Gorgage is a Pakistani politician from Quetta District. He is currently serving as a member of the Provincial Assembly of Balochistan since February 2024.

== Career ==
He contested the 2024 general elections as a Pakistan People’s Party candidate from PB-44 Quetta-VII. He secured 7125 votes while his runner-up was Atta Muhammad Bungalzai of National Party who secured 6385 votes.
