= PB-35 Surab =

Constituency of the Provincial Assembly of Balochistan, Pakistan

- Constituency for the Provincial Assembly of Balochistan
- Region: Surab District

Current constituency
- Party: Pakistan Tehreek-e-Insaf
- Member: Mir Naimatullah Zehri
- Created from: PB-37 Kalat-II

PB-35 Surab (پی بی-35 سوراب) is a constituency of the Provincial Assembly of Balochistan.

== General elections 2024 ==
Provincial election 2024: PB-35 Surab
Party	Candidate	Votes	%	±%
JUI (F)	Mir Zafarullah Khan Zehri	16,828	55.75	
PML(N)	Mir Naimatullah Zehri	11,274	37.35	
BNP (M)	Abdul Latif	1,016	3.37	
Others	Others (thirteen candidates)	1,065	3.53	
Turnout		32,081	51.30	
Total valid votes		30,183	94.08	
Rejected ballots		1,898	5.92	
Majority		5,554	18.40	
Registered electors		62,531		

== See also ==
- PB-34 Nushki
- PB-36 Kalat
