= Ahmed Ali Kohzad =

Pakistani politician

Ahmed Ali Kohzad احمد علی کوهزاد

HDP General Secretary

HSF member

Personal details
- Born: 16-02-1979 Quetta, Pakistan
- Party: HDP
- Profession: Politician
- Elected Member Balochistan Assembly for period of 2018-2023

Ahmed Ali Kohzad (Urdu: احمد علی کوهزاد) is a prominent Hazara Politician in Quetta Pakistan and General Secretary of Hazara Democratic Party. He has been elected as member of Provincial Assembly of Balochistan from PB-26 (Quetta-III) in the 2018 Pakistani general election. He completed his political science degree from Balochistan University and since then he has been active in politics and a member of Hazara Student Federation.

He is now been directed by Balochistan High Court to approach MOI to clear his Nationality on 07-08-2018.
