= Qadir Nayel =

Pakistani politician

Member of the Provincial Assembly of Balochistan
- In office 3 January 2019 – 12 August 2023
- Constituency: PB-26 (Quetta-III)

Personal details
- Party: HDP (2003-present)

Qadir Nayel is a Pakistani politician who had been member of the Provincial Assembly of Balochistan from January 2018 to August 2023.

== Political career ==
Nayel, a journalist by profession, contested the by-election on 31 December 2018 from constituency PB-26 (Quetta-III) of Provincial Assembly of Balochistan on the ticket of Hazara Democratic Party. He won the election by the majority of 1,015 votes over the runner up Maulana Wali Muhammad Turabi of Muttahida Majlis-e-Amal. He garnered 5,272 votes while Turabi received 4,257 votes.
