= PB-44 Quetta-VII =

Constituency of the Provincial Assembly of Balochistan, Pakistan

- Constituency for the Provincial Assembly of Balochistan
- Region: Quetta City area of Quetta District

Current constituency
- Party: Balochistan National Party (Mengal)
- Member: Ahmed Nawaz Baloch
- Created from: PB-3 Quetta-III (2002-2018); PB-30 Quetta-VII (2018-2023)

PB-44 Quetta-VII (پی بی-44 کوئٹہ-7) is a constituency of the Provincial Assembly of Balochistan.

== General elections 2024 ==
Provincial election 2024: PB-44 Quetta-VII
Party	Candidate	Votes	%	±%
PPP	Mir Ubaidullah Gorgage	8,017	28.14	
NP	Mir Atta Muhammad Bangulzai	6,395	22.45	
BNP (M)	Waheed Ahmed	3,163	11.10	
JUI (F)	Hashmat Ali	3,012	10.57	
Independent	Malik Muhammad Faisal Dehwar (Note: Filed nomination papers as PTI candidate but ECP allowed him to run as an Independent)	2,248	7.89	
PML(N)	Noor Muhammad	1,792	6.29	
PMAP	Syed Abdul Khaliq	1,364	4.79	
Others	Others (eighteen candidates)	2,497	8.77	
Turnout		28,921	33.05	
Total valid votes		28,488	98.50	
Rejected ballots		433	1.50	
Majority		1,622	5.69	
Registered electors		87,495		

== General elections 2013 ==
Contesting candidates	Party affiliation	Votes polled

== General elections 2008 ==
2008 Pakistani general election were held on 18 February 2008.

2008 election results for PB-3 Quetta III
Contesting candidates	Party affiliation	Votes polled
Mohammad Ismail Gujjar	PPP	3202
Mir Liaquat Ali Lehri	Independent	2662

== See also ==
- PB-43 Quetta-VI
- PB-45 Quetta-VIII
