= Hidayat ur Rehman Baloch =

Pakistani politician

Member of the Provincial Assembly of Balochistan
- Incumbent
- Assumed office 28 February 2024
- Constituency: PB-24 Gwadar

Personal details
- Born: Balochistan, Pakistan
- Party: HTDB (2024-present)
- Other political affiliations: JIP (Present)

Maulana Hidayat Rahman Baloch is a Pakistani politician and social activist from Gwadar from Balochistan. He is currently serving as the president of Jamaat-e-Islami Balochistan chapter. Baloch is also known for the Gwadar protest and for his leadership in the Haq Do Tehreek (HDT), a movement advocating for the rights of the people of Gwadar. He was elected to the Provincial Assembly of Balochistan from the Gwadar constituency in 2024.

== Early life ==
Hidayat ur Rehman Baloch was born and grew up in Surbandan, a small coastal town in Gwadar District.

== Career ==
In the 2024 election, Maulana Hidayat-ur-Rehman contested the Provincial Assembly of Balochistan seat PB-24 Gwadar. He won the election by securing 20,925 votes.

=== Leadership in Haq Do Tehreek (HDT) ===
As the head of Gwadar Rights Movement (GRM), also known as Haq Do Tehreek (HDT), Rehman has been vocal about important issues affecting the people of Gwadar. HDT is a protest against illegal fishing, trawling and unnecessary check posts. The movement's demands include a reduction in the number of check posts, facilitation of cross-border trade and a complete end to deep-sea fish trawling in the sea off Gwadar.

== Arrest and charges ==
Maulana Hidayat-ur-Rehman was arrested outside a court in Gwadar on 13 January 2023. He was charged with the murder of a police constable Yasir, who was killed during the protest. Police alleged that Rehman incited people to throw stones at government vehicles in protest. Later, the anti-terrorism court handed him over to the crime branch police on a three-day physical remand.

The Supreme Court of Pakistan ordered the release of Maulana Hidayatur Rehman on 18 May 2023. He was released on bail on two sureties of Rs 0.3 million.

== Advocacy for the Baloch people ==
Maulana Hidayatur Rehman has held the Sardars (chiefs) of Balochistan and their guardians are equally responsible for the deprivations of the people of the province. They are demanding education, clean drinking water and health facilities for the local people of Gwadar. He has also expressed concern over corruption and unfair distribution of resources in the province.
