= PB-45 Quetta-VIII =

Constituency of the Provincial Assembly of Balochistan, Pakistan

- Constituency for the Provincial Assembly of Balochistan
- Region: Quetta City area of Quetta District

Current constituency
- Member: Vacant
- Created from: PB-5 Quetta-V (2002-2018); PB-29 Quetta-VI (2018-2023)

PB-45 Quetta-VIII (پی بی-45 کوئٹہ-8) is a constituency of the Provincial Assembly of Balochistan.

== General elections 2024 ==
Provincial elections were held on 8 February 2024. Ali Madad Jattak won the election with 6,883 votes.

Provincial election 2024: PB-45 Quetta-VIII
| Party | Candidate | Votes | % | ±% |
|---|---|---|---|---|
| PPP | Ali Madad Jattak | 6,883 | 38.77 | |
| PNAP | Nasrullah Zayrai | 4,122 | 23.22 | |
| JUI (F) | Mir Muhammad Usman Pirkani | 3,731 | 21.02 | |
| PMAP | Abdul Majeed Khan | 998 | 5.62 | |
| BNP (M) | Ghulam Rasool Mengal | 500 | 2.82 | |
| Others | Others (twenty-nine candidates) | 1,518 | 8.55 | |
| Turnout | | 17,793 | 35.36 | |
| Total valid votes | | 17,752 | 99.77 | |
| Rejected ballots | | 41 | 0.23 | |
| Majority | | 2,761 | 15.55 | |
| Registered electors | | 50,319 | | |

A re-poll on 15 polling stations was held on 5 January 2025, and was won by Ali Madad Jattak. As a result, his victory was notified by the ECP.

== General elections 2013 ==
| Contesting candidates | Party affiliation | Votes polled |

== General elections 2008 ==
| Contesting candidates | Party affiliation | Votes polled |

== See also ==
- PB-44 Quetta-VII
- PB-46 Quetta-IX
