= Asghar Khan Achakzai =

Pakistani politician

Member of the Provincial Assembly of Balochistan
- In office 13 August 2018 – 12 August 2023
- Constituency: PB-23 (Killa Abdullah-III)

Provincial President of Awami National Party (Balochistan)
- In office 2014–2018

Personal details
- Born: 4 February 1977 (age 49) Chaman, Killa Abdullah District, Balochistan, Pakistan
- Party: ANP (2014)
- Parent: Haji Jillani Khan (father)

Asghar Khan Achakzai (born 4 February 1977) is a Pakistani politician who had been a member of the Provincial Assembly of Balochistan from August 2018 to August 2023.

== Personal life ==
Achakzai was born on 4 February 1977 in Chaman located in Killa Abdullah District of Balochistan, Pakistan. As of 2018, his residence was located in Murda Karez neighborhood of Chaman.

== Political career ==
Achakzai was president of Balochistan wing of Awami National Party from 2014 to 2018. He was elected as a member of Provincial Assembly of Balochistan from the constituency PB-23 (Killa Abdullah-III) on 25 July 2018.

On 20 October 2018, he was made member of a committee which is tasked to discuss the matters related to Saindak Copper Gold Project with federal government so that Balochistan's share of revenue generated from that project can be granted to the province exchequer according to the provisions of 18th Amendment to the Constitution of Pakistan.
