= Hazara Democratic Party =

Hazara Democratic Party ہزارہ ڈیموکریٹک پارٹی حزب دموکراتیک هزاره
- Abbreviation: HDP
- Chairman: Abdul Khaliq Hazara
- Founder: Hussain Ali Yousafi
- Founded: 2003; 23 years ago
- Headquarters: Quetta
- Student wing: Hazara Student Federation
- Ideology: Democratic socialism Social democracy Hazara nationalism
- Political position: Centre-left
- National affiliation: Tehreek Tahafuz Ayin
- International affiliation: Socialist International; Unrepresented Nations and Peoples Organization; Progressive Alliance
- Provincial Assembly of Balochistan: 0 / 65

Election symbol
- Moon (مافـتی)

Party flag

Website
- http://www.hdp.org.pk

The Hazara Democratic Party (HDP) (Urdu: ہزارہ ڈیموکریٹک پارٹی; Dari: حزب دموکراتیک هزاره) is a political party of the Hazara people in Pakistan. It is mainly active in Quetta city, where up to half a million Hazara currently reside.

== Establishment ==
In September 2002, the political worker, scholar and other Hazara tribesmen worked together to form a political platform for the Hazaras of Pakistan which will serve the nation for their rights and justice. After 20 separate meetings with political workers and tribesman, on July 1, 2003, they announced a national and political Party with the name of Hazara Democratic Party (هزاره ڈیموکریٹک پارٹی).

Before the formation of the Hazara Democratic Party (HDP), Hazara people in Balochistan, concentrated in Quetta, Khuzdar, Zhob, Loralai, and Dera Murad Jamali, lacked a formal political representation and had limited involvement in provincial and national politics. The HDP was established to empower the Hazara community politically and safeguard their interests. Additionally, the party includes a women's wing with nine units, actively promoting female participation across all levels of socio-political life. The HDP identifies as a liberal and democratic party, advocating strongly for equal opportunities for women in national affairs.

== Leader assassination ==
Hussain Ali Yousafi, who was elected as a chairman of the Hazara Democratic Party on 26 September 2008, was shot dead by the banned Lashkar-e-Jhangvi, A Deobandi extremist group in the Pakistani city of Quetta on 26 January 2009. The death of Yousafi was shocking not only for Hazaras but also for Pakistan and was condemned by the nation's leaders. Hussain Ali Yousafi was working for peace and humanity and his assassination sparked worldwide protests.

Mr. Abdul Aziz Hazara who was elected as a major office-bearer at Hazara Democratic Party on 25 October 2010 was shot dead together with his youngest son Naveed Ullah by the banned Lashkar-e-Jhangvi and Tehreek-e-Taliban Deobandi extremist group in Afghanistan, in the city of Ghazni. The death of Abdul Aziz Hazara was shocking not only for Hazaras but also for Pakistan and was condemned worldwide.

== Worldwide protest 2012 ==
In the beginning of 2012, HDP started spreading word that they would arrange demonstrations against killings of Hazara people in Quetta and Afghanistan. These demonstrations were held globally by the various Hazara diasporas residing in those different countries.

== Notable leaders ==
=== Chairmen ===
1. Muhammad Jawad Easar (2003 – 2008)
2. Hussain Ali Yousafi (September 2008 – January 2009)
3. Abdul Khaliq Hazara (November 2010 – Present)

=== Major office bearers ===
Cabinate	Holder Name
Chairman	Abdul Khaliq Hazara
First Vice Chairman	Mirza Hussain Hazara
Second Vice Chairman	Azizullah Hazara
General Secretary	Ahmed Ali Kohzad
Deputy Secretary	Younas Changezi
Economic Secretary	Mohammad Raza Hazara
Information secretary	Qadir Nayal
Organizing Secretary	Ghulam Raza

=== Other leaders and affiliated figures ===
- Javad Hazara
- Ahmad Ali Kohzad, Nazim Halqa 60
- Mohammad Reza Hazara, Naib Nazim Halqa 60
- Mirza Hazara
- Mohammad Reza Wakil
- Bostan Kishtmand
- Abdul Ali

== See also ==
- Hussain Ali Yousafi
- Hazara Town
- Muhammad Musa
- Hazara Student Federation
