= NA-251 Sherani-cum-Zhob-cum-Killa Saifullah =

Constituency of the National Assembly of Pakistan

- Constituency for the National Assembly of Pakistan
- Region: Killa Saifullah District, Zhob District, Sherani District
- Electorate: 323,587

Current constituency
- Party: Jamiat Ulema-e-Islam (F)
- Member: Syed Samiullah
- Created from: NA-257 (Zhob-cum-Killa Saifullah)

NA-251 Sherani-cum-Zhob-cum-Killa Saifullah (این اے-251، شیرانی-کم-ژوب-کم-قلعه سيف الله) is a constituency for the National Assembly of Pakistan.

== Assembly Segments ==
Constituency number	Constituency	District	Current MPA	Party
1	PB-1 Sherani-cum-Zhob	Sherani	Muhammad Nawaz Khan	JUI-F
2	PB-2 Zhob	Zhob	Fazal Qadir	JUI-F
3	PB-3 Killa Saifullah	Killa Saifullah	Maulana Noorullah	PPP

== Members of Parliament ==
=== 2018–2023: NA-257 Killa Saifullah-cum-Zhob-cum-Sherani ===
Election	Member	Party
2018	Abdul Wasey	MMA

=== 2026–present: NA-251 Sherani-cum-Zhob-cum-Killa Saifullah ===
Election	Member	Party
2024	Khushal Khan Kakar	PKNAP

== Election 2002 ==
General elections were held on 10 October 2002. Maulvi Muhammad Khan Sherani of Muttahida Majlis-e-Amal won by 20,381 votes.

General election 2002: NA-264 Killa Saifullah-cum-Zhob-cum-Sherani
Party	Candidate	Votes	%	±%
MMA	Muhammad Khan Sherani	20,381	42.73	
PMAP	Nawab Ayaz Jogezai	18,322	38.41	
Kakar Jamhoori Party Pakistan	Malik Shamsuddin Kakar	4,074	8.54	
PML(Q)	Azizullah	1,763	3.70	
ANP	Shamsullah Kakar	1,532	3.21	
Others	Others (five candidates)	1,631	3.41	
Turnout		50,582	25.53	
Total valid votes		47,703	94.31	
Rejected ballots		2,879	5.69	
Majority		2,059	4.32	
Registered electors		198,124		

== Election 2008 ==
General elections were held on 18 February 2008. Maulvi Asmatullah an independent candidate won by 24,204 votes.

General election 2008: NA-264 Killa Saifullah-cum-Zhob-cum-Sherani
Party	Candidate	Votes	%	±%
Independent	Asmatullah	24,204	41.18	
MMA	Muhammad Khan Sherani	17,066	29.03	
PML(Q)	Sheikh Jaffar Khan Mandokhail	10,951	18.63	
ANP	Mamoon Khan Kakar	2,877	4.89	
PPP	Sardar Wazir Ahmed Jogezai	2,514	4.28	
Others	Others (three candidates)	1,170	6.90	
Turnout		62,072	27.92	
Total valid votes		60,817	97.98	
Rejected ballots		1,875	2.02	
Majority		7,138	12.15	
Registered electors		222,230		
Independent gain from MMA				

== Election 2013 ==
General elections were held on 11 May 2013. Moulana Mohammad Khan Sherani of JUI-F won by 30,870 votes and became the member of National Assembly.

General election 2013: NA-264 Killa Saifullah-cum-Zhob-cum-Sherani
Party	Candidate	Votes	%	±%
JUI (F)	Muhammad Khan Sherani	30,870	33.22	
JUINP	Asmatullah	27,514	29.61	
PMAP	Raza Muhammad Raza	21,839	23.51	
Others	Others (seven candidates)	12,702	13.66	
Turnout		98,843	45.92	
Total valid votes		92,925	94.01	
Rejected ballots		5,918	5.99	
Majority		3,356	3.61	
Registered electors		215,250		
JUI (F) gain from Independent				

== Election 2018 ==
General elections were held on 25 July 2018.

General election 2018: NA-257 Killa Saifullah-cum-Zhob-cum-Sherani
Party	Candidate	Votes	%	±%
MMA	Abdul Wasey	43,851	37.17	
PMAP	Allah Noor	22,446	19.03	
JUINP	Abdur Rauf	21,796	18.48	
PTI	Muhammad Amin Khan Jogezai	16,487	13.98	
Others	Others (seven candidates)	13,392	11.34	
Turnout		126,311	46.86	
Total valid votes		117,972	93.40	
Rejected ballots		8,339	6.60	
Majority		21,405	18.14	
Registered electors		269,575		
MMA^{†} hold		Swing	N/A	

^{†}JUI-F contested as part of MMA

== Election 2024 ==
General elections were held on 8 February 2024. Syed Samiullah won the election with 46,210 votes.

General election 2024: NA-251 Sherani-cum-Zhob-cum-Killa Saifullah
Party	Candidate	Votes	%	±%
JUI (F)	Syed Samiullah	46,210	32.90	N/A
PNAP	Khushal Khan Kakar	46,117	32.83	N/A
PMAP	Nawab Ayaz Jogezai	24,231	17.25	▼1.78
Others	Others (fourteen candidates)	23,913	17.02	
Turnout		148,117	45.77	▼1.09
Total valid votes		140,471	94.84	
Rejected ballots		7,646	5.16	
Majority		93	0.07	▼18.07
Registered electors		323,588		
JUI (F) hold				

== See also ==
- NA-250 Karachi Central-IV
- NA-252 Musakhel-cum-Barkhan-cum-Loralai-cum-Duki
