= Muslimbagh railway station =

Railway station in Pakistan

Coordinates: 30.808624°N 67.741593°E

Muslimbagh Railway Station مسلم باغ ریلوے اسٹیشن

General information
- Owner: Ministry of Railways
- Line: Zhob Valley Railway

Other information
- Station code: MMBH

Services
Preceding station	Pakistan Railways	Following station
Kan Mehtarzai towards Bostan Junction	Zhob Valley Railway (defunct)	Kila Saifullah towards Zhob
Location

Muslimbagh Railway Station (Urdu: مسلم باغ ریلوے اسٹیشن), previously known as Hindubagh railway station, is located in town of Muslim Bagh, Killa Saifullah District, Balochistan, Pakistan.

== See also ==
- List of railway stations in Pakistan
- Pakistan Railways
