= Kila Saifullah railway station =

Former railway station in Balochistan, Pakistan

Kila Saifullah Station قلعہ سیف اللہ ریلوے اسٹیشن

General information
- Coordinates: 30.7122°N 68.3650°E
- Owner: Ministry of Railways
- Line: Zhob Valley Railway

Other information
- Station code: KSFL

Services
Preceding station	Pakistan Railways	Following station
Muslimbagh towards Bostan Junction	Zhob Valley Railway (defunct)	Alozai towards Zhob
Location

Kila Saifullah Railway Station (Urdu: قلعہ سیف اللہ ریلوے اسٹیشن) is a station in Killa Saifullah District Pakistan.

== See also ==
- List of railway stations in Pakistan
- Pakistan Railways
