= Abdul Wasey =

Pakistani politician

Minister for Housing and Works
- In office 19 April 2022 – 9 August 2023
- President: Arif Alvi
- Prime Minister: Shehbaz Sharif
- Preceded by: Tariq Bashir Cheema

Member of the National Assembly of Pakistan
- In office 13 August 2018 – 10 August 2023
- Preceded by: Muhammad Khan Sherani
- Constituency: NA-257 (Killa Saifullah-cum-Zhob-cum-Sherani)

Leader of Opposition in Provincial Assembly of Balochistan
- In office 17 March 2013 – 31 May 2018
- Preceded by: Yar Muhammad Rind
- Succeeded by: Malik Sikandar Khan

Member of the Provincial Assembly of Provincial Assembly of Balochistan
- In office 29 May 2013 – 31 May 2018
- Preceded by: Himself
- Succeeded by: Maulana Noorullah
- Constituency: PB-20 Killa Saifullah
- In office 2008–2013
- Preceded by: Himself
- Succeeded by: Himself
- Constituency: PB-20 Killa Saifullah
- In office 2002–2007
- Preceded by: Himself
- Succeeded by: Himself
- Constituency: PB-20 Killa Saifullah
- In office 1997–1999
- Preceded by: Himself
- Succeeded by: Himself
- Constituency: PB-15 Killa Saifullah
- In office 1993–1996
- Preceded by: Maulvi Asmatullah
- Succeeded by: Himself
- Constituency: PB-15 Killa Saifullah

Senior Minister of Planning & Development
- In office 2008–2013
- In office 2002–2007

Minister of Forest & Wildlife
- In office 1997–1999

Personal details
- Born: Killa Saifullah District, Balochistan, Pakistan
- Party: JUI (F) (1993-present)
- Other political affiliations: MMA (2002)
- Occupation: Politician

Abdul Wasey (Urdu: مولانا عبد الواسع) is a Pakistani Islamic Scholar and politician who is the president of Jamiat Ulema-e-Islam (F) in Balochistan province and had previously served as the Minister for Housing and Works from 2022 to 2023.

He was also a member of the National Assembly of Pakistan from 2018 to 2023.

He has also remained member of the Provincial Assembly of Balochistan from 1993 to 1996 and 1997 to 1999 and then consecutively for three terms, from 2002 to 2018.

== Political career ==
He was elected to the Provincial Assembly of Balochistan as a candidate of Islamic Jamhoori Mahaz from Constituency PB-15 Killa Saifullah in the 1993 Pakistani general election.

He was re-elected to the Provincial Assembly of Balochistan as a candidate of Jamiat Ulema-e Islam (F) from Constituency PB-15 Killa Saifullah in the 1997 Pakistani general election.

He was twice re-elected to the Provincial Assembly of Balochistan as a candidate of Muttahida Majlis-e-Amal from Constituency PB-20 Killa Saifullah in the 2002 Pakistani general election and 2008 Pakistani general election.

He was re-elected to the Provincial Assembly of Balochistan as a candidate of Jamiat Ulema-e Islam (F) from Constituency PB-20 Killa Saifullah in the 2013 Pakistani general election respectively.

He then briefly served as the Leader of Opposition in Balochistan Assembly from 2013 to 2018.

He also served as ٓSenior Minister of Planning and Development in Balochistan twicely from 2002 to 2007 and 2008–2013.

He was elected to the National Assembly of Pakistan from Constituency NA-257 (Killa Saifullah-cum-Zhob-cum-Sherani) as a candidate of Muttahida Majlis-e-Amal in the 2018 Pakistani general election.

On 19 April 2022, he was appointed as Minister of Housing and Works in Shehbaz Sharif ministry which he served till 9 August 2023.

== See also ==
- List of members of the 15th National Assembly of Pakistan
- No-confidence motion against Imran Khan
- List of Deobandis
