= Kan Mehtarzai railway station =

Railway station in Pakistan

Coordinates: 30.721774°N 67.525865°E

Kan Mehtarzai Station کان مہترزئی ریلوے اسٹیشن

General information
- Owner: Ministry of Railways
- Line: Zhob Valley Railway

Other information
- Station code: KZZ

History
- Opened: 1921
- Closed: 1986

Services
Preceding station	Pakistan Railways	Following station
Churmian towards Bostan Junction	Zhob Valley Railway (defunct)	Muslimbagh towards Zhob
Location

Kan Mehtarzai Railway Station (Urdu: کان مہترزئی ریلوے اسٹیشن) was a railway station located in the Balochistan province of Pakistan. It is on Zhob Valley Railway, the former narrow-gauge line between Bostan and Zhob, 16 miles west of Muslim Bagh. At 2224 meters above sea level, it was the highest railway station in Pakistan until service was discontinued in 1986.

== See also ==
- List of railway stations in Pakistan
- Pakistan Railways
