= Churmian railway station =

Railway station in Pakistan

Churmian Railway Station چورمیاں ریلوے اسٹیشن

General information
- Owner: Ministry of Railways
- Line: Zhob Valley Railway

Other information
- Station code: CRE

Services
Preceding station	Pakistan Railways	Following station
Khanai towards Bostan Junction	Zhob Valley Railway (defunct)	Kan Mehtarzai towards Zhob
Location

Churmian Railway Station (Urdu: چورمیاں ریلوے اسٹیشن) is located in Pakistan.

== See also ==
- List of railway stations in Pakistan
- Pakistan Railways
