= Syed Samiullah =

Member of the National Assembly of Pakistan from Balochistan (2024–2029)

- سید سمیعُ ﷲ

Member of the National Assembly of Pakistan
- In office 29 February 2024 – 27 February 2026
- Succeeded by: Khushal Khan Kakar
- Constituency: NA-251 Sherani-cum-Zhob-cum-Killa Saifullah

Personal details
- Party: JUI (F) (2024-present)

Syed Samiullah (Urdu: سید سمیعُ ﷲ) is a Pakistani politician who is a former member of the National Assembly of Pakistan.

== Political career ==
Samiullah won the 2024 Pakistani general election from NA-251 Sherani-cum-Zhob-cum-Killa Saifullah as a Jamiat Ulema-e-Islam (F) candidate. He received 46,210 votes while runner up Khushal Khan Kakar of Pashtunkhwa National Awami Party received 46,117 votes.After losing the election, Khushal Khan Kakar filed a petition challenging the result of the NA-251 constituency. The Supreme Court of Pakistan subsequently declared him the returned candidate and directed the Election Commission of Pakistan to issue his formal notification of success in February 2026.
