= NA-262 Quetta-I =

Constituency of the National Assembly of Pakistan

- Constituency for the National Assembly of Pakistan
- Region: Panjpai Tehsil, Quetta Cantonment and City (partly) of Quetta District
- Electorate: 175,744

Current constituency
- Created: 2018
- Party: PTI
- Member: Adil Khan Bazai

NA-262 Quetta-I (این اے-262، کوئٹہ-١) is a constituency for the National Assembly of Pakistan. It primarily encompasses the Kuchlak Tehsil and Saddar Tehsil of Quetta District, with an electorate of 175,744 people.

== Assembly Segments ==
Constituency number	Constituency	District	Current MPA	Party
38	PB-38 Quetta-I	Quetta	Naeem Khan Bazai	ANP
39	PB-39 Quetta-II	Quetta	Bakht Muhammad Kakar	PML(N)
40	PB-40 Quetta-III	Quetta	Samad Khan Gorgage	PPP

== Members of Parliament ==
=== 2018–2023: NA-264 Quetta-I ===
Election	Member	Party
2018	Maulvi Asmatullah	MMA

=== 2024–present: NA-262 Quetta-I ===
Election	Member	Party
2024	Adil Khan Bazai	PTI

== Election 2018 ==
General elections were held on 25 July 2018.

General election 2018: NA-264 Quetta-I
Party	Candidate	Votes	%	±%
MMA	Asmatullah	14,887	22.12	
BNP (M)	Abdul Wali Kakar	10,071	14.97	
PTI	Saifullah Khan	10,053	14.94	
PMAP	Abdul Rehman	8,980	13.34	
PPP	Muhammad Yousaf Khilji	6,989	10.39	
HDP	Muhammad Raza	5,890	8.75	
BAP	Ali Muhammad Nasar	2,882	4.28	
PML(N)	Amir Afzal Khan Mandhokhail	2,159	3.21	
JUINP	Molana Abdul Qadir Looni	2,070	3.08	
ANP	Ghulam Muhammad	1,873	2.78	
Others	Others (four candidates)	1,437	2.14	
Turnout		69,887	39.77	
Total valid votes		67,291	96.29	
Rejected ballots		2,596	3.71	
Majority		4,816	7.15	
Registered electors		175,744		
MMA win (new seat)				

== Election 2024 ==
General elections were held on 8 February 2024. Adil Khan Bazai won the election with 20,278 votes.

General election 2024: NA-262 Quetta-I
Party	Candidate	Votes	%	±%
PTI	Adil Khan Bazai (Note: Filed nomination papers as PTI candidate but ECP allowed him to run as an Independent)	20,278	25.98	▲11.04
JUI (F)	Malik Sikandar Khan	12,887	16.51	N/A
PNAP	Khushal Khan Kakar	8,835	11.32	N/A
PMAP	Nawab Ayaz Jogezai	8,447	10.82	▼2.52
PPP	Muhammad Ramzan	6,923	8.87	▼1.52
HDP	Aziz Ullah	4,264	5.46	▼3.29
Others	Others (thirty one candidates)	16,422	21.04	
Turnout		79,433	33.21	▼6.56
Total valid votes		78,056	98.27	
Rejected ballots		1,377	1.73	
Majority		7,391	9.47	
Registered electors		239,192		
PTI gain from PPP				

== See also ==
- NA-261 Surab-cum-Kalat-cum-Mastung
- NA-263 Quetta-II
