= 2018 Pakistani Senate election =

- 3 March 2018

52 of the 104 seats in the Senate of Pakistan 53 seats needed for a majority

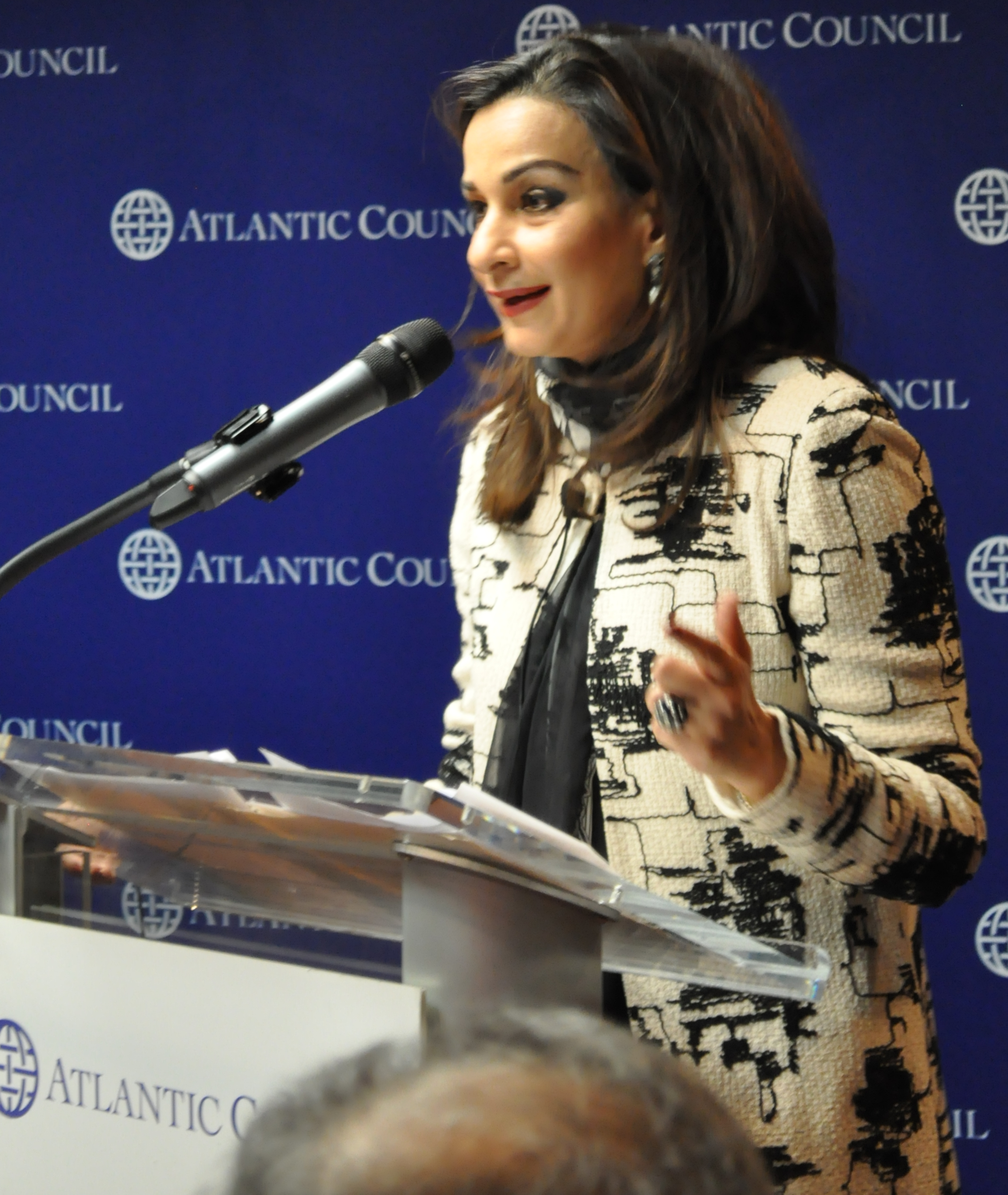

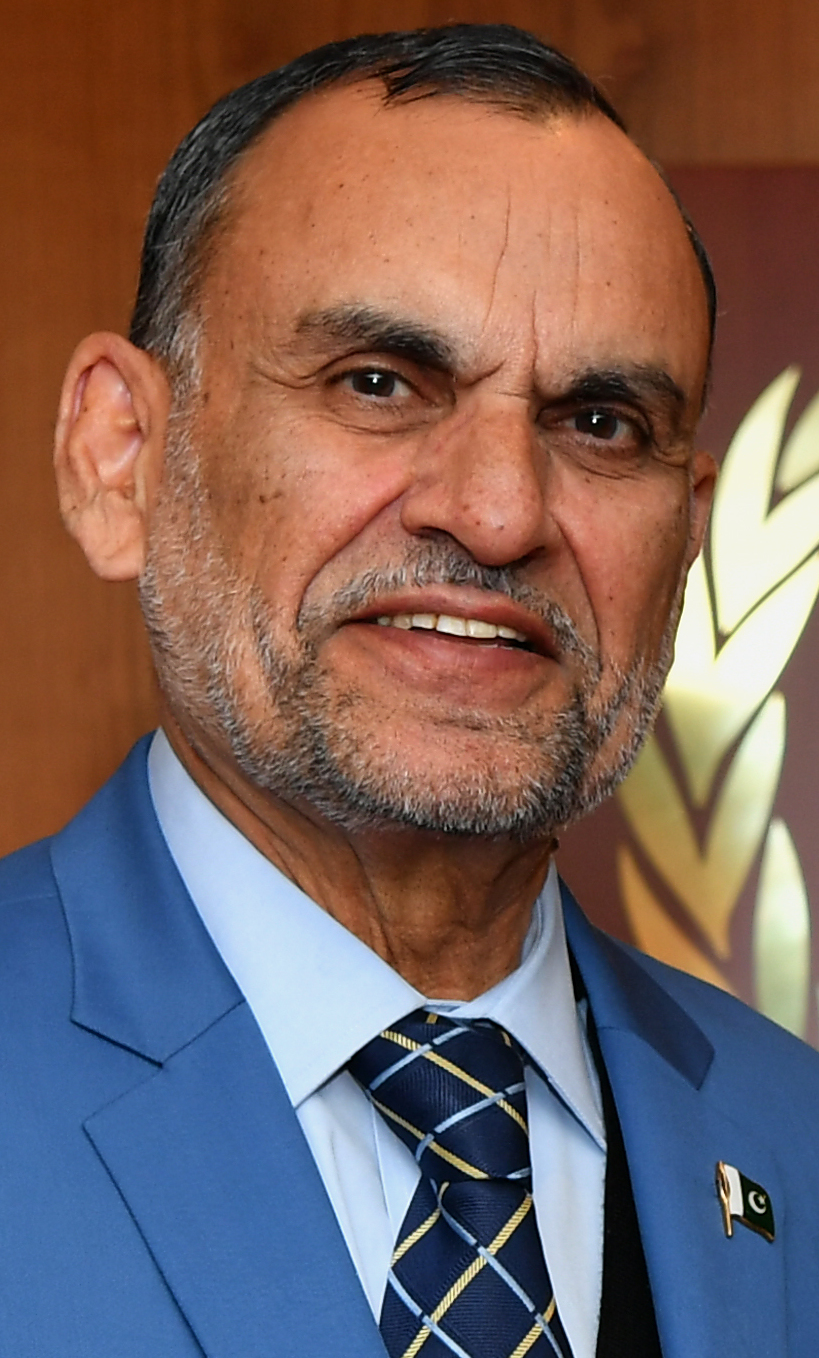
	Majority party	Minority party	Third party
Leader	Raja Zafar-ul-Haq	Sherry Rehman	Azam Swati
Party	PML(N)	PPP	PTI
Leader's seat	Technocrat Punjab	General Sindh	Technocrat KP
Last election	26	27	9
Seats won	33	20	15
Seat change	▲7	▼7	▲6
- Results by province
Chairman before election
Raza Rabbani
PPP
Elected Chairman
Sadiq Sanjrani
BAP

Triennial Senate elections were in Pakistan held on 3 March 2018 to replace 52 retiring senators - half of the Senate's strength - with the winning candidates serving six-year terms. Overall, Pakistan Muslim League (N) came out as the largest party, followed by the Pakistan Peoples Party and the Pakistan Tehreek-e-Insaf. The results of these elections were steeped in controversy due to rampant allegations of horse trading and vote-buying, which lead to the Prime Minister and opposition leader Imran Khan calling for reforms. Prior to this election, PML (N) candidates were declared as independents by the Election Commission of Pakistan owing to a Supreme Court judgment.

Elections for the chairmanship and deputy chairmanship of the senate were held on 12 March 2018. Both posts were won by joint opposition's candidates with Sadiq Sanjrani and Saleem Mandviwalla being elected chairman and deputy chairman, respectively.

== Background ==
The Senate of Pakistan is the upper house of the Parliament of Pakistan. It consists of 104 senators with each senator serving a 6-year term. The elections are conducted triennially for half the seats in the senate. This staggered nature of the terms means that at any given time senators from two different elections are serving in the Senate.

The 2018 elections were conducted on 3 March 2018 to replace the senators elected during the 2012 elections. The electoral process is based on an indirect single transferable vote. This is in contrast to the methodology of direct first-past-the-post voting used in all other parliamentary elections in the country. Thus, effectively, the senators in Pakistan are voted for by serving members of the country's National and Provincial Assemblies and not the public. This reduction in electorate, the transferable nature of the vote, and secrecy of the ballot have resulted in the senate elections in the country being almost always marred by allegations of vote trading.

In terms of seats, there is a fixed representation of each of the country's administrative units in the senate, apart from the disputed territories of Gilgit-Baltistan and Azad Kashmir. There are 23 seats from each province, 8 from Federally Administered Tribal Areas, and 4 from the capital region of Islamabad. In a given election, half of these seats are contested. Due to the odd nature of the number of seats from the provinces, each election cycle sees two provinces elect all 12 representatives, while the remaining two elect 11.

This year's elections took place in an environment of uncertainty as one of the electing houses, the Balochistan Assembly, saw an in-house change, the lower house's speaker, Ayaz Sadiq, voiced concerns that 'hidden elements' might not let the current government complete its term, and the candidacy of PML-N candidates was stripped mere days before the election. Further still, in the lead up to the elections, the ruling PML-N was of the opinion that the provincial assemblies in which it is not in power, namely, Balochistan, Sindh, and Khyber Pakhtunkhwa, might be prematurely dissolved to postpone the senate elections until after the general elections.

=== Candidacy of PML-N Nominees ===
On 28 July 2017, the Supreme Court of Pakistan disqualified Prime Minister Nawaz Sharif from holding public office. Following this, the Elections Act 2017 was passed, which allowed Sharif to serve as party head despite being disqualified. However, in a later judgement passed by the Supreme Court on 21 February 2018, Sharif was disqualified from holding office as party president. In this judgement, all decisions taken by Sharif during his tenure as party president were declared null and void, including Senate tickets which he had signed himself. To prevent delay in Senate elections, the Election Commission of Pakistan declared all PML(N) candidates as Independents.

== Voting ==
Voting is conducted on the basis of single transferable vote where a voter prioritizes their vote among a list of candidates. First priority votes are given the highest weightage and carry 100 points. The Election Commission of Pakistan establishes the criterion for the minimum number of points required to attain a senate seat. During the first count, when a candidate breaches that criterion, they are declared a winner for the seat. Any surplus points they have are divided among other preferences in successive iteration(s). Similarly, a candidate who falls well short of this criterion during the first count has their points transferred among other preferences in subsequent count(s). This whole exercise is repeated iteratively until all vacant seats are filled.

It is pertinent to mention that the points system is only used for senators to be elected from general, women, and technocrat seats in provincial assemblies. For senators who are elected from the National Assembly or are running for a minority/non-Muslim seat in the provinces, only a vote count is used.

In a typical election, a total of 52 seats are contested. Of which 33 are general seats (7 from each province, 4 from FATA, and 1 from Islamabad), 9 are technocrat seats (2 from each province, and 1 from Islamabad), 8 are women seats (2 apiece from each province), and 2 are minority seats (1 each from 2 provinces).

=== Voting Requirements ===
The following table outlines the voting requirements in the current senate elections. The Minimum Votes Required column only considers first priority votes:

General Seats
Administrative Unit	Elections Conducted at	Points Required	Minimum Votes Required
Punjab	Provincial Assembly	4563	46
Sindh	Provincial Assembly	1838	19
Khyber Pakhtunkhwa	Provincial Assembly	1476	15
Balochistan	Provincial Assembly	788	8
FATA	National Assembly^{†}	N/A	7
ICT	National Assembly	N/A	146

^{†}Only members from FATA are eligible to vote.

Technocrat Seats
Administrative Unit	Elections Conducted at	Points Required	Minimum Votes Required
Punjab	Provincial Assembly	12067	121
Sindh	Provincial Assembly	5001	51
Khyber Pakhtunkhwa	Provincial Assembly	4001	41
Balochistan	Provincial Assembly	2134	22
ICT	National Assembly	N/A	144

Women Seats
Administrative Unit	Elections Conducted at	Points Required	Minimum Votes Required
Punjab	Provincial Assembly	12067	121
Sindh	Provincial Assembly	5001	51
Khyber Pakhtunkhwa	Provincial Assembly	4001	41
Balochistan	Provincial Assembly	2134	22

Minority Seats^{‡}
Administrative Unit	Elections Conducted at	Minimum Votes Required
Punjab	Provincial Assembly	179
Sindh	Provincial Assembly	75

^{‡}Minority Seats are filled for only 2 provinces in a given election. This way the elections for these seats alternate between Punjab/Sindh and Balochistan/KPK.

== Candidates ==
A total of 131 candidates were in the run for the 52 seats. 33 from Sindh, 26 from Khyber Pakhtunkhwa, 24 from FATA, 23 from Balochistan, 20 from Punjab, and 5 from Islamabad.

=== Candidates by Administrative Unit ===
Punjab
Seat Type	Candidate	Party
General	Asif Kirmani	PML-N
General	Mehmoodul Hassan	PML-N
General	Rana Maqbool	PML-N
General	Zubair Gul	PML-N
General	Shaheen Butt	PML-N
General	Musadik Malik	PML-N
General	Haroon Khan	PML-N
General	Kamil Ali Agha	PML-Q
General	Shahzad Khan	PPP
General	Chaudhry Sarwar	PTI
Technocrat	Naseer Bhutta	PML-N
Technocrat	Hafiz Abdul Kareem	PML-N
Technocrat	Ishaq Dar	PML-N
Technocrat	Nawazish Pirzada	PPP
Technocrat	Asif Javaid	PTI
Women	Saadia Abbasi	PML-N
Women	Nuzhat Sadiq	PML-N
Women	Andaleeb Abbas	PTI
Minority	Kamran Michael	PML-N
Minority	Victor Azariah	PTI

Sindh
Seat Type	Candidate	Party
General	Ahmed Chinoy	MQM
General	Amin-ul-Haq	MQM
General	Amir Chishti	MQM
General	Farhan Chishti	MQM
General	Farogh Naseem	MQM
General	Kamran Tessori	MQM
General	Muzaffar Hussain	PML-F
General	Sarfaraz Jatoi	PML-N
General	Imamuddin Shouqeen	PPP
General	Ayaz Mehar	PPP
General	Ali Shah Jamot	PPP
General	Murtaza Wahab	PPP
General	Mustafa Khokhar	PPP
General	Moula Bux Chandio	PPP
General	Raza Rabbani	PPP
General	Anis Ahmed Khan	PSP
General	Sagheer Ahmed	PSP
General	Mubashir Imam	PSP
Technocrat	Hasan Feroz	MQM
Technocrat	Abdul Kadir Khanzada	MQM
Technocrat	Ali Raza Abidi	MQM
Technocrat	Sikandar Mandhro	PPP
Technocrat	Rukhsana Zuberi	PPP
Technocrat	Najeeb Haroon	PTI
Women	Nikhat Shakeel	MQM
Women	Kishwer Zehra	MQM
Women	Nasreen Jalil	MQM
Women	Mangla Sharma	MQM
Women	Qurutulain Marri	PPP
Women	Keshoo Bai	PPP
Minority	Sanjay Perwani	MQM
Minority	Anwar Lal Deen	PPP
Minority	Mohan Manjiani	PSP

Khyber Pakhtunkhwa
Seat Type	Candidate	Party
General	Masood Abbas	ANP
General	Mushtaq Ahmed	JI
General	Gul Naseeb Khan	JUI-F
General	Talha Mahmood	JUI-F
General	Pir Sabir Shah	PML-N
General	Ali Afzal Jadoon	PML-N
General	Bahramand Tangi	PPP
General	Faisal Sakhi Butt	PPP
General	Khial Zaman	PTI
General	Abdul Latif Yousafzai	PTI
General	Fida Muhammad	PTI
General	Faisal Javed	PTI
General	Muhammad Ayub	PTI
General	Muhammad Ghufran	QWP
Technocrat	Yaqoob Sheikh	JUI-F
Technocrat	Sami-ul-Haq	Independent
Technocrat	Dilawar Khan	PML-N
Technocrat	Nisar Khan	PML-N
Technocrat	Azam Swati	PTI
Women	Shagufta Malik	ANP
Women	Naeema Kishwar	JUI-F
Women	Sobia Shahid	PML-N
Women	Raeesa Daud	PML-N
Women	Rubina Khalid	PPP
Women	Mehr Taj Roghani	PTI
Women	Naureen Farooq	PTI
Women	Anisa Zeb Tahirkheli	QWP

Balochistan
Seat Type	Candidate	Party
General	Nizam-ud-Din Kakkar	ANP
General	Hamayun Kurd	BNP-M
General	Ahmed Khan	Independent
General	Anwar-ul-Haq Kakar	Independent
General	Hussain Islam	Independent
General	Allauddin	Independent
General	Fateh Baloch	Independent
General	Kauda Babar	Independent
General	Sadiq Sanjrani	Independent
General	Abdul Qadir	Independent
General	Muhammad Akram	NP
General	Faiz Muhammad	JUI-F
General	Shafeeq Tareen	PKMAP
General	Amir Afzal Khan	PML-N
General	Yousaf Kakar	PML-N
General	Naseebullah Bazai	Independent
Technocrat	Kamran Murtaza	JUI-F
Technocrat	Tahir Bizenjo	NP
Technocrat	Abdul Manaf Tareen	PML-N
Women	Sana Jamali	Independent
Women	Shama Magsi	Independent
Women	Azra Syed	JUI-F
Women	Tahir Khursheed	NP
Women	Abida Azeem	PKMAP
Women	Samina Zehri	PML-N

FATA
Seat Type	Candidate	Party
General	Aqal Shah	Independent
General	Said Jamal	Independent
General	Haji Khan	Independent
General	Sajid Turi	Independent
General	Ghazi Ghazan Jamal	Independent
General	Shah Khalid	Independent
General	Shahid Hussain	Independent
General	Shoaib Hassan	Independent
General	Shammim Afridi	Independent
General	Saleh Sarwar	Independent
General	Zia-ur-Rehman	Independent
General	Tahir Iqbal	Independent
General	Abdul Raziq	Independent
General	Faiz-ur-Rehman	Independent
General	Mirza Afridi	Independent
General	Afzal Din Khan	Independent
General	Najamul Hassan	Independent
General	Nizam Uddin Khan	Independent
General	Hidayat Ullah	Independent
General	Hillal-ur-Rehman	Independent
General	Jangriz Khan	PPP
General	Akhunzada Chattan	PPP
General	Shahban Ali	PPP
General	Farhad Shabab	PPP

ICT
Seat Type	Candidate	Party
General	Asad Junejo	PML-N
General	Atif Fazal	PML-N
General	Imran Ashraf	PPP
General	Kanwa Shauzab	PTI
Technocrat	Mushahid Hussain	PML-N
Technocrat	Shakil Abbasi	PPP

== Results ==
=== Summary ===
Overall, PML (N) backed Independents won the most seats, securing 15 of the 52 seats up for election. 11 of these seats were from Punjab, 2 of them from Islamabad and 2 from Khyber Pakhtunkhwa. The Pakistan Peoples Party (PPP) closely trailed behind, securing 12 of the 52 seats. Of these, 10 were won in Sindh and 2 were won in Khyber Pakhtunkhwa. Meanwhile, Pakistan Tehreek-e-Insaf (PTI) secured 6 seats of which 5 came from Khyber Pakhtunkhwa and one from Punjab.

The strong performance of the PPP raised many eyebrows and led to allegations of 'horse trading' by the party. Noting that MQM, despite having 52 MPAs in the Sindh Assembly, only managed to secure one senator, whilst the PPP managed to secure two senators - including one on the women's seat - from Khyber Pakhtunkhwa with only 7 MPAs.

Another surprise win was by Chaudhry Sarwar of Pakistan Tehreek-e-Insaf from a general seat in Punjab who gained 44 first priority and 2 second priority votes - the most in the assembly this election. This was a surprise because the result came about despite the PTI-PML (Q) alliance only having 38 votes. This indicated that Sarwar had also been voted for by members of Pakistan Muslim League (N) and Pakistan Peoples Party.

Finally, on a Women seat from Sindh, Krishna Kolhi of the PPP became the first Dalit to be elected to the Senate of Pakistan.

=== Results by Administrative Units ===
NOTE: All PML-N candidates officially ran as Independents

==== Provinces ====
Punjab
Seat Type	Winners						
General	Asif Kirmani (PML-N)	Shaheen Butt (PML-N)	Haroon Khan (PML-N)	Musadik Malik (PML-N)	Rana Maqbool (PML-N)	Mehmoodul Hassan (PML-N)	Chaudhry Sarwar (PTI)
Technocrat	Ishaq Dar (PML-N)			Hafiz Abdul Karim (PML-N)			
Women	Saadia Abbasi (PML-N)				Nuzhat Sadiq (PML-N)		
Minority	Kamran Micheal (PML-N)						

Sindh
Seat Type	Winners						
General	Raza Rabbani (PPP)	Bux Chandio (PPP)	Ali Shah Jamote (PPP)	Mustafa Nawaz Khokar (PPP)	Sikandar Menghro (PPP)	Farogh Naseem (MQM)	Muzaffar Hussain (PML-F)
Technocrat	Rukhsana Zubairi (PPP)			Sikander Mandhro (PPP)			
Women	Qurultain Marri (PPP)				Krishna Kolhi (PPP)		
Minority	Anwar Laal Dean (PPP)						

Khyber Pakhtunkhwa
Seat Type	Winners						
General	Faisal Javed (PTI)	Muhammad Ayub (PTI)	Fida Muhammad (PTI)	Pir Sabir Shah (PML-N)	Bahramand Tangi (PPP)	Talha Mahmood (JUI-F)	Mushtaq Ahmed (JI)
Technocrat	Azam Swati (PTI)			Dilawar Khan (PML-N)			
Women	Meher Tag Roghani (PTI)				Robina Khalid (PPP)		

Balochistan
Seat Type	Winners						
General	Anwar-ul-Haq Kakar (Independent)	Ahmed Khan (Independent)	Kauda Babar (Independent)	Muhammad Sadiq Sanjrani (Independent)	Muhammad Shafiq Tareen (PkMAP)	Faiz Muhammad (JUI-F)	Muhammad Akram (NP)
Technocrat	Naseebullah Bazai (Independent)			Tahir Bizenjo (NP)			
Women	Sana Jamali (Independent)				Abida Umar (PkMAP)		

==== Federally Administered Units ====
NOTE: FATA only has general seats, while Islamabad has 1 general and 1 technocrat seat that were up in this election.

FATA
Seat Type	Winners			
General	Shammim Afridi (Independent)	Mirza Muhammad Afridi (Independent)	Hidayat Ullah (Independent)	Hillal ur Rehman (Independent)

ICT
Seat Type	Winners
General	Asad Junejo (PML-N)
Technocrat	Mushahid Hussain (PML-N)

== Election of Chairman and Deputy Chairman ==
After the winning candidates have been notified by the Election Commission, there is a one-week delay until they take oath. During that time, retiring senators make their farewell speeches and any objections on the successful candidates is handled. After this time has lapsed, the reconstituted senate elects their Chairman and Deputy Chairman by a simple majority via a secret ballot.

=== Candidates and Results ===
Two candidates apiece, from the opposition and treasury benches, contested the elections on 12 March 2018. Joint opposition's candidates, Sadiq Sanjrani and Saleem Mandviwalla, won the elections for their respective seats.

Candidate	Contesting for	Party	Votes Obtained	Supported by
Sadiq Sanjrani	Chairmanship	Independent	57	Opposition Benches Independents
Saleem Mandviwalla	Deputy Chairmanship	PPP	54	Opposition Benches Independents
Raja Zafar-ul-Haq	Chairmanship	PML-N	46	Treasury Benches
Usman Khan Kakar	Deputy Chairmanship	PkMAP	44	Treasury Benches
