= Alozai railway station =

Railway station in Pakistan

Alozai Railway Station آلو زئی ریلوے اسٹیشن

General information
- Location: Alozai, Balochistan; Pakistan
- Coordinates: 30.68712°N 68.63107°E
- Owner: Ministry of Railways
- Line: Zhob Valley Railway

Other information
- Station code: ALZ

Services
Preceding station	Pakistan Railways	Following station
Kila Saifullah towards Bostan Junction	Zhob Valley Railway (defunct)	Badinzai towards Zhob
Location

Alozai Railway Station (Urdu: آلو زئی ریلوے اسٹیشن) is located in Alozai village, Balochistan, Pakistan.

== See also ==
- List of railway stations in Pakistan
- Pakistan Railways
