= Khanai railway station =

Railway station in Pakistan

Khanai Railway Station خانائی ریلوے اسٹیشن

General information
- Coordinates: 30.488379°N 67.141401°E
- Owner: Ministry of Railways
- Line: Zhob Valley Railway

Other information
- Station code: KNI

Services
Preceding station	Pakistan Railways	Following station
Bostan Junction Terminus	Zhob Valley Railway (defunct)	Churmian towards Zhob
Location
- Location within Pakistan

Khanai Railway Station (Urdu: خانائی ریلوے اسٹیشن) was a railway station located in Balochistan, Pakistan.

== See also ==
- List of railway stations in Pakistan
- Pakistan Railways
