= PB-1 Sherani-cum-Zhob =

Constituency of the Provincial Assembly of Balochistan, Pakistan

- Constituency for the Provincial Assembly of Balochistan
- Region: Sherani District and Zhob District (partly)

Current constituency
- Seats: 1
- Party: Vacant
- Member: Vacant
- Created from: PB-18 (Zhob-I) and PB-1 (Musakhel-cum-Sherani)

PB-1 Sherani-cum-Zhob (پی بی-1 شیرانی کم ژوب) is a constituency of the Provincial Assembly of Balochistan. This constituency is consist of Sherani district and Zhob district (partly) of Province Balochistan.

== General elections 2024 ==
Provincial election 2024: PB-1 Sherani-cum-Zhob
Party	Candidate	Votes	%	±%
JUI (F)	Nawaz Kibzai	14,305	37.23	
Independent	Shah Zaman	8,674	22.57	
Independent	Gul Khan (Note: Filed nomination papers as PTI candidate but ECP allowed him to run as an Independent)	3,635	9.46	
RJUI	Ahmed	2,925	7.61	
PMAP	Mehmood Khan Sherani	2,351	6.12	
Independent	Ali Muhammad	2,115	5.50	
PML(N)	Haji Mir Hassan	1,719	4.47	
Others	Others (twenty one candidates)	2,970	7.04	
Turnout		38,650	37.64	
Total valid votes		38,424	99.42	
Rejected ballots		226	0.58	
Majority		5,631	14.66	
Registered electors		102,690		
JUI (F) gain from PTI				

== General elections 2018 ==
General elections were held on 25 July 2018.

General election 2018:PB-1 (Musakhel-cum-Sherani)
Party	Candidate	Votes	%	±%
PTI	Sardar Babar Khan	12,287	32.35	
MMA	Haji Muhammad Hassan Sherani	12,214	32.16	
PMAP	Sultan Muhammad Sherani	6,047	15.92	
BAP	Nazar Khan	4,922	12.96	
Independent	Muhammad Ishag Shah Mufakir	641	1.69	
JUINP	Abdul Hameed	469	1.23	
PML(N)	Jalil Ahmed Khan	400	1.05	
Independent	Hameed Ahmed	332	0.87	
PPP	Zahir Khan	299	0.79	
Independent	Shair Hassan	186	0.49	
BNP (M)	Haq Nawaz Buzdar	60	0.16	
Independent	Muhammad Akhtar	46	0.12	
ANP	Amanullah Khan	37	0.1	
Independent	Haji Dadan	21	0.06	
Independent	Sardar Abdul Rahim Harifal	17	0.04	
Turnout		39868		
Rejected ballots		1890		
Majority		73	0.19	
Registered electors		104,815		

== See also ==
- PB-51 Chaman-II
- PB-2 Zhob
