= PB-3 Killa Saifullah =

Constituency of the Provincial Assembly of Balochistan, Pakistan

PB-3 Kila Saifullah
- Constituency for the Provincial Assembly of Balochistan
- Region: Killa Saifullah District

Current constituency
- Party: Muttahida Majlis-e-Amal
- Member: Maulana Noorullah
- Created from: PB-20 (Kila Saifullah)

PB-3 Kila Saifullah (پی بی-3 قلعہ سیف اللہ) is a constituency of the Provincial Assembly of Balochistan.

== General elections 2024 ==
Provincial election 2024: PB-3 Killa Saifullah
Party	Candidate	Votes	%	±%
Independent	Maulana Noorullah	25,125	37.54	
JUI (F)	Abdul Wasey	21,527	32.16	
ANP	Malak Amanullah Mehtarzai	11,652	17.41	
Independent	Hayatullah (Note: Filed nomination papers as PTI candidate but ECP allowed him to run as an independent)	3,464	5.18	
PMAP	Dara Khan Jogezai	1,485	2.22	
Others	Others (fifteen candidates)	3,682	5.49	
Turnout		70,532	55.80	
Total valid votes		66,935	94.90	
Rejected ballots		3,597	5.10	
Majority		3,598	5.38	
Registered electors		126,396		
PPP gain from PTI				

== General elections 2018 ==
General elections were held on 25 July 2018

General election 2018:PB-3 (Kila Safiullah)
Party	Candidate	Votes	%	±%
MMA	Molana Noor Ullah	22,486	40.61	
PMAP	Nawab Muhammad Ayaz Khan Jogezai	17,250	31.16	
JUINP	Malik Aman Ullah Mehterzai	11,875	21.45	
ANP	Muhammad Naseem	1,351	2.44	
PTI	Roshan Khan	1,019	1.84	
Independent	Sardar Muhammad Akram Kakar	375	0.68	
BAP	Nawabzada Sher Shah Khan Jogezai	371	0.67	
Independent	Nawabzada Muhammad Ashraf Jogezai Kakar	250	0.45	
Independent	Rehmat Ullah	227	0.41	
Independent	Nawabzada Mohammad Amin Khan Jogezai	78	0.14	
JUI-S	Hamd Ullah	45	0.08	
BNP (M)	Khudai Dad Kakar	38	0.07	
Turnout		58,662	54.95	
Rejected ballots		3,297		
Majority		5,236	9.45	
Registered electors		106,752		

== See also ==
- PB-2 Zhob
- PB-4 Musakhel-cum-Barkhan
