= Badinzai railway station =

Railway station in Pakistan

Badinzai Railway Station بدین زئی ریلوے اسٹیشن

General information
- Coordinates: 31.1525°N 69.2825°E
- Owner: Ministry of Railways
- Line: Zhob Valley Railway

Other information
- Station code: BDZI

Services
Preceding station	Pakistan Railways	Following station
Alozai towards Bostan Junction	Zhob Valley Railway (defunct)	Zhob Terminus
Location

Badinzai Railway Station (Urdu: بدین زئی ریلوے اسٹیشن) is located in Pakistan.

== See also ==
- List of railway stations in Pakistan
- Pakistan Railways
