= Zhob Valley Railway =

Railway line in Pakistan

Zhob Valley Railway ژوب وادی ریلوے

Overview
- Status: Closed
- Owner: Pakistan Railways
- Termini: Bostan Junction; Zhob

Service
- Operator(s): Pakistan Railways

History
- Opened: 1929
- Closed: 1986

Technical
- Line length: 298 km (185 mi)
- Track gauge: 762 mm (2 ft 6 in)

The Zhob Valley Railway (Urdu: ژوب وادی ریلوے) was one of several branch lines in Pakistan, operated and maintained by Pakistan Railways. The line began at Bostan Junction and ended at Zhob. The total length of this railway line is 298 kilometers (185 mi) with 14 railway stations. Upon competition, the 762 mm (2 ft 6 in) railway became the longest narrow gauge system in the region.

== History ==
The Zhob Valley Railway was built in two sections between 1916 and 1920. The first section was built from Bostan Junction to Muslimbagh during World War I by the Balochistan Chrome Ore Company and opened in 1916. Muslimbagh had an abundance of Chromite which was transported by the railway to munitions production factories in the British Empire. The second section was built by the North Western State Railway as an extension from Muslimbagh to Fort Sandeman (now Zhob). Work began in 1920 and reached Qila Saifullah in 1927 and Zhob in 1930. The intent to extend the railway from Zhob to Bannu, but never materialized. At 2224 meters above sea level, Kan Mehtarzai railway station would become one of the highest narrow gauge railway stations in the world. During winter months, the line could be buried by snow.

=== Closure ===
The line was closed down in 1991 after successive operational losses and was later dismantled completely. Tracks coaches and other rolling stock remain at Bostan Junction with a depot and turntable as seen on Google Earth in 2023.

=== Revival ===
The line is proposed to be rebuilt as a 1,676 mm (5 ft 6 in) broad gauge line under the China-Pakistan Economic Corridor as part of a new railway link between Kotla Jam and Quetta.

== Stations ==
- Bostan Junction
- Khanai
- Churmian
- Kan Mehtarzai
- Muslimbagh
- Kila Saifullah
- Alozai
- Badinzai
- Zhob
