= Muhammad Khan Sherani =

Pakistani politician (born 1950)

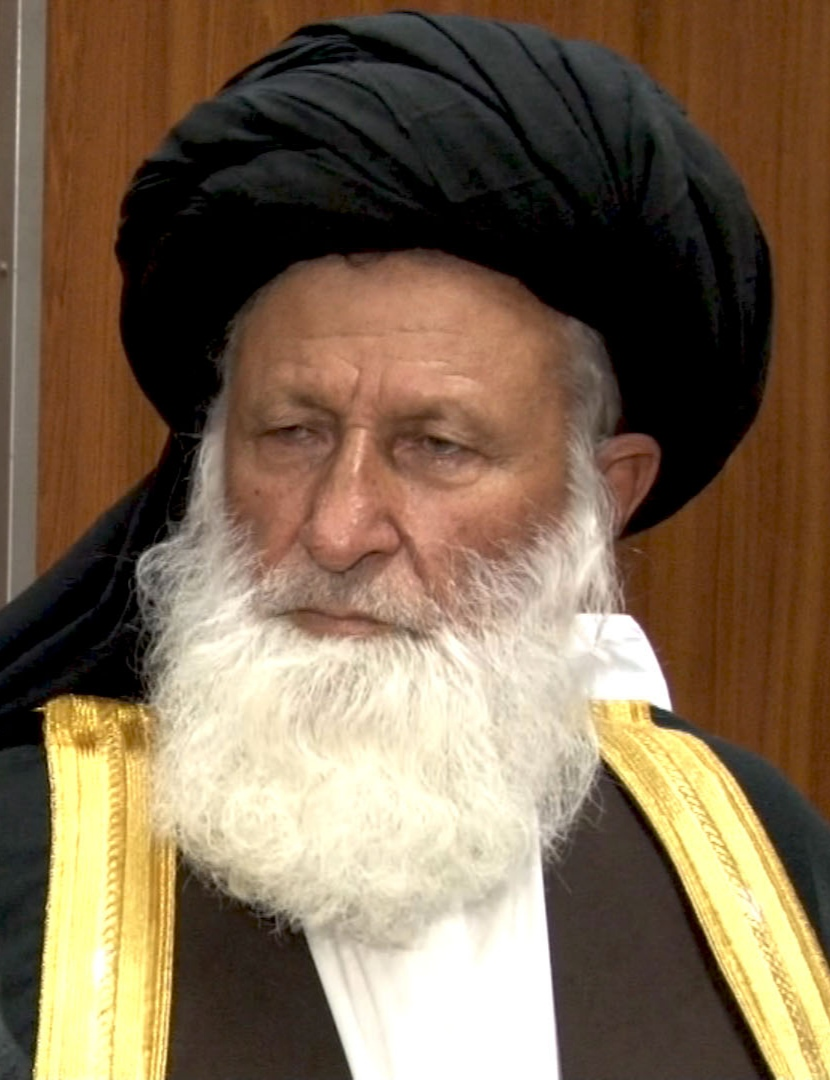

Chairman of the Council of Islamic Ideology
- In office 16 November 2010 – 17 November 2016
- Preceded by: Dr. Muhammad Khalid Masud
- Succeeded by: Dr. Qibla Ayaz

Member of the National Assembly of Pakistan
- In office 1 June 2013 – 31 May 2018
- Constituency: NA-264 (Zhob-cum-Sherani-cum-Killa Saifullah)
- In office 18 November 2002 – 18 November 2007
- Constituency: NA-264 (Zhob-cum-Killa Saifullah)
- In office 1 December 1988 – 12 October 1999
- Constituency: NA-200 (Zhob)

Personal details
- Born: 1948 (age 77–78) Zhob, Balochistan, Pakistan
- Party: Rabita Jamiat Ulema-e-Islam
- Other political affiliations: Jamiat Ulema-e-Islam (F) (1988-2020)
- Spouse: unknown (m. 2025)

Maulana Muhammad Khan Sherani (Pashto/Urdu: مولانا محمد خان شیرانی) is a Pakistani Islamic scholar and politician who established Rabita Jamiat Ulema-e-Islam the breakway faction of Jamiat Ulema-e-Islam (F) over rifts with (JUI-F) leader Fazal-ur-Rehman.

He had been a member of the National Assembly of Pakistan, between 1988 and May 2018. He was the Chairman of the influential Council of Islamic Ideology from 2010 to 2016.

== Early life and education ==
He was born in 1948/1951 into a Pashtun family of the Shirani tribe in Zhob, Balochistan.

His father Malik Masoom Khan was one of the sardars or leaders of the tribe who also used to deliver sermons at the local Jama Masjid, and following his father's wishes, after completing his early education he studied in many Islamic seminaries, including Madrasa Matta al Ulum, the Madrasa of Maulana Abdur Rahim, the Madrasa Darul Ulum Lakki Marwat, the Madrasa Waqia Nar of Malik Mahabat, the Madrasa Siraj ul Uloom Bannu and the Madrasa Qasim ul Uloom.

In 1961 he was involved in a tribal feud.

His early political and religious influences were Mufti Mehmood and Maulana Abdullah Darkhawasti.

== Political career ==
He was active in the Khatme Nabuwwat movement against the Ahmadiyya under Zulfikar Ali Bhutto and was later jailed under General Zia-ul-Haq's martial law.

He has served as the Former District Nazim Zhob District.

He was elected to the National Assembly of Pakistan as a candidate of Jamiat Ulema-e Islam (F) (JUI-F) from Constituency NA-200 Zhob in the 1988 Pakistani general election. He received 13,307 votes and defeated Maulvi Allah Dad, a candidate of Jamiat Ulema-e Islam (D).

He was re-elected to the National Assembly as a candidate of JUI-F from Constituency NA-200 Zhob in the 1990 Pakistani general election. He received 15,965 votes and defeated Nawab Muhammad Ayaz Khan Jogezai, a candidate of the Pashtunkhwa Milli Awami Party (PKMAP).

He ran for the seat of the National Assembly as a candidate of IJM from Constituency NA-200 Zhob in the 1993 Pakistani general election but was unsuccessful. He received 15,260 votes and lost the seat to Nawab Muhammad Ayaz Khan Jogezai, a candidate of the PKMAP.

He was re-elected to the National Assembly as a candidate of JUI-F from Constituency NA-200 (Zhob) in the 1997 Pakistani general election. He received 14,679 votes and defeated Nawab Muhammad Ayaz Khan Jogezai, a candidate of the PKMAP.

He was re-elected to the National Assembly as a candidate of Muttahida Majlis-e-Amal (MMA) from Constituency NA-264 (Zhob-cum-Killa Saifullah) in the 2002 Pakistani general election. He received 20,381 votes and defeated Nawab Muhammad Ayaz Khan Jogezai, a candidate of the PKMAP.

He ran for the seat of the National Assembly as a candidate of MMA from Constituency NA-264 (Zhob-cum-Sherani-cum-Killa Saifullah) in the 2008 Pakistani general election but was unsuccessful. He received 17,066 votes and lost the seat to Maulvi Asmatullah, an independent candidate.

He was elected to the Senate of Pakistan and was made chairman of the Council of Islamic Ideology with the status of federal minister in 2010 for three years. He was again made chairman of the Council of Islamic Ideology in 2013.

He has served as Federal Minister for Religious Affairs.

He was re-elected to the National Assembly as a candidate of JUI-F from Constituency NA-264 (Zhob-cum-Sherani-cum-Killa Saifullah) in the 2013 Pakistani general election. He received 30,870 votes and defeated Moulana Asmatullah, a candidate of Jamiat Ulama-e-Islam Nazryati.

=== Alliance with Imran Khan's PTI ===
On 13 June 2022, Sherani met with Imran Khan and declared an alliance with his party, the Pakistan Tehreek-e-Insaf.

Sherani also took to Twitter and said that when he asked Fazl ur-Rehman does he have proof that Imran Khan is a Jewish and Indian agent, Fazl responded with "it's just a political statement".

== See also ==
- List of Deobandis
