= PB-2 Zhob =

Constituency of the Provincial Assembly of Balochistan, Pakistan

- Constituency for the Provincial Assembly of Balochistan
- Region: Zhob District (partly)

Current constituency
- Party: Balochistan Awami Party
- Member: Mitha Khan Kakar
- Created from: PB-19 (Zhob-II)

PB-2 Zhob (پی بی-2 ژوب) is a constituency of the Provincial Assembly of Balochistan.

== General elections 2024 ==
Provincial election 2024: PB-2 Zhob
Party	Candidate	Votes	%	±%
JUI (F)	Fazal Qadir Mandokhail	11,783	33.62	
Independent	Mitha Khan Kakar	9,205	26.27	
PML(N)	Sheikh Jaffar Khan Mandokhail	7,653	21.84	
ANP	Allauddin	2,543	7.26	
PMAP	Jamal Muhammad	1,134	3.24	
Others	Others (twenty four candidates)	2,970	7.04	
Turnout		37,088	39.25	
Total valid votes		35,043	94.49	
Rejected ballots		2,045	5.51	
Majority		2,578	7.35	
Registered electors		94,502		
JUI (F) gain from PMAP				

== General elections 2018 ==
General elections were held on 25 July 2018.

General election 2018: PB-2 (Zhob)
Party	Candidate	Votes	%	±%
Independent	Mitta Khan Kakar	16,368	32.66	
Independent	Muhammad Nawaz	9,578	19.11	
PML(Q)	Jaffar Khan Mandokhel	8,511	16.98	
MMA	Gulab Khan	5,451	10.88	
PMAP	Raza Mohammad Raza	4,411	8.80	
PML(N)	Haji Jamal Shah Kakar	1,825	3.64	
ANP	Muhammad Anwar Mandokhail	1,516	3.02	
PTI	Samad Khan	664	1.32	
JUINP	Abdul Hameed	466	0.93	
Independent	Shah Zaman Kakar	341	0.68	
BAP	Shehbaz Khan Mandokhail	270	0.54	
Independent	Anwar Jan Kibzai	135	0.27	
Independent	Muhammad Aslam Mandokhail	126	0.25	
Independent	Baz Khan	96	0.19	
Independent	Bibi Jamila	70	0.14	
Independent	Noor Ul Amin	61	0.12	
Independent	Abdul Raheem	51	0.10	
Independent	Sohrab Khan	47	0.09	
Independent	Mehmood Khan Mandokhail	40	0.08	
Independent	Abdullah Khan	38	0.08	
Independent	Abdul Raheem Mandokhail	29	0.06	
PPP	Saif Ur Rehman Mardanzai	15	0.03	
Independent	Ameer Ullah Khan	12	0.02	
Turnout		54,769	44.55	
Rejected ballots		4,648		
Majority		6,790	13.55	
Registered electors		123,070		

== See also ==
- PB-1 Sherani-cum-Zhob
- PB-3 Killa Saifullah
