= Akram Dashti =

Pakistani politician

Ex Senator Akram Dashti

Member of the Senate of Pakistan
- In office March 2018 – March 2024
- Constituency: Balochistan

Personal details
- Party: National Party (NP)

Akram Dashti or Muhammad Akram (Urdu: محمد اکرم) is a Pakistani politician, an Ex member of the Senate of Pakistan and Ex Speaker Balochistan Assembly from 1989 to 1990 from Balochistan. He belongs to National Party (NP).

== Political career ==
Dashti was elected to the Senate of Pakistan as a candidate of National Party on general seat from Balochistan in the 2018 Pakistani Senate election And he was the speaker Balochistan Assembly 1989 to 1990 and Sport and culture Minister. He took oath as Senator on 12 March 2018.
