= Council of Islamic Ideology =

Pakistani constitutional advisory body

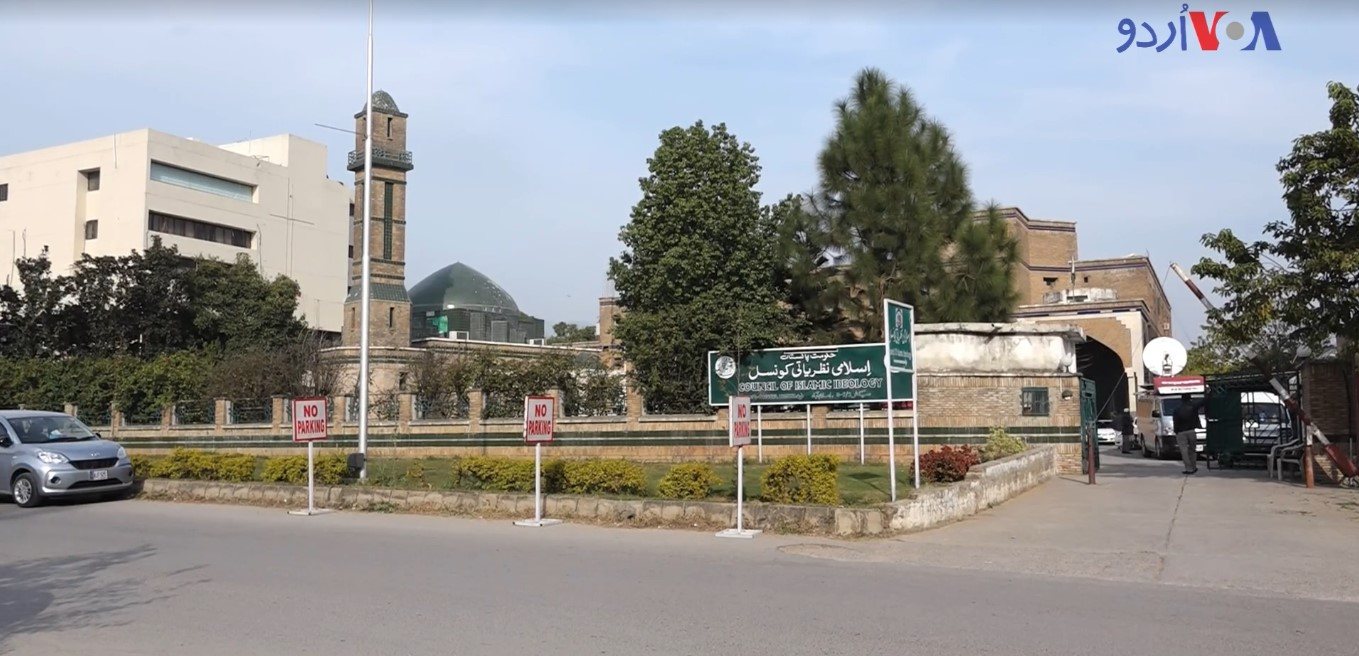
- Council of Islamic Ideology Pakistan

Constitutional body overview
- Formed: 1962; 64 years ago
- Headquarters: Islamabad
- Constitutional body executive: Allama Muhammad Raghib Hussain Naeemi, Chairman
- Website: www.cii.gov.pk

Council of Islamic Ideology (CII; Urdu: اِسلامی نظریاتی کونسل) is a constitutional body of Pakistan, responsible for giving legal advice on Islamic issues to the government and the Parliament.

This body was founded in 1962 under the government of Ayub Khan.

== Functions ==
The council has the following functions:

1. To recommend laws conforming to the Quran and the Sunnah to the Parliament and Provincial Assemblies.
2. To advise the Parliament, Government of Pakistan, President of Pakistan, or a provincial Governor on any question referred to the council as to whether a proposed law is or is not repugnant to the injunctions of Islam.
3. To make recommendations to bring current laws into conformity with Islamic injunctions.
4. To compile guidance for the Parliament and Provincial Assemblies.

However, the Government can make a law before advice is furnished by the council. The council is also responsible for submitting an annual interim report, which is discussed in the Parliament and Provincial Assemblies within six months of its receipt. Recently, the council was strongly criticized in many traditionalist quarters for its recommendations on the procedure for khula. (See also Talaq (conflict)).

== Views ==
- In 2013, the council ruled that DNA testing could not be used as a primary proof in rape cases, but could be used as a supplementary proof. They later said it can be used as the main evidence.
- The council also declared human cloning and sex reassignment surgery to be un-Islamic whereas test tube births were allowed, within certain conditions. It further stated that the practice of secret recordings as evidence for court cases should not be part of general policy, but could be allowed in selected cases.
- Regarding the existing law that requires a "written approval" from the first wife if a man wants a second marriage, the council is of the view that these laws are against Islamic principles and therefore should be abolished. Maulana Sheerani, the chairman of the council, said, "The government should amend the law to make the issue of more than one marriage easy and in accordance with Sharia. We urge the government to formulate Sharia-compliant laws related to nikah, divorce, adulthood and will." In spite of this recommendation from CII, in November 2017, a Lahore lower court ruled against a man who married a second woman without obtaining permission from his first wife. He was sentenced to a six-month jail term and fined Rs 2,00,000.
- In a review of marriage laws in March 2014, CII declared them un-Islamic. According to the council, there are two stages of a marriage, nikah and rukhsati. While nikah can be done at any age, rukhsati can only take place once she reaches the age of puberty and is the responsibility of her guardian.
- The council on 21 January 2019 ruled that talaq al-bid'ah (immediate divorce without a waiting period) is against the sunnah of Muhammad and it asked the government to make this act punishable. It also ruled that a woman older than 40 can serve as a judge.
- In November 2024, the council ruled against the usage of virtual private networks (VPN) as contrary to Sharia law amid efforts by the government to outlaw it. However, the council later clarified that the ruling on VPNs depended on the purpose they were used for, and said VPNs were not always un-Islamic.

== Chairmen ==
- Justice Abu Saleh Muhammad Akram (1 August 1962 - 5 February 1964)
- Prof. Allama Allauddin Siddiqui (6 February 1964 - 31 January 1973)
- Justice Hamoodur Rahman (2 February 1974 - 1 February 1977)
- Justice Mohammad Afzal Cheema (26 September 1977 - 16 May 1980)
- Justice Tanzil-ur-Rahman (27 May 1980 - 30 May 1984)
- Prof. A.W.J. Halepota (7 May 1986 - 6 May 1989)
- Justice Mohammad Haleem (25 February 1990 - 24 February 1993)
- Maulana Kausar Niazi (15 December 1993 - 19 March 1994)
- Iqbal Ahmad Khan (11 June 1994 - 10 June 1997)
- S.M. Zaman (10 September 1997 - 16 October 2003)
- Dr. Muhammad Khalid Masud (16 June 2004 - 14 June 2010)
- Maulana Muhammad Khan Sherani (16 November 2010 - 17 November 2016)
- Dr. Qibla Ayaz (6 November 2017 – 21 May 2024)
- Dr. Raghib Hussain Naeemi (21 May 2024 – present)

== Current members ==
- Qibla Ayaz
- Arif Hussain Wahidi
- Naseem Ali Shah
- Syed Iftikhar Hussain Naqvi
- Abdul Hakeem Akbari
- Pir Fazeel
- Dr. Qari Abdul Rasheed (T.I)
- Syed Muhammad Anwer
- Fazal-ur-Rahim
- Muhammad Raza Khan
- Manzoor Hussain Gillani
- Muhammad Hanif Jalandhari
- Muhammad Raghib Hussain Naeemi
- Shafiqur Rehman Pasruri
- Abul Muzaffar Ghulam Muhammad Sialvi
- Ahmed Javed
- Khurshid Ahmad Nadeem
- Malik Allah Buksh Kalyar
- Rooh-ul-Husnain Mueen
- Farkhanda Zia
- Sahibzada Sajid-ur-Rehman

== First members ==
The council was originally known as the Advisory Council of Islamic Ideology. Its first nine members were:

- Justice Abu Saleh Muhammad Akram, former judge of Federal Court of Pakistan (Chairman)
- Justice Muhammad Sharif, former Judge Supreme Court of Pakistan
- Mohammad Abdul Ghafoor Hazarvi, Punjab, Pakistan
- Mohmmad Akram Khan;
- Abdul Hamid Badayuni, Karachi
- Hafiz Kifayat Husain, Lahore
- Maulana Abdullah, Islamabad.
- Dr. Ishtiaq Hussain Qureshi, Head, Islamic Research Institute, Karachi
- Abdul Hashim, Islamic Academy, Dhaka
- Another member from East Pakistan;
- Syed Falah-Ud-Din Hashmi ( Assigned to Denmark )
- Syed Najmul Hassan Kararvi

== See also ==
- Federal Shariat Court
- Human Rights Commission of Pakistan
- Marriage in Pakistan
- Polygyny in Islam
