= Khuda Babar =

Pakistani politician

Member of the Senate of Pakistan
- Incumbent
- Assumed office 12 March 2018

Personal details
- Party: BAP (2023-present)
- Other political affiliations: IND (2018-2023)

Kauda Babar is a Pakistani politician who has been a Member of the Senate of Pakistan, since March 2018. He also served as an advisor to CM Balochistan for Gwadar Development Authority from January 2018 to March 2018.

== Political career ==
Babar was elected to the Senate of Pakistan as an independent candidate on general seat from Balochistan in the 2018 Pakistani Senate election. He took oath as Senator on 12 March 2018.
