= Kharqamar incident =

2019 shooting on PTM activists by the Armed Forces

Kharqamar Incident
- Map of North Waziristan
- Native name: د خړکمر خونړۍ پېښه
- Location: Kharqamar, Datta Khel Subdivision, North Waziristan, Khyber Pakhtunkhwa, Pakistan
- Date: May 26, 2019; 7 years ago (21 Ramadan 1440 AH); 9:30 a.m. (PST, UTC+05:00)
- Attack type: Mass shooting
- Deaths: 15 protesters (PTM claim)
- Injuries: Over 40 protesters (PTM claim); 15 injured, including 5 soldiers (security forces' claim)

The Kharqamar incident (Pashto: د خړکمر خونړۍ پېښه; Urdu: واقعہ خڑکمر) took place on 26 May 2019 when security forces shot activists of the Pashtun Tahafuz Movement (PTM), who were holding a protest gathering near Kharqamar check post in North Waziristan, Khyber Pakhtunkhwa, Pakistan. To stop the demonstration, the corps killed at least 13 PTM supporters and injured over 25 others. The paramilitary forces said PTM members attacked security forces before any shooting began and injured several soldiers, but the there was little evidence to contradict the witness accounts and videos, that largely pointed to the contrary. Several PTM activists, including two members of the National Assembly of Pakistan, Ali Wazir and Mohsin Dawar, were arrested by the security forces after the incident and curfew was imposed in the area. Dawar, representative of North Waziristan in the National Assembly, said the gathering had been organized by peaceful and unarmed activists to protest against the alleged beating up of a woman by the military on May 25 and other human rights abuses in the area. The paramilitary forces alleged that the PTM leaders wanted to exert pressure for release of suspected terrorists’ facilitators, but PTM leaders denied this charge.

Latif Afridi, the Peshawar High Court Bar President and former parliamentarian who was leading the panel of lawyers representing Wazir and Dawar in the court, argued that several videos showed that Wazir, Dawar, and other protesters were unarmed but the security personnel started unprovoked firing, resulting into deaths of peaceful protesters. According to ARY News and other Pakistani media, however, some videos showed that Wazir was inciting the crowd to attack the military check post. The media also said the security guards of Dawar were armed.

A day after this incident, the opposition walked out of the National Assembly of Pakistan to protest against this violent incident. The opposition parties, including the Pakistan Peoples Party (PPP) and the Pakistan Muslim League (PMLN), questioned the silence of prime minister Imran Khan on the incident and called for resolving the issue by the civilians through the parliament. However, Iftikhar Chaudhry, the deputy secretary of information for the ruling Pakistan Tehreek-e-Insaf (PTI), said "PTM constitutes terrorists who do not respect the constitution." Asad Qaiser, the Speaker of the National Assembly, was asked by the opposition to produce Wazir and Dawar before the parliament so that they could explain their viewpoint about the incident at the parliament sessions. The speaker issued similar production orders for the parliamentarians Asif Ali Zardari and Khawaja Saad Rafique, both arrested in corruption cases, but refused to issue production orders for Wazir and Dawar. On June 12, when the speaker was asked why he could not issue production orders for Wazir and Dawar, he replied he did "not have the ability to do so." On June 23, a fact-finding team of the Human Rights Commission of Pakistan was stopped by the military from reaching Kharqamar and prevented from investigating about the incident.

After almost four months in jail, Wazir and Dawar were released on bail on 21 September 2019. On 14 October 2020, the government withdrew the Kharqamar case against PTM, and Wazir and Dawar were acquitted of the charges against them.

== Background ==
The Pashtun Tahafuz Movement (PTM) is a rights group that campaigns for accountability for alleged human rights violations committed by the Pakistan Civil Armed Forces. Since its beginning in February 2018, the PTM had faced arbitrary detentions, treason charges against its leaders, and a blanket ban on media coverage of its events in Pakistan. Less than one month before the Kharqamar incident, the military spokesperson Asif Ghafoor, in a forceful statement, accused the PTM of being "funded by foreign intelligence agencies" and threatened the PTM with bitter consequences.

During his press conference on 29 April 2019, Asif Ghafoor warned the PTM: "We want to do everything for the people [of tribal areas], but those who are playing in the hands of people, their time is up. Their time is up."

== The Incident ==
On 26 May 2019, Ali Wazir and Mohsin Dawar led a group of PTM activists to the Kharqamar area of North Waziristan to lead a protest and investigate allegations of paramilitary rights abuses. Several videos from the scene, before and after the firing, showed that the protesters were unarmed. Video footage showed Wazir and Dawar were stopped by the security forces at a checkpoint, where they and other PTM supporters argued with the soldiers who would not let them pass, but they eventually crossed two barriers. One video showed that as the convoy crossed the checkpoint, Wazir was received with a garland of flowers by the protesters, when shooting erupted and the crowd around him dispersed.

The Pakistani military, on the other hand, claimed that a group led by PTM leaders Wazir and Dawar assaulted on check post. However, eyewitnesses and PTM activists rejected this version. They claimed that the army tried to suppress their dissents voices for rights of Pashtuns.

An eyewitness, Rahim Dawar, told Voice of America Deewa: “I saw at least two dozen people that were hurt. For an hour, no one helped us. We were trying to pick up the injured when three army vehicles came and took the wounded away”. Local media, reported that Wazir provoked the protesters to attack the military check post and that Dawar's security guards were armed.

The military arrested Wazir and eight others on the spot. On the following day a curfew and Section 144 of the Criminal Procedure Code was imposed in Waziristan. On 30 May, Dawar also presented himself in front of law and was sent to jail, after spending almost four days in hiding. Before his surrender, Dawar said in a video message that his life was in "extreme danger" due to the security forces raids. "I present myself before any court of law in Pakistan for accountability, but the military should be presented as well. We want an investigation of this incident in whatever court they are ready to accept."

=== PTM claim ===
Mohsin Dawar claimed that the 26 May gathering at Kharqamar was originally held to protest against alleged human rights abuses in the area by military forces one day earlier, but paramilitary forces were allegedly trying to block them from doing the demonstration. He claimed that, “they beat up a woman and picked up some other people yesterday [May 25]. We were going to protest that incident when they opened fire on us.” Dawar said that "as the only elected representative of the region that includes the village, I felt obligated to reach out to my constituents, support their protest, and help their voices be heard. With this in mind, on May 26, I visited the village with another member of the national assembly, Ali Wazir, who is also part of PTM." When the PTM activists reached the check post, the military refused to let them pass. As the allegedly unarmed protesters chanted slogans and finally passed the checkpost, the military directly opened fire on them.

Dawar told Al Jazeera: "At the village, we [Mohsin Dawar and Ali Wazir] were welcomed by a jubilant crowd of around 200 to 300 people. They garlanded us and together we started walking towards the sit-in area. However, the soldiers at the checkpoint refused to allow us to join the protesters. Tempers were raised, but I did my best to reason with the soldiers and convince them to let us through. But as soon as we went past the check post, I heard gunshots. Initially, I thought the soldiers manning the checkpoint were firing warning shots in the air. But the sounds of occasional gun shots suddenly turned into the staccato of automatic fire, and villagers around me started to fall. Someone pushed me to the ground and I was dragged into a ravine. When I looked back, I saw blood-soaked bodies lying motionless on the ground and heard the cries for help of the injured. Later we learned that 15 people were killed and more than 40 were injured as a result of the unprovoked attack" he claimed.

He continued that "Wazir and eight others were arrested on the spot, but I [Mohsin Dawar] managed to escape the scene, with the help of other survivors. For the next three days, we walked through the villages of Daigan, Mohammad Khel, and Hamzoni to get to my village, Darpa Khel, near Miranshah, which is approximately 30km from the site of the massacre. Throughout our journey, we staged several protests to inform the public about the massacre and demand accountability. When we reached Darpa Khel, we started another sit-in. The military, meanwhile, imposed a curfew on the village of Doga Macha Mada Khel that lasted for eight days, and also surrounded my village. I eventually chose to surrender to the authorities in the town of Bannu because I was scared for the lives of the people in my village."

=== Pakistan Armed Forces claim ===
The Inter-Services Public Relations (ISPR) of the Pakistan Armed Forces said that security forces in the area had been regularly targeted by militants. An army operation had been launched on May 24 to eliminate militants and insurgents from the area. During the operation, a soldier was wounded and two suspected terrorists were arrested. Residents of the Doga Macha Madakhel village started protesting against the detentions of two people. A protest was going on in the area when on 26 May, Wazir and Dawar, two elected representatives from Waziristan in the Pakistani parliament, tried to join the protesters, but they were stopped at Kharqamar check post by the Pakistan Army. According to the military, the demonstrators turned violent and started intense stone pelting and gun shots at the check post. The soldiers had opened warning shots to calm the situation. The clash had later turned fierce and as a result, casualties occurred. According to the initial press release of the ISPR, three people were killed and 15 including were injured, including 5 soldiers. The it was claimed that the aim of PTM was to assert pressure on authorities for the release of suspected facilitators of terrorists. The government reports had blamed Wazir and Dawar for inciting attack.

== Investigation ==
According to Pakistan Army Act, 'if an army check post is assaulted, the troops are legally allowed to respond to the attack and those who are responsible for the attack will be tired by the military courts.' A deputy commissioner of North Waziristan alleged that PTM leaders Ali Wazir and Mohsin Dawar were responsible for the Kharqamar incident.

On 14 October 2020, after the group accepted an offer to enter talks with the government while calling for "confidence-building measures to demonstrate sincerity", the government withdrew the Kharqamar case against PTM at the anti-terrorism court of Bannu, and Wazir and Dawar were acquitted of all charges.

== Reactions ==
=== Public ===
Immediately after the incident, people in Miramshah, capital of North Waziristan, poured into streets to protest against these killings. They furiously demanded investigation into the massacre. Many protests were reported in different cities of Balochistan and Khyber Pakhtunkhwa. Also in Pakistani Azad Kashmir, youth protested against this incident and they called for release of Ali Wazir, Mohsin Dawar, and other PTM activists. Despite the ban on activities, many protested in front of Scouts Fort in Wanna, South Waziristan. Similarly, many PTM activists were detained in Bannu for organizing protests.

=== Human rights organizations ===
Manzoor Pashteen, chairman of PTM, said "this is a follow up of [military spokesman Asif Ghafoor’s] threat of ‘time is up'," as the military had warned the PTM the previous month that the movement's actions would be no longer tolerated. Referring to the crackdown against PTM and the detention of several PTM activists following the incident, Pashteen said: “In the past, they (the armed forces) wanted to stop protests. Now they want to stop the movement. They have directly arrested the leadership and begun a campaign to malign them [on social media].”

Amnesty International strongly condemned this attack and called upon Pakistani authorities to have an impartial investigation. Its press release said:

Under international law, lethal force can only ever be used by law enforcement authorities when strictly necessary to protect life. When lethal force has been used, every incident should be fully investigated to determine if there was any use of excessive force and if any resulting killing was unlawful. Those found responsible for the use of excessive force or for unlawful killings should be brought to justice through fair trials without resort to the death penalty.

The Human Rights Commission of Pakistan (HRCP) also condemned this incident and demanded investigation, setting up of a parliamentary commission, and immediate release of all detained activists. In a press release, it said:

There must be a serious attempt to genuinely address the grievances of the local population, which the PTM has been articulating peacefully for well over a year. Moreover, with the passage of the 26th Constitutional Amendment, the state must ensure that the media and civil society have independent access to the former FATA. The country’s mainstream media must also understand its responsibility to report on this region fairly.

Europe Solidaire Sans Frontières launched an international call for the release of Ali Wazir and Mohsin Dawar and withdrawal of false cases against them.

South Asians for Human Rights (SAHR) also expressed its discontent on the incident and stated in its press release:

SAHR calls upon the government of Pakistan to conduct an effective and independent investigation over the reported killing of the activists. SAHR urges the relevant authorities to respect the fundamental human rights of the people in Waziristan including the recognition of their genuine demands that are within the parameter of rights guaranteed under the Constitution. We call on the Pakistan government to immediately release Ali Wazir and Mohsin Dawar, the elected representatives of the people of Waziristan, and other protesters arrested at the protest site.

=== Opposition parties in Pakistan ===
Pakistan Peoples Party's (PPP) chairperson Bilawal Bhutto demanded production orders for the National Assembly members Ali Wazir and Mohsin Dawar. He said the production orders should be issued immediately so that they could attend Friday's session and present their viewpoint. On May 31, 2019, Bilawal said he had written a letter to Asad Qaiser demanding the production orders, but despite having evidence that the letter had been received, he was "lied to and told that they did not get this letter." A delegation of PPP, led by former Prime Minister of Pakistan Raja Pervaiz Ashraf, also officially requested the National Assembly Speaker for issuing the production orders.

Pakistan Muslim League's (PML-N) Vice-President Maryam Nawaz strongly condemned the incident and asked for an investigation so that the facts could be made public. She asked: "Have we not already paid tremendously for crushing protests and suppressing voices?" The PML-N President Shehbaz Sharif and the former Defence Minister of Pakistan Khawaja Muhammad Asif also expressed grief over the incident. Rana Sanaullah, the former Law Minister of Punjab, said “if it has not been in his [Asad Qaiser's] capacity to issue order of production of Ali Wazir and Mohsin Dawar, then he should immediately resign.” Shahid Khaqan Abbasi, a PML-N leader and former Prime Minister of Pakistan, also urged the speaker to issue production orders for Wazir and Dawar.

Jamiat Ulema-e-Islam's (JUI-F) chief Maulana Fazal-ur-Rehman condemned the incident while speaking to media in Peshawar. He said: ”Peaceful protest is the right of each and every citizen. Trying to bar this would only lead to increasing resentment.”

The Pashtunkhwa Milli Awami Party (PMAP) senator Usman Kakar demanded the formation of a "parliamentary commission" to find facts about the incident. The Awami National Party (ANP) also demanded that the incident should be transparently probed through a judicial commission or parliamentary committee.

== Compensation ==
On June 1, 2019, the Chief Minister of Khyber Pakhtunkhwa, Mahmood Khan, announced a financial package of Rs2.5 million for the families of the people killed in the Kharqamar incident and Rs1 million to those injured in the incident.

== See also ==
- 1993 UN killings of Somali protestors
