= Muslim Bagh =

Muslim Bagh مسلم باغ
- City
- Location within Balochistan, Pakistan Location within Pakistan
- Coordinates: 30°49′31″N 67°44′8″E
- Country: Pakistan
- Province: (Balochistan, Pakistan) Balochistan
- District: Killa Saifullah
- Elevation: 1,787 m (5,863 ft)

Population (2023)
  - City: 29,132
- Time zone: UTC+5 (PST)
- Postal code: 85500
- Highways: N-50

Muslim Bagh (Pashto/Urdu: مسلم باغ), is a town in Killa Saifullah District, Balochistan, Pakistan. It is located at an altitude of 1,787 metres (5,863 ft). According to the Census of 2023, the population of Muslim Bagh is 29,132 (male 14,464 and female 14,668), with 83,795 people in the Muslim Bagh tehsil. The Muslim Bagh ophiolite is the richest in chromite occurrence among all ophiolites within Pakistan.

Muslim Bagh was formerly called Hindu Bagh; that name is believed to be a reference to an orchard planted by a Hindu saint in ages past.

== Demographics ==
=== Population ===
Historical population
Year	Pop.	±% p.a.
1951	...	—
1961	2,217	—
1972	2,694	+1.79%
1981	...	—
1998	17,170	—
2017	28,428	+2.69%
2023	29,132	+0.41%

As of the 2023 census, Muslim Bagh had a population of 29,132.

== Notable people ==
- Usman Khan Kakar
- Arfa Siddiq
- Anwar ul Haq Kakar
- Khushal Khan Kakar
- Maulana Noorullah
