= Naseebullah Bazai =

Pakistani politician (died 2026)

- نصیب اللہ بازئی

Member of the Senate of Pakistan
- In office 12 March 2018 – March 2024

Personal details
- Party: BAP (2023–2026)
- Other political affiliations: IND (2018–2023)

Naseebullah Bazai (Urdu: نصیب اللہ بازئی; died September 2026) was a Pakistani politician who was a Member of the Senate of Pakistan from March 2018 to March 2024.

== Life and career ==
Bazai was elected to the Senate of Pakistan as an independent candidate on a technocrat seat from Balochistan in the 2018 Pakistani Senate election. He took his oath as Senator on 12 March 2018. Bazai died in September 2026.
