= Babu China =

- Location within Pakistan
- Coordinates: 31.2°N 67.51°E
- Country: Pakistan
- Province: Balochistan
- District: Killa Saifullah District
- Time zone: UTC+5 (PST)

Babu China is a town and Union Council, located in the Killa Saifullah District of Balochistan state in Pakistan. It lies close to the southernmost Pakistani border with Afghanistan.
