= Muhammad Khalid Masud =

Scholar of Islam

Chairman of the Council of Islamic Ideology
- In office 16 June 2004 – 14 June 2010
- Preceded by: S.M. Zaman
- Succeeded by: Muhammad Khan Sherani

Personal details
- Born: 15 April 1939 (age 87)
- Education: PhD in Islamic Studies
- Alma mater: McGill University, Montreal

Muhammad Khalid Masud (born 15 April 1939) is the Director General of Islamic Research Institute, International Islamic University, Islamabad, Pakistan. The President of Pakistan appointed Mr. Masud as an Ad Hoc Member of Shariat Appellate Bench of the Supreme Court on 18 October 2012. On 1 November 2012, he took the oath administered by Chief Justice of Pakistan as an Ad Hoc Member of Shariat Appellate Bench of Supreme Court of Pakistan. Formerly he was Chairman (2004–2010) of the Council of Islamic Ideology in Pakistan.

== Early life ==
Masud obtained his PhD in Islamic Studies at McGill University, Montreal, Canada. Previously he worked as the Academic Director of the 'International Institute for the study of Islam in the Modern World' (ISIM) in Leiden, Netherlands. Until 1999, he was a professor at the Islamic Research Institute in Islamabad (Pakistan). His publications include Shatibi's Philosophy of Law (rev. ed. 1995), Iqbal's Reconstruction of Ijtihad (1995), Islamic Legal Interpretation: The Muftis and their Fatwas (with B. Messick and D. Powers, 1996), and the edited volume Travellers in Faith: Studies of the Tablîghî Jamâ'at as a Transnational Islamic Movement for Faith Renewal (2000). He has been an editor of the journal Islamic Studies.

== Career ==
He has worked and taught at the following institutions as:

- Professor: Islamic Research Institute, International Islamic University, Islamabad.
- Senior Lecturer: Centre for Islamic Legal Studies, Ahmadu Bello University, Zaria, Nigeria
- Fulbright Fellow: University of Pennsylvania, United States.
- Lecturer: École des Haute Études Sciences Sociales, Paris, France.
- Professor: Collège de France, Paris.
- Professor: Leiden University, Netherlands
- Academic Director: International Institute for the Study of Islam in the Modern World, Leiden, Netherlands.
- Visiting Professor: Faculty of Law, International Islamic University, Kuala Lumpur, Malaysia

Authored, edited and co-edited a number of books such as:

- Muhsin-i A'zam (1963)
- Islamic Legal Philosophy (1977)
- Iqbal's concept of Ijtihad (1975)
- Shatibi's Philosophy of Islamic Law (1996)
- Iqbal's Reconstruction of Ijtihad (1995) (Iqbal Academy Pakistan)
- Islamic Legal Interpretation: Muftis And Their Fatwas (1996) (Oxford University Press)
- Muslim Jurists' Quest for the Normative Basis of Shariah (Leiden : ISIM)

He has edited and coedited:

- Islamic Legal Interpretations (Harvard, 1996)
- Travellers in Faith (Brill, 2000)
- Dispensing Justice in Islam: Qadis and Their Judgements (Brill 2006)
- Islam and Modernity: Key Issues and Debates (Edinburgh University Press: Edinburgh 2009)

Authored around ninety-five research articles, chapters and encyclopedia articles published in journals of international repute; included as chapters in books edited at el or co-authored and/or in Encyclopedias.
