= Mehmood Mandviwalla =

Pakistani lawyer

Provincial Minister of Sindh
- In office 2013–2013

Personal details
- Relations: Saleem Mandviwalla (cousin)

Mehmood Mandviwalla is a Pakistani lawyer and former caretaker Provincial Minister of Sindh who served in 2013 caretaker ministry.

He is a cousin of Saleem Mandviwalla.

== Education ==
He holds a degree in LLB (Hons) from the London School of Economics.
