= Shuja ul Mulk =

Pakistani politician

Shuja ul Mulk MNA

Member of the National Assembly of Pakistan
- In office 2002–2007
- Constituency: NA-9 (Mardan I)

Personal details
- Born: Mardan, Khyber Pakhtunkhwa, Pakistan
- Party: Rabita Jamiat Ulema-e-Islam
- Education: Government Post Graduate College Mardan
- Occupation: Politician

Shuja ul Mulk is a Pakistani politician who had been a member of the National Assembly of Pakistan from 2002 to 2007.
