= Fazal Qadir Mandokhail =

Pakistani politician

Member of the Provincial Assembly of Balochistan
- Incumbent
- Assumed office 29 February 2024
- Constituency: PB-2 Zhob

Personal details
- Born: Zhob District, Balochistan, Pakistan, Date of Birth 01/01/1965
- Political party: JUI (F) (2024-present)

Fazal Qadir Mandokhail is a Pakistani politician from Zhob District. He is currently serving as a member of the Provincial Assembly of Balochistan since February 2024.

== Career ==
He contested the 2024 general elections as a Jamiat Ulema-e-Islam (F) candidate from PB-2 Zhob. He secured 11453 votes while his runner-up was Mitha Khan Kakar who secured 9115 votes.
