= A. S. M. Akram =

Justice A.S.M. Akram
- আবু ছালেহ মোহাম্মদ আকরম
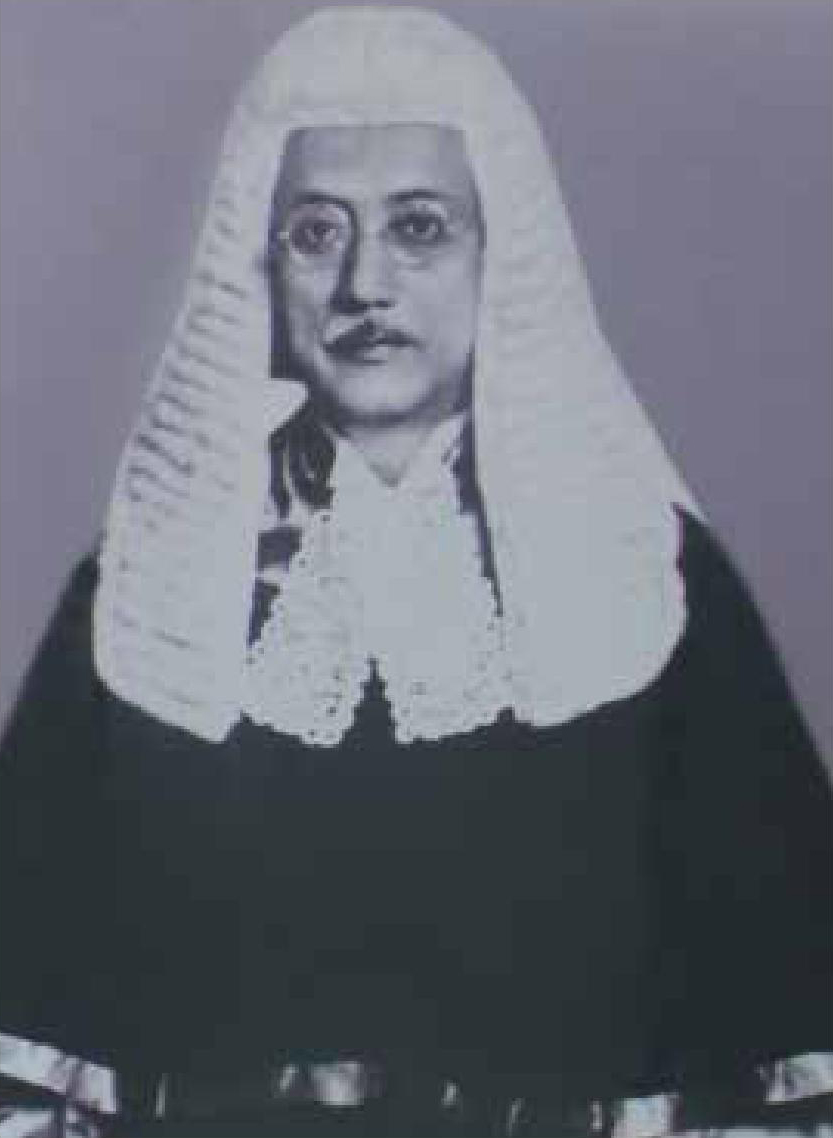
- Born: 1888; Calcutta, Bengal, British India
- Died: 1968 (aged 79–80); Lahore, Punjab, Pakistan
- Other name: Justice A.S.M. Akram
- Occupation: Jurist
- Known for: Chief Justice of Dacca High Court

Abu Saleh Muhammad Akram, better known as A.S.M. Akram, or Justice A.S.M. Akram (Bengali: বিচারপতি এ.এস.এম আকরাম, 1888–1968) was the first Chief Justice of Dacca High Court and a former judge of the Federal Court of Pakistan (now the Supreme Court of Pakistan).

== Bengal Boundary Commission ==
Akram was one of the two members from Pakistan at the Bengal Boundary Commission for the Radcliff Award in June 1947.

== Pakistan ==
=== East Pakistan ===
Akram was appointed the first Chief Justice of the Dacca High Court after it was created in 1947.

=== Federal Court of Pakistan ===
In 1951, Akram became a judge of the Federal Court of Pakistan. In 1954 he was in line to succeed the retiring Chief Justice, Abdul Rashid but stood aside under pressure from Governor-General Ghulam Muhammad, and Justice Muhammad Munir was appointed instead.

In 1952, he led an inquiry against Khan Najaf Khan, a police official, in connection with the assassination of Pakistan's first Prime Minister, Liaquat Ali Khan.

=== Council of Islamic Ideology ===
Akram became the first chairman of the Council of Islamic Ideology, serving from 1 August 1962 to 5 February 1964.

== Death ==
Akram died in Lahore in April 1968.
