= Bahramand Tangi =

Pakistani politician

Ex Senator Bahramand Tangi

Member of the Senate of Pakistan
- In office 12 March 2018 – 12 March 2024

Personal details
- Other political affiliations: PPP (2018-2024)

Bahramand Tangi is a Pakistani politician who was Member of the Senate of Pakistan from March 2018 to March 2024.

== Political career ==
Tangi was elected to the Senate of Pakistan as a candidate of Pakistan Peoples Party (PPP) on general seat from Khyber Pakhtunkhwa in the 2018 Pakistani Senate election. He took oath as Senator on 12 March 2018.

In 2023, he submitted a resolution to the Senate seeking the disqualification from holding any public office for 10 years for individuals involved in spreading "negative and malicious propaganda" against the Armed Forces and advocated for severe punishment against those engaged in anti-army propaganda. Eventually, the Senate passed the resolution.

In February 2024, PPP revoked Tangi basic membership from the party, due to his breach of party discipline. Reportedly, Tangi failed to respond to a show-cause notice regarding his silence on a resolution proposing a delay in the 2018 Pakistani general election.

In March 2024, a week prior to his retirement from the Senate, he proposed a resolution in the Senate calling for a permanent ban on all social media platforms, including Facebook, TikTok, Instagram, Twitter, and YouTube. The resolution highlighted that the utilization of these online platforms for spreading "negative and malicious propaganda" against the armed forces was deemed detrimental to the nation's interests. The PPP disassociated itself from Tangi's resolution, emphasizing that he should refrain from associating the party's name with his actions. Additionally, the party stated that it no longer had any affiliation with Tangi.
