= Qibla Ayaz =

Chairman of the Council of Islamic Ideology

Dr. Qibla Ayaz

Chairman of the Council of Islamic Ideology
- In office 6 November 2017 – 21st May 2024
- Preceded by: Muhammad Khan Sherani
- Succeeded by: Muhammad Raghib Hussain Naeemi

Personal details
- Born: 6 October 1953 (age 72) Bannu, Khyber Pakhtunkhwa
- Education: Masters in Islamic Studies; PhD in Islamic and Middle Eastern Studies
- Alma mater: University of Peshawar; University of Edinburgh

Qibla Ayaz is a scholar of Islamic Studies from Pakistan. He was the chairman of the Council of Islamic Ideology (CII).

== Early life ==
He was born on 6 October 1953 in Bannu, Khyber Pakhtunkhwa, Pakistan.

== Education ==
After earning his Masters in Islamic Studies from the University of Peshawar in 1975, in which he will serve as vice-chancellor later, he got his PhD from the University of Edinburgh in the field of Islamic and Middle Eastern Studies in 1985, his unpublished thesis being, in 2 volumes, An unexploited source for the History of the Saljūqs: A translation of and critical commentary on the Akhbār Al-Dawlat Al-Sajūqiyya, under the supervision of Dr Carole Hillenbrand.

== Judicial career ==
On 14 June 2024, Dr. Qibla Ayaz was appointed as ad-hoc member of Supreme Court's Shariat Appellate Bench for a period of three years.

== Publications ==
He has published 5 books and more than 20 research articles.
