= Rabita Jamiat Ulema-e-Islam =

Political party in Pakistan

- Abbreviation: RJUI
- Leader: Muhammad Khan Sherani
- Ameer: Shuja ul Mulk
- Founder: Muhammad Khan Sherani
- Founded: 29 December 2020; 5 years ago
- Registered: 20 September 2022
- Split from: Jamiat Ulema-e-Islam (F)
- Headquarters: Zhob, Balochistan, Pakistan
- Ideology: Islamism; Pan-Islamism; Clericalism; Social conservatism
- Political position: Far-right
- Religion: Sunni Islam (Deobandi)
- National affiliation: Tehreek Tahafuz Ayin
- Colors: Black & white

Election symbol
- Ring

Party flag

Rabita Jamiat Ulema-e-Islam (RJUI) is a Deobandi Islamist political party in Pakistan. It was established on 29 December 2020 as a breakway faction of Jamiat Ulema-e-Islam (F) (JUI-F), which was led by Fazl-ur-Rehman. The founder of the RJUI is Muhammad Khan Sherani and the Ameer of the party is Shuja ul Mulk. The party was registered with the Election Commission of Pakistan on 20 September 2022. On 31 March 2021, Sherani met Fazl-ur-Rehman to inquire about his health and make suggestions to resolve the differences between their parties. "If Fazl acts on our suggestions, we will join him again," Sherani said.

== Alliance with Imran Khan's PTI ==
On 13 June 2022, Sherani met with Imran Khan and declared an alliance with his party, the Pakistan Tehreek-e-Insaf.

Sherani also took to Twitter and said that when he asked Fazl ur-Rehman does he have proof that Imran Khan is a Jewish and Indian agent, the latter responded with "it's just a political statement".

== See also ==
- Jamiat Ulema-e-Islam
- Jamiat Ulema-e-Islam (F)
- List of Deobandi organisations
