= Saleem Mandviwalla =

Pakistani politician

Deputy Chairman of the Senate of Pakistan
- In office 12 March 2018 – 12 March 2021
- Chairman: Sadiq Sanjrani
- Preceded by: Abdul Ghafoor Haideri
- Succeeded by: Mirza Muhammad Afridi

Minister of Finance, Revenue & Economic Affairs
- In office 19 February 2013 – 7 June 2013
- Prime Minister: Raja Pervaiz Ashraf; Mir Hazar Khan Khoso
- Preceded by: Abdul Hafeez Shaikh
- Succeeded by: Ishaq Dar

Member of the Senate of Pakistan
- Incumbent
- Assumed office 8 November 2012
- Constituency: Sindh

Personal details
- Born: 25 January 1959 (age 67) Karachi, Sindh, Pakistan
- Party: PPP (2012-present)
- Relations: Mehmood Mandviwalla (cousin)
- Education: Fort Worth School of Aviation

Senator Saleem H. Mandviwalla (born 25 January 1959) is a Pakistani politician who served as deputy chairman of the Senate of Pakistan from March 2018 to March 2021. He was previously the president of the Board of Investment and Minister of State for Investment of Pakistan from October 2008 to May 2013. Prior to his appointment, he was the president of the Lasbela Chamber of Commerce & Industry in Lasbela, Balochistan.

Mandviwalla was unanimously elected as chairperson for Senate's Standing Committee on Finance, Revenue, Economic Affairs, Statistics and Privatisation.

Mandviwalla elected Vice Chairman of Senate of Pakistan on March 12, 2018, with 54 votes out of total 103 votes cast and defeated Usman Khan Kakar who secured only 44 votes.

== Early life and education ==
Mandviwalla was born on 25 January 1959 in Karachi, to a Dawoodi Bohra family. His parents had migrated from Mandvi, Gujarat after Partition Of India. He graduated from Fort Worth School of Aviation in Texas, USA in 1981 and authorized with a commercial Pilot's license from the United States of America.

Political offices
Preceded by Abdul Hafeez Shaikh	Minister of Finance; 2013	Succeeded by Mir Hazar Khan Khoso; Acting
Preceded by Abdul Ghafoor Haideri	Deputy Chairman of the Senate of Pakistan; 2018	Incumbent
