= Asmatullah =

Pakistani politician (died 2024)

Maulvi Asmatullah
- مولوی عصمت اللہ

Member of the National Assembly of Pakistan
- In office 13 August 2018 – 10 August 2023
- Constituency: NA-264 (Quetta-I)
- In office 2008–2013
- Constituency: NA-264 (Zhob-cum-Sherani-cum-Killa Saifullah)

Personal details
- Died: 4 June 2024 Killa Saifullah, Balochistan, Pakistan

Asmatullah (died 4 June 2024) was a Pakistani politician who was a member of the National Assembly of Pakistan from 2008 to 2013 and from 2018 to 2023.

== Life and career ==
Asmatullah was elected to the National Assembly of Pakistan from Constituency NA-264 (Zhob-cum-Sherani-cum-Killa Saifullah) as an independent candidate in the 2008 Pakistani general election. He received 24,204 votes and defeated Muhammad Khan Sherani.

Asmatullah contested the seat of the National Assembly from Constituency NA-264 (Zhob-cum-Sherani-cum-Killa Saifullah) as a candidate of Jamiat Ulama-e-Islam Nazryati in the 2013 Pakistani general election but was unsuccessful. He received 27,514 votes and lost the seat to Muhammad Khan Sherani.

Asmatullah was reelected to the National Assembly as a candidate of Muttahida Majlis-e-Amal from Constituency NA-264 (Quetta-I) in the 2018 Pakistani general election.

Asmatullah died on 4 June 2024.

== See also ==
- List of Deobandis
