= Mitha Khan Kakar =

Pakistani politician

Member of the Provincial Assembly of the Balochistan
- In office 13 August 2018 – 12 August 2023
- Constituency: PB-2 Zhob

Personal details
- Party: IPP (2025-present)
- Other political affiliations: PMLN (2023-2024); IND (2018)

Mitha Khan Kakar is a Pakistani politician who was the Provincial Minister of the Balochistan for Livestock and Dairy Development, in office from August 2018 to August 2023. He had been a member of Provincial Assembly of the Balochistan from August 2018 to August 2023.

== Political career ==
He was elected to the Provincial Assembly of the Balochistan as an independent candidate from Constituency PB-2 (Zhob) in the 2018 Pakistani general election. He is now Parliamentary Secretary Mines & Minerals Development.

On 27 August 2018, he was inducted into the provincial Balochistan cabinet of Chief Minister of Jam Kamal Khan with the status of a provincial minister. On 30 August 2018, he was appointed as advisor to Chief Minister on livestock and dairy development.
