= Adil Khan Bazai =

Chief Minister Of Khyber Pakhtunkhwa

- عادل خان بازئی

Member of the National Assembly of Pakistan
- Incumbent
- Assumed office 29 February 2024
- Preceded by: Malik Sikandar Khan
- Constituency: NA-262 Quetta-I

Personal details
- Party: PTI (2013–present)
- Occupation: Politician
- Known for: MNA NA-262 Quetta-I; Former Advisor to Chief Minister Balochistan

Adil Khan Bazai (Urdu: عادل خان بازئی), also known as Malak Adil Khan Bazai, is a Pakistani politician who has been a member of the National Assembly of Pakistan since February 2024, representing the constituency of NA-262 Quetta-I. Prior to his election to the National Assembly, he served as an Advisor to the Chief Minister of Balochistan.

== Early life and education ==
Adil Khan Bazai was born in Quetta, Balochistan. He belongs to the Bazai family, a notable family based in Mohalla Bazai Qila, Airport Road, Quetta. He received his education in Quetta.

== Political career ==
=== Advisor to Chief Minister Balochistan ===
Before entering national politics, Adil Khan Bazai served as an Advisor to the Chief Minister of Balochistan. He was active in Balochistan's political landscape for several years before contesting general elections.

=== 2024 General Election ===
In the 2024 Pakistani general election, Bazai contested from NA-262 Quetta-I as an independent candidate with the support of Pakistan Tehreek-e-Insaf (PTI). He won the seat with 20,278 votes, defeating the runner-up Malik Sikandar Khan of Jamiat Ulema-e-Islam (F), who received 12,887 votes.

=== Party affiliation controversy ===
After the election, Bazai claimed to have joined the Sunni Ittehad Council (SIC), in line with the practice of most other PTI-supported independent candidates. He posted a photograph of a signed affidavit confirming his membership of the SIC on X. However, the Election Commission of Pakistan (ECP) and the official records of the National Assembly stated that he had joined Pakistan Muslim League (N) (PML-N).

=== 26th Constitutional Amendment and disqualification ===
Like other SIC members, Bazai did not vote in favour of the 26th Amendment to the Constitution of Pakistan. As a result, Nawaz Sharif, the president of PML-N, filed a reference with Ayaz Sadiq, the Speaker of the National Assembly, seeking Bazai's disqualification on grounds of floor-crossing. On 21 October 2024, Sadiq wrote to the ECP requesting Bazai's disqualification. On 21 November 2024, the ECP officially disqualified Bazai and declared his seat vacant.

=== Supreme Court reinstatement ===
Bazai challenged the ECP's disqualification order in the Supreme Court of Pakistan. On 9 December 2024, the Supreme Court suspended the ECP's order and provisionally reinstated his membership. In its final ruling on 12 December 2024, the Supreme Court overturned the ECP's disqualification decision and restored Bazai's National Assembly membership as an independent candidate, rather than as a member of PML-N. Subsequently, the ECP issued a formal notification reinstating Bazai as the independent returned candidate from NA-262 Quetta-I.

== Electoral history ==
Election	Constituency	Party	Votes	Result
2024	NA-262 Quetta-I	PTI	20,278	Won

== Sources ==
- Bazai, Adil (23 February 2024). "Tweet announcing joining of Sunni Ittehad Council". X.
- "NA-262 - Quetta 1". Dunya News. 10 February 2024. Archived from the original on 4 March 2024.
- "NA-262 Quetta 1". Geo News. 10 February 2024. Archived from the original on 13 February 2024.
- "Profile: Mr. Adil Khan Bazai". National Assembly of Pakistan.
- "Govt takes action against MNA Adil Bazai for skipping vote on 26th amendment". Dunya News. 21 November 2024.
- Ijaz, Raja Mohsin (21 November 2024). "ECP disqualifies Adil Bazai over floor crossing". ARY News.
- "SC suspends ECP's decision to disqualify MNA Adil Bazai". ARY News. 9 December 2024.
- Mehtab, Umer (12 December 2024). "Supreme Court strikes down ECP verdict, restores Adil Bazai as MNA". Dawn.
- "Bazai reinstated as MNA". Business Recorder. 31 December 2024.

Parliament of Pakistan
Preceded by Seat established	Member of the National Assembly of Pakistan for NA-262 Quetta-I; 2024–present	Incumbent

== Political career ==
Bazai was elected to the National Assembly of Pakistan in the 2024 Pakistani general election from NA-262 Quetta-I as an independent candidate supported by Pakistan Tehreek-e-Insaf (PTI). He received 20,278 votes while runners up Malik Sikandar Khan of Jamiat Ulema-e-Islam (F) received 12,887 votes.

After the election, he claimed to have joined the Sunni Ittehad Council (SIC) as most PTI-supported independents. To this end, he posted a photo of a signed affidavit of his joining on X. However, the Election Commission of Pakistan (ECP) and the records of the National Assembly both stated that he had joined the Pakistan Muslim League (N) (PML-N).

Just as other SIC members, he did not vote for the 26th Amendment to the Constitution of Pakistan. As a result, Nawaz Sharif, the president of the PML-N, sent a reference to Ayaz Sadiq, the Speaker, for Bazai's disqualification and de-seating. On 21 October 2024, Sadiq sent a letter to the ECP seeking Bazai's disqualification. On 21 November 2024, the ECP officially disqualified Bazai and declared his seat vacant.

However, on 9 December 2024, during Bazai's appeal, the Supreme Court suspended the ECP's order and re-instated his membership. In its final decision on 12 December, the Supreme Court overturned the ECP's decision, and restored his membership as an independent rather than as a part of PML(N).
