= Khushal Khan Kakar =

Member of the National Assembly of Pakistan from Balochistan (2024–2029)

- خوشحال خان کاکڑ

Member of the National Assembly of Pakistan
- Incumbent
- Assumed office 27 February 2026
- Constituency: NA-251 Sherani-cum-Zhob-cum-Killa Saifullah

Personal details
- Party: PKNAP (2022-present)
- Parent: Usman Kakar (father)

Minister National Assembly

Khushal Khan Kakar (Urdu: خوشحال خان کاکڑ) is a Pakistani politician who is the chairman of the PNAP.He was elected as a Member of the National Assembly from NA-251 Sherani-cum-Zhob-cum-Kalla Saifullah in 2026. After initially losing the election, Khushal Khan Kakar filed a petition challenging the result of the NA-251 constituency. The Supreme Court of Pakistan subsequently declared him the returned candidate and directed the Election Commission of Pakistan to issue his formal notification of success in February 2026.

== Political career ==
Kakar established the Pashtunkhwa National Awami Party (PKNAP) on 27 December 2022, founding it as a distinct faction of the Pashtunkhwa Milli Awami Party (PKMAP).

He contested the 2024 Pakistani general election from NA-251 Sherani-cum-Zhob-cum-Killa Saifullah, NA-262 Quetta-I and NA-265 Pishin as a PKNAP candidate. He received 46,117 votes, 8,810 votes, and 31,436 votes, being defeated by Syed Samiullah of Jamiat Ulema-e-Islam (F) (JUI(F)), Adil Khan Bazai, a Pakistan Tehreek-e-Insaf (PTI) affiliated independent, and Fazal-ur-Rehman, the leader of the JUI(F), respectively. Kakar contested the 2024 Pakistani general election from NA-251 Sherani-cum-Zhob-cum-Killa Saifullah, losing to Syed Samiullah. After his defeat, he filed a petition challenging the election results. The Supreme Court of Pakistan declared him the returned candidate and directed the Election Commission of Pakistan to issue his official notification in February 2026.
