= Nawaz Kibzai =

Member of the Provincial Assembly of Balochistan (2024–2029)

- نواز کِبزئی

Member of the Provincial Assembly of Balochistan
- Incumbent
- Assumed office 29 February 2024
- Constituency: PB-1 Sherani-cum-Zhob

Personal details
- Party: JUI (F) (2024-present)

Muhammad Nawaz Khan Kibzai (Urdu: محمد نواز خان کِبزئی) is a Pakistani politician who is member of the Provincial Assembly of Balochistan.

== Political career ==
Kibzai won the 2024 Balochistan provincial election from PB-1 Sherani-cum-Zhob as a Jamiat Ulema-e-Islam (F) candidate. He received 14,183 votes while runner up Independent candidate Shah Zaman Kakar received 8,562 votes.
