= Usman Kakar =

Pakistani politician (1961–2021)

Senator Usman Kakar
- عثمان کاکړ

Member of the Senate of Pakistan
- In office 13 March 2015 – March 2021

Personal details
- Born: 23 June 1961 Hindu Bagh (now known as Muslim Bagh), Killa Saifullah, Balochistan, Pakistan
- Died: 21 June 2021 (aged 59) Karachi, Pakistan
- Cause of death: Mysterious Head injury
- Resting place: Muslim Bagh, Killa Saifullah, Balochistan, Pakistan
- Party: Pashtunkhwa Milli Awami Party
- Children: Khushal Kakar (son); Dawran Kakar (son); Batura Kakar (daughter)
- Parent: Sardar Abdul Qayyum Khan Kakar (father)
- Education: University of Balochistan

Muhammad Usman Khan Kakar (Pashto: عثمان کاکړ; also known as Usman Lala (عثمان لالا), was a Pashtun politician affiliated with the Pashtunkhwa Milli Awami Party (PMAP) and a Pashtun Tahafuz Movement activist. He was a member of the Senate of Pakistan from 2015 to 2021.

Kakar died on 21 June 2021 in Karachi from a head injury he had mysteriously sustained four days earlier at his home in Quetta. His family, as well as several politicians and activists, claimed that he was murdered and demanded an inquiry. According to his postmortem report, which detected no marks of violence on any part of his body, the cause of his death would emerge in the chemical and histopathology report for which samples had been collected. On 1 July, the Government of Balochistan formed a judicial commission to investigate his death, but it was abolished without any result after a month. On 14 March 2022, the Pashtun National Jirga in Bannu demanded that Kakar's death be investigated by a credible judicial commission headed by Justice Qazi Faez Isa, and the report be made public.

== Early life and education ==
Usman was born in 1961 in Hindu Bagh (now known as Muslim Bagh), Killa Saifullah District, and belonged to the Kakar Pashtun tribe. His father, Sardar Abdul Qayyum Khan Kakar, was a tribal elder.

Usman Kakar received his primary education at a local school in Hindu Bagh (now known as Muslim Bagh). After matriculating from Islamia School in Quetta, he obtained a diploma in engineering from Bahawalpur. After completing his BSc from Science College, he obtained his MA in Economics from the University of Balochistan. He received the degree of Bachelor of Laws from Law College Quetta in 1987.

== Political beginnings ==
Kakar became politically active in 1977 and joined the Pashtun Students Organisation of the Pashtunkhwa National Awami Party (PNAP). In 1983, the Pashtun Students Organisation merged with the Frontier Students Federation, a student wing of the Mazdoor Kisan Party (MKP), resulting in the formation of a new student organization that was named the Pashtunkhwa Students Organization (PSO). Kakar was elected the first secretary of the Pashtunkhwa Students Organization during its maiden conference in 1987 in Peshawar.

Kakar was also a member of the central council of the Pashtunkhwa National People’s Alliance, which was formed in 1986 when the PNAP (of Mahmood Khan Achakzai) and the Pakhtunkhwa Mazdoor Kisan Party (PMKP, of Sher Ali Bacha) reached an agreement. As a result of this alliance, the Pashtunkhwa Milli Awami Party (PMAP) was created in March 1989 at a meeting in Quetta, and Kakar was elected as the senior secretary of PMAP. In 2007, he was elected as PMAP's provincial president. He was also elected as the central secretary during the party's fourth congress in 2013, in addition to his role as the provincial president.

Kakar played an active role not only at the level of his party, but also in other political movements, including the Pakistan Oppressed Nations Movement (PONM) and the Movement for the Restoration of Democracy (MRD), the latter of which was formed in the 1980s to end the military regime of General Zia-ul-Haq. Kakar was an activist in the Pashtun Tahafuz Movement (PTM) since its emergence in 2018 and participated in its protests and gatherings.

== Political career ==
Kakar was elected to the Senate of Pakistan as a candidate of PMAP in the 2015 Pakistani Senate election.

He ran for the post of the Deputy Chairman of the Senate of Pakistan as a candidate of PMAP in March 2018. He was unsuccessful and lost the office to a candidate of the Pakistan Peoples Party, Saleem Mandviwalla, who got 54 votes and who was supported by the joint opposition. Kakar received 44 votes and was supported by the Pakistan Muslim League (N), the ruling party.

In his last Senate speech, the video of which went viral after he lost consciousness due to head injury, Kakar spoke about the threats he had been getting, but the government ignored the warnings regarding the dangers to his life. In his speech, Kakar said, "I would like to say something personal that I have not said in six years. We are being pressured to abandon democracy and our ideology, to stop talking about the multiple nations, to stop talking about the supremacy of parliament, and to stop criticising the undemocratic forces, but I cannot do this. I do not care if something happens to me, my children, or my family, because I cherish my ideology, democracy, my nation, and the supremacy of parliament. However, I want to put it on record that if something happens to me or my family, it will be the responsibility of the two intelligence agencies [ISI and MI]."

== Death ==
On 17 June 2021, Kakar was found lying unconscious on a carpet at his home in Quetta's Shahbaz Town, with blood flowing from his head. His close relative and PMAP provincial deputy secretary, Muhammad Yusuf Khan Kakar, told the BBC that Usman Kakar was healthy, and had returned home from PMAP office on Quetta's Jinnah Road at 3pm the same day. He had travelled with his bodyguard, who returned to the party office after reaching Usman Kakar's home. Yusuf added that when Usman Kakar was at home, there was no one in his house except his 11-year-old daughter and a woman. Usman Kakar and his daughter were in the lower part of the house while the woman was on the upper floor, but his daughter was not with him when Usman Kakar went to rest in a room, after which he sustained the head injury and lost consciousness.

Within 30 minutes, Kakar was shifted to a private hospital in Quetta where he underwent emergency head surgery and was put on a ventilator. When a part of his head was shaved for the operation, his head was found to be swollen and injured. The CT scan showed that there was a blood clot in his head and his condition was gradually deteriorating. He did not regain consciousness, and was later shifted on an air ambulance to the Aga Khan University Hospital in Karachi by the Government of Sindh on the instructions of Pakistan Peoples Party chairman Bilawal Bhutto Zardari, where he died on 21 June because of accumulation of blood in his brain due to the head injury.

Kakar's family and some politicians claimed that there might be foul play behind Kakar's death. Muhammad Yusuf Khan Kakar, as well as Usman Kakar's son Khushal Kakar, claimed that he was attacked by people who entered the house from outside when he was alone in the room. "It seemed that he was grabbed by one person and hit on the head," Khushal Kakar added.

=== Funeral prayers ===
Islamic funeral prayers were performed for Kakar first at Bagh-e-Jinnah, Karachi on 21 June, and then in his hometown, Muslim Bagh, on 23 June, after which he was buried in the cemetery that was named after him as he had donated the land for it. His funerals were attended by tens of thousands of mourners, including leaders and activists of various political parties. His funeral in Muslim Bagh, which was led by Maulana Atta Ur Rehman (brother of Maulana Fazal-ur-Rehman), was the biggest in the history of the Pashtun-populated areas of Balochistan. However, Pakistani authorities prevented an Afghan government delegation, which included Mohibullah Samim and Sarwar Ahmedzai, from traveling to Muslim Bagh to attend Kakar's funeral.

As his dead body was being transported from Karachi to Quetta and Muslim Bagh, a large number of Baloch and Pashtun people, including political workers, came out to pay their respects and showered flower petals on his vehicle at various places along the road.

Mahmood Khan Achakzai, chairman of the Pashtunkhwa Milli Awami Party, said in his speech at the funeral in Muslim Bagh that he had strong evidence that Kakar was murdered. Achakzai announced that he would convene the Pashtun National Jirga in Bannu within three months to discuss the major problems affecting Pashtuns, such as insecurity and power over their resources, and to find solutions; the jirga was later held from 11 to 14 March 2022.

Absentee funeral prayers were performed for Kakar in many cities and towns of Afghanistan, Pakistan, and other countries, including Quetta, Peshawar, Mingora (Swat), Kabul, Jalalabad, Islamabad, Khushab, Faisalabad, and at several universities in Punjab. In Kandahar, a funeral prayer and a fatiha ceremony was held for him at Kirka Sharif (Shrine of the Cloak).

=== Responsibility ===
Members of the Pashtunkhwa Milli Awami Party, including Khushal Kakar, the son of Usman Kakar, called the death an "assassination" and blamed the Inter-Services Intelligence (ISI) and the Military Intelligence (MI), the two intelligence agencies of Pakistan, for the alleged murder.

Ehsanullah Ehsan, a former spokesman for the Pakistani Taliban (Tehreek-e-Taliban Pakistan, or TTP), responded to a journalist's Facebook post by saying that Usman Kakar had not died a natural death, but had been killed, and that Ehsanullah Ehsan was given a hit list in the past that included the name of Usman Kakar. He added the list also included the names of Pashtun Tahafuz Movement (PTM) leader Said Alam and politician Afrasiab Khattak. Ehsanullah Ehsan's allegations deeply worried many Pashtun nationalist politicians and activists, who called on the government to conduct a full investigation into the cause of Kakar's death. "Some local and foreign journalists confirmed that the Facebook account belongs to Ehsanullah Ehsan, a former spokesman for the Pakistani Taliban and Jamaat-ul-Ahrar," Said Alam told Deutsche Welle.

On the other hand, the ruling political party, Pakistan Tehreek-e-Insaf (PTI), said it was "regrettable and shameful" that the Pashtun nationalists took the remarks of a former Taliban spokesman seriously and did not trust Pakistani institutions. Mohammed Iqbal Khan Afridi, a PTI leader and member of the National Assembly, said "the death of Usman Kakar seems natural," and that "those who make false accusations against the Pakistani military should be severely punished."

=== Investigation ===
The postmortem report said there were no marks of violence on any part of his body and that he died due to brain hemorrhage. However, the report did not conclusively provide a cause of death, and said the cause of death would emerge in the chemical and histopathology report for which samples had been collected.

Dr Summaiya Syed, additional police surgeon at the Jinnah Postgraduate Medical Centre in Karachi, said, "the alleged head injury could not be commented upon because of the surgical procedures carried out during life. However, CT scans, both antemortem and postmortem, are available while hospital records and reports for chemical analysis and histopathology are awaited."

On 1 July, the Government of Balochistan formed a judicial commission to investigate his death, but it was abolished without any result after a month.

=== Reactions ===
Afghan President Ashraf Ghani expressed his sorrow over the death of Kakar. According to a statement from the Arg presidential palace of Afghanistan: "Usman Khan Kakar was an astute politician of the Afghan homeland who wanted peace. He was a staunch supporter of the Afghan peace process and a staunch opponent of foreign intervention in Afghanistan. Usman Khan Kakar was the voice of his oppressed and downtrodden people against all forms of violence, oppression, and tyranny, and his death is a great shock to the Afghan homeland and people. On behalf of the Afghan government and people, we share the grief of the Pashtunkhwa Milli Awami Party and his family."

Former Afghan President Hamid Karzai, Foreign Minister Haneef Atmar, National Security Adviser Hamdullah Mohib, and Border and Tribal Affairs Minister Mohibullah Samim also called Kakar's death a great loss, hailing him as the voice of Afghans, especially Pashtuns. Hamdullah Mohib said, "although Usman Kakar's void will not be filled, the path of his aspirations and hopes will never be empty."

Members of the Pashtunkhwa Milli Awami Party, including Khushal Kakar, the son of Usman Kakar, called the death a murder and blamed the intelligence agencies of Pakistan. Khushal Kakar added that he was told by the doctors that Usman Kakar had a severe head injury and it could not be due to falling down. Mahmood Khan Achakzai, chairman of the PMAP, said, "if anyone can do justice, we can tell them how Usman Khan Kakar received threats and how people entered his house and attacked him." On the other hand, Balochistan Home Minister Mir Ziaullah Langau told the PMAP and Usman Kakar's family that the government was ready to cooperate with them in the investigation.

Maryam Nawaz, Vice President of the Pakistan Muslim League (N), praised Kakar as "a strong voice of democracy and a front line soldier of the struggle for civilian supremacy." She added that the "memory of his struggle would be kept alive." Saleem Mandviwalla of the Pakistan Peoples Party, the deputy chairman of the Senate of Pakistan, said "doctors were also skeptical about how such profuse bleeding in the head could be caused by a mere fall." Shahadat Awan of the Pakistan Peoples Party and Muhammad Akram of the National Party raised their doubts that there might be foul play behind the "sudden death."

Senators Maulana Atta-ur-Rehman and Kamran Murtaza of the Jamiat Ulema-e-Islam (F) also said that the nature of the death raised questions. "[Kakar] had received several threats in the past, and now his death is shrouded in mystery," Atta-ur-Rehman said. Hidayat Ullah Khan of the Awami National Party and Manzoor Pashteen and Mohsin Dawar of the Pashtun Tahafuz Movement also voiced their concerns and demanded for a complete investigation. According to Mohsin Dawar, the head injury was "too severe to result from a fall."

== See also ==
- List of massacres of Pakistani civilians by Pakistani troops
- List of extrajudicial killings in Pakistan
