= Maulana Noorullah =

Pakistani politician

Member of the Provincial Assembly of the Balochistan
- Incumbent
- Assumed office 29 February 2024
- In office 13 August 2018 – 12 August 2023
- Constituency: PB-3 Killa Saifullah

Personal details
- Party: PPP (2023-present)
- Other political affiliations: JUI (F) (2018-2022)

Maulana Noorullah is a Pakistani politician Pakistani politician and ethnic Pashtun tribesman. He is currently serving as a member of the Provincial Assembly of Balochistan since February 2024.

He has also been a member of the Provincial Assembly of the Balochistan from August 2018 to August 2023.
