= Pashtunkhwa National Awami Party =

Pashtunkhwa National Awami Party پشتونخوا نیشنل عوامی پارٹی Pakhtunkhwa National People's Party
- Pashto name: پښتونخوا نېشنل عوامي پارټي
- Abbreviation: PKNAP
- Chairman: Khushal Khan Kakar
- Founder: Khushal Khan Kakar
- Founded: 27 December 2022; 3 years ago
- Registered: 1 January 2024; 2 years ago
- Split from: PkMAP
- Headquarters: Quetta, Balochistan, Pakistan
- Ideology: Pashtun nationalism; Egalitarianism
- National affiliation: TTAP
- Colours: Crimson & White

Election symbol
- Grapes

Party flag
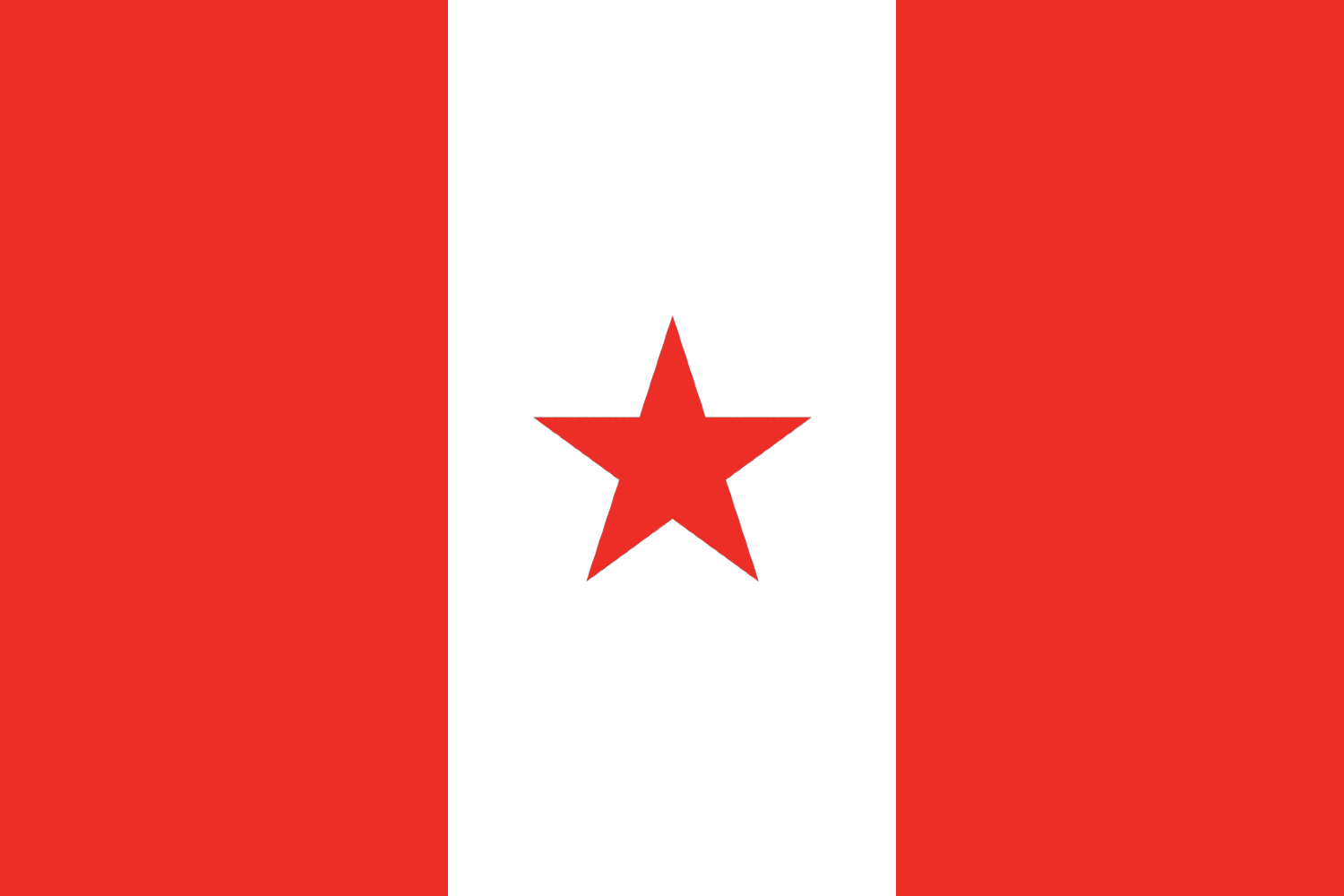

Website
- Official website

Pashtunkhwa National Awami Party (Pashto: پښتونخوا نېشنل عوامي پارټي; Urdu: پشتونخوا نیشنل عوامی پارٹی; English: Pakhtunkhwa National People's Party; abbreviated as PKNAP), is a political party based in Balochistan, Pakistan. It was founded as a breakaway faction of Pashtunkhwa Milli Awami Party (PKMAP) by Khushal Kakar, son of former PKMAP leader Usman Kakar after having differences with PKMAP leader Mahmood Khan Achakzai in December 2022.
