= Killa Saifullah District =

Coordinates: 31°00′36″N 68°20′24″E

Killa Saifullah ضلع قلعہ سیف اللہ سيف الله کلا ولسوالۍ قلعه سيف الله دمگ
- District of Balochistan
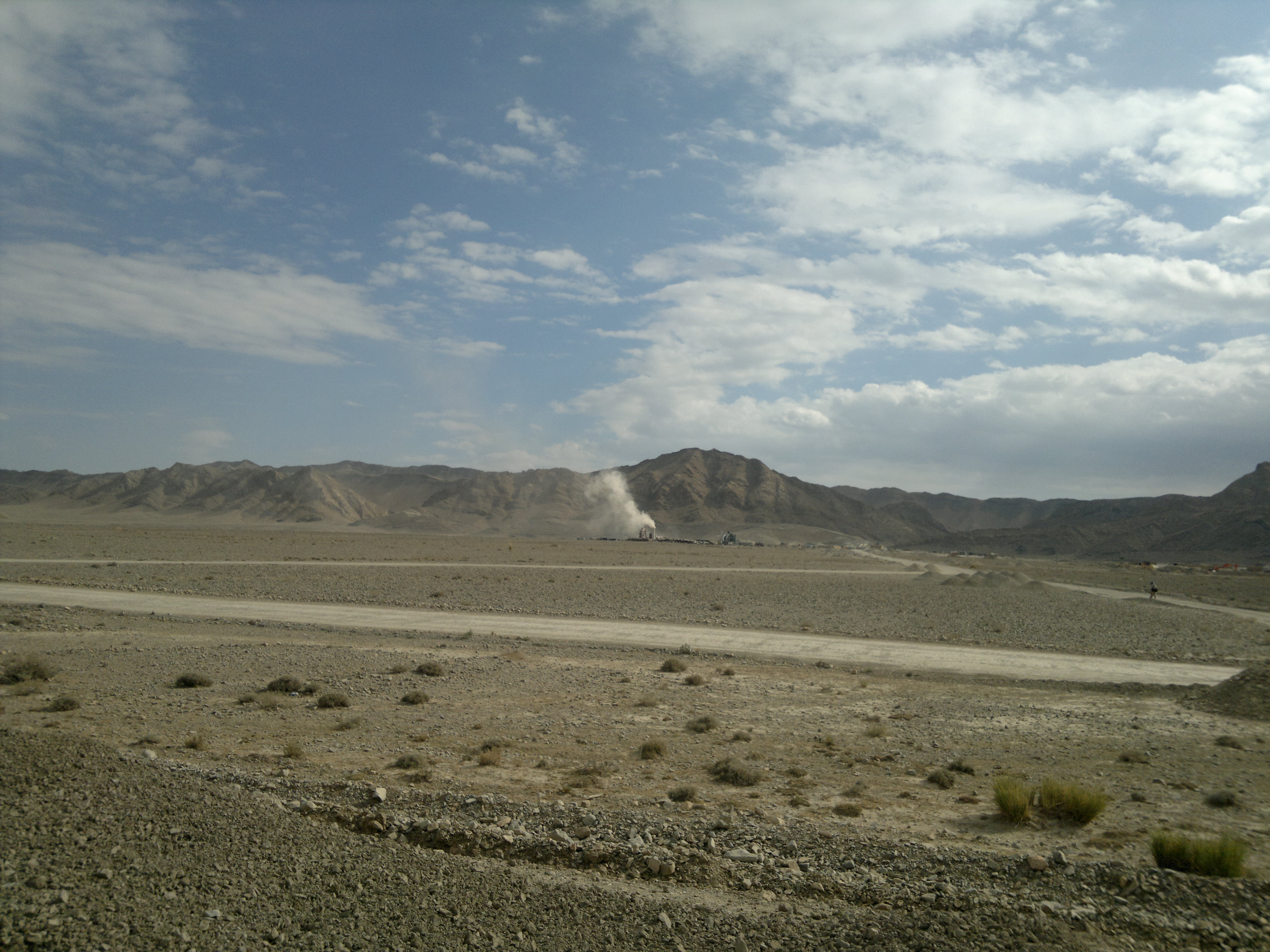
- View on Zhob-Quetta road near Killa Saifullah

- Country: Pakistan
- Province: Balochistan
- Division: Zhob

Government
  - Type: District Administration
  - Deputy Commissioner: N/A
  - District Police Officer: N/A
  - District Health Officer: N/A

Area
  - Total: 6,831 km^{2} (2,637 sq mi)

Population (2023)
  - Total: 380,200
  - Density: 55.7/km^{2} (144/sq mi)
  - Urban: 64,175 (18.87%)
  - Rural: 316,025 (81.13%)

Literacy
  - Literacy rate: Total: (32.96%); Male: (43.93%); Female: (21.24%)
- Time zone: UTC+5 (PST)

Kila Saifullah District, Qilla Saifullah, or Saifullah Killa (Urdu and Balochi: قلعہ سیف اللہ, Pashto: قلعه سیف الله) is a district in northwestern Balochistan province, Pakistan. It was established as a district in 1988, comprising two former administrative units of Zhob District: the Upper Zhob sub division and the sub tehsil of Badinai, previously named Kashatoo and part of the sub-district of Kakar Khurasan.

== History ==
Qilla Saifullah is a fort (qilla) built by Saifullah Khan, belonging to Mirdadzai Khoidadadza tribe of Kakars. Qilla Saifullah District derives its name from this fort. Early in the 13th century, the area came within the sphere of the raids of the Mongol hordes of Genghis Khan. In 1398 CE, an expedition against the Afghans of the area was led by Pir Muhammad, grandson of Amir Timur aka Tamerlane. Although no verifiable information exists about any foreign occupation, many forts, mounds and karezes are attributed to the Mughals.

Both Nadir Shah (reigned 1736–47) and Ahmed Shah (reigned 1747–73) extended their power through Balochistan and thenceforth Zhob remained more or less under the nominal suzerainty of the Durranis and Barakzais until it came under British protection. In the middle of the 18th century, Ahmed Shah granted a sanad (certificate) to Bekar Nika, fourth in descent from Jogi and the head of the Jogezai family, conferring upon him the title and position of "Badshah of Zhob". Shah Jehan Jogezai was conferred as Badshah (ruler) of Zhob. Jogezai's descendants used to live in Loralai District of Balochistan.

The British sent its Zhob Expedition in 1884 in order to occupy the Zhob region through Baratkhail. Meanwhile, the castles of Saifullah Khan Khoidadzai and Shah Jehan Jogezai (Badshah of Zhob) were demolished. On 7 October 1884, an assault on the Qalla (castle) of Shah Jahan near Akhterzai resulted the killings of many tribal people including Malik Hamza Daulatzai and Mohammad Ghous who fought bravely. All 500 tribal Sardars admitted their submission before the British forces and also signed an agreement that they will not interfere in the affairs of British Government in Zhob region except Saifullah Khan Khoidadzai and Shah Jehan Jogezai who had a narrow escape from the battle scene and established themselves at Kalat; where they used to operate their insurgency campaign against the British and never subdued before the British occupying forces.

== Demographics ==
Historical population
Year	Pop.	±% p.a.
1961	37,577	—
1972	72,086	+6.10%
1981	148,362	+8.35%
1998	193,553	+1.58%
2017	342,932	+3.06%
2023	380,200	+1.73%

As of the 2023 census, Killa Saifullah district has 69,998 households and a population of 380,200. The district has a sex ratio of 109.91 males to 100 females and a literacy rate of 32.96%: 43.93% for males and 21.24% for females. 153,619 (40.40% of the surveyed population) are under 10 years of age. 64,175 (16.88%) live in urban areas. 1,007 (0.26% of the surveyed population) are religious minorities, mainly Christians. Pashto is the predominant language, spoken by estimated 99.52% of the population.

== Administration ==
The district is administratively subdivided into the following tehsils:

Tehsil	Area (km²)	Pop. (2023)	Density (ppl/km²) (2023)	Literacy rate (2023)	Union Councils
Killa Saifullah Tehsil	1,103	152,516	138.27	30.77%	...
Loiband Tehsil	972	29,693	30.55	25.81%	...
Muslim Bagh Tehsil	943	83,795	88.86	45.36%	...
Badini	985	20,640	20.95	19.15%	...
Kan metharzai Tehsil	383	34,298	89.55	53.65%	...
Shinki Tehsil	2,445	59,258	24.24	14.93%	...

At present the district is divided into two sub-divisions: Qilla Saifullah and Muslim Bagh. Kila Saifullah sub-division comprises one tehsil (Killa Saifullah) and one sub-tehsil (Badinai). Killa Saifullah tehsil is further sub divided into two Qanungo circles and then into five patwar circles. The entire Badinai sub-tehsil is a Qanungo circle as well as patwar circle. Muslim Bagh sub-division comprises Muslim Bagh tehsil and Loiband sub-tehsil. The entire Muslim Bagh tehsil is one Qanungo circle, further sub-divided into four patwar circles. The Loiband sub-tehsil consists of one qanungo circle and is sub-divided into two patwar circles.

=== Populated places ===
- Babu China
- Muslim Bagh
- Qilla Saifullah

== Education ==
According to the Pakistan District Education Rankings 2017, district Killa Saifullah is ranked at number 127 out of the 141 ranked districts in Pakistan on the education score index. This index considers learning, gender parity and retention in the district.

Literacy rate in 2014–15 of population 10 years and older in the district stands at 40% whereas for females it is only 6%.

Post primary access is a major issue in the district with 88% schools being at primary level. Compare this with high schools which constitute only 4% of government schools in the district. This is also reflected in the enrolment figures for 2016–17 with 15,836 students enrolled in class 1 to 5 and only 338 students enrolled in class 9 and 10.

Gender disparity and access to education for girls are major issues in the district and are reflected in the low literacy rates for females. Only 24% schools in the district are girls’ schools.

Moreover, the schools in the district lack basic facilities. According to Alif Ailaan district education rankings 2017, the district is ranked at number 140 out of the 155 districts of Pakistan for primary school infrastructure. At the middle school level, it is ranked at number 134 out of the 155 districts. These rankings take into account the basic facilities available in schools including drinking water, working toilet, availability of electricity, existence of a boundary wall and general building condition. Approximately 3 out of 4 schools do not have electricity in them. 2 out 3 schools lack a toilet and 1 out of 2 schools do not have a boundary wall. 2 out of 5 schools do not have clean drinking water.

The main issue for the district is the poor infrastructure of schools. They are reported to be in poor condition and need immediate repair.

== Oil and minerals ==
The district is rich with mineral wealth and produces high quality chromite in Pakistan, the second largest reserve in the world. Gypsum, ores of coal, salt, granite, marble, copper and gabbro are also found in various parts of the district. Being rich in oil and gas, the government of Pakistan has started oil and gas exploration in the Murgha Fairzai, Shaighala and Kakar Khurasan areas.

== Location ==
Killa Saifullah is about 182 km north-east of the provincial capital Quetta. Neighbouring districts are Zhob, Loralai and Pishin.

== Notable people ==
- Nawab Ayaz Jogezai
- Usman Khan Kakar
- Arman Loni
- Wranga Loni
- Maulana Abdul Wasay

== See also ==
- Tehsils in Pakistan
  - Tehsils of Balochistan
  - Tehsils of Punjab, Pakistan
  - Tehsils of Khyber Pakhtunkhwa
  - Tehsils of Sindh, Pakistan
  - Tehsils of Azad Kashmir
  - Tehsils of Gilgit-Baltistan
- Districts of Pakistan
  - Districts of Khyber Pakhtunkhwa
  - Districts of Punjab, Pakistan
  - Districts of Balochistan, Pakistan
  - Districts of Sindh, Pakistan
  - Districts of Azad Kashmir
  - Districts of Gilgit-Baltistan
- Divisions of Pakistan
  - Divisions of Balochistan
  - Divisions of Khyber Pakhtunkhwa
  - Divisions of Punjab, Pakistan
  - Divisions of Sindh
  - Divisions of Azad Kashmir
  - Divisions of Gilgit-Baltistan

== Bibliography ==
- 1998 District Census report of Killa Saifullah. Census publication. Vol. 115. Islamabad: Population Census Organization, Statistics Division, Government of Pakistan. 2000.
