= Bostan Junction railway station =

Railway station in Pakistan

Bostan Junction Station بوستان جنکشن ریلوے اسٹیشن
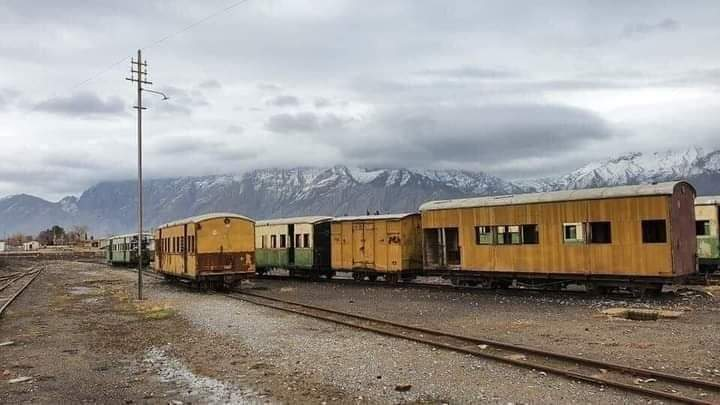

General information
- Location: Bostan, Pishin District, Balochistan; Pakistan
- Coordinates: 30.4311°N 67.0070°E
- Owner: Ministry of Railways
- Lines: Rohri-Chaman railway line Zhob Valley Railway

Other information
- Station code: BTN

History
- Opened: 1929

Services
Preceding station	Pakistan Railways	Following station
Kuchlak towards Rohri Junction	Rohri–Chaman Line	Yaru towards Chaman
Terminus	Zhob Valley Railway (defunct)	Khanai towards Zhob
Location

Bostan Junction Railway Station (Urdu: بوستان جنکشن ریلوے اسٹیشن) is a railway station located in Bostan, Pishin District of Balochistan province in Pakistan. It serves as the junction between the Rohri-Chaman Railway and Zhob Valley Railway.

At its peak, the station served as a major junction linking narrow-gauge and broad-gauge railway lines. It had large administrative offices, a station yard, and freight loading and unloading operations, where 500 to 1,000 railway staff regularly worked. As of 2025, six damaged railway carriages remain in the station yard, and the locomotive sheds are empty.

== See also ==
- List of railway stations in Pakistan
- Pakistan Railways
