= Jamiat Ulama-e-Islam Nazryati =

Jamiat Ulama-e-Islam Nazryati جمیعت علماءِ اسلام نظریاتی
- Abbreviation: JUI-N
- Leader: Asmatullah Khan
- Founder: Maulana Asmatullah Khan
- Founded: 2007; 19 years ago
- Dissolved: 25 February 2016; 10 years ago
- Split from: JUI (F)
- Merged into: JUI (F)
- Ideology: Islamism

Jamiat Ulama-e-Islam Nazryati (Urdu: جمیعت علماءِ اسلام نظریاتی) was an Islamist political party in Pakistan. It was formed by Maulana Asmatullah Khan after leaving Jamiat Ulema-e-Islam. It was formed as a breakaway faction of JUI(F) in 2007 and merged again with its parent organisation i.e. JUI-F in 2016. It participated in 2008 and 2013 Pakistani general election.

== Historical background ==
In 2007, before the 2008 Pakistani General Elections, some key leaders from Baluchistan led by Maulana Asmatullah formed JUI-Nazryati after they developed differences with Maulana Khan Muhammad Sherani, the then provincial chief of JUI(F) over party policies and distribution of tickets. The party was thereafter registered with ECP. later, JUI-Nazryati in alliance with Ahl-e-Sunnat Wal-Jamaat under the umbrella Muttahida Dini Mahaz fielded candidates in GE-2008. In the 2008 General Election, Maulana Asmatullah, JUI-Nazryati Chief defeated Maulana Khan Muhammad Sherani, Provincial Chief JUI-F to win National Assembly seat NA-264 (Zhob-cum-Sherani-cum-Killa Saifullah) as an independent candidate. Though JUI-Nazryati succeeded to secure a few National Assembly and Provincial Assembly seats in 2008, it failed to secure any seat in 2013 General Elections.

=== Support for Taliban and Al-Qaeda ===
JUI-Nazryati leaders openly supported Afghan Taliban and Al-Qaeda. Hafiz Fazal Bareech and other hardcore party leaders had organised 'Martyred Mullah Dadullah Conference' in June, 2007 wherein Mullah Dadullah Mansoor, who succeeded his brother Mullah Dadullah as Taliban's military commander also addressed the crowd via a tape recording.

In 2011, after the killing of Osama Bin Laden in Operation Neptune Spear, JUI-Nazryati organised protest rallies and funeral-prayer events in Quetta and other Pashtun districts of Baluchistan.

=== Merger with JUI-F ===
Having suffered badly in 2013 General Elections, the leaders of JUI-Nazryati had negotiations with JUI-F leadership to reunite. In early 2016, Moulana Asmatullah submitted an application to ECP for cancelling the JUI-N's registration as a political party. Later, Maulana Fazal-ur-Rehman announced a merger of the two factions in a public gathering in Quetta on 25 February 2016. Meanwhile, Maulana Abdul Qadir Luni and Molana Khalil Ahmed Mukhlis from swabi and some others opposed the merger claiming to "remain intact" and continue to oppose JUI-F policies.

== See also ==
- List of Deobandi organisations
- Jamiat Ulama-e-Islam
