= Zhob railway station =

Railway station in Pakistan

Zhob Railway Station ژوب ریلوے اسٹیشن

General information
- Location: Zhob, Balochistan; Pakistan
- Coordinates: 30.68712°N 68.63107°E
- Owner: Ministry of Railways
- Line: Zhob Valley Railway

Other information
- Station code: ZHOB

Services
Preceding station	Pakistan Railways	Following station
Badinzai towards Bostan Junction	Zhob Valley Railway (defunct)	Terminus
Location

Zhob Railway Station (Urdu: ژوب ریلوے اسٹیشن), formerly Sandeman Fort railway station, is located in Zhob, Balochistan, Pakistan.

== See also ==
- List of railway stations in Pakistan
- Pakistan Railways
