= 2024 Pakistani by-elections =

By-Elections in Pakistan (April 2024)

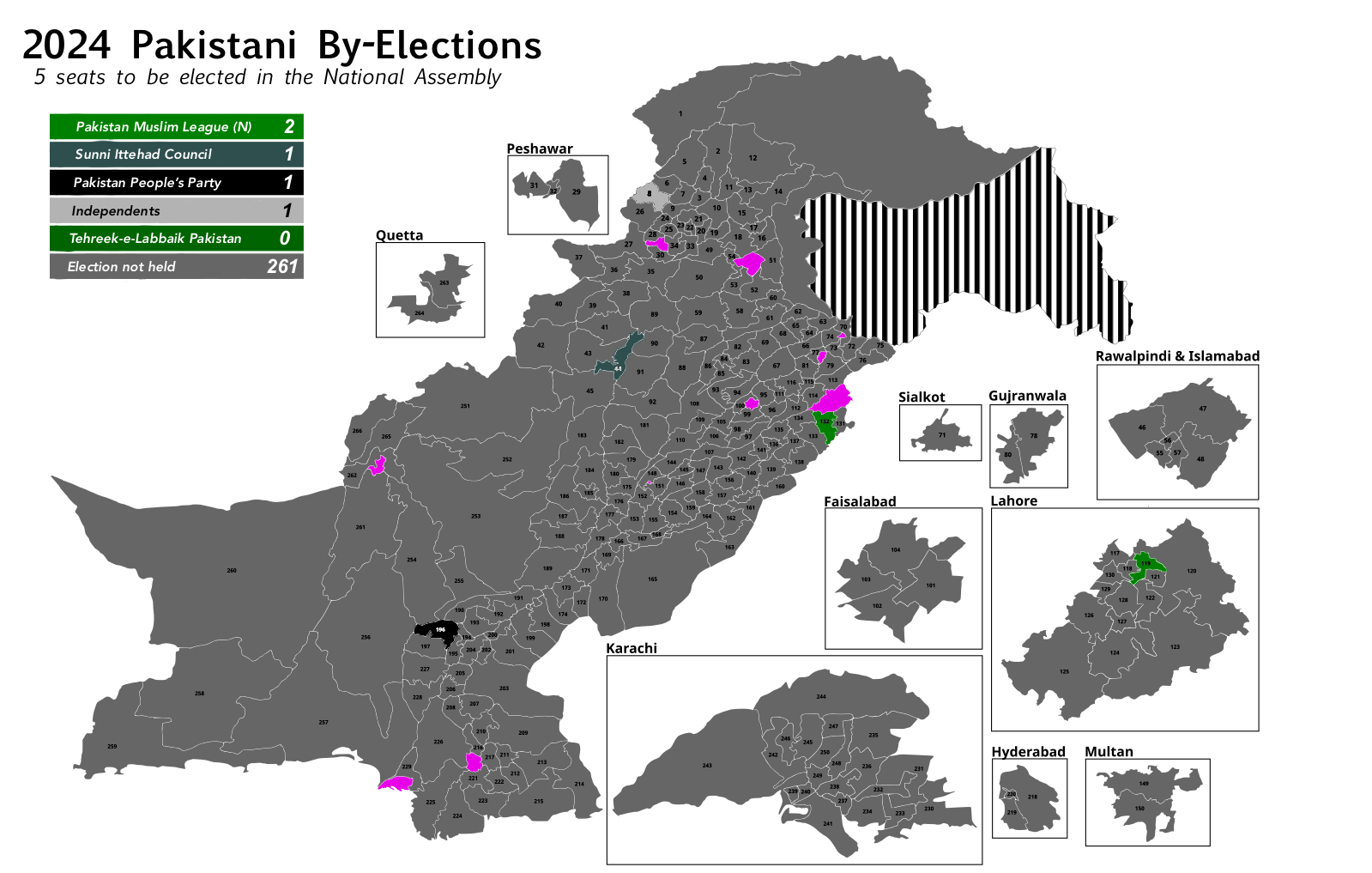
The results of the by-elections in the National Assembly.

The 2024 Pakistani by-elections were held on 21 April 2024 to fill 21 vacant seats in National and Provincial Assemblies. The elections were characterized by extensive security measures, including the deployment of Pakistan Army and Civil Armed Forces.

== Background ==
The by-elections were scheduled after the 2024 Pakistani general election. These seats fell vacant due to various reasons such as candidates winning multiple seats or delay in polling due to the death of a candidate. By-elections were held on 5 seats of National Assembly, 12 seats of Punjab Assembly, two seats of Khyber Pakhtunkhwa Assembly and two seats of Balochistan Assembly.

== Security measures ==
The federal government approved the deployment of Pakistan Army and Civil Armed Forces personnel during the by-elections. These forces functioned as a quick response force, deployed as a second and third tier behind the police. The exact number of troops and their deployment areas were determined by the ECP in consultation with all relevant stakeholders.

About 13,800 police personnel were deployed to guard 921 polling stations. The ECP mandates security personnel, excluding the armed forces deployed in by-elections, to maintain impartiality, assist officers, ensure peace, avoid clashes, arrests or interference, report irregularities and, in particular, conduct counting. Instructed to maintain neutrality during the process.

== Communication suspension ==
The Pakistan Telecommunication Authority (PTA) has announced that cellular service will be temporarily suspended in certain districts of Punjab and Balochistan on April 21 and 22 during the by-elections. The move was directed by the Ministry of Interior and aimed at ensuring the integrity and security of the electoral process.

== Candidates ==
National Assembly
No	District	Constituency	Candidates	Registered Voters			Polling Stations
No	District	Constituency	Candidates	Male	Female	Total	Polling Stations
1	Bajaur	NA-8	7	368,531	304,060	673,591	366
2	D.I Khan	NA-44	19	210,992	185,621	396,613	358
3	Lahore	NA-119	9	281,586	248,581	530,167	338
4	Kasur	NA-132	10	295,702	236,885	532,587	342
5	Qambar Shandadkot	NA-196	4	230,580	193,201	423,781	303
Total			49	1,387,431	1,168,356	2,556,787	1,707

Punjab
No	District	Constituency	Candidates	Registered Voters			Polling Stations
No	District	Constituency	Candidates	Male	Female	Total	Polling Stations
1	Chakwal	PP-22	9	146,798	143,324	290,122	215
2	Gujrat	PP-32	13	135,650	119,253	254,903	168
2	Wazirabad	PP-36	13	171,833	146,711	318,544	185
4	Narowal	PP-54	14	132,304	110,533	242,857	155
5	Bhakkar	PP-93	6	115,028	101,929	216,957	155
6	Sheikhpura	PP-139	6	103,424	85,781	189,205	123
7	Lahore	PP-147	11	201,680	173,167	374,847	232
8	Lahore	PP-149	14	180,879	164,569	345,448	218
9	Lahore	PP-158	21	102,818	82,798	185,616	116
10	Lahore	PP-164	19	80,338	63,057	143,395	99
11	R.Y Khan	PP-266	20	122,772	101,331	224,103	138
12	D.G Khan	PP-290	7	105,454	88,506	193,960	117
Total			153	1,598,978	1,380,959	2,979,957	1,921

Khyber Pakhtunkhwa
No	District	Constituency	Candidates	Registered Voters			Polling Stations
No	District	Constituency	Candidates	Male	Female	Total	Polling Stations
1	Bajaur	PK-22	13	96,978	78,859	175,837	91
2	Kohat	PK-91	10	121,570	102,807	224,377	168
Total			23	218,548	181,666	400,214	259

Balochistan
No	District	Constituency	Candidates	Registered Voters			Polling Stations
No	District	Constituency	Candidates	Male	Female	Total	Polling Stations
1	Khuzdar	PB-20	8	53,383	41,068	94,451	100
2	Lasbela	PB-22	4	76,328	62,740	139,068	129
3	Kila Abdullah	PB-50	23	104,161	59,592	163,753	125
Total			35	233,872	163,400	397,272	354

== Results ==
=== National Assembly ===
National Assembly
Party	Votes			Seats		
Party	No.	%	+/-	Contested	Won	+/-
PMLN	215,755	30.21		4	2	Steady
PTI	239,338	33.50		4	1	Steady
PPP	117,620	16.46		3	1	Steady
JI	18,416	2.58		1	0	Steady
TLP	9,800	1.37	0	1		Steady
STP	113,423	15.88	0	1		Steady
Total valid votes	714,352	98.35		49	5	
Rejected ballots	11,956	1.65				
Total votes polled	726,308	100				
Registered Voters	2,551,131	28.47				

=== Punjab Assembly ===
Party	Votes			Seats		
Party	No.	%	+/-	Contested	Won	+/-
PMLN	502,012	43.33		10	9	▲1
PTI	332,407	28.69		12	0	▼1
PML(Q)	71,357	6.16		1	1	Steady
IPP	47,722	4.12		1	1	Steady
PPP	47,520	4.10		2	1	▲1
TLP	31,589	2.73		4	0	
JUI (F)	125,999	10.87		1	0	
Total valid votes	1,158,606	98.59		153	12	
Rejected ballots	16,546	1.41				
Total votes polled	1,175,152	100				
Registered Voters	2,979,957	39.44				

=== Khyber Pakhtunkhwa Assembly ===
Party	Votes			Seats		
Party	No.	%	+/-	Contested	Won	+/-
PTI	30,559	29.97		2	1	
JI	10,544	10.34		2	0	
TLP	60,874	59.69		1	0	
Total valid votes	101,977	97.01		23		
Rejected ballots	3,143	2.99				
Total votes polled	105,120	100				
Registered Voters	400,214	26.26				

=== Balochistan Assembly ===
Party	Votes			Seats		
Party	No.	%	+/-	Contested	Won	+/-
ANP	72,032	31.76		1	1	
PMLN	49,853	21.95		2	1	
BNP(M)	28,175	12.42		1	1	
PkMAP	57,132	25.19		1	0	
TLP	19,688	8.68		1	0	
Total valid votes	226,813	98.30		35	3	
Rejected ballots	3,929	1.70				
Total votes polled	230,742	100				
Registered Voters	397,272	58.08				

=== Result by Constituency (National Assembly) ===
National Assembly
No	National Assembly Constituency	Winner				Runner-up				Margin		Turnout
No	National Assembly Constituency	Candidate	Party	Votes		Candidate	Party	Votes		Margin		Turnout
No	National Assembly Constituency	Candidate	Party	No.	%	Candidate	Party	No.	%	No.	%	%
1	NA-8 Bajaur	Mubarak Zeb Khan	IND	74,008	40.60	Gul Zafar Khan	PTI	47,282	25.94	26,726	14.66	28.04
2	NA-44 Dera Ismail Khan-I	Faisal Amin Khan Gandapur	PTI	66,879	70.06	Adul Rasheed Khan Kundi	PPP	21,979	23.03	44,900	47.03	24.5
3	NA-119 Lahore-III	Ali Pervaiz Malik	PMLN	61,086	61.25	Shahzad Farooq	PTI	34,197	33.74	26,889	27.51	19.12
4	NA-132 Kasur-II	Malik Rasheed Ahmed Khan	PMLN	146,849	60.86	Sardar Muhammad Hussain Dogar	PTI	90,980	37.71	55,869	23.15	45.80
5	NA-196 Qambar Shahdadkot-I	Khursheed Ahmed Junejo	PPP	91,581	96.42	Muhammad Ali	TLP	2,763	2.91	88,818	93.51	22.79

=== Khyber Pakhtunkhwa ===
==== NA-8 Bajaur ====
The general elections for Bajaur NA-8 had been postponed because of the murder of a candidate, Rehan Zeb Khan.

2024 Pakistani by-elections: NA-8 Bajaur
Party	Candidate	Votes	%	±%
PML(N)	Mubarak Zeb Khan	74,011	40.59	
PTI	Gul Zafar Khan	47,307	25.95	
TLP	Shaukat Ullah	20,023	10.98	
JI	Sahibzada Haroon Ul Rasheed	18,431	10.11	
ANP	Khan Zeb	12,019	6.59	
PML(Q)	Shahab Uddin Khan	6,469	3.55	
PPP	Akhunzada Chattan	4,076	2.24	
Turnout		187,374	28.05	
Total valid votes		182,336	97.31	
Rejected ballots		5,038	2.69	
Majority		26,704	14.64	
Registered electors		667,983		
PML(N) gain from PTI				

==== NA-44 Dera Ismail Khan-I ====
NA-44 Dera Ismail Khan, the constituency was vacated by Ali Amin Gandapur, who retained his provisional assembly seat to become KP’s chief minister.

2024 Pakistani by-elections: NA-44 Dera Ismail Khan-I
Party	Candidate	Votes	%	±%
PTI	Faisal Amin Khan Gandapur	66,879	70.06	▲25.89
PPP	Rashid Khan Kundi	21,979	23.03	▲6.14
TLP	Akhtar Saeed	2,289	2.40	▼2.06
PML(N)	Zameer Hussain	1,353	1.42	N/A
Others	Others (15 Candidates)	2,946	3.09	
Turnout		97,155	24.50	▼30.47
Total valid votes		95,446	98.24	
Rejected ballots		1,709	1.76	
Majority		44,900	47.03	
Registered electors		396,613		

=== Punjab ===
==== NA-119 Lahore-III ====
Lahore’s NA-119 was vacated by Punjab Chief Minister Maryam Nawaz, who preferred to become an MPA from PP-159

2024 Pakistani by-elections: NA-119 Lahore-III
Party	Candidate	Votes	%	±%
PML(N)	Ali Pervaiz Malik	61,086	61.25	▲18.66
PTI	Shahzad Farooq	34,197	33.74	▼0.99
TLP	Muhammad Zaheer	4,748	4.68	▼10.83
Others	Others (six candidates)	336	0.33	
Turnout		101,363	19.12	▼19.47
Total valid votes		100,367	99.02	
Rejected ballots		996	0.98	
Majority		26,889	27.51	
Registered electors		530,167		
PML(N) hold				

==== NA-132 Kasur-II ====
2024 Pakistani by-elections: NA-132 Kasur-II
Party	Candidate	Votes	%	±%
PML(N)	Malik Rasheed Ahmed Khan	146,849	60.86	▲14.78
PTI	Sardar Muhammad Hussain Dogar	90,980	37.71	▼0.39
Others	Others (eight candidates)	3,455	1.43	
Turnout		243,917	45.80	▼11.96
Total valid votes		241,284	98.92	
Rejected ballots		2,633	1.08	
Majority		55,869	23.15	
Registered electors		532,587		
PML(N) hold				

=== Sindh ===
==== NA-196 Qambar Shahdadkot-I ====
PPP Chairman Bilawal Bhutto-Zardari won two seats in the NA. He retained NA-194, Larkana, seat and left NA-196, Qamber Shahdadkot, seat vacant

2024 Pakistani by-elections: NA-196 Qambar Shahdadkot-I
Party	Candidate	Votes	%	±%
PPP	Khursheed Ahmed Junejo	91,581	96.42	▲33.36
TLP	Muhammad Ali	2,763	2.91	▼0.91
STP	Javed Ali	499	0.52	N/A
PML(N)	Buland Junejo	142	0.15	N/A
Turnout		96,572	22.79	▼12.10
Total valid votes		94,985	98.36	
Rejected ballots		1,587	1.64	
Majority		88,818	93.51	
Registered electors		423,781		
PPP hold				

=== Result by Constituency (Punjab Assembly) ===
No	Punjab Assembly Constituency	Winner				Runner-up				Margin		Turnout
No	Punjab Assembly Constituency	Candidate	Party	Votes		Candidate	Party	Votes		Margin		Turnout
No	Punjab Assembly Constituency	Candidate	Party	No.	%	Candidate	Party	No.	%	No.	%	%
1	PP-22 Chakwal-cum-Talagang	Malik Falak Sher Awan	PMLN	59,265	48.20	Nisar Ahmed	PTI	50,356	40.96	8,909	7.24	42.92
2	PP-32 Gujrat-VI	Chaudhry Musa Elahi	PML(Q)	71,357	63.75	Parvez Elahi	PTI	37,106	33.15	34,251	30.60	44.45
3	PP-36 Wazirabad-II	Adnan Afzal Chattha	PMLN	74,779	53.77	Fayyaz Chatta	PTI	58,682	42.19	16,097	11.58	44.38
4	PP-54 Narowal-I	Ahmad Iqbal Chaudhary	PMLN	59,234	53.40	Awais Qasim Khan	PTI	45,762	41.25	13,472	12.15	46.37
5	PP-93 Bhakkar-V	Saeed Akbar Khan Nawani	PMLN	62,201	44.83	Muhammad Afzal Khan Dhandla	IPP	58,888	42.45	3,313	2.38	64.95
6	PP-139 Sheikhupura-IV	Rana Afzaal Hussain	PMLN	46,585	57.00	Ijaz Hussain	PTI	29,833	36.50	16,752	20.50	43.90
7	PP-147 Lahore-III	Muhammad Riaz Malik	PMLN	31,841	61.39	Muhammad Khan Madni	PTI	16,548	31.90	15,293	29.49	13.97
8	PP-149 Lahore-V	Muhammad Shoaib Siddiqui	IPP	47,762	59.22	Zeeshan Rashid	PTI	26,253	32.55	21,509	26.67	23.60
9	PP-158 Lahore-XIV	Chaudhary Muhammad Nawaz Ladhar	PMLN	39,865	54.73	Moonis Elahi	PTI	28,018	38.46	11,847	16.27	39.80
10	PP-164 Lahore-XX	Rana Rashid Minhas	PMLN	31,199	53.28	Yousaf Mayo	PTI	25,781	44.03	5,418	9.25	41.39
11	PP-266 Rahim Yar Khan-XII	Mumtaz Ali Khan Chang	PPP	47,181	46.58	Safdar Khan Leghari	PMLN	34,552	34.11	12,629	12.47	45.78
12	PP-290 Dera Ghazi Khan-V	Sardar Ali Ahmed Khan Leghari	PMLN	62,529	71.19	Sardar Muhammad Mohiuddin Khosa	PTI	23,672	26.95	38,857	44.24	46.21

==== PP-22 Chakwal-cum-Talagang ====
Ghulam Abbas retained NA-53, Rawalpindi, seat and left PP-22 seat.

2024 Pakistani by-elections: PP-22 Chakwal-cum-Talagang
Party	Candidate	Votes	%	±%
PML(N)	Malik Falak Sher Awan	59,265	48.20	▲8.20
PTI	Nisar Ahmed	50,356	40.96	▼6.10
JUI (F)	Akram Abbas	7,442	6.05	N/A
TLP	Muhammad Idrees	5,341	4.34	▼1.53
Others	Others (five candidates)	548	0.45	
Turnout		124,526	42.92	▼15.58
Total valid votes		122,952	98.74	
Rejected ballots		1,574	1.26	
Majority		8,909	7.24	▲2.30
Registered electors		290,122		
PML(N) hold				

==== PP-32 Gujrat-VI ====
Chaudhry Salik Hussain retained NA-64 and vacated PP-32, Gujrat, seat.

2024 Pakistani by-elections: PP-32 Gujrat-VI
Party	Candidate	Votes	%	±%
PML(Q)	Chaudhry Musa Elahi	71,357	63.75	▲9.97
PTI	Parvez Elahi	37,106	33.15	▼10.16
TLP	Faisal Mehmood	1,553	1.39	▲0.45
Others	Others (ten candidates)	1,916	1.71	
Turnout		113,312	44.45	▲3.46
Total valid votes		111,932	98.78	
Rejected ballots		1,380	1.22	
Majority		34,251	30.60	▲20.13
Registered electors		254,903		
PML(Q) hold				

==== PP-36 Wazirabad-II ====
PP-36, Wazirabad, seat fell vacant after Muhammad Ahmad Chattha did not take oath

2024 Pakistani by-elections: PP-36 Wazirabad-II
Party	Candidate	Votes	%	±%
PML(N)	Adnan Afzal Chattha	74,779	53.77	▲22.60
PTI	Muhammad Fayyaz Chatta	58,682	42.19	▼13.24
TLP	Basirat Ali Abid	2,547	1.83	▼3.17
JI	Sikandar Nawaz	2,195	1.58	▲0.29
Others	Others (nine candidates)	878	0.63	
Turnout		141,364	44.38	▼6.87
Total valid votes		139,081	98.38	
Rejected ballots		2,283	1.62	
Majority		16,097	11.58	▼12.68
Registered electors		318,544		
PML(N) gain from PTI				

==== PP-54 Narowal-I ====
PP-54, Narowal, seat fell vacant as PML-N’s Ahsan Iqbal did not take oath. He preferred to retain NA-76, Narowal

2024 Pakistani by-elections: PP-54 Narowal-I
Party	Candidate	Votes	%	±%
PML(N)	Ahmad Iqbal Chaudhary	59,234	53.40	▲27.49
PTI	Awais Qasim Khan	45,762	41.25	▼17.04
TLP	Hafiz Muhammad Tariq	4,465	4.02	▼4.34
Others	Others (eleven candidates)	1,472	1.33	
Turnout		112,623	46.37	▲9.30
Total valid votes		110,933	98.50	
Rejected ballots		1,690	1.50	
Majority		13,472	12.15	▲10.45
Registered electors		242,857		
PML(N) hold				

==== PP-93 Bhakkar-V ====
2024 Pakistani by-elections: PP-93 Bhakkar-V
Party	Candidate	Votes	%	±%
PML(N)	Saeed Akbar Khan Nawani	62,201	44.83	N/A
IPP	Muhammad Afzal Khan Dhandla	58,888	42.45	N/A
PTI	Sikander Ahmed Khan	16,023	11.55	▼4.21
TLP	Shaukat Iqbal	1,286	0.93	▼3.52
JI	Shoaib Rasheed	187	0.14	N/A
JUI (F)	Faheem Ahmed Khan	151	0.11	N/A
Turnout		140,910	64.95	▼2.72
Total valid votes		138,736	98.46	
Rejected ballots		2,174	1.54	
Majority		3,313	2.38	▲1.07
Registered electors		216,957		
PML(N) gain from PTI				

==== PP-139 Sheikhupura-IV ====
PP-139, Sheikhupura, fell vacant because PML-N’s Rana Tanveer did not take oath

2024 Pakistani by-elections: PP-139 Sheikhupura-IV
Party	Candidate	Votes	%	±%
PML(N)	Rana Afzaal Hussain	46,585	57.00	▲17.57
PTI	Ijaz Hussain	29,833	36.50	▼0.74
TLP	Rafaqat Ali	4,899	5.99	▼12.62
Others	Others (three candidates)	412	0.50	
Turnout		83,055	43.90	▼6.04
Total valid votes		81,729	98.40	
Rejected ballots		1,326	1.60	
Majority		16,752	20.50	▲18.31
Registered electors		189,205		
PML(N) hold				

==== PP-147 Lahore-III ====
Hamza Shehbaz did not take oath for PP-147, Lahore

2024 Pakistani by-elections: PP-147 Lahore-III
Party	Candidate	Votes	%	±%
PML(N)	Muhammad Riaz Malik	31,841	61.39	▲20.09
PTI	Muhammad Khan Madni	16,548	31.90	▼5.14
TLP	Muhammad Yaseen	2,781	5.36	▼8.21
Others	Others (eight candidates)	700	1.35	
Turnout		52,349	13.97	▼20.73
Total valid votes		51,870	99.08	
Rejected ballots		479	0.92	
Majority		15,293	29.49	▲25.23
Registered electors		374,847		
PML(N) hold				

==== PP-149 Lahore-V ====
PP-149, Lahore, fell vacant because of IPP’s Aleem Khan not taking oath

2024 Pakistani by-elections: PP-149 Lahore-V
Party	Candidate	Votes	%	±%
IPP	Muhammad Shoaib Siddiqui	47,762	59.22	▲20.44
PTI	Zeeshan Rasheed	26,253	32.55	▼3.37
TLP	Abdul Razzaq	3,714	4.61	▼7.29
Others	Others (eleven candidates)	2,925	3.62	
Turnout		81,542	23.60	▼16.62
Total valid votes		80,654	98.91	
Rejected ballots		888	1.09	
Majority		21,509	26.67	▲24.44
Registered electors		345,448		
IPP hold				

==== PP-158 Lahore-XIV ====
PM Shehbaz Sharif won polls for two NA and two provincial legislature seats. He left the NA-132, Kasur, as well as Lahore’s PP-158 and PP-164 seats vacant, and retained NA-123, Lahore, seat.

2024 Pakistani by-elections: PP-158 Lahore-XIV
Party	Candidate	Votes	%	±%
PML(N)	Chaudhary Muhammad Nawaz Ladhar	39,865	54.73	▲9.30
PTI	Moonis Elahi	28,018	38.46	▼10.43
TLP	Majid Munir Awan	2,451	3.37	▼10.44
JI	Muhammad Saleem	2,210	3.03	N/A
Others	Others (seventeen candidates)	301	0.41	
Turnout		73,878	39.80	▼8.31
Total valid votes		72,845	98.60	
Rejected ballots		1,033	1.40	
Majority		11,847	16.27	▼1.13
Registered electors		185,616		
PML(N) hold				

==== PP-164 Lahore-XX ====
2024 Pakistani by-elections: PP-164 Lahore-XX
Party	Candidate	Votes	%	±%
PML(N)	Rana Rashid Minhas	31,199	53.28	▲13.87
PTI	Muhammad Yousaf	25,781	44.03	▼6.34
TLP	Mudasar Mehmood	1,372	2.34	▼8.04
Others	Others (sixteen candidates)	205	0.35	
Turnout		59,346	41.39	▼8.86
Total valid votes		58,557	98.67	
Rejected ballots		789	1.33	
Majority		5,418	9.25	▲7.53
Registered electors		143,395		
PML(N) hold				

==== PP-266 Rahim Yar Khan-XII ====
The polls for PP-266, Rahim Yar Khan, were postponed because of the death of a candidate.

2024 Pakistani by-elections: PP-266 Rahim Yar Khan-XII
Party	Candidate	Votes	%	±%
PPP	Mumtaz Ali Khan Chang	47,181	46.59	▲8.64
PML(N)	Muhammad Safdar Khan Leghari	34,552	34.12	▲11.71
PTI	Chaudhry Sami Ullah Jatt	14,627	14.44	▼1,57
TLP	Sahibzada	1,283	1.27	
Others	Others (sixteen candidates)	3,636	3.58	
Turnout		102,584	45.78	▼13.48
Total valid votes		101,279	98.73	
Rejected ballots		1,305	1.27	
Majority		12,629	12.47	▼3.07
Registered electors		224,103		
PPP hold				

==== PP-290 Dera Ghazi Khan-V ====
The PP-290, Dera Ghazi Khan, was declared vacant after Awais Leghari did not take the oath

2024 Pakistani by-elections: PP-290 Dera Ghazi Khan-V
Party	Candidate	Votes	%	±%
PML(N)	Sardar Ali Ahmed Khan Leghari	62,529	71.19	▲29.45
PTI	Sardar Muhammad Mohiuddin Khosa	23,672	26.95	▼13.45
Others	Others (five candidates)	1,630	1.86	
Turnout		89,627	46.21	▼7.71
Total valid votes		87,831	98.00	
Rejected ballots		1,796	2.00	
Majority		38,857	44.24	▲42.9
Registered electors		193,960		
PML(N) hold				

=== Result by Constituency (Khyber Pakhtunkhwa Assembly) ===
No	Khyber Pakhtunkhwa Assembly Constituency	Winner				Runner-up				Margin		Turnout
No	Khyber Pakhtunkhwa Assembly Constituency	Candidate	Party	Votes		Candidate	Party	Votes		Margin		Turnout
No	Khyber Pakhtunkhwa Assembly Constituency	Candidate	Party	No.	%	Candidate	Party	No.	%	No.	%	%
1	PK-22 Bajaur-IV	Mubarak Zeb Khan	IND	23,386	49.58	Abid Khan	JI	10,479	22.21	12,909	27.37	28.24
2	PK-91 Kohat-II	Daud Shah Afridi	PTI	23,512	42.86	Imtiaz Shahid	IPP	16,524	30.13	6,988	12.73	24.74

==== PK-22 Bajaur-IV ====
The general elections for NA-8, Bajaur, and PK-22, Bajaur, were postponed because of the murder of a candidate, Rehan Zeb Khan

2024 Pakistani by-elections: PK-22 Bajaur-IV
Party	Candidate	Votes	%	±%
PML(N)	Mubarak Zeb Khan	23,386	49.58	
JI	Abid Khan	10,479	22.21	
PTI	Gul Dad Khan	7,063	14.97	
ANP	Shah Naseer Khan	2,295	4.86	
JUI (F)	Noor Shah	1,835	3.89	
Others	Others (eight candidates)	2,115	4.48	
Turnout		49,669	28.25	
Total valid votes		47,173	94.98	
Rejected ballots		2,496	5.02	
Majority		12,907	27.37	
Registered electors		175,837		

==== PK-91 Kohat-II ====
Elections were scheduled to be held on 8 February 2024 but postponed due to death of an Independent candidate.

2024 Pakistani by-elections: PK-91 Kohat-II
Party	Candidate	Votes	%	±%
PTI	Daud Shah Afridi	23,512	42.86	
IPP	Imtiaz Shahid	16,524	30.13	
TLP	Abdul Samod	8,090	14.75	
PTI-P	Saif Ullah Rehman	6,032	11.00	
Others	Others (six candidates)	694	1.26	
Turnout		55,506	24.74	
Total valid votes		54,852	98.82	
Rejected ballots		654	1.18	
Majority		6,988	12.73	
Registered electors		224,377		

=== Result by Constituency (Balochistan Assembly) ===
No	Balochistan Assembly Constituency	Winner				Runner-up				Margin		Turnout
No	Balochistan Assembly Constituency	Candidate	Party	Votes		Candidate	Party	Votes		Margin		Turnout
No	Balochistan Assembly Constituency	Candidate	Party	No.	%	Candidate	Party	No.	%	No.	%	%
1	PB-20 Khuzdar-III	Mir Jahanzaib Mengal	BNP(M)	28,175	56.07	Mir Shafiq Ur Rehman Mengal	IPP	20,344	40.49	7,831	15.58	56.09
2	PB-22 Lasbela	Nawabzada Mir Muhammad Zarain Khan Magsi	PMLN	49,844	88.70	Shah Nawaz Hassan	PTI	3,869	6.89	45,908	81.80	40.95
3	PB-50 Killa Abdullah	Zmarak Khan Achakzai	ANP	72,032	55.22	Mir Wais Khan Achakzai	PkMAP	57,132	43.80	14,900	11.42	79.65

==== PB-20 Khuzdar-III ====
2024 Pakistani by-elections: PB-20 Khuzdar-III
Party	Candidate	Votes	%	±%
BNP (M)	Mir Jahanzaib Mengal	28,224	56.12	
IPP	Mir Shafiq Ur Rehman Mengal	20,346	40.46	
Others	Others (six candidates)	1,723	3.42	
Turnout		53,038	56.15	
Total valid votes		50,293	94.82	
Rejected ballots		2,745	5.18	
Majority		7,878	15.66	
Registered electors		94,451		
BNP (M) hold				

==== PB-22 Lasbela ====
2024 Pakistani by-elections: PB-22 Lasbela
Party	Candidate	Votes	%	±%
PML(N)	Nawabzada Mir Muhammad Zarain Khan Magsi	49,844	88.70	
PTI	Shah Nawaz Hassan	3,869	6.89	
PPP	Muhammad Hassan	2,253	4.01	
TLP	Anwar Ali	227	0.40	N/A
Turnout		57,015	41.00	
Total valid votes		56,193	98.56	
Rejected ballots		822	1.44	
Majority		45,975	81.81	
Registered electors		139,068		
PML(N) hold				

==== PB-50 Killa Abdullah ====
2024 Pakistani by-elections: PB-50 Killa Abdullah
Party	Candidate	Votes	%	±%
ANP	Zmarak Khan Achakzai	72,032	55.22	▲21.75
PMAP	Mir Wais Khan Achakzai	57,132	43.80	▼17.90
Others	Others (twenty one candidates)	1,281	0.98	
Turnout		130,816	79.65	▼2.34
Total valid votes		130,445	99.72	
Rejected ballots		371	0.28	
Majority		14,900	11.42	
Registered electors		163,753		
ANP hold				
