= Prince Ahmed Ali Ahmedzai =

Pakistani politician

Member of the Provincial Assembly of Balochistan
- In office August 2013 – 31 May 2018

Personal details
- Born: 3 February 1968 (age 58) Karachi, Sindh, Pakistan
- Party: Pakistan Muslim League (N)
- Relations: Ahmad of Kalat (paternal grandfather); Mir Suleman Dawood Jan (paternal uncle); Jam Ghulam Qadir Khan (maternal grandfather); Jam Mohammad Yousaf (maternal uncle); Jam Kamal Khan (maternal cousin)

Prince Ahmed Ali Ahmedzai is a Pakistani politician who was a Member of the Provincial Assembly of Balochistan from August 2013 to May 2018.

== Early life and education ==
Ahmedzai was born on 3 February 1968 in Karachi.

His father Prince Mohyuddin Ahmedzai Baloch, who died in 2021, was the son of Ahmed Yar Khan Ahmedzai, the Khan of Kalat, and he served as a federal minister under General Zia-ul-Haq. Through his mother, he belongs to the Las Bela princely family, his grandfather Jam Ghulam Qadir, his uncle Jam Mohammad Yousaf and his cousin Jam Kamal Khan having all served as chief ministers of Balochistan.

He has done graduation and is fluent in Balochi, English, Urdu as well the Lasi dialect of Lasbela.

== Political career ==
From 1990 to 1992, Ahmedzai served as an organizer for the Pakistan Muslim League (N) in the Lasbela District while from 1992 to 1996 he served as the chairman Town Committee Hub for the PML-N.

He ran for the seat of the Provincial Assembly of the Balochistan as a candidate of PML-N from Constituency PB-35 (Lasbela-II) in the 1993 Pakistani general election but was unsuccessful. He received 7,598 votes and lost the seat to Mohammad Saleh Bhutani.

He was elected to the Provincial Assembly of Balochistan as a candidate of PML-N from Constituency PB-44 Lasbela-I in a by-election held in August 2013.

On 3 January 2018, he resigned as advisor to Chief Minister of Balochistan. On 13 January, he was inducted into the provincial Balochistan cabinet of Chief Minister Abdul Quddus Bizenjo and was made Provincial Minister of Balochistan for Science and Information.

On 23 August 2023, he was made a minister in the caretaker Balochistan cabinet, being awarded the portfolio of commerce, energy and excise and taxation.
