= NA-257 Hub-cum-Lasbela-cum-Awaran =

Constituency of the National Assembly of Pakistan

- Constituency for the National Assembly of Pakistan
- Region: Hub District; Lasbela District; Awaran District
- Electorate: 368,218

Current constituency
- Created: 2018
- Party: Pakistan Muslim League (N)
- Member: Jam Kamal Khan
- Created from: NA-270 (Panjgur-cum-Washuk-cum-Awaran); NA-272 (Lasbela-cum-Gwadar)

NA-257 Hub-cum-Lasbela-cum-Awaran (این اے-257، حَب-کم-لسبیلہ-کم-آواران) is a constituency for the National Assembly of Pakistan. It comprises the districts of Lasbela, Awaran, and Hub from the province of Balochistan. It was created in 2022 out of areas from NA-270 (Panjgur-cum-Washuk-cum-Awaran) and NA-272 (Lasbela-cum-Gwadar).

== Assembly Segments ==
Constituency number	Constituency	District	Current MPA	Party
21	PB-21 Hub	Hub	Mohammad Saleh Bhootani	BAP
22	PB-22 Lasbela	Lasbela	Zarain Khan Magsi	PML(N)
23	PB-23 Awaran	Awaran	Khair Jan Baloch	NP

== Members of Parliament ==
=== 2018–2023: NA-272 Lasbela-cum-Gwadar ===
Election	Member	Party
2018	Mohammad Aslam Bhutani	IND

=== 2024–present: NA-257 Hub-cum-Lasbela-cum-Awaran ===
Election	Member	Party
2024	Jam Kamal Khan	PML(N)

== Election 2018 ==
General elections were held on 25 July 2018.

General election 2018: NA-272 Lasbela-cum-Gawadar
Party	Candidate	Votes	%
Independent	Mohammad Aslam Bhutani	68,804	36.32
BAP	Jam Kamal Khan	63,275	33.40
BNP (M)	Akhtar Mengal	41,866	22.10
Others	Others (ten candidates)	15,482	8.17
Turnout		199,918	56.02
Total valid votes		189,427	94.75
Rejected ballots		10,491	5.25
Majority		5,529	2.92
Registered electors		356,879	
Independent win (new seat)			

== Election 2024 ==
General elections were held on 8 February 2024. Jam Kamal Khan won the election with 78,469 votes.

General election 2024: NA-257 Hub-cum-Lasbela-cum-Awaran
Party	Candidate	Votes	%	±%
PML(N)	Jam Kamal Khan	78,649	43.97	N/A
Independent	Mohammad Aslam Bhutani	59,350	33.18	▼3.14
PPP	Abdul Wahab	18,817	10.52	N/A
Others	Others (fifteen candidates)	22,046	12.33	
Turnout		189,873	51.57	▼4.45
Total valid votes		178,862	94.20	
Rejected ballots		11,011	5.80	
Majority		19,299	10.79	
Registered electors		368,218		
PML(N) gain from Independent				

== See also ==
- NA-256 Khuzdar
- NA-258 Panjgur-cum-Kech
