= Sardar Ali Ahmed Khan Leghari =

Member of the Provincial Assembly of Punjab from Dera Ghazi Khan (2024–2029)

- سردار علی احمد خان لغاری

Member of the Provincial Assembly of the Punjab
- Incumbent
- Assumed office 29 April 2024
- Constituency: PP-290 Dera Ghazi Khan-V

Personal details
- Party: PMLN (2024-present)

Sardar Ali Ahmed Khan Leghari (Urdu: سردار علی احمد خان لغاری), also known as Sardar Ali Yousuf Khan Leghari, is a Pakistani politician who is member-elect of the Provincial Assembly of Punjab.

== Political career ==
Leghari won the 2024 Pakistani by-elections from PP-290 Dera Ghazi Khan-V as a Pakistan Muslim League (N) candidate. He received 62,484 votes while runner up Independent (PTI) Supported Pakistan Tehreek-e-Insaf, candidate Sardar Muhammad Mohiuddin Khosa received 23,670 votes.
