= Chaudhary Muhammad Nawaz Ladhar =

Pakistani politician

- چوہدری محمد نواز لدھڑ

Member of the Provincial Assembly of the Punjab
- Incumbent
- Assumed office 29 April 2024
- Constituency: PP-158 Lahore-XIV

Personal details
- Born: Lahore, Punjab, Pakistan
- Party: PMLN (2024-present)

Chaudhary Muhammad Nawaz Ladhar (Urdu: چوہدری محمد نواز لدھڑ) is a Pakistani politician who is member-elect of the Provincial Assembly of Punjab.

== Political career ==
Ladhar won the 2024 Pakistani by-elections from PP-158 Lahore-XIV as a Pakistan Muslim League (N) candidate. He received 40,165 votes while runner up candidate Moonis Elahi of Sunni Ittehad Council received 28,018 votes.
