= Mohammad Aslam Bhutani =

Pakistani politician

Muhammad Aslam Bhutani (also spelled Bhootani; Balochi: محمد اسلم بھوٹانی, born 2 October 1960) is a Pakistani politician who served as a member of the National Assembly of Pakistan from 2018 to 2022. He is the younger brother of Muhammad Saleh Bootani, former (caretaker Chief Minister of Balochistan).

== Life and career ==
He hails from Dureji, a small town in Hub District in the province of Balochistan, Pakistan. Bhutani received his early education in his native place before moving to Hyderabad, where he completed his Secondary School Certificate. He later earned a bachelor's degree from the University of Karachi. Prior to entering politics in 2002, he held senior positions in Pakistan's law enforcement agencies, including the Police Service, the Anti-Narcotics Force, and the Federal Investigation Agency.

== Political career ==
Bhootani has held several prominent positions in the political landscape of Balochistan. He served as Deputy Speaker of the Provincial Assembly of Balochistan for five years and later as Speaker of the Assembly from 8 April 2008 to 25 December 2012.

In the 2018 Pakistani general election, Bhootani won the National Assembly seat NA-272 (Lasbela-cum-Gwadar), defeating high-profile candidates including Jam Kamal Khan of the Balochistan Awami Party and Akhtar Mengal of the Balochistan National Party. He secured approximately 70,000 votes—the highest number of votes received by any candidate in Balochistan during that election.

Bhootani is also noted for his vocal criticism of the China-Pakistan Economic Corridor (CPEC). Representing Gwadar, a key site within the CPEC framework, he has consistently argued that the local population has not received tangible benefits from the multi-billion-dollar initiative.

On 21 May 2020, Bhutani filed a petition in the Balochistan High Court challenging the provincial government's nomination of filmmaker Javed Jabbar as Balochistan's representative on the National Finance Commission. Bhutani argued that Jabbar neither hailed from Balochistan nor possessed expertise in economics, raising concerns over the legitimacy of the appointment. Jabbar eventually resigned from the NFC citing "political opposition to his nomination'.
