= NA-270 =

NA-270 may refer to:

- NA-270 (Awaran-cum-Lasbela), a former constituency of the National Assembly of Pakistan
- NA-270 (Panjgur-cum-Washuk-cum-Awaran), a constituency of the National Assembly of Pakistan
