= Chaudhry Musa Elahi =

Member of the Provincial Assembly of Punjab from Gujrat (2024–2029)

- چوہدری موسٰی الٰہی

Member of the Provincial Assembly of Punjab
- Incumbent
- Assumed office 25 April 2024
- Constituency: PP-32 Gujrat-VI

Personal details
- Party: PML(Q) (2024-present)
- Parent: Chaudhry Wajahat Hussain
- Relatives: See Chaudhry family

Chaudhry Musa Elahi (Urdu: چوہدری موسٰی الٰہی) is a Pakistani politician who is member of the Provincial Assembly of Punjab, in office since 25 April 2024.

== Political career ==
Elahi was elected to the Provincial Assembly of Punjab from Constituency PP-32 Gujrat-VI as a Pakistan Muslim League (Q) candidate in the 2024 Pakistani by-elections. He received 63,536 votes while runner up candidate and his uncle Pervaiz Elahi, of Pakistan Tehreek-e-Insaf (PTI) and Sunni Ittehad Council (SIC) alliance received 18,327 votes. PTI alleged of rigging in the constituency. Qaisara Elahi, wife of Pervaiz Elahi, expressed her disbelief in media statements, stating that she "could never expect such a shameful act of rigging by her own brother."
