= Ahmad Iqbal Chaudhary =

Member of the Provincial Assembly of Punjab

- احمد اقبال چوہدری

Member of the Provincial Assembly of Punjab
- Incumbent
- Assumed office 29 April 2024
- Constituency: PP-54 Narowal-I

Personal details
- Born: 3 February 1985 (age 41) Narowal, Punjab, Pakistan
- Party: PMLN (2024-present)
- Parent: Ahsan Iqbal (father)
- Education: Lahore School of Economics; University of Pennsylvania

Ahmad Iqbal Chaudhary (Urdu: احمد اقبال چوہدری; born 3 February 1985) is a Pakistani politician who has been a member of the Provincial Assembly of Punjab since 29 April 2024.

Additionally, he's a development professional with a background in investment banking, urban development, and public administration. He has held positions in both the private and public sectors and is known for his work in local governance and sustainable urban development.

== Early life and education ==
He was born on 3 February 1985 in a Punjabi Rajput Sulehria family to Ahsan Iqbal in Narowal, Punjab, Pakistan. He holds a Bachelor of Science (Honors) degree from the Lahore School of Economics and a Master of Public Administration (MPA) from the Fels Institute of Government at the University of Pennsylvania, where he was recognized with the Institutional Service Award.

== Professional career ==
Chaudhary began his professional career as an investment banker with KASB-Merrill Lynch (now Bank of America Merrill Lynch) in Karachi. He later worked with international organizations such as the World Bank Group, the International Finance Corporation (IFC), and the WRI Ross Center for Sustainable Cities in Washington, D.C., focusing on climate finance, urban transport, and urban competitiveness. He also contributed to economic development projects at King Abdullah Economic City (KAEC) in Saudi Arabia. In 2016, he served as Head of Feasibility Studies for the KAEC, a development initiative valued at approximately $100 billion. In this role, he developed a long-term internal rate of return (IRR) model to support strategic planning by analyzing multiple land use scenarios.

== Political career ==
On 23 December 2016, Chaudhary was elected as Chairman of Narowal District Council. During his tenure, he chaired the Chief Minister Punjab’s Committee on Local Government Empowerment and served as a Technical Member of the Provincial Finance Commission. His policy work emphasized decentralization and fiscal empowerment of local governments.

In December 2023, his father Ahsan Iqbal was reported to be supporting his son's candidacy for a National Assembly of Pakistan seat in the 2024 Pakistani general election, citing his educational background and his role as Chairman of Narowal District Council. However, his son was later instructed to withdraw from the election race.

In January 2024, his motorcade was fired upon by unknown attackers. His opponent, Daniyal Aziz, claimed that the FIR was unfounded and intended to gain political advantage.

He was elected to the Provincial Assembly of the Punjab as a Pakistan Muslim League (N) candidate from PP-54 Narowal-I in the 2024 Pakistani by-elections held in April 2024. He received 60,351 votes while runner up candidate Awais Qasim of Sunni Ittehad Council received 46,686 votes.
