= Adnan Afzal Chattha =

Member of the Provincial Assembly of Punjab from Wazirabad (2024–2029)

- عدنان افضل چٹھہ

Member of the Provincial Assembly of the Punjab
- Incumbent
- Assumed office 29 April 2024
- Constituency: PP-36 Wazirabad-II

Personal details
- Party: PMLN (2024-present)

Adnan Afzal Chattha (Urdu: عدنان افضل چٹھہ) is a Pakistani politician who is member-elect of the Provincial Assembly of Punjab.

== Political career ==
Chattha won the 2024 Pakistani by-elections from PP-36 Wazirabad-II as a Pakistan Muslim League (N) candidate. He received 74,779 votes while runner up candidate Muhammad Fiaz Chattha of Sunni Ittehad Council received 58,682 votes.
