= Jam Ali Akbar =

Baloch politician

Jam Ali Akbar (Urdu: جام علی اکبر) belongs to the Lasbela royal house and is the former Provincial Minister of Balochistan Province. He has been a member of the Provincial Assembly of Balochistan twice.

== See also ==
- Jam Ghulam Qadir Khan
- Las Bela (princely state)
- Jam family of Lasbela
