= PP-149 Lahore-V =

Constituency of the Punjabi Provincial Legislature, Pakistan

- Constituency for the Provincial Assembly of Punjab
- Region: Lahore City in Lahore District

Current constituency
- Created: 2018
- Created from: PP-143 Lahore-VII & PP-144 Lahore-VIII (2002-2018); PP-148 Lahore-V (2018-2023)

PP-149 Lahore-V (پی پی-149، لاہور-5) is a constituency of Provincial Assembly of Punjab.

== By-election 2024 ==
2024 Pakistani by-elections: PP-149 Lahore-V
Party	Candidate	Votes	%	±%
IPP	Muhammad Shoaib Siddiqui	47,722	59.24	
SIC	Zeeshan Rasheed	26,200	32.52	
TLP	Abdul Razzaq	3,712	4.61	
Others	Others (eleven candidates)	2,922	3.62	
Turnout		81,444	23.58	
Total valid votes		80,556	98.90	
Rejected ballots		888	1.10	
Majority		21,522	26.71	
Registered electors		345,448		

== General elections 2024 ==
General election 2024: PP-149 Lahore-V
Party	Candidate	Votes	%	±%
IPP	Aleem Khan	51,756	38.78	
Independent	Zeeshan Rasheed (Note: Filed nomination papers as PTI candidate but ECP allowed him to run as an Independent)	47,998	35.92	
TLP	Abdul Razzaq	15,905	11.90	
JI	Usman Afzal	2,316	1.73	
Independent	Rana Javed Iqbal	2,253	1.69	
Independent	Muhammad Zahid Khan	2,226	1.66	
Independent	Nadeem Altaf Khan Sherwani	1,525	1.41	
PMML	Shaiman Butt	1,402	1.05	
Independent	Muhammad Shafiq	1,157	0.87	
Independent	Muhammad Jamshed Tariq	1,089	0.81	
PPP	Mirza Muhammad Idress	1,015	0.76	
Others	Others (twenty six candidates)	4,976	3.72	
Turnout		136,668	40.22	
Total valid votes		133,618	97.77	
Rejected ballots		3,050	2.23	
Majority		3,758	2.86	
Registered electors		339,816		
hold				

== General elections 2018 ==
General election 2018: PP-148 Lahore-V
Party	Candidate	Votes	%	±%
PML(N)	Shahbaz Ahmed	60,610	49.78	
PTI	Muhammad Ajasam Sharif	43,223	35.50	
TLP	Muhammad Bilal Ahmed	14,034	11.52	
PPP	Mirza Muhammad Idrees	1,224	1.01	
Others	Others (eleven candidates)	2,664	2.19	
Turnout		123,007	51.88	
Total valid votes		121,752	98.98	
Rejected ballots		1,255	1.02	
Majority		17,387	14.28	
Registered electors		237,110		

== General elections 2013 ==
Provincial election 2013: PP-143 Lahore-VII
Party	Candidate	Votes	%	±%
PML(N)	Choudhry Shahbaz Ahmad	57,919	71.42	
PTI	Mohammad Arshad Khan	16,424	20.25	
JI	Choudhry Muhammad Shoukat	1,990	2.45	
PPP	Haji Muhammad Ahmed	1,514	1.87	
Others	Others (twenty three candidates)	3,255	4.01	
Turnout		82,179	48.79	
Total valid votes		81,102	98.69	
Rejected ballots		1,077	1.31	
Majority		41,495	51.17	
Registered electors		168,423		

== See also ==
- PP-148 Lahore-IV
- PP-150 Lahore-VI
