= Finance department, Punjab (Pakistan) =

Punjab Finance Department
- محکمہ خزانہ پنجاب

Department overview
- Jurisdiction: Punjab, Pakistan
- Headquarters: Lahore
- Minister responsible: Mian Mujtaba Shuja-ur-Rehman, Minister of Finance, Punjab
- Department executive: Mujahid Sherdil, Finance Secretary
- Website: https://finance.punjab.gov.pk/

The Punjab Finance Department is a department of the Government of Punjab, Pakistan. It is responsible for supervision and control of provincial finances, preparation of provincial budget, formulation of financial rules and management of public debt. It is headed by a provincial minister with the coordination of a finance secretary.

== Functions ==
The major functions of Finance Department are:

- Management of public funds
- Framing of financial rules for guidance of departments
- Supervision of accounts of provincial departments
- Flotation and administration of provincial loans
- Administration of public revenue
- Audit matters of provincial receipts and expenditure

== Wings ==
Following are the main Wings of Finance Department to perform and manage the functions of the department:

- Budget Wing
- resource wing
- admin wing
- Regulations Wing
- Local Government Finance
- Economic Services Wing
- Education and Youth affairs wing
- Health and agriculture wing
- Monitoring Wing

== Attached Departments ==
=== Punjab Revenue Authority ===
Punjab Revenue Authority is Semi Autonomous Revenue Administration for the collection of tax on services in the province. After Eighteenth Amendment to the Constitution of Pakistan collection of sales tax on Services was transferred to provincial governments by federal government.

Inspectorate of Treasuries and Accounts Department Supervises and inspects District Accounts Offices (DAOs) and Sub-Treasuries across Punjab.

=== Local Fund Audit ===
Local Fund Audit (LFA) Department is responsible for personnel administration of the Treasuries and Local Fund Audit establishments.

=== Risk Management Unit ===
Risk Management Unit (RMU) is the fiscal guardian for projects using Public Private Partnership (PPP) approach for procurement of infrastructure projects.

=== Punjab Pension Fund ===
Punjab Pension Fund (PPF) Punjab Pension Fund, a body corporate, was formed after the promulgation of Punjab Pension Fund Act in 2007. The purpose of the Fund is to generate revenue for the discharge of pension liabilities of the Government. Punjab Pension fund is managing two tpes of funds, Punjab Pension Fund (PPF) and Punjab General Provident Investment Fund (PGPIF).

== See also ==
- Ministry of Finance
- Federal Board of Revenue
- Economy of Punjab
- Excise and Taxation Department
