= PB-22 Lasbela =

Constituency of the Provincial Assembly of Balochistan, Pakistan

- Constituency for the Provincial Assembly of Balochistan
- Region: Lasbela District

Current constituency
- Party: Balochistan Awami Party
- Member: Nawabzada Mir Muhammad Zarain Khan Magsi
- Created from: PB-44 (Lasbela-I)

PB-22 Lasbela (پی بی-22 لسبیلہ) is a constituency of the Provincial Assembly of Balochistan.

== By-election 2024 ==
2024 Pakistani by-elections: PB-22 Lasbela
Party	Candidate	Votes	%	±%
PML(N)	Nawabzada Mir Muhammad Zarain Khan Magsi	49,777	88.69	
Independent	Shah Nawaz Hassan	3,869	6.89	
PPP	Muhammad Hassan	2,253	4.01	
Independent	Anwar Ali	227	0.40	
Turnout		56,948	40.95	
Total valid votes		56,126	98.56	
Rejected ballots		822	1.44	
Majority		45,908	81.80	
Registered electors		139,068		

== General elections 2024 ==
General election 2024: PB-22 Lasbela
Party	Candidate	Votes	%	±%
PML(N)	Jam Kamal Khan	38,562	49.46	
PPP	Muhammad Hassan	18,373	23.57	
BNP (M)	Jhanzeb Qasim	6,337	8.13	
TLP	Rasool Baksh	5,595	7.18	
JUI (F)	Muhammad Naeem	4,184	5.37	
Independent	Shah Nawaz Hassan	2,197	2.82	
Independent	Muhammad Anwar Ronjho	1,134	1.45	
Others	Others (ten candidates)	1,580	2.03	
Turnout		82,032	60.08	
Total valid votes		77,963	95.04	
Rejected ballots		4,069	4.96	
Majority		20,189	25.89	
Registered electors		136,529		

== See also ==
- PB-21 Hub
- PB-23 Awaran
