= Syed Saeed ul Hassan =

Pakistani politician

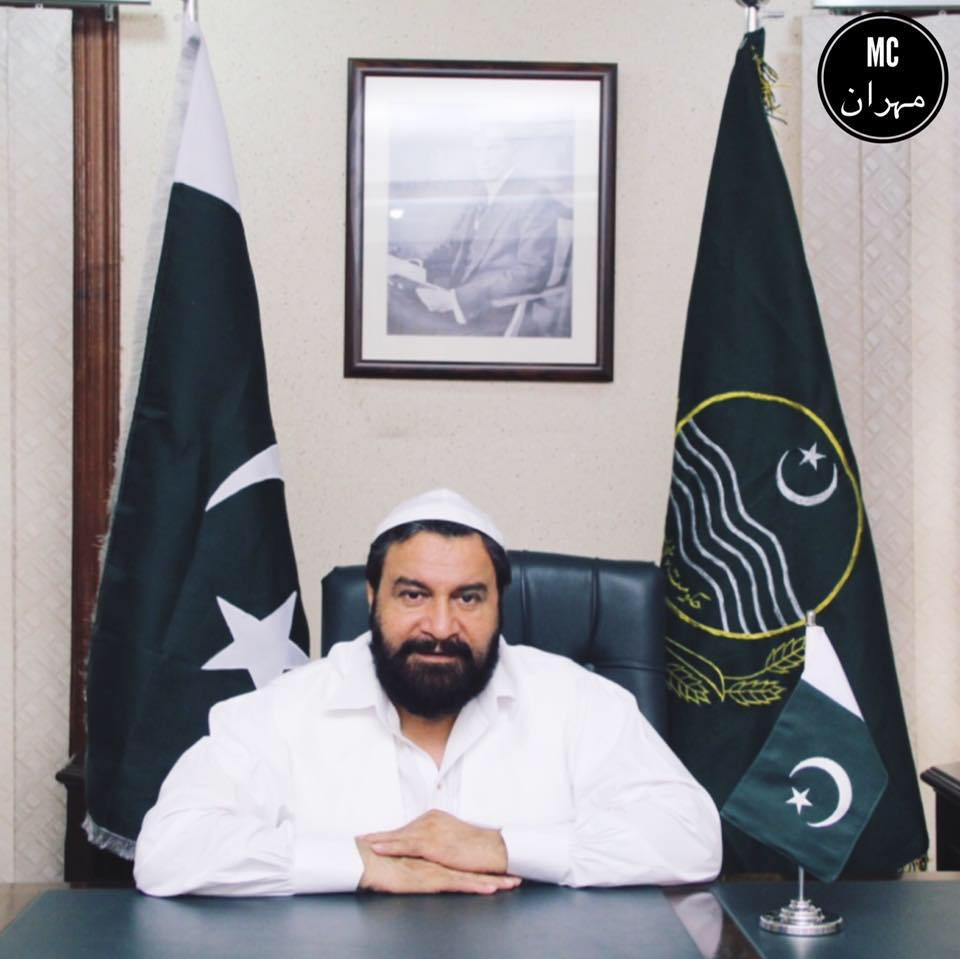

Provincial Minister of Punjab for Auqaf and Religious Affairs
- In office 13 September 2018 – April 2022

Member of the Provincial Assembly of the Punjab
- In office 15 August 2018 – 14 January 2023
- Constituency: PP-46 Narowal-I

Personal details
- Born: 13 October 1961 (age 65) Narowal, Punjab, Pakistan
- Party: IPP (2023-present)
- Other political affiliations: PTI (2018-2023); IND (2002-2018)

Syed Saeed ul Hassan is a Pakistani Sufi Pir. He is also a politician who was the Provincial Minister of Punjab for Auqaf and Religious Affairs, in office from 13 September 2018 till April 2022. He had been a Member of the Provincial Assembly of the Punjab from August 2018 till January 2023. He has been a member of the Pakistan Council of Islamic Ideology since January 2025.

== Early life and education ==
He was born on 13 October 1961 in Zafarwal.

He received the degree of Master of Arts in Arabic in 1983 from the University of the Punjab. He also holds a Bachelor of Arts degree.

== Political career ==
He was elected to the Provincial Assembly of the Punjab as an independent candidate from PP-132 (Narowal-I) in the 2002 Punjab provincial election. He received 29,759 votes and defeated Awais Qasim Khan. On 24 November 2003, he was inducted into the provincial Punjab cabinet of Chief Minister Chaudhry Pervaiz Elahi and was appointed Provincial Minister of Punjab for Religious Affairs and Auqaf.

He was re-elected to the Provincial Assembly of the Punjab as an independent candidate from PP-46 (Narowal-I) in the 2018 Punjab provincial election.

He joined the Pakistan Tehreek-e-Insaf (PTI) following his election.

On 12 September 2018, he was inducted into the provincial Punjab cabinet of Chief Minister Sardar Usman Buzdar. On 13 September 2018, he was appointed Provincial Minister of Punjab for Auqaf and Religious Affairs.

He ran for a seat in the Provincial Assembly from PP-46 Narowal-I as a candidate of the IPP in the 2024 Punjab provincial election.
