= Rana Rashid Minhas =

Member of the Provincial Assembly of Punjab from Lahore (2024–2029)

- رانا راشد منہاس

Member-elect of the Provincial Assembly of Punjab
- Incumbent
- Assumed office 24 February 2024
- Constituency: PP-164 Lahore-XX

Personal details
- Born: Lahore, Punjab, Pakistan
- Party: PMLN (2024-present)

Rana Rashid Minhas (Urdu: رانا راشد منہاس) is a Pakistani politician who is member-elect of the Provincial Assembly of Punjab.

== Political career ==
Minhas won the 2024 Pakistani by-elections from PP-164 Lahore-XX as a Pakistan Muslim League (N) candidate. He received 31,499 votes while runner up candidate Muhammad Yousuf of Sunni Ittehad Council received 25,781 votes.
