= Mian Mujtaba Shuja-ur-Rehman =

Pakistani politician

Provincial Minister of Finance for Punjab
- Incumbent
- Assumed office 6 March 2024

Member of the Provincial Assembly of the Punjab
- Incumbent
- Assumed office 24 February 2024
- Constituency: PP-148 Lahore-IV
- In office 15 August 2018 – 14 January 2023
- Constituency: PP-147 Lahore-IV
- In office 2002 – 31 May 2018

Personal details
- Born: 1 September 1967 (age 59) Lahore, Punjab, Pakistan
- Party: PMLN (2002-present)

Punjab Assembly Lahore

Mian Mujtaba Shuja-ur-Rehman is a Pakistani politician who is currently serving as the Provincial Minister of the Finance Department of Punjab, Pakistan in the Maryam ministry since March 2024. He is a member of the Provincial Assembly of the Punjab under the PML-N since 2024 and prior to that served as a member, from 2002 to May 2018 and from August 2018 till January 2023.

== Early life and education ==
He was born on 1 September 1967 in Lahore in a famous Arain Mian Family.

He has the degree of Master of Public Administration which he obtained in 1993 from University of the Punjab.

== Political career ==
He was elected to the Provincial Assembly of the Punjab as a candidate of Pakistan Muslim League (N) (PML-N) from Constituency PP-141 (Lahore-V) in the 2002 Pakistani general election. He received 20,017 votes and defeated Mian Liaqat Ali, a candidate of Pakistan Peoples Party (PPP).

He was re-elected uncontested to the Provincial Assembly of the Punjab as a candidate of PML-N from Constituency PP-141 (Lahore-V) in the 2008 Pakistani general election. During his tenure as Member of the Punjab Assembly, he remained Provincial Minister of Punjab for Excise and Taxation, Finance, Higher Education, School Education, Literacy & Non-formal Basic Education, and Transport.

He was re-elected to the Provincial Assembly of the Punjab as a candidate of PML-N from Constituency PP-141 (Lahore-V) in the 2013 Pakistani general election. He received 58,857 votes and defeated Choudhry Muhammad Nawaz Net, a candidate of Pakistan Tehreek-e-Insaf (PTI). In June 2013, he was inducted into the provincial cabinet of Chief Minister Shahbaz Sharif and was made Provincial Minister of Punjab for Finance with the additional portfolio of Excise and Taxation. He remained Minister for Finance from June 2013 to May 2015. In October 2014, he was given the additional portfolio Minister for Law and Parliamentary Affairs where he served until May 2015. In a cabinet reshuffle in November 2016, he was given the additional portfolio of Information and Culture besides Excise and Taxation.

He was re-elected to Provincial Assembly of the Punjab as a candidate of PML-N from Constituency PP-147 (Lahore-IV) in the 2018 Pakistani general election. He was officially re-elected as a PML-N candidate from PP-148-Lahore-IV in the 2024 Punjab provincial election.
