= PP-164 Lahore-XX =

Constituency of Punjab PA, Pakistan

- Constituency for the Provincial Assembly of Punjab
- Region: Lahore City in Lahore District

Current constituency
- Created from: PP-154 Lahore-XVIII (2002-2018); PP-162 Lahore-XIX (2018-2023)

PP-164 Lahore-XX (پی پی-164، لاہور-20) is a Constituency of Provincial Assembly of Punjab.

== By-election 2024 ==
2024 Pakistani by-elections: PP-164 Lahore-XX
Party	Candidate	Votes	%	±%
PML(N)	Rana Rashid Minhas	31,499	53.51	
SIC	Muhammad Yousaf	25,781	43.80	
TLP	Mudasar Mehmood	1,372	2.33	
Others	Others (sixteen candidates)	205	0.35	
Turnout		59,646	41.60	
Total valid votes		58,857	98.68	
Rejected ballots		789	1.32	
Majority		5,781	9.71	
Registered electors		143,395		

== General elections 2024 ==
General election 2024: PP-164 Lahore-XX
Party	Candidate	Votes	%	±%
PML(N)	Shahbaz Sharif	27,099	39.41	
Independent	Yusaf Mayo (Note: Filed nomination papers as PTI candidate but ECP allowed him to run as an Independent)	25,919	37.69	
TLP	Amjad Naeem	7,129	10.37	
PPP	Ghulam Mustafa	3,371	4.90	
JI	Iftikhar Ahmad	1,425	2.07	
Independent	Naveed Yousaf	1,082	1.57	
Others	Others (twenty three candidates)	2,742	3.99	
Turnout		70,519	50.25	
Total valid votes		68,767	97.51	
Rejected ballots		1,752	2.49	
Majority		1,180	1.72	
Registered electors		140,324		
hold				

== General elections 2018 ==
General election 2018: PP-162 Lahore-XIX
Party	Candidate	Votes	%	±%
PML(N)	Muhammad Yasin Amir	41,757	43.34	
PTI	Abdul Aleem Khan	41,032	42.59	
TLP	Muzaffar Hussain	4,971	5.16	
PPP	Ch. Atif Rafique	4,520	4.69	
Others	Others (fourteen candidates)	4,068	4.22	
Turnout		98,633	52.52	
Total valid votes		96,348	97.68	
Rejected ballots		2,285	2.32	
Majority		725	0.75	
Registered electors		187,809		

== General elections 2013 ==
General election 2013: PP-154 Lahore-XVIII
Party	Candidate	Votes	%	±%
PML(N)	Syed Zaeem Hussian Qadri	37,472	51.00	
PTI	Sajjid Sardar Joyia	21,007	28.59	
JI	Syed Ihsan Ullah Waqas	7,905	10.76	
PPP	Faisal Mir	1,718	2.34	
PML(Q)	Ch. Sarosh Tahir Gujjar	1,340	1.82	
SIC	Haji Rana Sharafat Ali Qadri	1,269	1.73	
Others	Others (thirty six candidates)	2,766	3.76	
Turnout		74,579	52.28	
Total valid votes		73,477	98.52	
Rejected ballots		1,102	1.48	
Majority		16,465	22.41	
Registered electors		142,662		

== General elections 2008 ==
Contesting candidates	Party affiliation	Votes polled

== See also ==
- PP-163 Lahore-XIX
- PP-165 Lahore-XXI
