= PK-91 Kohat-II =

Pakistani electoral district

- Constituency for the Khyber Pakhtunkhwa Assembly
- Region: Lachi Tehsil and Kohat Tehsil (partly) of Kohat District

Current constituency
- Party: Muttahida Majlis-e-Amal
- Member: Shah Dad Khan
- Created from: PK-39 Kohat-III (2002-2018); PK-81 Kohat-II (2018-2023)

PK-91 Kohat-II (پی کے-91 کوہاٹ-2) is a constituency for the Khyber Pakhtunkhwa Assembly of the Khyber Pakhtunkhwa province of Pakistan.

== Members of Assembly ==
=== 2024-: PK-91 Kohat-II ===
Election	Member	Party
2024	TBD	TBD

== Election 2024 ==
Elections were scheduled to be held on 8 February 2024 but postponed due to death of an Independent candidate.

2024 Pakistani by-elections: PK-91 Kohat-II
Party	Candidate	Votes	%	±%
PTI	Daud Shah Afridi	23,496	42.87	
Independent	Imtiaz Shahid	16,518	30.14	
Independent	Abdul Samod	8,090	14.76	
Independent	Saif Ul Rehman	6,009	10.96	
Others	Others (six candidates)	694	1.27	
Turnout		55,460	24.72	
Total valid votes		54,807	98.82	
Rejected ballots		653	1.18	
Majority		6,978	12.73	
Registered electors		224,377		

== See also ==
- PK-90 Kohat-I
- PK-92 Kohat-III
