= Mumtaz Ali Khan Chang =

Pakistani politician

Member of the Provincial Assembly of the Punjab
- Incumbent
- Assumed office 15 August 2018
- Constituency: PP-266 Rahim Yar Khan-XII

Personal details
- Party: PPP (2018-present)

Mumtaz Ali Khan Chang is a Pakistani politician who had been a member of the Provincial Assembly of the Punjab from August 2018 till January 2023, re-elected in April 2024.

== Political career ==
He was elected to the Provincial Assembly of the Punjab as a candidate of Pakistan Peoples Party from Constituency PP-266 (Rahim Yar Khan-XII) in the 2018 Pakistani general election.
