= PP-147 Lahore-III =

Constituency of the Provincial Assembly of Punjab, Pakistan

- Constituency for the Provincial Assembly of Punjab
- Region: Lahore City in Lahore District

Current constituency
- Created from: PP-141 Lahore-V (2002-2018); PP-146 Lahore-III (2018-2023)

PP-147 Lahore-III (پی پی-147، لاہور-3) is a Constituency of the Provincial Assembly of Punjab.

== By-election 2024 ==
2024 Pakistani by-elections: PP-147 Lahore-III
Party	Candidate	Votes	%	±%
PML(N)	Muhammad Riaz	31,841	61.39	
SIC	Muhammad Khan Madni	16,548	31.90	
TLP	Muhammad Yaseen	2,781	5.36	
Others	Others (eight candidates)	700	1.35	
Turnout		52,349	13.97	
Total valid votes		51,870	99.08	
Rejected ballots		479	0.92	
Majority		15,293	29.49	
Registered electors		374,847		

== General elections 2024 ==
General election 2024: PP-147 Lahore-III
Party	Candidate	Votes	%	±%
PML(N)	Hamza Shahbaz	51,838	41.30	
Independent	Muhammad Khan Madni (Note: Filed nomination papers as PTI candidate but ECP allowed him to run as an Independent)	46,494	37.04	
TLP	Azm Waheed	17,033	13.57	
JI	Muhammad Zia Uddin Ansari	2,390	1.90	
PMML	Sheikh Sadaqat Ali	1,704	1.36	
PPP	Amir Naseer	1,634	1.30	
Independent	Tahir Naveed	1,034	0.82	
Others	Others (seventeen candidates)	3,390	2.70	
Turnout		128,031	34.70	
Total valid votes		125,517	98.04	
Rejected ballots		2,514	1.96	
Majority		5,344	4.26	
Registered electors		368,998		
hold				

== General elections 2018 ==
General election 2018: PP-146 Lahore-III
Party	Candidate	Votes	%	±%
PML(N)	Hamza Shahbaz	71,393	54.67	
PTI	Zaman Naseeb	43,433	33.26	
TLP	Azm Waheed	11,457	8.77	
MMA	Bilal Ahmad Meer	1,780	1.36	
PPP	Noreen Saleem	1,393	1.07	
Others	Others (six candidates)	1,126	0.87	
Turnout		133,120	48.71	
Total valid votes		130,582	98.09	
Rejected ballots		2,538	1.91	
Majority		27,960	21.41	
Registered electors		273,296		

== General elections 2013 ==
General election 2013: PP-141 Lahore-V
Party	Candidate	Votes	%	±%
PML(N)	Mian Mujataba Shuja Ur Rehman	58,857	68.47	
PTI	Chouhadry Muhammad Nawaz Natt	23,188	26.98	
PPP	Haji Mian Shahid Abbas Advocate	2,218	2.58	
Others	Others (eighteen candidates)	1,696	1.97	
Turnout		86,896	51.18	
Total valid votes		85,959	98.92	
Rejected ballots		937	1.08	
Majority		35,669	41.49	
Registered electors		169,792		

== See also ==
- PP-146 Lahore-II
- PP-148 Lahore-IV
