= PP-33 Gujrat-VII =

Constituency of the Punjabi Provincial Legislature, Pakistan

- Constituency for the Provincial Assembly of Punjab
- Region: Kharian Tehsil (partly) including Lalamusa town in Gujrat District

Current constituency
- Created from: PP-112 Gujrat-V (2002-2018); PP-33 Gujrat-VI (2018-2023)

PP-33 Gujrat-VII (پی پی-33، گجرات-7) is a Constituency of Provincial Assembly of Punjab.

== General elections 2024 ==
Provincial election 2024: PP-33 Gujrat-VII
Party	Candidate	Votes	%	±%
PML(Q)	Syed Madad Ali Shah	35,492	23.79	
PPP	Nadeem Asghar Kaira	28,447	19.07	
Independent	Muhammad Omer Liaquat (Note: Filed nomination papers as PTI candidate but ECP allowed him to run as an Independent)	28,323	18.99	
PML(N)	Muhammad Ali	25,347	16.99	
TLP	Hafeez Hussain	13,008	8.72	
Independent	Chaudhary Muhammad Khalid Bashir	10,024	6.72	
JI	Syed Haider Ali	3,307	2.22	
Others	Others (thirty one candidates)	5,233	3.50	
Turnout		153,940	48.62	
Total valid votes		149,181	96.91	
Rejected ballots		4,759	3.09	
Majority		7,045	4.72	
Registered electors		316,651		
hold				

== 2018 Elections ==
General elections are scheduled to be held on 25 July 2018.

Provincial election 2018: PP-33 Gujrat-VI
Party	Candidate	Votes	%	±%
PTI	Chaudhry Liaqat Ali	51,139	36.78	
PML(N)	Shabbir Ahmed Chasti Nazimi	48,697	35.02	
TLP	Noman Atif	15,535	11.17	
PPP	Tanvir Ashraf Kaira	13,659	9.82	
MMA	Syed Zia Ullah	4,595	3.31	
Independent	Muhammad Jamil	1,894	1.36	
Others	Others (fifteen candidates)	3,524	2.54	
Turnout		141,725	51.12	
Total valid votes		139,043	98.11	
Rejected ballots		2,682	1.89	
Majority		2,442	1.76	
Registered electors		277,259		

== 2013 Elections ==
Provincial election 2013: PP-112 Gujrat-V
Party	Candidate	Votes	%	±%
PML(N)	Ch Muhammad Ashraf	39,428	37.44	
PPP	Tanveer Ashraf Kaira	18,399	17.47	
JI	Dr. Syed Ihsan Ullah Shah	17,579	16.69	
PTI	Ch. Zahid Hussain Advocate	13,254	12.59	
Independent	Ch. Ajaz Ahmed	5,287	5.02	
Independent	Ch. Muhammad Khalid Bashir Bhaddar	5,186	4.92	
Independent	Mehar Mobin Ali	2,329	2.21	
Independent	Malik Nasir Ali	1,020	0.97	
Others	Others (eighteen candidates)	2,830	2.69	
Turnout		109,438	53.33	
Total valid votes		105,312	96.23	
Rejected ballots		4,126	3.77	
Majority		21,029	19.97	
Registered electors		205,204		

== 2008 Elections ==
Provincial election 2008 : PP-112 Gujrat-V
Party	Candidate	Votes	%	±%
PPP	Tanvir Ashraf Kaira	39,965	45.93	
PML(Q)	Ch. Liaqat Ali Bhaddar	37,911	43.57	
PML(N)	Saif-ur-Rehman Bhatti Advocate	7,787	8.95	
Independent	Anjum Rasheed	667	0.77	
Independent	Ch. Abaid Ullah Bhaddar	291	0.33	
Independent	Naveed Akhtar Qureshi Advocate	213	0.24	
Independent	Lt. Col (R) Zafar Iqbal Choudhary	93	0.11	
Independent	Ghilman Tarq Kaira	88	0.10	
Turnout		89,679	55.28	
Total valid votes		87,015	97.03	
Rejected ballots		2,664	2.97	
Majority		2,054	2.36	
Registered electors		162,215		

== See also ==
- PP-32 Gujrat-VI
- PP-34 Gujrat-VIII
