= Nawabzada Mir Muhammad Zarain Khan Magsi =

Member of the Provincial Assembly of Balochistan from Lasbela (2024–2029)

- نوابزادہ میر محمد زرین خان مگسی

Member of the Provincial Assembly of Balochistan
- Incumbent
- Assumed office 29 February 2024
- Constituency: PB-22 Lasbela

Personal details
- Party: PMLN (2024-present)
- Relations: Jam Kamal Khan (Father-in-law), Mir Nadir Ali Khan Magsi (Uncle)
- Parent: Mir Amer Ali Khan Magsi (Father)

Nawabzada Mir Muhammad Zarain Khan Magsi (Urdu: نوابزادہ میر محمد زرین خان مگسی) is a Pakistani politician who is member of the Provincial Assembly of Balochistan.

== Political career ==
Magsi won the 2024 Pakistani by-elections from PB-22 Lasbela as a Pakistan Muslim League (N) candidate. He received 49,777 votes while runner up Independent candidate Shah Nawaz Hassan received 3,869 votes.
