= PP-158 Lahore-XIV =

Constituency of the Punjabi Provincial Legislature, Pakistan

- Constituency for the Provincial Assembly of Punjab
- Region: Lahore Cantonment in Lahore City of Lahore District

Current constituency
- Created from: PP-159 Lahore-XXIII (2002-2018); PP-163 Lahore-XX (2018-2023)

PP-158 Lahore-XIV (پی پی-158، لاہور-14) is a Constituency of Provincial Assembly of Punjab.

== By-election 2024 ==
2024 Pakistani by-elections: PP-158 Lahore-XIV
Party	Candidate	Votes	%	±%
PML(N)	Chaudhry Muhammad Nawaz	40,165	54.91	
SIC	Moonis Elahi	28,018	38.30	
TLP	Majid Munir Awan	2,451	3.35	
Independent	Muhammad Saleem	2,210	3.02	
Others	Others (seventeen candidates)	301	0.41	
Turnout		74,178	39.96	
Total valid votes		73,145	98.61	
Rejected ballots		1,033	1.39	
Majority		12,147	16.61	
Registered electors		185,616		

== General elections 2024 ==
General election 2024: PP-158 Lahore-XIV
Party	Candidate	Votes	%	±%
PML(N)	Shehbaz Sharif	38,642	45.43	
Independent	Yousaf Ali (Note: Filed nomination papers as PTI candidate but ECP allowed him to run as an Independent)	23,847	28.03	
TLP	Majid Munir Awan	11,744	13.81	
Independent	Chaudhary Muhammad Ali	4,525	5.32	
JI	Muhammad Ijaz	2,477	2.91	
Others	Others (twenty candidates)	3,819	4.49	
Turnout		87,149	48.11	
Total valid votes		85,054	97.60	
Rejected ballots		2,095	2.40	
Majority		14,795	17.40	
Registered electors		181,154		
hold				

== General elections 2018 ==
General election 2018: PP-163 Lahore-XX
Party	Candidate	Votes	%	±%
PML(N)	Naseer Ahmad	32,442	47.00	
PTI	Bilal Aslam	30,414	44.06	
TLP	Rana Muhammad Imran	3,493	5.06	
AAT	Abdul Rasheed	1,107	1.60	
Others	Others (fifteen candidates)	1,577	2.28	
Turnout		70,214	52.05	
Total valid votes		69,033	98.32	
Rejected ballots		1,181	1.68	
Majority		2,028	2.94	
Registered electors		134,897		

== General elections 2013 ==
General election 2013: PP-159 Lahore-XXIII
Party	Candidate	Votes	%	±%
PML(N)	Mian Muhammad Shehbaz Sharif	60,603	61.06	
PTI	Ali Imtiaz	19,350	19.50	
PPP	Muhammad Asif	6,108	6.15	
Independent	Muhammad Sarwar	3,096	3.12	
Independent	Ghulam Hussain	1,928	1.94	
JUI (F)	Muhammad Liaqat	1,899	1.91	
Independent	Khalid Hussain	1,337	1.35	
Others	Others (thirty seven candidates)	4,928	4.97	
Turnout		101,690	54.29	
Total valid votes		99,249	97.60	
Rejected ballots		2,441	2.40	
Majority		41,253	41.56	
Registered electors		187,298		

== General elections 2008 ==
Contesting candidates	Party affiliation	Votes polled

== See also ==
- PP-157 Lahore-XIII
- PP-159 Lahore-XV
