= PP-148 Lahore-IV =

Constituency of the Punjabi Provincial Legislature, Pakistan

- Constituency for the Provincial Assembly of Punjab
- Region: Lahore City in Lahore District

Current constituency
- Created from: PP-143 Lahore-VII (2002-2018); PP-147 Lahore-IV (2018-2023)

PP-148 Lahore-IV (پی پی-148، لاہور-4) is a Constituency of Provincial Assembly of Punjab.

== General elections 2024 ==
Provincial election 2024: PP-148 Lahore-IV
Party	Candidate	Votes	%	±%
PML(N)	Mian Mujtaba Shuja-ur-Rehman	38,000	40.34	
Independent	Saba Dewan (Note: Filed nomination papers as PTI candidate but ECP allowed him to run as an Independent)	31,562	33.50	
TLP	Muhammad Younas Jutt	18,287	19.41	
JI	Saif Ur Rehman	2,174	2.31	
Others	Others (twelve candidates)	4,182	4.44	
Turnout		95,855	36.25	
Total valid votes		94,205	98.28	
Rejected ballots		1,650	1.72	
Majority		6,438	6.84	
Registered electors		264,450		
hold				

== General elections 2018 ==
Provincial election 2018: PP-147 Lahore-IV
Party	Candidate	Votes	%	±%
PML(N)	Mian Mujtaba Shuja-ur-Rehman	63,301	57.02	
PTI	Muhammad Tariq Saadat	28,903	26.03	
TLP	Hafiz Muhammad Nawaz Butt	14,584	13.14	
MMA	Muhammad Shaukat	2,560	2.31	
AAT	Arshad Mahmood Butt	1,414	1.27	
Others	Others (two candidates)	261	0.23	
Turnout		112,548	47.77	
Total valid votes		111,023	98.65	
Rejected ballots		1,525	1.35	
Majority		34,398	30.99	
Registered electors		235,606		

== General elections 2013 ==
Provincial election 2013: PP-143 Lahore-VII
Party	Candidate	Votes	%	±%
PML(N)	Choudhry Shahbaz Ahmad	57,919	71.42	
PTI	Mohammad Arshad Khan	16,424	20.25	
JI	Choudhry Muhammad Shoukat	1,990	2.45	
PPP	Haji Muhammad Ahmed	1,514	1.87	
Others	Others (twenty three candidates)	3,255	4.01	
Turnout		82,179	48.79	
Total valid votes		81,102	98.69	
Rejected ballots		1,077	1.31	
Majority		41,495	51.17	
Registered electors		168,423		

== General elections 2008 ==
Contesting candidates	Party affiliation	Votes polled

== See also ==
- PP-147 Lahore-III
- PP-149 Lahore-V
