= Daud Shah Afridi =

Member of the Provincial Assembly of Khyber Pakhtunkhwa from Kohat (2024–2029)

- داؤد شاہ آفریدی

Member-elect of the Provincial Assembly of Khyber Pakhtunkhwa
- Incumbent
- Assumed office February 2024
- Constituency: PK-91 Kohat-II

Personal details
- Party: PTI (2024-present)

Daud Shah Afridi (Urdu: داؤد شاہ آفریدی) is a Pakistani politician who is member-elect of the Provincial Assembly of Khyber Pakhtunkhwa.

== Political career ==
Afridi won the 2024 Pakistani by-elections from PK-91 Kohat-II as a Sunni Ittehad Council candidate. He received 23,496 votes while runner up Independent candidate Imtiaz Shahid received 16,518 votes.
