= PP-93 Bhakkar-V =

Constituency of the Punjabi Provincial Legislature, Pakistan

- Constituency for the Provincial Assembly of Punjab
- Region: Bhakkar Tehsil (partly) of Bhakkar District

Current constituency
- Created: 2023
- Party: TBD
- Member: TBD
- Created from: PP-92 Bhakkar-IV

PP-93 Bhakkar-V (پی پی-93، بهكّر-5) is a Constituency of Provincial Assembly of Punjab. It was created after 2023 Delimitations when Bhakkar District gained 1 seat.

== By-election 2024 ==
2024 Pakistani by-elections: PP-93 Bhakkar-V
Party	Candidate	Votes	%	±%
PML(N)	Saeed Akbar Khan Nawani	62,058	44.79	
Independent	Muhammad Afzal Khan Dhandla	58,845	42.47	
SIC	Sikander Ahmed Khan	16,021	11.56	
TLP	Shaukat Iqbal	1,286	0.93	
Independent	Shoaib Rasheed	187	0.13	
Independent	Faheem Ahmed Khan	150	0.11	
Turnout		140,720	64.86	
Total valid votes		138,547	98.45	
Rejected ballots		2,173	1.55	
Majority		3,213	2.32	
Registered electors		216,957		

== 2024 Elections ==
General election 2024: PP-93 Bhakkar-V
Party	Candidate	Votes	%	±%
Independent	Muhammad Aamir Inayat Shahani	50,425	35.98	
Independent	Muhammad Zia Ullah Khan	45,580	32.53	
Independent	Sardar Sikandar Ahmad Khan (Note: Filed nomination papers as PTI candidate but ECP allowed him to run as an Independent)	22,084	15.76	
Independent	Choudhry Muhammad Nasrullah	10,795	7.70	
TLP	Behram Khan	6,235	4.45	
PPP	Muhammad Ali	1,357	0.97	
Others	Others (twelve candidates)	3,649	2.60	
Turnout		144,740	67.61	
Total valid votes		140,125	96.81	
Rejected ballots		4,615	3.19	
Majority		4,845	3.45	
Registered electors		214,070		
hold				

== See also ==
- PP-92 Bhakkar-IV
- PP-94 Chiniot-I
