= PP-92 Bhakkar-IV =

Constituency of the Punjabi Provincial Legislature, Pakistan

- Constituency for the Provincial Assembly of Punjab
- Region: Darya Khan Tehsil (partly) and Bhakkar Tehsil (partly) including Bhakkar city of Bhakkar District

Current constituency
- Created from: PP-48 Bhakkar-II (2002-2018); PP-92 Bhakkar-IV (2018-)

PP-92 Bhakkar-IV (پی پی-92، بهكّر-4) is a constituency of Provincial Assembly of Punjab.

== General elections 2024 ==
Provincial election 2024: PP-92 Bhakkar-IV
Party	Candidate	Votes	%	±%
Independent	Amir Inayat Shahni	41,592	33.95	
Independent	Rafiq Ahmad Khan Niazi (Note: Filed nomination papers as PTI candidate but ECP allowed him to run as an Independent)	33,121	27.03	
Independent	Naeem Ullah Khan Shahani	17,086	13.94	
JUI (F)	Muhammad Safi Ullah	9,953	8.12	
PPP	Malik Amjad Ali	7,193	5.87	
Independent	Habib Ullah Khan Shahani	4,810	3.93	
TLP	Muhammad Amjad Jameel	3,286	2.68	
Independent	Zaheer Abbas Naqvi	3,215	2.62	
Others	Others (nine candidates)	2,273	1.86	
Turnout		127,985	62.06	
Total valid votes		122,529	95.74	
Rejected ballots		5,456	4.26	
Majority		8,471	6.92	
Registered electors		206,239		
hold				

== General elections 2018 ==
Provincial election 2018: PP-92 Bhakkar-IV
Party	Candidate	Votes	%	±%
PTI	Muhammad Aamir Inayat Shahani	61,819	45.65	
Independent	Malik Zaheer Ahmad	53,406	39.44	
Independent	Aftab Ahmad	6,319	4.67	
JUI (F)	Muhammad Safi Ullah	3,967	2.93	
PPP	Farzana Parveen	3,256	2.41	
TLP	Muhammad Asghar	2,517	1.86	
Independent	Aamir Sohail	1,494	1.10	
Others	Others (four candidates)	2,633	1.95	
Turnout		139,365	65.32	
Total valid votes		135,411	97.16	
Rejected ballots		3,954	2.84	
Majority		8,413	6.21	
Registered electors		213,363		

== General elections 2013 ==
Provincial election 2013: PP-48 Bhakkar-II
Party	Candidate	Votes	%	±%
Independent	Najeeb Ullah Khan	33,473	34.02	
Independent	Abdul Rauf Qurashi	31,377	31.89	
PML(Q)	Malik Nazar Abbas Kohawar	12,499	12.70	
PPP	Alamdar Hussain	10,308	10.48	
Independent	Malik Anzar Ali Kohawar	7,748	7.87	
Others	Others (nine candidates)	2,983	3.03	
Turnout		103,977	68.33	
Total valid votes		98,388	94.62	
Rejected ballots		5,589	5.38	
Majority		2,096	2.13	
Registered electors		152,166		

== See also ==
- PP-91 Bhakkar-III
- PP-93 Bhakkar-V
