= PP-35 Wazirabad-I =

Constituency of the Provincial Assembly of Punjab, Pakistan

- Constituency for the Provincial Assembly of Punjab
- Region: Wazirabad Tehsil (partly) including Wazirabad city of Wazirabad District

Current constituency
- Created from: PP-104 Gujranwala-XIV (2002-2018); PP-51 Gujranwala-I (2018-2023)

PP-35 Wazirabad-I (پی پی-35، وزیر آباد-1) is a Constituency of Provincial Assembly of Punjab.

== General elections 2024 ==
Provincial election 2024: PP-35 Wazirabad-I
Party	Candidate	Votes	%	±%
PML(N)	Waqar Ahmad Cheema	60,975	38.82	
Independent	Muhammad Yousaf (Note: Filed nomination papers as PTI candidate but ECP allowed him to run as an Independent)	59,835	38.09	
TLP	Khuram Mukhtar Cheema	14,385	9.16	
JI	Muhammad Mushtaq Butt	9,866	6.28	
PPP	Ejaz Ahmad Samma	2,947	1.88	
Others	Others (thirty five candidates)	9,080	5.77	
Turnout		160,591	48.44	
Total valid votes		157,088	97.82	
Rejected ballots		3,503	2.18	
Majority		1,140	0.73	
Registered electors		331,496		
hold				

== General elections 2018 ==
Provincial election 2018: PP-51 Gujranwala-I
Party	Candidate	Votes	%	±%
PML(N)	Shaukat Manzoor Cheema	59,343	48.52	
PTI	Muhammad Shabir Akram	27,516	22.50	
MMA	Muhammad Mushtaq Butt	21,122	17.27	
TLP	Khuram Mukhtar Cheema	8,543	6.99	
PPP	Ejaz Ahmed Samma	2,788	2.28	
Others	Others (five candidates)	3,001	2.45	
Turnout		125,920	53.70	
Total valid votes		122,313	97.14	
Rejected ballots		3,607	2.86	
Majority		31,827	26.02	
Registered electors		234,511		

== General elections 2013 ==
Provincial election 2013: PP-104 Gujranwala-XIV
Party	Candidate	Votes	%	±%
PML(N)	Shaukat Manzoor Cheema	42,814	42.97	
Independent	Imtiaz Azhar Bagrri	16,687	16.75	
JI	Muhammad Mushtaq Butt	15,544	15.60	
PML(J)	Asif Mehmood Klair	9,910	9.95	
PTI	Adnan Sarwar Cheema	7,455	7.48	
PPP	Ejaz Ahmed Samma	3,867	3.88	
Independent	Muhammad Hafeez Khilji	2,310	2.32	
Others	Others (twelve candidates)	1,055	1.06	
Turnout		103,433	55.99	
Total valid votes		99,642	96.34	
Rejected ballots		3,791	3.66	
Majority		26,127	26.22	
Registered electors		184,749		

== General elections 2008 ==
Provincial election 2008: PP-104 Gujranwala-XIV
Party	Candidate	Votes	%	±%
PML(N)	Shoukat Manzoor Cheema	41,217	51.37	
PPP	Ajaz Ahmad Saman	23,576	29.39	
PML(Q)	Chohdary Muhammad Azam Akbar	15,068	18.78	
Independent	Jouher Sarwar Cheema	367	0.46	
Turnout		82,938	41.99	
Total valid votes		80,228	96.73	
Rejected ballots		2,710	3.27	
Majority		17,641	21.98	
Registered electors		197,514		

== General elections 2002 ==
Contesting candidates	Party affiliation	Votes polled

== See also ==
- PP-34 Gujrat-VIII
- PP-36 Wazirabad-II
