= NA-270 (Awaran-cum-Lasbela) =

Former constituency of the National Assembly of Pakistan

- Former constituency for the National Assembly of Pakistan
- Region: Awaran District; Lasbela District

Former constituency
- Abolished: 2018
- Replaced by: NA-270 (Panjgur-cum-Washuk-cum-Awaran); NA-272 (Lasbela-cum-Gwadar)

NA-270 (Awaran-cum-Lasbela) (Urdu: این اے-۲٧٠، آوارن-مع-لسبیلہ) was a constituency for the National Assembly of Pakistan.

== Election 2002 ==
General elections were held on 10 October 2002. Pir Abdul Qadir Al-Gillani of PML-Q won by 40,156 votes.

General election 2002: NA-270 (Awaran-cum-Lasbela)
Party	Candidate	Votes	%	±%
PML(Q)	Pir Abdul Qadir Al-Gillani	40,156	55.37	
PPP	Abdul Karim Lasi	17,143	23.64	
BNP (M)	Muhammad Usman	5,905	8.14	
MMA	Muhammad Suleman	4,718	6.51	
BNM	Abdul Wahab Bazanjo	2,242	3.09	
Others	Others (four candidates)	2,355	3.25	
Turnout		75,793	30.00	
Total valid votes		72,519	95.68	
Rejected ballots		3,274	4.32	
Majority		23,013	31.73	
Registered electors		252,610		

== Election 2008 ==
General elections were held on 18 February 2008. Jam Mir Mohammad Yousaf of PML-Q won by 50,476 votes.

General election 2008: NA-270 (Awaran-cum-Lasbela)
Party	Candidate	Votes	%	±%
PML(Q)	Jam Mir Muhammad Yousuf	50,476	54.63	
PPP	Nasrullah Roonjha	41,922	45.37	
Turnout		97,384	39.31	
Total valid votes		92,398	94.88	
Rejected ballots		4,986	5.12	
Majority		8,554	9.26	
Registered electors		247,737		

== Election 2013 ==
General elections were held on 11 May 2013. Jam Kamal Khan of PML-N won by 56,658 votes and became the member of National Assembly.

General election 2013: NA-270 (Awaran-cum-Lasbela)
Party	Candidate	Votes	%	±%
Independent	Jam Kamal Khan	56,658	56.74	
PPP	Ghulam Akbar Lasi	35,142	35.19	
BNP (M)	Mohammad Qasim Roonjho	3,593	3.60	
JUI (F)	Ghulam Qadir Qasmi	2,838	2.84	
Others	Others (six candidates)	1,629	1.63	
Turnout		104,492	43.78	
Total valid votes		99,860	95.57	
Rejected ballots		4,632	4.43	
Majority		21,516	21.55	
Registered electors		238,664		
