= PP-32 Gujrat-VI =

Constituency of the Punjabi Provincial Legislature, Pakistan

- Constituency for the Provincial Assembly of Punjab
- Region: Kharian Tehsil (partly) including Kunjah and Gujrat Tehsil (partly) including southern parts of Gujrat city in Gujrat District

Current constituency
- Created from: PP-110 Gujrat-III (2002-2018); PP-30 Gujrat-III (2018-2023)

PP-32 Gujrat-VI (پی پی-32، گجرات-6) is a Constituency of Provincial Assembly of Punjab.

== By-election 2024 ==
2024 Pakistani by-elections: PP-32 Gujrat-VI
Party	Candidate	Votes	%	±%
PML(Q)	Musa Elahi	71,357	63.75	
SIC	Parvez Elahi	37,106	33.15	
TLP	Faisal Mehmood	1,553	1.39	
Others	Others (ten candidates)	1,916	1.71	
Turnout		113,312	44.45	
Total valid votes		111,932	98.78	
Rejected ballots		1,380	1.22	
Majority		34,251	30.60	
Registered electors		254,903		
PML(Q) hold				

== General elections 2024 ==
General election 2024: PP-32 Gujrat-VI
Party	Candidate	Votes	%	±%
PML(Q)	Chaudhry Salik Hussain	55,615	53.78	
Independent	Parvez Elahi (Note: Filed nomination papers as PTI candidate but ECP allowed him to run as an Independent)	44,713	43.31	
Others	Others (twenty five candidates)	2,904	2.81	
Turnout		103,503	40.99	
Total valid votes		103,232	99.74	
Rejected ballots		271	0.26	
Majority		10,902	10.47	
Registered electors		252,448		
hold				

== General elections 2018 ==
Chaudhry Pervaiz Elahi won this constituency. General elections were held on 25 July 2018.

General election 2018: PP-30 Gujrat-III
Party	Candidate	Votes	%	±%
PML(Q)	Ch. Parvez Elahi	75,808	54.72	
PML(N)	Zulfiqar Ali Warraich	29,186	21.07	
TLP	Khalid Mehmood	20,308	14.66	
PPP	Ghulam Rasool	8,294	5.99	
AAT	Sajjad Ullah	2,378	1.72	
Others	Others (six candidates)	2,577	1.87	
Turnout		142,363	48.46	
Total valid votes		138,551	97.32	
Rejected ballots		3,812	2.68	
Majority		46,622	33.65	
Registered electors		293,757		

== General elections 2013 ==
General election 2013: PP-110 Gujrat-III

General election 2013: PP-110 Gujrat-III
Party	Candidate	Votes	%	±%
PML(Q)	Moonis Elahi	51,361	48.65	
PML(N)	Raza Ali Warraich	27,863	26.39	
PTI	Iftikhar Samma	16,322	15.46	
PPP	Tahir Mahmood	5,410	5.12	
JI	Ch. Sijjad Ahmad Warraich	1,896	1.80	
Others	Others (fourteen candidates)	2,721	2.58	
Turnout		108,491	55.65	
Total valid votes		105,573	97.31	
Rejected ballots		2,918	2.69	
Majority		23,498	22.26	
Registered electors		194,905		

== General elections 2008 ==
General election 2008 : PP-110 Gujrat-III
Party	Candidate	Votes	%	±%
PML(Q)	Ch. Moonis Elahi	47,529	53.80	
PPP	Ch. Nasir Samman	37,137	42.04	
PML(N)	Umran Ullah	3,672	4.16	
Turnout		90,099	52.71	
Total valid votes		88,338	98.05	
Rejected ballots		1,761	1.95	
Majority		10,392	11.76	
Registered electors		170,938		

== See also ==
- PP-31 Gujrat-V
- PP-33 Gujrat-VII
