= PP-36 Wazirabad-II =

Constituency of the Punjabi Provincial Legislature, Pakistan

- Constituency for the Provincial Assembly of Punjab
- Region: Wazirabad Tehsil (partly) and Alipur Chatha Tehsil of Wazirabad District

Current constituency
- Created from: PP-103 Gujranwala-XIII (2002-2018); PP-52 Gujranwala-II (2018-2023)

PP-36 Wazirabad-II (پی پی-36، وزیر آباد-2) is a Constituency of Provincial Assembly of Punjab in Pakistan.

== By-election 2024 ==
2024 Pakistani by-elections: PP-36 Wazirabad-II
Party	Candidate	Votes	%	±%
PML(N)	Adnan Afzal Chatta	74,779	53.77	
SIC	Muhammad Fayyaz Chatta	58,682	42.19	
TLP	Basirat Ali Abid	2,547	1.83	
JI	Sikandar Nawaz	2,195	1.58	
Others	Others (nine candidates)	878	0.63	
Turnout		141,364	44.38	
Total valid votes		139,081	98.38	
Rejected ballots		2,283	1.62	
Majority		16,097	11.58	
Registered electors		318,544		

== General elections 2024 ==
General election 2024: PP-36 Wazirabad-II
Party	Candidate	Votes	%	±%
Independent	Muhammad Ahmed Chattha (Note: Filed nomination papers as PTI candidate but ECP allowed him to run as an Independent)	87,549	55.43	
PML(N)	Adnan Afzal Chatta	49,228	31.17	
TLP	Waqas Ahmed	7,892	5.00	
PPP	Tahir Iqbal Cheema	3,224	2.04	
PMML	Muhammad Shoaib	2,764	1.75	
JI	Muhammad Ubaid Ullah	2,037	1.29	
Independent	Shahbaz Ahmed Chattha	1,417	0.90	
PAT	Muhmmad Badar Nisar	1,191	0.75	
Others	Others (twenty candidates)	2,629	1.66	
Turnout		161,636	51.25	
Total valid votes		157,931	97.71	
Rejected ballots		3,705	2.29	
Majority		38,321	24.26	
Registered electors		315,376		
hold				

== General elections 2018 ==
General election 2018: PP-52 Gujranwala-II
Party	Candidate	Votes	%	±%
PML(N)	Ch. Adil Buksh Chattha	55,159	43.52	
PTI	Muhammad Ahmad Chatha	54,097	42.69	
PPP	Syed Shahbaz Haider	5,438	4.29	
TLP	Qasim Shah Muhammad	4,803	3.79	
AAT	Ansar Javed Tarar	1,692	1.34	
PST	Javed Iqbal	1,507	1.19	
MMA	Mirza Taqi Ali	1,317	1.04	
PRHP	Saqib	1,307	1.03	
Others	Others (six candidates)	1,414	1.11	
Turnout		130,045	55.83	
Total valid votes		126,734	97.45	
Rejected ballots		3,311	2.55	
Majority		1,062	0.83	
Registered electors		232,918		

== General elections 2013 ==
General election 2013: PP-103 Gujranwala-XIII
Party	Candidate	Votes	%	±%
PML(N)	Akmal Saif Chatha	41,453	41.85	
PML(J)	Muhammad Ahmad Chatha	34,795	35.13	
PML(Q)	Ch. Akil Buksh Chatha	9,214	9.30	
PTI	Ch. Usman Talib Chatha	4,063	4.10	
MWM	Aqeel Raza	2,198	2.22	
PST	Muhammasd Asif Qadri	2,125	2.15	
Independent	Ch. Ali Asghar Cheema	1,927	1.95	
Others	Others (fifteen candidates)	3,279	3.30	
Turnout		101,593	67.24	
Total valid votes		99,054	97.50	
Rejected ballots		2,539	2.50	
Majority		6,658	6.72	
Registered electors		151,019		

== General elections 2008 ==
General election 2008: PP-103 Gujranwala-XIII
Party	Candidate	Votes	%	±%
PML(Q)	Hamid Nasir Chattha	32,229	39.91	
PML(N)	Chohdary Shaukat Hayat Chattha	31,440	38.93	
PPP	Chohdary Usman Talib Chattha	15,956	19.76	
Independent	Muhammad Ahmad Chattha	905	1.12	
Independent	Gohar Fatima Chattha	154	0.19	
Independent	Chohdary Muhammad Akhtar Islam Hanjra	64	0.08	
Independent	Aftab Akram Chattha	16	0.02	
Turnout		83,028	46.09	
Total valid votes		80,764	97.27	
Rejected ballots		2,264	2.73	
Majority		789	0.98	
Registered electors		180,126		

== See also ==
- PP-35 Wazirabad-I
- PP-37 Hafizabad-I
