= Awais Qasim Khan =

Pakistani politician

Member of the Provincial Assembly of the Punjab
- In office 2008 – 31 May 2018

Personal details
- Born: 19 August 1969 (age 57) Sialkot, Punjab, Pakistan
- Party: PTI (2018-present)
- Other political affiliations: PMLN (2018-2008); PML(Q) (2002-2008)

Awais Qasim Khan is a Pakistani politician who was a Member of the Provincial Assembly of the Punjab, from 2008 to May 2018. Chaudhry Owais Qasim is deeply loved by the people of Zafarwal and has changed parties more than five times. In the 2024 elections, Ahmed Iqbal Chaudhry has defeated Owais Qasim with a large lead in the by-elections.

== Early life and education ==
He was born in a Rajput Sulehria family on 19 August 1969 in Sialkot.

He completed his graduation from Forman Christian College in 1989 and has a degree of Bachelor of Arts.

== Political career ==
He ran for the seat of the Provincial Assembly of the Punjab as a candidate of Pakistan Muslim League (Q) (PML-Q) from Constituency PP-132 (Narowal-I) in the 2002 Pakistani general election. He received 14,835 votes and lost the seat to Syed Saeed ul Hassan, an independent candidate.

He was elected to the Provincial Assembly of the Punjab as a candidate of Pakistan Muslim League (N) (PML-N) from Constituency PP-132 (Narowal-I) in the 2008 Pakistani general election. He received 33,382 votes and defeated Syed Saeed ul Hassan Shah, a candidate of PML-Q.

He was re-elected to the Provincial Assembly of the Punjab as a candidate of PML-N from Constituency PP-132 (Narowal-I) in the 2013 Pakistani general election. He received 45,505 votes and defeated an independent candidate, Syed Saeed ul Hassan Shah.

In May 2018, he quit PML-N and joined Pakistan Tehreek-e-Insaf (PTI).
