= PP-54 Narowal-I =

Constituency of the Punjabi Provincial Legislature, Pakistan

- Constituency for the Provincial Assembly of Punjab
- Region: Zafarwal Tehsil (partly) including Zafarwal city of Narowal District

Current constituency
- Created from: PP-132 Narowal-I (2002-2018); PP-46 Narowal-I (2018-2023)

PP-54 Narowal-I (پی پی-54، نارووال-1) is a Constituency of Provincial Assembly of Punjab.

== By-election 2024 ==
2024 Pakistani by-elections: PP-54 Narowal-I
Party	Candidate	Votes	%	±%
PML(N)	Ahmed Iqbal Chaudhry	59,234	53.40	
SIC	Awais Qasim	45,762	41.25	
TLP	Hafiz Muhammad Tariq	4,465	4.02	
Others	Others (eleven candidates)	1,472	1.33	
Turnout		112,623	46.37	
Total valid votes		110,933	98.50	
Rejected ballots		1,690	1.50	
Majority		13,472	12.15	
Registered electors		242,857		

== General elections 2024 ==
General election 2024: PP-54 Narowal-I
Party	Candidate	Votes	%	±%
PML(N)	Ahsan Iqbal	33,243	25.91	
Independent	Awais Qasim	31,060	24.21	
IPP	Syed Saeed ul Hassan	24,950	19.45	
Independent	Javaid Mukhtar (Note: Filed nomination papers as PTI candidate but ECP allowed him to run as an Independent)	22,947	17.89	
TLP	Hafiz Muhammad Tariq	10,724	8.36	
Independent	Badar Ahsan Chaudhry	1,696	1.32	
Others	Others (nine candidates)	3,678	2.87	
Turnout		133,302	55.67	
Total valid votes		128,298	96.24	
Rejected ballots		5,004	3.76	
Majority		2,183	1.70	
Registered electors		239,442		
hold				

== General elections 2018 ==
General election 2018: PP-46 Narowal-I
Party	Candidate	Votes	%	±%
Independent	Syed Saeed Ul Hassan	37,388	35.95	
PTI	Awais Qasim	30,160	29.00	
PML(N)	Sajjad Ahmad	18,641	17.92	
TLP	Balqees Sarwar	15,210	14.63	
Others	Others (five candidates)	2,602	2.50	
Turnout		109,323	56.14	
Total valid votes		104,001	95.13	
Rejected ballots		5,322	4.87	
Majority		7,228	6.95	
Registered electors		194,723		

== General elections 2013 ==
General election 2013 : PP-132 Narowal-I
Party	Candidate	Votes	%	±%
PML(N)	Awais Qasim	45,505	52.16	
Independent	Syed Saeed Ul Hassan Shah	29,641	33.98	
PTI	Muhammad Akram	5,221	5.98	
Independent	Shahid Abbas Khan	3,393	3.89	
JI	Iftikhar Ahmad	1,951	2.24	
Others	Others (eight candidates)	1,532	1.76	
Turnout		91,364	59.92	
Total valid votes		87,243	95.49	
Rejected ballots		4,121	4.51	
Majority		15,864	18.18	
Registered electors		152,466		

== General elections 2008 ==
General election 2008 : PP-132 Narowal-I
Party	Candidate	Votes	%	±%
PML(N)	Awais Qasim Khan	33,382	48.74	
PML(Q)	Syed Saeed ul Hassan Shah	28,732	41.95	
PPP	Zaigham Mushtaq	5,887	8.60	
Independent	Ch.Naseer Ahmed Gujjar	483	0.71	
Turnout		70,736	55.91	
Total valid votes		68,484	96.82	
Rejected ballots		2,252	3.18	
Majority		4,650	6.79	
Registered electors		126,511		

== See also ==
- PP-53 Sialkot-X
- PP-55 Narowal-II
