= Mohammad Saleh Bhootani =

Pakistani politician

Chief Minister of Balochistan
- Caretaker
- In office 19 November 2007 – 8 April 2008
- Governor: Owais Ahmed Ghani; Zulfikar Ali Magsi
- Preceded by: Jam Mohammad Yousaf
- Succeeded by: Nawab Aslam Raisani

Provincial Minister of Balochistan for Local Government and Rural Development
- In office 8 September 2018 – 12 August 2023

Provincial Minister of the Balochistan for Food
- In office 30 August 2018 – 8 September 2018

Provincial Minister of the Balochistan for Law and Parliamentary Affairs
- In office 30 August 2018 – 8 September 2018

Member of the Provincial Assembly of the Balochistan
- In office 13 August 2018 – 18 August 2023
- Constituency: PB-49 (Lasbela-I)
- In office May 2013 – May 2018
- Constituency: PB-45 (Lasbela-II)
- In office 1985–1999
- Constituency: PB-35 (Lasbela-II)

Personal details
- Party: BAP (2018-present)
- Relatives: Mohammad Aslam Bhutani (brother)

Sardar Mohammad Saleh Bhootani is a Pakistani politician, who served as the Provincial Minister for Local Government and Rural Development from 8 September 2018 to 12 August 2023. He was a member of the Provincial Assembly of Balochistan during the same period.

Earlier, he briefly held the portfolio of Provincial Minister for Food, Law and Parliamentary Affairs from 30 August to 8 September 2018. Bhootani has had a long-standing political career, having first served as a member of the Balochistan Assembly from 1985 to 1999 and later from May 2013 to May 2018. He also held the position of Caretaker Chief Minister of Balochistan from November 2007 to April 2008.

His hometown is Dureji which is located in Hub District, Balochistan, Pakistan.

== Political career ==
He was elected to the Provincial Assembly of the Balochistan as a candidate of the Pakistan Muslim League (PML) from Constituency PB-35 (Lasbela-II) in the 1985 Pakistani general election.

He was re-elected to the Provincial Assembly of the Balochistan as a candidate of Islami Jamhoori Ittehad (IJI) from Constituency PB-35 (Lasbela-II) in the 1988 Pakistani general election. He received 11,950 votes and defeated Sheikh Ghulam Rasool, a candidate of Pakistan Peoples Party (PPP).

He was re-elected to the Provincial Assembly of the Balochistan as an independent candidate from Constituency PB-35 (Lasbela-II) in the 1990 Pakistani general election. He received 8,945 votes and defeated Muhammad Hassan, a candidate of Pakistan Democratic Alliance (PDA).

He was re-elected to the Provincial Assembly of the Balochistan as a candidate of PPP from Constituency PB-35 (Lasbela-II) in the 1993 Pakistani general election. He received 13,657 votes and defeated Prince Ahmed Ali Ahmedzai.

He was re-elected to the Provincial Assembly of the Balochistan as an independent candidate from Constituency PB-35 (Lasbela-II) in the 1997 Pakistani general election. He received 9,876 votes and defeated Abdul Majeed, a candidate of Balochistan National Party (Mengal) (BNP-M).

He ran for the seat of the Provincial Assembly of the Balochistan as a candidate of BNP-M from Constituency PB-45 (Lasbela-II) in the 2002 Pakistani general election but was unsuccessful. He received 318 votes and lost the seat to Mohammad Aslam Bhutani.

He became caretaker Chief Minister of Balochistan on 19 November 2007 after the Balochistan assembly was dissolved on completion of its five-year term. He continued to serve as caretaker Chief Minister of Balochistan till 8 April 2008.

He was re-elected to the Provincial Assembly of the Balochistan as an independent candidate from Constituency PB-45 (Lasbela-II) in the 2013 Pakistani general election. He received 25,752 votes and defeated Jam Kamal Khan.

He was re-elected to the Provincial Assembly of the Balochistan as a candidate of Balochistan Awami Party (BAP) from Constituency PB-49 (Lasbela-I) in the 2018 Pakistani general election.

On 27 August 2018, he was inducted into the provincial Balochistan cabinet of Chief Minister of Jam Kamal Khan. On 30 August, he was appointed Provincial Minister of Balochistan for food, with the additional ministerial portfolio of law and parliamentary affairs. On 8 September, he was redesignated as Provincial Minister of Balochistan for Local Government and Rural Development.

== Hub District ==
Hub District is created after bifurcating Lasbela District. Sardar Muhammad Saleh Bhootani confirmed that the creation of Hub District is a long-standing demand of the people of PB-49 constituency. It contains the tehsils Hub, Sonmiani, Gadani, Sakran and Dureji.
