= PB-21 Hub =

Constituency of the Provincial Assembly of Balochistan, Pakistan

- Constituency for the Provincial Assembly of Balochistan
- Region: Hub District

Current constituency
- Party: Balochistan Awami Party
- Member: Mohammad Saleh Bhootani
- Created from: PB-45 (Lasbela-II)

PB-21 Hub (پی بی-21 حَب)is a constituency of the Provincial Assembly of Balochistan.

== General elections 2024 ==
Provincial election 2024: PB-21 Hub
Party	Candidate	Votes	%	±%
BAP	Mohammad Saleh Bhootani	30,910	42.15	
NP	Rajab Ali Rind	17,000	23.18	
PPP	Ali Hassan Zehri	14,120	19.26	
TLP	Naveed Akbar	4,421	6.03	
JUI (F)	Ghulam Qadir	2,351	3.21	
Independent	Sikandar Khan	1,716	2.34	
Others	Others (fourteen candidates)	2,810	3.83	
Turnout		76,976	55.15	
Total valid votes		73,328	95.26	
Rejected ballots		3,648	4.74	
Majority		13,910	18.97	
Registered electors		139,585		

== See also ==
- PB-20 Khuzdar-III
- PB-22 Lasbela
