= Jam Ghulam Qadir Khan =

Former Jam of Lasbela

Mir Sir Ghulam Qadir Khan Korejo OBE CIE

2nd & 4th Chief Minister of Balochistan
- In office 27 April 1973 – 31 December 1974
- Governor: Akbar Bugti
- Preceded by: Governor's rule for 2 months Ataullah Mengal (Before Governor's rule)
- Succeeded by: Governor's rule
- In office 6 April 1985 – 29 May 1988
- Governor: Khushdil Khan; Musa Khan
- Preceded by: Martial law
- Succeeded by: Zafarullah Khan Jamali

11th Jam of Lasbela
- Preceded by: Jam Ghulam Mohammad Khan
- Succeeded by: Jam Mohammad Yousaf

Personal details
- Born: 1920 Lasbela, Balochistan, British India
- Died: 10 September 1988 (aged 67-68) London, England, UK
- Party: Pakistan Peoples Party
- Children: Jam Mohammad Yousaf

Jam Mir Sir Ghulam Qadir Khan Korejo (Urdu: جام غلام قادرخان عالياني) was the 11th Jam of Lasbela who also served as the 2nd Chief Minister of Balochistan. He belonged to the Korejo Samma tribe.

== Career ==
In the 1971 Pakistani general election, Qadir was elected for the 1st Provincial Assembly of Balochistan, being ticket holder of Pakistan Muslim League.

Ghulam Qadir was the father of Jam Mohammad Yousaf and the grandfather of Jam Kamal Khan, both Pakistani politicians who served as Chief Ministers of Balochistan.

== See also ==
- Jam Mohammad Yousaf
- Jam family of Lasbela

Political offices
Preceded by Ataullah Mengal	Chief Minister of Balochistan; 1973 – 1974	Succeeded by Governor's rule
Preceded by Martial law	Chief Minister of Balochistan; 1985 – 1988	Succeeded by Zafarullah Khan Jamali
