= PP-34 Gujrat-VIII =

Constituency of the Provincial Assembly of Punjab, Pakistan

- Constituency for the Provincial Assembly of Punjab
- Region: Kharian Tehsil (partly) including Dinga town and Kunjah Tehsil (partly) in Gujrat District

Current constituency
- Created from: PP-113 Gujrat-VI (2002-2018); PP-32 Gujrat-V (2018-2023)

PP-34 Gujrat-VIII (پی پی-34، گجرات-8) is a Constituency of Provincial Assembly of Punjab. It comprises Dinga, Karnana, Pakistan and many villages.

== General elections 2024 ==
Provincial election 2024: PP-34 Gujrat-VIII
Party	Candidate	Votes	%	±%
PML(Q)	Chaudhry Ijaz Ahmad	46,774	36.05	
Independent	Samaira Elahee Chauhan (Note: Filed nomination papers as PTI candidate but ECP allowed him to run as an Independent)	33,867	26.10	
PML(N)	Mian Tariq Mahmood	26,787	20.65	
TLP	Chaudhry Farukh Imran Bilal	9,478	7.31	
PPP	Mian Khalid Rafiq	7,479	5.77	
Others	Others (eleven candidates)	5,356	4.12	
Turnout		133,986	49.70	
Total valid votes		129,741	96.83	
Rejected ballots		4,245	3.17	
Majority		12,907	9.95	
Registered electors		269,602		
hold				

== General elections 2018 ==
Provincial election 2018: PP-32 Gujrat-V
Party	Candidate	Votes	%	±%
PTI	Mian Muhammad Akhtar Hayat	42,264	33.11	
PML(N)	Mian Tariq Mehmood	37,569	29.43	
TLP	Ch. ijaz Ahmad	30,583	23.96	
MMA	Mian Idrees Ahmed	5,486	4.30	
Independent	Sajid Mehmood	4,146	3.25	
TLI	Majid Mehmood Butt	4,104	3.22	
Others	Others (three candidates)	3,494	2.74	
Turnout		133,991	47.35	
Total valid votes		127,646	95.27	
Rejected ballots		6,345	4.73	
Majority		4,695	3.68	
Registered electors		282,955		

== General elections 2013 ==
Provincial election 2013: PP-113 Gujrat-VI
Party	Candidate	Votes	%	±%
PML(N)	Mian Tariq Mehmood	51,586	47.86	
PML(Q)	Ijaz Ahmed	34,917	32.40	
PTI	Ch. Sharafat Hussain Advocate	16,018	14.86	
JI	Ch. Abdul Sattar	3,461	3.21	
Others	Others (seven candidates)	1,800	1.67	
Turnout		111,681	53.60	
Total valid votes		107,782	96.51	
Rejected ballots		3,899	3.49	
Majority		16,669	15.46	
Registered electors		208,362		

== General elections 2008 ==
Provincial election 2008: PP-113 Gujrat-VI
Party	Candidate	Votes	%	±%
PML(Q)	Mian Tariq Mehmood	34,924	41.15	
PML(N)	Ch. Jafar Iqbal	34,705	40.89	
PPP	Mian Khalid Rafique	14,389	16.95	
Independent	Khalid Hussain Advocate	458	0.54	
Independent	Ch. Arshad Mehmood	324	0.38	
Independent	Ch. Ali Riaz Advocate	73	0.09	
Turnout		89,024	55.61	
Total valid votes		84,873	95.34	
Rejected ballots		4,151	4.66	
Majority		219	0.26	
Registered electors		160,095		

== See also ==
- PP-33 Gujrat-VII
- PP-35 Wazirabad-I
