= PP-266 Rahim Yar Khan-XII =

Constituency of the Punjabi Provincial Legislature, Pakistan

- Constituency for the Provincial Assembly of Punjab
- Region: Sadiqabad Tehsil (partly) Machka enclaves of Rahim Yar Khan District

Current constituency
- Created from: PP-297 Rahimyar Khan-XIII (2002-2018); PP-266 Rahim Yar Khan-XII (2018-)

PP-266 Rahim Yar Khan-XII (پی پی-266، رحیم یار خان-12) is a Constituency of Provincial Assembly of Punjab.

== General elections 2024 ==
2024 Pakistani by-elections: PP-266 Rahim Yar Khan-XII
Party	Candidate	Votes	%	±%
PPP	Mumtaz Ali	47,181	46.59	▲8.64
PML(N)	Muhammad Safdar Khan Leghari	34,552	34.12	▲11.71
SIC	Chaudhry Sami Ullah Jatt	14,627	14.44	N/A
Independent	Sahibzada	1,283	1.27	N/A
Others	Others (sixteen candidates)	3,636	3.58	
Turnout		102,584	45.78	▼13.48
Total valid votes		101,279	98.73	
Rejected ballots		1,305	1.27	
Majority		12,629	12.47	▼3.07
Registered electors		224,103		
PPP hold				

== General elections 2018 ==
Provincial election 2018: PP-266 Rahim Yar Khan XII
Party	Candidate	Votes	%	±%
PPP	Mumtaz Ali	35,370	37.96	
PML(N)	Shaukat Daud	20,886	22.41	
PTI	Muhammad Akmal	18,821	20.20	
Independent	Nadeem Abbas Cheema	4,161	4.47	
MMA	Uzair Ahmad	2,661	2.86	
Independent	Khalil Ur Rehman Khan	2,450	2.63	
Independent	Farhad Ali	2,101	2.26	
Independent	Abdul Jabbar	1,504	1.61	
Independent	Zahid Nawaz	1,410	1.51	
Independent	Aun Muhammad Khan Laghari	1,254	1.35	
TLP	Kalsoom Akhtar	944	1.01	
Others	Others (eleven candidates)	1,628	1.73	.
Turnout		96,923	59.26	
Total valid votes		93,190	96.15	
Rejected ballots		3,733	3.85	
Majority		14,484	15.55	
Registered electors		163,552		

== General elections 2013 ==
Provincial election 2013: PP-297 Rahim Yar Khan XIII
Party	Candidate	Votes	%	±%
PPP	Rais Ibrahim Khalil Ahmed	43,292	53.34	
PTI	Sardar Shafique Haider Khan Leghari	24,478	30.16	
Bahawalpur National Awami Party	Sohail Ahmed Abbasi	4,322	5.33	
JI	Muhammad Khalid	1,859	2.29	
Independent	Sardar Shoukar Ali Khan Solangi	1,736	2.14	
Independent	Abdul Malik Khan Jatoi Advocate	1,457	1.80	
Independent	Rais Munir Ahmed	1,179	1.45	
Others	Others (nine candidates)	2,834	3.49	
Turnout		84,398	60.53	
Total valid votes		81,157	96.16	
Rejected ballots		3,241	3.84	
Majority		18,814	23.18	
Registered electors		139,435		

== General elections 2008 ==
Contesting candidates	Party affiliation	Votes polled

== See also ==
- PP-265 Rahim Yar Khan-XI
- PP-267 Rahim Yar Khan-XIII
