= Moonis Elahi =

Pakistani politician (born 1976)

- مونس الٰہی
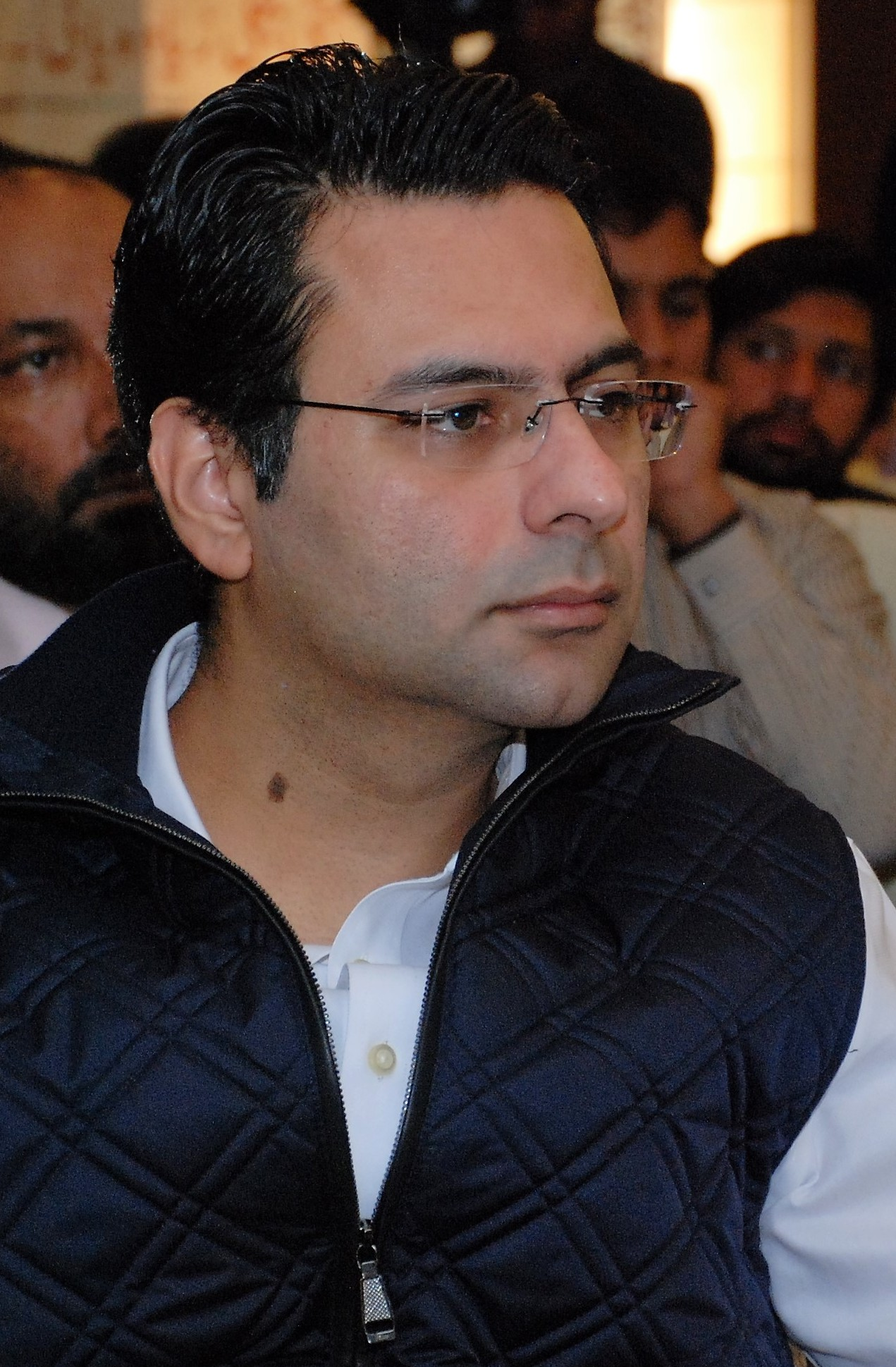
- Elahi in November 2013

Federal Minister for Water Resources
- In office 13 July 2021 – 10 April 2022
- President: Arif Alvi
- Prime Minister: Imran Khan
- Preceded by: Faisal Vawda

Member of the National Assembly of Pakistan
- In office 29 October 2018 – 10 August 2023
- Constituency: NA-69 (Gujrat-II)

Member of the Provincial Assembly of the Punjab
- In office 1 June 2013 – 31 May 2018
- Constituency: PP-110 (Gujrat-III)
- In office 9 April 2008 – 20 March 2013
- Constituency: PP-110 (Gujrat-III)

Personal details
- Born: 12 April 1976 (age 50) Lahore, Punjab, Pakistan
- Party: PTI (2023–present)
- Other political affiliations: PML-Q (2008–2023)
- Spouse: Tehreem Elahi
- Children: 4
- Parent: Pervaiz Elahi (father)
- Relatives: Chaudhry Family
- Education: University of Pennsylvania
- Website: mooniselahi.org

Chaudhry Moonis Elahi (Urdu: چوہدری مونس الٰہی; born 12 April 1976) is a Pakistani politician who served as the Minister for Water Resources from 13 July 2021 till 10 April 2022. He was a member of the National Assembly of Pakistan from October 2018 to August 2023. Previously, he was a member of the Provincial Assembly of the Punjab from 2008 to May 2018.

== Early life and education ==
Elahi was born on 12 April 1976 in Lahore, Punjab, Pakistan. His father, Chaudhry Pervaiz Elahi, served as the Chief Minister of Punjab twice and as the Deputy Prime Minister of Pakistan. His mother is Qaisra Elahi, sister of former Prime Minister Shujaat Hussain.

Moonis studied at the Lahore American School up to 11th grade and later moved to the UK to study at TASIS England American School in Surrey. Later, he attended the Wharton School, where he graduated with a BBA degree in 1999. After completing his education, he returned to Pakistan and joined his family business.

== Political career ==
=== 2007–2023: Pakistan Muslim League (Q) ===
Moonis Elahi began his political career in 2007 when he led a Pakistan Muslim League (Q) (PML (Q)) rally to Islamabad.

In 2008, Moonis ran for the Provincial Assembly of Punjab for the first time as a candidate of the PML (Q) from two constituencies—PP-152 in Lahore and PP-110 in Gujrat—in the 2008 Pakistani general election. He won the Gujrat constituency against Chaudhry Nasir Samma, a candidate of the Pakistan People's Party, but was unsuccessful in the Lahore constituency.

In 2010, Moonis was implicated in the National Insurance Company Limited (NICL) scandal involving Rs 320 million for allegedly involving in real estate deals of NICL land. He initially faced legal challenges for not appearing before the investigation committee and was subsequently detained in March 2011. However, he was acquitted in October 2011 due to lack of conclusive evidence, and by 2012, all related charges were dismissed by the Supreme Court of Pakistan. In 2020, an accountability court acquitted all involved in the NICL scandal, observing that the prosecution had failed to bring on record any evidence.

In 2013, Moonis ran for the Provincial Assembly of Punjab as a candidate of PML (Q) from two constituencies—Mandi Bahauddin and Gujrat—in the 2013 Pakistani general election and was successful in both. He vacated the Mandi Bahauddin seat to retain his native seat in Gujrat.

In 2016, Moonis was named in the Panama Papers. In 2017, the National Accountability Bureau (NAB) initiated a new investigation into Moonis Elahi's wealth; however, in January 2021, the NAB informed the Lahore High Court that the pending inquiries against him and his family members had been closed due to a lack of evidence.

In 2018, Moonis was elected to the National Assembly of Pakistan as a candidate of PML-Q from Constituency NA-69 (Gujrat-II) in by-election held on 14 October. Subsequently, PML (Q) joined the PTI-led coalition after reaching an agreement. By 2019, tensions arose due to delays in fulfilling the terms of coalition agreement. In an effort to address these issues, Moonis became involved and met with then-Prime Minister Imran Khan, who sought PML-Q's continued support for Punjab Chief Minister Sardar Usman Buzdar and resolved the issue.

In July 2021, Moonis was given the portfolio of Federal Minister for Water Resources during Imran Khan's tenure as prime minister. He was sworn in as the federal minister on 19 July. In October 2021, the PTI–PML‑Q coalition government, acting on Moonis Elahi's recommendation, approved PKR 1.3 billion for Phase II of the Gujrat Industrial Estate. Construction began in 2022 after the Punjab Small Industries Corporation (PSIC) acquired 200 acres of land in 2021. In 2023, under the provincial interim set-up the PSIC withdrew the project notification.

=== 2023–present: Pakistan Tehreek-e-Insaf ===
In February 2023, Moonis left PML (Q) and joined the Pakistan Tehreek-e-Insaf (PTI) along with his father Chaudhry Pervaiz Elahi and other PML (Q) members due to political rifts with the president of PML (Q), Chaudhry Shujaat Hussain.

In July 2023, in his absence from the country since December 2022, a murder case was lodged against Moonis Elahi with Mangowal police station, Gujrat. In September 2023, the Mangowal Area Magistrate issued Elahi's arrest warrants and proclamation orders. In 2024, after turning down the first application against these orders the Gujrat District and Sessions Judge deciding on a review application remanded the appeal to the Mangowal Area Magistrate for decision. In January 2025, the Mangowal Area Magistrate cancelled Elahi's arrest warrants and proclamation orders when the complainant and witnesses stated in their written affidavits that Elahi had no connection to the case and they had never accused him.

In March 2024, the Lahore High Court (LHC) permitted Moonis Elahi to participate in the by-elections. This decision followed an earlier ruling by an appellate tribunal of the Lahore High Court, which had denied the nomination papers of PTI leaders for the general elections. He lost the election of PP-158 Lahore-XIV to a PML-N candidate.

In November 2025, due to lack of evidence Interpol rejected the Government of Pakistan's request to extradite Moonis Elahi from Spain and officially closed the case against him. This decision came after two years of multiple Red Notice requests by the Federal Investigation Agency, National Accountability Bureau, Anti-Corruption Establishment, and Punjab Police to Interpol in politically motivated cases filed against Moonis Elahi.

Moonis is the founder of PML Build Kalabagh Dam Movement and advocates for the development of Kalabagh Dam. Moonis is also credited with Chaudhry Pervaiz Elahi for the upgrade of their hometown Gujrat from district to division level status.

== Personal life ==
Moonis Elahi is married to Tehreem Elahi and they have four children together.

== Publications and political views ==
Moonis Elahi has authored several opinion articles published on his official website, where he reflects on socio-political challenges in Pakistan and the Muslim world.

In an article, A Few Questions (2011), exploring the decline of the Muslim world, Elahi raises critical questions about the contradiction between Islamic principles of knowledge and progress and the widespread poverty, extremism, and dependence on foreign aid seen in many Muslim-majority countries. He particularly criticizes Pakistan's historical reliance on international financial assistance, calling it a national mindset that needs to be reformed.

In a separate editorial titled Pakistan for All Pakistanis (2011), Elahi advocates for a pluralistic and inclusive national identity, urging unity across ethnic and linguistic divides. He emphasizes the importance of justice, opportunity, and harmony for all citizens, warning against the dangers of regionalism and political polarization.

In a 2011 article discussing Pakistan's energy and water crisis, Elahi argues for reviving the Kalabagh Dam project, framing it as essential for national survival. He calls for a consensus-driven approach to resolve inter-provincial disagreements and insists that Pakistan's future water security depends on taking politically difficult decisions.

== See also ==
- Parvez Elahi
