= PP-290 Dera Ghazi Khan-V =

Constituency of the Punjabi Provincial Legislature, Pakistan

- Constituency for the Provincial Assembly of Punjab
- Region: Kot Chutta Tehsil (partly) of Dera Ghazi Khan District

Current constituency
- Member: vacant
- Created from: PP-246 Dera Ghazi Khan-VII (2002-2018); PP-287 Dera Ghazi Khan-I (2018-2023)

PP-290 Dera Ghazi Khan-V (پی پی-290، ڈيره غازى خان-5) is a Constituency of Provincial Assembly of Punjab.

== By-election 2024 ==
2024 Pakistani by-elections: PP-290 Dera Ghazi Khan-V
Party	Candidate	Votes	%	±%
PML(N)	Ali Ahmed Khan Leghari	62,529	71.19	▲29.45
SIC	Sardar Muhammad Mohiuddin Khosa	23,672	26.95	▼13.45
Others	Others (five candidates)	1,630	1.86	
Turnout		89,627	46.21	▼7.71
Total valid votes		87,831	98.00	
Rejected ballots		1,796	2.00	
Majority		38,857	44.24	▲42.9
Registered electors		193,960		
PML(N) hold				

== General elections 2024 ==
General election 2024: PP-290 Dera Ghazi Khan-V
Party	Candidate	Votes	%	±%
PML(N)	Awais Leghari	43,133	41.41	
Independent	Sardar Muhammad Mohiuddin Khosa (Note: Filed nomination papers as PTI candidate but ECP allowed him to run as an Independent)	41,906	40.23	
Independent	Mehar Sajjad Hussain Cheena	10,524	10.10	
TLP	Ghulam Fareed	2,540	2.44	
PPP	Munir Ahmad Jalbani Baloch	1,647	1.58	
Saraiki Democratic Party	Ali Raza	1,004	0.96	
Others	Others (seventeen candidates)	3,402	3.28	
Turnout		110,075	56.75	
Total valid votes		103,690	99.57	
Rejected ballots		444	0.43	
Majority		1,385	1.34	
Registered electors		193,960		
hold				

== General elections 2018 ==
Provincial election 2018: PP-291 Dera Ghazi Khan-VII
Party	Candidate	Votes	%	±%
PTI	Sardar Muhammad Mohiudin Khan Khosa	42,161	46.29	
PML(N)	Mehmood Qadir Khan	40,040	43.97	
PPP	Ghulam Sarwar Dummer	2,817	3.09	
TLP	Muhammad Rashid	2,363	2.60	
Independent	Amjad Khan Lashari	1,523	1.67	
Others	Others (five candidates)	2,168	2.37	
Turnout		94,300	58.45	
Total valid votes		91,072	96.58	
Rejected ballots		3,228	3.42	
Majority		2,121	2.32	
Registered electors		161,323		

== General elections 2013 ==
Provincial election 2013: PP-246 Dera Ghazi Khan-VII
Party	Candidate	Votes	%	±%
Independent	Mehmood Qadir Khan	32,105	41.86	
PPP	Major Rtd Malik Muhammad Rashid Kamran Malana	20,889	27.24	
PTI	Shah Nawaz Khan Chandia Advocate	8,674	11.31	
PST	Syed Muhammad Baqir Shah	7,225	9.42	
PML(N)	Ishfaq Ahmad	2,057	2.68	
JUI (F)	Moulana Muhammad Iqbal	1,405	1.83	
JI	Ejaz Ahmad Khan	1,293	1.69	
Others	Others (twelve candidates)	3,042	3.97	
Turnout		79,919	55.20	
Total valid votes		76,690	95.96	
Rejected ballots		3,229	4.04	
Majority		11,216	14.62	
Registered electors		144,793		

== General elections 2008 ==
Contesting candidates	Party affiliation	Votes polled

== See also ==
- PP-289 Dera Ghazi Khan-IV
- PP-291 Dera Ghazi Khan-VI
