= Muhammad Shoaib Siddiqui =

Pakistani politician

Member of the Provincial Assembly of the Punjab
- In office October 2015 – 31 May 2018
- Constituency: PP-147 Lahore-XI

Personal details
- Born: 29 May 1969 (age 57) Lahore, Punjab, Pakistan
- Party: IPP (2023-present)
- Other political affiliations: PMLN (2022-2023); PTI (2012-2022); PML(Q) (2004-2012)

Muhammad Shoaib Siddiqui is a Pakistani politician who was a member of the Provincial Assembly of the Punjab from 2004 to 2007 and again from October 2015 to May 2018.

== Early life and education ==
Siddiqui was born on 29 May 1969 in Lahore. He has an M. Sc. in physics and an M. Sc. in mathematics which he received in 1991 and 1993 respectively from the University of the Punjab.

== Political career ==
He was elected to the Provincial Assembly of the Punjab as a candidate of Pakistan Muslim League (Q) (PML-Q) from Constituency PP-156 (Lahore-XX) in by-polls held in 2004. He served as Parliamentary Secretary for Information from 2006 to 2007.

He ran for the seat of the Provincial Assembly of the Punjab as a candidate of Pakistan Muslim League (Q) from Constituency PP-156 (Lahore-XX) in the 2008 Pakistani general election, but was unsuccessful. He received 6,773 votes and lost the seat to Chaudhry Yaseen Sohail.

He was re-elected to the Provincial Assembly of the Punjab as a candidate of the Pakistan Tehreek-e-Insaf (PTI) from PP-147 (Lahore-XI) in a by-election held in October 2015.
