= Sardar Muhammad Mohiuddin Khosa =

Pakistani politician

Member of the Provincial Assembly of the Punjab
- In office 25 July 2018 – 14 January 2023
- Constituency: PP-291 (Dera Ghazi Khan-VII)

Personal details
- Born: 10 August 1985 (age 41) Lahore, Punjab, Pakistan
- Party: PTI (2018–present)
- Other political affiliations: PPP (2013–2018)
- Relations: Zulfiqar Ali Khosa (grand-father); Dost Muhammad Khosa (Uncle); Latif Khosa (grand-uncle); Amjad Farooq Khan Khosa (Uncle); Muhammad Saif-ud-Din Khosa (Uncle)
- Parent: Hisam-ud-Din Khosa (father)

Sardar Muhammad Mohiuddin Khosa is a Pakistani politician who had been a member of the Provincial Assembly of the Punjab from August 2018 till January 2023.

== Political career ==
He was elected to the Provincial Assembly of the Punjab as a candidate of Pakistan Tehreek-e-Insaf from Constituency PP-291 (Dera Ghazi Khan-VII) in the 2018 Pakistani general election.
