= Jam Mohammad Yousaf =

Pakistani politician (1954–2012)

Jam Mir Mohammad Yousaf Aliani جام مير محمد یوسف عالياني
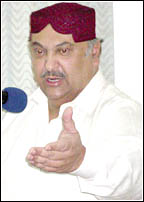

Chief Minister of Balochistan
- In office 1 December 2002 – 19 November 2007
- Preceded by: Jan Mohammad Jamali
- Succeeded by: Aslam Raisani

12th Jam of Lasbela
- Preceded by: Jam Ghulam Qadir Khan
- Succeeded by: Jam Kamal Khan

Personal details
- Born: 14 February 1954 Lasbela, Balochistan, Pakistan
- Died: 16 February 2012 (aged 58) Islamabad, Pakistan
- Party: Pakistan Muslim League (Q) (2001-2012)
- Children: Jam Kamal Khan
- Parent: Jam Ghulam Qadir Khan (father)
- Profession: Jam of Lasbela, Politician, Tumandar of Lasi Tribe

Jam Mir Mohammad Yousaf Aliani (Urdu: جام میر محمد یوسف علیانی, Sindhi: جام مير محمد یوسف عالياني; February 14, 1954 – February 16, 2012) was the 12th Jam of Lasbela, and a former Chief Minister of the Balochistan province of Pakistan.

== Background and family ==
Mir Jam Mohammad Yousaf was born in 1954 at Lasbela, Balochistan. He belonged to the Koreja family of the Samma tribe which once ruled over Sindh.

== Political career ==
Yousaf served as the Chief Minister of Balochistan province from 2002 to 2007. He was the Minister for Water and Power, Railways and a Minister in Balochistan assembly. Previously he held positions as MNA and MPA in the National and Balochistan Provincial Assembly. He was the Provincial President of PML (Q) from 2002.

== Nawab Bugti Murder Case ==
On 7 October 2009, a single bench of the Balochistan High Court (BHC) comprising Chief Justice Qazi Faez Essa accepted an application of Nawabzada Jamil Akbar Bugti, the eldest son of former Balochistan Governor and Chief Minister Nawab Akbar Bugti, alleging that Yousaf, along with former President Pervez Musharraf and former prime minister Shaukat Aziz, was responsible for the killing of his father on 26 August 2006, in a military operation.

BHC ordered the sub-house officer of Dera Bugti to register a first investigation report against Yousaf. On 9 January 2010, the Supreme Court of Pakistan rejected Yousaf's plea against the BHC orders to file a case against him in the Nawab Bugti murder case.

In 2012, Jamil Bugti formally nominated Yousaf in his police report alleging that the former chief minister was responsible for his father's killing. On 17 July 2012, the BHC granted Yousaf interim bail in the case.

== Death ==
Jam Mohammad Yousaf died of cardiac arrest on 16 February 2012 in Islamabad, and was buried in Bara Bagh Cemetery, Lasbela.

== See also ==
- Jam Ghulam Qadir Khan
