= Jam Kamal Khan =

Pakistani politician

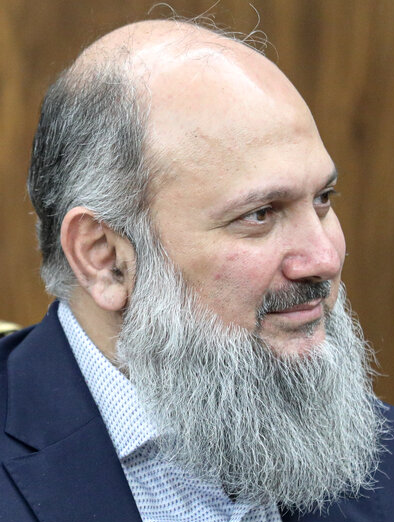
- Khan in 2025

Ministry of Commerce (Pakistan)
- Incumbent
- Assumed office 11 March 2024
- President: Asif Ali Zardari
- Prime Minister: Shehbaz Sharif
- Preceded by: Gohar Ejaz

21st Chief Minister of Balochistan
- In office 19 August 2018 – 24 October 2021
- Governor: Muhammad Khan Achakzai; Amanullah Khan Yasinzai; Syed Zahoor Ahmad Agha
- Preceded by: Alauddin Marri (caretaker)
- Succeeded by: Abdul Quddus Bizenjo

Member of the Provincial Assembly of Balochistan
- In office 13 August 2018 – 12 August 2023
- Constituency: PB-50 (Lasbela-II)

Minister of State for Petroleum
- In office 4 August 2017 – 2 April 2018
- President: Mamnoon Hussain
- Prime Minister: Shahid Khaqan Abbasi

Minister of State for Petroleum & Natural Resources
- In office 7 June 2013 – 28 July 2017
- President: Mamnoon Hussain
- Prime Minister: Nawaz Sharif

Member of the National Assembly of Pakistan
- Incumbent
- Assumed office 29 February 2024
- Constituency: NA-257 Hub-cum-Lasbela-cum-Awaran
- In office 1 June 2013 – 31 May 2018
- Constituency: NA-270 (Awaran-cum-Lasbela)

13th Jam of Lasbela
- Preceded by: Jam Mohammad Yousaf

Personal details
- Born: 1 January 1970 (age 56) Lasbela, Balochistan, Pakistan
- Party: PMLN ( 2023-Present)
- Other political affiliations: BAP (2018–2023); PMLN (2013–2018); PML(Q) (2001–2013)
- Parent: Jam Mohammad Yousaf (father)
- Website: https://jamkamalkhan.pk/

Jam Kamal Khan (Urdu: جام میر کمال خان علیانی; [Baloch [ language|Balochi, ]]: ڄام ڪمال خان علياڻي; born 1 January 1970) is a Pakistani politician who is currently serving as Federal Minister of Commerce since 11 March 2024. He also served as the 16th Chief Minister of Balochistan, between August 2018 and October 2021. He had been a member of the Provincial Assembly of Balochistan from August 2018 till August 2023.

Previously, he was a member of the National Assembly of Pakistan from June 2013 to May 2018 and served as Minister of State for Petroleum and Natural Resources in the cabinet of Prime Minister Nawaz Sharif from 2013 to 2017 and again from August 2017 to March 2018 in the cabinet of Prime Minister Shahid Khaqan Abbasi.

== Personal life and education ==
He was born on 1 January 1970 to Jam Mohammad Yousaf. He is the 13th and current Jam of Lasbela, belonging to the Sindhi Alyani family of the Korejo Jamotes. One of his ancestors, Jam Arradin Korejo, migrated from Sindh and settled in Kanrach during the reign of the Mughal emperor Jahangir (1569–1627).

Jam Kamal holds a degree in marketing from the Greenwich University, Karachi. He is married to an Urdu-speaking woman from Karachi.

== Political career ==
He twice served the District Nazim of the Lasbela District in 2001 and 2005 before he was elected to the National Assembly of Pakistan as an independent candidate from Constituency NA-270 (Awaran-cum-Lasbela) in the 2013 Pakistani general election. He received 56,658 votes and defeated Ghulam Akbar Lasi, a candidate of the Pakistan Peoples Party (PPP). In the same election, he ran for the seat of the Provincial Assembly of Balochistan from Constituency PB-45 (Lasbela-II) as an independent candidate but was unsuccessful. He received 20,169 votes and lost the seat to Mohammad Saleh Bhutani.

In June 2013, he was appointed the Minister of State for Petroleum & Natural Resources in the Cabinet of Prime Minister Nawaz Sharif. He had ceased to hold ministerial office in July 2017 when the federal cabinet was disbanded following the resignation of Prime Minister Nawaz Sharif after the Panama Papers case decision.

Following the election of Shahid Khaqan Abbasi as Prime Minister of Pakistan in August 2017, he was inducted into the federal cabinet of Abbasi. He was appointed the Minister of State for Petroleum, a division under the then newly-created Ministry of Energy.

In April 2018, he resigned from the post of Minister of State for Petroleum. In April 2018, he quit PML-N and helped in creating the Balochistan Awami Party (BAP). In May 2018, he was elected as the first president of the BAP.

He resigned on 1 October 2021 as president of Balochistan Awami Party but later withdrew his decision.

== Chief Minister ==
He was elected to the Provincial Assembly of Balochistan as a candidate of BAP from Constituency PB-50 (Lasbela-II) in the 2018 Pakistani general election. Following his successful election, BAP nominated him for the office of Chief Minister of Balochistan. On 18 August 2018, he was elected Chief Minister of Balochistan. He received 39 votes against his opponent Mir Younus Aziz Zehri who received 20 votes. The same day, he was sworn in as the 16th chief minister of Balochistan.

After assuming the office as the Chief Minister, Khan formed a 10-member cabinet. Of the 10-member cabinet sworn in on 27 August 2018, 9 were provincial ministers and 1 was an advisor. The second part of his cabinet, consisting of 2 provincial ministers was sworn in on 8 September 2018 increasing the size of the cabinet to 12. The same day, he appointed three advisors. On 14 September 2021, opposition parties presented a motion of no confidence against him to the Secretary of the Balochistan Assembly. On 20 October 2021, a motion of no confidence was presented against him in the Provincial Assembly of Balochistan. He resigned as Chief Minister of Balochistan on 24 October 2021.
