= List of senators of Pakistan =

Senate of Pakistan

Type
- Type: Upper house

Leadership
- Chairman of the Senate of Pakistan: Yusuf Raza Gillani, PPP
- Deputy Chairman of the Senate of Pakistan: Syedaal Khan Nasar, PML(N)
- Leader of the House of Federation (Pakistan): Ishaq Dar, PML(N)
- Leader of the Opposition: Raja Nasir Abbas Jafri, MWM
- Seats: 91

Elections
- Last election: March 2021
- Last election: April 2024

Meeting place
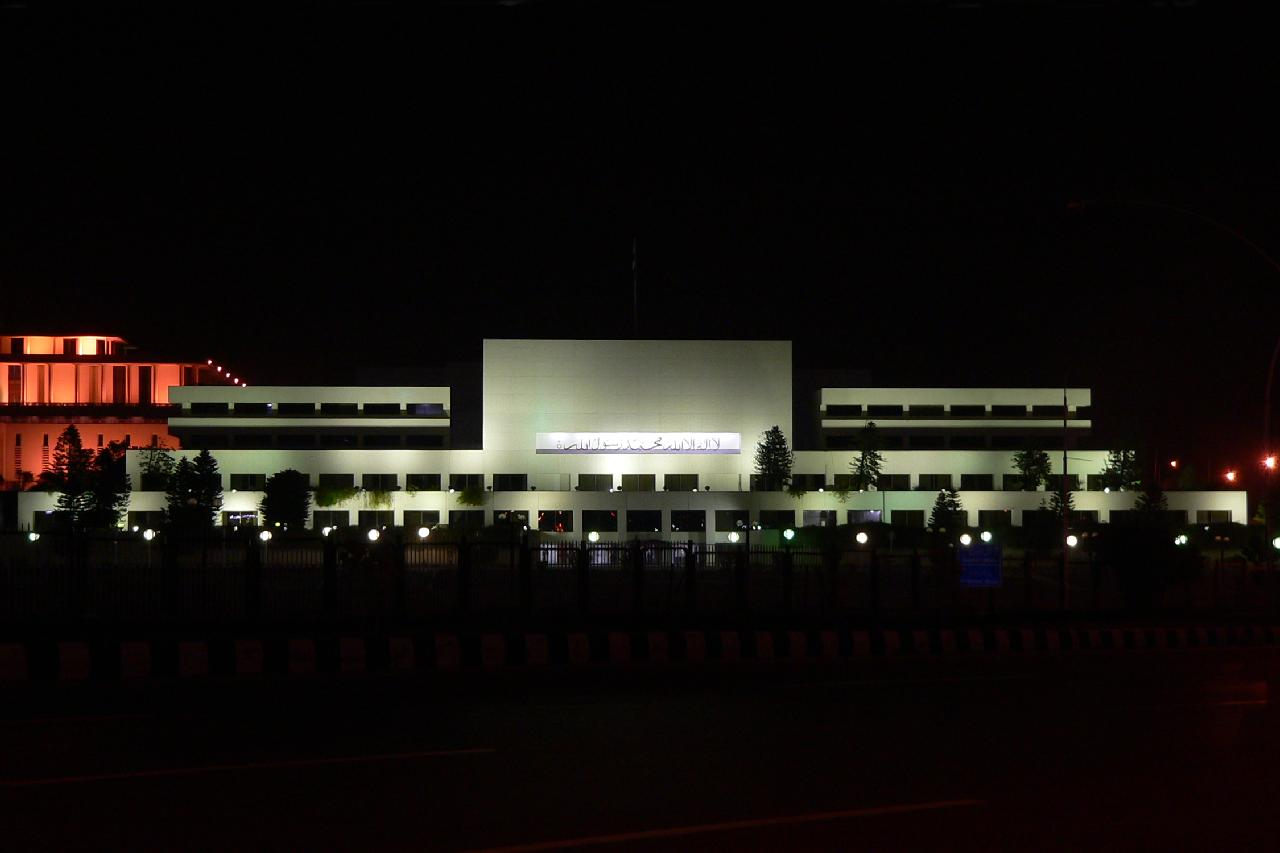
- Parliament of Pakistan

Website
- Official website

The Senate of Pakistan consists of a total of 96 members. The 1970 assembly framed the 1973 Constitution which was passed on 12 April and promulgated on 14 August 1973. The 1973 Constitution provides for a parliamentary form of government with a bicameral legislature, composed of the National Assembly and the Senate. The membership of the Senate, which was originally 45, was raised to 63 in 1977 and to 87 in 1985. The government of Gen. Pervez Musharraf raised the membership of the Senate from 87 to 100 in 2002. In 2018, the number of seats were reduced from 104 to 96 following the merging of FATA with Khyber Pakhtunkhwa through 25th amendment.

== Schedule ==
Senators in Pakistan are elected every three years in March to serve six‑year terms.

== Current party position in Senate ==
The current party position in Senate is as follows:

Party	Term Expires		Total
Party	2027	2030	Total
Pakistan People's Party	9	16	25
Pakistan Tehreek-e-Insaf	15	6	21
Pakistan Muslim League (N)	5	14	19
Jamiat Ulema-e-Islam (F)	3	4	7
Independent	3	3	6
Balochistan Awami Party	4	0	4
Muttahida Qaumi Movement – Pakistan	2	1	3
Awami National Party	1	1	2
Pakistan Muslim League (Q)	1	0	1
National Party	0	1	1
Majlis Wahdat-e-Muslimeen	0	1	1
Sunni Ittehad Council	0	1	1
Total	43	48	91

== List of senators by term ==
=== 2024–2030 (current) ===
Name	Party	Constituency	Term Expires	Seat Type
Amir Chishti	Muttahida Qaumi Movement – Pakistan	Sindh	March/April 2030	General
Abdul Wasey	Jamiat Ulema-e-Islam (F)	Balochistan	March/April 2030	Technocrats
Agha Shahzaib Durrani	Pakistan Muslim League (N)	Balochistan	March/April 2030	General
Ahad Cheema	Pakistan Muslim League (N)	Punjab	March/April 2030	General
Ahmed Khan Andarh Khilji	Pakistan Muslim League (N)	Balochistan	March/April 2030	General
Aimal Wali Khan	Awami National Party	Balochistan	March/April 2030	General
Anwaar ul Haq Kakar	Pakistan Tehreek-e-Insaf	Balochistan	March/April 2030	General
Anusha Rahman	Pakistan Muslim League (N)	Punjab	March/April 2030	Women
Ashraf Ali Jatoi	Pakistan People's Party	Sindh	March/April 2030	General
Atta ul Haq Darvish	Jamiat Ulema-e-Islam (F)	Khyber Pakhtunkhwa	March/April 2030 (Note: Elected in July 2025)	General
Azam Swati	Pakistan Tehreek-e-Insaf	Khyber Pakhtunkhwa	March/April 2030	Technocrats
Bilal Khan Mandokhail	Pakistan People's Party	Balochistan	March/April 2030	Technocrats
Bushra Anjum Butt	Pakistan Muslim League (N)	Punjab	March/April 2030	Women
Dilawar Khan	Jamiat Ulema-e-Islam (F)	Khyber Pakhtunkhwa	March/April 2030	Technocrats
Dost Ali Jessar	Pakistan People's Party	Sindh	March/April 2030	General
Faisal Javed	Pakistan Tehreek-e-Insaf	Khyber Pakhtunkhwa	March/April 2030	General
Faisal Vawda	Independent	Sindh	March/April 2030	General
Hamid Khan	Pakistan Tehreek-e-Insaf	Punjab	March/April 2030	General
Hasna Bano	Pakistan People's Party	Balochistan	March/April 2030	Women
Ishaq Dar	Pakistan Muslim League (N)	Islamabad	March/April 2030	Technocrats
Jan Muhammad Buledi	National Party (Pakistan)	Balochistan	March/April 2030	General
Khalil Tahir Sandhu	Pakistan Muslim League (N)	Punjab	March/April 2030	Minorities
Mirza Muhammad Afridi	Pakistan Tehreek-e-Insaf	Khyber Pakhtunkhwa	March/April 2030	General
Mohsin Naqvi	Independent	Punjab	March/April 2030	General
Muhammad Aurangzeb	Pakistan Muslim League (N)	Punjab	March/April 2030	Technocrats
Murad Saeed	Pakistan Tehreek-e-Insaf	Khyber Pakhtunkhwa	March/April 2030	General
Musadik Malik	Pakistan Muslim League (N)	Punjab	March/April 2030	Technocrats
Nadeem Ahmed Bhutto	Pakistan People's Party	Sindh	March/April 2030	General
Nasir Butt	Pakistan Muslim League (N)	Punjab	March/April 2030	General
Niaz Amir Muqam	Pakistan Muslim League (N)	Khyber Pakhtunkhwa	March/April 2030	General
Noor-ul-Haq Qadri	Pakistan Tehreek-e-Insaf	Khyber Pakhtunkhwa	March/April 2030	General
Pervaiz Rashid	Pakistan Muslim League (N)	Punjab	March/April 2030	General
Poonjo Mal Bheel	Pakistan People's Party	Sindh	March/April 2030	Minorities
Quratulain Marri	Pakistan People's Party	Sindh	March/April 2030	Women
Rahat Jamali	Balochistan Awami Party	Balochistan	March/April 2030	Women
Raja Nasir Abbas Jafri	Majlis Wahdat-e-Muslimeen	Punjab	March/April 2030	General
Rana Mahmood-ul-Hassan	Pakistan People's Party	Islamabad	March/April 2030	General
Rubina Khalid	Pakistan People's Party	Khyber Pakhtunkhwa	March/April 2030	Women
Rubina Naz	Pakistan Tehreek-e-Insaf	Khyber Pakhtunkhwa	March/April 2030	Women
Rubina Qaimkhani	Pakistan People's Party	Sindh	March/April 2030	Women
Sardar Umar Gorgaij	Pakistan People's Party	Balochistan	March/April 2030	General
Sarmad Ali	Pakistan People's Party	Sindh	March/April 2030	Technocrats
Syedaal Khan Nasar	Pakistan Muslim League (N)	Balochistan	March/April 2030	General
Syed Kazim Ali Shah	Pakistan People's Party	Sindh	March/April 2030	General
Syed Masroor Ahsan	Pakistan People's Party	Sindh	March/April 2030	General
Talal Chaudhry	Pakistan Muslim League (N)	Punjab	March/April 2030	General
Talha Mahmood	Pakistan People's Party	Khyber Pakhtunkhwa	March/April 2030	General
Zamir Hussain Ghumro	Pakistan People's Party	Sindh	March/April 2030	Technocrats

=== 2021–2027 (current) ===
Name	Party	Constituency	Term Expires	Seat Type
Abdul Ghafoor Haideri	Jamiat Ulema-e-Islam (F)	Balochistan	March 2027	General
Afnan Ullah Khan	Pakistan Muslim League (N)	Punjab	March 2027	General
Abdul Quddus Bizenjo	Pakistan People's Party	Balochistan	March 2027	General
Aon Abbas	Pakistan Tehreek-e-Insaf	Punjab	March 2027	General
Arbab Umar Farooq	Awami National Party	Balochistan	March 2027	General
Asad Qasim	Independent	Balochistan	March 2027 (Note: Replaced Qasim Roonjho in March 2025)	General
Atta-ur-Rehman	Jamiat Ulema-e-Islam (F)	KPK	March 2027	General
Azam Nazeer Tarar	Pakistan Muslim League (N)	Punjab	March 2027	Technocrats
Danesh Kumar	Balochistan Awami Party	Balochistan	March 2027	Minorities
Dost Muhammad Khan	Pakistan Tehreek-e-Insaf	KPK	March 2027	Technocrats/Ulema
Faisal Saleem Rahman	Pakistan Tehreek-e-Insaf	KPK	March 2027	General
Faisal Subzwari	Muttahida Qaumi Movement – Pakistan	Sindh	March 2027	General
Falak Naz	Pakistan Tehreek-e-Insaf	KPK	March 2027	Women
Farooq Naek	Pakistan People's Party	Sindh	March 2027	Technocrats
Fawzia Arshad	Pakistan Tehreek-e-Insaf	Federal Area	March 2027	Women
Gurdeep Singh	Pakistan Tehreek-e-Insaf	KPK	March 2027	Minorities
Hafiz Abdul Kareem	Pakistan Muslim League (N)	Punjab	March 2027 (Note: Replaced Sajid Mir in July 2025)	General
Humayun Mohmand	Pakistan Tehreek-e-Insaf	KPK	March 2027	Technocrats
Irfan Siddiqui	Pakistan Muslim League (N)	Punjab	March 2027	General
Jam Mehtab Hussain Dahar	Pakistan People's Party	Sindh	March 2027	General
Kamil Ali Agha	Pakistan Muslim League (Q)	Punjab	March 2027	General
Kamran Murtaza	Jamiat Ulema-e-Islam (F)	Balochistan	March 2027	Technocrats
Khalida Ateeb	Muttahida Qaumi Movement – Pakistan	Sindh	March 2027	Women
Liaqat Khan Tarakai	Pakistan Tehreek-e-Insaf	KPK	March 2027	General
Manzoor Ahmed Kakar	Balochistan Awami Party	Balochistan	March 2027	General
Mohammad Abdul Qadir	Independent	Balochistan	March 2027	General
Mohsin Aziz	Pakistan Tehreek-e-Insaf	KPK	March 2027	General
Naseema Ehsan	Independent (Note: Elected on the platform of the Balochistan National Party (Mengal), expelled from the party in October 2024.)	Balochistan	March 2027	Women
Nisar Khuhro	Pakistan People's Party	Sindh	March 2027	General
Palwasha Khan	Pakistan People's Party	Sindh	March 2027	Women
Sadia Abbasi	Pakistan Muslim League (N)	Punjab	March 2027	Women
Saeed Ahmed Hashmi	Balochistan Awami Party	Balochistan	March 2027	Technocrats
Saifullah Abro	Pakistan Tehreek-e-Insaf	Sindh	March 2027	Technocrats
Saifullah Niazi	Pakistan Tehreek-e-Insaf	Punjab	March 2027	General
Saleem Mandviwalla	Pakistan People's Party	Sindh	March 2027	General
Samina Mumtaz Zehri	Balochistan Awami Party	Balochistan	March 2027	Women
Shahadat Awan	Pakistan People's Party	Sindh	March 2027	General
Sherry Rehman	Pakistan People's Party	Sindh	March 2027	General
Shibli Faraz	Pakistan Tehreek-e-Insaf	KPK	March 2027	General
Syed Ali Zafar	Pakistan Tehreek-e-Insaf	Punjab	March 2027	Technocrats/Ulema
Yusuf Raza Gilani	Pakistan People's Party	Federal Area	March 2027	General
Zarqa Taimur	Pakistan Tehreek-e-Insaf	Punjab	March 2027	Women
Zeeshan Khanzada	Pakistan Tehreek-e-Insaf	KPK	March 2027	General

==== Former members ====
Name	Party	Constituency	Term end date	Seat Type
Ejaz Chaudhary	Pakistan Tehreek-e-Insaf	Punjab	July 2025	General
Hidayat Ullah Khan	Awami National Party	KPK	July 2024	General
Qasim Roonjho	Balochistan National Party (M)	Balochistan	October 2024	General
Sajid Mir	Pakistan Muslim League (N)	Punjab	May 2025	General
Sania Nishtar	Pakistan Tehreek-e-Insaf	KPK	October 2024	Women
Taj Haider	Pakistan People's Party	Sindh	April 2025	General

=== 2018–2024 ===
Name	Party	Constituency	Seat Type
Abida Muhammad Azeem	Independent	Balochistan	Women
Ahmed Khan Andarh Khilji	Independent	Balochistan	General
Anwar Lal Dean	Pakistan People's Party	Sindh	Minorities
Asad Junejo	Independent	Federal Area	General
Asif Kirmani	Independent	Punjab	General
Azam Khan Swati	Pakistan Tehreek-e-Insaf	KPK	General
Bahramand Tangi	Pakistan People's Party	KPK	General
Dilawar Khan	Independent	KPK	Technocrats/Ulema
Faisal Javed Khan	Pakistan Tehreek-e-Insaf	KPK	General
Farogh Naseem	Muttahida Qaumi Movement – Pakistan	Sindh	General
Fida Mohammad	Pakistan Tehreek-e-Insaf	KPK	General
Hafiz Abdul Kareem	Independent	Punjab	Technocrats/Ulema
Hilal-ur-Rehman	Independent	FATA	General
Hidayat Ullah	Independent	FATA	General
Imamuddin Shouqeen	Pakistan People's Party	Sindh	General
Ishaq Dar	Independent	Punjab	Technocrats
Kamran Michael	Independent	Punjab	Minorities
Khalida Sikandar Mandhro	Pakistan People's Party	Sindh	Technocrats
Kauda Babar	Independent	Balochistan	General
Krishna Kohli	Pakistan People's Party	Sindh	Women
Maula Bakhsh Chandio	Pakistan People's Party	Sindh	General
Meher Taj Roghani	Pakistan Tehreek-e-Insaf	KPK	Women
Mirza Muhammad Afridi	Independent	FATA	General
Molvi Faiz Muhammad	Jamiat Ulema-e-Islam (F)	Balochistan	General
Mushahid Hussain Syed	Independent	Federal Area	Technocrats/Ulema
Musadik Malik	Independent	Punjab	General
Mushtaq Ahmad Khan	Jamaat-e-Islami	KPK	General
Muhammad Akram	National Party	Balochistan	General
Muhammad Talha Mahmood	Jamiat Ulema-e-Islam (F)	KPK	General
Muzaffar Hussain Shah	Pakistan Muslim League (F)	Sindh	General
Naseebullah Bazai	Independent	Balochistan	Technocrats
Nuzhat Sadiq	Independent	Punjab	Women
Pir Sabir Shah	Independent	KPK	General
Prince Ahmed Umer Ahmedzai	Balochistan Awami Party	Balochistan	General
Quratulain Marri	Pakistan People's Party	Sindh	Women
Rana Mahmood-ul-Hassan	Independent	Punjab	General
Raza Rabbani	Pakistan People's Party	Sindh	General
Rubina Khalid	Pakistan People's Party	KPK	Women
Rukhsana Zuberi	Pakistan People's Party	Sindh	Technocrats
Sadiq Sanjrani	Independent	Balochistan	General
Sana Jamali	Independent	Balochistan	Women
Sardar Muhammad Shafiq Tareen	Pashtunkhwa Milli Awami Party	Balochistan	General
Sarfaraz Bugti	Balochistan Awami Party	Balochistan	General
Seemi Aizdi	Pakistan Tehreek-e-Insaf	Punjab	Women
Shahzad Waseem	Pakistan Tehreek-e-Insaf	Punjab	General
Shammim Afridi	Independent	FATA	General
Shaheen Khalid Butt	Independent	Punjab	General
Syed Muhammad Ali Shah Jamot	Pakistan People's Party	Sindh	General
Tahir Bizenjo	National Party	Balochistan	General
Walid Iqbal	Pakistan Tehreek-e-Insaf	Punjab	General
Waqar Mehdi	Pakistan People's Party	Sindh	General

== Bibliography ==
- Kronstadt, K. Alan (24 September 2024). Pakistan's Domestic Political Setting (In Focus). Congressional Research Service.
- Wasim, Amir (24 May 2018). "National Assembly green-lights Fata-KP merger by passing 'historic' bill". Dawn.
