= 2024 Pakistani Senate election =

- 2 April 2024

37 out of 96 seats in the Senate of Pakistan 49 seats needed for a majority
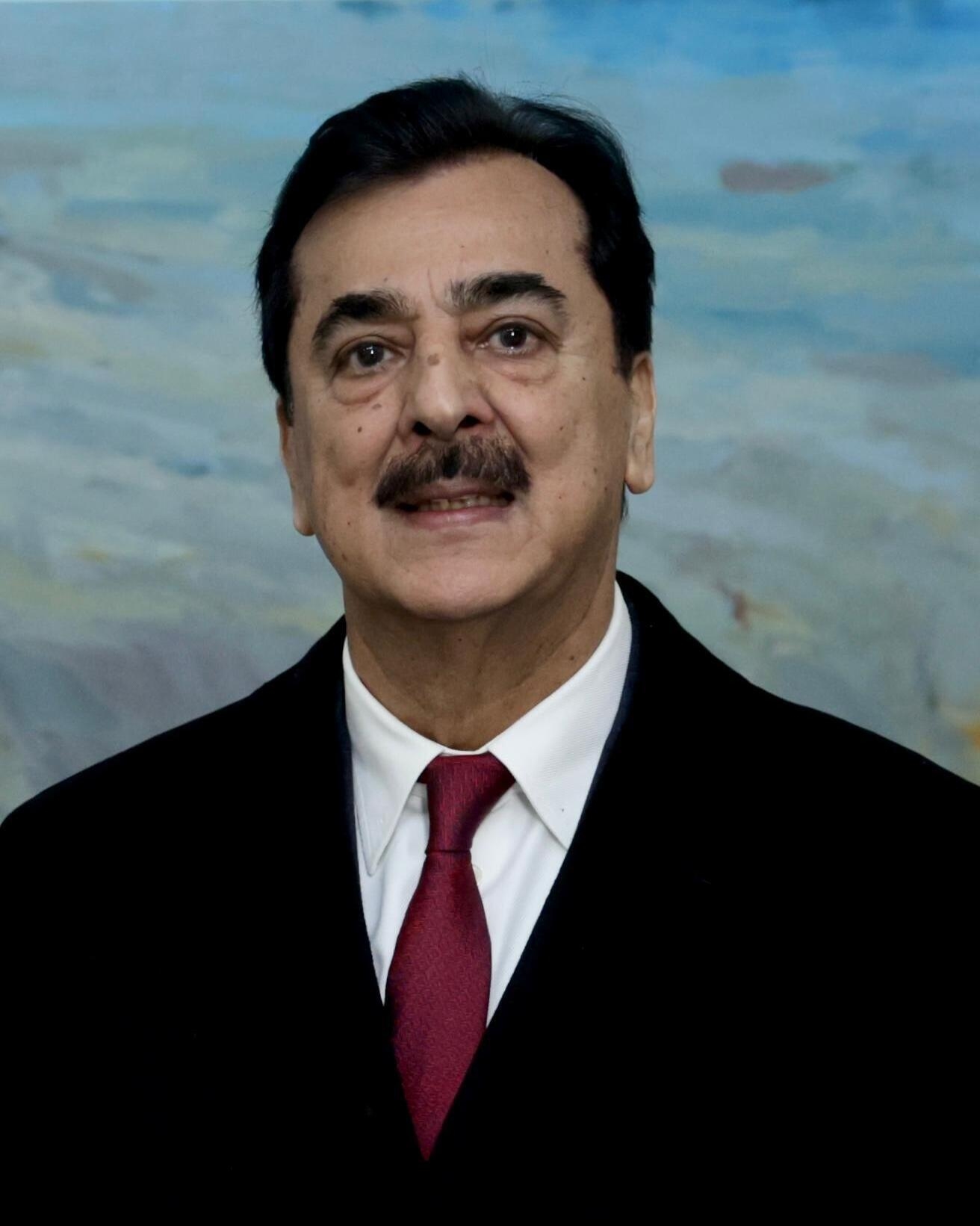

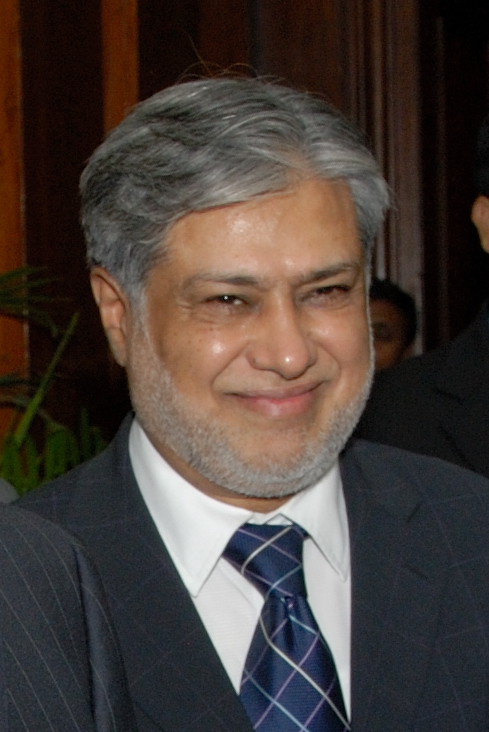
	First party	Second party	Third party
Leader	Yusuf Raza Gilani	Ishaq Dar	Syed Ali Zafar
Party	PPP	PML(N)	IND small (backed by (PTI)
Leader since	2021	2022	2021
Leader's seat	General Islamabad	Technocrat Islamabad	Technocrat Punjab
Last election	21	17	27
Seats won	24	19	17
Seat change	▲3	▲2	▼10
- Map of Pakistan showing Senate seats.
Chair before election
Sadiq Sanjrani
BAP
Elected chair
Yusuf Raza Gilani
PPP

Elections for the Senate of Pakistan were held on 2 April 2024. Senate elections in Khyber Pakhtunkhwa were postponed by the ECP to 21 July 2025.

52 out of 100 incumbent Senators including 4 FATA senators retired after completing their 6-year terms. After the merger of FATA with Khyber Pakhtunkhwa, the remaining 4 out of 8 seats were also abolished. 48 seats from four Provinces and the Federal Capital were up for election, including the seats for which the election was postponed.

== Background ==
The previous Senate elections on these seats were held on 3 March 2018. As a result of these elections, Pakistan Tehreek-e-Insaf (PTI) became the largest party in the Senate as it won the most seats, securing 18 of the 48 senate seats up for election; of which 10 came from Khyber Pakhtunkhwa, 5 from Punjab, 2 from Sindh, and one from Islamabad. The Pakistan Peoples Party (PPP) came in second by winning 8 seats, of which 7 were won in Sindh and one in Islamabad. The Balochistan Awami Party (BAP) was declared victorious on 6 seats – all from Balochistan. Finally, the Pakistan Muslim League (N) lost its majority in the Senate as it could only manage 5 seats from Punjab against 16 retiring senators.

After the results were declared, much of the focus was on the Islamabad General seat won by PPP's Yousaf Raza Gillani where he beat PTI's incumbent finance minister, Abdul Hafeez Shaikh, by a margin of 5 votes. Although, Gillani was the opposition's joint candidate, he still did not have the required majority unless those on the treasury benches voted for him or intentionally voided their votes in the secret ballot. This fact, coupled with the leaked video of his son, led to PTI petitioning the Election Commission of Pakistan against his victory.

Meanwhile Gurdeep Singh of the PTI became the first Sikh to be elected to the Senate of Pakistan as he won the minority seat from Khyber Pakhtunkhwa.

Abdul Qadir, who had won as an independent from Balochistan, later joined the PTI, increasing the tally of the party to 26 in the Senate.

== Results ==
=== Results by administrative unit ===
Below are the results by administrative unit. Elections in Khyber Pakhtunkhwa were postponed due to the refusal of the Speaker of its Provincial Assembly to administer oaths to opposition members elected on reserved seats, which he claimed to belong to the PTI.

Punjab
Seat Type	Winners						
General	Ahad Cheema (PMLN)	Nasir Butt (PMLN)	Pervaiz Rasheed (PMLN)	Talal Chaudhry (PMLN)	Hamid Khan (PTI)	Raja Nasir Abbas Jafri (MWM)	Mohsin Naqvi (IND)
Technocrat	Muhammad Aurangzeb (PMLN)			Musadik Malik (PMLN)			
Women	Anusha Rahman (PMLN)				Bushra Anjum Butt (PMLN)		
Minority	Khalil Tahir Sandhu (PMLN)						

Sindh
Seat Type	Winners						
General	Ashraf Ali Jatoi (PPP)	Dost Ali Jessar (PPP)	Nadeem Ahmed Bhutto (PPP)	Syed Kazim Ali Shah (PPP)	Syed Masroor Ahsan (PPP)	Aamir Chishti (MQM–P)	Faisal Vawda (IND)
Technocrat	Sarmad Ali (PPP)			Zamir Hussain Ghumro (PPP)			
Women	Quratulain Marri (PPP)				Rubina Qaimkhani (PPP)		
Minority	Poonjo Mal Bheel (PPP)						

Balochistan
Seat Type	Winners						
General	Agha Shahzaib Durrani (PMLN)	Syedaal Khan Nasar (PMLN)	Sardar Umar Gorgaij (PPP)	Ahmed Khan Andarh Khilji (JUI (F)	Jan Muhammad Buledi (NP)	Aimal Wali Khan (ANP)	Anwaar ul Haq Kakar (IND)
Technocrat	Bilal Khan Mandokhail (PPP)			Abdul Wasey (JUI (F))			
Women	Rahat Jamali (PMLN)				Hasna Bano (PPP)		

ICT
Seat Type	Winners
General	Rana Mahmood-ul-Hassan (PPP)
Technocrat	Ishaq Dar (PMLN)

== Aftermath ==
On 9 April 2024 Yusuf Raza Gilani of the Pakistan People's Party (PPP) and Syedaal Khan Nasar of the Pakistan Muslim League (N) (PML(N)), both being candidates of the treasury benches, were elected unopposed to the Chairman and Deputy chairman positions respectively. They replaced Sadiq Sanjrani of the Balochistan Awami Party (BAP) and Mirza Muhammad Afridi of the Pakistan Tehreek-e-Insaf (PTI). The opposition PTI boycotted the election, arguing for its postponement until after Senate elections were held in Khyber Pakhtunkhwa.

On the same day Ishaq Dar of the PML(N) was appointed as Leader of the House in the Senate, a position he has held since 30 September 2022. On 22 April, Shibli Faraz of the PTI was appointed as the Leader of the Opposition in the Senate, replacing Shahzad Waseem, also of the PTI.
