= Pakistan Institute for Parliamentary Services =

Pakistani governmental institution

Pakistan Institute for Parliamentary Services (PIPS)
- ادارہَ پارلیمانی خدمات ، پاکستان; Parliament of Pakistan
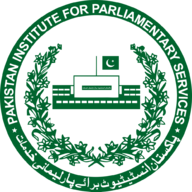

Agency overview
- Formed: 15 December 2008
- Headquarters: Islamabad, Islamabad Capital Territory
- Minister responsible: Speaker National Assembly of Pakistan
- Agency executive: Mr. Asim Khan Goraya, Executive Director of PIPS
- Website: www.pips.gov.pk

Pakistan Institute for Parliamentary Services (PIPS) (Urdu: ادارہَ پارلیمانی خدمات ، پاکستان) was established in December 2008 by the Parliament of Pakistan and is located in Islamabad. In May 2012, Under Secretary of State for Public Diplomacy and Public Affairs Tara Sonenshine joined U.S. Ambassador Cameron Munter and National Assembly Speaker Dr. Fahmida Mirza, in Islamabad, to celebrate the opening of the Pakistan Institute for Parliamentary Service (PIPS).

The Institute helps and trains the members of the Pakistani parliament and their staff in drafting bills and motions to be introduced in the Parliament of Pakistan. This institute was formed since many newly elected members of the parliament and their staff needed training in the Parliamentary procedures. The institute provides legislative research and for effective strong legislature in Pakistan.

== Establishment ==
The Pakistan Institute for Parliamentary Services (PIPS) was established through an Act of Parliament on 15 December 2008 as a parliamentary research and capacity-building institution. It had begun functioning from an interim facility in April 2006 before its formal establishment.

== Board of Governors ==
No.	Name	Position/Designation	Role
01	Syed Yousaf Raza Gilani	Chairman, Senate of Pakistan	President
02	Syed Ghulam Mustafa Shah	Deputy Speaker, National Assembly of Pakistan	Vice-President
03	Azam Nazeer Tarar	Minister for Parliamentary Affairs	Member
04	Malik Muhammad Ahmad Khan	Speaker, Provincial Assembly of Punjab	Member
05	Awais Qadir Shah	Speaker, Provincial Assembly of Sindh	Member
06	Babar Saleem Swati	Speaker, Provincial Assembly of Khyber Pakhtunkhwa	Member
07	Abdul Khaliq Khan	Speaker, Provincial Assembly of Balochistan	Member
08	Senator Shahzaib Durrani	Member, Senate of Pakistan	Member
09	Senator Ashraf Ali Jatoi	Member, Senate of Pakistan	Member
10	Senator Syed Ali Zafar	Member, Senate of Pakistan	Member
11	Senator Atta-ur-Rehman	Member, Senate of Pakistan	Member
12	Maulana Abdul Ghafoor Haideri	Member, National Assembly of Pakistan	Member
13	Bilal Azhar Kayani	Member, National Assembly of Pakistan	Member
14	Wajiha Qamar	Member, National Assembly of Pakistan	Member
15	Ali Pervaiz Malik	Member, National Assembly of Pakistan	Member
16	Khursheed Ahmed Junejo	Member, National Assembly of Pakistan	Member
17	Mahtab Akbar Rashdi	Member, National Assembly of Pakistan	Member
18	Zartaj Gul	Member, National Assembly of Pakistan	Member
19	Syed Amin-ul-Haque	Member, National Assembly of Pakistan	Member
20	Syed Hasnain Haider	Secretary, Senate of Pakistan	Ex-Officio Member
21	Tahir Hussain	Secretary General, National Assembly of Pakistan	Ex-Officio Member
22	Asim Khan Goraya	Executive Director of the Institute	Ex-Officio Member
