= 2025 Pakistani Senate election in Khyber Pakhtunkhwa =

- 21 July 2025

11 out of 96 seats in the Senate of Pakistan
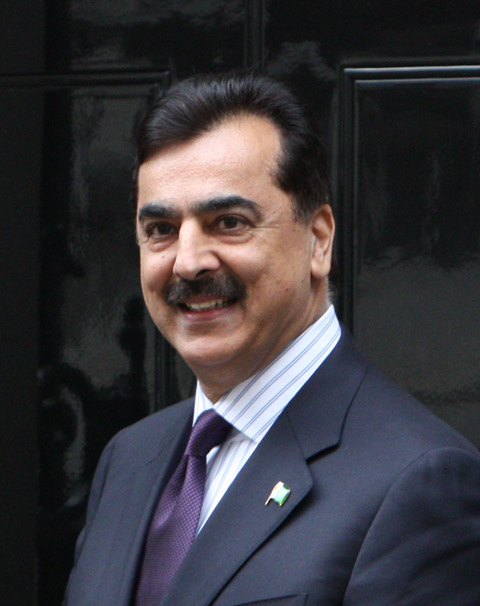

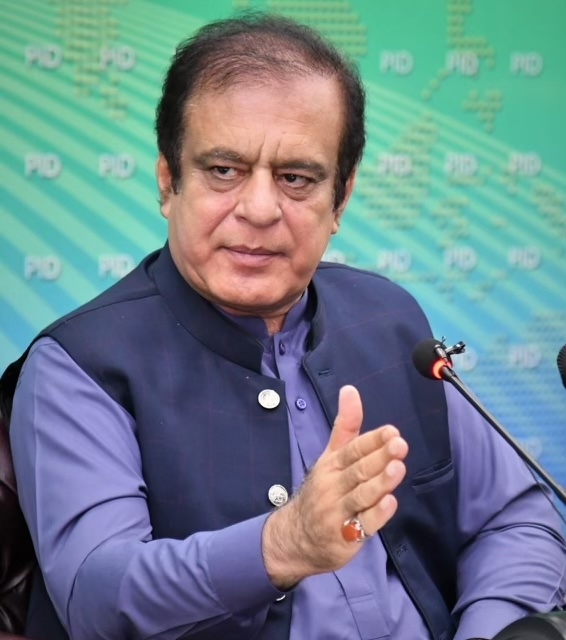

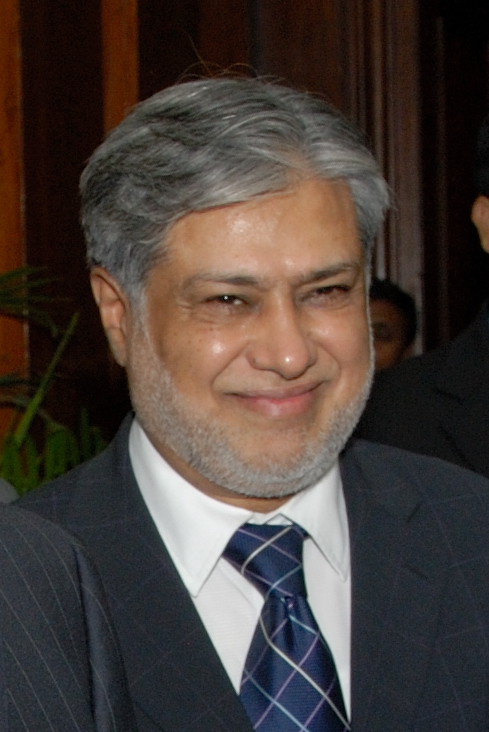
	First party	Second party	Third party
Leader	Yusuf Raza Gilani	Shibli Faraz	Ishaq Dar
Party	PPP	IND (backed by PTI)	PML(N)
Leader since	2021	2024	2022
Leader's seat	General Islamabad	General KPK	Technocrat Islamabad
Last election	24	17	19
Seats won	26	23	20
Seat change	▲2	▲6	▲1

Elections for 11 seats of the Senate of Pakistan were held on 21 July 2025. These seats, all of which were from Khyber Pakhtunkhwa, were supposed to be up for election in 2024, but due to the incomplete membership of the Provincial Assembly of Khyber Pakhtunkhwa, had to be postponed. After the appeal to the Reserved seats case was accepted, and the membership of the Provincial Assembly became complete, the Election Commission of Pakistan (ECP) set the polling date for 21 July 2025.

Independents supported by the Pakistan Tehreek-e-Insaf (PTI) won 6 of the 11 seats, while the Jamiat Ulema-e-Islam (F) (JUI-F) and Pakistan People's Party (PPP) won two seats each. The Pakistan Muslim League (N) (PML(N)) also won a seat.

== Background ==
The previous Senate elections were held on 2 April 2024. These 11 seats were up for election, but their elections had to be postponed until the membership of the Provincial Assembly of Khyber Pakhtunkhwa was complete.

As a result of the PTI intra-party elections case, PTI candidates had to contest the 2024 Khyber Pakhtunkhwa provincial election as independents. After their election, most PTI-affiliated MPAs join the Sunni Ittehad Council (SIC), so they could be eligible for reserved seats. The ECP, however, notified members from other parties on those seats, arguing that the SIC never contested the elections nor had given a list of candidates for the reserved seats. The Speaker of the Provincial Assembly of Khyber Pakhtunkhwa, Babar Saleem Swati, refused to administer the oath to these members until the Reserved seats case was settled.

On 12 July 2024, the Supreme Court of Pakistan (SCP) overturned a previous decision by the Peshawar High Court, and declared the ECP's decision "null and void". The majority verdict of the 13-member bench also allowed the PTI to become eligible for reserved seats.

However, on 26 March 2025, the constitutional bench of the SCP heard review petitions filed be the ECP, PML(N), and PPP, and ruled that the PTI/SIC was ineligible for reserved seats. As a result, the ECP decision was upheld.

On 4 July, the ECP announced the schedule for the elections, and the members of the Provincial Assembly, who were elected to these reserved seats, took oath on 20 July 2025.

== Results ==
The following table lists the elected senators.

Khyber Pakhtunkhwa
Seat Type	Winners						
General	Faisal Javed (PTI)	Mirza Muhammad Afridi (PTI)	Murad Saeed (PTI)	Noor-ul-Haq Qadri (PTI)	Atta ul Haq Darvish (JUI(F))	Niaz Amir Muqam (PML(N))	Talha Mahmood (PPP)
Technocrat	Azam Swati (PTI)			Dilawar Khan (JUI (F))			
Women	Rubina Naz (PTI)				Rubina Khalid (PPP)		
