= Sabir Ali Baloch =

Pakistani politician

Sabir Ali Baloch (Urdu: صابر علی بلوچ) was the Deputy Chairman of the Senate of Pakistan from 12 March 2012 to 12 March 2015, serving in the Senate from March 2009 to March 2015. He is the member of Pakistan Peoples Party and had been three times Member of the Provincial Assembly of Balochistan. He was appointed Deputy Chairman of Senate by President Asif Ali Zardari, votes were held on 12 March 2012.

== See also ==
- List of Senators of Pakistan

Political offices
Preceded by Jan Mohammad Jamali	Deputy Chairman of the Senate; 2012–2015	Succeeded by Abdul Ghafoor Haideri
