= Shahadat Awan =

Pakistani politician & Advocate

Senate of Pakistan
- Incumbent
- Assumed office March 2021
- Constituency: Sindh

Personal details
- Party: PPP (2021-present)

Malik Shahadat Awan (Urdu: ملک شہادت اعوان) is a Pakistani politician who is currently serving as a member of the Senate of Pakistan from the Sindh since March 2021. He is also member of Pakistan Bar Council since 2021. He belongs to Pakistan Peoples Party Parliamentarians.
