= Electoral history of Shehbaz Sharif =

Elections featuring Prime Minister of Pakistan

This is a summary of the electoral history of Shehbaz Sharif, who has served as Prime Minister of Pakistan since 2024, previously served as prime minister from 2022 to 2023, and served three times as Chief Minister of Punjab. He has been elected to the Provincial Assembly of the Punjab from Lahore, Bhakkar and Rajanpur, and to the National Assembly of Pakistan from Lahore and Kasur. He has also contested National Assembly constituencies in Swat, Dera Ghazi Khan and Karachi.

== National Assembly elections ==
=== 1990 general election, NA-96 Lahore V ===
Party	Candidate	Votes
IJI	Mian Muhammad Shahbaz Sharif	54,506
PDA	Jahangir Badar	41,902
JUP-N	Abdul Sattar Ghazi	368
JUI-F	Maulana Saifuddin	317
Independent	Agha Muhammad Saleh	301
Independent	Khalid Hussain Butt	179
Independent	Syed Ejaz Hussain Shah	176
Independent	Hafiz Salman Butt	152
Independent	Abdul Hameed Khan	91
Independent	Malik Muhammad Akhtar	58

=== 1993 general election, NA-96 Lahore V ===
Party	Candidate	Votes
PML-N	Mian Muhammad Shahbaz Sharif	55,867
PPP	Mian Yousaf Salah Ud Din	37,858
PIF	Ijaz Ahmad Chaudhary	1,321
Independent	Khawaja Falah ud Din	375
Independent	Zafar Ullah Khan	139
Independent	Malik Javaid Hassan	123

=== 1997 general election, NA-96 Lahore V ===
Party	Candidate	Votes
PML-N	Mian Muhammad Shahbaz Sharif	47,614
PPP	Muhammad Hanif Ramay	10,410
PTI	Khawaja Shabahuddin	2,125
WP	Zafar Ullah Khan	168
KT	Doctor Abdul Qayyum Khan	168

=== 2013 general election, NA-129 Lahore XII ===
Party	Candidate	Votes
PML-N	Mian Muhammad Shehbaz Sharif	94,007
PTI	Muhammad Mansha	35,781
PPP-P	Tariq Shabir	11,633
JUI-F	Muhammad Liaqat	1,203

=== 2018 general election, NA-3 Swat II ===
Party	Candidate	Votes
PTI	Saleem Rahman	68,280
PML-N	Mian Muhammad Shahbaz Sharif	22,758
PPP	Sharyar Ameerzeb	22,051
ANP	Abdul Kareem	21,910
Independent	Hujjat Ullah	16,844

=== 2018 general election, NA-132 Lahore X ===
Party	Candidate	Votes
PML-N	Mian Muhammad Shahbaz Sharif	95,864
PTI	Ch. Muhammad Mansha Sindho	49,148
PPP	Samina Khalid Ghurki	24,424
TLP	Amjad Naeem	7,308
TLI	Muhammad Nawaz	4,050

=== 2018 general election, NA-192 Dera Ghazi Khan IV ===
Party	Candidate	Votes
PTI	Sardar Muhammad Khan Leghari	80,683
PML-N	Mian Muhammad Shahbaz Sharif	67,753
PPP	Sardar Muhammad Irfan Ullah Khosa	6,620
TLP	Syed Munir Hussain	4,523

=== 2018 general election, NA-249 Karachi West II ===
Party	Candidate	Votes
PTI	Muhammad Faisal Vavda	35,349
PML-N	Mian Muhammad Shehbaz Sharif	34,626
TLP	Abid Hussain	23,981
MQM-P	Aslam Shah	13,534
MMA	Syed Atta Ullah Shah	10,307
PPP	Qadir Khan Mandokhel	7,236

=== 2024 general election, NA-123 Lahore VII ===
Party	Candidate	Votes
PML-N	Mian Muhammad Shehbaz Sharif	63,953
Independent	Afzaal Azeem Pahat	48,489
TLP	Amjad Naeem	20,160
Independent	Mian Muhammad Saleem	8,457
PPP	Muhammad Zia Ul Haq	5,698
JI	Liaqat Baloch	3,207

=== 2024 general election, NA-132 Kasur II ===
Sharif was elected from NA-132 (Kasur II), but later vacated the seat after retaining NA-123 (Lahore VII).

Party	Candidate	Votes
PML-N	Mian Muhammad Shehbaz Sharif	137,234
Independent	Sardar Muhammad Hussain Doger	111,128
TLP	Faqeer Hussain Bhatti	22,245
Independent	Hafiz Ebtisam Elahi Zaheer	11,944
PPP	Chaudhary Shaheem Safdar	6,219
JUI-F	Maulana Muhammad Rafique Kasori	3,269

== Provincial Assembly of Punjab elections ==
=== 1988 general election, PP-122 Lahore ===
Party	Candidate	Votes
IJI	Mian Muhammad Shahbaz Sharif	22,372
PPP	Syed Nazim Hussain	18,100
Independent	Mian Muhammad Saleem	155
Independent	Shah Muhammad Anwar Saeed	41
Independent	Mian Shahbaz Ahmad	32
Independent	Akhtar Hussain Siddiqi	25
Independent	Malik Hamid Sarfraz	14
Independent	Malik Muhammad Amjad Khan	8

=== 1990 general election, PP-124 Lahore ===
Party	Candidate	Votes
IJI	Mian Muhammad Shahbaz Sharif	26,408
PDA	Malik Abdul Abad	14,768
Independent	Qari Muhammad Azeem	283
Independent	Jamshaid Butt	175
Independent	Khalid Farooq	17
Independent	Ibrar Hussain	9
Independent	Khalid Mahmood alias Doctor Amber Shahzada	3

=== 1993 general election, PP-125 Lahore ===
Party	Candidate	Votes
PML-N	Mian Muhammad Shehbaz Sharif	28,068
PPP	Mazhar Iqbal Butt	20,626
Independent	Tariq Sana Bajwa	491
Independent	Muhammad Younas Khaliq	71
Independent	Muhammad Naeem Butt	55
NDA	Seth Bashir Ahmad	35

=== 1997 general election, PP-125 Lahore ===
Party	Candidate	Votes
PML-N	Mian Muhammad Shehbaz Sharif	25,013
PPP	Mazhar Iqbal Bhali Butt	6,212
PTI	Muhammad Saleem Butt	1,410
PPP-ZAB	Bashir Ahmad	502

=== 2008 by-election, PP-48 Bhakkar II ===
Sharif was elected unopposed from PP-48 (Bhakkar II) in a 2008 by-election after the remaining candidates withdrew.

=== 2013 general election, PP-159 Lahore XXIII ===
Party	Candidate	Votes
PML-N	Mian Muhammad Shehbaz Sharif	60,603
PTI	Ali Imtiaz	19,350
PPP-P	Muhammad Asif	6,108
Independent	Muhammad Sarwar	3,096
Independent	Ghulam Hussain	1,928
JUI-F	Muhammad Liaqat	1,899

=== 2013 general election, PP-161 Lahore XXV ===
Party	Candidate	Votes
PML-N	Mian Muhammad Shahbaz Sharif	60,311
PTI	Chaudhary Khalid Mahmood Gujjar	18,181
Independent	Abdul Rasheed Bhatti	14,569
PPP-P	Shaukat Ali Dogar	1,826
Independent	Tariq Saeed	1,184
MWM	Rai Nasir Ali	1,068

=== 2013 general election, PP-247 Rajanpur I ===
Party	Candidate	Votes
PML-N	Mian Muhammad Shahbaz Sharif	56,197
Independent	Sardar Ali Raza Khan Dreshak	25,567
PPP-P	Waqas Naveed Khan Gorchani	9,535
PTI	Mirza Abdul Karim	4,070
Independent	Zafrullaha Khan	2,728
JI	Munir Ahmad Qureshi	2,110

=== 2018 general election, PP-164 Lahore XXI ===
Party	Candidate	Votes
PML-N	Mian Muhammad Shehbaz Sharif	40,086
PTI	Yousaf Ali	19,216
PPP	Tahir Majeed	13,400
TLP	Maryum Azhar	2,856
TLI	Chaudhary Zaheer Ud Din	2,714
MMA	Muhammad Nazir	1,404

=== 2018 general election, PP-165 Lahore XXII ===
Party	Candidate	Votes
PML-N	Mian Muhammad Shahbaz Sharif	43,322
PTI	Muhammad Yousaf	22,950
PPP	Abdul Samad Khan	7,652
TLP	Amjad Naeem	3,245
Independent	Muhammad Saleem	1,194
PRHP	Hafiz Muhammad Hamza	928

=== 2024 general election, PP-158 Lahore XIV ===
Party	Candidate	Votes
PML-N	Mian Muhammad Shehbaz Sharif	38,642
Independent	Yousaf Ali	23,849
TLP	Majid Munir Awan	11,744
Independent	Chaudhary Muhammad Ali	4,525
JUI-F	Muhammad Ijaz	2,477

=== 2024 general election, PP-164 Lahore XX ===
Party	Candidate	Votes
PML-N	Mian Muhammad Shehbaz Sharif	27,099
Independent	Muhammad Yousaf Mayo	25,919
TLP	Amjad Naeem	7,129
PPP	Ghulam Mustafa	3,371
JI	Iftikhar Ahmad	1,425
Independent	Naveed Yousaf	1,082
PMML	Muhammad Akram	803

== Prime ministerial elections ==
=== 2018 prime ministerial election ===
Party	Candidate	Votes
PTI	Imran Khan	176
PML-N	Shehbaz Sharif	96

=== 2022 prime ministerial election ===
Sharif was elected prime minister after securing 174 votes in the National Assembly; no vote was polled in favour of Shah Mahmood Qureshi after PTI lawmakers boycotted the vote.

=== 2024 prime ministerial election ===
Party/alliance	Candidate	Votes
PML-N-led coalition	Shehbaz Sharif	201
SIC	Omar Ayub Khan	92
