= Syed Waqar Mehdi =

Pakistani politician

Senator of Pakistan
- In office March 2018 – March 2024
- Constituency: Sindh

Personal details
- Party: PPP (2018-present)

Syed Waqar Mehdi is a Pakistani politician who has been serving as a Senator since March 2018. He is a member of the Pakistan Peoples Party Parliamentarians (PPPP) and represents the province of Sindh in the Senate of Pakistan.
