= Sarmad Ali =

Member of the Senate of Pakistan from Sindh province

- سرمد علی

Member of the Senate of Pakistan
- Incumbent
- Assumed office 9 April 2024
- Constituency: Sindh

Personal details
- Party: PPP (2024-present)

Syed Sarmad Ali (Urdu: سید سرمد علی) is a Pakistani politician who is member of the Senate of Pakistan from Sindh province.

== Political career ==
Ali was elected from Sindh province during the 2024 Pakistani Senate election as a Pakistan People's Party Parliamentarians candidate on a reserved seat for technocrats.
