= Dost Ali Jessar =

Member of the Senate of Pakistan from Sindh province

- دوست علی جیسر

Member for the Senate of Pakistan
- Incumbent
- Assumed office April 2024
- Constituency: Sindh

Personal details
- Party: PPP (2024-present)
- Parent: Noor Muhammad Jessar (father)

Dost Ali Jessar دوست علي جيسرis a Pakistani politician who is senator-elect for the Senate of Pakistan from Sindh province.

== Political career ==
Jessar was elected from Sindh province during the 2024 Pakistani Senate election as a Pakistan People's Party Parliamentarians candidate on a general seat.
