= Parliament of Pakistan =

Bicameral federal legislature of Pakistan

Parliament of Pakistan: مجلسِ شوریٰ پاکستان; Majlis-e-Shūrā Pākistān
- State emblem of Pakistan

Type
- Type: Bicameral
- Houses: Senate; National Assembly

History
- Founded: 23 March 1956; 70 years ago
- Preceded by: Constituent Assembly of Pakistan

Leadership
- President of Pakistan (Note: Under the constitution, the President serves as the nominal head of the Parliament.): Asif Ali Zardari, PPP since 10 March 2024
- Chairman of the Senate: Yusuf Raza Gilani, PPP since 9 April 2024
- Deputy Chairman of the Senate: Syedaal Khan Nasar, PML(N) since 9 April 2024
- Speaker of the National Assembly: Ayaz Sadiq, PML(N) since 1 March 2024
- Deputy Speaker of the National Assembly: Ghulam Mustafa Shah, PPP since 1 March 2024
- Leader of the House in the Senate: Ishaq Dar, PML(N) since 30 September 2022
- Leader of the House in the National Assembly: Shehbaz Sharif, PML(N) since 3 March 2024
- Leader of the Opposition in the Senate: Raja Nasir Abbas Jafri, MWM since 19 January 2026
- Leader of the Opposition in the National Assembly: Mahmood Khan Achakzai, PkMAP since 16 January 2026

Structure
- Seats: 432: 96 Senators; 336 Members of the National Assembly
- Senate political groups: Government (71): PPP (26); PML(N) (19); JUI (F) (6); BAP (4); MQM-P (4); ANP (3); NP (1); PML(Q) (1); IND (6); Opposition (15): MWM (1); PTI (20)
- National Assembly political groups: Government (243): PML(N) (132); PPP (74); MQM-P (22); PML(Q) (4); IPP (4); PML(Z) (1); BAP (1); NP (1); Independent (4); Opposition (89): JUI-F (10); SIC (1); MWM (1); PKMAP (1); SIC (1); Independent (75)

Elections
- Senate voting system: Single transferable vote
- National Assembly voting system: Mixed-member majoritarian: 266 members directly elected by first-past-the-post; 60 seats for women and 10 seats for non-Muslim minorities through proportional representation
- Last Senate election: 2 April 2024
- Last National Assembly election: 8 February 2024
- Next Senate election: 2 April 2027
- Next National Assembly election: by 28 February 2029

Meeting place
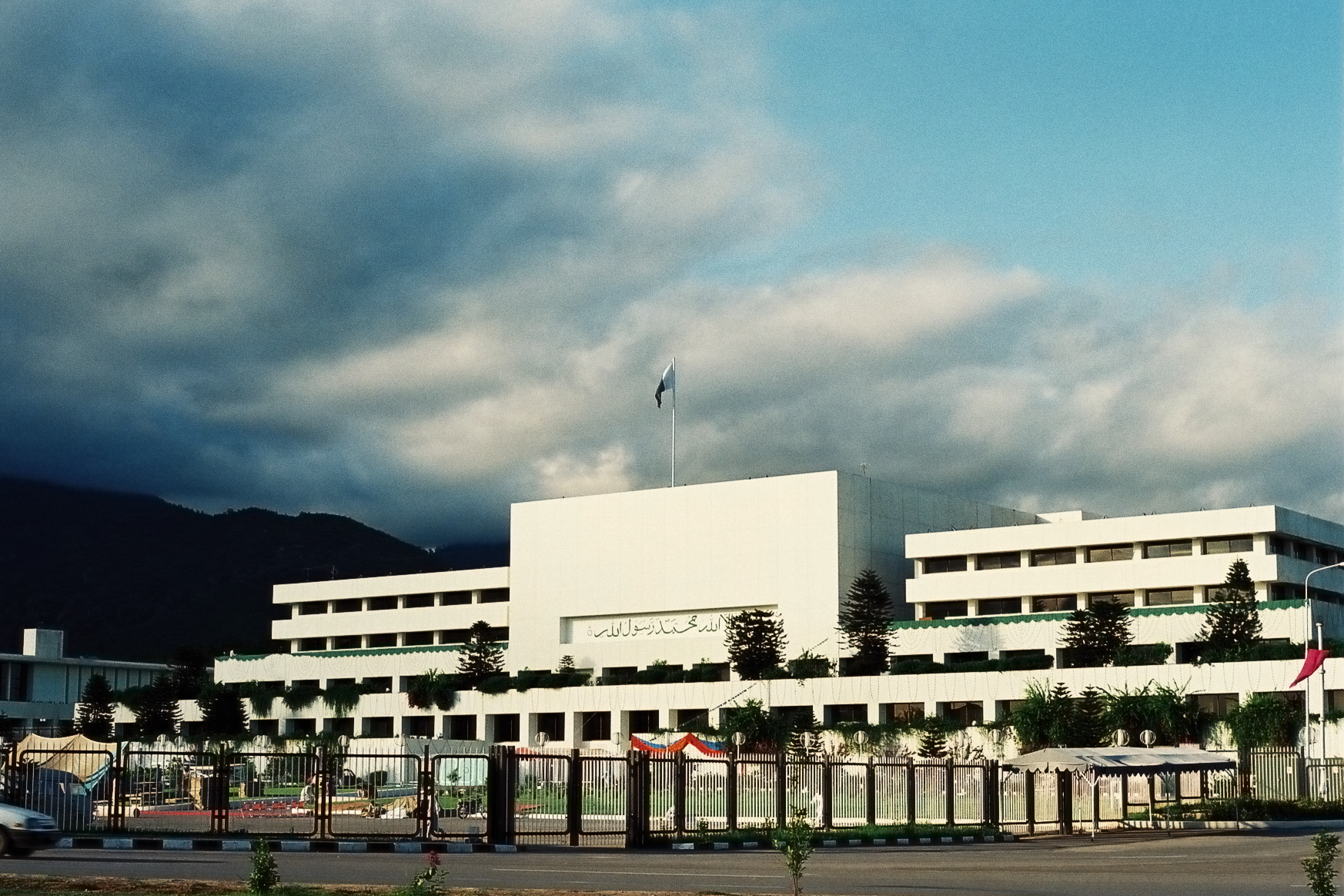
- Parliament House, Islamabad

Website
- Senate; www.senate.gov.pk; National Assembly; www.na.gov.pk

The Parliament of Pakistan (Note: Constitutional term: Urdu: مجلسِ شوریٰ پاکستان, Majlis-e-Shūrā Pākistān, lit. "Pakistan Advisory Council" or "Pakistan Consultative Assembly" Common term: Urdu: پارلیمانِ پاکستان, Pārlemān-e-Pākistān) is the supreme (Note: Unlike British parliamentary supremacy, the Constitution is supreme over the Parliament of Pakistan, Parliament operates under its limits, and there are constraints such as the judiciary's power to strike down laws.) legislative body of the Islamic Republic of Pakistan. It is a bicameral federal legislature, composed of the Senate and the National Assembly, with the President of Pakistan as the head of the legislature. The president, upon the advice of the Prime Minister, has full powers to summon and prorogue either house or a joint session of Parliament or to dissolve the National Assembly.

The parliament's both houses convene at the Parliament House within the governmental Red Zone of Islamabad, the federal capital. Both houses of the parliament have their own separate chambers; and in case of a joint session, the National Assembly chamber is used.

About 80 percent of the members of the National Assembly (MNAs) are directly elected by the voting of citizens in single-member constituencies under first-past-the-post voting system; while about 20 percent are elected on seats reserved for women and religious minorities, in accordance with parliamentary standing of the respective political parties. The senators are elected by the members of all provincial assemblies (MPAs) by proportional representation, while four represent the federal capital. (Note: Since the federal capital does not have its own legislative assembly, the four senators representing the federal capital are elected by the members of the National Assembly.) As of 2024, the parliament has a total strength of 432 with 336 members of the National Assembly (MNAs) and 96 senators. The term for an MNA is five years while for senator, it is 6 years.

== History ==
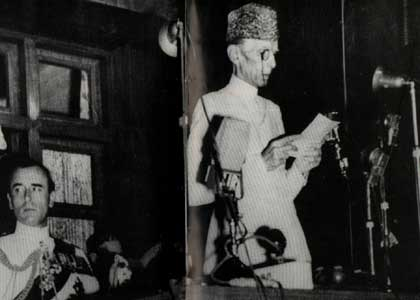
Muhammad Ali Jinnah replying to the Address by Lord Mountbatten in Constituent Assembly on 14 August 1947.

=== Founding ===
The Muslim League of the Indian subcontinent had, since the middle of twentieth century, demanded for a separate homeland on the basis of the Two-nation theory. The British rulers realized that the Hindus and Muslims of India remained two separate and distinct nations and socio-cultural entities. The British rulers were left with no option but to eventually accept the demand of the Muslims of India. On 3rd June 1947, Lord Mountbatten, the last Viceroy of India, called the conference of all the leaders of the Sub-continent and communicated to them his Government's Plan for the transfer of power. At that time, a notification was issued in the Gazette of India, published on 26 July 1947 in which the first Constituent Assembly of Pakistan was given shape with 69 Members (later on the membership was increased to 79), including one female Member. The State of Pakistan was created under the Independence Act of 1947. The Act made the existing Constituent Assemblies, the dominion legislatures. These Assemblies were allowed to exercise all the powers which were formerly exercised by the Central Legislature, in addition to the powers regarding the framing of a new Constitution, prior to which all territories were to be governed in accordance with the Government of India Act 1935. The first session of the first Constituent Assembly of Pakistan was held on 10 August 1947 at Sindh Assembly Building in Karachi. On 11 August 1947 Muhammad Ali Jinnah was elected unanimously as the president of the Constituent Assembly of Pakistan and the National Flag was formally approved by the Assembly. On 12 August 1947, a resolution was approved regarding officially addressing Jinnah as Quaid-i-Azam. On the same day, a special committee called the "Committee on Fundamental Rights of Citizens and Minorities of Pakistan" was appointed to look into and advise the Assembly on matters relating to fundamental rights of the citizens, particularly the minorities, with the aim to legislate on these issues appropriately. On 14 August 1947, the Transfer of Power took place. Lord Mountbatten, Governor General of India, addressed the Constituent Assembly of Pakistan. The Quaid gave a reply to the address in the house, on which the principles of the State of Pakistan were laid. On 15 August 1947, the Quaid-i-Azam was sworn in as the first Governor General of Pakistan. Mian Sir Abdur Rashid, Chief Justice of Pakistan, administered the oath of office from him. The Quaid remained in this position till his death on 11 September 1948.

=== 1949 Objectives Resolution ===
The foremost task before the first Constituent Assembly was the framing the Constitution for the nation. On 7 March 1949, the Objectives Resolution, which now serves as the basic law of Pakistan, was introduced by the first Prime Minister Nawabzada Liaquat Ali Khan, and later adopted by the Constituent Assembly on 12 March 1949. On the same day, a 24-member Basic Principles Committee was formed to prepare a draft Constitution on the basis of the Objectives Resolution. On 16 October 1951, Khan, the mover of the Objective Resolution, was assassinated and Khawaja Nazimuddin took over as the Prime Minister on 17 October 1951. The final draft of the Constitution was prepared in 1954. By that time, Muhammad Ali Bogra had taken over as the Prime Minister. However, just before the draft could be placed in the house for approval, the Assembly was dissolved by the then Governor General Ghulam Muhammad on 24 October 1954. The Prime Minister was, however, not dismissed and was asked to run the administration, with a reconstituted Cabinet, until such time as the elections were held. Maulvi Tamizuddin, President of the Assembly, challenged the dissolution in the Sindh Chief Court, and won the case. The Government in return, went to the Federal Court, where the famous judgment was given by the then Chief Justice Muhammad Munir, according to which Maulvi Tamizuddin lost the case.

Furthermore, according to the book: Nigel Kelly, the objective resolution was filed on 12 March 1949, filed by Khwaja Nazimudin, Liaquat ali khan along with 25 members of the basic principle committee. It declared the some objectives including that the legal system should be independent of government. It also contained references to Islam.

=== 1955 Second Constituent Assembly ===
The second Constituent Assembly of Pakistan was created on 28 May 1955 under Governor General's Order No.12 of 1955. The Electoral College for this Assembly was the Provincial Assemblies of respective Provinces. The strength of this Assembly was 80 Members, half each from East Pakistan and West Pakistan. One of the major decisions taken by this Assembly was the establishment of West Pakistan (One Unit), with the aim to create parity between the two wings (East and West Pakistan). This Assembly also achieved its target by giving the first Constitution to the nation i.e. the Constitution of Pakistan 1956. Chaudhry Muhammad Ali was the Prime Minister at that time. The draft of this Constitution was introduced in the Assembly on 9 January 1956 and was passed by the Assembly on 29 February 1956. The assent was given on it by the Governor General on 2 March 1956. This Constitution was enforced with effect from 23 March 1956. Under this Constitution, Pakistan became an Islamic Republic, hence 23 March became the country's Republic day. It was the same day in 1940 that the historic Pakistan Resolution was adopted at Minto Park, Lahore. On 5 March 1956, Major General Iskandar Mirza became the first President of Pakistan. The 1956 constitution provided for Parliamentary form of government with all the executive powers in the hands of Prime Minister. The President was the Head of State, and was to be elected by all Members of the National and Provincial Assemblies. He was to hold office for 5 years. The President was to act on the advice of Prime Minister, except where he was empowered to act in his discretion. Under 1956 Constitution, Parliament was unicameral. Legislative powers vested in the Parliament, which consisted of the president and the National Assembly with 300 Members divided equally between East and West Pakistan. In addition to these 300 seats, five seats were reserved for women for each of the two wings, for a period of ten years: thus bringing the total membership of the house to 310. However, in the absence of any law to control the Political Parties and the problem of floor crossing, political instability perpetually ensued. Although the first general election were scheduled for early 1959, President Iskandar Mirza abrogated the Constitution, dissolved the National and Provincial Assemblies, and declared Martial Law, on 7 October 1958. He appointed General Muhammad Ayub Khan, Commander-in-Chief of the Army, as the Chief Martial Law Administrator. The new administration did not satisfy CMLA Ayub Khan who had more control in the administration than President Mirza. Ayub dispatched the military unit to enter in presidential palace on the midnight of 26–27 October 1958 and placed him in an airplane to exile in England.

=== 1960 Constitution Commission ===
On 27 October 1958 General Muhammad Ayub Khan took over as second President of Pakistan. One of the first major steps taken by General Ayub Khan was the appointment of a Constitution Commission on 17 February 1960. The objective of this commission was to submit proposals, as to how best democracy can be strengthened and molded according to the country's socio-political environment and Islamic principles of justice. The Commission submitted its report to the government on 29 April 1961. On the basis of this report a new Constitution was framed and given to the nation on 1 March 1962. General elections under the new Constitution were held on 28 March 1962 and elections to the special seats reserved for women were held on 29 May 1962. The first session of the third National Assembly was held on 8 June 1962 at Ayub Hall, Rawalpindi. The Constitution of 1962 envisaged a Federal State with Presidential form of government, with the National Assembly at the centre and the Provincial Assemblies in the Provinces. The Legislatures, both at center and in provinces were unicameral. The Federal system had been curtailed by allowing the Provincial Governors to be appointed directly by the president. All executive authority of the Republic of Pakistan, under the Constitution, vested in the office of the president. The President appointed his Cabinet members who were directly responsible to him. The electoral system was made indirect, and the 'Basic Democrats', for both wings were declared Electoral College for the purpose of electing the assemblies and the president. Basic democrats were 80,000 in number (40,000 from each East and West Pakistan). The total membership of the National Assembly was 156, one half of whom were to be elected from East Pakistan and other half from West Pakistan, also three seats were reserved for women from each province. The term of this Assembly was three years. The norm was established that if the president was from West Pakistan, the Speaker was to be from East Pakistan and vice versa. One of the major achievements of this Assembly was the passage of Political Parities Act, 1962. On 25 March 1969 the second Martial law was imposed and General Agha Muhammad Yahya Khan took over as the president of Pakistan and Chief Martial Law Administrator (CMLA). He later issued a Legal Framework Order (LFO), under which the first ever general elections were held on 7 December 1970. This was the first Assembly elected on the adult franchise and population basis. It consist of 313 members, 169 from East Pakistan and 144 from West Pakistan including 13 reserved seats for women (6 were from West Pakistan and 7 from East Pakistan). Soon after the elections, due to grave political differences, the Province of East Pakistan seceded from West Pakistan and became Bangladesh. On 20 December 1971 Mr. Zulfiqar Ali Bhutto took over as the President of Pakistan as well as the first civil Chief Martial Law Administrator.

=== 1973 Constitution of the Islamic Republic of Pakistan ===
The first session of the National Assembly, due to the delay caused by the separation of East Pakistan, was held on 14 April 1972 at the State Bank Building, Islamabad, in which all 144 Members from West Pakistan and two from former East Pakistan (Mr. Noor-ul-Amin and Raja Tridev Roy who had chosen to join Pakistan) participated. On 17 April 1972 an Interim Constitution was adopted by the National Assembly, which provided for a Presidential form of Government. Under this Constitution, the National Assembly was not to be dissolved earlier than 14 August 1973. The Interim Constitution dealt in detail with the distribution of powers between the Centre and the Provinces. The Assembly also formed a Constitution Committee on 17 April 1972 to prepare the first draft for framing a Constitution. The report of the committee was presented with a draft Constitution on 31 December 1972. It was unanimously passed by the Assembly in its session on 10 April 1973 and was authenticated by the president on 12 April 1973. This Constitution, called the Constitution of the Islamic Republic of Pakistan 1973, was promulgated on 14 August 1973. On the same day, Mr. Zulfiqar Ali Bhutto took oath as the Prime Minister, while Mr. Fazal Illahi Choudhary took oath as the president of Pakistan. The 1973 Constitution provides for a parliamentary form of government where the executive authority of the state vests with the Prime Minister. The President, according to the Constitution, is at the apex, representing the unity of the Republic. From 1947 to 1973, the country had had a unicameral system, but under the 1973 Constitution, Pakistan adopted a bicameral federal legislature, called Parliament, composed of the President, the Senate and the National Assembly. Originally, the general seats of the National Assembly were 200 with additional 10 seats reserved for women, bringing the total strength to 210. The newly created Upper house i.e. the Senate had 63 members. Later in 1985 through a Presidential Order (P.O. No. 14 of 1985), seven seats were added to the general seats and ten to the reserved seats for women in the National Assembly. Ten seats were exclusively reserved for minorities to be filled through separate electorate system. Thus the total strength of the lower house reached to 237 members. Similarly the size of the Senate was also increased from 63 to 87 members.

Under the 1973 Constitution the National Assembly is elected for five years term, unless sooner dissolved. The seats in National Assembly, unlike the Senate, are allocated to each province and other units of the federation, on the basis of population. The Constitutional provision of 20 special seats for women lapsed in 1990, thus decreased the Assembly strength from 237 to 217. Under the Constitution, elections to the 10 seats reserved for minority were held on separate electorate basis. Despite the tenure of the Assembly being five years, as prescribed in the Constitution, Mr. Z.A. Bhutto, on 7 January 1977 announced the holding of elections before time. Consequently, on 10 January 1977, he advised the president to dissolve the National Assembly. Elections were held on 7 March 1977. The opposition charged the government with rigging the elections to the National Assembly and thereafter boycotted the Provincial Assemblies elections. Since the opposition had not accepted the National Assembly elections result, they did not take oath. This resulted in severe political crisis and Martial Law was imposed by the then Army Chief, General Muhammad Zia-ul-Haq, on 5 July 1977.

=== 1981 Majlis-e-Shoora ===
On 25 December 1981, under Presidential Order (P.O.15 of 1981) a Federal Council (Majlis-e-Shoora) was constituted by the president. Its members were nominated by the president. The first session of this council was held on 11 January 1982. In this way, limited and controlled political activities were resumed. General elections were later held for the National and Provincial Assemblies on 25 February 1985, on non-party basis.

1985 Amendments

On 2 March 1985, the revival of Constitution Order (P.O.14 of 1985) was issued in which a large number of amendments were made in the Constitution. Article 1 substituted the name "Parliament" for the more Islamic term Majlis-e-Shoora. The first session of the National Assembly was held 20 March 1985. Mr. Muhammad Khan Junejo, was nominated as the Prime Minister of Pakistan by the president (General Zia-ul-Haq). He received vote of confidence on 24 March 1985. In November 1985, the 8th Constitutional Amendment was adopted by the Parliament. Besides changes in other Articles in the Constitution the significant Article 58(2)(b) was added, according to which the president acquired discretionary powers to dissolves the National Assembly. On 29 May 1988 the Assembly was dissolved by the president by using the power acquired under Article 58(2)(b).

=== 1988 elections ===
The General elections for the eighth National Assembly was held on 16 November 1988. The first session was convened by the President on 30 November 1988. Mr. Miraj Khalid was elected as the Speaker of the National Assembly on 3 December 1988. Benazir Bhutto was nominated as Prime Minister of Pakistan and took the oath of the Office on 2 December 1988. The Assembly was later dissolved by President Ghulam Ishaq Khan under Article 58(2)(b) of the Constitution of Pakistan, on 6 August 1990. The General elections for the ninth National Assembly was held on 24 October 1990. The first session was held on 3 November 1990. Mr. Gohar Ayub Khan was elected as the Speaker of the National Assembly and he took oath on 4 November 1990. Muhammad Nawaz Sharif was elected as Prime Minister of Pakistan and took oath on 11 November 1990. The Assembly was again dissolved by the then President Ghulam Ishaq Khan, under Article 58(2)(b) on 18 April 1993. The dissolution of the National Assembly was challenged in the Supreme Court of Pakistan and after hearing the case the Assembly was restored by the Supreme Court on 26 May 1993. The Assembly was later dissolved on the advice of the Prime Minister on 18 July 1993.

=== 1993 Tenth National Assembly ===
The elections for tenth National Assembly was held on 6 October 1993. The first session was held on 15 October 1993. Syed Yousaf Raza Gillani took oath of the office of the Speaker National Assembly on 17 October 1993. Benazir Bhutto administered the oath as Prime Minister of Pakistan on 19 October 1993. The Assembly was dissolved by President Farooq Ahmad Khan Laghari on 5 November 1996. The elections for eleventh National Assembly was held on 3 February 1997. The first session was held on 15 February 1997. Mr. Illahi Bukhsh Soomro took oath of the office of the Speaker National Assembly on 16 February 1997. Mian Muhammad Nawaz Sharif took oath as prime minister of Pakistan and leader of the house on 17 February 1997. The new Assembly came into power with an overwhelming majority. The Article 58(2)(b) was later on omitted from the Constitution vide 13th Amendment in the Constitution in April 1997. It may be pertinent to note at this point that while, ostensibly, sixteen amendments have been made in the Constitution so far, the ninth and the eleventh Constitutional Amendments were, however, passed by the Senate alone and fifteenth by the National Assembly alone, hence these amendments lapsed. The fourteenth Amendment in the Constitution empowered a check on floor crossing of legislators.

=== 1999 Musharraf Emergency ===
Chief of Army Staff General Pervez Musharraf, who was also Chairman Joint Staff Committee, took over the government from Prime Minister Nawaz Sharif and declared himself as Chief Executive through a Proclamation of Emergency, on 12 October 1999. Through Provisional Constitutional Order (PCO) issued on 14 October 1999, he held the Constitution in abeyance, suspended the Senate, National and Provincial Assemblies, chairman and Deputy Chairman Senate, Speaker, Deputy Speaker National and Provincial Assemblies and dismissed the Federal and Provincial governments. President Mr. Muhammad Rafiq Tarar was, however, allowed to continue in his office. Under PCO (order No. 6) 29 October 1999, (as amended by C.E. Order No.5, 4 July 2001), the National Security Council was established for the purpose to tender advice to the Chief Executive (later on President), on matters relating to Islamic ideology, national security, sovereignty, integrity and solidarity of Pakistan so as to achieve the aims and objective as enshrined in the Objectives Resolution 1949.

Syed Zafar Ali Shah, MNA and Illahi Bukhsh Soomro, Speaker National Assembly, challenged the suspension orders in the Supreme Court. The Court in its judgment on 12 May 2000 validated the military takeover by giving three years time frame to the government, starting from 12 October 1999. The Court in its judgement asked the government to complete its agenda and then hand over powers to the elected government. The court also allowed the military government to bring necessary Constitutional Amendments, provided that those should not change the basic feature of Federal Parliamentary democracy, independence of judiciary and Islamic provisions in the Constitution. The court reserved the right of Judicial Review and power of validity of any act or any action of the government, if challenged, in the light of State necessity. On 20 June 2001, through a notification (C.E. Order No.1) the Chief Executive assumed the office of the president of Pakistan under President's Succession Order, 2001. On the same day, through another Order (C.E. Order No. 2, 2001), the president converted the orders of suspension of legislative bodies and their presiding officers, into dissolution. The elections for twelfth National Assembly was held on 10 October 2002. The inaugural session of the National Assembly was held on 16 November 2002 and Ch Amir Hussain and Sardar Muhammad Yaqoob were elected Speaker and Deputy Speaker respectively on 19 November 2002. Mir Zafar ullah Jamali was elected leader of the house on 21 November 2002. Speaker Chaudhry Amir Hussain gave the ruling on 14 June 2003 that LFO is the part of the Constitution of Pakistan. On this issue, Opposition Parties submitted a resolution for vote of no confidence against Speaker National Assembly on 20 June 2003 which was rejected on 28 June 2003.

National Assembly of Pakistan expressed confidence in the leadership of President General Pervez Musharraf through the resolution on 1 January 2004. President General Pervez Musharraf addressed the Joint Session of the Parliament on 17 January 2004. Prime Minister Mir Zafarullah Khan Jamali resigned from his office on 26 June 2004. Chaudhry Shujaat Hussain was elected the 21st Prime Minister of Pakistan on 29 June 2004 and obtained a vote of confidence from the National Assembly on 30 June 2004. Mr. Shaukat Aziz was elected the leader of the house on 27 August 2004 and was administered oath of the Prime Minister of Pakistan on 28 August 2004. National Assembly of Pakistan completed its Constitutional tenure on 15 November 2007. After the resignation from the post of Chief of Army Staff, Mr. Pervez Musharraf administered the oath of President of Islamic Republic of Pakistan on 29 November 2007.

=== 2008 Election ===
The date of next General Election was fixed for 28 January 2008. After the assassination of Muhtarma Benazir Bhutto on 27 December 2007, date of election was rescheduled for 18 February 2008. The first session of the National Assembly was held on 17 March 2008. Dr. Fehmida Mirza and Mr. Fasial Karim Kundi were elected Speaker and Deputy Speaker of the National Assembly respectively on 19 March 2008. Syed Yousaf Raza Gilani was elected the Prime Minister of Pakistan by the house on 24 March 2008 and unanimously obtained the Vote of Confidence from the house on 29 March 2008. Mr. Pervez Musharraf submitted his resignation from his office to the Speaker National Assembly on 18 August 2008 and Mr. Asif Ali Zardari was elected 13th President of Pakistan for next five years on 6 September 2008.

=== President Zardari ===
He addressed the Joint Session of the Parliament on 20 September 2008. President Asif Ali Zardari during his address to the Joint Session of the Parliament on 28 March 2009 asked the Speaker National Assembly to form a committee of both houses for the purpose of proposing amendments in the Constitution in the light of Charter of Democracy (COD). After consultation with the leadership of all political parties in the Parliament, Speaker National Assembly announced the Constitutional Reforms Committee (CRC) on 29 April 2009. After the marathon consultation in 77 meetings, CRC under the Chairmanship of Senator Raza Rabbani presented report of the committee on 18th Amendment in the Constitution to the Speaker National Assembly on 31 March 2010. The historic 18th Constitutional Amendment was presented and passed by the National Assembly on 8 April 2010 and Senate on 15 April 2010 respectively. After the assent of the president on 19 April 2010, 18th Amendments became part of Constitution of the Islamic Republic of Pakistan. 19th Amendment was passed by the National Assembly on 22 December 2010 and Senate on 30 December 2010 respectively. 19th Amendment became part of the Constitution after the assent of President Asif Ali Zardari on 1 January 2011. 20th Amendment was passed unanimously by National Assembly and Senate on 20 February 2012.

== National Assembly (Aiwan-e-Zeerin or Lower House) ==
Qaumi Assembly (English: National Assembly of Pakistan) is the lower house of the parliament. The National Assembly has 336 seats, 266 of which are directly elected, 60 are reserved for women and a further 10 for religious minorities^{5}. The National Assembly of Pakistan is the country's sovereign legislative body. It embodies the will of the people to let themselves be governed under the democratic, multi-party Federal Parliamentary System. The National Assembly makes laws for the Federation in respect of the powers enumerated in the Federal Legislative list. Through its debates, adjournment motion, question hour and Standing Committees, the National Assembly keeps as check over the Executive and ensures that the government functions within the parameters set out in the Constitution and does not violate the fundamental rights of citizens. Only the National Assembly, through its Public Accounts Committee, scrutinizes public spending and exercises control of expenditure incurred by the government. The Members of the National Assembly are to be elected by direct and free vote in accordance with law.

Article 50 of the Constitution provides that the Parliament of Pakistan shall consist of president and the two houses known as the National Assembly and the Senate. The National Assembly has an edge over the Senate by legislating exclusively on money matters. With exception to money bills, however, both the houses work together to carry out the basic work of the Parliament, i.e. law making. The bill relating to the Federal Legislative List can be originated in either house. If the house passed the bill through majority vote, it shall be transmitted to the other house. If the other house passes it without amendment, it shall be presented to the president for assent. If the bill, transmitted to the other house, is not passed within ninety days or rejected, it shall be considered in a joint sitting to be summoned by the president on the request of the house in which the bill was originated. If the bill is passed in the joint sitting, with or without amendments, by the votes of majority of the members of the two houses, it shall be presented to the president for assent.

If the bill is presented to the president for assent, he shall assent to the bill in not later than ten days. If it is not a money bill, the president may return the bill to the Majlis-e-Shoora with a message requesting that the bill be reconsidered and that an amendment specified in the message be considered. The Majlis-e-Shoora shall reconsider the bill in a joint sitting. If the bill is passed again, with or without amendment, by vote of the majority of the members present and voting, it shall be presented to the president and the president shall give his assent within ten days; failing which such assent shall be deemed to have been given. Under the Constitution, the Parliament may also legislate for two or more Provinces by consent and request made by those Provinces. If the Federal Government proclaims State of Emergency in any province, the power to legislate about that province is vested in the Parliament. But the bills passed by the Parliament during the State of Emergency, shall cease to be in force after the expiration of six months from the date Emergency is lifted. Nevertheless, the steps already taken under these Acts shall remain valid. In exercises of its constitutional role, the Parliament also has other very important duties to perform. The president, who is at the apex, is elected by members of both houses of the Parliament and the Provincial Assemblies. The Prime Minister, who heads the Cabinet and is meant to aid and advise the president in his functions, belongs to the National Assembly. He enjoys the confidence of the majority of the members of the National Assembly. Members of the Cabinet are appointed by the president on the advice of the prime minister.

In the formation of the Cabinet the major portion (75%), goes to National Assembly while the rest (25%) are taken from the Senate. Under Article 95 of the constitution, a vote of no-confidence by the majority of the National Assembly serves as the democratic procedure for removing the Prime Minister from office. In this respect a resolution for a vote of no-confidence is moved by not less than 20% of the total membership of the National Assembly. If the resolution is passed by majority of the total membership of the National Assembly, the Prime Minister immediately ceases to hold the office. Similarly, for the removal or impeachment of the president, not less than one-half of the total membership of either house may give in writing its intention to do so, to the Speaker National Assembly, or, as the case may be, to the Chairman Senate, for moving a resolution for the purpose. In a joint sitting of the two houses, convened for the purpose, and after the deliberations, if the resolution is passed by the votes of not less than two thirds of the total membership of the Parliament, the president shall cease to hold office immediately on the passing of the resolution. In case emergency is proclaimed, the Parliament holds the authority to extend the term of the National Assembly. Under the Constitution, the Parliament may also, on the request of the Federal Government, by law, confer functions upon officers or authorities subordinate to the Federal Government.

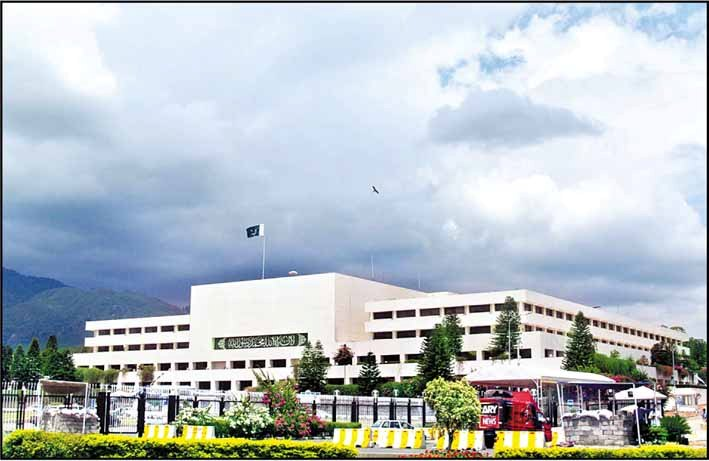
Parliament House

== Senate (Aiwan-e Bala or Upper House) ==
The main purpose for the creation of the Aiwan-e Bala (English: Senate of Pakistan) was to give equal representation to all the federating units since the membership of the National Assembly was based on the population of each province. Equal provincial membership in the Senate, thus, balances the provincial inequality in the National Assembly and dispels doubts and apprehension, if any, regarding deprivation and exploitation. The role of the Senate is to promote national cohesion and harmony and to alleviate fears of the smaller provinces regarding domination by any one province because of its majority, in the National Assembly. The Senate, is a body which represents the provinces/territories of the country and promotes a feeling of equality, peace and harmony, which is essential for the growth and prosperity of a nation. Thus, the Senate in Pakistan, over the years, has emerged as an essential organ and a stabilizing factor of the federation. The Senate consists of 100 members. Each of the four provincial assemblies shall elect in the next Senate election twenty three members from their respective provinces that include fourteen on general seats, four on seats reserved for technocrats including Ulema, four on seats reserved for women and one on seat reserved for non-Muslims, 4 members are elected from Federally Administered Tribal Areas (FATA) by the members of National Assembly from these areas, 2 members, 1 woman and 1 technocrat is elected from the Federal Capital by the members of National Assembly, It is the responsibility of the Chief Election Commissioner to hold and make arrangements for the Senate elections in accordance with the system of proportional representation by means of a single transferable vote through electoral colleges. The term of the members of the Senate is 6 years. However, the term of the first group of the Senators, who shall retire after completion of first 3 years of the Senate, is determined by drawing of lots by the Chief Election Commissioner.

== Electoral procedure ==
At the national level, Pakistan elects a bicameral legislature, the Parliament of Pakistan, which consists of a directly elected National Assembly of Pakistan and a Senate, whose members are chosen by elected provincial legislators. The Prime Minister of Pakistan is elected by the National Assembly. The president is elected by the Electoral college, which consists of both houses of Parliament together with the provincial assemblies. In addition to the national parliament and the provincial assemblies, Pakistan also has more than five thousand elected local governments. Elections in Pakistan are conducted under the supervision of Election Commission of Pakistan. The country offers a multi-party system, with numerous parties. Frequently, no single party holds a majority, and therefore parties must form alliances during or after elections, with coalition governments forming out of negotiations between parties. The Parliament of Pakistan consists of the president and two houses to be known respectively as National Assembly and the Senate. The National Assembly consists of 342 Seats including 60 seats reserved for Women and 10 Seats reserved for Non-Muslims. The Senate consists of 104 Members including 17 Seats reserved for Women and 17 Seats reserved for Technocrats and Ulema. The Members of the National Assembly are elected for a term of 5 years whereas the Members of the Senate are elected for a term of 6 years with staggered elections every 3 years

The Parliament of Pakistan – viz the Constituent Assembly of Pakistan – met on 10 August 1947 in the old Sindh Assembly Building at Karachi. It was in this venue that the Objectives Resolution, which now serves as the Grundnorm of Pakistan, was passed. In 1956, the first Constitution of the Islamic Republic of Pakistan was adopted in Karachi at the same Sindh Assembly building which also passed as the Parliament of Pakistan. After the adoption of the Second Constitution of 1962, Parliament sessions were arranged both at Dhaka and a newly constructed building (Ayub Hall) at Rawalpindi. The Parliament was unicameral. At the first session of the Parliament at the Ayub Hall, the martial law, imposed in 1958, was revoked. Later, in October, 1966, the Parliament was shifted to Dhaka. From 1972 onward, the State Bank auditorium in Islamabad functioned as the National Assembly of Pakistan. The Interim Constitution of Pakistan was adopted here in April, 1972. It was here that the first bicameral legislature of Pakistan was also born after the Constitution of the Islamic Republic of Pakistan was adopted in 1973. It was again here that the Martial Law, imposed in July, 1977, was revoked on 30 December 1985. The Parliament – the Senate and the National Assembly – have acquired a permanent abode in the present Parliament House, which was inaugurated on 28 May 1986. The Hall was renovated on the orders of the Speaker and inaugurated by the Prime Minister of Pakistan on 3 November 1996.

== See also ==
- Political history of Pakistan
- Politics of Pakistan
- List of constituencies of Pakistan
- National Assembly of Pakistan
- Senate of Pakistan
