= Hasna Bano =

Member of the Senate of Pakistan from Balochistan province

- حَسنہ بانو

Member for the Senate of Pakistan
- Incumbent
- Assumed office 9 April 2024
- Constituency: Balochistan, Pakistan

Personal details
- Party: PPP (2024-present)

Hasna Bano (Urdu: حَسنہ بانو) is a Pakistani politician who is senator-elect for the Senate of Pakistan from Balochistan province.

== Political career ==
Bano was elected from Balochistan province during the 2024 Pakistani Senate election as a Pakistan People's Party Parliamentarians candidate on a reserved seat for women.
