= Bilal Khan Mandokhail =

Member of the Senate of Pakistan from Balochistan province

- بلال خان مندوخیل

Member for the Senate of Pakistan
- Incumbent
- Assumed office 9 April 2024
- Constituency: Balochistan, Pakistan

Personal details
- Party: PPP (2024-present)

Bilal Khan Mandokhail (Urdu: بلال خان مندوخیل) is a Pakistani politician who is senator-elect for the Senate of Pakistan from Balochistan province.

== Political career ==
Mandokhail was elected from Balochistan province during the 2024 Pakistani Senate election as a Pakistan People's Party Parliamentarians candidate on a reserved seat for technocrats.
