= Nadeem Ahmed Bhutto =

Member of the Senate of Pakistan from Sindh province

- ندیم احمد بھُٹو

Member for the Senate of Pakistan
- Incumbent
- Assumed office 9 April 2024
- Constituency: Sindh

Personal details
- Party: PPP (2024-present)

Nadeem Ahmed Bhutto (Urdu: ندیم احمد بھُٹو) is a Pakistani politician who is senator-elect for the Senate of Pakistan from Sindh province.

== Political career ==
Bhutto was elected from Sindh province during the 2024 Pakistani Senate election as a Pakistan People's Party Parliamentarians candidate on a general seat.
