= Syed Muhammad Zafar =

Pakistani politician (1930–2023)

- ایس ایم ظفر

Member of the Senate of Pakistan
- In office March 2006 – March 2012
- President: Asif Ali Zardari
- Prime Minister: Yousaf Raza Gillani

Minister of Justice
- In office 1965–1969
- Leader: Field Marshal Ayub Khan

Official posts
- 1975: President, High Court Bar Association, Lahore
- 1979: President, Supreme Court Bar Association
- 1983: Chairman, Human Rights Society of Pakistan
- 1987: Chairman, Cultural Association of Pakistan
- 1997: Chancellor of Hamdard University

Personal details
- Born: 6 December 1930 Rangoon, Burma, British India
- Died: 19 October 2023 (aged 92) Lahore, Punjab, Pakistan
- Other political affiliations: Pakistan Muslim League (Q) (PMLQ)
- Spouse: Saifee Syed
- Children: 4, including Roshaneh and Syed Ali
- Education: Punjab University Law College (PULC)

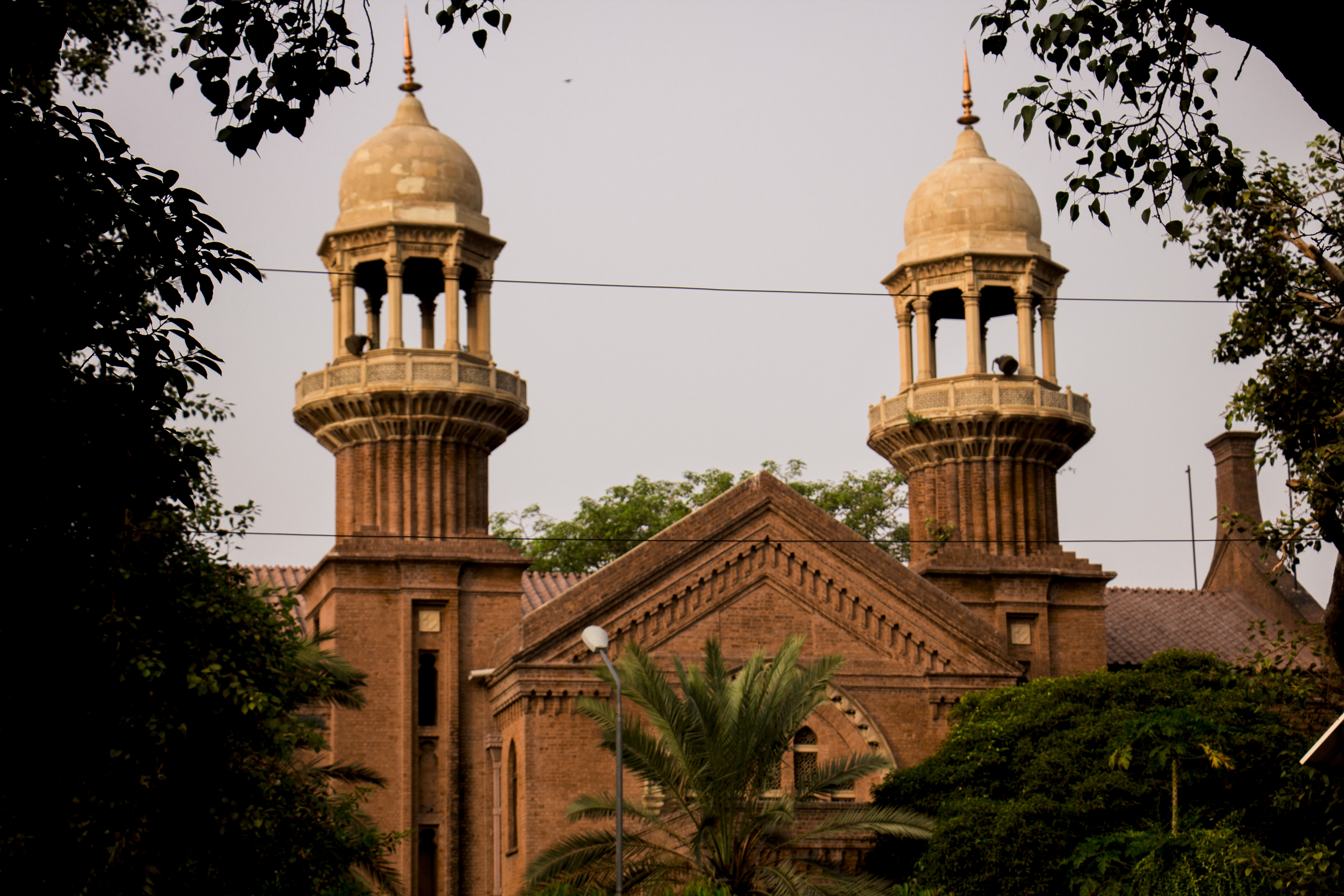
Lahore High Court

Syed Muhammad Zafar (Urdu: سید محمد ظفر; 6 December 1930 – 19 October 2023), commonly known as S. M. Zafar, was a Pakistani human rights activist, lawyer (Senior Advocate Supreme Court), and politician who was a member of the Senate of Pakistan. For some time, he was affiliated with the Pakistan Muslim League (Q) (PMLQ).

== Early life ==
Syed Muhammad Zafar was born on 6 December 1930 in Rangoon, Burma, where his father worked in the construction business. His family hailed from the town of Shakargarh in Punjab. Following the Japanese occupation of Burma, his family returned to their native village in 1944.

== Career ==
Zafar began his career as a lawyer in the 1950s. He played an important role during the 1958 imposition of martial law in Pakistan and again in forcing amendments to the Constitution of Pakistan of 1962, which at first did not have sufficient protections for basic human rights.

After serving as a judge of the high court and as Pakistan's Minister for Law and Justice from 1965 to 1969, Zafar retired from the government in 1968 and started his own law practice.

Zafar and a few of his contemporaries founded the Human Rights Society of Pakistan in 1976.

Zafar was awarded an honorary PhD degree in law at the University of the Punjab's 124th convocation. He retired from active law practice in 2012.

In 2018, he quit politics and parted ways with the PMLQ.

== Official posts ==
- Federal Minister for Law and Justice (Pakistan) (1965–69)
- President High Court Bar Association, Lahore (1975)
- President, Pakistan's Supreme Court Bar Association (1979)
- Chairman, Human Rights Society of Pakistan
- Chairman, Cultural Association of Pakistan
- Chancellor of Hamdard University

== News media commentator ==
After retirement from his official government service in 1968, he was a frequent commentator on current affairs in Pakistan.

== Death ==
S. M. Zafar died on 19 October 2023, at the age of 92 in Lahore after a prolonged illness.

== See also ==
- Syed Ali Zafar
- Supreme Court Bar Association of Pakistan

== Bibliography ==
- Zafar, S.M. (1970). Through the crisis. Lahore: Book Centre.
- Zafar, S.M. (2005). Dictator kaun? [Who is Dictator?] (in Urdu). Not identified: Brite Books. ISBN 9789698780104. OCLC 656142099.
- Zafar, S.M. (2008). ʻAvām, pārlīmanṭ, Islām [People, Parliament and Islam] (in Urdu). Lahore: ilm-o-irfan. ISBN 9789698780029.
- Zafar, S.M. (1978). Haj: a journey in obedience. Lahore: Ripon Printing Press.
- Zafar, S.M. Tazkaray-Jaizay [Views & Reviews].
- Zafar, S.M. (1997). Understanding statutes: canons of construction. Lahore: Brite Books.
- Zafar, S.M. میرے مشہور مقدمے [My Popular Law Cases].
- Zafar, S.M. Pakistan Banam Corruption : Awam Ki Adalat Main [Pakistan Benaam Corruption (Awam KI Adalat Mein)]. ISBN 9789663707303.
- Zafar, S.M. Adalat Main Siyasat - عدالت میں سیاست [Politics in the Court of Law (Adalat Mein Siyasat)]. Brite Books, Lahore. ISBN 978-969-878013-5.
- Zafar, S.M. (2004). Dialogue On The Political Chess Board. Lahore, Pakistan; Brite Books, 2004; PLD Publishers, 2008; Punjab, Pakistan; BRITE BOOKS 2004; Lahore; Brite Books, Edition: 1st ed DDC classification: KIC 324.56 Z17D 2004; LAHORE BRITE BOOKS 2004: Brite Books. ISBN 9789698780012.
- Zafar, S.M. (2014). Be A Competent Lawyer. Sagar Publications.
- Zafar, S.M. (2016). Understanding statutes : canons of construction. Lahore: Manzoor Law Book House.
- Zafar, S.M. (2019). History of Pakistan Reinterpreted: Constitutional, Political, Social. Lahore: Manzoor Law Book House.
