= Zamir Hussain Ghumro =

Member of the Senate of Pakistan from Sindh province

- ضمیر حُسین گھُمرو

Member for the Senate of Pakistan
- Incumbent
- Assumed office 9 April 2024
- Constituency: Sindh

Personal details
- Party: PPP (2024-present)

Zamir Hussain Ghumro (Urdu: ضمیر حُسین گھُمرو) is a Pakistani politician who is senator-elect for the Senate of Pakistan from Sindh province.

== Political career ==
Ghumro was elected from Sindh province during the 2024 Pakistani Senate election as a Pakistan People's Party Parliamentarians candidate on a reserved seat for technocrats.
