= Poonjo Mal Bheel =

Member of the Senate of Pakistan from Sindh province

- پُونجو مل بھِیل

Member for the Senate of Pakistan
- Incumbent
- Assumed office 9 April 2024
- Constituency: Sindh

Member of the Provincial Assembly of Sindh
- In office 2002–2007
- Constituency: Seat Reserved for Non-Muslims
- In office 2013–2016

Personal details
- Born: Umerkot district, Sindh, Pakistan
- Party: MQM-P (2026-present)
- Other political affiliations: PPP (2016-2025); MQM-P (2002-2016)

Poonjo Mal Bheel (Sindhi: پُونجو مل ڀِيل:Urdu: پُونجو مل بھِیل) is a Pakistani politician who is senator-elect for the Senate of Pakistan from Sindh province.

== Personal life ==
Bheel lives in Bheel colony in Umerkot district.

== Political career ==
Bheel had contested earlier as an independent candidate in loval election and won. Later he joined MQM. He served as a MPA in Sindh provincial assembly from 2002 to 2007 on minority seat and again from 2013 to 2016. In 2016, he joined PPP. He quit MQM primarily because of MQM chief Altaf Hussain’s statement advocating the breakup of Sindh and the creation of a new province.

Bheel was elected from Sindh province during the 2024 Pakistani Senate election as a Pakistan People's Party Parliamentarians candidate on a seat reserved for minorities.

He is also serving as a Committee Member for the Senate House Committees on Water Resources, Devolution, Minority Caucus, Human Rights, National Food Security and Research and Power.
