= Jan Muhammad Buledi =

Member of the Senate of Pakistan from Balochistan province

- جان محمد بُلیدی

Member for the Senate of Pakistan
- Incumbent
- Assumed office 9 April 2024
- Constituency: Balochistan, Pakistan

Personal details
- Party: NP (2024-present)

Jan Muhammad Buledi (Urdu: جان محمد بُلیدی) is a Pakistani politician who is senator-elect for the Senate of Pakistan from Balochistan province.

== Political career ==
Buledi was elected from Balochistan province during the 2024 Pakistani Senate election as a National Party candidate on a general seat. https://tribune.com.pk/story/2539385/np-slams-injustice-against-balochistan
