= Amir Chishti =

Member of the Senate of Pakistan from Sindh province

- عامر چِشتی

Senate of Pakistan
- Incumbent
- Assumed office April 2024
- Constituency: Sindh

Personal details
- Born: Karachi, Sindh, Pakistan
- Party: MQM-P (2024-present)

Amir Waliuddin Chishti (Urdu: عامر ولیُ الدین چِشتی) is a Pakistani politician and businessman who has been a member of the Senate of Pakistan since April 2024. He is also the chairman of Darul Sehat Hospital, its medical school Liaquat College of Medicine & Dentistry, and the owner of Puma Energy Pakistan. Previously, he served as the chief executive officer (CEO) of Admore Gas until March 1, 2016.

== Political career ==
Chishti began his political career by joining the All Pakistan Muttahidda Students Organization. He served as the unit in-charge of Government Premier College in North Nazimabad in the early 1990s.

In April 2024, Chishti was elected from Sindh province during the 2024 Pakistani Senate election as a Muttahida Qaumi Movement – Pakistan candidate on a general seat.

== Controversy ==
In 2019, Chishti faced legal action after the death of nine-month-old Nashwa, who reportedly suffered from improper treatment at his hospital in Gulistan-e-Jauhar, Karachi. On April 7, the treatment allegedly led to paralysis and the infant's subsequent death. Following these events, Chishti's application for interim pre-arrest bail was denied by an additional district and sessions' judge in Karachi in May 2019, and he fled the courtroom after the decision.

A settlement was later reached between Nashwa's family and the hospital management. According to the agreement, the hospital would establish a pediatric ICU named after Nashwa by May 31, 2020, and create a scholarship for one medical or dental student annually, with the family's approval. Additionally, the hospital pledged to allocate Rs5 million each year to a fund designed to offer free treatment to economically disadvantaged patients, with the family involved in the oversight process.
