= Parliament House, Islamabad =

Seat of the Parliament of Pakistan in Islamabad

Parliament House
- ایوانِ پارلیمان; Aiwān-e-Pārlemān
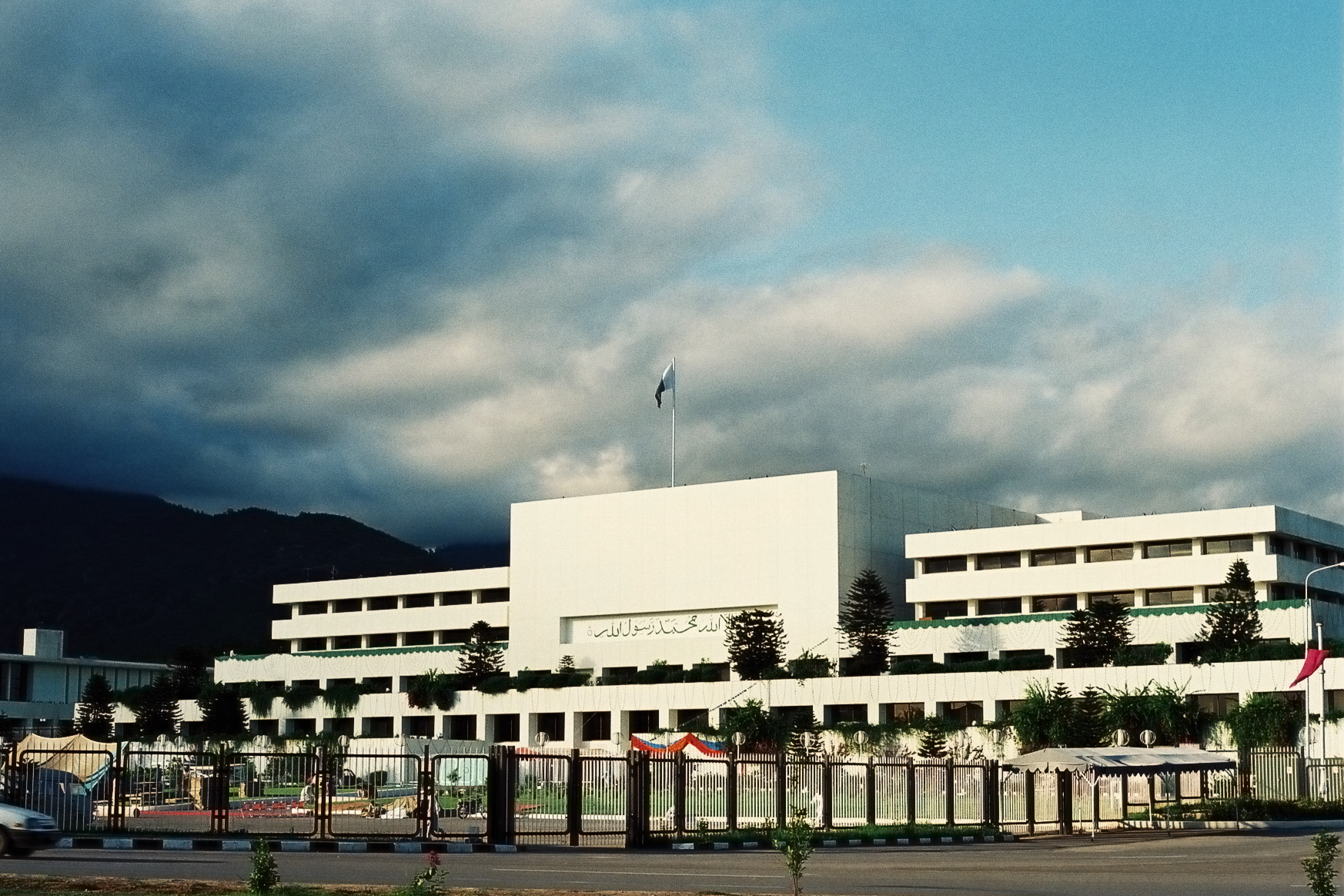
- A picture of the Parliament House of Pakistan

General information
- Type: Parliament building
- Location: Red Zone, Constitution Avenue, Islamabad, Pakistan
- Coordinates: 33.7301°N 73.0969°E
- Current tenants: Parliament of Pakistan
- Inaugurated: May 28, 1986; 40 years ago
- Owner: Government of Pakistan

Technical details
- Floor count: 5
- Floor area: 55556 m2

Design and construction
- Architect: Edward Durell Stone

Website
- senate.gov.pk na.gov.pk

The Parliament House (Urdu: ایوانِ پارلیمان, romanized: Aiwān-e-Pārlemān) in Red Zone, Islamabad is the seat of the Parliament of Pakistan, the supreme legislative body of the country. It houses the National Assembly and the Senate which, respectively, are the lower and upper houses in Pakistan's bicameral parliament.

== History ==
It was inaugurated in 1986 by then-President General Zia-ul-Haq and became the seat of Pakistan's federal legislature. The building was designed by American architect Edward Durell Stone. In 2018, the Senate Museum was inaugurated at Parliament House.
