= Asad Qasim =

Pakistani politician

- اسد قاسم

Member of the Senate of Pakistan
- Incumbent
- Assumed office 8 March 2025
- Preceded by: Qasim Roonjho
- Constituency: General seat from Balochistan, Pakistan

Personal details
- Party: PTI (2025-present)
- Parent: Qasim Roonjho (father)
- Occupation: Politician

Asad Qasim (Urdu: اسد قاسم) is a Pakistani politician from Balochistan who has been a member of the Senate of Pakistan since March 2025.

== Political career ==
Qasim was elected unopposed to the Senate of Pakistan as a Pakistan Tehreek-e-Insaf, candidate in a by-election on 6 March 2025 to replace Qasim Roonjho, his father. Roonjho had resigned on 22 October 2024 after voting in favour of the 26th amendment, defecting from the position of his party, Balochistan National Party (Mengal) (BNP-M). He took oath on 8 March 2025.
