= Ashraf Ali Jatoi =

Member of the Senate of Pakistan from Sindh province

- اشرف علی جتوئی

Member of the Senate of Pakistan
- Incumbent
- Assumed office 9 April 2024
- Constituency: Sindh

Personal details
- Party: PPP (2024-present)
- Relatives: Shahrukh Jatoi (brother)

Ashraf Ali Jatoi (Urdu: اشرف علی جتوئی) is a Pakistani businessman and politician who has been a member of the Senate of Pakistan since April 2024. Previously, he served as the chairman of Zeal-Pak Cement.

== Personal life ==
Ashraf Ali Jatoi was born into a feudal family. His family owns Sardar Mohammad Ashraf D. Baluch, a construction firm that works on the Government of Sindh-funded projects. His brother, Shahrukh Jatoi, is known for his involvement in the murder of Shahzeb Khan.

== Political career ==
Jatoi was elected from Sindh province during the 2024 Pakistani Senate election as a Pakistan People's Party Parliamentarians candidate on a general seat.
