= Nasir Butt =

Member of the Senate of Pakistan from Punjab province

- ناصر بٹ
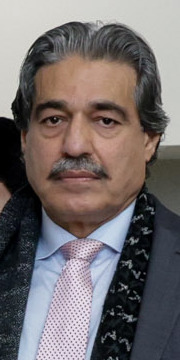

Member for the Senate of Pakistan
- Incumbent
- Assumed office 9 April 2024
- Constituency: Punjab, Pakistan

Personal details
- Party: PMLN (1995–present)

Nasir Mehmood Butt (Urdu: ناصر محمود بٹ) is a Pakistani politician who is member-elect for the Senate of Pakistan from Punjab.

== Political career ==
Butt was elected unopposed from Punjab province during the 2024 Pakistani Senate election as a Pakistan Muslim League (N) candidate.
