= Sana Jamali =

Pakistani politician

Senator Sana Jamali

Member of the Senate of Pakistan
- Incumbent
- Assumed office 12 March 2018

Personal details
- Parent: Jan Mohammad Jamali (father)

Sana Jamali is a Pakistani politician who has been a Member of the Senate of Pakistan, since March 2018.

== Political career ==
Jamali ran for the seat of the Senate of Pakistan as an independent candidate on a reserved seat for women from Balochistan in the 2015 Pakistani Senate election, but was unsuccessful.

Jamali was elected to the Senate as an independent candidate on reserved seat for women from Balochistan in the 2018 Pakistani Senate election. She took oath as Senator on 12 March 2018.
