= Qasim Roonjho =

Pakistani politician

Senator Qasim Roonjho

Member of the Senate of Pakistan
- In office March 2021 – 22 October 2024
- Constituency: Balochistan

Personal details
- Other political affiliations: BNP(M) (2021-2024)
- Children: Asad Qasim (son)

Muhammad Qasim Roonjho (Urdu: محمد قاسم رُونجہ) is a Pakistani politician who served as a member of the Senate of Pakistan from Balochistan from March 2021 to October 2024. He belongs to Balochistan National Party (Mengal).

== Political career ==
He contested a 2008 by-election from PB-22 Lasbela-I as an independent candidate, but was unsuccessful. He received 92 votes and was defeated by Peer Abdul Qaidr Al-Gillani, another independent candidate.

He contested the 2013 Pakistani general election from NA-270 (Awaran-cum-Lasbela) as a candidate of Balochistan National Party (Mengal) (BNP-M), but was unsuccessful. He received 3,593 votes and was defeated by Jam Kamal Khan, a candidate of Pakistan Muslim League (N) (PML(N)).

He was elected to the Senate of Pakistan in the 2021 Pakistani Senate election on a general seat from Balochistan as a candidate of Balochistan National Party (Mengal) (BNP-M).

On 21 October 2024, he defected from his party's position and voted in favour of the 26th amendment. On 22 October, he resigned from the Senate.
