= Deputy Chairman of the Senate of Pakistan =

Second highest authority of the upper house of the Parliament of Pakistan

Deputy chairman of the Senate of Pakistan
- Incumbent; Syedaal Khan Nasar since 9 April 2024
- Style: Mr. Deputy chairman
- Member of: Senate of Pakistan
- Seat: Islamabad
- Appointer: Members of the Senate of Pakistan
- Term length: 3 years
- Formation: Constitution of Pakistan (12 April 1973)

The Deputy Chairman of the Senate of Pakistan (Urdu: ڈپٹی چیئرمین سینیٹ) is the Deputy Chair of the Senate of Pakistan. According to the Constitution of Pakistan, the deputy chairman is the presiding official when the chairman is unavailable. The Senate must choose a chairman and deputy chairman for three-year terms. Syedaal Khan Nasar has served as the deputy chairman since 9 April 2024.

During the President's absence, the chairman senate is empowered with the duties of the presidency; in rare events involving the absence of the chairman, the presidential duties are usually held by Speaker National Assembly. The Chairman of the Senate is the second in the line of succession to the President of Pakistan, ahead of the Speaker National Assembly.

== Role and responsibilities ==
The office of Deputy Chairman of the Senate is created by Article 60(1) of the Chapter 2 in Part III of the Constitution of Pakistan:

After the Senate has been duly constituted, it shall, at its first meeting and to the exclusion of any other business, elect from amongst its members a chairman and a Deputy chairman and, so often as the office of chairman or Deputy chairman becomes vacant, the Senate shall elect another member as chairman or, as the case may be, Deputy chairman.

The term of office of the chairman or Deputy chairman shall be 3 years from the day on which he enters upon his office.

— Article 60(1)–60(2) of the Chapter 2 in Part III of the Constitution of Pakistan, source

== List of Deputy Chairmen of the Senate ==
- Waja Abdul Malik Baloch (Panjgur) (26 April 1977 – 4 July 1977)
- Sajjad Hussain Qureshi (21 March 1985 – 29 December 1985)
- Malik Muhammad Ali Khan (23 January 1986 – 20 March 1988)
- Sayed Muhammad Fazal Agha (21 March 1988 – 20 March 1991)
- Noor Jehan Panezai (21 March 1991 – 20 March 1994)
- Mir Abdul Jabbar Khan (21 March 1994 – 20 March 1997)
- Mir Humayun Khan Marri (21 March 1997 – 12 October 1999)
- Khalilur Rehman (12 March 2003 – 15 March 2005)
- Jan Mohammad Jamali (12 March 2006 – 11 March 2012)
- Sabir Ali Baloch (12 March 2012 – 12 March 2015)
- Abdul Ghafoor Haideri (12 March 2015 – 12 March 2018)
- Saleem Mandviwalla (12 March 2018 - 12 March 2021)
- Mirza Muhammad Afridi (12 March 2021 - 8 March 2024)
- Syedaal Khan Nasar (9 April 2024 - )

== See also ==
- Parliament of Pakistan

== Public domain sources ==
- Senate of Pakistan
