= Tahir Bizenjo =

Pakistani politician

Member of the Senate of Pakistan
- In office 12 March 2018 – 8 March 2024

Personal details
- Other political affiliations: National Party

Tahir Bizenjo is a Pakistani politician who has been a Member of the Senate of Pakistan, since March 2018.

== Political career ==
Bizenjo was elected to the Senate of Pakistan as a candidate of the National Party on a technocrat seat from Balochistan in the 2018 Pakistani Senate election. He took oath as Senator on 12 March 2018.
