= Dilawar Khan (politician) =

Pakistani politician

Member of the Senate of Pakistan
- Incumbent
- Assumed office 25 July 2025
- Constituency: Khyber Pakhtunkhwa
- In office 12 March 2018 – 12 March 2024
- Constituency: Khyber Pakhtunkhwa

Personal details
- Party: JUI (F) (2025-present)
- Other political affiliations: PMLN (2018-2025)

Dilawar Khan is a Pakistani politician who has been a Member of the Senate of Pakistan since March 2018.

== Political career ==
He was nominated by Pakistan Muslim League (N) (PML-N) as its candidate in the 2018 Pakistani Senate election. However the Election Commission of Pakistan declared all PML-N candidates for the Senate election as independent after a ruling of the Supreme Court of Pakistan.

Khan was elected to the Senate of Pakistan as an independent candidate on Technocrat seat from Khyber Pakhtunkhwa in Senate election. He was backed in the election by PML-N and joined the treasury benches, led by PML-N after getting elected. He took oath as Senator on 12 March 2018.

== See also ==
- Atta ul Haq Darvish
