= Atta ul Haq Darvish =

Pakistani politician

- عطاء الحق درویش

Member of the Senate of Pakistan
- Incumbent
- Assumed office 28 July 2025
- Constituency: Khyber Pakhtunkhwa

General Secretary, JUI (F) Khyber Pakhtunkhwa
- Incumbent
- Assumed office September 2024

Personal details
- Party: JUI (F) (2025-present)
- Profession: Islamic scholar, politician

Maulana Atta ul Haq Darvish is a Pakistani Islamic scholar and politician, who is the general secretary of Jamiat Ulema-e-Islam (F)'s Khyber Pakhtunkhwa chapter since September 2024. and has also been serving as a senator in the Senate of Pakistan since July 2025.

== See also ==
- Dilawar Khan (politician)
