= Khalil Tahir Sandhu =

Pakistani politician (born 1967)

Member of the Provincial Assembly of the Punjab
- In office 2008 – 31 May 2018
- Constituency: reserved seat for minorities

Member of the Senate of Pakistan
- Incumbent
- Assumed office April 2024

Personal details
- Born: 23 May 1967 (age 59) Toba Tek Singh, Punjab, Pakistan
- Party: PMLN (2008-present)

Khalil Tahir Sandhu is a Pakistani politician who was a Member of the Provincial Assembly of the Punjab from 2008 to May 2018.

== Early life and education ==
He was born on 23 May 1967 in Toba Tek Singh.

He graduated from Government College University, Faisalabad in 1987. He received the degree of Bachelor of Education from Government Education College, Faisalabad in 1989 and the degree of Bachelor of Laws from Punjab University Law College in 1994.

== Political career ==
He was elected to the Provincial Assembly of the Punjab as a candidate of Pakistan Muslim League (N) (PML-N) on reserved seat for minorities in the 2008 Pakistani general election. He served as Parliamentary Secretary for Human Rights and Minorities Affairs from 2008 to 2013.

He was re-elected to the Provincial Assembly of the Punjab as a candidate of PML-N on reserved seat for minorities in the 2013 Pakistani general election. In June 2013, he was inducted into the provincial cabinet of Chief Minister Shahbaz Sharif and was made Provincial Minister of Punjab for human rights and minorities with additional portfolio of health. He remained Minister for health until November 2013.
