= Mohammad Abdul Qadir =

Pakistani politician

Member of the Senate of Pakistan
- Incumbent
- Assumed office March 2021
- Constituency: Balochistan

Personal details
- Party: BAP (2023-present)
- Other political affiliations: PTI (2021-2023)

Mohammad Abdul Qadir (Urdu: محمد عبدالقادر) is a Pakistani politician who is currently serving as a member of the Senate of Pakistan from the Balochistan since March 2021. He won Independently and later joined Pakistan Tehreek-e-Insaf.
