= Quratulain Marri =

Pakistani politician

Member of the Senate of Pakistan
- Incumbent
- Assumed office 12 March 2018

Personal details
- Party: PPP (2018-present)

Quratulain Marri is a Pakistani politician who has been a Member of the Senate of Pakistan, since March 2018.

== Political career ==
Marri was elected to the Senate of Pakistan as a candidate of Pakistan Peoples Party on reserved seat for women from Sindh in the 2018 Pakistani Senate election. She took oath as Senator on 12 March 2018.
