= Ahmed Khan Andarh Khilji =

Pakistani politician

Senate of Pakistan
- Incumbent
- Assumed office 9 April 2024
- Constituency: Balochistan
- In office 12 March 2018 – 12 March 2024
- Constituency: Balochistan

Personal details
- Party: PMLN (2025-present)
- Other political affiliations: JUI (F) (2025-2025); IND (2018-2025)
- Website: www.senate.gov.pk/en/profile.php?uid=920

Ahmed Khan Andarh Khilji is a Pakistani politician who has been a member of the Senate of Pakistan, since March 2018.

== Political career ==
Khan was elected to the Senate of Pakistan as an independent candidate on general seat from Balochistan in the 2018 Pakistani Senate election. He took oath as Senator on 12 March 2018.

He was expelled from the JUI after voting in favor of the 27th Amendment for deviating from party policy.
