= Agha Shahzaib Durrani =

Pakistani politician

- آغا شاہزیب درانی

Member of the Senate of Pakistan
- Incumbent
- Assumed office 29 April 2024
- Constituency: Punjab
- In office 28 July 2021 – 8 February 2024
- Constituency: Punjab
- In office 28 July 2017 – 28 July 2020
- Constituency: Punjab

Personal details
- Party: PMLN (2017-present)

Agha Shahzaib Durrani (Urdu: آغا شاہزیب درانی) is a Pakistani politician who has been a member of Senate of Pakistan since July 2017.

== Political career ==
He was elected to the Senate of Pakistan as a candidate of Pakistan Muslim League (N) on a seat reserved for technocrats from Balochistan in July 2017, replacing Agha Shahbaz Khan Durrani.
