= Rubina Naz =

Member of the Senate of Pakistan from Khyber Pakhtunkhwa province

- روبینہ ناز

Member-elect for the Senate of Pakistan
- Incumbent
- Assumed office 27 July 2025
- Constituency: Khyber Pakhtunkhwa

Personal details
- Party: PTI (2025-present)

Rubina Naz (Urdu: روبینہ ناز) is a Pakistani politician who is a senator-elect for the Senate of Pakistan from the Khyber Pakhtunkhwa province.

== Political career ==
On 21 July 2025, Naz was elected as a senator from the Khyber Pakhtunkhwa province on a seat reserved for women, as a Pakistan Tehreek-e-Insaf candidate.
