= Bushra Anjum Butt =

Pakistani politician

Member of the Provincial Assembly of the Punjab
- In office 29 May 2013 – 31 May 2018
- Constituency: Reserved seat for women

Member of the Senate of Pakistan
- Incumbent
- Assumed office 2024

Personal details
- Born: 17 July 1981 (age 45) Lahore, Punjab, Pakistan
- Party: PMLN (2013-present)

Bushra Anjum Butt (Urdu: ‌‍بشریَ انجم بٹ; born 17 July 1981) is a Pakistani politician who was a Member of the Provincial Assembly of the Punjab, from July 2013 to May 2018.

== Early life and education ==
She was born on 17 July 1981 in Lahore. In 2009, she earned a Master of Arts degree in English from Kinnaird College for Women University.

== Political career ==
She was elected to the Provincial Assembly of the Punjab as a candidate of Pakistan Muslim League (N) (PML-N) on a reserved seat for women in July 2013.

She was re-elected to the Provincial Assembly of the Punjab as a candidate of PML-N on a reserved seat for women in the 2018 Pakistani general election.
