= Rubina Qaimkhani =

Pakistani politician

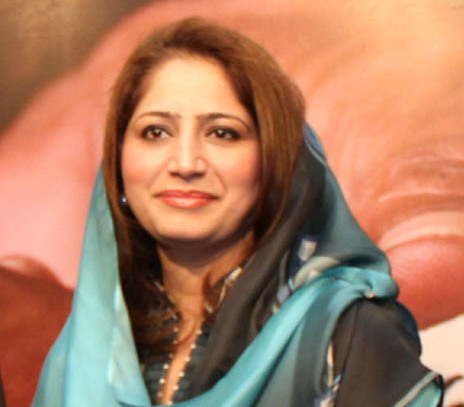

Member of the Provincial Assembly of Sindh
- In office June 2013 – 28 May 2018
- Constituency: Reserved Seat for women

Member of the National Assembly of Pakistan
- In office 2002–2013
- Constituency: Reserved Seat for women

Member of the Senate of Pakistan
- Incumbent
- Assumed office 2024

Personal details
- Born: 5 January 1975 (age 51)
- Party: PPP (2002-present)

Rubina Saadat Qaimkhani (Urdu: روبینہ سعادت قائم خان) is a Pakistani politician, born 5 January 1975. She had been a member of the Provincial Assembly of Sindh from June 2013 to May 2018. Previously, she had been a member of the National Assembly of Pakistan from 2002 to 2013.

== Political career ==
She was elected to the National Assembly of Pakistan as a candidate of Pakistan Peoples Party (PPP) on a seat reserved for women from Sindh in the 2002 Pakistani general election.

She was re-elected to the National Assembly of Pakistan as a candidate of PPP on a seat reserved for women from Sindh in the 2008 Pakistani general election. She served as federal parliamentary secretary for human rights during her second tenure as Member of the National Assembly.

She was elected to the Provincial Assembly of Sindh as a candidate of PPP on a seat reserved for women in the 2013 Pakistani general election. On 10 July 2013, she was inducted into the provincial Sindh cabinet of Chief Minister Syed Qaim Ali Shah and was appointed as Provincial Minister of Sindh for Population Welfare with the additional ministerial portfolios of Women Development, and Special Education. In May 2014, her ministerial portfolio of social welfare was removed.

In March 2015, she was removed from the cabinet.

== Family ==
In March 2014, she filed for khula. In April 2014, the court dissolved the marriage.

In March 2018, her only son died in a car accident.
