= Abdul Ghafoor Haideri =

Pakistani politician

- مولانا عبد غفور حیدری
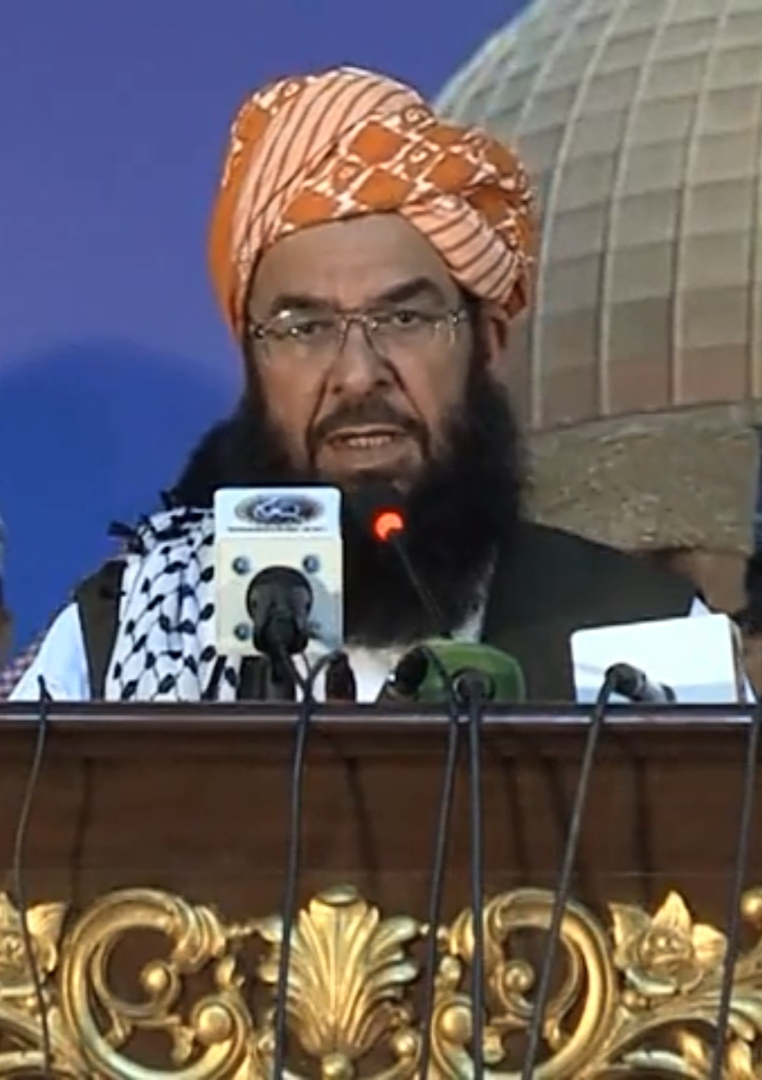
- Haideri in 2017

Ministry of Postal Services (Pakistan)
- In office 16 January 2014 – 11 March 2015
- President: Mamnoon Hussain
- Prime Minister: Nawaz Sharif

General Secretary of JUI (F)
- Incumbent
- Assumed office 1995

Member of the Senate of Pakistan
- In office 2008–2024

Deputy Chairman of the Senate of Pakistan
- In office 12 March 2015 – 12 March 2018
- Preceded by: Sabir Ali Baloch
- Succeeded by: Saleem Mandviwalla

Member of the National Assembly of Pakistan
- Incumbent
- Assumed office 29 February 2024
- Constituency: NA-261 Surab-cum-Kalat-cum-Mastung
- In office 29 September 2002 – 11 October 2007
- Constituency: NA-268 (Kalat Mastung)
- In office 18 October 1993 – 5 November 1996
- Constituency: NA-204 (Kalat cum Kharan)

Member of the Provincial Assembly of Balochistan
- In office 6 November 1990 – 18 July 1993
- Constituency: PB-28 (Kalat-II)

Personal details
- Born: 5 June 1957 (age 68) Gazag, Kalat District, Balochistan, Pakistan
- Party: JUI (F) (1983-present)

Abdul Ghafoor Haideri (Urdu: مولانا عبد غفور حیدری; born c. 1957) is a Pakistani Islamic scholar and politician. He has served as the Deputy Chairman of the Senate of Pakistan since 12 March 2015 and has been the central General Secretary of the Jamiat Ulama-e-Islam party since 1995.

== Early life and education ==
Haideri was born in June 1957 to Muhammad Azam Lehri and received his early education in his village located in the Kalat District of Balochistan.

In 1979, he completed his religious education and passed examinations from the Examination Board of Wafaq-ul-Madaris Al-Arabia.

In 1984, he opened the Jamia Shah Wali Ullah school in Kalat, teaching there from 1985 to 1990.

== Political career ==
Haideri was active in Tehrik-e-Khatm-e-Nabowat in 1974 and Tehreek Nizam-e-Mustafa in 1977, for which police twice imprisoned him.

In 1983, he was elected General Secretary of the Jamiat Ulema-e-Islam (F) party in Quetta district. He got himself arrested a third time on 14 August 1983 in Manan square in Quetta during the Movement for the Restoration of Democracy's campaign to 'Fill the Prisons' and destabilize President Zia ul-Haq's government. The military sentenced him to ten lashes and one year in Sibi prison.

He was elected to the Provincial Assembly of Balochistan in the 1990 Pakistani general election and served as a provincial minister of Balochistan.

He ran for the Chief Minister of Balochistan in the 1992 Pakistani general election but lost by one vote.

In the 1993 Pakistani general election, he was elected to the National Assembly of Pakistan from Qalat constituency.

In 2001, Haideri campaigned against Pakistan's cooperation with the US government's "war on terror", touring the country and earning his fourth arrest, this time on seven counts of mutiny. He spent five months in jail in Quetta before winning another election to the National Assembly.

In 2015, he was elected to the Senate of Pakistan.

In 2021, was elected for senate again, and nominated for deputy chairman of senate by PDM, but eventually lost to Mirza Afridi.

He was elected to the National Assembly in the 2024 general elections, after defeating sardar Akhtar Mengal.

== Counter-terrorism ==
In 2013, he became the Minister of State for Postal Services. "Speaking at a press conference here on Tuesday, Maulana Haideri, who is Minister of State for Postal Services, condemned the terrorist attack on a school in Peshawar and said the state had no right to suspend the death penalty. JUI-F General Secretary Maulana Abdul Ghafoor Haideri has said that a moratorium on death penalty is encouraging terrorists and has limited counter-terrorism action in the country." Abdul Ghafoor Haideri maintains, "Only a victim's kin has the right to pardon the killer with or without taking compensation. This is an Islamic way of justice and being an ideological state, Pakistan should have Islamic laws."

In March 2015, he won a seat in the Senate and later took oath as deputy chairman senate. He is expected to serve in that capacity till March 2021.

In February 2017, Haideri was refused a visa by US authorities. He was scheduled to head a two-member delegation to an Inter Parliamentary Union meeting at the United Nations in New York.

On 12 May 2017, he managed to escape an ISIL bombing shortly after the end of Friday prayers near the town of Mastung that targeted him; he was lightly wounded by pieces of glass from the windscreen of his car.

== See also ==
- List of Deobandis

Political offices
| Preceded by Sabir Ali Baloch | Deputy Chairman of the Senate; 2015–2018 | Succeeded by Saleem Mandviwalla |
