= Syed Ali Zafar =

Pakistani politician

Member of the Senate of Pakistan
- Incumbent
- Assumed office March 2021
- President: Arif Alvi; Asif Ali Zardari
- Prime Minister: Imran Khan; Shehbaz Sharif; Anwaar ul Haq Kakar; Shehbaz Sharif

Federal Minister for Law and Justice
- Caretaker
- In office 5 June 2018 – 15 August 2018
- President: Mamnoon Hussain
- Prime Minister: Nasirul Mulk
- Preceded by: Chaudhry Mehmood Bashir
- Succeeded by: Farogh Naseem

President Supreme Court of Pakistan
- In office 2015–2016

Personal details
- Born: Lahore, Punjab, Pakistan
- Party: PTI (2019-present)

Syed Ali Zafar (Urdu: علی ظفر) is a Pakistani barrister and, since 2021, a senator representing Punjab as a member of the Pakistan Tehreek-e-Insaf (PTI).

== Work ==
Zafar joined the PTI in 2019. He was appointed caretaker Minister of Law and Justice for the 2018 general election in the cabinet of caretaker Prime Minister Nasirul Mulk.

He formerly served as the President of the Supreme Court Bar Association of Pakistan. He is a columnist for The Express Tribune on political, social, and legal issues.

== See also ==
- Supreme Court Bar Association of Pakistan
- Lahore High Court Bar Association
- S.M. Zafar
