= Syedaal Khan Nasar =

Member of the Senate of Pakistan from Balochistan province

- سیدال خان ناصر

Deputy Chairman of the Senate of Pakistan
- Incumbent
- Assumed office 9 April 2024
- Chairman of the Senate of Pakistan: Yusuf Raza Gilani
- Preceded by: Mirza Muhammad Afridi

Member of the Senate of Pakistan
- Incumbent
- Assumed office April 2024
- Constituency: General seat from Balochistan, Pakistan

Personal details
- Party: PMLN (2024-present)

Sardar Syedaal Khan Nasar (Urdu: سردار سیدال خان ناصر) is a Pakistani politician who is senator-elect for the Senate of Pakistan from Balochistan province. He is serving as deputy chairman of senate since 9 April 2024.

== Political career ==
Nasar was elected from Balochistan province during the 2024 Pakistani Senate election as a Pakistan Muslim League (N) candidate on a general seat. On 9 April 2024, he was elected deputy chairman of senate unopposed.
