= Mirza Muhammad Afridi =

Pakistani politician

Member of the Senate of Pakistan
- Incumbent
- Assumed office 12 March 2018

Personal details
- Party: PTI (2021-present)
- Other political affiliations: PMLN (2018-2021)
- Relations: Ayub Afridi (cousin)

Mirza Muhammad Afridi is a Pakistani politician who has been a Member of the Senate of Pakistan, since March 2018.He served as deputy chairman senate of Pakistan from March 2021 to March 2024.

== Political career ==
Afridi was elected to the Senate of Pakistan as an independent candidate on general seat from FATA in the 2018 Pakistani Senate election. He announced to join Pakistan Muslim League (N) (PML-N) after getting elected. He took oath as Senator on 12 March 2018. He joined the treasury benches, led by PML-N after getting elected.
