= Pakistan Peoples Party Parliamentarians =

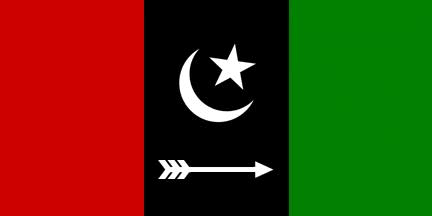
- President: Asif Ali Zardari
- Secretary-General: Nayyar Hussain Bukhari
- Spokesperson: Shazia Marri
- Founder: Ameen Faheem
- Founded: 2002
- Headquarters: Lahore, Punjab, Pakistan
- National affiliation: Pakistan People's Party

Election symbol
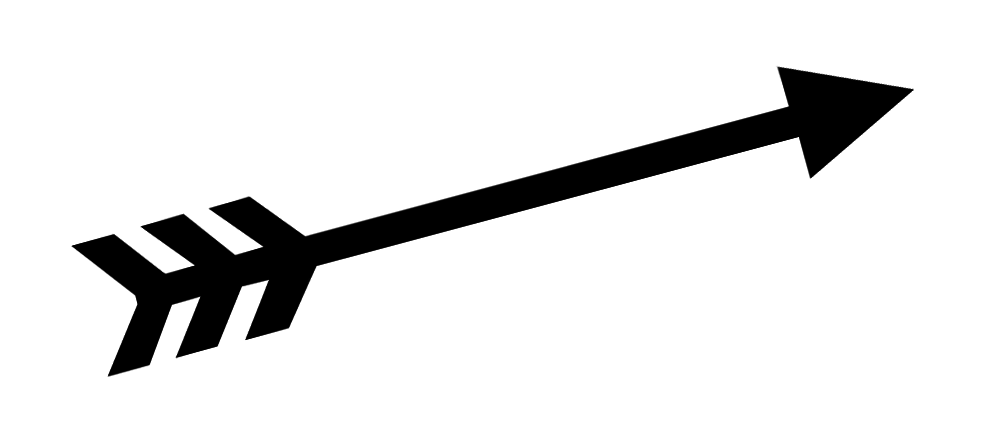
- Arrow Arrow

Website
- Official website

The Pakistan Peoples Party Parliamentarians (PPPP) is a Pakistani political party and an electoral extension of the Pakistan Peoples Party (PPP). It was created in 2002 by Amin Fahim after Pervez Musharraf's government imposed restrictions on the PPP and its chairperson Benazir Bhutto to participate in Pakistani politics.

In January 2017, Asif Ali Zardari was elected as the President of PPPP.

== See also ==
- Pakistan Peoples Party
