= Senate of Pakistan =

Upper house of the Parliament of Pakistan

Senate of Pakistan سینیٹ پاکستان Sêniṭ Pākistān
- List of senators of Pakistan
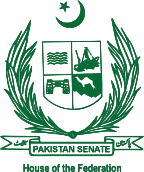

Type
- Type: Upper house of the Parliament of Pakistan
- Term limits: 6 years

History
- Founded: 1973; 53 years ago

Leadership
- Chairman: Yusuf Raza Gillani, PPP since 9 April 2024
- Deputy Chairman: Syedaal Khan Nasar, PMLN since 9 April 2024
- Leader of the House: Ishaq Dar, PMLN since 9 April 2024
- Leader of the Opposition: Raja Nasir Abbas Jafri, MWM since 19 January 2026

Structure
- Seats: 96
- Political groups: Government (65): PPP (26); PMLN (20); BAP (4); MQM-P (3); ANP (3); NP (1); PML(Q) (1); Independent (7); Opposition (30): PTI (14); JUI (F) (7); MWM (1); SIC (1); Independent (7); Vacant (1)

Elections
- Voting system: Indirect single transferable vote
- Last election: 2 April 2024 (37 seats)
- Next election: 2027 (48 seats)

Meeting place
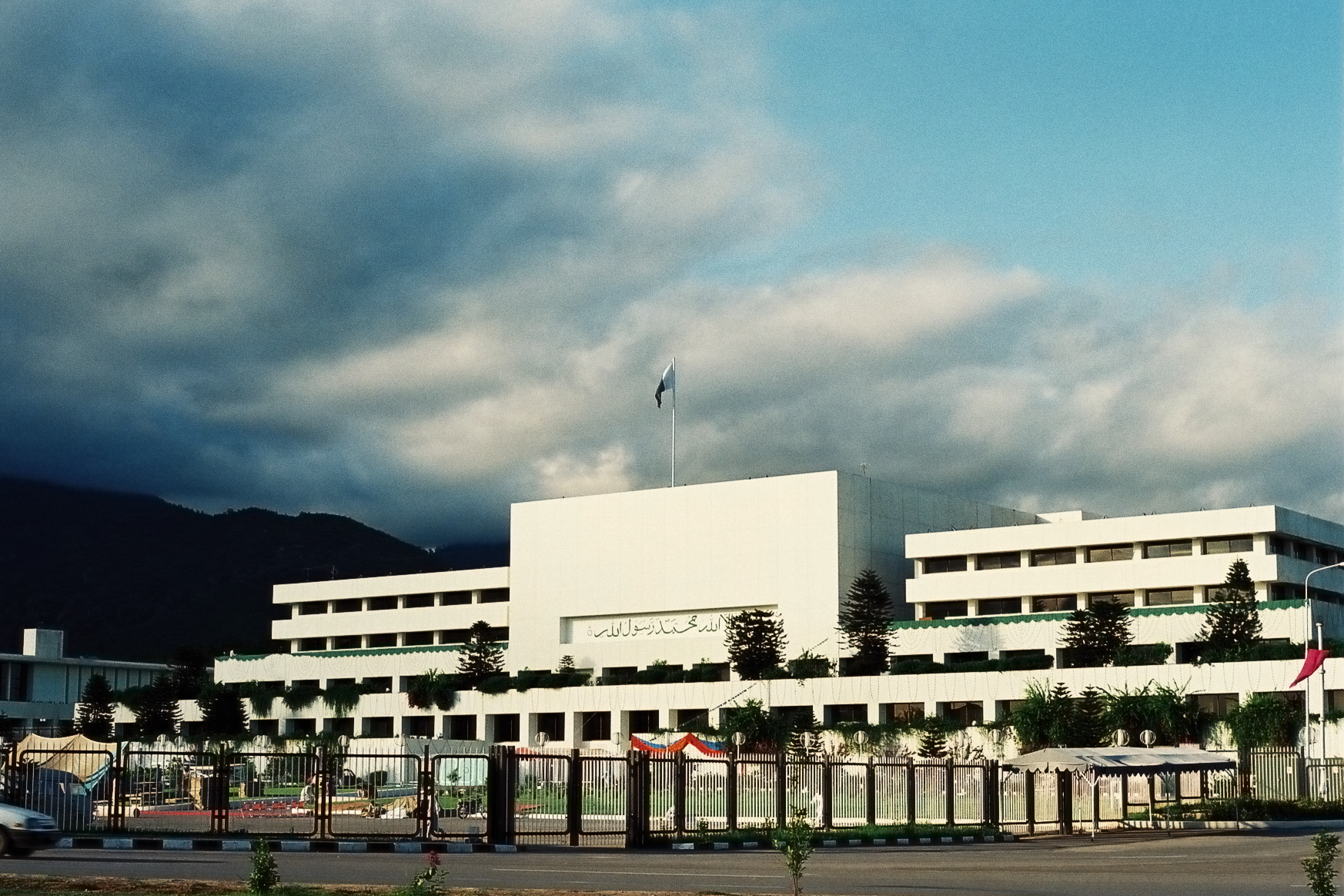
- Senate Secretariat; Parliament House; Red Zone, Islamabad

Website
- Official website

Constitution
- Constitution of Pakistan

The Senate of Pakistan, (Note: Urdu: سینیٹ, romanized: Sêniṭ, pronounced [sɛˈnɪʈ]) constitutionally the House of the Federation, (Note: Urdu: ایوانِ وفاق, romanized: Aiwān-ē-Vifāq, pronounced [ɛːʋɑːn-eː ʋɪˈfɑːq]) is the upper house (Note: Urdu: ایوانِ بالا, romanized: Aiwān-ē-Bālā, pronounced [ɛːʋɑːn-eː bɑːlɑ]) of the bicameral Parliament of Pakistan, with the National Assembly being the lower house. It functions as the institutional representative of the Pakistani federating units at the national level. With a maximum membership of 96, provincial legislatures elect 23 each using single transferable vote; while four represent the federal capital. Members, referred to as 'senators', sit for six-year terms, with half of the house up for election every three years. Unlike the National Assembly, the Senate is a continuing chamber and hence not subject to dissolution.

Established and first convened in 1973 under Article 59 of the new constitution, the Senate turned the country's parliament into a bicameral legislature — which up till this point had been unicameral, consisting only of the National Assembly. Providing equal representation to all four provinces of the country, it is an indirectly elected body where each province sends 23 senators elected by their respective provincial assemblies; while four sit to represent the Islamabad Capital Territory, who are elected by a special electoral college consisting of all three members of the National Assembly representing Islamabad.

All senators serve six-year terms, and half of the body goes up for election every three years; due to this, the first Senate elected in 1973 filled half of the house with the rest being filled by an election in 1976. Under the constitution, the Senate can never be dissolved and is a 'continuing chamber' unlike the National Assembly, which can be dissolved by the president upon the prime minister's advice. The legislature convenes at the Senate Secretariat, located in the east wing of the Parliament House in Islamabad; while the National Assembly convenes in the west wing of the same building.

The Senate shares its legislative powers with the National Assembly and may introduce and pass legislative bills, which requires approval by both houses. It exercises oversight over the federal government through its parliamentary motions and committees. The Senate also has constitutional roles in matters such as ordinances, emergency proclamations, and the removal or impeachment of the President.

== History ==
After Independence, the first Constituent Assembly of Pakistan, elected in December 1947 after partition, was assigned the task of framing the Constitution of Pakistan. This Assembly passed the Objectives Resolution on 12 March 1949, laying down principles which later became a substantive part of the Constitution of Pakistan. However, before it could accomplish the task of framing the constitution, it was dissolved in October 1954. Thereafter, the Governor General, convened the Second Constituent Assembly in May 1955, which framed and passed the first Constitution of Pakistan on 29 February 1956. That Constitution was promulgated on 23 March 1956, which provided for a parliamentary form of Government with a unicameral legislature. Hence, from 14 August 1947 to 1 March 1956, the Government of India Act 1935 was retained as the Constitution of Pakistan.

On October 7, 1958, Martial Law was promulgated and the Constitution abrogated. The Military Government appointed a Constitution Commission in February 1960 which framed the 1962 Constitution. That Constitution provided for a Presidential form of Government with a unicameral legislature. The 1962 Constitution was abrogated on 25 March 1969. The Civil Government, which came to power in December 1971 pursuant to 1970 elections, gave the nation an interim Constitution in the year 1972.

The 1970 Assembly framed the 1973 Constitution, which was unanimously passed on 12 April and promulgated on 14 August 1973. The 1973 Constitution provides for a parliamentary form of Government with a bicameral legislature, comprising the National Assembly and the Senate.

The membership of the Senate, which was originally 45, was raised to 63 in 1977 and to 87 in 1985. The government of Gen. Pervez Musharraf raised the membership of the Senate from 87 to 100 through the Legal Framework Order (LFO), 2002, enforced on 21 August 2002 and the government of Asif Ali Zardari raised the membership of the Senate from 100 to 104 through the 18th amendment in 2011 (four minority members from four provinces). After the Twenty-Fifth Amendment, the number of seats in the Senate was reduced to 96, as the seats for FATA were removed after its merger with KPK.

== Purpose and role ==
The main purpose for the creation of the Senate of Pakistan was to give equal representation to all the federating units since the membership of the National Assembly was based on the population of each province. Equal provincial membership in the Senate, thus, balances the provincial inequality in the National Assembly.

There are ninety six senatorial seats including eighteen women Senators; the Constitution requires at least seventeen women Senators. Members of the Senate are elected according to Article 59 of the Constitution.

=== President and Parliament ===
Under Article 50 of the Constitution, the Majlis-i-Shoora (Parliament) of Pakistan consists of the President and two Houses, to be known respectively as the National Assembly and the Senate. The President is elected by members of both Houses of the Parliament and the Provincial Assemblies. The President may be removed from office or impeached through a resolution, passed by not less than two-thirds of the total membership of the Parliament in a joint sitting of the two Houses, convened for the purpose. In the event that the office of the President becomes vacant, the Chairman of the Senate acts as President till such time that the position may be filled through a by election. This also occurs when the President, by reason of absence or any other incapacity, is unable to effectively exercise their office.

=== Relations between the Houses ===
Unless both the Houses pass a Bill, and it receives the President's assent it cannot become a law including in the case of a money bill which is the sole prerogative of the National Assembly. Through an amendment, the role of a Mediation Committee, composed of eight members of each House, has been introduced to evolve consensus on Bills, in case there is a disagreement between the two houses

=== Cabinet ===
The Constitution provides that there shall be a Cabinet headed by the Prime Minister, which is collectively responsible to the National Assembly. The Prime Minister is chosen from the National Assembly. The Federal Ministers and Ministers of State are appointed from among the members of Parliament. However, the number of Federal Ministers and Ministers of State who are members of Senate, shall not at any time, exceed one fourth of the numbers of Federal Ministers.

== Tenures of senates ==
No.	Term start	Term end
1	1973	1975
2	1975	1977
3	1985	1988
4	1988	1991
5	1991	1994
6	1994	1997
7	1997	2000
8	2003	2006
9	2003	2009
10	2006	2012
11	2009	2015
12	2012	2018
13	2015	2021
14	2018	2024
15	2021	2027
16	2024	2030
17	2027	2033

== Composition ==
Province/Territory	General seats	Technocrats/Ulema	Women	Non-Muslim	Total
Balochistan	14	4	4	1	23
Khyber Pakhtunkhwa	14	4	4	1	23
Sindh	14	4	4	1	23
Punjab	14	4	4	1	23
Islamabad Capital Territory	2	1	1	-	4
Total	58	17	17	4	96

- FATA merged with Khyber Pakhtunkhwa through 25th amendment. The amendment reduces the members in Senate from 104 to 100 in 2021 and ultimately to 96 in 2024. Current members representing FATA will continue to serve till 2024 (half retired in 2021). After 2024, FATA will have no separate Senators.
- Four seats for non-Muslims increased through the Constitution (Eighteenth Amendment) Act, 2010 (Act No. X of 2010).

=== Appointment ===
(1) The Senate shall consist of 96 members, of whom:

(a) 14 shall be elected by the members of each Provincial Assembly;
(c) two on general seats, and one woman and one technocrat including Aalim shall be elected from the Federal Capital in such manner as the President may, by Order, and by law prescribe;
(d) four women shall be elected by the members of each Provincial Assembly;
(e) four technocrats including ulema shall be elected by the members of each Provincial Assembly.
(f) one seat in the senate is reserved for minorities in each province."

(2) Election to fill seats in the Senate allocated to each Province shall be held in accordance with the system of proportional representation by means of the single transferable vote.

(3) The Senate shall not be subject to dissolution but the term of its members of parliaments, who shall retire as follows, shall be six years:-

(a) of the members referred to in paragraph (a) of clause (1), seven shall retire after the expiration of the first three years and seven shall retire after the expiration of the next three years.

(b) of the members referred to in paragraph (c) of the aforesaid clause,-

(i) one elected on general seat shall retire after the expiration of the first three years and the other one shall retire after the expiration of the next three years, and
(ii) one elected on the seat reserved for technocrat shall retire after first three years and the one elected on the seat reserved for woman shall retire after the expiration of the next three years;

(c) of the members referred to in paragraph (d) of the aforesaid clause, two shall retire after the expiration of the three years and two shall retire after the expiration of the next three years; and
(d) of the members referred to in paragraph (e) of the aforesaid clause, two shall retire after the expiration of the first three years and two shall retire after the expiration of the next three years: Provided that the term of office of a person elected to fill a casual vacancy shall be the unexpired term of the member whose vacancy he has filled.

== See also ==
- Chairman of the Senate of Pakistan
- List of senators of Pakistan
- Member of Senate of Pakistan
- List of committees of the Senate of Pakistan
- National Assembly of Pakistan
- Government of Pakistan
