= Punjab University Law College =

Pakistani Law College in Punjab

- یونیورسٹی لاء کالج
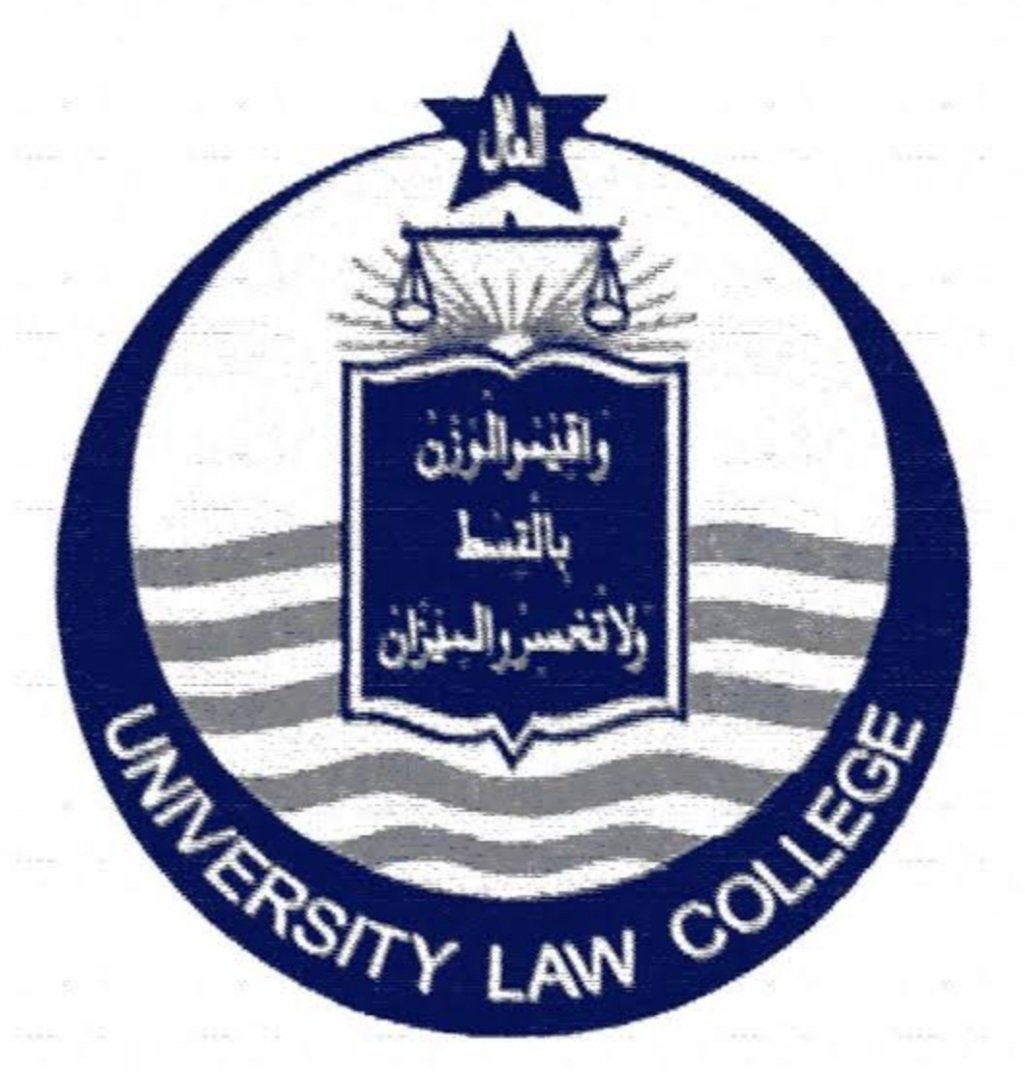
- Other name: PULC
- Former name: University Law College
- Type: Public
- Established: 1868 (155 years old)
- Founder: Anjuman e Punjab
- Parent institution: University of the Punjab
- Affiliations: • Pakistan Bar Council(PBC) • Higher Education Commission(HEC) • Association of Commonwealth Universities(ACU)
- Chancellor: Muhammad Baligh Ur Rehman
- Vice-Chancellor: Dr. Muhammad Ali Shah
- Principal: Dr. Aman Ullah Malik
- Dean: Dr. Shazia Qureshi
- Location: Canal Bank Rd, PU - Quaid-i-Azam Campus, Lahore, Punjab, Pakistan
- Colors: Blue & White
- Mascot: PULCians
- Website: www.pulc.edu.pk
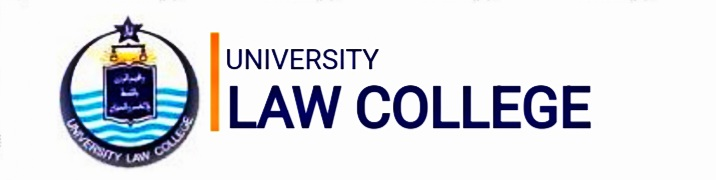

Punjab University Law College (PULC) is a public sector law school of the University of the Punjab, located at the Quaid-e-Azam Campus, Lahore. Established in 1868, it is the oldest law institution in Pakistan, predating the founding of the Punjab University itself by 14 years. It was the first institution to offer legal education in a Muslim-majority area of the Indian subcontinent. The college has produced prominent lawyers, activists, statesmen, judges, bureaucrats, and politicians. It is recognised for its historical significance, academic standards, and notable alumni.

Founded in 1868 under the auspices of the literary society Anjuman-e-Punjab, the college became a constituent institution of the University of the Punjab in 1870.

== History ==
=== Anjuman-i-Punjab (1865) ===
The University Law College was established by the Anjuman-i-Punjab in 1868. The Anjuman-i-Punjab was a literary society founded in Lahore on 21 January 1865 by Dr Gottlieb Wilhelm Leitner, a British linguist and orientalist. Leitner later became the first registrar of the University of the Punjab.

The society aimed to promote vernacular literature and held meetings for literary, social, and scientific advancement. It was also instrumental in the establishment of Oriental College and the University Law College, both of which were incorporated into Punjab University College, now known as the University of the Punjab.

=== Pre-partition (1868–1947) ===
The college's original course of study was two years in duration and was offered in both English and the vernacular. No examinations were conducted at the time, as admission to the practice of law was regulated solely through examinations administered by the Punjab Chief Court.

In 1873, the court's rules were amended to require candidates for the bar to have passed university entrance examinations, following which the college introduced its own examinations. In 1887, it was made compulsory for students to pass the intermediate examination and to maintain at least three-fourths attendance at the law college in order to sit for the Law/Bar examinations. In 1890, the Government of India introduced new regulations, empowering the college to confer the degrees of LL.B. and LL.D.. To sit for the LL.B. examinations and obtain a licence to practise law, students were required to have passed the intermediate examination and graduated in any arts discipline.

In 1935, the duration of the LL.B. programme was extended from two years to three. However, following partition, the regulations were revised once more, and on the directions of the Government of Pakistan and the Supreme Court of Pakistan, the programme was reduced back to two years.

=== Post-partition ===
In 1948, the LL.B. degree programme was of two years' duration. In 1964, however, under the directions of the High Court of West Pakistan, the LL.B. professional degree was extended to three years. In the same year, the college began offering two parallel law courses: B.L. (Bachelor of Law), a two-year degree, and LL.B. (Legum Baccalaureus), the traditional three-year degree.

In 1966, the B.L. degree was discontinued, and the LL.B. degree was reverted to a two-year programme. However, in 1992–1993, the three-year LL.B. programme was reintroduced, this time following the pattern of the United Kingdom's common law system.

=== College campus ===
The main building of the college was initially located on Katchery Road, at what is now known as the Allama Iqbal Campus (Old Campus), near Oriental College and Government College, Lahore.

In 1978, due to a shortage of space and to accommodate the expansion of the college, it was relocated to its present premises at the Quaid-e-Azam Campus (New Campus), along with the Hailey College of Commerce and other major departments.

=== Current standing ===
Today, the University Law College is regarded as one of the highest-ranked law institutes in Pakistan. The merit requirements are very high, while the acceptance rate is low. Due to its relatively low fees and extensive student facilities, it is a preferred choice for law aspirants in the country.

Although the LL.B. degree was initially three years in duration, it was extended to five years in 2016 under the Pakistan Bar Council Legal Education Rules, 2015. The three-year LL.B. was transformed into an integrated five-year B.A. LL.B. programme. This change aimed to regulate the increasing number of lawyers in Pakistan and provide professional legal education to students.

As of 2013, the college had approximately 1,600 students. It currently offers B.A. LL.B. (five-year) in the annual system and B.A. LL.B. (Hons) in the semester system, with a total of 200 seats—100 on merit and 100 for self-finance.

== Programmes ==
=== B.A. LL.B. ===
The B.A. LL.B. programme is a five-year integrated degree combining Bachelor of Arts and LL.B. studies. The programme is divided into two phases: 1) the B.A. phase and 2) the LL.B. phase.

During the first two years, students study foundational B.A. subjects such as Political Science, Sociology, Pakistan History, Islamic studies, English, and introductory legal subjects. In the subsequent three years, the curriculum focuses on specialised law-related subjects, including Civil Law, Criminal Procedure Code (CPC/CrPC), Cyber Law, Corporate Law, Company Law, Constitutional Law (covering the Pakistani, United States, and British constitutions), Environmental Law, Property Law, Law of Equity, and Law of Torts, among others.

=== LL.M. ===
From 1981–82, regular LL.M. classes were introduced at the college. The LL.M. was a two-year taught programme combined with research, offered during both morning and evening hours. Subjects offered to LL.M. Part I and II students included Constitutional Law, Administrative Law, Law of Evidence, International Economic Law, among others. This research-oriented programme required six days a week of library work, seminars, lectures, and tutorials.

The LL.M. programme at University Law College was discontinued on 22 January 2021. Since then, the University of the Punjab has been offering the LL.M. through the Postgraduate School of Legal Studies.

=== LL.D. ===
The LL.D. degree was first offered by University Law College in 1890. In 1986, it was renamed as the Ph.D. in Law. Since then, only three individuals have been awarded the Ph.D. in Law (LL.D.) degree.

=== Admissions ===
Admission to all programmes at University Law College (PULC) is highly competitive and based strictly on merit. The college's relatively low fees and extensive student facilities make it a preferred choice for students pursuing a career in law.

- LL.B. Admissions: Admission to the LL.B. programme requires strong academic performance. Students must achieve excellent marks in matriculation and intermediate examinations. They must then pass the Law Admission Test (LAT), conducted by the HEC under the regulations of the PBC. Following the LAT, candidates appear for the PU Admission Test (USAT). After completion of these stages, a merit list is published, and successful candidates are offered admission.
- LL.M. Admissions: Admission to the LL.M. programme is even more competitive. Applicants are required to pass the LL.M. entry test and the Graduate Admission Test conducted by the PBC, followed by an interview. Candidates are assessed on their knowledge, skills, and commitment before being admitted to the Master's programme.

== Facilities ==
=== Library ===
The Law College Library is known for its extensive collection of legal books and journals. The collection is regularly updated to reflect changes in the country's laws and constitutional amendments. Online legal resources, including WestLaw, PakistanLawSite, and JSTOR, are also accessible.

=== IT Facility ===
Students have full access to online legal resources through computers available in the library. These computers are provided for general research and can also be reserved for individual study.

=== Moot Room ===
To prepare students for litigation and their future roles as lawyers, the college organises regular moot workshops, exercises, and competitions, managed by the Law Moot Society. A dedicated moot room is provided in accordance with the regulations of the PBC. The historic moot room of PULC has a rich legacy, having trained many prominent lawyers and judges.

=== Dr. Parvez Hassan Environmental Law Centre (PHELC) ===
The Environmental Law Centre was established by noted lawyer and environmentalist Dr. Parvez Hassan, an alumnus of PULC, to enhance the academic standards of the college. The centre, named in his honour, includes the Environmental Hall (also known as Begum Razia Hassan Auditorium), lecture halls, conference rooms, offices, and landscaped lawns. The centre has become a notable landmark associated with PULC.

=== Edhi Hall ===
Edhi Hall is the oldest hall of PULC and served as the main venue for events and competitions until the construction of the Environmental Hall. It is named after the renowned Abdul Sattar Edhi, a social worker and human rights activist. The hall continues to hold a significant role in the college's activities.

== Student societies and clubs ==
Student societies and clubs at PULC are managed under the umbrella of PULS. These include official, semi-official, and student-initiated clubs.

=== Official societies ===
Membership of official societies is determined through interviews conducted by permanent faculty members. Each society is led by a President, Vice President, and General Secretary, supported by a core committee. A faculty member serves as the Patron-in-Chief of each society. Members typically serve for one year, and the societies receive institutional funding. The official societies of PULC include:

- PULC Law Moot Society
- PULC Debating Society
- PULC Literary Society
- PULC ADR Clinic (the first Alternate Dispute Resolution Clinic in Pakistan)
- PULC Media Society
- PULC Character Building Society (established by the NAB, Pakistan)
- PULC Islamic Society
- PULC Sports Society
- Event Management Society

== Alumni ==
=== Lawyers and jurists ===
Notable lawyers and jurists associated with University Law College include:

- Abid Hassan Minto – Former President of the National Awami Party.
- S.M. Zafar – President of the Supreme Court Bar Association (1979), Chairman of the Human Rights Commission of Pakistan and Cultural Association of Pakistan, Chancellor of Hamdard University.
- Asma Jahangir – Human rights activist, co-founder of the Human Rights Commission of Pakistan, recipient of the United Nations Prize in the Field of Human Rights (2018), Hilal-i-Imtiaz (2010), and Nishan-e-Imtiaz (2018).
- V.D. Mahajan – Advocate of the Supreme Court of India, legal researcher, historian, and political scientist.
- Jawahar Lal Kaul – Indian lawyer, Vice Chancellor of Hemwati Nandan Bahuguna Garhwal University, and Visiting Fellow at University of St. Thomas School of Law since 2014.
- Akram Sheikh – President of the Supreme Court Bar Association of Pakistan and CEC of Pakistan Bar Council (1993–1994).
- Hamid Khan – Vice-President of Pakistan Tehreek-e-Insaf, legal scholar and writer, President of the Supreme Court Bar Association of Pakistan.
- Ali Ahmad Kurd – President of the Supreme Court Bar Association of Pakistan, key figure in the Lawyers' Movement 2007.
- Khizr Khan – Lawyer of the US Supreme Court, recipient of the Presidential Medal of Freedom (2022), Commissioner of the US-CIRF, LL.M. from Harvard Law School.
- Swami Shraddhanand – Indian lawyer, Hindu guru, and Arya Samaj activist.
- M. D. Tahir – Prominent senior lawyer and human rights activist.
- Shahla Zia – Women's rights activist and prominent lawyer.
- Mowahid Hussain Shah – Pakistani and US lawyer, co-founder of Pakistan Tehreek-e-Insaf.
- Barrister Dr Abdul Basit – Senior lawyer and Kashmiri nationalist.

=== Supreme Court judges ===
Notable Supreme Court judges who have been associated with University Law College include:

- Hans Raj Khanna – Justice of the Supreme Court of India and former Law Minister of India.
- Justice Javaid Iqbal – Acting Chief Justice of Pakistan (2007) and former Chairman of NAB.
- Chief Justice Saqib Nisar – 25th Chief Justice of Pakistan.
- Chief Justice Jawwad S. Khwaja – 23rd Chief Justice of Pakistan.
- Chief Justice Asif Saeed Khan Khosa – 26th Chief Justice of Pakistan.
- Chief Justice S.A. Rehman – 5th Chief Justice of Pakistan.
- Chief Justice Muhammed Afzal Zullah – 11th Chief Justice of Pakistan.
- Chief Justice Muhammad Munir – 2nd Chief Justice of Pakistan.
- Chief Justice Sheikh Anwarul Haq – 9th Chief Justice of Pakistan.
- Chief Justice Nasim Hassan Shah – 12th Chief Justice of Pakistan.
- Chief Justice Muhammad Yaqub Ali – 8th Chief Justice of Pakistan.
- Senior Justice Ijaz ul Ahsan – Chief Justice LHC (2015–16).
- Chief Justice Gul Muhammad Khan – 4th Chief Justice of the Federal Shariah Court.
- Chief Justice Mian Mehboob Ahmad – 8th Chief Justice of the Federal Shariah Court; born in Iraq; also served as Vice Chairperson of Hilal Ahmar.
- Chief Justice Riaz Ahmad Khan – 15th Chief Justice of the Federal Shariah Court.
- Chief Justice Najam ul Hassan – 16th Chief Justice of the Federal Shariah Court.
- Chief Justice Tassaduq Hussain Jillani – 21st Chief Justice of Pakistan.
- Chief Justice Abdul Hameed Dogar – Acting Chief Justice of Pakistan (2007–2009).
- Senior Justice Mansoor Ali Shah – 45th Chief Justice LHC.
- Senior Justice Hameedur Rahman – Chief Justice LHC (2011–2013).
- Senior Justice Khalil ur Rehman Ramday.
- Senior Justice Nasira Iqbal.
- Senior Justice Muhammad Nawaz Abbasi.
- Senior Justice Faqir Muhammad Khokhar.
- Senior Justice Falak Sher – 35th Chief Justice LHC.
- Senior Justice Muhammad Javed Buttar.
- Senior Justice Chaudhry Ijaz Ahmed.
- Chief Justice Irshad Hassan Khan – Chief Justice of Pakistan (2000–2002).
- Senior Justice Munib Akhtar.
- Senior Justice Sheikh Azmat Saeed.
- Justice Yahya Afridi – Current Chief Justice of Pakistan.
- Senior Justice Malik Shehzad Ahmad Khan.
- Senior Justice Aalia Neelum.
- Senior Justice Mujahid Mustaqeem Ahmad.

=== High Court judges ===
Notable judges of High Courts associated with University Law College include:

- Justice Sir Shadi Lal – Chief Justice of Lahore High Court (1920); the first Indian to become Chief Justice of any High Court. He also served as Principal and Dean of Punjab University Law College.
- Justice Ali Baqar Najafi – Chief Justice of Lahore High Court.
- Justice Shakeel ur Rahman Khan – Judge of Lahore High Court.
- Justice Khalil ur Rehman Khan – Chief Justice of Lahore High Court.

=== Attorneys General ===
Notable Attorneys General of Pakistan associated with University Law College include:

- Sardar Latif Khosa – 23rd Attorney General of Pakistan and 38th Governor of Punjab.
- Irfan Qadir – 26th Attorney General of Pakistan; former LHC Judge and Prosecutor General of the National Accountability Bureau.
- Ashtar Ausaf Ali – 29th and 32nd Attorney General of Pakistan.
- Mansoor Usman Awan – Attorney General of Pakistan.

=== Advocates General ===
- Ahmad Awais – Former Advocate General of Punjab.

=== Senior law officers of the government ===
- Akhtar Aly Kureshy – Law Officer of the Advocate General Punjab (2003–2009), Attorney General for Pakistan (2014–2018), and member of the Provincial Assembly of the Punjab (1998–2000).
- Rana Sher Zaman Akram – Assistant Advocate General.

=== Senator ===
- Hamid Khan – Senator, Senior Vice-President of Pakistan Tehreek-e-Insaf, and former President of the Supreme Court Bar Association of Pakistan (2001–2003).

=== Actors and television personalities ===
- Nauman Ijaz – Television actor; recipient of the Pride of Performance award in 2012.
- Naeem Bokhari – Actor, advocate of the Supreme Court of Pakistan, and former host of Khabarnaak.

=== Religious leaders ===
- Shaykh-ul-Islam Dr. Muhammad Tahir-ul-Qadri – Pakistani-Canadian Islamic scholar.

=== Prime Ministers ===
- Nawaz Sharif – 12th, 14th, and 20th Prime Minister of Pakistan; President of Pakistan Muslim League (N); and 9th Chief Minister of Punjab.
- Malik Meraj Khalid – Caretaker Prime Minister of Pakistan 1996-97; Prominent Barrister.

=== Governors ===
- Sardar Latif Khosa – 38th Governor of Punjab and 23rd Attorney General of Pakistan.

=== Ministers ===
- Bansi Lal Legha – 3rd Chief Minister of Haryana and former Indian Minister of Defence and Railways.
- Azam Nazeer Tarar – Current Minister of Law and Justice and Leader of the Senate.
- Rana Sanaullah – 39th Interior Minister of Pakistan.
- Khalid Anwer – Former Law Minister.
- Fawad Chaudhry – Former Minister of Information.
- Afzal Ahsan Randhawa – Member of the National Assembly of Pakistan from 1927 to 1977, writer and poet; recipient of the Pride of Performance award in 1996.
- Khwaja Muhammad Asif – Former Minister of Defence, Foreign Affairs, Sports, and Petroleum.
- Gurdial Singh Dhillon – Former Indian Minister of Agriculture and 5th Speaker of the Lok Sabha.
- Sana Ullah Khan – Former Minister of Local and Rural Development.
- Rao Sikander Iqbal – 23rd Defence Minister of Pakistan.
- Zahid Hamid – Former Minister of Law, Science and Technology, and Climate Change.
- Usman Ibrahim – Former Minister of Law, Human Rights, Defence, and Administration.
- Ahmer Bilal Soofi – Minister of Law and Justice, 2013.
- Muhammad Munir – 2nd Chief Justice of Pakistan and former Law Minister.
- Iqbal Haider – Minister of Law and Parliamentary Affairs, 1993–1994.
- Syed Afzal Haider – Former Minister of Law and Justice.
- Raja Zafar ul Haq – Chairman of Pakistan Muslim League (N), Leader of the Senate (2015–2018), former Minister of Information and Religious Affairs, and former Ambassador to Egypt in 1986.
- Sardar Nasrullah Khan Dreshak – Member of the National Assembly, 2018–2023.
- Kashmala Tariq – Federal Ombudsperson for Protection against Harassment and Member of the National Assembly, 2013.
- Khurshid Mahmood Kasuri – Former Minister of Foreign Affairs.
- Babar Awan – Former Minister of Law and Justice; recipient of Sitara-i-Imtiaz.
- Waheed Asghar Dogar – Member of the Provincial Assembly, 2013–2018.
- Malik Muhammad Waris Kallu – Member of the Provincial Assembly, 2002–2021.
- Rai Haider Ali Khan – Minister in the Provincial Assembly, 2018–2023.
- Rao Kashif Rahim Khan – Member of the Provincial Assembly, 2008–2018.
- Rana Mashhood Ahmad Khan – Former Member of the Provincial Assembly.

=== Bureaucrats and Law Enforcement ===
- Fawad Hasan Fawad – Director General of Civil Services Academy in 2018; former Minister and Secretary to the Prime Minister, 2020.
- Jalil Abbas Jilani – 22nd Ambassador of Pakistan to the United States; 27th Foreign Secretary of Pakistan; Minister for Foreign Affairs, 2024.
- Aminullah Chaudhry – Director General of the Civil Aviation Authority; Principal Secretary to the Prime Minister.
- Allah Bakhsh Malik – Federal Health Secretary; recipient of the UNESCO Confucius Prize for Literacy in 2011.
- Sikandar Sultan Raja – Chief Election Commissioner; former Secretary of Railways and Petroleum.
- Aftab Sultan – Inspector general of Punjab Police in 2013; Director General of Intelligence Bureau, 2013–2018; Chairman of National Accountability Bureau, 2022–2023.

== See also ==
- List of law schools in Pakistan
- List of universities in Pakistan
- University of the Punjab
