= Khawaja Haris Ahmad =

Pakistani lawyer

- خواجہ حارث احمد

Advocate General of Punjab
- In office March 2010 – October 2011
- Preceded by: Raza Farooq
- Succeeded by: Ashtar Ausaf Ali
- In office June 2008 – February 2009
- Preceded by: Aftab Iqbal Chaudhry
- Succeeded by: Raza Farooq

Member, Law and Justice Commission of Pakistan
- Incumbent
- Assumed office May 2025

Personal details
- Born: Lahore, Punjab, Pakistan
- Education: University of the Punjab; Punjab Law College

Khawaja Haris Ahmad (Urdu: خواجہ حارث احمد) is a Pakistani lawyer and Senior Advocate of the Supreme Court of Pakistan. He has served as the Advocate General of Punjab from 2008 to 2009 and again from 2010 to 2011, and has been a member of the Law and Justice Commission of Pakistan since 2025. He has represented former prime ministers Yousuf Raza Gillani, Nawaz Sharif and Imran Khan in accountability proceedings and has appeared in constitutional litigation before Pakistan's superior courts.

== Early life and family ==
Haris attended the University of the Punjab and later obtained an LL.B from Punjab Law College in 1978. Haris comes from a Lahore family with a longstanding association with the legal profession. His grandfather, Barrister Khwaja Ferozeuddin, practiced law before the partition of India in 1947. His father, Khwaja Sultan Ahmed (1929-2012), was a Pakistani criminal lawyer who appeared in a number of prominent political and criminal cases. His uncle, Khawaja Khurshid Anwar, was a prominent Pakistani musician and composer.

== Public service ==
Haris served as Advocate General of Punjab during two periods: from June 2008 to February 2009 and from March 2010 to October 2011. During his periods in public office and subsequent private practice, Haris appeared in litigation involving the Punjab government and its agencies, including matters concerning public infrastructure and other governmental disputes.

Haris became a member of the Law and Justice Commission of Pakistan in 2025.

== Constitutional and public law litigation ==
=== Eighteenth Amendment case ===
In 2010, Haris appeared before a 17-member full court of the Supreme Court in proceedings challenging provisions of the Eighteenth Amendment to the Constitution of Pakistan. Although the Punjab government took a different position, Haris opposed several of the challenged provisions, including those relating to intra-party elections, defection and the appointment of superior-court judges. He argued that the Constitution possessed certain salient features and that Parliament's power to amend it was subject to constitutional limitations, including the preservation of fundamental rights and the independence of the judiciary.

=== Raymond Davis case ===
In 2011, while serving as Advocate General of Punjab, he represented the provincial authorities before the Lahore High Court in proceedings concerning Raymond Davis, an American official detained after the killing of two Pakistani men in Lahore. The New York Times reported that Haris told the court that Pakistani authorities had registered a double-murder case against Davis.

=== Challenge to Twenty-fifth Amendment ===
In April 2021, he represented a group of tribal elders from the former Federally Administered Tribal Areas (FATA) in a Supreme Court challenge to the Twenty-fifth Amendment to the Constitution of Pakistan.

=== NAB Amendments case ===
In 2022, Haris was engaged to represent former prime minister Imran Khan in a constitutional challenge to amendments made to Pakistan's National Accountability Ordinance. The petition, brought under the Supreme Court's original constitutional jurisdiction, challenged provisions that altered the scope of accountability proceedings and the jurisdiction of the National Accountability Bureau. Haris appeared for Khan throughout the litigation before the three-member bench of the Supreme Court. The three-member bench, in a 2-1 decision, ruled in favor of Khan and declared the amendments in the accountability law as unconstitutional and ordered for restoration of cases against public office holders. However, the Court later allowed intra-court appeals and restored the amendments in 2024.

=== Military trials case ===
In 2024 and 2025, Haris represented Pakistan's Ministry of Defence before the Supreme Court's Constitutional Bench in proceedings concerning the trial of civilians by military courts following the May 9 incident.

== Major criminal and accountability proceedings ==
=== Representation of Yousuf Raza Gillani ===
Haris represented Gillani in a 2002 case before the Rawalpindi Bench of the Lahore High Court and secured his bail following a year of imprisonment on National Accountability Bureau charges.

=== Anti-narcotics law ===
In 2006, Khawaja Haris represented Haji Ayub Afridi before the Supreme Court in a high-profile case centered on the legal validity of the Anti-Narcotics Force's (ANF) attempt to confiscate Afridi's multi-million rupee assets. Haris argued against the forfeiture on procedural grounds, contending that the lower court's decision to seize the property was an improper ex parte ruling because his client had never formally received the required statutory notice.

=== Mumbai attacks trial ===
Haris was a member of the defence team representing suspects in the Pakistani prosecution arising from the November 2008 Mumbai attacks. The proceedings, conducted before an anti-terrorism court in Islamabad, involved seven Pakistani suspects accused in connection with the attacks. He later disassociated himself from the case in 2013, when the defendants changed their legal representation.

=== Representation of Nawaz Sharif ===
==== Early cases ====
Haris has represented former prime minister Nawaz Sharif in litigation spanning more than two decades. Following Sharif's return to Pakistan after his period of exile, Haris represented him before National Accountability Bureau proceedings filed against Sharif in 2008.

Haris also represented him in appellate proceedings arising from his conviction in the 2000 plane-hijacking case. In 2009, the Supreme Court of Pakistan set aside the conviction and acquitted Sharif. Haris also represented Sharif in his acquittal proceedings in the helicopter-misuse case before the Lahore High Court.

==== Panama papers and accountability proceedings ====
Haris later became a prominent member of Sharif's legal team in proceedings arising from the Panama Papers investigation. After the Supreme Court disqualified Sharif from office in 2017 and directed the filing of accountability references, Haris represented him in proceedings before the accountability court, including the Avenfield properties reference and subsequent proceedings concerning the Al-Azizia and Flagship Investment references. During the Avenfield proceedings, Haris briefly withdrew from the case after objecting to the accelerated schedule imposed on the accountability proceedings. He subsequently rejoined Sharif's legal team and continued to represent him in the corruption references.

In the proceedings following the Panama Papers case, Haris acted as lead defense counsel for Nawaz Sharif. He argued issues concerning the burden of proof, the evidence relied upon by the National Accountability Bureau, and the relationship between Sharif and the London properties at the center of the Avenfield reference. He continued to appear in subsequent proceedings connected with Sharif's convictions and appeals.

In September 2020, Haris withdrew from representing Nawaz Sharif after the Islamabad High Court rejected a petition to defer proclamation proceedings against the former prime minister.

=== Harris Steel litigation ===
Haris has represented the Bank of Punjab in litigation arising from the Harris Steel Industries loan scandal. In 2009, Haris appeared for the Bank of Punjab before the Supreme Court in proceedings concerning the recovery of funds and the assets of the accused. In 2024, an accountability court rejected the National Accountability Bureau's application for withdrawal of the reference after hearing arguments from Haris in his capacity as the bank's counsel.

=== Representation of Imran Khan ===
He represented Imran Khan in proceedings connected with the Toshakhana case and the accountability references filed against Khan. He was the lead counsel in the Toshakhana case and cross-examined the prosecution's witnesses in the proceedings. As per Geo News, Haris withdrew from Khan's central legal team due to 'discipline issues' in 2023.

=== Notable election cases ===
Haris has also appeared in election-related litigation. In 2015, he represented Federal Railways Minister Khawaja Saad Rafique in proceedings in which the Supreme Court suspended an election tribunal's decision that had de-seated Rafique and ordered a re-election in NA-125.

== Notable amicus curiae appointments ==
Haris has been appointed amicus curiae in a number of constitutional and public interest cases before the Supreme Court of Pakistan and other courts.

In 2012, the Supreme Court appointed Haris, and former attorney general Makhdoom Ali Khan, to assist a five-judge bench in an advisory case arising from a 31-page presidential reference, seeking legal clarity on the roles of the president, the judicial commission, and the parliamentary committee in appointing judges to the superior judiciary, following a dispute over Islamabad High Court appointments.

In December 2023, the Supreme Court appointed Haris as an amicus to assist a nine-member larger bench in the decades-old Zulfikar Ali Bhutto presidential reference. He later withdrew from the reference as a conflict-of-interest was raised regarding his late father's past legal work.

In February 2024, the Supreme Court appointed Haris as an amicus to assist a five-judge bench evaluating whether the Supreme Judicial Council (SJC) retains jurisdiction over judges post-resignation. Haris argued that the primary purpose of Article 209 is the removal of a judge from office, maintaining that SJC proceedings become 'meaningless' the moment a judge retires or resigns.

In 2025, in proceedings before the Court concerning questions of constitutional and judicial jurisdiction after the Twenty-sixth Amendment to the Constitution of Pakistan, the Court referred to submissions made by him in his capacity as an amicus.

Haris has also served as amicus curiae in numerous other constitutional and public-interest matters, including:

- a 2011 case before a four-member Supreme Court bench, alongside Barrister Aitzaz Ahsan, concerning death sentences awarded to women and children under anti-narcotics law;
- a 2011 suo moto case before a three-member Supreme Court bench investigating the writing-off of 256 billion rupees in bank loans, in which Haris argued that while State Bank of Pakistan Circular 29 was legally valid, its provisions had been systematically misused over a long period;
- a 2012 Lahore High Court case reviewing the eligibility of Pakistan People's Party leader Babar Awan to contest Senate elections;
- the 2013 OGRA corruption case;
- 2013 suo moto proceedings, before a bench headed by Chief Justice Iftikhar Muhammad Chaudhry, over the alleged non-transparent distribution of development funds by former Prime Minister Raja Pervez Ashraf, in which Haris argued that using such funds for individual or political benefit violated the prime ministerial oath of office;
- a 2014 case, before a bench headed by Chief Justice Nasirul Mulk, challenging the appointment of Qamar Zaman Chaudhry as chairman of the National Accountability Bureau, in which Haris argued that formal consultation between the Prime Minister and the Leader of the Opposition is legally required to validate the appointment;
- a 2015 appointment to help formulate a mechanism addressing institutional apathy and 'thana culture' within the criminal justice system, in collaboration with retired law enforcement officials and the Law and Justice Department;
- a 2016 case before a five-member bench headed by Chief Justice Anwar Zaheer Jamali evaluating whether Sections 22A and 22B of the Code of Criminal Procedure, governing the registration of First Information Reports, conflicted with the Constitution, in which Haris argued the provisions were constitutionally valid and noted that roughly 30 to 35 percent of registered FIRs never resulted in chargesheets being submitted to courts; and
- a 2019 Islamabad High Court appointment, alongside lawyers Babar Sattar and Ahmer Bilal Soofi, to scrutinize the federal quota system for inductions into the Central Superior Services.
