= Ejaz Yousaf =

Pakistani judge

Chaudhry Ejaz Yousaf

10th Chief Justice of the Federal Shariat Court
- In office 9 May 2003 – 8 May 2006
- Nominated by: Pervez Musharraf
- Preceded by: Fazal Ellahi Khan
- Succeeded by: Haziq-ul-Khairi

Personal details
- Born: 7 January 1952 (age 74) Quetta, Pakistan
- Education: LL.B.
- Alma mater: University of Balochistan

Chaudhry Ejaz Yousaf (born 7 January 1952) is a Pakistani retired judge and lawyer who served as the 10th chief justice of the Federal Shariat Court from 9 May 2003 to 8 May 2006.

== Biography ==
Yousaf was born in Quetta, Pakistan. He did his early schooling Municipal High School Depalpur, Government High School, Mianwali and Central Model School, Lahore. He obtained his matriculation from Punjab Board of School Education (PBSC) and intermediate from the Government Islamia Science College, Karachi. He graduated from the University of Balochistan and obtained Bachelor of Laws and master's in Economics from the same university in 1974.

He became advocate of the Balochistan Bar Council and the Sindh Bar Council on 31 May 1976. He became advocate of the Supreme Court of Pakistan on 12 August 1978 and 15 June 1991. Yousaf was appointed as honorary lecturer in the University Law College Quetta from 1983 to 1992.

From 1985 to 1992, he was appointed as a legal advisor to the Quetta Development Authority, and Balochistan Water and Sanitation Authority from 1986 to 1992 and United Bank Limited legal advisor from 2 January 1985 to 1992. He was later appointed as advocate of panel for the National Bank of Pakistan from 1984 to 1992, the National Development Finance Corporation and Regional Development Finance Corporation from 1985 to 1992. He has been an advocate for Water & Power Development Authority from 1985 to 1992.

Yousaf was appointed as special law officer by the Ministry of Law, Justice & Parliamentary Affairs in 1992. He has been a special prosecutor for the Ministry of Narcotics Control and the Anti-Narcotics Force for Balochistan Province in 1990.

Chief justice the Balochistan High Court offered him district and session judge post but he declined to work on that post, however he worked as an advocate general for Balochistan on 27 August 1992 until he was granted the status of minister on 13 November 1996. He was the first additional advocate general to be appointed for Balochistan. His father Chaudhry Muhammad Yousaf was also the first assistant advocate general for the same province. Yousaf has been a chairperson of the Balochistan Bar Council until he was elevated as the Federal Shariat Court judge on 19 February 1997.

On 14 January 2003, he was appointed as acting chief justice of the Federal Shariat Court and was eventually elevated as chief justice of the same court on 9 May 2003 until he retired from his legal profession on 8 May 2006.
