= Muhammad Noor Meskanzai =

Pakistani judge (1956–2022)

17th Chief Justice of the Federal Shariat Court
- In office 15 May 2021 – 15 May 2022
- Nominated by: Arif Alvi
- Preceded by: Najam ul Hasan

18th Chief Justice of Balochistan High Court
- In office 26 December 2014 – 31 August 2018
- Nominated by: Mamnoon Hussain
- Preceded by: Ghulam Mustafa Mengal
- Succeeded by: Tahira Safdar

Chairperson of Balochistan Bar Council
- In office 24 March 2005 – 24 March 2006

Personal details
- Born: 1 September 1956 Kharan, Balochistan, Pakistan
- Died: 14 October 2022 (aged 66) Kharan, Balochistan, Pakistan
- Education: University of Balochistan (BA); University Law College, Quetta (LL.B)

Muhammad Noor Meskanzai (Urdu: محمد نور مسکانزئی; 1; September 1956 – 14 October 2022) was a Pakistani judge who served as the 17th Chief Justice of the Federal Shariat Court (FSC). Prior to his appointment as the FSC chief justice on 15 May 2021, he served as the 18th chief justice of Balochistan High Court from 26 December 2014 to 31 August 2018. He was assassinated by an outlawed insurgent group in his hometown. His killer was arrested 2 weeks later and was investigated by the ISI, to apprehend the facilitators and other suspects in the case.

The president of Pakistan appointed him as the chief justice of Federal Shariat Court for a term of one year three days before his retirement as the Balochistan High Court chief justice. He was critically injured on 14 October 2022 when he was shot outside a mosque in Kharan, Pakistan. Later he died at a nearby hospital.

== Early life ==
Meskanzai was born in Kharan, Pakistan to Dr. Molvi Muhammad Qasim Aini Baloch. He did his early schooling from the Government Middle School (in modern-day High School), Kunri. The school was founded by his father and was the first private educational institution in the area. It was later recognised by the Education Commission of Pakistan between 1951 and 1952. He did his matriculation from the same school and later went to Quetta. He obtained his F.A. from the Government Degree College, Quetta and B.A., and B.Ed. from the University of Balochistan. He obtained his Bachelor of Laws from the University Law College, Quetta in 1979–1980.

== Career ==
Meskanzai started his legal practice in September 1981 and was subsequently appointed a legal advisor to Customs for Makran Division, and Makran Scout at Turbat. He also served as a member of the Panel of Legal Advisors to PTCL Makran Division. Justice Meskanzai was appointed assistant advocate general for Balochistan, Pakistan where he remained in the office from June to December, 1998. He was then elected as vice chairman of the Balochistan Bar Council from the 24 March 2005 to 24 March 2006.

Meskanzai was invited by International Lawyers Club United Kingdom to London as a chief guest in 2019. He remained a member of various judicial organizations such as the National Judicial Policy Making Committee, Law and Justice Commission of Pakistan, Advisory Board of Al Mizan Foundation, Council of Trustees & Selection Board of the International Islamic University Islamabad, Administration Committee of Al-Mizan Foundation, Board of Governors, and Board of Trustees.

In April 2022, he authored the landmark judgment that declared the riba-based (interest-based) banking system against the application of Sharia in Pakistan.

== Death ==
Meskanzai was fatally shot inside a mosque when he was performing ISHA prayer in (Masjid Ayesha) Balochistan's Kharan area, on 14 October 2022. Kharan's Superintendent of Police Asif Halim told Dawn News that unidentified assailants opened fire at him inside the mosque when he was performing ISHA prayer, which left Maskanzai gravely injured. He was taken to a nearby hospital, where he died of his injuries.

According to the Voice of America Urdu, the Balochistan Liberation Army accepted responsibility for his killing, calling him a 'high-profile target.'
