= Mian Mehboob Ahmad =

Pakistani judge (born 1933)

8th Chief Justice of the Federal Shariat Court
- In office 8 January 1997 – 7 January 2000
- Nominated by: Wasim Sajjad
- Preceded by: Nazir Ahmad Bhatti
- Succeeded by: Fazal Ellahi Khan

29th Chief Justice of Lahore High Court
- In office 3 January 1991 – 27 June 1994
- Nominated by: Muhammad Afzal Zullah
- Preceded by: Khalil-Ur-Rehman Khan
- Succeeded by: Muhammad Rafiq Tarar

Personal details
- Born: 30 July 1933 Baghdad, Iraq

Mian Mehboob Ahmad (born 30 July 1933) is a Pakistani retired judge who served as the 8th chief justice of the Federal Shariat Court from 8 January 1997 to 7 January 2000, and the 29th chief justice of the Lahore High Court from 3 January 1991 to 27 June 1994.

== Biography ==
Ahmad was born in Baghdad, Iraq. He started his legal practice on in 1957 after obtaining his law degree. He worked as an advocate of the West Pakistan High Court and the Supreme Court of Pakistan for about 20 years.

He served as a member of the Lahore High Court Bar Association. His legal practice was predominantly focused on constitutional and civil rights, as well as other legal matters concerning commercial cases.

He was later appointed as Judge of Lahore High Court, Lahore on 3 June 1978 and became chairperson of the Punjab Local Councils Election authority. The government of Pakistan later proposed his appointment as judge of the Federal Shariat Court but he declined to work on that post and a notification concerning his retirement was issued in August 1994. However the Supreme Court of Pakistan delivered its verdict on 24 March 1996 citing his retirement as "unconstitutional". Later a second notification concerning his retirement as chief justice of the Lahore Hugh Court was rescinded by the president. After that notification, he continued as chief justice of the Lahore High Court unit 29 July 1995.

He also served as advisor to B.I.C.C. Group of Companies, Forbes Forbes Campbell Group of Companies, and chairperson of the National Insurance Reforms Commissions. He travelled to the Asia, the United States and Europe. He travelled to China in 1986 where he participated in the WIPO's program Beijing Patent Trial Course. He remained associated with the Supreme People's Court from 9 December to 18 December 1986. The government of Egypt and Saudi Arabia invited him for participating in a high powered delegation. He also represented the country in the 15th Round Table Conference on International Humanitarian Law and Refugee Problems held in Sanremo, Italy under the UNESCO and the International Institute of Humanitarian Law.

Ahmad also served as a member of Shariat Bench, Lahore High Court, president of the Muslim Educational Conference and one of the founding members of Heart Association of Lahore and Pakistan Society for Cancer Control. He established societies concerning heart diseases and cancer in the country. He served vice-chairperson of Hilal Ahmar.
