= Farooq Naek =

Pakistani politician

- فاروق نائیک
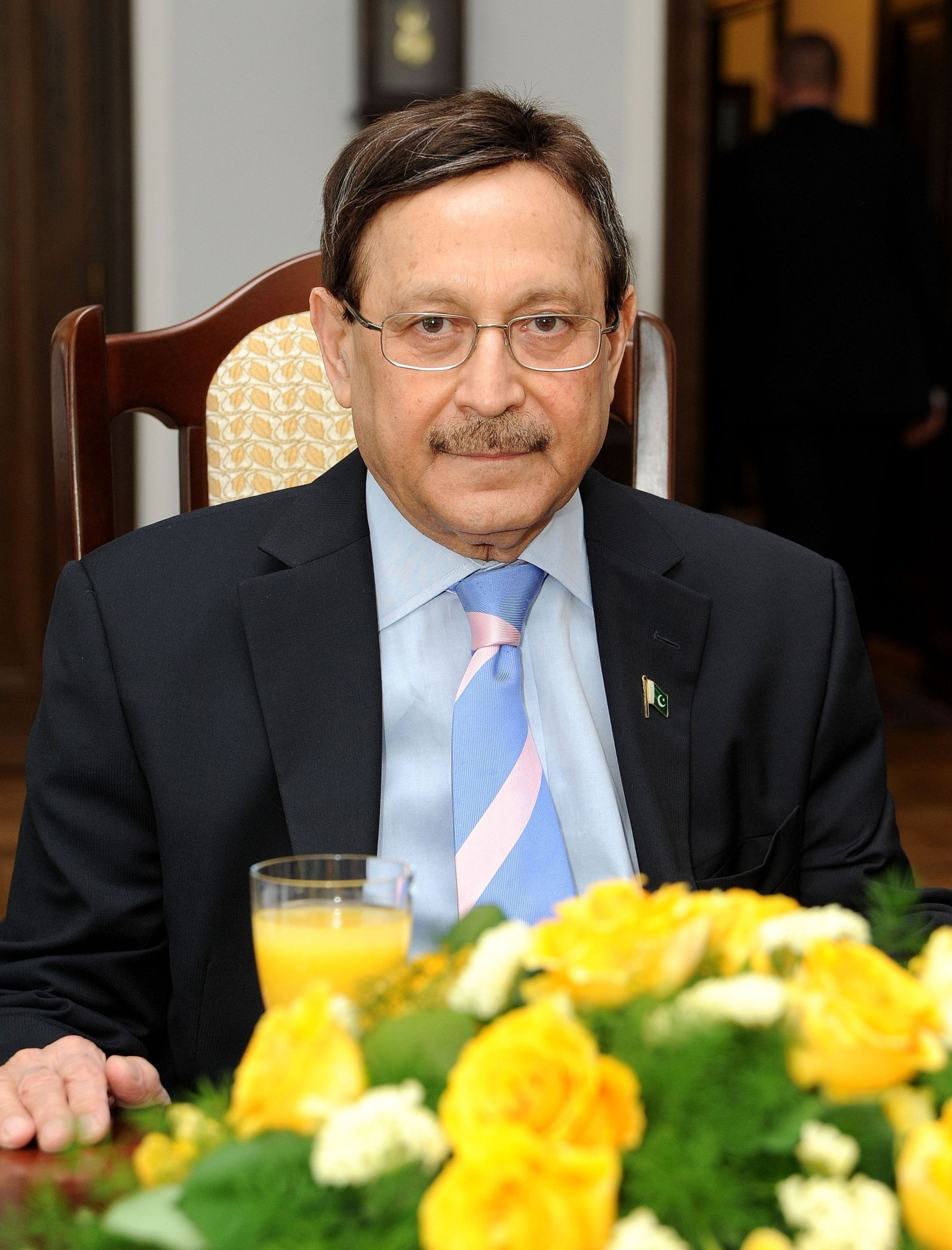
- Naek in 2011

Minister of Justice
- In office 11 April 2012 – 16 March 2013
- Prime Minister: Yousaf Raza Gillani; Raja Pervaiz Ashraf
- Preceded by: Moula Bakhsh Chandio
- Succeeded by: Ahmer Bilal Soofi (Acting)
- In office 31 March 2008 – 10 March 2009
- Prime Minister: Yusuf Raza Gillani
- Preceded by: Wasi Zafar
- Succeeded by: Babar Awan

5th Chairman of the Senate
- In office 12 March 2009 – 12 March 2012
- Preceded by: Muhammad Mian Soomro
- Succeeded by: Nayyar Hussain Bukhari

Chairman Executive of the Pakistan Bar Council
- In office 2024–2025

Personal details
- Born: 1 July 1947 (age 79) Sialkot, Punjab, British India
- Party: PPP (1971-present)
- Relations: Khawaja Asif (cousin)
- Education: University of Karachi

Farooq Hamid Naek (Urdu: فاروق حمید نائیک; born 1 July 1947) also spelled Farooq H. Naik, is a Pakistani politician and lawyer, who served as the Chairman Senate, Minister of Law as well as headed the Ministry of Justice (Pakistan) in the Government of Pakistan led by Prime Minister Yusuf Raza Gillani.

After successfully contesting the 2008 general elections, Naek won the bid for the law ministry, but ascended to Chairman of the Senate in 2009. Due to cabinet reshuffle by Gillani in 2012, he was again appointed law minister of the country. He is a high-ranking member of the central committee of the Pakistan Peoples Party, and has been a personal lawyer and legal counselor in the legal cases leveled up against Benazir Bhutto and her spouse Asif Ali Zardari since 1996.

== Early life and education ==
Naek was brought up in Karachi, Sindh, Pakistan. After graduating from high school, he was accepted at the Sindh Muslim Law College, where he earned an LLB in law. Later, he went on to attend the post-graduate school of the University of Karachi where he earned an MA in Economics.

== Legal career ==
Naek enrolled as Advocate of local court in 1970, advocate of high court in 1976, and of Supreme Court in 1990. He resigned from the judicial service after serving as civil judge for two years and became an active member of the PPP in the mid-1970s.

Naek contested the 2016 Supreme Court Bar Association elections for president, against Rasheed A. Razvi. Naek however lost the election by a large margin.

== Political career ==
His political career began in 1971, when he served as assistant director at the Directorate of Labour and Social Welfare of the provincial Government of Sindh. He then was a Civil Judge and First Class Magistrate from 1971 to 1975. He was elected General Secretary of Karachi Bar Association during mid-1985-90. He also served as Deputy Attorney General of Pakistan from 1994 to 1996 in the second Benazir Bhutto government.

Naek was arrested in 1995, after leading a demonstration against the dictatorial rule of General Zia Ul Haq. He was held in Central Prison, Karachi, for about six months along with 10 other lawyers.

Although Naek was associated with the PPP for three decades, he only shot to prominence when he fought the corruption and criminal cases against Benazir Bhutto and Asif Ali Zardari during Pervez Musharraf's rule in and out of Pakistan. It was during these extremely difficult years of Zardari that Naek earned his trust. Before and after becoming the President of Pakistan, Zardari always consulted him on legal matters and other issues.

Naek has been the senator from Sindh since 2003. He was appointed the Federal Minister for Law and Justice as a result of the 2008 Pakistani general election. He was reappointed the Federal Minister for Law and Justice in April 2012 after his 3-year term as Chairman of Senate.

Political offices
Preceded by Wasi Zafar	Minister of Justice; 2008–2009	Succeeded by Babar Awan
Preceded by Muhammad Mian Soomro	Chairman of the Senate; 2009–2012	Succeeded by Nayyar Hussain Bukhari
Preceded by Moula Bakhsh Chandio	Minister of Justice; 2012–2013	Succeeded by Ahmer Bilal Soofi; Acting
