= Nazir Ahmad Bhatti =

Pakistani judge

7th Chief Justice of the Federal Shariat Court
- In office 19 July 1994 – 4 January 1997
- Nominated by: Farooq Leghari
- Preceded by: Mir Hazar Khan Khoso
- Succeeded by: Mian Mehboob Ahmad

Nazir Ahmad Bhatti was a Pakistani judge who served as the 7th chief justice of the Federal Shariat Court from 19 July 1994 to 4 January 1997.

Bhatti his judicial career as a civil judge in 1960 and was later appointed as a district and sessions judge in 1972. He became chairperson of Services Tribunal in 1982 and deputy secretary, Law Department secretary for provisional Assembly of the North-West Frontier Province for three years.

He was elevated as Peshawar High Court judge in 1983 and the Federal Shariat Court judge on 28 October 1991 until he was appointed as chief justice of the Federal Shariat Court on 19 July 1994.
