= National Youth Awards =

Pakistani award ceremony

The National Youth Awards were conferred between 2008 and 2010 by the Government of Pakistan through the Ministry of Youth Affairs to high-achieving and distinguished male and females from across the country. These awards were conferred after a competitive selection process, which commenced in late June every year and culminated in the announcement of the awards on the eve of the International Youth Day on 12 August. The Ministry of Youth Affairs was dissolved in 2010. Since 2019, the Youth for Pakistan organization confers National Youth Awards along similar lines.

== History ==
The awards were instituted in 2007, and were awarded annually. Advertisements are placed in leading dailies of Pakistan in late June asking for nominations. These nominations then underwent a process of thorough scrutiny by a team which includes educationists, researchers etc., in addition to the governmental personnel. After multiple rounds of meetings for this selective and transparent selection process, the awards were announced by the Ministry on 12 August every year.

== Objective and categories ==
The main objective of the National Youth Awards, as dictated by the policy directives of the Ministry of Youth Affairs of the Government of Pakistan, was to "Recognize the achievements of the young people in their lives and of volunteers working for the welfare and development of the youth".

There are different categories in which the awards are given. The awards are given to individuals who have excelled in the fields of Literature; Culture; Education; Science & Technology; Sports; Business; Community Service; Media; Qirat and Na`at; Management Science; Agriculture; Computer Science and Information Technology; Environment; Technicians, Paramedics and skilled workers. In addition, there are awards for Special Youth and the Jinnah Youth Award for Organizations & Personnel working for the welfare of the youth.

There are no fixed numbers of awards that are conferred every year. For the year 2008, there were 35 awards that were handed out, for this year round i.e. 2009, there were only 25 awards given. The Awards are meant to encourage and garner as broad participation as possible, without placing any limitations on applications. However, the awards are only given to those who have proven their outstanding academic and extra-curricular achievements. When the awards-conferring body feels that there are no applications that merit the award for a particular category, no award is given in that category, regardless of the number of potential applications.

== Eligibility and benefits of the award ==
Any Pakistani National aged 15–29 is eligible to apply for the National Youth Awards. There is no age limit for the Jinnah Youth Award. The Award, in addition to a certificate and a shield, is accompanied by PKR 50,000 for each recipient.

== National Youth Awards 2008 ==
=== Names of award winners for 2008 ===
No.	Name	Province	Category
1	Mr. Muhammad Shafique	Azad Jammu & Kashmir	Literature
2	Miss Preeya Tabita	Punjab	Literature
3	Mr. Muhammad Idrees	Balochistan	Literature
4	Miss Haniya Yameen	Islamabad (ICT)	Culture
5	Syeda Aneesa Rafique	Punjab	Culture
6	Miss Bushra Obaid	Balochistan	Culture
7	Mr. Zawar Munawar Saleemi	Sindh	Education
8	Mr. Iqtidar Karamat Cheema	Punjab	Education
9	Mr. Shehryar Masud Khan Khattak	NWFP	Education
10	Dr. Mohammad Ali Rai	Islamabad (ICT)	Science & Technology (Medicine / Research)
11	Mr. Kashif Mahmood	Punjab	Science & Technology
12	Mr. Muhammad Imran	Punjab	Science & Technology
13	Miss Sarah Mehboob Khan	Islamabad (ICT)	Sports
14	Mr. Waheed Hameed	NWFP	Sports
15	Miss Kiran Khan	Punjab	Sports
16	Mr. Muhammad Nawaz	NWFP	Community Service
17	Mr. Pritam	Sindh	Community Service
18	Kamran Khan Kakar	Balochistan	Community Service
19	Mr. Inam Ul Hassan Kashmiri	Punjab	Media
20	Syeda Mahwish Fatima Naqvi	Sindh	Media
21	Miss Fatimah Zafar	Azad Jammu & Kashmir	Media
22	Syed Zabeeb Masood	Punjab	Qirat & Naat
23	Mr. Muhammad Noman Tahir	Sindh	Qirat & Naat
24	Miss Isma Khalid	Balochistan	Qirat & Naat
25	Miss Ayesha Binte Ashfaq	Punjab	Computer Science & Information Technology
26	Mr. Mudassar Raza	Islamabad (ICT)	Computer Science & Information Technology
27	Engineer Muhammad Farooq Shibli	Punjab	Computer Science & Information Technology
28	Mr. Zain Ul Haq	Punjab	Technicians, Paramedics & Skilled Workers
29	Miss Nazia Maqbool	NWFP	Technicians, Paramedics & Skilled Workers
30	Miss Lozina Shoaib	Punjab	Special Youth
31	Raja Abdullah Akhtar	Punjab	Special Youth
32	Miss Shazia Batool	Balochistan	Special Youth
33	Dr. Qaisar Javaid (Chairman, Pakistan Lions Youth Council)	Punjab	Jinnah Youth Award
34	Noor Saeed	NWFP	Environment
35	Muhammad Shabir	Northern Area	

== National Youth Awards 2009 ==
These were conferred on 12 August 2009 and were presided over by Chairman Senate of Pakistan, Farooq H. Naik. 25 high-achievers were conferred upon the award for this year. Muhammad Aadil, a special youth award holder gave a speech on this occasion, and said that special persons should not be deprived of the basic facilities as it hinders them from taking part in country’s development.

== National Youth Awards 2010 ==
The investiture Ceremony of National Youth Award 2010 was scheduled to be held on 11 August 2010 but was postponed owing to disastrous floods in the Country. In the meanwhile implementation commission has decided to devolve the five federal ministries including Ministry of youth affairs. It was then decided that shields, certificates and monetary award of Rs. 50,000/- for each awardee be sent to Secretary Youth Department of provinces to deliver the awardees of respective provinces.

=== Names of National Youth Award Winners for 2010 ===
1 M. Shahab Alam (Team Hexa-K, Design & Fabrication of fuel efficient vehicle)

Saad Khan, Sikandar Hayat, Rameez Khan, Fawad Bin Fazil & Haji Gul - Category: Science & Technology

2 Miss. Syeda Umama Wahid (Hyderabad) Sindh. Category: Qiraat & Naat

3 Mr. Ross. M. Parkash (Hyderabad) Sindh. Category: Community Service

4 Mr. Arshad Ali (Pattoki, District. Kasur) Punjab. Category: (Sp.Y)Islamic Arts & Quranic Calligraphy

5 Mr. Asghar Ali (Layya). Punjab Category: Poetry

6 Syed Adil Zeeshan (Rawalpindi) Islamabad Category: Education

7 Muhammad Waqar Qureshi (Tando-Allahyar) Sindh Category: Education (Physics)

8 Asimah Majeed Marwat (Peshawar) KPK Category: Environment

9 Zunnu Raen Akhtar (Multan)Punjab Category: Agriculture

The recipients received National Youth Awards-2010 From Ministry of Youth Affairs, Government of Pakistan through Provincial Governments after 18th Amendment. in Punjab, the awards were given in a formal ceremony chaired by Chief Minister Punjab Mian Muhammad Shahbaz Sharif and Mian Mujtaba Shuja ur Rehman (Minister for Education) at Al-Hamra Hall III, Lahore on April 11, 2011. Ceremony was organized under supervision of Mr. Mohy-ud-Din Ahmad Wani, Secretary Department of Information, Culture & Youth Affairs, Govt. of Punjab.

Six recipients of Sindh Province have received their NATIONAL YOUTH AWARDS-2010 from Federal Ministry of Youth Affairs, Government of Pakistan though Provincial Governments after 18th Amendment, In Sindh, the Awards were given in a formal ceremony chaired by Mr. Raza Haroon, Provincial Minister, Information Technology at Karachi Gymkhana, Karachi on 18 May 2011. Ceremony was organized under supervision of Mr. Shoaib Ahmed Siddiqui, Secretary, Department of Youth Affairs and Sports, Government of Sindh.

== Allegations of nepotism and favoritism ==
There have been incidents where some youth have alleged nepotism and favoritism in the selection of the awards. In fact, a case was filed in 2008 in the Islamabad High Court to dispute the selection for the awards, but the case was overturned, as the High Court decided the selection process was fair and transparent. More recently, for the 2009 awards, voices of dissent have again been raised.
