= Minister for Law and Justice (Pakistan) =

Political ministry

Minister for Law and Justice of Pakistan
- وزیرِ قانون و انصاف
- State emblem of Pakistan
- Incumbent; Azam Nazeer Tarar since 11 March 2024
- Ministry of Law and Justice
- Member of: Cabinet of Pakistan
- Reports to: Prime Minister
- Seat: Islamabad
- Appointer: President of Pakistan on advice of Prime Minister
- Formation: 1947
- First holder: Jogendra Nath Mandal
- Website: Ministry of Law and Justice

The Law Minister of Pakistan heads the Ministry of Law and Justice. They serve in the cabinet of the Prime Minister.

== List of ministers ==
- Jogendra Nath Mandal (1947–1951)
- Pirzada Abdus Sattar Abdur Rahman (1951–1953)
- A.K. Brohi (1953–1954)
- Huseyn Shaheed Suhrawardy (1954–1955)
- I. I. Chundrigar (1955–1957)
- Muhammad Ibrahim (1958–1962)
- Muhammad Munir (1962–1963)
- Khurshid Ahmad (1963–1965)
- Syed Muhammed Zafar (1965–1969)
- Alvin Robert Cornelius (1969–1971)
- Mahmud Ali Kasuri (1971–1972)
- Abdul Hafeez Pirzada (1972–1974)
- Malik Meraj Khalid (1974–1976)
- Malik Muhammad Akhtar (1976–1977)
- S.M Masood (1977)
- A.K Brohi (1977-1979)
- Syed Sharifuddin Pirzada (1979–1984)
- Iqbal Ahmad Khan (1985–1986)
- Wasim Sajjad (1987–1988)
- Aitzaz Ahsan (1988)
- Iftikhar Gilani (1988–1990)
- Syed Fakhr Imam (1990–1991)
- Chaudhry Abdul Gafoor (1991–1993)
- Abdul Shakoor-ul Salam (1993–1994)
- Iqbar Haider (1994–1995)
- N.D. Khan (1995–1997)
- Khalid Anwer (1997–1999)
- Aziz A. Munshi (2000–2001)
- Shahida Jamil (2001–2002) [1st female]
- Raza Hayat Hiraj (2003–2004)
- Khalid Ranjha (2004–2005)
- Wasi Zafar (2006–2007)
- Zahid Hamid (2007)
- Chaudhry Shahid Akram Bhinder (2007–2008)
- Babar Awan (2008–2011) gf
- Mola Baksh Chandio (Senator) (2011–2012)
- Farooq Naek (2012–2013)
- Zahid Hamid (2013)
- Ahmer Bilal Soofi (2013)
- Pervaiz Rashid (2013–2016)
- Zahid Hamid (2016–2017)
- Usman Ibrahim (2017)
- Zafarullah Khan (2017–2018)
- Chaudhry Mehmood Bashir Virk (2018)
- Syed Ali Zafar (2018)
- Farogh Naseem (2018–2022)
- Fawad Chaudhry (2022)
- Azam Nazeer Tarar (April 2022–October 2022)
- Ayaz Sadiq (October 2022 - 30 November 2022)
- Azam Nazeer Tarar (30 November 2022 - 10 August 2023)
- Ahmed Irfan Aslam (17 August 2023 - 4 March 2024)
- Azam Nazeer Tarar (11 March 2024 – present)

== See also ==
- Constitution of Pakistan
- Judiciary of Pakistan
- Justice minister
- Law of Pakistan
- Minister of Foreign Affairs (Pakistan)
- Ministry of Interior (Pakistan)
- Ministry of Law and Justice (Pakistan)
- Pakistan Bar Council
- Politics of Pakistan
- President of Pakistan
- Prime Minister of Pakistan
