= Kharan, Pakistan =

Kharan حاران خاران
- City
- Location within Balochistan, Pakistan Location within Pakistan
- Coordinates: 28°35′0″N 65°25′0″E
- Country: Pakistan
- Province: Balochistan
- Division: Rakhshan
- District: Kharan
- Tehsil: Kharan

Government
  - Type: Municipal Committee
  - Chairman: Vacant
  - Vice-Chairman: Vacant
- Elevation: 692 m (2,270 ft)

Population (2023)
  - City: 80,806
  - Rank: 157th in Pakistan
- Time zone: UTC+5 (PST)

Kharan (Urdu: خاران; Balochi: حاران) is a city in Kharan District, Balochistan, Pakistan. It is located at 28°35'0N 65°25'0E with an altitude of 692 metres (2273 feet). The city is also the division headquarters of Rakhshan Division. It is populated by many Baloch clans. Former Federal Shariat Court and Balochistan High Court chief justice Muhammad Noor Meskanzai belongs to this city.

== History ==
The region of Būqān (Note: Arabic: الْبُوقَانُ) (Kharan) is first mentioned prominently in Islamic historical sources in 55 AH (674). After that, it is usually mentioned together with Qīqān (Kalat). According to the Kharan Gazetteer, several Kufic inscriptions have been found in Kharan. These inscriptions date from the second to the fourth century AH.

== Demographics ==
=== Population ===
Historical population
Year	Pop.	±% p.a.
1951	2,589	—
1961	2,692	+0.39%
1972	6,093	+7.71%
1981	10,472	+6.20%
1998	27,806	+5.91%
2017	51,388	+3.29%
2023	80,806	+7.84%

According to the 2023 census, Kharan had a population of 80,806.

The total population of city in the 1981 Pakistan Census was recorded as 10,472, which increased to 27,806 according to the Census of 1998. As per the 2017 Census of Pakistan, the population of the city was recorded as 44,655 with an increase of about 60.6% in just 19 years.

Languages

Languages of Kharan (2023 Census)
1. Balochi (99.0%)
2. Pashto (0.17%)
3. Urdu (0.15%)
4. Others (0.68%)
