= Haziqul Khairi =

Pakistani judge (1931–2023)

The Honourable Haziqul Khairi
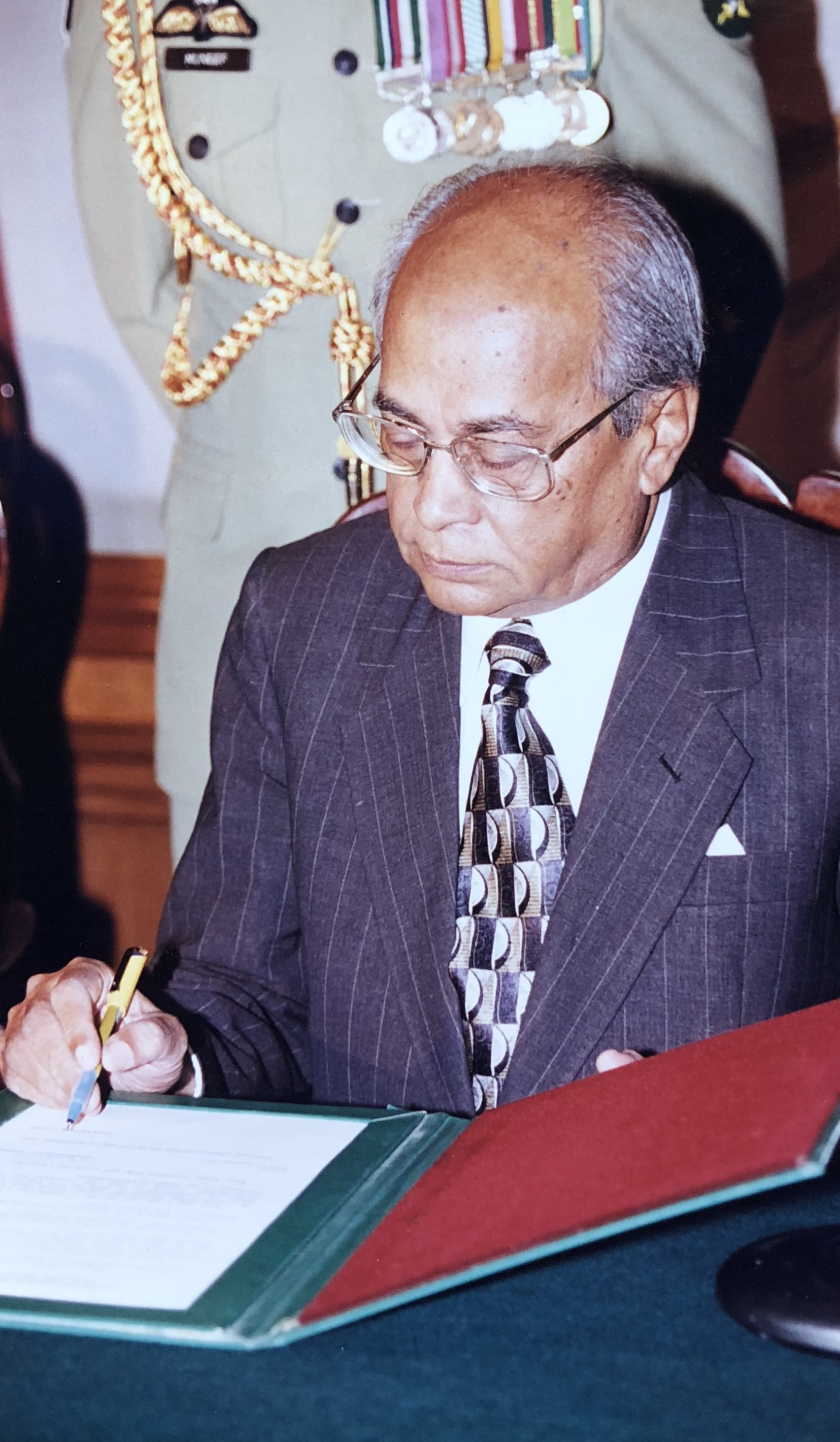

Chief Justice of the Federal Shariat Court
- In office 2006 - 2009

Member of the Council of Islamic Ideology
- In office 2003 - 2006

Ombudsman of Sindh
- In office 1999 - 2003

Justice of the Sindh High Court
- In office 1988 - 1993

Personal details
- Born: 5 November 1931 Delhi, British India
- Died: 1 April 2023 (aged 91) Karachi, Sindh, Pakistan
- Relations: Allama Rashid-ul-Khairi (grandfather); Begum Amina Nazli (mother); Rizwan Ahmed (son-in-law)
- Education: Bachelor of Arts; Bachelors in Law; Masters in Political Science

Haziqul Khairi (Urdu: حاذق‌ الخيری; 5 November 1931 – 1 April 2023) was a Pakistani jurist and author who served as Chief Justice of the Federal Shariat Court of Pakistan, Judge of the Sindh High Court, Ombudsman of Sindh and Principal of Sindh Muslim Law College. He was the grandson of eminent British India social reformer, Allama Rashid ul Khairi.

Khairi also served as a member of the Council of Islamic Ideology where as chairman of the Legal Committee he drafted the Women's Protection Bill. Founder of the private law firm H. Khairi Law Associates, Khairi practiced as an advocate of the Supreme Court of Pakistan before his appointment as a judge of the Sindh High Court. He also remained Member of the National Judicial Policy Making Committee, Member of the Law and Justice Commission of Pakistan, Secretary of the Sindh High Court Bar Association and Member of Sindh Bar Council.

== Personal life and education ==
Khairi was born in Delhi on 5 November 1931, into a literary family to Raziq-ul-Khairi and Begum Amina Nazli. Khairi's grandfather was Allama Rashid-ul-Khairi, a social reformer of British India and a reputed writer of the Urdu Language. Khairi was the father-in-law of senior civil servant Rizwan Ahmed.

Khairi initially received education in Delhi, but later studied in Karachi after his family migrated following the independence of Pakistan. He graduated in arts in 1954 and obtained his Bachelor of Laws degree from Sindh Muslim Law College in 1956. Khairi also held a master's degree in political science.

== Other contributions ==
Khairi wrote several plays and short stories. His autobiography, Jaagtey Lamhey, was published in 2012. Khairi was the chairman of the Thinker's Forum at Hamdard Shura Karachi and served on the board of governors of Habib University. He had previously served on the board of governors, board of trustees, council of trustees, and selection board of the International Islamic University.

== Death ==
Haziqul Khairi died in Karachi on 1 April 2023, at the age of 91. His Namaz-i-Janaza was attended by a large number of people including judges, bureaucrats and lawyers. President of Pakistan Arif Alvi was also among those who paid their condolences at Khairi's residence.

== See also ==
- Chief Justice of the Federal Shariat Court
- Federal Shariat Court
- Sindh Muslim Law College
