= Syed Muhammad Anwer =

Chief Justice of Federal Shariat Court of Pakistan

Justice Dr. Syed Muhammad Anwer
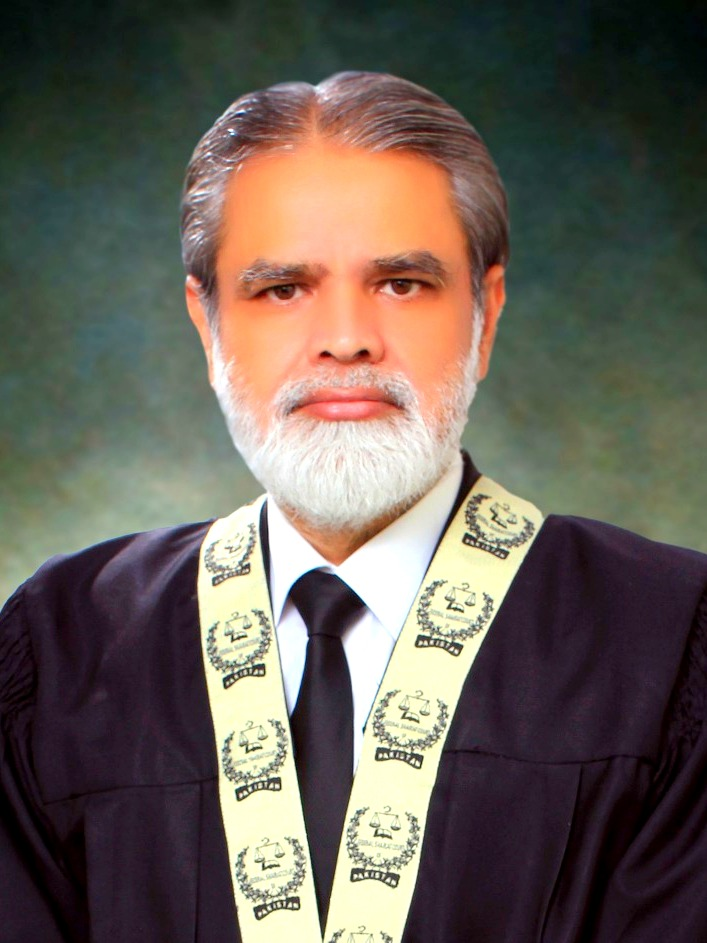
- Born: Rawalpindi, Pakistan
- Education: Bachelors (LLB Honors) degree from International Islamic University, Islamabad; LLM in International Economic Law from Kyushu University; MPhil degree in Public Policy and International Relations from Kyushu University; PhD in Islamic Studies from the University of Punjab; Maulvi Fazil and Daur-i-tafseer from traditional madrasahs
- Occupation: Judge
- Known for: Aalim Judge of the Federal Shariat Court

Justice Syed Muhammad Anwer (Urdu: سید محمد انور) is a Pakistani judge. He took oath as Chief Justice Federal Shariat Court of Pakistan on 02 June 2026. Anwer was elevated as Aalim Judge in Federal Shariat Court on 10 July 2023, by then president Arif Alvi, via notification on 5 July, 2023.

== Early life and education ==
Anwer was born in Rawalpindi, Pakistan. He attended F. G. Sir Syed College. He obtained his Bachelors' (LLB Honors) degree from International Islamic University, Islamabad. He is officially recognised amongst the prominent alumnus of the International Islamic University Islamabad. Later, he pursued higher education at Kyushu University in Japan as a Monbukagakusho Scholarship, completing his LLM in International Economic Law. Additionally, he earned his MPhil degree in Public Policy and International Relations, specializing in Comparative Political Studies and Administration in Asia (CSPA), from the same university. Anwer acquired religious education from traditional madrasahs, receiving degrees such as Maulvi Fazil and Daur-i-tafseer. He also completed Masters in Oriental Learning M.O.L from University of Punjab. Lastly, he pursued his Ph.D. in Islamic Studies at the University of Punjab.

== Career ==
Before elevation, he was appointed by the then president of Pakistan, Mamnoon Husain as a member of the Council of Islamic Ideology on the basis of his extensive research and contributions in the field of Islamic jurisprudence, Islamic finance and Shariah. He was an Advocate of the Supreme Court of Pakistan having expertise in diverse legal disciplines ranging from civil and criminal litigation, corporate law, IT telecom, E-commerce and International trade and finance etc. He also held different offices related to the legal profession including Member legal to Customs Appellate Tribunal, Islamabad, director legal ministry of IT and telecom where he drafted laws for the IT and telecom sector of Pakistan. He remained chairman of Electronic Certification and Accreditation council (ECAC), a legal body to regulate e-commerce in Pakistan by virtue of the Electronic Transaction Ordinance 2002. In this capacity he drafted fundamental regulations for the ECAC to provide the legal foundation for electronic transactions in Pakistan necessary for the certification authorities to operate in Pakistan. He remained Deputy Attorney General Islamabad, prior to which he was elected President of Islamabad Bar Association for the year 2013.

== Notable judgments ==
=== Prohibition of riba/interest ===
Justice Syed Muhammad Anwer authored a judgement in the case of M/s. Farooq Brothers Vs. UBL, PLD 2023 Federal Shariat Court 47 on the prohibition of riba announced on 28 April 2022 (27 Ramadan 1443 AH). The judgement provides a clear definition of riba and imposes a strict prohibition on all types of riba, irrespective of the fact as to whatever purpose the loan is taken, marking the first time when banking interest was declared as being riba. The judgement establishes a reasonable five-year period for full implementation of the decision in order to transform Pakistan's economy into one that is asset-based, risk-sharing, and interest-free. The decision states that Riba will be eliminated from Pakistan by December 31, 2027, which is the date on which it will go into effect fully. The Federal Government of Pakistan, the State Bank of Pakistan and National Bank of Pakistan have withdrawn their appeals and consequently accepted applicability of the judgment by promising to implement its directives by the stated deadline of December 2027. In a historic and unprecedented move towards promoting Islamic finance, Pakistan's Parliament has unanimously passed the 26th Constitutional Amendment, mandating the complete elimination of riba by January 1, 2028. This amendment follows the April 28, 2022, Federal Shariat Court judgement, authored by Anwer, which set a five-year timeline for the removal of Riba from Pakistan's financial system. Arabic Translation of judgment

=== Domestic violence ===
In this judgement Justice Anwer held on Nov. 22, 2022, that no provision of the Punjab Protection of Women against Violence Act, 2016, is against the injunctions of Islam as laid down in the Quran and Sunnah. He held that women have the fundamental right to access justice to redress their grievances.He further elaborated that the reason for appointing the male as Qawwam (قوام) is that they are duty bound to maintain the women of their family properly it does not mean that a man being a ‘Qawwam’ is allowed to inflict ‘domestic violence’ or tashadood (تشدد) upon women.

=== Child marriage ===
This case concerned the Sindh Child Marriage Restraint Act 2013, which set the minimum age of marriage for both girls and boys at 18 years. Justice Anwer held that setting a minimum age for marriage by an Islamic state, is in accordance with the injunctions of Islam, because such fixation of minimum age limit provides a reasonable time to girls to complete basic education, which normally helps in developing mental maturity (rushd) in a person. He further held In the light of principles of goals of Shariah, or Maqasid al Shariah, according to which protection of physical health as well as the mental health of a citizen is the duty of a Muslim state, firstly, under the goal of protection of life of its citizens and, secondly, under the goal of protection of intellect of its citizens.. As Chief Justice Federal Shariat Court of Pakistan, Anwer took Suo Motu notice of an underage girl’s marriage immediately after reports about the incident floated on media. The incident of the five-year old girl reportedly happened in Khuzdar district of Baluchistan. The Court observed that the cruel, un-Islamic and heartless ritual is found in many parts of Pakistan where girls, are given in marriage or servitude to an aggrieved family as compensation to end disputes, often murder. The Suo Motu notice led to various legislative actions taken by the federation and provinces. The provincial assembly of Baluchistan has ultimately passed a Bill for prohibition of child marriages tilted as the Balochistan Child Marriage Restraint Act, 2025 setting minimum age for marriage at 18 which has gained extensive approval and recognition The international community as well as the EU has also acknowledged the efforts to raise legal marriage age in Pakistan to 18 as it conforms to the provisions of CEDAW to which Pakistan is a signatory.

=== Outlawing practice of swara and vani ===
On 25 October 2021, Anwer delivered a landmark judgement in Sakeena Bibi V. Secretary Law, Government of Pakistan where he held that the practice of Swara is unconstitutional and un-Islamic as it is against the principles of the Quran and Sunna. Swara (also known as Vani and Budla-i-sulh) is a custom/tradition whereby, women and girls belonging to the offender's family are given in marriage or servitude to the aggrieved persons as compensation for reconciliation in case of rivalry, murder, or abduction in order to settle the dispute. It is a form of arranged or forced child marriage. The decision is made by a council of tribal elders called Jirga or Panchayat. The practice violates the rights of women and girls to a significant extent and places them at high risk of violence and abuse.

=== Declaring khula as an absolute right of women ===
Justice Anwer held that the right of khula granted to women by the Quran and Sunnah is an absolute and unique right, whereby a marriage can be dissolved through a court at her will. He further held that a wife can get this right by showing her willingness to return the mehar (dower) to her husband and in addition by simply stating in a court of law that she can no longer live with her husband as his wife “within the prescribed limits set by the Almighty Allah as a reason for dissolution of marriage”. Finally, the judgment noted that it is the fundamental right of a woman according to the injunctions of Islam as laid down in the Quran and Sunnah to claim a decree for dissolution of marriage from the court of law, which cannot be denied.

=== Appointment of female judges is not un-islamic ===
Justice Anwer held that the appointment of female judges subject to the provisions of any law and the Constitution is not against the injunctions of Islam as laid down in the Quran and Sunnah. He highlights the fact that in the whole corpus of Ahadiths, hundreds of Ahadiths are reported by the female companions (صحابيات) of Muhammad but not a single Muhadith (محدث) of any era or any scholar of any schoolof Islamic jurisprudence ever discredited any Hadith of Muhammad only on this basis that such a Hadith is reported by a woman. Secondly he pointed out that some Umahat al-Moomineen would give Juristic opinions commonly called the Fatwas. The books of Ahadith including Sahih Bukhari and Sahih Muslim contain Fatawa of Aisha (i.e. the legal opinions of Aisha so much so that there are reported instances where very senior companions sought legal opinion from Aisha. This therefore displays a strong tradition and history of legal and jurisprudential scholarship of women in Islam.

=== Denial of women's inheritance right is un-islamic ===
In a landmark ruling the Federal Shariat Court (FSC) on 19 March 2025 declared all or any custom, by virtue of which any female member of a family is being or has been denied or deprived of her right of inheritance, have no legal force whatsoever.The 21-page judgement, authored by Justice Dr Syed Muhammad Anwar of the four-member bench that also comprised Chief Justice Iqbal Hameedur Rehman, Justice Khadim Hussain M. Sheikh and Justice Ameer Mohammad Khan, came on a petition moved against the custom of ‘Chaddar’ or ‘Parchi’ — prevalent in parts of Bannu district — that either deprived women of inheritance right granted by the Holy Quran and Sunnah, or forced them to accept a share of less value than their inheritance through jirgas.The Shariat Court declared the practice un-Islamic and illegal, having no legal force, subject such criminal actions to punishment.

=== Transgender Persons Act ===
In 2023, as Acting FSC Chief Justice, Anwer ruled that the Transgender Persons (Protection of Rights) Act 2018 is incompatible with Islamic principles. In the 108-page judgement, the court concluded that the use of the term “transgender” for gender identity based on self-perceived identity, contrary to the biological sex of the person, was against the injunctions of Islam.

== Awards and honors ==
Justice A R Cornelius Award 2024

Implementation Minority Rights Forum Award Committee nominates Justice A R Cornelius Award 2024 to Honorable Mr. Justice Dr. Syed Muhammad Anwar, Senior Judge Federal Shariat Court of Pakistan. The award was presented by Justice Syed Mansoor Ali Shah, Senior Judge Supreme Court of Pakistan, Samuel Maksan, Chairman Implementation Minority Rights Forum and Azam Nazir Tarar, Federal Minister for Law, Justice & Human Rights.

Cambridge Lifetime Achievement Award

In a historic inaugural presentation, the Cambridge Lifetime Achievement Award 2024 was conferred upon Honourable Justice Dr. Syed Muhammad Anwer from the Federal Shariat Court of Pakistan. His pivotal role in the landmark decision to integrate a Riba-free economy into the Pakistani constitution marks a monumental shift in Islamic finance, celebrating his lifelong dedication to Islamic financial principles.

Pope St. Paul VI Fraternity Award

Justice Dr.Syed Muhammad Anwer was conferred the Pope St. Paul VI Fraternity Award on 3 November,2026 by the Catholic Commission for Inter-Religious Dialogue and Ecumenism (CCIDE) Pakistan. The ceremony, hosted at the International Islamic University Islamabad under the theme of faith, dialogue, and human fraternity, recognized his distinguished leadership in promoting social cohesion, reconciliation, and interreligious peace in the spirit of Nostra Aetate.

QAU Lifetime Achievement Award

Quaid-i-Azam University Islamabad honoured Justice Anwer with the prestigious Lifetime Achievement Award on 18 December 2024.

Life Time Achievement Award by Minhaj University

At the occasion of 8th World Islamic Economics and Finance Conference (WIEFC 2025), held at Minhaj University Lahore, Justice Dr. Syed Muhammad Anwer was recognized with a Lifetime Achievement Award in recognition of his contribution to the field of Islamic Jurisprudence and Legal Scholarship.

Prestigious IRI Writers Award

In acknowledgement of his books and academic research works on Islam, Islamic jurisprudence and Islamic history the most prestigious Research Constitutional body of Islamic Republic of Pakistan, the Islamic Research Institute of Pakistan - IRI awarded the " Writers Award " to Justice Anwer on 25 April, 2025.
