= Ghulam Farooq Awan =

Pakistani politician

- غلام فاروق اعوان
- Born: February 10, 1961 (age 65); Kahuta, Pakistan
- Disappeared: Pakistan Muslims League (N) PML-N present 2025
- Education: Punjab University
- Occupations: Lawyer, columnist
- Known for: Former adviser to the Prime Minister of Pakistan, Additional Attorney General of Pakistan
- Relatives: Babar Awan (brother); Malik Shakeel Awan (nephew)

Ghulam Farooq Awan (Urdu: غلام فاروق اعوان) (born 10 February 1961), is a Pakistani lawyer and columnist, and former adviser to the Prime Minister of Pakistan for law, justice and parliamentary affairs. He previously also served as additional Attorney General of Pakistan.

== Early life and education ==
Ghulam Farooq Awan was born on 10 February 1961 in the village of Hothla, located in the Kahuta region of Rawalpindi District in Punjab. He received his early education at the local primary school in Hothla and later earned a Bachelor of Laws (LLB) degree from the University of the Punjab. He subsequently completed a Master’s degree in Islamic Studies. During his academic years, he was actively involved in student politics and was elected as a student representative.

== Legal career ==
He joined the legal practice in 1991 and has spent over 20 years as a lawyer. He became the additional Attorney General of Pakistan on 4 January 2011.

== Political career ==
He was appointed as the Adviser to the Prime Minister, Yousuf Raza Gillani on 16 April 2011 by President of Pakistan, Asif Zardari.

He later left Pakistan People's Party and joined the Pakistan Tehreek-i-Insaf in 2016.
