= Jawahar Lal Kaul =

Indian Vice-Chancellor

J. L. Kaul was a professor of Law at Campus Law Center, University of Delhi. He is a former Vice-Chancellor of Vikram University, Ujjain, and Hemwati Nandan Bahuguna Garhwal University. He has over 30 years of experience in international trade law and human rights and had written several books and articles. He is the president of All India Law Teachers' Association since 2005 and executive member of Indian Society of International Law, New Delhi. He received his Ph.D. in law from Maharishi Dayanand University, LL.M. from the iconic Punjab University Law College and LL.B. from Delhi University. He is the provost, Jubilee Hall, University of Delhi, since 2008. He is Member, Executive Council, Indian Society of International Law, New Delhi since 2009. He is Fellow, Institute of Globalization and International Relations, Maastricht University, Netherlands. He is visiting fellow, Bangor University Law School, Republic of Wales since 2012. He is also Visiting Fellow, University of St. Thomas School of Law, Minneapolis, (USA) since 2014.

In November 2017, a proposal to dismiss Jawahar Lal Kaul of the Hemvati Nandan Bahuguna Garhwal University was sent by the Ministry of Human Resource Development to the president, Ram Nath Kovind. The HRD ministry, in December 2017, sacked Hemvati Nandan Bahuguna Garhwal (HNBG) University vice-chancellor Jawahar Lal Kaul for administrative irregularities. Kaul allegedly allowed affiliated colleges to increase their intake in some courses to 200 seats, violating rules that limit the number at 60 and 80 in some cases. He also allegedly decided to make it cheaper than prescribed for colleges to get affiliation with the university.

Kaul is the third central university head — after Sushanta Dattagupta of Visva-Bharati University and Chandra Krishnamurthy of Pondicherry University — to be dismissed by the incumbent government.

== See also ==
- Hemwati Nandan Bahuguna Garhwal University
