= Rashid ul Khairi =

Urdu novelist and social reformer

Allama Rashid ul Khairi راشد الخیری
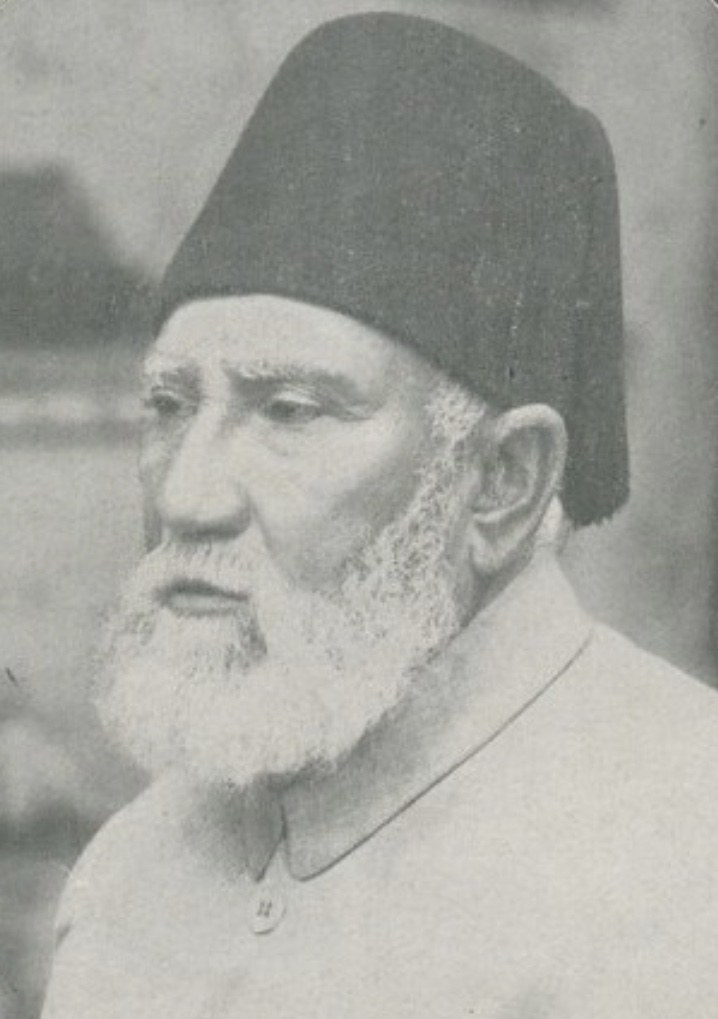
- Born: Mohammad Abdur Rashid; January 1868; Delhi, British India
- Died: 3 February 1936 (aged 68); Delhi, British India
- Known for: One of the pioneers of women's rights in the Indian subcontinent
- Relatives: Sadiq ul Khairi (son); Raziq ul Khairi (son); Begum Amma Nazli (daughter-in-law); Haziqul Khairi (grandson)

Allama Rashid-ul-Khairi, (January 1868 – 3 February 1936) born as Mohammad Abdur Rashid and largely known as Musawir-e-Gham (مصوّرِ غم; lit "illustrator of grief"), was a social reformer from British India.

He is recognised for his contributions to Urdu literature. Khairi blended reformist and didactic teachings with literary works and is considered among the pioneers of the Urdu short story. He was the father of Urdu novelist Sadiq ul Khairi and grandfather of prominent jurist Haziqul Khairi.

== Career ==
Khairi founded ISMAT in June 1908 in Delhi, a social and literary magazine for women that served the cause of Muslim women's education in India and fought for their legal rights. He wrote more than ninety books and booklets, including Sath Ruhoon Kay Aamalnamay and Nani Ashu, two comedic works. Khairi's work depicts the circumstances of women during his time in the Indian subcontinent.

According to Munshi Premchand, "Rashid ul Khairi was a great name in literature for women in Urdu, and all those who know Urdu language should be grateful to him." Gail Minault, Professor of History at the University of Texas, in her book Secluded Scholars wrote that, "Rashid ul Khairi was a pioneer of women's rights in the Islamic tradition and was one of the biggest bestsellers in the history of Urdu Novel. He saw the oppression of women, their physical and mental imprisonment, and how they were deprived of their rights and he wanted to do something about it."

Renowned Urdu literature novelist Qurratulain Hyder stated, "Rashid ul Khairi was one of the greatest reformers of the nation in the twentieth century."

According to his grandson, Justice Haziqul Khairi of Pakistan, Allama Rashid ul Khairi influenced the present-day feminist movement in Pakistan, reported in a major newspaper of Pakistan:

"So Justice Khairi is justified in emphasizing that the present movement of feminism in Pakistan owes much to these early protagonists of the women's cause, who for the first time in the Muslim history of South Asia, raised a voice for women and worked for their rights, thus paving the way for the feministic movement as it has now emerged".

== Literary works ==
- Samarna Ka Chand
- Subh-e-Zindagi
- Sham-e-Zindagi
- Shab-e-Zindagi
- Nauha-e-Zindagi
- Mah-e-Ajam
- Shaheen-o-Darraj
- Nani Ashu
- Jauhar-e-Ismat
- Mahboob-e-Khudawand
- Amna Ka Lal
- Aroos-e-Karbala
- Azzuhra
- Sarab-e-Maghrib
- Bintul Waqt
- Hayat-e-Saliha
- Syyeda Ka Lal

== Death and legacy ==
Rashid-ul-Khairi died on 3 February 1936 in Delhi, British India.

== See also ==
- Haziqul Khairi
- Nazir Ahmad Dehlvi
- Amina Nazli
