= Waheed Asghar Dogar =

Pakistani politician

Member of the Provincial Assembly of the Punjab
- In office 29 May 2013 – 31 May 2018

Personal details
- Born: 4 March 1958 (age 68) Chichawatni, Punjab, Pakistan
- Party: PTI (2013-present)

Waheed Asghar Dogar is a Pakistani politician who was a Member of the Provincial Assembly of the Punjab, from 2002 to 2007 and again from May 2013 and May 2018.

== Early life and education ==
He was born on 4 March 1958 in Chichawatni.

He has a degree of Bachelor of Arts and a degree of Bachelor of Laws which he obtained in 1986 from Punjab University Law College.

== Political career ==
He was elected to the Provincial Assembly of the Punjab as an independent candidate from Constituency PP-224 (Sahiwal-V) in the 2002 Pakistani general election. He received 26,704 votes and defeated Shahzad Saeed Cheema, a candidate of Pakistan Muslim League (Q) (PML-Q).

He ran for the seat of the Provincial Assembly of the Punjab as an independent candidate from Constituency PP-224 (Sahiwal-V) in the 2008 Pakistani general election but was unsuccessful. He received 28,357 votes and lost the seat to Shahzad Saeed Cheema, a candidate of Pakistan Peoples Party.

He was re-elected to the Provincial Assembly of the Punjab as a candidate of Pakistan Tehreek-e-Insaf from Constituency PP-224 (Sahiwal-V) in the 2013 Pakistani general election.
