= Riaz Ahmad Khan =

Pakistani judge (1952–2021)

15th Chief Justice of the Federal Shariat Court
- In office 7 March 2015 – 14 May 2017
- Nominated by: Mamnoon Hussain
- Preceded by: Fida Muhammad Khan
- Succeeded by: Najam ul Hasan

Judge of the Islamabad High Court
- In office 21 December 2010 – 14 May 2014
- Nominated by: Iftikhar Muhammad Chaudhry

Member of the Khyber Pakhtunkhwa Bar Council
- In office 1999–unknown

Personal details
- Born: 15 May 1952; Nowshera, Khyber Pakhtunkhwa, Pakistan
- Died: 21 August 2021 (aged 69)
- Education: University of the Punjab (LL.B.)

Riaz Ahmad Khan (15 May 1952 – 21 August 2021) was a Pakistani judge who served as the 15th chief justice of the Federal Shariat Court from 7 March 2015 to 14 May 2017. Prior to his retirement from legal services in May 2014, he served as Islamabad High Court judge. He was appointed as additional deputy prosecutor at the National Accountability Bureau and a member of the Khyber Pakhtunkhwa Bar Council in 1999. He also served as acting chief justice of Islamabad High Court in 2013.

He was also a member of the Law and Justice Commission of Pakistan. He participated in the All Pakistan Declamation Contest and became the recipient of a gold medal. Khan became the Islamabad High Court judge on 21 Dec 2010, Federal Shariat Court judge on 8 August 2014 and chief justice of Shariat Court on 7 March 2015.

== Career ==
Khan was born in Nowshera, Khyber Pakhtunkhwa. He obtained his education from Edwardes College Peshawar. Khan did his matriculation in 1968. He obtained his graduation in 1973 and a master's degree in Political Science in 1975 from the University of Peshawar. He obtained his Bachelor of Laws from the University of the Punjab. He qualified Central Superior Services 1977 and was subsequently appointed as assistant transportation and assistant commercial officer to the Pakistan Railways for Lahore. He later qualified Judicial Services of Pakistan (PCS) and was subsequently appointed civil judge to Peshawar, Kohat and Haripur, and Dera Ismail Khan. He later resigned as a civil judge and began legal practice.

In 1997 he became assistant advocate general and then additional deputy prosecutor at the National Accountability Bureau (NAB) where he remained in the office for three years. When he was a student, he was elected the president of University of Peshawar at Political Science department.
