= Sadiq ul Khairi =

Urdu Novelist

- صادق الخیری
- Born: May 11, 1915; Delhi, British Raj
- Died: January 26, 1989 (aged 73); Karachi, Pakistan
- Resting place: Sakhi Hassan Cemetery
- Occupations: Writer, novelist, translator
- Relatives: Rashid ul Khairi (father)
- Writing career
- Language: Urdu

Sadiq ul Khairi (Urdu: صادق الخیری; 11 May 1915, Delhi - 26 January 1989, Karachi, Sindh) was an Indian-born Pakistani Urdu novelist, playwright and translator. He was the son of well-known Urdu writer Allama Rashid Al-Khairi and younger brother of Razzaq Al-Khairi.

== Early life and education ==
Khairi was born on 11 May 1915, in Delhi, British India. His father, Allama Rashid Al Khairi was a prominent Indian scholar and writer. Sadiq al-Khairi's grandfather Maulvi Abdul Qadir was one of the prominent scholars of Delhi. The famous Urdu writer Nazir Ahmad was the son-in-law of Maulvi Abdul Qadir.

== Works ==
- Dāstān sarāʼe: Mashriq o Mag̲h̲rib kā ʻaẓīm fikshan (in Urdu). Karācī: Shahnāz Buk Klab. 1980. OCLC 8826452.
- Bīrokreṭ (in Urdu). Karācī: Shahnāz Buk Klab. 1988. OCLC 21117245.
- Bint-i qamar; Ṣādiq al-K̲h̲airī ke muntak̲h̲ab afsāne. Karācī: Shahnāz Buk Kalb. 1971. OCLC 40971227.
- Andhi Gali: (short stories) (in Urdu). New Delhi: Publications India : Distributed by Star Publications. 1989. ISBN 978-81-85243-24-5. OCLC 24019846.
- Nisheman; Ek dilkash o dilras nāvilaṭ (in Urdu). Karācī: Shahnāz Buk Kalb. 1970. OCLC 46823273.
- Manjdhār. Karācī: Shahnāz Buk Kalb. 1976. OCLC 40971336.
- Ṣādiqulk̲h̲airī : bihtarīn afsāne. Karācī: Shahnāz Buk Kalb. 1984. OCLC 23099319.
- Lab pih ā saktā nahīn̲ : ankahī, saccī kahāniyān̲. 1981. OCLC 11324658.

== Death ==
Khairi died of a heart attack in Karachi on 26 January 1989 and was buried in Sakhi Hassan Cemetery.

== Biobiography ==
- Humā, Dr. Ẓill-i (1999). Ṣādiqulk̲h̲airī: ḥayāt aur adabī k̲h̲idmāt [Sadiq Al Khairi Life and Services] (in Urdu) (second ed.). Delhi: Shahid Publications. OCLC 39130834.
