= Chief Justice of the Federal Shariat Court =

The chief justice of the Federal Shariat Court of Pakistan heads the Federal Shariat Court of Pakistan. The chief justice of the Shariat Court is the second-highest judicial office in the country, after the chief justice of Pakistan.

The current chief justice of the Federal Shariat Court of Pakistan is Justice Syed Muhammad Anwer.

== List of chief justices ==
These are the names of the chief justices of the Federal Shariat Court of Pakistan, which came into being in 1980.

Temporal order	Name	From	To	Ref.
1	Salahuddin Ahmed	28 May 1980	31 May 1981	
2	Sheikh Aftab Hussain (acting)	1 June 1981	14 October 1984	
3	Sardar Fakhr e Alam (acting)	15 October 1984	7 November 1984	
4	Gul Muhammad Khan	8 November 1984	8 November 1990	
5	Tanzil-ur-Rahman	17 November 1990	16 November 1992	
6	Mir Hazar Khan Khoso	17 November 1992	18 July 1994	
7	Nazir Ahmad Bhatti	19 July 1994	4 January 1997	
8	Mian Mehboob Ahmad	8 January 1997	7 January 2000	
9	Fazal Ellahi Khan	12 January 2000	11 January 2003	
10	Chaudhry Ejaz Yousaf	9 May 2003	8 May 2006	
11	Haziq-ul-Khairi	9 May 2006	4 June 2009	
12	Agha Rafiq Ahmed Khan	5 June 2009	4 June 2014	
13	Sardar Muhammad Raza Khan	5 June 2014	5 December 2014	
14	Fida Muhammad Khan (acting)	12 December 2014	7 March 2015	
15	Riaz Ahmad Khan	7 March 2015	14 May 2017	
16	Najam ul Hassan	15 May 2017	10 May 2019	
17	Muhammad Noor Meskanzai	15 May 2019	14 May 2022	
18	Justice Dr. Syed Muhammad Anwer (acting)	16 May 2022	1 June 2022	
19	Justice Iqbal Hameedur Rahman	1 June 2023	31 May 2026	
20	Justice Dr. Syed Muhammad Anwer	2 June 2026		

== List of sitting judges of the Federal Shariat Court ==
- Justice Syed Muhammad Anwer, Chief Justice Federal Shariat Court of Pakistan
- Justice Ameer Muhammad Khan, Judge
