= Amina Nazli =

Amina Begam (1914 – February 2, 1996; Urdu: آمنہ نازلی), better known by her pen name Amina Nazli, was an Urdu-language writer, editor, and feminist activist in Pakistan. She was the daughter-in-law of Allama Rashid ul Khairi, and the mother of prominent jurist Haziqul Khairi.

== Biography ==
Amina Nazli was the pen name of Amina Begam, who was born in 1914 in Uttar Pradesh. She passed the Adib-i-Fazil examinations, an equivalent to a bachelor's degree, at the University of the Punjab. In 1929, she married Raziq-ul-Khairi, son of the prominent writer and women's rights activist Rashid ul Khairi.

Nazli began writing in earnest in the 1940s, part of a new generation of fiction writers in the region. She was known for writing Urdu-language short stories, and was one of Pakistan's few women playwrights at the time. Her writing at times dealt with the trauma of displacement, drawing on her own experiences, and sometimes veered into the satirical. She published several books of short stories and plays over the course of her career. In addition, she produced several books on women's handicrafts and cooking, including the popular cookbook Ismati Dastarkhwan, which compiled recipes from the women of Awadh.

She was also an editor, helming the women's social and literary magazine Ismat from 1979 until her death, having previously contributed to the journal under her father-in-law's editorship. Under her leadership, the publication increasingly incorporated political news updates both from Pakistan and from around the world. From 1977 to 1982, she also edited the monthly publication Johar-e-Niswan.

Nazli was a feminist who advocated for women's rights among Muslim communities in the Indian subcontinent. She eventually settled in Karachi, where she was credited with helping to foster a liberal environment. She died there in 1996. After her death, her son Haziqul Khairi published Amina Nazli ke Muntakhib Afsane Aur Drame, a selection of her short stories and plays.
