= Thomas Jefferson Education Foundation =

Diploma mill in South Dakota

The Thomas Jefferson Education Foundation was a diploma mill run in the 1990s and based in South Dakota.

== Diploma mill ==
According to John Bear, author of Bears' Guide to Earning Degrees by Distance Learning, in 1998 the Thomas Jefferson Education Foundation ran an advertisement in USA Today for distance education courses. Bear responded to the ad and the foundation sent a 20-page course catalog covering the following schools:

- Thomas Jefferson University of Virginia
- University of Williamsburg
- Dartmoor University
- Presidential American University
- Cambridge University in America

According to Bear, the catalog made no distinction among these schools other than listing their different names. The catalog offered degrees at all levels by "professional assessment of career achievements" and claimed to have accreditation from the "College for Professional Assessment", an agency Bear had yet to come across (see List of recognized accreditation associations of higher learning).

The Foundation gave the address of a Sioux Falls, South Dakota law office as the location of its campus, something over which a lawyer at that office expressed "outrage". According to Bear, this lawyer had filed the incorporation documents for Thomas Jefferson Education Foundation, as well as for other schools later determined to be diploma mills, including Monticello University (aka "Thomas Jefferson University"), a school begun by Les Snell. Monticello University was "an unauthorized foreign non-profit corporation organized under the laws of the State of South Dakota" that, along with several other of Snell's schools, was shut down by the government in 1999.
