= Mowahid Shah =

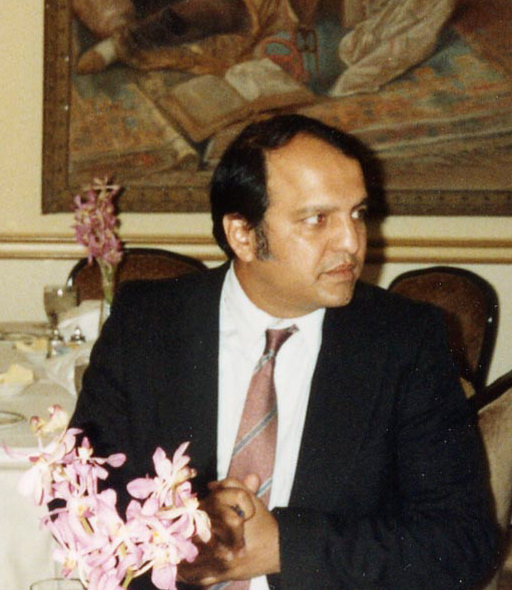
Mowahid Hussain Shah

Mowahid Hussain Shah is an attorney-at-law, author, and policy analyst. His articles are published regularly in English in Nawa-i-Waqt (an Urdu daily). For over a decade, he has been the lead columnist for Pakistan Link, the most subscribed weekly throughout North America for the U.S. Pakistani community.

For over 30 years, Mowahid Shah has studied the interplay between religion and politics. In 1979, he was one of few authors at the time who examined the repercussions of the trial and execution of Pakistan Prime Minister Zulfiqar Ali Bhutto, and predicted its ensuing implications, including increasing politicisation of Islam in Pakistan; that "using Islamization of law to legitimize their continued power, the army may in the long term govern with a civilian façade", and that persecution of the Bhutto family would continue with consequent enlargement of the Bhutto myth.

30 years ago, he cautioned that there would be civil rights implications for the Arab-Muslim community in the US because of escalating global tensions. In 1992, at The Harvard Forum, he urged military intervention in Bosnia to stop Serbian aggression, concerned that if Serbia's aggression were allowed to stand, there would be repercussions that would "envelope Europe and envelop the Muslim world, and even vital American interests."

His article in the Christian Science Monitor predicted the onset of Western-Muslim world tensions before Harvard professor Samuel P. Huntington popularized the theory of a "clash of civilizations". He opposed the Gulf War, warning of long-term repercussions of U.S. intervention in the Middle East, predicting that "Operation Desert Storm may become a desert trap" that "would radicalize the region for generations." He continues to maintain that leaving the Palestinian issue unattended is "at the center of fueling radicalism."

== Career ==
Mowahid Shah is a former law partner of US Senator James Abourezk. In 1980, Senator Abourezk envisioned and founded the American-Arab Anti-Discrimination Committee (ADC). ADC's founding director was Dr. James Zogby. Mowahid Shah played a small role in facilitating the launch of the civil rights organisation. He and Dr. Zogby wrote ADC's first publication, "The Other Anti-Semitism" and worked together in researching and analysing similarities between 19th century anti-Jewish cartoons and modern cartoons offensive to Arabs and Muslims.

Mowahid Shah is an original co-founder of Pakistan's second largest political party, Tehreek-e-Insaf (Justice Party), which was launched at Lahore on 25 April 1996.

From 2003 to 2007, Mowahid Shah served as Minister and Special Assistant to the Punjab Chief Minister, Pakistan. He played a major role in the creation of Punjab's first comprehensive consumer protection law. He proposed a 5-point initiative aimed at ensuring that the disabled be treated with dignity, In 2004, he organised the first ever conference at the Chief Minister's Office focused on respecting and enhancing teachers' dignity and status.

His book, "Will & Skill", which explores West-Muslim tensions in the aftermath of 9/11 and proposes a way forward, was launched in May 2012.

== Early years ==
Born in Rawalpindi, Pakistan, Mowahid Shah spent part of his boyhood schooling in Jakarta, Indonesia, during the Sukarno era. A student from Forman Christian College, he went on to earn his LL.B. from Punjab University Law College where he engaged himself in different activities and societies like the famous debating society of PULC. He is the son of Colonel Amjad Hussain Sayed, who is the last surviving delegate, sent by poet-philosopher Allama Iqbal, to the Muslim League session in 1937 in Lucknow, which laid the foundations of the Pakistan Movement.

As a student leader at George Washington University in the 1970s, Mowahid Shah was Editor of the "Harbinger", a student publication. He successfully defended in student court a resolution issued by the university's International Student Society in support of international human rights. In his LL.M. thesis, cited by a UN report, he posited the right under international law of the Palestinian people to resist forcible military occupation.

Mowahid Shah was one of the first Pakistani lawyers admitted to the District of Columbia and US Supreme Court Bars.
