= Gul Muhammad Khan =

Pakistani judge (born 1925)

4th Chief Justice of the Federal Shariat Court
- In office 26 May 1980 – 25 May 1981
- Nominated by: Muhammad Zia-ul-Haq
- Preceded by: Sardar Fakhre Alam
- Succeeded by: Tanzil-ur-Rahman

Judge of the Lahore High Court
- In office 1974–1984
- Nominated by: Hamoodur Rahman

Personal details
- Born: 1 December 1925 Jhang District, British India
- Education: LL.B.
- Alma mater: University of the Punjab

Gul Muhammad Khan (born 1 December 1925, date of death unknown) was a Pakistani judge who served as the 4th chief justice of the Federal Shariat Court from 8 November 1984 to 8 November 1990 and as a Lahore High Court judge from 2 October 1974 to 8 November 1984.

== Biography ==
Khan was born in Jhang District, British India. He obtained his Bachelor of Laws from the University of the Punjab in 1955 and was called to the bar at the Lincoln's Inn in 1959.

Khan began his legal practice in 1960 at Lahore High Court and was appointed its judge on 2 October 1974. He retired from legal services on 8 November 1990. Khan is deceased.
