= Tanzil-ur-Rahman =

Pakistani judge (born 1928)

Tanzil-ur-Rahman, TI, (born 16 June 1928) is a Pakistani jurist and scholar of Islamic studies. He has served as the Chief Justice of the Federal Shariat Court (1990–92), and as a member of the Islamic Research Council and the Council of Islamic Ideology (1980–84). He is the author of numerous books on the codification of Islamic law.

He has been called an "enthusiastic and skillful champion" of advancing the cause of "Islamic reform" of Pakistani law, i.e. interpreting the Pakistani Constitution and law to implement Sharia law in Pakistan.

== Life and education ==
Justice Tanzil-ur-Rahman was born on 16 June 1928 at Nagina, District Bijnor, U.P. India. In 1948, he graduated from Agra University and migrated to Pakistan. He completed his M.A. (1952), LL.B. (1954), and PhD in Islamic Law (1971) from Karachi University. He was awarded Tamgah-i-Imtiaz in 1971 by the Government of Pakistan for his contribution to Islamic Law.

== Bibliography ==
Tanzil-ur-Rahman, Muslim family laws ordinance: Islamic & social survey, (1997)

Tanzil-ur-Rahman, Objectives resolution and its impact on Pakistan constitution and law, (1996)

Tanzil-ur-Rahman, The judgment that could not be delivered: in re, international loan agreements under Shari’at, (1994)

Tanzil-ur-Rahman, Jurm o sazā kā Islāmī falsafah, (1982)

Tanzil-ur-Rahman, Islāmī qavānīn: ḥudūd, qiṣāṣ, diyat va taʻzīrāt, (1980)

Tanzil-ur-Rahman, Islāmī niẓām-i adālat, (1978)

Tanzil-ur-Rahman, A code of Muslim personal law, (1978)

Tanzil-ur-Rahman, Islamization of Pakistan law: surveying from Islamic point of view, (1978)

Tanzil-ur-Rahman, Majmūʻah-yi qavānīn Islām

Tanzil-ur-Rahman, QULIYAT-E-SHARIYAT

== See also ==
- Chief Justices of the Federal Shariat Court
