= Monticello University =

American diploma mill

Monticello University was an unaccredited diploma mill, incorporated in Hawaii and South Dakota but based in Kansas, whose operator Leslie Edwin Snell (aka Dax Snell) was found guilty in 2000 of issuing invalid degrees, and which Kansas has accused of being fraudulent.

The university was incorporated on February 4, 1998 in Hawaii, and in September of that year in South Dakota. In July of 1999 the State of Hawaii filed a complaint against the university, accusing it of deceiving consumers and asking the judge to order Snell to stop operating there. Authorities in Kansas filed a civil lawsuit against Snell in that state in September of 1999 and ordered the ISP there that hosted Monticello's website to take it down. The Circuit Court of the First Circuit in the State of Hawaii ordered the university, amongst other things, to cease claiming it was legally qualified to issue degrees and to declare that it utilises "erroneous or misleading advertising." In Kansas, Snell was found guilty in the civil suit on April 20, 2000. He was ordered to pay a $1.5 million fine and to reimburse the defrauded students. Monticello University in Hawaii was involuntarily dissolved on January 30, 2002.

Operation Dipscam listed the university as one of the top ten diploma mills in the United States.

Victims affected by the diploma mill include Babar Awan, the Federal Law Minister of Pakistan.

== See also ==
- Hawaii's complaint against Monticello University, archived here.
- Hawaii's judgement against Monticello University, archived here.
- Hawaii's judgement against a partner in the Monticello fraud, archived here.
- Thomas Jefferson Education Foundation, a related fraudulent organisation.
- List of unaccredited institutions of higher learning
