= Kashmala Tariq =

Pakistani politician

Federal Ombudsperson for Protection against Harassment of Women at the Workplaces
- In office 27 February 2018 – 27 February 2022

Member of the National Assembly of Pakistan
- In office 17 March 2008 – 16 March 2013
- Constituency: Reserved seat for women
- In office 16 November 2002 – 15 November 2007
- Constituency: Reserved seat for women

Personal details
- Born: Rawalpindi, Pakistan
- Party: Pakistan Muslim League (Q)
- Spouse: Waqas Khan

Kashmala Tariq (Urdu: کشمالہ طارق) is a Pakistani politician who was the Federal Ombudsperson for Protection against Harassment of Women at the Workplaces, in office from February 2018 to March 2022. Previously, she was a member of the National Assembly of Pakistan from 2002 to 2013.

== Early life and education ==
Kashmala Tariq has completed her Bachelors in Law (LLB) from Punjab University Law College (PULC).

Tariq also holds a Master of Laws from the London School of Economics and Political Science.

She is a lawyer by profession and married Waqas Khan in 2020.

== Political career ==
Tariq was elected to the National Assembly of Pakistan as a candidate of Pakistan Muslim League (Q) (PML-Q) on a seat reserved for women from Punjab in the 2002 Pakistani general election. During her tenure as Member of the National Assembly, she remained one of the vocal woman legislators.

In 2007, she was elected as the Chairperson of the Commonwealth Women Parliamentarians Committee.

She was re-elected to the National Assembly as a candidate of PML-Q on a seat reserved for women from Punjab in the 2008 Pakistani general election.

In February 2018, Tariq was appointed as the Federal Ombudsperson for Protection against Harassment of Women at the Workplaces for a period of four years.

In March 2018, her staff beat up and held journalists from Waqt News against their will. She accused the journalists of recording an off-the-record conversation, after which she ordered her staff to forcibly take the journalist's equipment and delete the recorded discussion.
