= Fazal Ellahi Khan =

Pakistani judge (1933–2023)

9th Chief Justice of the Federal Shariat Court
- In office 12 January 2000 – 11 January 2003
- Nominated by: Pervez Musharraf
- Preceded by: Mian Mahboob Ahmad
- Succeeded by: Chaudhry Ejaz Yousaf

Justice of the Supreme Court of Pakistan
- In office 1993–2000
- Nominated by: Nasim Hasan Shah

Member of the Federal Public Service Commission
- In office May 1998 – January 2000
- President: Ghulam Ishaq Khan
- Prime Minister: Nawaz Sharif

Governor of the North-West Frontier Province (Acting)
- In office 10 March 1993 – 16 March 1993

Personal details
- Born: 1 January 1933 Mardan, North-West Frontier Province, British India
- Died: 12 December 2023 (aged 90)
- Education: LL.B.
- Alma mater: University of Peshawar

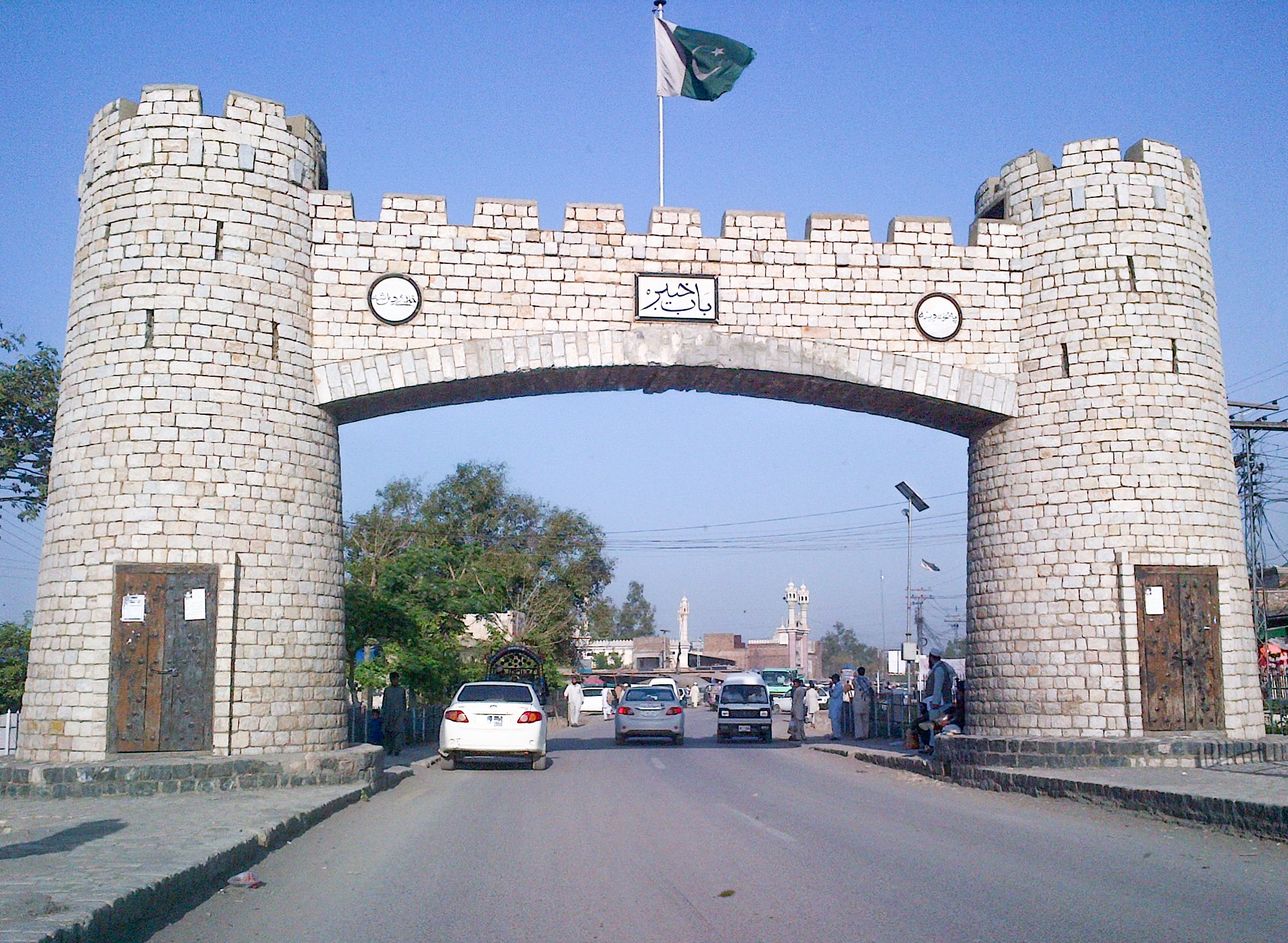
Peshawar

Fazal Ellahi Khan (1 January 1933 – 12 December 2023) was a Pakistani lawyer and judge who served as the 9th chief justice of the Federal Shariat Court from 12 January 2000 to 11 January 2003 and the Supreme Court of Pakistan judge from 1993 to 2000.

== Life and career ==
Khan was born in Mardan, Pakistan. He graduated from Edwardes College Peshawar and the University of Peshawar in 1954. He obtained his Bachelor of Laws from Khyber Law College, University of Peshawar in 1956.

Khan started his legal practice in 1957 and was subsequently selected as advocate of the West Pakistan High Court on 24 June 1959 and advocate of the Supreme Court of Pakistan on 28 April 1976. He was later appointed as additional judge of the Peshawar High Court on 8 April 1982 and permanent Judge of the same Court on 8 April 1984. He also served as acting governor of governor of the North-West Frontier Province from 10 March to 16 March 1993. He was elevated as a judge of the Supreme Court of Pakistan on 3 April 1993.

After serving as a Supreme Court judge, he became a member of the Federal Public Service Commission from May 1998 to January 2000. Before his retirement on 11 January 2003, he served as chief justice of the Federal Shariat Court on 12 January 2000.

Khan died on 12 December 2023, at the age of 90.
