= Maula Bakhsh Chandio =

Pakistani politician

Senator
- In office March 2018 – March 2024

Federal Minister for Law
- In office 14 April 2011 – 10 April 2012
- Prime Minister: Yusuf Raza Gillani
- Preceded by: Babar Awan
- Succeeded by: Farooq H. Naek

Minister of Parliamentary Affairs of Pakistan
- In office April 2012 – 27 July 2012
- Prime Minister: Raja Pervaiz Ashraf

Personal details
- Born: 16 April 1944 (age 82) Hyderabad, Sindh, Pakistan
- Citizenship: Pakistani
- Party: PPP (2008-present)
- Spouse: Nasreen moula baksh
- Children: Umair Moula Baksh; Mehran Moula Baksh hira kashif Rabab Moula Baksh

Maula Bakhsh Chandio (Urdu: مولا بخش چانڈیو, Sindhi: مولا بخش چانڊيو) is a Pakistani politician who served as the Federal Minister for Law. He is also a member of the Senate of Pakistan.

== Early life ==
He was born on 16 April 1944 in Hyderabad and belongs to Chandio Sindhi-Baloch family. Recently he wrote his biography Galiyaan Yad Nagar ki launched by Sindh Governor Dr. Ishratul Ibad Khan at Karachi Press Club.

== Career ==
He was selected as information adviser to CM Sindh.

He was elected as Senator in 2009 by PPP-P. In April 2011 he became Federal Minister for Law, Justice, and Parliamentary Affairs, where he contributed 18th Amendment in the Constitution of Pakistan. In April 2012 his portfolio was changed to Federal Minister of Parliamentary and Political Affairs. On 27 July 2012 he became Senior Vice President of PPP-P Sindh. He is considered the ideological intellect of the party and holds a soft image among both the coalition partners and opposition.
