= NAB amendments case =

2024 Pakistani Legal Case

NAB Amendments Case
- Court: Supreme Court of Pakistan
- Decided: Decided on September 6, 2024

Case opinions
- Dissent: Justice Athar Minallah

Laws applied
- National Accountability Ordinance (NAO) 2002

Keywords
- NAB, Imran Khan, Supreme Court, Pakistan, amendments

The NAB Amendments Case refers to a legal case in Pakistan involving amendments to the National Accountability Bureau (NAB) laws. The case has been heard by the Supreme Court of Pakistan and has involved several key figures, including former Prime Minister Imran Khan. The Supreme Court finally ruled that the NAB amendments were constitutional.

== Background ==
The case revolves around the amendments made to the National Accountability Ordinance (NAO) 2002. These amendments were challenged by Imran Khan, resulting in the Supreme Court ruling in September 2023 by a majority of 2-1 declaring the amendments unconstitutional. The court ordered the reopening of all corruption cases worth less than Rs 500 million which were earlier closed against political leaders and public officials of various parties.

== Court proceedings ==
As of 6 June 2024, the Supreme Court has reserved its judgment on the federal government's petition seeking a review of the judgment against the amendments to the NAB rules. The Supreme Court heard the Federal Government's Intra Court Appeal (ICA) against the majority verdict. The proceedings were conducted through video link, Imran Khan appeared from Adiala Jail. The court reserved its decision on the government's appeals against the annulment of the amendments in the NAB rules.

=== Imran Khan's arguments ===
Imran Khan, who challenged the amendments, attended the hearing through video link from Rawalpindi's Adiala Jail. Khan argued that the amendments would according to Samaa TV 'make things easier for him', but cited the country's "bankruptcy."

However, most of these changes were originally done by Imran Khan Government, especially the Rs 500 million corruption limits. These changes were implemented by Khan through the presidential order signed by President Arif Alvi. Later on Khan blamed the opposition for this change. Khan also later took advantage of the Rs 500 million cap by requesting to close the NAB case against him.

=== Final Ruling ===
On 6 September 2024, the Supreme Court in a unanimous verdict overturned the previous ruling and re-instated the amendments to the NAB laws.

Justice Athar Minallah issued a dissenting note on the decision not to telecast the NAB amendment case live. In his 13-page dissenting note, he wrote that live broadcasting of the case is necessary to protect fundamental rights.
