= M. D. Tahir =

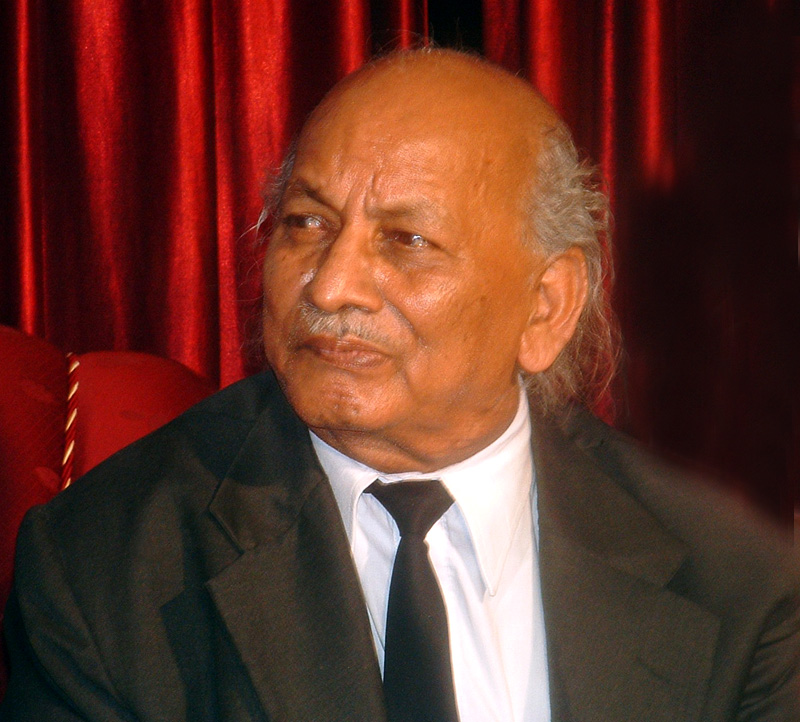
M. D. Tahir

Muhammad Din Tahir (1942 – 20 April 2008), known as M. D. Tahir, was a prominent Pakistani lawyer. He came from a Gujjar family and was born in the small village Takoli, in the district of Ambala.

== Early life ==
Tahir's mother died a few months after his family's migration to Sargodha in Pakistan in 1947. His father died when he was seven years old, leaving Tahir and his sister Hashmat as orphans. After the death of their parents, neither orphan had any means of earning money. He started studying under the streetlights and sold milk and ice to earn a little money. Under these circumstances, Tahir continued his study and graduated from Zamindara College in Gujrat, Punjab, and thereafter became a lawyer, earning an LLB from Punjab University.

== Law practice ==
Tahir started his practice as a lawyer in 1972. He was appointed special commissioner to record the statement of the Chief Martial Law Administrator of Pakistan, Yahya Khan, after the end of his regime. Mr. Tahir was the first Pakistani lawyer to move writ petitions in the Lahore High Court as well as in the Supreme Court of Pakistan for sake of poor people's rights. He also moved submissions to the International Court of Justice against cruelties of the war in Iraq, Palestine, Kashmir, and around the world.

== Death ==
He died on Sunday night, 20 April 2008 of cardiac arrest at the age of 65 in Lahore. Tahir is buried in the side area of a mosque in which he trusted his land and funded the mosque to be built.
