= Azam Nazeer Tarar =

Pakistani politician

Federal Minister for Law and Justice
- Incumbent
- Assumed office 11 March 2024
- President: Asif Ali Zardari
- Prime Minister: Shehbaz Sharif
- Preceded by: Ahmad Irfan Aslam
- In office 30 November 2022 – 9 August 2023
- President: Arif Alvi
- Prime Minister: Shehbaz Sharif
- Preceded by: Ayaz Sadiq
- Succeeded by: Ahmad Irfan Aslam
- In office 19 April 2022 – 31 October 2022
- President: Arif Alvi
- Prime Minister: Shehbaz Sharif
- Preceded by: Fawad Chaudhry
- Succeeded by: Ayaz Sadiq

Federal Minister of Parliamentary Affairs
- In office 4 April 2024 – 27 February 2025
- President: Asif Ali Zardari
- Prime Minister: Shehbaz Sharif
- Succeeded by: Tariq Fazal Chaudhry

Senate of Pakistan
- Incumbent
- Assumed office March 2021
- Constituency: Punjab Province, Pakistan

Pakistan Bar Council
- In office 2014–2015

Secretary of Lahore High Court Bar Association
- In office 2004–2005

Personal details
- Party: PMLN (2021-present)

Azam Nazeer Tarar (Urdu, Punjabi: اعظم نذیر تارڑ) is a Pakistani politician who is serving as the Federal Minister of Law and Justice from 11 March 2024. He is a member of the Senate of Pakistan elected from Punjab in March 2021.

As a lawyer and legal advisor he has been considered close to the Sharif family since the 2017 Panama Papers case.

== Early life and education ==
He belongs to Tarar and his family roots are in the Hafizabad District of Punjab, Tarar received his early education in Hafizabad and later attended Government College, Lahore, where he was active in student politics and a successful bilingual debater. He earned his LLB from Punjab University Law College in 1992 and completed his LLM from the University of Edinburgh in 1994.

== Legal career ==
Tarar was enrolled as an Advocate of the High Courts in 1995 and of the Supreme Court of Pakistan in 2006. He gained prominence as a leading criminal and constitutional lawyer, with numerous reported judgments and contributions as amicus curiae. Active in bar politics, he served as Secretary of the Lahore High Court Bar Association (2004) and has been a Member of the Pakistan Bar Council since 2010, including terms as Vice Chairman (2015) and Chairman Executive Committee. As Chairman of the Legal Education Committee, he led major reforms in legal education, including the introduction of a five-year LLB program. He has also represented Pakistan at various international legal forums.

== Political career ==
He served as Leader of the House in the Senate from 20 April to 30 September 2022. He also served as Vice Chairman of the Pakistan Bar Council.

Tarar resigned from the post of Federal Minister of Law and Justice on 24 October 2022. He confirmed his resignation from the post to different news agencies. Azam claimed his resignation was due to some personal activities but rumors say Tarar was not comfortable with the government's decision, but prime minister rejected his resignation on November 29.

In 2023, Tarar moved the Supreme Court (Practice and Procedure) Bill 2023, which was passed by the Joint Sitting of the Parliament on 10 April 2023.
