= Wasi Zafar =

Pakistani politician (1949–2021)

Muhammad Wasi Zafar (12 January 1949 – 7 August 2021) was a Pakistani politician. He was a former law minister of Pakistan. He was born in the city of Multan in Punjab, Pakistan. He was a lawyer and became a member of the National Assembly on a PML(Q) ticket. Zafar was unable to run in the February 2008 parliamentary election as a PML(Q) candidate and instead ran unsuccessfully as an independent.

Zafar received media attention during the election campaign for verbally threatening a television journalist during a live telecast. In 2005, his son beat up a fellow passenger at Jinnah International Airport in his presence.
