= Babar Awan =

Pakistani politician, lawyer, author, analyst, columnist and leftist writer

- ظہیر الدین بابر اعوان

Advisor to Prime Minister for Parliamentary Affairs (Federal Minister)
- In office 6 April 2020 – 10 April 2022
- President: Arif Alvi
- Prime Minister: Imran Khan
- Preceded by: Azam Swati
- In office 20 August 2018 – 4 September 2018
- President: Arif Alvi
- Prime Minister: Imran Khan
- Succeeded by: Ijaz Ahmed Shah

Member of the Senate of Pakistan (Senator)
- In office 12 March 2012 – 17 July 2017
- Constituency: Punjab, Pakistan
- In office 22 February 2006 – 28 February 2012
- Constituency: Punjab, Pakistan

Vice President of Pakistan People’s Party
- In office 29 December 2011 – 2 May 2012
- Chairman: Bilawal Bhutto Zardari
- Co-Chairman: Asif Ali Zardari
- Preceded by: Shah Mahmood Qureshi
- Succeeded by: Manzoor Wattoo

Federal Minister for Law and Justice
- In office 3 November 2008 – 12 April 2011
- President: Asif Ali Zardari
- Prime Minister: Yusuf Raza Gillani
- Preceded by: Farooq H. Naek
- Succeeded by: Moula Bakhsh Chandio

Personal details
- Born: Zaheer-ud-din Babar Awan Islamabad, Pakistan
- Citizenship: Pakistan
- Party: PTI (2017–present)
- Other political affiliations: PPP (1997–2017)
- Relations: Ghulam Farooq Awan (brother) Malik Shakeel Awan (nephew)
- Education: University of Punjab; Karachi University; Monticello University
- Occupation: Lawyer, Politician
- Awards: Sitara-e-Imtiaz (2012)

Zaheer-ud-din Babar Awan (Urdu: ظہیر الدین بابر اعوان; SI), is a Pakistani politician, senior lawyer, author, analyst, columnist, and leftist writer who served as Adviser to Prime Minister for Parliamentary Affairs from April 2020 to 10 April 2022, and before that as the Federal Law Minister in the cabinet of former Prime Minister Yousaf Raza Gillani. He also served as a junior Pakistani Senator of Punjab Province from 2012 to 2017. Later he joined PTI to serve as Member Executive Council of PTI.

He regularly writes and publishes on left-wing philosophy. He extensively writes political columns in a leading Urdu newspaper, the Daily Jang, in support of social democracy and social justice.

== Early life and education ==
Babar Awan studied at the Asghar Mall College in Rawalpindi and matriculated in 1971, later attending the Punjab University to study humanities. In 1975, Awan graduated with a B.A. in Humanities, and later obtained Master of Science in Economics from the Punjab University in 1978.

In 1980, Awan moved to Karachi and attended the Karachi University to study law where he obtained LLB in civil law in 1986. He began practicing law at the Sindh High Court, initially taking criminal cases.

Awan now lives in Islamabad. His brother Ghulam Farooq Awan served as the advisor to Prime Minister of Pakistan Yousaf Raza Gillani for Law, Justice and Parliamentary Affairs. He also served as the additional Attorney General of Pakistan.

== Political career ==
=== Early activism and PPP ===
His interest in politics grew in the 1980s while studying law at the Karachi University, and was an activist of the Peoples Students Federation— a youth wing of the Pakistan Peoples Party (PPP). In 1996, he became member of the PPP.

Although being a member of the PPP, he unsuccessfully contested the 1997 Pakistani general election from NA-36 Rawalpindi-I as a candidate of the Pakistan Muslim League (J). He received 21,768 votes and was defeated by Shahid Khaqan Abbasi, a candidate of the Pakistan Muslim League (N) (PML(N)).

In 2002, Awan unsuccessfully contested the Islamabad constituency in the general elections, but conceded his defeat. In 2004, Benazir Bhutto appointed Awan as the finance secretary of the Pakistan People's Party.

In 2006, Awan successfully contested the indirect elections for Senate, and was elected unopposed. Awan was present alongside prominent party leaders such as Ameen Faheem when the announcement of Benazir Bhutto's return to Pakistan was made. Awan was present during the 19 October attack on Benazir Bhutto in Karachi, and then when Benazir Bhutto was killed in Rawalpindi. Awan was the first one to announce Bhutto's death to the Pakistani public, outside Rawalpindi General Hospital which is now known as Benazir Bhutto Hospital. Awan told the party workers outside the hospital, "I have just talked to Dr. Mussadiq, he has confirmed to me that Mohtarma (Benazir Bhutto) has been martyred."

=== Law and Justice Ministry (2008–2011) ===
After successfully contesting general elections held in 2008, Awan was appointed the Minister for Parliamentary Affairs as well as the Law Minister in November 2008.

Over many legal issues, Awan resigned from the Justice Ministry in 2011, but was brought back less than 48 hours later. During this time, Awan was considered the right-hand man of then-President Zardari. He was also given the Ministry of Information Technology. In 2011, he resigned as minister to plead in the Zulfiqar Ali Bhutto murder case. On 2 May 2012, Awan was stripped of all his party posts by the Central Executive Committee of the PPP.

=== Links with other political parties ===
The PPP has used Awan for dialogue with other political parties. Awan is highly supported in his Awan tribe. His political base lies in his hometown. Awan's elder brother was also a worker of the Pakistan People's Party. Another one of his brothers works for the Muttahida Qaumi Movement in Punjab. In 2011, Awan held negotiations on behalf of the Pakistan Peoples Party with the Pakistan Muslim League. This led to an alliance between the PPP and the PML, which further strengthened the PPP government and gave them a majority in Parliament. Awan often used to negotiate on the behalf of the PPP with Chaudhry Pervaiz Elahi, who is the Punjab President of PML-Q. Awan was also used for dialogue with PPP's coalition partner, MQM. Ishrat-ul-Ibad Khan, the 30th governor of Sindh visited Awan at his residence and agreed that a working relationship should be established between the PPP and MQM. His nephew, Shakeel Awan is a member of the PML-N and is also a former member of the Pakistan National Assembly. He had defeated Shaikh Rasheed Ahmad in his constituency.

=== 2013 elections campaign and PTI ===
On 28 May 2013, Awan issued a statement saying that it was the right of the new government to complete its stipulated term; however, the opposition should not be of the government's choice. He added that, "the role of the opposition would now be determined in accordance with the Constitution and the rules of business as opposed to via any reconciliatory formula." In July 2013, Awan criticized the Pakistan Election Commission for organizing Presidential Elections in a manner that dissatisfied the opposition political parties.

He went on to say that, "holding presidential election with the shortage of a large number of 46 law makers would result into constitutional chaos and will be a stigma on the election for the extremely distinguished constitutional office." On 5 July 2012, Awan said, "there is serious power crisis and the newly elected government has to take prompt measures including construction of Kalabagh Dam." He further said before restoration of bilateral ties with India, Islamabad had to raise outstanding Kashmir and water issue.

After Awan's sacking, it was expected that he would join another party although he remained a member of the PPP for another five years. In early 2013, Awan met Chairman Pakistan Tehreek-e-Insaf Imran Khan. Rumours spread that Awan would soon join the PTI.

On 21 June 2017 Awan announced that he will join PTI and with immediate effect step down from his seat in Senate.

== Other work ==
=== Writings and columns ===
In June 2012, Awan claimed that he was receiving life threats and that his family was also being threatened. He asked the concerned authorities to provide him with security. In early 2013, Awan began tweeting regularly. He uses his Twitter account to make political statements and to maintain contact with his supporters. By July 2013, Awan had 34,000 followers on Twitter.

In 2011, Awan published his first book called the Wakalat Nama [Urdu: وکالت نامۂ; Lawyers' diary], which was a collection of his columns and articles published in the newspapers of Pakistan from 1997 to 2009. In November 2011, Awan published another book based on the arguments he made in court during the Karachi Conspiracy case. The judges' bench of that case was led by Chief Justice of Pakistan Iftikhar Muhammad Chaudhry.

=== Television anchor and analyst ===
He is doing television programs from last many years, early he was doing an Islamic show on ATV and later he did Ikhtilafi Note on Neo TV. The show was hosted by Farwat Malik and Babar Awan participated as an analyst.

== Controversies ==
=== Haris Steel case (2009) ===
In November 2009, National Accountability Bureau of Pakistan summoned Awan after he was accused of getting bribes worth 30 million Pakistani rupees from the owners of the Haris Steel Mill in order to get a favourable verdict from the court. Awan was reported to have said that he had certainly not taken 30 million rupees and that the money he had taken was his professional fee. He further said that anyone was welcome to pursue any complaint in any professional body. In 2011, Sheikh Afzal, the owner of Haris Steel Mill, stated that he has been pressured by the Punjab Government to issue a statement against Awan. The charges were later dropped against Awan, due to Sheikh Afzal's statement.

=== Contempt of court (2011) ===
On 1 December 2011, Awan held a press conference in which he criticized a Supreme Court judge. The Supreme Court issued a notice of contempt of court to Awan in late December. On 5 January 2012, Awan was issued a second contempt of court notice by Supreme Court of Pakistan, due to a comment he made while talking to the media on 4 January. His license to practice law was subsequently suspended on 17 January for an indefinite period. The Supreme Court further asked the Federal Government to appoint someone else as their lawyer in the Zulfiqar Ali Bhutto case. Ali Ahmad Kurd disagreed with the Supreme Court's decision to suspend Awan's license. Awan was indicted by the Supreme Court in March 2012. Awan's counsel, Ali Zafar, maintained during the hearing that the court cannot indict Awan without having made a decision on the unconditional apology he offered twice to the court. He said that the purpose of contempt of court proceedings is to maintain the respect of the judiciary not to "demean someone."

=== PhD claim (2012) ===
According to the media sources and investigative journalists accounts, Awan is said to have been awarded a PhD in criminal law from the diploma mill Monticello University based in Hawaii, United States, in 1998. Controversy surrounded his law PhD also noted that the Monticello University misspelled his PhD nomination papers as "Monty Cello" from where he affirmed to have done his doctorate degree.

=== Witness in contempt case (2012) ===
The President of Pakistan, Asif Ali Zardari in a briefing to his close confidants disclosed that he had given a personal guarantee that Babar Awan will appear before the court as a witness in Prime Minister's contempt case. This was later confirmed by Prime Ministers council Aitezaz Ahsan in an interview given to Arshad Sharif for his program KYUN. Aitezaz said Babar's name was given to him by both the President and PM but Babar Awan refused to show up which irked the President.

== Books ==
- وکالت‌نامه / Vakālat Nāmah [Power of Attorney], Lahore: Jumhūrī Publications, 2010, 486 p. Collected articles on Pakistan politics and government; published in newspapers.
- کراچى قتل عام: از خود نوٹس سپريم کورٹ آف پاکستان / Karācī qatl-i ʻām: az k̲h̲vud noṭis Suprīm Korṭ āf Pākistān [Karachi Massacre: Suo Moto Notice by the Supreme Court of Pakistan], Lahore: Jumhūrī Publications, 2011, 112 p. On his arguments as advocate of the state representing PPP against the suo moto action taken by the Supreme Court on the civilian killings in Karachi.
- رجیم چینج اور توہینِ ریاست ضیا، مشرف اور قمر باجوہ کے تنازعے / Regime Change aur Tauheen e Riasat: Zia, Musharraf aur Qamar Bajwa ke Tanazay [Regime Change and Insult to the State: The Controversies of Zia, Musharraf, and Qamar Bajwa], Lahore: Jumhūrī Publications, 2023, 224 p.

== See also ==
- Supreme Court Bar Association of Pakistan
- Lahore High Court Bar Association
