= Najam ul Hasan =

Najam ul Hasan His Lordship

16th Chief Justice of the Federal Shariat Court
- In office 15 May 2017 – 10 May 2019
- Nominated by: Nawaz Sharif
- Appointed by: Mamnoon Hussain
- Preceded by: Riaz Ahmad Khan

Personal details
- Born: Sheikh Najam ul Hasan; March 15, 1952 (age 74) Lahore, Punjab, Pakistan
- Education: Forman Christian College graduation from Government Islamia College, Civil Lines, Lahore Punjab University
- Occupation: Chief Justice
- Profession: Advocate

Najam ul Hasan (Urdu: نجم الحسن, born 15 March 1952), is a Pakistani jurist who served as the 16th Chief Justice of the Federal Shariat Court, in office from 15 May 2017 till 10 May 2019.

== Early life and education ==
Najam ul Hasan's father was a prominent lawyer but unfortunately he died young when Hasan was only 16 years old. He passed his matriculation from Govt. Pilot High School, Lahore, and Intermediate Examinations from Forman Christian College, Lahore. He completed his L.L.B from University of Punjab.
