= Law and Justice Commission of Pakistan =

Statutory authority in Pakistan

Agency overview
- Formed: 1979; 47 years ago
- Type: Statutory authority
- Jurisdiction: Pakistan
- Status: active
- Headquarters: Pakistan Secretariat
- Agency executives: Chief Justice of Pakistan, Chairperson; Chief Justice of the Federal Shariat Court, Member; Attorney-General for Pakistan, Member; National Commission on the Status of Women, Member; Chairperson of Human Rights Commission of Pakistan, Member
- Website: ljcp.gov.pk

The Law and Justice Commission of Pakistan (LJCP) is a statutory authority of the government of Pakistan established under the Law and Justice Commission Ordinance, 1979. It is responsible for the development and improvement of the legal system in the country and designed for recommending reforms in laws and statutes. The agency also suggests modernization, unification and codification in laws, if needed. It also recommend removal of inconsistencies. Advocating for speedy justice is also one of its duties.

The LJCP is headed by Chief Justice of Pakistan as its chairperson, while members are selected or otherwise elected from various courts such as Chief Justice of the Federal Shariat Court and chief justices of High Courts. The attorney general, law secretary, chairperson of Human Rights Commission, and National Commission on the Status of Women are appointed as its members. The federal government also appoints four members from each province.

== Functions ==
The LJCP is predominantly focused on reviewing laws and suggesting changes to the proposed or existing laws in Pakistan. It also recommend for the codification and implementation of Islamic canonical law, in addition to serving as a statutory institution for the development of modern and Islamic law as well as laws concerning social reforms. It plays a central role in policymaking and legal reforms.

== Appointments and resignation ==
Governed by the Law and Justice Commission of Pakistan Ordinance, 1979, the members of the commission are appointed by the federal government of Pakistan for the term of three years. Members usually submit their written resignation to the president of Pakistan.

== Criticism ==
The LJCP has arguably failed to perform its duty due to lack of interest towards the commission by the government. The commission is also accused of preparing poor and slow reports.
