= Ahmer Bilal Soofi =

Pakistani politician

Minister of Law, Justice, Parliamentary Affairs and Human Rights
- In office 2 April 2013 – 7 June 2013
- President: Asif Ali Zardari
- Prime Minister: Mir Hazar Khan Khoso (caretaker)

Personal details
- Born: 25 November 1962 (age 63)

Ahmer Bilal Soofi is a Pakistani lawyer and a former Minister of Law, Justice, Parliamentary Affairs and Human Rights in the 2013 Khoso caretaker ministry. Soofi is a member of the Board of Governors of the Islamabad Policy and Research institute, a think tank based in Islamabad.

Soofi regularly contributes articles to Pakistani newspapers, offering commentary and analysis on legal, social, and political issues.

== Early life and education ==
Ahmer Bilal Soofi was born to M. A. Soofi, a periodontist, and Iqbal Soofi, a medical doctor. His father, M. A. Soofi, was a dentist who had worked for the Muslim League and Muslim National Guard.

He has a Master of Laws degree from the University of Cambridge.

== Legal career ==
In 2013, the Pakistani government engaged Soofi's firm for Rs 90M (approx US$838,000) to act in a dispute before the International Centre for Settlement of Investment Disputes.

== Views ==
Soofi has condemned Israel's actions in its war against Gaza, arguing that Israel had committed genocide, that its occupation of Palestinian territory was illegal, and that Palestinians had a right to armed resistance under international law. He has argued that the Quran is a legally binding contract between Allah and all of humanity, including non-believers of Islam.

Amidst the ongoing 2025 India–Pakistan crisis, Soofi has argued in favour of the Pakistani government's view that any abeyance of the Indus Waters Treaty by India would constitute an act of war against Pakistan, which would justify a nuclear attack upon India. Soofi interprets the Advisory Opinion on the Legality of the Threat or Use of Nuclear Weapons as implicitly legitimising Pakistan's possession of nuclear weapons and the proposition that in extreme circumstances, nations may justifiably use nuclear weapons as a form of self defence.

== Personal life ==
He is married with three sons. His son Bakhtawar Bilal Soofi is an Advocate of the Punjab bar and a partner at the elder Soofi's law firm. Bakhtawar's younger brother, Sadiq Karim Soofi, is a graduate of Harvard University.

He was formerly the president of WWF Pakistan.
