= Federal Shariat Court =

Pakistani constitutional Islamic religious court

- Flag of the Federal Shariat Court
- Established: 1980; 46 years ago
- Jurisdiction: Pakistan
- Location: Constitution Avenue, Islamabad
- Authorised by: Constitution of Pakistan
- Appeals to: Supreme Court of Pakistan
- Judge term length: 3 years
- Number of positions: 8
- Website: www.federalshariatcourt.gov.pk

Chief Justice of the Federal Shariat Court
- Currently: Justice Dr. Syed Muhammad Anwer
- Since: 2 June 2026

The Federal Shariat Court (FSC) is a constitutional Islamic religious court of the Islamic Republic of Pakistan, which has the power to examine and determine whether the laws of the country comply with Sharia law. The court was established in 1980 during the government of the President General Muhammad Zia-ul-Haq. It is located in the federal capital, Islamabad. It hears appeals under the Hudood Ordinances, a religious legislation in the country introduced in 1979.

The Federal Shariat Court is the only authority which holds the constitutional power to prohibit and prevent the enactment of laws which are deemed to be un-Islamic by the parliament of Pakistan. It is predominantly focused on examining new or existing law of Pakistan. If a law violates the Quran, sunnah or hadith, the Shariat Court will prohibit its enactment.

The current chief justice of Federal Shariat Court of Pakistan is Dr. Syed Muhammad Anwer

== Court structure and mandate ==
It consists of eight Muslim judges appointed by the President of Pakistan on the advice of the Chief Justice of the Court, from amongst the serving or retired judges of the Supreme Court or a High Court or from amongst persons possessing the qualifications of High Court judges. Of the 8 judges, 3 are required to be Ulema who are well versed in Islamic law. The judges hold office for a period of 3 years, which may eventually be extended by the President.

Appeal against its decisions lies to the Shariat Appellate Bench of the Supreme Court, consisting of 3 Muslim judges of the Supreme Court and 2 Ulema, appointed by the President. If any part of the law is declared to be against Islamic law, the government must take necessary steps to amend such law appropriately.

The court also exercises revisional jurisdiction over the criminal courts, deciding Hudood cases. The decisions of the court are binding on the High Courts as well as subordinate judiciary. The court appoints its own staff and frames its own rules of procedure.

== Court's history of cases ==
In March 1981, the court ruled in an adultery appeal that stoning people to death was "repugnant to the injunctions of Islam," a decision that upset the ruling General Zia ul-Haq and Islamic revivalists. Zia ul-Haq then replaced several members of the court, and the above-mentioned decision was reversed.

In 1982, the Federal Shariat Court ruled that there is no prohibition in the Qur'an or Hadith about the judgeship of a woman nor any restriction limiting the function of deciding disputes to men only. In 2013 Ashraf Jehan became the first female justice of the Federal Shariat Court.

In 2016, Provincial Assembly of the Punjab passed a legislature, the Punjab Protection of Women against Violence Act 2016. Soon after its passing, it was challenged in Federal Shariat Court.

In February 2017, the court issued its ruling on test-tube babies and validated its use conditionally. The Nation reported, "The Federal Shariat Court yesterday declared the option of using 'test tube baby' method for conceiving babies for the married couples having some medical complications as lawful."

The fact that lawyers make up a permanent majority of judges of the court, outnumbering Islamic ulama, has been credited with the court finding "technical flaws in every stoning and amputation appeal that it has ever heard", preventing the carrying out of sentences decreeing amputation of limbs and killing by stoning.

== Chief Justice and judges ==
Sr. No	Name	Designation	Date of appointment
1	Syed Muhammad Anwer	Chief Justice	02 June 2026
2	Justice Ameer Muhammad Khan	Judge	26 March 2024
3	Vacant		
4	Vacant		
5	Vacant		
6	Vacant		
7	Vacant		
8	Vacant		

== See also ==
- List of chief justices of the Federal Shariat Court
