= List of senators in the 14th Parliament of Pakistan =

Party	Seats	Party	Seats
PPP	26	JI	1
PML (N)	27	NP	3
MQM	8	PkMAP	3
PTI	7	BNP-A	2
ANP	6	PML (F)	1
JUI (F)	5	BNP	1
PML (Q)	4	Independents	10

Senators in the 14th Parliament of Pakistan refers to the members of the Senate of Pakistan in the 14th Parliament of Pakistan. The Senate is the upper legislative chamber of the bicameral legislature of Pakistan, and together with the National Assembly makes up the Parliament of Pakistan.

The Senate of Pakistan consist of total 104 members. 23 elect by the members of each of the total four Provincial Assemblies of whom 14 elect on general seats, four on women seats, four on technocrats/ulema seats, while one elect on non-Muslim seat. From the FATA, eight senators elect by direct and free vote, while Islamabad sends 4 members to the Senate of whom two elect on general seats, while one each on women and technocrat.

The tenure of a Senator lasts for six years but elections are held within the duration of three years – when one half of the members of the senate retire after completion of their tenure.

The Senate election in Pakistan occurred on 5 March 2015 to elect one-half of the Senate. The senators elected in 2015, together with those elected on 2012, will comprise the Senate's delegation in the 14th Parliament of Pakistan.

Raja Zafar ul Haq of PML-N elected as Leader of the House while Aitzaz Ahsan of PPP succeed Ishaq Dar as Leader of the Opposition. Raza Rabbani of PPP and Abdul Ghafoor Haideri of JUI-F elected as the legislature's speaker and deputy speaker, respectively.

== Members ==
Region	Member	Political party	Term		Seat	Electoral history	Ref
Balochistan	Muhammad Daud Khan Achakzai	Awami National Party	2012	2018	General	Elected for the first time in 2012.	
Balochistan	Nawabzada Saifullah Magsi	Pakistan Peoples Party	2012	2018	General	Elected for the first time in 2012.	
Balochistan	Sardar Fateh Muhammad Muhammad Hassani	Pakistan Peoples Party	2012	2018	General	Elected for the first time in 2012.	
Punjab	Saud Majeed	Pakistan Muslim League (N)	2012	2018	General	Elected for the first time in 2012.	
Sindh	Sehar Kamran	Pakistan Peoples Party	2012	2018	Women	Elected for the first time in 2012.	
Khyber Pakhtunkhwa	Shahi Sayed	Awami National Party	2012	2018	General	Elected for the first time in 2012.	
Sindh	Muzaffar Hussain Shah	Pakistan Muslim League (F)	2012	2018	General	Elected for the first time in 2012.	
Punjab	Zulfiqar Ali Khosa	Pakistan Muslim League (N)	2012	2018	General	Elected for the first time in 2012.	
Balochistan	Naseema Ehsan	Balochistan National Party Awami	2012	2018	Women	Elected for the first time in 2012.	
Sindh	Nasreen Jalil	Muttahida Qaumi Movement	2012	2018	Women	Elected for the first time in 1994. Re-elected in 1997 and again in 2012.	
Khyber Pakhtunkhwa	Ahmed Hassan	Pakistan Peoples Party	2012	2018	General	Elected for the first time in 2012.	
Punjab	Aitzaz Ahsan	Pakistan Peoples Party	2012	2018	Technocrats/Ulema	Elected for the first time in 1994. Re-elected in 1997 and again in 2012.	
Balochistan	Muhammad Yousaf	Pakistan Peoples Party	2012	2018	General	Elected for the first time in 2012.	
Punjab	Muhammad Zafar Ullah Khan Dhandla	Pakistan Muslim League (N)	2012	2018	General	Elected for the first time in 2012.	
Sindh	Mukhtiar Ahmed Dhamrah - Aajiz	Pakistan Peoples Party	2012	2018	General	Elected for the first time in 2012.	
Islamabad	Mushahid Hussain Syed	Pakistan Muslim League (Q)	2012	2018	Technocrats/Ulema	Elected for the first time in 2003. Re-elected in 2012.	
Khyber Pakhtunkhwa	Baz Muhammad Khan	Awami National Party	2012	2018	General	Elected for the first time in 2012.	
Sindh	Taj Haider	Pakistan Peoples Party	2012	2018	Technocrats/Ulema	Elected for the first time in 1994. Re-elected in 1997 and again in 2012.	
Sindh	Tahir Hussain Mashhadi	Muttahida Qaumi Movement	2012	2018	General	Elected for the first time in 2006. Re-elected in 2012.	
Sindh	Farogh Naseem	Muttahida Qaumi Movement	2012	2018	Technocrats/Ulema	Elected for the first time in 2012.	
Khyber Pakhtunkhwa	Farhatullah Babar	Pakistan Peoples Party	2012	2018	Technocrats/Ulema	Elected for the first time in 2012.	
Balochistan	Israr Ullah Zehri	Balochistan National Party Awami	2012	2018	General	Elected for the first time in 2006. Re-elected in 2012.	
Khyber Pakhtunkhwa	Zahida Khan	Awami National Party	2012	2018	Women	Elected for the first time in 2012.	
Balochistan	Hafiz Hamdullah	Jamiat Ulema-e-Islam (F)	2012	2018	General	Elected for the first time in 2012.	
Punjab	M Hamza	Pakistan Muslim League (N)	2012	2018	General	Elected for the first time in 2012.	
Sindh	Hari Ram	Pakistan Peoples Party	2012	2018	Non-Muslim	Elected for the first time in 2012.	
FATA	Hidayat Ullah	Independent	2012	2018	General	Elected for the first time in 2012.	
FATA	Hilal-ur-Rehman	Independent	2012	2018	General	Elected for the first time in 2012.	
Khyber Pakhtunkhwa	Ilyas Ahmed Bilour	Awami National Party	2012	2018	Technocrats/Ulema	Elected for the first time in 1994. Re-elected in 1997, in 2003, in 2006 and again in 2012.	
Punjab	Kamil Ali Agha	Pakistan Muslim League (Q)	2012	2018	General	Elected for the first time in 2003. Re-elected in 2012.	
Balochistan	Rozi Khan Kakar	Pakistan Peoples Party	2012	2018	Technocrats/Ulema	Elected for the first time in 2012.	
Balochistan	Rubina Irfan	Pakistan Muslim League (Q)	2012	2018	Women	Elected for the first time in 2012.	
Khyber Pakhtunkhwa	Rubina Khalid	Pakistan Peoples Party	2012	2018	Women	Elected for the first time in 2012.	
Sindh	Saeed Ghani	Pakistan Peoples Party	2012	2018	General	Elected for the first time in 2012.	
Balochistan	Saeed Ul Hassan Mandokhail	Pakistan Muslim League (Q)	2012	2018	General	Elected for the first time in 2012.	
Punjab	Kamran Michael	Pakistan Muslim League (N)	2012	2018	Non-Muslim	Elected for the first time in 2012.	
Sindh	Karim Ahmed Khawaja	Pakistan Peoples Party	2012	2018	General	Elected for the first time in 2012.	
Punjab	Khalida Parveen	Pakistan Peoples Party	2012	2018	Women	Elected for the first time in 2012.	
FATA	Malik Najmul Hassan	Independent	2012	2018	General	Elected for the first time in 2012.	
Khyber Pakhtunkhwa	Nisar Muhammad	Pakistan Muslim League (N)	2012	2018	General	Elected for the first time in 2012.	
Punjab	Nuzhat Sadiq	Pakistan Muslim League (N)	2012	2018	Women	Elected for the first time in 2012.	
Islamabad	Osman Saifullah Khan	Pakistan Peoples Party	2012	2018	General	Elected for the first time in 2012.	
Sindh	Maulana Tanveer-ul-Haq Thanvi	Muttahida Qaumi Movement	2012	2018	General	Elected for the first time in 2012.	
Sindh	Raza Rabbani	Pakistan Peoples Party	2012	2018	General	Elected for the first time in 1994. Re-elected in 1997, in 2003, in 2006 and again in 2012.	
Khyber Pakhtunkhwa	Azam Khan Swati	Pakistan Tehreek-e-Insaf	2012	2018	General	Elected for the first time in 2003. Re-elected in 2012.	
Punjab	Ishaq Dar	Pakistan Muslim League (N)	2012	2018	Technocrats/Ulema	Elected for the first time in 2003. Re-elected in 2006 and again in 2012.	
Balochistan	Mufti Abdul Sattar	Jamiat Ulema-e-Islam (F)	2012	2018	Technocrats/Ulema	Elected for the first time in 2012.	
Punjab	Muhammad Mohsin Khan Leghari	Independent	2012	2018	General	Elected for the first time in 2012.	
FATA	Muhammad Saleh Shah	Independent	2012	2018	General	Elected for the first time in 2012.	
Khyber Pakhtunkhwa	Muhammad Talha Mahmood Aryan	Jamiat Ulema-e-Islam (F)	2012	2018	General	Elected for the first time in 2006. Re-elected in 2012.	
Sindh	Rehman Malik	Pakistan Peoples Party	2015	2021	General	Elected for the first time in 2009. Re-elected in 2015.	
Khyber Pakhtunkhwa	Maulana Atta Ur Rehman	Jamiat Ulema-e-Islam (F)	2015	2021	General	Elected for the first time in 2015.	
FATA	Aurangzeb Khan	Independent	2015	2021	General	Elected for the first time in 2015.	
Punjab	Ayesha Raza Farooq	Pakistan Muslim League (N)	2015	2021	Women	Elected for the first time in 2015.	
Khyber Pakhtunkhwa	John Kenneth Williams	Pakistan Tehreek-e-Insaf	2015	2021	Non-Muslim	Elected for the first time in 2015.	
Punjab	Chaudhary Tanvir Khan	Pakistan Muslim League (N)	2015	2021	General	Elected for the first time in 2015.	
Balochistan	Ashok Kumar	National Party (Pakistan)	2015	2021	Non-Muslim	Elected for the first time in 2015.	
Balochistan	Jehanzeb Jamaldini	Balochistan National Party	2015	2021	General	Elected for the first time in 2015.	
Sindh	Farooq Naek	Pakistan Peoples Party	2015	2021	Technocrats/Ulema	Elected for the first time in 2003. Re-elected in 2009 and again in 2015.	
Punjab	Ghous Muhammad Khan Niazi	Pakistan Muslim League (N)	2015	2021	General	Elected for the first time in 2015.	
Sindh	Gianchand	Pakistan Peoples Party	2015	2021	General	Elected for the first time in 2015.	
Balochistan	Gul Bashra	Pakhtunkhwa Milli Awami Party	2015	2021	Women	Elected for the first time in 2015.	
FATA	Haji Momin Khan Afridi	Independent	2015	2021	General	Elected for the first time in 2015.	
Islamabad	Sardar Yaqoob Khan Nasar	Pakistan Muslim League (N)	2015	2021	General	Elected for the first time in 1994. Re-elected in 2009 and again in 2015.	
Sindh	Islamuddin Shaikh	Pakistan Peoples Party	2015	2021	General	Elected for the first time in 1988. Re-elected in 1997, in 2009 and again in 2015.	
Balochistan	Kalsoom Perveen	Pakistan Muslim League (N)	2015	2021	Women	Elected for the first time in 2003. Re-elected in 2015.	
Khyber Pakhtunkhwa	Khanzada Khan	Pakistan Peoples Party	2015	2021	General	Elected for the first time in 2015.	
Sindh	Khushbakht Shujaat	Muttahida Qaumi Movement	2015	2021	General	Elected for the first time in 2015.	
Khyber Pakhtunkhwa	Liaqat Khan Tarakai	Pakistan Tehreek-e-Insaf	2015	2021	General	Elected for the first time in 2015.	
Punjab	Abdul Qayyum	Pakistan Muslim League (N)	2015	2021	General	Elected for the first time in 2015.	
Khyber Pakhtunkhwa	Salahuddin Tirmizi	Pakistan Muslim League (N)	2015	2021	General	Elected for the first time in 2015.	
Sindh	Muhammad Ateeq Shaikh	Muttahida Qaumi Movement	2015	2021	General	Elected for the first time in 2015.	
Balochistan	Hasil Bizenjo	National Party (Pakistan)	2015	2021	General	Elected for the first time in 2009. Re-elected in 2015.	
Balochistan	Mir Kabeer Ahmed Muhammad Shahi	National Party (Pakistan)	2015	2021	Technocrats/Ulema	Elected for the first time in 2015.	
Balochistan	Mir Muhammad Yousaf Badini	Independent	2015	2021	General	Elected for the first time in 2009. Re-elected in 2015.	
Balochistan	Mir Naimatullah Zehri	Pakistan Muslim League (N)	2015	2021	General	Elected for the first time in 2015.	
Khyber Pakhtunkhwa	Mohsin Aziz	Pakistan Tehreek-e-Insaf	2015	2021	General	Elected for the first time in 2015.	
Balochistan	Abdul Ghafoor Haideri	Jamiat Ulema-e-Islam (F)	2015	2021	General	Elected for the first time in 2009. Re-elected in 2015.	
Sindh	Muhammad Ali Khan Saif	Muttahida Qaumi Movement	2015	2021	Technocrats/Ulema	Elected for the first time in 2015.	
Khyber Pakhtunkhwa	Muhammad Javed Abbasi	Pakistan Muslim League (N)	2015	2021	Technocrats/Ulema	Elected for the first time in 2015.	
Balochistan	Muhammad Usman Khan Kakar	Pakhtunkhwa Milli Awami Party	2015	2021	General	Elected for the first time in 2015.	
Punjab	Mushahid Ullah Khan	Pakistan Muslim League (N)	2015	2021	General	Elected for the first time in 2009. Re-elected in 2015.	
Punjab	Najma Hameed	Pakistan Muslim League (N)	2015	2021	Women	Elected for the first time in 2009. Re-elected in 2015.	
Khyber Pakhtunkhwa	Nauman Wazir Khattak	Pakistan Tehreek-e-Insaf	2015	2021	Technocrats/Ulema	Elected for the first time in 2015.	
Sindh	Nighat Mirza	Muttahida Qaumi Movement	2015	2021	Women	Elected for the first time in 2003. Re-elected in 2015.	
Punjab	Pervaiz Rasheed	Pakistan Muslim League (N)	2015	2021	General	Elected for the first time in 2009. Re-elected in 2015.	
Punjab	Sajid Mir	Pakistan Muslim League (N)	2015	2021	Technocrats/Ulema	Elected for the first time in 1994. Re-elected in 1997, in 2003, in 2006, in 2009 and again in 2015.	
Islamabad	Rahila Magsi	Pakistan Muslim League (N)	2015	2021	Women	Elected for the first time in 2015.	
Punjab	Raja Zafar ul Haq	Pakistan Muslim League (N)	2015	2021	Technocrats/Ulema	Elected for the first time in 1991. Re-elected in 1994, in 1997, in 2009 and again in 2015.	
FATA	Sajjad Hussain Turi	Independent	2015	2021	General	Elected for the first time in 2015.	
Sindh	Saleem Mandviwalla	Pakistan Peoples Party	2015	2021	General	Elected for the first time in 2009. Re-elected in 2015.	
Punjab	Saleem Zia	Pakistan Muslim League (N)	2015	2021	General	Elected for the first time in 2015.	
Khyber Pakhtunkhwa	Samina Abid	Pakistan Tehreek-e-Insaf	2015	2021	Women	Elected for the first time in 2015.	
Balochistan	Sardar Muhammad Azam Khan Musakhel	Pakhtunkhwa Milli Awami Party	2015	2021	General	Elected for the first time in 2015.	
Sindh	Sassui Palijo	Pakistan Peoples Party	2015	2021	Women	Elected for the first time in 2015.	
Sindh	Sherry Rehman	Pakistan Peoples Party	2015	2021	General	Elected for the first time in 2015.	
Khyber Pakhtunkhwa	Siraj-ul-Haq	Jamaat-e-Islami Pakistan	2015	2021	General	Elected for the first time in 2015.	
Khyber Pakhtunkhwa	Sitara Ayaz	Awami National Party	2015	2021	Women	Elected for the first time in 2015.	
Khyber Pakhtunkhwa	Shibli Faraz	Pakistan Tehreek-e-Insaf	2015	2021	General	Elected for the first time in 2015.	
FATA	Taj Muhammad Afridi	Independent	2015	2021	General	Elected for the first time in 2015.	
Balochistan	Agha Shahzaib Durrani	Pakistan Muslim League (N)	2017	2021	General	Elected for the first time in 2017.	
Punjab	Syed Asif Saeed Kirmani	Pakistan Muslim League (N)	2017	2015	General	Elected for the first time in 2017.	
Punjab	Asad Ashraf	Independent	2018	2021	General	Elected for the first time in 2018.	

== Membership changes ==
Region	Member	Political party	Reason	Electoral history	Ref
Khyber Pakhtunkhwa	Muhammad Azam Khan Hoti	Awami National Party	Died in April 2015 while in office of Senate.	Elected for the first time in 1994. Re-elected in 2012.	
Sindh	Abdul Hafeez Shaikh	Pakistan Peoples Party	Resigned from senatorship in March 2013 citing personal issues as a reason of his resignation.	Elected for the first time in 2003. Re-elected in 2006 and again in 2012.	
Sindh	Abdul Latif Ansari	Pakistan Peoples Party	Resigned in May 2015 to make the way for Sherry Rehman to become member of the Senate.	Elected for the first time in 2003. Re-elected in 2015.	
Punjab	Malik Muhammad Rafique Rajwana	Pakistan Muslim League (N)	Resigned in May 2015 from the office of Senate to assume the office of the governor of Punjab.	Elected for the first time in 1997. Re-elected in 2012.	
Sindh	Syed Mustafa Kamal	Muttahida Qaumi Movement	Resigned in December 2013 from the office of Senate after leaving Muttahida Qaumi Movement.	Elected for the first time in 2012.	
Islamabad	Iqbal Zafar Jhagra	Pakistan Muslim League (N)	Resigned in February 2016 from the office of Senate to assume the office of the governor of Khyber Pakhtunkhwa.	Elected for the first time in 1997. Re-elected in 2015.	
Balochistan	Agha Shahbaz Khan Durrani	Pakistan Muslim League (N)	Died while in office in 2017.	Elected for the first time in 2015.	
Punjab	Babar Awan	Pakistan Peoples Party	Resigned from PPP and the Senate in June 2017 to join PTI	Elected for the first time in 2006. Re-elected in 2012.	
Khyber Pakhtunkhwa	Haji Saifullah Khan Bangash	Pakistan Peoples Party	Died in February 2018.	Elected for the first time in 2012.	
Punjab	Nehal Hashmi	Pakistan Muslim League (N)	Disqualified by the Supreme Court of Pakistan in February 2018.	Elected for the first time in 2015.	

== See also ==
- List of members of the 14th National Assembly of Pakistan
