= 2009 Pakistani Senate election =

- 3 March 2009

50 of the 100 seats in the Senate 51 seats needed for a majority
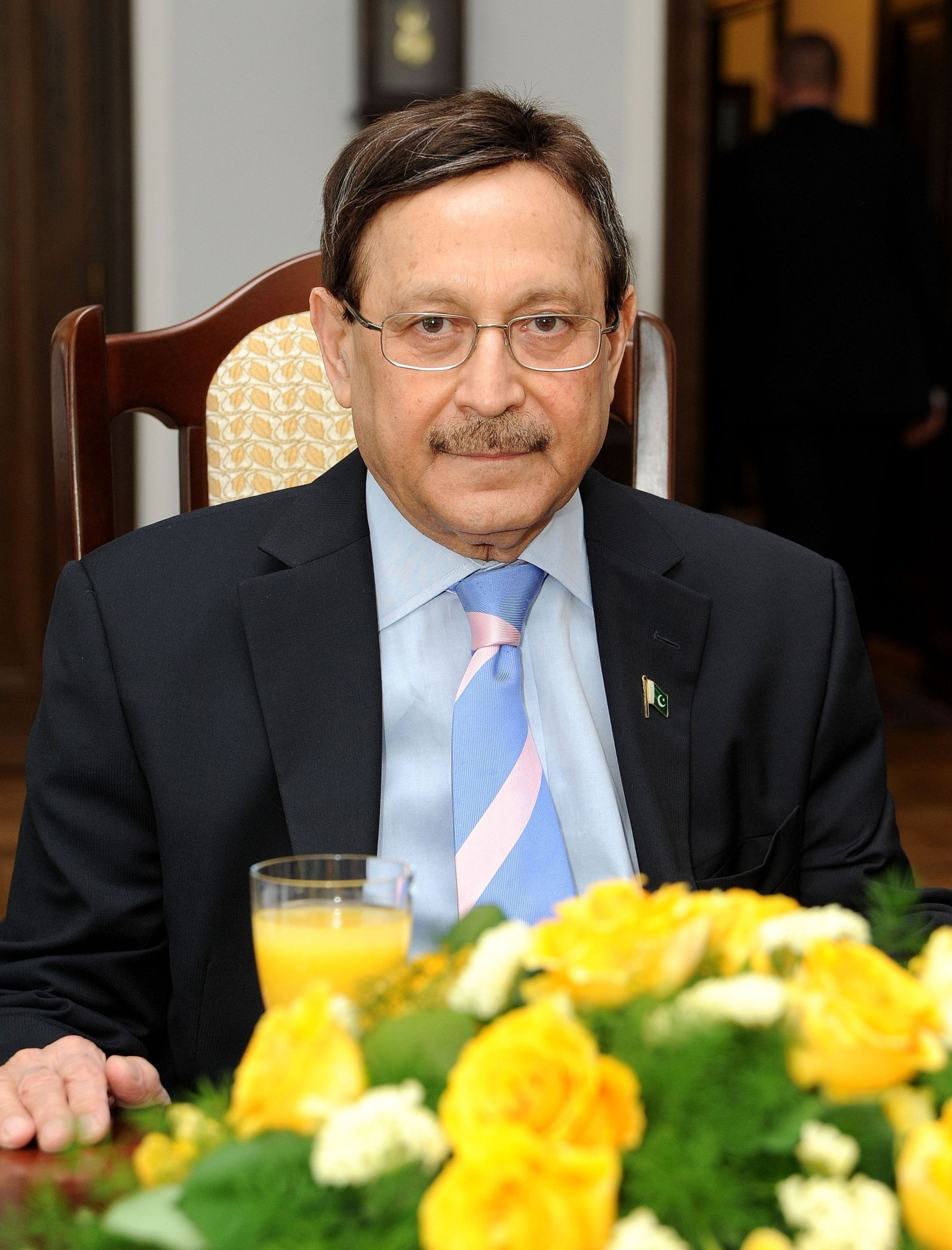

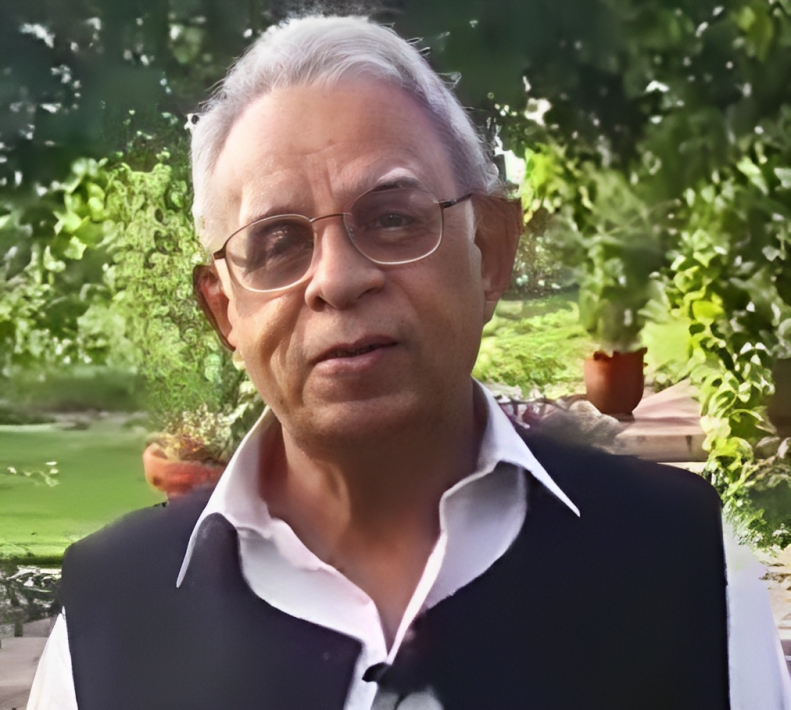
	Majority party	Minority party
Leader	Farooq Naek	Wasim Sajjad
Party	PPP	PML(Q)
Last election	9	39
Seats won	27	21
Seat change	▲18	▼18
Chairman before election
Muhammad Mian Soomro
PML(Q)
Elected Chairman
Farooq Naek
PPP

Senate elections were held in Pakistan on 3 March 2009. 50 of the 100 seats in the Senate were up for election with the winning candidates serving six-year terms.

== Results ==
Party	Seats		
Party	Won	Not up	Total
Pakistan Peoples Party Parliamentarians	22	5	27
Pakistan Muslim League (Q)	1	20	21
Muttahida Majlis-e-Amal	0	9	9
Pakistan Muslim League (N)	6	1	7
Awami National Party	5	1	6
Mutahidda Qaumi Movement	3	3	6
Jamiat Ulema-e-Islam (F)	3	1	4
Balochistan National Party (Awami)	1	1	2
Jamhoori Wattan Party	0	1	1
National Party	1	0	1
Pashtunkhwa Milli Awami Party	0	1	1
Pakistan Muslim League (F)	0	1	1
Pakistan People's Party	0	1	1
Independents	8	5	13
Total	50	50	100
Source: IPU

=== Results by administrative division ===
The following are the results of the elections, by administrative division.

Punjab
Seat Type	Winners						
General	Pervaiz Rashid (PML-N)	Raja Zafar-ul-Haq (PML-N)	Syed Zafar Ali Shah (PML-N)	Mushahid Ullah Khan (PML-N)	Jehangir Bader (PPP)	Malik Salah-ud-Din Dogar (PPP)	Shujaat Hussain (PML-Q)
Technocrat	Sajid Mir (PML-N)			Muhammad Kazim Khan (PPP)			
Women	Najma Hameed (PML-N)				Sughra Imam (PPP)		

Sindh
Seat Type	Winners						
General	Maula Bakhsh Chandio (PPP)	Islamuddin Shaikh (PPP)	Gul Muhammad Lot (PPP)	Faisal Raza Abidi (PPP)	Asim Hussain (PPP)	Babar Khan Ghauri (MQM)	Abdul Haseeb Khan (MQM)
Technocrat	Farooq Naek (PPP)			Rehman Malik (PPP)			
Women	Almas Parveen (PPP)				Shirala Mallick (MQM)		

Khyber Pakhtunkhwa
Seat Type	Winners						
General	Zahid Khan (ANP)	Abdul Nabi Bangash (ANP)	Haji Muhammad Adeel (ANP)	Gulzar Ahmed Khan (PPP)	Waqar Ahmed Khan (PPP)	Sardar Ali Khan (PPP)	Haji Ghulam Ali (JUI-F)
Technocrat	Afrasiab Khattak (ANP)			Adnan Khan (PPP)			
Women	Farah Aqil (ANP)				Farhat Abbas (PPP)		

Balochistan
Seat Type	Winners						
General	Nawabzada Muhammad Akbar Magsi (IND)	Mir Wali Muhammad Badini (IND)	Sabir Ali Baloch (PPP)	Lashkari Raisani (PPP)	Muhammad Khan Sherani (JUI-F)	Mir Muhammad Ali Rind (BNP-A)	Hasil Bizenjo (NP)
Technocrat	Humayun Khan Mandokhel (IND)			Abdul Ghafoor Haideri (JUI-F)			
Women	Kalsoom Perveen (IND)				Suriya Amiruddin (PPP)		

FATA
Seat Type	Winners			
General	Abbas Khan Afridi (Independent)	Haji Khan Afridi (Independent)	Muhammad Idrees Khan Safi (Independent)	Malik Rashid Ahmed Khan (Independent)

ICT
Seat Type	Winners
General	Nayyar Hussain Bukhari (PPP)
Women	Saeeda Iqbal (PPP)

== Aftermath ==
After the election, on 13 March 2006, Farooq Naek of the ruling Pakistan People's Party (PPP) was elected to the position of Chairman unopposed. He replaced Muhammad Mian Soomro of the Pakistan Muslim League (Q) (PML(Q)). On the same day, Jan Mohammad Jamali of the PML(Q) was re-elected to the position of Deputy Chairman unopposed.

On 9 March 2006, Raza Rabbani of the PPP, the incumbent Leader of the House, resigned from his position in protest of Naek's nomination to the chairmanship by the PPP. On 17 April 2006, he was replaced by Nayyar Hussain Bukhari, also of the PPP. On the same day, Wasim Sajjad of the PML-Q was appointed as the Leader of the Opposition.
