= 2012 Pakistani Senate election =

- 2 March 2012

54 of the 104 seats in the Senate 53 seats needed for a majority
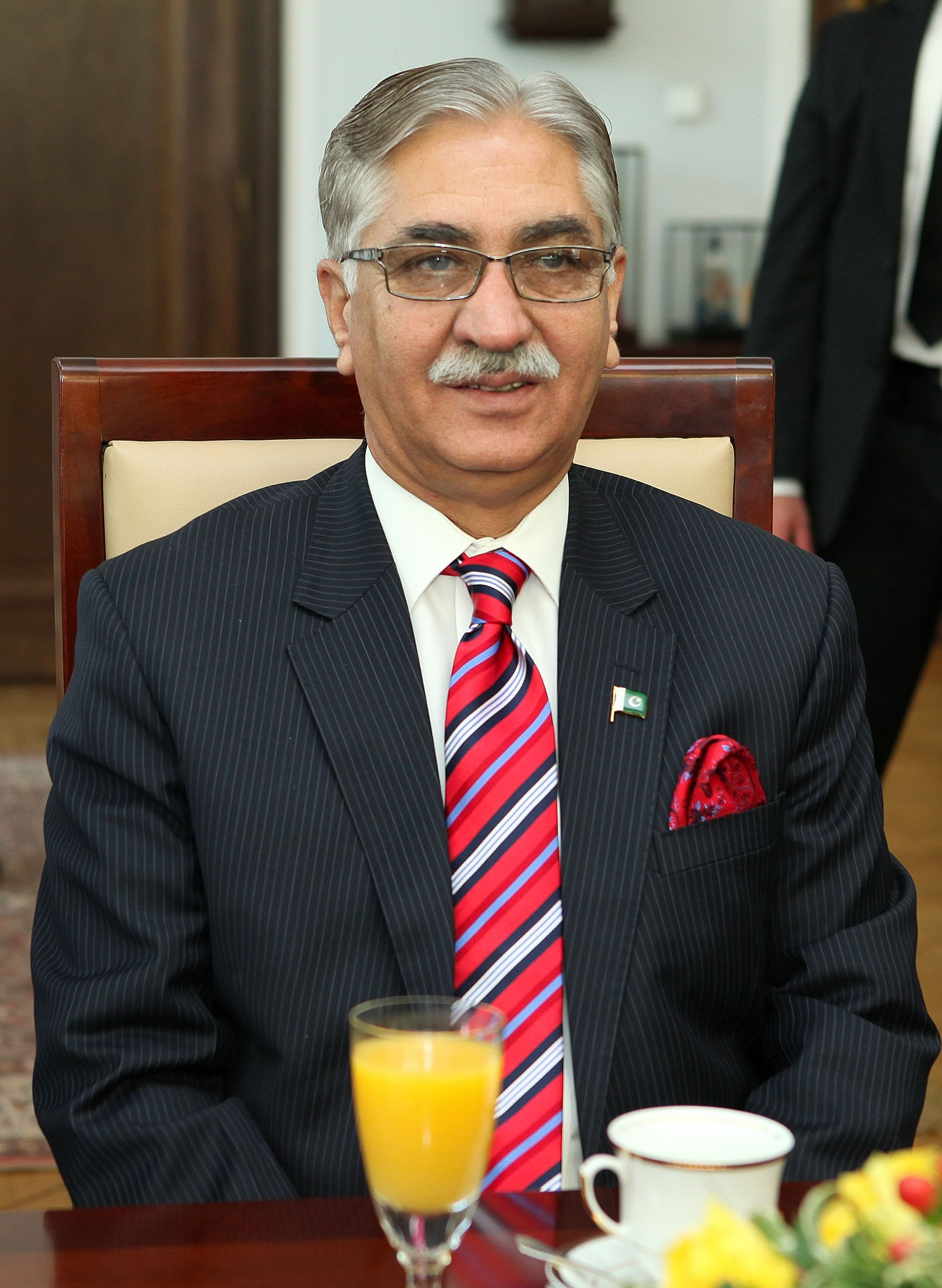

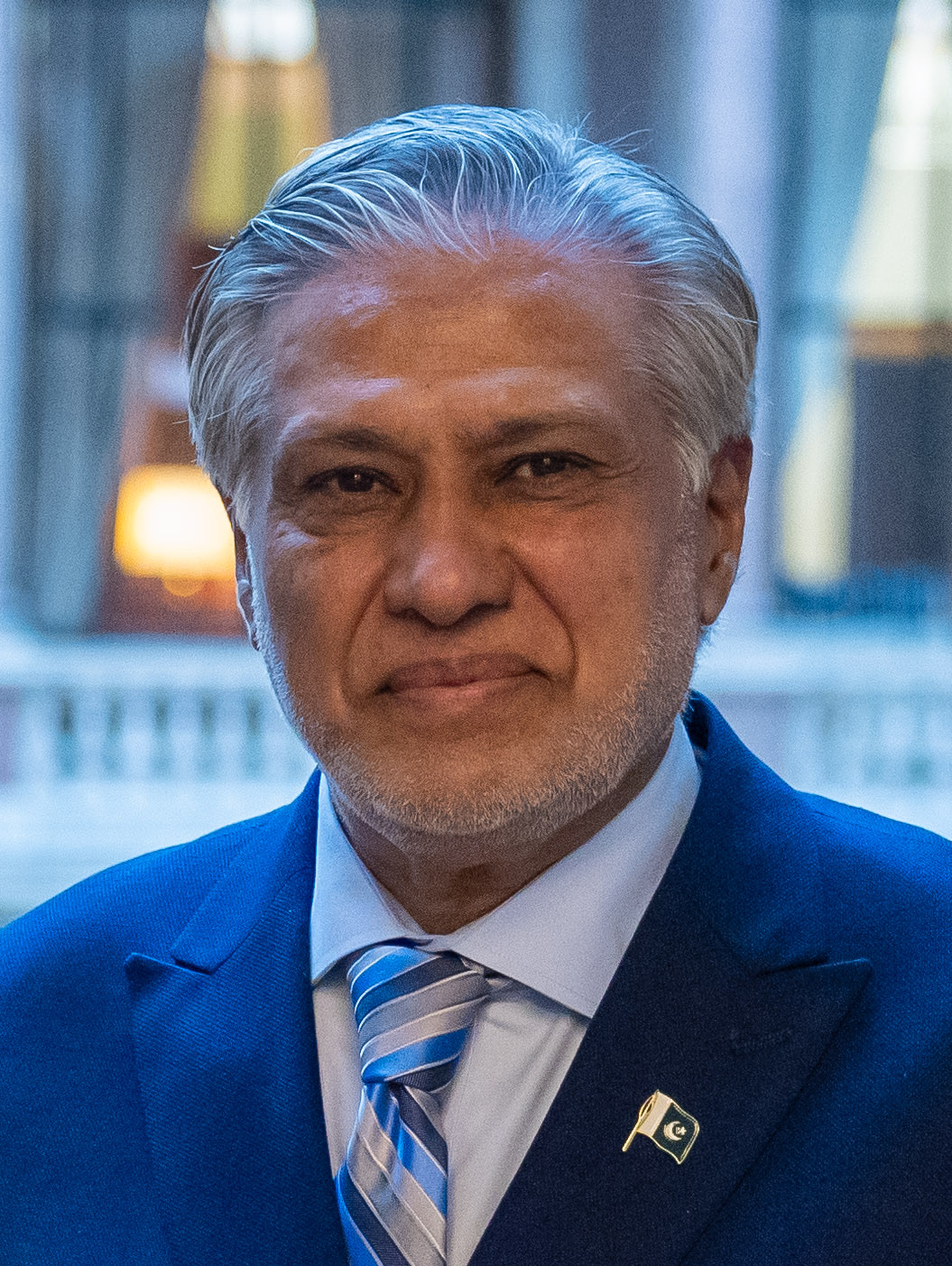
	Majority party	Minority party
Leader	Nayyar Hussain Bukhari	Ishaq Dar
Party	PPP	PML(N)
Last election	27	7
Seats won	41	14
Seat change	▲14	▲7
- Results by province
Chairman before election
Farooq Naek
PPP
Elected Chairman
Nayyar Hussain Bukhari
PPP

Senate elections were held in Pakistan on 2 March 2012. Fifty-four of the 100 seats in the Senate were up for election with the winning candidates serving six-year terms.

== Results ==
Party	Seats		
Party	Won	Not up	Total
Pakistan Peoples Party	19	22	41
Pakistan Muslim League (N)	8	6	14
Awami National Party	7	5	12
Jamiat Ulema-e-Islam (F)	4	3	7
Muttahida Qaumi Movement – London	4	3	7
Balochistan National Party (Awami)	2	2	4
Pakistan Muslim League (Q)	4	0	4
Pakistan Muslim League	0	1	1
National Party	0	1	1
Pakistan Muslim League (F)	1	0	1
Independents	5	7	12
Total	54	50	104
Source: IPU

=== By administrative division ===
Parties	FATA	Balochistan	Federal Capital	Khyber Pakhtunkhwa	Punjab	Sindh	Total
Pakistan Peoples Party	0	4	1	4	3	7	19
Pakistan Muslim League (N)	0	0	0	1	7	0	8
Awami National Party	0	1	0	6	0	0	7
Pakistan Muslim League (Q)	0	2	1	0	1	0	4
Mutahidda Qaumi Movement	0	0	0	0	0	4	4
Jamiat Ulema-e-Islam	0	3	0	1	0	0	3
Balochistan National Party (Awami)	0	2	0	0	0	0	2
Pakistan Muslim League (F)	0	0	0	0	0	1	1
Independents	4	0	0	0	1	0	5
Total	4	12	2	12	12	12	54

The following is the results of the election by administrative division.

Punjab
Seat Type	Winners						
General	Zulfiqar Ali Khosa (PML-N)	Muhammad Hamza (PML-N)	Muhammad Zafar Ullah Khan Dhandla (PML-N)	Rafique Rajwana (PML-N)	Babar Awan (PPP)	Kamil Ali Agha (PML-Q)	Muhammad Mohsin Khan Leghari (IND)
Technocrat	Ishaq Dar (PML-N)			Aitzaz Ahsan (PPP)			
Women	Nuzhat Sadiq (PML-N)				Khalida Parveen (PPP)		
Minority	Kamran Michael (PML-N)						

Sindh
Seat Type	Winners						
General	Raza Rabbani (PPP)	Saeed Ghani (PPP)	Mukhtiar Ahmed Dhamrah (PPP)	Karim Ahmed Khawaja (PPP)	Syed Mustafa Kamal (MQM)	Tahir Hussain Mashhadi (MQM)	Muzaffar Hussain Shah (PML-F)
Technocrat	Abdul Hafeez Shaikh (PPP)			Farogh Naseem (MQM)			
Women	Sehar Kamran (PPP)				Nasreen Jalil (MQM)		
Minority	Hari Ram (PPP)						

Khyber Pakhtunkhwa
Seat Type	Winners						
General	Baz Muhammad Khan (ANP)	Shahi Sayed (ANP)	Azam Khan Hoti (ANP)	Haji Saifullah Khan Bangash (PPP)	Ahmed Hassan (PPP)	Muhammad Talha Mahmood (JUI-F)	Nisar Muhammad (PML-N)
Technocrat	Ilyas Ahmed Bilour (ANP)			Farhatullah Babar (PPP)			
Women	Zahida Khan (ANP)				Rubina Khalid (PPP)		
Minority	Amar Jeet (ANP)						

Balochistan
Seat Type	Winners						
General	Nawabzada Saifullah Magsi (PPP)	Sardar Fateh Muhammad Muhammad Hassani (PPP)	Mohammad Yousaf (PPP)	Hafiz Hamdullah (JUI-F)	Israr Ullah Zehri (BNP-A)	Saeed Ul Hassan Mandokhail (PML-Q)	Daud Khan Achakzai (ANP)
Technocrat	Abdul Sattar (JUI-F)			Rozi Khan Kakar (PPP)			
Women	Naseema Ehsan (BNP-A)				Rubina Irfan (PML-Q)		
Minority	Heman Dass (JUI-F)						

FATA
Seat Type	Winners			
General	Muhammad Saleh Shah (Independent)	Malik Najmul Hassan (Independent)	Hidayat Ullah (Independent)	Hilal-ur-Rehman (Independent)

ICT
Seat Type	Winners
General	Osman Saifullah (PPP)
Technocrat	Mushahid Hussain (PML-Q)

== Aftermath ==
After the election, on 12 March 2012, Nayyar Hussain Bukhari of the ruling Pakistan People's Party (PPP) was elected Chairman unopposed. On the same day, Sabir Ali Baloch, also of the PPP, was elected to the position of Deputy Chairman unopposed. They replaced Farooq Naek of the PPP and Jan Mohammad Jamali of the Pakistan Muslim League (Q) (PML(Q)), respectively. Moreover, on 27 April 2012, Jehangir Bader of the PPP succeeded Bukhari as the Leader of the House, and on 15 March 2012, Ishaq Dar of the Pakistan Muslim League (N) (PML-N) became the Leader of the Opposition, succeeding Abdul Ghafoor Haideri of the Jamiat Ulema-e-Islam (F) (JUI-F).
