= List of committees of the Senate of Pakistan =

The Senate of Pakistan has a number of committees each of which handles a specific legislative area. The committee members usually have specialized knowledge or interest in the matters under their jurisdiction. The committees monitor government activities, identify issues suitable for legislative review, gather and evaluate information, and recommend courses of action to the Senate. The number of committees has gradually increased from six during Zulfikar Ali Bhutto's government (1973–77) to fifty-two, as of 2017. There are several types of committee, with the majority (thirty-four) called the "standing committees" and others called "functional committee".

Standing committees
Committee name		Chairperson	Secretary Committee
1	Aviation	Hidayat Ullah Khan (AWP)	Syed Khurram Hussain Naqvi
2	Cabinet Secretariat	Muhammad Talha Mahmood (JUI-F)	Hyder Ali Sundrani
3	Commerce & Textiles	Mirza Muhammad Afridi (Independent)	Iffat Mustafa
4	Communications	Prince Ahmed Umer Ahmedzai (BAP)	Hassan Farooq Dar
5	Climate Change	Sitara Ayaz (ANP)	Khalid Kamal Veryamani
6	Defence	Waleed Iqbal (PTI)	Dr. Syed Pervaiz Abbas
7	Defence Production	Lt. General (R) Abdul Qayyum (PML-N)	Arshad Jan Pathan
8	Federal Education and Professional Training	Rahila Magsi (PML-N)	Faiqa Abdul Hayee
9	Finance, Revenue, Economic Affairs, Statistics and Privatization	Farooq Naek (PPP)	Muhammad Tahir Khan
10	Foreign Affairs	Mushahid Hussain (PML-N)	Dr. Syed Pervaiz Abbas
11	Housing and Works	Mir Kabeer Ahmed Muhammad Shahi (NP)	Mughees Ahmad Shaikh
12	Inter-Provincial Coordination	Sardar Muhammad Yaqoob Khan Nasar (PML-N)	Asim Khan Goraya
13	Interior		Javed Iqbal
14	Information, Broadcasting and National Heritage	Faisal Javed Khan (PTI)	Qurat ul Ain
15	Industries and Production	Hidayat Ullah (Independent)	Farzana Khan
16	Information Technology and Telecommunications	Rubina Khalid (PPP)	Asim Khan Goraya
17	Kashmir Affairs & Gilgit Baltistan	Sajid Mir (PML-N)	Faiqa Abdul Hayee
18	Law and Justice	Muhammad Javed Abbasi (PML-N)	Rabeea Anwar
19	Maritime Affairs	Rubina Khalid (PPP)	Amjad Ali
20	Narcotics Control	Sardar Muhammad Shafiq Tareen (Independent)	Zarghoona Shabbir
21	National Food Security and Research	Syed Muzafar Hussain Shah (PML-F)	Hafeezullah Sheikh
22	National Health Services Regulations and Coordination	Sajjad Hussain Turi (Independent)	Malik Arshad Iqbal
23	Overseas Pakistanis and Human Resource Development	Baz Muhammad Khan (ANP)	Shaukat Javaid
24	Parliamentary Affairs	Saeed Ghani (PPPP)	Rafiullah
25	Planning Development and Reform	Atta-ur-rehman (JUI-F)	Hammad Khan Marri
26	Postal Services	Khushbakht Shujaat (MQM)	Fahmeed Ahmed
27	Power	Fida Mohammad Khan (PTI)	Tayyib Bin Tahir Khan
28	Privatization	Mir Muhammad Yousaf Badini (Independent)	Ch. Salamat Ali
29	Religious Affairs and Inter-Faith Harmony	Maulana Hafiz Hamdullah (JUI-F)	Hammad Khan Marri
30	Planning Development and Reforms	Col (R) Syed Tahir Hussain Mashhadi (MQM)	Farzana Khan
31	Railway	Muhammad Asad Ali Khan Junejo (Independent)	Jamil Ahmed Khoso
32	States and Frontier Regions	Hilal-ur-Rehman (Independent)	Shaukat Javaid
33	Science and Technology	Mushtaq Ahmad Khan (JI)	Haris Rehman
34	Water Resources	Shahadat Awan (Independent)	Wajeeha Riaz

Functional Committees
Committee name	Chairperson	Secretary Committee
Government Assurances	Muhammad Tahir Bizenjo	Muhammad Tahir Khan
Human Rights	Walid Iqbal (PTI)	Rabeea Anwar
Problems of Less Developed Areas	Muhammad Usman Khan Kakar (PMAP)	Masror Hausen
Devolution	Mir Kabeer Ahmed Muhammad Shahi (NP)	Rabeea Anwar

Other Committees
Committee name	Chairperson	Secretary Committee
Rules of Procedure and Privileges	Dr. Jehanzeb Jamaldini (BNP-M)	Muhammad Anwar
Delegated Legislation	Taj Haider (PPPP)	Masror Hausen

Special Committees
Committee name	Chairperson	Secretary Committee
China-Pak Economic Corridor (CPEC)	Sherry Rehman (PPPP)	Masror Hausen
Issue of Lapse of Various Foreign Scholarships	Syed Muzafar Hussain Shah (PML-F)	
Ethics	Mian Raza Rabbani (PPPP)	Rabeea Anwar
The Performance of PIA	Mushahid Ullah Khan (PML-N)	Hafeezullah Sheikh
The Twenty Four Demands made by Government of Khyber Pakhtunkhwa	Syed Muzafar Hussain Shah (PML-F)	Zarghona Shabbir
Bipartisan Special Oversight Committee		Rabeea Anwar
Oversight Committee	Muhammad Javed Abbasi (PML-N)	Rabeea Anwar
Gas Infra Structure Development Cess Bill, 2015	Ilyas Ahmad Bilour (ANP)	Iffat Mustafa
Marginalized Segments of Society	Nisar Muhammad (PML-N)	Mughees Ahmad Shaikh
The Drafting Committee of the Committee of the Whole		

Select Committees
Committee Name	Chairperson	Secretary Committee
The Right to Information Bill, 2016	Farhatullah Babar	

Domestic Committees
Committee name	Chairperson	Secretary Committee
Senate House Committee	Molana Abdul Ghafoor Haideri (JUI-F)	Hafeezullah Sheikh
Senate Finance Committee	Mian Raza Rabbani (PPPP)	Amjed Pervez Malik
Business Advisory Committee	Mian Raza Rabbani (PPPP)	Amjed Pervez Malik
Senate Library Committee	Nuzhat Sadiq (PML-N)	Shagufta Shaukat
