= Ghaus =

Arabic name

Ghaus, Ghous, Ghos or Gawth is a masculine given name and surname of Arabic origin. Notable people with this name include:

== Given name ==
=== Ghaus ===
- Ghaus Bakhsh Bizenjo (1917–1989), Pakistani politician
- Ghaus Mohammad (1915–1982), Indian tennis player
- Ghaus Pak, a title of Abdul Qadir Gilani (1078–1166), Sufi preacher and theologian
- Ghaus Bakhsh Sabir (1938–2015), Pakistani scholar, author, playwright, and poet

=== Ghous ===
- Ghous Bux Brohi, Pakistani musician
- Ghos Bakhsh Khan Mahar (born 1945), Pakistani politician
- Ghous Muhammad Khan Niazi, Pakistani politician
- Ghous Bakhsh Raisani (1924–1987), Pakistani politician
- Ghous Ali Shah (born 1934), Pakistani politician and jurist

== Surname ==
- Adnan Ghaus (born 1990), Pakistani cricket player
- Aisha Ghaus Pasha (born 1962), Pakistani politician
- Gholam Ghaus Z., Afghan-German citizen
- Ghulam Ghaus (Afghan politician), Afghan politician
- Ghulam Ghaus (Indian politician), Indian politician from Bihar
- Ghulam Ghaus Hazarvi (1896–1981), Pakistani politician
- Ghulam Ghaus Khan (died 2005), Indian freedom fighter from Rawalpindi
- Jarnail Ghaus Khan (died 1814), Indian general in the Sikh Empire
- Muhammad Ghawth (1500–1562), Indian Sufi saint from Gwalior
