= Muhammad Idrees Khan Safi =

Pakistani politician

Senator Muhammad Idrees Khan Safi محمد ادریس خان صافی

Chairperson- Senate Committee on Federal Education and Professional Training
- Incumbent
- Assumed office March 2009
- President: Mamnoon Hussain
- Prime Minister: Nawaz Sharif

Personal details
- Born: Muhammad Idrees Khan Safi
- Party: Independent
- Occupation: Politician

Muhammad Idrees Khan Safi (Urdu: محمد ادریس خان صافی) is a Pakistani Politician and Member of Senate of Pakistan, currently serving as Chairperson- Senate Committee on Information Technology and Telecommunication.

== Political career ==
He belongs to FATA region of Pakistan, and was elected to the Senate of Pakistan in March 2009 on a general seat from FATA region. He is the chairperson of Chairperson- Senate Committee on Information Technology and Telecommunication and member of senate committees of Railways, States and Frontier Regions, Industries and Production.

== See also ==
- List of Senators of Pakistan
- Ayatullah Durrani
- Abdul Haseeb Khan
