= Usman Badini =

Pakistani politician

Mir Muhammad Usman Badini

Member of the National Assembly of Pakistan
- Incumbent
- Assumed office 29 February 2024
- Constituency: NA-260 Chagai-cum-Nushki-cum-Kharan-cum-Washuk
- In office 1 August 2017 – 31 May 2018
- Constituency: NA-260 (Quetta-cum-Chagai-cum-Mastung)

Personal details
- Party: JUI (F) (2017-present)
- Relatives: Mir Muhammad Yousaf Badini (brother)

Mir Muhammad Usman Badini (Urdu: میر محمد عثمان بادینی) is a Pakistani politician who has been a member of the National Assembly of Pakistan since February 2024 and previously served in this position from August 2017 to May 2018.

== Political career ==
He ran for the seat of Senate of Pakistan as an independent candidate in the 2009 Pakistani Senate election but was unsuccessful.

He re-ran for the seat of Senate of Pakistan as an independent candidate in the 2012 Pakistani Senate election but was unsuccessful.

He was elected to the National Assembly of Pakistan as a candidate of Jamiat Ulema-e-Islam (F) (JUI-F) from Constituency NA-260 (Quetta-cum-Chagai-cum-Nushki-cum-Mastung) in by-polls held in July 2017. He received 43,191 votes and defeated Mir Bahadur Khan, a candidate of the Balochistan National Party (BNP).
