= Saeeda Iqbal =

Pakistani politician

Senator Saeeda Iqbal سعیدہ اقبال

Chairperson- Senate Committee on Defense Production
- Incumbent
- Assumed office March 2009
- President: Mamnoon Hussain
- Prime Minister: Nawaz Sharif

Personal details
- Born: Saeeda Iqbal; 26 December 1947 (age 78) Swabi District
- Party: Pakistan Peoples Party
- Education: Ph.D.
- Occupation: Politician

Saeeda Iqbal (Urdu: سعیدہ اقبال; born 29 December 1947) is a Pakistani politician and a Member of Senate of Pakistan.

== Political career ==
She belongs to Pakistan Peoples Party, she joined the party in 2002 as the Secretary General of Party's Women Wing of the Islamabad District, and later she was elected to the Senate of Pakistan on reserved seat for women from Islamabad area. She is the chairperson of senate committee on Defense Production and member Cabinet Secretariat, Information, Broadcasting and National Heritage, Inter-Provincial Coordination and Kashmir Affairs & Gilgit Baltistan.

== See also ==
- List of Senators of Pakistan
- Ayatullah Durrani
- Abdul Haseeb Khan
