= Abdul Nabi Bangash =

Pakistani politician

Senator Abdul Nabi Bangash عبدالنبی بنگش

Chairperson- Senate Committee on Federal Education and Professional Training
- Incumbent
- Assumed office March 2009
- President: Mamnoon Hussain
- Prime Minister: Nawaz Sharif

Personal details
- Born: Abdul Nabi Bangash; August 1954 (age 72) Hangu District, Pakistan
- Party: Awami National Party
- Occupation: Politician businessman

Abdul Nabi Bangash (Urdu: عبدالنبی بنگش; born August 1954) is a Pakistani politician, businessman and member of the Senate of Pakistan, currently serving as chairperson of the Senate Committee on Federal Education and Professional Training. He belongs to Awami National Party.

== Political career ==
Born to a business family in Hangu district, he got his early education from Govt. College Kohat, where he joined the Pakhtoon Student Federation (the student wing of ANP) and later the ANP. He was elected to the Senate of Pakistan on a general seat as an ANP candidate in March 2009. He is the chairperson of the Senate Committee on Federal Education and Professional Training and member of senate committees of Petroleum and Natural Resources, Housing and Works, Overseas Pakistanis and Human Resource Development, Employees Welfare Fund.

== See also ==
- List of Senators of Pakistan
- Ayatullah Durrani
- Abdul Haseeb Khan
