= Shirala Mallick =

Pakistani politician

Senator Shirala Mallick
- Incumbent
- Assumed office March 2009
- President: Mamnoon Hussain
- Prime Minister: Nawaz Sharif

Personal details
- Born: Shirala Mallick
- Party: MQM
- Education: B.A.
- Occupation: Politician

Shirala Mallick is a Pakistani Politician and a Member of Senate of Pakistan.

== Political career ==
In March 2009, she was elected to the Senate of Pakistan on reserved seat for Women as MQM candidate. She is member of Senate committee of Information Technology and Telecommunication, Information, Broadcasting and National Heritage, Housing and Works Planning Development and Reform.

== See also ==
- List of Senators of Pakistan
- Abdul Haseeb Khan
- Hafiz Hamdullah
