= NA-260 Chagai-cum-Nushki-cum-Kharan-cum-Washuk =

Constituency of the National Assembly of Pakistan

- Constituency for the National Assembly of Pakistan
- Region: Rakhshan Division
- Electorate: 365,595

Current constituency
- Created: 2018
- Party: Jamiat Ulema-e-Islam (F)
- Member: Usman Badini
- Created from: NA-268 (Chagai-cum-Nushki-cum-Kharan); NA-270 (Panjgur-cum-Washuk-cum-Awaran)

NA-260 (Chagai-cum-Nushki-cum-Kharan-cum-Washuk) (این اے-260، چاغی-بمع-نوشکی-بمع-خاران-بمع-واشوک)is a constituency for the National Assembly of Pakistan. It comprises the districts of Chagai, Nushki and Kharan from the province of Balochistan. It was created in 2018 out of two former constituencies namely NA-268 (Chagai-cum-Nushki-cum-Kharan)
NA-270 (Panjgur-cum-Washuk-cum-Awaran)by taking out areas of Chagai and Kharan districts respectively and merging with areas of Nushki District and Washuk Districts to create this constituency.

== Assembly Segments ==
Constituency number	Constituency	District	Current MPA	Party
31	PB-31 Washuk	Washuk	Zabid Ali	JUI(F)
32	PB-32 Chagai	Chagai	Sadiq Sanjrani	BAP
33	PB-33 Kharan	Kharan	Mir Shoaib Nosherwani	PML-N
34	PB-34 Nushki	Nushki	Haji Ghulam Dastagir Badeni	JUI-F

== Members of Parliament ==
=== 2018–2023: NA-268 Chagai-cum-Nushki-cum-Kharan ===
Election	Member	Party
2018	Muhammad Hashim	BNP-M

=== 2024–present: NA-260 Chagai-cum-Nushki-cum-Kharan-cum-Washuk ===
Election	Member	Party
2024	Usman Badini	JUI(F)

== Election 2018 ==
General elections were held on 25 July 2018.

General election 2018: NA-268 Chagai-cum-Nushki-cum-Kharan
Party	Candidate	Votes	%	±%
BNP (M)	Muhammad Hashim	14,435	31.23	
MMA	Usman Badini	12,272	26.55	
Independent	Sardar Fateh Muhammad Muhammad Hassani	7,093	15.35	
PPP	Sardar Umar Gorgaij	6,932	15.00	
Others	Others (eighteen candidates)	5,485	11.87	
Turnout		48,224	20.58	
Total valid votes		46,217	95.84	
Rejected ballots		2,007	4.16	
Majority		2,163	4.68	
Registered electors		234,291		
BNP (M) win (new seat)				

== Election 2024 ==
General elections were held on 8 February 2024. Usman Badini won the election with 42,800 votes.

General election 2024: NA-260 Chagai-cum-Nushki-cum-Kharan-cum-Washuk
Party	Candidate	Votes	%	±%
JUI (F)	Usman Badini	42,800	25.15	N/A
PML(N)	Sardar Fateh Muhammad Muhammad Hassani	35,629	20.94	▲10.92
BNP (M)	Muhammad Hashim	27,940	16.42	▼14.81
Independent	Ejaz Sanjrani	26,926	15.82	N/A
PPP	Abdul Qadir Baloch	23,869	14.03	▼0.97
Others	Others (twenty candidates)	13,013	7.65	
Turnout		177,516	48.56	▲27.98
Total valid votes		170,177	95.87	
Rejected ballots		7,339	4.13	
Majority		7,171	4.21	
Registered electors		365,595		
JUI (F) gain from BNP (M)				

== See also ==
- NA-259 Kech-cum-Gwadar
- NA-261 Surab-cum-Kalat-cum-Mastung
