= Heman Dass =

Pakistani politician

Senator Heman Dass
- Incumbent
- Assumed office March 2012
- President: Mamnoon Hussain
- Prime Minister: Nawaz Sharif

Personal details
- Born: Heman Dass
- Party: Jameet Ulema Islam (F)
- Occupation: Politician

Heman Dass (Urdu: ہیمان داس) is a Pakistani Politician and a Member of Senate of Pakistan.

== Political career ==
He belongs to Baluchistan Province. In March 2012 he was elected to the Senate of Pakistan on reserved seat for minority as Jameet Ulema Islam (F) candidate. He is a member of Senate committee of National Health Services, Regulations and Coordination, Federal Education and Professional Training, Planning Development and Reform and Functional Committee on Human Rights.

== See also ==
- List of Senators of Pakistan
- Ayatullah Durrani
- Hafiz Hamdullah
- Hinduism in Pakistan
