= Zahida Khan (Pakistani politician) =

Pakistani politician

Senator Zahida Khan

Member of the Senate of Pakistan
- Incumbent
- Assumed office March 2012

Personal details
- Party: Awami National Party

Zahida Khan (Urdu: زاہدہ خان) is a Pakistani politician who has been a member of Senate of Pakistan since March 2012.

Daughter of Muhammad Sher Khan Anp

She is aunt to Noorena Shams and sister in law of Muhammad Basheer khan and Hidayatullah

== Education ==
She received matriculation level education in 1995.

== Political career ==
She was elected to the Senate of Pakistan as a candidate of Awami National Party in the 2012 Pakistani Senate election.
