= Ahmad Saeed Kirmani =

Pakistani politician and lawyer

Syed Ahmad Saeed Kirmani was a Pakistani politician and lawyer who was the West Pakistan Minister for Finance, Information, Excise, Taxation, and Railways between 1966 and 1969.

== Career ==
He was a member of the Punjab Legislative Assembly between 1951 and 1955 and the West Pakistan Assembly between 1956 and 1958 and again from 1962 to 1966. He also served as ambassador of Pakistan to the Arab Republic of Egypt and North Yemen from 1974 to 1977.

He began his political career as secretary of the Punjab Muslim Student Federation from 1943-47, during which time he was also jailed twice. He was among those who popularised the Muslim League as a student leader in Punjab from 1940-47.

He sought direct guidance during Pakistan Movement from the Quaid-e-Azam, and was close to him as a student leader.

He represented Pakistan in several international conferences, and visited China in 1968 as a member of a high-powered delegation.

He remained a member of the All India Muslim League Council (nominated from the students quota by Jinnah from 1945-48, a member of the Pakistan Muslim League Council from 1948-88, West Pakistan Muslim League Parliamentary Party secretary from 1957-58, and a member of the PML Working Committee from 1965-88).

He served as president of the West Pakistan Convention Muslim League from 1968-69. He also remained a patron of the Nazaria-i-Pakistan Forum from 2002 to date, and has been chief convener of the Nazariati Muslim League Workers Council since 1985.

In 1946, he was sent as a delegate to the All India Muslim League Convention, where the 1940 Lahore Resolution was reshaped.

He was a member of a team of lawyers headed by the late Zafarullah Khan, which argued the Muslim League's case before the Punjab Boundary Commission in May 1947.

Ahmad Saeed Kirmani was also among the members of the Muslim League Election Tribunal set up by Pakistan's first prime minister, Liaquat Ali Khan.He enrolled as a Supreme Court advocate in October 1957 and was elected Lahore High Court Bar Association president 1980-81.

Kirmani was appointed envoy to Egypt and North Yemen from 1974-77 and awarded a Hilal-i-Khidmat by the government of Pakistan in 1968.

== Personal life ==
His son, Asif Kirmani, is a member of the Senate of Pakistan. His grandson is Aftab Kirmani.
