= Muhammad Hashim (politician) =

Pakistani politician

Member of the National Assembly of Pakistan
- In office 13 August 2018 – 10 August 2023
- Constituency: NA-268 (Chagai-cum-Nushki-cum-Kharan)

Personal details
- Party: PPP (2025-present)
- Other political affiliations: BNP(M) (2018-2025)

Muhammad Hashim is a Pakistani politician who had been a member of the National Assembly of Pakistan from August 2018 till August 2023.

== Political career ==
He was elected to the National Assembly of Pakistan from Constituency NA-268 (Chagai-cum-Nushki-cum-Kharan) as a candidate of Balochistan National Party (Mengal) in 2018 Pakistani general election.
