= Daud Khan Achakzai =

Pakistani Senator from Baluchistan

Muhammad Daud Khan Achakzai
- محمد داؤد خان اچکزئی

8th Member of the Senate of Pakistan
- Incumbent
- Assumed office March 2, 2012
- Constituency: General seat from Balochistan

Personal details
- Born: 19 February 1976 (age 50) Killa Abdullah, Balochistan, Pakistan
- Party: Awami National Party (ANP)
- Education: University of Balochistan

Muhammad Daud Khan Achakzai (Urdu: محمد داؤد خان اچکزئی) is a Pakistani Senator from Baluchistan.

== Political career ==
He belongs to Baluchistan province. In March 2012 he was elected to the Senate of Pakistan on general seat as Awami National Party (ANP) candidate. He is the chairperson of senate committee on communication and member of Senate Committee on Information, Broadcasting and National Heritage, Law and Justice, Defence Production, Select Committee.

== See also ==
- List of Senators of Pakistan
- Ayatullah Durrani
- Abdul Haseeb Khan
