= Farah Aqil =

Pakistani politician

Senator Farah Aqil فرح عاقل

Chairperson- Senate Committee on Inter-Provincial Coordination
- Incumbent
- Assumed office March 2009
- President: Mamnoon Hussain
- Prime Minister: Nawaz Sharif

Personal details
- Born: Farah Aqil
- Party: Awami National Party
- Education: M.A (Psychology)
- Occupation: Politician

Farah Aqil (Urdu: فرح عاقل) is a Pakistani Politician and a Member of Senate of Pakistan, currently serving as Chairperson Senate Committee on Inter-Provincial Coordination.

== Political career ==
She belongs to Awami National Party and was elected to the Senate of Pakistan on reserved seat for women. She is the chairperson of Chairperson Senate Committee on Inter-Provincial Coordination and member of Senate Committee of National Health Services, Regulations and Coordination, Science and Technology, Information, Broadcasting and National Heritage, she has previously served as MPA in KPK Assembly in 2001-2002.

== See also ==
- List of Senators of Pakistan
- List of committees of the Senate of Pakistan
