= Syed Zafar Ali Shah (senator) =

Pakistani politician

Syed Zafar Ali Shah Senator

Syed Zafar Ali Shah (Urdu: سید ظفر علی شاہ) is a Pakistani politician who has been member of the Senate of Pakistan, the National Assembly of Pakistan and the Provincial Assembly of the Punjab.

== Political career ==
He was elected to the National Assembly of Pakistan from NA-48 on PML-N ticket in 1997 general election.

He ran for the seat of National Assembly on PML-N ticket in 2002 general election but was unsuccessful.

He was elected to the Senate of Pakistan in 2009 where he served until 2015.

In 2015, he ran for the chairmanship in local body elections in Islamabad but was unsuccessful.

In 2018, he joined Pakistan Tehreek-e-Insaf.
