= Taj Haider =

Pakistani politician (1942–2025)

Taj Haider SI

Senate of Pakistan from Sindh
- In office 5 July 1995 – 8 August 2000
- Preceded by: Kamaluddin Azfar
- Succeeded by: Farhatullah Babar

Personal details
- Born: Taj Haider; 8 March 1942 Kotah, Kotah State, Rajputana Agency, India (now Rajasthan, India)
- Died: April 8, 2025 (aged 83) Karachi, Sindh, Pakistan
- Citizenship: Pakistani citizenship
- Party: PPP (1967–2025)
- Education: Karachi University
- Occupation: Politician, writer, playwright, mathematician
- Profession: Professor of mathematics
- Committees: Member of Senate standing committee on Industries, Production, Energy, Education, Scientific and Technological Research
- Awards: Sitara-i-Imtiaz (Star of Excellence) Award by the President of Pakistan in 2013
- Fields: Mathematics
- Institutions: University of Karachi; DJ Science College; Pakistan Academy of Letters; Pakistan Mathematical Society; Pakistan Television Corporation
- Known for: Work in political Literature of Pakistan, mathematics, and Pakistan and its Nuclear Deterrent Program
- Notable awards: PTV Awards (2006); Sitara-i-Imtiaz (2013)

Taj Haider, SI (Urdu: تاج حيدر; 8 March 1942 – 8 April 2025) was a Pakistani left-wing politician, nationalist, playwright, mathematician, versatile scholar and Marxist intellectual. He was one of the founding members of Pakistan People's Party (PPP) and was the general-secretary of the PPP from 2023 to 2025 after the office was vacated by Nayyar Hussain Bukhari.

A mathematician and scientist by profession, Haider provided vital leadership in the formative years of clandestine atomic bomb projects in the 1970s. He was also noted for his writing of political plays for the Pakistan Television (PTV) from 1979 to 1985.

== Biography ==
=== Education ===
Haider was born on 8 March 1942 in Kotah, Rajasthan, British India. His family migrated to the Dominion of Pakistan following the partition of India in 1947. After graduating from a local high school, Haider ultimately enrolled in Karachi University in 1959. He studied mathematics at the Karachi University and graduated with a BSc (hons) in Mathematics in 1962.

In 1965, he earned his MSc in mathematics from the same institution and opted to teach mathematics at a local college, later moving to Karachi University. During his career at the Karachi University, Haider primarily taught and focused on the ordinary differential equations and topics in multivariable calculus.

=== PPP and political activism ===
During the attendance of 1967 socialist convention, Haider was one of the founding members of the Pakistan Peoples Party (PPP) and committed himself as a vehement supporter of change by the left-oriented philosophy of Zulfiqar Ali Bhutto. In the 1970s, he played a vital role in formulating the public policy concerning the atomic bomb projects.

On multiple occasions, he provided his expertise on taking moral stance on nuclear weapons initiatives at the diplomatic conventions. On nuclear weapons development, Haider stated that "there was a need to aggressively project the peaceful intent of Pakistan's atomic bomb program."

Haider disassociated himself from the politics but remained member of Pakistan Mathematical Society and shifted towards writing political dramas at the Pakistan Television (PTV) in 1979. The PTV aired various political dramas written by Haider until 1985 when he renewed his association with PPP. In 1990–2000, he contributed to PPP-initiated industrial projects such as the establishment of Heavy Mechanical Complex (HMC), Hub Dam and various other social programmes. He was elected to the Senate of Pakistan in 1995.

In 2001, Haider returned to his literary activities after rejoining the PTV, and penned two political drama serials for the PTV which were aired in 2003. In 2004, he returned to politics in opposition to President of Pakistan Pervez Musharraf over the issue of nuclear proliferation. He bitterly criticised the United States over the sanctions of KRL and was one of the noted politicians expressing the discontent with the US, along with Raza Rabbani in 2004. About the nuclear proliferation case, Haider defended the case of Abdul Qadeer Khan in the public and condemned the Information minister, Rashid Ahmad's statement of acquitting former Prime minister Benazir Bhutto in the nuclear proliferation case.

Ultimately, he called for a parliamentary inquiry on that issue, and questioned the involvement of President General Pervez Musharraf in the proliferation case. In 2006, Haider was awarded PTV Awards for Best Playwright Serial award, which he received in a televised ceremony.

=== Writing and philosophy ===
Haider extensively wrote on nuclear policy issues, left-wing ideas, literary and political philosophy. His more recent writings had included the support of social democracy in the country and power of balance in each state institution. In literary and political circles, he wrote critic articles against the military dictatorship, specifically policies enforced by the conservative President General Zia-ul-Haq throughout the 1980s.

Haider opposed the ethnically based politics of the leader of Muttahida Qaumi Movement or MQM, Altaf Hussain based in Karachi by reportedly stating on one occasion, "We were not Mohajirs but Urdu-speaking citizens of this province and this country. Our mother-tongue was the official and national language of Pakistan and it would be wrong and degrading to consider ourselves as lesser citizens or Mohajirs.

=== Death ===
Haider was admitted to the intensive care unit at Ziauddin Hospital in Karachi whilst battling cancer. He died on 8 April 2025, at the age of 83.

== Honours and awards ==
- Sitara-e-Imtiaz (Star of Excellence) Award by the President of Pakistan (2013).
- 13th PTV Awards for Best Playwright Serial award (2006)

Selected articles

- Haider, Taj. "CTBT Security Perspectives" Dawn Newspapers, 27 March 2000.
- Haider, Taj. "Setting the PPP record straight", Express Tribune 2013.
- Haider, Taj. "Why the PPP is boycotting the presidential election", 16 July 2013

Television plays

- Jinhein Raaste Main Khabar Hui
- Lab-e-Darya

== See also ==
- Pakistan Peoples Party
- Left-wing politics
- Pakistan Academy of Letters
- Pakistan Mathematical Society
- Pakistan and its Nuclear Deterrent Program
