= Muhammad Shahi =

Brahui tribe in Pakistan

The Muhammad Shahi (Brahui: محمد شاہی) is an ethnic Brahui tribe that resides in Balochistan province of Pakistan, belonging to the Sarawani branch of the Brahui tribes. The tribe resides in the Sarawan region and predominantly speaks Brahui.

== Bibliography ==
- Elfenbein, Josef (1989). "Brahui". In Yarshater, Ehsan (ed.). Encyclopædia Iranica. Vol. IV/4: Bolbol I–Brick. London and New York: Routledge & Kegan Paul. pp. 433–443. ISBN 978-0-71009-127-7.
- Scholz, Fred (2002) [1974]. Nomadism & colonialism : a hundred years of Baluchistan, 1872-1972. Karachi; Oxford; New York: Oxford University Press. ISBN 978-0-19-579638-4.
