= Khalida Parveen =

Pakistani politician

Senator Khalida Parveen

Member of the Senate of Pakistan
- Incumbent
- Assumed office March 2012

Personal details
- Party: Pakistan Peoples Party

Khalida Parveen (Urdu: خالدہ پروین) is a Pakistani politician who has been a member of the Senate of Pakistan since March 2012.

== Education ==
She received a Bachelor of Arts from Bahauddin Zakariya University in 1984.

== Political career ==
She was elected to the Senate of Pakistan as a candidate of the Pakistan Peoples Party in the 2012 Pakistani Senate election.
