= Muhammad Zafar Ullah Khan Dhandla =

Pakistani politician

Senator Muhammad Zafar Ullah Khan Dhandla

Member of the Senate of Pakistan
- Incumbent
- Assumed office March 2012

Personal details
- Party: Pakistan Muslim League (N)

Muhammad Zafar Ullah Khan Dhandla is a Pakistani politician who has been a member of Senate of Pakistan since March 2012.

== Political career ==
He was elected to the Senate of Pakistan as candidate of Pakistan Muslim League (N) in the 2012 Pakistani Senate election.
