= Ghous Bux Brohi =

Pakistani musician from Sindh, Pakistan

Ghous Bux Brohi غوث بخش بروهي
- Origin: Sindh, Pakistan
- Occupation: Musician
- Instrument: Bansuri (Pakistani flute)

Ghous Bux Brohi
- Awards: Pride of Performance Award by the Government of Pakistan in 2009

Ghous Bux Brohi (Sindhi: غوث بخش بروهي) (Urdu : غوث بخش بروہی) is a Pakistani musician (flute player) from Sindh, Pakistan.

== Career ==
Ghous Bux Brohi is a popular bansuri (flute) player. He has performed at musical and cultural shows all over the country. He performed on the occasion of Lok Mela, a cultural festival, organized by Lok Virsa in Islamabad.

== Awards ==
- Pride of Performance Award in 2009 by the Government of Pakistan
