= Naseema Ehsan =

Pakistani politician

Senator Naseema Ehsan

Member of the Senate of Pakistan
- Incumbent
- Assumed office 11 March 2012

Personal details
- Other party: BNP(M) (2021-2024)
- Spouse: Syed Ehsan Shah

Naseema Ehsan (Urdu: نسیمہ احسان) is a Pakistani politician who has been a member of Senate of Pakistan since March 2012.

== Political career ==
She was elected to the Senate of Pakistan as candidate of Balochistan National Party Awami in the 2012 Pakistani Senate election.
