= Saeed Ul Hassan Mandokhail =

Pakistani politician

Senator Saeed Ul Hassan Mandokhail

Member of the Senate of Pakistan
- Incumbent
- Assumed office March 2012

Personal details
- Party: Pakistan Muslim League (Q)

Saeed Ul Hassan Mandokhail (Urdu: سعید الحسن مندوخیل) is a Pakistani politician who has been a member of Senate of Pakistan since March 2012.

== Political career ==
He was elected to the Senate of Pakistan as a candidate of Pakistan Muslim League (Q) in the 2012 Pakistani Senate election.
