= Talha Mahmood =

Pakistani politician

- طلحہ محمود

Minister for Religious Affairs and Inter-faith Harmony
- In office 20 April 2022 – 10 August 2023
- President: Arif Alvi
- Prime Minister: Shehbaz Sharif
- Preceded by: Abdul Shakoor

Member of the Senate of Pakistan
- Incumbent
- Assumed office 25 July 2025
- Constituency: Khyber Pakhtunkhwa
- In office 12 March 2018 – 12 March 2024
- Constituency: Khyber Pakhtunkhwa
- In office 12 March 2012 – 11 March 2018
- Constituency: Khyber Pakhtunkhwa
- In office 12 March 2006 – 11 March 2012
- Constituency: Khyber Pakhtunkhwa

Chairperson of the Senate Standing Committee on Cabinet Secretariat
- In office 12 March 2012 – 12 March 2024

Personal details
- Born: 1 November 1960 (age 65) Islamabad, Pakistan
- Party: PPP (2024-present)
- Other political affiliations: JUI (F) (2006-2024)
- Education: Punjab University

Muhammad Talha Mahmood (Urdu: محمد طلحہ محمود c. 1 November 1960) is a Pakistani politician, who was the Federal Minister for Religious Affairs and Inter-faith Harmony, in office from 20 April 2022 till 10 August 2023.

He was also a member of the Senate of Pakistan from Hazara Division of Khyber Pakhtunkhwa.

In 2024, he joined the Pakistan People's Party (PPP) after spending 18 years affiliated with Jamiat Ulema-e-Islam (F).

== Career ==
In 2006, he was elected to the Senate of Pakistan and his re-election followed in 2012.

He obtained his degree from Punjab University in 1984.

He is the founder and chairman of ACM Group, Pakistan's largest manufacturer of batteries.

He was Deputy Parliamentary Leader of JUI-F (Jamiat Ulema-e-Islam). Additionally, he held key responsibilities as the Chairperson of the Senate Standing Committee for Narcotics Control and Interior.

Furthermore, he contributes his expertise as a member of several important Senate standing committees, including Senate Standing Committee on Cabinet Secretariat and Capital Administration and Development, Petroleum and Natural Resources, and Ministry of Finance.

He was successfully re-elected to the Senate in the 2018 Senate election, ensuring his membership in the upper house until March 2024.

Alongside his political engagements, he is also associated with the Talha Mahmood Foundation.

He contested the 2024 Pakistani general election from NA-1 Upper Chitral-cum-Lower Chitral as a candidate of JUI-F, but was unsuccessful. He received 43,127 votes and was defeated by Abdul Latif, an independent candidate.

On 26 March 2024, he joined the Pakistan People's Party (PPP) after spending the first 18 years of his political career with JUI-F (Jamiat Ulema-e-Islam).

In August 2025, Talha Mahmood was re-elected to the Senate of Pakistan, this time as a candidate of the Pakistan People's Party (PPP). His election came under a seat-sharing arrangement between the provincial government and opposition parties in the Khyber Pakhtunkhwa Assembly.

He secured one of the general seats by receiving 17 votes in the delayed Senate elections, which were originally scheduled for March 2024. The elections were postponed due to legal disputes over the allocation of reserved seats and were eventually held following intervention by the Supreme Court of Pakistan.

== Minister of Religious Affairs ==
He assumed office of Federal Minister for Religious Affairs and Inter-faith Harmony after the death of Mufti Abdul Shakoor on 15 April 2023.
