= Sardar Muhammad Shafiq Tareen =

Pakistani politician

EX Tehsil nazim & Current Senator Sardar Muhammad Shafiq Tareen

Member of the Senate of Pakistan
- Incumbent
- Assumed office 12 March 2018

Personal details
- Party: Pashtunkhwa Milli Awami Party

Sardar Muhammad Shafiq Tareen is a Pakistani politician who has been a Member of the Senate of Pakistan since March 2018.

== Political career ==
Sardar Shafiq Tareen is Affiliated to Pashtoonkhwa Milli Awami Party. He was elected as Tehsil Nazim Dukki in 2007 local bodies election. He also contested the General Elections in 2013 and stood runner-up. Tareen was elected to the Senate of Pakistan as an independent candidate on general seat from Balochistan in the 2018 Pakistani Senate election. He took oath as Senator on 12 March 2018.
