= Gholam Ghaus Z. =

Gholam Ghaus Z
- Born: Gholam Ghaus Z
- Arrested: Afghanistan
- Released: 2008
- Status: released

Gholam Ghaus Z. was a German citizen wrongly imprisoned for over four months in the Bagram Theater Internment Facility in Afghanistan. According to Der Spiegel Gholam Z. is of Afghan background and was arrested when visiting Afghan relatives. According to Deutsche Welle he is from the German city of Wuppertal.

Der Spiegel reports that the 41-year-old Gholam Z. had taken early retirement, due to medical problems. A second Der Spiegel report states that his Kabul relatives told him that, as a German citizen, he could shop in the supermarket in the American base in Kabul without any problems:

Gholam Z. borrowed a relative's car to go on, what a security expert called, his "fatal shopping trip." He planned to buy a razor, among other items. According to his version of events, he drove up to the military base on Jan. 4, showed the guard his German passport and was then allowed to pass through several security checkpoints without incident.

It reported that German security officials who investigated his background in Germany, and who interviewed him in Afghanistan, were satisfied that there was no evidence of any tie to terrorism. Nevertheless, the USA told German officials that he could not be released unless Germany provided assurances of measures that amounted to "round the clock surveillance".

Der Spiegel reported that the USA had been holding Gholam Ghaus Z. for approximately four months, and that his continued detention had been putting a strain on the relationship between Germany and the USA. Der Spiegel compared his detention to that of Murat Kurnaz.

After talks with United States Secretary of State Condoleezza Rice, German Foreign Minister Frank-Walter Steinmeier stated:

"We hope that we can soon bring this case to a happy ending."

On 2008-05-31, Der Spiegel reports that Gholam Ghaus Z. finally was released and brought to Germany.

== See also ==
- Murat Kurnaz
