= Rozi Khan Kakar =

Pakistani politician

Nazim Zarghoon Town
- In office March 2005 – March 2010

Member of the Senate of Pakistan
- In office March 2012 – March 2018

General Secretary PPP BALOCHISTAN
- In office June 2021 – June 2024

Personal details
- Born: 20 March 1969 (age 57) Quetta, Balochistan Province, south-Pakistan
- Citizenship: Pakistan
- Party: PPP (1995-Present)
- Children: Jahanzaib Khan Kakar
- Education: University of Balochistan
- Occupation: Politician

Rozi Khan Kakar (Urdu: روزی خان کاکڑ) is a Pakistani politician, and chief of the Sultanzai tribe. He has been a member of Senate of Pakistan from March 2012 to March 2018.

== Education ==
He has the degree of Bachelor of Laws and a degree of the Master of Arts.

== Political career ==
He was elected to the Senate of Pakistan as a candidate of Pakistan Peoples Party in 2012 Pakistani Senate election.
