= Muhammad Saleh Shah =

Pakistani politician

Senator Muhammad Saleh Shah محمد صالح شاہ

Chairperson- Senate Committee on Law and Justice
- In office March 2012 – March 2018
- President: Mamnoon Hussain
- Prime Minister: Nawaz Sharif
- In office March 2006 – March 2012

Personal details
- Born: Muhammad Saleh Shah
- Party: Independent
- Education: Darul Uloom Haqqania
- Occupation: Politician

Muhammad Saleh Shah (Urdu: محمد صالح شاہ) is a Pakistani Politician and Member of Senate of Pakistan, currently serving as Chairperson- Senate Committee on States and Frontier Regions.

== Political career ==
He belongs to FATA region of Pakistan, and was elected to the Senate of Pakistan in March 2012 on a general seat from FATA as Independent candidate. He is the chairperson of Senate Committee on States and Frontier Regions and member of senate committees of Religious Affairs and Interfaith Harmony, Housing and Works, Planning Development and Reform. He had been a senator previously from 2006 to 2012.

== See also ==
- List of Senators of Pakistan
- List of committees of the Senate of Pakistan
