= Osman Saifullah =

Pakistani politician

Senator Osman Saifullah Khan

Member of the Senate of Pakistan
- In office March 2012 – March 2018

Personal details
- Party: Pakistan People's Party
- Parent: Anwar Saifullah Khan (father)
- Education: Stanford Graduate School of Business University of Oxford

Osman Saifullah Khan (Urdu: عثمان سیف اللہ خان) is a Pakistani politician and industrialist who was a member of the Senate of Pakistan from March 2012 to March 2018.

== Early life and education ==
Khan was born to Anwar Saifullah Khan. His grandfather, Ghulam Ishaq Khan, was the president in the early 1990s.

He received a master's degree in engineering, economics, and management from Christ Church, Oxford, in 1995 and a degree of Master of Business Administration from the Stanford Graduate School of Business in 2009.

== Political career ==
He was elected to the Senate of Pakistan as a candidate of the Pakistan Peoples Party in the 2012 Pakistani Senate election.

After he was named in the 2016 Panama Papers leak, it was reported that he could lose his Senate seat for not declaring his offshore companies in the details of his assets submitted to the Election Commission of Pakistan.

As of 11th October 2026 he has been appointed as advisor for Energy & Power, Planning & Development for the Government of Khyber Pakhtunkhwa after implementation of emergency and governor rule.
