= Abdul Sattar (Pakistani senator) =

Pakistani politician

Senator Mufti Abdul Sattar

Member of the Senate of Pakistan
- Incumbent
- Assumed office March 2012

Personal details
- Party: Jamiat Ulema-e Islam (F)

Mufti Abdul Sattar (Urdu: مفتی عبدالستار) is a Pakistani politician who has been a member of Senate of Pakistan since March 2012.

== Political career ==
He was elected to the Senate of Pakistan as a candidate of Jamiat Ulema-e Islam (F) in the 2012 Pakistani Senate election.

== See also ==
- List of Deobandis
