= Sehar Kamran =

Pakistani politician

MNA Sehar Kamran

Member of the National Assembly of Pakistan
- Incumbent
- Assumed office 29 February 2024

Member of the Senate of Pakistan
- In office 12 March 2012 – 11 March 2018

Personal details
- Party: PPP (2012-present)
- Spouse: Mr. Kamran
- Occupation: Politician, educator

Sehar Kush Kamran (Urdu: سحر کوش کامران) is a Pakistani politician who was a member of the Senate of Pakistan from March 2012 to March 2018. She is currently serving her second term from February 2024. She became known globally online in 2020 thanks to the Wow Grape meme, which originated from an event she presided over as principal of the Pakistani International School Jeddah in July 2011. In 2022, Kamran decided to auction off an NFT of the meme and pledged to donate her share of the proceeds to flood victims in Pakistan.

== Education ==
She holds the degree of Bachelor of Arts which she received from the University of Karachi in 1987. During her studies at the University of Karachi, she served as President of Peoples Students Federation, the student wing of the Pakistan People's Party.

== Career ==
Kamran joined the Pakistan International School Jeddah – English Section (PISJ-ES), located in Jeddah, Saudi Arabia, as an accountant in 1999.

In 2012, Pakistan Peoples Party (PPP) decided to award her ticket for contesting in the 2012 Pakistani Senate election. While serving as principal of the school, she was elected to the Senate of Pakistan as a candidate of PPP on reserved seats for women in the 2012 Pakistani Senate election. Then secretary of the Election Commission of Pakistan said that if Kamran was continuing her job as principal of the school after her election as a senator, her act was unconstitutional and illegal. Raja Zafar-ul-Haq, then Leader of the Senate of Pakistan criticised Kamran for holding two public service positions saying that "she did not disclose she was the principal of a school when she elected to the Senate" and added that "Pakistani law forbids a senator from holding another public service job."

She remained principal of the school until November 2013 when she was sacked from her position by Pakistan's Ambassador to Saudi Arabia Muhammad Naeem Khan, reasons cited were corruption and nepotism. She allegedly spent 170,000 Saudi riyals of school funds on a vehicle for personal use.

In 2014, the National Accountability Bureau (NAB) filed a corruption reference against Kamran and decided to probe into the allegation in coordination with the Ministry of Foreign Affairs. However, Foreign Office refused to cooperate with the NAB. Reportedly, Kamran used her political connections to not let the case proceed against her. In January 2016, The High Court of Sindh granted her protective-cum-transitory bail in NAB inquiry pertaining to corruption.

She continued to serve as Senator till completion of her six-year term in 2018. PPP decided to not give her ticket for contesting in the 2018 Pakistani Senate election.
