= Humayun Khan Mandokhel =

Pakistani politician

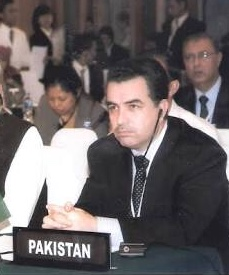
- Mandokhel representing Pakistan at a political humanitarian seminar conference in Sri Lanka.

Personal details
- Born: 19 February 1962 (age 64) Zhob, Baluchistan, Pakistan
- Party: Pakistan Tehreek-e-Insaf
- Education: University of Engineering & Technology, Lahore
- Occupation: Politician • Engineer • Businessman

Humayun Khan Mandokhel (Urdu: حمايون خان مندوخيل) is a Pakistani Politician who served as an independent Senator from 2009 till 2015 from Balochistan, Pakistan. He held the portfolios of various Senate committees as Chairman and remained an advocate of change in the institutions of the country.

== Early life ==
Mandokhel was born on 19 February 1962 in Zhob, Pakistan to father Saadullah Khan Mandokhel, Founder of SKB Engineering & Technology and political activist of Muslim League (Qayyum). Mandokhel was raised in a tribe known for the practice of Pashtunwali and Islamic rituals. He now claims Pashtunwali to be an integral part of his life but condemns division based on ethnicity or cast.

== Education ==
Mandokhel completed his primary and secondary education from St. Francis Grammar School Quetta before completing his FSc. from Govt. Science College, Quetta. After graduating from college, Mandokhel did his civil engineering from University of Engineering & Technology, Lahore.

== Political career ==
Mandokhel first filled office as Senator in 2009 as an independent candidate from Zhob, Balochistan. For the first few years of his reign, Mandokhel was part of the government where he raised voice for various issues, the opposition of route deviation in CPEC being the greatest of them. It was not until 2015 when Mandokhel joined Pakistan Tehreek-e-Insaf making it his first political party ever and him the first ever Senator to have served the party.
