= Jehangir Bader =

Pakistani politician

Senator Jehangir Bader جہانگیر بدر

Chairperson-Senate Committee on Parliamentary Affairs
- In office March 2009 – March 2015
- President: Mamnoon Hussain
- Prime Minister: Raja Pervaiz Ashraf

Personal details
- Born: 25 October 1944 Lahore, British Raj, now Punjab, Pakistan
- Died: 14 November 2016 (aged 72) Lahore, Punjab, Pakistan
- Party: Pakistan Peoples Party
- Spouse: Rakhshanda Jehangir
- Children: Ali Bader, Mariam Jehangir Bader, Jehanzeb Bader,
- Education: Hailey College; University of the Punjab
- Occupation: Politician

Jehangir Bader (Urdu: جہانگیر بدر) was a Pakistani politician and member of Senate of Pakistan, he served as Chairperson-Senate Committee on Parliamentary Affairs. Affiliated with Pakistan Peoples Party since its inception, Jehangir Bader started his political career with the then PPP chairman Zulfiqar Ali Bhutto.

He died on Sunday, 14 November 2016 due to cardiac arrest.

== Early life ==
Jehangir Bader was born in Lahore in an Arain family on 25 October 1944. He was active in student politics in his University days.

== Political career ==
Jahangir Badar started his political career with Pakistan Peoples Party. He met Zulfiqar Ali Bhutto during General Yahya Khan's regime. Jahangir was arrested for protesting against Yahya regime. He was also arrested for anti-dictatorship protests by General Zia-Ul-Haq and General Pervez Musharaff. Badar was a central figure in PPP's leadership. He held position of Provincial president of Punjab's PPP chapter and General secretary of Pakistan Peoples Party.

He was first elected to the National Assembly of Pakistan in the General Elections of 1988 from Lahore as Pakistan Peoples Party candidate, and was appointed Federal Minister for Petroleum & Natural Resources, Housing & works And Science & Technology by Prime Minister Benazir Bhutto. He was elected to the Senate of Pakistan in 1994 and was assigned the portfolio of Federal Minister for Political Affairs and Religious Affairs.

He was re-elected to the Senate of Pakistan in March 2009 on a general seat as Pakistan Peoples Party candidate. He was the chairperson of Senate Committee on Parliamentary Affairs and member of senate committees of Foreign Affairs, Petroleum and Natural Resources, Law and Justice. He was the Secretary General of Pakistan Peoples Party from 2001 to 2010.

== Death ==
Badar died on 14 November 2016 on his way to hospital, after having a heart attack. He was facing cardiac and kidney disorders. He died at 72 and funeral was offered at Punjab University, Lahore.

== See also ==
- List of Senators of Pakistan
- List of committees of the Senate of Pakistan
- Arains
- Federal Minister
