= Aurangzeb Khan =

Pakistani politician

Senator Aurangzeb Khan

Member of the Senate of Pakistan
- Incumbent
- Assumed office March 2015

Aurangzeb Khan

(Urdu: اورنگزیب خان) is a Pakistani politician who has been a member of Senate of Pakistan since March 2015.

== Personal life ==
Khan is a businessman with operations primarily in the United Arab Emirates (UAE). Now MPA of Orakzai PK94. He initially moved to Dubai for work and has since established a business presence in the region, reportedly owning around eight branches in various sectors. Khan’s career trajectory from an initial labor position to a successful business owner is noted in several sources. His business achievements have been recognized in the UAE, where he is seen as a figure of entrepreneurial success.

== Political career ==
He was elected to the Senate of Pakistan as an independent candidate in the 2015 Pakistani Senate election.
