= Karim Ahmed Khawaja =

Pakistani politician

Senator Karim Ahmed Khawaja

Member of the Senate of Pakistan
- Incumbent
- Assumed office March 2012

Personal details
- Party: Pakistan Peoples Party

Karim Ahmed Khawaja (Urdu: کریم احمد خواجہ) is a Pakistani politician who has been a member of Senate of Pakistan since March 2012.

== Political career ==
He was elected to the Senate of Pakistan as a candidate of Pakistan Peoples Party in the 2012 Pakistani Senate election.
