= Ghulam Ghaus Khan =

Captain Ghulam Ghaus Khan of Rawalpindi District, Pakistan was a pakistani freedom fighter belonging to the famous Khatar Khan family of Rawalpindi District.

== Early life ==
Khan was the son of Captain Boota Khan of Rawalpindi and studied at the Indian Military Academy, Dehradun.

== Career ==
He was commissioned as an officer in the British Indian Army. He joined Indian National Army (INA) with the several British Indian soldiers and took command of Rangoon (Burma). Later, he became the Brigadier and then the Commander Administrator of Rangoon.

== Death ==
He died on 17 January 2005 in Islamabad Pakistan.
