= Islamuddin Shaikh =

Pakistani politician

Senator Islamuddin Shaikh

Member of the Senate of Pakistan
- Incumbent
- Assumed office March 2009

Personal details
- Party: Pakistan Peoples Party

Islamuddin Shaikh (Urdu: اسلام الدین شیخ) is senior Pakistani politician who has been a member of Senate of Pakistan since March 2015. His son Nouman Islam Shaikh is MNA since 2008 till now.

== Political career ==
He was elected to the Senate of Pakistan as a candidate of Pakistan Peoples Party (PPP) in the 2009 Pakistani Senate election.

He was re-elected to the Senate of Pakistan as a candidate of PPP in the 2015 Pakistani Senate election.
