= Mohammad Yousaf (Pakistani politician) =

Pakistani politician

Senator Mohammad Yousaf (Pakistani politician)
- President: Mamnoon Hussain
- Prime Minister: Nawaz Sharif

Mohammad Yousaf (Urdu: محمد یوسف) is a Pakistani politician and Member of Senate of Pakistan, serving as Chairperson-Senate Committee on Petroleum and Resources.

== Political career ==
He belongs to Baluchistan province of Pakistan, and was elected to the Senate in March 2012 on a general seat as Pakistan Peoples Party candidate. He is the chairperson of Senate Committee on Petroleum and Natural Resources and member of senate committees of Interior and Narcotics Control, National Food Security and Research, Inter-Provincial Coordination.

== See also ==
- List of Senators of Pakistan
- List of committees of the Senate of Pakistan
