= Asif Kirmani =

Pakistani politician

Senator Asif Kirmani
- آصف کرمانی

Member of the Senate of Pakistan
- In office 12 March 2018 – 12 March 2024
- Constituency: General seat from Punjab
- In office 21 August 2017 – 12 March 2018
- Constituency: General seat from Punjab

Personal details
- Party: Independent (2024-present)
- Other political affiliations: PMLN (2018-2024)
- Spouse: Usna Safdar
- Children: Aftab Kirmani
- Parent: Ahmad Saeed Kirmani (father)

Syed Asif Saeed Kirmani (Urdu: سید آصف سعید کرمانی) is a Pakistani politician and businessman who has been a Member of Senate of Pakistan, since July 2017 and served as the Minister of State for Political Affairs. He is the son of Pakistan Movement leader Ahmad Saeed Kirmani.

== Political career ==
He worked as the Special Assistant for Political Affairs to Nawaz Sharif in 2015.

He also served as the Minister of State For Political Affairs. He was elected to the Senate of Pakistan as a candidate of Pakistan Muslim League (N) (PML-N) in July 2017, replacing Babar Awan.

He was nominated by PML-N as its candidate in the 2018 Pakistani Senate election. However the Election Commission of Pakistan declared all PML-N candidates for the Senate election as independent after a ruling of the Supreme Court of Pakistan.

He was re-elected to the Senate as an independent candidate on general seat from Punjab in the Senate election He was backed in the election by PML-N and joined the treasury benches, led by PML-N after getting elected. He took oath as Senator on 12 March 2018.

On 20 July 2024, he left the PML(N), citing that people were "dying of [inflated] power bills and inflation" while party leaders were cheering on "ineffective governance".
