= Asad Ashraf =

Pakistani politician (born 1963)

- اسد اشرف

Member of the Senate of Pakistan
- Incumbent
- Assumed office 12 March 2018
- Constituency: General seat from Punjab

Member of the Provincial Assembly of Punjab
- In office 2008–2013
- Constituency: PP-138 (Lahore-II)
- In office 2002–2007
- Constituency: PP-138 (Lahore-II)

Personal details
- Born: 21 June 1963 (age 63) Lahore, Punjab, Pakistan
- Party: PMLN (1996-present)

Asad Ashraf (Urdu: اسد اشرف; born 21 June 1963) is a Pakistani politician who has been a member of the Senate of Pakistan, since March 2018. Previously he had been a Member of the Provincial Assembly of Punjab from 2002 to 2013.

== Early life and education ==
He was born on 21 June 1963 in Lahore.

He earned the degree of MBBS from Allama Iqbal Medical College in 1986 and did his PgDip in Cardiology from National Institute of Cardiovascular Diseases, Karachi in 1994.

== Political career ==
He joined Pakistan Muslim League (N) (PML-N) in 1996 after the assassination of his brother, Javed Ashraf who was a member of the PML-N.

He had been Advisor to the Chief Minister of Punjab Shehbaz Sharif from 1997 to 1999.

He was elected to the Provincial Assembly of Punjab as a candidate of PML-N from Constituency PP-138 (Lahore-II) in 2002 Pakistani general election. He received 10,651 votes and defeated a candidate of Pakistan Muslim League (Q) (PML-Q). During his tenure as Member of the Punjab Assembly, he remained deputy parliamentary leader of PML-N in the Punjab Assembly.

He was re-elected to the Provincial Assembly of Punjab as a candidate of PML-N from Constituency PP-138 (Lahore-II) in 2008 Pakistani general election. He received 19,552 votes and defeated a candidate of Pakistan Peoples Party.

He ran for the seat of the Provincial Assembly of Punjab as an independent candidate Constituency PP-138 (Lahore-II) in 2013 Pakistani general election, but was unsuccessful. He received 12 votes and lost the seat to Ghazali Saleem Butt. In the same election, he ran for the seat of the National Assembly as an independent candidate from Constituency NA-118 (Lahore-I) but was unsuccessful. He received 16 votes and lost the seat to Muhammad Riaz Malik.

Ashraf was elected to the Senate of Pakistan from Punjab general seat as an independent candidate in by-election held on 1 March 2018. He received 298 votes against a candidate of Pakistan Tehreek-e-Insaf who secured 38 votes. Ashraf was backed by PML-N which initially nominated him, but he had to run in the polls independently after the Election Commission of Pakistan declared his nomination papers void following the disqualification of Nawaz Sharif by the Supreme Court of Pakistan. He took oath as Senator on 12 March 2018.
