= Haji Saifullah Khan Bangash =

Pakistani politician

- حاجی سیف اللہ خان بنگش

Member of the Senate of Pakistan
- In office March 2012 – 1 February 2018

Personal details
- Died: 1 February 2018
- Party: Pakistan Peoples Party

Haji Saifullah Khan Bangash (Urdu: حاجی سیف اللہ خان بنگش) was a Pakistani politician who had been a member of the Senate of Pakistan from March 2012 until his death in February 2018.

== Education ==
He graduated high school in Kohat in 1970.

== Political career ==
He was elected to the Senate of Pakistan as a candidate of Pakistan Peoples Party in the 2012 Pakistani Senate election.

He remained senator until his death on 1 February 2018.
