= Muhammad Javed Abbasi =

Pakistani politician

Member of the Senate of Pakistan
- In office March 2015 – March 2021

Personal details
- Born: 6 April 1967 (age 59)
- Party: AP (2024-present)
- Other political affiliations: PMLN (2008-2024)

Muhammad Javed Abbasi (Urdu: محمد جاوید عباسی) is a Pakistani politician who was a member of the Senate of Pakistan from 2015 to 2021, representing Pakistan Muslim League (N). Previously, he was a member of the Provincial Assembly of Khyber Pakhtunkhwa from 2008 to 2013.

== Early life and education ==
Abbasi was born on 6 April 1967 to a Dhund Abbasi family. He received his early education from Islamabad and later did LLM from England where he studied In the University of Sheffield. Then he came to back Pakistan in 1999 and practised law for 3 years until he joined politics in 2002 and became the District Nazim Abbottabad the same year.

== Political career ==
He was elected to the Senate of Pakistan as a candidate of Pakistan Muslim League (N) in the 2015 Pakistani Senate election.

Previously, he ran for the seat of the Provincial Assembly of Khyber Pakhtunkhwa in the 2008 Pakistani general election from Constituency PK-48 (Abbottabad-V) as a candidate of Pakistan Muslim League (N) and was successful. He received 22,416 votes and defeated a candidate of Jamiat Ulema-e-Islam

Then in 2013 Pakistan Muslim League (N) again awarded him the ticket for the 2013 Pakistan general election from Constituency PK-48 (Abbottabad-V) and he again went for the seat of Provincial Assembly of Khyber Pakhtunkhwa but was unsuccessful this time and lost the seat to a candidate of Pakistan Tehreek-e-Insaf by a little margin.

Then in 2015 he was awarded the ticket of the Senate of Pakistan by Pakistan Muslim League (N) from Khyber Pakhtunkhwa and he was successful.

In the Senate of Pakistan he became the Chairman of the Standing Committee on Law and Justice, and also passed important bills.

“The Compulsory teaching of Arabic Language Bill 2020” had been introduced by Abbasi as a private members bill in which Arabic Language will be taught from class I to V and grammar from VI to XII, the house passed the bill after everyone spoke in favour of the it except Raza Rabbani.

“The Criminal Laws (Amendment) Bill 2020” was also introduced by Abbasi in which whoever commits rape, molestation of any kind to any human corpse shall be punished with imprisonment of life not less than 14 years and a fine which may extend to one million but not less than one hundred thousand rupees.

Abbasi also holds the record of presenting the most private members bills (86) in one tenure in the History of Senate of Pakistan and National Assembly of Pakistan.
