= Haji Khan Afridi =

Pakistani politician

Senator of Pakistan
- In office March 2009 – March 2015
- Constituency: FATA

Personal details
- Party: Independent

Haji Khan Afridi is a Pakistani politician who served as a Senator from March 2009 to March 2015. He was an independent and represented the Federally Administered Tribal Areas (FATA) in the Senate of Pakistan.
