= Farhat Abbas (politician) =

Pakistani politician

Senator of Pakistan
- In office March 2009 – March 2015
- Constituency: KPK

Personal details
- Party: Pakistan Peoples Party Parliamentarians (PPPP)

Farhat Abbas is a Pakistani politician who served as a senator from March 2009 to March 2015 who is a member of the Pakistan People's Party Parliamentarian (PPPP) and represented the province of Khyber Pakhtunkhwa in the Senate of Pakistan.
