= Ahmed Hassan (politician) =

Senator . Mna Ahmed Hassan

Member of the Senate of Pakistan
- In office March 2012 – 2018

Personal details
- Party: Pakistan People's Party

Ahmed Hassan (Urdu: احمد حسن) is a Pakistani politician who has been a member of Senate of Pakistan since March 2012.

== Education ==
He has done Bachelor of Laws from Peshawar Law College, Peshawar in 1975.

== Political career ==
He was elected to the Senate of Pakistan as a candidate of Pakistan Peoples Party in the 2012 Pakistani Senate election.
