= Almas Parveen =

Pakistani politician

Senator of Pakistan
- In office March 2009 – March 2015
- Constituency: Sindh

Personal details
- Party: Pakistan Peoples Party Parliamentarians (PPPP)

Almas Parveen is a Pakistani politician who served as a Senator from March 2009 to March 2015. She is a member of the Pakistan Peoples Party Parliamentarians (PPPP) and represented the province of Sindh in the Senate of Pakistan.
