= Kamil Ali Agha =

Pakistani politician

Kamil Ali Agha کامل علی آغا

Chairperson- Senate Committee on Government Assurances
- In office March 2021 – June 2025

Chairperson- Senate Committee on Information, Broadcasting and National Heritage
- In office March 2012 – March 2018

Member of the Senate of Pakistan
- Incumbent
- Assumed office 12 March 2021
- Constituency: Punjab
- In office 12 March 2012 – 11 March 2018
- Constituency: Punjab

Personal details
- Born: Kamil Ali Agha
- Party: PTI (2025-present)
- Other political affiliations: PML(Q) (2012-2025)
- Education: B.A. LLB
- Occupation: Politician

Kamil Ali Agha (Urdu: کامل علی آغا) is a Pakistani Politician and Member of Senate of Pakistan, former Chairperson Senate Committee on Government Assurances, he previously served as Chairperson Senate Committee on Information, Broadcasting and National Heritage. from March 2012 to March 2018.

== Political career ==
He belongs to Punjab province of Pakistan, and was elected to the Senate of Pakistan in March 2012 to March 2018 on a general seat as PML-Q candidate. He is the chairperson of Chairperson- Senate Committee on Information, Broadcasting and National Heritage and member of senate committees of Railways, States and Frontier Regions, Industries and Production. He is the central secretary general of PML-Q and had held several important positions during his political career, He was an elected member of National Assembly of Pakistan in 1977, Councilor of Lahore in 1983 and again in 1990, Parliamentary Secretary for Foreign Affairs in 1999 and chairman of standing committee on communications and railways in 2004-2009.

== See also ==
- List of Senators of Pakistan
- List of committees of the Senate of Pakistan
