= Mukhtiar Ahmed Dhamrah =

Pakistani politician

Senator Mukhtiar Ahmed Dhamrah

Member of the Senate of Pakistan
- In office March 2012 – March 2018

Personal details
- Party: Pakistan Peoples Party

Mukhtiar Ahmed Dhamrah is a Pakistani politician who had been a member of Senate of Pakistan from March 2012 to March 2018. He is the current Information Secretary of Pakistan Peoples Party.

== Political career ==
He was elected to the Senate of Pakistan as a candidate of Pakistan Peoples Party in the 2012 Pakistani Senate election.
