= Kalsoom Perveen =

Pakistani politician (1945–2020)

Member of the Senate of Pakistan
- In office March 2003 – 21 December 2020

Personal details
- Born: 1945
- Died: 21 December 2020 (aged 74–75) Islamabad, Pakistan
- Party: Pakistan Muslim League (N)

Kalsoom Parveen (Urdu: کلثوم پروین; 1945 – December 2020) was a Pakistani politician who served as a member of the Senate from March 2003 until her death on 21 December 2020.

== Education ==
She did Bachelor of Education from the Balochistan University in 1994. She held the Master of Philosophy degree in history.

== Political career ==
She was elected to the Senate of Pakistan on a reserved seat for women as a candidate of Pakistan Muslim League (Q) (PML-Q) in the 2003 Senate election.

She ran for the seat of Senate in 2009 Pakistani Senate election as an independent candidate after she was not given ticket by PML (Q) and was successfully re-elected. She later joined Balochistan National Party Awami (BNPA).

In January 2015, she quit BNPA to join the Pakistan Muslim League (N) (PML-N) and also resigned from her seat in the Senate.

She was re-elected to the Senate of Pakistan on a reserved seat for women as a candidate of PML-N in the 2015 Pakistani Senate election. She also served as president of the Chess Federation of Pakistan.

== Death ==
Perveen died of COVID-19 during the COVID-19 pandemic in Pakistan in a hospital in Islamabad on 21 December 2020.
