= Mir Kabeer Ahmed Muhammad Shahi =

Pakistani politician

Member of the Senate of Pakistan
- Incumbent
- Assumed office March 2015

Personal details
- Party: National Party

Mir Kabeer Ahmed Muhammad Shahi (Balochi/Brahui: میر کبیر احمد محمد شاہی) is a Baloch tribal leader and politician known for his work in Nationalist politics who was a member of Senate of Pakistan, representing National Party.

== Early life ==
Mir Kabeer is from the city Mangochar and is a chieftain of the Muhammad Shahi tribe.

== Education ==
He has done Master of Public Administration (MPA) and L.L.B.

== Political career ==
He was elected to the Senate of Pakistan as a candidate of National Party in the 2015 Pakistani Senate election.
