= Adnan Khan (politician) =

Pakistani politician

Senator of Pakistan
- In office March 2009 – March 2015
- Constituency: KPK

Personal details
- Party: Pakistan Peoples Party Parliamentarians (PPPP)

Adnan Khan is a Pakistani politician who served as a Senator from March 2009 to March 2015. He is a member of the Pakistan Peoples Party Parliamentarians (PPPP) and represented the province of KPK in the Senate of Pakistan.
