= Malik Najmul Hassan =

Pakistani politician

Senator Malik Najmul Hassan

Member of the Senate of Pakistan
- Incumbent
- Assumed office March 2012

Malik Najmul Hassan (Urdu: ملک نجم الحسن) is a Pakistani politician who has been a member of Senate of Pakistan since March 2012.

== Political career ==
He was elected to the Senate of Pakistan as an independent candidate in the 2012 Pakistani Senate election.
