= Shahi Sayed =

Senator Shahi Syed
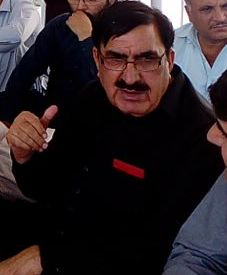
- Shahi Sayed

Member of the Senate of Pakistan
- In office March 2012 – March 2018

Personal details
- Other political affiliations: ANP (2001- Present)

Shahi Sayed or Shahi Syed (Urdu: شاہی سيد) is a Pakistani politician who has been the Senator and the President of Awami National Party Sindh chapter, Pakistan. He is also the chairman of the Pakhtun Action Committee or Pakhtun Loya Jirga of Karachi

Sayed is originally from Babozai Village in the district of Mardan, Khyber Pakhtunkhwa province. Shahi Sayed owned CNG gas stations in Karachi before becoming involved in politics.

Sayed came to Karachi in 1971 to attain education and eventually landed a job at a private company. From there, he started a small transport business and within a decade, he morphed into a well-established businessman. He joined the ANP on 15 April 2001. Within two years he was elected the president of the party's Sindh chapter. Since then, he has been reelected to the post three times. Last year Syed was elected as an ANP senator.

== See also ==
- Pakhtun Action Committee
- Pakhtun Loya Jirga
- Awami National Party
