= Nuzhat Sadiq =

Pakistani politician

Senator Nuzhat Sadiq
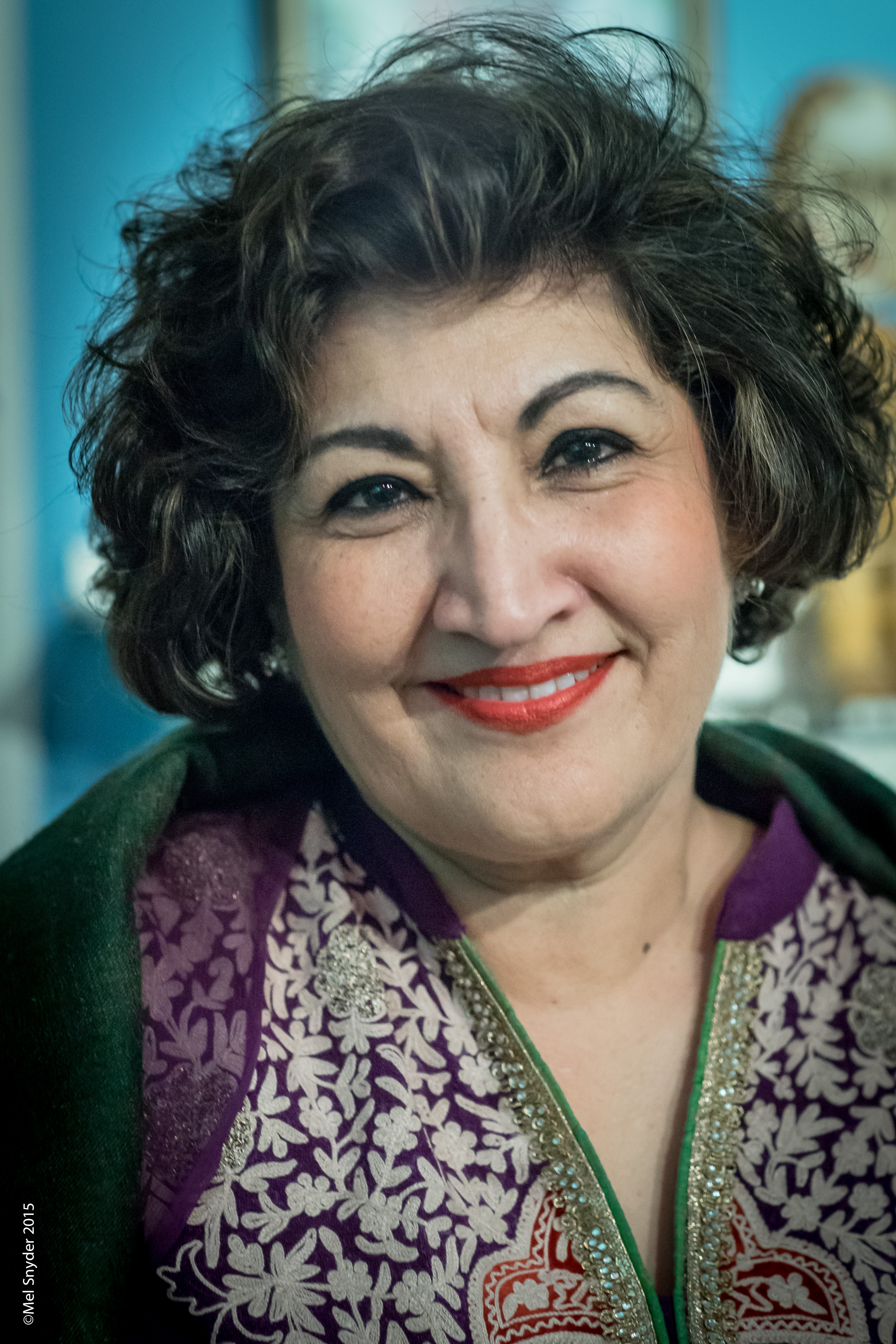

Pakistan Senator from Punjab
- Incumbent
- Assumed office 12 March 2012
- Constituency: Reserved seat for women

Member of the National Assembly of Pakistan
- In office 17 March 2008 – 11 March 2012
- Constituency: Reserved seat for women

Personal details
- Party: PMLN (2018-present

Nuzhat Amir Sadiq (Urdu: نزہت عامر صادق) is a Pakistani politician who has been a Member of the Senate of Pakistan, since March 2012. Previously, she has been a Member of the National Assembly of Pakistan from 2008 to 2012.

== Education ==
Sadiq received a Bachelor of the Arts degree from Cantonment College for Women in Peshawar in 1975.

== Political career ==
Sadiq was elected to the National Assembly of Pakistan as a candidate of Pakistan Muslim League (N) (PML-N) on reserved seat for women in the 2008 Pakistani general election. She remained the richest woman Member of the National Assembly from 2007 to 2009.

She was elected to the Senate of Pakistan as a candidate of PML-N on a reserved seat for women in the 2012 Pakistani Senate election.

She resigned from her National Assembly seat on 11 March 2012.

She was nominated by PML-N as its candidate in the 2018 Pakistani Senate election. However the Election Commission of Pakistan declared all PML-N candidates for the Senate election as independent after a ruling of the Supreme Court of Pakistan.

She was re-elected to the Senate as an independent candidate on a reserved seat for women from Punjab in the 2018 Senate election. She joined the treasury benches, led by PML-N after getting elected.
