= Mir Muhammad Yousaf Badini =

Pakistani politician

Member of the Senate of Pakistan
- In office March 2015 – March 2021

Personal details
- Born: Noshki, Balochistan
- Party: Pakistan People's Party
- Relatives: Usman Badini (brother)

Mir Muhammad Yousaf Badini (Urdu: میر محمد یوسف بادینی) is a Pakistani politician who was a member of Senate of Pakistan from 2015 to 2021. He served as the Chairman of Senate Standing Committee on Privatisation, Functional Committee on less developed area. He was born in Noshki, Balochistan.

== Education ==
He received BA degree from Balochistan University.

== Political career ==
He was elected to Senate of Pakistan in 2013. He was re-elected to the Senate of Pakistan as an independent candidate in the 2015 Pakistani Senate election.
