= Ghous Muhammad Khan Niazi =

Pakistani politician

Senator Ghous Muhammad Khan Niazi

Member of the Senate of Pakistan
- Incumbent
- Assumed office March 2015

Personal details
- Party: Pakistan Muslim League (N)

Ghous Muhammad Khan Niazi (Urdu: غوث محمد خان نیازی) is a Pakistani politician who has been a member of Senate of Pakistan since March 2015.

== Education ==
He holds a degree of Bachelor of Medicine and Bachelor of Surgery (M.B.B.S) which he received from the University of Punjab in 1986.

== Political career ==
He was elected to the Senate of Pakistan as a candidate of Pakistan Muslim League (N) in the 2015 Pakistani Senate election.
