= Jehanzeb Jamaldini =

Politician in Pakistan

Senator Dr. Jehanzeb Jamaldini
- ڈاکٹر جہانزیب جمالدینی

Member of Senate of Pakistan
- In office March 2015 – March 2021

Chairperson of Committee on Rules of Procedure and Privileges
- In office March 2015 – 2017
- President: Mamnoon Hussain
- Prime Minister: Nawaz Sharif

Personal details
- Party: Balochistan National Party (BNP-M)

Jehanzeb Jamaldini is a Pakistani politician and a former member of Senate of Pakistan, affiliated with Balochistan National Party (BNP-M). Dr. Jehanzeb got his MBBS degree from Dow Medical College in 1978. He is Central Secretary General of Balochistan National Party (Mengal). He was elected from Balochistan on General Seat of Senate of Pakistan. His tenure is from March 2015 to March 2021.

== Political career ==
He was the chairperson of Committee on Committee on Rules of Procedure and Privileges. He was also member of following standing committees.

- The Drafting Committee of the Committee of the Whole
- Business Advisory Committee
- The Performance of PIA
- Bipartisan Special Oversight Committee
- Ethics
- Interior and Narcotics Control
- Human Rights
- Problem of Less Developed Areas
- The Project of China-Pak Economic Corridor

== Personal life ==
His son Sangat Jamaldini died on 8 August 2016 in a blast in Civil Hospital Quetta.
