= Sitara Ayaz =

Pakistani politician

- ستارہ ایاز

Member of the Senate of Pakistan
- In office 12 March 2015 – 16 February 2021
- Constituency: Khyber Pakhtunkhwa

Personal details
- Party: Independent

Senator Sitara Ayaz (Urdu: ستارہ ایاز) is a Pakistani politician and was member of Senate of Pakistan from 2015 -2021.

She is currently serving as the Secretary General of International Parliamentarians Congress.

== Education ==
She has done BA from Jinnah College For Women in 1990.

== Political career ==
She was elected to the Senate of Pakistan as a candidate of Awami National Party on reserved seat for women in the 2015 Pakistani Senate election. Native Town: District SWABI, Khyber Pakhtunkhwa Positions held: worked as Consultant (Development Sector) Head of APWA (KPK) from 2003 to 2008 Provincial Minister of KPK for Social Welfare and Women Empowerment 2008-2013 Chairperson of the Senate Standing Committee on Climate Change.

In 2021 she withdrew her nomination to become Senator again.
