= Rubina Khalid (politician) =

Pakistani politician

Senator Rubina Khalid

Member of the Senate of Pakistan
- Incumbent
- Assumed office March 2012

Personal details
- Party: PPP (2012-present)

Rubina Khalid (Urdu: روبینہ خالد) is a Pakistani politician who has been a Member of the Senate of Pakistan, since March 2012. She is currently the chairperson of the Senate Committee on Information Technology & Telecommunications. She is chairperson of the Benazir Income Support Programme since 9 May 2024.

== Education ==
She has done Bachelor of Laws from Khyber Law College, Peshawar.

== Political career ==
She was elected to the Senate of Pakistan as a candidate of Pakistan People's Party (PPP) from Khyber Pakhtunkhwa in the 2012 Pakistani Senate election.

She was re-elected to the Senate as a candidate of PPP on reserved seat for women from Khyber Pakhtunkhwa in the 2018 Pakistani Senate election. She took oath as Senator on 12 March 2018.
