= Sajjad Hussain Turi =

Pakistani politician

Member of the Senate of Pakistan
- In office March 2015 – March 2021

Sajjad Hussain Turi (Urdu: سجاد حسین طوری) is a Pakistani politician who was a member of Senate of Pakistan.

== Political career ==
He was elected to the Senate of Pakistan as an independent candidate in 2015 Pakistani Senate election.
