= Abdul Qayyum (general) =

- Born: Chakwal District, Punjab, Pakistan
- Military career
- Allegiance: Pakistan
- Branch: Pakistan Army
- Service years: 1968 – 2004
- Rank: Lieutenant-General
- Nickname: General Qayyum
- Unit: Pakistan Army Regiment of Artillery
- Commands: Infantry Brigade and Army Artillery Division
- Conflicts: Indo-Pakistani War of 1971
- Awards: Hilal-i-Imtiaz (military)
- Other work: Former Chairman of Pakistan Ordnance Factories (POF); Chairman of Pakistan Steel Mills

Abdul Qayyum (Urdu: عبدالقیوم) is a retired three-star general of the Pakistan Army who has been the chairman of the Pakistan Ordnance Factories and chairman of board of Pakistan Steel Mills.

== Early life ==
Abdul Qayyum, Hilal-i-Imtiaz (Military), is a retired lieutenant general of the Pakistan army. He hails from the rural areas of Chakwal District of Punjab province of Pakistan.

== Career ==
He entered the Pakistan Military Academy, Kakul, in May 1966 as a cadet and was commissioned in the Pakistan Army in April 1968 and retired as a three-star general in January 2004. He remained the chairman of the Pakistan Ordnance Factories from September 1998 to January 2004.

== Retirement ==
After his retirement, he became chairman of the board of Pakistan Steel Mills in 2004 and remained there until September 2006. He resigned from there under protest against a privatization attempt of Pakistan's largest integrated steel plant which was later cancelled by the Supreme Court of Pakistan. General Qayyum is also the president of Nazria Pakistan forum Islamabad chapter which was being run under the patronage of renowned journalist late Majid Nizami. He contributed a column to daily Nawa-i-Waqt every Friday under the title Fikr-o-Khayal for about 7 years from 2007 to 2014. He appears frequently in television talk shows as a politico-defense analyst.

The retired general joined politics in April 2012 and is now part of the ruling Pakistan Muslim League (N). He has also been a member of the senate of Pakistan since March 2015. He has been chairman of Senate standing committee on Defence production for the last four years and is also member of senate Defence, Kashmir, Antinarcotics and Statistics. As a politico-Defence analyst Senator Lt General Qayyum is known for his balanced and objective inputs in both cold and print media on important national and international issues. The Senator was also sent to Britain in 2016 as a special envoy of the former Prime Minister Nawaz Sharif on Kashmir where he effectively highlighted the details of human right violations and blatant atrocities being committed by a seven-hundred-thousand-strong Indian Army to suppress the voice of unarmed Kashmiris demanding their right of self determination as promised by the United Nation. The general is a keen golfer with 14 handicap.

== Bibliography ==
Qayyum is an author of four books:

- Islam in Perspective
- Fikr-o-khayal Parts 1 & 2
- Pakistan Kay androoni Masail
- Pakistan Aalmi Tanazur Main
