= Hilal-ur-Rehman =

Pakistani politician

Senator Hilal-ur-Rehman

Member of the Senate of Pakistan
- Incumbent
- Assumed office March 2012

Hilal-ur-Rehman (Urdu: ہلال الرحمان) is a Pakistani politician who has been a member of Senate of Pakistan since March 2012.

== Political career ==
He was elected to the Senate of Pakistan as an independent candidate in the 2012 Pakistani Senate election.

He was re-elected to the Senate as an independent candidate on general seat from FATA in the 2018 Pakistani Senate election.
