= Nisar Muhammad =

Pakistani politician

Senator Nisar Muhammad

Member of the Senate of Pakistan
- Incumbent
- Assumed office March 2012

Personal details
- Other political affiliations: Pakistan Muslim League (N)

Nisar Muhammad (Urdu: نثار محمد) is a Pakistani politician who has been a member of Senate of Pakistan since March 2012.

== Education ==
He holds a Master of Arts degree from the University of Peshawar, awarded in 1988.

== Political career ==
He was elected to the Senate of Pakistan as a candidate of Pakistan Muslim League (N) in the 2012 Pakistani Senate election.
