= Israr Ullah Zehri =

Pakistani politician (born 1965)

Israr Ullah Khan Zehri (Urdu: مير اسراراللہ زہری; born 15 December 1965) is a Pakistani politician. He is currently a senator from Balochistan. He also serves as Federal Minister for Postal Services. He hails from Jhalawan, Balochistan and was the former president of the Balochistan National Party Awami. He was elected to the Senate of Pakistan in March 2006 and then again in 2012.

== Political career ==
Israr Ullah Khan Zehri became a Senator in March 2006. He started parliamentary politics in 1990 and served as Provincial minister for Agriculture, local government, Home and Health minister from 1990 to 1999.

== Support for Baba Kot incident ==
Zehri is a tribal leader and attracted condemnation both inside and outside Pakistan for openly supporting the traditional tribal practice of 'honor killing'. In August 2008, the Asian Human Rights Commission reported that five women (including three teenagers) in a remote village in Balochistan had been beaten, shot and buried alive in a ditch for the 'crime' of having wished to choose their own husbands. After human rights activists brought the case to national and international attention, Zehri defended the killings in Parliament and asked his fellow legislators not to make a fuss about the incident. He said, "These are centuries-old traditions, and I will continue to defend them. Only those who indulge in immoral acts should be afraid."
