= Sardar Fateh Muhammad Muhammad Hassani =

Senator Sardar Fateh Muhammad Muhammad Hassani

Member of the Senate of Pakistan
- In office March 2012 – March 2018

Personal details
- Born: 13 August 1946 (age 79)
- Other political affiliations: Pakistan Muslim League (N)

Sardar Fateh Muhammad Muhammad Hassani (Urdu: سردار فتح محمد محمد حسنی; born 13 August 1946) is a Pakistani politician and was member of Senate of Pakistan. He served as Chairperson-Senate Committee on Ports and Shipping.

== Political career ==
He belongs to Baluchistan province of Pakistan, and was elected to the Senate of Pakistan in March 2012 on a general seat as Pakistan Peoples Party candidate. He is the chairperson of Senate Committee on Ports and Shipping and member of senate committees of Interior and Narcotics Control, Finance, Revenue, Economic Affairs, Statistics and Privatization and Industries and Production. Sardar Fateh Muhammad Hasni head of Hasni tribe in baluchistan pakistan

== See also ==
- List of Senators of Pakistan
- List of committees of the Senate of Pakistan
