= Baz Muhammad Khan =

Pakistani Senator

Senator Baz Muhammad Khan باز محمد خان
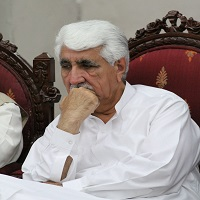

Chairperson of Senate Committee on Kashmir Affairs & Gilgit Baltistan
- In office 2012–2018
- President: Mamnoon Hussain
- Prime Minister: Nawaz Sharif

Chairperson of Senate Committee of Human Resources Development & Overseas Pakistanis
- Incumbent
- Assumed office 2012

Pakistani Senator from Khyber Pakhtunkhwa
- Incumbent
- Assumed office March 2012

Personal details
- Born: Baz Muhammad Khan
- Party: Awami National Party
- Children: 7
- Occupation: Politician

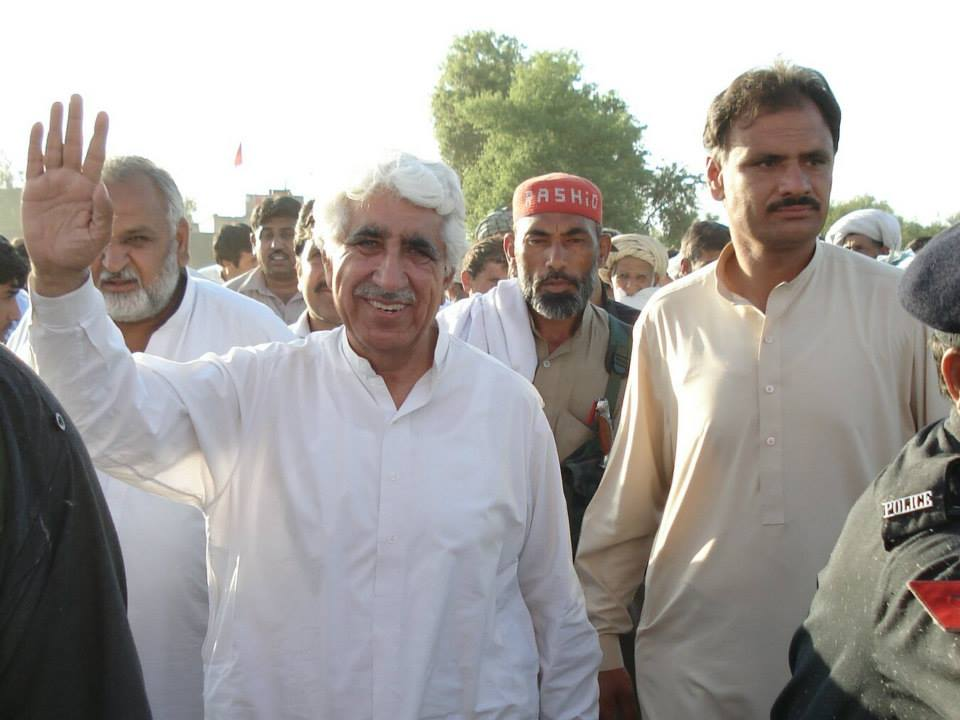
Baz Muhammad Khan at a Jalsa, 1st May, 2013

Baz Muhammad Khan (Urdu: باز محمد خان) is a Pakistani politician and member of Senate of Pakistan, currently serving as Chairperson of the Senate Committee on Kashmir Affairs & Gilgit Baltistan. Additionally, Baz Muhammad Khan has been elected Chairman of Overseas Pakistanis Affairs.

== Political career ==
He belongs to Bannu Khyber Pakhtunkhwa province of Pakistan, and was elected to the Senate of Pakistan in March 2012 on a general seat as Awami National Party candidate. He is the chairperson of Senate Committee on Kashmir Affairs & Gilgit Baltistan and Human Resources Development & Overseas Pakistanis. He is a member of senate committees of Cabinet Secretariat, Functional Committee on Government Assurances, Religious Affairs and Interfaith Harmony. He is the senior vice president of ANP Khyber Pakhtunkhwa since 2006 and is currently the Central Vice President of ANP. He has been previously elected to Khyber Pakhtunkhwa Assembly in 1988,1990, 1993, 1997 and again in 2002 where he served as provincial minister for health, provincial minister for forest and later provincial minister for irrigation. In 2008, Asfandyar Wali Khan had declared Baz Muhammad Khan as his party’s candidate for the Chief Minister’s slot, but Baz Muhammad Khan lost his seat. In 2013 his son Taimoor Baz Khan also contested elections from PK-71 and was declared the winner, but he lost his seat in repolling ordered by Chief Justice Dost Mohammad Khan who had issues with ANP in the past.

== See also ==
- List of Senators of Pakistan
- List of committees of the Senate of Pakistan
