= Hidayat Ullah =

Pakistani politician (died 2024)

Senator Hidayat Ullah
- ہدایت اللہ

Member of the Senate of Pakistan
- In office March 2012 – March 2024

Personal details
- Died: 3 July 2024 Damadola, Khyber Pakhtunkhwa, Pakistan
- Party: PTI (2018–2024); PPP (2012–2018)

Hidayat Ullah (Urdu: ہدایت اللہ; died 3 July 2024) was a Pakistani politician who was a member of Senate of Pakistan from March 2012 to March 2024.

== Political career ==
He was elected to the Senate of Pakistan as an independent candidate on a general seat from the Federally Administered Tribal Areas (FATA) in the 2012 Pakistani Senate election.

He was re-elected to the Senate as an independent candidate on a general seat from FATA in the 2018 Pakistani Senate election.

He joined the Pakistan Tehreek-e-Insaf (PTI) on 27 August 2018.

== Assassination ==
Ullah was killed along with four others in a remote-controlled bombing on his vehicle in Bajaur on 3 July 2024 while he was on his way to attend a campaign rally for a by-election in Damadola.
