= Muzaffar Hussain Shah =

Pakistani politician (1968-2020)

Senator Muzaffar Hussain Shah
- In office March 2018 – March 2024
- Incumbent: Member of the Senate of Pakistan

Personal details
- Born: 1945 (age 80–81) Karachi, Sindh, British India
- Other political affiliations: Pakistan Muslim League Functional (PMLF)

Syed Muzaffar Hussain Shah (Urdu: مظفر حسین شاہ) is a Pakistani politician and a member of Senate of Pakistan. He was born in 1945. He is an active partisan of Pakistan Muslim League (F). He was nominated by the President to chair the session to administer the oath of newly elected senators and preside over the election for chairman of Senate 2021.

== Positions ==
- Senior Vice President, Pakistan Muslim League (Functional) (1980)
- Member Majlis Shoora (1980-1982)
- Minister for Industries Govt of Sindh (1983-1984)
- Speaker Provincial Assembly Sindh (1986-1988)
- Minister Law, Parliamentary Affairs, Agriculture Land Utilization, Minister Coordination, Govt of Sindh (1990-1992)
- Chief Minister Sindh (1992-1993)
- Speaker Provincial Assembly Sindh (2002-2008)
- Member Parliament (Senator: 2012 to 2018)
- Member Parliament (Senator: 2018 to 2024)

== See also ==
- A K Brohi

Political offices
Preceded by Jam Sadiq Ali	Chief Minister of Sindh; 1992 – 1993	Succeeded by Syed Ali Madad Shah
