= Tahir Hussain Mashhadi =

Senator and politician of Pakistan

Syed Tahir Hussain Mashhadi

Pakistani Senate of Pakistan from Sindh
- In office March 2012 – July 2022
- President: Mamnoon Hussain
- Prime Minister: Nawaz Sharif

Personal details
- Born: 26 July 1942 Jehanian, Punjab, British India
- Died: 9 July 2022 (aged 79) Karachi, Sindh, Pakistan
- Party: MQM (2012-2022)
- Occupation: Soldier, politician

Military service
- Battles/wars: Indo-Pakistani War of 1971

Syed Tahir Hussain Mashhadi (Urdu: سید طاہر حسین مشہدی; 26 July 1942 – 9 July 2022) was a Pakistani soldier and a politician (a member of the Senate of Pakistan from 2003 to 2006).

== Military career ==
Tahir Mashhadi joined the Pakistan Army in 1970 during the war with India and was commissioned as a second lieutenant in 1971, graduating from the Pakistan Military Academy.

During the Indo-Pakistani War of 1971, Mashhadi was stationed in then East Pakistan, which saw some heavy air attacks. At the end of war, Mashhadi was taken as a prisoner of war and repatriated in 1974.

He was a member of the Pakistan Peoples Party and a former senator of the Muttahida Qaumi Movement.

== Death ==
Tahir Hussain Mashhadi died on 9 July 2022.
