= Abdul Haseeb Khan =

Pakistani politician

Senator Abdul Haseeb Khan
- Incumbent
- Assumed office March 2009
- President: Mamnoon Hussain
- Prime Minister: Nawaz Sharif

Personal details
- Born: Abdul Haseeb Khan
- Party: MQM
- Education: Diploma of Associate Engineering (Electrical Technology)
- Occupation: Politician

Abdul Haseeb Khan (Urdu: عبدل حسیب خان) is a Pakistani politician and member of the Senate of Pakistan.

== Political career ==
In March 2009 he was elected to the Senate of Pakistan on general seat as MQM candidate. He is member of Senate committee of National Health Services, Regulations and Coordination, Information Technology and Telecommunication Commerce and Textile Industry, Industries and Production and Employees Welfare Fund.

== See also ==
- List of Senators of Pakistan
- Ayatullah Durrani
- Hafiz Hamdullah
