= Hafiz Hamdullah =

Pakistani politician

Hamdullah Saboor

Chairperson- Senate Committee of Religious Affairs and Interfaith Harmony
- Incumbent
- Assumed office 12 March 2012

Member of the Senate of Pakistan
- In office 12 March 2012 – March 2018

Provincial Health Minister of Balochistan
- In office 2002–2005

Member of the Provincial Assembly of Balochistan
- In office 2002–2007

Spokesperson PDM
- In office September 2020 – September 2023

Personal details
- Born: Chaman, Balochistan, Pakistan
- Party: JUI (F) (2012-present)
- Education: Master's in Political Science; Dars-i Nizami
- Alma mater: University of Balochistan; Darul Uloom Karachi
- Occupation: Politician

Hafiz Hamdullah Saboor (Urdu:حافظ حمد اللہ صبور) is a Pakistani Islamic scholar and politician who previously served as the member of Senate of Pakistan, and the provincial health minister of Balochistan.

== Early life and education ==
His father Qari Wali Muhammad worked as a teacher in the education department of Balochistan.

He obtained his Master's degree in political science from the University of Balochistan while in terms of religious education he passed his Dars-i Nizami courses from the Darul Uloom Karachi, an institution affiliated with the Wifaq ul Madaris Al-Arabia, the largest federation of Deobandi seminaries in Pakistan.

His son is serving as an officer in the Pakistan Army.

== Political career ==
He was elected MPA of Balochistan Assembly in the 2002 General Elections on Muttahida Majlis-e-Amal ticket, and served as Provisional Health Minister from 2002 till 2005.

In March 2012, he was elected to the Senate of Pakistan on general seat as Jamiat Ulema-e-Islam (F) candidate.

He is the chairperson of senate committee on Religious Affairs and Interfaith Harmony, and member of functional committee on Government Assurances, Information Technology and Telecommunication and committee on Ports and Shipping.

== Assassination attempts ==
=== 2023 attempt ===
On 14 September 2023, Hamdullah was injured in a blast in Mastung district while travelling from Quetta to Kalat.

=== 2024 attempt ===
On 7 February 2024, unknown gunmen opened fire on Hamdullah's vehicle in Chaman. The gunfire lasted around five minutes. Hamdullah was unharmed by the attack, and the attackers fled following retaliatory firing by his guards. The attack occurred after two bombings in Balochistan province which killed at least 26 people.

== See also ==
- List of Deobandis
- List of people who survived assassination attempts
