= Raza Rabbani =

Pakistani politician and lawyer (born 1953)

- رضا ربانی
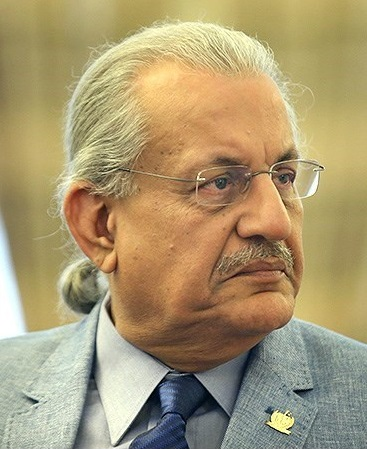
- Rabbani in 2017

7th Chairman of the Senate
- In office 12 March 2015 – 11 March 2018
- President: Mamnoon Hussain
- Preceded by: Nayyar Hussain Bukhari
- Succeeded by: Sadiq Sanjrani

Minister of Inter Provincial Coordination
- In office 3 November 2008 – 13 March 2009
- Prime Minister: Yousaf Raza Gillani
- Preceded by: Chaudhary Nisar Ali Khan
- Succeeded by: Aftab Hussain Shah Jillani

Minister of State for Law and Justice
- In office 19 October 1993 – 5 November 1996
- Prime Minister: Benazir Bhutto
- Preceded by: Saima Akhtar Bharwana
- Succeeded by: Tehmina Daultana

Advisor to the Chief Minister of Sindh on Cooperative
- In office 1988 – 25 February 1990
- Chief Minister: Syed Qaim Ali Shah

Personal details
- Born: 23 July 1953 (age 73) Lahore, Punjab, Pakistan
- Party: PPP (1968-present)
- Education: University of Karachi
- Awards: Nishan-e-Imtiaz

Mian Raza Rabbani (Punjabi, Urdu: رضا ربانى; born 23 July 1953) is a Pakistani politician and lawyer who served as the 7th Chairman of the Senate of Pakistan from March 2015 to March 2018. He has been affiliated with the Pakistan Peoples Party since 1968.

He has been elected a Senator six times since 1993 from Sindh. He was a close aide to Benazir Bhutto who had appointed him the party's deputy secretary general in 1997 and leader of the opposition in the Senate in 2005. Rabbani has served as Minister of Inter Provincial Coordination, Minister of State for Law and Justice, and Leader of the House and Opposition in the Senate. Raza Rabbani was unanimously elected as the Chairman of the Senate of Pakistan in March 2015 and he served until March 2018, when he was succeeded by Sadiq Sanjrani.

== Early life and education ==
Rabbani was born on 23 July 1953 in Lahore, Punjab into a well educated Punjabi Arain family. His father Mian Atta Rabbani an officer in Royal Indian Air Force during the British Raj and first commissioned pilot in Pakistan Air Force, after independence. He served as Muhammad Ali Jinnah's Aide-de-Camp. He spent his childhood in Karachi.

Rabbani received his early education from Habib Public School in Karachi. He received his BA and LLB. (Bachelor of Law) degrees from the University of Karachi in 1976 and 1981, respectively.

Rabbani was politically active during his university years at the University of Karachi and was head of Liberal Students Federation in 1974. He is said to have affiliated with Pakistan Peoples Party (PPP) since 1968. He was in jail during the rule of Zia u Haq. He received his LLB degree in 1981.

He started practising law after the completion of his studies.

== Political career ==
Rabbani started his political career through PPP in the 1981.

He served as an Advisor, Chief Minister of Sindh, for Co-operative from 1988 to 1990.

He was elected to the Senate of Pakistan for the first time in 1993 where he served until 1999.

He was inducted into the federal cabinet in 1994 and appointed as the Minister of State for Law and Justice during the second government of Benazir Bhutto where he served until 1996.

In 1996, he became the Deputy Leader of the Opposition in the Senate. In 1997, he was appointed as the deputy secretary general of PPP by Benazir Bhutto.

He was re-elected to the Senate in 2003 for three years.

He was re-elected to the Senate in 2006 for six-year term.

He remained Leader of the Opposition in the Senate from 2005 to 2008. After the victory of PPP in 2008 Pakistani general elections, he refused to join the federal cabinet of Yousaf Raza Gillani due to reluctance to take oath from then president of Pakistan Pervez Musharraf.

He served as the Leader of the House in the Senate from 2008 to 2009.

After resignation of then President Pervez Musharraf, On 3 November 2008, Rabbani was inducted into the federal cabinet with the rank of federal minister and appointed as Advisor to the Prime Minister on Inter-Provincial Coordination where he served until 9 March 2009 when he resigned against the decision of PPP to nominate Farooq Naek as chairman of the Senate.

In 2011, he was again inducted into the federal cabinet with the rank of federal minister and appointed as the Federal Minister for Inter-Provincial Coordination and Human Rights where he briefly served from February 2011 until his resignation in May 2011.

Later he went on to serve as the chairman of the parliamentary committee for constitutional reform and chairman of the Parliamentary Committee on National Security.

He was re-elected to the Senate in 2012 for six-year term.

After the PPP lost the 2013 general election, he was made additional secretary general of PPP by Zardari.

In July 2013, he was nominated as PPP candidate for presidential office.

PPP later announced to boycott the presidential elections citing the decision of Supreme Court.

Rabbani has been awarded Nishan-e-Imtiaz for his parliamentary services.

=== Inter Parliamentary Union ===
Rabbani was elected as an executive member in Inter Parliamentary Union in October 2019 as candidature of Indian National Congress leader Shashi Tharoor was withdrawn by BJP led Indian Government.

=== Views on national security ===
Despite his disagreements with PPP's leadership, Senator Rabbani was named by the President to be the Chairperson of the Parliamentary Committee on National Security and the Chairperson of the Parliamentary Committee on Constitutional Reform in 2008.

His services and credentials led to his simultaneous appointment to the chairmanship of the Beginning of the Rights of Balochistan where he worked on presenting a package to redress the problems of the Balochistan Province to the joint sessions of the Parliament. Despite his recommendations, none of the provisions in the packages would be carried out by Prime Minister Yousaf Raza Gillani who would later entangle with the Supreme Court over the missing persons scandal. In 2003, Rabbani demonstrated his opposition against the Iraq war in 2003, over the issue of its nuclear program.

About the atomic proliferation issues, Rabbani criticised the President Pervez Musharraf in the news channels and publicly supported the case of Dr. AQ Khan against President Musharraf. While calling for moral responsibility of nuclear weapons and security, he reportedly marked his words over this issue as the "propaganda against Pakistan in the Western Media about terrorism and nuclear weapons, raising legitimate apprehensions in the minds of Pakistanis."

During the height of the United States-Pakistan border confrontations, Rabbani declared to the media about the shift-changing policy of Pakistan as United States' ally and quoted: "We need to prioritize our own national-security interests. As far as the U.S. is concerned, the message that has gone with this resolution will definitely ring alarm bells, vis-à-vis their policy of bulldozing Pakistan."

In April 2011, Rabbani also heavily criticised the US over their drone operations in North-Western Pakistan in the Parliament, commenting that United States is following a major violation of international law and human rights.

== Political philosophy ==
Rabbani has written in support of socialism, communism, constitutional justice, and left-wing ideas. In 2003, he authored a book, "LFO: a fraud on the Constitution", in a direct opposition to President Pervez Musharraf and a scheme of legitimising his rule.

In response to insurgency situation in the country, Rabbani reputedly declared that "Politico-religious parties and right-wing political groups are conniving with the establishment to damage and weaken left-wing parties." His statement came during the 2013 general elections, in which, left-wing parties were under immense pressure from the right-wing insurgent groups to limit their political campaigns. Rabbani later accused the international community for supporting the conservative parties in an opposition against the leftist parties. While accusing former president Pervez Musharraf for supporting the ultra-conservative alliance to curb the left-wing parties, Rabbani, with another Marxist Taj Haider, accused the West and the United States of supporting right wing parties for their bid in the elections.

== Writings ==
He is the author of the following books:

- Rabbani, Mian Raza. A biography of Pakistani federalism : unity in diversity. Islamabad: Leo Books. ISBN 9693705505.
- Rabbani, Mian Raza (2003). LFO : a fraud on the Constitution. Q.A. Publishers. p. 241.
- Mian Raza Rabbani; Fouzia Saeed; Maliha Hussain (2012). Raza Rabbani : a national hero. Islamabad: Mehergarh Research and Publications. ISBN 978-9699659089.
- Rabbani, Mian Raza (2017). Invisible People. Lahore: Sang-e-meel Publications. ISBN 978-9693530001.

Political offices
| Preceded by Nayyar Hussain Bukhari | Chairman of the Senate of Pakistan; 2015-2018 | Succeeded by Sadiq Sanjrani; Incumbent |
