= Ayatullah Durrani =

Pakistani politician (1956–2020)

- آیت اللہ درانی

Minister of Industries and Production
- In office March 2008 – Feb 2011
- President: Asif Ali Zardari
- Prime Minister: Yousaf Raza Gillani
- Constituency: (NA-268) Kalat-cum-Mastung

Personal details
- Born: 1 January 1956 Mastung, Balochistan, Pakistan
- Died: 5 July 2020 (aged 64) Quetta, Balochistan, Pakistan
- Cause of death: COVID-19
- Party: Pakistan Peoples Party
- Parent: Mualana Muhammed Umar (father)
- Education: PhD Physics
- Occupation: Politician

Ayatullah Durrani (1 January 1956 – 5 July 2020) was a Pakistani politician who served as Member of National Assembly of Pakistan and Minister of State for Industries and Production.

== Early life and education ==
Durrani was born in Pringabad, Mastung District, Balochistan. He was a native speaker of Farsi language and was able to speak English Urdu Pashto Brahvi and Balochi language as well.

He had a PhD Degree in Physics, and has served in various positions as President Peoples Students Federation, Kalat Division (1974–1976), President Peoples Students Federation Balochistan (1977–1984), Hon. Lecturer (Physics Dept) University of Baluchistan (1981–1988), Hon. Principal Scientific Adviser University of Baluchistan (1981–1988), Officer In-charge, Pakistan Scientific & Technology Information Center (PASTIC), President Peoples Youth Organization Baluchistan (1985–1989), Adviser To The Prime Minister Benazir Bhutto (Balochistan Affairs) (1989–1990), General Secretary, Peoples Democratic Alliance, Baluchistan (1992–1993), Member Islamic Ideology Council, Islamabad (1993–1996), Chairman Bait-ul-Mall Balochistan (1993–1996), Joint Secretary Pakistan Hockey Federation (1993–1996), President Baseball Association, Balochistan (1999–2002).

== Career ==
He ran for the Parliament of Pakistan in the General elections of 2008 from (NA-268) Kalat-cum-Mastung on Pakistan Peoples Party ticket. He won the elections and was sworn in as Minister of state for Industries and Production. He lost his seat in 2013 General elections.

In September 2010, he asked President Barack Obama to offer Eid prayers at Ground Zero Mosque to become Ameer-ul-Momineen of Muslim Ummah.

== Death ==
Ayatullah Durrani died on 5 July 2020, from COVID-19 during the COVID-19 pandemic in Pakistan at Fatima Jinnah General and Chest Hospital in Quetta. Five days before his death, he tested positive for Coronavirus and was on ventilator.
