= 2021 Pakistani Senate election =

Selection of senators by lawmakers

- 3 March 2021

48 of the 100 seats in the Senate of Pakistan 51 seats needed for a majority
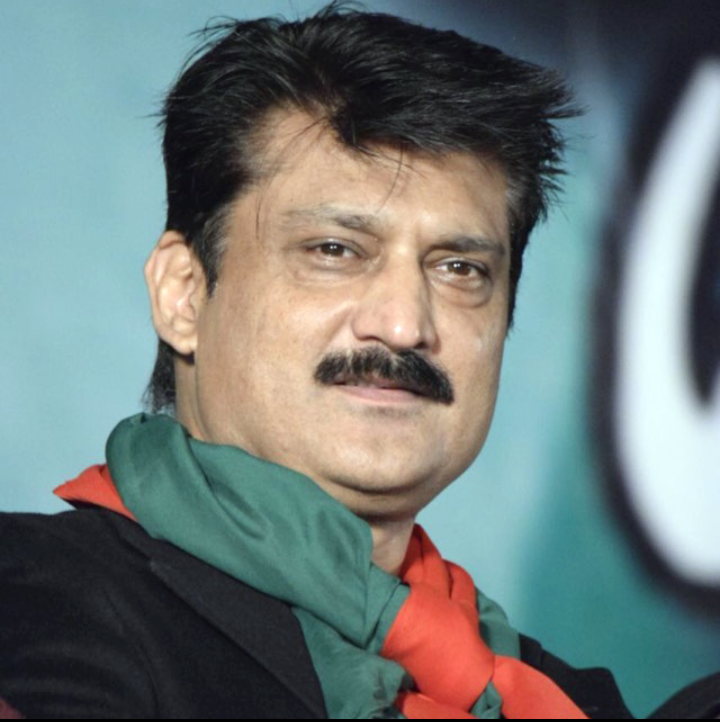

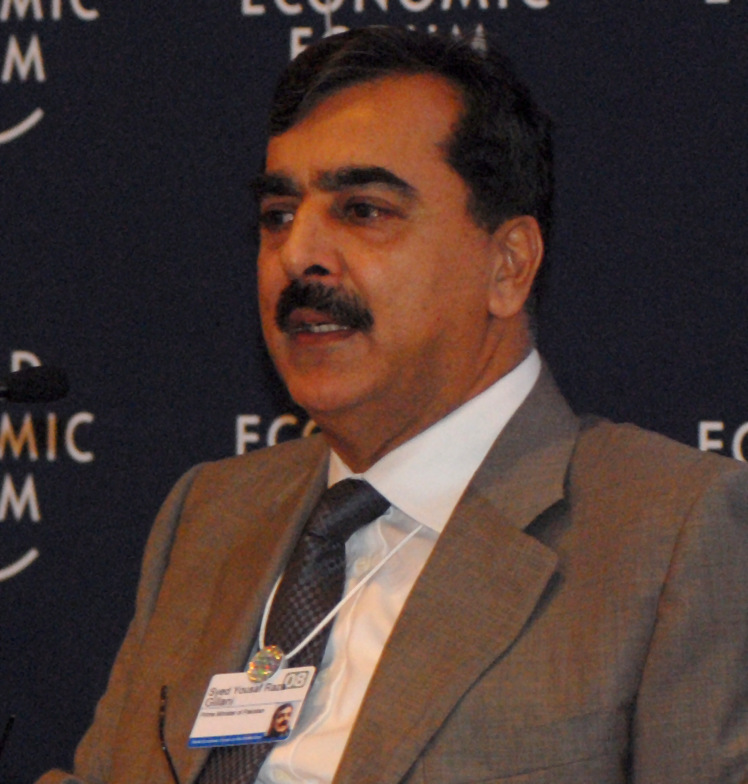

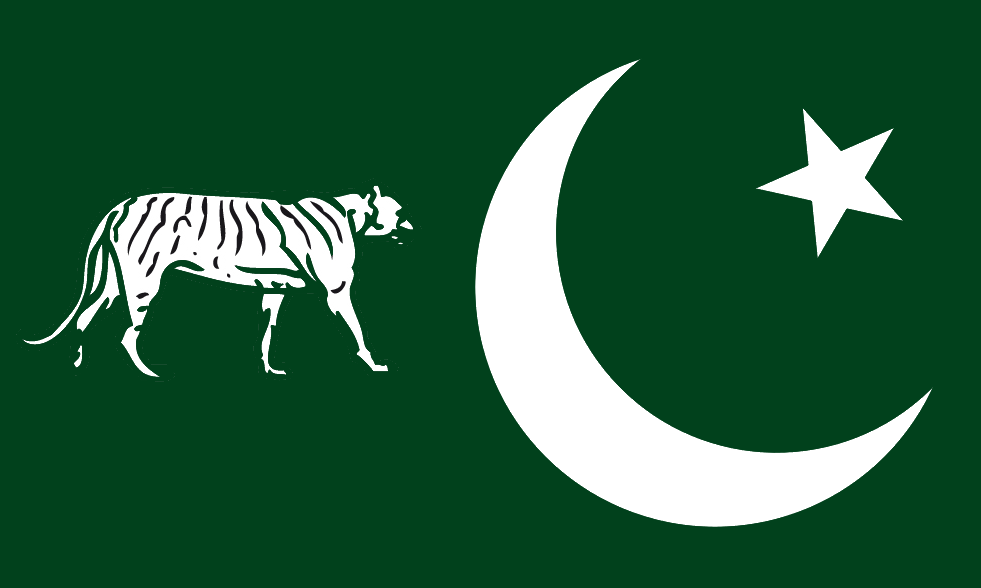
	Majority party	Minority party	Third party
Leader	Shahzad Waseem	Yousaf Raza Gillani	Raja Zafar-ul-Haq
Party	PTI	PPP	PML(N)
Leader's seat	General Punjab	General Islamabad	Technocrat Punjab
Last election	15	21	29
Seats won	26	21	18
Seat change	▲11	–	▼11
Chairman before election
Sadiq Sanjrani
BAP
Elected Chairman
Sadiq Sanjrani
BAP

The 2021 Pakistani Senate election was held on 3 March 2021. The Election commission of Pakistan announced the election schedule on 11 February 2021. 52 of the 104 Senators had retired on 7 February 2021. After the merger of the Federally Administered Tribal Areas with Khyber Pakhtunkhawa, FATA seats were abolished and there was no election on 4 of the 8 seats. The rest of the 4 seats will be abolished in 2024. Official results of the Senate Elections were announced by the Election Commission of Pakistan on 10 March 2021.

== Background ==
2021 election was being conducted amidst an anti-government drive by a coalition of opposition parties, the Pakistan Democratic Movement (PDM). The PDM leaders had earlier threatened to resign en masse from the provincial and national assemblies, and refused to take part in the Senate elections but later relented.

In the lead up to the elections much of the debate surrounded the secrecy of ballot that is observed in the Senate elections, which has always led to allegations of vote trading. The government moved a conditional presidential ordinance and later sought the opinion of the Supreme Court of Pakistan to conduct the elections via open ballot. The Supreme Court, in its judgment, maintained that the elections should by held via secret ballot but their secrecy is not absolute and that the Election Commission of Pakistan (ECP) should employ the latest technology to ensure "that the election is conducted honestly, justly, fairly and in accordance with law and that corrupt practices are guarded against." ECP, in response to the Court's directives, stated that this year's elections will be conducted as per past practice due to the dearth of time.

A night before the election, a video emerged that showed Ali Haider Gillani, son of Yousaf Raza Gillani, lobbying for his father's election bid and showing three government lawmakers how to void their votes. An audio recording also surfaced, with Nasir Hussain Shah giving assurances to Pakistan Tehreek-e-Insaf lawmakers who had allegedly sold their votes.

== Results ==
Overall, Pakistan Tehreek-e-Insaf (PTI) became the largest party in the Senate as it won the most seats, securing 18 of the 48 senate seats up for election; of which 10 came from Khyber Pakhtunkhwa, 5 from Punjab, 2 from Sindh, and one from Islamabad. Pakistan Peoples Party (PPP) came in second by winning 8 seats, of which 7 were won in Sindh and one in Islamabad. Balochistan Awami Party was declared victorious on 6 seats - all from Balochistan. Finally, the Pakistan Muslim League (N) lost its majority in the Senate as it could only manage 5 seats from Punjab against 16 retiring senators.

After the results were declared, much of the focus was on the Islamabad General seat won by PPP's Yousaf Raza Gillani where he beat PTI's incumbent finance minister, Abdul Hafeez Shaikh, by a margin of 5 votes. Although, Gillani was the opposition's joint candidate, he still did not have the required majority unless those on the treasury benches voted for him or intentionally voided their votes in the secret ballot. This fact, coupled with the leaked video of his son, led to PTI petitioning the Election Commission of Pakistan against his victory.

Meanwhile, Gurdeep Singh of the PTI, became the first Sikh to be elected to the Senate of Pakistan as he won the minority seat from Khyber Pakhtunkhwa.

Mohammad Abdul Qadir, who had won as an Independent from Balochistan, later joined the PTI, increasing the tally of the party to 26 in the Senate.

Results
Parties	Votes	%	Seats								
Parties	Votes	%	Total in 2018	Up	Won					Total after	+/-
Parties	Votes	%	Total in 2018	Up	G	W	T	M	Total	Total after	+/-
Pakistan Tehreek-e-Insaf			12	8	9	4	4	1	18	25	+13
Pakistan People’s Party			21	8	6	1	1	0	8	21	–
Pakistan Muslim League (N)			29	16	3	1	1	0	5	18	–11
Balochistan Awami Party			10	3	3	1	1	1	6	13	+3
Jamiat Ulema-e-Islam (F)			4	2	2	0	1	0	3	5	+1
Muttahida Qaumi Movement – Pakistan			5	4	1	1	0	0	2	3	–2
Awami National Party			1	1	2	0	0	0	2	2	+1
National Party			5	3	0	0	0	0	0	2	–3
Pashtunkhwa Milli Awami Party			3	1	0	0	0	0	0	2	–1
Jamaat-e-Islami Pakistan			2	1	0	0	0	0	0	1	–1
Balochistan National Party (Mengal)			1	1	1	0	0	0	1	1	–
Muttahida Qaumi Movement - London			0	0	0	0	0	0	0	0	–
Pakistan Muslim League (Q)			0	0	1	0	0	0	1	1	+1
Tehreek-e-Labbaik Pakistan			0	0	0	0	0	0	0	5	–5
Valid votes											
Blank and invalid											
Total		100	104	52	29	9	8	2	48	100	-4
Abstentions											
Registered voters / Turnout											

=== Results by Administrative Unit ===
The successful candidates for each of the seats were declared on 10 March 2021.

==== Provinces ====
Punjab
Seat Type	Winners						
General	Saifullah Niazi (PTI)	Aon Abbas Bappi (PTI)	Ejaz Chaudhary (PTI)	Afnan Ullah Khan (PMLN)	Sajid Mir (PMLN)	Irfan-ul-Haq Siddiqui (PMLN)	Kamil Ali Agha (PTI)
Technocrat	Syed Ali Zafar (PTI)				Azam Nazeer Tarar (PMLN)		
Women	Zarqa Taimur (PTI)				Saadia Abbasi (PMLN)		

Sindh
Seat Type	Winners						
General	Sherry Rehman (PPP)	Saleem Mandviwalla (PPP)	Syed Muhammad Ali Shah Jamot (PPP)	Taj Haider (PPP)	Shahadat Awan (PPP)	Faisal Vawda (PTI)	Faisal Subzwari (MQM-P)
Technocrat	Farooq Naek (PPP)				Saifullah Abro (PTI)		
Women	Palwasha Mohammad Zai Khan (PPP)				Khalida Ateeb (MQM-P)		

Khyber Pakhtunkhwa
Seat Type	Winners						
General	Mohsin Aziz (PTI)	Liaqat Khan Tarakai (PTI)	Shibli Faraz (PTI)	Faisal Saleem Rahman (PTI)	Zeeshan Khanzada (PTI)	Hidayat Ullah Khan (ANP)	Atta-ur-Rehman (JUI(F)
Technocrat	Dost Muhammad Khan (PTI)			Muhammad Hamayun Mohmand (PTI)			
Women	Sania Nishtar (PTI)				Falak Naz (PTI)		
Minority	Gurdeep Singh (PTI)						

Balochistan
Seat Type	Winners						
General	Mohammad Abdul Qadir (PTI)	Prince Ahmed Umer Ahmedzai (BAP)	Sarfraz Bugti (BAP)	Manzoor Ahmed Kakar (BAP)	Arbab Umar Farooq (ANP)	Abdul Ghafoor Haideri (JUI(F)	Muhammad Qasim (BNP-M)
Technocrat	Saeed Ahmed Hashmi (BAP)				Kamran Murtaza (JUI(F)		
Women	Samina Mumtaz Zehri (BAP)				Naseema Ehsan (BNP(N))		
Minority	Danesh Kumar (BAP)						

==== Federally Administered Unit ====
ICT
Seat Type	Winners
General	Yusuf Raza Gillani (PPP)
Women	Fawzia Arshad (PTI)

== Election of Chairman and Deputy Chairman ==
Two candidates apiece, from the opposition and treasury benches, contested the elections on 12 March 2021. Treasury candidates, Sadiq Sanjrani and Mirza Muhammad Afridi, won the elections for their respective seats.

Candidate	Contesting for	Party	Votes Obtained	Supported by
Sadiq Sanjrani	Chairmanship	BAP	48	Treasury Benches
Mirza Muhammad Afridi	Deputy Chairmanship	PTI	54	Treasury Benches
Yusuf Raza Gillani	Chairmanship	PPP	42	Opposition Benches
Abdul Ghafoor Haideri	Deputy Chairmanship	JUI-F	44	Opposition Benches
