= 2015 Pakistani Senate election =

- 5 March 2015

52 of the 104 seats in the Senate of Pakistan 53 seats needed for a majority

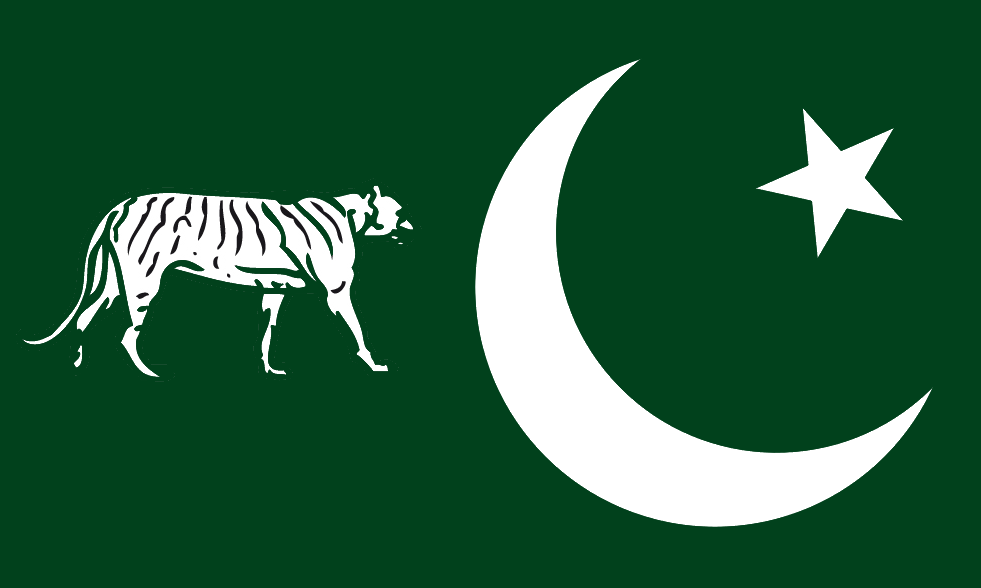

	Majority party	Minority party
Party	PPP	PML(N)
Last election	41	14
Seats won	27	26
Seat change	▼14	▲12
	Third party	Fourth party
Party	MQM	PTI
Last election	7	0
Seats won	8	6
Seat change	▲1	▲6
Chairman before election
Nayyar Hussain Bukhari
PPP
Elected Chairman
Raza Rabbani
PPP

Senate elections were held in Pakistan on 5 March 2015 to elect the replacements for 52 retiring senators. Those retiring include chairman Nayyar Hussain Bukhari and deputy chairman Sabir Ali Baloch of the upper house. Pakistan Peoples Party (PPP), the majority party in Senate, would lose 21 members, followed by Pakistan Muslim League Nawaz would lose 9 and Awami National Party would lose 6 members.

According to the schedule issued by the Election Commission of Pakistan (ECP), nomination papers for the election were submitted on 12 and 13 February, while scrutiny of the papers was held on 16 and 17 February. The list of contesting candidates was issued on 25 February. Polling for the 52 seats will be held on 5 March. For 11 seats, each of the four provinces' polling will be held in the provincial capitals, while polling for seats from the federal capital and FATA will be held in the National Assembly. According to the ECP notification, in each province elections will be held for seven general seats, two seats for technocrats and Ulema and two reserved seats for women.

Elections are held indirectly; to win one seat in Senate, the candidates would require 52 votes from the Punjab Assembly, 24 from the Sindh Assembly, 18 from the Khyber Pakhtunkhwa Assembly and 9 from the Balochistan Assembly.

== Election Day ==
According to The Express Tribune, four contestants already elected unopposed in Sindh – two each from the PPP and MQM – voting was held for the remaining 48 seats with members of the provincial assemblies electing senators on their respective provincial quotas – seven for Sindh, 11 for Punjab, 12 each for Khyber-Pakhtunkhwa (K-P) and Balochistan for different categories of seats. Members of the National Assembly will be voting for two seats for Islamabad Capital Territory (ICT) while MNAs from the Federally Administered Tribal Areas (Fata) will elect four senators from the tribal belt.

According to the final list of contestants notified by the Election Commission of Pakistan (ECP), 84 candidates will contest for 33 general seats from the provinces, Fata and the ICT while 22 candidates will contest for eight seats reserved for women in the provinces and ICT. Eighteen candidates will contest for eight seats reserved for technocrats, including Ulema, while eight others will run for two seats – one each from K-P and Balochistan – reserved for minorities.

=== Violation of party discipline ===
According to the Pakistan Today, in clear violation of the party discipline, members of Khyber Pakhtunkhwa and Balochistan assemblies have proposed and seconded independent or other political parties’ nominees for the Senate elections.

=== Election Fraud Allegations and Delays ===
- Khyber Pakhtunkhwa: Pakistan Peoples Party member of Khyber Pakhtunkhwa assembly, Nighat Orakzai claimed that the ballot papers are being taken to outside the assembly and being stamped, while talking to Dunya News. She alleged to be verbally abused by a government parliamentarians. Additionally, the media was barred from entering the premises of the Khyber-Pakhtunkhwa assembly. Around 11:00 am PST the polling was stopped at the assembly and failed to resume. A lengthy meeting between Chief Minister Pervez Khattak and opposition members took place to resume the voting process, however failed to resume the elections leading the provincial government recommending Election Commission to delay the vote. ECP delayed polling in the K-P Assembly has been to 8pm PST.
- Federally Administered Tribal Areas: According to Radio Pakistan around 12:48pm, polling for the election of four Senators from FATA was stopped after protest from parliamentarians in protest from a Presidential ordinance restricts the representatives from FATA to just one vote instead of four votes.

== Candidates ==
=== Punjab ===
For Punjab, 15 candidates eyed seven general seats, four candidates eyeing two women-reserved seats and two candidates eyeing two technocrat seats.

Province	Name
Punjab	Pervez Rashid (PMLN)
Punjab	Mushahid Ullah Khan (PMLN)
Punjab	Abdul Qayyum (PMLN)
Punjab	Begum Najma Hameed (PMLN)
Punjab	Raja Zafar ul Haq (PMLN)
Punjab	Sajid Mir (PMLN)
Punjab	Nadeem Afzal Chan (PPP)
Punjab	Chauhary Tanveer Khan (PMLN)
Punjab	Dr Asif Kirmani (PMLN)
Punjab	Dr Ghous Niazi (PMLN)

=== Khyber Pakhtunkhwa ===
For Khyber Pakhtunkhwa, 17 candidates ran for seven general seats.

Province	Name
Khyber Pakhtunkhwa	Lt-Gen (retd) Salahuddin Tirmizi(PMLN)
Khyber Pakhtunkhwa	Noor Alam Khan (PPP)
Khyber Pakhtunkhwa	Khanzada Khan (PPP)
Khyber Pakhtunkhwa	Maulana Gul Naseeb Khan (JUI-F)
Khyber Pakhtunkhwa	Maulana Shuja-ul-Mulk (JUI-F)
Khyber Pakhtunkhwa	Mohsin Aziz (PTI)
Khyber Pakhtunkhwa	Shibly Faraz (PTI)
Khyber Pakhtunkhwa	Fazal Muhammad (PTI)
Khyber Pakhtunkhwa	Salman Afridi (PTI)
Khyber Pakhtunkhwa	Samina Abid (PTI)
Khyber Pakhtunkhwa	Rabia Basri (PTI)
Khyber Pakhtunkhwa	Noman Wazir (PTI)
Khyber Pakhtunkhwa	Abdul Latif Yousafzai (PTI)

=== Sindh ===
For Sindh, 18 candidates eyed seven general seats, six candidates eyeing two women seats and four candidates eyeing two technocrat seats

Province	Name
Sindh	Mian Atiq ur Rehman (MQM)
Sindh	Barrister Muhammad Ali Saif (MQM)
Sindh	Nighat Khatoon (MQM)
Sindh	Raza Zaidi (MQM)
Sindh	Farooq Naek (PPP)
Sindh	Rehman Malik (PPP)
Sindh	Islamuddin Shaikh (PPP)
Sindh	Saleem Mandviwalla (PPP)
Sindh	Gyan Chand (PPP)
Sindh	Abdul Latif Ansari (PPP)
Sindh	Sassui Palijo (PPP)
Sindh	Syed Zafar Ali Shah (PMLN)

=== Balochistan ===
In Balochistan's Senate elections Niamatullah Zehri of PML-N, Abdul Ghafoor Haidery of JUI-F, Usman Kakar and Sardar Mohammad Azam Khan of Pakhtunkhuwa Milli Awami Party, Hasil Khan Bazenjo of National Party, Dr Jahanzaib Jamaldini of BNP (Mengal), and Yousaf Badeni (independent) have been elected.

Mir Kabir Ahmed of National Party and Engineer Agha Shahbaz Khan Durrani of PML-N were elected as senator on Technocrats while Kalsoom Perveen of PML-N and Gul Bashra of Pakhtunkhwa Milli Awami Party won the elections on women reserved seats.

Dr Ashok Kumar of National Party was elected as senator on minority seat.

== Results ==
According to unofficial results released by Dunya News, Pakistan Muslim League (N) won 16 seats, Pakistan People’s Party (PPP) got seven, Pakistan Tehreek-e-Insaf won five, Muttahida Qaumi Movement (MQM) collected four, the National Party and Pukhtunkhwa Milli Awami Party got three seats each, Balochistan National Party and Jamiat Ulema-e-Islam (F) got one seat each while an independent candidate also became senator from Balochistan. The PML-N and its allied parties in the province including NP and PkMAP won nine seats.

=== Results by Administrative Unit ===
==== Provinces ====
Punjab
Seat Type	Winners						
General	Mushahid Ullah (PML-N)	Pervaiz Rashid (PML-N)	Nehal Hashmi (PML-N)	Abdul Qayyum (PML-N)	Chaudhry Tanvir (PML-N)	Saleem Zia (PML-N)	Ghaus Khan Niazi (PML-N)
Technocrat	Raja Zafar-ul-Haq (PML-N)			Sajid Mir (PML-N)			
Women	Najma Hameed (PML-N)				Ayesha Raza (PML-N)		

Sindh
Seat Type	Winners						
General	Islamuddin Shaikh (PPP)	Gian Chand (PPP)	Saleem Mandviwalla (PPP)	Abdul Latif Ansari (PPP)	Rehman Malik (PPP)	Khushbakht Shujaat (MQM)	Muhammad Ateeq Shaikh (MQM)
Technocrat	Farooq Naek (PPP)				Muhammad Ali Saif (MQM)		
Women	Sassui Palijo (PPP)				Nighat Mirza (MQM)		

Khyber Pakhtunkhwa
Seat Type	Winners						
General	Shibli Faraz (PTI)	Mohsin Aziz (PTI)	Liaqat Khan Tarakai (PTI)	Atta-ur-Rehman (JUI-F)	Siraj-ul-Haq (JI)	Khanzada Khan (PPP)	Salahuddin Tirmizi (PML-N)
Technocrat	Nauman Wazir Khattak (PTI)			Muhammad Javed Abbasi (PML-N)			
Women	Samina Abid (PTI)				Sitara Ayaz (ANP)		
Minority	John Kenneth Williams (PTI)						

Balochistan
Seat Type	Winners						
General	Hasil Bizenjo (NP)	Usman Kakar (PKMAP)	Sardar Muhammad Azam Khan Musakhel (PKMAP)	Mir Naimatullah Zehri (PML-N)	Abdul Ghafoor Haideri (JUI-F)	Mir Muhammad Yousaf Badini (IND)	Jehanzeb Jamaldini (BNP-M)
Technocrat	Mir Kabeer Ahmed Muhammad Shahi (NP)				Agha Shahbaz Khan Durrani (PML-N)		
Women	Gul Bashra (PKMAP)				Kalsoom Perveen (PML-N)		
Minority	Ashok Kumar (NP)						

==== Federally Administered Units ====
NOTE: FATA only has general seats, while Islamabad has 1 general and 1 technocrat seat that were up in this election.

FATA
Seat Type	Winners			
General	Aurangzeb Khan (Independent)	Taj Muhammad Afridi (Independent)	Haji Momin Khan Afridi (Independent)	Sajjad Hussain Turi (Independent)

== Composition ==
=== Before 2015 elections ===
↓
40	16	12	36
Pakistan Peoples Party	Pakistan Muslim League Nawaz	Awami National Party	Others

=== After 2015 elections ===
↓
27	26	7	6	38
Pakistan Peoples Party	Pakistan Muslim League Nawaz	Awami National Party	Pakistan Tehreek-e-Insaf	Others

== Aftermath ==
As a result of the elections, on 12 March 2015, Raza Rabbani of the Pakistan People's Party (PPP) was elected the chairmanship, unopposed. On the same day, Abdul Ghafoor Haideri of the Jamiat Ulema-e-Islam (F) (JUI-F) was elected the deputy chairmanship, garnering 74 votes and defeating Shibli Faraz of the Pakistan Tehreek-e-Insaf (PTI), who only received 16 votes. Rabbani and Haideri succeeded Nayyar Hussain Bukhari and Sabir Ali Baloch, both of the PPP, respectively. On the same day, Raja Zafar-ul-Haq of the Pakistan Muslim League (N) (PML(N)) was re-appointed as the Leader of the House, while Aitzaz Ahsan of the PPP was re-appointed as the Leader of the Opposition.
