= Khanzada Khan (Pakistani politician) =

Politician in Pakistan

Senator Khanzada Khan
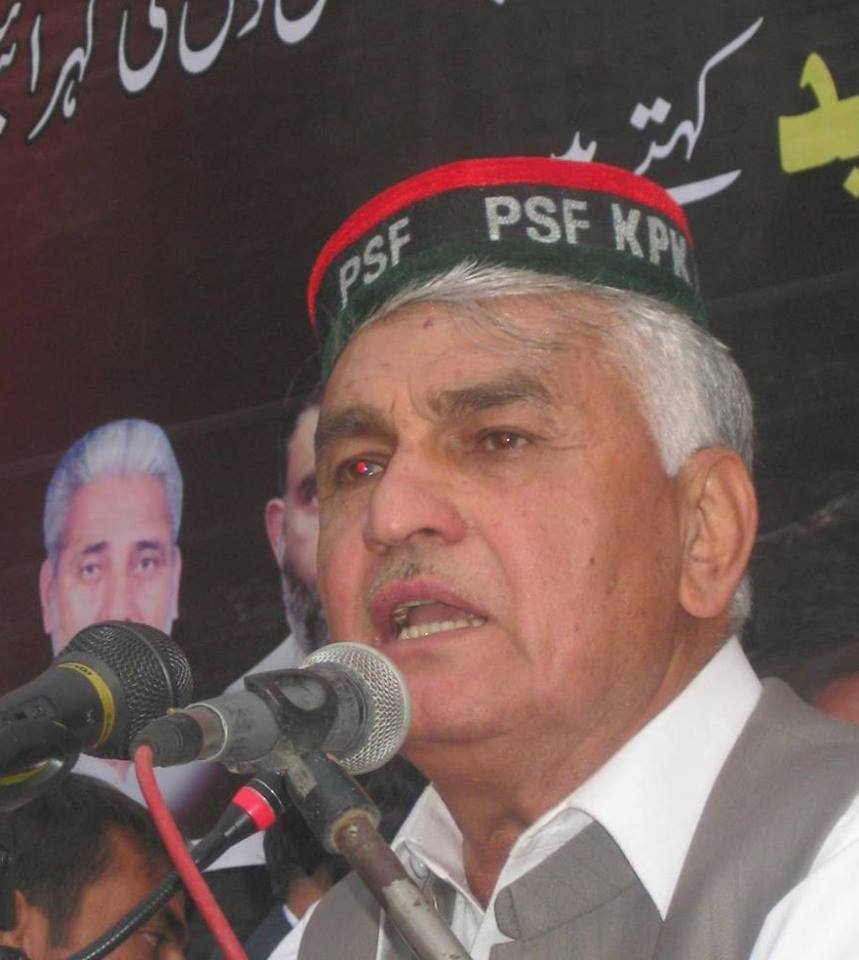
- Khanzada Khan

Member of the Senate of Pakistan
- In office March 2015 – 30 October 2019

Member of the National Assembly of Pakistan
- In office 2008–2013

Personal details
- Party: Pakistan Peoples Party
- Children: Zeeshan Khanzada

Haji Khanzada Khan (Urdu: حاجی خانزادہ خان) is a Pakistani politician who had been a member of the Senate of Pakistan from March 2015 till October 2019. Previously he has been a member of the National Assembly of Pakistan from 2008 to 2013. Since he joined the party, Khan has served with great loyalty to the nation and remains an active member.

== Education ==
He has done Bachelor of Business Administration from Al-Khair University in 2003.

== Political career ==
He was elected to the National Assembly of Pakistan from NA-6 (Mardan-I) as a candidate of Pakistan Peoples Party (PPP) in the 1993 Pakistani general election. He received 38,525 votes and defeated Muhammad Saneer Khan, a candidate of the Awami National Party (ANP).

He was re-elected to the National Assembly from NA-11 (Mardan-III) as a candidate of PPP in the 2008 Pakistani general election. He received 20,896 votes and defeated Taj-ul-Amin Jabal, a candidate of the Muttahida Majlis-e-Amal (MMA).

He ran for the seat of the National Assembly from NA-11 (Mardan-III) as a candidate of PPP in the 2013 Pakistani general election but was unsuccessful. He received 23,619 votes and was defeated by Mujahid Ali, a candidate of the Pakistan Tehreek-e-Insaf (PTI).

He was elected to the Senate of Pakistan as a candidate of PPP in the 2015 Pakistani Senate election.

He resigned from the Senate on 30 October 2019.
