= Palwasha =

Palwasha: (پلوشه) is a feminine given name originating in Pashto, meaning ray of light.

Notable people named Palwasha include:

- Palwasha Bashir, Pakistani badminton player
- Palwasha Khan, Pakistani politician
- Palwasha Mohammad Zai Khan, Pakistani politician
- Palwasha Hassan, Afghan activist
