= Gul Bashra =

Pakistani politician

Senator Gul Bashra

Member of the Senate of Pakistan
- Incumbent
- Assumed office March 2015

Personal details
- Party: Pakhtunkhwa Milli Awami Party

Gul Bashra (Urdu: گل بشری) is a Pakistani politician who has been a member of Senate of Pakistan since March 2015.

== Political career ==
She was elected to the Senate of Pakistan as a candidate of Pakhtunkhwa Milli Awami Party on reserved seat for women in the 2015 Pakistani Senate election.
