= Saifullah Niazi =

Pakistani politician

Member of the Senate of Pakistan
- Incumbent
- Assumed office 12 March 2021

Personal details
- Party: PTI (1996-present)

Saifullah Sarwar Khan Niazi is a Pakistani politician who has been a member of the Senate of Pakistan since March 2021. He has also been the chief organizer of Pakistan Tehreek-e-Insaf (PTI) since March 2019. He is one of the founding members of PTI, joining it in 1996. He was the polling agent for Imran Khan when he unsuccessfully contested election in 1997. He got elected unopposed in the 2021 Senate Elections from Punjab.
