= Muhammad Ateeq Shaikh =

Senator Mian Muhammad Ateeq Shaikh

Member of the Senate of Pakistan
- In office March 2015 – March 2021

Personal details
- Other political affiliations: Muttahida Qaumi Movement

Mian Muhammad Ateeq Shaikh (Urdu: میاں محمد عتیق شیخ) is a Pakistani politician whio was a Member of Senate of Pakistan, affiliated with the Mutahidda Qaumi Movement.

He is a businessman by profession and is the founder and chief executive of the Shalimar Group of Companies.

== Political career ==
Shaikh began his political career by joining the Muttahida Qaumi Movement in 2012.

He became a member of the central executive committee of the Muttahidda Qaumi Movement before becoming a member of the coordination committee in 2013.

In 2014, he became the first president of the Muttahidda Qaumi Movement chapter in Punjab.

In 2015, he was selected by the Muttahidda Qaumi Movement to run for the seat of Senate of Pakistan in 2015 Pakistani Senate election from Sindh. Some members of the MQM questioned the decision of Altaf Hussain to give the ticket to Shaikh to run in the Senate election from Sindh despite the fact that he hails from Punjab. The Sindh United Party challenged the election of Sheikh as senator from Sindh for being a non-Sindhi and petitioned to get him disqualified.

He was elected to the Senate of Pakistan for the first time in 2015 Pakistani Senate election as a candidate of Muttahidda Qaumi Movement.

In September 2016, a petition was filed to disqualify Shaikh from membership of the Senate for being "disloyal" to Pakistan following the controversial speech by Altaf Hussain. In October 2016, chairman of the Senate rejected the petition.

In September 2017, he was expelled from the MQM.
