= Abdul Latif Ansari =

Pakistani politician

- عبدالطیف انصاری

Member of the Senate of Pakistan
- In office March 2015 – May 2015

Personal details
- Party: Pakistan Peoples Party

Abdul Latif Ansari (Urdu: عبدالطیف انصاری) is a Pakistani politician who has been a member of the Senate of Pakistan from March 2015 to May 2015.

== Political career ==
He was elected to the Senate of Pakistan from Sindh as a candidate of Pakistan Peoples Party in the 2015 Pakistani Senate election. In May 2015, he resigned to allow Sherry Rehman to replace him as the member of the Senate.
