= Ministry of Religious Affairs and Inter-faith Harmony =

Government ministry of Pakistan

- وزارت مذہبی امور و بین المذاہب ہم آہنگی وزارۃ الشؤن الدینیہ والوئام بین الادیان

Government Organization overview
- Formed: 14 August 1973; 52 years ago
- Jurisdiction: Government of Pakistan
- Headquarters: T.U.V. Blocks, Kohsar Block, Opposite Punjab House, Islamabad, Pakistan; 33.7413411964465°N 73.09252097522672°E
- Employees: 500
- Annual budget: Rs.493 million (2021)
- Minister responsible: Sardar Muhammad Yousuf
- Government Organization executive: Federal Secretary, Mr. Zulfiquar Haider
- Website: Official website

The Ministry of Religious Affairs and Interfaith Harmony (Urdu: وزارت مذہبی امور و بین المذاہب ہم آہنگی, abbreviated as MoRA) is a government agency of Pakistan responsible for religious matters such as pilgrimage outside Pakistan, especially to Iran and Iraq for Ziyarat, and Saudi Arabia for Umrah and Hajj. It is also responsible for the welfare and safety of pilgrims. The agency has its headquarters in Islamabad.

The Ministry was established by Prime Minister Zulfikar Ali Bhutto. Its first minister was Maulana Kausar Niazi.

== Wings ==
The ministry is composed of several subordinate bodies including:

- Hajj Wing
- Administration and Finance Wing
- Dawah and Ziyarat Wing
- Development and Coordination Wing
- Research and Reference Wing
- Interfaith Harmony Wing
- Office of Pilgrims' Affairs Pakistan (OPAP), KSA

== List of ministers ==
The following it the list of Federal Ministers for Religious Affairs:

No.	Name	Tenure start	Tenure end
1	Maulana Kausar Niazi	14 August 1973	5 July 1977
2	A. K. Brohi	5 July 1978	23 August 1978
3	Mahmoud A. Haroon	21 April 1979	9 March 1981
4	General Muhammad Zia-ul-Haq	9 March 1981	15 March 1981
5	Alhaj Mohammad Abbas Khan Abbasi	15 March 1981	18 March 1984
6	Raja Zafar-ul-Haq	19 March 1984	26 February 1985
7	Dr. Muhammad Afzal	28 February 1985	24 March 1985
8	Muhammad Khan Junejo	10 April 1985	28 January 1986
9	Mir Haji Tareen	28 January 1986	28 August 1986
10	Iqbal Ahmed Khan	28 August 1986	20 December 1986
11	Syed Qasim Shah	1 February 1987	29 March 1987
12	Haji Muhammad Saifullah Khan	29 March 1987	29 May 1988
13	Maulana Wasi Mazhar Naqvi (Caretaker Government)	9 June 1988	19 November 1988
14	Khan Bahadur Khan	23 March 1989	6 August 1990
15	Hazar Khan Bijarani	7 October 1990	6 November 1990
16	Sardar Mehtab Ahmed Khan	28 March 1991	10 September 1991
17	Maulana Muhamad Abdus Sattar Khan Niazi	10 September 1991	18 July 1993
18	Justice (R) Abdul Shakurul Islam	18 July 1993	19 October 1993
19	Jehangir Bader	31 July 1996	5 November 1996
20	Faridullah Khan (Caretaker Government)	6 November 1996	17 February 1997
21	Raja Zafar-ul-Haq	11 July 1997	12 October 1999
22	Abdul Malik Kasi	6 November 1999	15 August 2000
23	Dr. Mahmood Ahmad Ghazi	15 August 2000	5 August 2002
24	Owais Ahmed Ghani	5 August 2002	23 November 2002
25	Ijaz-ul-Haq	24 March 2004	16 November 2007
26	Khawaja Attaullah Taunsa Sharif (Caretaker Government)	16 November 2007	25 March 2008
27	Syed Khurshid Ahmed Shah	11 April 2008	3 November 2008
28	Hamid Saeed Kazmi	14 November 2008	14 December 2010
29	Syed Khurshid Ahmed Shah	14 December 2010	16 March 2013
30	Shahzada Jamal Nazir (Caretaker Government)	3 April 2013	4 June 2013
31	Sardar Muhammad Yousaf	7 June 2013	31 May 2017
32	Muhammad Yusuf Shaikh (Caretaker Government)	5 June 2018	20 August 2018
-	Imran Khan	18 August 2018	20 August 2018
33	Noor-ul-Haq Qadri	20 August 2018	10 April 2022
34	Mufti Abdul Shakoor	19 April 2022	15 April 2023
35	Muhammad Talha Mahmood	15 April 2023	10 August 2023
36	Aniq Ahmed (Caretaker Government)	17 August 2023	04 March 2024
37	Chaudhry Salik Hussain	3 April 2024	25 February 2025
38	Sardar Muhammad Yousuf	7 March 2025	Incumbent

== See also ==
- Punjab Auqaf and Religious Affairs Department
