= Sardar Muhammad Azam Khan Musakhel =

Pakistani politician (died 2018)

Member of the Senate of Pakistan
- In office March 2015 – 15 December 2018

Personal details
- Party: Pakhtunkhwa Milli Awami Party

Sardar Muhammad Azam Khan Musakhel (Urdu: سردار محمد اعظم خان موسی خیل) was a Pakistani politician who is currently a member of Senate of Pakistan, representing Pakhtunkhwa Milli Awami Party. He died on 15 December 2018.

== Political career ==
He was elected to the Senate of Pakistan as a candidate of Pakhtunkhwa Milli Awami Party in the 2015 Pakistani Senate election.
