= Nauman Wazir Khattak =

Pakistani politician

Member of the Senate of Pakistan
- Incumbent
- Assumed office March 2015

Personal details
- Party: Pakistan Tehreek-e-Insaf
- Spouse: Rubina Gillani

Nauman Wazir Khattak (Urdu: نعمان وزیر خٹک) is a Pakistani industrialist, politician, and former Pakistan Air Force officer. He served as a member of Senate of Pakistan from 2015 to 2021. He is the founder of FF Steel.

== Biography ==
Khattak was born in Adamzai village, Nowshera District, Khyber Pakhtunkhwa. He received his early education at Presentation Convent School, Murree, and PAF School, Peshawar. In 1973, he joined the Pakistan Air Force, where he earned a degree in aeronautical engineering from Pakistan Air Force, College of Aerounatical Engineering, affiliated with NED University of Engineering and Technology in 1977.

Khattak retired from the Pakistan Air Force in 1987 as a squadron leader to found a steel mill named Frontier Foundry Steel in Peshawar.

Previously, Khattak held board memberships at Peshawar Electric Supply Company (PESCO), Small and Medium Enterprise Development Authority (SMEDA), and the Pakistan Industrial & Technical Assistance Center (PITAC). He has represented Pakistan internationally, including at the United Nations' 13th session of the Metal Trades Committee in Geneva and as a leader of delegations to Indonesia and India.

Khattak was elected to the Senate of Pakistan as a candidate of Pakistan Tehreek-e-Insaf in the 2015 Pakistani Senate election.
