= Samina Abid =

Pakistani politician

Member of the Senate of Pakistan
- Incumbent
- Assumed office March 2015

Personal details
- Party: Pakistan Tehreek-e-Insaf

Samina Abid (Urdu: ثمینہ عابد) is a Pakistani politician and a member of Senate of Pakistan, representing Pakistan Tehreek-e-Insaf.

== Political career ==
She was elected to the Senate of Pakistan as a candidate of Pakistan Tehreek-e-Insaf on reserved seat for women in the 2015 Pakistani Senate election.
