= Ahmad Faraz =

Pakistani poet (1931–2008)

HP HI SI Ahmad Faraz
- احمد فراز
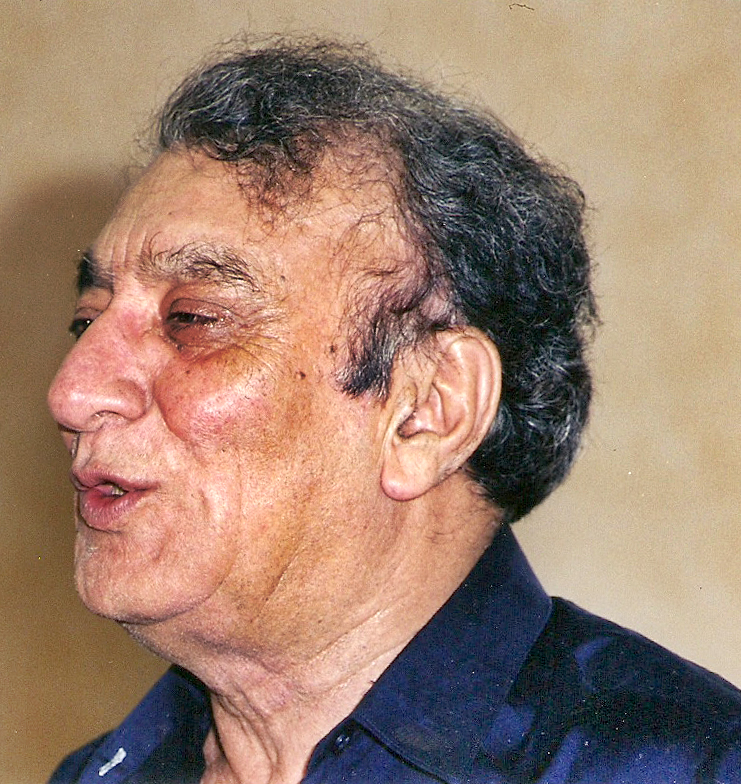
- Ahmad Faraz, in Toronto 2005
- Born: Syed Ahmad Shah; 14 January 1931; Nowshera, NWFP, British India (now Khyber Pakhtunkhwa, Pakistan)
- Died: 25 August 2008 (aged 77); Islamabad, Islamabad Capital Territory, Pakistan
- Citizenship: Pakistani
- Education: Edwardes College, University of Peshawar
- Occupations: Urdu Poet, Lecturer
- Children: 3, including Shibli Faraz
- Writing career
- Pen name: Faraz Urdu: فراز
- Period: 1950–2008
- Genre: Urdu Ghazal
- Subjects: Romance, Politics, Resistance
- Notable awards: Sitara-i-Imtiaz (Star of Excellence) Award; Hilal-e-Imtiaz (Crescent of Excellence) Award; Hilal-e-Pakistan (Crescent of Pakistan) Award; Nigar Awards
- Movement: Democratic Movement

Syed Ahmad Shah (Urdu: سید احمد شاہ; 14 January 1931 – 25 August 2008), better known by his pen name Ahmad Faraz, (Urdu: احمد فراز) was a Pakistani Urdu poet, scriptwriter and became the founding director general (later chairman) of Pakistan Academy of Letters. He wrote his poetry under the pseudonym Faraz. (Note: Takhallus is a pseudonym, fictitious or a pen name used by the Urdu or Persian speaking people when they perform a particular social or cultural role such as poetry etc.) He criticised military rule and coup d'état in the country and was displaced by the military dictators.

== Early life and education ==
Faraz was born Syed Ahmad Shah on 14 January 1931 in Kohat, NWFP, British India (now Khyber Pakhtunkhwa, Pakistan), the son of Agha Syed Muhammad Shah Bark Kohati. He belonged to a Pashtun-Syed family. His father was a teacher who composed Persian poetry . His brother Masood Kausar has been the Governor of Khyber Pakhtunkhwa. He studied at Edwardes College, Peshawar and received his Master's degree in Urdu and Persian from Peshawar University. During his college life, the two poets Faiz Ahmad Faiz and Ali Sardar Jafri influenced him and became Faraz's role models.

== Career ==
=== Literature ===
After gaining early recognition as a poet through recitations of his ghazals on Radio Pakistan Peshawar, Faraz moved to Karachi, where he worked as a radio producer. He later returned to Peshawar and was appointed chairman of the Pakistan Academy of Letters.

Faraz emerged as one of the most prominent voices of modern Urdu poetry in the second half of the 20th century. Associated with the post-Progressive tradition, his poetry combined classical ghazal aesthetics with contemporary political, social, and romantic themes. Beginning with his early collections in the late 1950s, Faraz gained wide popularity for his accessible diction, emotional intensity, and engagement with themes of love, resistance, exile, and dissent. His work often reflected opposition to authoritarianism and social injustice, particularly during periods of political repression in Pakistan, which led to censorship and, at times, self-imposed exile. Over the course of his career, he published numerous influential poetry collections and a small body of prose, and he remains one of the most widely read and recited Urdu poets of his generation. His literary contributions have been extensively documented in literary histories, critical essays, and obituaries.

Singers such as Mehdi Hassan, Noor Jehan, Ghulam Ali, Pankaj Udhas, Jagjit Singh and Runa Laila greatly popularized his poetry by singing his ghazals in films and in live concerts.

Ahmad Faraz served as Chairman of the National Book Foundation in Islamabad, Pakistan.

=== Politics ===
In his early years, Faraz was associated with the Khaksar movement, reflecting his early exposure to political and social activism. The Khaksar was a socio-political movement founded in British India by Allama Inayatullah Mashriqi, advocating discipline, self-reliance, social equality, and resistance to colonial rule.

Faraz was arrested for writing poems that criticised military rulers in Pakistan during the reign of General Zia-ul-Haq. Following that arrest, he went into a self-imposed exile. He stayed for 3 years in Britain, Canada, and Europe before returning to Pakistan, where he was initially appointed as Chairman of the Pakistan Academy of Letters and later chairperson of the Islamabad-based National Book Foundation for several years.

== Death and legacy ==
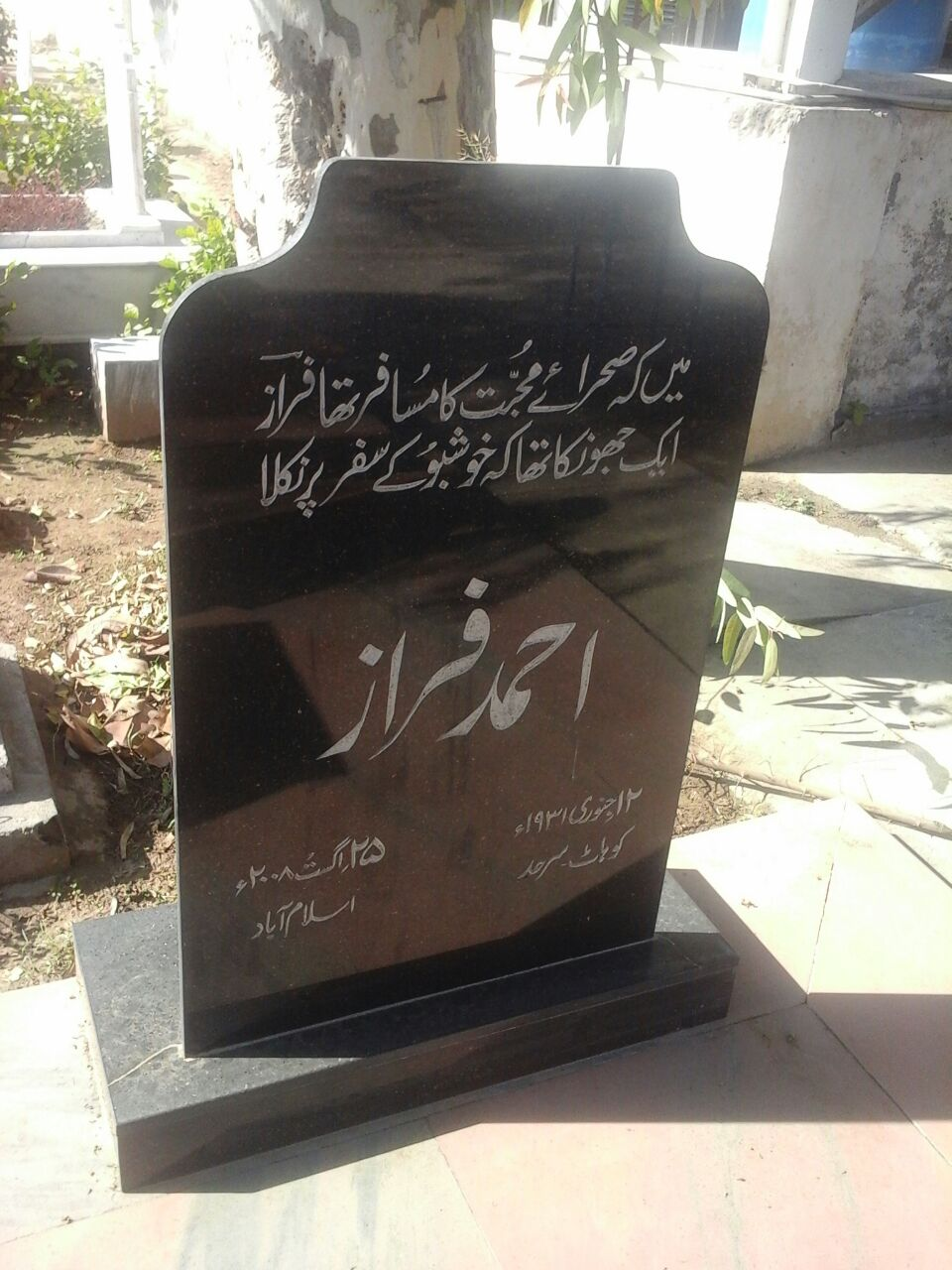
Ahmad Faraz's tombstone

Earlier in 2008, after a fall in Baltimore, Maryland, there were rumors of his death while he was being treated in a Chicago hospital. But he was able to return to his homeland, Pakistan. Ahmad Faraz later died of kidney failure, confirmed by his son Shibli Faraz, in a private hospital in Islamabad on 25 August 2008. His funeral was held on the evening of 26 August, among many admirers and government officials at H-8 Graveyard, Islamabad, Pakistan.

Ahmad Faraz is included in the long list of revolutionary poets of Urdu language and is "acclaimed as one of the most influential modern Urdu poets of the last century."

"This felicity with words is evident in much of Faraz's work, as is an economy of expression, along with an ability to wrap layers of meaning into brief lines, the hallmark of an artist who has a command over his craft."

== Awards and recognition ==
Ahmad Faraz was first awarded the Sitara-i-Imtiaz by the Government of Pakistan and then the Hilal-e-Imtiaz in 2004 by the then President of Pakistan Pervez Musharraf. He returned this award two years later in 2006 "as a means of protest against the actions of the Musharraf regime."

On 25 August 2008, he died in Islamabad, and later Government of Pakistan conferred Hilal-e-Pakistan posthumously upon Faraz for his contribution to poetry and Urdu literature.

== Books ==
Year	Title	Urdu title	Genre	Notes
1958	Tanhā Tanhā	تنہا تنہا	Poetry	Early poetic collection.
1961	Dard-e-Āshob	دردِ آشوب	Poetry	Poetry reflecting social unrest and political anxiety.
1968	Shab-e-Khūn	شبِ خون	Poetry	Politically charged poems critiquing authoritarianism.
1972	Jānāñ Jānāñ	جاناں جاناں	Poetry	Poems marking a mature synthesis of love and resistance.
1974	Pas-e-Andāz-e-Mausam	پسِ اندازِ موسم	Poetry	Romantic and political themes.
1981	Khwāb Gul Pareshāñ Hai	خواب گل پریشاں ہے	Poetry	Lyrical poetry exploring love, loss, and disillusionment.
1982	Ghazal Bahānah Karūñ	غزل بہانہ کروں	Poetry	Ghazals combining classical form with contemporary themes.
1987	Ghazal ke Ātishkadē	غزل کے آتش کدے	Prose (literary criticism)	Critical essays on the ghazal tradition and its evolution.
1988	Nāyāft	نایافت	Poetry	Introspective poetry from his later creative period.
1999	Bayān-e-Farāz	بیانِ فراز	Prose (interviews)	Interviews and prose reflections on literature and society.
—	Kulliyāt-e-Ahmad Farāz	کلیاتِ احمد فراز	Compilation	Complete poetic works.
	Ai Ishq-e-Junuñ-Pēshā	اے عشقِ جنوں پیشہ	Poetry	

== See also ==
- List of Urdu-language writers
- Read about Ahmad Faraz in Arabic Language.
