= John Kenneth Williams =

Pakistani politician and army officer

Senator John Kenneth Williams

Member of the Senate of Pakistan
- Incumbent
- Assumed office March 2015

Personal details
- Party: PTI (2015-present)

John Kenneth Williams is a Pakistani politician and former army officer, has served as a member of the Senate of Pakistan since March 2015.

== Political career ==
He was elected to the Senate of Pakistan as a candidate of Pakistan Tehreek-e-Insaf on reserved seat for minorities in the 2015 Pakistani Senate election.
