= Matore =

- Union council
- Location in Punjab, Pakistan Location in Pakistan
- Coordinates: 33°31′51″N 73°28′41″E
- Country: Pakistan
- Province: Punjab
- District: Rawalpindi
- Tehsil: Kahuta

Government
  - chairman: Raja Ishtiaq
  - vice chairman: Raja Sherbahadur

Matore is a village, surrounded by hills, in the heart of Kahuta Tehsil a subdivision of Rawalpindi District, in the Punjab province of Pakistan. It is located at 33°32′N 73°29′E at an altitude of 778 meters (2,555 feet). Some major tourist attractions in Maira-Matore include the shrine of the Janjua ancestor “Dada Pir Kala”, and a pond created by Sultan Sarang Khan called “Badda.”

The village consists predominantly of the Janjua Rajput clan. Prominent figures from Matore include general Shah Nawaz Khan, who served in the Indian National Army (INA) during World War II, and Raja Zafar-ul-Haq, a senator serving as the chairman of the Pakistan Muslim League (N).
