= Rida Khan =

Pakistani politician

Member of the National Assembly of Pakistan
- In office 1 June 2013 – 31 May 2018
- Constituency: Reserved seat for women

Personal details
- Party: Pakistan Muslim League (N)
- Parent: Mushahid Ullah Khan (father)
- Relatives: Afnan Ullah Khan (brother)

Rida Khan (Urdu: ردا خان) is a Pakistani politician who was a member of the National Assembly of Pakistan from June 2013 to May 2018.

== Political career ==
She was elected to the National Assembly of Pakistan as a candidate of Pakistan Muslim League (N) on reserved seats for women from Punjab in the 2013 Pakistani general election.
