= Kausar Niazi =

Pakistani politician (1934–1994)

Maulana Kausar Niazi

Chairman of the Council of Islamic Ideology
- In office 15 December 1993 – 19 March 1994
- Preceded by: Mohammad Haleem
- Succeeded by: Iqbal Ahmad Khan

Federal Minister for Information
- In office 28 March 1977 – 5 July 1977
- President: Fazal Ilahi Chaudhry
- Prime Minister: Zulfikar Ali Bhutto

Federal Minister for Religious, Minority Affairs and Overseas Pakistanis
- In office 5 February 1976 – 28 March 1977
- President: Fazal Ilahi Chaudhry
- Prime Minister: Zulfikar Ali Bhutto

Federal Minister for Religious Affairs
- In office 22 October 1974 – 5 February 1976
- President: Fazal Ilahi Chaudhry
- Prime Minister: Zulfikar Ali Bhutto

Member of the National Assembly of Pakistan
- In office 26 March 1977 – 5 July 1977
- Constituency: NA-107 Sialkot IV
- In office 14 April 1972 – 10 January 1977
- Constituency: NW-75 Sialkot II

Personal details
- Born: Muhammad Hayat Khan; 21 April 1934 Musa Khel, Punjab Province, British India
- Died: 19 March 1994 (aged 59) Islamabad, Pakistan
- Party: Pakistan People's Party (PPP)
- Other political affiliations: Jamaat-e-Islami

Kausar Niazi (Urdu: کوثر نیازی), born as Muhammad Hayyat Khan and commonly known as Maulana Kausar Niazi (21 April 1934 – 19 March 1994), was a prominent Pakistani politician and a religious scholar. A key figure in Zulfikar Ali Bhutto's Pakistan Peoples Party (PPP), he was one of the most influential federal ministers in Bhutto's cabinet from 1974 to 1977. Known for his eloquence and religious scholarship, Niazi played a pivotal role in shaping policy and remained one of Bhutto’s closest aides and most trusted confidants.

Born in Musakhel, Punjab, he hailed from a distinguished family; his father Fateh Khan Niazi Luqi-khel, and uncle Muzaffar Khan Niazi Luqi-khel, were prominent figures in the region. Niazi's political career was marked by steadfast loyalty to Bhutto, serving as a minister for six years and actively contributing to the PPP's vision.

== Early life ==
Kausar was born into a Pathan family of the Niazi in the Musa Khel village of Mianwali in the Punjab Province, British Indian Empire on 21 April 1934.

== Career ==
Kausar Niazi was an active member of one of Pakistan's leading religious parties, the Jamaat-i-Islami (JI) in the 1950s and in the 1960s. In 1953, he was arrested and jailed by the Pakistani government for taking part in the violent anti-Ahamdiyya riots in Lahore. Niazi was also highly vocal in his support for JI's criticism of General Ayub Khan's dictatorship from 1958 to 1969. The JI had accused Ayub of damaging the role of Islamic scholars in Pakistan. However, after Ayub Khan replaced his young foreign minister, Z. A. Bhutto in 1966, Niazi supported Bhutto's rebellious stand against Ayub Khan over the 1965 ceasefire against India. When Bhutto formed his own party in 1967 – Pakistan Peoples Party (PPP), the JI Party condemned Bhutto and his party of being a party of communists who were being backed by the Soviet Union to destroy the Islamic religion in Pakistan.

After disagreeing with Jamaat-e-Islami stand against Bhutto, Niazi broke away from the party. He was then asked by Bhutto to join the PPP. Bhutto was looking for an Islamic religious scholar to join his party. Bhutto was looking for someone with some religious knowledge who could blunt the JI attacks against the PPP. PPP's leftist ideologues did not want Kausar Niazi coming into the PPP. But Bhutto intervened and overruled their concerns, suggesting that Kausar Niazi fully supported the party's socialist programme.

Kausar Niazi contested the Pakistani general election, 1970 from a constituency in Sialkot area even though he was originally from the Mianwali District.

The constituency in Sialkot where Niazi was contesting had a large Ahmadiyya population. But Niazi, conveniently changing his earlier anti-Ahmadiyya position, painted himself as a 'progressive Muslim scholar' and a strong supporter of the PPP's socialist manifesto. He decided to have many meetings with the leaders of the Ahamdiyya community. He convinced them that the PPP would never allow Pakistan's religious parties to outlaw the Ahmadiyya community from the fold of Islam. He assured them that the PPP would definitely help and support them.

According to the recently published memoirs of late Barrister Azizullah Shiekh — a famous lawyer and former member of the leftwing National Awami Party (NAP) — the Ahmadiyya community, before getting Niazi's assurances, had already struck a deal with the leaders of NAP. The NAP had also promised the community that it would keep the right-wing / religious parties from reviving the anti-Ahmadiyya campaign.

However, Kausar succeeded in making the Ahmadiyya community choose the PPP over NAP and vote for the PPP across Pakistan. This also helped Naizi to win the election from his Sialkot constituency where he received over 90,000 votes. In December 1971, after the departure of East Pakistan (that became Bangladesh), Bhutto was invited to form the new government because the PPP had won the most seats from West Pakistan.

He served as the minister of Religious and Minorities Affairs until 1976 and was later appointed the Federal Information Minister. Maulana Kausar Niazi said that Zia-ul-Haq had deposed and ultimately destroyed Zulfikar Ali Bhutto. He later visited India as the goodwill emissary of the acting Prime Minister Ghulam Mustafa Jatoi.

In his later years, Maulana Kausar Niazi was rewarded for his loyalty to the Bhutto clan by being nominated to serve as the Chairman of the Islamic Ideology Council during Ms Benazir Bhutto's second government.

== Death ==
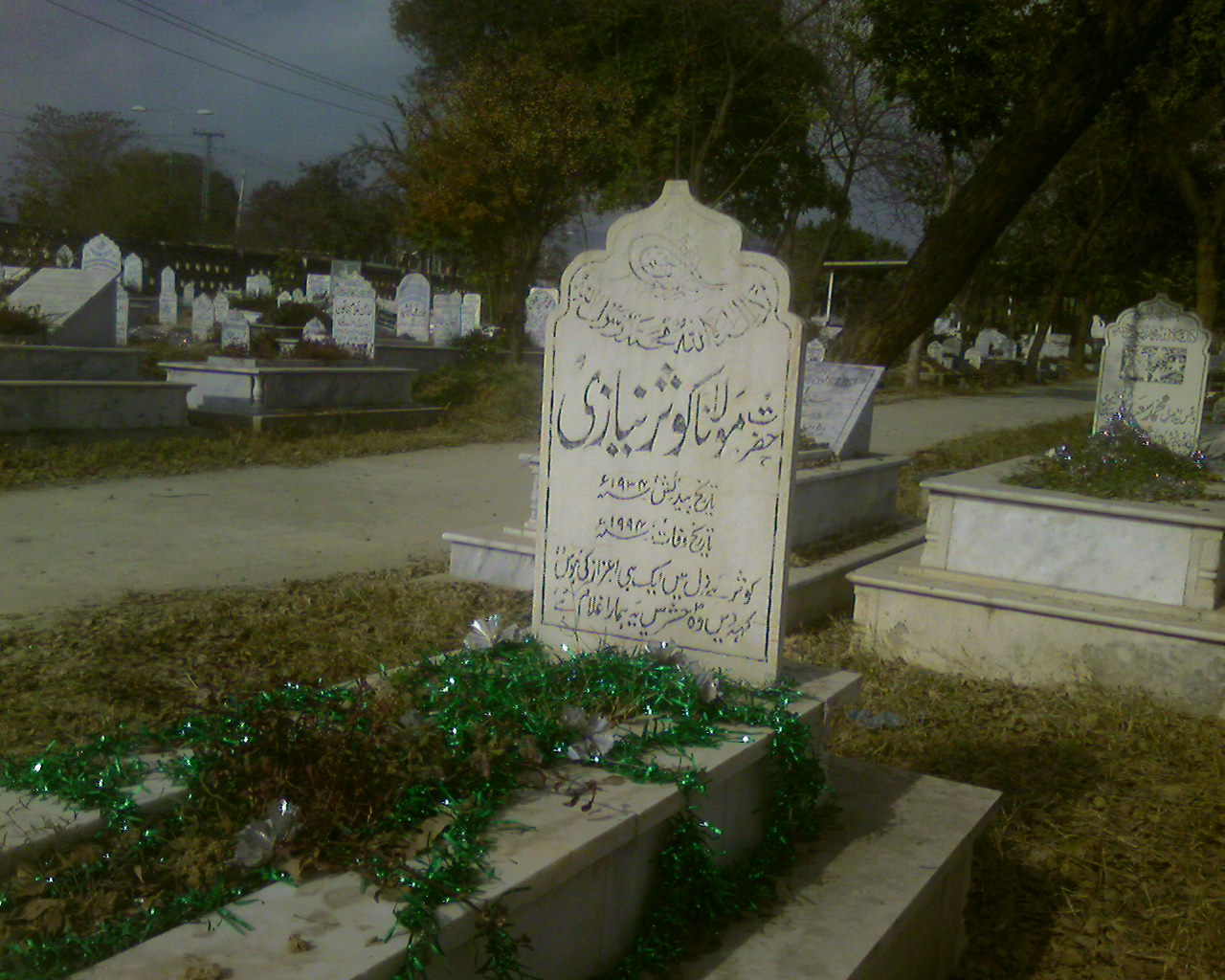
Niazi's grave at H-8 graveyard Islamabad

Kausar Niazi died in 1994 after a prolonged illness and was buried at H-8 Graveyard in Islamabad.

== Writings ==
He has published several books. Some of his publications include:

=== Urdu ===
- Jamāʻat-i Islāmī ʻavāmī ʻadālat men̲, on Jamaat-e-Islami.
- Mut̤ālaʻah-yi tārīk̲h̲, essays on history.
- Lamḥe, poems.
- Matāʻ-i suk̲h̲an : kulliyāt, collected poetry.
- Irān, Shahanshāh se K̲h̲umainī tak, short political history of Iran, with particular reference to the Islamic revolution in 1979.
- Naqsh-i rahguzar, travel impressions of India, 1984, with particular reference to the author's meetings with various Indian politicians, journalists, etc.
- Maulá ʻAlī, on the life of ʻAlī ibn Abī Tālib, 600 (ca.)-661,4th Caliphs of Islam.
- Maulā Ḥūsain, collection of speeches from 1970-1974.
- Mushāhadāt o taʼās̲s̲urāt, articles, chiefly political, by a noted Pakistani religio-political writer, previously published in daily Jang, Lahore, Pakistan.
- Jinhen̲ main̲ ne dekhā, author's memoirs about his contemporaries.
- Kohqāf ke des men̲ : safarnamah-yi Rūs, travel impressions of the Soviet Union, 1987.
- Z̲ikr-i Rasūl, thoughts on the teachings of prophet Muhammad.
- Aur lāʼin kaṭ gaʼī, on the political turmoil in Pakistan after the 1977 general elections, followed by martial law.

=== English ===
This includes works he originally wrote in English directly, as well translations of his works by others:

- Fundamental truths. Pakistan: Sh. Muhammad Ashraf Kashmiri Bazar Lahore, 1976 (1st Ed, 1974), 148 pp..
- Towards understanding the Qurʼan
- To the Prophet
- Creation of man
- Modern challenges to Muslim families
- Role of the mosque
- Zulfiqar Ali Bhutto of Pakistan, last days
- Islam, our guide
- Islam and the West
- Mirror of Trinity
- Iqbal and the third world
- Economic concepts in Islam
- Study of history
- The Prophet of revolution
- The role of the mosque
- Islam and the West
- Economic concepts in Islam
