= Muhammad Ali Saif =

Pakistani politician

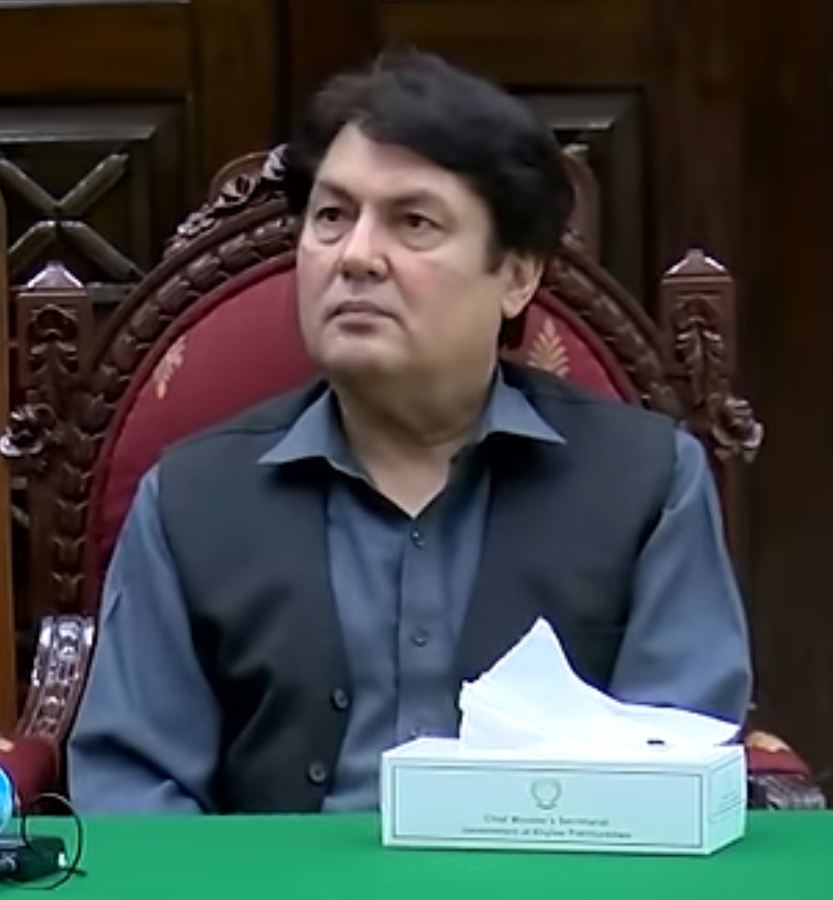

Advisor to Chief Minister of Khyber Pakhtunkhwa on Information & Public Relations
- In office 7 March 2024 – 13 October 2025

Member of the Senate of Pakistan
- In office March 2015 – March 2021

Minister of Tourism and Youth Affairs
- In office November 2007 – March 2008
- President: Pervez Musharraf
- Prime Minister: Muhammad Mian Soomro

Personal details
- Party: PTI (2021-present)
- Other political affiliations: MQM-P (2013-2021); APML (2010-2013); IND (2007-2008)

Muhammad Ali Khan Saif (Pashto: محمد علی خان سیف) is a Pakistani politician from Swabi, Khyber Pakhtunkhwa, He had been a member of Senate of Pakistan, from March 2015 to March 2021. He served as Federal Minister for Tourism and Youth Affairs from November 2007 to March 2008 in the caretaker federal cabinet of Prime Minister Muhammad Mian Soomro.

He served as advisor to Chief Minister Khyber Pakhtunkhwa, Ali Amin Gandapur on Information and Public Relations in the PTI government from March 2024 to October 2025.

== Education ==
He completed his LLB (Honors) from the University of Buckingham in 1991 and LLM in Human Rights Law from the University of Essex in 1993. In 1995, he received LL.M in International Law from the University of London.

In addition, he also holds two PhDs, one from the University of Wales in Law, and another from Quaid-e-Azam University in Anthropology (Suicide Terrorism). Besides, he is a doctoral candidate at the University of Halle, Germany in South Asian Studies.

== Political career ==
In November 2007, he was inducted into the caretaker federal cabinet of Prime Minister Muhammad Mian Soomro and was appointed as Federal Minister for Tourism with the additional ministerial portfolio of Youth Affairs. He served as Minister for tourism, and youth affairs until 25 March 2008.

He was a member of the Musharraf-led All Pakistan Muslim League (APML) before joining the Muttahida Qaumi Movement (MQM) in 2013.

He was elected to the Senate of Pakistan as a candidate of Muttahida Qaumi Movement Pakistan in 2015 Pakistani Senate election. He retired on 11 March 2021 as a member of the Senate of Pakistan upon his completion of 6 year term.

He then joined Pakistan Tehreek-e-Insaf (PTI) in March 2021, one day before his term as a senator ended after meeting with Imran Khan and Fawad Chaudhry.

He was appointed by Chief Minister Ali Amin Gandapur as Advisor to the Chief Minister on matters of Information and Public Relations on 7 March 2024. In this role, he broadcast many statements such as supporting Gandapur, Imran Khan, PTI, denouncing PML-N, and commenting on judicial matters related to PTI as a barrister, as well as announcing Gandapur’s Khyber Pakhtunkhwa life insurance scheme.
