= Raja Zafar-ul-Haq =

Chairman of the Pakistan Muslim League (N)

Leader of the House for Senate of Pakistan
- In office 12 March 2015 – 25 August 2018
- Preceded by: Aitzaz Ahsan
- Succeeded by: Shibli Faraz

Leader of the Opposition for Senate of Pakistan
- In office 26 August 2018 – 11 March 2021
- Prime Minister: Imran Khan
- Preceded by: Sherry Rehman
- Succeeded by: Yusuf Raza Gillani

Member of the Senate of Pakistan from Punjab
- In office 12 March 2009 – 11 March 2021

Minister of Religious Affairs
- In office 21 February 1997 – 12 October 1999
- Prime Minister: Nawaz Sharif
- Preceded by: Jehangir Bader
- Succeeded by: Dr. Mahmood Ahmed Ghazi
- In office 1981–1985
- President: Zia-ul-Haq
- Preceded by: Kausar Niazi
- Succeeded by: Iqbal Ahmad Khan

Pakistan Ambassador to Egypt
- In office 1985–1986
- President: Zia-ul-Haq

Minister of Information and Broadcasting
- In office 1981–1985
- President: Zia-ul-Haq

Chairman of the PML(N)
- Incumbent
- Assumed office 20 February 2000
- President: Shehbaz Sharif

Personal details
- Born: Raja Muhammad Zafar-ul-Haq; 18 November 1935 (age 90) Matore, Punjab, British India (present-day Punjab, Pakistan)
- Party: PML(N) (since 2000)
- Children: Raja Muhammad Ali (son)
- Education: Govt. College University (B.A. in Phil.); Punjab University (LLB, MSc in Poly Sci.)
- Profession: Lawyer; diplomat

Raja Zafar-ul-Haq (Urdu: راجہ ظفرالحق; born 18 November 1935), is a Pakistani politician and lawyer, who served as senator from the Punjab, being elected on 12 March 2009. He had been the leader of the opposition in Senate from 2018 to 2021. He is serving as the Chairman of the Pakistan Muslim League (N), a centre-right party, since 20 February 2000.

A retired diplomat and lawyer by profession, Zafar-ul-Haq served as the Minister of Religious Affairs under Zia-ul-Haq from 1981 to 1985 and occupied the post again during the second administration of Prime Minister Nawaz Sharif from 1997 until being removed by Musharraf's coup d'état in 1999. Haq is known for his views for support of the religious conservatism but strongly advocated for religious temperance and humility.

In addition, he is also known for leading the constitutional initiatives to form the inquiry commission on the Kargil War, against Pervez Musharraf, whom he saw as a "traitor", and voiced support for civilian control of the military.

== Early life and career in law ==
Zafar-ul-Haq was born in a small village, Matore, located in Kahuta Tehsil, Rawalpindi District, Punjab in British India into a Punjabi Muslim family of the Rajput-Janjua clan on 18 November 1935. His father, Raja Fazal Dad Khan, was a Deputy Superintendent of Police in the Punjab Police Department. Zafar-ul-Haq attended various high schools in Punjab, and matriculated from Sialkot in 1952.

He went to attend the Government College University in Lahore, where he secured his graduate with B.A. in Philosophy in 1956. He went on to attend the law school of the Punjab University to read law and political science, graduating with a LLB degree in civil law and a MSc in political science in 1958.

He started practicing law with the firm S.M. Zafar associates in Lahore, but later moved to Rawalpindi where he took cases and practiced law until 1981. In 1977, he was elected as the president of the Rawalpindi Bar Association and was serving as vice president of the Punjab Bar Council in 1981. Zafar-ul-Haq moved to Islamabad where he became member of the Supreme Court Bar Association and became the supreme court advocate from 1985 until 1987.

== Political career ==
Haq has a long and extensive political career. He became a member of the Pakistan Muslim League soon after graduating in 1956 and has maintained his loyalty to the party for over fifty years. Haq has held numerous positions within the Pakistan Muslim League, beginning with his election as the General Secretary of the party in District Rawalpindi from 1963 to 1971. He later served as the President of the Pakistan Muslim League in the Rawalpindi District from 1971 to 1981. In addition to his party roles, Haq also made contributions to legal and social reforms, serving as the President of the Rawalpindi Bar Association and Vice President of the High Court Bar.

In the 1980s, Haq was appointed Minister for Information & Broadcasting and Minister for Religious Affairs. During his tenure, he spearheaded the Committee for Social Reforms and the reform of Pakistan Penal Code and Evidence Act. He also represented Pakistan at the United Nations General Assembly in the 45th Session from 1990 to 1991. Haq was elected as a member of the Pakistan Senate in 1991 and later served as the Chairman of the Standing Committee on Law and Religious Affairs.

In addition to his political and legal work, Haq held several noteworthy international positions. He served as the Ambassador of Pakistan to Egypt and was appointed as the Political Adviser to the Prime Minister of Pakistan with the status of a Federal Minister. He was also elected as the Secretary General of the World Muslim Congress, an international organization of Muslims with consultative status observed with the UN and its allied bodies and observer status with the OIC. Haq served as a Leader of the Opposition and Leader of the House in the Senate of Pakistan.

Haq has been extensively involved in the Pakistan Muslim League (N), holding positions such as Central Vice President and later Chairman from 2000 to 2009 and then re-elected in 2011. He was also elected as the Secretary General of the Motamar Al-Alam Al-Islami on multiple occasions, continuing his affiliation with the organization over the years. Haq's significant contributions to Pakistani politics led to his appointment as the Leader of the Opposition in the Senate of Pakistan in 2018, where he represented the largest party with 30 Senators.

=== Ambassadorship to Egypt and Religious minister in Sharif administrations ===
Since 1963, Zafar-ul-Haq had been participating in the national politics on a Pakistan Muslim League (PML) and is known for reflected views on religious conservatism while stressing to adopt humility to prevent violence and insanity. From 1980–81, Zafar-ul-Haq served as a member on the Panel of Experts for Pakistan Law Commission under the Ministry of Law and Justice. In 1981, he joined the Zia administration as the Information Minister and the Minister of Religious Affairs which served until 1985.

In 1985, President Zia-ul-Haq appointed him as the Pakistan Ambassador to Egypt which he tenured until 1986 when he was appointed as an adviser to Zia administration. He advised Prime Minister Mohammad Junejo on political and legal matters until 1987, and sided to join the Pakistan Muslim League (N) led by its President Fida Mohammad. In 1990–91, Zafar-ul-Haq presented Pakistan in the International Law Commission of the United Nations and was elected as Pakistan Senator for the first time in 1991 for a six-year term. In 1992, he was appointed in the Board of Trustees (BoT) of International Islamic University in Islamabad until 1997. During this time, he was appointed as the Secretary-General of the World Muslim Congress until 1997.

In 1997, he participated in the nationwide general elections on a Rawalpindi constituency which he successfully defended, and joined the second administration of Prime Minister Nawaz Sharif as the Minister of Religious Affairs. He played a crucial and vital role in drafting the Fifteenth Amendment to the Constitution of Pakistan to declare the "Islam as the Supreme Law"— the amendment was passed with the two-thirds majority in the National Assembly (lower house) but failed to be passed in the Senate (Upper house) in 1999.

Over the Kargil conflict in 1999, he reportedly warned the BJP ministry in India of "Pakistan resorting to the nuclear weapons issue if the country's territorial integrity, security and sovereignty is harmed. But he was not involved in the national security matters at that time, and was seen as a political statement which he stated during the meeting with his constituents.

In 2000, Zafar-ul-Haq was elected as the Chairman of the Pakistan Muslim League (N), which he is currently serving, whilst Javed Hashmi became the President of Pakistan Muslim League (N).

On 4 December 2001, Zafar-ul-Haq appealed to the religious and conservative mass to call for the massive public demonstration against Pervez Musharraf, leading the pro-democracy movement with Amin Fahim to restore the civilian control. In 2009 he was elected to the Pakistani Senate for a six-year term. He was elected as the leader of the Independent Opposition Group (consisting of more than 6 parliamentary parties) in the Senate of Pakistan in 2009.

On 15 February 2018, PML(N) announced to appoint Zafar-ul-Haq for the Chairman Senate for the senate elections that were scheduled on 12 March 2018. Despite the PML(N) successfully retained the majority in the Senate, Zafar-ul-Haq's bid for the chairmanship was fell short through the number countings and, was defeated by independent Sadiq Sanjrani, who had support from the Asif Zardari and Imran Khan in spite of their disagreement.

Upon hearing the news of the number manipulation in the Senate elections, PML(N)'s leadership and the Prime Minister Shahid Abbasi reacted very negatively, and reportedly quoted in the news media that "Sanjrani holds no respect", and calls were made for the reelection of the Senate elections.

On 24 August 2018, he was appointed leader of the opposition in the Senate.

=== Political positions and views ===
His views reflected the religious conservatism but has strongly voice for the religious sanity and the interfaith dialogue among the three Abrahamic religions– Judaism, Christianity, and Islam. In his public speaking at the conservative conventions in the country, Zafar-ul-Haq has strongly stressed and argued for the religious temperance.

In 2005, Zafar-ul-Haq demanded the inquiry commission on kargil debacle to be investigated by the Supreme Court of Pakistan to point and recommend the punishment for those involved.

After his removal from the Minister of Religious Affairs in 1999 due to the military takeover in 1999, Zafar-ul-Haq viewed very negatively of the performance of the Musharraf administration, which he implicated was working towards weakening the state on a deliberate international agenda. In an interview in 2012, Zafar-ul-Haq held President Musharraf responsible of promoting religious intolerance in the country by introducing legislative reforms reflecting against the teachings of Islam without the consent of the public. He also accused Musharraf of starting the starting the armed conflict to harm the Kashmir cause, and raised his voice for civilian control of the military. Though, he has repeatedly spoken very highly of Nawaz Sharif's services done to the country and Islam, he remained unsympathetic to suicide attacks taking place on Pervez Musharraf.

In 2011, he was quoted as saying that Islam is the prime source behind the uprising movements in the Middle East and North Africa. His statement came in response to the European intervention in Libya in favor of the Libyan Opposition.

== See also ==
- Democratic movements in Pakistan
  - Civilian control of the military
  - Civil-military relations
  - Khakistocracy
  - Movement to impeach Pervez Musharraf
  - General Musharraf vs. Federation of Pakistan, et.al.
- Post Cold War era
- Conservatism in Pakistan
  - Islam in Pakistan
  - Christianity in Pakistan
  - Islam and Christianity
  - Interfaith dialogue

Political offices
Preceded by Kausar Niazi	Minister of Religious Affairs; 1981–1985	Succeeded by Iqbal Ahmad Khan
Preceded by Jehangir Bader	Minister of Religious Affairs; 1997–1999	Succeeded by Mahmood Ahmed Ghazi
Senate of Pakistan
Preceded by Aitzaz Ahsan	Leader of the House for the Senate of Pakistan; 2015–2018	Succeeded by Shibli Faraz
Preceded by Sherry Rehman	Leader of the Opposition in the Senate; 2018–2021	Succeeded by Yusuf Raza Gilani
