= Afnan Ullah Khan =

Pakistani politician

Senator Afnan Ullah Khan
- افنان اللہ خان

Senate of Pakistan
- Incumbent
- Assumed office 3 March 2021
- Constituency: Sindh

Personal details
- Born: Karachi, Sindh, Pakistan
- Party: PMLN (2018-present)
- Parent: Mushahid Ullah Khan (father)
- Relatives: Rida Khan (sister)

Afnan Ullah Khan (Urdu: افنان اللہ خان) is a Pakistani politician who is currently serving as a member of the Senate of Pakistan, elected on a general seat from Sindh, since March 2021. He belongs to PMLN. He is the son of a former federal minister and senator Mushahid Ullah Khan.

== Political career ==
He contested the 2018 Pakistani general election as a candidate of the Pakistan Muslim League (N) from NA-247 Karachi South-II, but was unsuccessful. He revived 18,158 votes and lost to Arif Alvi, a candidate of the Pakistan Tehreek-e-Insaf (PTI).

He was elected to the Senate of Pakistan in the 2021 Pakistani Senate election as a candidate of the PML(N). He was elected unopposed.

In December 2021, he publicly opposed Pakistan's reported plans to procure the Chinese J-10C fighter jets. In a statement on social media, he questioned the rationale behind acquiring the aircraft, arguing that Pakistan already operated F-16s in a similar class and that the J-10C was inferior to the Indian Air Force's Rafale. He suggested that the funds would be better spent on developing indigenous capabilities, such as the JF-17 program and Project Azm, aimed at building a fifth-generation stealth fighter.

In May 2024, he criticized the election of independent candidates to the Senate, including Naqvi, describing it as a continuation of the hybrid system. He stated that although most of the PML-N opposed supporting independent candidates like Naqvi, the decision was made by Nawaz Sharif.

== Controversies ==
In October 2023, after the beginning of the Israeli military offensive in Gaza, he shared a post on his X account where he claimed the world now knows why Hitler committed the Holocaust.

== Books ==
- Pakistan — The Way Forward, Jumhoori Publications, 2014, 259 p.
