= Nighat Mirza =

Pakistani politician

Member of the Senate of Pakistan
- Incumbent
- Assumed office March 2015

Personal details
- Party: MQM-P (2023-present)
- Other political affiliations: PSP (2016-2023); MQM-L (2015-2016)

Nighat Mirza (Urdu: نگہت مرزا) is a Pakistani politician who is currently a member of Senate of Pakistan, representing Muttahida Qaumi Movement – Pakistan.

== Education ==
She has done BA from Gov. College for Women between 1973 and 1974 and L.L.B. from Sindh Muslim Law College between 1975 and 1976.

She further done MA International Relations from University of Karachi between 2011 and 2012, and MA Islamic Studies from University of Karachi between 2003 and 2006.

== Political career ==
She was elected to the Senate of Pakistan as a candidate of Muttahida Qaumi Movement in the 2015 Pakistani Senate election.
