= NA-21 Mardan-I =

Constituency of the National Assembly of Pakistan

- Constituency for the National Assembly of Pakistan
- Region: Rustam Tehsil, Katlang Tehsil and Takht Bhai Tehsil (partly) and Mardan District
- Electorate: 430,538

Current constituency
- Party: Pakistan Tehreek-e-Insaf
- Member: Mujahid Ali
- Created from: NA-20 Mardan-I

NA-21 Mardan-I (این اے-21، مردان-۱) is a constituency for the National Assembly of Pakistan. The constituency was formerly known as NA-11 (Mardan-III) from 1977 to 2018. The name changed to NA-20 (Mardan-I) after the delimitation in 2018 and to NA-21 (Mardan-I) after the delimitation in 2022.

== Members of Parliament ==
=== 1988–2002: NA-6 Mardan-I ===
Election	Member	Party
1988	Haji Yaqoob Khan	PPP
1990	Azam Khan Hoti	ANP
1993	Khanzada Khan	PPPP
1997	Naseem Ur Rehman	ANP

=== 2002–2018: NA-11 Mardan-III ===
Election	Member	Party
2002	Maulana Dr. Ataur Rehman	MMA
2008	Khanzada Khan	PPPP
2013	Mujahid Ali	PTI

=== 2018–2022: NA-20 Mardan-I ===
Election	Member	Party
2018	Mujahid Ali	PTI

=== 2023–present: NA-21 Mardan-I ===
Election	Member	Party
2024	Mujahid Ali	SIC

== Elections since 2002 ==
=== 2002 general election ===
2002 General Election: NA-11 (Mardan-III)
Party	Candidate	Votes	%	±%
MMA	Maulana Dr. Ataur Rehman	51,918	71.81	
ANP	Habib Ullah Khan	14,462	20.00	
PTI	Dr Muhammad Afzal Khan	5,923	8.19	
Majority		37,456	51.81	
Turnout		72,303	33.14	
MMA gain from PML-N				

A total of 1,757 votes were rejected.

=== 2008 general election ===
2008 General Election: NA-11 (Mardan-III)
Party	Candidate	Votes	%	±%
PPPP	Khanzada Khan	20,896	52.32	
MMA	Maulana Taj-ul-Amin Jabal	18,155	45.46	−26.35
Independent	Muhammad Waqar	193	0.48	
Independent	Bakhtiar Ali	186	0.47	
Independent	Murad Ali Shah	153	0.38	
Independent	Shah Hassan	110	0.28	
Independent	Syed Naveed Ali Shah	105	0.26	
Independent	Mumtaz Ali Khan	58	0.14	
QWP	Asif Nawaz	37	0.09	
PML	Amresh Khan	29	0.07	
Independent	Muhammad Atiqur Rehman	19	0.05	
Majority		2,741	6.86	
Turnout		39,941	15.77	−17.37
PPPP gain from MMA				

A total of 495 votes were rejected.

=== 2013 general election ===
2013 General Election: NA-11 (Mardan-III)
Party	Candidate	Votes	%	±%
PTI	Mujahid Ali	38,233	28.85	
JUI-F	Imdad Ullah Yousafzai	26,623	20.09	
PPPP	Khanzada Khan	23,928	18.05	−34.27
JI	Gul Nawaz Khan	15,536	11.72	
PML-N	Sher Afghan Khan	12,659	9.55	
ANP	Inayat Khan	11,506	8.68	
TTP	Muhammad Saleem Khan	1,166	0.88	
Independent	Syed Amin Shah Bacha	707	0.53	
PkMAP	Ikram ul Haq Khan	652	0.49	
Jannat Pakistan	Abdul Nazeer	352	0.27	
Tehreek-e-Ittehad Ummat	Himmat Ali	327	0.25	
Independent	Bakhtiar Ali	267	0.20	
JUP-N	Wahid Ali Naqshband	220	0.17	
APML	Syed Naveed Ali Shah	187	0.14	
Independent	Nawab Ali	176	0.13	
Majority		11,610	8.76	
Turnout		132,539	42.00	+26.23
PTI gain from PPPP				

A total of 3,970 votes were rejected.

=== 2018 general election ===
General elections were held on 25 July 2018.

General election 2018: NA-20 (Mardan-I)
Party	Candidate	Votes	%	±%
PTI	Mujahid Ali	78,140	40.19	▲11.34
ANP	Gul Nawaz Khan	38,713	19.91	▲11.23
PPP	Muhammad Khan Hoti	36,312	18.68	▼1.23
MMA	Attaur Rehman	28,840	14.83	
PML(N)	Akhtar Nawaz	5,355	2.75	▼6.80
Turnout		194,435	45.16	▲3.16
Rejected ballots		7,075	3.64	
Majority		39,427	20.28	▲11.52
Registered electors		430,538		
PTI hold		Swing	▲5.40	

=== 2024 general election ===
General elections were held on 8 February 2024. Mujahid Ali won with 119,068 votes.

General election 2024: NA-21 Mardan-I
Party	Candidate	Votes	%	±%
PTI	Mujahid Ali (Note: Filed nomination papers as PTI candidate but ECP allowed him to run as an Independent)	119,068	51.18	▲10.99
JUI (F)	Azam Khan	52,222	22.45	N/A
ANP	Ahmad Ali	31,560	13.57	▼6.34
PPP	Asad Ullah Khan	16,720	7.19	▼11.49
Others	Others (seven candidates)	13,066	5.62	
Turnout		237,681	45.56	▲0.40
Rejected ballots		5,045	2.12	
Majority		66,846	28.73	▲8.45
Registered electors		521,739		

== See also ==
- NA-20 Swabi-II
- NA-22 Mardan-II
