= Khurram Zeeshan =

Pakistani politician

- خُرم ذیشان

Member of the Senate of Pakistan
- Incumbent
- Assumed office 30 October 2025
- Preceded by: Shibli Faraz
- Constituency: Khyber Pakhtunkhwa general seat

Personal details
- Party: PTI (2025-present)

Khurram Zeeshan is a Pakistani politician affiliated with the Pakistan Tehreek-e-Insaf (PTI). On 30 October 2025, Zeeshan was elected as a member of the Senate of Pakistan, representing a general seat of the Provincial Assembly of Khyber Pakhtunkhwa.
