= Aon Abbas =

Pakistani politician

President of PTI South Punjab
- Incumbent
- Assumed office 4 June 2022
- Chairman: Imran Khan; Gohar Ali Khan

Member of the Senate of Pakistan
- Incumbent
- Assumed office March 2021
- Constituency: Punjab Province

Special Assistant to Prime Minister on E-Commerce
- In office 24 November 2021 – 10 April 2022

Personal details
- Party: PTI (2010-present)

Aon Abbas is a Pakistani politician who is serving as member of the Senate of Pakistan from the Punjab Province since March 2021. He was the Special Assistant to the Prime Minister on E-commerce from November 2021 till April 2022. He belongs to the Pakistan Tehreek-e-Insaf.

== Political career ==
He was elected to the Senate of Pakistan on a general seat from Punjab as a candidate of the Pakistan Tehreek-e-Insaf (PTI) in the 2021 Pakistani Senate election.

On 4 June 2022, he was appointed as the President of the PTI's South Punjab chapter by Imran Khan, the chairman of the party.
