= Humayun Mohmand =

Pakistani politician

Member of the Senate of Pakistan
- Incumbent
- Assumed office March 2021
- Constituency: Technocrat seat from Khyber Pakhtunkhwa

Personal details
- Party: PTI (2021-present)
- Education: Ayub Medical College; University of Peshawar; Royal College of Surgeons of Edinburgh (FRCS)
- Profession: Doctor, Politician

Dr. Muhammad Humayun Mohmand (Pashto: محمد ہمایوں مہمند) is a Pakistani politician who is currently serving as a member of the Senate of Pakistan from the Khyber Pakhtunkhwa since March 2021. He belongs to Pakistan Tehreek-e-Insaf.

== Political career ==
He was elected to the Senate of Pakistan on a technocrat seat from Khyber Pakhtunkhwa as a candidate of the Pakistan Tehreek-e-Insaf (PTI) in the 2021 Pakistani Senate election.
