= Rao Abdus Sattar =

Pakistani politician

1st Leader of the House for the Senate of Pakistan
- In office 6 August 1973 – 4 July 1977
- Prime Minister: Zulfiqar Ali Bhutto
- Preceded by: Office established

Personal details
- Party: Pakistan Peoples Party

Rao Abdus Sattar (Urdu: راؤ عبد الستار) is a Pakistani politician who serves as the Senator from Sahiwal, Pakistan, in office since 1973.
