= Samina Mumtaz Zehri =

Pakistani politician

Member of the Senate of Pakistan
- Incumbent
- Assumed office March 2021
- Constituency: Balochistan

Personal details
- Party: BAP (2018-present)

Samina Mumtaz Zehri (Urdu: ثمینہ ممتاز زہری) is a Pakistani politician who is a member of the Senate of Pakistan, representing Balochistan, Pakistan since March 2021. In 2022, she was elected Vice President of the BAP.

Zehri also holds the position for the of Chairperson of the Senate's Functional Committee on Human Rights, where she plays a key role in advancing legislative reforms and advocating for human rights protections in Pakistan.

Drawing on her legal expertise, Zehri has been a practicing lawyer since her enrolment in the Sindh High Court on 17 January 2012, and in both the Sindh Bar Council and Karachi Bar Association since 5 May 2007. Her legislative focus includes corporate, financial, and banking reforms, legal aid systems, human rights, and civil and criminal law.

A strong advocate for social reform, Zehri has called for more inclusive and supportive workplaces for women, emphasising the need for improved recruitment, training, and recognition of women’s contributions. She has consistently stressed the importance of amplifying women’s voices in professional spaces.

Zehri also introduced the “Pakistan Penal Code (Amendment) Bill, 2024,” aimed at explicitly criminalising necrophilia by amending Section 377 (unnatural offences), which is punishable by life imprisonment. Initially, she proposed expanding the definition to include offences against children, but on the advice of the Law and Interior Ministries, the bill focuses specifically on crimes involving "dead bodies."

Additionally, Zehri serves on the Board of Directors of the Hub Power Company.
