= Mujahid Ali =

Pakistani politician (born 1972)

- مجاہدعلی

Member of the National Assembly of Pakistan
- Incumbent
- Assumed office 29 February 2024
- Constituency: NA-21 Mardan-I
- In office 13 August 2018 – 20 January 2023
- Constituency: NA-20 (Mardan-I)
- In office 1 June 2013 – 31 May 2018
- Constituency: NA-11 (Mardan-III)

Personal details
- Born: 3 April 1972 (age 54) Mardan, Khyber Pakhtunkhwa, Pakistan
- Party: PTI (2013-present)
- Other political affiliations: PPP (2008)

Mujahid Ali (Urdu: مجاہد علی; born 3 April 1972) is a Pakistani politician who has been a member of the National Assembly of Pakistan since February 2024. He previously served as a member from August 2018 till January 2023 and from June 2013 to May 2018.

== Early life ==
He was born on 3 April 1972.

== Political career ==
He ran for the seat of the Provincial Assembly of Khyber Pakhtunkhwa as a candidate of Pakistan Peoples Party (PPP) from Constituency PK-25 (Mardan-III) in the 2008 Pakistani general election but was unsuccessful. He received 7,035 votes and lost the seat to a candidate of Awami National Party (ANP).

Ali was elected to the National Assembly of Pakistan as a candidate of Pakistan Tehreek-e-Insaf (PTI) from Constituency NA-11 (Mardan-III) in the 2013 Pakistani general election. He received 38,233 votes and defeated a candidate of PPP.

In 2013, he called for release of Mumtaz Qadri which created a controversy.

He was re-elected to the National Assembly as a candidate of PTI from Constituency NA-20 (Mardan-I) in the 2018 Pakistani general election. He received 78,140 votes and defeated Gul Nawaz Khan, a candidate of ANP.

He was re-elected for the 3rd consecutive term to the National Assembly as a candidate of PTI from Constituency NA-20 (Mardan-I) in the 2024 Pakistani general election.
