= Agha Shahbaz Khan Durrani =

Pakistani politician

- آغا شہباز خان درانی

Member of the Senate of Pakistan
- In office March 2015 – 25 June 2017
- President: Mamnoon Hussain
- Prime Minister: Nawaz Sharif

Personal details
- Died: 25 June 2017 Khuzdar, Balochistan, Pakistan
- Party: Pakistan Muslim League (N)

Agha Shahbaz Khan Durrani (Urdu: آغا شہباز خان درانی; died 25 June 2017) was a Pakistani politician and a member of Senate of Pakistan, affiliated with Pakistan Muslim League (N). Durrani become senator in March 2015 and would have ended his tenure in March 2021. He earned a Bachelor of Engineering from Balochistan University of Engineering and Technology Khuzdar in 2001. Agha Shahbaz Khan Durrani died due to cardiac arrest in Khuzdar on 25 June 2017.
