= Mahmood Ahmed Ghazi =

Pakistani jurist and scholar

Justice Mahmood Ahmad Ghazi

Judge of Federal Shariat Court
- In office 26 March 2010 – 25 September 2010
- Appointed by: President Asif Ali Zardari

Personal details
- Born: 13 September 1950 Kandhla, Uttar Pradesh, India
- Died: 26 September 2010 (aged 60) Islamabad

Mahmood Ahmad Ghazi (13 September 1950 – 26 September 2010) was a Pakistani jurist and scholar of Islamic Studies, shariah and fiqh. He was a professor at the International Islamic University, Islamabad, judge at the Federal Shariat Court and Federal Minister for Religious Affairs in Pakistan. He completed his dars-e-nizami at the age of 16 and later obtained a PhD in Islamic Studies from Punjab University. He was fluent in Urdu, English, Arabic, Persian, Turkish and French. He authored numerous works in Urdu and English, and translated Persian poetry Payam-e-Mashriq of Muhammad Iqbal into Arabic.

== Birth and education ==
Ghazi was born on 13 September 1950 in Kandhla, Uttar Pradesh. His father Muhammad Ahmad Farooqui was a disciple of Zakariyya Kandhlawi. He started Dars-i Nizami from Jamia Uloom-ul-Islamia, Karachi and completed the syllabus from Madrasa Ta‘lim al- Qur’ân, Rawalpindi in 1966. He obtained Master's degrees in Persian and Arabic, and in 1988 a PhD from the University of the Punjab, Lahore.

== Academic affiliations ==
1. Member, Working Committee of Al-Tajamu Al-Alami Lil Uloom Al-Muslimin, Mecca, Saudi Arabia
2. Member, Al-Ittihad Al-Alami Lil Ulama Al-Muslimin (under the patronage of Sheikh Yusuf Al-Qaradawi), Cairo, Egypt
3. Member, Arab Academy, Damascus, Syria
4. Member, Syndicate of Pir Mehr Ali Shah Arid Agriculture University, Rawalpindi, Pakistan (2006 to 2008)
5. Member, Executive Council of Allama Iqbal Open University, Islamabad (2004 to 2007)
6. Member, Board of Advanced Studies and Research of Allama Iqbal Open University, Islamabad (1991 to 1994)

== Books ==
Ghazi wrote about 30 books and more than 100 articles. His Muhaazraat Series have also been published as separate books. Muhaazraat Series are a collection of about 68 lectures, Ghazi had given at Idara al-Huda on different topics like Quran, Hadith, Fiqh, Seerat and Shariat. His other notable books include:

=== Urdu Books ===
| S# | Urdu Title | Romanized Urdu |
|---|---|---|
| 1 | ادب القاضی، اسلام آباد، ۱۹۸۳ء | Adab al-Qazi, Islamabad, 1983 |
| 2 | مسودہ قانون قصاص ودیت، اسلام آباد، ۱۹۸۶ | Maswada Qanoon Qisas-o-Diyat, Islamabad, 1986 |
| 3 | احکام بلوغت، اسلام آباد ۱۹۸۷ء | Ahkam-e-Balughat, Islamabad, 1987 |
| 4 | اسلام کا قانون بین الممالک، بہاولپور ۱۹۹۷، اسلام آباد ۲۰۰۷ | Islam ka Qanoon Bain-ul-Mamalik, Bahawalpur 1997, Islamabad 2007 |
| 5 | محاضرات قرآن، الفیصل۔ لاہور ۲۰۰۴ | Muhazirat-e-Quran, Al-Faisal. Lahore 2004 |
| 6 | محاضرات حدیث، الفیصل۔لاہور ۲۰۰۴ | Muhazirat-e-Hadith, Al-Faisal. Lahore 2004 |
| 7 | محاضرات فقہ، الفیصل۔لاہور ۲۰۰۵ | Muhazirat-e-Fiqh, Al-Faisal. Lahore 2005 |
| 8 | محاضرات سیرۃ، الفیصل۔لاہور ۲۰۰۷ | Muhazirat-e-Seerat, Al-Faisal. Lahore 2007 |
| 9 | محاضرات شریعت وتجارت، الفیصل۔لاہور ۲۰۰۹ | Muhazirat-e-Shariat-o-Tijarat, Al-Faisal. Lahore 2009 |
| 10 | اسلامی شریعت اور عصر حاضر، انسٹی ٹیوٹ آف پالیسی اسٹڈیز، اسلام آباد، ۲۰۰۹ | Islami Shariat aur Asr-e-Haazir, Institute of Policy Studies, Islamabad, 2009 |
| 11 | قرآن ایک تعارف، اسلام آباد ۲۰۰۳ | Quran: Aik Taaruf, Islamabad 2003 |
| 12 | محکمات عالم قرآنی، اسلام آباد ۲۰۰۲ | Muhkamat Alam-e-Qurani, Islamabad 2002 |
| 13 | امر بالمعروف ونہی عن المنکر، اسلام آباد ۱۹۹۲ | Amr bil Maroof wa Nahi anil Munkar, Islamabad 1992 |
| 14 | اصول الفقہ (ایک تعارف، حصہ اول ودوم)، اسلام آباد، ۲۰۰۴ | Usool al-Fiqh (Aik Taaruf, Hissa Awwal o Doyam), Islamabad, 2004 |
| 15 | قواعدفقہیہ (ایک تاریخی جائزہ، حصہ اول و دوم)، اسلام آباد ۲۰۰۴ | Qawaid Fiqhiya (Aik Tareekhi Jaiza, Hissa Awwal o Doyam), Islamabad 2004 |
| 16 | تقنین الشریعہ، اسلام آباد ۲۰۰۵ | Taqneen al-Shari'a, Islamabad 2005 |
| 17 | اسلام اور مغرب تعلقات، زوار اکیڈمی پبلی کیشنز،کراچی۔۲۰۰۹ | Islam aur Maghrib Talluqaat, Zawaar Academy Publications, Karachi. 2009 |
| 18 | مسلمانوں کا دینی و عصری نظام تعلیم، الشریعہ اکادمی، گوجرانوالہ۔۲۰۰۹ | Musalmanon ka Deeni o Asri Nizaam-e-Taleem, Al-Shari'a Academy, Gujranwala. 2009 |
| 19 | اسلامی بنکاری، ایک تعارف، زوار اکیڈمی پبلی کیشنز،کراچی۔۲۰۱۰ | Islami Banking: Aik Taaruf, Zawaar Academy Publications, Karachi. 2010 |
| 20 | فریضہ دعوت و تبلیغ، دعوۃ اکیڈمی، اسلام آباد۔۲۰۰۴ (اشاعتِ سوم) | Fariza-e-Da'wat o Tableegh, Da'wah Academy, Islamabad. 2004 (Shai'at-e-Soam) |
| 21 | اسلام اور مغرب، زوار اکیڈمی پبلی کیشنز،کراچی۔۲۰۰۷ | Islam aur Maghrib, Zawaar Academy Publications, Karachi. 2007 |

=== English books ===
Notable English works of Ghazi are:

- The Hijrah: Its Philosophy and Message for the Modern Man
- Qadianism
- The Life and Work of the Prophet of Islam (The book has been translated from the marvelous French work of Dr. Muhammad Hamidullah).
- Renaissance and Revivalism in Muslim India ― 1707-1867
- The Shorter book on Muslim International Law (Translation of al-Siyar al-Saghir of Muhammad al-Shaybani)
- An Analytical Study of the Sannusiyyah Movement of North Africa
- Islamic Renaissance in South Asia (1707-1867)―The Role of Shah Waliullah and His Successors
- State and Legislation in Islam

=== Arabic Books ===
| S# | Arabic Title | Romanized Arabic |
|---|---|---|
| 1 | تحقیق وتعلیق السیرہ الصغیرہ، امام محمد ابن حسن الشیبانی، اسلام آباد ۱۹۹۸ء | Tehqeeq wa Taleeq al-Seerah al-Saghirah, Imam Muhammad Ibn Hasan al-Shaybani, Islamabad 1998 |
| 2 | القرآن الکریم، المعجزۃ العالیۃ الکبریٰ، اسلام آباد ۱۹۹۴ء | Al-Quran al-Karim, Al-Mu'jizah al-Aliyyah al-Kubra, Islamabad 1994 |
| 3 | یا امم الشرق (ترجمہ کلام اقبال)، دسمبر ۱۹۸۶ء | Ya Ummam al-Sharq (Tarjumah Kalam-e-Iqbal), December 1986 |
| 4 | تاریخ الحرکۃ المجددیہ، بیروت ۲۰۰۹ء | Tareekh al-Harakah al-Mujaddidiyah, Beirut 2009 |
| 5 | العولمۃ، قاہرہ ۲۰۰۸ء | Al-Awlamah, Cairo 2008 |

== Death ==
On 25 August 2010 Ghazi was admitted to the CCU of PIMS. On the morning of 26 August he died of heart failure. He was buried in the H-10 graveyard in Islamabad.

== See also ==
- List of Deobandis
