= Shahzad Waseem =

Pakistani politician

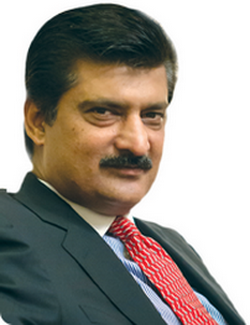

Leader of the Opposition for the Senate of Pakistan
- In office 20 April 2022 – 12 March 2024
- President: Arif Alvi
- Prime Minister: Shehbaz Sharif; Anwaar ul Haq Kakar (Caretaker)
- Preceded by: Yusuf Raza Gilani
- Succeeded by: Shibli Faraz

Leader of the House for the Senate of Pakistan
- In office 4 June 2020 – 20 April 2022
- President: Arif Alvi
- Prime Minister: Imran Khan
- Preceded by: Shibli Faraz
- Succeeded by: Azam Nazeer Tarar

Member of the Senate of Pakistan
- Incumbent
- Assumed office October 2018
- Preceded by: Chaudhry Sarwar
- Constituency: General Seat from Punjab (in vice of Chaudhry Sarwar)

Member of the Core Committee PTI
- Incumbent
- Assumed office December 2011
- Chairman: Imran Khan; Gohar Ali Khan
- Vice Chairman: Shah Mahmood Qureshi

Minister of State for Interior
- In office 2003–2006
- President: Pervez Musharraf

Member of the Senate of Pakistan
- In office 2003–2006
- Constituency: General Seat from Punjab

Personal details
- Citizenship: Pakistan
- Party: PTI (2011-present)
- Other political affiliations: PPML (2009-2011); PML(Q) (2003-2009)
- Website: www.dswpti.pk

Shahzad Waseem (Urdu: ڈاکٹر شہزاد وسیم) is a Pakistani politician who was the former Leader of the House for the Senate of Pakistan serving from 4 June 2020 to 20 April 2022. He has been a member of Senate of Pakistan from Punjab since October 2018.

== Political career ==
Waseem is the current Leader of the Opposition in the Senate of Pakistan since 20 April 2022. He was appointed as Leader of the House for Senate of Pakistan by former Prime Minister Imran Khan.He served as Leader of the House from 4 June 2020 to 20 April 2022.

Waseem has been elected to the Senate of Pakistan from Punjab on the seat vacated by Chaudhry Mohammad Sarwar representing Pakistan Tehreek-e-Insaf. The election was held on 3 October 2018 between him and Khawaja Ahmed Hassan of Pakistan Muslim League (N). Waseem secured 181 votes compared to 169 for Hassan.

He is the member of following standing committees of Senate since elected in 2018:

1. Standing Committees on Foreign Affairs.
2. Standing Committees on Interior.
3. Standing Committees on Kashmir Affairs.
4. Standing Committees on Information Technology.
5. Standing Committees on Housing and Works.

He has served as the advisor to The Chairman PTI on Diplomatic Relations. He was handling External Publicity and International Relations department within the party.

He has served as the State Minister for Interior from 2003 till 2006. As State Minister Interior, he supervised Nadra's transformation towards digital era and Machine Readable Passport initiative. Actively contributed in development of Islamabad as modern metropolis, Police Reforms and also in the management of earthquake in 2006.

He was also a Member of the Senate of Pakistan from 2003 till 2006.

From 2003 until 2006 he was serving in the following Standing Committees in the Senate:

1. Standing Committee on Establishment and Cabinet Division. (Chairman Committee)
2. Standing Committee on Women Development.
3. Standing Committee on Sports and Culture.
4. Standing Committee on Youth Affairs.
5. Standing Committee on Health.
6. Standing Committee on Interior.
