= Mushahid Ullah Khan =

Pakistani politician (1952–2021)

Minister for Climate Change
- In office 4 August 2017 – 31 May 2018
- President: Mamnoon Hussain
- Prime Minister: Shahid Khaqan Abbasi
- In office 5 January 2015 – 15 August 2015
- President: Mamnoon Hussain
- Prime Minister: Nawaz Sharif
- Succeeded by: Zahid Hamid

Member of Senate of Pakiatan
- In office 3 March 2015 – 18 February 2021
- In office 3 March 2009 – 3 March 2015

Personal details
- Born: 30 November 1952 Rawalpindi, Punjab, Pakistan
- Died: 18 February 2021 (aged 68) Islamabad, Pakistan
- Party: Pakistan Muslim League (N)
- Children: Rida Khan (daughter); Afnan Ullah Khan (son)

Mushahid Ullah Khan (Urdu: مشاہد اللہ خان) (30 November 1952 – 18 February 2021) was a Pakistani politician who served as Minister for Climate Change, in Abbasi cabinet from August 2017 to May 2018. A leader of the Pakistan Muslim League (N), Khan had been a member of the Senate of Pakistan since March 2018 and previously served as Minister for Climate Change in the third Sharif ministry in 2015. Mushahid died on 18 February 2021 after a prolonged illness.

== Early life and education ==
Khan was born in 1952 (although some sources say 1953) in Rawalpindi. His father, a Pashtun of the Yusufzai tribe who worked with the military, settled in Rawalpindi after moving from Uttar Pradesh during the 1947 partition, and Khan grew up with his four brothers and two sisters into a family which has been described by his son Afnan Ullah Khan as "devoutly religious" and which "adhered to conservative Islamic practices."

Khan did his early education at Islamia High School in Rawalpindi and completed graduation at Gordon College in Rawalpindi.

He has played professional cricket at first-class level for Rawalpindi during his youth.

He received L.L.B. degree from Urdu Law College, University of Karachi in 1997.

== Political career ==
=== Early career in Islami Jamiat-e-Talaba ===
Because both of his parents were affiliated with the Jamaat-e-Islami (JI), his mother being an influential figure in JI Rawalpindi, Khan started his political career with an influential student organization, the Islami Jamiat-e-Talaba, being active in student politics and winning several elections of JI. He eventually met Zulfikar Ali Bhutto in 1968, at the age of 15. He would then start handling public relations for a close aide of Bhutto who spotted him and saw his potential, Chaudhry Zahoor Elahi.

=== Agitation against the Zia regime ===
In 1973–74, Khan started working in Pakistan International Airlines (PIA) Ground Handling Services and became active in the workers’ union at PIA. When the Soviet Union invaded Afghanistan in 1979, Khan opposed it, perceiving there the Soviets’ war against Islam. He'd move to Karachi with his family in 1982 as PIA's largest airport was found there, but would soon lose his job at the PIA because of his activism against Zia-ul-Haq.

=== Pakistan Muslim League (N) ===
He joined Pakistan Muslim League (N) in 1990.

In 2009, Khan was elected to the Senate of Pakistan as a candidate of Pakistan Muslim League (N).

In 2015, Khan was re-elected to the Senate of Pakistan as a candidate of Pakistan Muslim League (N).

In January 2015, he was inducted into the cabinet of then Prime Minister of Pakistan Nawaz Sharif and was appointed chairman of the Benazir Income Support Programme with the status of federal minister. However he did not accept the portfolio. Hence, later he was made Minister for Climate Change.

In August 2015, he was forced to resign as the Minister for Climate Change after he, in an interview to the BBC, alleged that Zaheer-ul-Islam wanted to overthrow the civil and military leadership of Pakistan during the 2014 Azadi march.

In 2017, following the election of Shahid Khaqan Abbasi as Prime Minister of Pakistan, he was inducted into the federal cabinet of Abbasi and was appointed Minister for Climate Change for the second time. Upon the dissolution of the National Assembly on the expiration of its term on 31 May 2018, Khan ceased to hold the office as Federal Minister for Climate Change.

He had been member of Senate of Pakistan from March 2009 until his death in February 2021.

== Death ==
He died on 18 February 2021 in Islamabad Pakistan at the age of 68. He had been bedridden due to his illness.
