= Leader of the House in the Senate of Pakistan =

Pakistani constitutional position

Leader of the House for the Senate of Pakistan
- قائدِ ایوانِ بالا

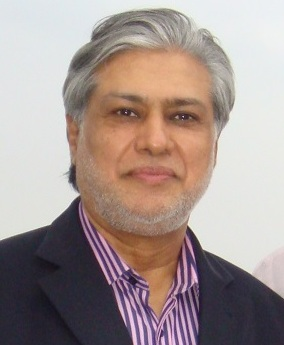
- Incumbent; Ishaq Dar since 30 September 2022
- Style: The Honourable
- Member of: Senate of Pakistan; Cabinet of Pakistan (often, though not always)
- Reports to: Prime Minister of Pakistan
- Appointer: Prime Minister of Pakistan
- Term length: 3 years
- Formation: Constitution of Pakistan (12 April 1973)
- First holder: Rao Abdus Sattar (6 August 1973)
- Website: http://www.senate.gov.pk

In Pakistani parliamentary practice, the leader of the House for the Senate of Pakistan is a party office held by a member of the governing party in the Senate of Pakistan. The leader is elected by the government parties and leads the government side in the Pakistan Senate (whether or not that party held a majority in the Senate).

The leader of the House refers to the prime minister or a member appointed by him to represent government and regulate government business in the Senate. The leader of the House represents the treasury benches, when the prime minister is not present in the house usually as the leader serves more time towards the National Assembly of Pakistan. The current leader is Ishaq Dar.

== List of the leaders for the Senate of Pakistan ==
Independent

IJI/Muslim League (N)

Muslim League (Q)

Pakistan Peoples Party

Pakistan Tehreek-e-Insaf

Name		Assumed office	Left office	Political party	Provinces
1	Rao Abdus Sattar	6 August 1973	5 August 1975	PPP	Punjab
1	Rao Abdus Sattar	6 August 1975	4 July 1977	PPP	Punjab
2		21 March 1985	20 March 1988	IND	
2		21 March 1988	12 December 1988	IND	
3		24 December 1988	20 March 1991	PPP	
4		21 March 1991	20 March 1994	IJI	
5	Aitzaz Ahsan	21 March 1994	20 March 1997	PPP	Punjab
6		21 March 1997	12 October 1999	PMLN	
7	Wasim Sajjad	23 March 2003	22 March 2006	PML(Q)	
7	Wasim Sajjad	23 March 2006	11 March 2009	PML(Q)	
8		12 March 2009	11 March 2012	PPP	
9	Aitzaz Ahsan	12 March 2012	12 March 2015	PPP	Punjab
10	Raja Zafar ul Haq	12 March 2015	25 August 2018	PMLN	Punjab
11	Shibli Faraz	26 August 2018	4 June 2020	PTI	Khyber Pakhtunkhwa
12	Shahzad Waseem	4 June 2020	20 April 2022	PTI	Punjab
13	Ishaq Dar	30 September 2022		PMLN	Punjab
