= Musakhel, Punjab =

Musakhel موسىٰ خيل
- Village and union council
- Interactive map of Musakhel
- Coordinates: 32°38′14″N 71°44′20″E
- Country: Pakistan
- Region: Punjab
- District: Mianwali District

Population
  - Total: 60,000
- Time zone: UTC+5 (PST)
- Postal code: 42200

Musakhel (Urdu: موسىٰ خيل) is a village and union council of Mianwali District in the Punjab province of Pakistan. It is part of Mianwali Tehsil.

== Demographics ==
The majority of the population belongs to Pashtun Niazi tribe. Musakhel is also the name of a Pashtun tribe of Ghilzai origin. The numerous niazi tribes[³] include Yari Khel, Khalas Khel, Maddi Khel, Baggay Khel, Sher Khel, Rami Khel, Khanjri Khel, Luqi Khel, Baahi, Dalili Khel, and Dhedi. Balochs are also present.

== Culture ==
Musakhel is known for the historic shrine of Noori Naang Sultan Sahib. Other shrines include Sheikh Torr sahib, Sir-kapp sahib, Syed Inayat Shah, Gull Baig Sahib, and Mehmood Ghazi.

== Geography ==
Musakhel borders with Namal village, Chidru, Abbakhel and Midadkhel
