= Shibli Faraz =

Pakistani politician

- شبلی فراز
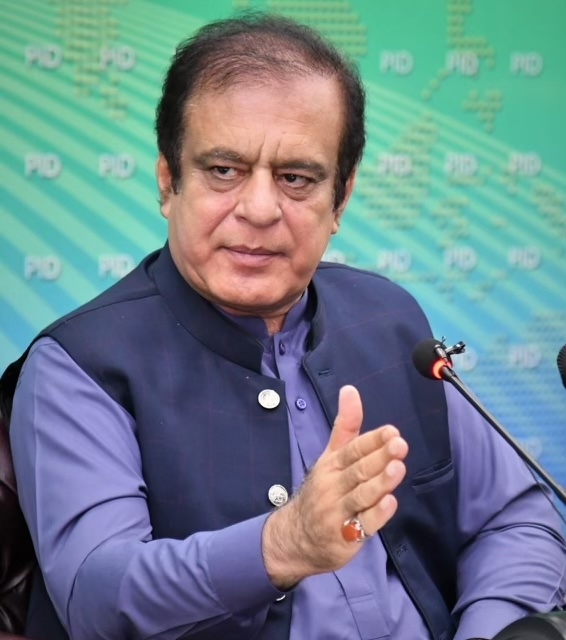

Leader of the Opposition in the Senate of Pakistan
- In office 22 April 2024 – 8 August 2025
- President: Asif Ali Zardari
- Prime Minister: Shehbaz Sharif
- Preceded by: Shahzad Waseem
- Succeeded by: Raja Nasir Abbas Jafri

Federal Minister for Science and Technology
- In office 16 April 2021 – 10 April 2022
- President: Arif Alvi
- Prime Minister: Imran Khan
- Preceded by: Fawad Chaudhry

Federal Minister for Information and Broadcasting
- In office 28 April 2020 – 2 March 2021
- President: Arif Alvi
- Prime Minister: Imran Khan
- Deputy: Asim Saleem Bajwa
- Preceded by: Firdous Ashiq Awan (as Special Assistant)
- Succeeded by: Fawad Ahmed Chaudhry

Leader of the Senate of Pakistan
- In office 26 August 2018 – 4 June 2020
- President: Mamnoon Hussain; Arif Alvi
- Prime Minister: Imran Khan
- Preceded by: Raja Zafar ul Haq
- Succeeded by: Shahzad Waseem

Member of the Senate of Pakistan
- In office 12 March 2015 – 5 August 2025
- Succeeded by: Khurram Zeeshan

Personal details
- Born: Kohat, Khyber Pakhtunkhwa, Pakistan
- Relations: Masood Kausar (uncle)
- Parent: Ahmed Faraz (father)
- Education: Cadet College Kohat
- Occupation: Politician

Syed Shibli Faraz (Urdu: سید شبلی فراز) is a Pakistani politician who served as the Leader of Opposition in Senate of Pakistan from April 2024 to August 2025. He previously served as the Minister of Science and Technology, in 2021 and 2022. He had been a member of the Senate of Pakistan from Khyber Pakhtunkhwa from 2015.

Previously, Shibli had served as the Leader of the House for the Senate of Pakistan from 26 August 2018 until 4 June 2020. He is a member of Pakistan Tehreek-e-Insaf and is the party’s head in the Senate of Pakistan.

== Early life and education ==
He was born in Kohat, Khyber Pakhtunkhwa and is the son of the late Urdu poet Ahmad Faraz. His uncle Barrister Masood Kausar had served as the Governor of Khyber Pakhtunkhwa. His family is of Pashtun background.

He completed his matriculation and intermediate from Cadet College Kohat. Later, he graduated from the Edwardes College, Peshawar, earned his LLB from the Law College, Peshawar and completed his MA in International Relations at the University de Los Andes, Colombia in 1994, while he has also been a Fellow in Finance & International Banking at the Chartered Banker Institute, London. Additionally, he holds a commercial pilot license and is fluent in English, Pashto and Spanish in addition to Urdu and Hindko.

== Professional career ==
Before entering active politics, Faraz had worked as an investment banker, and has previously served as a pilot in the Pakistan Air Force as well as a civil servant.

== Political career ==
=== Early career ===
He was elected as a Senator in March 2015 under the Pakistan Tehreek-e-Insaf in the 2015 Pakistani Senate election on a seat from Khyber Pakhtunkhwa. He also served as Chairman of the Senate Committees on Circular Debt and Commerce and Textile.

=== Leader of the House for the Senate ===
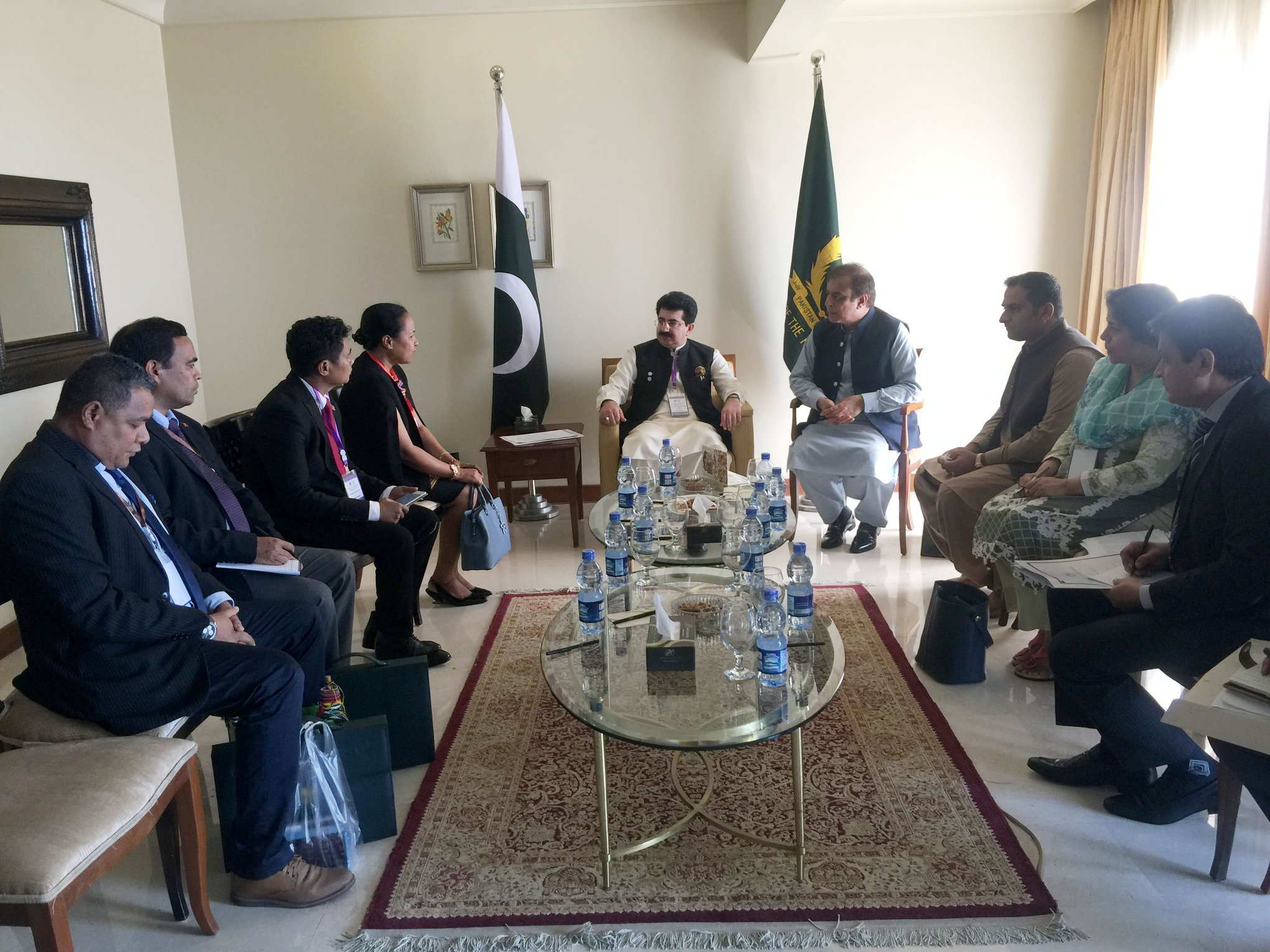
Faraz in 2018 as Leader of the House for the Senate, next to Chairman of the Senate, Sadiq Sanjrani.

In August 2018, then Prime Minister Imran Khan appointed Faraz as the Leader of the House for the Senate of Pakistan, where he served until 4 June 2020. In response to the appointment of Faraz as Leader of the House, the PML-N made Raja Zafar-ul-Haq as Opposition Leader in the Senate. While serving as Leader of the House, the Senate passed the Zainab Alert Bill, which was brought by the Imran Khan government.

=== Minister of Information & Broadcasting ===
On 27 April 2020, Imran Khan appointed Shibli as the Federal Minister for Information and Broadcasting along with General Asim Saleem Bajwa as Special Assistant to the Prime Minister for Information and Broadcasting.

As Information Minister, he gave out several statements, as he criticized Leader of the Opposition, Shehbaz Sharif for evading arrest from the National Accountability Bureau (NAB), criticized former Prime Minister Nawaz Sharif for his alleged overseas assets and money laundering and vowed that the government would bring him to Pakistan from his residence in London. He stated his support for the protection of journalism with the Journalist Protection Bill, and termed the Pakistan Democratic Movement (PDM) as a ‘group of hypocrites’.

=== Leader of Opposition for the Senate ===
He was nominated as Leader of the Opposition in the Senate or Pakistan for the Pakistan Tehreek-e-Insaf (PTI) by Imran Khan on 19 April 2024 and was endorsed by all 19 senators part of PTI. He was appointed to the position on 22 April 2024 securing the endorsement of 21 senators. PTI had boycotted the election of the Chairman of the Senate due to ongoing polls in Khyber Pakhtunkhwa. Shibli is serving as opposition leader alongside the Chairman of the Senate, Yusuf Raza Gillani and Leader of the House in the Senate, Ishaq Dar.

As opposition leader, he requested that separate seats should be allotted to the government and the opposition lawmakers and as per The News International, he stated that "Unfortunately, this illegitimate government is using Parliament as a shield merely to preserve its unjust mandate. The government does not even have a two-third majority for constitutional amendments [referring to the 26th amendment] and is trying to secure it by abducting our members." In May 2024, PTI member Sher Afzal Marwat denounced Shibli Faraz and Omar Ayub for not allowing him to meet with Imran Khan, stoking tensions within the PTI. As opposition leader, Shibli Faraz stated that India was Pakistan's enemy country, but also praised the country for its electoral process, which he stated had no frontline rigging, and asked why Pakistan could not have similar free and fair elections. He criticized the government for its 2024-25 federal budget which he declared as "anti-people".

In July 2025, an Anti-Terrorism Court in Faisalabad sentenced Shibli Faraz and several senior PTI leaders, including Omar Ayub Khan and Zartaj Gul, to 10 years in prison for alleged involvement in the May 9, 2023, protests following Imran Khan arrest. The verdict was part of a broader crackdown in which over 100 PTI workers were convicted.

The sentences have drawn criticism from human rights groups and opposition voices, who allege the trials were politically motivated and orchestrated by the Pakistan Army and ruling establishment to suppress dissent and prolong the detention of former Prime Minister Imran Khan.

In July 2025, an Anti-Terrorism Court in Faisalabad sentenced Shibli Faraz and several senior PTI leaders, including Omar Ayub Khan and Zartaj Gul, to 10 years in prison for alleged involvement in the May 9, 2023, protests following Imran Khan’s arrest. The verdict was part of a broader crackdown in which over 100 PTI workers were convicted.

The sentences have drawn criticism from human rights groups and opposition voices, who allege the trials were politically motivated and orchestrated by the Pakistan Army and ruling establishment to suppress dissent and prolong the detention of former Prime Minister Imran Khan. He has been disqualified by Election Commission of Pakistan due to his conviction in anti terrorism cases on 5 August 2025.

== 2022 helicopter incident ==
On 20 September 2022, Faraz was aboard a helicopter with Imran Khan and 2 others which was leaving Chakwal after a political rally by Khan when the pilot of the plane fell ill. Faraz, a former pilot, took over and safely landed the helicopter.

== See also ==
- Imran Khan
