= Falak Naz =

Pakistani politician

Falak Naz فلک ناز

Member of the Senate of Pakistan
- Incumbent
- Assumed office March 2021
- Constituency: Khyber Pakhtunkhwa

Personal details
- Party: PTI (2013–present)

Falak Naz (Urdu, Khowar: فلک ناز) is a Pakistani politician who is serving as a member of the Senate of Pakistan from the Khyber Pakhtunkhwa since March 2021. She belongs to Pakistan Tehreek-e-Insaf. Naz hails from the village of Rayeen in the Torkhow Valley of Lower Chitral District, Khyber Pakhtunkhwa, Pakistan.

== Career ==
She has been a Senator of the Senate of Pakistan since Mar 2021, elected from Khyber Pakhtunkhwa on a reserved seat. Naz is the first female senator of the region. She is a member of the following Senate Standing Committees: Federal Education and Professional Training (Mar 2021–Mar 2027), and Housing and Works (Mar 2021–Mar 2027).
