= Syed Muhammad Ali Shah Jamot =

Pakistani politician

- سيد محمد علي شاھ ڄاموٽ

Senate of Pakistan
- Incumbent
- Assumed office 12 March 2018

Personal details
- Party: PPP (2018-present)

Syed Muhammad Ali Shah Jamot (Sindhi: سيد محمد علي شاھ ڄاموٽ) is a Pakistani politician who has been a Member of the Senate of Pakistan, since March 2018. He is also the present chief of Jamots.

== Political career ==
Jamot was elected to the Senate of Pakistan as a candidate of Pakistan Peoples Party on general seat from Sindh in the 2018 Pakistani Senate election. He took oath as Senator on 12 March 2018.
