= Zarqa Taimur =

Pakistani politician

Member of the Senate of Pakistan
- Incumbent
- Assumed office 12 March 2021

Personal details
- Party: PTI (2010-present)

Zarqa Suharwardy Taimur is a Pakistani politician who has been a member of the Senate of Pakistan since March 2021.

She is a consultant aesthetic cosmetologist by profession. She joined PTI in 2010. She won a gold medal during her studies in Punjab University in 1989.

In July 2023, in Lahore, two clinics reportedly belonging to Pakistan Tehreek-i-Insaf Senator Dr. Zarqa Taimur were sealed by the Punjab government. The action came shortly after she protested against derogatory remarks made by PML-N leader Khawaja Muhammad Asif, who referred to women senators in a disrespectful manner during a joint session of the parliament in Islamabad.

According to an official privy to the matter, primary and secondary healthcare department secretary Ali Jan allegedly instructed district health officers to take punitive measures against Dr. Zarqa by sealing her clinics. Health teams were promptly dispatched to her clinics in Gulberg and Defence Housing Authority to carry out the task, with the higher health officers being kept informed.

The raiding of Dr. Zarqa's clinics was questioned as it falls under the jurisdiction of the Punjab Healthcare Commission (PHC) to check for any medical protocol violations. However, PHC authorities denied any involvement in the sealing of the clinics.

The district health authority claimed that the raids were conducted in response to complaints of violations of anti-dengue regulations by the staff at Dr. Zarqa's clinic. They allegedly found dengue larvae on the premises and noted that the clinic was operated by non-qualified staff, mainly comprising individuals with intermediate qualifications. The staff also reportedly failed to produce the registration letter from the PHC. As a result, the team sealed the clinic and submitted an application to the local police to initiate legal action under the anti-dengue regulations.

In response to the incident, Senator Dr. Zarqa Taimur accused the Punjab government of victimizing her for raising her voice against the insulting campaigns directed at women parliamentarians. She claimed that the health teams raided her clinics illegally and sealed them.

The primary and secondary healthcare minister and the secretary did not respond to the reporter's attempts to reach them for comment.
