= Abdul Latif Yousafzai =

Pakistani lawyer

Abdul Latif Yousafzai was a Supreme Court lawyer of Pakistan, who served as Advisor to the National Assembly of Pakistan from 2019 to 2022. Yousafzai previously served as the Advocate General of Khyber Pakhtunkhwa as well as Chairman Khyber Pakhtunkhwa Bar Council from 2013 to 2019. Prior to that, he served as member of the Privatization Commission of Pakistan from 2008 until 2010 and as a member of the Alternate Dispute Resolution Committee for Federal Board of Revenue of Pakistan. He also served as the prosecutor general of National Accountability Bureau from 1999 to 2001. He was the Deputy Attorney General of Pakistan between October 1992 and 1995.

He started his legal career in 1974 and served between 1986 and 1991 as the special prosecutor of the anti-narcotics cases and legal advisor to the Customs and Income Tax departments. He served as Secretary Supreme Court Bar Association of Pakistan and was elected four times as member Executive of the Supreme Court Bar Association. He also served as the vice-president Supreme Court Bar Association of Pakistan from 2003 to 2005. Yousafzai was a candidate to the Senate of Pakistan from Pakistan Tehreek-e-Insaf.
