= Arbab Umar Farooq =

Pakistani politician

Member of the Senate of Pakistan
- Incumbent
- Assumed office 12 March 2021
- Constituency: Balochistan

Personal details
- Party: PMLN (2025-present)
- Other political affiliations: ANP (2021-2025)

Nawab Arbab Umar Farooq Kasi is a Pakistani politician from Balochistan who is currently serving as a member of the Senate of Pakistan since March 2021. He belongs to Awami National Party (ANP).
