= Saifullah Abro =

Pakistani politician

Member of the Senate of Pakistan
- In office 12 March 2021 – 10 November 2025
- Constituency: Sindh

Personal details
- Party: MQM-P (2025–present)
- Other political affiliations: PTI (2021–2025)

Saifullah Abro is a Pakistani politician hailing from Larkana who was serving as a member of the Senate of Pakistan from the Sindh province from 12 March 2021 until 10 November 2025. He was a member of the Pakistan Tehreek-e-Insaf until he went against party lines and voted in favour of 27th Amendment.
