= Khalida Ateeb =

Pakistani politician

Member of the Senate of Pakistan
- Incumbent
- Assumed office March 2021
- Constituency: Sindh

Personal details
- Party: MQM-P (2021-present)

Khalida Ateeb (Sindhi: خالدہ اطیب) is a Pakistani politician who is currently serving as a member of the Senate of Pakistan from the Sindh since March 2021. She belongs to Muttahida Qaumi Movement – Pakistan. She started her political career with MQM in 1987 and served on different key positions within MQM. She is a registered lawyer and has done Masters in Political Sciences from University of Karachi.
