= Mohsin Aziz =

Pakistani politician

Senate of Pakistan
- Incumbent
- Assumed office March 2015

Personal details
- Party: PTI (2015–present)

Mohsin Aziz (Urdu: محسن عزیز) is a Pakistani politician and a member of Senate of Pakistan, representing PTI.

== Political career ==
He was elected to the Senate of Pakistan as a candidate of Pakistan Tehreek-e-Insaf in the 2015 Pakistani Senate election.
