= Palwasha Khan =

Pakistani politician

Palwasha Khan پلوشہ خان

Senator (Upper House of Pakistan) Government of Pakistan

Member of the National Assembly of Pakistan

Personal details
- Party: PPP (2008-present)

Palwasha Khan (Note: or Palwasha Mohammadzai Khan) (Urdu: پلوشہ خان) is a Pakistani politician who is a Senator and served as a member of the National Assembly of Pakistan.

She was elected as Senator Government of Pakistan in March 2021

== Political career ==
She was elected to the National Assembly of Pakistan from Punjab as a candidate of Pakistan Peoples Party (PPP) on a seat reserved for women in the 2008 Pakistani general election.

On 4 November 2018, she was appointed as deputy information secretary of PPP by Bilawal Bhutto Zardari.

On 3 March 2021, she was elected as Senator (Upper House of Pakistan) of Pakistan for 6 years term.
