= Zeeshan Khanzada =

Pakistani politician

Member of the Senate of Pakistan
- Incumbent
- Assumed office March 2021

Personal details
- Party: PTI (2021-present)

Zeeshan Khanzada (Pashto: ذیشان خانزادہ) is a Pakistani politician who serves as a member of the Senate of Pakistan from the Khyber Pakhtunkhwa since March 2021. He previously served in this position from January 2020 to March 2021. He belongs to Pakistan Tehreek-e-Insaf. Khanzada is from Sheikh Maltoon Town, Mardan District.
