= NA-255 Sohbat Pur-cum-Jaffarabad-cum-Usta Muhammad-cum-Nasirabad =

Constituency of the National Assembly of Pakistan

NA-255 Sohbat Pur-cum-Jaffarabad-cum-Usta Muhammad
- Constituency for the National Assembly of Pakistan
- Region: Sohbatpur District; Jafarabad District; Usta Muhammad District; Nasirabad District (partly)
- Electorate: 310,782

Current constituency
- Created: 2022
- Party: Pakistan Muslim League (N)
- Member: Mir Khan Muhammad Jamali
- Created from: NA-261

NA-255 Sohbat Pur-cum-Jaffarabad-cum Usta Muhammad-cum-Nasirabad (این اے-255، صحبت پور-کم-جعفر آباد-کم-اوستا محمد-کم-نصیر آباد) is a constituency of the National Assembly of Pakistan, comprising Jafarabad, Sohbatpur, and Usta Muhammad from the province of Balochistan. The constituency was formerly known as NA-261. In the 2018 Elections, Nasirabad was removed from it to form the current constituency.

== Assembly segments ==
Constituency number	Constituency	District	Current MPA	Party
15	PB-15 Sohbatpur	Sohbatpur	Saleem Ahmed	PML(N)
16	PB-16 Jafarabad	Jafarabad	Abdul Majeed	JIP
17	PB-17 Usta Muhammad	Usta Muhammad	Faisal Khan Jamali	PPP

== Members of Parliament ==
=== 2018–2023: NA-261 Jafarabad-cum-Sohbatpur ===
Election	Member	Party
2018	Mir Khan Muhammad Jamali	PTI

=== 2024–present: NA-255 Sohbat Pur-cum-Jaffarabad-cum-Usta Muhammad-cum-Nasirabad ===
Election	Member	Party
2024	Mir Khan Muhammad Jamali	PML(N)

== Election 2018 ==
General elections were scheduled to be held on 25 July 2018.

General election 2018: NA-261 Jafarabad-cum-Sohbatpur
Party	Candidate	Votes	%	±%
PTI	Mir Khan Muhammad Jamali	45,222	40.89	
PPP	Mir Changez Khan Jamali	27,563	24.92	
BAP	Zahoor Hussain Khan	22,284	20.15	
Others	Others (seven candidates)	15,524	14.04	
Turnout		120,848	38.89	
Total valid votes		110,593	91.51	
Rejected ballots		10,255	8.49	
Majority		17,659	14.61	
Registered electors		310,782		
PTI gain from N/A				

== Election 2024 ==
General elections were held on 8 February 2024. Mir Khan Muhammad Jamali won the election with 45,404 votes.

General election 2024: NA-255 Sohbat Pur-cum-Jaffarabad-cum-Usta Muhammad-cum-Nasirabad
Party	Candidate	Votes	%	±%
PML(N)	Mir Khan Muhammad Jamali	45,404	24.85	N/A
PPP	Mir Changez Khan Jamali	39,398	21.56	▼3.36
Independent	Javed Jamali	23,415	12.82	N/A
Independent	Nisar Ahmed	18,367	10.05	N/A
PTI	Muhammad Arif Murad (Note: Filed nomination papers as PTI candidate but ECP allowed him to run as an Independent)	13,492	7.38	▼33.51
JI	Muhammad Rafiq	10,340	5.66	N/A
Others	Others (forty candidates)	32,288	17.67	
Turnout		199,178	37.40	▼1.49
Total valid votes		182,704	91.73	
Rejected ballots		16,474	8.27	
Majority		6,006	3.29	
Registered electors		532,537		
PML(N) gain from PTI				

== See also ==
- NA-254 Nasirabad-cum-Kachhi-cum-Jhal Magsi
- NA-256 Khuzdar
