= Nasirabad Division =

Administrative division of Balochistan, Pakistan

Coordinates: 28°57′N 67°31′E

Naseerabad Division نصیرآباد ڈویژن نصیرآباد ولایت بخش نصیرآباد
- Division
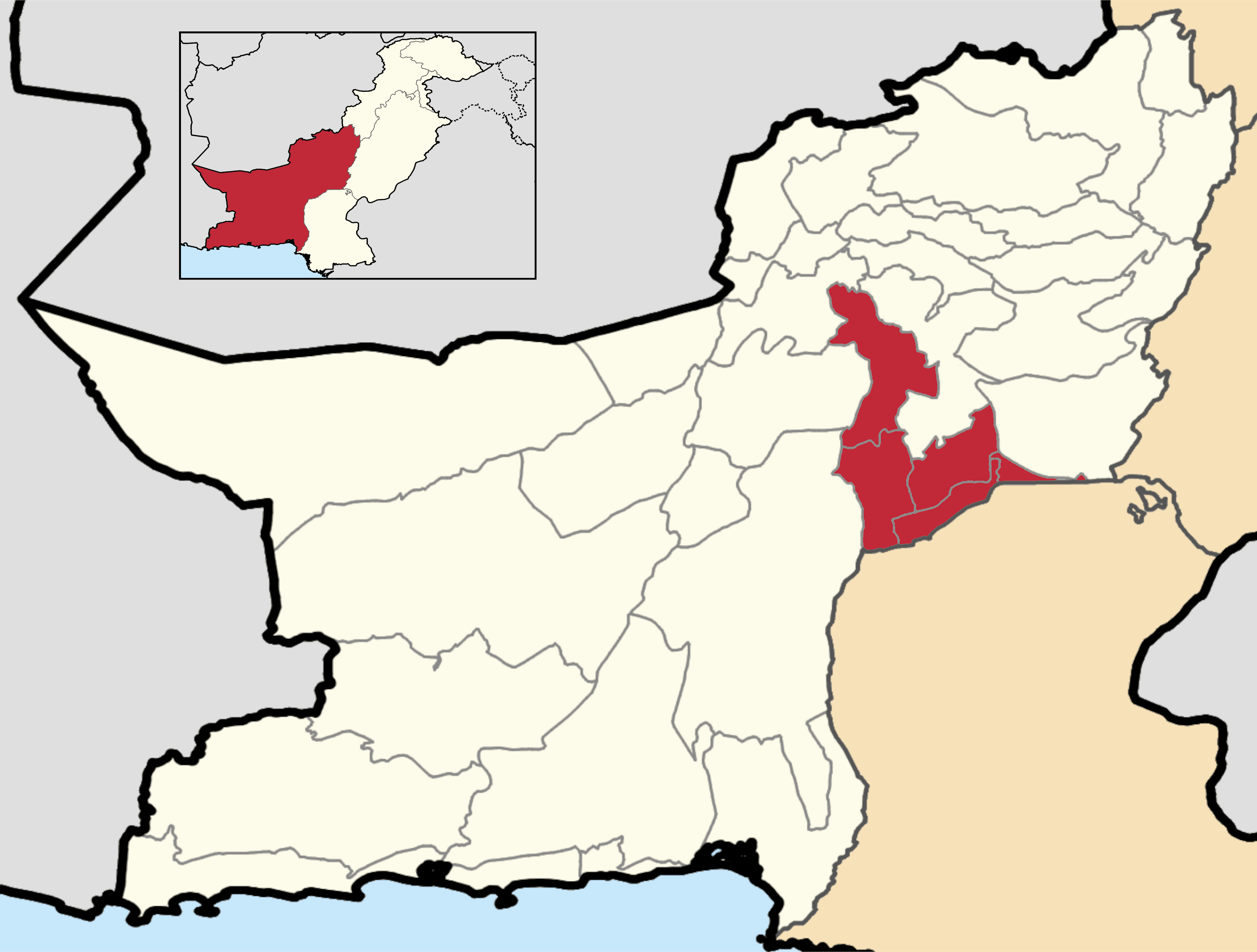
- Map of Naseerabad Division
- Country: Pakistan
- Province: Balochistan
- Capital: Dera Murad Jamali
- Established: 1987; 39 years ago

Government
  - Type: Divisional Administration
  - Commissioner: Moin Ur Rehman Khan (BPS-20 BCS)
  - Regional Police Officer: Muhammad Saleem Lehri (BPS-20 PSP)
  - Constituensy: NA-254 Nasirabad-cum-Kachhi-cum-Jhal Magsi; NA-255 Sohbat Pur-cum-Jaffarabad-cum-Usta Muhammad-cum-Nasirabad

Population (2023)
  - Division: 2,044,021
  - Urban: 389,655 (19.06%)
  - Rural: 1,654,366 (80.94%)

Ethnicities
  - People: Largest: Balochs (55.18%); Others: Brahvis (13.14%)

Literacy
  - Literacy rate: Total: (32.59%); Male: (40.72%); Female: (24.06%)
- Time zone: UTC+05:00 (PKT)
  - Summer (DST): DST is not observed
- ZIP Code: 80700
- NWD (area) code: 0838
- ISO 3166 code: PK-BA

Naseerabad Division (Urdu: نصیر آباد ڈویژن) is an administrative division of Balochistan Province, Pakistan. It is the only Irrigation & Agricultural Division of Balochistan. The division connects Balochistan with Sindh. Naseerabad division was created by bifurcation of Sibi division in 1987. Its Divisional headquarters are at Dera Murad Jamali. CNIC Code of Naseerabad Division is 53. According to 2023 Pakistani census population of Nasirabad Division is 2,044,021.

== List of the Districts ==
#	District	Headquarter	Area (km²)	Pop. (2023)	Density (ppl/km²) (2023)	Lit. rate (2023)
1	Sohbatpur	Sohbatpur	802	240,106	299.6	41.02%
2	Nasirabad	Dera Murad Jamali	3,387	563,315	166.1	28.96%
3	Usta Muhammad	Usta Muhammad	953	N/A	280	35.53%
4	Jafarabad	Dera Allahyar	1,643	594,558	361.1	35.53 %
5	Jhal Magsi	Gandava	3,615	203,368	56.2	30.14%

== List of the Tehsils ==
Tehsil	Area (km²)	Pop. (2023)	Density (ppl/km²) (2023)	Literacy rate (2023)	Districts
Jaffarabad Tehsil	...	...	...	...	Jafarabad
Jhatpat Tehsil	690	302,498	438.40	36.70%	Jafarabad
Gandavah Tehsil	1,344	71,230	53.00	36.35%	Jhal Magsi
Jhal Magsi Tehsil	1,679	116,528	69.40	26.82%	Jhal Magsi
Mirpur Tehsil	592	15,610	26.37	24.86%	Jhal Magsi
Faridabad Tehsil	137	68,948	503.27	41.09%	Sohbatpur
Hayrvi Tehsil	73	16,891	231.38	42.60%	Sohbatpur
Manjipur Tehsil	82	23,624	288.10	43.85%	Sohbatpur
Saeed Muhammad Kanrani Tehsil	77	18,175	236.04	45.90%	Sohbatpur
Panhwar Tehsil	99	47,624	481.05	35.38%	Sohbatpur
Sohbatpur Tehsil	334	64,844	194.14	42.30%	Sohbatpur
Baba Kot Tehsil	967	53,661	55.49	15.41%	Nasirabad
Dera Murad Jamali	281	265,822	945.99	34.93%	Nasirabad
Landhi Tehsil	266	8,638	32.47	17.60%	Nasirabad
Chattar Tehsil	961	32,276	33.59	17.21%	Nasirabad
Meer Hassan Tehsil	229	53,400	233.19	22.99%	Nasirabad
Tamboo Tehsil	683	149,518	218.91	28.80%	Nasirabad
Usta Muhammad Tehsil	399	210,870	528.50	38.17%	Usta Muhammad
Gandakha Tehsil	554	81,190	146.55	24.59%	Usta Muhammad

== Constituencies ==
#	Provincial Assembly Constituency	National Assembly Constituency	District
1	PB-11 Jhal Magsi	NA-254 Nasirabad-cum-Kachhi-cum-Jhal Magsi	Jhal Magsi
2	PB-12 Kachhi	NA-254 Nasirabad-cum-Kachhi-cum-Jhal Magsi	Kachhi
3	PB-13 Nasirabad-I	NA-254 Nasirabad-cum-Kachhi-cum-Jhal Magsi	Nasirabad
4	PB-14 Nasirabad-II	NA-254 Nasirabad-cum-Kachhi-cum-Jhal Magsi	Nasirabad
5	PB-15 Sohbatpur	NA-255 Sohbat Pur-cum-Jaffarabad-cum-Usta Muhammad-cum-Nasirabad	Sohbatpur
6	PB-16 Jafarabad	NA-255 Sohbat Pur-cum-Jaffarabad-cum-Usta Muhammad-cum-Nasirabad	Jafarabad
7	PB-17 Usta Muhammad	NA-255 Sohbat Pur-cum-Jaffarabad-cum-Usta Muhammad-cum-Nasirabad	Usta Muhammad

== Demographics ==
=== Population ===
Historical population
Year	Pop.	±% p.a.
1951	...	—
1961	...	—
1972	...	—
1981	699,669	—
1998	1,076,708	+2.57%
2017	1,661,077	+2.31%
2023	2,044,021	+3.52%

As per the 2023 Census of Pakistan, the division has a population of about 2,044,021 roughly equal to the country of Slovenia or the US state of Nebraska. The literacy rate of Nasirabad Division is approximately 32.59%, with 40.72% for males and 24.06% for females, highlighting a significant gender disparity.

=== Language ===
Languages of Nasirabad Division (2023)
1. Balochi (55.2%)
2. Sindhi (18.8%)
3. Brahui (13.1%)
4. Saraiki (11.8%)
5. Urdu (0.21%)
6. Others (0.89%)

The major languages spoken in the region are Balochi (55.2%), Sindhi (18.8%), Brahui (13.1%), Saraiki (11.8%), Urdu (0.21%) and (0.89%) others . Balochi is the most widely spoken, particularly in rural areas, while Sindhi and Saraiki are more common in the southern and eastern parts of the division. The presence of multiple languages reflects the cultural and ethnic diversity of the region.

== See also ==
- Districts of Pakistan
  - Districts of Balochistan
- Tehsils of Pakistan
  - Tehsils of Balochistan
- Divisions of Pakistan
  - Divisions of Balochistan
  - Divisions of Khyber Pakhtunkhwa
  - Divisions of Punjab
  - Divisions of Sindh
  - Divisions of Azad Kashmir
  - Divisions of Gilgit-Baltistan
