= Umar Khan Jamali =

Pakistani politician

Member of the Provincial Assembly of the Balochistan
- In office 13 August 2018 – 12 August 2023
- Constituency: PB-13 Jafarabad-I

Personal details
- Party: AP (2025-present)
- Other political affiliations: PMLN (2023-2025); PTI (2018-2023)
- Relations: Rahat Jamali (cousin); Zafarullah Khan Jamali (father); Taj Muhammad Jamali (uncle); Mir Khan Muhammad Jamali (uncle); A.R. Jamali (uncle); Jafar Khan Jamali (grand uncle); Jan Muhammad Jamali (cousin)
- Parent: Zafarullah Khan Jamali (father)

Umar Khan Jamali is a Pakistani politician who had been a member of the Provincial Assembly of Balochistan from August 2018 to August 2023.

On 8 October 2018, he was inducted into the provincial Balochistan cabinet of Chief Minister Jam Kamal Khan.
