= Kacchi Plain =

Area in Balochistan, Pakistan

Coordinates: 28.5333°N 67.5333°E

The Kacchi Plains (Sindhi: ڪچي ميدان, Balochi: کَچِّ سَتَیْ زَمِیمْ), also known as Kach Gandava, is a low-lying flat region in Balochistan, Pakistan separating the Bugti hills from those of Kalat, covering an area of 8,000 km^{2} (3,100 sq mi). The addition of the latter "Gandava" is based on the name of the town of Gandava in the present-day Balochistan, Pakistan.

Kach Gandava is driven, like a wedge, into the frontier mountain system and extends for 241 kilometers from Jacobabad to Sibi, with nearly as great a breadth at its base on the Sindh frontier. The soil is fertile wherever it can be irrigated by the floods brought down from the surrounding hills; but much of the central portion is sandy waste.

== History ==
The Kachhi Plain is the home of the archeological site of Mehrgarh, one of the most important Neolithic sites in archaeology, in the Kachhi district of Pakistan.

Until the end of the 15th century Kacchi had been part of Sindh. Around 1500, it was taken by Shah Beg of the Arghun dynasty from the Samma dynasty of Sindh. The territory was conquered by the Kalhora amirs of Sindh; they were displaced by the Nadir Shah of Persia and awarded by him to the Kalat Khanate in 1740. Kachhi was notified as a district in February 1965. At that time Naseerabad, Jhal Magsi, Jafarabad, Usta Muhammad and Sohbatpur districts were included; these were separated in 1987. Kacchi plains are also the site of Kacchi Canal Project.

== Geography ==
=== Plain ===
The Kacchi Plain is an arid plain with mountain ranges on three sides except to the southeast, located in:

- the Kachhi District
- the southern part of Sibi District, extending into the Nasirabad Division

=== Districts ===
Kachhi, Sibi, Nasirabad, Jafarabad, Jhal Magsi, Usta Muhammad, Sohbatpur districts of Balochistan.

== See also ==
- Kacchi (Kalat)
- Kachhi (Punjab)
