= Literacy in Pakistan =

Literacy Rate in each Pakistani District as of the 2017 Pakistan Census

Literacy in Pakistan is a key for social-economic progress. The literacy rate in Pakistan has seen gradual improvement over the past few decades, but it remains a significant challenge. According to recent data, the overall literacy rate in Pakistan is estimated to be around 62-68%, with notable gender disparities. The literacy rate for males at 73-80% is generally higher than that for females 52-60%, particularly in rural areas, where access to education is more limited. Several factors contribute to low literacy rates, including poverty, cultural barriers, inadequate infrastructure, and a lack of quality education in certain regions. Efforts to improve literacy have been made through various government and NGO initiatives, but achieving universal literacy remains a long-term goal. Enhancing educational opportunities, especially for girls, and addressing regional disparities are crucial steps toward improving Pakistan's literacy rate.

== Literacy rate by Census ==
The definition of literacy has been undergoing changes, with the result that the literacy figure has vacillated irregularly during the various censuses. A summary is as follows:

Year of census	Total	Male	Female	Urban	Rural	Definition of being "literate"	Age group
1951 (West Pakistan)	17.9%	21.4%	13.9%	N/A	N/A	One who can read a clear print in any language	All Ages
1961 (West Pakistan)	16.9%	26.1%	6.7%	34.8%	10.6%	One who is able to read with understanding a simple letter in any language	Age 5 and above
1972	21.7%	30.2%	11.6%	41.5%	14.3%	One who is able to read and write in some language with understanding	Age 10 and Above
1981	26.2%	35.1%	16.0%	47.1%	17.3%	One who can read newspaper and write a simple letter	Age 10 and Above
1998	43.92%	54.81%	32.02%	63.08%	33.64%	One who can read a newspaper and write a simple letter, in any language	Age 10 and Above
2021	62.8%	68%	52.84%	74.09%	51.56%		Age 10 and Above

== Literacy rate by Province and Federally Administered Areas ==
Province	Literacy rate				
Province	1972	1981	1998	2021	2023
Punjab	20.7%	27.4%	46.56%	66.3%	70.5%
Sindh	30.2%	31.5%	45.29%	61.8%	65.4%
Khyber Pakhtunkhwa	15.5%	16.7%	35.41%	55.1%	59.05%
Balochistan	10.1%	10.3%	26.6%	54.5%	58.7%
Islamabad (ICT)	...	47.8%	72.40%	...	96%
Azad Jammu & Kashmir (AJK)	...	25.7%	55%	...	91.88% (2021)
Gilgit-Baltistan	...	3%	37.85%	...	N/A

== Literacy rate by Districts ==
District	2023	2017	1998	1981	1972
Muzaffarabad	...				
Hattian Bala	...				
Neelum	...				
Mirpur	...				
Bhimber	...				
Kotli	...				
Poonch	...				
Bagh	...				
Haveli	...				
Sudhnati	...				
Ghanche	...				
Skardu	...				
Astore	...				
Diamer	...				
Ghizer	...				
Gilgit	...				
Hunza	...				
Kharmang	...				
Shigar	...				
Nagar	...				
Abbottabad	87.34%				
Allai	...				
Bajaur	36.26%				
Bannu	51.75%				
Battagram	49.09%				
Buner	53.75%				
Charsadda	63.94%				
Central Dir District	...				
Dera Ismail Khan	56.58%				
Hangu	53.15%				
Haripur	84.88%				
Karak	75.36%				
Khyber	48.45%				
Kohat	68.55%				
Kolai Palas	28.80%				
Kurram	45.22%				
Lakki Marwat	58.47%				
Lower Chitral	76.10%				
Lower Dir	67.36%				
Lower Kohistan	32.05%				
Malakand	...				
Mansehra	73.79%				
Mardan	65.79%				
Mohmand	41.28%				
North Waziristan	42.82%				
Nowshera	66.78%				
Orakzai	43.57%				
Peshawar	63.28%				
Shangla	43.74%				
Upper South Waziristan	41.96%				
Lower South Waziristan	41.96%				
Swabi	68.48%				
Swat	58.13%				
Tank	50.67%				
Torghar	39.74%				
Upper Chitral	83.83%				
Upper Dir	56.77%				
Upper Kohistan	29.05%				
Badin	46.65%				
Dadu	57.13%				
Ghotki	51.38%				
Hyderabad	77.21%				
Jacobabad	52.34%				
Jamshoro	59.63%				
Karachi Central	93.55%				
Karachi East	90.07%				
Karachi South	88.57%				
Karachi West	77.43%				
Kashmore	45.59%				
Keamari	72.07%				
Khairpur	60.14%				
Korangi	89.86%				
Larkana	65.58%				
Malir	73.14%				
Matiari	55.88%				
Mirpur Khas	55.37%				
Naushahro Feroze	67.15%				
Qambar Shahdadkot	50.02%				
Sanghar	53.66%				
Shaheed Benazirabad	60.86%				
Shikarpur	53.70%				
Sujawal	37.02%				
Sukkur	68.26%				
Tando Allahyar	49.80%				
Tando Muhammad Khan	44.02%				
Tharparkar	46.39%				
Thatta	36.88%				
Umerkot	48.69%				
Awaran	46.34%				
Barkhan	43.62%				
Chagai	43.15%				
Chaman	49.97%				
Dera Bugti	34.07%				
Duki	54.18%				
Gwadar	60.30%				
Harnai	49.83%				
Hub	46.47%				
Jafarabad	45.53 %				
Jhal Magsi	40.14%				
Kachhi	40.20%				
Kalat	49.70%				
Kech	59.65%				
Kharan	51.07%				
Khuzdar	48.59%				
Kohlu	38.53%				
Lasbela	46.47%				
Loralai	53.16%				
Mastung	55.97%				
Musakhel	46.60%				
Nasirabad	38.96%				
Nushki	67.12%				
Panjgur	52.07%				
Pishin	61.07%				
Quetta	66.29%				
Qila Abdullah	46.40%				
Qilla Saifullah	42.96%				
Sherani	33.86%				
Sibi	57.41%				
Sohbatpur	51.02%				
Surab	47.44%				
Washuk	31.58%				
Zhob	46.62%				
Ziarat	53.37%				
Usta Muhammad	45.53%				
Attock	80.22%				
Bahawalnagar	67.01%				
Bahawalpur	63.35%				
Bhakkar	65.68%				
Chakwal	87.79%				
Chiniot	65.05%				
Dera Ghazi Khan	56.78				
Faisalabad	83.41%				
Gujranwala	86.77%				
Gujrat	88.37%				
Hafizabad	75.77%				
Jhang	69.45%				
Jhelum	85.65%				
Kasur	72.85%				
Khanewal	70.97%				
Khushab	72.52%				
Lahore	89.62%				
Layyah	71.83%				
Lodhran	61.68%				
Mandi Bahauddin	80.27%				
Mianwali	72.87%				
Multan	71.41%				
Muzaffargarh	57.99%				
Nankana Sahib	73.12%				
Narowal	85.28%				
Okara	70.25%				
Pakpattan	67.13%				
Rahim Yar Khan	57.94%				
Rajanpur	46.09%				
Rawalpindi	89.22%				
Sahiwal	74.77%				
Sargodha	76.73%				
Sheikhupura	78.88%				
Sialkot	88.37%				
Toba Tek Singh	81.38%				
Vehari	69.10%				
Talagang	...				
Murree	...				
Taunsa	...				
Kot Addu	...				
Wazirabad	...				
Islamabad Capital Territory	95%				

=== Mean Years of Schooling in Pakistan by administrative unit ===
Unit	1990	1995	2000	2005	2010	2012	2015	2018
Azad Jammu & Kashmir	3.78	4.59 ▲	5.42 ▲	7.47 ▲	7.22 ▼	7.35 ▼	6.92 ▼	6.51 ▼
Balochistan	1.77	2.15 ▲	2.53 ▲	3.49 ▲	3.25 ▼	3.14 ▼	3.17 ▼	3.10 ▼
FATA	1.42	1.73 ▲	2.04 ▲	2.81 ▲	2.71 ▼	2.69 ▼	2.60 ▼	2.45 ▼
Gilgit-Baltistan	2.01	2.44 ▲	2.88 ▲	3.97 ▲	3.84 ▼	3.80 ▼	4.59 ▲	5.17 ▲
Islamabad (ICT)	4.16	5.05 ▲	5.96 ▲	8.21 ▲	9.67 ▲	10.70 ▲	9.62 ▼	8.34 ▼
Khyber Pakhtunkhwa	1.83	2.22 ▲	2.62 ▲	3.62 ▲	3.80 ▲	3.97 ▲	3.95 ▼	3.82 ▼
Punjab	1.96	2.38 ▲	2.81 ▲	3.88 ▲	4.44 ▲	4.85 ▲	5.23 ▲	5.41 ▲
Sindh	2.43	2.95 ▲	3.48 ▲	4.79 ▲	5.19 ▲	5.51 ▲	5.35 ▼	5.05 ▼
Pakistan	2.28	2.77 ▲	3.27 ▲	4.51 ▲	4.68 ▲	4.85 ▲	5.09 ▲	5.16 ▲

=== Literacy rates and development ===
Pakistan literacy rate is lower than other neighbours of it in South Asia at 63 percent. The second lowest in South Asia after Afghanistan which has 37% The male literacy rate is 73 percent and the female literacy rate is 54 percent. The female literacy rate drops to twenty-five percent in rural areas of Pakistan including Waziristan and Tharparkur . Girls' school enrollment also significantly drops in the rural areas of Pakistan. The enrollment rate for girls in rural areas is only twenty percent in grade school. Sixty-five percent of Pakistan's population is made up of rural citizens. Citizens in Pakistan face issues that affect their quality of life. Issues such as illiteracy are linked to poverty and lack of basic needs. Feudalism and patriarchy leadership has kept females especially from receiving adequate education.

Parents with lower literacy skills struggle to understand health recommendations that can affect the development of their children. Malnutrition is a problem for children of parents who do not have a formal education status. Uneducated parents may not know the necessary proper nutrition needed for their children to adequately grow and develop. Malnutrition is associated with mothers who are illiterate and unaware of correct feeding practices. There are several factors that contribute to the low education levels in Pakistan. Among the primary catalysts are unemployment, poverty, lack of awareness, teachers' absenteeism, a scarcity of quality educational institutions, and insufficient government oversight of educational institutions.

In a study published by the Research Journal of Commerce, Economics, and Social Sciences, discusses the importance of education. The study compares Indonesia, Malaysia and Pakistan. Education plays a huge role and is a crucial tool for overall improvement in well-being. Education helps jobs, upholds social justice and equity, social and self-awareness, and open mindedness. Education is one of the most important contribution a country can offer its citizens in the hopes of inequality and poverty. Education has a very positive effect on human life. In any society education plays such a basic role and without education we cannot imagine a life. This study found that there are many differences in culture in Indonesia, Malaysia and Pakistan as well as resources within the country are also very different. The data reveals that the literacy rate of Indonesia is 90%, Malaysia is 89% and Pakistan is 62.8%, which is significantly lower in compared to the other two countries. In comparison to these other two countries, Pakistan has the more poverty and inequality within its country. It only makes sense that it has the lowest literacy rate because of this. If Pakistan's literacy rates were to go up, their poverty and inequality within their country would hopefully go down, creating a better society and more beneficial country.

== See also ==
- Muhammad Iqbal's educational philosophy
- List of administrative units of Pakistan by Human Development Index
- List of special education institutions in Pakistan
- Lists of educational institutions in Pakistan
- Right to Education Pakistan
