= Zahoor Hussain Khosa =

Pakistani politician (died 2023)

Speaker of the Balochistan Assembly
- In office 31 May 1990 – 17 November 1990

Member of National Assembly of Pakistan
- In office ?–?
- Constituency: PP26

Personal details
- Died: 23 April 2023 Karachi, Pakistan
- Party: Balochistan National Party

Zahoor Hussain Khosa (Urdu: ظہور حسین کھوسہ; died 23 April 2023) was a Pakistani politician who was the speaker of the Balochistan Assembly from 31 May 1990 to 17 November 1990, as well as being leader of the Khosa tribe. He also served as an MPA in Balochistan for PP26. He was affiliated with the Balochistan National Party, and a political rival of the former Prime Minister Mir Zafarullah Khan Jamali.

In 2005, Zahoor helped negotiate a political truce between his tribe and the Jamali family in Jaffarabad district, having shook hands for the first time in four decades and deciding to "cooperate for the betterment of the people of the area".

In 2008, Khosa contested the general election as an independent candidate and was elected MPA from Dera Allah Yar. Later, he joined the Pakistan Muslim League-Nawaz.

Zahoor was a major supporter of the NCHD projects in Balochistan in 2009, and called on the federal government to continue the projects launched by the National Commission for Human Development in Balochistan and release funds for them.

In 2010, Zahoor was disqualified as an MPA of Balochistan assembly from PB-26 Jaffarabad-II for falsifying his academic degree; the Supreme Court of Pakistan ordered the election commission to take strict action against him. In August 2012, he was sentenced to two years in prison and fined Rs.5,000 for possessing a fake degree by the District and Sessions Court.

== Personal life and death ==
Zahoor was the elder brother of Manzoor Ahmad Khosa, a well-known tribal figure, and the uncle of former provincial ministers Izhar Khan Khosa and Salim Khan Khosa.

Zahoor died on 23 April 2023 after suffering from lung cancer. He had been receiving treatment at a hospital in Karachi. He had undergone throat surgery at Aga Khan Hospital, Karachi, but his health had deteriorated in days prior to his death.
