= A.R. Jamali =

Pakistani politician (died 2015)

- میر عبدالرحمن خان جمالی

Provincial Assembly of Balochistan
- In office 2011–2015
- Preceded by: Zahoor Khan Khosa
- Succeeded by: unknown
- Constituency: Jafarabad

Senate of Pakistan
- Constituency: Balochistan

Personal details
- Died: March 7, 2015 (aged 69) Karachi, Pakistan
- Resting place: Rojhan Jamali
- Political party: Pakistan People's Party (since 2011)
- Relatives: Zafarullah Khan Jamali (brother); Jafar Khan Jamali (uncle); Jan Mohammad Jamali (nephew)

Mir Abdul Rehman Khan Jamali (Note: Urdu: میر عبدالرحمن خان جمالی) (died 7 March 2015) was a Pakistani politician from the Jamali family. He was the younger brother of the former Prime Minister of Pakistan, Zafarullah Khan Jamali. He was the nephew of Jafar Khan Jamali, an All-India Muslim League leader from Balochistan, who was involved in the Pakistan Movement. He was the uncle of Jan Mohammad Jamali, former speaker of Balochistan Assembly.

Jamali had been a member of the Senate from Balochistan and was twice elected as a member of the Provincial Assembly of Balochistan from Jafarabad district.
