= Abdul Majeed Badini =

Pakistani politician

Member of the Provincial Assembly of Balochistan
- Incumbent
- Assumed office 28 February 2024
- Constituency: PB-16 Jafarabad

Personal details
- Born: Jafarabad District, Balochistan, Pakistan
- Political party: Jamaat-e-Islami Pakistan (2016–present)

Abdul Majeed Badini is a Pakistani politician from Jafarabad District. He is currently serving as a member of the Provincial Assembly of Balochistan since Feb 2024.

== Early life and education ==
He was born into a Baloch family of the Badini tribe in Jafarabad District, Balochistan and became politically active in the 1990s while studying mechanical engineering at the Khuzdar Engineering University, joining the Islami Jamiat-e-Talaba (IJT), the student organization of the Jamaat-e-Islami Pakistan (JIP), formally joining the JI itself in 2016.

== Political career ==
He contested the 2018 general elections as a Jamaat-e-Islami Pakistan candidate from PB-16 Jafarabad. He secured less than 2,000 votes and lost to Umar Khan Jamali.

He contested again in the 2024 general elections on the same platform, this time winning 15,248 votes and defeating Rahat Jamali (PML-N). It was a historical win for any middle class to beat elite family in Balochistan, the Jamali family being influent in the wider Nasirabad Division which includes the Jafarabad District, observers attributing their loss to their lack of proactive response to the 2022 floods.
