= Jan Mohammad Jamali =

Pakistani politician

Jan Mohammad Jamali مير جان محمد جمالی
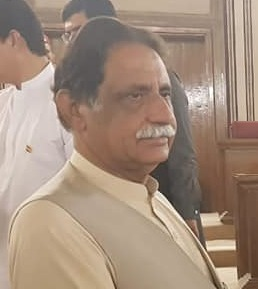

Speaker of Provincial Assembly of Balochistan
- In office 30 October 2021 – 29 February 2024
- Deputy: Sardar Babar Khan Musakhel
- Preceded by: Abdul Quddus Bizenjo
- Succeeded by: Abdul Khaliq Khan
- In office 4 June 2013 – 2 May 2015
- Deputy: Abdul Quddus Bizenjo
- Preceded by: Syed Matiullah Agha
- Succeeded by: Rahila Durrani

Chairman of the Senate Acting
- In office 18 August 2008 – 9 September 2008
- Preceded by: Muhammad Mian Soomro
- Succeeded by: Muhammad Mian Soomro
- In office 16 November 2007 – 25 March 2008
- Preceded by: Muhammad Mian Soomro
- Succeeded by: Muhammad Mian Soomro

Chief Minister of Balochistan
- In office 15 June 1998 – 12 October 1999
- Governor: Miangul Aurangzeb; Fazal Agha
- Preceded by: Akhtar Mengal
- Succeeded by: Jam Mohammad Yousaf

Governor of Balochistan Acting
- In office 13 April 2022 – 3 March 2023
- President: Arif Alvi
- Prime Minister: Shehbaz Sharif
- Preceded by: Syed Zahoor Ahmad Agha
- Succeeded by: Abdul Wali Kakar

Personal details
- Born: 23 May 1955 (age 70) Usta, Balochistan, Pakistan
- Party: BAP (2018 – present)
- Other political affiliations: PML N (2013-2018); PML Q (2001-2013); PML N (1997-2001)
- Relations: Rahat Jamali (sister); Zafarullah Khan Jamali (uncle); Taj Muhammad Jamali (uncle); Mir Khan Muhammad Jamali (uncle); A.R. Jamali (uncle); Jafar Khan Jamali (grand uncle); Umar Khan Jamali (cousin)

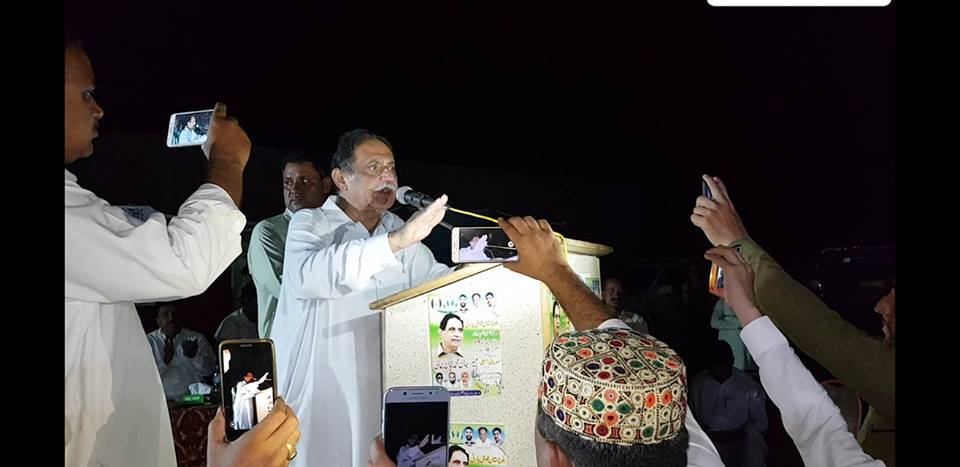
Mir Jan Muhammad Jamali during election campaign in 2018

Mir Jan Mohammad Khan Jamali (Urdu: مير جان محمد جمالی; born 23 May 1955) is a Pakistani politician who served as the Speaker of the Balochistan Assembly from 4 June 2013 to 2015. Mir Jan Muhammad Jamali served as the 9th Chief Minister of Balochistan from 13 August 1998 till 12 October 1999 when Army Chief General Pervaiz Mushraf took over the Government. He served two terms as Deputy Chairman of the Senate of Pakistan from March 2006 to March 2012. Jan Mohammad Jamali contested the 2013 elections from PB25 (now PB14) and won on the seat of PML-N. In 2018, he again contested from PB14 and won on the ticket of BAP. He is a well-known personality throughout Balochistan.

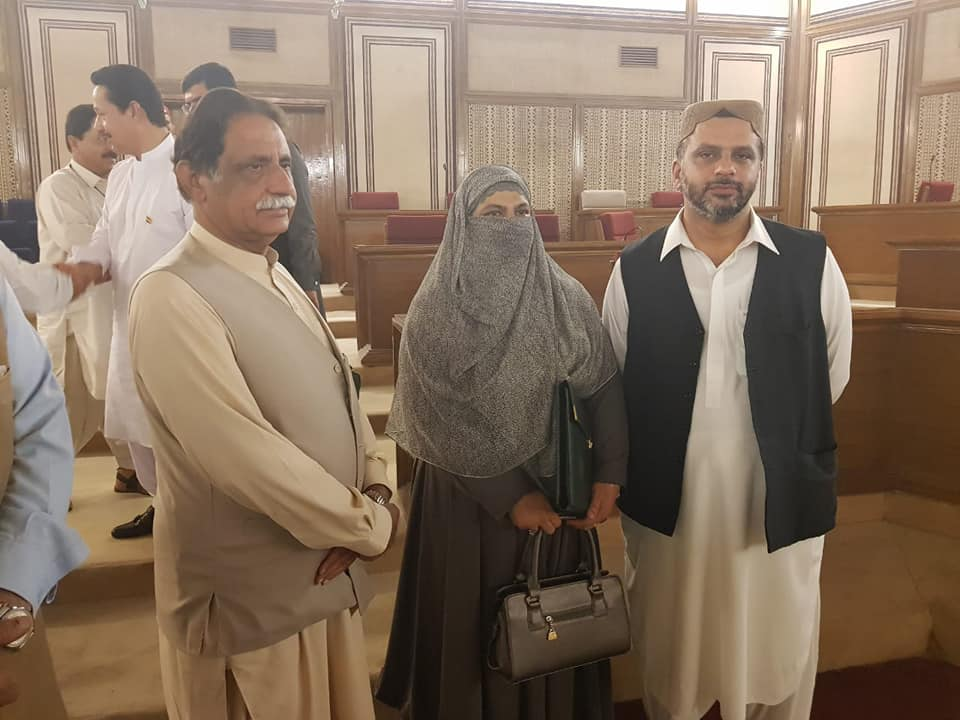
Jan Muhammad Jamali with MPA Rubaba Khan Buledi in Provincial Assembly of Balochistan

He is the son of prominent Baloch leader Mir Noor Mohammad Jamali. Mir Jan Mohammad Jamali is from Jaffarabad, in Pakistan's Balochistan province.

Mir Jan Mohammad Jamali was the Chairman of the Municipal Usta Mohammad from 1983 to 1990. He was a member of the Provisional Council of Balochistan from 1983 to 1985. He was first elected as a member of the Provincial Assembly of Balochistan in 1988, serving until 1993. He was a provisional minister from 1993 to 1996. In 1998, he became the Chief Minister of Balochistan, serving until 1999. He served as Speaker of the Balochistan Assembly, a post from 30 October 2021 to 18 August 2023.

Political offices
Preceded by Akhtar Mengal	Chief Minister of Balochistan; 1998–1999	Succeeded by Jam Mohammad Yousaf
Preceded by Muhammad Mian Soomro	Chairman of the Senate; Acting; 2007–2008	Succeeded by Muhammad Mian Soomro
Preceded by Muhammad Mian Soomro	Chairman of the Senate; Acting; 2008	Succeeded by Muhammad Mian Soomro
Preceded by Khalilur Rehman	Deputy Chairman of the Senate; 2006-2012	Succeeded by Sabir Ali Baloch
