= Usta =

Usta may refer to:

== Places ==
- Usta, Iran, a city in Razavi Khorasan Province, Iran
- Usta, South Dakota, a community in the United States
- Usta Mohammad, a city in Pakistan

== Rivers ==
- Usta (Norway)
- Usta (Russia), a river in Nizhny Novgorod Oblast in Russia

== Tribe ==
- Usta (tribe), a Sindhi tribe

== Other ==
- Usta (name)
- Usta (moth), a genus of moths
- Usta art, practiced in Rajasthan, India
- Usta, the original Turkish title of The Master

== See also ==
- Ustad
- USTA (disambiguation)
