= Goth Mewa Khan Lehri =

Goth Mewa Khan Lehri, also known as Mewa Khan Lehri, is a village in the Jaffarabad District of Balochistan Province, Pakistan. The village is near the city of Usta Mohammad.
