= Faisal Khan Jamali =

Pakistani politician

Member of the Provincial Assembly of Balochistan
- Incumbent
- Assumed office 29 February 2024
- Constituency: PB-17 Usta Muhammad

Personal details
- Born: Usta Muhammad District, Balochistan, Pakistan
- Political party: PPP (2024-present)

Sardar Mir Faisal Khan Jamali is a Pakistani politician from Usta Muhammad District. He is currently serving as a member of the Provincial Assembly of Balochistan since February 2024.

== Career ==
He contested the 2024 general elections as a Pakistan People’s Party candidate from PB-17 Usta Muhammad. He secured 28,333 votes while his runner-up was Jan Mohammad Jamali of BAP who secured 13,977 votes.
