= NA-254 Nasirabad-cum-Kachhi-cum-Jhal Magsi =

Constituency of the National Assembly of Pakistan

- Constituency for the National Assembly of Pakistan
- Region: Kachhi District, Jhal Magsi District, Nasirabad District (partly)
- Electorate: 365,862

Current constituency
- Created: 2018
- Party: Balochistan Awami Party
- Member: Khalid Hussain Magsi
- Created from: NA-260 Nasirabad-cum-Kachhi-cum-Jhal Magsi

NA-254 Nasirabad-cum-Kachhi-cum-Jhal Magsi (این اے-۲۵۴، نصیرآباد-بمع-کچھی-بمع-جھل مگھسی) is a newly-created constituency for the National Assembly of Pakistan. It comprises the districts of Nasirabad, Kachhi and Jhal Magsi from the province of Balochistan.

== Assembly Segments ==
Constituency number	Constituency	District	Current MPA	Party
11	PB-11 Jhal Magsi	Jhal Magsi	Nawabzada Tariq Magsi	BAP
12	PB-12 Kachhi	Kachhi	Mohammad Asim Kurd	PML(N)
13	PB-13 Nasirabad-I	Nasirabad	Muhammad Sadiq Umrani	PPP
14	PB-14 Nasirabad-II	Nasirabad	Muhammad Khan Lehri	PML(N)

== Members of Parliament ==
=== Since 2018: NA-260 Nasirabad-cum-Kachhi-cum-Jhal Magsi ===
Election	Member	Party
2018	Khalid Hussain Magsi	BAP

=== 2024–present: NA-254 Naisrabad-cum-Kachhi-cum-Jhal Mahdi ===
Election	Member	Party
2024	Khalid Hussain Magsi	BAP

== Election 2018 ==
General elections were held on 25 July 2018.

General election 2018: NA-260 Nasirabad-cum-Kachhi-cum-Jhal Magsi
Party	Candidate	Votes	%	±%
BAP	Khalid Hussain Magsi	53,330	41.14	
PTI	Yar Muhammad Rind	40,188	31.01	
Others	Others (Twenty-four candidates)	36,099	27.85	
Turnout		143,214	39.14	
Total valid votes		129,617	90.51	
Rejected ballots		13,597	9.49	
Majority		13,142	10.13	
Registered electors		365,862		
BAP gain from PML(N)				

== Election 2024 ==
General elections were held on 8 February 2024. Khalid Hussain Magsi won the election with 79,304 votes.

General election 2024: NA-254 Nasirabad-cum-Kachhi-cum-Jhal Magsi
Party	Candidate	Votes	%	±%
BAP	Khalid Hussain Magsi	79,304	54.72	▲13.58
JUI (F)	Nizam Ud Din Lehri	44,814	30.92	N/A
PPP	Yar Muhammad Rind	4,540	3.13	N/A
Others	Others (twenty four candidates)	16,274	11.23	
Turnout		152,683	47.02	▲7.88
Total valid votes		144,932	94.92	
Rejected ballots		7,751	5.08	
Majority		34,490	23.80	▲13.67
Registered electors		324,739		
BAP hold				

== See also ==
- NA-253 Ziarat-cum-Harnai-cum-Sibbi-cum-Kohlu-cum-Dera Bugti
- NA-255 Sohbat Pur-cum-Jaffarabad-cum-Usta Muhammad-cum-Nasirabad
