= Badini (surname) =

Badini is a surname. Notable people with the surname include:

- Abdul Majeed Badini, Pakistani politician
- Alidou Badini, Burkinabé filmmaker
- Angelo Badini, (1894–1921), Italian Argentine footballer
- Boureima Badini (born 1956), Burkinabé politician
- Carlo Maria Badini (1925–2007), Italian arts administrator
- Emilio Badini (1897–1956), Italian Argentine footballer
- Ernesto Badini (1876–1937), Italian opera singer
- Gérard Badini (1931–2025), French jazz bandleader, composer, reedist, and pianist
- Jérôme Badini, French saxophonist, composer
- Mir Muhammad Yousaf Badini, Pakistani politician
- Muneer Ahmed Badini (born 1953), Pakistani novelist and writer
- Usman Badini, Pakistani politician
