= Babbar (tribe) =

Baloch tribe

Babbar Tribe
Regions with significant populations
- Balochistan, Sindh, Punjab

Languages
- Balochi, Sindhi, Siraiki,

Religion
- Islam

Related ethnic groups
- Baloch, Jamali, Saraiki

Babbar, Babur, Babar is a Baloch tribe which lives in Pakistan in Northern Sindh, Balochistan and Dera Ghazi Khan division of Punjab. It is also found in the Pishin District of Rask County, Sistan and Baluchestan province, Iran. A sizeable population also inhabits the Nasirabad Division of Balochistan.

Babbars of Balochistan and Sindh are a sub-tribe of the Jamali tribe, whereas in the Dera Ghazi Khan District, Babbars also exist as a section within the Leghari tribe.
