= Hinduism in Balochistan, Pakistan =

Hinduism in Balochistan
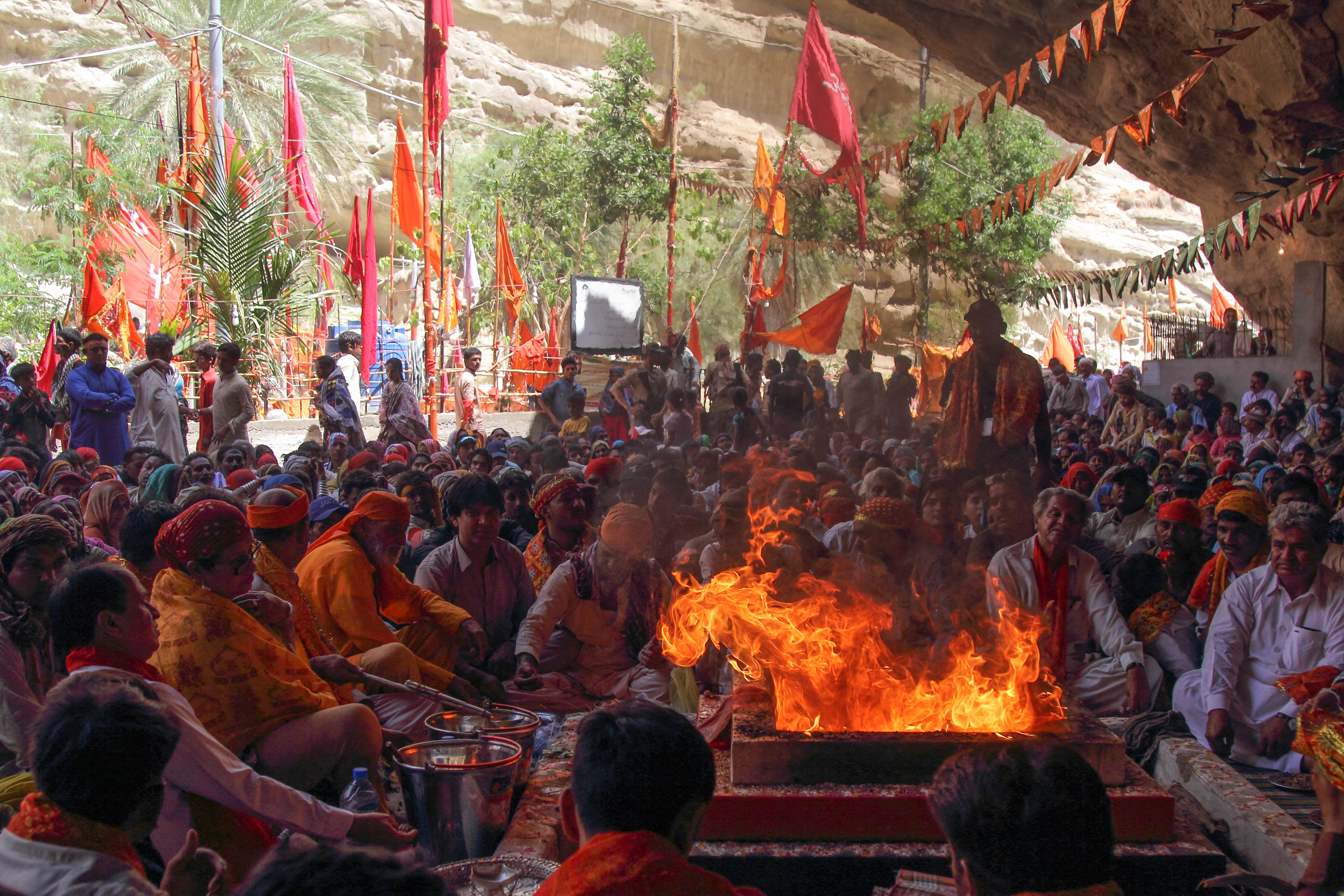
- Hawan at Shri Hinglaj Mata temple.

Total population
- 59,107 ▲ (2023); 0.41% of Balochistan's total population

Religions
- Hinduism

Scriptures
- Bhagavad Gita, and Vedas

Languages
- Sanskrit (sacred); Balochi, Sindhi (majority); Urdu and other languages (minority)

Hinduism in Balochistan (Sanskrit: बलूचिस्तान में हिन्दू धर्म; Balochi: ہندومت بلۏچستان تہا), specifically the Pakistani province of Balochistan, followed by 0.41% of the population of the province. It is the largest minority religion in Balochistan. Balochistan is home to the shrine of Shri Hinglaj Mata temple, which is one of the most sacred Hindu temples. The annual Hinglaj Yatra to the temple is the largest Hindu pilgrimage sites in Pakistan.

== History ==
=== Ancient era ===
After the victory of the Mauryan Empire against the Greeks in the Seleucid–Mauryan war, much of Balochistan came under the rule of Chandragupta Maurya of ancient India. Chandragupta and Seleucus made a peace settlement in 303 BCE. Selecucus Nucator ceded the satrapies, including those in Balochistan to the expanding Mauryan Empire. The alliance was solidified with a marriage between Chandragupta Maurya and a princess of the Seleucid Empire. The outcome of the arrangement proved to be mutually beneficial. The border between the Seleucid and Mauryan Empires remained stable in subsequent generations, and friendly diplomatic relations are reflected by the ambassador Megasthenes, and by the envoys sent westward by Chandragupta's grandson Ashoka.

From the 1st century to the 3rd century CE, the region of modern Pakistani Balochistan was ruled by the Paratarajas (the "Patatahaa kings"), a Hindu dynasty of Indo-Scythian or Indo-Parthian kings. The Hindu Parata kings are essentially known through their coins, which typically exhibit the bust of the ruler with long hair in a headband on the obverse and a swastika within a circular legend on the reverse, written in Brahmi script, usually silver coins, or Kharoshthi copper coins. These coins are mainly found in Loralai in today's western Pakistan. In 635 or 636 CE, the Hindu Brahman dynasty of Sindh controlled parts of Balochistan, under Chach of Aror.

Iranian Balochistan had some of the earliest human civilizations in history. The Burnt City near Dozaap (Zahedan) dates to 2000 BCE. All of what is now Balochistan was incorporated in the Achaemenid, Seleucid, Parthian, and Sassanid Iranian empires. There were five major Hindu kings in the 2nd century; Yolamira, son of Bagavera, Arjuna, son of Yolamira, Hvaramira, another son of Yolamira, Mirahvara, son of Hvaramira, and Miratakhma, another son of Hvaramira.

The earliest people in Balochistan were the Brahui people, a Dravidian speaking people closely related to the Dravidian speaking people of south India. The Hindu Sewa Dynasty ruled much of region of Balochistan up until the 7th century AD. The Sibi division which was carved out of the Quetta division still derives its name from Rani Sewi, the queen of the Hindu Sewa dynasty. The migration of the Muslims and Baloch to the southern and central Balochistan displaced the Dravidian Hindu Sewais, while the existing remaining Dravidian Hindus intermingled with Baloch tribes, which led to the formation of Brahui language. The Baloch migration to the region occurred in the Western Makaran, however they didn't spread to Kalat region due to the Hindu Sewa Dynasty. But by the end of 13th century, when Mughals started invasions within south Asia, they formed alliance with Baloch and defeated the Sewais, which led to their migration to Sindh.

In 634 CE, the Hindu Brahman dynasty of Sindh controlled parts of Balochistan.

=== Colonial era ===
During the colonial era, detailed decadal census reports covered Hinduism in the Baluchistan Agency of British India. The 1911 census counted a total of 38,326 Hindus in the province, forming approximately 4.6 percent of the total population. Of the total, 14,985 Hindus (39 percent) belonged to indigenous tribes of the Balochistan region, and 22,617 Hindus (59 percent) were migrants from other regions of the country.

Being a religious minority in the region for centuries, colonial officials found that indigenous Baloch Hindus developed a form of religious syncretism that incorporated many aspects of Islam into their cultures and traditions, greatly differing from the forms of orthodox Hinduism practiced in other parts of the subcontinent. Furthermore, caste and family ancestry was often difficult to ascertain, as Hindus indigenous to the Balochistan region mainly solely identified as a member of their respective Baloch tribe, typically unknowing of their caste background.

"Proverbially elastic though the term is, Hinduism is stretched almost to breaking point in Baluchistan. It is not merely that the Hinduism of the domiciled Hindu families widely different from the Hinduism they see practised among the alien immigrants; there is precious little in their religion that would pass for Hinduism in more enlightened parts of India. It almost looks as if the singular freedom from persecution which the old Hindu families have always enjoyed at the hands of their Musalman over-lords had given Islam greater scope to impart its subtle influence to their inward beliefs and outward practices. Knowing no sacred books but the Sikh scriptures, and with priests (Brahmans though they may be) as ignorant of the Shastras as themselves, these benighted Hindus have allowed nearly all their rites and ceremonies to become coloured with an Islamic tinge. They reverently resort to Muhammadan shrines; they invoke Muhammadan saints; in times of trouble they are glad of the help of charm mongering mullahs. It is not uncommon to find them observing Muhammadan fasts, or participating in the Muharram and other Muhammadan festivals."
"The Hindus of Kalat town — undoubtedly among the oldest in the community — claim to be offshoots of the mysterious Sewa dynasty that ruled in Kalat centuries before the Brahui Confederacy took shape. But though the Bhatia of Las Bela punctiliously refer their advent to the year 708 A.D., and the Hindus of Lahri tell in all good faith of their journeyings from Aleppo with Chakar the Rind, the early history of these old Hindu families is hopelessly befogged. Everything, however, seems to point to the western Panjab and Sind as the countries from which most of them came, though isolated families in Nushki may have immigrated by way of Afghanistan, and a few others may have wandered in from the far corners of India. Originally they may have been as diverse as the villages from which they came and the dates of their coming. Today the old Hindu families form a more or less homogeneous community. In particular customs no doubt they vary considerably; but common environment has set its common mark on them all. And it is in the effect of an alien environment on Hindus and Hindu caste that the main interest in these old trading families of Baluchistan is centred."
"Except in Quetta, where the Hindu community has become so overgrown that conditions are abnormal, neither caste nor sub-caste enters into their composition: there is nothing incongruous or unusual in a Panchayat subscribing impartially to a Sikh Dharamsala and to the worship of a Devi or of Darya Pir; or in a Panchayat (like that of Chuharkot in Barkhan) which is composed almost wholly of Aroras having a Brahman as its president. In other words, a Panchayat is a Panchayat not of caste-members but of the whole body of Hindus in a village community. It is indeed almost always sheer waste of time to question a member of one of these old Hindu families regarding his caste. Brahman he knows and Musalman he knows; and it is enough for him that he is neither the one nor the other, but a Hindu pure and simple. Most of the families are undoubtedly Arora; some few are very possibly Khatri; the Bhatia of Las Bela are probably Rajput. But these are distinctions too nice for a local Hindu; it is more than possible that he may never have heard the terms before. Nevertheless, though his mind may be a blank as to the name of his caste, he can sometimes give the name of his sub-caste—possibly a hoary name like Ahuja, possibly a newly coined name like Ramzai or Panjazai, modelled on the name of a tribal section. But it is merely a matter of names after all. The Ramzai and the Panjazai and the Ahuja may have each some cherished peculiarities of their own. But such peculiarities strike no discord between them. The old Hindu families are a brotherhood of equals; among themselves they know no distinctions valid enough to influence the intercourse of everyday life."

— Excerpts from the Census of India, 1911 AD

The 1921 census counted a total of 51,348 Hindus in Balochistan, forming approximately 6.4 percent of the total population. Hindus belonging to the indigenous tribes of the Balochistan region numbered 17,479 persons and formed 34 percent of the total Hindu population, while migrants from other regions of the country numbered 33,869 persons or 66 percent of the total Hindu population.

The 1931 census counted a total of 53,681 Hindus in Balochistan, forming roughly 6.2 percent of the total population. Hindus associated with the indigenous tribes of the Balochistan region numbered 16,905 persons and formed nearly 31.5 percent of the total Hindu population. Conversely, migrants from other regions of the country numbered 36,776 persons and made up approximately 68.5 percent of the total Hindu population.

After the partition of British India and the ensuing creation of Pakistan, many Hindus migrated to India, particularly the Bhagnaris community.

=== Modern era ===
During the 2005–2006 armed uprising in Balochistan, members from the Hindu community were attacked and targeted by the Pakistani security forces. All the Hindus residing in the town of Dera Bugti fled and were forced to take refugee in the Sui region of Balochistan and other provinces of Pakistan. These attacks resulted in deaths of 33 Hindus, most of them were men and children.

In February 2025, two Hindu men Hari Lal and Moti Lal were gunned down while another person, Shero Mal sustained injury. These were targeted killings by unidentified assailants who opened fired near Star Plus market in Turbat within the Kech District.

== Demographics ==
According to the 1998 Census, Balochistan had approximately 39,000 Hindus (including the Scheduled Castes) constituting 0.59% of the population; the 2017 Census revealed that despite the population growing to 49,133, the percentage decreased to 0.4%, while as per the 2023 Census, the percentage increased slightly to 0.41%, with a population of 59,107 Hindus in Balochistan. The Pakistan Hindu Council estimates that there are 117,345 Hindus in Balochistan in 2018, while the Pakistan Hindu Panchayat estimated the population to be over 100,000 in 2012.

The Hindu population is predominantly Urban, about 73%. The urban areas with largest Hindu population are Bela city (7.22%), Sohbatpur (6.83%), Bhag (5.71%), Winder (5.57%), Usta Muhammad (5.11%), Sibi city (4.57%), Uthal (4.37%) and Dalbandin (4.21%).

Census Year	Hinduism in Baluchistan Agency and Balochistan Province (1901–2023)		
Census Year	Hindu Population	Hindu Percentage	Total Population
1901	38,158	4.71%	810,746
1911	38,326	4.59%	834,703
1921	51,348	6.42%	799,625
1931	53,681	6.18%	868,617
1941	54,394	6.34%	857,835
1951	13,087	1.13%	1,154,167
1961	9,836	0.85%	1,161,011
1972	18,223	0.75%	2,428,678
1981	19,598	0.45%	4,332,376
1998	39,146	0.6%	6,565,885
2017	49,133	0.4%	12,344,408
2023	59,107	0.41%	14,562,011

=== Colonial era ===
At the district level in Baluchistan Agency, as per the 1941 census, the largest Hindu concentrations existed in Quetta–Pishin District (Hindus formed 18.32 percent of the total population and numbered 28,629 persons), Bolan District (15.81 percent or 950 persons), and Zhob District (6.97 percent or 4,286 persons).

Hindus in the Districts & Princely states of Baluchistan Agency (1901–1941)
District or Princely State	1901		1911		1921		1931		1941	
District or Princely State	Pop.	%	Pop.	%	Pop.	%	Pop.	%	Pop.	%
Kalat State	13,780	3.38%	10,102	2.81%	11,205	3.41%	10,806	3.16%	7,971	3.15%
Quetta–Pishin District	11,752	10.3%	13,746	10.77%	22,300	16.27%	26,718	18.11%	28,629	18.32%
Thal–Chotiali District/ Sibi District (Note: 1903: Thal-Chotiali District abolished and bifurcated with the majority added to the administered area of Sibi District and a smaller portion added to the newly created Loralai District.)	6,560	5.86%	7,420	6.33%	6,449	5.4%	5,893	4.12%	6,425	3.9%
Zhob District	3,086	2.98%	1,391	1.98%	3,398	6%	2,839	4.9%	4,286	6.97%
Las Bela State	2,069	3.69%	1,736	2.84%	1,465	2.89%	1,443	2.29%	1,701	2.46%
Bolan District	582	30.06%	540	25.76%	969	26.78%	1,165	24.85%	950	15.81%
Chaghai District	329	2.1%	385	2.36%	1,931	9.05%	1,313	5.42%	1,204	4.02%
Loralai District	—N/a	—N/a	3,006	3.72%	3,631	4.4%	3,504	4.07%	3,129	3.74%
Kharan State	—N/a	—N/a	—N/a	—N/a	—N/a	—N/a	—N/a	—N/a	99	0.29%
Total Hindus (Princely States)	15,849	3.42%	11,838	2.82%	12,670	3.34%	12,249	3.02%	9,771	2.74%
Total Hindus (Districts)	22,309	6.43%	26,488	6.39%	38,678	9.19%	41,432	8.94%	44,623	8.9%
Total Hindus (Baluchistan Agency)	38,158	4.71%	38,326	4.59%	51,348	6.42%	53,681	6.18%	54,394	6.34%
Total Population (Districts)	347,165	42.82%	414,412	49.65%	420,648	52.61%	463,508	53.36%	501,631	58.48%
Total Population (Princely States)	463,581	57.18%	420,291	50.35%	378,977	47.39%	405,109	46.64%	356,204	41.52%
Total Population (Baluchistan Agency)	810,746	100%	834,703	100%	799,625	100%	868,617	100%	857,835	100%

=== Modern era ===
Hindus in the administrative divisions within Balochistan (1951–2023)
District	1951		2017		2023	
District	Pop.	%	Pop.	%	Pop.	%
Kalat State/ Kalat District	7,666	2.71%	1,263	0.31%	1,067	0.39%
Sibi District	2,717	1.31%	4,330	2.41%	4,252	1.9%
Lasbela State/ Lasbela District (Note: The Hub district was formed out of this district by merging Gadani, Winder, Hub and Dureji tehsils. So the data was obtained by removing the values for these 4 tehsils)	1,030	1.36%	9,096	1.58%	8799	2.95%
Quetta–Pishin District/ Quetta District	945	0.45%	6,362	0.28%	5,775	0.25%
Chagai District	323	0.92%	977	0.43%	896	0.33%
Loralai District	161	0.19%	627	0.16%	435	0.16%
Kharan State/ Kharan District	114	0.21%	470	0.29%	1,912	0.73%
Zhob District	73	0.11%	191	0.06%	232	0.07%
Makran State	58	0.04%	—N/a	—N/a	—N/a	—N/a
Jafarabad District (Note: The Usta Mohammad district was formed in 2022 by carving Usta Muhammad and Gandakha tehsils out of erstwhile Jaffarabad district. 2023 census data was obtained by removing the totals of these two tehsils.)	—N/a	—N/a	6,872	1.34%	3,381	1.12%
Khuzdar District	—N/a	—N/a	3,642	0.46%	4,950	0.5%
Kachhi District	—N/a	—N/a	3,229	1.04%	3,956	0.89%
Nasirabad District	—N/a	—N/a	3,213	1.6%	2,666	0.47%
Sohbatpur District	—N/a	—N/a	1,355	0.68%	1,804	0.75%
Dera Bugti District	—N/a	—N/a	1,346	0.43%	1,099	0.31%
Kech District	—N/a	—N/a	1,293	0.14%	406	0.04%
Jhal Magsi District	—N/a	—N/a	1,196	0.8%	1,252	0.62%
Nushki District	—N/a	—N/a	1,001	0.56%	1,427	0.69%
Gwadar District	—N/a	—N/a	657	0.25%	833	0.28%
Mastung District	—N/a	—N/a	525	0.2%	914	0.29%
Killa Abdullah District	—N/a	—N/a	393	0.05%	34	0.01%
Harnai District	—N/a	—N/a	314	0.32%	421	0.33%
Panjgur District	—N/a	—N/a	227	0.07%	302	0.06%
Ziarat District	—N/a	—N/a	190	0.12%	154	0.08%
Awaran District	—N/a	—N/a	94	0.08%	19	0.01%
Kohlu District	—N/a	—N/a	62	0.03%	38	0.01%
Barkhan District	—N/a	—N/a	57	0.03%	4	0%
Washuk District	—N/a	—N/a	49	0.03%	26	0.01%
Killa Saifullah District	—N/a	—N/a	36	0.01%	16	0%
Musakhel District	—N/a	—N/a	29	0.02%	7	0%
Sherani District	—N/a	—N/a	19	0.01%	15	0.01%
Pishin District	—N/a	—N/a	18	0%	61	0.01%
Hub District (Note: The Hub district was formed in 2022 by carving Gadani, Winder, Hub and Dureji tehsils out of erstwhile Lasbela district. 2023 census data was obtained by merging the totals of these four tehsils.)	—N/a	—N/a	—N/a	—N/a	7,681	2.01%
Usta Muhammad District (Note: The Usta Mohammad district was formed in 2022 by carving out Usta Muhammad and Gandakha tehsils out of erstwhile Jafarabad district. 2023 census data was obtained by merging the values of these two tehsils.)	—N/a	—N/a	—N/a	—N/a	3,998	1.37%
Chaman District	—N/a	—N/a	—N/a	—N/a	213	0.05%
Duki District	—N/a	—N/a	—N/a	—N/a	39	0.02%
Surab District	—N/a	—N/a	—N/a	—N/a	23	0.01%
Total Hindus	13,087	1.13%	49,133	0.4%	59,107	0.41%
Total responses	1,154,167	98.31%	12,335,129	100%	14,562,011	97.77%
Total population	1,174,036	100%	12,335,129	100%	14,894,402	100%

== Community life ==
Only a minority of Baloch people are Hindus. There are ethnic Hindu Balochs among the Bugti, Marri, Rind, Bezenjo, Zehri, Mengal, and other Baloch tribes. They also live under the Balochi tribal system There are also Pashtun Hindus. Sanzari Hindu is a Hindu sub-tribe of Kakar Sanzarkhel pashtun tribe.

Compared to the rest of the country, the Hindus in Balochistan province are relatively more secure and face less religious persecution. The tribal chiefs in Balochistan, particularly the Jams of Lasbela and Bugti of Dera Bugti, consider non-Muslims including Hindus as members of their own extended family and allows religious freedom. They have never forced Hindus to convert. In Balochistan Hindu places of worship are proportionate to their population. For example, between Uthal and Bela jurisdiction in Lasbela District, there are 18 temples for 5,000 Hindus living in the area, which is an indicator of religious freedom. However, in Khuzdar District and Kalat District, Hindus face discrimination.

Hindu marriages in Balochistan are registered under the Hindu marriage act of 2017. In Balochistan provincial assembly, there are three seats reserved for minorities. Hindus usually get elected on 1–2 seats.

== Temples ==
The Hinglaj Mata mandir is one of the 51 Shaktipeeths in Hinduism. It is revered by local Hindus, Sikhs, and a few Muslims who refer to it as nani pir or nani mandir.

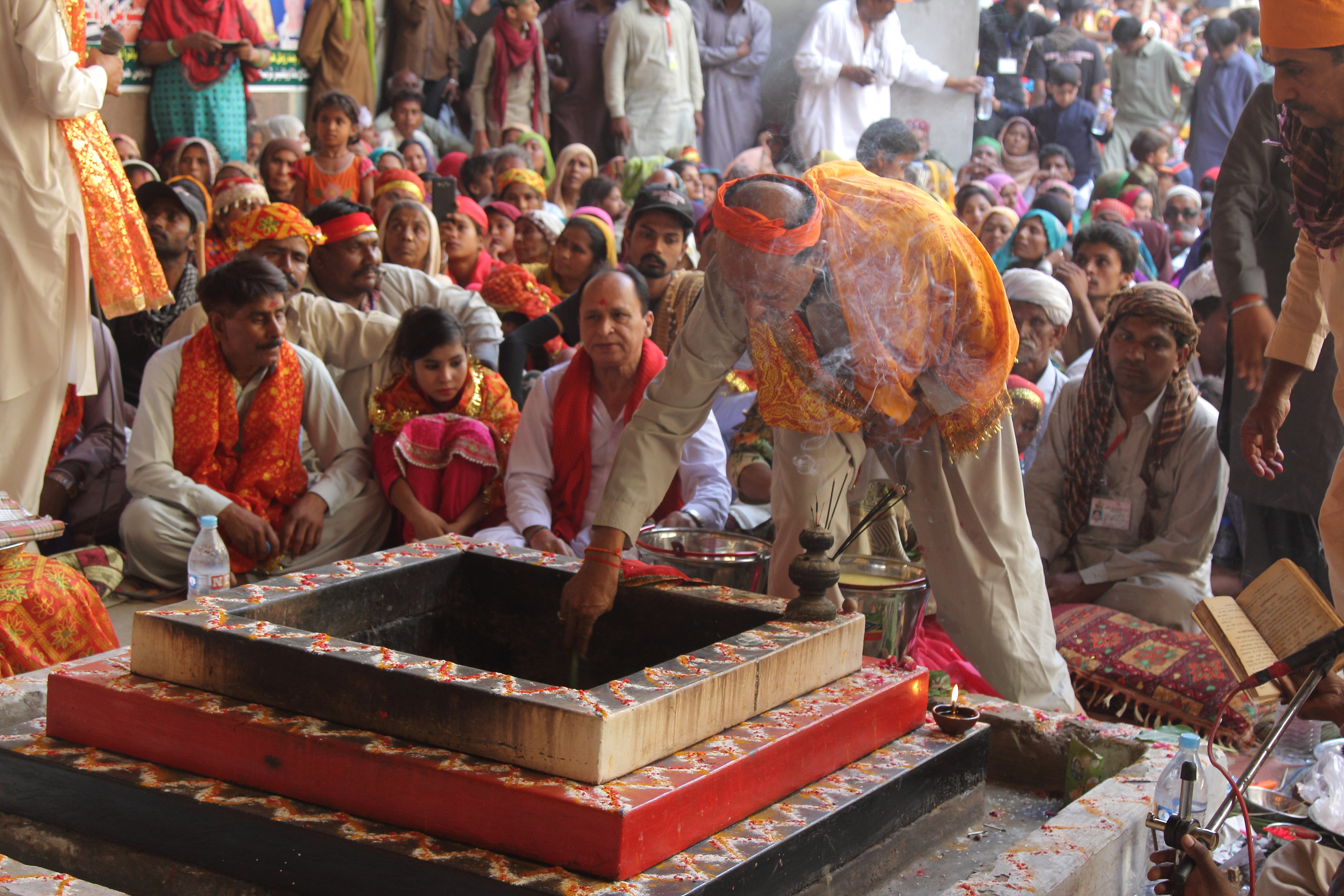
Hawan at Hinglaj Mata mandir

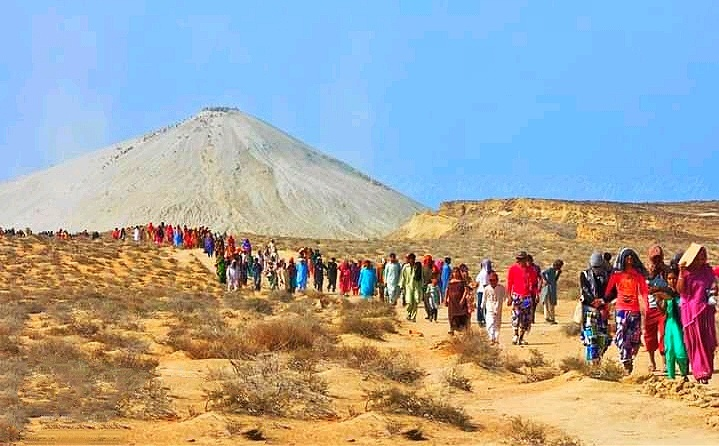
Baba Chandragup is an important stop during Hinglaj Yatra

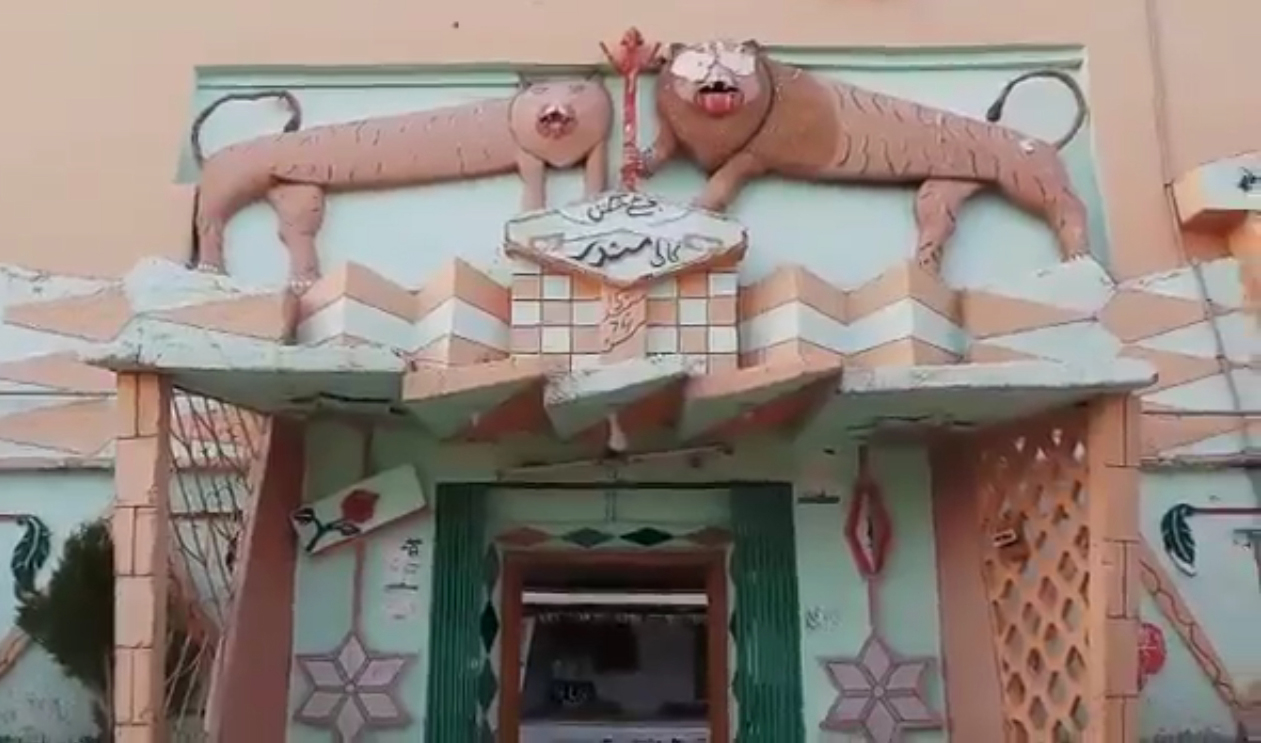
Kalat Kali Temple in Kalat, Pakistan

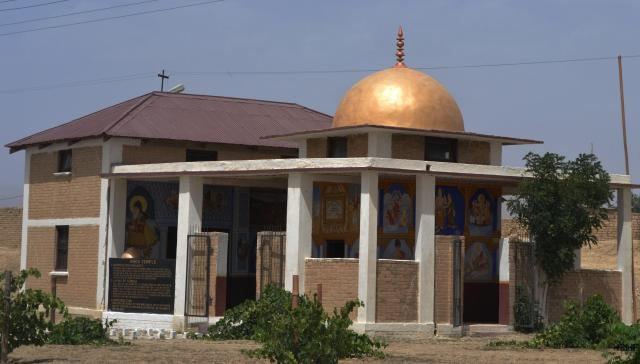
Sidh Pani Nath Ji Temple in Quetta

== See also ==
- Hinduism in Pakistan
  - Hinduism in Islamabad Capital Territory
  - Hinduism in Khyber Pakhtunkhwa
  - Hinduism in Punjab, Pakistan
  - Hinduism in Sindh
- Shri Krishna Mandir, Gwadar

== Sources ==
- Kosmin, Paul J. (2014). The Land of the Elephant Kings: Space, Territory, and Ideology in Seleucid Empire. Harvard University Press. ISBN 978-0-674-72882-0.
