= PB-14 Nasirabad-II =

Constituency of the Provincial Assembly of Balochistan, Pakistan

- Constituency for the Provincial Assembly of Balochistan
- Region: Dera Murad Jamali (partly), Baba Kot and Tamboo Tehsils of Nasirabad District

Current constituency
- Party: Balochistan Awami Party
- Member: Muhammad Khan Lehri
- Created from: PB-28 (Nasirabad-IV)

PB-14 Nasirabad-II (پی بی-14 نصیر آباد-2) is a constituency of the Provincial Assembly of Balochistan.

== General elections 2024 ==
Provincial election 2024: PB-14 Nasirabad-II
Party	Candidate	Votes	%	±%
PML(N)	Muhammad Khan Lehri	21,103	50.09	
PPP	Ghulam Rasool	19,039	45.19	
Others	Others (twenty four candidates)	1,990	4.72	
Turnout		47,672	46.21	
Total valid votes		42,132	88.28	
Rejected ballots		5,540	11.72	
Majority		2,064	4.90	
Registered electors		103,173		

== General elections 2013 ==
Contesting candidates	Party affiliation	Votes polled

== General elections 2008 ==
Contesting candidates	Party affiliation	Votes polled

== See also ==
- PB-13 Nasirabad-I
- PB-15 Sohbatpur
