= Mir Khan Muhammad Jamali =

Pakistani politician (born 1957)

- میر خان محمد جمالی

Member of the National Assembly of Pakistan
- Incumbent
- Assumed office 29 February 2024
- Constituency: NA-255 Sohbat Pur-cum-Jaffarabad-cum-Usta Muhammad-cum-Nasirabad
- In office 13 August 2018 – 10 August 2023
- Constituency: NA-261 (Jafarabad-cum-Sohbatpur)

Personal details
- Born: February 15, 1957 (age 69) Jafarabad District, Balochistan, Pakistan
- Party: IPP (2026-present)
- Other political affiliations: PMLN (2023-2026); PTI (2018-2023)
- Relations: Jamali family

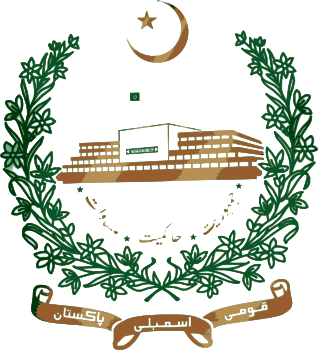
The emblem of the National Assembly of Pakistan

Mir Khan Muhammad Jamali (Note: Urdu: میر خان محمد جمالی) (born 1957) is a Pakistani politician who has been a member of the National Assembly of Pakistan since February 2024. He was also a member of the Balochistan Provincial Assembly from 1993 - 1996 and held the portfolio as Minister for Food & Agriculture. He was also a member of the National Assembly of Pakistan from August 2018 till August 2023.

A member of the influential Jamali family, Mir Khan Muhammad Jamali also served as District Nazim Nasirabad from 2001 to 2005 and District Nazim Jafferabad from 2005 to 2009.

== Biography ==
Mir Khan Muhammad Jamali is son of famous Muslim League leader Haji Muhammad Murad Jamali, a close ally of Muhammad Ali Jinnah and his sister Fatima Jinnah.

== Political career ==
He was elected to the Provincial Assembly of Balochistan in 1993 as an independent candidate and served as Minister for Food & Agriculture, thereafter he was elected as District Nazim Nasirabad from 2001 to 2005 and of District Jafferabad from 2005 to 2009.

He was elected to the National Assembly of Pakistan from Constituency NA-261 (Jafarabad-cum-Sohbatpur) as a candidate of Pakistan Tehreek-e-Insaf in the 2018 Pakistani general election.

=== Resignation ===
In April 2022, he also resigned from the National Assembly seat along with all Tehreek-e-Insaaf members. However the resignation was not accepted and due to massive floods in Balochistan in 2022 he was granted special permission by Tehreek-e-Insaaf leadership to attend the assembly in order to represent the local issues owing to the flood situation.
