= PB-13 Nasirabad-I =

Constituency of the Provincial Assembly of Balochistan, Pakistan

- Constituency for the Provincial Assembly of Balochistan
- Region: Dera Murad Jamali (partly) and Chhatter Tehsil of Nasirabad District

Current constituency
- Party: Balochistan Awami Party
- Member: Mir Sikandar Ali
- Created from: PB-29 (Nasirabad-V)

PB-13 Nasirabad-I (پی بی-13 نصیر آباد-1) is a constituency of the Provincial Assembly of Balochistan.

== General elections 2024 ==
Provincial election 2024: PB-13 Nasirabad-I
Party	Candidate	Votes	%	±%
PPP	Mir Muhammad Sadiq Umrani	15,472	34.05	
BAP	Mir Sikandar Ali	9,565	21.05	
Independent	Mir Abdul Majid Abro	8,814	19.40	
PML(N)	Mir Shoukat Ali	8,649	19.04	
Others	Others (twenty nine candidates)	2,936	6.46	
Turnout		50,305	36.83	
Total valid votes		45,436	90.32	
Rejected ballots		4,869	9.68	
Majority		5,907	13.00	
Registered electors		136,586		

== General elections 2013 ==
Contesting candidates	Party affiliation	Votes polled
Mir Majid Abro	JQM	Won

== General elections 2008 ==
Contesting candidates	Party affiliation	Votes polled

== See also ==
- PB-12 Kachhi
- PB-14 Nasirabad-II
