= Jafar Khan Jamali =

Pakistani politician (1911–1967)

Mir Jafar Khan Jamali
- Born: 1911; Rojhan, Jhatpat area of Balochistan, British India
- Died: 7 April 1967 (aged 55–56); Karachi
- Known for: One of the prominent leaders of Pakistan Movement from Balochistan
- Relatives: Jamali family

Mir Jafar Khan Jamali (Note: Urdu: میر جعفر خان جمالی) (1911 – 7 April 1967) was a Pakistani politician and one of the founding fathers of the Pakistan Movement. The tribal chief of the Jamali family, he was a veteran of the All-India Muslim League from Balochistan province, Pakistan.

== Early life and career ==
Mir Jafar Khan Jamali was born in 1911 at Rojhan also known as Rojhan Jamali, Jhatpat area of Balochistan, British India.

He was an associate of Quaid-e-Azam Mohammad Ali Jinnah. He belonged to the Jamali tribe, a powerful and influential Baloch tribe. He actively participated in the struggle for the creation of Pakistan and independence of Pakistan in 1947. He also was an uncle and family leader of former prime minister of Pakistan Zafarullah Jamali who served as Prime Minister during Pervez Musharraf's regime.

The district of Jafarabad, Balochistan, is named after Jafar Khan Jamali.

== Leader of Pakistan Movement ==
Mir Jafar Khan Jamali is widely considered to be one of the key leaders that made the idea of Pakistan popular in Baluchistan. In British India, Mir Jafar Khan Jamali led delegations of notable political figures from Baluchistan to the All India Muslim League's annual sessions in Madras (1939), Lahore (1940), Karachi (1941), Allahabad (1942), and Delhi (1943).

=== Commemorative postage stamp ===
Pakistan Post Office issued a commemorative postage stamp to honor him in its 'Pioneers of Freedom' series in 2007.

== Mir Jafar Khan Jamali Foundation ==
Mir Jafar Khan Jamali Foundation (MJKJ-F) was founded in 1998 by a group of committed development workers and experts from backgrounds such as education, environment, water & sanitation, law, engineering, and women's activism. The foundation's vision was "A prosperous and progressive society where people have access to all basic amenities and facilities of life on equitable basis."

MJKJ-Foundation committed to come forward and join hands with the poor communities, stop environmental degradation and facilitate the communities in improving their living, social, cultural and education conditions of the communities without any discrimination of ethnic background and religion.

== Death ==
Jafar Khan Jamali died on 7 April 1967.
