= PB-17 Usta Muhammad =

Constituency of the Provincial Assembly of Balochistan, Pakistan

- Constituency for the Provincial Assembly of Balochistan
- Region: Usta Muhammad District

Current constituency
- Created from: PB-14 Jaffarabad-II 2018, before that PB-25 Jaffarabad-I 2013

PB-17 Usta Muhammad (پی بی-17 استا محمد) is a newly created constituency in 2023 of the Provincial Assembly of Balochistan.

== General elections 2024 ==
Provincial election 2024: PB-17 Usta Muhammad
Party	Candidate	Votes	%	±%
PPP	Faisal Khan Jamali	28,886	58.11	
BAP	Jan Mohammad Jamali	14,916	30.01	
JUI (F)	Muhammad Aslam	2,295	4.62	
Independent	Zareef Ahmed	1,124	2.26	
Others	Others (twenty one candidates)	2,488	4.90	
Turnout		53,575	37.30	
Total valid votes		49,709	92.78	
Rejected ballots		3,866	7.22	
Majority		13,970	28.10	
Registered electors		143,641		

== General elections 2013 ==
Contesting candidates	Party affiliation	Votes polled
Mir Jan Muhammad Khan Jamali	PML N	11000+

== General elections 2008 ==
Contesting candidates	Party affiliation	Votes polled
Sardar Rustam Khan Jamali	Ind	

== See also ==
- PB-16 Jafarabad
- PB-18 Khuzdar-I
