= USTA (disambiguation) =

USTA may refer to:

- United States Tennis Association
- United States Trademark Association, the former name of the International Trademark Association (INTA)
- United States Telecom Association
- United States Trotting Association, the head of harness racing in the United States.
- United States Tumbling & Trampoline Association

== See also ==
- Usta (disambiguation)
