= Rahat Jamali =

Pakistani politician (born 1965)

Member of the Provincial Assembly of Balochistan
- In office 1 June 2013 – 31 May 2018
- Constituency: PB-26 Jaffarabad-II

Member of the Senate of Pakistan
- Incumbent
- Assumed office 2024

Personal details
- Born: 10 March 1965 (age 61) Usta Muhammad, Balochistan, Pakistan
- Party: BAP (2025-present)
- Other political affiliations: PMLN (2024-2025); PPP (2020-2024); PMLN (2013-2018)
- Relations: Jamali family

Rahat Faiq Jamali (Urdu: راحت جمالی; born 10 March 1965) is a Pakistani politician who was a Member of the Provincial Assembly of Balochistan, from June 2013 to May 2018.

== Early life and education ==
Jamali was born on 10 March 1965 in Usta Mohammad, Balochistan, Pakistan.

She has done Master of Arts in Urdu from the University of Balochistan.

She is sister of Jan Muhammad Jamali.

== Political career ==
She was elected to the Provincial Assembly of Balochistan as a candidate of Pakistan Muslim League (N) from constituency PB-26 Jaffarabad-II in the 2013 Pakistani general election. She had secured 12,521 votes.

In September 2017, she was appointed as Provincial Minister of Balochistan for Labour in the cabinet of Chief Minister Nawab Sanaullah Khan Zehri, where she remained until resigning in January 2018.
