= Jérôme Badini =

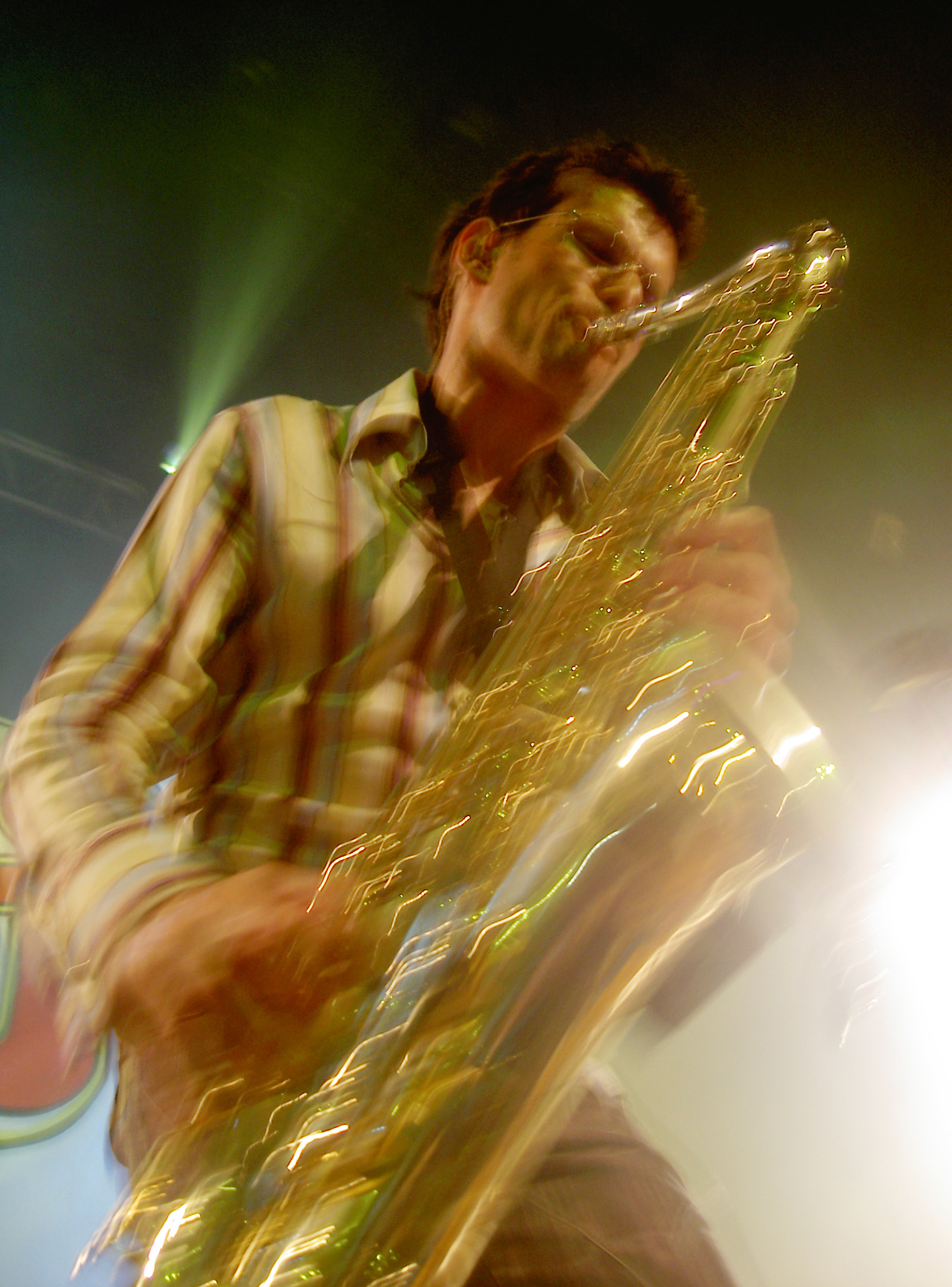
- Jérôme Badini at Paris-Bercy

Background information
- Genres: Electro-jazz
- Occupation(s): Saxophonist, composer, radio producer
- Instrument: Tenor saxophone
- Labels: Sony Music, Super Bad Trax
- Website: www.jeromebadini.com

Jérôme Badini is a French saxophonist, composer and founder of the electro-sax style. He was appointed jazz producer at Radio France in 2010.

== Biography ==
Jérôme Badini is son of Gérard Badini, a sax player and conductor who worked with Duke Ellington, Stan Getz and Dee Dee Bridgewater, among others, and grandson of an opera singer at La Scala.

Jérôme Badini started his career as a composer and played tenor saxophone in a number of jazz and pop bands in Europe. He is the founder of the electro-sax style, which has inspired a number of international artists. Fueled on Maceo Parker and Bennie Maupin, it has been said that the sax is a trance-maker in his hands. The style of Jérôme Badini can be described as a powerhouse sound, terse and hypnotic, like a DJ at a bank of turntables, spinning the melody into a tight, seductive frenzy. He played in many of the most famous clubs and concert halls in the world, including Ibiza, New York, Miami and Paris.

In 2001, he met with Alexkid through Dimitri From Paris and composed with him the ballad Trindade for Trip Do Brasil (Sony Music). In 2002, with David Duriez, he recorded Get On Down (2020 Vision). In 2004, he has composed and produced his first album, 'Round The Clock (Super Bad Trax), a 12 track journey to the enchanted world of Super Bad, the tenor sax adventurer!

In 2006, he has worked for the first time with his father's orchestra, mixing and producing Scriabin's Groove, setting Alexander Scriabin piano pieces opposite their transpositions into the idiom of jazz. In 2007, Jean-Philippe Audin (VideoCello), Jérôme Badini (ElectroSax) and Judith Darmont (VideoKeyboard) created the MovieSonic concept, mixing on stage music, photo and video triggered through their digitally enhanced instruments.

Since 2010, Jérôme Badini is producer at Radio France and presents the radio show Les légendes du jazz, on France Musique.

== Discography ==
- Trip Do Brasil (Sony Music, 2001)
- Get On Down (2020 Vision, 2002)
- Foreground (Super Bad Trax / IC Music, 2003)
- 'Round The Clock (Super Bad Trax / IC Music, 2004)
- Scriabin's Groove (Super Bad Trax, 2006)
