= Usta (name) =

Usta may refer to the following people:

== Given name ==
- Usta Murad (1570–1640), corsair captain and later Dey of Tunis

== Surname ==
- Berkin Usta (2000–2025), Turkish Olympian alpine skier
- Fuat Usta (born 1972), Turkish association football coach and former player
- Hisam-ud-din Usta (1910–1987), Indian artist
- Jorge García Usta (1960–2005), Colombian novelist (surname is not "Usta" but García)
- Sabahattin Usta (born 1990), Turkish football player
- Suat Usta (born 1981), Turkish football player
