= PB-16 Jafarabad =

Constituency of the Provincial Assembly of Balochistan, Pakistan

- Constituency for the Provincial Assembly of Balochistan
- Region: Jafarabad District

Current constituency
- Party: Jamaat-e-Islami Pakistan
- Member: Abdul Majeed Badini
- Created from: PB-26 (Nasirabad-II)

PB-16 Jafarabad (پی بی-16 جعفرآباد) is a constituency of the Provincial Assembly of Balochistan.

== General elections 2024 ==
Provincial election 2024: PB-16 Jafarabad
Party	Candidate	Votes	%	±%
JI	Abdul Majeed Badini	15,386	33.17	
PPP	Rahat Jamali	14,326	30.88	
PML(N)	Umar Khan Jamali	9,972	21.50	
Independent	Hassan Ali Jamali	2,746	5.92	
Others	Others (twenty nine candidates)	3,959	8.53	
Turnout		50,003	36.68	
Total valid votes		46,389	92.77	
Rejected ballots		3,614	7.23	
Majority		1,060	2.29	
Registered electors		136,306		

== General elections 2013 ==
Contesting candidates	Party affiliation	Votes polled

== General elections 2008 ==
Contesting candidates	Party affiliation	Votes polled

== See also ==
- PB-15 Sohbatpur
- PB-17 Usta Muhammad
