= PB-15 Sohbatpur =

Constituency of the Provincial Assembly of Balochistan, Pakistan

- Constituency for the Provincial Assembly of Balochistan
- Region: Sohbatpur District

Current constituency
- Party: PML(N)
- Member: Mir Saleem Ahmed Khoso
- Created from: PB-27 (Nasirabad-III)

PB-15 Sohbatpur (پی بی-15 صحبت پور) is a constituency of the Provincial Assembly of Balochistan.

== General elections 2024 ==
Provincial election 2024: PB-15 Sohbatpur
Party	Candidate	Votes	%	±%
PML(N)	Mir Saleem Ahmed Khoso	25,102	53.66	
PPP	Muhammad Douran	16,143	34.51	
Independent	Mir Iqbal Ahmed Khan Bajrani	1,423	3.04	
NP	Rahib Khan	1,295	2.77	
Others	Others (sixteen candidates)	2,816	6.02	
Turnout		49,838	42.96	
Total valid votes		46,779	93.86	
Rejected ballots		3,059	6.14	
Majority		8,959	19.15	
Registered electors		116,004		

== General elections 2013 ==
Contesting candidates	Party affiliation	Votes polled

== General elections 2008 ==
Contesting candidates	Party affiliation	Votes polled

== See also ==
- PB-14 Nasirabad-II
- PB-16 Jafarabad
