= Usta (tribe) =

Sindhi tribe

Usta or Ousta
اوستا

Regions with significant populations
- Sindh, Balochistan

Languages
- Sindhi

Religion
- Islam

Related ethnic groups
- Soomro, Abra, Sindhis of Balochistan

Usta (Sindhi: اوستا) also called Osta and Ousta is a branch of the Sindhi Soomra tribe. They are found in Sindh and Balochistan provinces of Pakistan. They mainly live in Jacobabad, Shikarpur and Usta Muhammad districts.

== Etymology ==
Usta tribe is a branch of the Soomro tribe. Usto derives from the Persian word Ustad (Sindhi: استاد) meaning teacher, master, expert artisan, or mason. Therefore, a skilled artisan is called Usto. Anyone who was an expert teacher or master artisan was called Ustad. The descendants of that expert came to be known as Usto. It is said that when the Soomra dynasty declined, they started working in different professions. Those who became skilled in carpentry were called Usto. Later on, this became a full-fledged caste.

== Usta Muhammad District ==
The Usta tribe founded the city of Usta Muhammad which later gave its name to the Usta Muhammad District of Balochistan.
