= Khalid Hussain Magsi =

Pakistani politician

Ministry of Information Technology and Telecommunication
- Incumbent
- Assumed office 24 April 2025
- President: Asif Ali Zardari
- Prime Minister: Shehbaz Sharif

Member of the National Assembly of Pakistan
- Incumbent
- Assumed office 29 February 2024
- Constituency: NA-254 Nasirabad-cum-Kachhi-cum-Jhal Magsi
- In office 13 August 2018 – 10 August 2023
- Constituency: NA-260 (Nasirabad-cum-Kachhi-cum-Jhal Magsi)
- In office 9 May 2016 – 31 May 2018
- Constituency: NA-267 (Kachhi-cum-Jhal Magsi)

Personal details
- Born: February 2, 1960 (age 66)
- Party: BAP (2018-present)
- Other political affiliations: PMLN (2014-2018); IND (2013-2014)
- Relations: Zulfikar Ali Magsi(brother) Mir Nadir Ali Khan Magsi(brother) Nawabzada Tariq Magsi(brother) Mir Aamir Ali Khan Magsi (Brother)
- Children: Nawabzada Jaffer Magsi

Khalid Hussain Magsi (Urdu: خالد حسین مگسی; born 2 February 1960) is a Pakistani politician who has been a member of the National Assembly of Pakistan since February 2024. Previously he was a member of the National Assembly from June 2013 to September 2014, from May 2016 to May 2018 and from August 2018 till August 2023.

== Early life ==
He was born on 2 February 1960.

== Political career ==
He was elected District nazim of Jhal Magsi in 2005.

He was elected to the National Assembly of Pakistan as an independent candidate from Constituency NA-267 (Kachhi-cum-Jhal Magsi) in the 2013 Pakistani general election. He received 42,240 votes and defeated an independent candidate, Abdul Raheem Rind.

In September 2014, Balochistan Election Tribunal declared the election as null and void and ordered re-election in the constituency. He was re-elected to the National Assembly as a candidate of Pakistan Muslim League (N) (PML-N) from Constituency NA-267 (Kachhi-cum-Jhal Magsi) in the by-elections held in April 2016. He received 29,630 votes and defeated Yar Muhammad Rind, a candidate of Pakistan Tehreek-e-Insaf (PTI).

In April 2018, he quit PML-N and joined the newly created Balochistan Awami Party (BAP).

He was re-elected to the National Assembly as a candidate of BAP from Constituency NA-260 (Nasirabad-cum-Kachhi-cum-Jhal Magsi) in the 2018 Pakistani general election. In the 2014 general election, he contested from Constituency NA-254 on a BAP ticket, defeating Nizam ud Din Lehri of Jamiat Ulema-e-Islam (F) by a significant margin to secure the seat.

=== Federal Minister for Science and Technology ===
On March 7, 2025, Magsi was inducted into the cabinet of Prime Minister Shehbaz Sharif. He formally assumed office as the Federal Minister for Science and Technology on March 10, 2025.
