= Dera Allah Yar =

Dera Allah Yar ڈیرہ اللہ یار Jhatpat
- City
- Dera Allah Yar
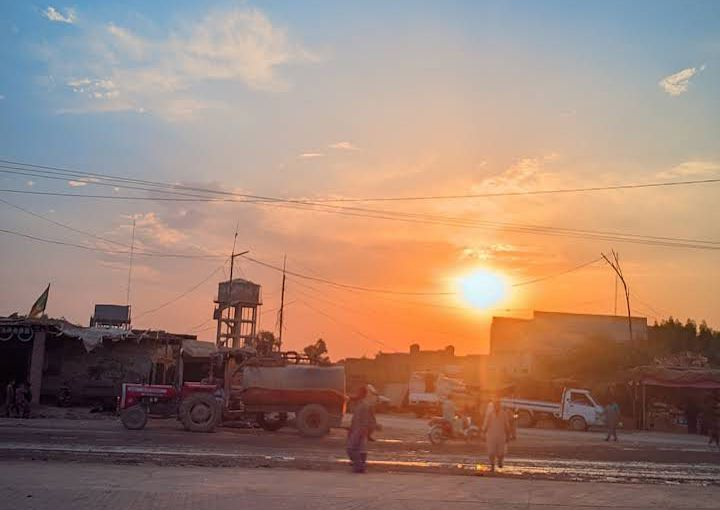

- Location within Balochistan, Pakistan Location within Pakistan Location within South Asia Location within Asia
- Coordinates: 28.376879°N 68.347235°E
- Country: Pakistan
- Province: Balochistan
- District: Jafarabad District
- Division: Nasirabad

Government
  - Type: Municipal Corporation
  - Mayor: Asfand Yar
  - Deputy Mayor: Vacant
  - Deputy Commissioner: Khalid Khan

Area
  - City: 690 km^{2} (270 sq mi)
- Elevation: 56 m (184 ft)

Population (2023)
  - City: 98,761
  - Rank: 130th in Pakistan
  - Density: 438.4/km^{2} (1,135/sq mi)
- Time zone: UTC+05:00 (PKT)
  - Summer (DST): DST is not observed
- ZIP Code: 80500
- NWD (area) code: 8289
- ISO 3166 code: PK-BA
- Highways: N-65

Dera Allah Yar (Urdu: ڈیرہ اللہ یار), formerly known as Jhatpat (Urdu: جھٹ پٹ), is a city and the headquarters of the Jafarabad District located in Pakistan's Balochistan province. It lies 300 km from the provincial capital Quetta. According to 2023 Pakistani census population of the Jhatpat subdivision is 302,498.

== History ==
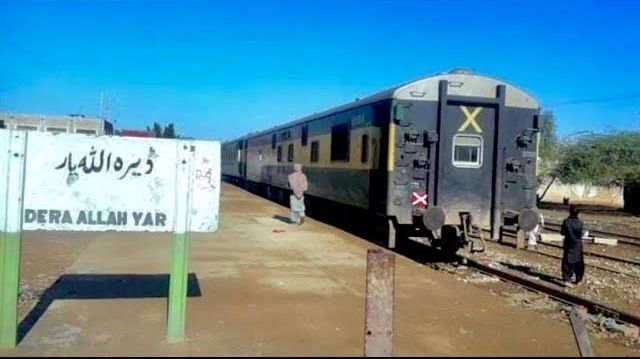
Dera Allah Yar station in 2024

The city of Dera Allah Yar is named after Allah Yar Khan Khosa, a prominent political leader of the area, whose leadership and influence played an important role in the development and identity of the region. The railway station is on the Rohri–Chaman Line.

== Demographics ==
Population

Historical population
Year	Pop.	±%
1972	2,332	—
1981	6,730	+188.6%
1998	38,371	+470.1%
2017	80,958	+111.0%
2023	98,761	+22.0%

According to 2023 census, Dera Allah Yar had a population of 98,761.

Languages

Languages of Dera Allahyar Subdivision (2023 Pakistani census)
1. Balochi (58.8%)
2. Sindhi (26.5%)
3. Saraiki (9.32%)
4. Brahui (3.12%)
5. Pashto (0.65%)
6. Urdu (0.45%)
7. Others (1.18%)

According to 2023 Pakistani census, Urban Population of Dera Allahyar Subdivision is 98,761 of which Balochi 58.81%, Sindhi 26.47%, Saraiki 9.32%, Brahvi 3.12%, Pashto 0.65%, Urdu 0.45% and an additional 1.18% of the population spoke other Languages of Pakistan.

== Economy ==
Dera Allah Yar is a growing commercial and agricultural hub in Balochistan, Pakistan, where the local economy relies heavily on agriculture, rice milling, and livestock.

Economic Sectors

- Agriculture: Farming is the main occupation in the suburban villages surrounding the city. Key crops include wheat, rice, maize, bajra (pearl millet), and barley.
- Industry & Trade: The city is home to several major rice mills. Commercial shops supply farm machinery, construction equipment, seeds, and fertilizers.
- Livestock: Cattle farming plays a vital role in the local economy, with numerous livestock operations supplying cattle and dairy products to regional markets.

Future Growth: Ongoing regional infrastructure projects and investments in trade corridors are expected to strengthen the city's economic activity and increase its contribution to regional and national economic growth.

== Transportation ==
Dera Allah Yar, the headquarters of Jafarabad District in Balochistan, is well connected to the rest of Pakistan through an extensive network of national highways, regional roads, and railway lines. Its strategic location makes it an important transportation and transit hub between Balochistan and Sindh.

🛣️ Road Transportation

Road travel is the primary and most flexible means of transportation to and from Dera Allah Yar. The city serves as an important transit point connecting Balochistan with major cities and towns in Sindh.

National Highway N-65: The N-65 is the main highway serving Dera Allah Yar. It connects the city with Jacobabad and Sukkur in Sindh and extends westward toward Quetta through Dera Murad Jamali, Sibi, and the Bolan Pass.

Dera Allah Yar–Jacobabad Bypass Road

The Dera Allah Yar–Jacobabad Bypass Road provides an additional regional road connection between Dera Allah Yar and Jacobabad. The bypass provides an alternative route for traffic travelling between Quetta and Jacobabad, allowing vehicles to bypass the urban area of Dera Allah Yar. It is particularly useful for commercial and heavy vehicles travelling between Balochistan and Sindh.

Bus and Van Services: Private bus and coach services operate regularly from Dera Allah Yar, providing connections to major cities and regional hubs such as Karachi, Quetta, Jacobabad, Sukkur, and Larkana.

Local Transportation: Public transport vans, auto-rickshaws, and local taxis provide transportation within the city and connect Dera Allah Yar with nearby towns, including Jacobabad, Sohbatpur, Dera Murad Jamali, and Usta Muhammad.

🚂 Rail Transportation

Dera Allah Yar is situated along the strategic Rohri–Chaman Railway Line, which forms an important railway connection between Sindh and Balochistan.

Dera Allah Yar Railway Station: The railway station serves the city and surrounding communities, providing passenger and freight railway connectivity along the route.
