= PB-12 Kachhi =

Constituency of the Provincial Assembly of Balochistan, Pakistan

- Constituency for the Provincial Assembly of Balochistan
- Region: Kachhi District

Current constituency
- Created from: PB-30 (Kachhi-I) and PB-32 (Kachhi-III)

PB-12 Kachhi (پی بی-12 کچّھی) is a constituency of the Provincial Assembly of Balochistan.

== General elections 2024 ==
Provincial election 2024: PB-12 Kachhi
Party	Candidate	Votes	%	±%
PML(N)	Mir Muhammad Asim Kurd	22,782	42.93	
PPP	Yar Muhammad Rind	18,020	33.96	
JUI (F)	Qazi Kifayat Ullah	5,388	10.15	
IPP	Moula Dad	1,804	3.40	
Independent	Abdul Raziq	1,559	2.94	
TLP	Syed Fakhar Imam	1,319	2.49	
Others	Others (twenty two candidates)	2,194	4.13	
Turnout		56,896	38.58	
Total valid votes		53,066	93.27	
Rejected ballots		3,830	6.73	
Majority		4,762	8.97	
Registered electors		147,474		

== General elections 2013 ==
Contesting candidates	Party affiliation	Votes polled

== General elections 2008 ==
Contesting candidates	Party affiliation	Votes polled

== See also ==
- PB-11 Jhal Magsi
- PB-13 Nasirabad-I
