= Zafarullah Khan Jamali =

Prime Minister of Pakistan from 2002 to 2004

- ظفراللہ خان جمالی
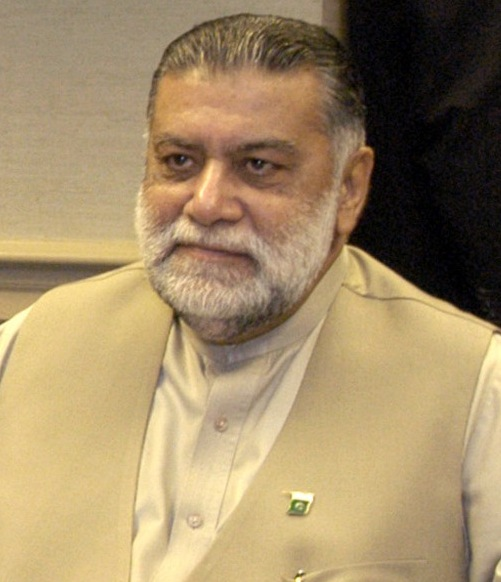
- Jamali in 2003

13th Prime Minister of Pakistan
- In office 23 November 2002 – 26 June 2004
- President: Pervez Musharraf
- Preceded by: Pervez Musharraf (as Chief Executive); Nawaz Sharif (as Prime Minister)
- Succeeded by: Chaudhry Shujaat Hussain

5th & 12th Chief Minister of Balochistan
- In office 9 November 1996 – 22 February 1997; Acting
- Governor: Imran Ullah Khan
- Preceded by: Zulfiqar Ali Khan Magsi
- Succeeded by: Akhtar Mengal
- In office 23 June 1988 – 24 December 1988
- Governor: Muhammad Musa
- Preceded by: Jam Ghulam Qadir Khan
- Succeeded by: Khuda Bakhsh Marri (acting)

Personal details
- Born: 1 January 1944 Jaffarabad, Baluchistan, British India
- Died: 2 December 2020 (aged 76) Rawalpindi, Punjab, Pakistan
- Citizenship: British Indian (1944-1947); Pakistani (1947-2020)
- Party: Pakistan Tehreek-e-Insaf (2018–2020)
- Other political affiliations: Pakistan Muslim League (N) (2013–2018); Pakistan Peoples Party (2008–2013); Pakistan Muslim League (Q) (2002–2008); Pakistan Muslim League (N) (1993–2002); Islami Jamhoori Ittehad (1988–1993); Pakistan Muslim League (1985–1988); Independent (1981–1985); Pakistan Peoples Party (1977–1981)
- Relations: Jamali family
- Education: Government College University; Punjab University

Mir Zafarullah Khan Jamali (Note: Urdu: میر ظفراللہ خان جمالی) (1 January 1944 – 2 December 2020) was a Pakistani politician who served as the 13th prime minister of Pakistan from 2002 to 2004. He was the first and only elected prime minister from Balochistan, Pakistan.

Born into the Jamali family, he was originally a supporter of the Pakistan People's Party and emerged from the politics of Balochistan under military governor Rahimuddin Khan during the 1970s. He became a national figure as part of the government of Nawaz Sharif, and was Chief Minister of Balochistan for two non-consecutive terms (from June–December 1988 and November 1996 –February 1997). Although he was a senior leader in the Pakistan Muslim League (PML) and Sharif's confidant, relations between Jamali and Sharif cooled and Jamali joined the Pakistan Muslim League (Q) after the 1999 military coup led by General Pervez Musharraf. In the 2002 general election, Jamali won his bid for the office of prime minister after his supporters and colleagues crossed party lines to support him.

On 21 November 2002 Jamali was appointed the 13th prime minister of Pakistan-designate. He was sworn in on 23 November 2002, serving until he unexpectedly announced his resignation in 2004. He is the fifth shortest-serving democratically elected prime minister in the history of Pakistan.

== Early life and education ==
Zafarullah Jamali was born on 1 January 1944 to the Jamali family, a political, religious and landlord family in Rojhan village of Commissariat Baluchistan of the British Indian Empire, now Jaffarabad District in Balochistan, Pakistan.

Jamali received his early education at Lawrence College, Murree and A-levels from Aitchison College, Lahore. Jamali was a great hockey player in his time. He then studied at Government College, Lahore for a bachelor's degree. He received his master's degree in political science at the University of the Punjab in 1965.

== Political career ==
Jamali began his political career in 1970 and joined PPP. Jamali took part in the 1970 Pakistani general election for the first time but lost it.

He was elected to the Provincial Assembly of Balochistan in the 1977 Pakistani general election on a PPP ticket. He was appointed a provincial minister in the provincial cabinet of Nawab Mohammad Khan Barozai in Balochistan. He briefly held portfolios for the departments of Food, Information, Law and Parliamentary Affairs.

After the imposition of martial law in Pakistan by General Zia-ul-Haq, he was allied to Zia-ul-Haq. Jamali was appointed as a state minister in the federal cabinet by Zia.

Jamali was elected as the member of the National Assembly of Pakistan in the 1985 Pakistani general election from Naseerabad constituency and was inducted into the federal cabinet of Junejo and given the portfolio of Federal Minister of water and power.

Jamali was appointed as the caretaker Chief Minister of Balochistan in 1988 after General Zia-ul-Haq dismissed the government of Junejo.

Jamali was re-elected as the member of the provincial assembly of Balochistan in the 1988 Pakistani general election and became the chief minister of Balochistan.

He was elected as the member of the Senate of Pakistan in 1994 and again in 1997.

Jamali ran for the seat of National Assembly in the 1990 Pakistani general elections, but was defeated by a PPP candidate.

He was re-elected as the member of the Provincial Assembly in the 1993 Pakistani general elections on the PML ticket and defeated a PPP nominee. Jamali was re-appointed caretaker as the chief minister of Balochistan in 1997.

== Premiership (2002–2004) ==
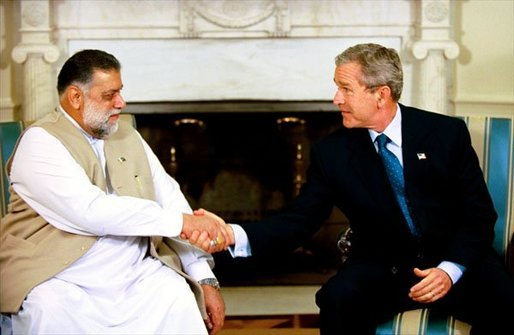
Prime Minister Jamali shaking hands with U.S. President George W. Bush, 2003

In July 2002, Jamali joined the Pakistan Muslim League's breakaway Pakistan Muslim League (Q).

He was re-elected as the member of the National Assembly of Pakistan in the 2002 Pakistani general election.

In November 2002, Jamali became the 13th Prime Minister of Pakistan by a simple majority for five years for the first time after securing 188 votes out of 342 seats in the National Assembly of Pakistan. He was the first politician from Balochistan to become prime minister of Pakistan.

Since no party had an exclusive mandate, his election as prime minister followed weeks of negotiation. He formed a coalition government with MQM, MMA, PPPP and the splinter group of the Pakistan Muslim League. He oversaw Pakistan's transition from two-party to multi-party democracy.

=== Foreign policy ===
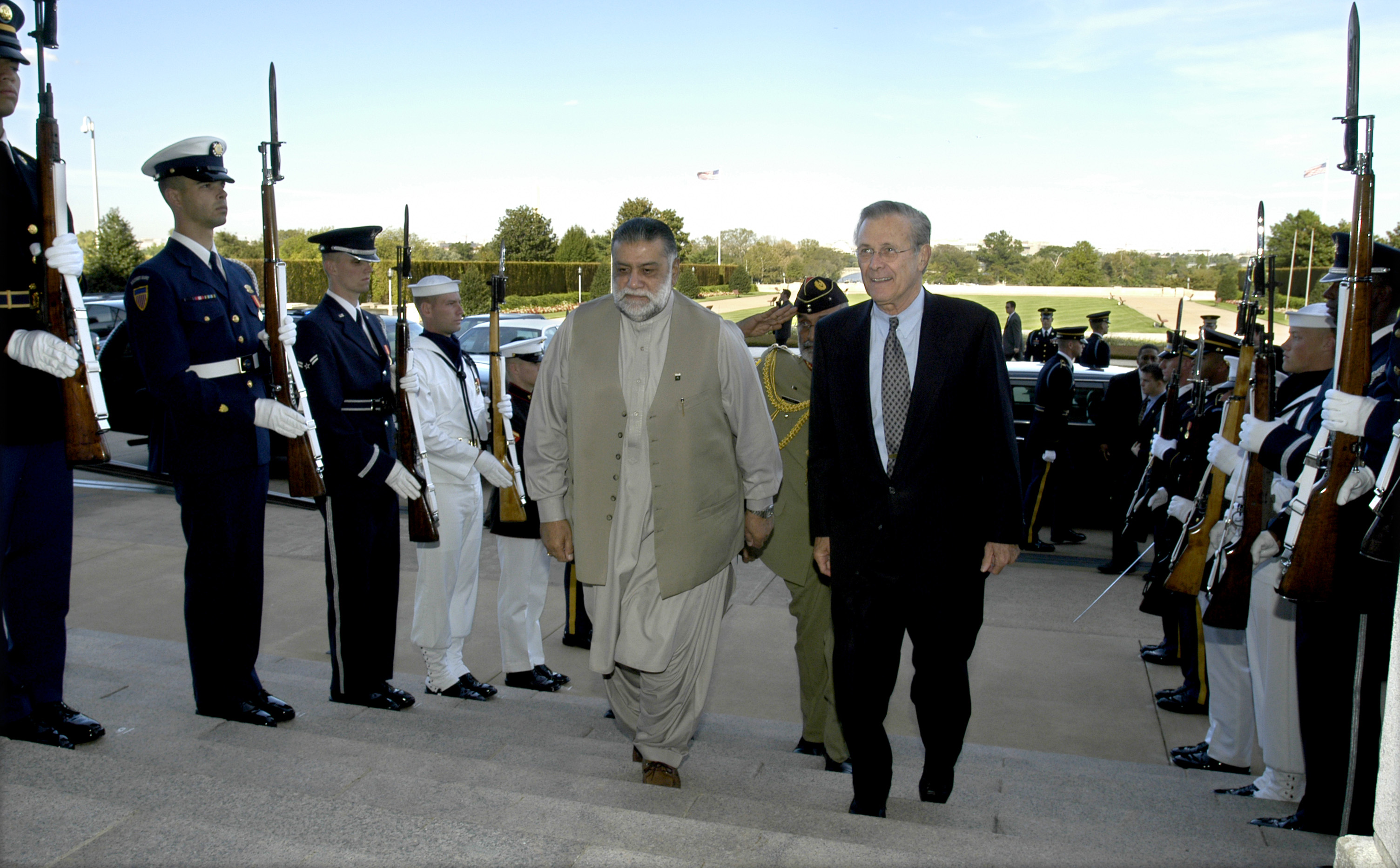
Prime Minister Jamali with U.S. Secretary of Defense Donald Rumsfeld at the Pentagon

In 2004, Jamali visited Afghanistan, which was the first highest-level visit from Pakistan since the fall of the Taliban government in 2001 which was an ally of Pakistan. Jamali supported Hamid Karzai as President of Afghanistan and assured him of cooperation between the government of both countries in everything, from trade to terrorism. Jamali announced donations of 300 buses and trucks, scholarships for Afghan students and aid for improvement of road, railway and hospital projects in Afghanistan.

In October 2003 Jamali visited the United States, meeting with President George W. Bush and vowing to support the U.S. in the war on terror.

Jamali vowed to improve relations with India immediately after assuming office and procuring a peace agreement and cease-fire in the disputed Kashmir region. He appointed a special envoy to improve relations and lessen tensions between the two countries which had arisen during the 1990s and early 2000s.

=== Resignation ===
In June 2004, Jamali abruptly announced his resignation on television after a three-hour meeting with Musharraf. There had been rumours of Jamali's strained relationship with Musharraf on the execution of government policies. According to media reports, resignation became inevitable when Musharraf became unhappy with Jamali's performance and his failure to strongly endorse Musharraf's policies. Jamali was the fifth shortest-serving prime minister of Pakistan.

The Muttahida Majlis-e-Amal was initially surprised; the mainstream parties saw Jamali's resignation as "forced and [a] humiliation for democracy" and "bad for the future". With his surprise announcement, Jamali dissolved the cabinet and nominated his party's president Shujaat Hussain as interim prime minister. Weeks after his resignation, it was learned that it came as the result of deteriorating relations with Hussain.

== Post-prime ministership ==
After resigning, Jamali pursued his passion for field hockey. In 2004, he became president of the Pakistan Hockey Federation and vowed to solve the problems facing the Pakistan Hockey Federation and revive the Pakistan men's national field hockey team. He previously played for Punjab province, acted as Chief-de-Mission for the 1984 Summer Olympics and was chief selector for the national team.

In 2008, he resigned as its president after the national hockey team performed poorly at the Olympic Games.

In May 2013, he joined the Pakistan Muslim League (N). He remained a member of the National Assembly of Pakistan from 2013 until his resignation in May 2018.

In June 2018, he quit PML-N and joined Pakistan Tehreek-e-Insaf (PTI).

== Death ==
On 29 November 2020, Jamali was admitted to Armed Forces Institute of Cardiology and put on a ventilator after suffering a cardiac arrest. He died in Rawalpindi on 2 December 2020 at the age of 76. On 3 December 2020, after funeral prayers, Jamali was laid to rest in his native village.

== Notes ==
Political offices
Preceded by Ghulam Qadir Khan	Chief Minister of Balochistan; 1988	Succeeded by Khuda Bux Marri; Acting
Preceded by Zulfikar Ali Magsi	Chief Minister of Balochistan; Acting; 1996–1997	Succeeded by Akhtar Mengal
Preceded by Pervez Musharraf as chief executive of Pakistan	Prime Minister of Pakistan; 2002–2004	Succeeded by Chaudhry Shujaat Hussain
Diplomatic posts
Preceded by Sher Bahadur Deuba	Chairperson of SAARC; 2004	Succeeded by Khaleda Zia
