= Sohbatpur District =

District in Balochistan, Pakistan

Sohbutpur ضلع صحبت پور
- District of Balochistan
- Country: Pakistan
- Province: Balochistan
- Division: Nasirabad
- Established: May 2013
- Headquarters: Sohbatpur

Government
  - Type: District Administration
  - Deputy Commissioner: Fareeda Tareen
  - District Police Officer: SP Abdul Hameed (PSP, 48CTP)
  - District Health Officer: N/A

Area
  - Total: 802 km^{2} (310 sq mi)

Population (2023)
  - Total: 240,106
  - Density: 299/km^{2} (775/sq mi)
  - Urban: 14,728
  - Rural: 225,378

Literacy
  - Literacy rate: Total: (41.02%); Male: (53.26%); Female: (28.42%)
- Time zone: UTC+5 (PST)

Sohbatpur District (Urdu: ضلع صحبت پور) is a district in the Pakistani province of Balochistan.

It was created in May 2013 from parts of Jafarabad District.

The district has a population of over 240‚000.

== Geography ==
The district borders the Naseerabad, Jafarabad and Dera Bugti districts of Balochistan, and Jacobabad and Kashmore districts of Sindh.

== Administration ==
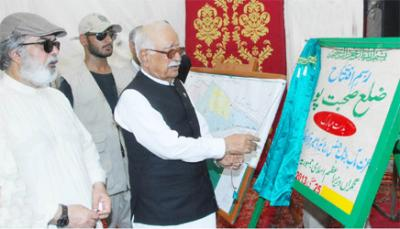
District Sohbatpur Inauguration in May 2013 by then Caretaker Prime Minister Mir Hazar Khan Khosa.

Sohbatpur District consists of the following Tehsils:

| Tehsil | Area (km²) | Pop. (2023) | Density (ppl/km²) (2023) | Literacy rate (2023) | Union Councils |
|---|---|---|---|---|---|
| Faridabad Tehsil | 137 | 68,948 | 503.27 | 41.09% | ... |
| Hairdin Tehsil | 73 | 16,891 | 231.38 | 42.60% | ... |
| Manjipur Tehsil | 82 | 23,624 | 288.10 | 43.85% | ... |
| Saeed Muhammad Tehsil | 77 | 18,175 | 236.04 | 45.90% | ... |
| Panhwar Tehsil | 99 | 47,624 | 481.05 | 35.38% | ... |
| Sohbatpur Tehsil | 334 | 64,844 | 194.14 | 42.30% | ... |

The district has eight police stations.

== Demographics ==
=== Population ===
Historical population
| Year | Pop. | ±% p.a. |
|---|---|---|
| 1951 | N/A | — |
| 1961 | N/A | — |
| 1972 | N/A | — |
| 1981 | N/A | — |
| 1998 | 141,527 | — |
| 2017 | 200,426 | +1.85% |
| 2023 | 240,106 | +3.06% |

As of the 2023 census, Sohbatpur district has 33,734 households and a population of 240,106. The district has a sex ratio of 103.06 males to 100 females and a literacy rate of 41.02%: 53.26% for males and 28.42% for females. 103,225 (42.99% of the surveyed population) are under 10 years of age. 14,728 (6.13%) live in urban areas.

=== Religion ===
Religions in Sohbatpur district (2023)
| Religion | Percent |
| Islam | 98.99% |
| Hinduism | 0.75% |
| Other | 0.26% |

In the 2023 census, Islam was the predominant religion with 98.99%, while Hindus constituted 0.75% of the population.

=== Language ===
Languages of Sohbatpur district (2023)
1. Balochi (67.4%)
2. Sindhi (17.6%)
3. Brahui (7.92%)
4. Saraiki (6.38%)
5. Others (0.68%)

At the time of the 2023 census, 67.39% of the population spoke Balochi, 17.63% Sindhi, 7.92% Brahui and 6.38% Saraiki as their first language.

== See also ==
- Tehsils of Pakistan
  - Tehsils of Balochistan, Pakistan
- Districts of Pakistan
  - Districts of Balochistan, Pakistan
- Divisions of Pakistan
  - Divisions of Balochistan, Pakistan
