= Usta Muhammad =

Pakistani city and administrative area

Usta Muhammad اوستہ محمد
- Town
- Location within Balochistan, Pakistan Location within Pakistan
- Coordinates: 28°10′42″N 68°2′35″E
- Country: Pakistan
- Province: Balochistan
- District: Usta Muhammad District

Government
  - Type: Municipal Corporation
  - Mayor: Seat Vacant

Area
  - Town: 978 km^{2} (378 sq mi)

Population (2023)
  - Town: 64,632
  - Density: 66.1/km^{2} (171/sq mi)
- Languages Spoken: Balochi, Sindhi, Brahui, Saraiki

Usta Muhammad (Urdu: اُستہ محمد, Balochi: اُستہ محمد) is a city, a sub-division, and the District headquarters of Usta Muhammad District in Balochistan, Pakistan. The city has an area of 978 km^{2}.

== History ==
It was originally a city founded by the Usta branch of the Soomro Tribe. They were initially masters and skilled craftsmen of wood carving. Because they were masters (Ustads) of their craft, they began to be called "Usta" by caste. former minister Dur Muhammad Usto used to say that Ustas are Soomras.

== Demographics ==
=== Population ===
Historical population
Year	Pop.	±% p.a.
1951	2,089	—
1961	3,341	+4.81%
1972	6,605	+6.39%
1981	12,016	+6.88%
1998	38,946	+7.16%
2017	77,097	+3.66%
2023	64,632	−2.90%

According to 2023 census, Usta Muhammad had a population of 64,632. According to the 2017 Census of Pakistan, the city municipal corporation population was approximately 76,753, while the tehsil population was 186,226.

=== Religion ===
Relative to their share of the overall Balochistan population (0.4 per cent), the city of Usta Muhammad has a significant Hindu community, forming approximately 4.2 per cent of the population as of the 2017 census.

Religious groups in Usta Muhammad City (1941 & 2017)
Religious group	1941		2017	
Religious group	Pop.	%	Pop.	%
Islam	1,154	59.95%	73,103	95.24%
Hinduism	688	35.74%	3,227	4.2%
Sikhism	77	4%	—N/a	—N/a
Christianity	6	0.31%	75	0.1%
Others	0	0%	348	0.45%
Total population	1,925	100%	76,753	100%

== Governance ==
The city has one Municipal Corporation where the Chief Administrator sits, and an Office of the Assistant Commissioner who controls the city's executive works and Price Control.

Unions in the district are Ali-abad, Faiz-abad, Khanpur, Bari Shaakh, Mehrabpur, Piral-abad, Qabula, Samaji, Sobarani, Usta Muhammad I, Usta Muhammad II, and Usta Muhammad III.

== Geography ==
Usta Mohammad is in the Kachhi plain basin, with an average altitude of about 55 meters. Annual rainfall is about 90mm, of which 60mm falls in winter (November–May). Winters are cold, and summers are dry and hot.

== Economy ==
As of 2020;

People in the city area of Usta Muhammad are much more noble and have businesses in commercial places. Mostly wealthy people here own rice mills, and some have Estate Agency businesses. People in the city who are poor are mostly labourers.

In remote areas, some people are landlords while others have small businesses.

The people of the district are predominantly poor, with inadequate access to medical supplies and facilities.

Crops include rice, wheat, and sorghum. A 2002 survey determined that the incidence of Sporisorium sorghi, the causal organism of sorghum grain smut, reached 7% in Usta Mohammad. A survey of rice farmers found that 33% were illiterate, 55% farmed from 12 to 40 acres of land, and 58.3% were tenant farmers. Some farms raise cattle, sheep, and goats. Usta Mohammad has Railwaystation railways boundary connected Usta to Larkana (sindh) Usta Mohammad is 2nd biggest Business city of Balochistan. Usta is 2nd most populated city in Balochistan province.

== Education ==
The city has an Agri-Development Institute and a Government Degree College. Every student went to the other cities for their studies because there were nothing any Study system like (library, Hostels and many other facilities.

== Transport ==
Since 1946, Usta Muhammad boasted an operational railway station connecting it to Garhi Khairo, Shahdadkot, Larkana. However, the railway station ceased functioning in 2008. Presently, Usta Muhammad is accessible by road, linking it to Garhi Khairo, Dera Allah Yar, and Jhal Magsi. Notably, the town is not directly connected to any highway or motorway. The nearest Motorway, M-8, is situated in Shahdadkot, approximately 52 kilometers away, while N-65 Highway is located near Dera Allah Yar, approximately 40 kilometers away. Direct bus routes are available to Karachi Hyderabad Larkana and Quetta, while mini-vans ply routes to Jacobabad, Quetta, Sukkur, Dera Murad Jamali, and Shahdadkot.

== See also ==
- Jaffarabad District
- Dera Allah Yar
- Garhi Khairo
- Jacobabad
- Shahdadkot
- Districts of Pakistan
  - Districts of Balochistan, Pakistan
- Divisions of Pakistan
  - Divisions of Balochistan, Pakistan
