= Dera Murad Jamali =

Dera Murad Jamali: ڊيرا مراد جماليی (Sindhi); ڈیرہ مراد جمالی (Balochi)
- City
- Dera Murad Jamali
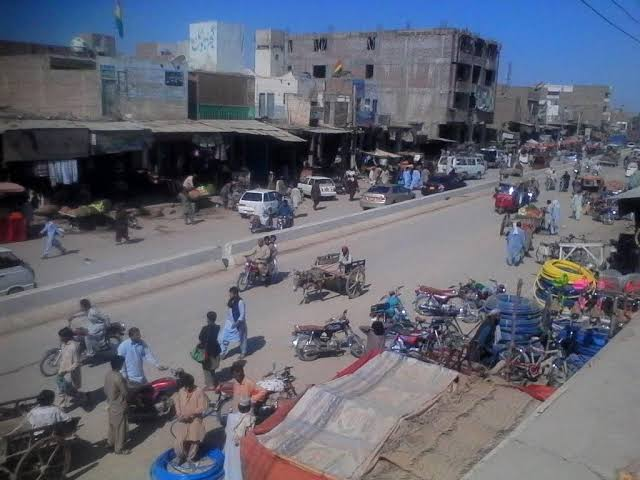
- Dera Murad Jamali City

- Dera Murad Jamali highlighted in red

- Location within Balochistan, Pakistan Location within Pakistan
- Coordinates: 28°32′40″N 68°13′14″E
- Country: Pakistan
- Province: Balochistan
- District: Nasirabad District
- Old name: Tipull
- Preceded: Kalat District (1954-1974)
- Succeeded: Nasirabad District (1974-present)

Government
  - Type: Municipal Committee
  - Chairman: Safdar Khan
  - Vice-Chairman: Shah Muhammad
  - MPA: Sadiq Khan Umrani

Area
  - City: 281 km^{2} (108 sq mi)
- Elevation: 67 m (220 ft)

Population (2023 census)
  - City: 106,952
  - Rank: 118th in Pakistan
  - Density: 945.99/km^{2} (2,450.1/sq mi)
- Time zone: UTC+05:00 (PKT)
  - Summer (DST): DST is not observed
- ZIP Code: 80700
- NWD (area) code: 0838
- ISO 3166 code: PK-BA
- Highways: N-65

Dera Murad Jamali (Sindhi: ڊيرا مراد جماليی; Balochi and Urdu: ڈیرہ مراد جمالی), often abbreviated as D.M. Jamali, is a city and district headquarters located in Nasirabad District, Balochistan, Pakistan. It is also the divisional headquarters of Nasirabad Division. In 1954 Dera Murad Jamali was part of Kalat District until Nasirabad District was created in 1974.

== History ==
Its original name was Temple Dera, named after Captain H. M. Temple, a career British civil servant, who served as the Political Agent for Sibi from 1891 to 1892. Among the local population it is still known as 'Tipul', a corruption of the word 'temple'.

In 1974 Dera Murad Jamali became headquarter of newly created Nasirabad District split from Kalat District.

== Demographics ==
=== Population ===
Historical population
Year	Pop.	±% p.a.
1981	9,133	—
1998	38,431	+8.82%
2017	96,591	+4.97%
2023	106,952	+1.71%

According to 2023 census, Dera Murad Jamali had a population of 106,952.

=== Languages ===
According to 2023 Pakistani census, the Urban Population of Dera Murad Jamali Subdivision is 265,822 of which 33.57% spoke Sindhi, 25.46% spoke Balochi, 22.27% spoke Saraiki, 18.08% spoke Brahvi, and an additional 0.62% of the population spoke other National languages of Pakistan.

Languages of Dera Murad Jamali City (2023 Pakistani census)
1. Sindhi (33.6%)
2. Balochi (25.5%)
3. Saraiki (22.3%)
4. Brahvi (18.1%)
5. Others (0.62%)

== Dera Murad Jamali Railway Station ==
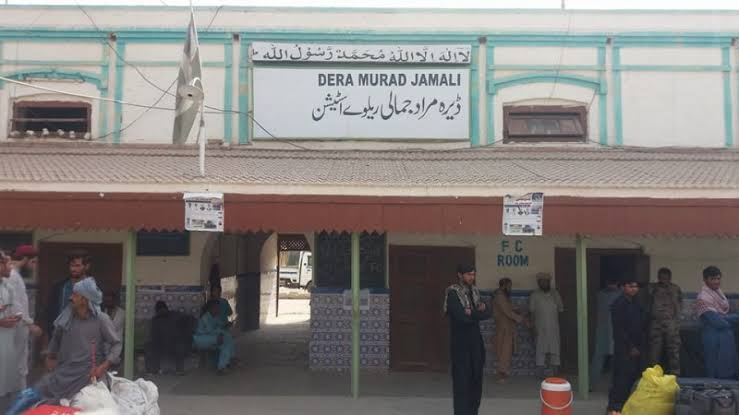
DMJ Train Station in 2024

The railway station is on the Rohri–Chaman Line.
