= Usta Muhammad District =

District in Balochistan, Pakistan

Usta Muhammad استا محمد
- District of Balochistan
- Usta Muhammad
- Map of Balochistan with Usta Muhammad District highlighted
- Coordinates: 28°10′42″N 68°2′35″E
- Country: Pakistan
- Province: Balochistan
- Division: Nasirabad
- Established: September 01 2022
- Headquarters: Usta Mohammad

Government
  - Type: District Administration
  - Deputy Commissioner: Muhammad Ramzan
  - District Police Officer: Gulam Hussain Bajoi
  - MPA: Sardarzada Mir Faisal Khan Jamali

Area
  - Total: 953 km^{2} (368 sq mi)

Population (2023)
  - Total: 292,060
  - Density: 306/km^{2} (794/sq mi)

Literacy
  - Literacy rate: Total: (38.17%); Male: (45.95%); Female: (30.30%)
- Time zone: UTC+5 (PST)
- Constituency Provincial: PB 17
- Website: Official site

Usta Muhammad (Urdu: استہ محمد, Balochi استا محمد) district lies in the southeastern part of the Pakistani province of Balochistan. It is named after Mulla Mohammad Khan Usto. Usta Mohammad city serves as the district headquarters.

== History ==
It was originally a city founded by the Usta tribe, They were initially masters and skilled craftsmen of wood carving. Because they were masters (Ustads) of their craft, they began to be called "Usta" by caste.

It was created in September 2022 by dividing Jaffarabad District.

== Climate ==
The district is situated in the Kachhi plain basin with an average elavation of about 55 meters. The Summers are very hot and dry and Winters are cold. The region receives very less annual rainfall of about 90mm. The region was also affected by flooding in 2007 after Cyclone Yemyin.

== Administration ==
The district is administratively subdivided into the following two Tehsils:

Tehsil	Area (km²)	Pop. (2023)	Density (ppl/km²) (2023)	Literacy rate (2023)	Union Councils	Municipal Corporation
Usta Muhammad Tehsil	399	210,870	528.50	38.17%	11	MCUsta
Gandakha Tehsil	554	81,190	146.55	24.59%	09	TC

== Demographics ==
=== Population ===
Historical population
Year	Pop.	±% p.a.
1951	...	—
1961	47,697	—
1972	74,316	+4.11%
1981	107,139	+4.15%
1998	160,230	+2.40%
2017	260,865	+2.60%
2023	292,060	+1.90%

According to 2023 census, Usta Muhammad District had a population of 292,060. At the time of the 2017 census the district had 27,372 households and a population of 260,865. Usta Muhammad district had a sex ratio of 963 females per 1000 males and a literacy rate of 29.52% - 39.72% for males and 19.02% for females. 76,753 (29.42%) lived in urban areas. 94,009 (36.03%) were under 10 years of age.

=== Religion ===
Religions in Usta Muhammad district (2023)
Religion	Percent
Islam	97.73%
Hinduism	1.37%
Other or not stated	0.9%

Majority of the population follow Islam with a small minority practicing Hinduism. (Note: The district was formed by carving Usta Muhammad and Gandakha tehsil out of Jaffarabad district.)

=== Languages ===
Languages of Usta Muhammad district (2017)
1. Balochi (40.2%)
2. Sindhi (24.7%)
3. Saraiki (19.1%)
4. Brahui (14.3%)
5. Others (1.71%)

At the time of the 2017 census, 40.18% of the population spoke Balochi, 24.71% Sindhi, 19.05% Saraiki and 14.35% Brahui as their first language.
