= Nasirabad District =

Coordinates: 28°32′40″N 68°13′14″E

Naseerabad District ضلع نصیر آباد
- District of Balochistan
- Map of Balochistan with Nasirabad District highlighted
- Country: Pakistan
- Province: Balochistan
- Division: Nasirabad
- Established: 1974; 52 years ago
- Named for: Mir Nasir Khan I
- Headquarters: Dera Murad Jamali
- Administrative Tehsil: 06: Baba Kot Tehsil Chattar Subdivision Dera Murad Jamali Subdivision Landhi Tehsil Mir Hassan Khosa Tehsil Tamboo Tehsil

Government
  - Type: District Administration
  - Deputy Commissioner: Varender Lal
  - Constituensy: NA-254 Nasirabad-cum-Kachhi-cum-Jhal Magsi
  - National Assembly Member: Khalid Hussain Magsi (BAP)

Area
  - District of Balochistan: 3,387 km^{2} (1,308 sq mi)
- Elevation: 67 m (220 ft)

Population (2023)
  - District of Balochistan: 563,315
  - Density: 166.3/km^{2} (430.8/sq mi)
  - Urban: 106,952 (19.70%)
  - Rural: 456,363 (80.30%)

Literacy
  - Literacy rate: Total: (28.96%); Male: (36.43%); Female: (21.18%)
- Time zone: UTC+05:00 (PKT)
  - Summer (DST): DST is not observed
- ZIP Code: 80700
- NWD (area) code: 0838
- ISO 3166 code: PK-BA
- CNIC Code Nasirabad District: 53402-XXXXXXX-X

Nasirabad or Naseerabad (Urdu: ضلع نصیر آباد) is a district of Nasirabad Division in Balochistan, Pakistan. The District was notified in 1974 by separating from Kalat District. For three years, it was called Tamboo District from July 1987 to December 1990, This district is named after Naseer Ahmad who served there Deputy Commissioner in mid 80's and later became Commissioner of the Naseerabad Division in eraly 90's.The district's headquarters are located at Dera Murad Jamali. According to 2023 Pakistani census population of Nasirabad District is 565,315.

== History ==
The division is named after the Khan of Kalat, Mir Nasir Khan I, who was one of the most respected rulers of Kalat; he ruled Kalat from (1747-1794), and founded the Brahvi-Baloch Confederation, with its center in Khanate of Kalat.

Nasirabad District was first part of state of Kalat until the formation of Kalat District on February 3, 1954. Nasirabad was then separated from Kalat district in 1974, while in 1987 the new district of Jafarabad was cleaved out of it. For three years, from July 1987 to December 1990, it was known as Tahseel Tamboo. It is named after Naseer Ahmad who served there as a Deputy Commissioner of the District Tamboo. Tamboo is a small village 40 km west of Dera Murad Jamali.

== Administrative divisions ==
=== Tehsils ===
The district is administratively subdivided into four Tehsils, these are:

Tehsil	Area (km²)	Pop. (2023)	Density (ppl/km²) (2023)	Literacy rate (2023)	Union Councils
Baba Kot Tehsil	967	53,661	55.49	15.41%	...
Dera Murad Jamali	281	265,822	945.99	34.93%	...
Landhi Tehsil	266	8,638	32.47	17.60%	...
Chattar Tehsil	961	32,276	33.59	17.21%	...
Meer Hassan Tesil	229	53,400	233.19	22.99%	...
Tamboo Tehsil	683	149,518	218.91	28.80%	...

=== Union councils ===
These tehsils are further divided into union councils. Currently, there are 31 union councils and one municipal committee in the district:

Tehsil Dera Murad Jamali

- Municipal Committee Dera Murad Jamali
- Union Council Quba Sher Khan Sharqi
- Union Council Quba Sher Khan Gharbi
- Union Council Naseer Khan Umrani
- Union Council Jhuder Shimali
- Union Council Bedar Androon Sharqi
- Union Council Bedar Gharbi
- Union Council Manjhoti Sharqi
- Union Council Sardar Shahzada Khan Umrani
- Union Council Sikandarabad
- Union Council Manjhoti Gharbi
- Union Council Jhuder Janubi

Tehsil Chhatter

- Union Council Chhatter
- Union Council Phuleji
- Union Council Shah Pur
- Union Council Daulat Ghari Mir Nabi Bakhsh Khan
- Union Council Daulat Ghari Mir Hassan Khosa
- Union Council Shori Drabi

Tehsil Tamboo

- Union Council Manjhoo Shoori
- Union Council Aeri
- Union Council Gola Wah
- Union Council Ali Abad Shumali
- Union Council Mir Behram Khan Buledi
- Union Council Qadir Abad
- Union Council Kharoos Wah
- Union Council Fateh Mohammad
- Union Council Mir Wah
- Union Council Abdullah Bari
- Union Council Ali Abad

Tehsil Baba Kot

- Union Council Garhi Rehman
- Union Council Baba Kot
- Union Council Kuhna Tamboo

== Demographics ==
Historical population
Year	Pop.	±% p.a.
1951	...	—
1961	21,458	—
1972	43,893	+6.72%
1981	129,112	+12.74%
1998	245,894	+3.86%
2017	487,847	+3.67%
2023	563,315	+2.43%

=== Population ===
As of the 2023 census, Nasirabad district has 87,516 households and a population of 563,315. The district has a sex ratio of 104.54 males to 100 females and a literacy rate of 28.96%: 36.43% for males and 21.18% for females. 216,847 (38.49% of the surveyed population) are under 10 years of age. 106,952 (18.99%) live in urban areas.

=== Religion ===
Religions in Nasirabad district (2023)
Religion	Percent
Islam	99.21%
Hinduism	0.5%
Other	0.29%

Religions in present-day Nasirabad district
Religion	2017		2023	
Religion	Pop.	%	Pop.	%
Islam	484,229	99.26%	560,020	99.21%
Hinduism	3,213	0.66%	2,800	0.5%
Others	405	0.08%	1,629	0.29%
Total Population	487,847	100%	563,315	100%

Islam is the largest religion. Hinduism is a minority religion while Christianity has around 1,400 followers in the district.

=== Language ===
Languages of Nasirabad district (2023)
1. Balochi (43.2%)
2. Brahui (22.8%)
3. Sindhi (21.2%)
4. Saraiki (12.2%)
5. Others (0.59%)

At the time of the 2023 census, 43.21% of the population spoke Balochi, 22.27% Brahui, 21.16% Sindhi and 12.15% Saraiki as their first language.

== Bibliography ==
- 1998 District census report of Nasirabad. Census publication. Vol. 26. Islamabad: Population Census Organization, Statistics Division, Government of Pakistan. 1999.
