= Jamali tribe =

South Asian demographic group

Jamali People
Regions with significant populations
- Balochistan, Sindh

Languages
- Balochi, Sindhi

Religion
- Islam

The Jamali (Balochi: جمالي) is a Baloch tribe which some historians say is a sub-caste of the Rind Baloch and some say it is one of 43 tribes who come under leadership of Mir Jalal Khan. Mainly settled in the Balochistan and Sindh provinces of Pakistan, the Jamalis reside in Jaffarabad in Balochistan and in Nawabshah,Matiari and Dadu districts of Sindh.

The principal sections of Jamali are Muridani, Taharani (also known as Sher Khanani), Sobdrani, Shahaliani, Shahalzai, Mundrani, Sahriani (originally Khosa), Doshli, Zanwrani (also Khosa), Waswani, Bhandani, Issani , Babar, TIngiani, Manjhi, Ramdani and Rehanwala.
