= Jafarabad District =

District in Balochistan, Pakistan

Coordinates: 28°25′N 68°10′E

Jafarabad District ضلع جعفر آباد
- District of Balochistan
- Map of Balochistan with Jafarabad District highlighted in red
- Country: Pakistan
- Province: Balochistan
- Division: Nasirabad
- Established: 1987
- Headquarters: Dera Allah Yar

Government
  - Type: District Administration
  - Deputy Commissioner: Azhar Shahzad
  - Assistant Commissioner: Arsalan Chaudhry

Area
  - District of Balochistan: 690 km^{2} (270 sq mi)

Population (2023)
  - District of Balochistan: 594,558
  - Density: 361.9/km^{2} (937/sq mi)
  - Urban: 163,393
  - Rural: 431,165

Literacy
  - Literacy rate: Total: (35.53%); Male: (44.43%); Female: (26.37%)
- Time zone: UTC+5 (PST)
- Constituency: NA 255
- Website: Official site

Jafarabad District (Note: Balochi: جعفر آباد, Urdu: ضلع جعفر آباد) is a district that lies in the southeastern part of Pakistan's province of Balochistan. Dera Allah Yar, also known as Jhatpat among locals, serves as the district headquarters. Jafarabad District is sub-divided into two tehsils. According to 2023 Pakistani census Jafarabad district has a population of 594,558.

== History ==
Jafarabad District was created in 1987 by bifurcation of Nasirabad District. Sohbatpur, Usta Muhammad & Gandakha ended up being part of Jafarabad district. Jafarabad district is named after Mir Jafar Khan Jamali.

In 2022 Usta Muhammad was split off to form the new district of Usta Muhammad.

== Geography ==
Jafarabad District, located in the eastern part of Balochistan, shares its borders with several districts both within Balochistan and the neighboring province of Sindh. To the west, it is bordered by Nasirabad District, while to the north lies Sohbatpur District. The northwestern boundary connects with Dera Bugti District, adding to its strategic location within Balochistan. On its eastern and southeastern sides, Jafarabad shares provincial boundaries with Sindh, specifically with Jacobabad District to the east and Kashmore District to the southeast.

== Demographics ==
=== Population ===
Historical population
Year	Pop.	±% p.a.
1951	N/A	—
1961	N/A	—
1972	N/A	—
1981	N/A	—
1998	291,290	—
2017	513,972	+3.03%
2023	302,498	−8.46%

As of the 2023 census, Jafarabad district has a population of 302,498. (Note: The Usta Mohammad and Gandakha tehsils were carved out of this districtto form Usta Mohammad district. So removed those tehsils from the data) The district has a sex ratio of 102.79 males to 100 females and a literacy rate of 35.53%: 44.43% for males and 26.37% for females. 224,911 (37.83% of the surveyed population) are under 10 years of age. 163,393 (27.48%) live in urban areas.

=== Religion ===
Religions in Jaffarabad district (2023)
Religion	Percent
Islam	98.46%
Hinduism	1.12%
Other	0.42%

Religions in present-day Jafarabad district
Religion	2017		2023 (Note: The Usta Mohammad and Gandakha tehsils were carved out of Jaffarabad district to form Usta Mohammad district. So removed those tehsils from the data)	
Religion	Pop.	%	Pop.	%
Islam	503,905	98.03%	297,851	98.46%
Hinduism	8,896	1.84%	3,381	1.12%
Others	695	0.13%	1,266	0.42%
Total Population	513,972	100%	302,498	100%

Islam is the predominant religion of the district with 97.33% followers.

=== Language ===
Languages of Jafarabad district (2023)
1. Balochi (51.9%)
2. Sindhi (19.3%)
3. Saraiki (15.4%)
4. Brahui (12.1%)
5. Others (1.25%)

At the time of the 2023 census, 51.9% of the population spoke Balochi, 19.33% Sindhi, 15.45% Saraiki, and 12.07% Brahui as their first language.

== Administration ==
The district of Jafarabad is administratively subdivided into the following two Tehsils:

Tehsil	Area (km²)	Pop. (2023)	Density (ppl/km²) (2023)	Literacy rate (2023)	Union Councils
Jafarabad Tehsil	...	...	...	...	...
Jhatpat Tehsil	690	302,498	438.40	36.70%	...

== Education ==
According to the Pakistan District Education Rankings 2017, district Jafarabad is ranked at number 113 out of the 141 ranked districts in Pakistan on the Education Score index. This index considers learning, gender parity and retention in the district.

Literacy rate in 2014–15 of population 10 years and older in the district stood at 36% whereas for females it was only 15%.

Post-primary access is a major issue in the district, with 89% of schools being at the primary level. Compared with high schools, which only constitute 4% of government schools in the district. This is also reflected in the enrolment figures, with 27,448 students enrolled in classes 1 to 5 and only 736 students enrolled in class 9 and 10.

Gender disparity is another issue in the district. Only 28% schools in the district are girls’ schools. Access to education for girls is a major issue in the district and is also reflected in the low literacy rates for females.

Moreover, the schools in the district lack basic facilities. According to Alif AAilaan Pakistan District Education Rankings 2017, the district is ranked at number 117 out of the 155 districts of Pakistan for primary school infrastructure. At the middle school level, it is ranked number 116 out of the 155 districts. These rankings take into account the basic facilities available in schools, including drinking water, a working toilet, the availability of electricity, the existence of a boundary wall, and general building conditions. More than 3 out of 5 schools in the district lack electricity, a working toilet, and a boundary wall. More than 1 out of 5 schools do not have clean drinking water.

The main issues reported in Taleem Do! App for the district are the unavailability of class rooms for students and a lack of university. Political interference is also reported in the development of new schools.

== See also ==
- Tehsils of Pakistan
  - Tehsils of Balochistan, Pakistan
- Districts of Pakistan
  - Districts of Balochistan, Pakistan
- Divisions of Pakistan
  - Divisions of Balochistan, Pakistan
