= Mir (given name) =

Mir is a given name. In the majority of cases it is the name originated in the Indian subcontinent. It can also be a part of a two-part given name, such as Mir-Hasan or Mir-Fatah. A number of historical persons are commonly referred by the name starting with honorific "Mir". Notable people with the name starting with "Mir" include:

- Mir of Tidore (c. 1511-1550s), third sultan of Tidore, Maluku Islands

== A ==
- Mir Aamir Ali Khan Magsi
- Mir Abdul (given name), multiple persons
- Mir Abul Khayer
- Mir Afsar Ali, Indian radio jockey and television anchor
- Mir Ahmad (given name), multiple persons
- Mir Aimal Kansi
- Mir Akbar Khyber
- Mir Akbar Mengal
- Mir Ali (disambiguation), multiple persons
- Mir Amanullah Notezai
- Mir Amir Rind
- Mir Amman (1748–1806), employee of Fort William College at Calcutta and translator
- Mir Anees
- Mir Aneesuddin
- Mir Asadullah Baloch
- Mir Asghar Rind
- Mir Azam (born 1978), Pakistani first-class cricketer

== B ==
- Mir Bacha Khan
- Mir Bandeh Ali Khan Talpur
- Mir Bashir (palmist)
- Mir Bashir Gasimov
- Mir Basri
- Mir Bijar Khan Talpur

== C ==
- Mir Chakar Rind
- Mir Changez Khan Jamali

== D ==
- Mir Damad
- Mir Dariya Khan Khoso
- Mir Dast
- Mir Dostain Khan Domki

== E ==
- Mir Ebrahim Seyyed Hatami
- Mir Ershad Ali

== F ==
- Mir Faiz Muhammad Khan Talpur II
- Mir Fendereski

== G ==
- Mir Geribert (died 1060), Catalan nobleman and a rebel against the Count of Barcelona as the self-declared "Prince of Olèrdola"
- Mir Ghalib Hussain Domki
- Mir Ghazanfar Ali Khan
- Mir Ghesmat Mosavi Asl
- Mir Ghulam Ali
- Mir Ghulam Ali Talpur
- Mir Ghulam Ali Talpur Sr.
- Mir Gwahram Khan Lashari

== H ==
- Mir Habib
- Mir Haibat Khan Tanoli
- Mir Haji Muhammad Hayat Khan Talpur
- Mir Hamal Kalmati
- Mir Hamza
- Mir Hasan (disambiguation), multiple persons
- Mir Hasem Ali
- Mir Hasmat Ali
- Mir Hazar Khan Khoso, Pakistani politician
- Mir Hidayat bey Seyidov
- Mir Humayun Aziz Kurd
- Mir Humayun Jah Bahadur
- Mir Humayun Khan Marri
- Mir Hussein bin Haydar

== I ==
- Mir Ibrahim Rahman
- Mir Imam Bakhsh Khan Talpur
- Mir Imran
- Mir Izhar Hussain Khosa

== J ==
- Mir Jafar (disambiguation), multiple persons
- Mir Jahanzaib Mengal
- Mir Jalal Pashayev
- Mir Jalaleddin Kazzazi
- Mir Janullah Shah
- Mir Jehandad Khan
- Mir Jumla, multiple persons

== K ==
- Mir Kabeer Ahmed Muhammad Shahi
- Mir Kalam, Pakistani politician and leader of the Pashtun Tahafuz Movement
- Mir Khalid Humayun Langau
- Mir Khalifa
- Mir Khalil-ur-Rehman
- Mir Khan Muhammad Jamali
- Mir Khasim Ali
- Mir Kohyar Khan Domki

== L ==
- Mir Laiq Ali
- Mir Laiq Ali Khan, Salar Jung II
- Mir Liaquat Ali Lehri

== M ==
- Mir Madan
- Mir Majedur Rahman
- Mir Masjidi Khan
- Mir Masoom Ali
- Mir Mast Afridi, Pashtun defector to the Ottoman Empire from allied trenches during World War I
- Mir Maswood Ali
- Mir Mehboob Ali Khan Bijarani
- Mir Mehdi Etimad
- Mir Mehdi Khazani
- Mir Mirak Andrabi
- Mir Mohammad (given name), multiple persons
- Mir Mohsun Navvab
- Mir Mohtesham Ali Khan
- Mir Mosharraf Hossain
- Mir Mostaque Ahmed Robi
- Mir Movsum Agha
- Mir Mu'min Astarabadi
- Mir Mugdho
- Mir Mujeeb-ur-Rehman Muhammad Hasani
- Mir Mukhtar Akhyar
- Mir Munawar Ali Talpur
- Mir Musavvir
- Mir Mustafa

== N ==
- Mir Nadir Ali Khan Magsi
- Mir Naimatullah Zehri
- Mir Najaf Ali Khan
- Mir Najm Zargar Gilani
- Mir Naseebullah Khan
- Mir Nawab Khan Tanoli
- Mir Nawaz
- Mir Nawaz Khan Marwat
- Mir Nooruddin Mengal

== O ==
- Mir Osman Ali Khan

== P ==
- Mir Painda Khan

== Q ==
- Mir Quasem Ali
- Mir Quasem Mondal

== R ==
- Mir Rahman Rahmani
- Mir Ranjan Negi, Indian hockey player
- Mir Rasool Bux Talpur
- Mir Rud Posht

== S ==
- Mir Sabbir, Bangladeshi actor and film director
- Mir Sadat
- Mir Sadiq
- Mir Saeed Ahmed Langove
- Mir Saleem Ahmed Khoso
- Mir Sarfraz Chakar Domki
- Mir Sarwar
- Mir Sayyid Ali
- Mir Sayyid Ali Hamadani
- Mir Seyyed Abd al-Latif Shushtari
- Mir Shabbir Bijarani
- Mir Shahadatur Rahman
- Mir Shahdad Khan Talpur
- Mir Shakawat Ali Daru
- Mir Shakil-ur-Rahman
- Mir Shams-ud-Din Araqi
- Mir Shaukat Ali Khan
- Mir Shawkat Ali
- Mir Shoaib Nosherwani
- Mir Showkat Ali Badsha
- Mir Sikandar Ali
- Mir Sohrab Khan Talpur
- Mir Suhail Qadri
- Mir Syed Hussain Simnani

== T ==
- Mir Taher Ali Khan
- Mir Tanha Yousafi
- Mir Taqi Mir (1723–1810), Urdu poet
- Mir Tariq Ali Khan Talpur
- Mir Teymur Yagubov
- Mir Thebo
- Mir Turab Ali Khan, Salar Jung I

== U ==
- Mir Ubaidullah Gorgage

== X ==
- Mir Xanzad

== Y ==
- Mir Yar Beg
- Mir Yar Beg Sahibzada
- Mir Yazdanbakhsh
- Mir Younus Aziz Zehri
- Mir Yousuf Ali Khan, Salar Jung III
- Mir Yusif Mirbabayev

== Z ==
- Mir Zabid Ali Reki
- Mir Zafar Ali
- Mir Zafarullah Khan Zehri
- Mir Zahid Harawi
- Mir Zaman Khan, Afghan War Hero of the 1919 Anglo-Afghan War
- Mir Ziaullah Langau
- Mir Zulfeqar Ali

== See also ==
- Mir (tribe), a tribal name
- Mir (title), a singular beginning on name for person
- Mir (surname), a singular ending on name for person
- Mirpur, a land name related to Mir peoples
- Mirpuri, a conjugation or plural name related to Mirpur lands
- Mirza (name), a singular multi-ethnic on name for half Mir person
- Meer (disambiguation)
- Mir (disambiguation)
