= Mir (title) =

Persian title

Mir (Persian: مير, Kurdish: میر, romanized: Mîr) is a title of Persian origin with variable connotations. It is derived from the Arabic title Emir meaning 'elite, general, prince'.

== Sayyids ==
Mir is the Persian version of the title of tribal leaders of Sayyids, that are addressed in the Arab world as Naqib. Examples of Persian Miran (plural of Mir) are Mir Sayyid Ali Hamadani and the family of the Mir Sayyid Hasan bin Azimullah and Hazrat Ishaan, that are today known as Dakik family.

== Yazidis ==
In Yazidi culture, the Mîr (Kurdish: میر, romanized: Mîr) is the religious and also the administrative authority from the Qatanî branch of the Sheikh caste. The Mîr is the hereditary head of the Sheikhan principality. The former Mîr was Tahseen Said Beg, whose son Hazim Tahsin Beg succeeded him in 2019.

== British India ==
The title Mir is also used by various vassals of the British Indian Empire:

=== Examples ===
In Muslim princely states of British India, a few rulers were formally styled Mir, few reached the level of a salute state, becoming entitled to a gun salute and the attached form of address His Highness:

- the Mir of Khairpur (17 guns), a Rajputana princely state under a branch of the Talpur clan
- the Mir of Hunza (15 guns)

The following all remained non-salute states:

- The Mir of Mirpur State, under a branch of the above Talpur clan
- The Mir of Kharan; from 1921, restyled Sardar Bahadur Nawab, till 1940 a vassal of the Khan and Wali of Kalat (the senior ruler in British Baluchistan)
- Petty Pashtun states around the North-West Frontier:
  - The Mir of Amb, capital Darband; from 1868, restyled Nawab; from 1921 promoted Nawab Bahadur
  - The Mir of Nagar
- the Mirs of Morni, Garhi Kotaha and Pindrawal in the Punjab Province and United Provinces British India (see Muhammad Baquar Ali Khan)

Mir was also used as an honor rank, see Mirza.

=== Compound titles ===
In Indian subcontinent, since the Mughal period, various compounds were used in Persian including:

- Sahibzada Mir: in Indian princely states
- Mīr-tuzak or tǒzak: Marshal, in the sense of an officer who maintains order in a march or procession; master of the ceremonies
- Mīr-dah or Mīr-daha: Commander or superintendent of ten: decurion; a tithingman
- Mīr-sāmān: Head steward
- Mīr-shikār: Master of the hunt, chief huntsman; also Grand Falconer; hence bird-catcher, and (metaphorically) a pimp
- Mīr-ě-ātash or Mīr-ātish: Chief of the fireworks; also commandant of artillery, master of the ordnance
- Mīr-ě-majlis, shortened Mīr-majlis: Master of the ceremonies or president, chairman of a majlis (assembly)
- Mīr-mahalla: Headman of a mahal(la), i.e. quarter (of a town)
- Mīr-ě-manzil, shortened Mīr-manzil: Overseer of the halting-places; quartermaster-general
- Mīr-munshī, from the Arabic Amir-i-Munshi, 'commander of the secretaries': Chief secretary; head (native) clerk of a (colonial) office; also the Chief Secretary of the Foreign Office in the Kingdom of Nepal
- Mir-umrao, from the Arabic Amir al-umara, 'commander of commanders': a senior military officer in the Kingdom of Nepal, ranking below a sardar and charged with the command of a fort and surrounding territories, the training and equipment of soldiers and the supply of material
- Mir-i-miran: used as the Persian equivalent to the Turkish title Beylerbey ("Bey of Beys"), alongside the Arabic equivalent Amir al-umara ("Emir of Emirs") in the Ottoman Empire.

== See also ==
- Mir (tribe), a tribal name
- Mir (given name), a combined name for person
- Mir (surname), a singular ending on name for person
- Mirpur, a land name related to Mir peoples
- Mirpuri, a conjugation or plural name related to Mirpur lands
- Mirza (name), a singular multi-ethnic on name for half Mir person
- Meer (disambiguation)
- Mir (disambiguation)
