= Mirpuri =

Mirpuri may refer to:

- something of, from, or related to any of the places known as Mirpur
- more specifically, something of, from or related to the region of Mirpur, Azad Kashmir in Pakistan
  - Mirpuri dialect, a variety of Pahari-Pothwari spoken in the region
  - Mirpuri diaspora
    - British Mirpuris
  - Mahan Singh Mirpuri (d. 1844), general in the kingdom of Maharaja Ranjit Singh
- Mirpuri Group, which runs Hi Fly (airline) in Portugal

== See also ==
- Mir (tribe), a tribal name
- Mir (given name), a combined name for person
- Mir (title), a singular beginning on name for person
- Mir (surname), a singular ending on name for person
- Mirpur, a land name related to Mir peoples
- Mirza (name), a singular multi-ethnic on name for half Mir person
- Meer (disambiguation)
- Mir (disambiguation)
