= Mir Mughal =

Clan of Kashmir, India

Mir Mughal, mostly just spelled as 'Mir' or 'Meer' (Kashmiri: میٖر, Persian: مير), is a Kashmiri Muslim clan found both in the Kashmir Valley of Jammu and Kashmir, India, and among the Kashmiri diaspora.

== Origins ==
The word "Mir" is a shortened form of the Persian word Mirza, meaning a person of princely blood. Mir in this sense is a short form of Mirza which was a honourable title for Mughals. They are descendents of those people who came to Kashmir from Khorasan and Turkestan in the 14th century.

== Difference between Mughals & Sayyids ==
'Mir' was also a common title among the Sayyids of the Kashmir Valley who came to Kashmir from Persia accompanying Mir Sayyid Ali Hamadani in Kashmir during the reign of the Shah Mir dynasty , and the way the two groups distinguish between themselves is that the Sayyids prefix the word 'Mir' to their names (e.g., Mir Mubarak and Mir Maqbool), whereas the non-Sayyids(Mughals) use it as a suffix to their names. (e.g., Aziz Mir, Gaffar Mir etc.)

== See also ==
- Mughal people
- Mir (given name), a combined name for person
- Mir (title), a singular beginning on name for person
- Mir (surname), a singular ending on name for person
- Mirpur, a land name related to Mir peoples
- Mirpuri, a conjugation or plural name related to Mirpur lands
- Mirza (name), a singular multi-ethnic on name for half Mir person
- Meer (disambiguation)
- Mir (disambiguation)
