= Mirpur =

Mirpur may refer to several places:

== In Bangladesh ==
- Mirpur Model Thana, a locality in Dhaka
  - Mirpur DOHS, a neighbourhood of Dhaka
  - Mirpur College, a private college
  - Mirpur Stadium or Sher-e-Bangla National Cricket Stadium
- Mirpur Upazila, in Kushtia District
- Mirpur, Kushtia, capital of Mirpur Upazila

== In India ==
- Mirpur Turk, a town in Delhi
- Meerpur, a village in Madhya Pradesh
- Mirpur Jattan, a village in Punjab
- Mirpur, Sirohi, a village in Rajasthan

== In Pakistan ==
- Mirpur, Azad Kashmir, a city in Azad Kashmir
  - Mirpur Division, an administrative division in Azad Kashmir
  - Mirpur District, a district in Azad Kashmir
  - Mirpur Tehsil, a Tehsil in Azad Kashmir
- Mirpur Khas, a city in Sindh
  - Mirpur Khas Division, an administrative division in Sindh
  - Mirpur Khas District, a district in Sindh
- Mirpur Bathoro, a town in Sindh
- Mirpur Mathelo, a town in Sindh
- Mirpur Sakro, a town in Sindh
- Mirpur, Abbottabad, a Union Council of Abbottabad district

== See also ==
- Siege of Mirpur, during the First Kashmir War in 1947
- Mir (tribe), a tribal name
- Mir (given name), a combined name for person
- Mir (title), a singular beginning on name for person
- Mir (surname), a singular ending on name for person
- Mirpuri, a conjugation or plural name related to Mirpur lands
- Mirza (name), a singular multi-ethnic on name for half Mir person
- Meer (disambiguation)
- Mir (disambiguation)
