= Mir Hasan =

Mir Hasan may refer to:

- Mir Hasan, Kermanshah, a village in Kermanshah province, Iran
- Mir Hasan, Razavi Khorasan, a village in Razavi Khorasan province, Iran
- Mir Hasan (poet), an 18th-century Urdu poet
- Mir Hasan Vazirov (1889–1918), an Azerbaijani socialist revolutionary

== See also ==
- Mir Hasani, a village in southern Iran
