= Twenterand =

Twenterand Tweanteraand (Twents)
- Municipality
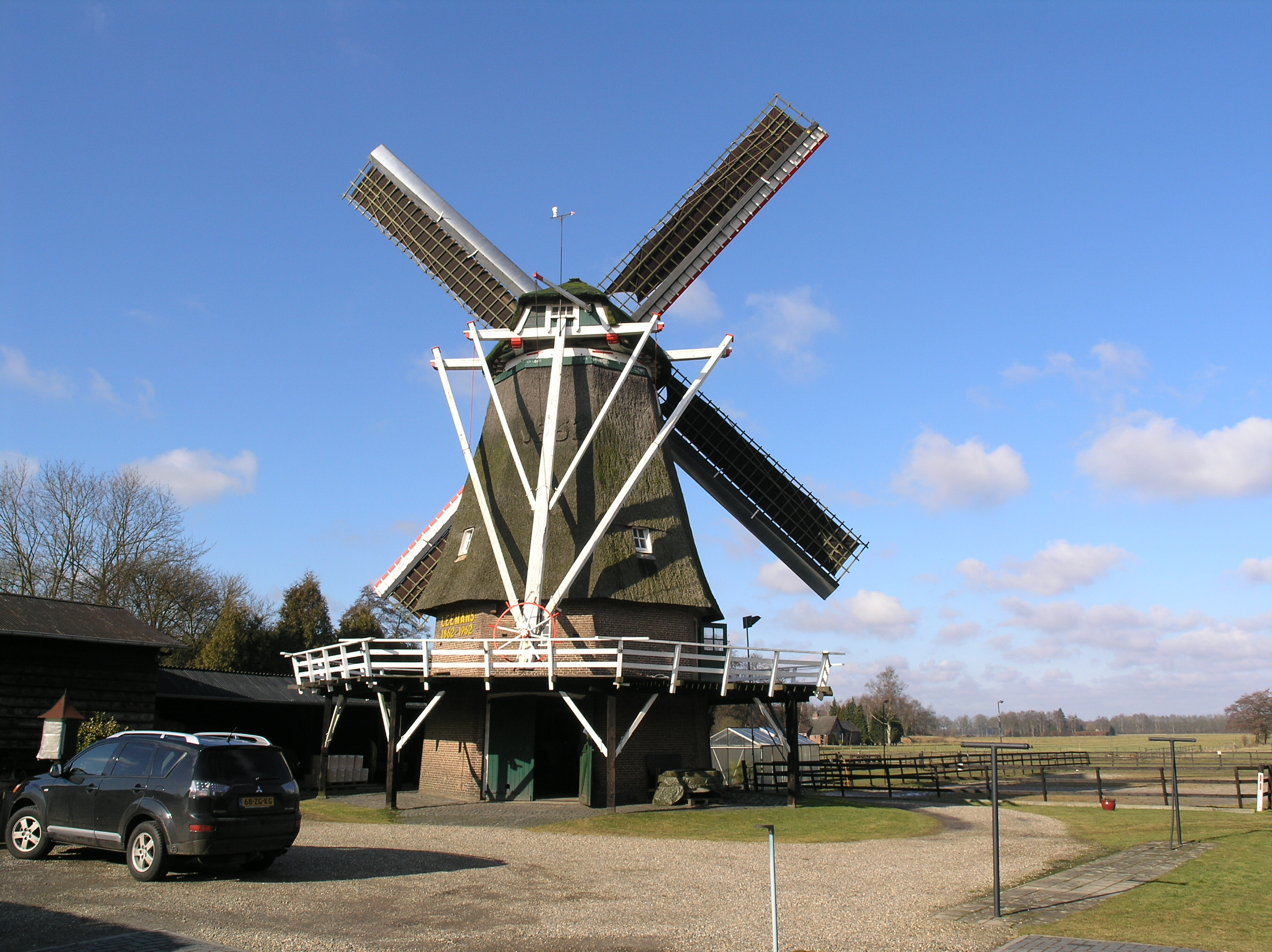
- Windmill in Vriezenveen

- Flag Coat of arms

- Location in Overijssel

- Location within Overijssel Location within Netherlands
- Coordinates: 52°25′N 6°38′E
- Country: Netherlands
- Province: Overijssel
- Established: 1 January 2001
- Renamed: 1 January 2003

Government
  - Body: Municipal council
  - Mayor: Hans Broekhuizen (CDA)

Area
  - Total: 108.14 km^{2} (41.75 sq mi)
  - Land: 106.17 km^{2} (40.99 sq mi)
  - Water: 1.97 km^{2} (0.76 sq mi)
- Elevation: 10 m (33 ft)

Population (January 2021)
  - Total: 33,699
  - Density: 317/km^{2} (820/sq mi)
- Time zone: UTC+1 (CET)
  - Summer (DST): UTC+2 (CEST)
- Postcode: 7670–7677, 7680–7683
- Area code: 0546
- Website: www.twenterand.nl

Twenterand (Dutch: [ˈtʋɛntərɑnt]; Twents: Tweanteraand) is a municipality in the province of Overijssel in the eastern Netherlands. The name means "edge of Twente" as it is situated on the northwestern fringe of the historical region of Twente.

The municipality of Twenterand also had two city halls, because of the merger between the former municipalities of Vriezenveen and Den Ham in 2001. The city hall in Vriezenveen remained. The extended municipality of Vriezenveen is called Twenterand since 2003. The former municipal area of Vriezenveen belongs to the region of Twente and the former municipal area of Den Ham partly to the region of Salland and partly to the region of Twente.

== Population centres ==
- Bruinehaar
- De Pollen
- Den Ham
- Geerdijk
- Kloosterhaar
- Meer
- Vriezenveen
- Vroomshoop
- Weitemanslanden
- Westerhaar-Vriezenveensewijk
- Westerhoeven

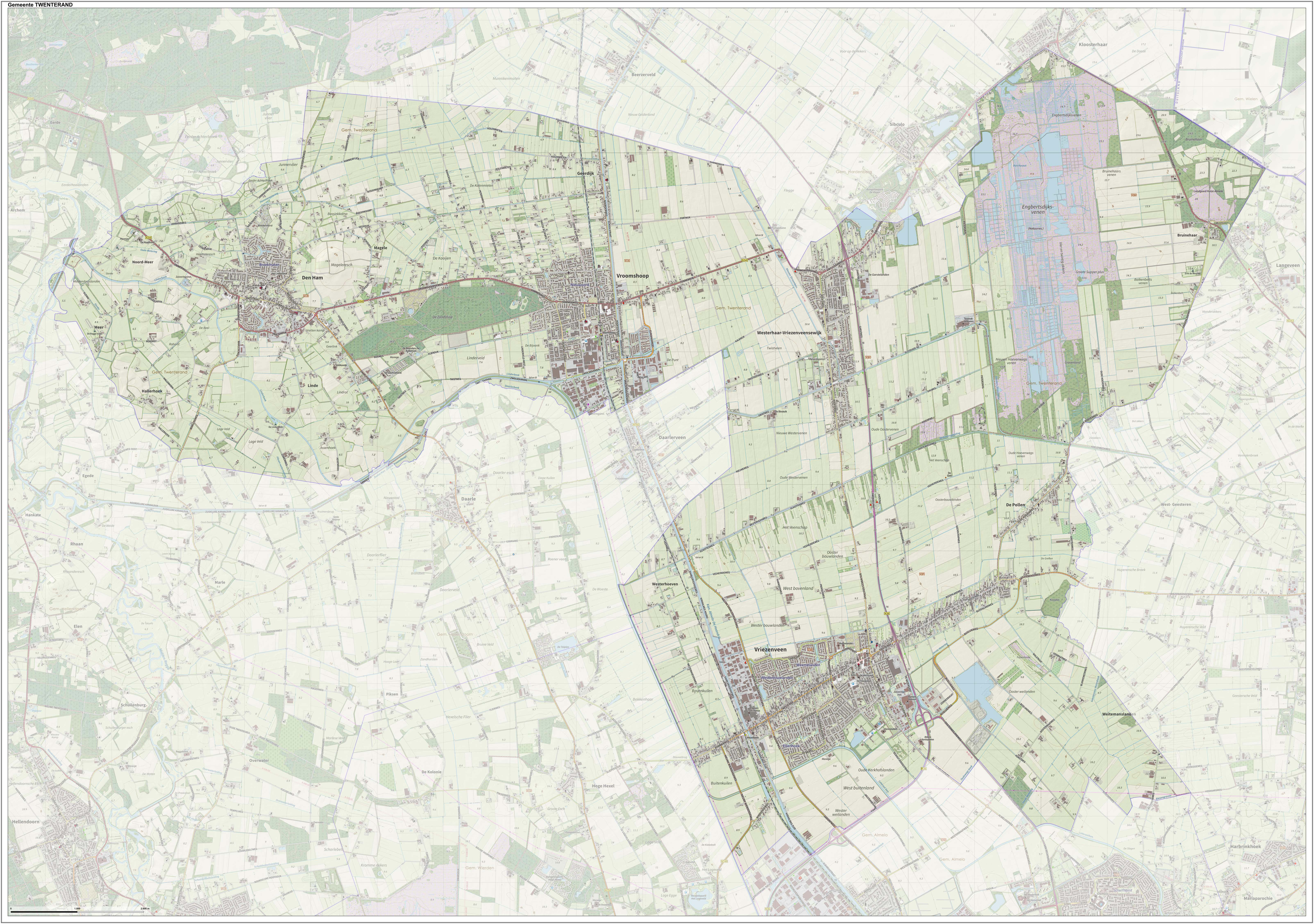

Dutch topographic map of the municipality of Twenterand, June 2015

== Transportation ==
- Geerdijk railway station
- Vriezenveen railway station
- Vroomshoop railway station

== Notable people ==
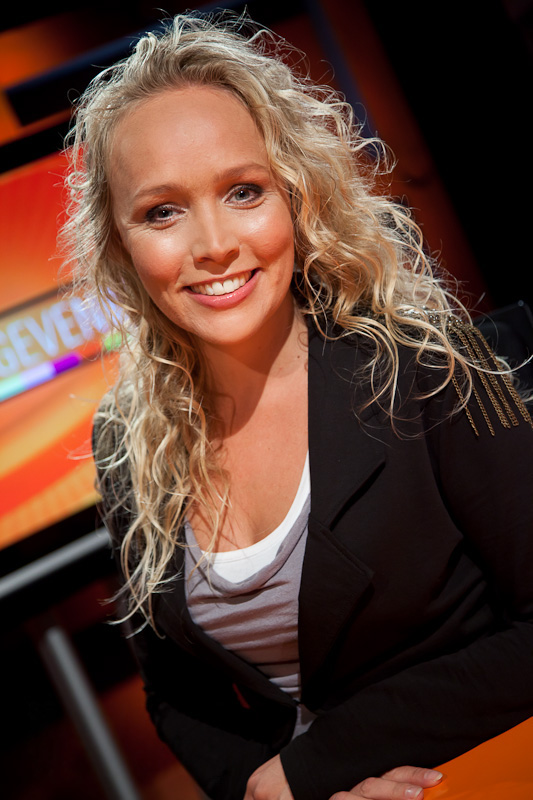
Sabine Uitslag, 2011

- Louis Reijtenbagh (born 1946 in Den Ham) a Dutch businessman, investor, a retired general practitioner and art collector
- Sabine Uitslag (born 1973 in Westerhaar-Vriezenveensewijk) a former Dutch politician
- Manon Fokke (born 1976 in Vriezenveen) a Dutch politician
- Sanne Nijhof (born 1987 in Den Ham) a Dutch model

=== Sport ===
- Berend Veneberg (born 1963 in Den Ham) a former strongman and powerlifter
- Jarno Hams (born 1974 in Hengelo) a strongman
- Johan Kenkhuis (born 1980 in Vriezenveen) swimmer, won bronze at the 2000 Summer Olympics
- Christian Kist (born 1986 in Mariënberg) a Dutch professional darts player
- Maayke Heuver (born 1990 in Vriezenveen) a former Dutch footballer, 154 caps for FC Twente and 17 for NL women's team

== Gallery ==
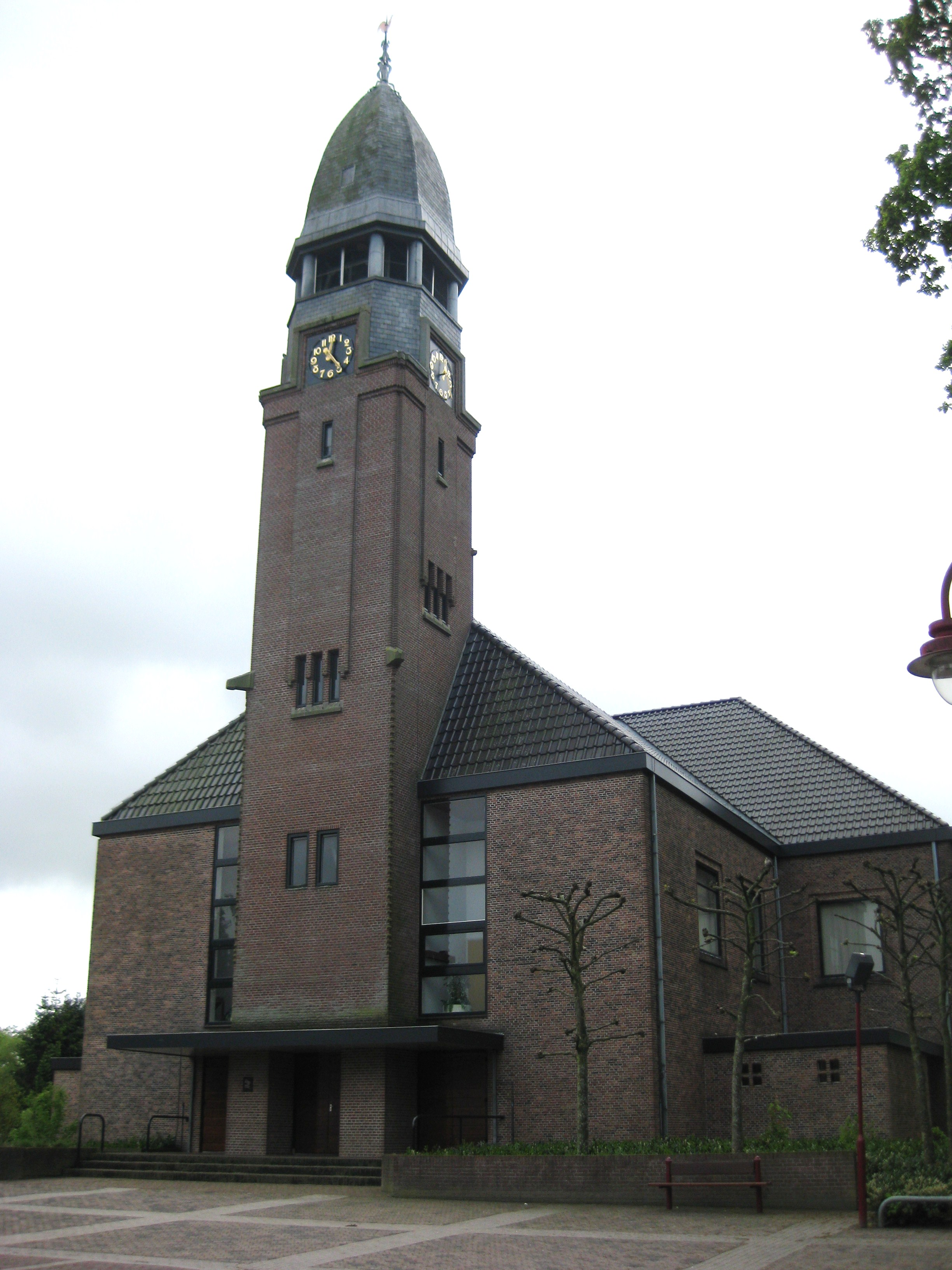
Ned. Hervormde Kerk Vriezenveen

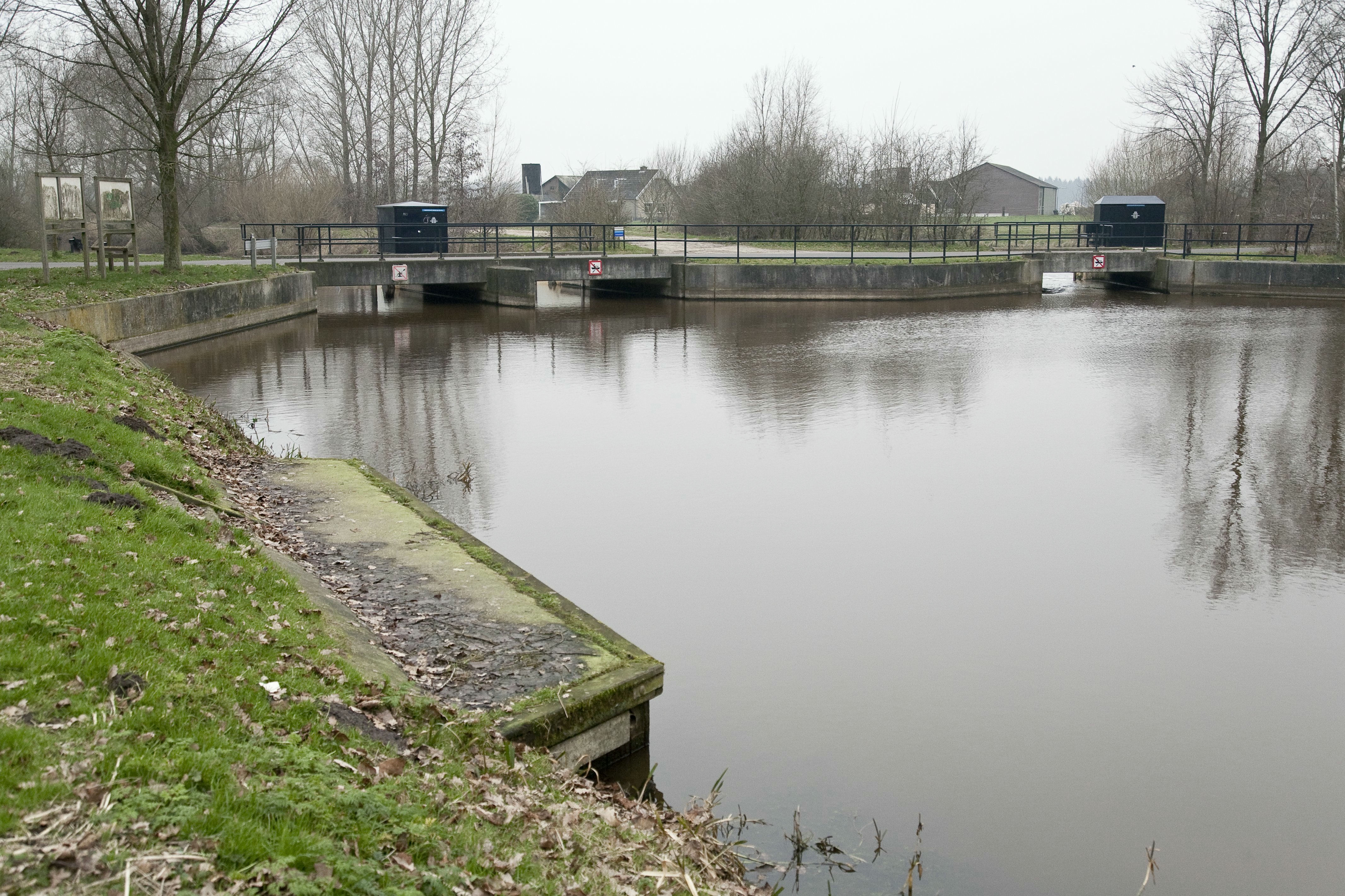
De Veene-leiding loopt hier over in de Linderbeek - Vroomshoop

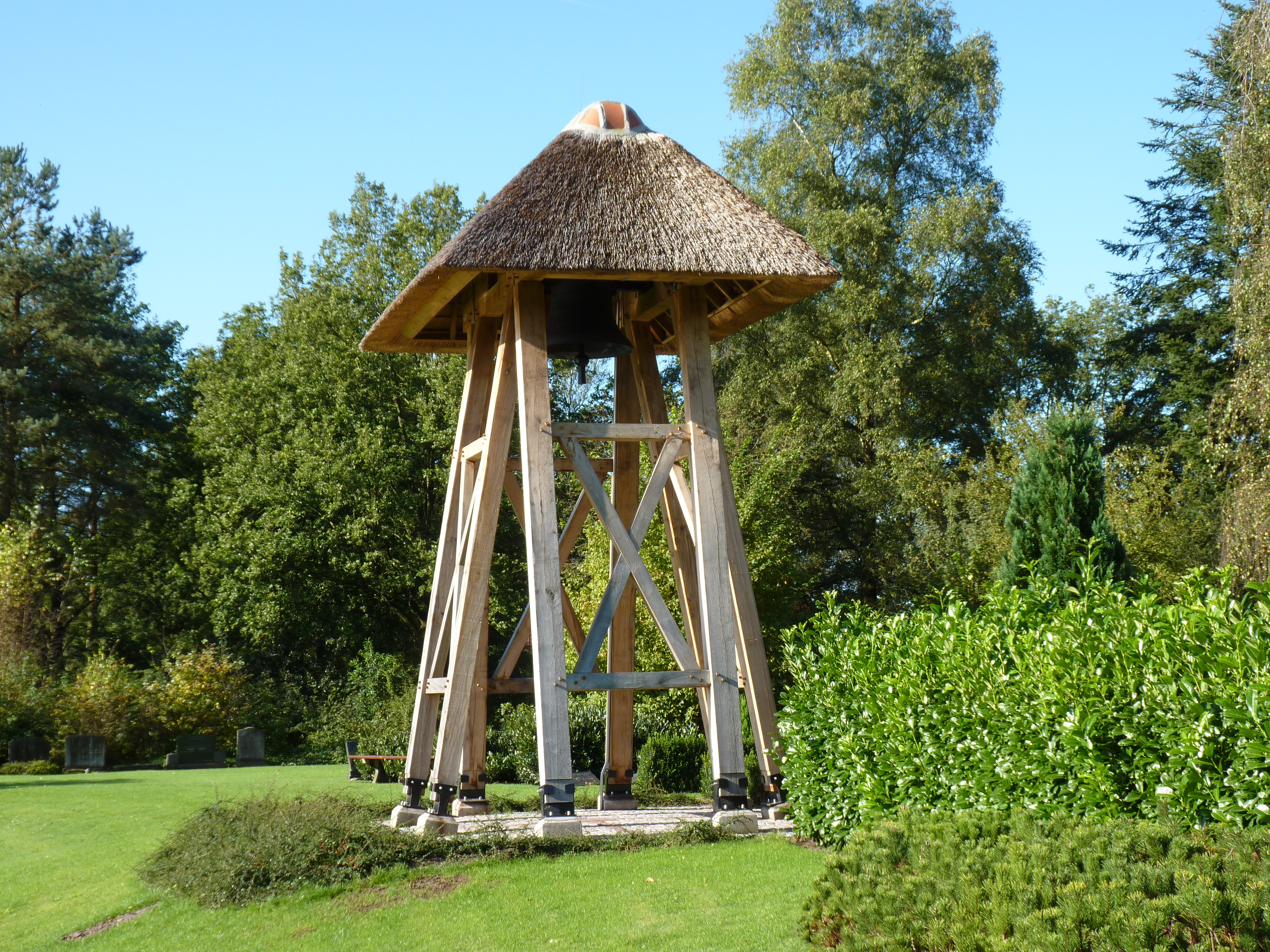
Den Ham, klokkenstoel

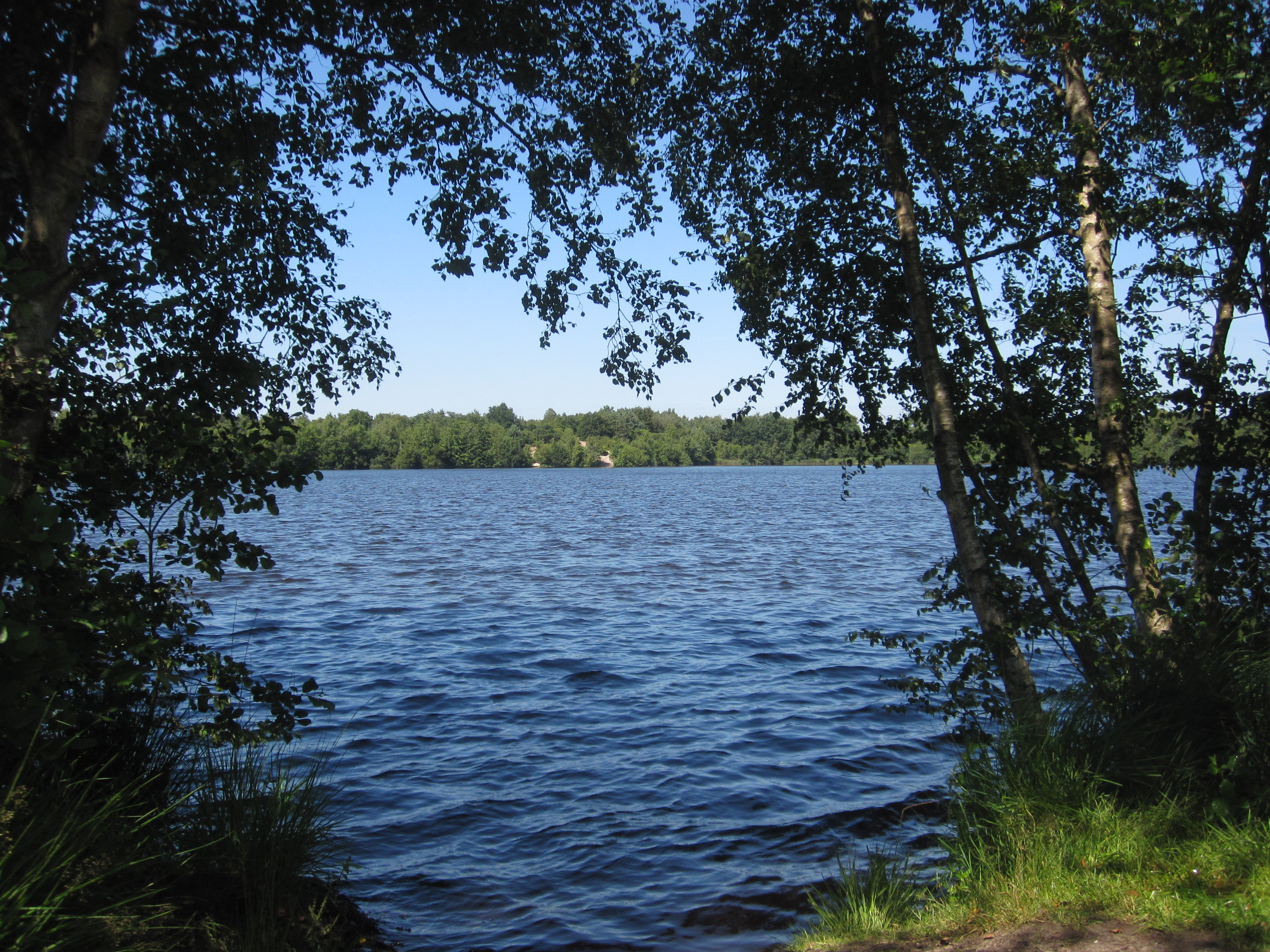
Vriezenveen
