= Mirpur Khas (disambiguation) =

Mirpur Khas is a city in Sindh, Pakistan.

Mirpur Khas may also refer to:

- Mirpur Khas Division, an administrative unit of Sindh, Pakistan
- Mirpur Khas District, a district of Sindh, Pakistan
- Mirpur Khas railway station, a railway station in Pakistan

== See also ==
- Mirpur (disambiguation)
