= MiR =

MiR may refer to:

- MiR, Musiktheater im Revier, a theater in Gelsenkirchen, Germany
- miR, microRNA, a small non-coding RNA molecule
- MiR (satellite), a satellite launched in 2012 by Rokot

== See also ==
- mir (disambiguation)
