= Stud finder =

Device used to locate framing studs in buildings

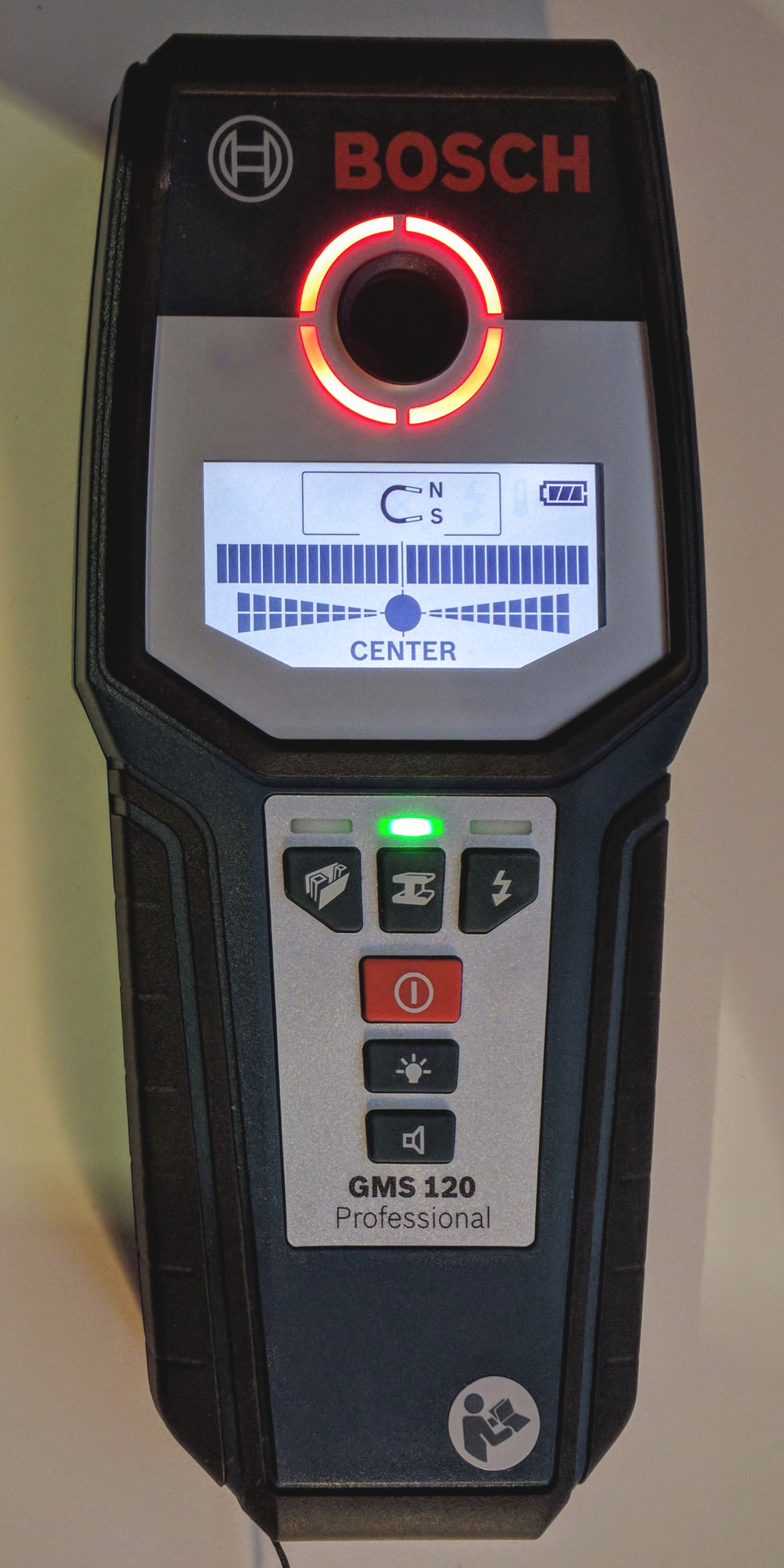
Multifunction stud finder

A stud finder (also stud detector or stud sensor) is a handheld device used to locate wood or metal framing studs behind walls. In the United States, walls are typically made of drywall (also called sheetrock), though stud finders can also be used on lath and plaster walls, and in some cases, even tile.

Stud finders generally fall into two main categories: magnetic and electronic. Magnetic stud finders detect the metal fasteners (such as nails or screws) used to secure wallboard to studs, while electronic models use sensors to detect changes in wall density. Some advanced models incorporate additional capacative sensors, radar, or imaging technology for more precise detection.

== History ==
Stud finders have been in use since the early 20th century. The earliest models were magnetic, using internal magnets to detect metal fasteners—such as nails or screws—embedded in wall surfaces and presumed to mark the location of studs.

In 1977, Robert Franklin developed an electronic stud finder that used a capacitor to detect changes in wall density. His design was manufactured by the Zircon Corporation, which held the patent and remained the sole producer of electronic stud finders until the patent expired in 1998. While innovative, early electronic models were sometimes inconsistent in accurately locating studs.

In 1995, Thomas McEwan patented an ultra-wideband radar system for sensing applications. This system, based on micropower impulse radar technology, enabled the development of more advanced scanning tools, including some types of stud finders.

Following the expiration of Franklin’s patent, further advancements were made to electronic stud finders based on capacitive sensing. In 2011, David Dorrough developed the use of additional capacitive sensors in electronic stud finders and patented them under Franklin Sensors. Previously, electronic stud finders had used only one or two sensors. The addition of more sensors eliminated the need to calibrate electronic stud finders and increased their accuracy.

== Magnetic stud finders ==
Movement of magnet inside magnetic stud finder

Magnetic stud detectors use magnets to locate metal fasteners—such as nails or screws—that are embedded in wall studs. As the magnet moves across the wall surface, it is drawn toward these fasteners; the pull becomes stronger as the magnet approaches the metal. The point of strongest magnetic attraction typically corresponds to the location of a fastener, which may indicate the presence of a stud behind the wall.

To locate a stud, users move the magnet across the wall until they detect a noticeable pull. Magnetic stud finders operate on the assumption that fasteners are driven into the center of studs, although this is not always accurate. Therefore, users often confirm stud spacing by locating multiple fasteners. In many modern buildings, studs are spaced 16 inches apart, measured from center to center.

Magnetic stud finders can be particularly useful in older homes with lath and plaster walls that contain metal mesh, which may interfere with the accuracy of electronic stud finders.

== Electronic stud finders ==
Electronic stud finders use sensors to detect changes in the dielectric constant of a wall. The dielectric constant varies depending on the density and composition of the material behind the wall surface; when the sensor passes over a stud, the reading typically changes, indicating a higher-density area. Some models also include additional features that can detect metal objects or live AC voltage.

Electronic stud finders currently come in three types: edge finders, center finders, and multi-sensor finders.

- Edge finders detect the edges of a stud by identifying where the dielectric constant changes. Users must mark both edges manually to determine the center.
- Center finders use more advanced sensors to automatically identify the center of a stud without requiring manual edge marking.

=== Edge finders ===
Edge finders are the most basic type of electronic stud finders that use internal capacitive sensors. They function by detecting changes in wall density, allowing the user to locate the edges of a stud or other hidden object behind the wall surface.

Before use, edge finders must be calibrated over an area of the wall that does not contain a stud. Once calibrated, the device is moved laterally across the surface. A change in the dielectric reading indicates the presence of a stud edge. To locate the full width of the stud, the device should be moved from both directions to identify both edges. The center of the stud can then be determined by marking both edges and measuring the midpoint.

Because edge finders typically use a single sensor, they can be prone to inaccuracy. In some cases, the detected edge may be offset by 25 mm (1 inch) or more from the actual edge of the stud.

=== Center finders ===
Center finders use two sensors to measure the dielectric constant of the wall at separate points. When the readings from both sensors match, the device indicates that it is positioned over the center of a stud. This allows users to locate the stud center without needing to mark its edges.

Center finders typically require calibration prior to use. Surface irregularities, such as wall texturing, can affect sensor movement and impair calibration accuracy.

Unlike edge finders, center finders only need to be moved in one direction to locate a stud.

=== Multi-sensor stud finders ===
Multi-sensor or instant stud finders were recently invented in 2011 by David Dorrough. Multi-sensor stud finders have multiple sensor plates, and do not need to be moved across the wall to detect a stud, overcoming the effects of bumpy wall texture. They use an algorithm to analyze the readings from the multiple sensor plates for a quicker, more accurate indication. Multi-sensor stud finders sense multiple regions of a wall simultaneously including the center of a stud, edges of the stud, and regions without studs. Multi-sensor stud finders will indicate varied widths of studs and the location of multiple studs at the same time.

Because multi-sensor stud finders use multiple readings to determine the location of studs they are also less vulnerable to construction anomalies (such as uneven paint, wall textures, wallpaper, uneven plaster, etc.) that can disorient center and edge finders.

== Radar scanners ==
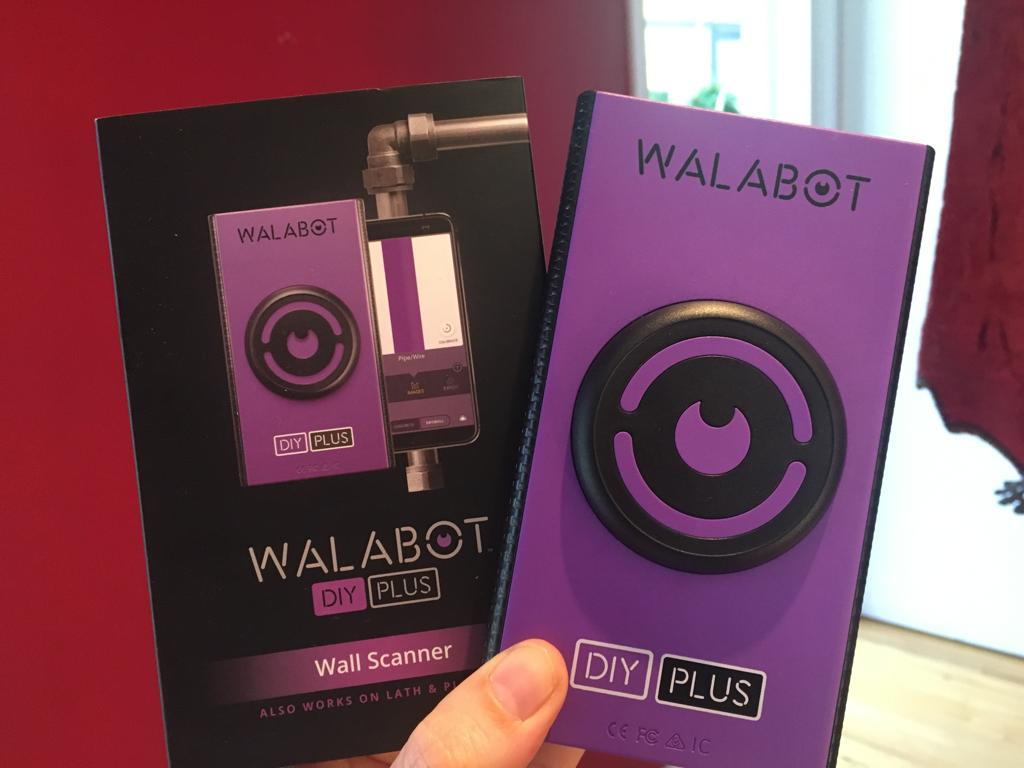
A 3D imaging stud finder that utilizes RF technology to distinguish between materials behind the wall.

Some modern stud finders utilize radar technology, often based on radio frequency (RF) signals, to distinguish between various materials behind wall surfaces. By analyzing raw signals transmitted and received by their sensors, these devices can classify wall types and detect studs, pipes, wires, leaks, and even motion caused by pests or rodents.[citation needed]

Radar-based stud finders can be useful for older buildings with lath and plaster walls, where traditional electronic stud finders may be less effective.

== See also ==
- Wall stud
