= Mir 1 =

Mir 1 may refer to:

- Mir, Soviet space station, first in the Mir series of stations, only completed station in the series
  - Mir EO-1, Mir Principle Expedition 1
  - Mir EP-1, Mir Visiting Expedition 1
- Mir-1 (sub) Russian DSV submarine
- mir-1 microRNA precursor family
- Mir-1, stream cipher algorithm
- Mir (lenses), including Mir-1 and Mir-1V/Mir-1B lenses for M39 or M42 lens mount

== See also ==
- Mir (disambiguation)
