= Geerdijk =

- Village
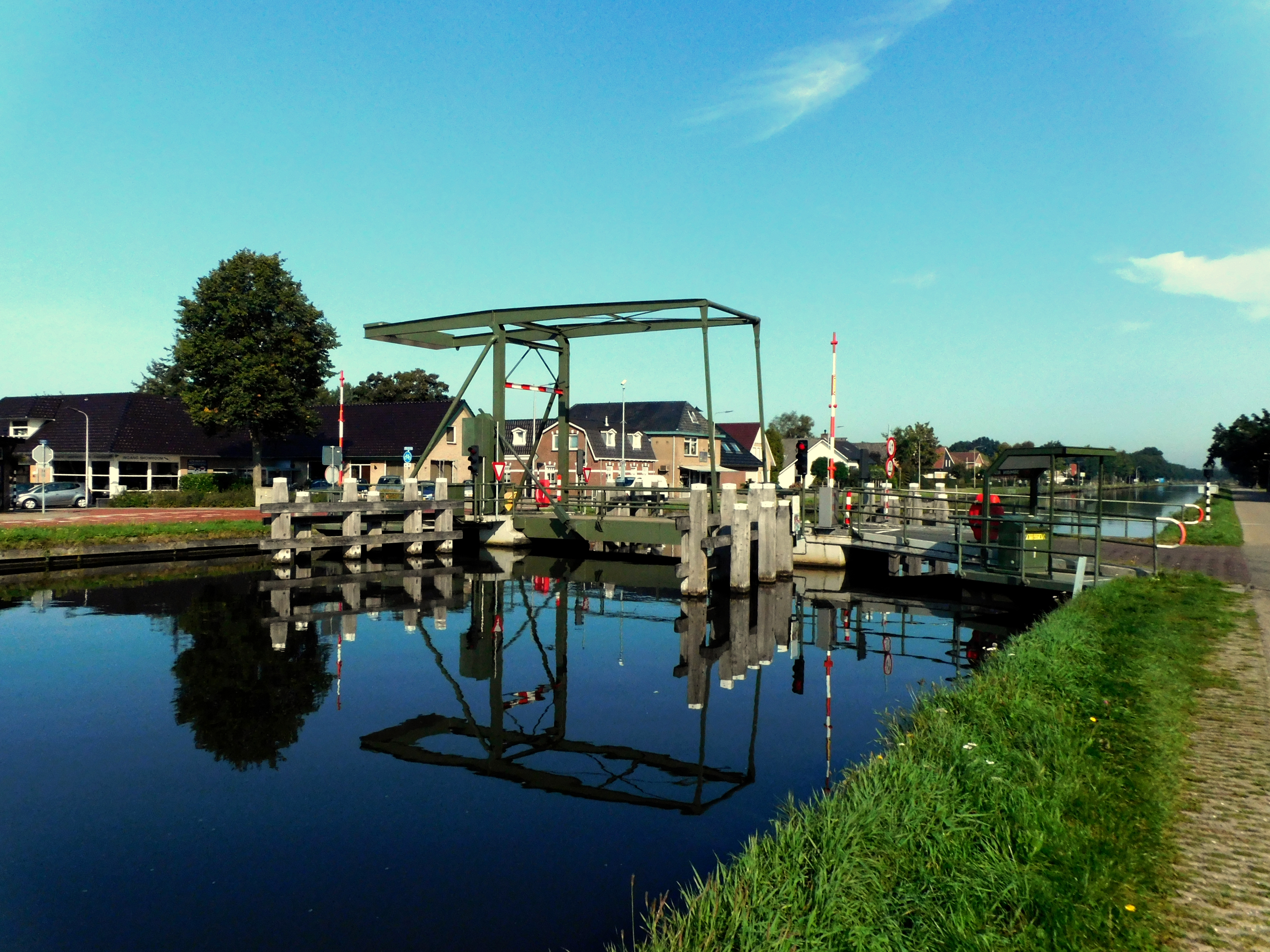
- Drawbridge at Geerdijk

- Location in the Netherlands Geerdijk (Netherlands)
- Coordinates: 52.4756°N 6.5698°E
- Country: Netherlands
- Province: Overijssel
- Municipality: Twenterand

Area
  - Total: 4.52 km^{2} (1.75 sq mi)
- Elevation: 10 m (33 ft)

Population (2021)
  - Total: 995
  - Density: 220/km^{2} (570/sq mi)
- Time zone: UTC+1 (CET)
  - Summer (DST): UTC+2 (CEST)
- Postal code: 7681 & 7686
- Dialing code: 0546

Geerdijk is a village in the Dutch province of Overijssel. It is located in the municipality of Twenterand. It became a village in 2009.

== History ==
Geerdijk was founded in the mid-19th century along the canal Almelo–De Haandrik as a peat excavation village. It was a Catholic enclave which was settled by colonists from neighbouring Germany and the area around Slagharen and Dedemsvaart. In 1868, an independent parish was established.

In 1906, the Geerdijk railway station opened on the Mariënberg–Almelo railway. On 29 April 2016, it was closed, because there were not enough passengers and Arriva wanted to increase the speed of trains to allow an extension of the line to Hardenberg.

Geerdijk used to be part of the municipality of Den Ham. In 2001, it was merged into Twenterand. It was considered a hamlet of Vroomshoop. In 2009, Geerdijk separated from Vroomshoop, and became a village.

== Gallery ==
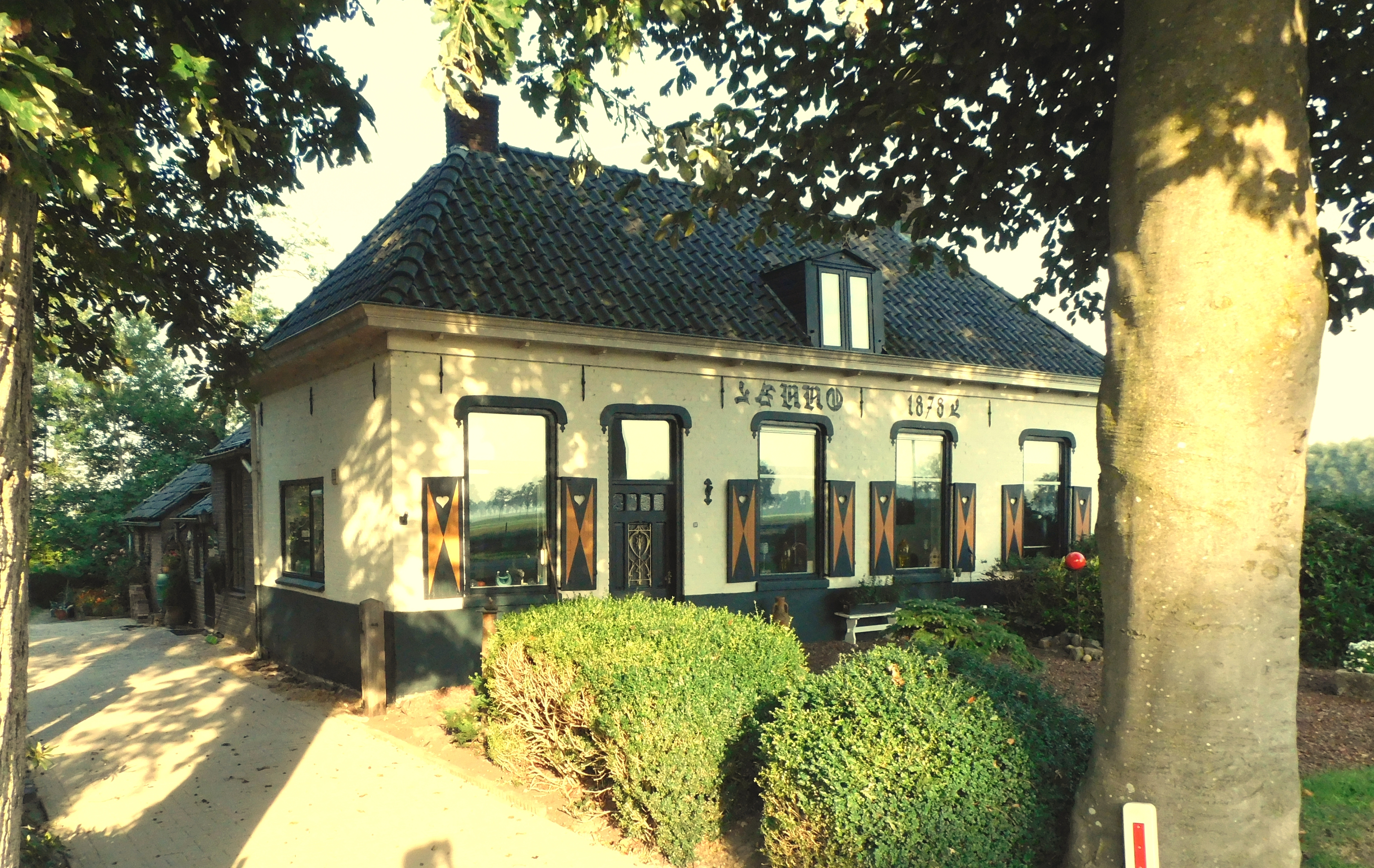
Oldest extant house from 1878

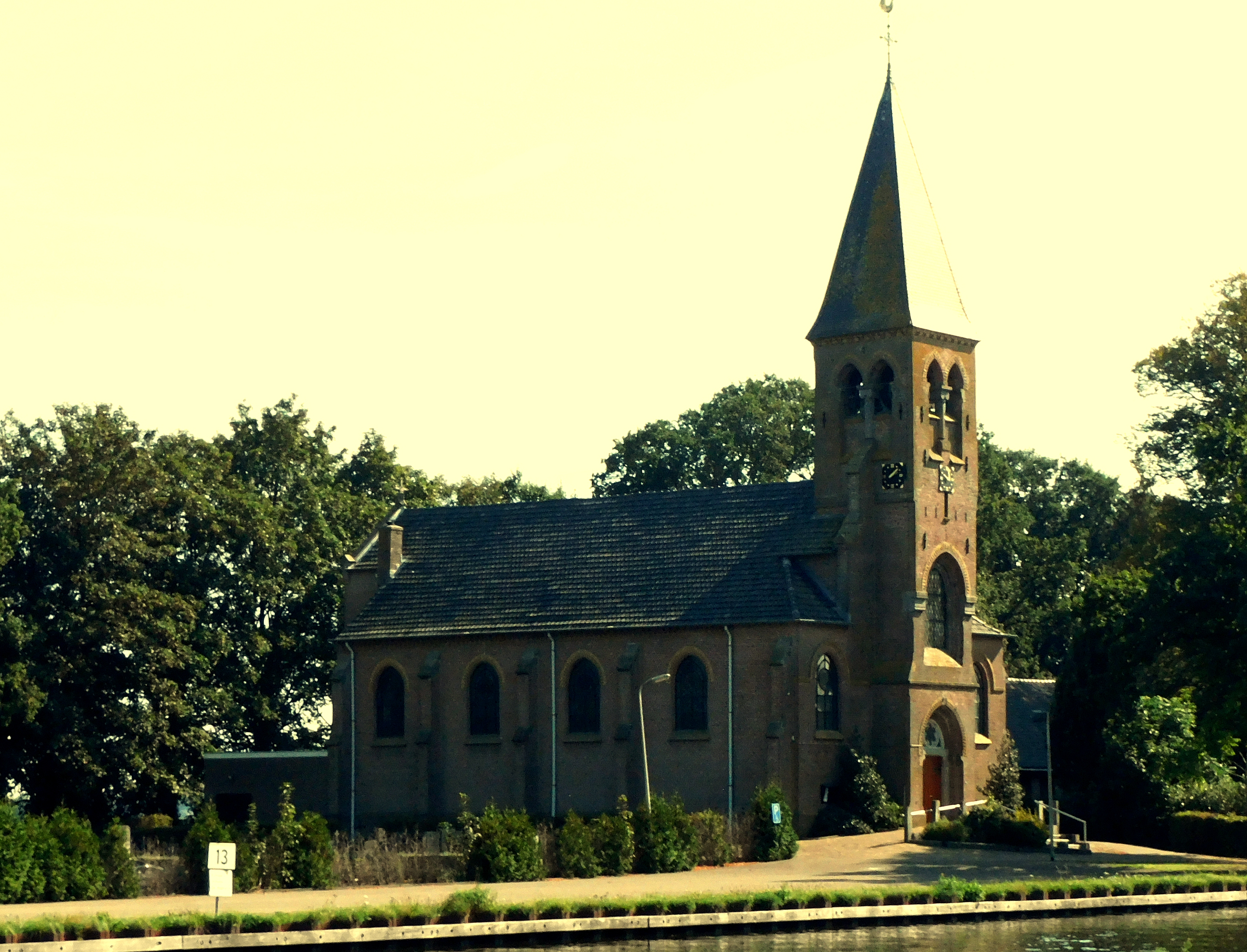
Church of Geerdijk

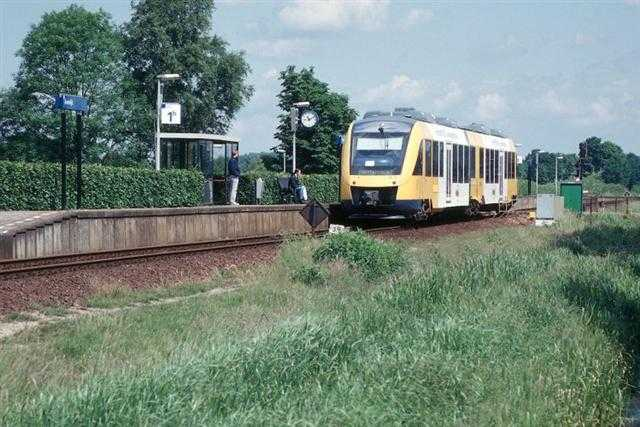
Geerdijk railway station

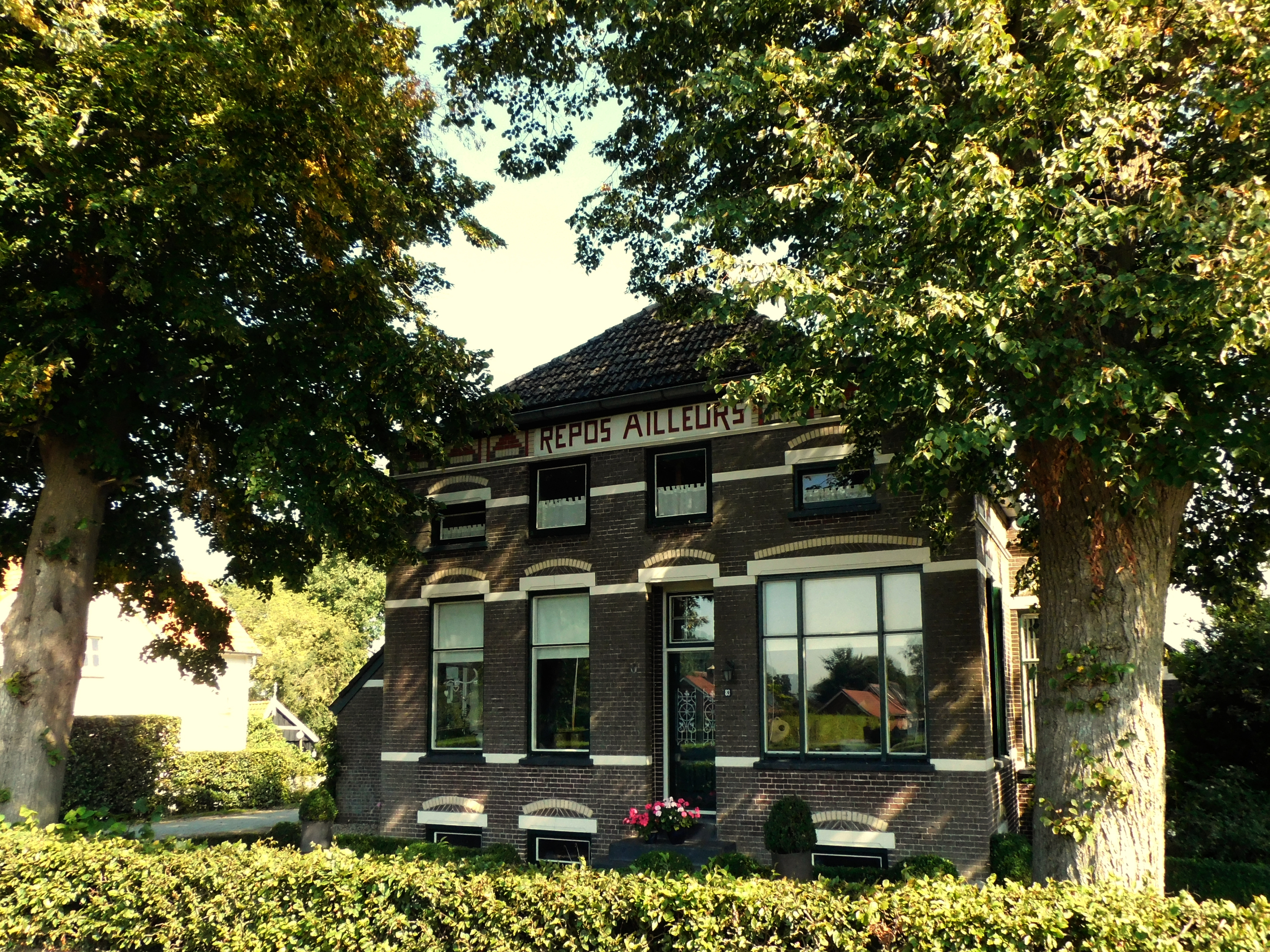
Repos Ailleurs
