= Patu (disambiguation) =

A patu is a generic term for a club or pounder used by the Māori, the indigenous people of New Zealand.

Patu may also refer to:

- Patu (spider), a genus of spiders in the family Symphytognathidae
- Kalateh-ye Mir Hasan, a village in Iran also known as Patu
- Te Pātū, a Māori tribe
- Police Anti-Terrorist Unit, of the British South Africa Police in the Rhodesian Bush War

== See also ==
- Pattu (disambiguation)
