= Mir (disambiguation) =

Mir was a Soviet/Russian space station.

Mir or MIR may also refer to:

== Places ==
- Mir, Belarus, an urban settlement
- Mir Castle Complex, a historic fortified castle in Belarus
- Mir, Vareš, a village in Bosnia and Herzegovina
- Mir (Calixto García), a village in Holguín Province, Cuba
- Mir, Iran, a village in Alborz Province, Iran
- Mir, Lorestan, a village in Lorestan Province, Iran
- Mir mine, an abandoned open-pit diamond mine in East Siberia
- MiR, Musiktheater im Revier, a theater in Gelsenkirchen, Germany
- Mir (theatre), a theatre in Moscow, Russia

== People with the name ==
- Mir (title), a title for a ruler
- Mir (surname), a surname
- Mir (given name), a given name

== Science and technology ==
- Mir (lens), a Soviet photographic lens
- Mir (payment system), a Russian card payment system
- Mid-infrared
- Micropower Impulse Radar
- microRNA (miRNA or miR), a small non-coding RNA molecule
- Multiple isomorphous replacement, a crystallographic technique
- Music information retrieval

=== Computing ===
- Mir, an Independent Media Center content management system
- Mir (software), a computer display server
- MIR (computer), an early Soviet personal computer
- Maximum Information Rate of broadband wireless data
- Mid-level or medium Intermediate representation

== Publishing ==
- Mir Publishers, a Russian publishing house
- Management International Review, a journal
- The Mechanics' Institute Review
- McGill International Review

== Music ==
- Mir (band), a Canadian music group
- Mir (South Korean singer), Bang Chul-yong, member of band MBLAQ
- Mir (album), a 2011 album by Ott

== Organizations ==
- Movimiento de (la) Izquierda Revolucionaria, several South American groups known as Revolutionary Left Movement (disambiguation)
- Mir (ferris wheel manufacturer), Russian company
- Military Intelligence Research (MIR), later MD1, a British WWII military R&D organisation
- Mir (television company)

=== Judaism ===
- Mir yeshiva (Belarus)
- Mir yeshiva (Brooklyn), successor to the Belarus Mir Yeshiva
- Mir yeshiva (Jerusalem), successor to the Belarus Mir Yeshiva

== Transportation ==
- Metropolitan Intercity Railway Company, a Japanese railway company
- STS Mir, a Russian sailing ship
- Mir (submersible), a self-propelled Deep Submergence Vehicle
- MIR, the IATA code for Monastir International Airport in Tunisia
- Mir, a Korean solid-fuel orbital launch vehicle

== Fiction ==
- Mir, a character in Ar tonelico: Melody of Elemia
- Mir, a fictional place in Time's Eye by Arthur C. Clarke and Stephen Baxter

== Other uses ==
- Mir (commune), a type of rural community in Imperial Russia
- MIR contest, rubber subculture event formerly known as Mr. International Rubber
- Mail-in rebate, a coupon
- MIR, Master of International Relations
- mir, ISO 639-3 language code for Isthmus Mixe
- Meriam language or Mir, Torres Strait Islands, Australia
- NTV Mir, a Russian television channel

== See also ==
- Battle of Mir (disambiguation)
- Mir-e Aliabad, in Yazd Province, Iran
- Myrrh
- Mire (disambiguation)
- Mir 1 (disambiguation)
- Mir 2 (disambiguation)
- Mir 3 (disambiguation)
