= Mir (surname) =

Kashmiri tribe of Persian & Central Asian origin

Mir as a surname. Notable people with the surname include:

- Aasmah Mir (born 1971), Scottish-Pakistani journalist
- Alam Mir (born 1944), Afghan wrestler
- Asif Raza Mir, Pakistani actor and producer
- Ahad Raza Mir (born 1993), Pakistani-Canadian actor and musician
- Frank Mir (born 1979), American mixed martial artist, former UFC heavyweight champion
- Hamid Mir (born 1966), Pakistani journalist, columnist and author
- Ibrahim Mir (1874–1956), Pakistani Islamic scholar
- Joan Mir (born 1997), Spanish Grand Prix motorcycle rider, 2020 MotoGP world champion
- Joaquin Mir Trinxet (1873–1940), Spanish modenist painter
- Magín Mir (born 1970), Spanish footballer
- Mir Taqi Mir (1723–1810), Urdu poet
- Mushaf Ali Mir (1947–2003), Pakistani air officer
- Pedro Mir (1913–2000), Dominican poet and writer
- Rafa Mir (born 1997), Spanish footballer
- Rasul Mir, Kashmiri poet
- Sajid Mir, Pakistani militant member of Lashkar-e-Taiba
- Sajid Mir, Pakistani politician
- Samad Mir (1893–1959), Kashmiri poet
- Sana Mir (born 1986), Pakistani cricketer

== See also ==
- Mir (tribe), a tribal name
- Mir (given name), a combined name for person
- Mir (title), a singular beginning on name for person
- Mirpur, a land name related to Mir peoples
- Mirpuri, a conjugation or plural name related to Mirpur lands
- Mirza (name), a singular multi-ethnic on name for half Mir person
- Meer (disambiguation)
- Mir (disambiguation)
