= Mir Mohammad (given name) =

Mir Mohammad, Mir Muhammad, or Mir Muhammed may refer to:

- Mir Mohammad Ali, a Pakistani television comedian
- Mir Mohammad Ali Khan, a prince and Mughal general
- Mir Mohammad Asim Kurd Gello (b. 1957), a Pakistani politician
- Mir Mohammad Nasiruddin, a Bangladeshi politician
- Mir Muhammad Ali Rind (1944–2022), a Pakistani politician
- Mir Muhammad Sadiq Umrani, a Pakistani politician
- Mir Muhammad Yousaf Badini, a Pakistani politician
- Mir Muhammed Ali Khan, a Pakistani stockbroker
