= Pattu =

Pattu or Pattoo can refer to:

- Traditional name of silk in South India in Tamil and Telugu languages
- A common family name in the Kashmiri Pandit community
- A kind of woollen fabric used to make Pakol hats

== See also ==
- Patu (disambiguation)
