= Meer, Overijssel =

Meer
- Hamlet
- Location in the Netherlands Meer (Netherlands)
- Coordinates: 52°27′42″N 6°27′40″E
- Country: Netherlands
- Province: Overijssel
- Municipality: Twenterand

Area
  - Total: 6.95 km^{2} (2.68 sq mi)
- Elevation: 7 m (23 ft)

Population (2021)
  - Total: 385
  - Density: 55.4/km^{2} (143/sq mi)
- Time zone: UTC+1 (CET)
  - Summer (DST): UTC+2 (CEST)
- Postal code: 7683
- Dialing code: 0546

Meer [mɪːr] is a hamlet in the Dutch province of Overijssel. It is located in the municipality of Twenterand, about 2 km west of the town of Den Ham.

Meer is a statistical entity, but the postal authorities have placed it under Den Ham. It was first mentioned in 1333 as Mederen. In 1840, it was home to 242 people.
