= Mir 2 =

Mir 2, Mir-2, or MIR2 may refer to either:

- Dassault Mirage 2000, French fighter jet (ICAO aircraft type designator: MIR2)
- Mir-2 (DOS-8, Salyut 9) the never-assembled successor to the Mir space station
  - Zvezda (ISS module), the core module for Mir-2, now part of the International Space Station
- Mir EO-2, Mir Principle Expedition 2, to the Mir-1 space station
- Mir EP-2, Mir Visiting Expedition 2, to the Mir-1 space station
- Mir-2 (sub), a Russian DSV submarine
- MIR-2 computer, Russian early computers
- mir-2 microRNA precursor
- The Legend of Mir 2, an MMORPG

== See also ==
- Mir (disambiguation)
