= Mir 3 =

Mir 3 may refer to:

- Mir EO-3, Mir Principle Expedition 3, to the Mir-1 space station
- Mir EP-3, Mir Visiting Expedition 3, to the Mir-1 space station
- Mir-3 microRNA precursor family
- The Legend of Mir 3, an MMORPG

== See also ==
- Mir (disambiguation)
