= Mir Sadat =

American national security policy expert

Mir Sadat is an American author, military officer, professor, and former policy director of the United States National Security Council.

== Early life and education ==
Sadat was born in Germany's former capital city of Bonn. His parents were born in Kabul, Afghanistan. He emigrated from Germany to the United States at the age of 9. Sadat finished high school and higher education in southern California.

He has a PhD from Claremont Graduate University.

== Career ==
In the U.S. Navy, Sadat's assignments included being a Naval Attache for the U.S. Department of Defense, Space Policy Strategist for the Chief of Naval Operations, a Space Operations Officer in the U.S. Third and Tenth Fleet, an Intelligence Officer at U.S. Africa Command, a Flag Aide to the Secretary of the Navy, and a Policy Expert in the Executive Office of the President.

Sadat was a professor at the National Intelligence University in Washington, D.C., where he specialized in Space Policy, Afghanistan, Pakistan, and Iran issues. He has also taught in the Center of Security Studies at Georgetown University, Pitzer College, and San Diego State University. Sadat has served as adjunct scholar with the Modern War Institute at West Point, a senior fellow in the Atlantic Council's Scowcroft Center for Strategy and Security, and post-doctorate fellow at University of California, Berkeley. He has served on the advisory board of the University of Southern California’s Center for Research in Space Technologies.

Sadat served as a Director at the U.S. National Security Council and led the interagency coordination on defense and space policy issues. During his time in the White House, the NSC oversaw the establishment of the U.S. Space Force and U.S. Space Command.

Sadat led multiple key projects with NASA to reduce U.S. risk and dependencies in the US Space Program on foreign nations who view America as an adversary.

While on the NSC, Sadat worked on an initiative to power space vehicles with modular nuclear reactors. He advanced space policies on supply chain, nuclear power, and strategic technical competition. He drafted, sought interagency inputs, and coordinated approval for presidential-level orders including Executive Order 13972 on Promoting Small Modular Reactors for National Defense and Space Exploration (January 2021), National Security Presidential Memorandum-20 on the Launch of Spacecraft Containing Space Nuclear Systems (August 2019), and the National Strategy for Space Nuclear Power and Propulsion (Space Policy Directive-6, December 2020).

Since October 2025, he has served as a Policy Strategist at the Office of Management and Budget (OMB) in the Executive Office of the President. At OMB, he led interagency efforts to strengthen national security programs, promote U.S. manufacturing, and build resilient supply chains in space, technology, and maritime sectors.

Along with co-author Bruce Cahan, Sadat authored U.S. Space Policy for the New Space Age: Competing on the Final Frontier, proposing policy changes to address economic aspects of American space policy. He also co-authored “Space Budgeting for Modern Times.”

In 2020, he founded Space Force Journal which launched its first issue in January 2021. Sadat departed the journal in January 2022 to found Dauntless Space devoted to understanding and advancing U.S. and allied spacepower.
