= Den Ham =

- Village
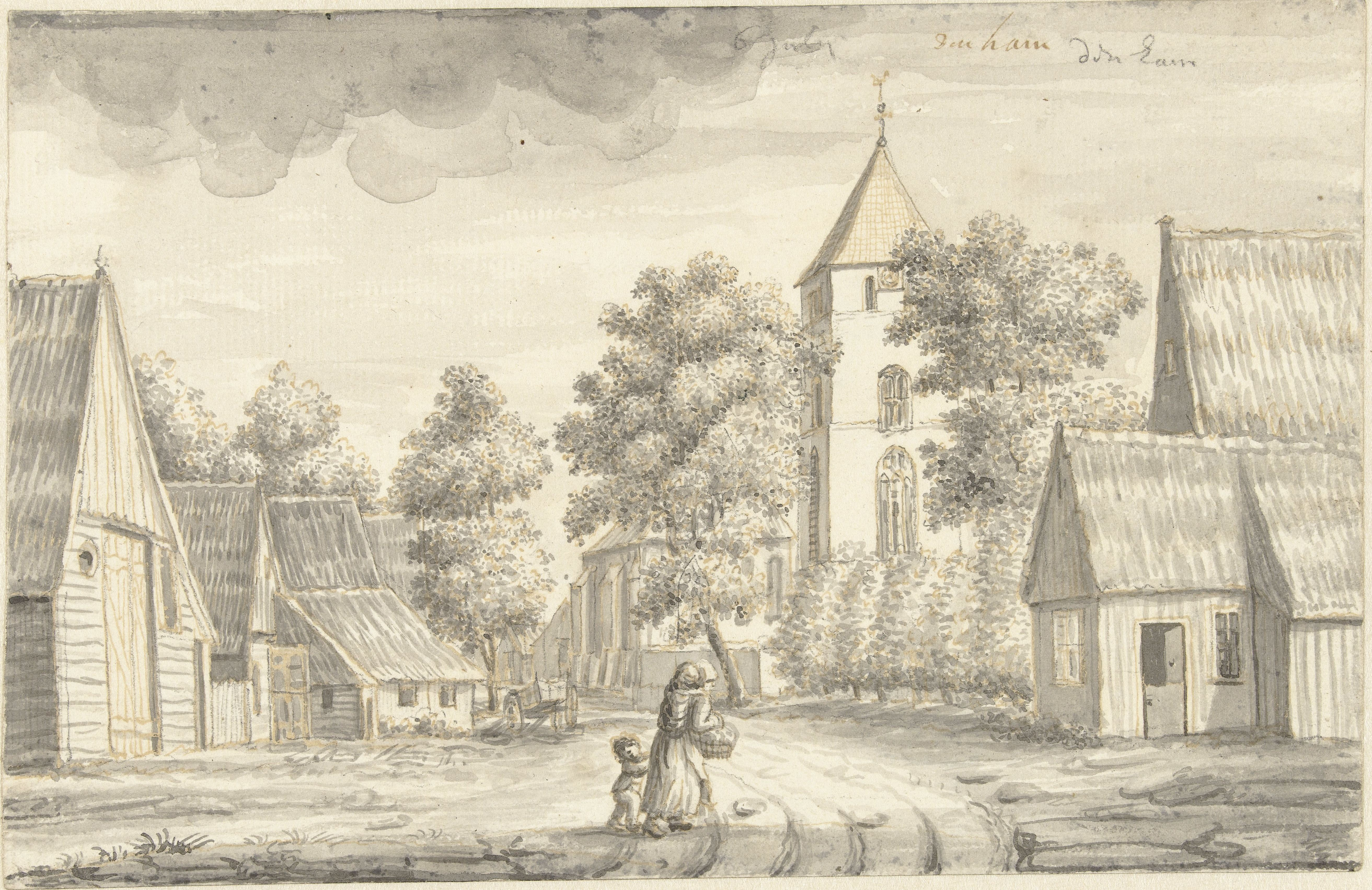
- Drawing of Den Ham (1761–1828)

- Flag Coat of arms

- Location in the Netherlands Den Ham (Netherlands)
- Coordinates: 52°27′54″N 6°29′39″E
- Country: Netherlands
- Province: Overijssel
- Municipality: Twenterand

Area
  - Total: 26.98 km^{2} (10.42 sq mi)
- Elevation: 7 m (23 ft)

Population (2021)
  - Total: 5,830
  - Density: 216/km^{2} (560/sq mi)
- Time zone: UTC+1 (CET)
  - Summer (DST): UTC+2 (CEST)
- Postal code: 7683
- Dialing code: 0546

Den Ham [dɛn ɦɑm] is a village in the Dutch province of Overijssel. It is located in the municipality of Twenterand, about 15 km northwest of Almelo.

Den Ham was a separate municipality until 2001, when it became a part of Vriezenveen. It was subsequently renamed Twenterand in 2002.

== History ==
Den Ham is an esdorp which was first mentioned in 1333. During the Dutch Revolt it was under frequent attack. In 1840, it was home to 748 people. In the mid-19th century, it was surpassed by Vroomshoop which had better connections to the outside world. In 1914, the dairy factory De Eensgezindheid opened in Den Ham.

In September 1943 Australian bomber pilot Les Knight, one of the members of No. 617 Squadron RAF (commonly known as "The Dambusters"), crashed near the village. He was able to allow his entire crew to bail out but was unable to land the aircraft without crashing. Knight is buried at the local cemetery and a monument has been erected at the crash site.

== Gallery ==
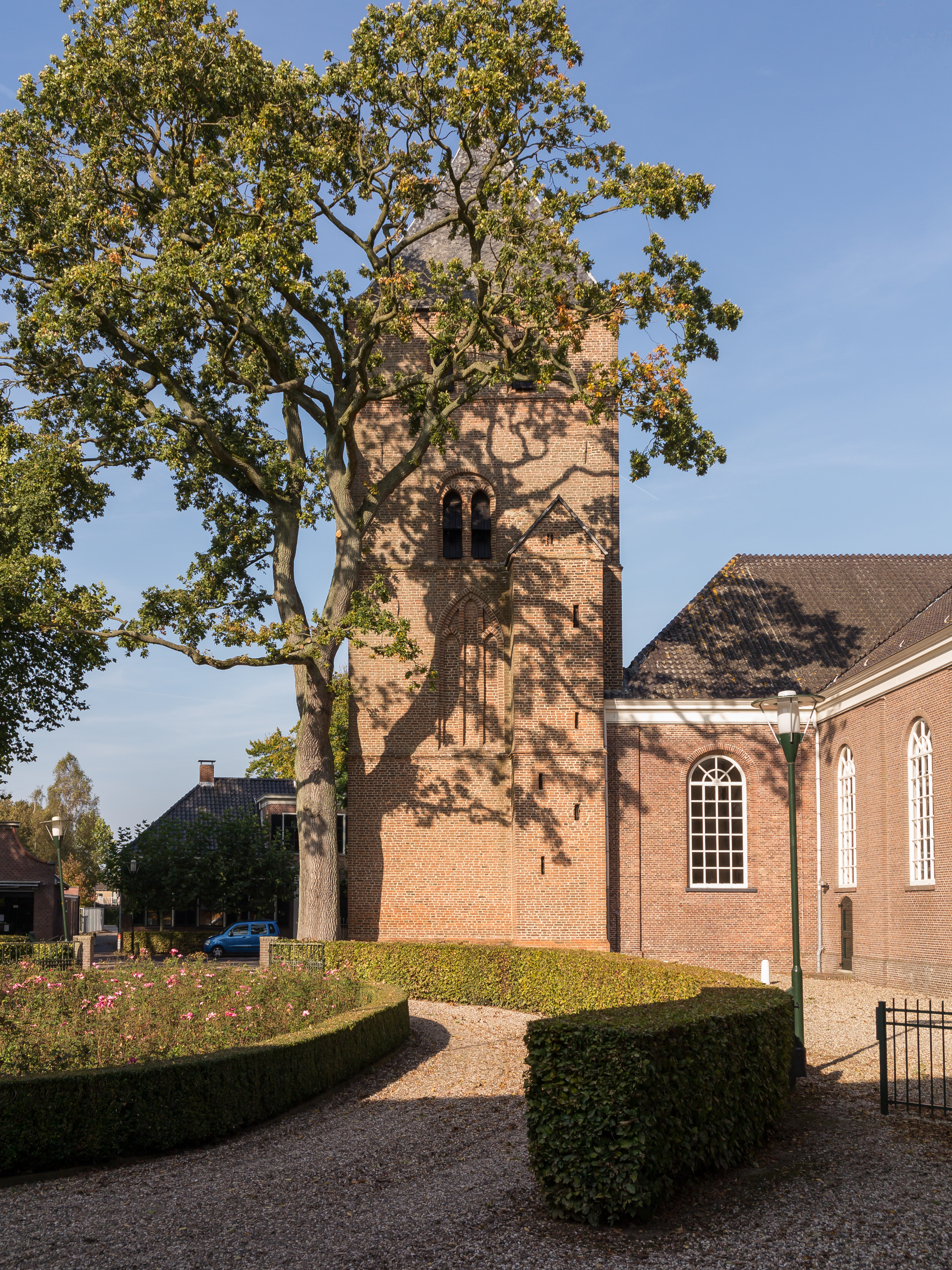
Den Ham, reformed church

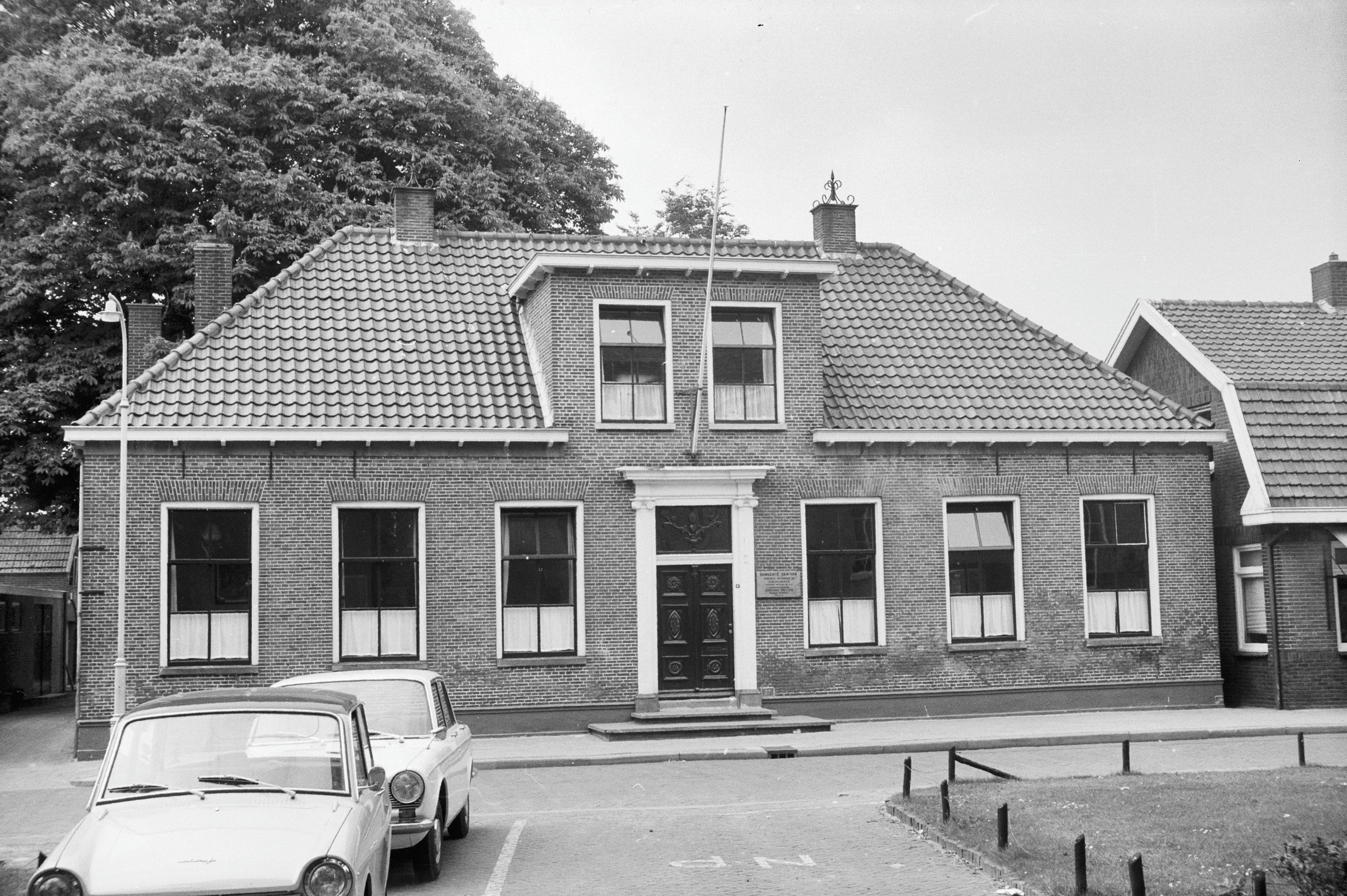
Former town hall (1966)

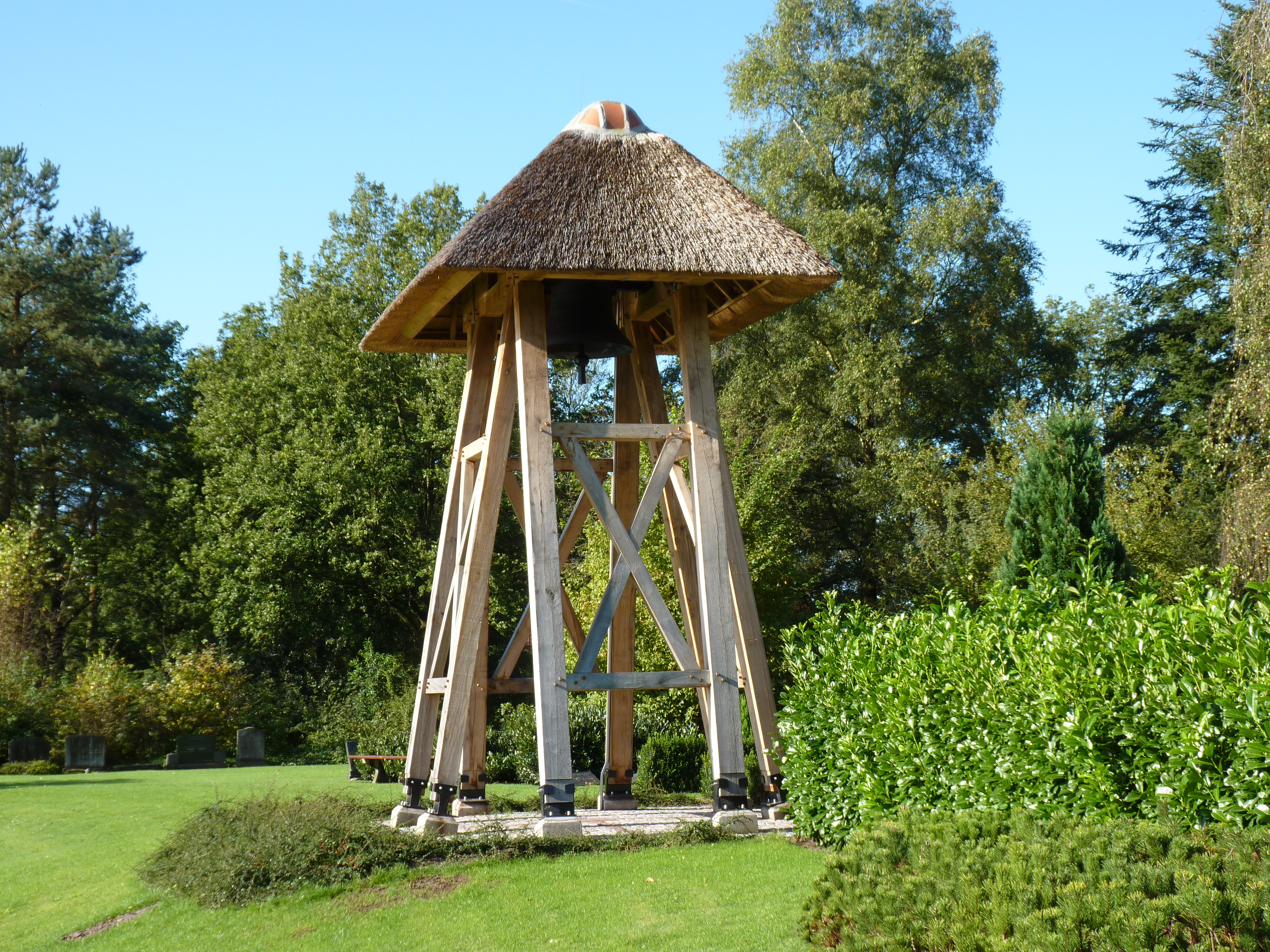
Bell tower

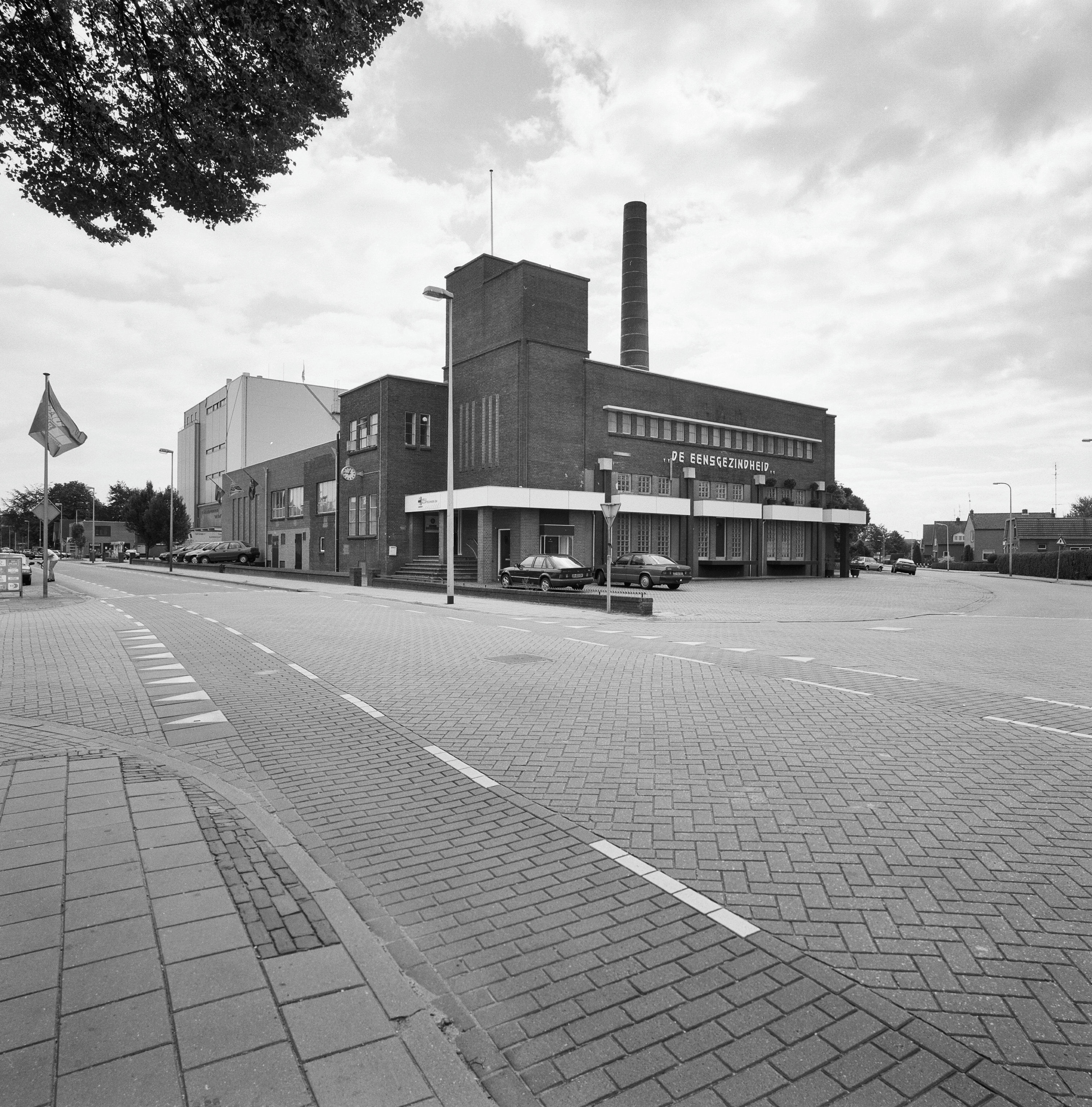
Dairy factory in Den Ham

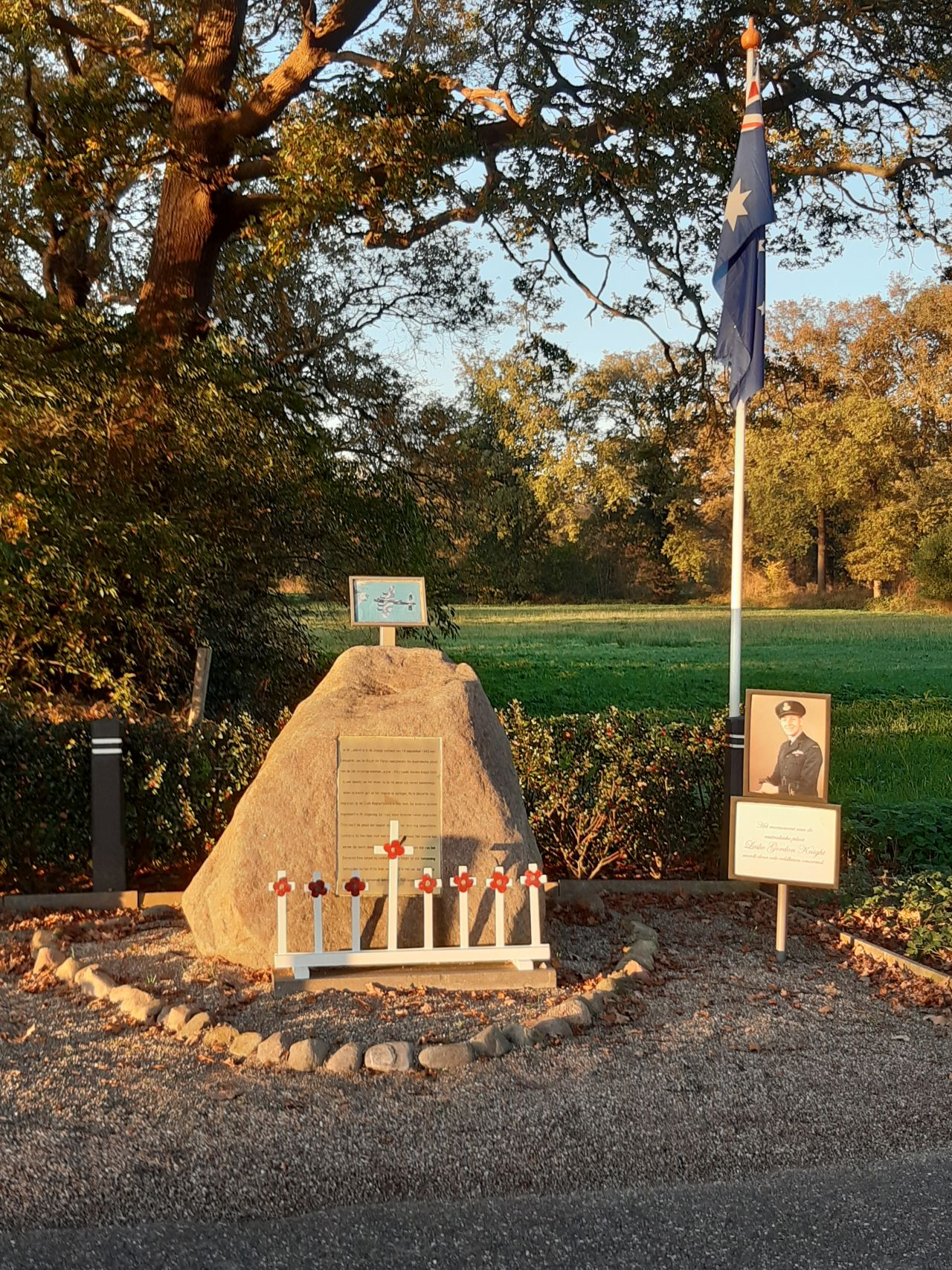
Monument for Leslie Gordon Knight, DSO
