= Vroomshoop =

- Town
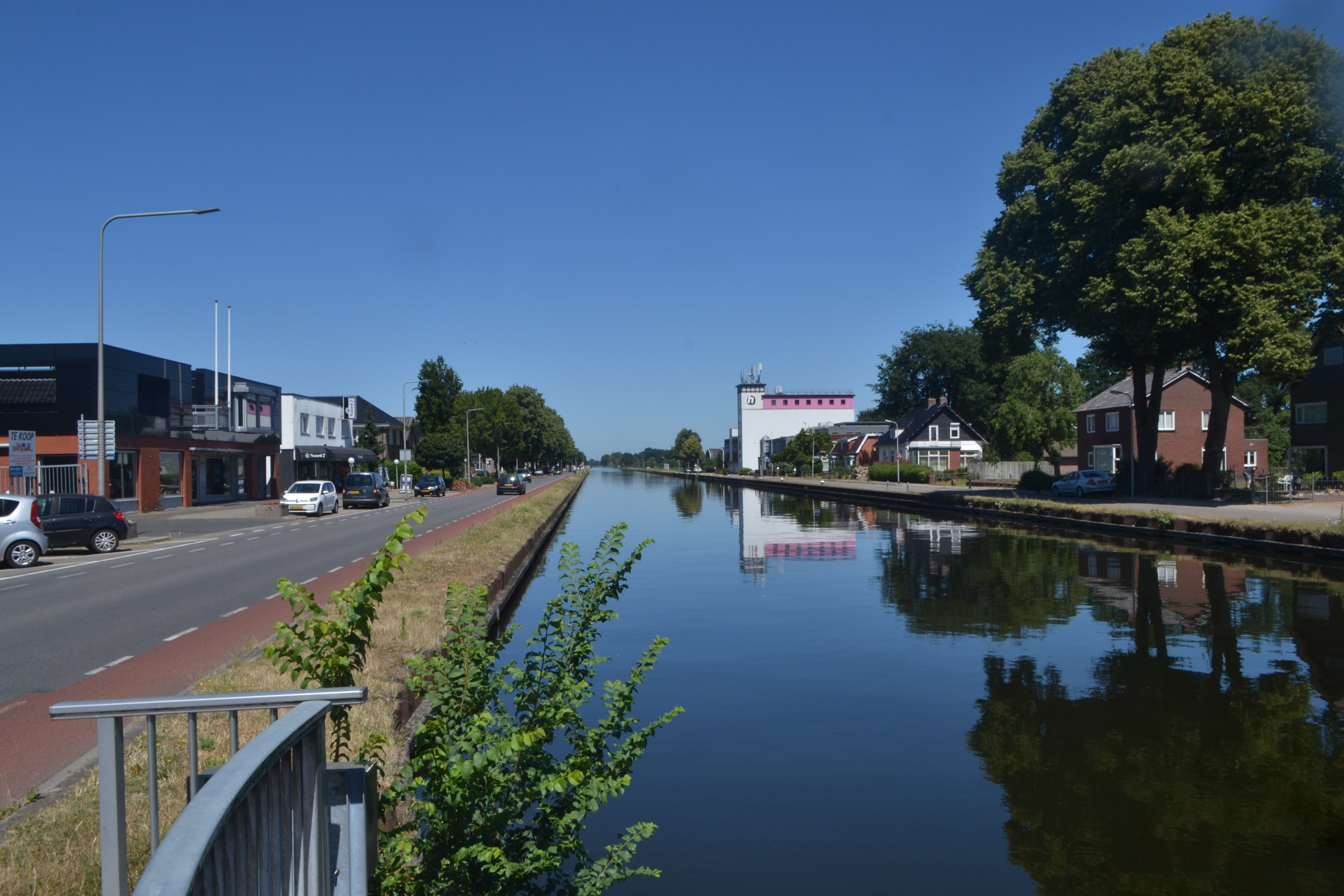

- Location in the Netherlands Vroomshoop (Netherlands)
- Coordinates: 52°27′37″N 6°33′57″E
- Country: Netherlands
- Province: Overijssel
- Municipality: Twenterand

Area
  - Total: 17.08 km^{2} (6.59 sq mi)
- Elevation: 10 m (33 ft)

Population (2021)
  - Total: 9.400
  - Density: 0.5504/km^{2} (1.425/sq mi)
- Time zone: UTC+1 (CET)
  - Summer (DST): UTC+2 (CEST)
- Postal code: 7681
- Dialing code: 0546

Vroomshoop is a town located at the center of the municipality Twenterand in the Dutch province of Overijssel and was founded around 1859. The earliest inhabitants lived from the peat that was found in the nearby area.

Farmers from the Groningen area played an important role by excavating peat and turning it into farmland here. They settled mainly on the Tonnendijk Road. The Groninger-farms are still on the Tonnendijk.

== History ==
In 1859, the canal Almelo-De Haandrik was dug, and a peat colony developed along the canal. Around 1875, the economy became based on potatoes and colonists from Groningen and Drenthe settled in the area. The Saint Willibrord Church was finished in 1868. In 1906, the village still contained 109 sod houses. In 2009, the village of Geerdijk separated from Vroomshoop.

== Transportation ==
In 1906 a train station was built in Vroomshoop, because of the NOLS track from Mariënberg to Almelo. The original name for this station was "Den Ham - Vroomshoop", it was changed to "Vroomshoop" in 1952 because of the distance between Den Ham and Vroomshoop.

Since 2014, Arriva has operated this service.

At one time, there was a vlotbrug at Vroomshoop.

== Triathlon ==
Triatlon Vroomshoop started as a one-off event in 2009 and has now become an annual event which hosts approximately 700 athletes every year. Starting 2016 it has also been the host of the Schuiteman 2deDivisie Noord, a part of the national second division championship.

== Dragon boat Festival ==
For the 6th time in 2014 organised by "de Smoezen", Vroomshoops carnival association. A Chinese tradition at the canal, a spectacular boat race by different regional teams.

== Notable people ==
- Christian Kist, 2012 BDO World Darts Champion
- Jarno Hams, 7 times Strongest man of the Netherlands

== Gallery ==
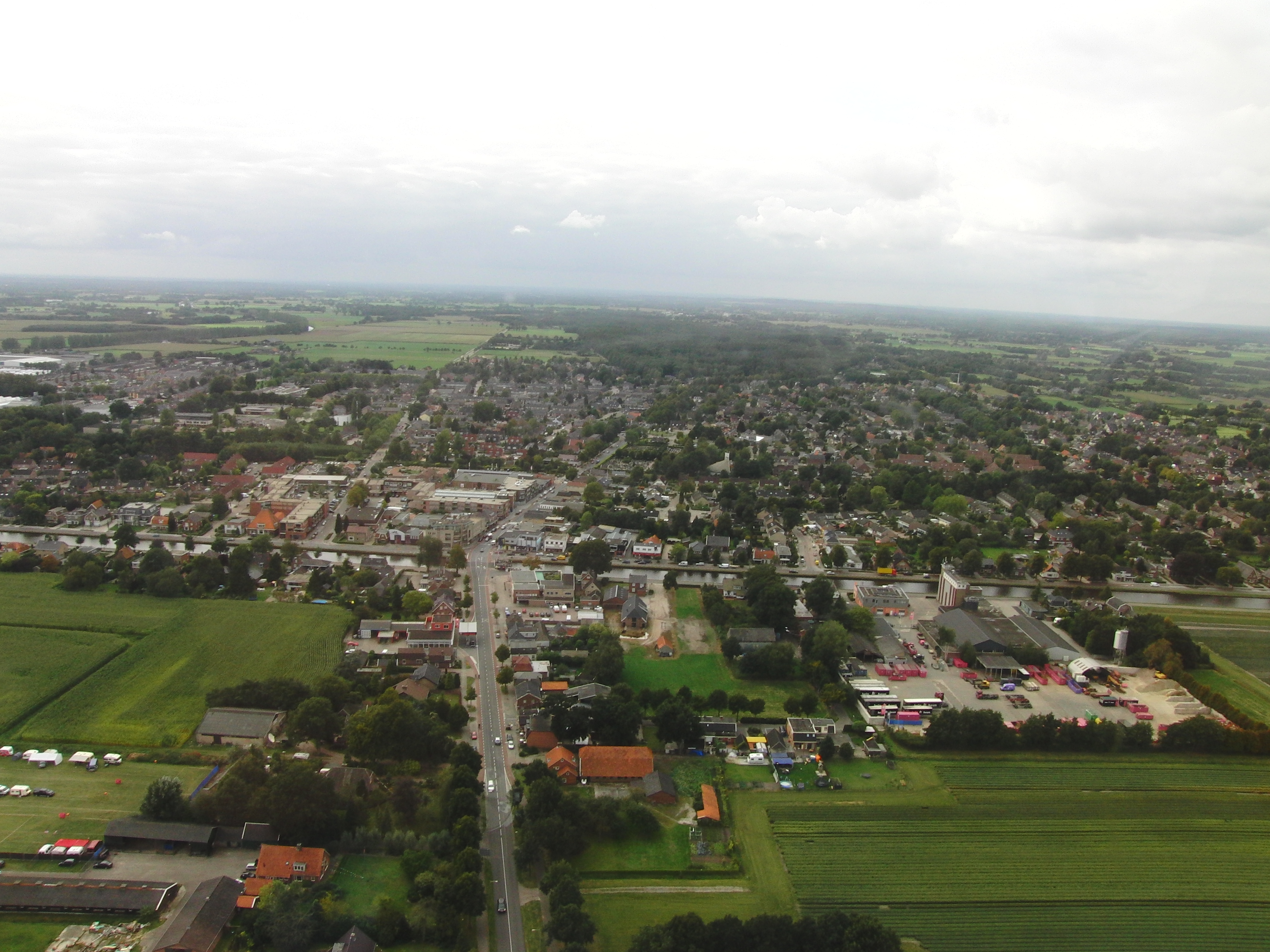
Aerial view of Vroomshoop

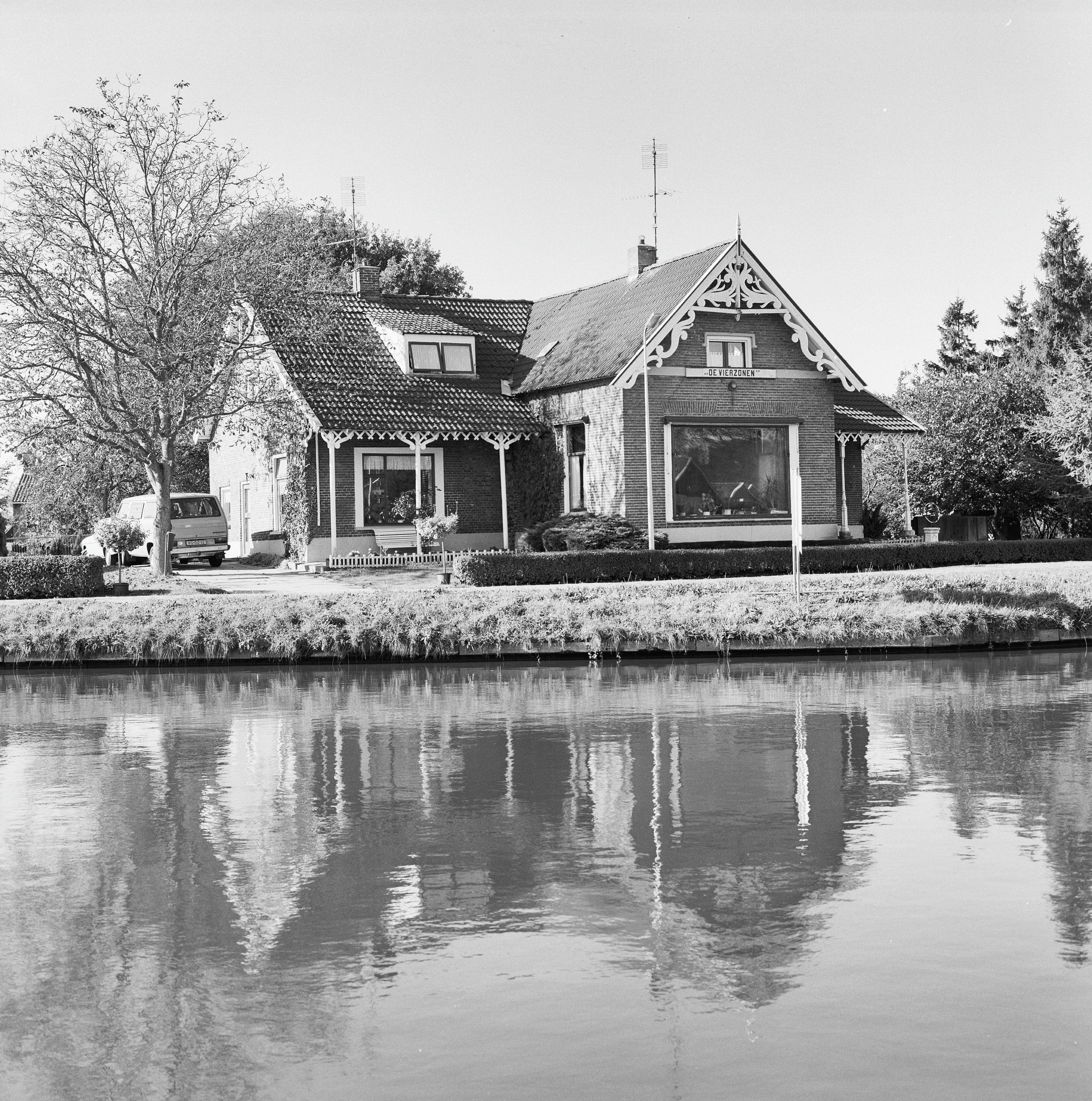
Villa Vroomshoop

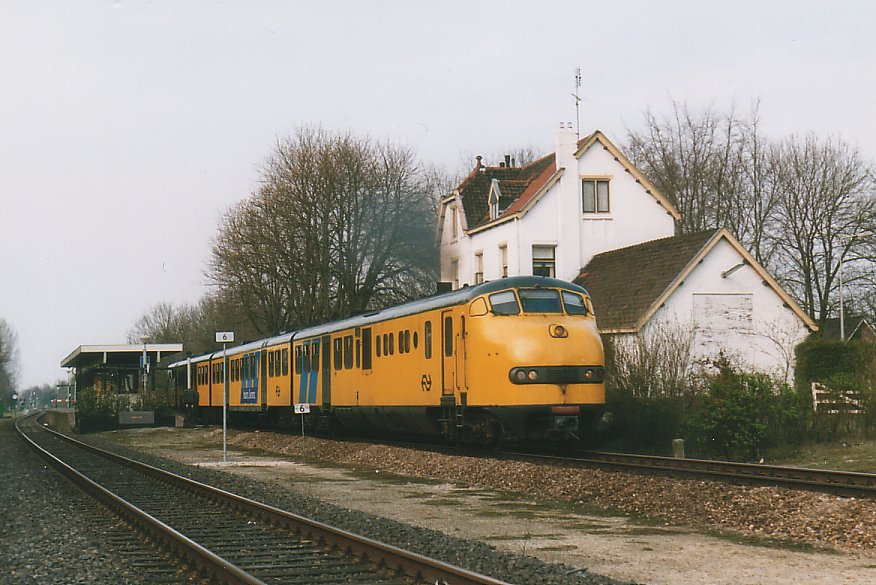
Vroomshoop railway station

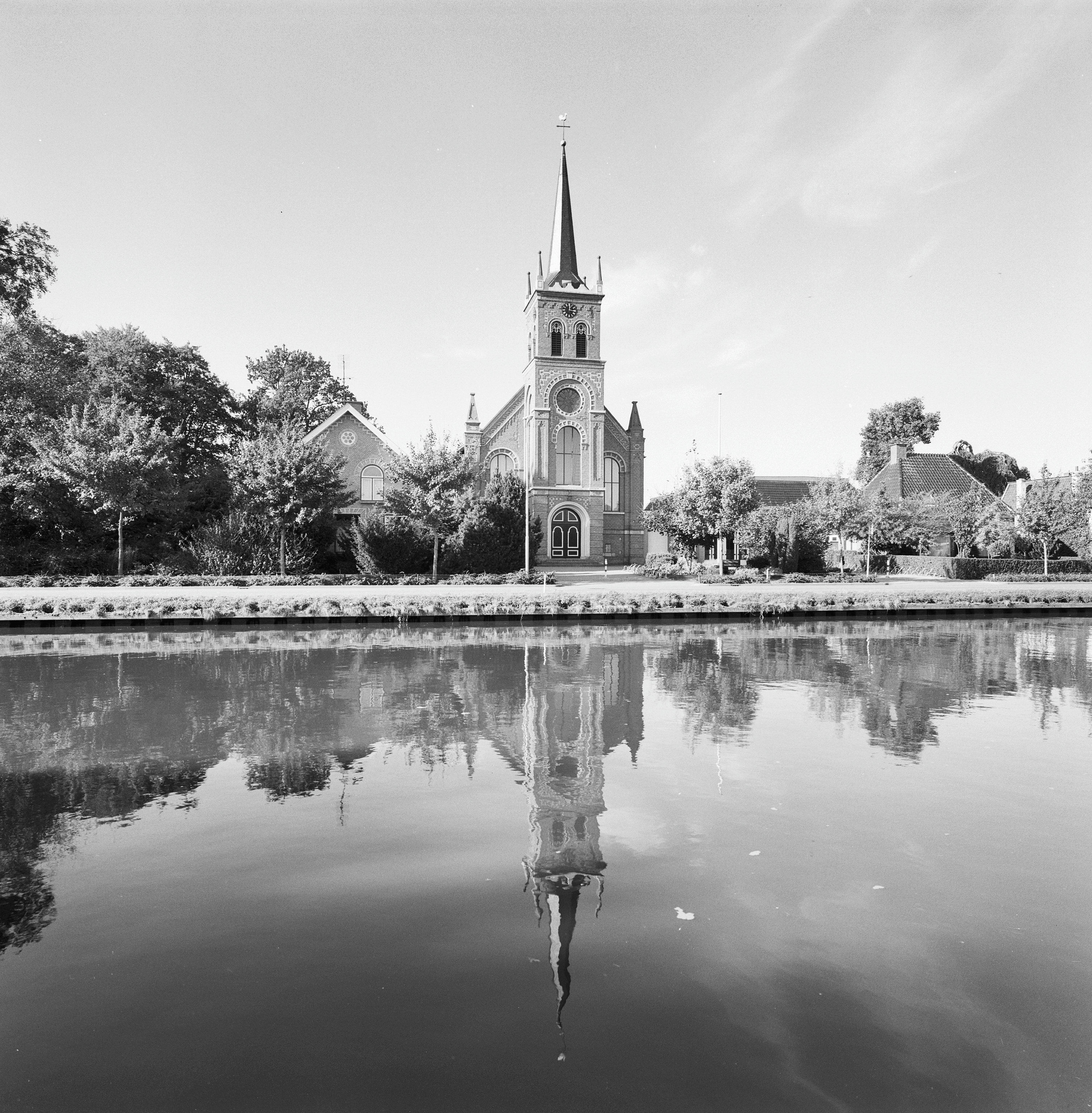
Church in Vroomshoop
