= Mir Ali =

Mir Ali may refer to:

== People ==
- Mir Ali (cricketer) (born 1988), Pakistani cricketer
- Mir Ali Dost Bugti, a Pakistani judge
- Mir Ali Murad Talpur, the second ruler of the Mankani Talpurs state of Mirpurkhas in what is now Sindh Province, Pakistan
- Mir Ali Shir Nava'i, a 15th-century Central Asian politician and mystic
- Mir Ali Tabrizi, a 14th-century Persian calligrapher
- Mihr 'Ali, also spelt Mir Ali, a 19th-century Persian painter
- Mirali Qashqai (1907–1977), Azerbaijani and Soviet geologist
- Mirali Sharipov (born 1987), Uzbekistani judoka

== Places ==
- Mir Ali, Pakistan or Mirali, a town in western Pakistan
  - Mir Ali Subdivision, the larger administrative division
- Mirali, Iran, a village in Iran
- Mirali Mausoleum, in Azerbaijan
