= Geerdijk railway station =

Former railway station in Twenterand, the Netherlands

Geerdijk
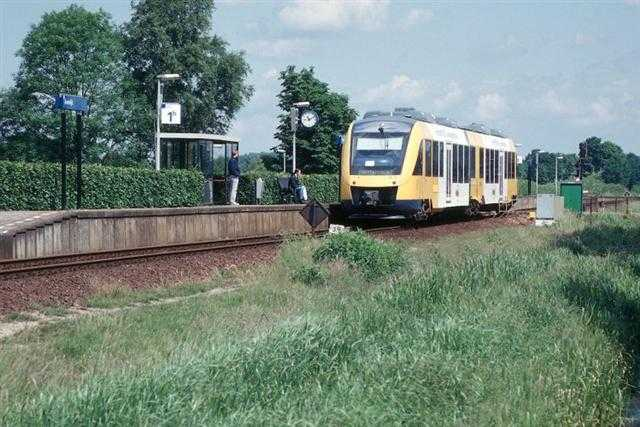

General information
- Location: Netherlands
- Coordinates: 52°28′35″N 6°34′00″E
- Line: Mariënberg–Almelo railway

History
- Opened: 1 October 1906
- Closed: 29 April 2016
Location
- Location within Netherlands

Geerdijk was a railway station in Geerdijk, The Netherlands. The station was opened on 1 October 1906 and is on the Mariënberg–Almelo railway. The station was on a single track line but had 2 platforms. This is because there is a level crossing in between. The train runs over the level crossing first and then stops on the platform. This is so that the level crossing doesn't have to be closed while the train waits.

The station was announced as the second-least used station in the Netherlands in 2005 with an average of 60 passengers a day. For this reason, the railway station was closed on 29 April 2016. This allows Arriva to extend the train service from Mariënberg to Hardenberg..

== Platforms ==
- Platform 1a is the northern one, formerly offering the service to Mariënberg.
- Platform 1b is the southern one, formerly offering the service to Almelo.
