= Mir Hasani =

Mir Hasani ميرحسني
- Village
- Location within Iran
- Coordinates: 27°25′22″N 53°15′19″E
- Country: Iran
- Province: Fars
- County: Lamerd
- Bakhsh: Central
- Rural District: Howmeh

Population (2006)
  - Total: 227
- Time zone: UTC+3:30 (IRST)
  - Summer (DST): UTC+4:30 (IRDT)

Mir Hasani (Persian: ميرحسني, also Romanized as Mīr Ḩasanī; also known as Mīr 'asanī and Mīr 'oseynī) is a village in Howmeh Rural District, in the Central District of Lamerd County, Fars province, Iran. At the 2006 census, its population was 227, in 52 families.
