= Mir, Vareš =

Village in Vareš, Bosnia and Herzegovina

Mir
- Village
- Location within Bosnia and Herzegovina
- Coordinates: 44.1167376°N 18.3198649°E
- Country: Bosnia and Herzegovina
- Entity: Federation of Bosnia and Herzegovina
- Canton: Zenica-Doboj
- Municipality: Vareš

Area
  - Total: 2.03 sq mi (5.26 km^{2})

Population (2013)
  - Total: 22
  - Density: 11/sq mi (4.2/km^{2})
- Time zone: UTC+1 (CET)
  - Summer (DST): UTC+2 (CEST)

Mir is a village in the municipality of Vareš, Bosnia and Herzegovina.

== Demographics ==
According to the 2013 census, its population was 22.

Ethnicity in 2013
Ethnicity	Number	Percentage
Croats	18	81.8%
Bosniaks	4	18.2%
Total	22	100%
