= Mowr, Yazd =

Mowr مور
- Village
- Location within Iran
- Coordinates: 31°39′53″N 53°49′17″E
- Country: Iran
- Province: Yazd
- County: Taft
- Bakhsh: Central
- Rural District: Aliabad

Population (2006)
  - Total: 201
- Time zone: UTC+3:30 (IRST)
  - Summer (DST): UTC+4:30 (IRDT)

Mowr (Persian: مور), also known as Mīr-e ‘Alīābād, Mohreh-ye ‘Alīābād, and Mowr-e ‘Alīābād, is a village in Aliabad Rural District, in the Central District of Taft County, Yazd Province, Iran. At the 2006 census, its population was 201, in 71 families.
