= Mir Seyyed Abd al-Latif Shushtari =

Iranian explorer and writer (1759–1806)

- Born: 1759; Shushtar, Iran
- Died: 1806 (aged 46–47); India
- Relatives: Abd al-Qasim Mir Alam (cousin)
- Writing career
- Notable work: Tohfat al-Alam

Mir Seyyed Abd al-Latif Shushtari (Persian: میر سید عبداللطیف شوشتری) was an Iranian traveller from Shushtar, who is principally known for his travelogue Tohfat al-Alam.

== Biography ==
Mir Seyyed Abd al-Latif Shushtari was born in the city of Shushtar in 1759. He belonged to a family of Musavi sayyid stock (descendants of the Islamic prophet Muhammad through Musa al-Kazim). He was also descended from Nematollah Jazayeri, a distinguished jurist in 16th-century Safavid Iran. Before moving to Hindustan (India), Shushtari completed his education in Shushtar and Shiraz. Once there, he made extensive travels. When Shushtari arrived in Calcutta in 1788, he met Mirza Abu Taleb Khan and made money from lucrative trading with his brother, who lived in Basra. A few years later, Shushtari moved to Asaf Jahi-ruled Hyderabad, where he was under the patronage of his cousin, Abd al-Qasim Mir Alam, a powerful figure in the city. Shushtari's family later became embroiled in a scandal involving Mir Alam and the East India Company. This led to Shushtari getting a house arrest, where he wrote his travelogue Tohfat al-Alam, a tribute to Mir Alam that recounts Shushtari's life and knowledge. He added more material at the end of the travelogue once his family's fortunes improved, in which he describes meeting a young Agha Ahmad Behbahani, who had just arrived in Hyderabad in 1805. Shushtari died the following year.

== Tohfat al-Alam ==
The Safavid heritage of Iran came to define the country throughout the 18th-century, particularly after the dynasty was overthrown. The term "Qizilbash" was used frequently, highlighting this connection. Shushtari describes the attempts of the Iranian shah (king) Agha Mohammad Khan Qajar to persuade the Georgians to reaffirm their allegiance to Iran in order to finish the restoration of the Safavid realm. The army of Iran is referred to as "Qizilbash warriors [against non-Muslims] (ghāzīyān-i Qizilbāsh)" by Shushtari, who brings it together with another description, "the bold ones of Iran (dilīrān-i Īrān)," thus making the name "Qizilbash" a designation for someone who is a member of the Iranian realm.

Shushtari portrays Agha Mohammad Khan's actions as the restoration of Safavid Iran, just like Hazin Lahiji had done with Nader Shah previously. Shushtari continues by saying that if the "king of the Qizilbash" is successful in establishing order in Iran, "he will be superior to all the kings of the world," and his status will be as important as it was during the Kayanian era. The Kayanian era is portrayed as a golden period during which "all the kings [of the world] partook from the beneficence of their table, and [were] obedient tributaries" to Iran's ruler. In order to further explain what he means by "king of the Qizilbash," Shushtari says that a wise Russian once told him that whomever gained control of "the kingdom of Iran" was deserving of controlling the entire world. According to Mana Kia, "This is an articulation of cyclical Persianate millenarianism: restoration of proper rule in Iran, inaugurating a return to a pre-Islamic political past as a worldly ideal."

== Sources ==
- Dabashi, Hamid (2020). Reversing the Colonial Gaze: Persian Travelers Abroad. Cambridge University Press. ISBN 978-1108488129.
- Kia, Mana (2020). Persianate Selves: Memories of Place and Origin Before Nationalism. Stanford University Press. ISBN 978-1503611955.
