= Battle of Mir =

Battle of Mir may refer to:

- Battle of Mir (1792)
- Battle of Mir (1812)
