= Kotaha =

Village in Uttar Pradesh, India

Kotaha is a village in Prayagraj, Uttar Pradesh, India.
