= Revolutionary Left Movement =

Revolutionary Left Movement (Movimiento de (la) Izquierda Revolucionaria) may refer to:

- Revolutionary Left Movement (Bolivia)
- Revolutionary Left Movement (Chile)
- Revolutionary Left Movement (Peru)
- Revolutionary Left Movement (Venezuela)
