= Mir Ahmad (given name) =

Mir Ahmad or Mir Ahmed is a given name. Notable people with the name include:

- Mir Ahmad Bin Quasem, Bangladeshi barrister and activist
- Mir Ahmad Reza Hajati (born 1967), Iranian cleric
- Mir Ahmad Shah Rizwani (died 1978), Afghan military general and Islamist intellectual
- Mir Ahmed Bakhsh Lehri (born 1954), Pakistani civil servant
- Mir Ahmed Nasrallah Thattvi (died 1588), Muslim scholar of Pakistan
