= Mir Jafar (disambiguation) =

- Mir Jafar
- Mir Jafar Baghirov
- Mir Jafar Dasni
- Mir Jafar Khan Jamali
- Mir Jafar, Iran, village in Iran
