= Mirpur Jattan =

- Village
- Location in Punjab, India Mirpur Jattan (India)
- Coordinates: 31.0611804°N 76.2233323°E
- Country: India
- State: Punjab
- District: Shaheed Bhagat Singh Nagar

Government
  - Type: Panchayat raj
  - Body: Gram panchayat
- Elevation: 355 m (1,165 ft)

Population (2011)
  - Total: 2,383
- Sex ratio 1221/1162 ♂/♀

Languages
  - Official: Punjabi
- Time zone: UTC+5:30 (IST)
- PIN: 144515
- Telephone code: 01823
- ISO 3166 code: IN-PB
- Post office: Jadla (S.O)
- Website: nawanshahr.nic.in

Mirpur Jattan is a village in Shaheed Bhagat Singh Nagar district of Punjab State, India. It is located 3.3 kilometres (2.1 mi) away from sub post office Jadla, 15.3 kilometres (9.5 mi) from Nawanshahr, 22.3 kilometres (13.9 mi) from district headquarter Shaheed Bhagat Singh Nagar and 80.9 kilometres (50.3 mi) from state capital Chandigarh. The village is administrated by Sarpanch an elected representative of the village.

== Demography ==
As of 2011, Mirpur Jattan has a total number of 465 houses and population of 2383 of which 1221 include are males while 1162 are females according to the report published by Census India in 2011. The literacy rate of Mirpur Jattan is 77.97% lower than the state average of 75.84%. The population of children under the age of 6 years is 295 which is 12.38% of total population of Mirpur Jattan, and child sex ratio is approximately 1034 as compared to Punjab state average of 846.

Most of the people are from Schedule Caste which constitutes 45.20% of total population in Mirpur Jattan. The town does not have any Schedule Tribe population so far.

As per the report published by Census India in 2011, 796 people were engaged in work activities out of the total population of Mirpur Jattan which includes 651 males and 145 females. According to census survey report 2011, 82.29% workers describe their work as main work and 17.71% workers are involved in Marginal activity providing livelihood for less than 6 months.

== Education ==
The village has a Punjabi medium, co-ed upper primary with secondary school established in 1975. The school provide mid-day meal as per Indian Midday Meal Scheme. As per Right of Children to Free and Compulsory Education Act the school provide free education to children between the ages of 6 and 14. The village also has an KC Engineering College and Doaba Khalsa Trust Group Of Institutions are the nearest colleges. Industrial Training Institute for women (ITI Nawanshahr) is 12.7 kilometres (7.9 mi). The village is 62 kilometres (39 mi) away from Chandigarh University, 38 kilometres (24 mi) from Indian Institute of Technology and 58 kilometres (36 mi) away from Lovely Professional University.

List of schools nearby:

- Guru Nanak Model School, Mirpur Jattan
- Dashmesh Model School, Kahma
- Govt Primary School, Kahlon
- Govt High School, Garcha

== Homosexuality issue ==
In January 2006, The panchayat asked a female couple to leave the village after they suspected to be lesbians by the villagers. According to the then sarpanch Balihar Singh, the women's had married each other but both women's denied being in a lesbian relationship.

== Transport ==
Nawanshahr train station is the nearest train station, however, Garhshankar Junction railway station is 28.7 kilometres (17.8 mi) away from the village. Sahnewal Airport is the nearest domestic airport which located 60.7 kilometres (37.7 mi) away in Ludhiana and the nearest international airport is located in Chandigarh also Sri Guru Ram Dass Jee International Airport is the second nearest airport which is 167 kilometres (104 mi) away in Amritsar.

== See also ==
- List of villages in India
