= Mir Muhammed Ali Khan =

Muhammed Ali Khan was a prince and general of the Mughal Empire. Khan rescued the Grand Vizier Mir Mohib Ali Khalifa from enemy attacks at the Battle of Khanwa, which ended in Mughal victory over the Kingdom of Mewar.

== See also ==
- Mughal Empire
- Babur
