= Mir Hasan, Kermanshah =

Mir Hasan ميرحسن
- Village
- Location within Iran
- Coordinates: 33°52′47″N 47°03′26″E
- Country: Iran
- Province: Kermanshah
- County: Kermanshah
- Bakhsh: Firuzabad
- Rural District: Jalalvand

Population (2006)
  - Total: 143
- Time zone: UTC+3:30 (IRST)
  - Summer (DST): UTC+4:30 (IRDT)

Mir Hasan (Persian: ميرحسن, also Romanized as Mīr Ḩasan) is a village in Jalalvand Rural District, Firuzabad District, Kermanshah County, Kermanshah Province, Iran. At the 2006 census, its population was 143, in 30 families.
