= Mir Jumla =

Mir Jumla (Urdu: مير جملہ) may refer to:

- Mir Jumla I or Mir Muhammad Amin of Shahristan (died 1637 CE)
- Mir Jumla II or Mir Muhammad Saeed of Ardestan (died 1663 CE) (during the reign of Aurangzeb)
- Mir Jumla III or Ubaidullah, son of Mir Muhammad Wafa of Samarkand (died 1734 CE), aide of Farrukhsiyar
