= Mir (lens) =

The Mir (Russian: Мир) series of lenses are Russian camera lenses made by various manufacturers in the former Soviet Union.

== Mir-1 ==
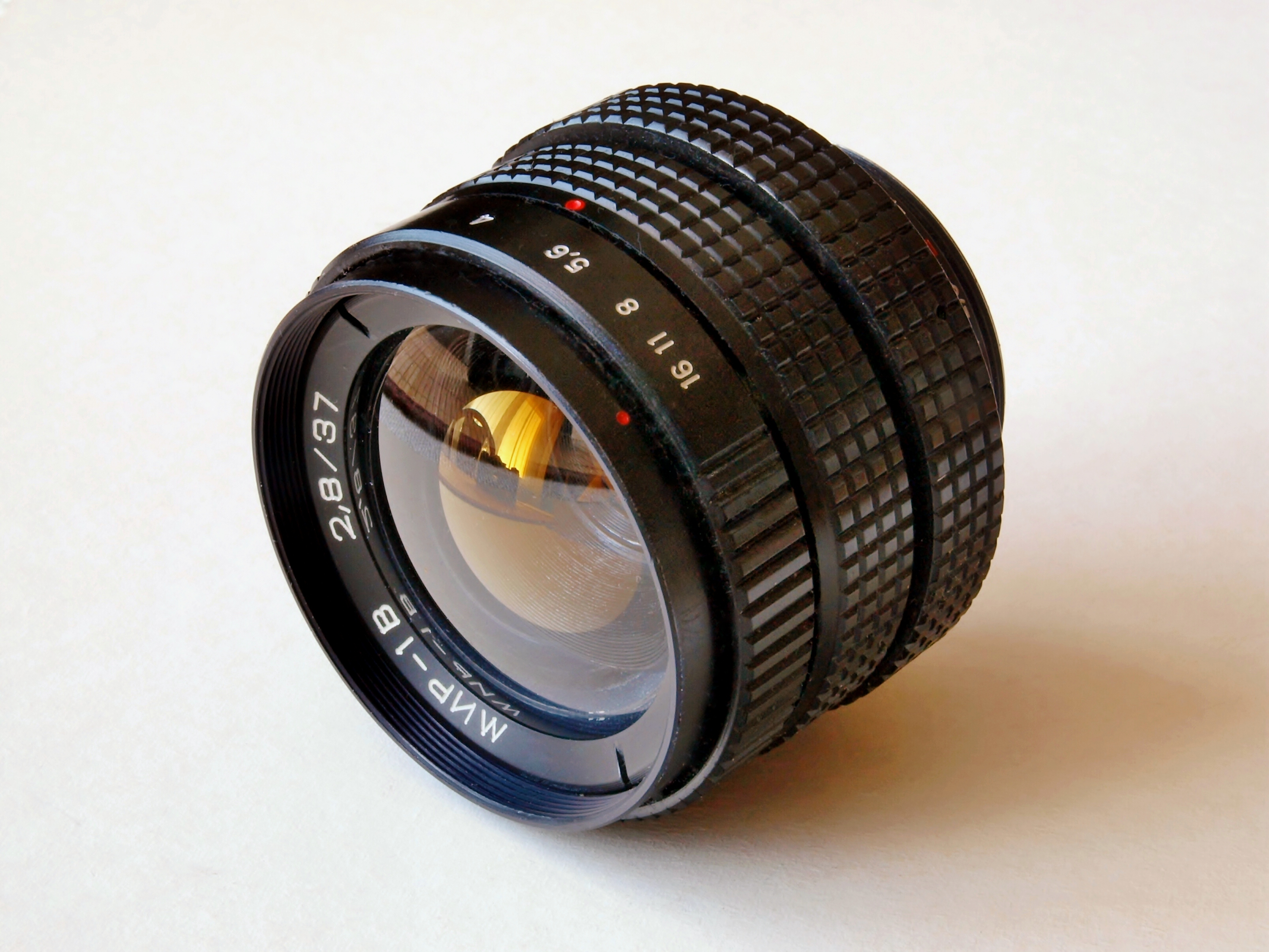
Мир-1В 2,8/37mm

The first variant was the Mir-1 and won the Grand Prix at Expo '58 in Brussels. Its construction was derived from the Flektogon lens by Harry Zöllner (Jena). The first element in this lens is in fact a disperser meniscus to reduce vignette effects when photographing with an open diaphragm.

Its focal length is 37.5mm and its maximum aperture is f/2.8. There are several versions of the lens (Mir-1, Mir-1V, (Note: The Cyrillic letter В in Мир-1В stands for Vologda, where the VOMZ factory is located, but people sometimes refer to the lens as Mir-1B using the latin alphabet letter B instead.) Mir-A..). Most of them are made for Zenit SLRs with M39 lens mount or M42 lens mount. The only different version is Mir-1A. Soviet lenses with A suffix have interchangeable lens mounts, so the user can choose which lens mount they want to use. This lens supports multiple mounts, including Nikon F mount.

The lens has six elements in four groups.

== Mir-3 ==
Mir-3 is a wide angle lens for Kiev medium format cameras (Kiev 6x and Kiev 8x families). It was produced in former Soviet Union from 1973 to 1984, when it was replaced by Mir-38.

The lens was available in two versions - Mir-3B has the Pentacon Six mount and is meant to be used with Kiev 6x medium format cameras when Mir-3V had the Hasselblad mount compatible with Kiev 8x family of cameras.

Its focal length is 65mm and its maximum aperture is f/3.5.

== Mir-4 ==
Very little is known about this lens. It's probably a prototype.

Its focal length is 29mm and its maximum aperture is f/3.5.

== Mir-5 ==
This is a very rare prototype lens. It was never commercially produced. It was meant to be used with Narcissus camera.

This lens has a focal length of 28mm and a maximum aperture of f/2.0.

== Mir-6 ==
This is a very rare prototype lens as well. It was never commercially produced. It was also meant to be used with Narcissus camera.

It has very similar specifications to Mir-5. It's also a 28mm lens, but it has smaller maximum aperture - f/2.8.

== Mir-10 ==
Mir-10 is a wide angle lens made for SLR cameras produced in the Soviet Union. It exists in 3 versions - Mir-10 (the experimental version), Mir-10M (the version with M42 lens mount), and Mir-10A - lenses with -A suffix have interchangeable mounts.

This lens has a focal length of 28mm and a maximum aperture of f/3.5.

== Mir-11 ==
Mir-11 is a wide-angle lens designed for 16 mm cinema cameras. There are two variants - Mir-11 with a Krasnogorsk bayonet mount, and the more common Mir-11M with an M32 mount, specifically made for the Kiev 16U.

It has a focal length of 12.5mm and a maximum aperture of f/2.0.

== Russian sources ==
- D.S. Volosov, «Photographic optics (theory, design basics, optical characteristics)», 2nd revised edition, Moscow, «Iskusstvo» Publishing House, 1978.
- (in Russian) Mir-1, Mir-5, Mir-6, Mir-10, Mir-20, Mir-24, Mir-46, Mir-47, Mir-51,

Mir-61
