= Kalateh-ye Mir Hasan =

Kalateh-ye Mir Hasan كلاته ميرحسن
- Village
- Location within Iran
- Coordinates: 35°32′34″N 59°36′43″E
- Country: Iran
- Province: Razavi Khorasan
- County: Fariman
- Bakhsh: Central
- Rural District: Balaband

Population (2006)
  - Total: 89
- Time zone: UTC+3:30 (IRST)
  - Summer (DST): UTC+4:30 (IRDT)

Kalateh-ye Mir Hasan (Persian: كلاته ميرحسن, also Romanized as Kalāteh-ye Mīr Ḩasan; also known as Mīr Ḩasan and Patū) is a village in Balaband Rural District, in the Central District of Fariman County, Razavi Khorasan Province, Iran. At the 2006 census, its population was 89, in 22 families.
