= Micropower impulse radar =

Micropower impulse radar is a low-power ultra wideband radar developed in the mid-1990s at Lawrence Livermore National Laboratory, used for sensing and measuring distances to objects in proximity to each other.

Commercial applications include:

- Vehicles: parking assistance, backup warnings, pre-collision detection and smart cruise control (measures the distance to the vehicles in front of you and if they get too close, throttle is released and brakes are applied).
- Appliances: studfinders and laser tape measures.
- Security: home intrusion motion sensors and perimeter surveillance.
- Search and rescue: micropower impulse radar can detect the beating of a human heart or respiration from long distances.
