= Meer =

Meer may refer to:

== People ==
- Fatima Meer (1928–2010), South African writer and anti-apartheid activist
- Ismail Chota Meer (1918–2000), South African writer and anti-apartheid activist
- Mark Meer (born 1971), Canadian actor and writer
- Moosa Ismail Meer (1897–1972), South African journalist
- Mir Taqi Mir (1722–1810), pen name Mir, Urdu poet

== Places ==
- Meer, Antwerp, Belgium
- Meer, Overijssel, Netherlands
- Meer, Beytüşşebap, Turkey

== Other uses ==
- Meer Campbell, fictional character from anime series Mobile Suit Gundam SEED
- Meer, a character in the Deverry Cycle

== See also ==
- Mir (disambiguation)
- Van der Meer, a Dutch surname
