= Magsi =

Magsi is a Baloch ethnic tribe, who inhabit Balochistan and Sindh. They speak Balochi in Balochistan, and both Balochi and Sindhi in Sindh.

Sobho Khan Magsi falls in Talka of Mehar District dadu in the province of Sindh.

Whereas,

Jhal Magsi is a district in Balochistan named after the Magsi tribe. The town is the headquarters of the Magsi and Lashari tribes, the major tribes within the district. Historically, the Magsis are a Baloch ethnicity who migrated from Iran with other Baloch tribes like Rind and Lashar. They are called Magsi due to the city in which they belonged, formerly knows as Magas (now Mehrestan) in Iran.

The current sardar of Magsi tribe is Nawab Zulfikar Ali Magsi, former chief minister of Balochistan.

== Notable people ==
- Abdullah Magsi, Pakistani author
- Khalid Hussain Magsi, Pakistani politician
- Maham Tariq, Pakistani cricketer
- Mir Aamir Ali Khan Magsi, Pakistani politician
- Mir Nadir Ali Khan Magsi, Pakistani Politician
- Nawabzada Saifullah Magsi, Pakistani politician
- Nawabzada Tariq Magsi, Pakistani politician
- Qadir Magsi (born 1962), Sindhi politician
- Rahila Magsi, Pakistani politician
- Sardar Qaisar Abbas Khan Magsi, Pakistani politician
- Shama Parveen Magsi (born 1950), Pakistani politician
- Yousaf Aziz Magsi (1908–1935), Baloch leader from the present-day Balochistan province of Pakistan
- Zulfikar Ali Magsi (born 1954), Pakistani politician, Governor of Balochistan, Pakistan
- Mahnoor Magsi (born 1998), Visual Artist
