= Zulfiqar Ali Khan Magsi =

Pakistani politician

Zulfikar Ali Magsi
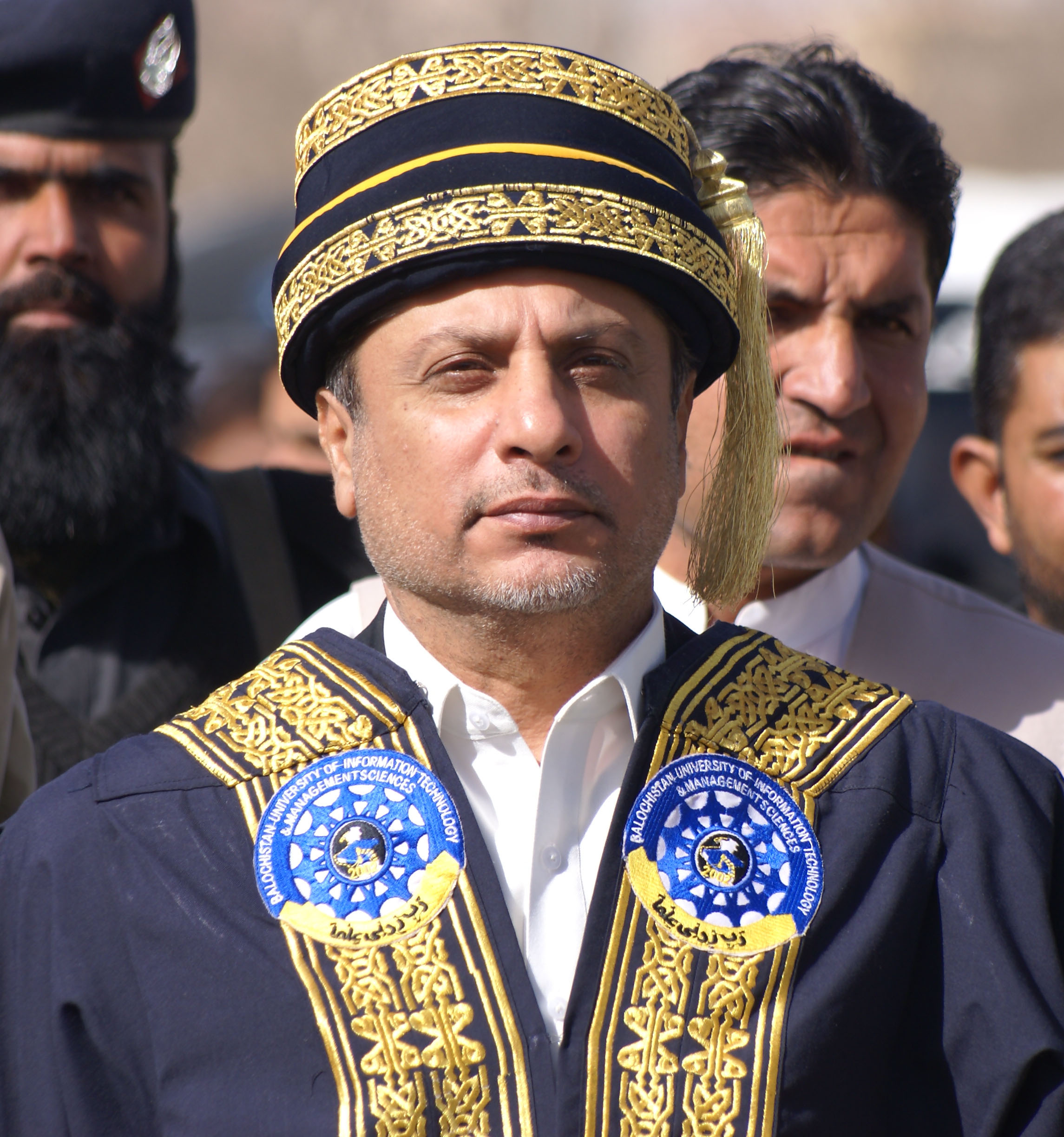

19th Governor of Balochistan
- In office 28 February 2008 – 9 June 2013
- President: Asif Ali Zardari
- Prime Minister: Yusuf Raza Gillani; Raja Pervaiz Ashraf; Nawaz Sharif
- Succeeded by: Muhammad Khan Achakzai

Chief Minister of Balochistan
- In office 20 October 1993 – 10 November 1996
- Prime Minister: Benazir Bhutto
- Governor: Imran Ullah Khan; Abdul Rahim Durrani
- Preceded by: Muhammad Naseer Mengal
- Succeeded by: Zafarullah Khan Jamali
- Caretaker
- In office 19 July 1993 – 30 May 1993
- Prime Minister: Nawaz Sharif; Moeenuddin Ahmad Qureshi
- Governor: Gul Mohammad Jogezai
- Preceded by: Taj Muhammad Jamali
- Succeeded by: Muhammad Naseer Mengal

Personal details
- Born: Zulfikar Ali Magsi; 14 February 1954 (age 72) Jhal Magsi District, Balochistan, Pakistan
- Citizenship: Pakistan
- Spouse: Shama Parveen Magsi
- Children: Nawabzada Saifullah Magsi
- Relatives: Mir Nadir Ali Khan Magsi (Brother) Nawabzada Tariq Magsi (Brother); Khalid Hussain Magsi (Brother) Mir Aamir Ali Khan Magsi (Brother)
- Education: Aitchison College; University of the Punjab
- Occupation: Politician
- Profession: Tumandar; politician
- Cabinet: Government of Balochistan
- Nickname: Nawab Sahib

Nawab Zulfiqar Ali Magsi (Urdu: نواب ذوالفقار علی مگسی; born 14 February 1954) was the 19th Governor of Balochistan since 28 February 2008 to 9 June 2013 as well as the Chief Executive of Balochistan since 14 January 2013. Magsi also served as Chief Minister of Balochistan in the Benazir Bhutto government of 1993–1996. He is the current Nawab and Tumandar of the Magsi Tribe.

Nawab was appointed as the chief executive of Balochistan on 13 January 2013 after the sacking of Aslam Raisani's unpopular government and imposition of Governor's Rule. It was the main after effect of the January 2013 Pakistan bombings. Nawab Magsi did his schooling from Aitchison College, Lahore. He first came to politics in 1977, when he won as an independent candidate seat from his native constituency in the provincial assembly. However, his family was involved in Balochistan politics before Pakistani independence. He served in many provincial ministries and also worked in the Home Ministry in the 1990s. In 1993, his coalition won majority of seats and he became Chief Minister of Balochistan.

In the February 2008 elections, he again stood as an independent candidate from his native PB-32 Jhal Magsi constituency and won without any opposition. On 27 February 2008, the caretaker Chief Minister Sardar Mohammad Saleh Bhootani announced officially that Nawab Magsi would be the next governor of Balochistan province. On 28 February 2008 Nawab Magsi took oath in the Governor House at Quetta. In the ceremony, he promised to resolve the ongoing military operation in Balochistan, missing political workers and bring peace in province. On Wednesday, 19 March 2008, Nawab Magsi asked Balochistan Government issue an outstanding bill against federal government and the Sindh Government of 128bn rupees.

== Political career ==
Nawab Magsi started his political career in 1977 when he participated in general elections as independent candidate and elected as Member Provincial Assembly. He also took part in the non-party elections of 1985 and returned successful as a Member, Provincial Assembly of Balochistan (MPA). He was re-elected as MPA in 1988 and again in 1990. He remained Provincial Minister Education and Planning and Development in 1988 while he served as Provincial Minister in Balochistan in 1990. He was twice elected as Chief Minister of Balochistan and remained in office from 30 May 1993 to 19 July 1993 and from 20 October 1993 to 10 November 1996 respectively.

In the general elections of 1997 he returned successful as MPA for the sixth time. He did not participate in 2002 elections. In the recent elections in 2008, he participated as independent candidate of Provincial Assembly and won his traditional seat. He was appointed by the president of Islamic Republic of Pakistan, as Governor of Balochistan on 28 February 2008 and on the same day, he took oath of his office. He resigned as Governor of Balochistan after prime minister-in-waiting Nawaz Sharif announced to bring the next governor from Muhammad Khan Achakzai's Pakhtunkhwa Milli Awami Party (PkMAP) which was accepted by the President on 9 June 2013.

== See also ==
- Yousaf Aziz Magsi
- Jam Nizamuddin II
- Shama Parveen Magsi
- Magsi

Political offices
Preceded by Taj Muhammad Jamali	Chief Minister of Balochistan; 1993–1996	Succeeded by Zafarullah Khan Jamali
Preceded by Amanullah Khan Yasinzai; Acting	Governor of Balochistan; 2008–2013	Succeeded by Muhammad Khan Achakzai
