= Raisani =

Brahui tribe in Pakistan

Raisani (Brahui: رئیسانی) is an ethnic Brahui tribe that resides in Balochistan province of Pakistan, belonging to the Sarawani branch of the Brahui tribes. They speak the Brahui language in Mastung and Bolan.

== History ==
Traditionally a Brahui tribe, much of the segment of the tribe have largely assimilated into the larger Baloch identity in recent times.

Alternatively, some anthropological texts mention the Raisanis as Pashtuns belonging to the Tor Tareen tribe.

== Prominent Figures ==
- Akbar Raisani: Former captain of the Pakistan national football team
- Ghous Bakhsh Raisani: Politician who served as the first Civilian governor of Balochistan from 26 December 1971 to 29 April 1972
- Aslam Raisani: Four times elected member of the Provincial Assembly of Balochistan who served as the Chief Minister of Balochistan from 9 April 2008 until 14 January 2013
- Siraj Raisani: Politician who had served as the chief of the political party called Balochistan Muttahida Mahaz (BMM) until June 2018
- Jamal Raisani: Youngest member of the National Assembly of Pakistan.

== Bibliography ==
- Elfenbein, Josef (1989). "Brahui". In Yarshater, Ehsan (ed.). Encyclopædia Iranica. Vol. IV/4: Bolbol I–Brick. London and New York: Routledge & Kegan Paul. pp. 433–443. ISBN 978-0-71009-127-7.
- Scholz, Fred (2002) [1974]. Nomadism & colonialism : a hundred years of Baluchistan, 1872-1972. Karachi; Oxford; New York: Oxford University Press. ISBN 978-0-19-579638-4.
