= Jamal Raisani =

Member of the National Assembly of Pakistan from Quetta (2024–2029)

- جمال رئیسانی

Member of the National Assembly of Pakistan
- Incumbent
- Assumed office 29 February 2024
- Constituency: NA-264 Quetta-III

Caretaker Provincial Minister of Balochistan for Sports and Culture
- In office 4 September 2023 – 15 December 2023
- Chief Minister: Ali Mardan Khan Domki

Personal details
- Party: PPP (2023-present)
- Relations: Ghous Bakhsh Raisani (grandfather); Aslam Raisani (uncle); Lashkari Raisani (uncle)
- Parent: Siraj Raisani (father)

Nawabzada Mir Jamal Khan Raisani (Urdu: نوابزادہ میر جمال خان رئیسانی) is a Pakistani politician who has been a Member of the National Assembly of Pakistan, in office since February 2024.

== Political career ==
He joined the Pakistan People's Party (PPP) in January 2023.

He became the Caretaker Provincial Minister of Balochistan for Sports and Culture in September 2023. He resigned on 15 December 2023 to contest the 2024 Pakistani general election.

Raisani won the 2024 Pakistani general election from NA-264 Quetta-III as a PPP candidate, and became youngest member of the National Assembly of Pakistan.
