= 2018 Mastung and Bannu bombings =

Terrorist attacks

- Part of War in North-West Pakistan
- Location of incidents shown in the map of Pakistan
- Location: 29.4087°N 67.1894°E; *Mastung, Balochistan: Bannu, Khyber Pakhtunkhwa
- Date: 13 July 2018
- Target: Nawabzada Siraj Raisani (Mastung); Akram Khan Durrani (Bannu)
- Attack type: Suicide bombing, IED
- Weapons: Explosive belt, IED
- Deaths: 154 total Mastung: 149; Bannu: 5
- Injuries: 223 total Mastung: 186; Bannu: 37
- Perpetrators: Mastung: Islamic State of Iraq and the Levant; Bannu: Ittehad-ul-Mujahideen
- Assailants: Mastung: Abu Bakar al-Pakistani (as per ISIL); Hafiz Nawaz (as per LEAs)
- No. of participants: Mastung: 1 suicide bomber
- Motive: Derailment of 2018 Pakistani general election

On 13 July 2018, ahead of Pakistan's general election, two bombings took place at election rallies in Bannu and Mastung.

In Bannu, a remotely exploded bomb planted in a motorcycle left 5 people dead and 37 others wounded in an unsuccessful attempt to assassinate former Khyber Pakhtunkhwa chief minister Akram Khan Durrani. Ittehad-ul-Mujahideen, an extremist organization, claimed responsibility for the attack.

In Mastung, a suicide bomber blew himself up during a rally for the Balochistan Awami Party's Siraj Raisani, the brother of former Balochistan chief minister Aslam Raisani. One of the deadliest terrorist attacks in Pakistani history, it killed 149 people and wounded 186 others. Siraj was taken to hospital in critical condition and died of injuries. The Islamic State of Iraq and the Levant (ISIL) claimed responsibility for the event and named the suicide bomber as Abu Bakar al-Pakistani, though authorities identified him as Hafeez Nawaz of Abbottabad.

== Background ==
=== Pre-election violence ===
The attacks came 12 days before the 2018 general elections in the country. In the beginning of the month, a bombing took place in Ramzak Tehsil of North Waziristan at the office of Malik Aurangjeb Khan, Pakistan Movement of Justice's candidate for NA-48 (Tribal Area-IX), leaving 10 people injured. A week before the current attack in Bannu, a bomb planted in a motorcycle was remotely exploded at an election campaign of Muttahida Majlis-e-Amal's PK–89 candidate Shein Malik in the Takhti Khel area of the city. Two days prior to the attacks, a suicide bombing at an election rally of the Awami National Party's leader Haroon Bilour in Peshawar left 20 people, including Bilour, dead and wounded 63 others. On 12 July, the Balochistan Awami Party (BAP)'s office in Khuzdar came under gunfire before a bomb detonated injuring 2 people.

=== ISIL in Pakistan ===
After the group's defeat in Iraq and Syria, many commanders of Islamic State of Iraq and the Levant (ISIL) fled to other countries where resistance was weak. Many fighters headed to Afghanistan where Al-Qaeda was fighting against the United States. Since ISIL's entry intervention in Pakistan, Balochistan has been a focus of its militancy. In 2016, ISIL claimed responsibility for two attacks in Quetta; one in August and the other in October. The following year, it perpetrated a suicide bombing at a shrine in Sehwan. In Mastung that year, the group carried out a suicide bombing to assassinate Deputy Chairman of the Senate of Pakistan Abdul Ghafoor Haideri.

== Prior intelligence ==
Soon after the Peshawar ambush, National Counter Terrorism Authority (NACTA) forwarded 12 threats to federal and provincial interior ministries, following which committee chairman Rahman Malik directed authorities to enhance security of politicians named by NACTA. In its report, NACTA named six politicians that can be targeted. The list included Durrani. The other five politicians included Pakistan Tehreek-e-Insaf (PTI)'s chairman Imran Khan, Awami National Party leaders Asfandyar Wali and Ameer Haider Khan Hoti, Qaumi Watan Party's head Aftab Sherpao and Hafiz Saeed's son Talha Saeed. It also suggested that members of PML-N and Pakistan Peoples Party (PPP) were under threat.

== Prime targets ==
=== Mastung ===
Siraj Raisani was a prominent member of the Balochistan Awami Party (BAP) and was to contest the next elections from PB-35. The brother of former Chief Minister of Balochistan Aslam Raisani, Siraj has served as chairman of Muttahida Mahaz Balochistan (MMB), founded by his father. He merged MMB into the BAP on 3 June 2018. Earlier, in July 2011, Raisani had survived an assassination attempt after grenades were thrown at him. In the ambush, his son Hakmal Raisani was killed.

=== Bannu ===
Akram Khan Durrani has served as chief minister of KPK from 2002 to 2007 and is contesting 2018 elections from NA-35 (Bannu) against Chairman of Pakistan Movement of Justice Imran Khan. Leader of Muttahida Majlis-e-Amal, Durrani was appointed as Minister for Housing & Works by the President of Pakistan Mamnoon Hussain on the advice of Prime Minister Nawaz Sharif on 29 August 2013. The current attack follows two previous unsuccessful attempts to assassinate him, one in 2015 and another in 2007.

== Attacks ==
=== Mastung ===
Siraj Raisani was about to address an election rally when a suicide bomber, carrying around 16–20 kg of explosive material in his vest, blew himself up among a crowd of more than 1000 people. Along with Raisani, the explosion killed 128 people. Two days after the attack, on 15 July 2018, the number of dead increased to 149, while 186 other people were injured, making it the deadliest terrorist attack in Pakistan since the APS massacre in Peshawar in 2014.

=== Bannu ===
Former KPK chief minister and Jamiat Ulema-e Islam (F) leader, Akram Khan Durrani was coming from an election rally. Due to death threats to Durrani, his security was increased and 40 policemen were deployed in his convoy. When the convoy came near Haved Bazaar, an IED, planted in a motorcycle, exploded near the tire of his vehicle. Durrani remained unhurt. Having taken place 40 meters away from JUI (F)'s rally site, the explosion left 5 people dead and wounded 37 others. There were conflicting views about the nature of the detonation. An eyewitness reported having watched a motorcycle rider blowing himself up, while officials said that the bomb was planted in a motorcycle. RPO Bannu called it a remotely exploded bomb.

== Aftermath ==
=== Rescue services ===
Before arrival of rescue teams, people took the injured to hospital via cabs. The ambulances brought survivors to Quetta Civil hospital where a state of emergency was imposed by provincial government. 73 bodies were first transported to the hospital. Later Shamim Akhtar, a hospital official, stated that they were treating 110 victims brought to them. Secretary of Sindh Blood Transfusion Authority (SBTA) Zahid Ansari asked blood banks to provide 1000 blood bags for the victims of the Mastung blast. Ansari was approached by Balochistan Health Department, and urged citizens of Karachi to donate blood, following which mobile messages asking for blood donation started circulating in Karachi. On 14 July 2018, Quetta civil hospital overflowed due to the excess of patients. Beds in the hospital fell short of need and many patients were treated in the corridor of hospital.

=== Investigations and security measures ===
On the next day of attacks, a First Information Report (FIR) was registered against the Bannu bombing at the Haved police station. The FIR included charges of terrorism. Caretaker Chief Minister of KPK, Dost Muhammad Khan, formed a seven-member Joint Investigation Team (JIT) to probe the Bannu bombing and apprehend the assailants. 86 teams of Frontier Constabulary containing 3338 security personnel were positioned across the province and another 500 officers from Azad Kashmir were summoned to be deployed in the region.

Earlier, the Election Commission of Pakistan (ECP) sought a briefing from NACTA over the Bannu bombing and also sought a report from the caretaker CM, IG and chief secretary of KPK over inadequate security of politicians. After Mastung incident, ECP ordered NACTA's coordinator to appear before it on the following day. ECP declared 17,000 polling stations across the country as sensitive. These included 5,487 from Punjab, 5,878 from Sindh, 3,874 in KPK and 1,768 in Balochistan.

== Arrests ==
On next day of attack, security forces detained two suspects. According to security forces, the suicide bomber, who blew himself up in Mastung, came from Afghanistan two days prior to the attack and stayed in Chaghi. The apprehended duo is suspected to have sheltered the assailant inside their residence. On 19 July, IG Balochistan Mohsin Hassan Butt said the suicide bomber named Hafiz Nawaz was resident of Abbottabad. Nawaz had traveled from Abbottabad to Sindh and therein affiliated with Lashkar-e-Jhangvi (LeJ). According to Butt, efforts were underway to arrest Mufti Haider, a facilitator of Nawaz.

== Media coverage ==
On the day of attacks, former Pakistani Prime minister Nawaz Sharif and his daughter Maryam Nawaz arrived in Lahore from Abu Dhabi. The duo's arrival was more in the crosshairs of the Pakistani media, hence it was covered in more detail than the bombings. Initially only a few news channels gave it short coverage but later when the death toll exceeded 100, media started covering it broadly. Many people took to Twitter and criticized the media for sidelining coverage of the bombings. Geo News's journalist Hamid Mir said if these attacks were carried out in Punjab, they would have received much more media coverage.

== Responsibility ==
Islamic State of Iraq and the Levant (ISIL) claimed responsibility for the Mastung bombing. Two days later, ISIL released picture of the suicide bomber and identified him as Abu Bakar al-Pakistani. In a series of statements released on its official news agency Amaq, the organization, referring to Raisani, stated that deceased included one of the Pakistani intelligence officers who was contesting elections. A group called Ittehad-ul-Mujahideen claimed responsibility for the Bannu incident.

== Domestic reactions ==
=== Government ===
Caretaker Prime minister of Pakistan Nasirul Mulk condemned the attack and directed the interior ministry to issue a notification declaring Sunday, a day of mourning. Accompanied by Chairman senate Sadiq Sanjrani and caretaker Chief Minister of Balochistan Alauddin Marri, Mulk arrived in Quetta two days after the bombing and condoled the victims in hospital. He also met with Raisani's family and expressed his grief. Interim chief minister of Punjab, Hassan Askari condemned the attack and said that no religion asks for violence against innocent people and that the entire nation was united against terrorism. Marri expressed his grief over loss of lives. Denouncing the massacre, he called it "a conspiracy to derail elections". He also vowed to beat terror by education. The acting government of Balochistan announced two days of mourning in the province. The national flag was raised at half-mast throughout the province. The caretaker chief minister of Sindh Fazalur Rehman condemned the attack and expressed sorrow over loss of lives. Interim chief minister of KPK Dost Muhammad Khan prayed for injures and expressed sympathies for bereaved families. Denouncing the bombings, he vowed that perpetrators'd be dealt with iron hand. KPK Governor Iqbal Zafar Jhagra denounced both the attacks and prayed for the victims. On 16 July, the senate passed a unanimous resolution condemning the Mastung bombing and expressed grief over loss of lives.

=== Politicians ===
Chairman of Pakistan Peoples Party Bilawal Zardari denounced the attacks. He also said that these assaults shouldn't delay elections. Former President Asif Ali Zardari condemned both attacks and expressed his "profound grief" over loss of lives. Chairman of Pakistan Tehreek-e-Insaf Imran Khan visited Quetta to express his grief. He criticized authorities for lack of implementation of National Action Plan. In a tweet he said he wondered why terrorism rises in the country whenever Nawaz Sharif is in trouble. President of Pakistan Muslim League (N) Shehbaz Sharif visited Quetta hospital and expressed his solidarity with victims' families. In one of his statements, he said that India was involved in Mastung suicide blast. Leader of Qaumi Watan Party Aftab Sherpao condemned the attacks and extended his sympathies with victims and asked the government for proper security.

== International reactions ==
=== Supranational ===
- European Union – The EU condemned the attacks and asked for justice to be provided to victims.
- (Organisation of Islamic Cooperation) Organization of Islamic Cooperation – Secretary-General Yousef Al-Othaimeen denounced the attacks and offered condolences to people of Pakistan.
- United Nations – Security Council and Secretary-General António Guterres condemned bombings and condoled the victims.

=== States ===
- Afghanistan – President Ashraf Ghani made a phone call with Pakistan's army chief Qamar Javed Bajwa and expressed grief over tragedy. He also assured enhanced border security on Afghan side.
- Albania – Foreign Minister Ditmir Bushati prayed for the families of victims.
- Australia – Australian High Commissioner to Pakistan Margaret Adamson denounced both attacks and saying she was grieved over loss of lives.
- China – Deputy Chief of Mission Chinese Embassy in Pakistan Lijian Zhao condemned the attack and ensured Chinese solidarity with Pakistan in its war against militancy.
- Egypt – External affairs ministry condemned attacks and stressed Egyptian people's support for Pakistan.
- Germany – The German Ambassador to Pakistan Martin Kobler tweeted, "Profoundly shocked and deeply saddened about the news of the Mastung". It continued "My thoughts are with the families who lost their beloved ones! What a tragedy! Terror must not prevail." Chancellor Angela Merkel condemned the attacks and assured German support for Pakistan. Manfred Weber denounced bombings in a tweet and conveyed his condolences to the victims.
- India – Ministry of External Affairs condemned both attacks and expressed condolences with bereaved families. Leaders of All Parties Hurriyat Conference Mirwaiz Umar Farooq and Syed Ali Shah Geelani also condemned attacks.
- Iran – Spokesperson of foreign ministry Bahram Qaseemi denounced the attacks and offered his condolences to victims.
- Japan – External affairs minister Tarō Kōno expressed his condolences to victims and prayed for quick recovery of injures.
- Mexico – External affairs ministry expressed condolences and solidarity with people of Pakistan and condemned violence.
- Qatar – Ministry of Foreign Affairs denounced the assaults and conveyed their condolences to government of Pakistan.
- Saudi Arabia – The Ministry of External Affairs condemned the attacks and ensured Saudi support for Pakistan against militancy.
- Turkey – Presidential spokesperson condemned the attacks terming it attack on Pakistan's democracy and assured its solidarity with people of Pakistan.
- Ukraine – Foreign minister Pavlo Klimkin condemned the attack. In a tweet, he expressed his support for victims.
- United Arab Emirates – Foreign Ministry condemned the attacks and reaffirmed UAE's solidarity with Pakistan.
- United Kingdom – British diplomat Thomas Drew condemned in a tweet saying "A terrible day. We join our Pakistani friends in our thoughts for the victims of these cowardly attacks and in condemning their perpetrators. No one can be allowed to thwart the country's democratic process."
- United States – Department of State's spokesperson Heather Nauert said in a statement "The United States strongly condemns this week's attacks on political candidates and their supporters in Balochistan and Khyber Pakhtunkhwa provinces of Pakistan. These attacks are cowardly attempts to deprive the Pakistani people of their democratic rights."

== Notable victims ==
- Siraj Raisani, politician from Balochistan

== See also ==
- List of terrorist incidents linked to Islamic State – Khorasan Province
- 2014 Peshawar school massacre, similar deadliest attack in Pakistan
- 2018 Peshawar suicide bombing, a suicide bombing three days prior to attack
- 2023 Mastung bombing
- Terrorist incidents in Pakistan in 2018
