= Shafiq Mengal =

Pakistani Baloch politician, former militia commander, and ex-drug smuggler

Mir Shafiq-ur-Rehman Mengal
- میر شفیق الرحمن مینگل
- Born: Wadh, Khuzdar District, Balochistan, Pakistan
- Citizenship: Pakistani
- Known for: Forming and leading anti-separatist Pakistani-Baloch militias
- Political party: Independent
- Father: Naseer Mengal
- Military career
- Allegiance: Pakistan
- Commands: Baloch Musallah Difa Tanzeem; Tehreek-e-Nafaz-e-Aman Balochistan (TNAB)
- Conflicts: Insurgency in Balochistan

Mir Shafiq-ur-Rahman Mengal (Balochi: میر شفیق الرحمن مینگل Urdu: میر شفیق الرحمان مینگل), more commonly known as Shafiq Mengal or Shafique Mengal (Balochi: شفیق مینگل Urdu: شفیق مینگل), is a Pakistani Baloch tribal leader, politician, and prominent pro-state figure from the Khuzdar district of Balochistan, Pakistan. He is known for his pro-Pakistan and anti-separatist views. He is also the son of former federal minister and former caretaker Chief Minister of Balochistan, Naseer Mengal. He entered mainstream politics in March 2026 by joining the Pakistan People's Party (PPP). Shafiq Mengal also heads the Jhalawan Awami Panel organization.

== Early life ==
Shafiq Mengal belongs to the Mohamadzai clan of the Mengal tribe, which belongs to the town Wadh in the Khuzdar district of Balochistan, Pakistan. His father, Naseer Mengal, was the former acting Chief Minister of Balochistan and also a senator during the military regime of General Zia-ul Haq, and later as the Pakistani ambassador to Qatar, before becoming the head of the federal Ministry of Petroleum and Natural Resources of Pakistan. Early on in his life, Shafiq and his family lived in an average-income household in the housing colony of Wadpa in Wahd.

=== Education ===
After dropping out of Aitchison College, Shafiq enrolled in a high-level boarding school in Lahore and later also joined a Deobandi madrasa (a type of religious Islamic seminary), commonly associated with Jamia Binoria, in the Binoria town of Karachi. While in the seminary in Karachi, Shafiq met senior members of Islamist political groups, such as Lashkar-e-Taiba. These contacts had reportedly inspired him to take part in the "Islamic Holy War" (jihad) in Indian-occupied Kashmir. From 1999 to 2001, Mengal also attended the Shaikh Zayed Islamic Centre. According to one analyst, Mengal had always prioritized his madrasa education.

=== Alleged involvement in drug smuggling ===
Shafiq Mengal, along with his elder brother Atta-ur-Rehman, and their uncle Qudoos Mengal, had resorted to trafficking drugs and narcotics in unregistered vehicles as an alternative source of extra income. According to the Jamestown foundation, this led to Shafiq establishing connections with powerful Baloch smugglers and anti-state militants in the region early on in his life. During his time in Karachi, Shafiq also became associated with the Baloch smugglers and the extortion mafia active there. The city of Hyderabad in Pakistan's Sindh Province was considered the hub of Shafiq's trafficking activities.

In Pakistan, militants and smugglers tend to have close ties with one-another, especially in key trading and logistics hubs such as the city of Karachi and the province of Balochistan. They often co-exist and cooperate with each other during times of need. Shafiq, already involved in such activities, eventually followed the path from away from being a smuggler towards being a pro-state militant.

== Involvement in anti-separatist violence ==
Shafiq, with his involvement in illegal trafficking activities along with his inspiration from jihadists, eventually followed the path from being a low-level smuggler, to becoming a prominent pro-state militiaman. His career as a militant began when he was inspired by his associates at his seminary in Karachi to take part in "holy war". When Chief of Army Staff General Pervez Musharraf seized power from Prime Minister Nawaz Sharif in a bloodless coup in October 1999 in the aftermath of the Kargil war, federal intelligence agencies chose Shafiq and his brother (Atta-ur-Rehman) as apparent state security actors and assets in order to maintain stability restore public law and order. in Balochistan This meant he and his brother had ended up becoming pro-state militiamen who had been recruited to fight against Baloch separatists. In 2005, Shafiq Mengal was injured in clashes between rival clans of the Mengal Baloch tribe.

=== Leadership of armed groups ===
==== Baloch Musallah Difaee Tanzeem ====
In around 2008, Mengal founded the Baloch Musalla Difa Tanzeem (translated as the Armed Baloch Defence Organization and acronymed as BMDT or ABDO), an armed pro-Pakistan and anti-separatist vigilante group and tribal militia based primarily in the Khuzdar district of Pakistani province of Balochistan, which was formed in order to counter the increasing attacks from armed Baloch separatists. Founded at the height of the Baloch insurgency, the main stated purpose of the group was to defend and protect pro-Pakistani locals and communities in the Mengal-dominated areas of central Balochistan (such as Khuzdar, Wadh, and Awaran) from militant attacks and counter Baloch separatist groups, such as the Balochistan Liberation Army and Balochistan Liberation Front. In 2008–2009, while majority of anti-insurgent armed groups were being disarmed by the authorities in order for security responsibilities to be taken over by police and paramilitary forces, an exception had been made for Shafique Mengal and his Baloch Musallah Difa Tanzeem in Khuzdar. The BMDT/ABDO was officially banned by Pakistani authorities on 8 September 2010. Despite the official government ban, the militia's networks and fighters had remained relatively active under various local tribal alignments and fronts, including the political umbrella of Shafiq Mengal's Jhalawan Awami Panel.

==== Tehreek-e-Nafaz-e-Aman Balochistan ====
Shafiq later founded another armed group in 2012 known as Tehreek-e-Nafaz-e-Aman Balochistan (translated as the Movement for the Restoration of Peace in Balochistan and acronymed as TNAB or MRPB), an armed pro-government militia which operated in the Balochistan province of Pakistan, particularly centered around the Khuzdar region. The group positioned itself as a peace restoration and pro-Pakistan organization opposing local separatist movements and sentiments. It was later also banned on 4 August 2012 as well.

=== Criticisms and allegations against Mengal ===
==== Human rights abuses ====
Baloch nationalist parties and both local and international human rights organizations had repeatedly accused Mengal of running state-sponsored "death squads". His groups and organizations had been accused of involvement in enforced disappearances, torture, and target killings of Baloch nationalists, dissidents, and pro-independence activists and students. He strongly denied the allegations and called the "baseless propaganda" by Indian-backed terrorists in Balochistan, stating that the purpose of his armed groups was to protect pro-Pakistani Baloch communities, and said in an interview that the term "Death Squad" was a derogatory label by separatist groups, such as the Balochistan Liberation Army and Balochistan Liberation Front, who he said were actually behind such actions, in order to defame and de-legitimize the tribal resistance against the separatist insurgency. He went on to argue that the concept of a "death squad" had originated in Latin America during Cold War and had nothing to do with Balochistan. He said that "we are the sons of the soil" and that Pakistan is the result of their grandfathers' fight and struggle against British rule. He further stated that there weren't any death squads and such claims were made extremist groups to cover up and divert attention away from their own violent actions and crimes.

==== Mass graves connection ====
Mengal's name had surfaced in high-profile investigations, including the 2014 discovery of mass graves of mutilated bodies in the Tutak area of Khuzdar, whose discovery had sent shock waves across the country. The Quetta High Court subsequently set up a tribunal to investigate the matter and several witnesses pointed to Shafiq Mengal’s involvement in the matter. One eyewitness testified that their brother, whose body was recovered from the Tutak graves, had been forcefully abducted by Mengal. Mengal first appeared in Tootak in November, 2009, when he lured a few activists of the separatist Baloch Student Organization to the area with the promise that he would organise the broadcast of nationalist songs there to create awareness about separatism among the local people. All of that was an apparent decoy to spy on, abduct, and kill separatist activists, according to Balochistan provincial government officials, who were involved in the investigation. In August 2014, the Judicial commission tasked with investigating the incident, headed by Noor Miskanzai of the Balochistan High Court, after collecting statements from 38 witnesses (many of whom were determined to be relatives of the victims after DNA tests), found that neither the federal nor provincial government, and neither the Army, police, nor paramilitary forces were behind the incident, with eyewitness testimonies pointing instead towards Shafiq Mengal having a potential role. Mengal has consistently denied any involvement in the incident, claiming that the charges were politically motivated. Mengal said in a 2026 interview the area of Tutak where the bodies were discovered was once a stronghold of insurgent organizations and that he himself lost family members to insurgent violence. He added that his own brother was killed by militant groups, adding that "standing with Pakistan has a cost, and we are paying it". He maintained that judicial inquiries had cleared him of involvement in the mass graves incident.

==== Links to extremists ====
Media reports have frequently alleged that Mengal is affiliated and maintains ties with far-right extremist groups, such as Sipah-e-Sahaba Pakistan, Lashkar-e-Jhangvi, and Lashkar-e-Taiba. Some Indian media reports went as far as to claim that Mengal was the official Balochistan coordinator and commander of the Islamic State – Khorasan Province (ISKP), adding that Mengal was one of the key figures behind an alleged ISI-facilitated nexus between Lashkar-e-Taiba and ISKP in Balochistan in order to undermine the Taliban's authority in Afghanistan (despite LeT's alliance with the Taliban), weaken Baloch separatists, and to revive the Kashmir insurgency. This stemmed primarily from the fact that Mengal had gifted a pistol to Rana Mohammad Ashfaq, the alleged Nazim-e-Ala of the LeT. Mengal strongly and consistently denied any close involvement or affiliation with such groups.

==== Murder charges ====
On 27 July 2014, the Balochistan government registered a case against Shafiq Mengal in connection with the murder of eight Baloch Levies personnel in Balochistan’s Khuzdar district the previous week, an official said. According to an officer from the Balochistan’s Home and Tribal Affairs department, an FIR was registered at Wadh Police Station under the Pakistan Protection Ordinance against Mengal in relation to the murder of the eight levy personnel. The incident had taken place at the Johar checkpost on the Quetta-Karachi National Highway. Mengal denied any involvement in the attack and was never apprehended for it.

==== Terrorism charges ====
On 21 July 2023, a day after clashes between rival Mengal clans, Federal Minister Agha Hassan Baloch, a leader of BNP-M, held an emergency news conference at the National Press Club, requesting the government, the Armed Forces, and the media to play a positive role in resolving the situation. Baloch said several terrorism cases were registered against Shafiq Mengal, but he had not been caught yet, while the complainant was beaten, threatened and, coerced. He said Shafiq Mengal had been launched "to create terror in Balochistan".

Mengal's name came up in an investigation in January 2015, in the aftermath of a militant attack on an Imambargah in Shikarpur, Sindh. The tribunal investigating the attack looked into his role in providing safe passage to the militants who carried out the attack. Mengal denied any involvement in participating in or facilitating the attack.

==== Involvement in tribal inter-clan violence ====
On 18 October 2005, during inter-clan violence in the Mengal tribe, Shafiq-ur-Rehman Mengal along with Sardar Ataullah Mengal’s grandson Asadullah Mengal, were injured in clashes which killer 1 unidentified pedestrian was killed and five tribesmen received injuries. A rocket hit the residence of Sardar Ataullah Mengal which injured his grandson Mir Asadullah Mengal. According to sources, tribal elders, including district the Nazim of Khuzdar, Sardar Naseer Ahmed Moosiani, and the younger brother of Sardar Sanaullah Zehri, Mir Zafarullah Zehri, were also in Ataullah Mengal's house when rocket hit the house. According to reports, armed men of the two clans of the Mengal tribe, Shahaizai clan and Mohammadzai clan, took positions against each other and started firing on each other at approximately 11:00 AM (PST). The exchange of fire continued till late evening which included the usage of automatic weapons as well as rockets. All 5 of the injured were taken to the civil hospital in Khuzdar.

On 20 July 2023, at around 6:00 pm (PST) clashes had occurred between armed men loyal to BNP-Mengal President Akhtar Mengal and Shafiq Mengal. The clashes, as well as protests by BNP-Mengal supporters and party workers, brought all traffic between Quetta and Karachi to a halt. The protests by BNP-Mengal members had also resulted in roadblocks in Quetta, Kalat, Mastung, Khuzdar, Bela, Hub, and other towns throughout Balochistan. Nawab Aslam Raisani, chief of Sarawan tribes, reportedly established contact with both Akhtar Mengal, Sharif Mengal, and other tribal elders, requesting to both sides to show restraint, adding the both sides should resolve the conflicts between through reconciliation, per tribal customs. According to the Balochistan Home Minister, Mir Ziaullah Langove, stated that the clashes continued for 2 hours, adding that "rockets and heavy weapons" were used in the clashes. According to him, the shooting conceded after the local Khuzdar administration had held negotiations with the elders of both groups. He added that security forces has also been deployed to Wadh in order to prevent further clashes. According to reports, markets and other areas in Wadh town were completely closed and people were stuck in their houses. The rival groups had agreed to a temporary overnight ceasefire until the next morning, after negotiations with Kalat Division Commissioner Dawood Khilji, Khuzdar Deputy Commissioner (and Retired Captain) Jamil Baloch, and multiple senior police officials. Though firing had stopped, the situation had continued to remain very tense as gunmen from both sides continued to maintain their presence in their trenches, despite efforts to establish a permanent ceasefire.

The next day, after clashes between rival Mengal clans restarted following the collapse of the overnight ceasefire, Aslam Raisani, again offered to mediate between the factions and spoke to Akhtar Mengal and Shafiq Mengal, the leaders of the two warring Mengal factions, in order to resolve the issues between them through peaceful dialogue.

On 21 July 2026, Sardar Akhtar Mengal met with Prime Minister Shehbaz Sharif to raise the issue of inter-clan violence which had led to 4 people getting injured and for the PM to also intervene, which was also raised in the National Assembly of Pakistan as an issue. Akhtar Mengal alleged that armed groups were being supported by specific institutions and had been given free rein to run around ravaging in Balochistan for several years by then. He recalled the discovery of mass graves in the Totak area of Khuzdar, saying that the same elements which were involved in that incident are currently involved in the violence in Wadh, which pointed indirectly to Shafiq Mengal. He also claimed that these armed groups wanted to eliminate Baloch nationalists and political parties (both which Shafiq's groups had been accused of targetting), which were struggling for establishing proper democracy in Balochistan. He accused the government of Pakistan of being a silent spectator while truckers and landowners in the province were being severely affected by kidnapping, extortion, and among other threats. Later, speaking in the National Assembly, independent lawmakers Aslam Bootani and Mohsin Dawar criticized the authorities for failing to maintain law and order in Balochistan. Dawar said said that death squads (a term often associated with armed groups loyal to Shafqi) were operating in Khuzdar and the parliament as well as the government should play a role in restoring peace there.

When addressing his long-standing political rivalry with prominent Baloch politician, Akhtar Mengal, Shafiq Mengal described the feud between them as ideological one rather than tribal one. He alleged that certain Baloch politicians, chieftains, and leaders were historically aligned with foreign powers, initially with the Soviet Union in the past and later on with India. Per Mengal, the problem in Balochistan is not political dissent but what he called the "hijacking of nationalism by foreign-funded militancy". He accused mainstream political parties of double standards condemning insurgents when they're in the government and accommodating them when they're in the opposition.

== Political involvement and career ==
=== Early political career ===
In the mid-2000s, Shafiq Mengal had served as the Nizem of Khuzdar's Wadh Tehsil.

Mengal first properly ran for election in 2018. The Election Commission of Pakistan (ECP) found him fit to stand for election for the Khuzdar district seat of the National Assembly of Pakistan, which he was ultimately unable to take from the previous holder, Sardar Akhtar Mengal.

=== Entry in mainstream politics ===
In March 2026, Shafiq Mengal met with President Asif Ali Zardari and joined the Pakistan People's Party. Following his induction, he was granted a party ticket to contest the NA-256 Khuzdar by-election, a seat left vacant after the resignation of Baloch nationalist leader Akhtar Mengal.

==== Criticism against involvement ====
Mengal'sentry into the PPP drew criticism from commentators, media reports, journalists, and nationalist politicians who viewed it as a counterproductive move which tried to polish up the image of a controversial figure who has been linked to regional violence.

== Assassination attempts ==
Because of his anti-separatist stance, Mengal has often been a primary target of Baloch insurgent groups. He previously survived a massive suicide bombing in 2013 by the Balochistan Liberation Army which targeted his convoy, which killed over 20 of his men. Mengal's own brother, Atta-ur-Rehman Mengal, was killed in a separate BLA attack on 23 June 2025, where he died of wounds along with 5 of his bodyguards while Shafiq's nephew Atta's son, Muti-ur-Rehman Mengal, was left seriously injured when gunmen attacked his guesthouse in Khuzdar’s Aranji area late at night.

=== July 2026 Attack ===
On 8 July 2026, in a major coordinated assault (as part of a larger series of coordinated attacks across Balochistan), the Balochistan Liberation Army (BLA) targeted Mengal's residence in Khuzdar using kamikaze car bombs and storming tactics. According to local sources, a suicide bomber rammed into the main gate of his residence near Shahzad Town in Khuzdar city using an explosive-laden vehicle in order to breach the compound's perimeter, which had destroyed the gate, along with the nearby boundary wall, as well as a large portion of the overall building which Mengal was in. After the explosion, a large shootout between the attackers and security personnel erupted and had continued for more 3 hours. Reports state that a total of 12 militants participated in the assault, with 7 attempting to breach the compound while the remaining were laying down cover fire support for the storming militants. According to the police, security forces had reached the site soon after the attack and had largely cordoned off the area. The clashes involved the usage of small arms, RPGs, grenades, among other munitions, which eyewitnesses were used by both sides. Mengal's security detail along with local law enforcement had managed repelled the assault. Reinforcements from the Quick Response Force had later arrived and eliminated the remaining five attackers positioned outside the compound.

BLA later claimed responsibility for the attack. It codenamed the attack as "Operation Murg-e-Ghadaran" claiming that the attack was done by its Majeed Brigade, based on information gathered by ZIRAB, its intelligence wing.

==== Aftermath of the attack ====
Nadeem-ur-Rehman, the spokesperson and general secretary of Shafiq Mengal's Jhalawan Awami Panel, confirmed the that an attack had occurred on Mengal’s residence, adding that Mengal remained unharmed during the attack and is now currently safe. According to an unnamed official, 17 people were killed and 30 were injured during the attack, including Mengal's own bodyguards and members of local law enforcement. He also said that 5 of the attackers along with 2 suicide bombers, were additionally killed during the shootout.

Rescue teams shifted the injured to Khuzdar Teaching Hospital and local Combined Military Hospital (CMH), where an emergency was declared in the aftermath of the attack.After the first explosion, multiple others were across Khuzdar city, which damaged the doors and windows of multiple nearby buildings. According to officials, security force launched a search operation in pursuit of the perpetrators in both local and nearby areas, while security in Khuzdar city was tightened with additional deployment of security personnel.

Nearly a month after the attack on 16 August, security forces stated to have killed 10 BLA militants in the Shor Parod area of Khuzdar district.
