= NA-264 Quetta-III =

Constituency of the National Assembly of Pakistan

- Constituency for the National Assembly of Pakistan
- Region: Kechi Baig, Shabooo, Shadainzai and Quetta City (partly) of Quetta District
- Electorate: 187,539

Current constituency
- Created: 2018
- Party: Pakistan People's Party
- Member: Jamal Raisani

NA-264 Quetta-III (این اے-264، کوئٹہ-3) is a constituency, created in 2018, for the National Assembly of Pakistan. It mainly comprises the areas of the Quetta City Tehsil as well as census charges 13 and 14 of Quetta city.

== Assembly Segments ==
| Constituency number | Constituency | District | Current MPA | Party |
|---|---|---|---|---|
| 41 | PB-41 Quetta-IV | Quetta District | Wali Muhammad Noorzai | PML(N) |
| 42 | PB-42 Quetta-V | Quetta District | Sheikh Zarak Khan Mandokhail | PML(N) |
| 46 | PB-46 Quetta-IX | Quetta District | Ahmed Umer Ahmedzai | BAP |

== Members of Parliament ==
=== 2018–2023: NA-266 Quetta-III ===
| Election | Member | Party |
|---|---|---|
| 2018 | Agha Hassan Baloch | BNP-M |

=== 2024–present: NA-264 Quetta-III ===
| Election | Member | Party |
|---|---|---|
| 2024 | Jamal Raisani | PPP |

== Election 2018 ==
General elections were held on 25 July 2018.

General election 2018: NA-266 Quetta-III
| Party | Candidate | Votes | % |
|---|---|---|---|
| BNP (M) | Agha Hassan Baloch | 20,034 | 32.55 |
| MMA | Hafiz Hussain Ahmed | 11,057 | 17.97 |
| PMAP | Jamal Khan Taraki | 9,129 | 14.83 |
| PTI | Zainul Abideen Khan Khilji | 5,622 | 9.14 |
| BAP | Prince Ahmed Umer Ahmedzai | 5,120 | 8.32 |
| PPP | Mir Riaz Ahmed Shahwani | 5,014 | 8.15 |
| Others | Others (fourteen candidates) | 5,565 | 9.04 |
| Turnout | | 64,320 | 34.30 |
| Valid ballots | | 61,541 | 95.68 |
| Rejected ballots | | 2,779 | 4.32 |
| Majority | | 8,977 | 14.58 |
| Registered electors | | 187,539 | |
| BNP (M) win (new seat) | | | |

== Election 2024 ==
General elections were held on 8 February 2024. Jamal Raisani won the election with 14,977 votes.

General election 2024: NA-264 Quetta-III
| Party | Candidate | Votes | % | ±% |
|---|---|---|---|---|
| PPP | Jamal Raisani | 14,977 | 24.90 | ▲16.75 |
| BNP (M) | Akhtar Mengal | 10,057 | 16.72 | ▼15.83 |
| JUI (F) | Abdul Rehman | 8,872 | 14.75 | N/A |
| PTI | Zain Ul Abidin Khan (Note: Filed nomination papers as PTI candidate but ECP allowed him to run as an Independent) | 6,021 | 10.01 | ▲0.87 |
| NP | Mir Kabeer Ahmed | 4,100 | 6.82 | ▲4.67 |
| PMAP | Jamal Khan | 3,591 | 5.97 | ▼8.86 |
| PNAP | Noor Gul Khan | 3,578 | 5.95 | N/A |
| PML(N) | Haji Arz Muhammad Barech | 2,477 | 4.12 | ▲2.71 |
| Others | Others (twenty-seven candidates) | 6,481 | 10.77 | |
| Turnout | | 61,193 | 31.10 | ▼3.20 |
| Total valid votes | | 60,154 | 98.30 | |
| Rejected ballots | | 1,039 | 1.70 | |
| Majority | | 4,920 | 8.18 | |
| Registered electors | | 196,762 | | |
| PPP gain from BNP (M) | | | | |

== See also ==
- NA-263 Quetta-II
- NA-265 Pishin
