= Riaz Hussain =

Riaz Hussain may refer to,

- Riaz Hussain (politician), first governor of Balochistan province of Pakistan
- Malik Riaz Hussain, Pakistani businessman
