= NA-256 Khuzdar =

Constituency of the National Assembly of Pakistan

- Constituency for the National Assembly of Pakistan
- Region: Khuzdar District
- Electorate: 300,082

Current constituency
- Created: 2022
- Member: Vacant
- Created from: NA-269 Khuzdar

NA-256 Khuzdar (این اے-256، خضدار) is a constituency for the National Assembly of Pakistan in the Khuzdar District of the Balochistan province of Pakistan.

== Assembly Segments ==
Constituency number	Constituency	District	Current MPA	Party
18	PB-18 Khuzdar-I	Khuzdar	Sanaullah Khan Zehri	PPP
19	PB-19 Khuzdar-II	Khuzdar	Mir Younus Aziz Zehri	JUI(F)
20	PB-20 Khuzdar-III	Khuzdar	Mir Jahanzaib Mengal	BNP(M)

== Members of Parliament ==
=== 2018–2023: NA-269 Khuzdar ===
Election	Member	Party
2018	Akhtar Mengal	BNP-M

=== 2024–2026: NA-256 Khuzdar ===
Election	Member	Party
2024	Akhtar Mengal	BNP-M

== Election 2002 ==
General elections were held on 10 October 2002. Abdur Rauf Mengal of Balochistan National Party won by 27,269 votes.

General election 2002: NA-269 Khuzdar
Party	Candidate	Votes	%	±%
BNP (M)	Rauf Mengal	27,269	48.65	
BNM	Mir Muhammad Ayub Jattak	24,359	43.46	
Independent	Mir Younus Aziz Zehri	4,012	7.16	
Others	Others (four candidates)	769	0.73	
Turnout		59,030	23.34	
Total valid votes		56,409	95.56	
Rejected ballots		2,621	4.44	
Majority		2,910	5.19	
Registered electors		252,902		

== Election 2008 ==
General elections were held on 18 February 2008. Muhammad Usman Advocate an independent candidate won by 27,609 votes.

General election 2008: NA-269 Khuzdar
Party	Candidate	Votes	%	±%
Independent	Muhammad Usman	17,609	30.01	
MMA	Qamar ud Din	15,938	27.17	
NP	Mir Muhammad Ayub Jattak	11,230	19.14	
Independent	Mir Abdul Rehman Zehri	5,276	8.99	
PPP	Mir Imran Jattak	4,986	8.50	
Others	Others (six candidates)	3,633	6.19	
Turnout		62,873	33.69	
Total valid votes		58,672	93.32	
Rejected ballots		4,201	6.68	
Majority		1,671	2.84	
Registered electors		186,598		
Independent gain from BNP (M)				

== Election 2013 ==
General elections were held on 11 May 2013. Molana Qamar ud Din of JUI-F won by 26,028 and became the member of National Assembly.

General election 2013: NA-269 Khuzdar
Party	Candidate	Votes	%	±%
JUI (F)	Qamar ud Din	26,028	36.02	
BNP (M)	Rauf Mengal	25,970	35.94	
PML(N)	Sanaullah Khan Zehri	15,338	21.23	
Others	Others (nine candidates)	4,925	6.81	
Turnout		75,859	45.80	
Total valid votes		72,261	95.26	
Rejected ballots		3,598	4.74	
Majority		58	0.08	
Registered electors		165,632		
JUI (F) gain from Independent				

== Election 2018 ==
General elections were held on 25 July 2018.

General election 2018: NA-269 Khuzdar
Party	Candidate	Votes	%	±%
BNP (M)	Akhtar Mengal	52,875	46.52	
BAP	Muhammad Khalid Bizenjo	19,720	17.35	
Independent	Mir Shafiqur Rehman Mengal	14,559	12.81	
BNP (A)	Huzoor Bakhsh	9,702	8.54	
PML(N)	Abdul Rehman	4,609	4.06	
NP	Muhammad Asif Baloch	4,107	3.61	
TLP	Wazir Ahmed Noorani	2,494	2.19	
PPP	Abdul Raheem	2,370	2.09	
Others	Others (five candidates)	3,214	2.83	
Turnout		124,155	54.32	
Total valid votes		113,650	91.54	
Rejected ballots		10,505	8.46	
Majority		33,155	29.17	
Registered electors		228,547		
BNP (M) gain from JUI (F)				

== Election 2024 ==
General elections were held on 8 February 2024. Akhtar Mengal won the election with 65,952 votes.

General election 2024: NA-256 Khuzdar
Party	Candidate	Votes	%	±%
BNP (M)	Akhtar Mengal	65,952	48.26	▲1.74
PPP	Abdul Rehman	29,074	21.28	▲19.19
Independent	Nawabzada Mir Israrullah	18,318	13.41	N/A
Independent	Mir Shafiq Ur Rahman Mengal	18,318	13.41	▲0.60
Others	Others (eleven candidates)	11,177	8.18	
Turnout		145,417	48.46	▼5.86
Total valid votes		136,648	93.97	
Rejected ballots		8,769	6.03	
Majority		36,878	26.99	
Registered electors		300,082		
BNP (M) hold				

== See also ==
- NA-255 Sohbat Pur-cum-Jaffarabad-cum-Usta Muhammad-cum-Nasirabad
- NA-257 Hub-cum-Lasbela-cum-Awaran
