= Mula River (Pakistan) =

Coordinates: 27°57′N 67°36′E

Mula

Location
- Country: Pakistan

Mula River is located in Balochistan, Pakistan. It is located at an elevation of 45 meters above sea level.

A dam, namely Naulong Dam, is currently under-construction on this river at Jhal Magsi, Pakistan. Farmers grow wheat, in every winter, around the river.

== See also ==
- Naulong Dam
