= Governor (Pakistan) =

A governor (Urdu: گورنر—Gawarnar) is the head of a province, appointed by the president of Pakistan on the advice of the prime minister. The governor is the nominal head of the provincial executive and the representative of the federal government in the province. Articles 101 to 105 of the Constitution of Pakistan deal with the appointment, conditions, and duties of a governor.

A governor should be eligible to be elected as a member of the National Assembly of Pakistan, and should be at least 35 years old. They should also be a registered voter of the concerned province, and should not hold any office of profit. The chief justice of the concerned province's High Court administers the oath of office, after which the governor is not eligible for the election as a member of the Parliament of Pakistan and the Provincial Assemblies as long as they are in office.

In case of a governor's absence, the speaker of the Provincial Assembly becomes the acting governor of the province.

== Head of region ==
Name	Image	State	Office	Mandate start (Age)
Sultan Mehmood Chaudhry		Azad Kashmir	President	25 August 2021 (aged ?)
Sheikh Jaffar Khan Mandokhail		Balochistan	Governor	6 May 2024 (aged 67)
Syed Mehdi Shah		Gilgit-Baltistan	Governor	15 August 2022 (aged ?)
Faisal Karim Kundi		Khyber Pakhtunkhwa	Governor	4 May 2024 (aged 48)
Sardar Saleem Haider Khan		Punjab	Governor	10 May 2024 (aged ?)
Nehal Hashmi		Sindh	Governor	10 October 2022 (aged ?)

== Current governors in Pakistan ==
The table below lists the currently-serving governors of Pakistan as of January 2023.

Province	Name	Took office (tenure length)	Party	Notes
Balochistan (list)	Sheikh Jaffar Khan Mandokhail	6 May 2024 (2 years, 177 days)	PMLN	
Khyber Pakhtunkhwa (list)	Faisal Karim Kundi	4 May 2024 (2 years, 179 days)	PPP	
Punjab (list)	Sardar Saleem Haider Khan	10 May 2024 (2 years, 173 days)	PPP	
Sindh (list)	Nehal Hashmi	13 March 2026 (231 days)	PML-N	
Gilgit-Baltistan (list)	Syed Mehdi Shah	15 August 2022 (4 years, 126 days)	IND	

=== Heads of administrative territories ===
Territory	Name	Took office (tenure length)	Party	Notes
Azad Kashmir	Sultan Mehmood Chaudhry (President)	25 August 2021 (5 years, 66 days)	IND	

== See also ==
- List of presidents of Pakistan
- Chief Secretary (Pakistan)
- List of current Pakistani chief ministers
