= Asif Mengal =

Sardar Asif Zagr Mengal

Personal details
- Born: 1960 (age 65–66)

Sardar Asif Mengal is the head of Zagar Mengal clan of Mengal tribe, Zagar Mengal is one of the two main clans of the Mengal tribe in the Balochistan. He is the younger son of late Sardar Mustafa Khan Mengal. He succeeded his elder brother Sardar Naseer Khan Mengal as the head of Zagr Mengal after his demise in 2005. He is a popular political and tribal figure of Noshki. Sardar Asif Mengal plays an important role in the traditional jirga system to resolve conflicts among Baloch tribes.
