= Siraj Raisani =

Pakistani politician

Nawabzada Mir Siraj Khan Raisani
- Born: 4 April 1963; Mehrgarh, Balochistan province, Pakistan
- Died: 13 July 2018 (aged 55); Mastung, Balochistan province, Pakistan
- Cause of death: Suicide bombing
- Resting place: Kanak, Mastung, Balochistan province, Pakistan
- Other name: Siraj Khan Raisani
- Education: BSc agronomy
- Alma mater: Sindh Agriculture University
- Occupations: Agriculturist, politician
- Political party: Balochistan Awami Party (BAP)
- Children: Shaheed Nawabzada Mir Hakmal Raisani (deceased); Nawabzada Mir Jamal Raisani
- Father: Nawab Ghous Baksh Raisani
- Family: Nawab Aslam Raisani (brother); Nawabzada Lashkari Raisani (brother)

Mir Siraj Khan Raisani (4 April 1963 – 13 July 2018) was a Pakistani politician from Balochistan. He belonged to the Balochistan Awami Party (BAP). Previously, he had served as the chief of the political party called Balochistan Muttahida Mahaz (BMM) until June 2018. Later, he merged BMM with BAP.

He was assassinated in a suicide bombing while campaigning for his seat prior to the 2018 general elections.

== Early life and education ==
Mir Siraj Khan Raisani was born on 4 April 1963 in Mehrgarh area of Bolan district. He belonged to Raisani tribe of the Brahvi ethnicity.

He came from a politically distinguished family. His father, Ghous Bakhsh Raisani, served as the governor of the Balochistan province between 1970 and 1971. His eldest brother Aslam Raisani served as the 13th Chief Minister of Balochistan from 2008 to 2013. Another of his brothers, Lashkari Raisani, served as a senator in the Senate of Pakistan from 2009 to 2015. Siraj himself, was the head of a political party named Balochistan Muttahida Mahaz (Balochistan United Front) until June 2018. The party was founded by his father. Later he merged it into the newly formed Balochistan Awami Party.

Siraj Raisani obtained his early education from government institutions in Bolan. He then went on to get a bachelor's degree in agronomy from the Sindh Agriculture University in Tando Jam. After that he undertook a course in floriculture from an academic institute in the Netherlands.

== Political work ==
Siraj Raisani was a hard working politician. He had served as the chief of the political party called Balochistan Muttahida Mahaz (BMM) until June 2018. BMM was formed by his father Ghous Bakhsh Raisani in the 1970s. He later merged the BMM with the newly formed Balochistan Awami Party (BAP).

He held the record of making the longest Pakistani flag stretching from Mastung to Quetta.

He wanted to unite the various tribes of Balochistan in pursuit of the province's rights. Upon joining the Balochistan Awami Party (BAP) in June 2018, he said that the decision was made keeping in view the "BAP's mission to unite people from all tribes and ethnic backgrounds living in the province for the rights of the province."

Raisani was regarded as true patriot and a brave politician in Pakistan. He boldly raised his voice against anti-Pakistani groups. Throughout his career, Raisani had received many death threats. He was advised by some not to campaign in public and was instead offered a ticket for Senate. However, he declined and insisted that he wanted to serve the people of his country.

== Assassination ==
Bismillah ar-Rahman, ar-Raheem, my brave people of Balochistan...

— Last words of Siraj Raisani.

While on the trail in his campaign for the Balochistan Provincial Assembly seat of PB-35 (Mastung), he had held a political gathering in the Daringarh area of the Mastung District on 13 July 2018. He was about to address the people gathered inside the ceremonial tent and had just taken to the stage when a powerful suicide blast ripped through the audience. Siraj Raisani was one of the 131 people who were killed in the attack. Islamic State of Iraq and Levant claimed responsibility for the bombing.

Raisani was laid to rest in his ancestral graveyard in Kanak area of Mastung on 14 July 2018. His funeral was attended by dignitaries from across Pakistan, including army chief, Qamar Javed Bajwa and interim Chief Minister of Baluchistan, Alauddin Marri. A day of national mourning was also declared.

United States also condemned the attack on Siraj Raisani. United States termed the attack on Raisani as a cowardly attempt to deprive the Pakistani people of their democratic rights. US State Department Spokesperson Heather Nauert, also stated that they will continue to stand with the people of Pakistan in their fight against terrorism.

After his assassination his youngest son Nawabzada Mir Jamal Khan Raisani is continuing his legacy, trying to unite various tribes of Balochistan under the flag of Pakistan.

== Awards and honors ==
He was posthumously awarded Sitara-e-Shujaat, a civilian medal for brave conduct, on 23 March 2019. The award was received by his son, Nawabzada Mir Jamal Raisani.
