= PB-11 Jhal Magsi =

Constituency of the Provincial Assembly of Balochistan, Pakistan

- Constituency for the Provincial Assembly of Balochistan
- Region: Jhal Magsi District

Current constituency
- Party: Balochistan Awami Party
- Member: Nawabzada Tariq Magsi
- Created from: PB-31 (Kachhi-II)

PB-11 Jhal Magsi (پی بی-11 جھل مگسی) is a constituency of the Provincial Assembly of Balochistan.

== General elections 2024 ==
Provincial election 2024: PB-11 Jhal Magsi
Party	Candidate	Votes	%	±%
BAP	Nawabzada Tariq Magsi	44,763	90.62	
BNP (M)	Mir Murtaza Abbas	1,244	2.52	
Others	Others (ten candidates)	3,392	6.86	
Turnout		50,598	68.29	
Total valid votes		49,399	97.63	
Rejected ballots		1,199	2.37	
Majority		43,519	88.10	
Registered electors		74,092		

== General elections 2013 ==
Contesting candidates	Party affiliation	Votes polled

== General elections 2008 ==
Contesting candidates	Party affiliation	Votes polled

== See also ==
- PB-10 Dera Bugti
- PB-12 Kachhi
