= Naulong Dam =

Dam in Balochistan, Pakistan

- Country: Pakistan
- Location: Jhal Magsi, Balochistan, Pakistan
- Status: Project
- Opening date: Unknown
- Construction cost: PKR 28.5 billion
- Owner: Government of Balochistan

Dam and spillways
- Type of dam: Zoned Earth-fill Dam
- Height: 57 m (187 ft)
- Length: 913 m (2,995 ft)

Reservoir
- Total capacity: 0.242 MAF

Power Station
- Installed capacity: 4.4 MW

Naulong Dam is an embankment dam currently under construction on the Mula River, about 30 km from Gandawah City in Jhal Magsi district of Balochistan, Pakistan. Its construction contract has been awarded to Descon Engineering Limited, which is the biggest contractor in Pakistan.

The zoned earth-filled dam is 57 m (187 ft) high with a gross storage of 0.242 MAF and a command area of 19,020 ha (47,000 acres). It has a hydro power capacity of 4.4 MW.

== History ==
Feasibility studies for the dam were completed in 2009 and construction was planned to start the same year, for a completion in 2012. However, the project was heavily delayed, and the dam remains unbuilt by 2019. Work is expected to start by August-2024.

== See also ==
List of dams and reservoirs in Pakistan
