= Lashkari Raisani =

Pakistani politician

Senator Mir Haji Lashkari Khan Raisani

Member of the Senate of Pakistan
- In office March 2009 – March 2015
- Constituency: Balochistan

Member of the Provincial Assembly of Balochistan
- In office 1993–1996
- Constituency: PB-24 Bolan

Personal details
- Born: 18 February 1963 (age 63)
- Party: IND (2023–present)
- Other political affiliations: BNP(M) (2017–2023); PMLN (2013–2017); PPP (2005–2013); IND (1997–2005); Pakistan National Party (1988–1997)

Nawabzada Mir Haji Lashkari Khan Raisani is a Baloch politician and former senator. He is member of Balochistan National Party (Mengal), the former member of Pakistan Muslim League and former President of the Pakistan Peoples Party for Balochistan as of 2010. He served as a senator in the Senate of Pakistan from 2009 to 2015.

He is the son of former governor Balochistan Nawab Ghous Baksh Raisani. He is the older brother of late Shaheed Nawabzada Mir Siraj Khan Raisani who died in a suicide bomb blast in his hometown Mastung.

Muhammad Aslam Khan Raisani and Siraj Raisani are his siblings among others.
