= Nawabzada Saifullah Magsi =

Pakistani politician

Senator Nawabzada Saifullah Magsi

Member of the Senate of Pakistan
- In office March 2012 – March 2018

Personal details
- Parents: Zulfiqar Ali Magsi (father); Shama Parveen Magsi (mother)

Nawabzada Saifullah Magsi (Urdu: نوابزادہ سیف اللہ مگسی) is a Pakistani politician who has been a member of Senate of Pakistan from March 2012 to March 2018.

== Education ==
He has done Bachelor of Laws from University College London in 2004.

== Political career ==
He was elected to the Senate of Pakistan as a candidate of Pakistan Peoples Party in the 2012 Pakistani Senate election.
