= Syed Zahoor Ahmad Agha =

Pakistani politician

Syed Zahoor Ahmad Agha سید ظہور احمد آغا

22nd Governor of Balochistan
- In office 9 July 2021 – 13 April 2022
- President: Arif Alvi
- Prime Minister: Imran Khan
- Preceded by: Amanullah Khan Yasinzai

Personal details
- Born: 4 October 1971 (age 54) Pishin District Balochistan, Pakistan
- Party: PTI (2011-present)

Syed Zahoor Ahmad Agha (Urdu: سید ظہور احمد آغا) is a Pakistani politician who served as the 23rd Governor of Balochistan from 9 July 2021 to 13 April 2022.

== Early life and education ==
He received his early education from Killi Muchaan School, Pishin and got a master's degree in Animal Science from the University of Uganda. He owns 260 animal husbandries.

== Career ==
Zahoor Agha has been associated with Pakistan Tehreek-e-Insaf (PTI) since 2011.

He ran for the seat of the Provincial Assembly of the Balochistan as a Pakistan Tehreek-e-Insaf candidate from Constituency PB-6 (Quetta-VI) in the 2013 Pakistani general election, but was unsuccessful. He received only 2256 votes and lost the seat to Manzoor Ahmad Khan Kakar, a candidate of Pashtunkhwa Milli Awami Party (PKMAP).

On 7 July 2021, after the resignation of Amanullah Khan Yasinzai he was appointed as Governor of Balochistan by Prime Minister Imran Khan. He took oath at Governor House, Quetta on 9 July 2021. Chief Justice Balochistan High Court Justice Jamal Khan Mandokhail administered the oath.
