= Abdul Wali Kakar =

Pakistani politician and businessman

- عبدالولی کاکڑ

23rd Governor of Balochistan
- In office 3 March 2023 – 6 May 2024
- President: Arif Alvi; Asif Ali Zardari
- Prime Minister: Shehbaz Sharif; Anwaar ul Haq Kakar; Shehbaz Sharif
- Preceded by: Jan Mohammad Jamali
- Succeeded by: Sheikh Jaffar Khan Mandokhail

Abdul Wali Kakar (Urdu: عبدالولی کاکڑ) is a Pakistani politician, wo served as the Governor of Balochistan from 3 March 2023 till 6 May 2024. Kakar is a member of the Balochistan National Party (Mengal) party. He is also the senior vice president of the Balochistan National Party (Mengal) party.

Political offices
| Preceded by Jan Mohammad Jamali (acting) | Governor of Balochistan; 2023 – present | Incumbent |
