= Amanullah Khan Yasinzai =

Pakistani politician

Amanullah Khan Yasinzai امان اللہ خان یاسینزئی

21st Governor of Balochistan
- In office 4 October 2018 – 7 July 2021
- President: Arif Alvi
- Prime Minister: Imran Khan
- Preceded by: Muhammad Khan Achakzai
- Succeeded by: Syed Zahoor Ahmad Agha

Chief Justice of Balochistan High Court
- In office 14 September 2005 – 5 August 2009

Justice of Balochistan High Court
- In office 27 January 1997 – 5 August 2009

Personal details
- Born: 7 August 1954 (age 72) Quetta, Balochistan, Pakistan

Amanullah Khan Yasinzai (Urdu: امان اللہ خان یاسینزئی; born 7 August 1954) is a Pakistani retired judge who served as the 21st Governor of Balochistan. He is a former Chief Justice of the Balochistan High Court (BHC).

== Early life and education ==
Yasinzai was born on 7 August 1954 in Quetta. He received his Bachelors' and Master's degree from Forman Christian College in Lahore.

== Career ==
Yasinzai served as a Justice of the Balochistan High Court from 27 January 1997 to 5 August 2009. He served as the Chief Justice of the BHC from 14 September 2005 until his resignation in 2009. He took oath under the Provisional Constitutional Order when former president Pervez Musharraf declared an emergency in November 2007. He seemingly resigned from his post to avoid facing references in the Supreme Judicial Council of Pakistan following a Supreme Court judgment in the PCO Judges case.

Yasinzai was appointed as the 24th Governor of Balochistan by President of Pakistan Arif Alvi on the advice of Prime Minister of Pakistan Imran Khan on 3 October 2018. He took oath of office on 4 October 2018.

He presented his resignation to President of Pakistan on 7 July 2021. His resignation was accepted by President Arif Alvi.
