= Qamar ud Din =

Pakistani politician

Member of the National Assembly of Pakistan
- In office 1 June 2013 – 31 May 2018
- Constituency: NA-269 (Khuzdar)

Personal details
- Party: Jamiat Ulema-e-Islam (F)

Qamar ud Din (Urdu: قمرالدی) is a Pakistani politician who had been a member of the National Assembly of Pakistan from June 2013 to May 2018.

== Political career ==
He ran for the seat of the National Assembly of Pakistan as a candidate of Muttahida Majlis-e-Amal (MMA) from Constituency NA-269 (Khuzdar) in the 2008 Pakistani general election but was unsuccessful. He received 15,938 votes and lost the seat to Muhammad Usman.

He was elected to the National Assembly of Pakistan as a candidate of Jamiat Ulema-e-Islam (F) (JUI-F) from Constituency NA-269 (Khuzdar) in the 2013 Pakistani general election. He received 26,028 votes and defeated Mir Abdul Rauf Mengal, a candidate of the Balochistan National Party (BNP).

== See also ==
- List of Deobandis
