= Mengal =

Ethnic Baloch tribe inhabiting Balochistan, Pakistan

Mengal (Brahui: مینگل) is an ethnic Brahui tribe inhabiting Balochistan, Pakistan. It belongs to the Jhalawani branch of the Brahui tribes, and is bilingual in Brahui and Balochi.

== Origins ==
According to the official list by Mir Ahmad Yar, the last Khan of Kalat, Mengal was originally one of the Jaṭṭ tribes inhabiting Balochistan. In the Balochi language, plurals of substantives and collective nouns are formed, generally, by adding the suffix "gal" to the noun itself, tribes like Jadgal, Kurdgal are formed in this manner, similarly the term Mengal (Meng-gal,) merely denotes the Meng (Ming, or Men, or Min) name of a tribe and the suffix "gal" means (Speech and group), thus meaning (the group of Mins).

== Tribal area ==
The Mengal tribal area is around 70,000 square miles (180,000 km^{2}), stretching from the Helmand River in the North to Lasbela District in the south, and bordering on the province of Sindh to the east.

== Prominent people ==
- Sardar Ataullah Mengal, a former Chief Minister of Balochistan.
- Sardar Akhtar Mengal, another former Chief Minister of Balochistan.
- Mir Amir-ul-Mulk Mengal was Governor and Chief Justice of Balochistan.
- Mir Muhammad Naseer Mengal served as acting Chief Minister of Balochistan and as Pakistan's acting Minister of State for Petroleum and Natural Resources.
- Mir Nooruddin Mengal was a prominent politician of Balochistan. He was assassinated on 13 October 2010.
- Mir Jahanzaib Mengal is currently serving as a member of the Provincial Assembly of Balochistan
- Shafiq Mengal is a politician, former pro-government militia leader, and drug trafficker
