= Nawabzada Tariq Magsi =

Pakistani politician

Provincial Minister of Balochistan for Communication and Works
- In office 30 August 2018 – 12 August 2023

Member of the Provincial Assembly of Balochistan
- In office 13 August 2018 – 12 August 2023
- Constituency: PB-16 Jhal Magsi-cum-Kachhi
- In office 31 August 2013 – 31 May 2018
- Constituency: PB-32 Jhal Magsi-cum-Kachhi

Personal details
- Born: 8 September 1954 (age 71) Jhal Magsi District, Balochistan, Pakistan
- Party: BAP (2018-present)
- Other political affiliations: PML(Q) (2002-2018); IND (1998-1993)
- Relatives: Mir Zulfiqar Ali Khan Magsi (brother) Mir Nadir Ali Khan Magsi(brother) Khalid Hussain Magsi(brother) Mir Aamir Ali Khan Magsi (brother)

Nawabzada Tariq Magsi is a Pakistani politician who was the Provincial Minister of Balochistan for Communication and Works, in office from 30 August 2018 to 12 August 2023. He had been a member of the Provincial Assembly of Balochistan from August 2018 to August 2023 and from August 2013 to May 2018.

== Early life and education ==
He was born on 8 September 1954 in Jhal Magsi District.

He has a degree in Bachelor of Arts.

He is brother of Mir Zulfiqar Ali Khan Magsi.

== Political career ==
He was elected to the National Assembly of Pakistan from Constituency NA-201 in the 1988 Pakistani general election.

He was elected to the Senate of Pakistan in 1990 where he remained as a Senator until 1996.

He was elected to the Provincial Assembly of Balochistan as a candidate of Pakistan Muslim League (Q) from Constituency PB 32-Kachi III in the 2002 Pakistani general election.

He was re-elected to the Provincial Assembly of Balochistan as an independent candidate from Constituency PB-32 (Jhal Magsi Old Kacchi-III) in the 2008 Pakistani general election.

In December 2012, he was appointed as leader of the opposition in the Provincial Balochistan Assembly.

He was re-elected to the Provincial Assembly of Balochistan as an independent candidate from Constituency PB-32 Jhal Magsi in by-election held in August 2013.

He was re-elected to the Provincial Assembly of Balochistan as a candidate of Balochistan Awami Party (BAP) from Constituency PB-16 (Jhal Magsi-cum-Kachhi) in 2018 Pakistani general election.

On 27 August 2018, he was inducted into the provincial Balochistan cabinet of Chief Minister Jam Kamal Khan. On 30 August, he was appointed as Provincial Minister of Balochistan for communication and works.
