= Agha Hassan Baloch =

Pakistani politician

Member of the National Assembly of Pakistan
- In office 13 August 2018 – 10 August 2023
- Constituency: NA-266 (Quetta-III)

Personal details
- Born: Quetta, Balochistan, Pakistan
- Party: BNP(M) (2018-present)

Agha Hassan Baloch is a Pakistani politician who had been a member of the National Assembly of Pakistan from August 2018 till August 2023.

== Political career ==
He was elected to the National Assembly of Pakistan from Constituency NA-266 (Quetta-III) as a candidate of Balochistan National Party (Mengal) in the 2018 Pakistani general election. now he is Federal Minister for Ministry of Science & Technology. He has a Masters in Political Science with Law Graduate and is a practicing lawyer.
