= Mohammad Usman (Balochistan politician) =

Pakistani politician

Member of the National Assembly of Pakistan
- In office 2008–2013
- Constituency: NA-269 (Khuzdar)

Mohammad Usman is a Pakistani politician who was a member of the National Assembly of Pakistan from 2008 to 2013.

== Political career ==
He was elected to the National Assembly of Pakistan from Constituency NA-269 (Khuzdar) as an independent candidate in the 2008 Pakistani general election. He received 17,609 votes and defeated Molana Qamar ud Din. In the same election, he ran for the seat of the Provincial Assembly of Balochistan from Constituency PB-33 (Khuzdar-I) as an independent candidate but was unsuccessful. He received 399 votes and lost the seat to Sanaullah Khan Zehri.
