= Gandava =

- Town
- Location within Balochistan, Pakistan Location within Pakistan
- Coordinates: 28°37′N 67°29′E
- Country: Pakistan
- Province: Balochistan
- Division: Nasirabad
- District: Jhal Magsi

Population (2023)
  - Total: 24,130
- Time zone: UTC+5 (PST)

Gandavah is a town that serves as the headquarters of Jhal Magsi District in the Pakistani province of Balochistan. Located on a small hill in the middle of the Kach Gandava plains, Gandava is inhabited by an ethnically mix population of Sindhi, Baloch, Pathan, Brahui, and Hindu communities. As of the 2017 Census of Pakistan, Gandava Municipal Corporation has a population of 7,825 people, in 1,256 households, which rose to 24,130 in 2023.

The town has a long history and several old architectural monuments including the Moti Gohram tomb, locally known as "the Taj Mahal of Baluchistan". Gandava also faces significant difficulties with needs like water, electricity, gas, healthcare, and education.

== Name ==
The oldest name associated with the city is Qandabil, which appears in the medieval Arabic sources. Supposedly the name derives from the sweetness of its drinking water. The present name Gandava first appears in classical Balochi poetry of the 15th century and has been widely used since the 18th century. A third name, Ganjaba, first appears in sources from the 16th century. It refers to "an abundance of water".

== History ==
Bheel was one of the oldest tribes in region and Gandawa was one of the provincial headquarters of the Bhil dynasty. According to a legend, pre-Islamic Qandabil was founded by Bahman Ardashir to mark the boundary between the Indians and the Turks. Muslim armies first reached Qandabil in 644, but soon withdrew after hearing of the caliph Umar's death that same year. Qandabil was then ruled by the Chach dynasty of Sindh and became a refuge for Arabs fleeing from the Umayyad government.

In 688, the Kharijite rebel Atiyya ibn al-Aswad al-Hanafi fled to Qandabil pursued by a section of al-Muhallab ibn Abi Sufra's army, and they killed him here. Six years later, members of the Ilafi tribe killed Sa'id ibn Aslam, the Muslim commander of Makran, at Qandabil. Al-Hajjaj ibn Yusuf sent Mujja'a ibn Si'r to punish the 'Ilafis in 904; they fled before he could reach them but he was able to subjugate "the tribes of Qandabil" who had probably been aligned with the 'Ilafis. From 704 to 711, Qandabil was held by Raja Dahir, who appointed his nephew Dhol as governor of Budhiya.

In 711, the Muslims under Muhammad ibn al-Qasim decisively gained control of Qandabil, which became part of Muslim-ruled Sind. In 720, al-Muhallab's rebellious sons fled to Qandabil, expecting to be given refuge, but their ally Wada' shut the gates and refused them entry and they were killed fighting against their pursuer Hilal ibn Ahwaz al-Tamimi. In 754 Arab tribes occupied Qandabil but they were driven out by the governor of Sind, Hisham ibn 'Amr. Later, in 837, Qandabil was taken by Muhammad ibn Khalil, but 'Imran, governor of Sindh, recaptured the city and restored order.

Medieval Qandabil was the capital of the district called Budha or Budhiya (which was named not because its inhabitants were Buddhists but rather because they belonged to the Budh ethnic group) and had the town of Kizkanan or Kikan, possibly the same as present-day Kalat, as one of its dependencies. The 9th-century writer al-Baladhuri described Qandabil as being on an elevated site in the middle of the plain, which matches the present-day description of Gandava. A century later, Ibn Hawqal described Qandabil as a large city standing alone on a plain where no date palms grew. Also in the 10th century, al-Istakhri described Qandabil as "the central market-place of the Budha hinterland, where 'the Budh people' sold their produce and obtained their supplies". By the late 10th century, palm trees had been planted in the area around Qandabil – the anonymous author of the Hudud al-'Alam wrote that it was "a big city, prosperous and pleasant, producing large quantities of dates."

In the second half of the 15th century, Gandava (as it was now called) became the capital of the Lashari Baloch confederation under alliance with the Samma dynasty. In 1518, Shah Beg Arghun occupied Gandava while on his way to conquer Sindh. The city later came under Mughall rule in 1574 and formed part of the mahal of Fathpur and was administered from Bukkur.

Gandava was later ruled by the Kalhora dynasty. The city walls were repaired in the early 1700s by a Kalhora officer named Murad and were still standing in the 19th century but are now in ruins. In 1740, Nader Shah defeated the Kalhoras and transferred Gandava to the Khans of Kalat. It remained under their control until 1955 and served as their winter residence.

== Demographics ==
=== Population ===
Historical population
Year	Pop.	±% p.a.
1951	...	—
1961	1,748	—
1972	3,007	+5.06%
1981	...	—
1998	8,097	—
2017	7,815	−0.19%
2023	24,130	+20.67%

As of the 2023 census, Gandava had a population of 24,130.
