= Governor of Balochistan, Pakistan =

Political position in Balochistan, Pakistan

Governor of Balochistan
- گورنر بلوچستان فرماندار بلوچستان د بلوچستان والي والی بلوچستان

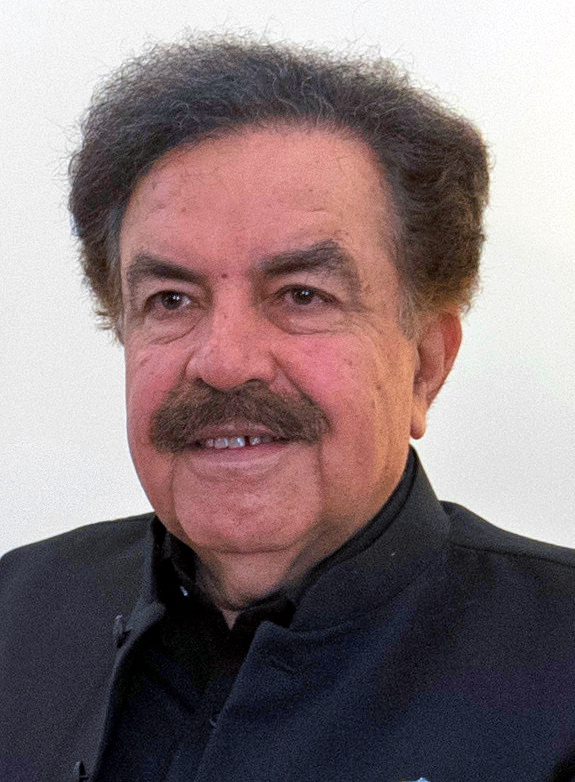
- Incumbent; Sheikh Jaffar Khan Mandokhail since 6 May 2024
- Style: The Honorable (formal)
- Reports to: President of Pakistan
- Residence: Governor House
- Seat: Quetta
- Nominator: Prime Minister of Pakistan
- Appointer: President of Pakistan
- Constituting instrument: Constitution of Pakistan
- Formation: 1 July 1970; 56 years ago
- First holder: Riaz Hussain
- Website: governorbalochistan.gov.pk

The Governor of Balochistan is the head of the province of Balochistan, Pakistan. The post was established on 1 July 1970, after the dissolution of West Pakistan province and the end of One Unit. Under Pakistan's current parliamentary system, the governorship is a ceremonial position, as a symbol of the federation. The governor is appointed by the centre, whereas the principal head of the provincial government remains the elected Chief Minister of Balochistan.

Despite this, Balochistan has seen several periods of martial law or governor's rule where, in the absence of a chief minister, the governor exercised broad powers. As of March 2023, Abdul Wali Kakar is serving as acting governor after the resignation of Syed Zahoor Ahmad Agha on 4 March 2023.

The first governor of the province was Riaz Hussain (1970–1971). The longest-serving governor was Rahimuddin Khan (1978–1984).

== Periods of governor's rule ==
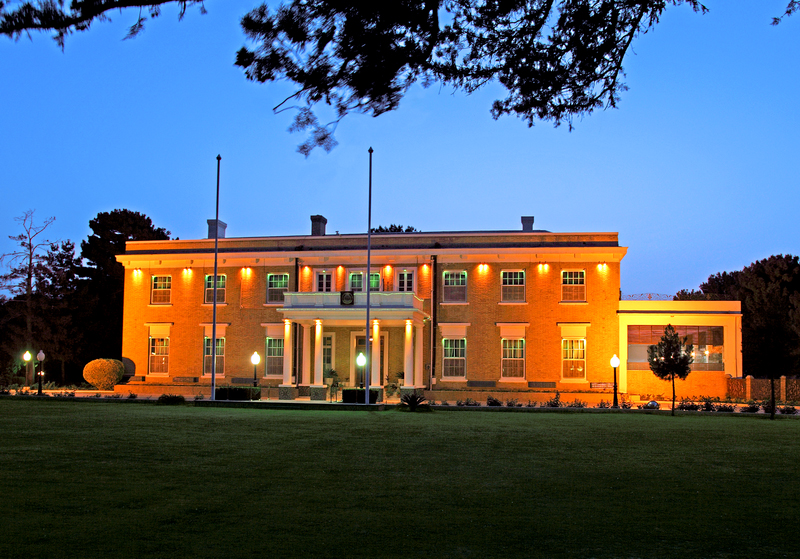
Governor House in Quetta

After the dissolution of One Unit in 1970, Balochistan attained the status of a full province, administered by its first governor, General Riaz Hussain, pending general elections, which were held the same year. The left-wing National Awami Party (NAP) secured the highest number of votes in the province, whereas the ruling party at the centre, the Pakistan People's Party (PPP) under Zulfikar Ali Bhutto, secured none. The NAP ministry was however dismissed by Bhutto in 1973, and its senior leaders were imprisoned. Bhutto imposed governor's rule under Akbar Bugti, and military operations against tribal insurgents commenced in 1973.

After the Bhutto regime was overthrown in a military coup by General Zia-ul-Haq in 1977, the NAP leaders were released and the Chief Justice of the Balochistan High Court, Khuda Bakhsh Marri, became governor; the other chief justices also became governors of their corresponding provinces. Marri was replaced by General Rahimuddin Khan, who announced a general amnesty, ending military action in the province.

Governor's rule returned under military ruler Pervez Musharraf, who dissolved the provincial government in 1999, and for a brief period under the fourth PPP ministry in 2013, culminating in the dismissal of the provincial government under Aslam Raisani amid rising sectarian violence.

== Powers of Governor ==
Governor is a ceremonial head of the Province appointed by the President on advice of Prime Minister and serves until removed by President on advice of Prime Minister.

Governor is chancellor of public sector universities of province.

Governor appoints cabinet and take oath from elected chief minister and cabinet. He also appoints caretaker Chief Minister and Care Taker Cabinet and take oath from them.

Governor signs bills passed by Provincial Assembly of Balochistan which then become law.

He also signs provincial budget passed by Provincial Assembly.

He can also promulgate ordinances when he is satisfied that Assembly is not in session but only on advice of cabinet.

He is bound to act on advice of cabinet and Chief Minister.

He also took oath from Chief Justice of Balochistan High Court.

He appoints Advocate General of Province on the advice of chief minister.

He appoints Chairman of Balochistan Public Service Commission on advice of Chief Minister.

He appoints Provincial Mohtasib Balochistan.

He can also impose governor rule on the Province after advice from the President and Federal Cabinet but in emergency situations.

He signs notifications and orders promulgated by the cabinet or respective departments.

He can dissolve provincial assembly on the advice of chief minister. He can also dissolve provincial assembly at his discretion when vote of no-confidence has been passed against the Chief Minister, no other member of the Provincial Assembly is likely to command the confidence of the majority of the members of the Provincial Assembly in accordance with the provisions of the Constitution, as ascertained in session of the provincial Assembly summoned for the purpose.

He has the right to address in Provincial Assembly.

He can summon and prorogue the sessions of Provincial Assembly of Balochistan.

When he is satisfied that the chief minister does not command the confidence of the majority of members of the provincial assembly he can ask the chief minister to take a vote of confidence of the majority of members of the assembly. When the chief minister fails to take confidence vote. The governor can remove him and appoint a chief minister who has majority support in the assembly.

== Governor House ==
The seat of the Governor is located at Governor House, Quetta, constructed in 1888 during the British Raj. It was heavily damaged during the 1935 Quetta earthquake, but was repaired by the Viceroy of India, Lord Willingdon.

The Governor House was opened to the public in 2018, by the Pakistan Tehreek-e-Insaf government.

== Government ==
The province was administered by a Chief Commissioner appointed by the Federal Government. Although there was no elected legislature the Chief Commissioner could consult the Shahi Jirga, an assembly of tribal leaders.

The province is composed of three groups of areas – the settled districts, the political agencies, and the tribal area. The settled areas were mainly the districts around Quetta and Jaffarabad. The agencies were the Zhob agency to the north of Quetta and the Chagai agency to the west, which had a tenuous land link with the rest of the province. The tribal areas were the Bugti and Marri tribal agencies which would later become Provincially Administered Tribal Areas in the new Balochistan province.

No.	Chief Commissioner of Balochistan	Tenure
1	Sir Geoffrey Prior	15 August 1947 – 3 October 1947
2	Sir Ambrose Dundas Flux Dundas	3 October 1947 – 8 April 1948
3	Cecil Arthur Grant Savidge	9 April 1948 – 18 January 1949
4	Sahibzada Mohammad Kursheed	19 January 1949 – 16 July 1949
5	Mian Aminuddin	16 July 1949 – 18 November 1952
6	Unknown	18 November 1952 – 13 February 1953
7	Qurban Ali Khan	13 February 1953 – 8 November 1954
8	Sardar Bahadur Khan	8 November 1954 – 19 July 1955
9	R.A.F. Hyride	19 July 1955 – 25 July 1955
10	R.A.M. Shaker	26 July 1955 – 14 October 1955
	Province abolished	14 October 1955

see List of Chief Commissioners of Baluchistan

=== Governors of West Pakistan ===
No.	Governor of West Pakistan	Portrait	Tenure	Party Background	Form of Government
11	Mushtaq Ahmed Gurmani		14 October 1955 – 27 August 1957	Muslim League	Democratic government
12	Akhter Husain		September 1957 – 12 April 1960	Independent	Military government
13	Amir Mohammad Khan		12 April 1960 – 18 September 1966	Muslim League	Military government / Civilian authority
14	General (retired) Muhammad Musa		18 September 1966 – 20 March 1969	Independent	Civilian Authority
15	Yusuf Haroon		20 March 1969 – 25 March 1969	Civilian Government	Civilian Authority
No.	Martial Law Administrator		Tenure Term	Type of Government	Service in effect
16	Lieutenant-General Attiqur Rahman (first term)		25 March 1969 – 29 August 1969	Military Government	Pakistan Army
17	Lieutenant-General Tikka Khan		29 August 1969 – 1 September 1969	Military Government	Pakistan Army
18	Air Marshal Nur Khan		1 September 1969 – 1 February 1970	Military Government	Pakistan Air Force
(16)	Lieutenant-General Attiqur Rahman (second term)		1 February 1970 – 1 July 1970	Military Government	Pakistan Army

== List of governors of Balochistan ==
List of governors of Balochistan
Term	Name	Took office	Left office	Affiliation
1	Riaz Hussain	1 July 1970	25 December 1971	Military
2	Ghous Bakhsh Raisani	26 December 1971	29 April 1972	Pakistan People's Party
3	Ghaus Bakhsh Bizenjo	30 April 1972	14 February 1973	National Awami Party
4	Akbar Bugti	15 February 1973	31 December 1973	Jamhoori Watan Party
5	Ahmad Yar Khan (Khan of Kalat)	1 January 1974	5 July 1977	Independent
6	Khuda Bakhsh Marri	6 July 1977	18 September 1978	Independent
7	Rahimuddin Khan	19 September 1978	21 March 1984	Military
8	F. S. Lodhi	22 March 1984	7 July 1984	Military
9	Khushdil Khan Afridi (K. K. Afridi)	18 November 1984	30 December 1985	Military
10	Musa Khan	30 December 1985	12 March 1991	Independent
11	Gul Mohammad Khan Jogezai	13 July 1991	18 July 1993	Independent
12	Sardar Abdur Rahim Durrani	19 July 1993	18 May 1994	Independent
13	Imran Ullah Khan	19 May 1994	10 April 1997	Pakistan People's Party
14	Miangul Aurangzeb	22 April 1997	17 August 1999	Pakistan Muslim League (Nawaz)
15	Sayed Muhammad Fazal Agha	18 August 1999	12 October 1999	Independent
16	Amir-ul-Mulk Mengal	25 October 1999	31 January 2003	Independent
17	Abdul Qadir Baloch	1 February 2003	10 August 2003	Independent
18	Owais Ahmed Ghani	11 August 2003	5 February 2008	Independent
19	Zulfikar Ali Magsi	28 February 2008	9 June 2013	Pakistan People's Party
20	Muhammad Khan Achakzai	14 June 2013	6 September 2018	Pashtunkhwa Milli Awami Party
21	Amanullah Khan Yasinzai	4 October 2018	7 July 2021	Independent
22	Syed Zahoor Ahmad Agha	9 July 2021	13 April 2022	Pakistan Tehreek-e-Insaf
23	Abdul Wali Kakar	3 March 2023	06 May 2024	Balochistan National Party (Mengal)
24	Sheikh Jaffar Khan Mandokhail	06 May 2024		Pakistan Muslim League (N)

== See also ==
- Chief Minister of Balochistan
- Government of Balochistan
- List of current Pakistani governors
- List of current Pakistani chief ministers
