= Naseer Mengal =

Pakistani politician

- نصیر مینگل

Chief Minister of Balochistan (Acting)
- In office 19 July 1993 – 20 October 1993
- Preceded by: Zulfikar Ali Magsi (as acting chief minister)
- Succeeded by: Zulfiqar Ali Magsi

Personal details
- Born: Mir Muhammad Nasir Mengal Wadh, Khanate of Kalat (modern-day Balochistan, Pakistan)
- Relations: Mengal tribe
- Children: Atta-ur-Rahman; Shafiq-ur-Rahman Mengal

Mir Muhammad Naseer Mengal (Note: Urdu: میر محمد نصیر مینگل) is a Pakistani politician who served as the acting chief minister of Balochistan from 19 July 1993 to 20 October 1993. He was a leading member of the Pakistan Muslim League – Q (PML–Q) in Balochistan.

== Early life and family ==
Mengal was born in the Wadh, Khanate of Kalat (modern-day Balochistan, Pakistan). He hails from the aristocratic Mengal tribe of Brahvis. His family has a longtime rivalry with the family of Attaullah Mengal, his distanced relative.

Mengal had at least two sons, Atta-ur-Rahman Mengal and Shafiq-ur-Rahman Mengal, who is the leader of Jhalawan Awami Panel.

== Political career ==
Mengal was part of the governments of Zia-ul-Haq and Pervez Musharraf. He served as the acting chief minister of Balochistan from 19 July 1993 to 20 October 1993. He also served as Pakistan's acting Minister of State for Petroleum and Natural Resources for a while.

== Notes ==
Political offices
Preceded by Mir Humayun Khan Marri	Chief Minister of Balochistan; 1990 – 1993	Succeeded by Zulfikar Ali Magsi
