= Riaz Hussain (general) =

Pakistani military officer and politician

Lieutenant General Riaz Hussain SK
- ریاض حسین

8th Director-General of Inter-Services Intelligence
- In office October 1959 – May 1966
- Preceded by: Muhammad Hayat
- Succeeded by: Mohammad Akbar Khan

1st Governor of Balochistan
- In office 1 July 1970 – 25 December 1971
- President: General Yahya Khan
- Succeeded by: Ghous Bakhsh Raisani

Sub-Administrator Martial Law Sector No. 5 Zone B
- In office 11 April 1961 – 25 September 1961
- Succeeded by: Desmond Peter

Personal details
- Died: 5 February 1972

Military service
- Branch/service: British Indian Army (1941-1947); Pakistan Army (1947-1971)
- Years of service: 1941-1971
- Rank: Lieutenant General
- Commands: Inter-Services Intelligence
- Battles/wars: India–Pakistan war of 1965

Riaz Hussain (Note: Urdu: ریاض حسین) (died 5 February 1972) was a Pakistani former three-star rank general who served as the eighth Director General of the Inter-Services Intelligence from 1959 to 1966. He served as the first Governor of Balochistan from 1970 to 1971 in the military regime of President General Yahya Khan.

== Early life ==
Riaz Hussain was born into a Kashmiri Muslim family.

== Military career ==
=== British Indian Army (1941-1947) ===
Riaz Hussain was commissioned into the 8th Punjab Regiment of the British Indian Army on 21 December 1941.

=== Pakistan Army (1947-1971) ===
After the Partition of British India in August 1947, Hussain opted for the Pakistan Army.

From January 1960 to December 1962, Brigadier Riaz Hussain served as the Secretary General of the Pakistan Hockey Federation.

Zulfikar Ali Bhutto, who was the Foreign Minister of Pakistan during the India-Pakistan War of 1965, recalled that President Ayub Khan was furious when Pakistani intelligence agencies were unable to locate an Indian Armoured Division. He summoned the Director General Inter-Service Intelligence (ISI), Brigadier Riaz Hussain, to his office in Rawalpindi where Bhutto was also present.

According to Bhutto, "Ayub Khan gave hell to Riaz Hussain" and told him that Military Intelligence had let down the country. Bhutto also told Hussain that the Armoured Division was not a needle in a haystack. Bhutto wrote that with an injured tone of voice, Ayub said: "It is a monster and not a needle!" He continued pressing Brigadier Riaz Hussain to explain to him what had gone wrong with the intelligence agencies. Bhutto further wrote: "With a quivering voice, Brigadier Riaz Hussain replied, Sir, from June 1964, Military Intelligence has, been given political assignments on elections and post-election repercussions."

In May 1966, British intelligence reported on changes in the high command of the Pakistan Army and mentioned Hussain's departure as the Director of the Inter-Services Intelligence.

==== Governor of Balochistan (1970-1971) ====
Riaz Hussain was appointed as the first Governor of Balochistan on 1 July 1970. He served until 25 December 1971.

Pakistani politician Sherbaz Khan Mazari, who was a friend of Hussain, attended the swearing-in ceremony and later wrote in his biography, "A Journey to Disillusionment": "Riaz Hussain was a good human being and his uniform and new elevated status did not detract from his fine personal qualities."

== Death ==
Riaz Hussain died on 5 February 1972.

== Notes ==
Political offices
Preceded by Office Established	Governor of Balochistan	Succeeded by Ghous Bakhsh Raisani
