= Akhtar Mengal =

Pakistani politician (born 1962)

Sardar Akhtar Mengal
- اختر مینگل
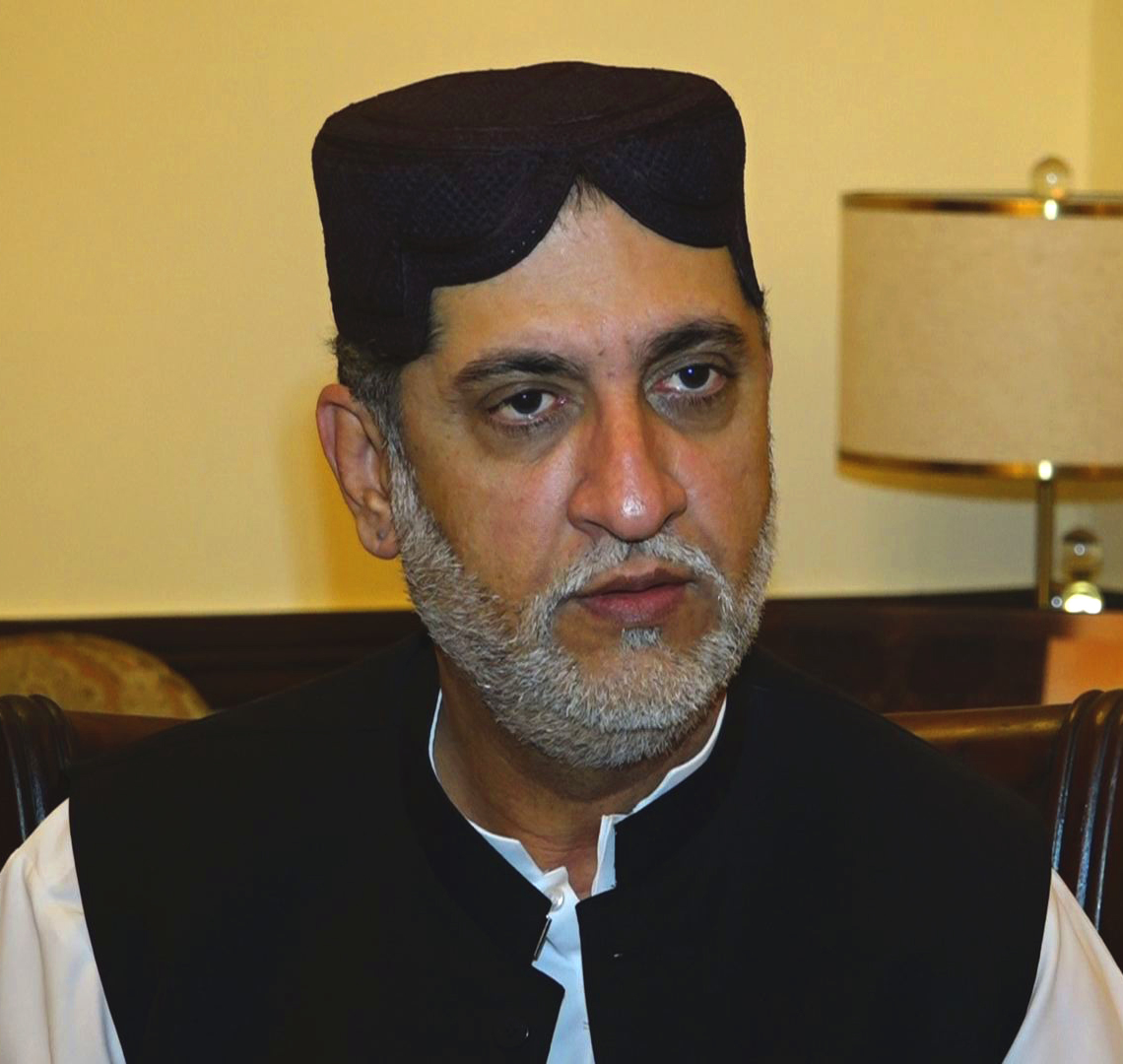

9th Chief Minister of Balochistan
- In office 22 February 1997 – 15 June 1998
- Preceded by: Zulfikar Ali Magsi
- Succeeded by: Jan Mohammad Jamali

Member of the National Assembly of Pakistan
- In office 29 February 2024 – 14 September 2024 (Note: Resignation accepted on 11 February 2026.)
- Constituency: NA-256 Khuzdar
- In office 13 August 2018 – 10 August 2023
- Constituency: NA-269 (Khuzdar)

Member of the Provincial Assembly of Balochistan
- In office 2013–2018
- Constituency: PB-37 Khuzdar
- In office 2008–2013
- Constituency: PB-35 Khuzdar
- In office 2002–2007
- Constituency: PB-38 Khuzdar
- In office 1997–1999
- Constituency: PB-38 Khuzdar
- In office 1993–1996
- Constituency: PB-27 Khuzdar
- In office 1990–1993
- Constituency: PB-27 Khuzdar

Personal details
- Born: 6 October 1962 (age 63) Wadh, Khuzdar, Balochistan
- Party: BNP(M) (1996-present)
- Children: 3 Including Gurgain Mengal
- Parent: Ataullah Mengal (father)

Akhtar Mengal (Urdu: اختر مینگل; born 6 October 1962) is a Pakistani politician from Balochistan who is the chairman of Balochistan National Party (Mengal). He is also serving as a member of the National Assembly of Pakistan since February 2024. He previously served as the Chief Minister of Balochistan between 1997 and 1998 and later as a member of the Balochistan Provincial Assembly. Mengal also served as a member of National Assembly of Pakistan from August 2018 till August 2023.

== Early life and education ==
Mengal was born on 6 October 1962 in Wadh, West Pakistan (now, Balochistan, Pakistan) to the former Chief Minister of Balochistan Ataullah Mengal. He is from the Mengal tribe. Mengal has two sons, Gurgain Mengal, Brahem Mengal and a daughter, Banari Mengal.

He was educated at the Aitchison College.

== Political career ==
Mengal returned to Pakistan on 25 March 2013 after ending four years of self exile in Dubai to participate in the 2013 general elections. His party only has two seats in the 51-member provincial assembly. One held by Mengal and the other by Hamal Kalmati, who represents Gwadar. Two candidates of the BNP, Esa Noori and Raouf Mengal, won National Assembly seats from the Makran coastal region and Khuzdar, respectively. Akhtar Mengal took oath as a member of National Assembly of Pakistan on 13 August 2018.

=== Arrest and release ===
Akhtar Mengal was arrested in September 2006, along with around 700 other political workers, in a government crackdown in Balochistan. He was held because he was planning a long march against President Pervez Musharraf's military rule. Mengal was released on May 9, 2008 and all charges against him were dropped by the Government of Sindh. The Balochistan government withdrew all cases, including those of sedition, against Mengal.

On 25 March 2013, Mengal returned to Pakistan from Dubai to take part in the general elections on 11 May 2013.

On 3 September 2024 Mengal handed his resignation from the National Assembly of Pakistan citing the deteriorating situation in Balochistan. He was arrested on 24 October 2024, for protest against reforms.

=== Relationship with the Baloch insurgency ===
Akhtar Mengal has been historically criticised by the Baloch insurgents as well as the security establishment. In an interview in 2013, he lamented that, “The Baloch militants consider me a traitor while the security establishment also treats me as an enemy." He is an elder of various such influential families who have their members on both sides of the political divide. Currently a part of the Pakistan Democratic Movement (a 13-party coalition currently in power at the federal level), the association of his brother and nephews with the Balochistan Liberation Army has long been an obstacle to his entry into the mainstream national politics. Javed Mengal (brother) and Nooruddin Mengal and Bhawal Mengal (nephews) have allegedly been involved in armed militancy in the restive province of Balochistan. However, Akhtar Mengal has condemned the insurgents and publicly called for a political solution to the myriad problems in the province.

On 2 September 2025, Mengal escaped a suicide bombing on a BNP rally that he attended in Quetta that left 15 people dead and was claimed by Islamic State.
