= Chief minister (Pakistan) =

Head of government of a province in Pakistan

A chief minister (Urdu: وزیر اعلى—Wazīr-e Aʿlá lit. 'High Vizier'), is the head of the provincial government. Executive authority of a province is vested in the chief minister and his chosen cabinet, despite the governor serving as the nominal head of provincial executive. The chief minister, according to article 131 of the 1973 constitution, shall keep the governor informed on matters relating to provincial government. Moreover, all executive actions of the provincial government shall be expressed to be taken in the name of governor according to article 139. The chief minister is invariably the leader of the party or the coalition with a majority in the provincial assembly, the provincial legislature of which he is the leader.

The parliamentary system in Pakistan follows the Westminster system. Hence the ministers of the provinces are elected by the members of the legislature, and the majority party is invited to elect a leader, whose tenure lasts for five years. The people do not elect the head of the government, rather they elect their representatives only. In turn their representatives select the head of the government. The head of the government, once elected, enjoys almost exclusive executive powers.

== Selection process ==
=== Eligibility ===
The Constitution of Pakistan sets the principle qualifications one must meet to be eligible to the office of the Chief Minister. A Chief Minister must be:

- a citizen of Pakistan
- should be a member of the provincial legislature.

The chief minister is elected through a majority in the provincial legislative assembly. This is procedurally established by the vote of confidence in the legislative assembly, as suggested by the majority party who is the appointing authority.

=== Oath ===
After the successful elections, the swearing is done before the governor of the province. The oath of office, according to the "Articles [2] 130(5) and 132(2)" of the constitution is as follows.

(In the name of Allah, the most Beneficent, the most Merciful.)

I, ____________, do solemnly swear that I will bear true faith and allegiance to Pakistan:

- That, as a Chief Minister (or Minister) of the Government of the Province of ____________, I will discharge my duties, and perform my functions, honestly, to the best of my ability, faithfully in accordance with the Constitution of the Islamic Republic of Pakistan and the law, and always in the interest of the sovereignty, integrity, solidarity, well- being and prosperity of Pakistan:
- That I will strive to preserve the Islamic Ideology which is the basis for the creation of Pakistan:
- That I will not allow my personal interest to influence my official conduct or my official decisions:
- That I will preserve, protect and defend the Constitution of the Islamic Republic of Pakistan:
- That, in all circumstances, I will do right to all manner of people, according to law, without fear or favor, affection or ill- will:
- And that I will not directly or indirectly communicate or reveal to any person any matter which shall be brought under my consideration or shall become known to me as Chief Minister (or Minister) except as may be required for the due discharge of my duties as Chief Minister (or Minister) or as may be specially permitted by the Chief Minister.

May Allah Almighty help and guide me (A'meen).

=== Succession ===
The Governor may ask the Chief Minister to continue to hold office until his successor enters upon the office of Chief Minister. The Chief Minister shall continue to hold office until his successor enters upon the office of Chief Minister. After the dissolution of the provincial assembly, nothing in Article 131 or Article 132 can be construed to disqualify the Chief Minister or a Provincial Minister from continuing in the office.

== Current chief ministers of Pakistan ==
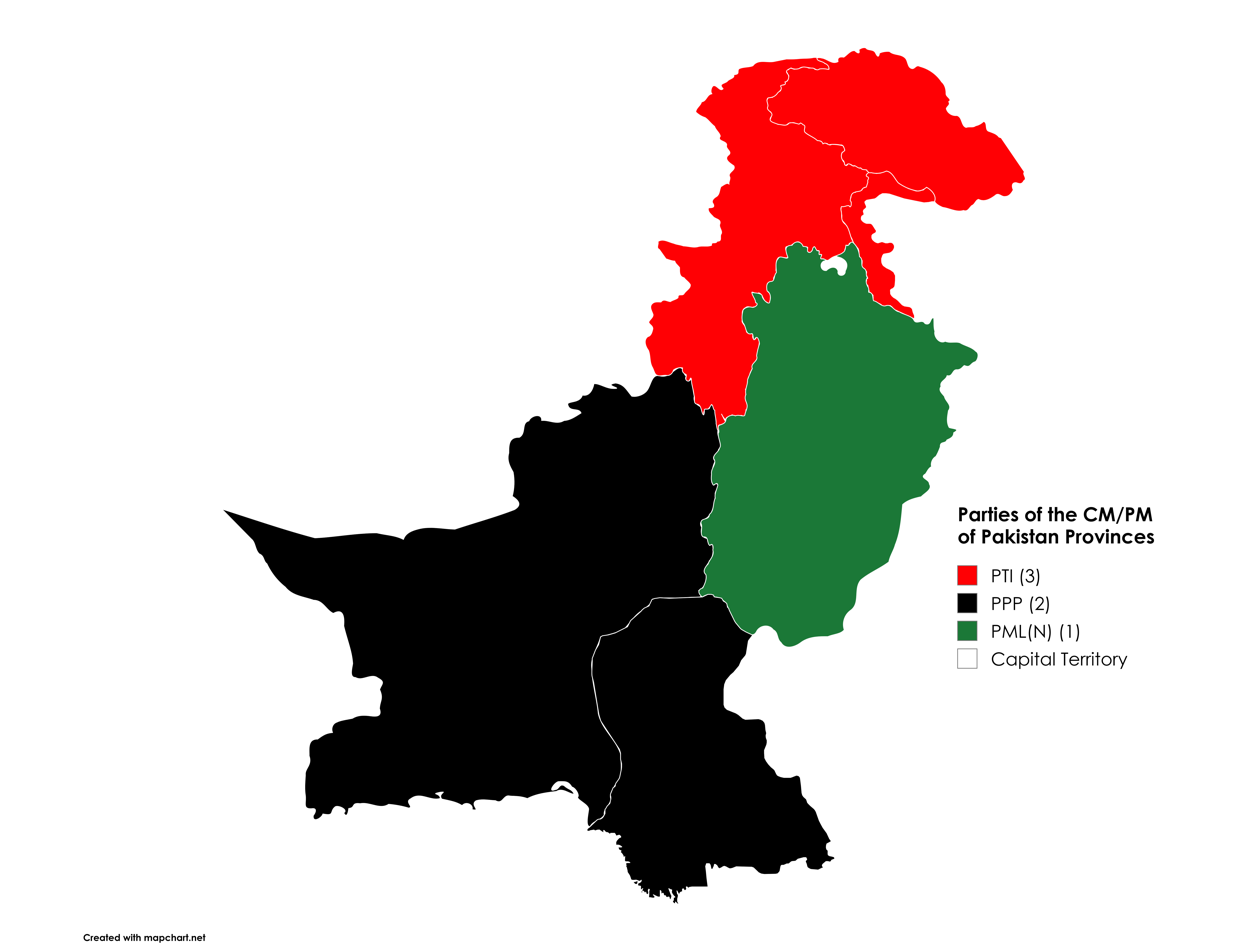
Map shows the parties of the Chief Ministers and Prime Minister of Pakistan Provinces

The table below lists the currently serving chief ministers and heads of administrative units (AUs) of Pakistan as of October 2024.

Province	Chief minister	Government	Ref
Balochistan (list)	Sarfraz Bugti	PPP	
Khyber Pakhtunkhwa (list)	Governor's Rule		
Punjab (list)	Maryam Nawaz	PMLN	
Sindh (list)	Murad Ali Shah	PPP	
Gilgit-Baltistan (list)	Amjad Hussain Azar	PPP	

=== Current Prime Minister of Azad Jammu Kashmir ===
Province	Prime Minister	Portrait	Took office (tenure length)	Party	Ref
Azad Jammu and Kashmir (list)	Chaudhry Anwarul Haq		20 April 2023 (3 years, 182 days)	IND	

== See also ==
- List of current Pakistani governors
