= Prince Ahmed Umer Ahmedzai =

Pakistani politician

Prince Omar Ahmadzai Kalat

Member of the Senate of Pakistan
- Incumbent
- Assumed office March 2021
- Constituency: Balochistan

Personal details
- Party: BAP (2021-present)

Prince Ahmed Omar Ahmadzai (Urdu: پرنس احمد عمر زئی) is a Pakistani Politician from the Khan of Kalat family, son of the 34th Khan of Kalat, His Highness Mir Dawood Khan Ahmedzai, and brother of the current 35th Khan of Kalat His Highness Mir Suleman Dawood Jan.

Prince Ahmed Omar Ahmadzai is currently serving as a member of the Senate of Pakistan from Balochistan since March 2021, and Chairman of the Senate of Pakistan Standing Committee on Communications. He represents Balochistan Awami Party (BAP). He is the Chairman and Founder of Balochistan International Squash League (BISL) since 2017.
