= Rauf Mengal =

Pakistani politician

Abdul Rauf Mengal

Member of the National Assembly of Pakistan
- In office 2002–2006

Personal details
- Other political affiliations: Balochistan National Party

Abdul Rauf Mengal is a Pakistani politician who served as a member of the National Assembly of Pakistan from 2002 until his resignation in 2006.

After the assassination of the Sunni religious leader Azam Tariq in 2003, Mengal accused the Pakistan's intelligence agencies of collusion in the murder, including the Inter-Services Intelligence (ISI) and the Military Intelligence (MI).
