= Abdullah Magsi =

Pakistani historian (1947–1993)

Abdullah Magsi Sindhi: عبدالله مگسي
- Born: Abdullah Khan; 17 December 1947; Village Gul Muhammad Magsi Dadu Sindh, Pakistan
- Died: 1 April 1993 (aged 45); Karachi Pakistan
- Occupation: Author
- Writing career
- Subject: History
- Notable work: Sindh Ji Tareekh Jo Jadeed Mutalio
- Movement: Progressive

Abdullah Magsi (Urdu:عبدالله مگسی) (Sindhi: عبدالله مگسي) (b. 17 December 1947, d.1 April 1993) was a Pakistani author and professor from the Sindh province of Pakistan.

== Early life ==
Abdullah Magsi was born to Dhani Bux Magsi on 17 December 1947, at the village Gul Muhammad Magsi, Dadu District, Sindh. Through Sindh Public Service Commission, he was appointed lecturer in Political Science and was promoted to a professor.

== Contribution ==
He wrote many articles about the history of Sindh. His book Sindh Ji Tareekh Jo Jadeed Mutalio is his prominent work. Abdullah Magsi mostly wrote about the neglected and unexplored heritage of the Dadu District.

== Death ==
Magsi died on 1 April 1993.
