= Sheikh Jaffar Khan Mandokhail =

Pakistani politician

- شیخ جعفر خان مندوخیل
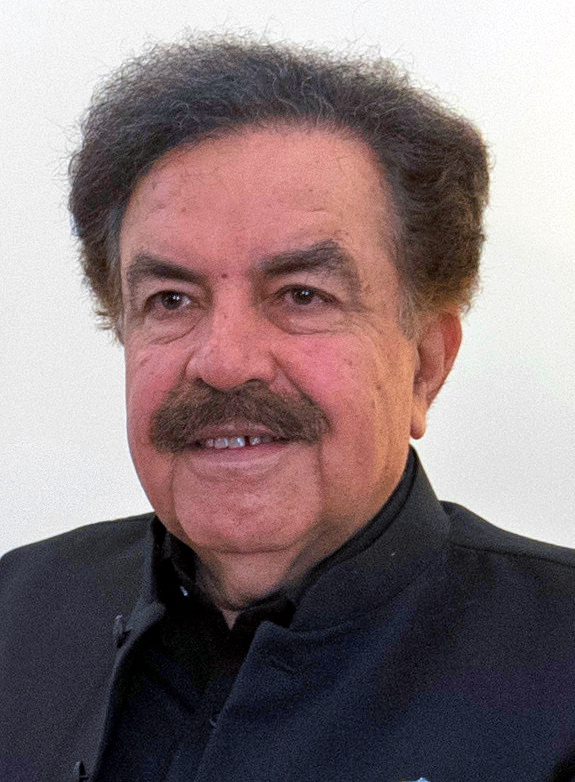

24th Governor of Balochistan
- Incumbent
- Assumed office 6 May 2024
- President: Asif Ali Zardari
- Prime Minister: Shehbaz Sharif
- Chief Minister: Sarfraz Bugti
- Preceded by: Abdul Wali Kakar

Member of the Provincial Assembly of Balochistan
- In office 2013–2018
- Constituency: PB-19 (Zhob)
- In office 2008–2013
- Constituency: PB-19 (Zhob)
- In office 2002–2007
- Constituency: PB-19 (Zhob-2)
- In office 1997–1999
- Constituency: PB-14 (Zhob)
- In office 1993–1996
- Constituency: PB-14 (Zhob)
- In office 1990–1993
- Constituency: PB-14 (Zhob)

Personal details
- Born: 26 December 1956 (age 69) Zhob District, Balochistan, Pakistan
- Party: PMLN (2022-present)
- Other political affiliations: PML(Q) (2002-2022); IJI (1998-1990)
- Relations: Humayun Khan Mandokhel (brother)

Sheikh Jaffar Khan Mandokhail is a Pakistani politician who is currently serving as the 24th Governor of Balochistan, in office since 6 May 2024.

Previously, he has served multiple terms as a member of the Provincial Assembly of Balochistan. His tenures include periods from 1990 to 1993, 1993 to 1996, 1997 to 1999, 2002 to 2007, 2008 to 2013, and 2013 to 2018. During his time in office, he occupied various ministerial positions, including roles in Education, Finance, and the Home Ministry.

== Early life and education ==
Mandokhail was born on 26 December 1956 in Zhob District, Balochistan.

He graduated from St. Francis' Grammar School and obtained his master's degree from University of Balochistan.

== Political career ==
Mandokhail began his political journey in 1974 through student politics and served as the president of the Muslim Student Federation (MSF).

He contested for the seat of the Provincial Assembly of Balochistan from Constituency PB-14 (Zhob-2) as a candidate of Islami Jamhoori Ittehad (IJI) in the 1988 Pakistani general election. However, he did not succeed in securing the seat. He garnered 2,876 votes but lost the seat to Maulvi Muhammad Ishaq of Jamiat Ulema-e-Islam (F) (JUI-F),), who secured 2,994 votes.

He was elected to the Provincial Assembly of Balochistan as a candidate of IJI from Constituency PB-14 (Zhob) for the first time in the 1990 Pakistani general election. He garnered 5,532 votes, prevailing over Muhammad Khan Sherani of JUI-F, who received 5,325 vote. During his tenure as a member of the Balochistan Assembly, he served as the Provincial Minister of Balochistan for Education from 1990 to 1993.

In the 1993 Pakistani general election, he was re-elected to the Provincial Assembly of Balochistan as a candidate of Pakistan Muslim League (N) (PML-N) from Constituency PB-14 (Zhob). He received 6,898 votes and defeated Muhammad Ibrahim Sherani of NDA who securd 3,882 votes. During his tenure as a member of the Balochistan Assembly, he served as the Provincial Minister of Balochistan for Finance from 1993 to 1996.

He was re-elected to the Provincial Assembly of Balochistan as a candidate of PML-N from Constituency PB-14 (Zhob) in the 1997 Pakistani general election. He garnered 4,828 votes and defeated Haji Muhammad Hassan Shirani of Jamiat Ulema-e-Islam (F) (JUI-F), who received 4,005 vote. In the same election, he also contested the seat of the National Assembly of Pakistan as a candidate of PML-N from Constituency NA-200 (Zhob-cum-Killa Saifullah) but was unsuccessful. He garnered 4,249 votes and lost the seat to Muhammad Khan Sherani of JUI-F, who secured 14,679 votes. During his tenure as a member of the Balochistan Assembly, he served as the Provincial Home Minister of Balochistan from 1997 to 1997.

He was re-elected to the Provincial Assembly of Balochistan as an independent candidate from Constituency PB-19 (Zhob-2) in the 2002 Pakistani general election. He garnered 6,082 votes, prevailing over Malik Sheikh Muhammad Yar Khan of the Awami National Party (ANP), who received 4,073 votes. The same year, he quit PML-N and joined Pakistan Muslim League (Q) (PML-Q).

In the 2008 Pakistani general election, he secured a seat in the Provincial Assembly of Balochistan as a candidate of PML-Q from Constituency PB-19 (Zhob). With 6,104 votes, he emerged victorious, defeating Malik Sheikh Muhammad Yar Khan of the ANP, who received 4,626 votes. In the same election, he contested for the seat of the National Assembly as a candidate of PML-Q from constituency NA-264 (Zhob-cum-Sherani-cum-Killa Saifullah) but was unsuccessful. He received 10,951 votes and was defeated by an independent candidate, Asmatullah, who secured 24,204 votes.

He was re-elected to the Provincial Assembly of Balochistan as a candidate of PML-Q from Constituency PB-19 (Zhob) in the 2013 Pakistani general election. He received 5,591 votes, surpassing Sheikh Ayaz Khan Mandokhail of JUI-F, who received 4,221 votes. In the same election, he ran for a seat in the National Assembly from Constituency NA-264 (Zhob-cum-Sherani-cum-Killa Saifullah) as a candidate of PML-Q, but faced defeat with only 2,824 votes. The seat was won by Muhammad Khan Sherani of JUI-F who received 30,870 votes. During his tenure as a member of the Balochistan Assembly, he managed the responsibilities of three provincial government departments, including the Board of Revenue, Excise and Taxation, and Transport.

In the 2018 Pakistani general election, he contested for the Provincial Assembly of Balochistan seat as a candidate of PML-Q from Constituency PB-2 (Zhob) but was unsuccessful. He garnered 8,501 votes and was defeated by an independent candidate Mitha Khan Kakar who received 16,338 votes.

In October 2022, he quit PML-Q and re-joined PML-N. In February 2023, PML-N President and then Prime Minister of Pakistan Shehbaz Sharif appointed Mandokhail as the President of PML-N Balochistan.

=== Governor of Balochistan ===
In the 2024 Pakistani general election, he contested for the Provincial Assembly of Balochistan seat as a candidate of PML-N from Constituency PB-2 (Zhob) but was unsuccessful. He garnered 6,565 votes and was defeated by Fazal Qadir Mandokhail of JUI-F, who received 11,453 votes.

After the election, Pakistan People's Party (PPP) and PML-N struck a power-sharing deal to establish a coalition government as none of the parties secured a simple majority. As per the agreement between PPP and PML-N, the two parties also agreed to establish a coalition government in Balochistan. Under this arrangement, PPP secured the chief minister's position, while PML-N was allocated the governorship of the province.

On 3 May 2024, PML-N put forward Mandokhail as their nominee for the position of Governor of Balochistan. On 4 May, President Asif Ali Zardari approved the appointment of Mandokhel as the Balochistan governor. On 6 May, he took the oath of office as 24th Governor of Balochistan.
