= Shama Parveen Magsi =

Pakistani politician

Shama Parveen Magsi (Urdu: شمع پروین مگسی; born March 15, 1950) is a politician from Balochistan, Pakistan.

== Life ==
Magsi was elected to Provincial Assembly of Balochistan and was appointed as Minister of Information Technology, Provincial Coordination on NGOs Program (National / International) and Universities. Shama Parveen Magsi is married to Nawab Zulfikar Ali Magsi former Chief Minister of Balochistan. Prince Abdul Karim Khan was her father. She earned her BA degree (recently declared bogus and fake by the university (Dawn News)).

== See also ==
- Nawab Zulfikar Ali Magsi
