= Ghous Bakhsh Raisani =

Pakistani politician

Nawab Ghous Bakhsh Raisani
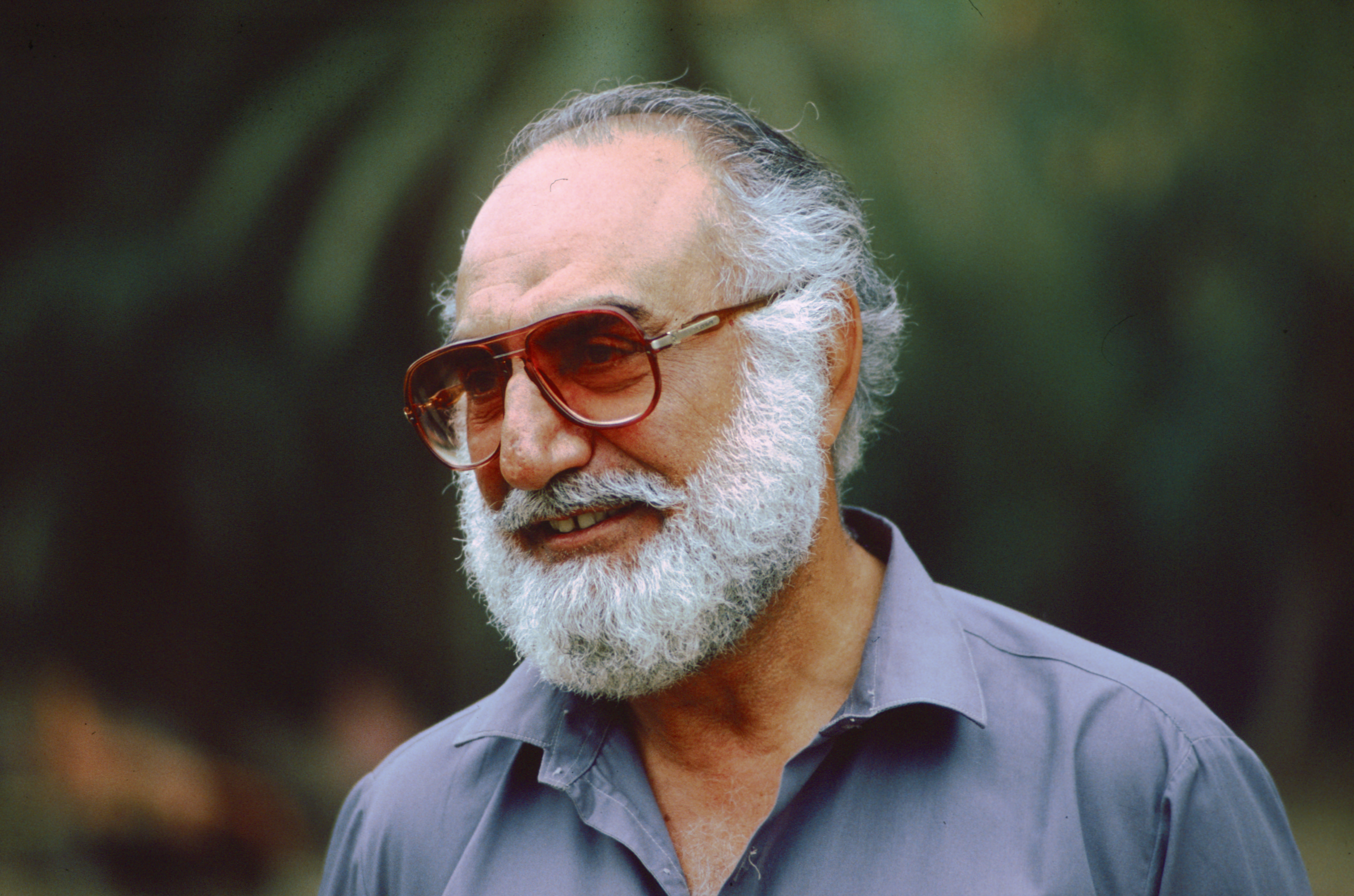
- Raisani in Mehrgarh, February 1987

2nd Governor of Balochistan
- In office 26 December 1971 – 19 April 1972
- Preceded by: Riaz Hussain
- Succeeded by: Ghaus Bakhsh Bizenjo

Personal details
- Born: 6 September 1924 Kanak, Kalat State, British India (present-day Kanak, Balochistan, Pakistan)
- Died: 26 May 1987 (aged 62) Mehrgarh, Balochistan, Pakistan
- Party: Pakistan People's Party

Nawab Mir Ghous Bakhsh Khan Raisani (6 September 1924 – 26 May 1987) was a Pakistani politician who served as the first Civilian governor of Balochistan from 26 December 1971 to 29 April 1972. He was also a federal minister for Food and Agriculture and the provincial president of the Pakistan Peoples Party.

== Biography ==
Raisani was born on September 6, 1924, in Kanak, Khuzdar District, Kalat State. Son of late Nawab Bahadur Sir Asadullah Khan Raisani. He studied in the famous Colonel Brown Cambridge School, Dehradun. The school is well known for its discipline throughout India. In his Early day he served as a major in British Army during British Raj He was later appointed as the chief of Sarawan, the Tumandar of all tribes in the Sarawan region upon the death of his father Late Nawab Bahadur Sir Asadullah Khan Raisani. He was the father of Aminullah Khan Raisani, Asadullah Khan Raisani, Aslam Khan Raisani, Abdul Nabi Khan Raisani, Lashkari Khan Raisani, Ismail Khan Raisani, Siraj Khan Raisani, Umar Khan Raisani, Nauroze Khan Raisani.

== Death ==
He was assassinated in 1987 along with his four bodyguards in Mehrgarh area of Kachhi District.
