= Jhal Magsi District =

District in Balochistan, Pakistan

Coordinates: 28°30′N 67°30′E

Jhal Magsi District ضلع جھل مگسی جهل مگسی دمگ
- District of Balochistan
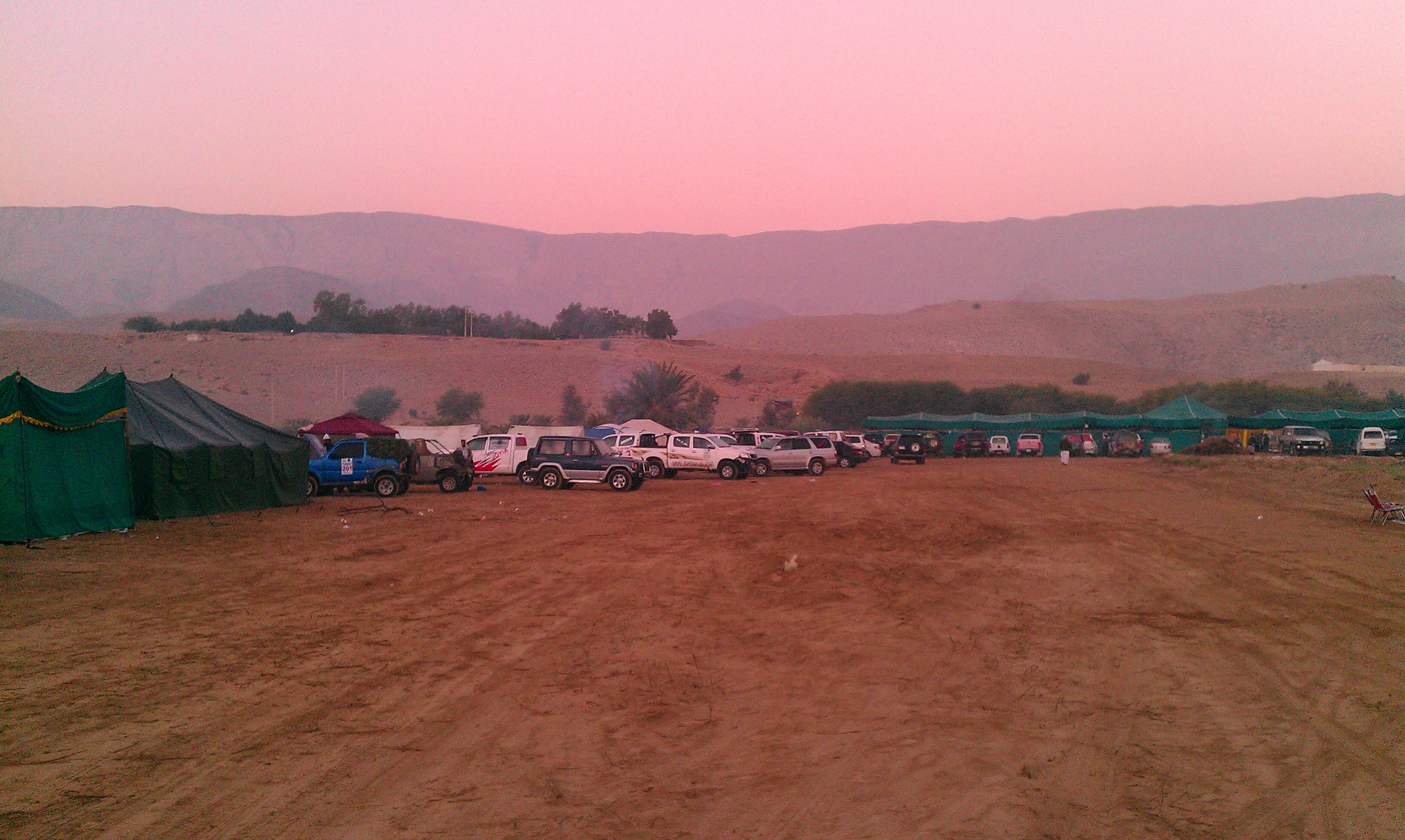
- Panorama of Jhal Magsi

- Map of Balochistan with Jhal Magsi District highlighted
- Country: Pakistan
- Province: Balochistan
- Division: Nasirabad
- Headquarters: Gandawah

Government
  - Type: District Administration
  - Deputy Commissioner: Syed Rahmatullah
  - District Police Officer: N/A
  - District Health Officer: Dr Ali Magsi

Area
  - District of Balochistan: 3,615 km^{2} (1,396 sq mi)

Population (2023)
  - District of Balochistan: 203,368
  - Density: 56.3/km^{2} (146/sq mi)
  - Urban: 24,130
  - Rural: 179,238

Literacy
  - Literacy rate: Total: (30.14%); Male: (37.89%); Female: (22.09%)
- Time zone: UTC+5 (PST)
- Number of Tehsils: 2

Jhal Magsi District (Urdu: ضلع جھل مگسی) is a district in the central part of the Balochistan province in Pakistan. It is an area that was previously part of Kachhi District, it was established as a district of its own in December 1991 and after a brief period in which it was known as Kachhi (the remainder of the old Kachhi district being renamed to Bolan), its name was changed to Jhal Magsi in May 1992. The district is named after the town of Jhal, seat of the Magsi tribe.

The district has two main towns, Gandawah, the administrative centre and Jhal Magsi; and is divided into two subdivisions: Gandawah and Jhal Magsi. The City is also known for ancient places and tourist attractions like Peer Chattal Shah Noorani, Taj Mahal of Balochistan (Moti Gohram Tomb), Moola River, Peer Lakha, Sunth Moola (tail of Moola River), Kashook Valley and more.

== Demographics ==
Historical population
Year	Pop.	±% p.a.
1951	...	—
1961	53,031	—
1972	75,261	+3.23%
1981	68,092	−1.11%
1998	109,941	+2.86%
2017	148,900	+1.61%
2023	203,368	+5.33%

=== Population ===
As of the 2023 census, Jhal Magsi district has 30,953 households and a population of 203,368. The district has a sex ratio of 103.49 males to 100 females and a literacy rate of 30.14%: 37.89% for males and 22.09% for females. 73,676 (36.23% of the surveyed population) are under 10 years of age. 24,130 (11.87%) live in urban areas.

=== Religion ===
Religions in Jhal Magsi district (2023)
Religion	Percent
Islam	99.1%
Hinduism	0.62%
Other or not stated	0.28%

Religions in present-day Jhal Magsi district
Religion	2017		2023	
Religion	Pop.	%	Pop.	%
Islam	147,700	99.19%	201,535	99.10%
Hinduism	1,196	0.80%	1,252	0.62%
Others	4	0.01%	581	0.28%
Total Population	148,900	100%	203,368	100%

=== Language ===
Languages of Jhal Magsi district (2023)
1. Balochi (75.4%)
2. Sindhi (16.3%)
3. Saraiki (5.76%)
4. Brahui (2.09%)
5. Others (0.39%)

At the time of the 2023 census, 75.43% of the population spoke Balochi, 16.33% Sindhi, 5.76% Saraiki and 2.09% Brahui as their first language.

== Administrative divisions ==
Jhal Magsi District is administratively divided into two tehsils:

It had nine Union Council in 2012, but last year four Union Council were added by the Local Government Department at recommendation of Deputy Commissioner/Delimitation Officer. Namely, the union councils of Jhal Magsi District are as under:

Tehsil	Area (km²)	Pop. (2023)	Density (ppl/km²) (2023)	Literacy rate (2023)	Union Councils
Gandavah Tehsil	1,344	71,230	53.00	36.35%	Union Council Gandawah; Union Council Khari; Union Council Patri
Jhal Magsi Tehsil	1,679	116,528	69.40	26.82%	Union Council Jhal Magsi; Union Council Hathiari; Union Council Panjuk; Union Council Kot Magsi; Union Council Barija; Union Council Mat Sindhur; Union Council Safrani; Union Council Saifabad; Union Council Akbarabad
Mirpur Tehsil	592	15,610	26.37	24.86%	Union Council Mirpur

== Education ==
According to the Pakistan District Education Rankings 2017, district Jhal Magsi is ranked at number 108 out of the 141 ranked districts in Pakistan on the education score index. This index considers learning, gender parity and retention in the district.

Literacy rate in 2014–15 of population 10 years and older in the district stood at 25% whereas for females it was only 11%.

Post primary access is a major issue in the district with 84% schools being at primary level. Compare this with high schools which constitute only 5% of government schools in the district. This is also reflected in the enrolment figures with 7,553 students enrolled in class 1 to 5 and only 118 students enrolled in class 9 and 10.

Gender disparity is another issue in the district. Only 33% schools in the district are girls’ schools. Access to education for girls is a major issue in the district and is also reflected in the low literacy rates for females.

Moreover, the schools in the district lack basic facilities. According to Alif Ailaan Pakistan District Education Rankings 2017, the district is ranked at number 142 out of the 155 districts of Pakistan for primary school infrastructure. At the middle school level, it is ranked at number 141 out of the 155 districts. These rankings take into account the basic facilities available in schools including drinking water, working toilet, availability of electricity, existence of a boundary wall and general building condition. More than 200 out of the 301 government schools in the district do not have electricity, toilet and a boundary wall. 139 schools do not have clean drinking water.

The main issues reported in Taleem Do! App for the district is the unavailability of teachers in schools.

== Bibliography ==
- 1998 District census report of Jhal Magsi. Census publication. Vol. 72. Islamabad: Population Census Organization, Statistics Division, Government of Pakistan. 2000.
