= Jhal Magsi =

Jhal Magsi جھل مگسی
- Town
- Location within Balochistan, Pakistan Location within Pakistan
- Coordinates: 28°17′6″N 67°27′16″E
- Country: Pakistan
- Province: Balochistan
- Division: Nasirabad
- District: Jhal Magsi
- Elevation: 72 m (236 ft)
- Time zone: UTC+5 (PST)

Jhal Magsi (Urdu and Balochi: جھل مگسی) is a town in Jhal Magsi District, Balochistan, Pakistan. It is a purely baloch area and was part of the Kalat native state during the colonial period.

The town is the headquarters of the Ehltiazzai, Magsi and Lashari tribe, the major tribes within the district. Historically, the Magsis are a Baloch ethnicity who migrated from iran with other Baloch tribes like Rind and Lashar and they are called magsi due to the city they belonged Magas in lishar iran. The present leader (sardar) of the Magsi tribe is Zulfqar Ali Khan Magsi, former chief minister of Balochistan And Sardar of Lashari tribe is Sardar Jalal Khan Lashari. A desert car rally is arranged every year as Jhal Magsi Desert Race. The racers participate from all over the Pakistan. Many foreign drivers also participate in the event. The City is also known for ancient places and tourist attractions like Peer Chattal Shah Noorani, Taj Mahal of Balochistan (Moti, Gohram Lashari Tomb) Moti was wife of mir Gohram Lashari, Moola River, Peer Lakha and more.

== Jhal Magsi Desert Challenge ==
The Jhal Magsi Desert Challenge, established in 2005, is an annual off-road motorsport event held in the Jhal Magsi District of Balochistan, Pakistan. The rally typically lasts for several days, beginning with reconnaissance and qualifying rounds, followed by competitive stages divided into various categories. These categories include Prepared A, B, C, and D; Stock A, B, C, and D; as well as Women and Veteran classes. The track length varies each year, with courses extending up to 230 kilometers.
