= Aslam Raisani =

Pakistani politician

Muhammad Aslam Khan Raisani

13th Chief Minister of Balochistan
- In office 9 April 2008 – 14 January 2013
- Preceded by: Jam Mohammad Yousaf
- Succeeded by: Governor's Rule; Abdul Malik Baloch

Member of the Provincial Assembly of Balochistan
- Incumbent
- Assumed office 2024
- Constituency: PB-37 Mastung
- In office 2018–2023
- Constituency: PB-35 Mastung
- In office 2008–2013
- Constituency: PB-38 Mastung
- In office 2002–2007
- Constituency: PB-38 Mastung
- In office 1990–1993
- Constituency: PB-27 Kalat
- In office 1988–1990
- Constituency: PB-27 Kalat

Personal details
- Born: 5 July 1955 (age 71) Sarawan, Balochistan, Pakistan
- Party: JUI (F) (2021-present)
- Other political affiliations: IND (2015-2021); PPP (1999-2013); IND (1993-1999); NP (1988-1993)
- Profession: Tumandar of Raisani Tribe, politician, chief of Sarawan

Muhammad Aslam Khan Raisani (Urdu: نواب محمد اسلم خان رئیسانی) (born 5 July 1955 in Sarawan, Balochistan) is a four times elected member of the Provincial Assembly of Balochistan who served as the Chief Minister of Balochistan from 9 April 2008 until 14 January 2013.

== Family ==
Raisani is the Nawab translated as king of the Raisani tribe of the Sarawan area, succeeding, as eldest son, to the late Nawab Ghous Baksh Khan Raisani.

== Business career ==
He maintains an interest in developing his own landed estates and is President of the Chamber of Agriculture in Balochistan. He also has an interest in preserving wildlife and is a lifetime member of the Wildlife Conservation Society. With assets worth 21 billion rupees, he is the richest parliamentarian of Balouchistan, and among the wealthiest of Pakistanis.

== Political career ==
Raisani began his political career with the Pakistani National Party. In 1989, he was first elected to the Provincial Assembly of Balochistan. He was a member of the Provincial Assembly until 1990, when the provincial assemblies and National Assembly of Pakistan were dissolved by then President of Pakistan Ghulam Ishaq Khan.

When elections were held in 1990, Raisani was again elected to the Provincial Assembly, on the National Party ticket. In 1999, he joined the Pakistan Peoples Party and has remained a member since. In 1999, he was elected for the third time. In the general elections of 2008, he was elected for the fourth time, from the constituency of Mastung/Quetta (PB-38) and became the parliamentary leader in the assembly.

On 9 April 2008, Raisani was elected as the Chief Minister of Baluchistan, running unopposed. On 14 January 2013, upon the imposition of Governor's Rule following the January 2013 Pakistan bombings, Raisani was dismissed as Chief Minister by the Prime Minister of Pakistan, under Article 234 of the Constitution of Pakistan.

On Thursday 1 November 2012, media reports claimed that Raisani party's membership had been cancelled by the Peoples Party Kalat Division, for continually violating party policies. However, he denied these reports, and said that his party membership had not been cancelled.

== Controversy ==
In mid-2010, Raisani stated that he holds a master's degree in political science. When questioned by reporters investigating false claims of educational credentials in Pakistani politics, he stated, "A degree is a degree! Whether fake or genuine, it's a degree! It makes no difference!". Subsequently, in the same year, he rejected allegations of corruption against him by asserting that there was "nothing wrong" with corruption.

Since September 2012, there has been an increasing outcry against Raisani, following his government's failure to maintain law and order in Baluchistan, resulting in the mass murder of the Shia Hazaras community there

There have been numerous instances of people disappearing in Baluchistan and never returning. Many people have accused the government of doing nothing in missing-persons cases with a majority of cases being left unsolved, and people have accused federal agencies of Pakistan of being involved with the Government of Baluchistan in the abduction of suspected separatist militants.

In January 2013, the Ahle Sunnat Wal Jama’at (former Sipah e Sahaba Pakistan) attacked the Hazara Shia Community in Quetta but Raisani's government did nothing to calm down the protestors.

In September 2014, the National Accountability Bureau of Pakistan started investigating charges of massive corruption against Raisani.
