= 2013 Balochistan provincial election =

- 11 May 2013

All 65 seats in the Provincial Assembly 38 seats needed for a majority
- Turnout: 40.86%(▲7.58%)
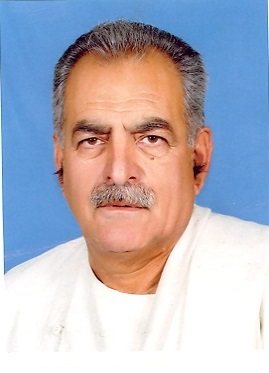

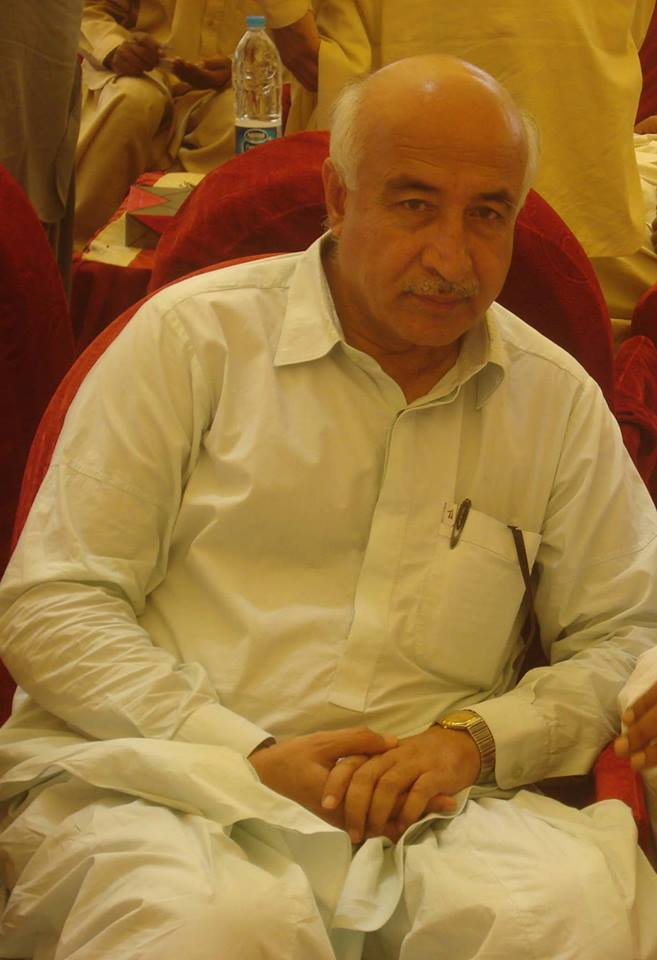

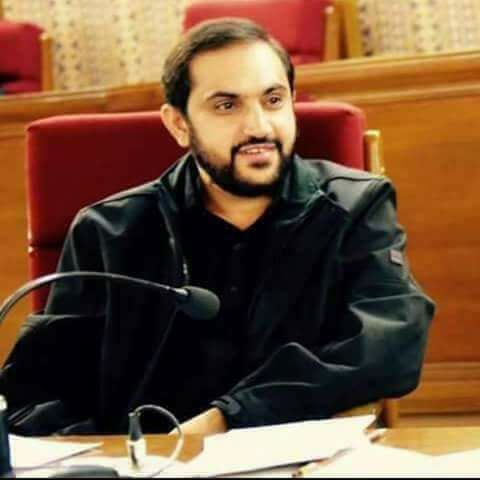

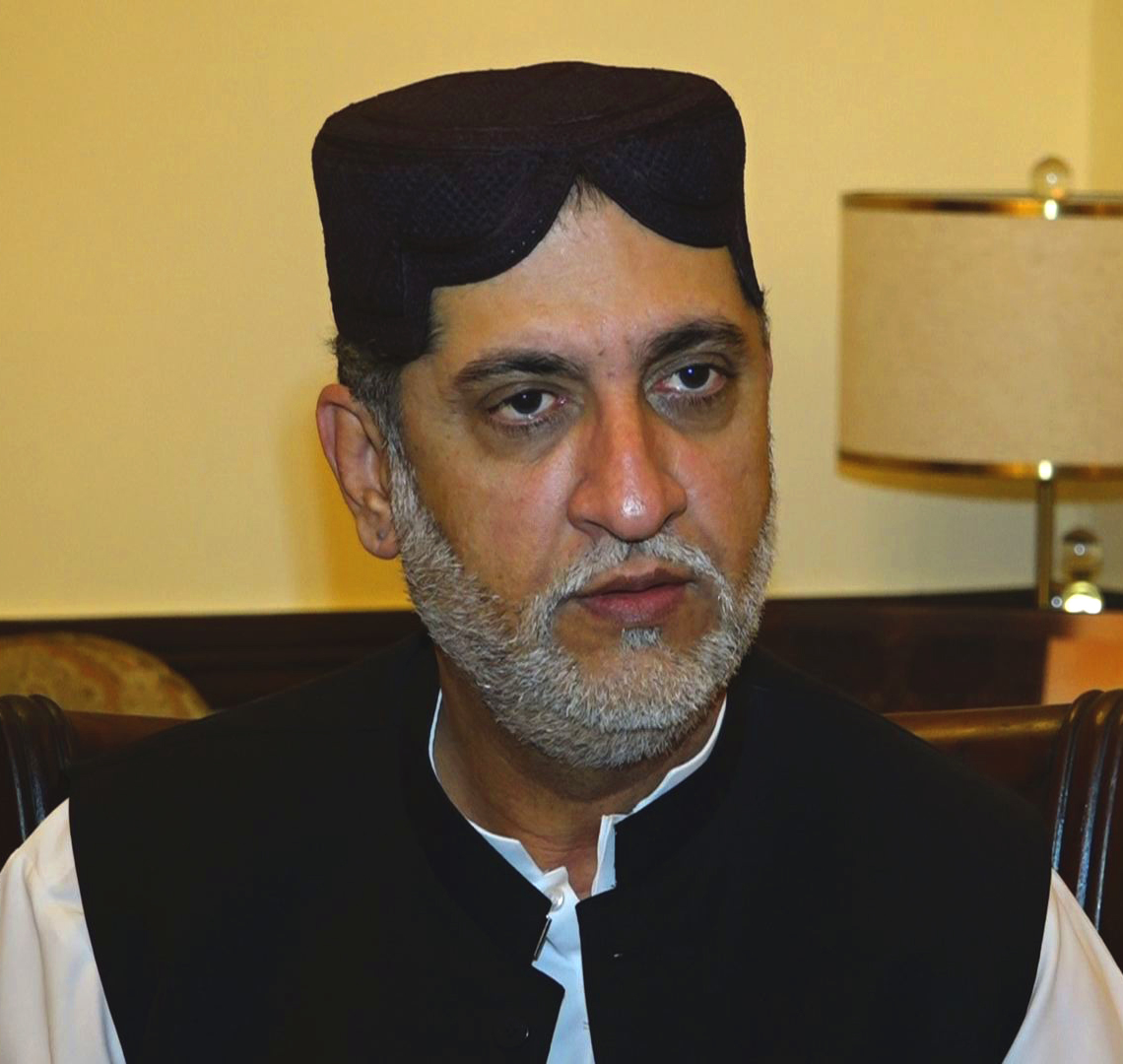
	First party	Second party	Third party
Leader	Hamid Khan Achakzai	Sanaullah Zehri	Abdul Malik Baloch
Party	PMAP	PML(N)	NP
Leader's seat	Qilla Abdullah-III	Khuzdar-I	Kech-I
Last election	boycotted	0 seats, 1.13%	1 seat, 0.78%
Seats won	14	12	10
Seat change	▲14	▲12	▲9
Popular vote	167,900	134,758	76,018
Percentage	13.06%	10.28%	5.78%
Swing	▲12.80%	▲9.15%	▲4.00%
	Fourth party	Fifth party	Sixth party
Leader	Maulana Abdul Wasey	Abdul Quddus Bizenjo	Akhtar Mengal
Party	JUI (F)	PML(Q)	BNP (M)
Leader's seat	Qilla Saifullah	Awaran	Khuzdar-III
Last election	9 seats, 15.10%	19 seats, 33.39%	7 seats, 5.06%
Seats won	8	6	2
Seat change	▼1	▼13	▼5
Popular vote	207,167	53,305	81,217
Percentage	15.80%	4.06%	6.19%
Swing	▲0.70%	▼29.33%	▲1.13%
Chief Minister before election
Muhammad Aslam Khan Raisani
PPP
Elected Chief Minister
Abdul Malik Baloch
NP

Provincial elections were held in the Pakistani province of Balochistan on 11 May 2013, alongside nationwide general elections and three other provincial elections in Sindh, Khyber Pakhtunkhwa and Punjab. The remaining two territories of Pakistan, Azad Kashmir and Gilgit-Baltistan, were ineligible to vote due to their disputed status.

== Background ==
The 2013 elections resulted in a hung parliament, before Pakistan Muslim League (N), National Party, and Pashtunkhwa Milli Awami Party joined hands to form a coalition government. A power-sharing agreement was also brokered between PML-N and NP where the province's Chief Ministership tenure would be bifurcated between the two parties. In consequence, NP's Abdul Malik Baloch served as chief minister from 2013 to 2015 before he was replaced by PML-N's Sanaullah Khan Zehri at the end of 2015.

However, Zehri couldn't complete his term as on 2 January 2018, a number of dissident members from the ruling PML-N colluded with opposition lawmakers to submit a no-confidence motion against him. Seeing that he has lost the majority of the house's support in the ensuing turmoil, Zehri resigned from his post before a no-confidence vote could take place. Pakistan Muslim League (Q)'s, Abdul Quddus Bizenjo, an opposition lawmaker and one of the leaders of the no-confidence bloc, was elected as the province's 15th Chief Minister. He secured 41 of the 65 votes.

== Results ==
Constituency	Name	Party
PB-22	Abdul Rahim Ziaratwal	Pashtunkhwa Milli Awami Party
PB-23	Changez Khan Marri	Pakistan Muslim League (N)
PB-25	Jan Mohammad Jamali	Pakistan Muslim League (N)
PB-35	Mohammad Akhtar Mengal	Balochistan National Party (Mengal)
PB-38	Nawab Muhammad Khan Shahwani	National Party (Pakistan)
PB-45	Mohammad Saleh Bhootani	Independent
PB-48	Abdul Malik Baloch	National Party (Pakistan)
PB-8	Agha Syed Liaqat Ali	Pashtunkhwa Milli Awami Party
PB-50	Akbar Askani	Pakistan Muslim League (N)
PB-49	Fateh Mohammad Baloch	National Party
PB-65	Ghansham Das Madwani Baloch	National Party
PB-9	Haji Abdul Malik Kakar	Jamiat-e-Ulema Islam (F)
PB-40	Haji Ghulam Dastagir Badeni	Pakistan Muslim League (N)
PB-7	Khalil-ur-Rehman (politician)	Jamiat-e-Ulema Islam (F)
PB-6	Manzoor Ahmed Kakar	Pashtunkhwa Milli Awami Party
PB-15	Mazaullah Musakhail	Jamiat-e-Ulema Islam (F)
PB-46	Mir Abdul Karim Nousherwani	Pakistan Muslim League (Q)
PB-28	Mir Abdul Majid Abro	Pakistan Muslim League (N)
PB-39	Mir Amanullah Notezai	Pakistan Muslim League (Q)
PB-31	Mir Amir Rind	Pakistan Muslim League (N)
PB-51	Mir Hamal Kalmati	Balochistan National Party (Mengal)
PB-27	Mir Izhar Hussain Khosa	Pakistan Muslim League (N)
PB-36	Mir Khalid Humayun Langau	National Party
PB-30	Mir Mohammad Asim Kurd Gello	Pakistan Muslim League (N)
PB-47	Mir Mujeeb-ur-Rehman Muhammad Hasani	National Party
PB-21	Mir Sarfraz Chakar Domki	Pakistan Muslim League (N)
PB-37	Mir Zafarullah Khan Zehri	Balochistan National Party (Awami)
PB-18	Mufti Gulab Khan	Jamiat-e-Ulema Islam (F)
PB-43	Muhammad Islam	National Party
PB-29	Muhammad Khan Lehri	Pakistan Muslim League (N)
PB-5 Quetta	Nasrullah Khan Zayray	Pashtunkhwa Milli Awami Party
PB-32	Nawabzada Tariq Magsi	Independent
PB-16	Obaidullah Jan Babat	Pashtunkhwa Milli Awami Party
PB-44	Prince Ahmed Ali Ahmedzai	Pakistan Muslim League (N)
PB-26	Rahat Jamali	Pakistan Muslim League (N)
PB-42	Rahmat Saleh Baloch	National Party
PB-17	Sardar Abdul Rehman Khetran	Jamiat-e-Ulema Islam (F)
PB-14	Sardar Dur Muhammad Nasar	Pakistan Muslim League (N)
PB-10	Sardar Ghulam Mustafa Khan Tareen	Pashtunkhwa Milli Awami Party
PB-34	Sardar Muhammad Aslam Bizenjo	National Party
PB-20	Maulana Abdul Wasay	Jamiat Ulamae-Islam (F)
PB-4 Quetta	Sardar Raza Muhammad Barrech	Pashtunkhwa Milli Awami Party
PB-24	Sarfaraz Ahmed Bugti	Pakistan Muslim League (N)
PB-19	Sheikh Jaffar Khan Mandokhail	Pakistan Muslim League (Q)
PB-3 Quetta	Nawab Ayaz Jogezai	Pashtunkhwa Milli Awami Party
PB-2 Quetta	Syed Muhammad Raza	Majlis Wahdatul Muslimeen
PB-1 Quetta	Tahir Mahmood Khan	Pakistan Muslim League (N)
PB-13	Abdul Majeed Khan Achakzai	Pashtunkhwa Milli Awami Party
PB-11	Hamid Khan Achakzai	Pashtunkhwa Milli Awami Party
PB-64	William Jan Barkat	Pashtunkhwa Milli Awami Party
PB-12	Zmrak Khan	Awami National Party
PB-41	Abdul Quddus Bizenjo	Pakistan Muslim League (Q)
Women's reserved seats	Arfa Siddiq	Pashtunkhwa Milli Awami Party
Women's reserved seats	Husan Bano	Jamiat-e-Ulema Islam (F)
Women's reserved seats	Kishwar Ahmed	Pakistan Muslim League (N)
Women's reserved seats	Masooma Hayat	Pashtunkhwa Milli Awami Party
Women's reserved seats	Ruqia Saeed Hashmi	Pakistan Muslim League (Q)
Women's reserved seats	Samina Khan	Pakistan Muslim League (N)
Women's reserved seats	Shahida Rauf	Jamiat-e-Ulema Islam (F)
Women's reserved seats	Shama Ishaq	National Party
Women's reserved seats	Spozmi Achakzai	Pashtunkhwa Milli Awami Party
Women's reserved seats	Yasmin Bibi	National Party
Women's reserved seats	Rahila Durrani	Pakistan Muslim League (N)
Women's reserved seats	Anita Irfan	Pakistan Muslim League (N)
Minorities' reserved seats	Santosh Kumar Bugti	Pakistan Muslim League (N)
