= Nur Parwana =

Pakistani Brahvi writer and journalist (1918–1995)

Baba-i-Brahvi Nur Parwana
- Brahui: نور محمد پروانہ
- Born: 15 February 1918; Sobhava, Khanate of Kalat
- Died: 16 December 1995 (aged 77); Balochistan province, Pakistan
- Occupations: Writer; journalist
- Writing career
- Language: Brahvi
- Period: 1939–1995

Nur Muhammad Parwana (Note: Brahui: نور محمد پروانہ) (15 February 1918 – 16 December 1995) was a Pakistani Brahvi writer, thinker and journalist. Born into the Pandrani clan, Parwana is known as Baba-i-Brahvi ("father of Brahvis").

== Biography ==
Nur Parwana was born on 15 February 1918 in Sobhava town near Usta Muhammad, Khanate of Kalat. His father, Maulana Mehr Dil, was an Islamic scholar and belonged to the Pandrani clan of Brahvis. While studying with Maulana Pandhi Khan, Parwana gained an interest in Brahvi poetry.

== Career ==
Parwana left his education incomplete to pursue a job at Levi's. He later resigned from his job and started his own tailoring company. During this while, Balochistan's politics were highly influenced by several nationalist leaders such as Mir Abdul Aziz Kurd and Abdul Samad Khan Achakzai. Parwana joined the Anjuman-i Watan Baluchistan and led its wing in Usta Muhammad. He also became member of Kalat State National Party.

In 1939, he started his journalistic career as an assistant director for the weekly Nawjawan Jacobabad. In 1940, Parwana was sent to Srinagar as a representative of Kalat State National Party. In 1942, he got married and moved to Muhammadpur Adhu.

Following the independence of Pakistan in 1947, Parwana led campaigns in promoting the Brahvi language. In 1951, Parwana became general secretary of the All-Pakistan Brahvi Association.

In 1958, Parwana met senior Brahvi politician Ghous Bakhsh Raisani and campaigned for promotion of the Brahvi language.

== Death ==
Parwana died on 16 December 1995 in Balochistan province of Pakistan.

== Legacy ==
Parwana is recognized as one of the foremost Brahvi intellectuals on the modern era.
