= Abdul Majeed Khan Achakzai =

Pakistani politician

Member of the Provincial Assembly of Balochistan
- In office 2013–2018
- Constituency: PB 13-Killa Abdullah III
- In office 2002–2007
- Constituency: PB 13-Killa Abdullah III

Personal details
- Born: December 22, 1962 (age 63) Gulistan, Balochistan, Pakistan
- Party: Pakhtunkhwa Milli Awami Party
- Parent: Hamid Khan Achakzai (father)
- Relatives: Abdul Samad Khan Achakzai (grand father); Muhammad Khan Achakzai (uncle); Mahmood Khan Achakzai (uncle)
- Education: University of Balochistan

Abdul Majeed Khan Achakzai (born 22 December 1962) is a Pakistani politician from Balochistan affiliated with the Pakhtunkhwa Milli Awami Party.

Born in 1962 in Gulistan, he is an agriculturist by profession and is a graduate of the University of Balochistan. From 2002 to 2007, he served as a member of the Provincial Assembly of Balochistan. He was elected from the PB-13 constituency (Killa Abdullah).

In the provincial election of 2013, he was elected into the provincial assembly again from the same constituency. He belongs to the Achakzai tribe of Balochistan.

== Hit and run case ==
On 20 June 2017, Traffic Sub-Inspector Haji Attaullah was controlling traffic at GPO Chowk on Zarghoon Road, Quetta, when he was hit by a speeding Land Cruiser. Initially, the police registered a case against unknown persons for killing the traffic inspector. However, when CCTV footage of the incident was aired on media, Majeed Khan Achakzai was arrested three days later. In December 2017, he was acquitted in a vehicle tampering case and later released on bail.

In September 2020, a model court in Pakistan's Balochistan province acquitted Majeed Khan Achakzai. Following which an appeal was filed by the provincial government against the acquittal.

In November 2026, Achakzai was convicted by the Balochistan High Court under Section 320 (punishment for qatl-i-khata by rash or negligent driving) of the Pakistan Penal Code in the hit and run case. He was sentenced to ten years in prison and also ordered to pay diyat to the legal heirs of the deceased.
