= Malik Saeed Dehwar =

Pakistani politician (1918–2005)

Malik Muhammad Saeed Dehwar

secretary of the Kalat State National Party
- In office February 5, 1937 – 1948
- Preceded by: Office established
- Succeeded by: The office was cancelled

Personal details
- Born: 15 December 1918 Mastung, Baluchistan, British India (present-day Balochistan, Pakistan)
- Died: 10 April 2005 (aged 86) Karachi, Sindh, Pakistan
- Party: Kalat State National Party

Malik Muhammad Saeed Dehwar (1918–2005) was the secretary of the Kalat State National Party.

Malik Muhammad Saeed Dehwar was born on 15 December 1918 in the village Tiri in Mastung District, Pakistan. He belongs to the tribe of khawajakhail sub-cast of the Dehwar tribe living in Mastung valley. He attended public school in Mastung and then Islamia College Peshawar. He completed a Masters in Politics from Balochistan University in 1947. He has three daughters and seven sons; Malik Naseer Ahmad, Malik Bashir Ahmad, Malik Nadir khan, Malik Zaheer Ahmad, Malik Zain-ul-Abdin, Malik Abdul Majeed, Malik Abdul Hammed. After his death his son Malik Bashir Ahmad is head of village Tiri in Mastung District.

He was a friend and companion of Yousaf Aziz Magsi and Abdul Samad Khan Achakzai. He was familiar with the Urdu, Persian, English and Balochi languages. Malik Saeed was also part of the group closely associated with Prince Agha Abdul Karim Khan Ahmedzai during his rebellion of 1948 against Pakistan and for the independence of Pakistan. Malik Saeed was sent to Kabul as emissary with Kadir Bux Nizamani to request military aid from the Government of Pakistan. After the defeat of the rebellion by the Pakistan army, Malik Saeed was captured and imprisoned in Mach Jail together with other leaders such as Muhuammed Hussain Anka, Agha Abdul Karim and others.

His first book was Balochistan Gabil-e-Tareek, issued in 1971 by the Balochi Academy.

He died at the age of 89 on 10 April 2005.
