= Murree Agreement =

Muree Agreement (Urdu: مری معاہدہ) was a power sharing agreement signed in June 2013 between the National Party and Pakistan Muslim League to govern the Balochistan province of Pakistan for five year term. The 2013 Pakistani general election with no political party with a majority in elected Balochistan legislature resulted in a coalition government with National Party and Pakistan Muslim League. The agreement also included a clause that half of the term a member of the National Party will serve as the Chief Minister of Balochistan to be replaced by a candidate from Pakistan Muslim League. Abdul Malik Baloch served as Chief Minister of Balochistan from June 7, 2013 to December 10, 2015 and was replaced by Sardar Sanaullah Zehri.
