= 2013 Pakistani provincial elections =

The 2013 Pakistani provincial elections may refer to:

- 2013 Balochistan provincial election
- 2013 Khyber Pakhtunkhwa provincial election
- 2013 Punjab provincial election
- 2013 Sindh provincial election
