= Anjuman-i-Watan Baluchistan =

Political party in British India

The Anjuman-i-Watan Baluchistan (Balochi: انجمن وتن بلۏچستان, lit. 'Motherland of Balochistan'), commonly referred to as Anjuman-i-Watan, was a political party in British India based in the province of Baluchistan (modern Balochistan, Pakistan). It was led by Abdul Samad Khan Achakzai.

The Anjuman-i-Watan allied itself with the Indian National Congress (INC) and also worked with the Anjuman-i Ittihad-i Balochan o Balochistan, as well as its successor, the Kalat State National Party (KSNP).

It was a member of the All-India Azad Muslim Conference and opposed the partition of India.

== See also ==
- Opposition to the partition of India
- Abdul Aziz Kurd
- Yousaf Aziz Magsi
