= Rakhshani =

Rakhshani may refer to:

- Rakhshani, a Baloch tribe
- Rakshani, a dialect of Balochi
- Rakhshani, Hirmand, a village in Iran

== People with the name ==
- Husan Bano Rakhshani, Pakistani politician
- Rhett Rakhshani, American ice hockey player
