= Santosh Kumar Bugti =

Pakistani politician

- سنتوش کمار بگٹی

Member of the Provincial Assembly of Balochistan
- In office 2013–2018

Personal details
- Party: Pakistan Muslim League (N)
- Occupation: Politician

Santosh Kumar Bugti (Urdu/Balochi: سنتوش کمار بگٹی) is a Pakistani politician. He served as a member of the Provincial Assembly of Balochistan from 2013 to 2018 on a reserved seat for minorities, and is affiliated with the Pakistan Muslim League (N) (PML-N).

== Background ==
Bugti was born to father Narain Das and hails from the Dera Bugti District. He belongs to Balochistan's Hindu community. Prior to entering politics, he was known as a community leader and rights advocate for the Hindu minority.

== Political career ==
Bugti has been affiliated with the Pakistan Muslim League (N) and was elected to the Balochistan Provincial Assembly on a reserved seat for minorities in the 2013 election, an office he held until the completion of his term in 2018. During this time, he developed a close association with prime minister Nawaz Sharif. He served as the information secretary of the PML-N's Balochistan wing.

In November 2014, Bugti's legislature membership was revoked by the Election Commission of Pakistan following a reference filed against him by PML-N Balochistan leader Sanaullah Khan Zehri on grounds of non-attendance of assembly proceedings. It was reported that political differences had also developed between Bugti and the provincial PML-N leadership at the time. However, Bugti received backing from Sharif and challenged the verdict in the Supreme Court of Pakistan. He won the case and his membership was reinstated.

In March 2022, Bugti visited Sharif at his residence in London and assured him of the Hindu community's support in a meeting later publicised in the media.
