= Qayyum Papa Stadium =

Football stadium in Quetta, Pakistan

- Interactive map of Qayyum Papa Stadium
- Location: Mari Abad, Quetta, Pakistan
- Coordinates: 30.1874°N 67.0351°E
- Capacity: 10,000
- Surface: Artificial turf

Construction
- Opened: 2014; 12 years ago
- Renovated: 2023; 3 years ago
- Architect: Syed Muhammad Raza

The Qayyum Papa Stadium, also known as Qayyum Ali Changezi Stadium, is a football stadium in Mari Abad, Quetta, Pakistan. Named after the Pakistan national football team former captain Qayyum Ali Changezi, it has the capacity to accommodate up to 10,000 spectators. The stadium has also been used on occasion to celebrate the Hazara culture day.

== History ==
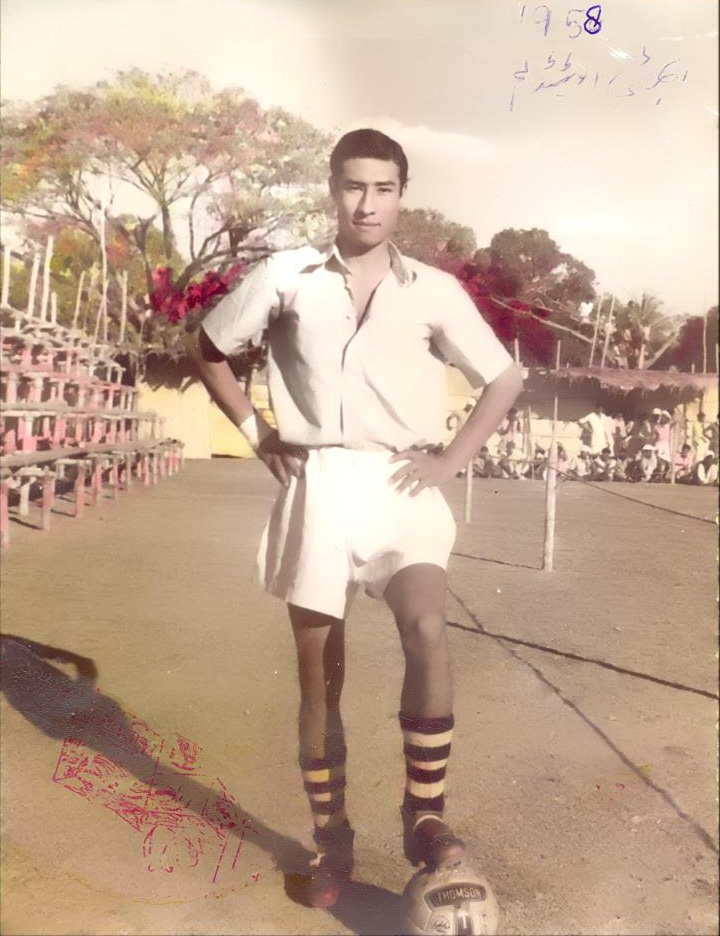
Qayyum Changezi in 1958

The stadium was initially built by MPA minister Syed Muhammad Agha Raza in 2014, named after footballer Qayyum Ali Changezi who played for the Pakistan national team in the 1950s and 1960s. It was initially intended to engage local youth in sports and providing a safe environment to deter them from harmful activities like drug use.

In 2019, a Ramazan tournament was held at the stadium where the teams from Quetta and specifically from the Hazara community would play in the venue. In 2020, the stadium also was one of the three venues in the All Pakistan Chief Minister Balochistan Gold Cup Football Tournament, which was held after a lapse of 17 years by the provincial minister Abdul Khaliq Hazara, featuring 21 teams.

=== Renovation ===
Over time, neglect, mismanagement, and funding issues led to the stadium falling into disrepair. Renovation started in February 2023, led by provincial minister Abdul Khaliq Hazara.

In May 2023, the venue was used to hold football matches in the 34th 2023 National Games of Pakistan, which were held after almost 19 years in the province of Balochistan. In July 2023, the stadium became the first-ever synthetic turf football ground in the province of Balochistan, after transitioning from natural grass to artificial turf.

== See also ==
- List of football stadiums in Pakistan
