= Alauddin Marri =

Pakistani politician

Alauddin Marri علاؤ الدین مری
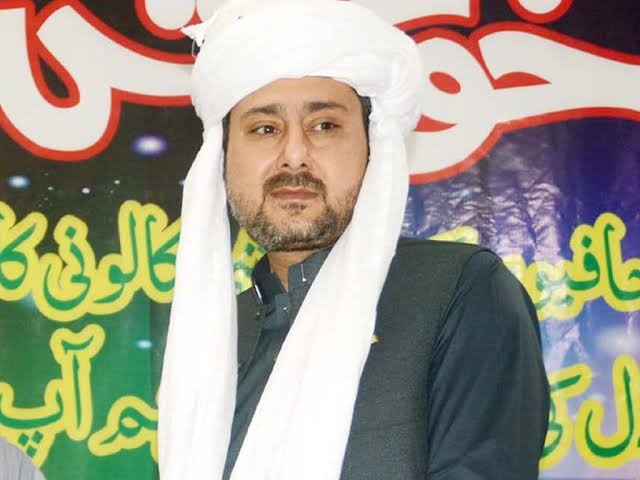

Chief Minister of Balochistan
- Caretaker
- In office 8 June 2018 – 19 August 2018
- Governor: Muhammad Khan Achakzai
- Preceded by: Abdul Quddus Bizenjo
- Succeeded by: Jam Kamal Khan

Personal details
- Born: February 28, 1979 (age 47) Quetta, Balochistan, Pakistan
- Education: University of Balochistan

Alauddin Marri (Urdu: علاؤ الدین مری; born 28 February 1979) is a Pakistani businessman and social worker who served as caretaker Chief Minister of Balochistan, in office from 8 June 2018 to 19 August 2018.

== Early life and education ==
He was born on 28 February 1979 in Quetta, Balochistan, Pakistan. He completed his early education from Tameer-i-Nau Public School and from the Tameer-i-Nau Public College in Quetta, and graduated from the University of Balochistan.

He is from Mastung District of Balochistan, Pakistan and hails from Marri tribe.

== Chief Ministership ==
He was recommended by the outgoing Balochistan government but consensus between opposition and government could not be reached and the matter to appoint him to the post was decided by the Election Commission of Pakistan on 7 June 2018.

Political offices Chief Minister of Balochistan
Preceded by Abdul Quddus Bizenjo	Caretaker; 2018	Succeeded by Jam Kamal Khan
