= Khair Jan Baloch =

Pakistani politician

Member of the Provincial Assembly of Balochistan
- Incumbent
- Assumed office 29 February 2024
- Constituency: PB-23 Awaran

Personal details
- Born: Awaran District, Balochistan, Pakistan
- Political party: NP (2024-present)

Khair Jan Baloch is a Pakistani politician from Awaran District. He is currently serving as a member of the Provincial Assembly of Balochistan since February 2024.

== Career ==
He contested the 2024 general elections as a National Party candidate from PB-23 Awaran. He secured 15635 votes while his runner-up was Abdul Quddus Bizenjo of Pakistan Peoples Party Parliamentarians who secured 9233 votes.
