= Anjuman-i Ittihad-i Balochan o Balochistan =

Political party in British India

Society for the Unity of Balochs and Balochistan انجمن اتحاد بلۏچان ءُ بلۏچستان Anjuman-i Ittihad-i Balochan o Balochistan
- Abbreviation: AIB
- Leader: Abdul Aziz Kurd and Yousaf Aziz Magsi
- First Secretary: Abdul Aziz Kurd
- Founded: 1928
- Dissolved: February 5, 1937
- Preceded by: Young Baloch
- Succeeded by: Kalat State National Party
- Headquarters: Sibi
- Ideology: Baloch nationalism Anti-imperialism; Secularism

Anjuman-i Ittihad-i Balochan o Balochistan (AIB) (Note: Balochi: انجمن اتحاد بلۏچان ءُ بلۏچستان, romanized: Anjuman-i Ittihad-i Balochan o Balochistan) was a political party formed in 1931 in Mastung, Kalat State by Abdul Aziz Kurd and Yousaf Aziz Magsi in British India. The main aims of the party were to end colonization, the unification of Balochistan into one state, and the end of Sardari system.

The Kalat State National Party (KSNP) emerged from AIB on 5 February 1937 in Sibi, contesting elections until the government banned its activities in 1947. The Anjuman-i-Watan Baluchistan, which allied itself with the Indian National Congress (INC) and opposed the partition of India, worked with the Anjuman-i Ittihad-i Balochan o Balochistan, as well as its successor the KSNP.

== See also ==
- Abdul Aziz Kurd
- Yousaf Aziz Magsi
- Kalat State National Party (KSNP)
- Anjuman-i-Watan Baluchistan

== Bibliography ==
- Amirali, Alia (2015), "Balochistan: A Case Study of Pakistan's Peacemaking Praxis (Volume III)", in Rita Manchanda (ed.), SAGE Series in Human Rights Audits of Peace Processes, SAGE Publications, ISBN 978-93-5150-213-5
- Axmann, Martin (2008), Back to the Future: The Khanate of Kalat and the Genesis of Baloch Nationalism, 1915-1955, Oxford University Press, ISBN 978-0-19-547645-3
- Harrison, Selig S. (1981), In Afghanistan's Shadow: Baluch Nationalism and Soviet Temptations, Carnegie Endowment for International Peace, ISBN 978-0-87003-029-1
- Siddiqi, Farhan Hanif (2015), "The Political Economy of the Ethno-nationalist Uprising in Pakistani Balochistan, 1999–2013", The Political Economy of Conflict in South Asia, Palgrave Macmillan UK, pp. 57–74, ISBN 9780415686143
- Butt, Saima (9 November 2022). "The Rise of Political Awareness and Institutional Development in Balochistan in British Era". Pakistan Perspective. 27 (1). ISSN 2707-899X.
