= William Jan Barkat =

Pakistani politician

Member of the Provincial Assembly of Balochistan
- In office 1 June 2013 – 31 May 2018
- Preceded by: Jaffer George
- Succeeded by: Sham Lal
- Constituency: NM-64 (Reserved seat for minorities)

Personal details
- Party: Pashtunkhwa Milli Awami Party

William Jan Barkat (Urdu: ولیم جان برکت) is a Pakistani politician who was elected member for the 10th Provincial Assembly of Balochistan.

== Political career ==
William was elected in the 2013 Pakistani general election to the Provincial Assembly of Balochistan on a reserved seat for minorities. He was representing Pashtunkhwa Milli Awami Party
