= Tahira Safdar =

Pakistani jurist

Tahira Safdar طاہرہ صفدر

Chief Justice of Balochistan High Court
- In office 1 September 2018 – 4 October 2019
- Appointed by: Mian Saqib Nisar
- Preceded by: Muhammad Noor Meskanzai
- Succeeded by: Jamal Khan Mandokhail

Senior Justice of Balochistan High Court
- In office 11 May 2011 – 31 August 2018
- Preceded by: Muhammad Noor Meskanzai
- Succeeded by: Jamal Khan Mandokhail

Additional Judge Balochistan High Court
- In office 7 September 2009 – 10 May 2011

Chairperson of Balochistan Services Tribunal
- In office 10 July 2009 – 6 September 2009

Member Balochistan Services Tribunal
- In office 22 October 1998 – 6 September 2009

District and Sessions Judge
- In office 27 February 1996 – 21 October 1998

Senior Civil Judge
- In office 29 June 1987 – 26 February 1991

Civil Judge
- In office 1982 – 26 February 1991

Personal details
- Born: 5 October 1957 (age 68) Quetta, Balochistan, Pakistan
- Parent: Syed Imtiaz Hussain Baqri Hanafi (father)
- Education: Cantonment Public School, Quetta; Government Girls College, Quetta University of Balochistan (MA); University Law College, Quetta (LL.B)

Syeda Tahira Safdar (Urdu: سیدہ طاہرہ صفدر; born 5 October 1957) is a retired Pakistani jurist who served as the Chief Justice of Balochistan High Court.

She became the first female chief justice of any high court in the history of Pakistan. Her nomination as chief justice of Balochistan High Court was confirmed by the Chief Justice of Pakistan on 23 July 2018. On the provincial level, she has the honor of being the first lady in all posts she served in her life including being the first female civil judge in Balochistan in 1982.

== Early life and education ==
She was born on 5 October 1957 in Quetta, Pakistan. Her father, Syed Imtiaz Hussain Baqri Hanafi, was a lawyer by profession. She completed her primary education from Cantonment Public School, Quetta, bachelor's degree from Government Girls College, Quetta, masters in Urdu literature from University of Balochistan and in 1980, a law degree from University Law College, Quetta.

== Judicial career ==
In 1982, she became the first female civil judge of Balochistan. She passed the Balochistan Public Service Commission examination and was promoted to senior civil judge on 29 June 1987. She went on to become an additional district and sessions judge on 27 February 1991 and then as a full-fledged district and sessions judge on 1 March 1996. She also presided the Labor Court. She first became the member on 22 October 1998 and then the chairperson on 10 July 2009 of Balochistan Services Tribunal. She was elevated as an additional judge of Balochistan High Court on 7 September 2009. She became the judge of Balochistan High Court on 11 May 2011. In 2012, she attended a training in The Hague, Netherlands on the topic of International Law for Justice on Meeting International Human Rights Standards in Criminal Proceedings. She has been part of numerous other international conferences on topic of law throughout her judicial career. She has been serving as a member of the Administration Committee, the Promotion Committee and the Committee which drafts and examines the rules and their particulars and which also drafts regulations, circulars and notifications. She was confirmed to be the Chief Justice of Balochistan High Court on 23 July 2018 and took charge as such on 1 September 2018. In her capacity in this post, she became the first female chief justice of any court in Pakistan.

She is hearing the high treason case against former dictator Pervez Musharraf as part of a three-member special court which was approved by former prime minister Nawaz Sharif on 19 November 2013.

== See also ==
- Suman Kumari
