= Rahmat Saleh Baloch =

Pakistani politician

Member of the Provincial Assembly of Balochistan
- In office 29 May 2013 – 31 May 2018

Personal details
- Born: 1 January 1975 (age 51) Panjgur District, Balochistan, Pakistan
- Party: NP (2013-present)

Rahmat Saleh Baloch is a Pakistani politician who was a Member of the Provincial Assembly of Balochistan, from May 2013 to May 2018.

== Early life and education ==
He was born on 1 January 1975 in Panjgur District.

He has received a degree in Bachelor of Science from Degree College Panjgur in 1997.

== Political career ==
He was elected to the Provincial Assembly of Balochistan in the 2002 Pakistani general election.

He was re-elected to the Provincial Assembly of Balochistan as a candidate of National Party from Constituency PB-42 Panjgoor-I in the 2013 Pakistani general election.
