= Mir Khalid Humayun Langau =

Pakistani politician

Mir khalid langau

Member of the Provincial Assembly of Balochistan
- In office 29 May 2013 – 31 May 2018

Personal details
- Born: 5 July 1975 (age 50) Kalat District
- Party: No present affiliation

Mir Khalid Humayun Langau is a Pakistani politician who was a Member of the Provincial Assembly of Balochistan from May 2013 to May 2018.

== Early life and education ==
He was born on 7 May 1978 in Kalat District.

He has a degree in Master of Arts.

== Political career ==
He was elected to the Provincial Assembly of Balochistan as a candidate of National Party from Constituency PB-36 Kalat-I in the 2013 Pakistani general election.

== Corruption ==
He has been arrested for corruption after investigators of the top graft-buster found more than Rs5 million in cash stashed in cartons at a bakery in Quetta.
