= Izbal Zehri =

Pakistani politician

Izbal Zehri is a Pakistani politician who has been a Member of the National Assembly of Pakistan since 2024.

== Personal life ==
She was born to Sanaullah Khan Zehri. In May 2024, the Dubai Unlocked leaks revealed that she had made a substantial investment in Dubai's luxury real estate market.

== Political career ==
In the 2024 Pakistani general election, she secured a seat in the National Assembly of Pakistan through a reserved quota for women as a candidate of Pakistan People's Party (PPP).
