= Abdul Hai Baloch =

Pakistani politician (1946–2022)

Doctor Abdul Hai Baloch
- عبدالحئی بلوچ

Member of National Assembly of Pakistan
- In office 14 April 1972 – 10 January 1977
- Constituency: NW-137 (Kalat-I)

Personal details
- Born: 1 February 1946 Village Bhag Nari, Bolan District, Balochistan, British Raj
- Died: 25 February 2022 (aged 76)
- Party: National Democratic Party (2018–2022)
- Other political affiliations: National Party Pakistan (2003–2018); Balochistan National Movement (1988–2003)
- Education: MBBS
- Alma mater: Dow Medical College
- Occupation: Doctor, politician
- Awards: Jalib Peace Award 2016 by Arts Council of Pakistan

Abdul Hai Baloch (Urdu: عبدالحئی بلوچ), also known as Abdul Hayee Baloch (1 February 1946 – 25 February 2022), was a Pakistani social and political activist from Balochistan.

== Early life and education ==
Baloch was born on 1 February 1946 in the Chhalgari District Bolan in the Balochistan province of Pakistan. He received an MBBS from Dow Medical college.

== Political career ==
He was elected as the member of National Assembly of Pakistan in 1970s. Baloch was the prominent and one of the founding leaders of Balochistan National Movement and later became the president of the National Party. He later formed his own political party known as National Democratic Party (NDP) in 2018.

== Awards and honours ==
Baloch received the Jalib Peace Award 2016 given by the Arts Council of Pakistan.

== Personal life and death ==
He died in a traffic collision on 25 February 2022, at the age of 76.

== See also ==
- National Awami Party
- Baloch Students Organization
- Communist Party of Pakistan
