= Shama Ishaq Baloch =

Pakistani politician

Shama Ishaq

Member of the Provincial Assembly of Balochistan
- In office 29 May 2013 – 31 May 2018
- Constituency: Reserved seat for women

Personal details
- Born: 1969 (age 56–57) Mastung District
- Party: National Party

Shama Ishaq Baloch (Urdu: شمع اسحاق بلوچ; born c. 1969) is a Pakistani politician who was a Member of the Provincial Assembly of Balochistan from May 2013 to May 2018.

== Early life and education ==
Baloch was born in 1969 in Mastung District.

She has a degree of the Bachelor of Medicine and Bachelor of Surgery from Bolan Medical College.

== Political career ==
Baloch was elected to the Provincial Assembly of Balochistan as a candidate of National Party on a reserved seat for women in the 2002 Pakistani general election.

Baloch was re-elected to the Provincial Assembly of Balochistan as a candidate of National Party on a reserved seat for women in the 2013 Pakistani general election.
