= PB-23 Awaran =

Constituency of the Provincial Assembly of Balochistan, Pakistan

- Provincial constituency for the Provincial Assembly of Balochistan
- Region: Awaran District

Current constituency
- Seats: 1
- Party: Vacant
- Member: Vacant
- Created from: PB-41 (Awaran)

PB-23 Awaran (پی بی-23 آواران) is a constituency of the Provincial Assembly of Balochistan.

== General elections 2024 ==
Provincial election 2024: PB-23 Awaran
Party	Candidate	Votes	%	±%
NP	Khair Jan Baloch	15,635	57.07	
PPP	Abdul Quddus Bizenjo	9,233	33.70	
BAP	Mehrullah Hassani	1,071	3.91	
Others	Others (six candidates)	1,457	5.32	
Turnout		29,289	31.80	
Total valid votes		27,396	93.54	
Rejected ballots		1,893	6.46	
Majority		6,402	23.37	
Registered electors		92,104		

== Election 2013 ==
General Election 2013: PB-41 (Awaran-I)
Party	Candidate	Votes	%
PML(Q)	Abdul Quddus Bizenjo	544	80.95
NP	Hayder Ali	95	14.14
JUI (F)	Hafiz Abdul Khaliq Bizenjo	18	2.68
Others	Others	15	2.24
Valid ballots		672	98.39
Rejected ballots		11	1.61
Turnout		683	1.18
Majority		449	66.81
PML(Q) gain from Independent			

== See also ==
- PB-22 Lasbela
- PB-24 Gwadar
