= Muhammad Islam =

Pakistani politician

Member of the Provincial Assembly of Balochistan
- In office 29 May 2013 – 31 May 2018

Personal details
- Party: NP (2013-present)

Muhammad Islam is a Pakistani politician who was a Member of the Provincial Assembly of Balochistan, from May 2013 to May 2018.

== Personal life and education ==
He was born in Panjgur District.

He has completed Matriculation.

He is a landlord by profession.

== Political career ==
He was elected to the Provincial Assembly of Balochistan as a candidate of National Party from Constituency PB-43 Panjgoor-II in the 2013 Pakistani general election.
