= Sardar Muhammad Aslam Bizenjo =

Pakistani politician

Member of the Provincial Assembly of Balochistan
- In office 29 May 2013 – 31 May 2018

Personal details
- Born: 1 February 1951 (age 75) Khuzdar District
- Party: National Party

Sardar Muhammad Aslam Bizenjo is a Pakistani politician who was a Member of the Provincial Assembly of Balochistan from May 2013 to May 2018.

== Early life and education ==
He was born on 1 February 1951 in Khuzdar District.

He has a degree in Bachelor of Arts.

== Political career ==
He was elected to the Provincial Assembly of Balochistan as a candidate of National Party from Constituency PB-34 Khuzdar-II in the 2013 Pakistani general election.
