= 2024 Pakistani presidential election =

Elections for the 14th President of Pakistan

- 9 March 2024

696 votes in the Electoral College Plurality of votes needed to win
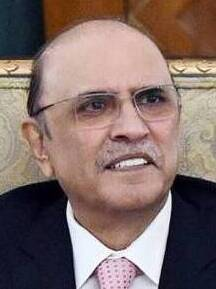

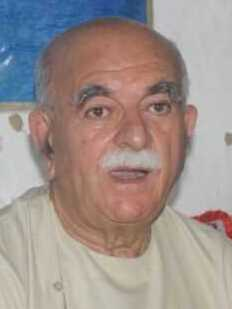
| Candidate | Asif Ali Zardari | Mahmood Khan Achakzai |
| Party | PPP | PMAP |
| Home state | Sindh | Balochistan |
| Electoral vote | 411 | 181 |
| States carried | 3 + ICT | 1 |
| Percentage | 69.43 | 30.57 |
President before election
Arif Alvi
PTI
Elected President
Asif Ali Zardari
PPP

Presidential Elections were held in Pakistan on 9 March 2024 to select the 14th President of Pakistan, who is the country's head of state. Asif Ali Zardari of the Pakistan People's Party was elected as 14th President of Pakistan, defeating Mahmood Khan Achakzai of the PTI-backed Sunni Itehad Council (SIC) alliance. Former President Arif Alvi was eligible for re-election but did not contest for a second term.

== Background ==
Since the National Assembly and the four Provincial Assemblies were dissolved before the presidential election could take place, the election was conducted after general elections to all five assemblies, which were held on 8 February 2024. Therefore, the presidential election was held on 9 March 2024, as it needed to be held within thirty days of the elections to the assemblies, according to the proviso of Article 41(5) of the Constitution of Pakistan. Moreover, according to the proviso of Article 44(1) of the Constitution of Pakistan, Alvi continued to hold office until his successor would be elected.

== Schedule ==
The Election Commission of Pakistan announced the initial election schedule on 1 March 2024. Polling will be conducted in the following five places on 9 March 2024:

- Parliament House, Islamabad
- Punjab Provincial Assembly, Lahore
- Sindh Provincial Assembly, Karachi
- Khyber Pakhtunkhwa Provincial Assembly, Peshawar
- Balochistan Provincial Assembly, Quetta

Members of Senate and National Assembly cast their votes at Parliament House whereas members of Provincial Assemblies cast their votes at respective assemblies.

== Electoral system ==
The president of Pakistan is indirectly elected by the Electoral College of Pakistan – a joint sitting of the Senate, National Assembly and Provincial Assemblies.

The votes of the members of the Senate and National Assembly are counted as single votes. Meanwhile, the votes given by the provincial assembly legislators are adjusted to give each province an equal share in the election. This is because each provincial assembly has a varying number of members, depending on population size. The largest province by population size, Punjab, has a total of 371 members in its assembly, whereas the smallest province of Balochistan has only 65 members in its legislature. Therefore, the provincial votes are weighted against the Balochistan assembly in the following manner:

| Provincial Assembly | Members | Weightage of each vote | Total votes |
|---|---|---|---|
| Balochistan | 65 | 1 | 65 |
| Khyber-Pakhtunkhwa | 145 | 0.448 | 65 |
| Sindh | 168 | 0.387 | 65 |
| Punjab | 371 | 0.175 | 65 |

Regarding timing, the constitution states that election to the office of President must be held no earlier than sixty days and no later than thirty days before the expiration of the term of the incumbent president. If assemblies are not present, the constitution allows the election of the president to be delayed thirty days after the general election.

The electoral process itself is done via a secret ballot due to the post of the president being constitutionally non-partisan. Therefore, unlike during the election of the Prime Minister, cross-party voting is not liable to be considered defection.

== Electoral College ==
The Electoral College of Pakistan is formed by a joint sitting of the six following leading political bodies in Pakistan:

- The Senate of Pakistan
- The National Assembly of Pakistan
- The Provincial Assembly of the Punjab
- The Provincial Assembly of Sindh
- The Provincial Assembly of Balochistan
- The Provincial Assembly of Khyber Paktunkhwa

The maximum strength of the Electoral College is 706. However, considering the vacant seats, the electoral college for this presidential election stood at 679. A simple majority is required in a two-candidate contest to claim victory. But in a three-candidate race, the victory requirement goes down considerably depending on how the votes are split.

== Candidates ==
On 15 December 2023, Faisal Karim Kundi, the spokesperson of the Pakistan People's Party (PPP), announced that former President Asif Ali Zardari, who is also the party's president, would be their presidential candidate for the 2024 elections. The Pakistan Muslim League (N) (PML(N)) has also announced its support for Zardari's candidacy. Moreover, the Muttahida Qaumi Movement – Pakistan (MQM–P), Balochistan Awami Party (BAP), Awami National Party (ANP), and Istehkam-e-Pakistan Party (IPP) have also announced their support for Zardari.

On 2 March 2024, PTI-backed Sunni Ittehad Council nominated Mahmood Khan Achakzai, the leader of the Pashtunkhwa Milli Awami Party (PMAP), as their presidential candidate.

Jamiat Ulema-e-Islam (F) and Jamat-e-Islami boycotted presidential polls.

== Results ==
Asif Ali Zardari won the election by getting 411 electoral votes.

Results of the 2024 Pakistani presidential election
| Candidate | Party | Electoral college | | | | | Total votes | % | Total weighted | % |
| Candidate | Party | Parl | P | S | B | KP | Total votes | % | Total weighted | % |
|---|---|---|---|---|---|---|---|---|---|---|
| Asif Ali Zardari | PPP | 255 | 246 | 151 | 47 | 17 | 716 | 69.18 | 411 | 69.43 |
| Mahmood Khan Achakzai | PMAP | 119 | 100 | 9 | 0 | 91 | 319 | 30.82 | 181 | 30.57 |
| Valid votes | | 374 | 346 | 160 | 47 | 108 | 1035 | 99.14 | 592 | 100 |
| Invalid/blank votes | | 1 | 6 | 1 | 0 | 1 | 9 | 0.86 | – | – |
| Total | | 375 | 352 | 161 | 47 | 109 | 1044 | 100 | – | – |
| Abstention | | 61 | 19 | 7 | 18 | 36 | 141 | 14,94 | – | – |
| Registered voters/turnout | | 436 | 371 | 168 | 65 | 145 | 1185 | 85.06 | – | – |

== See also ==
- 2024 Pakistani general election
- List of members of the 16th National Assembly of Pakistan
- 2024 Punjab provincial election
- 2024 Sindh provincial election
- 2024 Khyber Pakhtunkhwa provincial election
- 2024 Balochistan provincial election
