= Safdar Kayani =

Pakistani Scientist

- Born: 20 June 1948; Lahore, Punjab province
- Died: 22 April 2008 (aged 59); Quetta, Balochistan province
- Citizenship: Pakistan
- Education: University of the Punjab
- Known for: Pro-Vice-Chancellor of the University of Balochistan
- Scientific career
- Fields: Botany and Ecology
- Workplaces: University of Balochistan

Safdar Ali Kayani was a Pakistani ecologist, professor, and pro-vice-chancellor at the University of Balochistan in Quetta, Pakistan.

== Murder ==
Kayani was shot and killed by a gunman riding a motorbike on 22 April 2008, while he was walking near his home in Quetta. The Baloch Liberation Army claimed responsibility for Kayani's killing, although sources conflict on the reason stated for the killing.

Kayani was buried in his hometown of Jhelum in Punjab.

== Career ==
Kayani was a community ecologist who specialized in plant-environment dynamics in Balochistan and, more broadly, Pakistan. As early as 1981, Kayani studied how soil types and termites affected the distribution of various plant species. Much of his research involved the termites and native plants of the region of Pakistan where he lived. Kayani remained an active researcher until his death, maintaining a strong publishing relationship with the Pakistan Journal of Botany from 1981 and even receiving credit on articles published after his death. His later research involved a variety of plant species including both crops and native plants.
