= Sham Lal (politician) =

Politician in Pakistan

Mukhi Sham Lal Lasi

Member of the Provincial Assembly of Balochistan
- In office 13 August 2018 – 12 August 2023
- Preceded by: William Jan Barkat
- Constituency: NM-64 (Reserved seat for minorities)

Personal details
- Born: 1953 (age 72–73) Uthal distt Lasbela
- Party: Muttahida Majlis-e-Amal JUI
- Children: 5

Mukhi Sham Lal Lasi (Urdu: مکھی شام لال لاسی) is a Pakistani politician who had been a member for the Provincial Assembly of Balochistan from August 2018 to August 2023.

== Political career ==
He was elected to Provincial Assembly of Balochistan on a reserved seat for minorities in the 2018 Pakistani general election representing Muttahida Majlis-e-Amal.
