= Yasmin Bibi =

Pakistani politician

Member of the Provincial Assembly of Balochistan
- In office 29 May 2013 – 31 May 2018
- Constituency: Reserved seat for women

Personal details
- Party: National Party

Yasmin Bibi (Urdu: یاسمین بی بی) is a Pakistani politician who was a Member of the Provincial Assembly of Balochistan from May 2013 to May 2018.

== Education ==
She holds the degree of the Master of Arts.

== Political career ==
She was elected to the Provincial Assembly of Balochistan as a candidate of National Party on a reserved seat for women in the 2013 Pakistani general election.
