= Rahila Durrani =

Pakistani lawyer and politician (born 1973)

Rahilla Durrani

14th Speaker of the Provincial Assembly of Balochistan
- In office 24 December 2015 – 16 August 2018
- Preceded by: Jan Mohammad Jamali
- Succeeded by: Abdul Quddus Bizenjo

Personal details
- Born: 17 February 1973 (age 53) Quetta, Balochistan, Pakistan
- Party: PMLN (2024-present)
- Occupation: Politician / lawyer

Rahila Hameed Khan Durrani (Urdu: راحیلہ حمید خان درانی) is a Pakistani lawyer and politician currently serving as an education minister in Balochistan. She was elected as the first ever female Speaker of the Provincial Assembly of Balochistan on 24 December 2015. She has served as the first member (from Balochistan) of National Commission on Status of Women (1999) and has worked a lot for the cause of women. She is a journalist, social activist, lawyer, sports woman. She was awarded Tamgha-i-Imtiaz (TI) by the Government of Pakistan.

== Early life ==
Durrani was born in Quetta in 1968. She received her M.A. and L.L.B. from the University of Balochistan. She was appointed a member of the Balochistan Assembly on a seat reserved for women as a member of the ruling Pakistan Muslim League (Q) party, and re-appointed in 2008 and 2013. She became Balochistan's Minister for Prosecution in her second term. She is a patron of Chiltan Adventurers Association Balochistan and the Pakistan Canoe and Kayak Federation She is Balochistan's first female athlete medal winner in canoeing sports on National level.

== See also ==
- List of members of the Provincial Assembly of Balochistan (2013–2018)
