= Orya Maqbool Jan =

Pakistani journalist

- اوریا مقبول جان
- Born: Gujrat, Punjab, Pakistan
- Education: University of Balochistan
- Occupations: former Civil servant, Advocate High court; drama writer; poet; columnist; anchorperson

YouTube information
- Channel: Orya Maqbool Jan
- Years active: 2018–present
- Subscribers: 1.19 million
- Views: 178 million
- Last updated: 25 April 2026
- Website: Archived website

Orya Maqbool Jan (Urdu: اوریا مقبول جان) is a Pakistani columnist, anchor, poet, playwright and former civil servant.

In the early 1990s he worked in Quetta station of PTV and worked in the production of TV dramas. He used to appear as an analyst on Neo News television show Harf-e-Raaz.

== Personal life ==
During an interview, Orya Maqbool Jan revealed that he had a love-marriage with a student at the college where he used to teach.

On 13 May 2023, he was arrested from his house in a crackdown on PTI leaders and their supporters.

== Professional career ==
Orya Maqbool Jan, a former civil servant who retied in BPS-21 grade, has had different postings in fields such as teaching, policy-making and administration, including being the Information Secretary to the Punjab Government.

== Controversies ==
In 2018, following Mehmood-ur-Rasheed suggestion of Jan as PTI's candidate for the post of Punjab caretaker chief minister, social media users criticized the party for considering Jan due to his controversial reputation. Subsequently, PTI spokesperson Fawad Chaudhry acknowledged that Jan's name had been brought up for discussion but later retracted the suggestion, ultimately dropping Jan from consideration for the position.

In 2018, his visa application to Norway was rejected due to his negative comments regarding the Ahmadiyya and Jewish communities.

While serving as a deputy commissioner in Balochistan, Jan was noted for his favorable portrayal of the Taliban.

In 2019, PEMRA imposed a 30-day ban on the airing of "Harf-i-Raaz" a program hosted by Jan on Neo TV, citing rule violations. Reports indicate that during the program, Jan made derogatory remarks about Pakhtuns and engaged in a conversation with a spokesperson for the Afghan Taliban, seeking their perspectives on Pakistan's domestic and foreign policies.

In 2021, reports emerged indicating that Jan was among the beneficiaries who received residential plots in Islamabad's F-14 and F-15 sectors. The Islamabad High Court expressed regret over the allotment of plots at subsidized rates, citing a potential loss of Rs1 trillion to the public exchequer.

He was known for frequently criticizing the Aurat March movement, suggesting that he believes the movement poses a threat to Islamic society.

In August 2024, he was detained by the Federal Investigation Agency in Lahore for making social media posts related to the Mubarak Sani case. He was arrested on allegations of hate speech and for allegedly making derogatory comments about state institutions.

== Books ==
Some of his publications include:

- Ḥarf-i Rāz, Lahore : Sang-e-Meel Publications, 2005–2013, 1616 p. (in 5 volumes). Essays on deteriorating political conditions in Pakistan.
- Qāmat : Shāʻirī, Lahore : Sang-e-Meel Publications, 2011, 144 p. Urdu poetry.
- Mujhe Hai Hukm-i Az̲ān̲ : Z̤arb-i-Muʼmin Shāʼiʻ Hone Vāle Kālam, Lahore : Ilm-o-Irfan Publishers, 2012, 336 p. Author's collected columns on various international political issues, published in weekly Z̤arb-i muʼmin Karachi during 2004–06.
