= Fateh Mohammad Buledi =

Pakistani politician

Member of the Provincial Assembly of Balochistan
- In office 10 October 2013 – 31 May 2018

Personal details
- Born: 15 August 1985 (age 40) Kech District
- Party: Nill

Fateh Mohammad Buledi is a Pakistani politician who was a member of the Provincial Assembly of Balochistan from October 2013 to May 2018. He is the son of the Baloch Nationalist Leader Shaheed Ayub Buledi.

== Early life ==
He was born on 15 August 1985 in Kech District. Fateh Muhammad Buledi completed his matriculation and intermediate from Punjab, and his Graduation from FC collage, Lahore. He is counted among the young politicians of Balochistan, who aim to solve the region's problems through modern and progressive methods. He believes that education should be made common in Turbat.

== Political career ==
He was elected unopposed to the Provincial Assembly of Balochistan as a candidate of the National Party from Constituency PB-49 Kech-II in by-polls held in October 2013.
