= 2013 Sindh provincial election =

Pakistani provincial election

- 11 May 2013

All 168 seats in the Provincial Assembly of the Sindh 85 seats needed for a majority
- Turnout: 54.62%(▲11.32%)
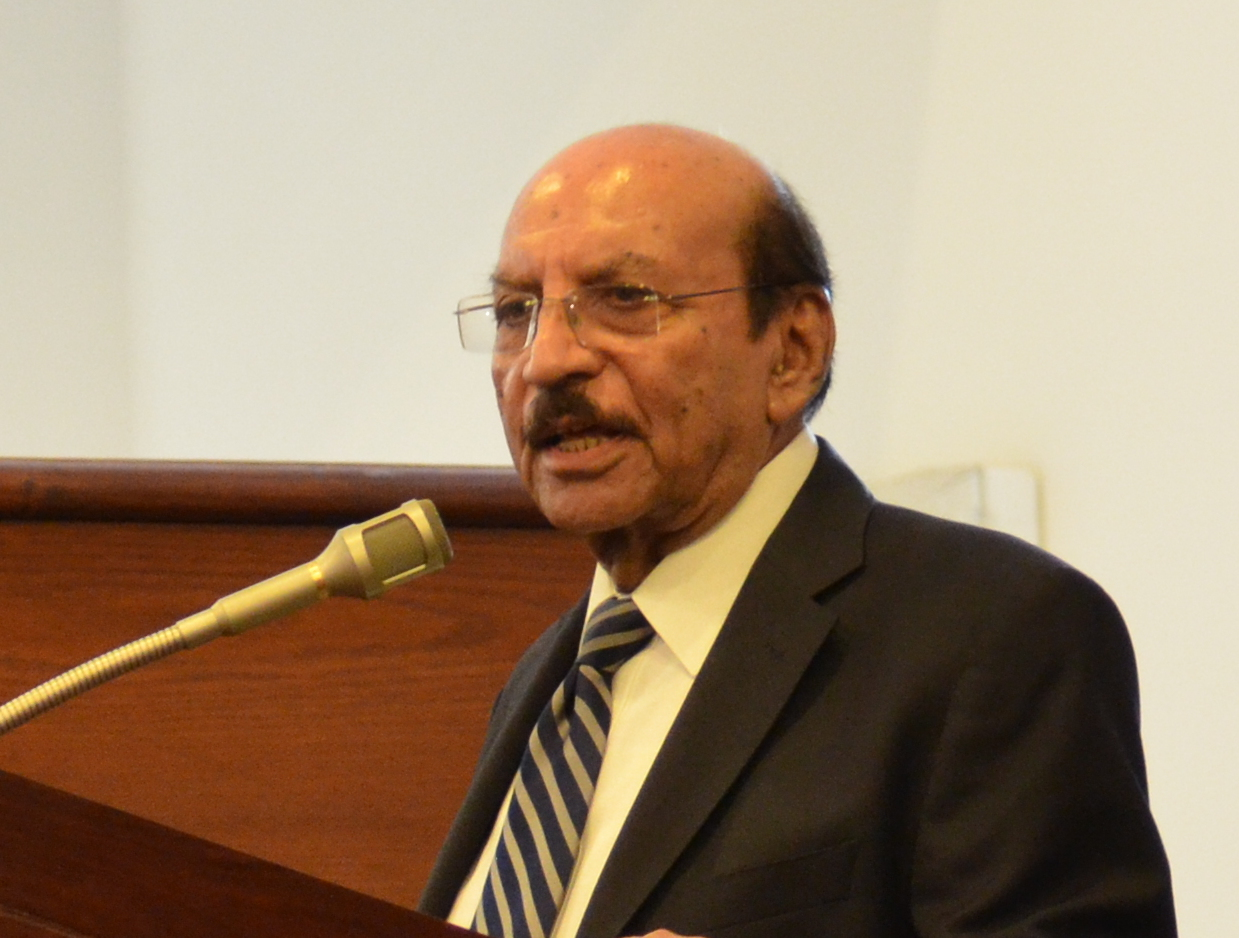

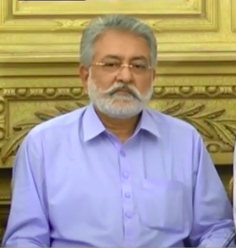
	First party	Second party	Third party
Leader	Qaim Ali Shah	Khawaja Izharul Hassan	Raja Saein
Party	PPP	MQM	PML(F)
Leader's seat	Khairpur-I	Karachi-XI	Khairpur-II
Last election	91 seats, 41.94%	51 seats, 30.10%	9 seats, 6.19%
Seats won	89	50	11
Seat change	▼2	▼1	▲2
Popular vote	3,209,686	2,510,853	1,138,400
Percentage	32.63%	25.53%	11.57%
Swing	▼9.31%	▼4.57%	▲5.38%
- Sindh Assembly Elections result. Expand to original file to view constituency labels.
Chief Minister before election
Qaim Ali Shah
PPP
Elected Chief Minister
Qaim Ali Shah
PPP

Provincial elections were held in the Pakistani province of Sindh to elect the members of the 12 Provincial Assembly of Sindh on 11 May 2013, alongside nationwide general elections and three other provincial elections in Khyber Pakhtunkhwa, Balochistan and Punjab. The remaining two territories of Pakistan, AJK and Gilgit-Baltistan, were ineligible to vote due to their disputed status.

The Pakistan Peoples Party, led by Syed Qaim Ali Shah, despite losing almost 10% of its vote, returned victorious in this election, losing only one seat overall.

== Background ==
Prior to this election, the Pakistan Peoples Party and Muttahida Qaumi Movement were in a coalition government with each other despite the fact that the PPP had enough seats to be able to form a government by themselves.

== Campaign ==
Overall, the election campaign for the Pakistan Peoples Party was based mainly on garnering support in Sindh, while the Muttahida Qaumi Movement campaign was mainly based in Karachi.

The Pakistan Peoples Party ran on the platform of praising the nationalisation and welfare programs since they took office in 2008, although the Muttahida Qaumi Movement campaigned more on the Muhajir Nationalist side.

== Results ==
Following the elections, the party positions in the assembly remained largely the same, with slight changes. New additions into the assembly included Pakistan Tehreek-e-Insaf, a welfarist, anti-establishment party led by former cricketer Imran Khan, who emerged as the second largest party in Karachi and gained 4 seats. Despite significant drops in the percentage vote share, the change in the assembly composition was not visible, and the Pakistan Peoples Party was able to form a government in Sindh for the ninth time in its existence.

91	51	11	4	4	7
PPP	MQM	PML(F)	PTI	PML(N)	OTH

=== Division-wise results ===
Division	Total seats	PPP	MQM	PML(F)	PTI	PML(N)	IND	Others
Sukkur	19	14	1	2	0	0	0	2
Larkana	18	16	0	2	0	0	0	0
Mirpur Khas	17	13	0	3	0	0	0	1
Hyderabad	34	25	4	0	0	0	5	0
Karachi	42	3	33	0	3	3	0	0
Total	130	71	38	7	3	3	5	3

=== District-wise results ===
Division	District	Total seats	PPP	MQM	PML(F)	PTI	PML(N)	IND	Others
Sukkur	Sukkur	4	3	1	0	0	0	0	0
Sukkur	Ghotki	4	4	0	0	0	0	0	0
Larkana	Shikarpur	4	2	0	2	0	0	0	0
Larkana	Jacobabad	3	3	0	0	0	0	0	0
Larkana	Kashmore	3	3	0	0	0	0	0	0
Sukkur	Naushahro Feroz	5	3	0	0	0	0	0	2
Hyderabad	Nawabshah	5	5	0	0	0	0	0	0
Sukkur	Khairpur	6	4	0	2	0	0	0	0
Larkana	Larkana	4	4	0	0	0	0	0	0
Larkana	Qambar Shahdadkot	4	4	0	0	0	0	0	0
Hyderabad	Matiari	2	2	0	0	0	0	0	0
Hyderabad	Hyderabad	6	2	4	0	0	0	0	0
Hyderabad	Tando Allahyar	2	2	0	0	0	0	0	0
Hyderabad	Tando Muhammad Khan	2	2	0	0	0	0	0	0
Hyderabad	Badin	5	5	0	0	0	0	0	0
Mirpur Khas	Tharparkar	4	3	0	0	0	0	0	1
Mirpur Khas	Mirpur Khas	4	4	0	0	0	0	0	0
Mirpur Khas	Umerkot	3	3	0	0	0	0	0	0
Hyderabad	Jamshoro	3	2	0	0	0	0	1	0
Hyderabad	Dadu	4	4	0	0	0	0	0	0
Mirpur Khas	Sanghar	6	3	0	3	0	0	0	0
Hyderabad	Thatta	5	1	0	0	0	0	4	0
Karachi	West	9	0	7	0	1	1	0	0
Karachi	Central	10	0	10	0	0	0	0	0
Karachi	South	6	2	2	0	2	0	0	0
Karachi	East	13	0	12	0	0	1	0	0
Karachi	Malir	4	1	2	0	0	1	0	0
Total		130	71	38	7	3	3	5	3
