= Syed Muhammad Raza =

Pakistani politician

Member of the Provincial Assembly of Balochistan
- In office 29 May 2013 – 31 May 2018

Personal details
- Born: 15 August 1968 (age 57) Quetta, Balochistan, Pakistan
- Party: MWM (2013-present)

Syed Muhammad Agha Raza is a Pakistani politician who was a Member of the Provincial Assembly of Balochistan from May 2013 to May 2018.

== Early life and education ==
He was born on 15 August 1968 in Quetta.

He has a degree in Master of Arts.

== Political career ==
He was elected to the Provincial Assembly of Balochistan as a candidate of Majlis Wahdat-e-Muslimeen from Constituency PB-2 Quetta-II in the 2013 Pakistani general election.

In January 2018, he was inducted into the provincial Balochistan cabinet of Chief Minister Abdul Quddus Bizenjo and was made Provincial Minister of Balochistan for Law and parliamentary affairs with the additional ministerial portfolios of prosecution, forest and wildlife, and Livestock and Dairy Development.
