= Abdul Quddus Bizenjo =

Pakistani politician

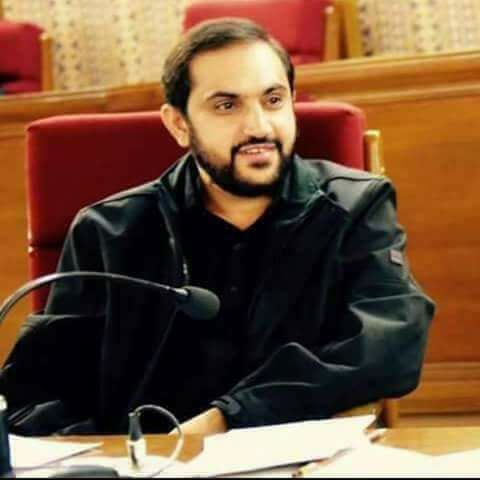

Chief Minister of Balochistan
- In office 29 October 2021 – 18 August 2023
- Governor: Syed Zahoor Ahmad Agha
- Preceded by: Jam Kamal Khan
- Succeeded by: Ali Mardan Khan Domki
- In office 13 January 2018 – 7 June 2018
- Governor: Muhammad Khan Achakzai
- Preceded by: Nawab Sanaullah Khan Zehri
- Succeeded by: Alauddin Marri (caretaker)

Speaker of the Provincial Assembly of Balochistan
- In office 16 August 2018 – 25 October 2021
- Deputy: Sardar Babar Khan Musakhel
- Preceded by: Rahila Durrani
- Succeeded by: Jan Mohammad Jamali

Deputy Speaker of the Provincial Assembly of Balochistan
- In office June 2013 – 2 December 2015
- Speaker: Jan Mohammad Jamali

Provincial Minister of Balochistan for Livestock and Dairy Development
- In office 2008–2013
- Chief Minister: Nawab Aslam Raisani
- In office 2002–2008
- Chief Minister: Jam Yousuf

Member of the Provincial Assembly of Balochistan
- In office 13 August 2018 – 12 August 2023
- Constituency: PB-44 (Awaran-cum-Panjgur)
- In office 2013 – 31 May 2018
- Constituency: PB-41 (Awaran)
- In office 2008–2013
- Constituency: PB-41 (Awaran)
- In office November 2002 – 2008
- Constituency: PB-41 (Awaran)

Personal details
- Born: 1 January 1970 (age 56) Awaran, Balochistan, Pakistan
- Party: PTI (2026-present)
- Other political affiliations: PPP (2023-2026); BAP (2018-2023); PML(Q) (2002-2018)
- Parent: Mir Abdul Majeed Bizenjo (father)

Mir Abdul Quddus Bizenjo (Urdu: میر عبد القدوس بزنجو; born 1 January 1970) is a Pakistani politician who served as the Chief Minister of Balochistan province of Pakistan from 29 October 2021 till 18 August 2023. He was a member of the Provincial Assembly of Balochistan. He was the former Party President of the Balochistan Awami Party.

Previously, he was a member of the Balochistan Assembly from November 2002 to May 2018. He served as the 16th Chief Minister of Balochistan from 13 January 2018 to 7 June 2018 and served as Deputy Speaker of the Provincial Assembly of Balochistan from 2013 to 2015. He served in the provincial Balochistan cabinet between 2002 and 2013, as the minister of livestock. He has been elected as chief minister of Balochistan on 29 October 2021.

== Early life and education ==
Bizenjo was born on 1 January 1970 in Awaran, Balochistan, Pakistan.

He did his early education from Shindi Jhao, his native town in Awaran District. In 2000, he received a master's degree in English from the University of Balochistan.

== Political career ==
Bizenjo was elected to the Provincial Assembly of Balochistan as a candidate of Pakistan Muslim League (Q) from Constituency PB-41 (Awaran) in the 2002 Pakistani general election by securing 9,492 votes. He served as provincial minister of Balochistan for livestock and dairy development in the provincial cabinet of Chief Minister Jam Mohammad Yousaf.

As per the Election Commission of Pakistan, he ran for the seat of Provincial Assembly of Balochistan as a candidate of Pakistan Muslim League (Q) from constituency PB-41 Awaran in the 2008 Pakistani general election but was unsuccessful and lost the seat to an independent candidate Mir Qamber Ali Ghicki. He had secured 8,456 votes.

He was re-elected to the Provincial Assembly of Balochistan as a candidate of Pakistan Muslim League (Q) from constituency PB-41 Awaran in the 2013 Pakistani general election. He secured 544 votes in a constituency where there were 57,666 registered voters. Geo News noted Bizenjo was elected to a legislative chamber by getting the fewest votes in the electoral history of the country.

In June 2013, he was elected as deputy speaker of the Provincial Assembly of Balochistan. After Speaker of the Provincial Assembly, Jan Mohammad Jamali resigned from his post in 2015 prior to a vote of no confidence against him, Bizenjo was named as a potential candidate to overtake Jamali as the succeeding Speaker however he could not. After Rahila Durrani was made the new Speaker by Chief Minister Nawab Sanaullah Khan Zehri belonging to ruling Pakistan Muslim League (N) (PML-N), Bizenjo tendered his resignation as the deputy speaker in December 2015.

On 2 January 2018, Bizenjo played a major role in the ouster of sitting Chief Minister Nawab Sanaullah Khan Zehri, after he along with some members of the Provincial Assembly submitted a motion of no confidence against Chief Minister Nawab Sanaullah Khan Zehri which triggered a political turmoil in the provincial assembly. Bizenjo was supported by dissent MPAs belonging to PML-N which led to the resignation of the Zehri and caused a major setback to PML-N ahead of the 2018 Senate election due to be held in March 2018. On 12 January, Bizenjo submitted his nomination paper for the office of chief ministership. Dawn in its editorial termed the election of Bizenjo for the office of chief ministership as "Undemocratic poll", noting how Bizenjo - who received 544 votes in the election - being the weakest candidate for the slot of chief ministership could become the "best" candidate.

On 13 January, Bizenjo was elected as the Chief Minister of Balochistan, securing 41 out of total 65 votes in the assembly including the votes of dissident MPAs of PML-N, a party considered to be the arch rival of PML-Q.

PML-N, which was the largest single party in the assembly with 21 members, failed to nominate its candidate for the post of chief minister. The Express Tribune in its editorial noted that in a significant move, PML-N "stood dislodged from the government of the province" after governing it for four and half years.

In his maiden speech, Bizenjo promised to make healthcare, education and clean drinking water his top priority during his term as Chief Minister of the Balochistan.

In March 2018, Bizenjo helped form a new political party, Balochistan Awami Party (BAP).

On 7 June 2018, Alauddin Marri was appointed by Election Commission of Pakistan to succeed Bizenjo as caretaker Chief Minister of Balochistan.

He was re-elected to the Provincial Assembly of Balochistan as a candidate of BAP from Constituency PB-44 (Awaran-cum-Panjgur) in 2018 Pakistani general election. He received 8,055 votes and defeated Khair Jan, a candidate of National Party. Following his successful election, he was nominated by BAP for the office of Speaker of the Provincial Assembly of Balochistan. On 16 August 2018, he was elected Speaker of Balochistan Assembly. He received 39 votes against his opponent Muhammad Nawaz Khan Kakar who secured 20 votes.

On 6 September 2018, he became acting governor of Balochistan following the resignation of Muhammad Khan Achakzai.

On 19 November 2018, he announced to resign as speaker of Balochistan Assembly. Later he didn't resign and continued in the office. He resigned as speaker on 25 October 2021.

On 29 October 2021, Bizenjo was elected unopposed as the chief minister of Balochistan.

Political offices Chief Minister of Balochistan
Preceded by Sanaullah Khan Zehri	1st term 2018-2018	Succeeded by Alauddin Marri (caretaker)
