= Anita Irfan =

Pakistani politician (born 1967)

Member of the Provincial Assembly of Balochistan
- In office 2 October 2016 – 31 May 2018
- Constituency: Reserved seat for minority

Personal details
- Born: 9 August 1967 (age 59)
- Party: Pakistan Muslim League (N)

Anita Irfan (Urdu: انتیہ عرفان; born 9 August 1967) is a Pakistani politician who was a Member of the Provincial Assembly of Balochistan from October 2016 to May 2018.

== Early life and education ==
Irfan was born on 9 August 1967.

She has a Bachelor of Art degree.

== Political career ==
Irfan was elected to the Provincial Assembly of Balochistan as a candidate of Pakistan Muslim League (N) on a reserved seat for minority in October 2016. The seat was vacated due to the de-seating of Santosh Kumar.
