= Mir Izhar Hussain Khosa =

Pakistani politician

Member of the Provincial Assembly of Balochistan
- In office 29 May 2013 – 31 May 2018

Personal details
- Party: Pakistan Muslim League (N)

Mir Izhar Hussain Khosa is a Pakistani politician who was a Member of the Provincial Assembly of Balochistan from May 2013 to May 2018.

== Personal life and education ==
He is a graduate and an agriculturist by profession.

== Political career ==
He ran for the seat of the Provincial Assembly of Balochistan as a candidate of Pakistan Muslim League (Q) from Constituency PB-28 Nasirabad-I in the 2008 Pakistani general election but was unsuccessful. He received 9,985 votes and lost the seat to a candidate of Pakistan Peoples Party (PPP).

He was elected to the Provincial Assembly of Balochistan as a candidate of Pakistan Muslim League (N) from Constituency PB-27 Jaffarabad-III in the 2013 Pakistani general election. He received 9,681 votes and defeated a candidate of PPP.

In February 2016, he was arrested by the National Accountability Bureau over corruption charges.
