= Hamid Khan Achakzai =

Pakistani politician

Dr. Hamid Khan Achakzai
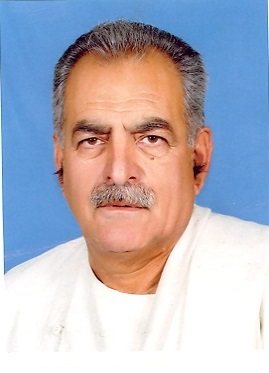
- MPA Balochistan Assembly
- Born: Gulistan, Balochistan
- Citizenship: Pakistan
- Education: MBBS
- Occupations: Politician, Doctor
- Years active: 30 years
- Known for: Politics, Activism, Nationalism
- Political party: Pakhtunkhwa Milli Awami Party
- Parent: Abdul Samad Khan Achakzai (father)
- Relatives: Muhammad Khan Achakzai (brother); Mahmood Khan Achakzai (brother)

Dr. Hamid Khan Achakzai (Pashto: حامد خان اڅکزی; Urdu: حامد خان اچکزئی) is a Pakistani politician and doctor from Balochistan affiliated with the Pakhtunkhwa Milli Awami Party.

== Family ==
He is a son of the Pashtun nationalist leader Abdul Samad Khan Achakzai. His elder brother Muhammad Khan Achakzai is the former Governor of Balochistan while his other elder brother, Mahmood Khan Achakzai, is a veteran politician and leader of Pakhtunkhwa Milli Awami Party.

His nephew Abdul Majeed Khan Achakzai is also a politician, serving as a member of the Balochistan provincial assembly from 2002 to 2007 and elected Again in General elections of 2013 as MPA from provincial constituency PB-13.

== Professional career ==
Having earned his MBBS from the Dow Medical College, Karachi before entering politics he worked as a medical doctor in the United Kingdom and Malta.

== Political career ==
In the general election of 1993, Hamid Khan Achakzai was elected into the National Assembly of Pakistan from the NA-198 constituency, serving as a parliamentarian until the end of the assembly's tenure in 1996. He later also became a member of the Provincial Assembly of Balochistan in 1999.
