= Mir Amir Rind =

Pakistani politician

Member of the Provincial Assembly of Balochistan
- In office 29 May 2013 – 31 May 2018

Personal details
- Party: Pakistan Muslim League (N)

Mir Amir Rind is a Pakistani politician who was a Member of the Provincial Assembly of Balochistan from May 2013 to May 2018.

== Education ==
He has a degree in Bachelor of Arts.

== Political career ==
He was elected to the Provincial Assembly of Balochistan as an independent candidate from Constituency PB-31 Bolan-II in the 2013 Pakistani general election. He received 26,775 votes and defeated an independent candidate, Mir Ghulam Mujtaba Murad Abro.
