= Sardar Raza Muhammad Barrech =

Pakistani politician

Member of the Provincial Assembly of Balochistan
- In office 29 May 2013 – 31 May 2018

Personal details
- Born: 19 April 1941 (age 84) Quetta
- Party: Pashtunkhwa Milli Awami Party

Sardar Raza Muhammad Barrech is a Pakistani politician who was a Member of the Provincial Assembly of Balochistan from May 2013 to May 2018.

== Early life and education ==
He was born on 19 April 1941 in Quetta.

He has a degree in Master of Arts and a degree in the Bachelors of Laws.

== Political career ==
He was elected to the Provincial Assembly of Balochistan as a candidate of Pashtunkhwa Milli Awami Party from Constituency PB-4 Quetta-IV in the 2013 Pakistani general election.
