= Masooma Hayat =

Pakistani politician

Member of the Provincial Assembly of Balochistan
- In office 29 May 2013 – 31 May 2018
- Constituency: Reserved seat for women

Personal details
- Born: 15 March 1980 (age 46) Quetta, Balochistan, Pakistan
- Party: Pashtunkhwa Milli Awami Party

Masooma Hayat (Urdu: معصومہ حیات; born 15 March 1980) is a Pakistani politician who was a Member of the Provincial Assembly of Balochistan from May 2013 to May 2018.

== Early life and education ==
Hayat was born on 15 March 1980 in Quetta, Balochistan, Pakistan.

She has the degree of Master of Science and the degree of the Master of Education.

== Political career ==
She was elected to the Provincial Assembly of Balochistan as a candidate of Pashtunkhwa Milli Awami Party on a reserved seat for women in the 2013 Pakistani general election.
