= Samina Khan =

Pakistani politician

Member of the Provincial Assembly of Balochistan
- In office 29 May 2013 – 31 May 2018
- Constituency: Reserved seat for women

Personal details
- Born: 20 December 1970 (age 55) Kalat, Pakistan
- Party: Pakistan Muslim League (N)

Samina Khan (Urdu: سمینہ خان; born 20 December 1970) is a Pakistani politician who was a Member of the Provincial Assembly of Balochistan from May 2013 to May 2018.

== Early life and education ==
Khan was born on 20 December 1970 in Kalat, Pakistan.

Khan holds a degree of the Master of Public Administration.

== Political career ==
She was elected to the Provincial Assembly of Balochistan as a candidate of Pakistan Muslim League (N) on a reserved seat for women in the 2013 Pakistani general election.
