= 2013 Khyber Pakhtunkhwa provincial election =

Pakistani provincial election

← 2008	11 May 2013	2018 →

All 124 seats in the Provincial Assembly 63 seats needed for a majority
- Turnout: 44.74%(▲11.28%)
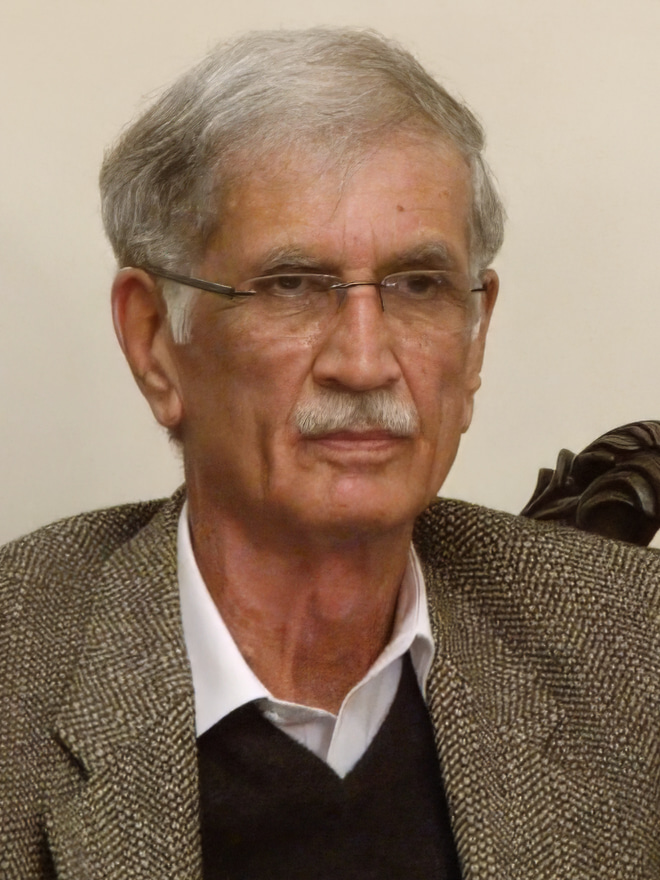

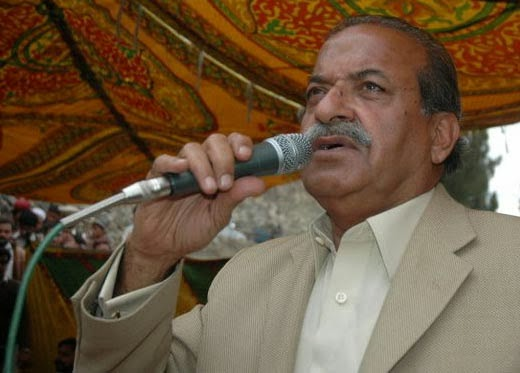
	First party	Second party	Third party
Leader	Pervez Khattak	Maulana Lutfur Rehman	Mehtab Abbasi
Party	PTI	JUI (F)	PML(N)
Leader's seat	Nowshera-II	Dera Ismail Khan-III	Did not contest
Last election	Did not contest	14 seats, 14.63%	9 seats, 12.83%
Seats won	48	16	15
Seat change	▲48	▲2	▲6
Popular vote	1,039,719	733,777	856,135
Percentage	19.31%	13.63%	15.90%
Swing	▲19.31%	▼1.00%	▲3.07%
- Results by constituency
Chief Minister before election
Ameer Haider Khan Hoti
ANP
Elected Chief Minister
Pervez Khattak
PTI

Provincial elections were held in the Pakistani province of Khyber Pakhtunkhwa to elect the members of the 10th Provincial Assembly of Khyber Pakhtunkhwa on 11 May 2013, alongside nationwide general elections and three other provincial elections in Sindh, Balochistan and Punjab. The remaining two territories of Pakistan, AJK and Gilgit-Baltistan, were ineligible to vote due to their disputed status.

== Background ==
In the 2008 elections, the ANP, a secular, leftist and Pashtun nationalist party, won the elections, prompting them to form a coalition government with the centre-left Pakistan Peoples Party.

This coalition government was said to be riddled with corruption and poor governance, leading to common mistrust with the government.

== Campaign ==
Overall throughout the campaign, there were three main contenders: Awami National Party, the party in government for the past five years; the Jamiat Ulema-e-Islam (F), a religious party or the Pakistan Tehreek-e-Insaf, a welfarist, centrist party led by former cricketer Imran Khan.

Opinion polls were consistently showing that Pakistan Tehreek-e-Insaf were making deep inroads into the province of Khyber Pakhtunkhwa, being close to even forming a government.

The parties campaigned on multiple different policy platforms: Pakistan Tehreek-e-Insaf campaigned on a Third Way, Welfarist and anti-establishment platform, attempting to attract disillusioned voters of mainstream parties; the Jamiat Ulema-e-Islam (F) campaigned on religious issues such as the enforcement of Islamic Law and the Pakistan Muslim League (N) mainly campaigned against the leftist policies of the federal PPP government and vowed to tackle the energy conservation crisis.

== Results ==
Pakistan Tehreek-e-Insaf, led by former cricketer Imran Khan emerged as the largest party in the province with 48 seats. While this was a considerably higher number than the second largest party, (Jamiat Ulema-e-Islam (F), with 16 seats), it was still 15 seats short of a majority government.

Party	Votes	%	Seats				
Party	Votes	%	General	Independents joined	Reserved for women	Reserved for non-Muslims	Total
Pakistan Tehreek-e-Insaf	1,039,719	19.31	38	9	10	1	58
Pakistan Muslim League (N)	856,135	15.90	11	1	3	1	16
Jamiat Ulema-e-Islam (F)	733,777	13.63	11	–	3	1	15
Jamaat-e-Islami	404,895	7.52	7	–	1	–	8
Qaumi Watan Party	193,964	3.60	7	1	2	–	10
Awami National Party	556,625	10.34	4	–	1	–	5
Pakistan People's Party	472,550	8.78	3	–	1	–	4
Awami Jamhuri Ittehad Pakistan	63,497	1.18	3	1	1	–	5
All Pakistan Muslim League	21,933	0.41	1	–	–	–	1
Other parties	171,949	3.19	–	–	–	–	0
Independents	867,989	16.12	14	-12	–	–	2
Total	5,383,033	100.00	99	0	22	3	124
Registered voters/turnout	12,052,203	–					
Source: ECP, ECP

== Aftermath ==
Following the elections, Pakistan Tehreek-e-Insaf formed a coalition government with Jamaat-e-Islami and the Qaumi Watan Party, giving them 15 extra seats. As well as this, 9 out of the 14 independents elected joined PTI, giving them a comfortable majority in the assembly.

Following this, Pervez Khattak was elected as Chief Minister of Khyber Pakhtunkhwa, securing 84 out of 124 votes.
