= Shahida Rauf =

Pakistani politician

Member of the Provincial Assembly of Balochistan
- Incumbent
- Assumed office 29 February 2024
- Constituency: Reserved seat for women
- In office 9 October 2002 – 31 May 2018

Personal details
- Born: 15 January 1970 (age 56) Quetta, Balochistan, Pakistan
- Party: JUI (F) (2013-present)

Shahida Rauf (Urdu: شاہدہ روف; born 15 January 1970) is a Pakistani politician who is incumbent Member of the Provincial Assembly of Balochistan since 18 February 2024. Previously she was a Member of the Provincial Assembly of Balochistan, from October 2002 to May 2018.

== Early life and education ==
Rauf was born on 15 January 1977 in Quetta.

She holds the degree of the Bachelor of Science which she obtained in 1998.

== Political career ==
Rauf was elected to the Provincial Assembly of Balochistan as a candidate of Muttahida Majlis-e-Amal on a reserved seat for women in the 2002 Pakistani general election. She served as Advisor to Chief Minister of Balochistan on Health from 2002 to 2007.

She was re-elected to the Provincial Assembly of Balochistan as a candidate of Jamiat Ulema-e Islam (F) (JUI-F) on a reserved seat for women in the 2008 Pakistani general election.

She was re-elected to the Provincial Assembly of Balochistan as a candidate of JUI-F on a reserved seat for women in the 2013 Pakistani general election.

She was re-elected to the Provincial Assembly of Balochistan as a candidate of JUI-F on a reserved seat for women in the 2024 Pakistani general election.
