= Tahir Mahmood Khan =

Pakistani politician (1956–2025)

- Born: 24 April 1956; Quetta, West Pakistan, Pakistan
- Died: 23 February 2025 (aged 68); Karachi, Sindh, Pakistan
- Political party: Pakistan Muslim League (N)

Member of the Balochistan Provincial Assembly for PB-1 Quetta-I
- In office May 2013 – May 2018

Tahir Mahmood Khan (Urdu: طاہر محمود خان; 24 April 1956 – 23 February 2025) was a Pakistani politician who was a member of the Provincial Assembly of Balochistan from May 2013 to May 2018.

== Life and career ==
Khan was born on 24 April 1956 in Quetta, and had a degree in Master of Arts and a degree in the Bachelor of Laws. He was elected to the Provincial Assembly of Balochistan as a candidate of Pakistan Muslim League (N) from Constituency PB-1 Quetta-I in the 2013 Pakistani general election. He died in Karachi, Sindh on 23 February 2025, at the age of 68.
