= Rakhshani, Hirmand =

Rakhshani رخشاني
- Village
- Location within Iran
- Coordinates: 31°05′26″N 61°46′44″E
- Country: Iran
- Province: Sistan and Baluchestan
- County: Hirmand
- Bakhsh: Central
- Rural District: Dust Mohammad

Population (2006)
  - Total: 33
- Time zone: UTC+3:30 (IRST)
  - Summer (DST): UTC+4:30 (IRDT)

Rakhshani (Balochi: بلوچ) (Persian: رخشاني, also Romanized as Rakhshānī) is a village in Dust Mohammad Rural District, in the Central District of Hirmand County, Sistan and Baluchestan Province, Iran. It lies near the border with Afghanistan. At the 2006 census, its population was 33, in 8 families.
