= Kishwar Ahmed =

Pakistani politician

Member of the Provincial Assembly of Balochistan
- In office 29 May 2013 – 31 May 2018
- Constituency: Reserved seat for women

Personal details
- Born: 15 November 1976 (age 49) Quetta, Balochistan, Pakistan
- Party: Pakistan Muslim League (N)

Kishwar Ahmed (Urdu: کشور احمد; born 15 November 1976) is a Pakistani politician who was a Member of the Provincial Assembly of Balochistan, from May 2013 to May 2018.

== Early life ==
Ahmed was born on 15 November 1976 in Quetta, Balochistan, Pakistan.

== Political career ==
She was elected to the Provincial Assembly of Balochistan as a candidate of Pakistan Muslim League (N) on a reserved seat for women in 2013 Pakistani general election.
