= Abdul Malik Baloch =

Pakistani senator

Doctor Abdul Malik Baloch
- عبدالمالک بلوچ
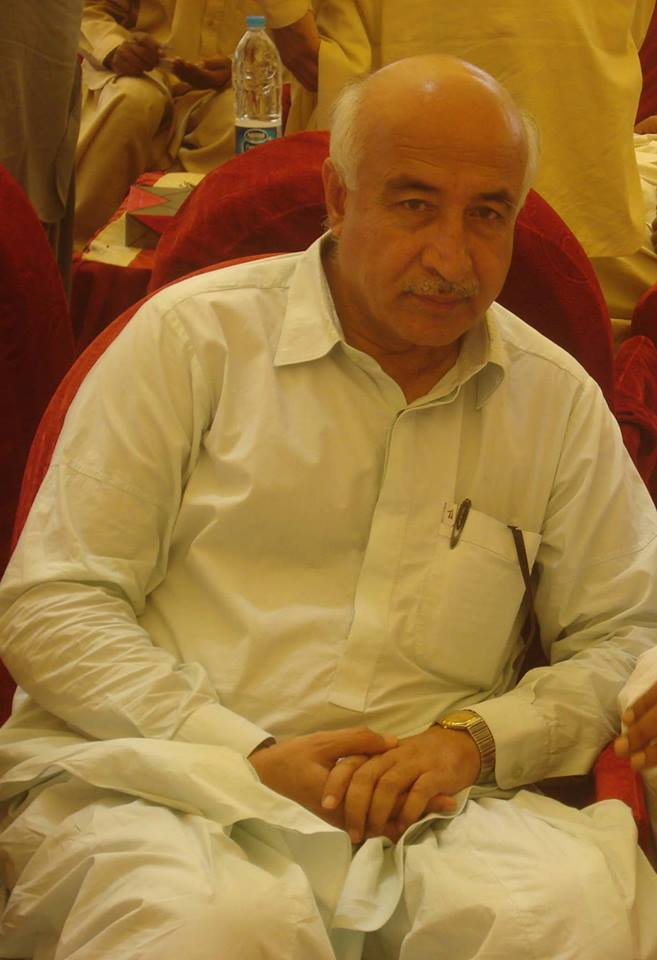
- Abdul Malik Baloch

21st Chief Minister of Balochistan
- In office 7 June 2013 – 23 December 2015
- President: Mamnoon Hussain
- Prime Minister: Nawaz Sharif
- Governor: Muhammad Khan Achakzai
- Preceded by: Nawab Ghous Bakhsh Barozai
- Succeeded by: Sanaullah Zehri

Member of the Provincial Assembly of Balochistan
- Incumbent
- Assumed office 29 February 2024
- Constituency: PB-26 Kech
- In office 2013–2018
- Constituency: PB-48 Kech
- In office 2008–2013
- Constituency: PB-48 Kech
- In office 1993–1996
- Constituency: PB-37 Turbat
- In office 1990–1993
- Constituency: PB-37 Turbat
- In office 1988–1990
- Constituency: PB-37 Turbat

Provincial Minister of Balochistan for Planning and Development
- In office 2008–2013
- Chief Minister: Nawab Aslam Raisani

Provincial Minister of Balochistan for Education
- In office 1993–1996
- Chief Minister: Zulfiqar Ali Magsi

Provincial Minister of Balochistan for Health
- In office 1988–1990
- Chief Minister: Nawab Akbar Bugti

Personal details
- Born: 15 January 1958 (age 68) Turbat, Balochistan, Pakistan, Pakistan
- Citizenship: Pakistan Pakistani
- Party: NP (2003-present)
- Other political affiliations: Baloch National Movement (1988-2003)
- Education: Bolan University of Medical & Health Sciences

Abdul Malik Baloch (Urdu: عبدالمالک بلوچ—ʿAbdu l-Mālik Balōč) is a politician and served as the 21st Chief Minister of Balochistan, Pakistan from 7 June 2013 to 23 December 2015. He was born in Turbat District, Makran and he is a member of the Hooth tribe.

He is the president of National Party. He was the first non-tribal leader to serve as Chief Minister of Balochistan. Malik was succeeded by Sanaullah Zehri, leader of the Zehri tribe, upon Malik's resignation in accordance with the Murree political power sharing agreement.

Baloch campaigned to root out corruption from the province. He has a good relationship with the federal government and has taken on several companies from federal to Baloch government, hoping to increase provincial revenues.

Baloch also favours peace talks with militants in his province. Levels of violence and targeted killings declined relative to previous governments while the construction of electricity and roads upgraded Balochistan's infrastructure. This came as Balochistan had most of its development released, a first in Pakistani history.

== Early life ==
He received his early education from a local school in Turbat and his intermediate education from Ata Shad Degree College, also in Turbat. He went on to pursue his MBBS degree at Bolan Medical College. He specialized in ophthalmology.

== Political career ==
Baloch started his political career under the platform of Baloch Student Organization (BSO). Later in 1988, with the collaboration of his senior political fellows he established a nationalist political party, Balochistan National Movement. He contested election the same year. He won his Balochistan National Assembly seat and became the provincial health minister in Nawab Akbar Khan Bugti's cabinet. He also served as the provincial education minister in 1993.

In 2004, the followers of Mir Ghaus Bakhsh Bizenjo merged with the BNM and became the National Party. He was elected to the senate in 2006.

He has worked as a member of various standing committees of the Senate, including the committees on minorities affairs, ports and shipping, and food and agriculture. He was the chairman of the 'Functional Committee on Problems of Less Developed Areas'. In 2008, he was elected as President of National Party. He became Chief Minister of Balochistan on 7 June 2013.

=== Health Minister (1988-1990) ===
He served as provincial health minister in 1988–1990. Malik is a medical doctor and eye specialist, he has got the degree of MBBS from Bolan Medical College Quetta. He has been very active in his efforts for the betterment of education and health services in Balochistan.

=== Education Minister (1993-1996) ===
In 1993, he was appointed education minister. During his tenure he established a network of schools and colleges in Balochistan, focusing on Makran.

=== Minister for Planning (2008-2013) ===
In 2008, he was appointed planning minister. During his tenure he established a strategy for Balochistan, focusing on Health and Education.

=== Chief Minister (2013-2015) ===
Baloch was elected CM with a strong mandate from his own party and the PkMAP. After beginning his tenure as Chief Minister he began to preside over reforms such as in the field of health where in July 2013 he dismissed all absentee doctors from the Chaman Civil Hospital after making a surprise visit, reprimanded the hospital for poor sanitation and promised an investigation into the selling of prescribed medicine by hospital staff illegally.

== Work towards provincial autonomy ==
Baloch has been a member of the Parliamentary Committee on Constitutional Reforms which has introduced Eighteen Constitutional Amendment in the 1973 Constitution of Pakistan which inserted provincial autonomy in the Eighteen Constitutional Amendment.
