= Sanaullah Khan Zehri =

Pakistani politician (born 1961)

- ثناء اللہ خان زہری

15th Chief Minister of Balochistan
- In office 24 December 2015 – 9 January 2018
- President: Mamnoon Hussain
- Prime Minister: Nawaz Sharif
- Governor: Muhammad Khan Achakzai
- Preceded by: Abdul Malik Baloch
- Succeeded by: Abdul Quddus Bizenjo

Senior Minister of Balochistan
- In office 7 June 2013 – 24 December 2015
- President: Mamnoon Hussain
- Prime Minister: Nawaz Sharif
- Governor: Muhammad Khan Achakzai
- Chief Minister: Abdul Malik Baloch

Member of Senate of Pakistan (Senator)
- In office March 1997 – March 2000
- Constituency: Balochistan, Pakistan

Member of the Provincial Assembly of Balochistan
- In office 13 August 2018 – 12 August 2023
- Constituency: PB-38 Khuzdar-I
- In office 2013–2018
- Constituency: PB-33 Khuzdar-I
- In office 2008–2013
- Constituency: PB-33 Khuzdar-I
- In office 2002–2007
- Constituency: PB-33 Khuzdar-I
- In office 1993–1996
- Constituency: PB-30 Khuzdar-I
- In office 1990–1993
- Constituency: PB-30 Khuzdar-I
- In office 1988–1990
- Constituency: PB-30 Khuzdar-I

Personal details
- Born: 4 August 1961 (age 65) Khuzdar, Balochistan, Pakistan
- Citizenship: Pakistani
- Party: PPP (2020-present)
- Other political affiliations: PMLN (2010–2020); NP (2001–2010); PMLN (1997–2001); NP (1990–1997); IND (1988–1990)
- Children: Sikander Khan Zehri (Son); Hamza Khan Zehri (Son); Izbal Zehri (Daughter); Ayesha Zehri (Daughter)
- Parent: Doda Khan Zehri (father)
- Education: University of Balochistan (BA)
- Profession: Politician, chief of Jhalawan, Sardar of Zehri(Baloch) tribe
- Cabinet: Government of Balochistan, Pakistan

Sardar Sanaullah Khan Zehri (Urdu: نواب ثناء اللہ خان زہری; born 4 August 1961) is a Pakistani politician who had been the Chief Minister of Balochistan from 24 December 2015 to 9 December 2017. He belongs to Channal Zarakzai family and is also the Sardar of the Zehri tribe and chief of Jhalawan. Zehri was the central president of the Pakistan Muslim League's Balochistan branch and a confidant of former Prime Minister Nawaz Sharif. He left the PML-N on 7 November 2020.

On 7 June 2013, Zehri was appointed senior minister of Balochistan with portfolios of communication works, mines, minerals. On 9 January 2018, due to the imminence of a no-confidence vote against him, Zehri resigned from his post as chief minister to prevent the brewing of a political crisis.

== Biography ==
Sanaullah Khan Zehri was born in Anjeera in the Khuzdar District, Balochistan, Pakistan, on 4 August 1961. His father, Sardar Doda Khan Zehri, was a tribal leader and an activist in the Pakistan Movement who played a crucial role in gathering Balochistan's support for the cause of Pakistan. He graduated with a BA degree in political science in 1983 from the University of Balochistan.

Upon graduating from Balochistan University, he ran in the 1990 Balochistan Assembly general election, performing well on the PML(N)'s conservative platform. During this time, he campaigned for local government in Balochistan. In 1997, he contested and triumphed in a senate election, representing Balochistan until 1999. Zehri ran for the PB-50 (Khuzdar-I) constituency on the National Party's platform during the 2002 general election. He served as the provincial minister of prisons and tribal affairs until 2003.

In 2008, the National Party boycotted the general election. Zehri disagreed with the move, leaving the party, and in February he won a seat in the assembly under his own, newly founded the National Party.In September 2006, Zehri participated in a loya jirga called by the Khan of Kalat, Mir Suleman Dawood Jan, following the death of Akbar Bugti.

On 6 January 2010, he joined the Pakistan Muslim League. In August 2011, Baloch was selected by PML(N) as the assistant secretary general of the PML-N for Balochistan.

In 2013, Zehri defended his constituency on PML-N's platform and was initially named as candidacy for Chief Minister of Balochistan. However, Prime Minister Nawaz Sharif instead approved the appointment of Abdul Malik Baloch as the chief minister of Balochistan.

On 16 April 2013, Zehri escaped an assassination attempt on his life when his convoy came under a bomb attack in his native Khuzdar district. The attack killed his son, Sikander Zehri, brother Mir Meharullah Zehri and nephew Mir Zaid. The Balochistan Liberation Army (BLA), claimed responsibility for the attack on Zehri.

On 23 November 2020, Sanaullah lost his daughter Ayesha Zehri, allegedly due to COVID-19.
