= Spozmi Achakzai =

Pakistani politician

Member of the Provincial Assembly of Balochistan
- In office 29 May 2013 – 31 May 2018
- Constituency: Reserved seat for women

Personal details
- Born: 11 April 1964 (age 62) Quetta, Balochistan, Pakistan
- Party: Pashtunkhwa Milli Awami Party

Spozmi Achakzai (Pashto: سپوږمۍ اڅکزۍ; Urdu: سپوزمی اچکزئی) is a Pakistani politician who was a Member of the Provincial Assembly of Balochistan from May 2013 to May 2018.

== Early life and education ==
She was born on 11 April 1964 in Quetta.

She holds the degree of the Master of Arts in Sociology and an associate degree in Sociology.

== Political career ==
She was elected to the Provincial Assembly of Balochistan as a candidate of Pashtunkhwa Milli Awami Party (PkMAP) on a reserved seat for women in the 2002 Pakistani general election.

She was re-elected to the Provincial Assembly of Balochistan as a candidate of PkMAP on a reserved seat for women in 2013 Pakistani general election.
