= Mahmood Khan Achakzai =

Pakistani politician (born 1948)

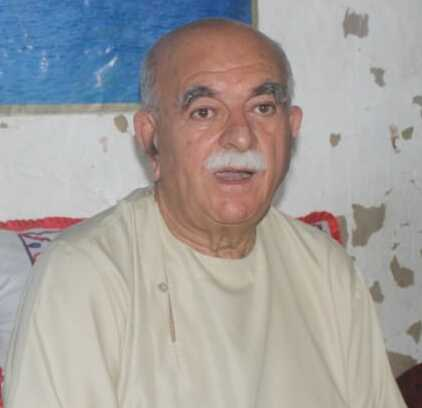

Chairman of PkMAP
- Incumbent
- Assumed office 1989

23rd Leader of the Opposition in the National Assembly of Pakistan
- Incumbent
- Assumed office 16 January 2026
- Preceded by: Omar Ayub

Member of the National Assembly of Pakistan
- Incumbent
- Assumed office 29 February 2024
- Constituency: NA-266 Killa Abdullah-cum-Chaman
- In office 1 June 2013 – 31 May 2018
- Constituency: NA-259 (Quetta)
- In office 18 November 2002 – 18 November 2007
- Constituency: NA-262 (Killa Abdullah)
- In office 16 October 1993 – 5 November 1996
- Constituency: NA-197 Quetta-cum-Chagai
- In office 17 October 1990 – 25 May 1993
- Constituency: NA-197 Quetta-cum-Chagai

Personal details
- Born: 14 December 1948 (age 77) Quetta, Baluchistan, Pakistan
- Party: PkMAP (1989-present)
- Relations: Muhammad Khan Achakzai (brother); Hamid Khan Achakzai (brother)
- Parent: Abdul Samad Khan Achakzai (father)
- Education: University of Engineering and Technology, Peshawar

Mahmud Khan Achakzai (Pashto: محمود خان اڅکزی; born 14 December 1948) is a Pakistani Pashtun regionalist politician who is the Chairman of Pashtunkhwa Milli Awami Party. Achakzai completed his Engineering degree from the Peshawar University of Engineering and Technology. In the 7th National Congress of Pashtunkhwa Milli Awami Party on 19 and 20 December 2022 Mahmood Khan Achakzai was re elected as the Chairman of PkMAP. He has been serving as member of the National Assembly of Pakistan since 29 February 2024. On 16 January 2026, he began serving as the leader of the opposition in the National Assembly of Pakistan after being nominated by former Prime Minister Imran Khan.

== Early life and education ==
Achakzai was born on 14 December 1948 to Abdul Samad Khan Achakzai. He received BSc degree in Civil Engineering from University of Engineering and Technology, Peshawar in 1971.

== Political career ==
Achakzai is a Pashtun nationalist who was elected as the chairman of the Pashtunkhwa National Awami Party (PNAP) following the assassination of his father Abdul Samad Khan Achakzai in a bomb attack in Quetta in 1973. PNAP and the Pakhtunkhwa Mazdoor Kisan Party (PMKP) of Sher Ali Bacha reached an agreement in 1986. As a result of this settlement, the Pashtunkhwa Milli Awami Party (PMAP) was created in March 1989 at a meeting in Quetta. Bacha was elected as the General Secretary of PMAP while Mahmood Khan Achakzai was the chairman.

Achakzai was elected as a member of the Provincial Assembly of Balochistan in a by election after the death of his father in 1974. Later Mehmood Khan Achakzai was elected as a member of National Assembly of Pakistan in the 1990 Pakistani general election from Quetta constituency.

Achakzai was re-elected as a member of National Assembly of Pakistan in the 1993 Pakistani general election from Quetta constituency. Reportedly, he had won this election with the support of Pakistan Muslim League (N). Achakzai lost the National Assembly seat in the 1997 Pakistani general election.

Achakzai was re-elected as a member of National Assembly of Pakistan in the 2002 Pakistani general election from the NA- 262 constituency however lost in the NA-259 (Quetta) constituency. In 2007, Achakzai parted ways with his ally PML-N and formed an alliance with the Awami National Party. In 2008, he formed an alliance with All Parties Democratic Movement and boycotted 2008 Pakistani general election to deny the legitimacy of then President of Pakistan Pervez Musharraf. Although he boycotted the polls, he remained active in the politics.

In February 2013, it was reported that Achakzai is being considered for the post of caretaker prime minister of Pakistan prior to the 2013 Pakistani general election, but he refused to become the caretaker prime minister due to reason that he intended to contest the upcoming general elections.

Achakzai ran for seat of National Assembly from two constituencies, NA-259-Quetta and NA-262-Qilla Abdullah, in the 2013 Pakistani general election.

From 11 to 14 March 2022, he was part of the Pashtun National Jirga, which was held in Bannu, Khyber Pakhtunkhwa to discuss the critical issues faced by the Pashtuns in Pakistan and Afghanistan.

In the 2024 Pakistani general elections, Achakzai contested and won the NA-266 seat, making it the only seat the PKMAP managed to secure in the election season. Achakzai also contested for the 2024 Pakistani presidential elections. His candidacy was backed by the SIC. He lost to Asif Ali Zardari, who secured 411 electoral votes compared to Achakzai's 181 votes.

== See also ==
- Pashtun nationalism
