= Manzoor Ahmed Kakar =

Pakistani politician

Member of the Senate of Pakistan
- Incumbent
- Assumed office March 2021
- Constituency: Balochistan
- In office January 2019 – March 2021
- Preceded by: Sardar Muhammad Azam Khan Musakhel
- Constituency: Balochistan

Member of the Provincial Assembly of Balochistan
- In office 29 May 2013 – March 2018

Personal details
- Born: 1 May 1971 (age 54) Quetta, Balochistan, Pakistan
- Party: BAP (2018-present)
- Other political affiliations: PkMAP (2013)

Manzoor Ahmed Kakar is a Pakistani politician who has been a member of the Senate of Pakistan from January 2019 till March 2021 and again since March 2021. He was also a Member of the Provincial Assembly of Balochistan, from May 2013 to March 2018. He has also served as Provincial Minister of Revenue. He is currently holding the portfolio of General Secretary of the BAP.

== Early life and education ==
Born in Quetta on 1 May 1971, Kakar holds degrees in Master of Arts and Bachelor of Laws. He is an advocate by profession.

== Political career ==
He was elected to the Provincial Assembly of Balochistan as a candidate of Pashtunkhwa Milli Awami Party from Constituency PB-6 Quetta-VI in the 2013 Pakistani general election. He received 18,062 votes and defeated a candidate of Jamiat Ulema-e Islam (F).

In March 2018, the Election Commission of Pakistan disqualified him as Member of the Provincial Assembly of Balochistan for crossing the floor.

As reported by senior Pakistani journalist Matiullah Jan, on June 5, 2024, to show support to senator Faisal Vawda, Kakar attended a contempt of court proceeding along with several other parliamentarians. Presumably, it was at the direction of the Pakistan Army that runs the hybrid regime in that country. Kakar was elected to the National assembly under that controversial system in a rigged 2024 election.
