= Yousaf Aziz Magsi =

Pakistani politician

Nawab Mir Yousaf Aziz Magsi was a Baloch leader and co-founder of the Anjuman-e-Ittehad-e-Balochan-wa-Balochistan alongside Abdul Aziz Kurd. In 2011, a commemorative seminar was held at the National Language Authority in Islamabad.

== See also ==
- Baloch
- Balochistan
- Zulfikar Ali Magsi
- Ataullah Mengal
- Mir Gul Khan Naseer
- Khair Bakhsh Marri
- Balach Marri
