= Abdul Aziz Kurd =

Pakistani politician (1904–1979)

Abdul Aziz Kurd (1904–1979) was a co-founder of the Anjuman-e-Ittehad-e-Balochan-wa-Balochistan. Among the pioneering Baloch nationalists, he wished to establish an independent Balochistan.

Kurd was born to a civil servant in the Khanate of Kalat and was among the handful of Balochs to receive an education. Baloch nationalists allege that he established an underground movement — Young Baloch — in the 1920s, for the initiation of representative democracy in the Khanate, borrowing from the Young Turk Revolution. Martin Axmann finds such claims to lack relevant archival evidence and suspicious in light of Kurd's young age but nonetheless plausible in an atmosphere rife with anti-imperialism.

Sometime around 1930, Kurd co-founded the Anjuman-e-Ittehad-e-Balochan-wa-Balochistan (AIBB) with Yousaf Aziz Magsi, a dissident against the Khanate as well as British government. AIBB infused political sentiment in the region and remained a force of significance to the extent of being often parried by the Khanate during times of successional disputes but it failed to achieve its original objectives of ensuring a representative democracy. Nonetheless, it had sought for the administrative unification of Balochistan and greater autonomy in no uncertain terms. Kurd underwent multiple imprisonments by the British Government alongside other leaders. In June 1935, after Maqsi's death, Kurd became the chief of AIBB.

About two years later, in February 1935, Kurd split to form the Kalat State National Party (KSNP), preferring to advocate for outright independence than bargain with the British for incremental reforms. (Note: The moderate faction split under the leadership of Abdul Samad Khan Achakzai to form the Anjuman-e Watan - they advocated for outright unity with a democratic India. The split also reflected ethnic boundaries with Achakzai representing Pashtun sentiments, and Kurd, Baloch sentiments.) The Khanate, promising to introduce administrative reforms, was accepted as an ally and Kurd was even appointed to the rank of a cabinet minister in Ahmad Yar Khan's court. In his new role, Kurd aided Khan to repress rebellions by the tributary states of Jam and Las Bela. However, Khan declined to facilitate the more radical of reforms centered on democratic principles. Kurd resigned in February 1939. (Note: Axmann remarks that the symbiotic relationship came to an end once Khan realized that the goals of Kurd/KSNP laid not only in an autonomous Balochistan but also in a democratic Balochistan; when the accession to Pakistan would prove inevitable, he strove to preserve his monarchy.) KSNP was banned a few months later, for conspiring against the Khanate and Kurd had to shift bases to Quetta.

Across the 1940s, Kurd remained opposed not only to Jinnah's demand of a united homeland for South Asian Muslims but also merger with India, unlike most of KSNP leaders. (Note: In 1944, KSNP even became a member of the All India States Peoples' Conference, a fraternal unit of the Indian National Congress. Most of its leaders came to view independence as a possibility that would only exist alongside the monarchy of Khanate.)

== Bibliography ==
- Axmann, Martin (2009). Back To The Future: The Khanate of Kalat and the Genesis of Baloch Nationalism - 1915-1955. Oxford University Press. ISBN 9780195476453.
