= Husan Bano Rakhshani =

Pakistani politician

Husan Bano

Member of the Provincial Assembly of Balochistan
- In office 29 May 2013 – 31 May 2018
- Constituency: Reserved seat for women

Personal details
- Party: Jamiat Ulema-e Islam (F)

Husan Bano Rakhshani (Urdu: حسن بانو رخشانی) is a Pakistani politician who was a member of the Provincial Assembly of Balochistan from May 2013 to May 2018.

== Education ==
Rakhshani holds a Master of Arts degree.

== Political career ==
In December 2010, Rakhshani joined the Provincial Cabinet of Balochistan as adviser to Chief Minister for planning and development.

Rakhshani was elected to the Provincial Assembly of Balochistan as a candidate of Jamiat Ulema-e Islam (F) on a reserved seat for women in the 2013 Pakistani general election.
