= Kalat State National Party =

- First Secretary: Malik Saeed Dehwar
- Founded: February 5, 1937 AD
- Dissolved: 1948 AD
- Preceded by: Society for the Unity of Balochis and Balochistan
- Headquarters: Sibi
- Ideology: Nationalist, anti-imperialism, monarchist
- Political position: Far-right, secessionist
- National affiliation: See Baloch diaspora

The Kalat State National Party (KSNP) was a Baloch nationalist political party in Balochistan in the princely state of Kalat from 1937 to 1948. They sought independence from British and full restoration of the Khanate of Kalat.

The party was formed on 5 February 1937 in Sibi, emerging out of the reorganization of the Anjuman-e-Ittehad-e-Balochan. Among its leadership were Aalijah Ghaus Bakhsh Gazgi Mengal, Ghaus Bakhsh Bizenjo, Mir Gul Khan Nasir and Abdul Aziz Kurd. Malik Saeed Dehwar was the party's secretary. The party sought the end of the British occupation of Balochistan and the establishment of an independent sovereign state.
