= Muhammad Khan Achakzai =

Pakistani politician (born 1930)

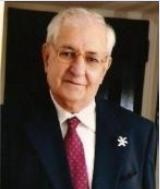
- Muhammad Khan Achakzai in 2011

20th Governor of Balochistan
- In office 11 June 2013 – 6 September 2018
- President: Mamnoon Hussain
- Prime Minister: Nawaz Sharif; Shahid Khaqan Abbasi; Imran Khan
- Preceded by: Zulfikar Ali Magsi
- Succeeded by: Abdul Quddus Bizenjo (Acting); Amanullah Khan Yasinzai

Personal details
- Born: 1 January 1930 (age 96) Qilla Abdullah, Balochistan, British India
- Party: Pashtunkhwa Milli Awami Party
- Relations: Mahmood Khan Achakzai (brother); Hamid Khan Achakzai (brother)
- Parent: Abdul Samad Khan Achakzai (father)

Muhammad Khan Achakzai (Pashto: محمد خان اڅکزی—Muḥammad Xān Aćakzaī; Urdu: محمد خان اچکزئی, born 1 January 1930) is a Pakistani politician who served as the 23rd Governor of Balochistan.

== Early life and education ==
He’s the son of Abdul Samad Achakzai and the elder brother of Mahmood Khan Achakzai and Hamid Khan Achakzai, all politicians.

He earned his Bachelor’s from University of the Punjab, his Master’s in Economics from the University of Strathclyde and his Master’s in Public Administration from the Harvard University.

He is fluent in his native Pashto as well Urdu, English and Persian.

== Academic and professional career ==
Following his studies he became a Lecturer at the Government College, Quetta and then Associate Professor at the University of Balochistan before serving in the Planning Commission, Islamabad till his retirement.

== Political career ==
He was affiliated with the Pakhtunkhwa Milli Awami Party and hails from the prominent Achakzai political family of Balochistan. Achakzai was appointed as Governor of Balochistan on 11 June 2013. He resigned from governorship on 6 September 2018.

== Published works ==
In 2022, he published a translation of his father Abdul Samad Khan Achakzai's autobiography from Urdu, Meri Zindagi aur Zindgani, into English as My Life & Times.
