= Abdul Samad Khan Achakzai =

Pashtun nationalist and political leader (1907–1973)

Abdul Samad Khan Achakzai عبدالصمد اڅکزی
- Born: Abdul Samad; 7 July 1907; Inayat Ullah Karez, Gulistan, Balochistan, British India
- Died: 2 December 1973 (aged 66); Quetta, Pakistan
- Cause of death: Assassination
- Body discovered: Quetta, Pakistan
- Resting place: Inayat Ullah Karez, Gulistan, Pakistan
- Other name: Khan Shaheed
- Citizenship: British India (1907–1947); Pakistan (1947–1973)
- Occupation: Politician
- Known for: Political activism
- Successor: Mahmood Khan Achakzai
- Political party: Pashtunkhwa Milli Awami Party
- Opponent: British Raj
- Children: Muhammad Khan Achakzai; Mahmood Khan Achakzai; Hamid Khan Achakzai
- Parent: Nur Mohammad Khan

Abdul Samad Khan Achakzai (7 July 1907 – 2 December 1973) (Pashto: عبدالصمد خان اڅکزی), commonly known as Khan Shaheed (خان شهيد) (This title or name was given by the great Baba-e-Afghan Abdul Rahim Khan Mandokhail) was a Pashtun nationalist and political leader from the then British Indian province of Baluchistan. He founded the Anjuman-i-Watan Baluchistan, which was allied with the Indian National Congress.

== Early life ==
Achakzai wrote that he was born on 7 July, in the village of Innayatullah Karez. He lost his father early in life. He and his brother, Abdul Salam Khan, were raised by the matriarch Dilbara. Achakzai received his early education at home and was well-versed in the classical Pashto, Arabic, and Persian texts. He joined the local middle school and proved an outstanding student, earning a scholarship.

== Career ==
Abdul Samad Khan Achakzai was imprisoned in May 1930 for the first time. He was previously warned by the rulers for his lectures to the villagers at the mosque.

In his political struggle he founded Anjuman-i-Watan on 30 May 1938 (Khan Shaheed though remained in alliance against British colonial rule in India, but never merged his led Anjuman-i-Watan in the Indian National Congress), which opposed the partition of India.

In 1954, after the creation of Pakistan, he founded "Wror Pashtun" movement, later merged with the Pakistan's largest progressive alliance that became National Awami Party (NAP), as he was believer of the Pashtun unified geographical unit in Pakistan. He parted ways with the latter after merging the Pashtun lands into Balochistan province that violated the NAP manifesto to form national units of Pashtun, Baloch, Sindhi, Siraiki, Bengali and Punjabis.

"He spent the last four years of his life (1969–1973), the longest spell in his political life out of prison, struggling for universal franchise, one-man one-vote in Balochistan and the tribal areas where only members of official Jirga were entitled to vote". Abdul Samad Khan Achakzai believed in equity, was staunch advocate of women rights, and challenged taboos for women voter registration for the general election in 1970.

He was member of the Balochistan Provincial Assembly at the time of his assassination in December 1973. After Samad Khan's demise, his son Engineer Mahmood Khan Achakzai was elected the chairman of the party.

== Literary life ==
Abdul Samad Khan Achakzai reformed the Bayazid Roshan Pashto script by excluding the Arabic alphabets that his fellow Pashtuns could not pronounce, and was the advocate to have a script of Pashto the way it is pronounced.

Abdul Samad Khan Achakzai had command over the Arabic, Persian, English, Urdu, Balochi and Sindhi languages but loved his mother tongue Pashto the most and believed in its core importance in the nationalist struggle. He translated several books to Pashto, including, Tarjuman-ul-Quran of Maulana Abul Kalam Azad, Gulistan-i-Saadi of Sheikh Saadi and Future of Freedom of Dotson Carto, 'Seerat-ul-Nabi of Shabli Numani. Abdul Samad Khan Achakzai succeeded in publishing the first ever newspaper in the province history "Istiqlal" from Quetta in 1938 after his 7 years hard struggle to get the Indian Press Act extended to the region.

== Assassination ==
On the night of 2 December 1973, during the governor's rule imposed by Bhutto in Baluchistan, Achakzai was assassinated in a grenade attack on his home. The identity of his assassins has never been discovered.

== Memoirs ==
Abdul Samad Khan began writing his memoirs in jail, covering the period of his birth in 1907 to serving sentence at district jail, Lahore in 1952. Originally written in Pashto, the memoirs entitled, 'Zama Zhwand aw Zhwandoon' (The Way I Lived) unfurls to the birth of Khan Abdul Samad Khan quickly taking the reader to the patrilineal labyrinth of his ancestry. He introduces his great-grandfather, Inayatullah Khan, son of Bostan Khan and finally Barkhurdar Khan the founding patriarch of his family.

He writes: "Our ancestors since the time of Barkhurdar Khan remained connected to the national Afghan court and government and were apparently educated and well versed in the ways of courts and governance.... It is being related that Burkhurdar Khan was a contemporary of Ahmed Shah Baba (Durrani) the founder of present day Afghanistan." "More than his style of writing, Samad Khan's unreserved thoughts on religion, jargas, drug addiction, pedophilia and other afflictions violating his beloved Pukthun and Pukhtun society force the reader to hasten to the next page".

"In the year 1928 I got married. To get married was a thing to be done so did I. The truth however is that for many years I did not understand the profound and lasting value and meaning of marriage," writes Khan Abdul Samad Khan. "His memoirs are replete with similarly unexpected personal revelations, not ascribed usually to a Pukhtun".

Zama Zhwand aw Zhwandoon' (The way I lived) was transliterated into English by Samad Khan's son, Mohammad Khan Achakzai, who also served as governor of Balochistan from 2013 to 2018. It took Mohammad Khan Achakzai more than seven years to translate his father's opus written in haute Pashto into English. Later, the original Pashto edition was also translated into Ukrainian by high ranking diplomats, Mr Vasili Ivashko and Dr Ghulam Sarwar. Both of the versions, English and Ukrainian, will be out of press by the end of November.
