= University of Balochistan =

University in Balochistan, Pakistan

- جامعہ بلوچستان
- Crest of UoB
- Motto: رَبِّ زدْنيِ عِلْماً
- Motto in English: O' God, Increase my Knowledge
- Type: Public
- Established: 1970; 56 years ago
- Academic affiliations: Higher Education Commission of Pakistan
- Chancellor: Governor of Balochistan
- Vice-Chancellor: Dr. Zahoor Ahmed Bazai
- Academic staff: 400+
- Administrative staff: 900+
- Students: 14,000+
- Location: Quetta-87300, Balochistan, Pakistan; 30.1660°N 66.9900°E
- Campus: Urban 0.81 km2
- Colours: Blue, amber, and white
- Nickname: UoB
- Website: https://www.uob.edu.pk/

The University of Balochistan (UoB) (Urdu: جامعہ بلوچستان; Balochi: دانشگاه بلوچستان; Pashto: د بلوچستان پوهنتون; Dari: دانشگاه بلوچستان) also known as Balochistan University, is a public university located in the city center area of Quetta, Balochistan, Pakistan. UoB is the oldest highest education institution in Balochistan, having been established in 1970.

== Overview ==
The University of Balochistan (UoB) was established in October 1970 through an Ordinance issued by the Governor of Balochistan. In 1996, the Balochistan Assembly passed the University of Balochistan ACT . In 2022, a unified ACT for all public sector universities in the province was passed, under which UoB currently operates.

UoB is the largest general university in Balochistan, offering higher education across Science, Arts, and Humanities. The university now consists of 6 faculties, 56 departments, 5 centers, and 1 constituent law college. Initially starting with three departments—Physics, Chemistry, and Geology—it has since expanded significantly.

The following institutes and specialized centers are now part of the university:

== Institutes ==
1. Institute of Management Sciences
2. Institute of Biochemistry
3. Institute of Education & Research
4. Institute of Languages & Literature

== Specialized centers ==
1. Center of Excellence in Mineralogy
2. Pakistan Study Center
3. Area Study Center
4. Balochistan Study Center
5. China Study Centre
6. Center for Advanced Studies in Vaccinology and Biotechnology (CASVAB)

The university also operates a constituent Law College and sub-campuses in Quetta (Jungle Bagh and City), Mastung, Kharan, Pishin, and Killa-Saifullah. Additionally, several affiliated colleges contribute to the university's academic network. The Abdul Samad Khan Shaheed Chair and Nawab Yousaf Aziz Magsi Chair have also been established at UoB. Academic Programs:

UoB offers a variety of programs including a four-year BS, as well as M.S / M.Phil., and Ph.D. programs. Since 2017, the university has adopted a semester system. The current enrollment exceeds 14,000 students.

== Admission criteria and seat allocation ==
Admissions in teaching departments are granted based on merit and seat allocation as follows:

- Open Merit: 10% of seats.
- Quetta District Residents: 15% of seats.
- Other Districts of Balochistan: 75% of seats.
- Additional seats are reserved for specialized disciplines.

Special Provisions

- If no applicant or only one applicant qualifies from a specific district, up to two additional candidates from that district may be granted admission on merit from the pool of unsuccessful but otherwise eligible candidates who have already applied.
- For the Pharmacy program, two additional candidates from each district may be granted admission based on merit from eligible applicants who had submitted their applications earlier.

=== Admission categories ===
1. Category A: Local/domiciled residents of Balochistan who meet the academic prerequisites and eligibility criteria.

2. Category B: Direct dependents (son/daughter, brother/sister, wife/husband) of Federal Government and Autonomous Organization personnel serving in Balochistan who meet the required academic criteria.

3. Category C:

- Nominees from AJK, Armed Forces, FATA, and Federal Schools.
- Reserved seats for disabled and foreign students.
- Direct dependents of university teachers, staff, employees, and Pakistanis working abroad.

=== Quota policy ===
- Open Merit: 10%
- Residents of Quetta City: 15%
- Rest of Balochistan: 75%

=== Eligibility criteria ===
- Applicants must be local/domiciled residents of Balochistan who meet the academic prerequisites.
- Direct dependents of personnel serving in Balochistan and nominees from AJK, Armed Forces, FATA, and Federal Schools are also eligible.
- Direct dependents of university employees and Pakistanis working abroad are also eligible.

=== Academic qualifications ===
- Applicants must have passed the qualifying examination within the last two years. For admissions in 2004, the qualifying examination must have been passed in 2002 or later.
- In programs with available seats, applicants who graduated one year earlier (2001) may be eligible.
- For language courses (Balochi, Brahvi, Persian, Pushto, Urdu) and Philosophy, applicants who graduated up to four years prior (2000) may be considered, subject to seat availability. These applicants are not entitled to hostel accommodation or interdepartmental migration.

=== Ineligibility criteria ===
- Non-local/non-domiciled applicants, except those specified under the eligibility categories.
- Applicants who do not meet the academic prerequisites.
- Applicants who passed the qualifying examination earlier than three years before the admission year (2000 or earlier).
- Applicants who hold a postgraduate degree.
- Applicants already enrolled or previously enrolled at the university.

== Authorities of the university ==
The following are the authorities of the university:

1. The Senate
2. The Syndicate
3. The Academic Council
4. The Board of Faculties
5. The Board of Studies
6. The Selection Board
7. The Advanced Studies and Research Board
8. The Finance and Planning Committee
9. The Affiliation Committee
10. The Discipline Committee

== Faculties and departments ==
The university started with three departments, Physics, Chemistry and Geology in 1971 but now it has 46 departments. The university has four institutes and five centers. A Fine Arts Department was established in March 1984 with four faculty members, Jamal Shah, Faryal Gohar, Akram Dost and Kaleem Khan. Initially the department offered a certificate course. It deals with painting, drawing, sculpture, and graphic art as well as historical theories of human development through the ages. The department plays very important role in introducing Balochistan's heritage and its indigenous art, crafts and architecture. Since the civilization of Mehrgarh (9000 BCE) is a great source of inspiration for researchers and provides linkage with the other world of art and craft, the Department of Fine Arts also provides a facility to study in depth the cultural heritage of Balochistan.

The university has also established a computer science department to promote IT.

List of faculties and departments/programs:

1. Faculty of Physical and Environmental Science

- Chemistry Department
- Mathematics Department
- Physics Department
- Statistics Department
- Computer Science Department
- Geology Department
- Renewable Energy Department
- Department of Geophysics
- Centre of Excellence in Mineralogy
- Environmental Sciences

2. Faculty of Arts and Humanities

- Archaeology
- Institute of Education And Research
- Fine Arts Department
- History Department
- Media Studies Department
- Philosophy Department
- Psychology Department
- Department of Islamic Studies

3. Faculty of Biological, Pharmaceutical And Health Sciences

- Botany Department
- CASVAB
- Institute of Bio-Chemistry
- Department of Microbiology
- Zoology Department
- Botanical Garden
- Department of Eastern Medicine
- Department of Pharmaceutical Chemistry
- Department of Pharmaceutics
- Department of Pharmacognosy
- Department of Pharmacology
- Department of Pharmacy Practice
- Department of Physical Therapy
- Department of Pharmacy

4. Faculty of Literature & Languages

- Balochi Department
- Brahui Department
- Pashto Department
- Persian Department
- Urdu Department
- China Study Centre
- Balochistan Study Center
- English Literature Department
- Department of Linguistics and Philology

5. Faculty of Management and Information Sciences

- Commerce Department
- Economics Department
- Institute of Management Sciences (MBA/MPA)
- Department of Library & Information Science

6. Faculty of Social Sciences

- Anthropology
- Area Study Center
- Disaster Management & Development studies
- International Relations Department
- University Law College
- Political Science Department
- Social Work Department
- Sociology Department
- Gender & Development Studies
- Pakistan Study Center
- Department of Geography and Regional Planning

== Main library ==
Library automation

The Directorate of Information Technology (D.I.T.) at Balochistan University has developed software for Library Automation in collaboration with library professionals. To date, 50,000 books have been processed.

Services

- Library Orientation: For new members.
- Reader's Advisory: Assistance in finding and using library resources.
- Reference Services: Support for research and information queries.
- Periodical Content Services: Access to various periodicals.
- Bibliographic Services: Help with citations and bibliographic information.

Digital Library

Established in 2006 within the Central Library, the Digital Library serves both faculty members and students. It provides access to 23,000 full-text journals of international repute and 40,000 e-books through the E-brary program, funded by the Higher Education Commission.

Future prospects

- Language Computer Lab: Establishment of a dedicated lab.
- Central Library Seating Expansion: Increase in seating capacity.
- Digital Library Seating Expansion: Additional seating in the Digital Library.

== UoB journals ==
- Al-Burz
- Balochistan Review
- Takatoo
- The Journal of Geography and Social Sciences
- Journal of Education & Humanities Research (JEHR)
- Hanken, Research Journal of Balochi department
- Research Journal, Research Journal of Pakistan Study Centre (PSC)
- Middle East Review Journal of Area Study Centre (ASC)

== Affiliated colleges ==
The university has a constituent law college and 88 affiliated colleges including Balochistan Agriculture College.

== Notable alumni and faculty ==
- Zubaida Jalal Khan (Minister of Defense Production)
- Sadiq Sanjrani (Chairman of the Senate of Pakistan)
- Syedaal Khan Nasar (Deputy Chairman of the Senate of Pakistan)
- Abdul Quddus Bizenjo (Chief Minister of Balochistan)
- Jamal Shah
- Samson Simon Sharaf
- Hayatullah Khan Durrani
- Orya Maqbool Jan
- Rustam Jamali
- Tahira Safdar (Chief Justice of Balochistan High Court)
- Safdar Kiyani
- Alauddin Marri
- Rahila Durrani
- Gulzar Dost
- Ayub Khoso
- Seumas Kerr CBE (Major General in the British Army)

== See also ==
- Balochistan Agriculture College
- List of universities in Pakistan
