= National Party (Pakistan) =

Pakistani political party

National Party نيشنل پارٹی
- Abbreviation: NP
- Leader: Abdul Malik Baloch
- Secretary-General: Mir Kabeer Ahmed Muhammad Shahi
- Founders: Abdul Hai Baloch; Abdul Malik Baloch; Hasil Bizenjo
- Founded: 2003; 23 years ago
- Merger of: Balochistan National Democratic Party (BNDP); Balochistan National Movement (Hayee) (BNM-H)
- Headquarters: Quetta, Balochistan, Pakistan
- Student wing: Baloch Students Organization (Pajjar)
- Ideology: Secularism; Social democracy Baloch nationalism Civic nationalism
- Political position: Centre-left
- National affiliation: PDM
- International affiliation: Progressive Alliance
- Senate: 1 / 96
- National Assembly: 1 / 336
- Balochistan Assembly: 4 / 65

Election symbol
- Saw

Party flag
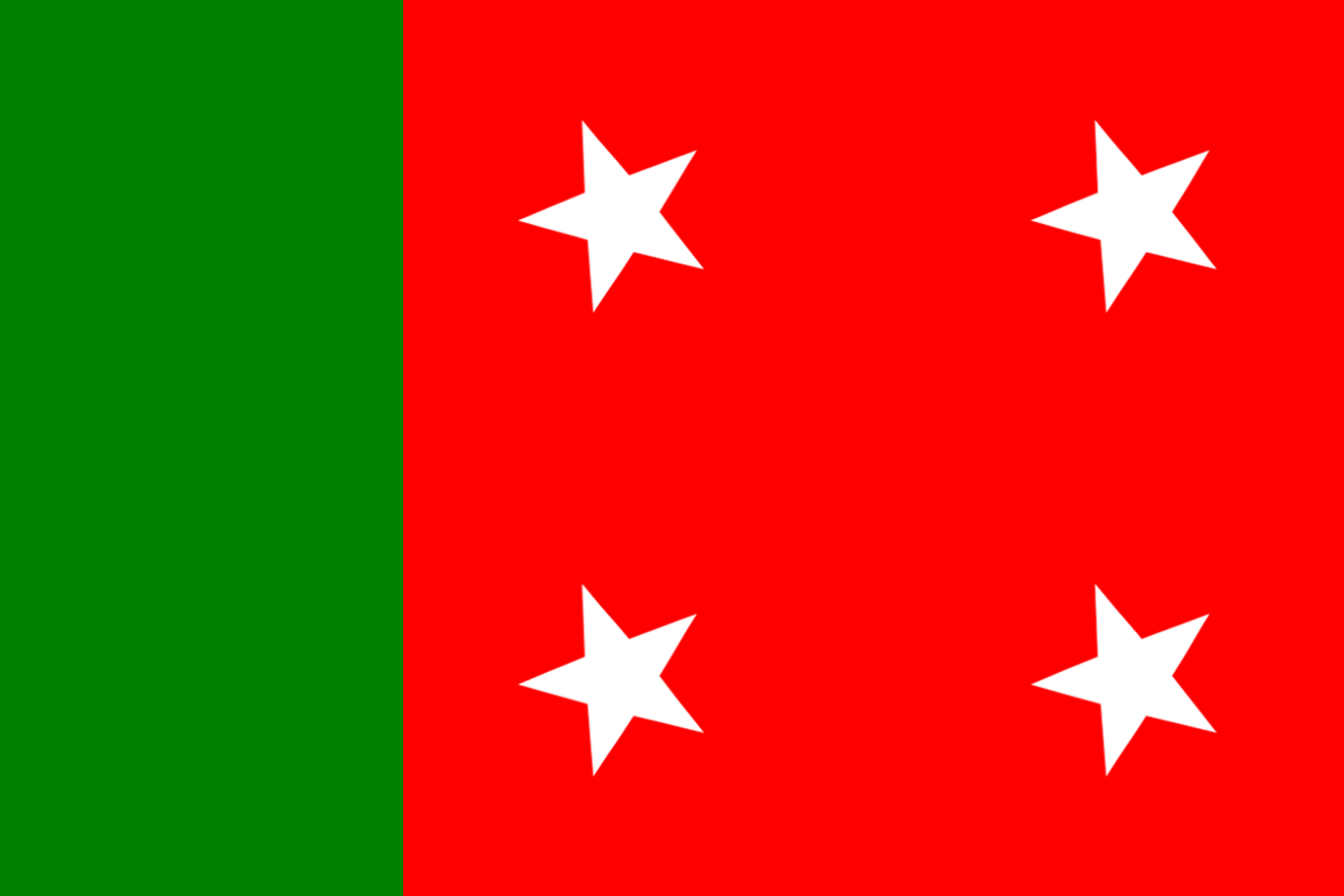

The National Party (abbr. NP) (Note: Urdu: نيشنل پارٹی) is a Pakistani political party, based in Balochistan, with a leftist political position and a social democratic ideology. It is one of the largest regionalist parties active in the province, along with the Balochistan National Party. It traces its legacy from the Kalat State National Party of Mir Ghaus Bakhsh Bizenjo, Mir Gul Khan Nasir and Mir Abdul Aziz Kurd, and is currently headed by Abdul Malik Baloch.

== Founding ==
N.P was established in October 2003 when the non-tribal, essentially middle-class Balochistan National Democratic Party (BNDP) led by Hasil Bizenjo, son of the Baloch nationalist Ghaus Bakhsh Bizenjo, merged with the non-tribal middle-class nationalist party Balochistan National Movement (BNM) led by Dr. Abdul Hai Baloch. It is considered to be the successor of the Kalat National Party. Abdul Hai Baloch became the first chairman of the National Party and Hasil Bizenjo became the secretary general of the new party. In 2008, Abdul Malik Baloch was elected as the party president, and was the Chief Minister of Balochistan between 2013 and 2015.

== Electoral history ==
=== Election boycott ===
The party boycotted the 2008 general elections as a protest against the military operation being conducted in the province at the time. However, Sanaullah Zehri and his followers decided to contest elections forming a faction called NP Parliamentarians. As a result, National Party won one provincial assembly seat with Sanuallah Zehri winning PB-33 Khuzdar-I.

=== Election 2013 ===
The party participated in General elections of 2013 and secured victory on 11 seats of Balochistan Provincial Assembly and 1 seat of National Assembly. The government was formed in coalition with PKMAP and PML(N), with the party's MPA and then president Dr Abdul Malik Baloch heading the government as Chief Minister Balochistan. Now Hasil Bezenjo is the president after 4th National Congress held in Quetta in November 2015.

=== Congress 2014 ===
The fourth congress of National Party was conducted on 8–10 November 2014. The elections were conducted by Abdullah Dayo, who was assigned as the Chief Election Commissioner of the party. Mir Hasil Khan Bizenjo was elected party president, Dr. Yasin Baloch as Secretary General and Dr. Hassan Nasir as Deputy Secretary General. The congress also determined the program to organize party all across Pakistan. The party's constitution was also revised. Syed Mukhtar Bacha was elected as Khyber Pakhtunkhwa's Organizer, Ayub Malik as Punjab's Organizer and Ramzan Memon as Sindh's Organizer.
