= Second Shehbaz Sharif government =

Incumbent federal cabinet of Pakistan since 2024

Federal Cabinet of Shehbaz Sharif
- 51st Cabinet of Pakistan
- 2024-Present
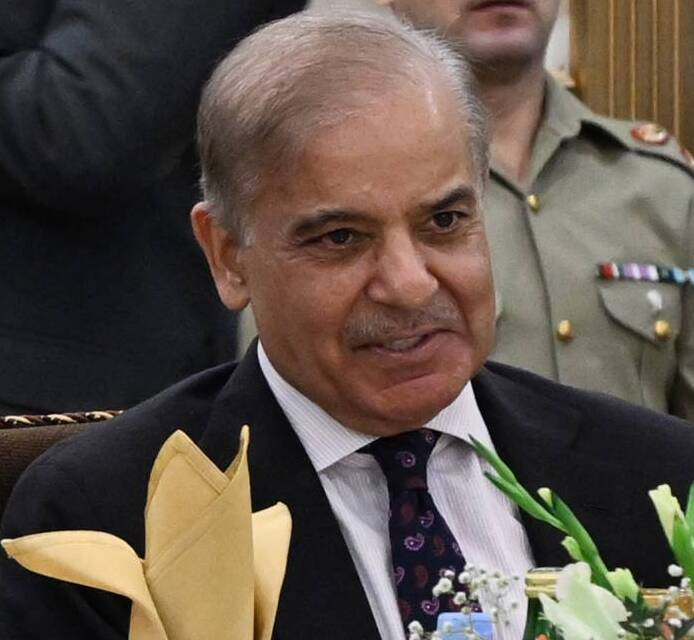
- Date formed: 11 March 2024

People and organisations
- President: Asif Ali Zardari
- Prime Minister: Shehbaz Sharif
- Deputy Prime Minister: Ishaq Dar
- No. of ministers: 57
- Member party: PMLN; PPP; MQM-P; PML(Q); IPP; BAP; PTI-P; NP; PML(Z); PSP; IND; JWP; JUP-N; ITP; BPP; PART
- Status in legislature: Coalition government
- Opposition party: PTI; MWM; PKMAP; JIP; ANP; AP; MQM-L; TLP; MQM-H; PRHP; JUI (F); NDM; QWP; ST; STP; SUP; BNP(A); SIC; BNP(M); PKNAP; HDP; GDA; HDTB; PRM; AWP; PMML
- Opposition leader: Mahmood Khan Achakzai

History
- Elections: 2024 General Elections; 2024 Senate Elections
- Legislature terms: 16th Parliament of Pakistan
- Budgets: 7th NFC Award; 2024–25 and 2025–26
- Predecessor: Kakar caretaker government

The Second Shehbaz Sharif government is the incumbent federal cabinet and Government led by Shehbaz Sharif after he was sworn into office on 11 March 2024 following the 2024 Pakistani general election.

== Cabinet formation ==
On 6 March, the Cabinet Division issued the de-notification of the caretaker cabinet. The next day PML-N leader Attaullah Tarar said that the federal cabinet would be finalized within the next 48 hours. Adding that HBL President Muhammad Aurangzeb would be considered for the financial portfolio, remarking “The most important portfolio is the finance ministry as the economy has to be revived and the matters with the IMF will have to be taken forward." Shehbaz Sharif would host a dinner together with leaders of the Pakistan Peoples Party (PPP), the Pakistan Muslim League-Quaid (PML-Q), the Istehkam-e-Pakistan Party (IPP) and the Muttahida Qaumi Movement-Pakistan (MQM-P) over Federal Cabinet finalization. PML-N would request for the PPP to join the cabinet, however Bilawal Bhutto would announce that it would support PML-N in government formation without joining cabinet, addressing PPP's CEC meeting “The PPP has decided that while we are not in a position to join the federal government ourselves, nor will we be interested in taking ministries in such a set-up, we also do not want to see political chaos in the country. We do not want to see perpetual crisis in the country,” he said. On March 9 Nawaz Sharif directed Shehbaz Sharif to implement the parties manifesto after the formation of the federal cabinet. Later Nawaz would direct the PM to keep the federal cabinet small in the initial phase. During the meeting, Shehbaz Sharif would table the proposed names of the Federal Cabinet to the PML-N leader. Four-time finance minister and Sharif family associate Ishaq Dar would drop out the race for the position of Minister of Finance & Revenue. According to the Tribune, an anonymous PML-N leader claimed that the appointment of Mohsin Naqvi as Interior Minister would "erode the government's credibility", according to another anonymous PML-N leader, Ishaq Dar was not chosen due to the PM's preference for a new Finance minister.

Prior to the inauguration of the Federal Cabinet, the International Monetary Fund (IMF) reportedly tied cabinet formation as a pre-condition for the sending of an IMF team to Pakistan to negotiate and finalize another bailout from the Fund.

On 11 March, President Asif Ali Zardari administered the oath to the PM's 19-member federal cabinet. The proposals for appointment was made under clause 1 of Article 92 (federal ministers and ministers of state) of the Constitution. On the same day Muhammad Aurangzeb, the new finance minister would renounce his Dutch nationality and be granted Pakistani nationality as well as resign from his position as CEO of Habib Bank Limited. The nineteen member cabinet includes many veteran politicians and newcomers. Mohsin Naqvi and Ahad Cheema, former caretaker ministers would be included amongst other PML-N stalwarts. The swearing-in ceremony was held in the President's House (Aiwan-i-Sadr). On March 12 the new Federal cabinet members assumed charge after allocation of their portfolios. The new cabinet was criticized for sidelining some members of the elected coalition, seen in the absence of Ishaq Dar in the financial portfolio and Rana Sanaullah as interior minister, traditional supporters of Nawaz Sharif. Shehbaz Sharif's position as Prime Minister has also been seen as to maintain strong relations with the military and ensuring its influence in administration. The military's backing of the new cabinet composition has also been seen as a way to send a message against the political opposition that attempts to undermine the new government will be met with force and push through reforms, such as through the SIFC.

== Composition of cabinet ==
=== Federal ministers ===
Federal ministers
| | Name | Portfolio | Party | Citation |
|---|---|---|---|---|
| 1 | Shehbaz Sharif | Prime Minister of Pakistan Other Portfolios: 1. All Portfolios/Ministries not held by other ministers in cabinet 2. Cabinet Secretariat; Aviation Division; Cabinet Division; Establishment Division; National Security Council; Poverty Alleviation and Social Safety Division; 3. Exit Control List (ECL) Cabinet Body | PMLN | |
| 2 | Ishaq Dar | DPM/Foreign Affairs | PMLN | |
| 3 | Khawaja Asif | Defense | PMLN | |
| 4 | Ahsan Iqbal | Planning Development | PMLN | |
| 5 | Rana Tanveer Hussain | Food Security | PMLN | |
| 6 | Azam Nazeer Tarar | Justice | PMLN | |
| 7 | Awn Chawdhary | Overseas Pakistanis | IPP | |
| 8 | Aleem Khan | Communications | IPP | |
| 9 | Jam Kamal Khan | Commerce | PMLN | |
| 10 | Amir Muqam | Kashmir and Gilgit-Baltistan | PMLN | |
| 11 | Awais Leghari | Energy | PMLN | |
| 12 | Attaullah Tarar | Information and Broadcasting | PMLN | |
| 13 | Khalid Maqbool Siddiqui | Education | MQM-P | |
| 14 | Qaiser Ahmed Sheikh | Board of Investment | PMLN | |
| 15 | Riaz Hussain Pirzada | Housings | PMLN | |
| 16 | Musadik Malik | Climate Change and Envinronment | PMLN | |
| 17 | Muhammad Aurangzeb | Finance | PMLN | |
| 18 | Ahad Cheema | Economics | PMLN | |
| 19 | Mohsin Naqvi | Interior and Narcotics Control | IND | |
| 20 | Tariq Fazal Chaudhry | Parliamentary Affairs | PMLN | |
| 21 | Ali Pervaiz Malik | Petroleum Division | PMLN | |
| 22 | Aurangzeb Khan Khichi | National Heritage and Culture | PMLN | |
| 23 | Hanif Abbasi | Railways | PMLN | |
| 24 | Khalid Hussain Magsi | Science and Technology | BAP | |
| 25 | Muhammad Moeen Wattoo | Water Resources | PMLN | |
| 26 | Muhammad Junaid Anwar | Maritime Affairs | PMLN | |
| 27 | Raza Hayat Hiraj | Defense Production | PMLN | |
| 28 | Sardar Muhammad Yousuf | Religious Affairs | PMLN | |
| 29 | Shaza Fatima Khawaja | Information Technology | PMLN | |
| 30 | Rana Mubashir Iqbal | Ministry of Public Affairs Unit | PMLN | |
| 31 | Syed Mustafa Kamal | Health | MQM-P | |
| 32 | Syed Imran Ahmed Shah | Poverty Alleviation and Social Safety | PMLN | |

=== Ministers Of State ===
Minister of State
| # | Name | Portfolio | Party | Citation |
|---|---|---|---|---|
| 1 | Awn Chawdhary | Minister of State for Overseas Pakistanis & Human Resources Development | IPP | |
| 2 | Abdul Rehman Kanju | Minister of State for Power and Public Affairs Unit | PMLN | |
| 3 | Aqeel Malik | Minister of State for Law and Justice | PMLN | |
| 4 | Bilal Azhar Kayani | Minister of State for Finance and Revenue, Railway and head of Prime Minister’s Delivery Unit | PMLN | |
| 5 | Kheal Das Kohistani | Minister of State for Religious Affairs and Interfaith Harmony | PMLN | |
| 6 | Mukhtar Ahmad Bharath | Minister of State for National Health Services, Regulations & Coordination | PMLN | |
| 7 | Talal Chaudhry | Minister of State for Interior and Narcotics Control | PMLN | |
| 8 | Wajiha Qamar | Minister of State for Federal Education and Professional Training | IPP | |
| 9 | Malik Rasheed Ahmed Khan | Minister of State for National Food Security and Research | PMLN | |
| 10 | Armaghan Subhani | Minister of State for Planning, Development & Special Initiatives | PMLN | |
| 11 | Shezra Mansab Ali Khan | Minister of State for Climate Change and Environmental Coordination | PMLN | |

=== Adviser to the prime minister ===
Adviser to the prime minister
| # | Name | Portfolio | Party | Citation |
|---|---|---|---|---|
| 1 | Rana Sanaullah | Political and Public Affairs Inter-Provincial Coordination | PMLN | |
| 2 | Syed Tauqeer Hussain Shah | Prime Minister's Office | PMLN | |
| 3 | Muhammad Ali | Privatization | Independent | |
| 4 | Pervez Khattak | Interior Affairs | PTI-P | |
| 5 | Haroon Akhtar Khan | Industries and Production | PMLN | |

=== Special assistant to the prime minister ===
Special assistant to the prime minister
| # | Name | Portfolio | Status | Party | Citation |
|---|---|---|---|---|---|
| 1 | Tariq Fatemi | Foreign Affairs | Minister of State | PMLN | |
| 2 | Bilal Bin Saqib | Blockchain and Crypto | Minister of State | PMLN | |
| 3 | Muhammad Sadiq | Special Representative of Pakistan on Afghanistan | Minister of State | PMLN | |
| 4 | Tariq Bajwa | Coordination of the Deputy Prime Minister Office (Note: In addition to Foreign Affairs office, headed by same minister) | Minister of State | PMLN | |
| 5 | Fahd Haroon | Digital Media | Minister of State | PMLN | |
| 6 | Huzaifa Rehman | National Heritage & Culture | Minister of State | PMLN | |
| 7 | Mubarak Zeb | Tribal Affairs | Minister of State | ANP | |
| 8 | Talha Burki | Political Affairs | Minister of State | PMLN | |
| 9 | Zafar Iqbal | Energy | Minister of State | | |

=== Coordinator to the prime minister ===
Coordinator to the prime minister
| # | Name | Portfolio | Party | Citation |
|---|---|---|---|---|
| 1 | Babar Nawaz Khan | Kashmir Affairs & Gilgit Baltistan | PMLN | |
| 2 | Bilal Farooq Tarar | Media Coordinator | PMLN | |
| 3 | Romina Khurshid Alam | Climate Change & Environmental Coordination | PMLN | |
| 4 | Rana Ihsaan Afzal Khan | General Issues | PMLN | |
| 5 | Ikhtiar Wali Khan | Information for Khyber Pakhtunkhwa Affairs | PMLN | |

=== Cabinet division and cabinet secretariat ===
The current Federal Secretary of the Cabinet is Kamran Ali Afzal, since his appointment in August 2023. On 20 March the National Seed Development and Regulatory Authority (NSDRA) and Cannabis Control and Regulatory Authority were both placed under the administrative control of the Cabinet Division. The Cabinet Secretariat is directly under the Prime Minister and Cabinet Secretary, controlling the Aviation Division, Cabinet Division, Establishment Division, National Security Division and Poverty Alleviation & Social Safety Division.

=== Cabinet committees ===
On 21 March the cabinet division would issue two separate notifications constituting the Economic Coordination Committee (ECC) and the Cabinet Committee on Energy (CCoE), by the Prime Minister under terms of rule 17(2) of Rules of Business, 1973. Both would be retained directly under Shehbaz Sharif, becoming Chairman of both committees. On the same day Shehbaz would also approve the reconstitution of the Cabinet Committee on Privatization (CCoP), with MoFA Ishaq Dar as Chairman with the secretarial support of the Committee provided by the Aviation Division; and the reconstitution of the Cabinet Committee on State-Owned Enterprises (CCoSOEs), with Minister of Finance and Revenue, Muhammad Aurangzeb as Chairman. Additional Committees constituted on 21 March include the Cabinet Committee on Disposal of Legislative Cases (CCLC) under Azam Nazeer Tarar, the Cabinet Committee on Chinese Investment Projects (CCoCIP) under Ahsan Iqbal, and a committee to "speed up" the privatization of Pakistan International Airways (PIA) under Khawaja Asif. With forty-eight hours, on 23 March the Cabinet Division issued a notification, appointing Muhammad Aurangzeb as new Chairman of the ECC, with Shehbaz Sharif withdrawing from the committee Previously Aurangzeb held chairmanship of only the Cabinet Committee on SOEs (CCoSOEs), while Ishaq Dar also held a prominent role in the new cabinet committees as chairman of Cabinet Committee on Privatisation (CCoP). This was a departure from past practices, where finance ministers chaired three out of four committees. With Shahbaz Rana writing that the "PM had "clipped" the Finance Minister’s "decision-making wings" by depriving him of the ECC. The decision to place Aurangzeb as chairman also came after criticism from "all quarters." Pakistan newspaper Dawn, quoting a senior member of the cabinet officially stated that the PM had “regretted he would be unable to chair the ECC meetings due to his hectic schedule and engagements.” On 28 March the Cabinet Committee on Inter-Governmental Commercial Transactions (CCoIGCT) would be constituted, chaired by Khawaja Asif, with Terms of Reference (ToR) that the committee may authorize, recommend approval, and constitute a negotiation committee for a G2G or commercial agreement with a foreign state, as well as approve price-discovery mechanisms, submit recommendations for existing regulatory compliance. Operating under the clauses (c) and (d) of sub-section (2) of Section (4) of the Inter-Governmental Commercial Transactions Act, 2022.

Economic Coordination Committee (ECC) of the Cabinet
| Minister | Referenced Office | Status | By Special Invitation/Co-Opted | Citation |
|---|---|---|---|---|
| Muhammad Aurangzeb | Finance | Chairman | ● Deputy Chairman of the Planning Commission ● Governor of State Bank of Pakistan ● Chairman of the Securities Exchange Commission ● Fourteen (14) Federal Secretaries (Note: These are the: (1) Secretary of the Power Division; (2) Secretary of the Commerce Division; (3) Secretary of the Communications Division; (4) Secretary of the Finance Division; (5) Secretary of the Industries & Production Division; (6) Secretary of the Economic Affairs Division; (7) Secretary of the Petroleum Division; (8) Secretary for Planning, Development & Special Initiatives Division; (9) Secretary of the National Food Security & Research Division; (10) Secretary of the Privatization Division; (11) Secretary of the Railways Division; (12) Secretary of the Revenue Division/Chairman of the FBR; (13) Secretary of the Poverty Alleviation & Social Safety Division; (14) and the Secretary of the Water Resources Division) ● Chairman of the Board of Investment | |
| Ahad Cheema | Economic Affairs | Committee Member | ● Deputy Chairman of the Planning Commission ● Governor of State Bank of Pakistan ● Chairman of the Securities Exchange Commission ● Fourteen (14) Federal Secretaries ● Chairman of the Board of Investment | |
| Jam Kamal Khan | Commerce | Committee Member | ● Deputy Chairman of the Planning Commission ● Governor of State Bank of Pakistan ● Chairman of the Securities Exchange Commission ● Fourteen (14) Federal Secretaries ● Chairman of the Board of Investment | |
| Awais Leghari | Energy | Committee Member | ● Deputy Chairman of the Planning Commission ● Governor of State Bank of Pakistan ● Chairman of the Securities Exchange Commission ● Fourteen (14) Federal Secretaries ● Chairman of the Board of Investment | |
| Musadik Malik | Petroleum | Committee Member | ● Deputy Chairman of the Planning Commission ● Governor of State Bank of Pakistan ● Chairman of the Securities Exchange Commission ● Fourteen (14) Federal Secretaries ● Chairman of the Board of Investment | |
| Ahsan Iqbal | Planning | Committee Member | ● Deputy Chairman of the Planning Commission ● Governor of State Bank of Pakistan ● Chairman of the Securities Exchange Commission ● Fourteen (14) Federal Secretaries ● Chairman of the Board of Investment | |

Cabinet Committee on Energy (CCoE)
| Minister | Referenced Office | Status | By Special Invitation/Co-Opted | Citation |
|---|---|---|---|---|
| Shehbaz Sharif | Prime Minister | Chairman | ● Chairman of OGRA ● Chairman of NEPRA ● Secretary of the Finance Division ● Secretary of the Power Division ● Secretary of the Petroleum Division ● Secretary of the Law & Justice Division | |
| Ahad Cheema | Economic Affairs | Committee Member | ● Chairman of OGRA ● Chairman of NEPRA ● Secretary of the Finance Division ● Secretary of the Power Division ● Secretary of the Petroleum Division ● Secretary of the Law & Justice Division | |
| Muhammad Aurangzeb | Finance | Committee Member | ● Chairman of OGRA ● Chairman of NEPRA ● Secretary of the Finance Division ● Secretary of the Power Division ● Secretary of the Petroleum Division ● Secretary of the Law & Justice Division | |
| Musadik Malik | Petroleum | Committee Member | ● Chairman of OGRA ● Chairman of NEPRA ● Secretary of the Finance Division ● Secretary of the Power Division ● Secretary of the Petroleum Division ● Secretary of the Law & Justice Division | |
| Ahsan Iqbal | Planning | Committee Member | ● Chairman of OGRA ● Chairman of NEPRA ● Secretary of the Finance Division ● Secretary of the Power Division ● Secretary of the Petroleum Division ● Secretary of the Law & Justice Division | |
| Awais Leghari | Energy | Committee Member | ● Chairman of OGRA ● Chairman of NEPRA ● Secretary of the Finance Division ● Secretary of the Power Division ● Secretary of the Petroleum Division ● Secretary of the Law & Justice Division | |

Cabinet Committee on Privatization (CCoP)
| Minister | Referenced Office | Status | By Special Invitation/Co-Opted | Citation |
|---|---|---|---|---|
| Ishaq Dar | Foreign Affairs | Chairman | ● Governor of State Bank of Pakistan ● Chairman of the Securities Exchange Commission ● Ten (10) Federal Secretaries (Note: Consists of the following: (1) Secretary of the Power Division; (2) Secretary of the Commerce Division; (3) Secretary of the Communications Division; (4) Secretary of the Finance Division; (5) Secretary of the Industries & Production Division; (6) Secretary of the Law and Justice Division; (7) Secretary of the Petroleum Division; (8) Secretary of the Planning, Development & Special Initiatives Division; (9) Secretary of the Privatisation Division; (10) Secretary of the Revenue Division) | |
| Muhammad Aurangzeb | Finance | Committee Member | ● Governor of State Bank of Pakistan ● Chairman of the Securities Exchange Commission ● Ten (10) Federal Secretaries | |
| Jam Kamal Khan | Commerce | Committee Member | ● Governor of State Bank of Pakistan ● Chairman of the Securities Exchange Commission ● Ten (10) Federal Secretaries | |
| Awais Leghari | Energy | Committee Member | ● Governor of State Bank of Pakistan ● Chairman of the Securities Exchange Commission ● Ten (10) Federal Secretaries | |
| Rana Tanveer Hussain | Industries & Production | Committee Member | ● Governor of State Bank of Pakistan ● Chairman of the Securities Exchange Commission ● Ten (10) Federal Secretaries | |
| Aleem Khan | Privatisation | Committee Member | ● Governor of State Bank of Pakistan ● Chairman of the Securities Exchange Commission ● Ten (10) Federal Secretaries | |

Cabinet Committee for Disposal of Legislative Cases (CCLC)
| Minister | Referenced Office | Status | By Special Invitation/Co-Opted | Citation |
|---|---|---|---|---|
| Azam Nazeer Tarar | Law & Justice | Chairman | ● Attorney General for Pakistan ● Cabinet Secretary ● Secretary of the Law & Justice Division ● Additional Secretary of the Prime Minister’s Office | |
| Attaullah Tarar | Information & Broadcasting | Committee Member | ● Attorney General for Pakistan ● Cabinet Secretary ● Secretary of the Law & Justice Division ● Additional Secretary of the Prime Minister’s Office | |
| Chaudhry Salik Hussain | Overseas Pakistanis & HR Development | Committee Member | ● Attorney General for Pakistan ● Cabinet Secretary ● Secretary of the Law & Justice Division ● Additional Secretary of the Prime Minister’s Office | |
| Jam Kamal Khan | Commerce | Committee Member | ● Attorney General for Pakistan ● Cabinet Secretary ● Secretary of the Law & Justice Division ● Additional Secretary of the Prime Minister’s Office | |
| Aleem Khan | Economic Affairs | Committee Member | ● Attorney General for Pakistan ● Cabinet Secretary ● Secretary of the Law & Justice Division ● Additional Secretary of the Prime Minister’s Office | |
| Rana Tanveer Hussain | Industries & Production | Committee Member | ● Attorney General for Pakistan ● Cabinet Secretary ● Secretary of the Law & Justice Division ● Additional Secretary of the Prime Minister’s Office | |

Cabinet Committee on Chinese Investment Projects (CCoCIP)
| Minister | Referenced Office | Status | By Special Invitation/Co-Opted | Citation |
|---|---|---|---|---|
| Ahsan Iqbal | Planning | Chairman | ● Governor of State Bank of Pakistan ● Sixteen (16) Federal Secretaries (Note: These consist of: (1) Secretary of the Foreign Affairs Division; (2) Secretary of the Interior Division; (3) Secretary of the Economic Affairs Division; (4) Secretary of the Power Division; (5) Secretary of the Commerce Division; (6) Secretary of the National Food Security & Research Division; (7) Secretary of the Communications Division; (8) Secretary of the Finance Division; (9) Secretary of the Industries & Production Division; (10) Secretary of the Railways Division; (11) Secretary of the Aviation Division; (12) Secretary of the Petroleum Division; (13) Secretary of the Planning, Development & Special Initiatives Division; (14) Secretary of the Maritime Affairs Division; (15) Secretary of the Board of Investment; and the (16) Secretary of the Revenue Division/Chairman of the FBR) | |
| Ishaq Dar | Foreign Affairs | Committee Member | ● Governor of State Bank of Pakistan ● Sixteen (16) Federal Secretaries | |
| Mohsin Naqvi | Interior | Committee Member | ● Governor of State Bank of Pakistan ● Sixteen (16) Federal Secretaries | |
| Muhammad Aurangzeb | Finance | Committee Member | ● Governor of State Bank of Pakistan ● Sixteen (16) Federal Secretaries | |
| Jam Kamal Khan | Commerce | Committee Member | ● Governor of State Bank of Pakistan ● Sixteen (16) Federal Secretaries | |
| Musadik Malik | Petroleum | Committee Member | ● Governor of State Bank of Pakistan ● Sixteen (16) Federal Secretaries | |
| Awais Leghari | Energy | Committee Member | ● Governor of State Bank of Pakistan ● Sixteen (16) Federal Secretaries | |
| Usman Awaisi | Railways | Committee Member | ● Governor of State Bank of Pakistan ● Sixteen (16) Federal Secretaries | |
| Khalid Maqbool Siddiqui | Science and Technology | Committee Member | ● Governor of State Bank of Pakistan ● Sixteen (16) Federal Secretaries | |

Cabinet Committee on State-Owned Enterprises (CCoSOEs)
| Minister | Referenced Office | Status | By Special Invitation/Co-Opted | Citation |
|---|---|---|---|---|
| Muhammad Aurangzeb | Finance | Chairman | ● Deputy Chairman of the Planning Commission | |
| Qaiser Ahmed Sheikh | Maritime | Committee Member | ● Deputy Chairman of the Planning Commission | |
| Aleem Khan | Economic Affairs | Committee Member | ● Deputy Chairman of the Planning Commission | |
| Awais Leghari | Energy | Committee Member | ● Deputy Chairman of the Planning Commission | |
| Khalid Maqbool Siddiqui | Science and Technology | Committee Member | ● Deputy Chairman of the Planning Commission | |
| Riaz Hussain Pirzada | Housing and Works | Committee Member | ● Deputy Chairman of the Planning Commission | |

Cabinet Committee on State-Owned Enterprises (CCoSOEs)
| Minister | Referenced Office | Status | By Special Invitation/Co-Opted | Citation |
|---|---|---|---|---|
| Khawaja Asif | Defense | Chairman | Secretary of the Privatisation Division; Chair may invite any Secretary or Head of Organization | |
| Muhammad Aurangzeb | Finance | Committee Member | Secretary of the Privatisation Division; Chair may invite any Secretary or Head of Organization | |
| Aun Chaudhry | Economic Affairs | Committee Member | Secretary of the Privatisation Division; Chair may invite any Secretary or Head of Organization | |
| Aleem Khan | Privatisation | Committee Member | Secretary of the Privatisation Division; Chair may invite any Secretary or Head of Organization | |
| Musadik Malik | Petroleum | Committee Member | Secretary of the Privatisation Division; Chair may invite any Secretary or Head of Organization | |

Cabinet Committee on Emigration, Overseas Employment and TVET (Note: Technical and Vocational Education & Training (TVET))
| Minister | Referenced Office | Status | By Special Invitation/Co-Opted | Citation |
|---|---|---|---|---|
| Shehbaz Sharif | Prime Minister | Chairman | ● National Coordinator of SIFC ● Governor of the State Bank of Pakistan ● Executive Director of NAVTTC ● Chairman of the Higher Education Commission | |
| Muhammad Aurangzeb | Overseas Pakistanis & HR Development | Committee Member | ● National Coordinator of SIFC ● Governor of the State Bank of Pakistan ● Executive Director of NAVTTC ● Chairman of the Higher Education Commission | |
| Ahad Cheema | Federal Education & Professional Training | Committee Member | ● National Coordinator of SIFC ● Governor of the State Bank of Pakistan ● Executive Director of NAVTTC ● Chairman of the Higher Education Commission | |
| Ishaq Dar | Foreign Affairs | Committee Member | ● National Coordinator of SIFC ● Governor of the State Bank of Pakistan ● Executive Director of NAVTTC ● Chairman of the Higher Education Commission | |
| Mohsin Naqvi | Interior | Committee Member | ● National Coordinator of SIFC ● Governor of the State Bank of Pakistan ● Executive Director of NAVTTC ● Chairman of the Higher Education Commission | |
| Mukhtar Ahmad Bharath | National Health Services | Committee Member | ● National Coordinator of SIFC ● Governor of the State Bank of Pakistan ● Executive Director of NAVTTC ● Chairman of the Higher Education Commission | |
| Rana Tanveer Hussain | Industries and Production | Committee Member | ● National Coordinator of SIFC ● Governor of the State Bank of Pakistan ● Executive Director of NAVTTC ● Chairman of the Higher Education Commission | |
| Jam Kamal Khan | Commerce | Committee Member | ● National Coordinator of SIFC ● Governor of the State Bank of Pakistan ● Executive Director of NAVTTC ● Chairman of the Higher Education Commission | |

Special Investment Facilitation Council Cabinet Committee (SIFC-CC)
| Minister | Referenced Office | Status | By Special Invitation/Co-Opted | Citation |
|---|---|---|---|---|
| Shehbaz Sharif | Prime Minister | Chairman | ● Chief of the Army Staff (COAS) ● Provincial Chief Ministers ● National Coordinator, SIFC | |
| Muhammad Aurangzeb | Finance | Committee Member | ● Chief of the Army Staff (COAS) ● Provincial Chief Ministers ● National Coordinator, SIFC | |
| Khawaja Asif | Defense | Committee Member | ● Chief of the Army Staff (COAS) ● Provincial Chief Ministers ● National Coordinator, SIFC | |
| Ahsan Iqbal | Planning | Committee Member | ● Chief of the Army Staff (COAS) ● Provincial Chief Ministers ● National Coordinator, SIFC | |
| Mohsin Naqvi | Information Technology | Committee Member | ● Chief of the Army Staff (COAS) ● Provincial Chief Ministers ● National Coordinator, SIFC | |
| Mukhtar Ahmad Bharath | Food Security | Committee Member | ● Chief of the Army Staff (COAS) ● Provincial Chief Ministers ● National Coordinator, SIFC | |
| Awais Leghari | Energy | Committee Member | ● Chief of the Army Staff (COAS) ● Provincial Chief Ministers ● National Coordinator, SIFC | |
| Jam Kamal Khan | Water | Committee Member | ● Chief of the Army Staff (COAS) ● Provincial Chief Ministers ● National Coordinator, SIFC | |
| Azam Nazeer Tarar | Law & Justice | Committee Member | ● Chief of the Army Staff (COAS) ● Provincial Chief Ministers ● National Coordinator, SIFC | |
| Aleem Khan | Investment | Committee Member | ● Chief of the Army Staff (COAS) ● Provincial Chief Ministers ● National Coordinator, SIFC | |
| Rana Tanveer Hussain | Industry | Committee Member | ● Chief of the Army Staff (COAS) ● Provincial Chief Ministers ● National Coordinator, SIFC | |
| Musadik Malik | Petroleum | Committee Member | ● Chief of the Army Staff (COAS) ● Provincial Chief Ministers ● National Coordinator, SIFC | |

== Reshuffles and non-cabinet appointments ==
Inaugural meeting of the federal cabinet, March 11, 2024

=== Ministerial level ===
On March 18, Awais Leghari was relieved from his portfolio as Minister for Railways in favour for taking over the Ministry of Energy, formerly under Musadik Malik. On 29 March, Amir Muqam was relieved of his additional portfolio as Federal Minister of National Heritage and Culture, instead taking over the Kashmir Affairs and Gilgit-Baltistan portfolio.

On April 4 five portfolios were assigned to different federal ministers previously held by the prime minister, Aleem Khan was given the additional portfolio of communications, Chaudhry Salik Hussain was allocated Religious Affairs and Interfaith Harmony, Rana Tanveer Hussain allocated Food Security & Research, Ahsan Iqbal was allocated inter-provincial coordination and Musadik Malik was allocated water resources.

MNA Ali Pervaiz was appointed as a Minister of State with the allocated portfolios of Finance & Revenue, with an additional portfolio of the Power Division on 17 May.

Foreign Minister Ishaq Dar was appointed Deputy Prime Minister of Pakistan through a notification from the Cabinet Division, this after the post had remained vacant for the past eleven years. Arifa Noor speculated in Dawn this was the result of Nawaz Sharif planning to reassert himself due to Ishaq Dar's "proximity" with Nawaz.

=== Other federal posts ===
Rana Sanaullah was appointed adviser to the prime minister on 30 April, approved by President Asif Ali Zardari. Speaking on a Geo News programme he confirmed that he had a meeting with the Prime Minister to include him the federal government. This was seen as a shift in party dynamics and the increasing influence of the Nawaz Sharif factions influence in the coalition government and coinciding with the appoint of another "trusted ally" of Nawaz Sharif, Ishaq Dar as Deputy Prime Minister of Pakistan. On 22 May Rana Sanaullah was given the Inter-provincial coordination portfolio.

On 28 March both Malik Mukhtar Ahmad Bharath and Rana Mashhood Ahmad Khan received appointments from circulars issued by the Cabinet Division. Mukhtar Ahmad appointed Coordinator to the Prime Minister on National Health Services, Regulations and Coordination and Rana Mashhood as Coordinator to the Prime Minister on Prime Minister's Youth Programme, both in an "honorary" capacity. The next day on the 29th, Rana Mashhood was appointed Chairman of the Youth Programme, also in an honorary capacity.

Later on 3 April Shehbaz Sharif appointed further coordinators Romina Khurshid Alam (Climate Change and Environmental coordination), Shabbir Ahmed Usmani (Kashmir Affairs and Gilgit-Baltistan) and Rana Ihsaan Afzal Khan on 'general issues'. The government claimed that the coordinators would not be part of the Federal Cabinet and work on an honorary basis.

== Constitutional institutions ==
=== Council of Common Interests ===
On 25 March 2024 Shehbaz Sharif reconstituted the eight-member Council of Common Interests (CCI) as chairman after a notification was issued. The Prime Minister inducted Khawaja Asif (Defense), Amir Muqam (SAFRON), and Ishaq Dar (Foreign Affairs) into the Council. The composition of the CCI marked the first time a foreign minister had been designated a member, replacing the membership of the finance minister. Abdullah Niazi an editor at Profit claimed that Muhammad Aurangzeb's role in the Cabinet was being undermined by Ishaq Dar, further remarking that the inclusion of Khwaja Asif and Engineer Amir Muqam might indicate Shehbaz Sharif's focus on giving party loyalists greater influence. According to Mushtaq Ghumman, finance ministers were not always included in the CCI however energy and planning ministers were. In the previous Pakistan Democratic Movement (PDM) government under Shehbaz Sharif the finance minister was not included in the CCI. Attaullah Tarar on March 29 would state that “nobody has been replaced or substituted," referencing the constitutional procedure of the CCI.

Summaries submitted by different ministries and provincial governments were returned for later resubmission following the re-constitution of the Council. CCI Secretary Omer Rasul stated that the summaries forwarded by ministries, divisions and provincial governments did not conform with the guidelines demarcated in Rules of Procedure of CCI (2010) and were ambiguous whether such cases fell within the purview of the CCI.

| Council of Common Interests (CCI) | | | | Ref |
| Office/Portfolio | Emblem | Minister | Status | Ref |
| Organic Composition | | | | |
|---|---|---|---|---|
| Prime Minister of Pakistan | | Shehbaz Sharif | Chairman of the Council | |
| Chief Ministers of Balochistan | | Sarfraz Bugti | Member | |
| Chief Minister of Khyber Pakhtunkhwa | | Sohail Afridi | Member | |
| Chief Ministers of Punjab | | Maryam Nawaz | Member | |
| Chief Minister of Sindh | | Murad Ali Shah | Member | |
Three Members Nominated by the PM
| Ministry of Foreign Affairs | | Ishaq Dar | Member | |
| Ministry of Defence | | Khawaja Asif | Member | |
| Ministry of States and Frontier Regions | | Amir Muqam | Member | |

=== National Economic Council ===
On June 7, 2024 President Asif Ali Zardari reconstituted the National Economic Council (NEC) of Pakistan under clause (1) of Article 156 of the constitution of Pakistan. The NEC being chaired by the Prime Minister Shehbaz Sharif, and includes the chief ministers of Sindh, KPK, Punjab and Balochistan, federal ministers, nominated provincial ministers and federal secretaries. On 10 June the NEC approved CPEC proposals and investment projects related to the then upcoming federal budget, and was submitted a five-year plan.

| National Economic Council (NEC) | | | | Ref |
| Office/Portfolio | Emblem | Minister | Status | Ref |
| Organic Composition | | | | |
|---|---|---|---|---|
| Prime Minister of Pakistan | | Shehbaz Sharif | Chairman of the Council | |
| Chief Ministers of Balochistan | | Sarfraz Bugti | Member | |
| Chief Minister of Khyber Pakhtunkhwa | | Sohail Afridi | Member | |
| Chief Ministers of Punjab | | Maryam Nawaz | Member | |
| Chief Minister of Sindh | | Murad Ali Shah | Member | |
Four Members Nominated by respective CMs
| Senior Minister (Note: Senior Minister for Planning & Development; Environment Protection and Climate Change, Fisheries & Wildlife; Chief Minister's Special Intitiatives) | | Marriyum Aurangzeb | Member | |
| Advisor to the Chief Minister on Finance | | Muzammil Aslam | Member | |
| Minister for Irrigation | | Jam Khan Shoro | Member | |
| Minister for Planning & Development | | Zahoor Ahmed Buledi | Member | |
Four Members Nominated by the PM
| Minister for Foreign Affairs | | Ishaq Dar | Member | |
| Minister for Defense | | Khawaja Asif | Member | |
| Minister for Finance, Revenue | | Muhammad Aurangzeb | Member | |
| Minister for Planning, Development | | Ahsan Iqbal | Member | |

== Criticism ==
The National Assembly's leader of the opposition, Omar Ayub and his party, the Pakistan Tehreek-e-Insaf (PTI) have accused Shehbaz Sharif of corruption, and his second ministry coming into power under allegations of rigging through a faulty electoral process. PTI have accused Shehbaz’s coalition of fascism. A (PTI) Spokesperson said the cabinet was fake, claiming it to be based on a stolen mandate. Further claiming the inclusion of people like Mohsin Naqvi in the federal cabinet proved the unconstitutional role of the caretaker government and Election Commission. Shehbaz Sharif has been accused of receiving backing from the military, and running a "hybrid pro-max" regime.
