= First Shehbaz Sharif government =

Federal Cabinet of Pakistan (2022–2023)

Federal Cabinet of Shehbaz Sharif
- 49th Cabinet of Pakistan
- 2022-2023
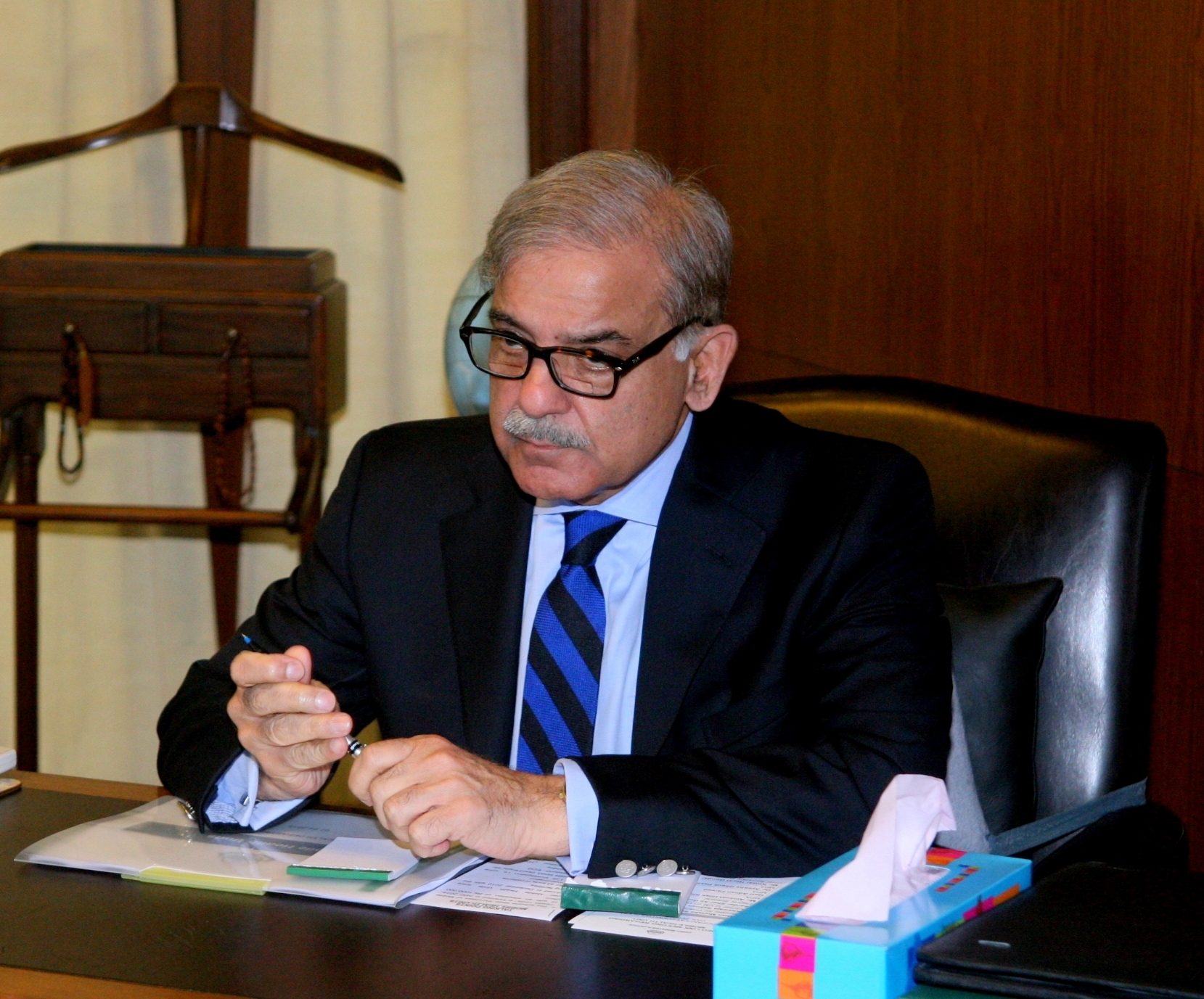
- Date formed: 11 April 2022
- Date dissolved: 9 August 2023

People and organisations
- Head of government: Shehbaz Sharif
- No. of ministers: 43
- Ministers removed: 1
- Total no. of members: 44
- Member party: PMLN; Coalition Partners: PPP; JUI (F); MQM-P; BAP; BNP-M; PML (Q); JWP; MQM-L; ANP; IND; PSP
- Status in legislature: National Assembly; Coalition government
- Opposition cabinet: Raja Riaz
- Opposition party: PTI
- Opposition leader: Raja Riaz

History
- Predecessor: Imran Khan government
- Successor: Kakar caretaker government

The Shehbaz Sharif government was formed on 10 April 2022, after Sharif was nominated as candidate for Prime Minister by opposition parties following a No-confidence motion against Imran Khan in incumbent prime minister Imran Khan during the 2022–2024 Pakistan political unrest.

He took oath as the Prime Minister of Pakistan on 11 April 2022. At the time of appointment, he had the majority 85 seats in the ruling alliance of 179 MNA from eight political parties and independent candidates.

The cabinet was dissolved following the dissolution of National Assembly of Pakistan on 9 August 2023 by President Arif Alvi upon advice of Prime Minister Shehbaz Sharif in accordance with Article 58-1 of Constitution of Pakistan.

== Cabinet ==
On 19 April 2022, the cabinet was formed, with 37 members taking the oath. Several more members joined the cabinet over the next few days.

As of March 2023, it consisted of 34 Federal Ministers, 7 Ministers of State, 4 Advisers to the Prime Minister and 39 Special Assistants to the Prime Minister. If Advisers and Special Assistants included, the cabinet is reportedly the largest in Pakistan's history. On this basis, the cabinet has been criticised as bloated and unaffordable, given the ongoing economic crisis. In a February 2023 article reporting on further appointments, The News International noted the high number of special assistants serving without portfolio. It further suggested these members were likely appointed in order to "please the appointees or their unknown recommenders." While advisers and special assistants are not officially cabinet members, and many do not claim a salary, they still enjoy the rank and status of cabinet members.

There are 19 SAPMs without any particular portfolio listed on the official website of the Cabinet Division, as well as Federal Minister Without Portfolio Mian Javed Latif.

=== Federal Ministers ===
Federal Ministers
#	Name	Portfolio	Party	Assumed office	Left office
1	Shehbaz Sharif	Prime Minister All important policy issues and all other portfolios not allocated to any Minister.	PMLN	11 April 2022	14 August 2023
2	Khawaja Asif	Defence	PMLN	19 April 2022	9 August 2023
3	Ahsan Iqbal	Planning, Development and Special Initiatives	PMLN	19 April 2022	9 August 2023
4	Rana Sanaullah	Interior	PMLN	19 April 2022	9 August 2023
5	Rana Tanveer Hussain	Federal Education and Professional Training	PMLN	19 April 2022	9 August 2023
6	Marriyum Aurangzeb	Information & Broadcasting	PMLN	19 April 2022	9 August 2023
7	Khawaja Saad Rafique	Railways and Aviation	PMLN	19 April 2022	9 August 2023
8	Azam Nazeer Tarar	Law and Justice	PMLN	19 April 2022	9 August 2023
9	Khurram Dastgir	Power	PMLN	19 April 2022	9 August 2023
10	Riaz Hussain Pirzada	Human Rights	PMLN	19 April 2022	9 August 2023
11	Murtaza Javed Abbasi	Parliamentary Affairs	PMLN	19 April 2022	9 August 2023
12	Mian Javed Latif	Minister without portfolio	PMLN	22 April 2022	9 August 2023
13	Ishaq Dar	Finance, Revenue and Economic affairs	PMLN	28 September 2022	9 August 2023
14	Syed Khurshid Ahmed Shah	Water Resources	PPP	19 April 2022	9 August 2023
15	Naveed Qamar	Commerce	PPP	19 April 2022	9 August 2023
16	Sherry Rehman	Climate Change	PPP	19 April 2022	9 August 2023
17	Abdul Qadir Patel	National Health Services, Regulations and Coordination	PPP	19 April 2022	9 August 2023
18	Shazia Marri	Poverty Alleviation and Social Safety	PPP	19 April 2022	9 August 2023
19	Makhdoom Syed Murtaza Mehmood	Industries & Production	PPP	19 April 2022	9 August 2023
20	Sajid Hussain Turi	Overseas Pakistanis and Human Resource Development	PPP	19 April 2022	9 August 2023
21	Ehsan ur Rehman Mazari	Inter Provincial Coordination	PPP	19 April 2022	9 August 2023
22	Abid Hussain Bhayo	Privatization	PPP	19 April 2022	9 August 2023
23	Bilawal Bhutto Zardari	Foreign Affairs	PPP	27 April 2022	9 August 2023
24	Asad Mehmood	Communications	JUI (F)	19 April 2022	9 August 2023
25	Abdul Wasay	Housing and Works	JUI (F)	19 April 2022	9 August 2023
27	Muhammad Talha Mahmood	States and Frontier Regions	JUI (F)	19 April 2022	9 August 2023
27	Muhammad Talha Mahmood	Religious Affairs and Interfaith Harmony	JUI (F)	18 April 2023	9 August 2023
28	Syed Aminul Haque	Information Technology and Telecommunication	MQM-P	19 April 2022	9 August 2023
29	Faisal Subzwari	Maritime Affairs	MQM-P	19 April 2022	9 August 2023
30	Muhammad Israr Tareen	Defence Production	BAP	19 April 2022	9 August 2023
31	Shahzain Bugti	Narcotics Control	JWP	19 April 2022	9 August 2023
32	Tariq Bashir Cheema	National Food Security and Research	PML(Q)	19 April 2022	9 August 2023
33	Chaudhry Salik Hussain	Board of Investment	PML(Q)	22 April 2022	9 August 2023
34	Agha Hassan Baloch	Science and Technology	BNP-M	22 April 2022	9 August 2023
35	Ayaz Sadiq	Economic Affairs	PMLN	19 April 2022	9 August 2023

=== Minister of State ===
Minister of State
#	Name	Party	Portfolio	Assumed office	Left office
1	Aisha Ghaus Pasha	PMLN	Finance and Revenue	19 April 2022	9 August 2023
2	Hina Rabbani Khar	PPP	Foreign Affairs	19 April 2022	9 August 2023
3	Abdul Rehman Khan Kanju	PMLN	Interior	19 April 2022	9 August 2023
4	Shahadat Awan	PPP	Law & Justice	19 April 2022	9 August 2023
5	Musadik Malik	PMLN	Petroleum	19 April 2022	9 August 2023
6	Muhammad Hashim Notezai	BNP(M)	Power	19 April 2022	9 August 2023
7	Ehsanullah Reki	BAP	Defence Production	29 July 2022	9 August 2023

=== Advisors ===
Advisors to the Prime Minister
#	Name	Party	Portfolio	Status	Assumed office	Left office
1	Qamar Zaman Kaira	PPP	Kashmir Affairs And Gilgit-Baltistan	Federal Minister	19 April 2022	9 August 2023
2	Amir Muqam	PMLN	Political and Public Affairs	Federal Minister	19 April 2022	9 August 2023
3	Aun Chaudhry	PMLN	Tourism and sports	Federal Minister	19 April 2022	9 August 2023
4	Ahad Cheema	PMLN	Advisor for Establishment	Federal Minister	9 June 2022	9 August 2023

=== Special Assistants to the Prime Minister ===
	Special Assistants to the Prime Minister					
#	Name	Party	Portfolio	Status	Assumed office	Left office
1	Tariq Fatemi	PMLN	Foreign Affairs	Minister of state	20 April 2022	9 August 2023
2	Hanif Abbasi	PMLN	N/A	Federal Minister	27 April 2022	2 June 2022
3	Muhammed Sadiq	MQM-P	Special Representative for Afghanistan	Minister of State	27 April 2022	9 August 2023
4	Syed Fahd Husain	MQM-P	Public Policy & Strategic Communications	Federal Minister	13 May 2022	April 2023
5	Shah Jahan Yousaf	PMLN	N/A	special assistant	28 June 2022	9 August 2023
6	Shaza Fatima Khawaja	PMLN	Youth Affairs	Minister of State	28 June 2022	9 August 2023
7	Muhammad Junaid Anwar Chaudhry	PMLN	N/A	Minister of State	28 June 2022	9 August 2023
8	Sheikh Fayyaz Ud Din	PMLN	N/A	Minister of State	28 June 2022	9 August 2023
9	Tariq Bajwa		Finance	Minister of State	28 June 2022	9 August 2023
10	Romina Khurshid Alam	PMLN	N/A	Minister of State	28 June 2022	9 August 2023
11	Shah Owais Noorani	MMA	N/A	Minister of State	28 June 2022	9 August 2023
12	Zafaruddin Mahmood	JUI (F)	N/A	Minister of State	28 June 2022	9 August 2023
13	Hafiz Abdul Kareem	PMLN	N/A	Federal Minister	28 June 2022	9 August 2023
14	Sadiq Iftikhar	MQM-P	Information Technology & Telecom	Minister of State	6 July 2022	9 August 2023
15	Muhammad Jehanzeb Khan	BAP	Government Effectiveness	Minister of State	14 July 2022	9 August 2023
16	Attaullah Tarar	PMLN	Narcotics control	Federal Minister	27 July 2022	9 August 2023
17	Malik Ahmad Khan	PMLN	Defence	Federal Minister	5 August 2022	9 August 2023
18	Rubina Irfan	PML(Q)	N/A	Minister of State	5 August 2022	9 August 2023
19	Malik Abdul Ghaffar Dogar	PMLN	N/A	Minister of State	5 August 2022	9 August 2023
20	Shaharyar Ali Khan	PPP	Privatisation	Minister of State	11 August 2022	9 August 2023
21	Faisal Karim Kundi	PPP	Poverty Alleviation and Social Safety	Minister of State	13 September 2022	9 August 2023
22	Iftikhar Ahmed Khan Babar	PPP	Kashmir Affairs & Gilgit Baltistan	Minister of State	13 September 2022	9 August 2023
23	Mehr Irshad Ahmed Sial	PPP	Inter Provincial Coordination	Minister of State	13 September 2022	9 August 2023
24	Raza Rabbani Khar	PPP	Commerce	Minister of State	13 September 2022	9 August 2023
25	Mahesh Kumar Malani	PPP	National Health Services, Regulations & Coordination	Minister of State	13 September 2022	9 August 2023
26	Sardar Saleem Haider Khan	PPP	Overseas Pakistani & HR Development	Minister of State	13 September 2022	9 August 2023
27	Tasneem Ahmed Qureshi	PPP	Industries & Production	Minister of State	13 September 2022	9 August 2023
28	Syed Muhammad Ali Shah Bacha	PPP	Water Resources	Minister of State	13 September 2022	9 August 2023
29	Shahjahan Yousuf	PML(Q)		Minister of State	13 September 2022	9 August 2023
30	Nauman Ahmad Langrial	PMLN	N/A	Minister of State	13 September 2022	9 August 2023
31	Irfan Qadir	BNP-M	Accountability & Interior	Federal Minister	7 October 2022	9 August 2023
32	Tariq Mehmood Pasha		Revenue	Minister of State	28 October 2022	9 August 2023
33	Rana Mubashir Iqbal	PMLN	N/A	Federal Minister	21 December 2022	9 August 2023
34	Fahd Haroon	PPP	Public Communication & Digital Platforms	Minister of State	19 January 2023	9 August 2023
35	Muhammad Jawad Sohrab Malik		N/A	Minister of State	2 February 2023	9 August 2023
36	Rao Muhammad Ajmal Khan	PMLN	N/A	Minister of State	7 February 2023	9 August 2023
37	Shaista Pervaiz	PMLN	N/A	Minister of State	7 February 2023	9 August 2023
38	Chaudhry Hamid Hameed	PMLN	N/A	Minister of State	7 February 2023	9 August 2023
39	Qaiser Ahmed Sheikh	PMLN	N/A	Minister of State	7 February 2023	9 August 2023
40	Malik Sohail Khan	PMLN	N/A	Minister of State	7 February 2023	9 August 2023
41	Chaudhry Abid Raza	PMLN	N/A	Minister of State	8 February 2023	9 August 2023
42	Muhammad Moeen Wattoo	PMLN	N/A	Minister of State	8 February 2023	9 August 2023
