= List of federal agencies of Pakistan =

A list of departments and agencies of the Government of Pakistan.

== President's Office ==
- Federal Ombudsman of Pakistan
- Banking Mohtasib Pakistan
- Federal Tax Ombudsman
- Federal Insurance Ombdusman
- Federal Ombudsman for Woman and Workplace

== Prime Minster's Office ==
- Special Investment Facilitation Council
- Board of Investment
- National Security Council
- National Disaster Management Authority
  - National Institute of Disaster Management
  - ERRA

== Ministry of Law and Justice ==
- Law and Justice Commission of Pakistan
- Federal Judicial Academy

== Ministry of Parliamentary Affairs ==
- National Assembly
- Senate

== Ministry of Privatisation ==
- Privatisation Commission
