= Kakar caretaker government =

Pakistani Caretaker Government, 2023–24

Anwar-ul-Haq Kakar Caretaker Government
- 50th Cabinet of Pakistan
- 17 August 2023
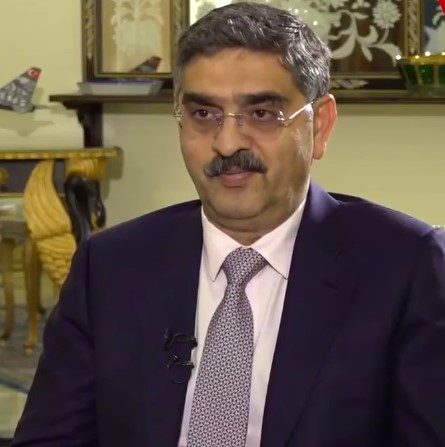
- Date formed: 17 August 2023
- Date dissolved: 4 March 2024

People and organisations
- Head of state: Arif Alvi
- Head of government: Anwaar ul Haq Kakar
- Status in legislature: Caretaker government

History
- Predecessor: First Shehbaz Sharif government
- Successor: Second Shehbaz Sharif government

The Kakar caretaker government was the Pakistani caretaker federal cabinet and government led by Anwaar ul Haq Kakar that was sworn into office on 17 August 2023.

Cabinet of Federal Ministers and Ministers of State ceased to hold their offices on 4 March 2024.

== List ==
=== Federal Ministers ===
Portfolio	Minister	Term
Prime Minister	Anwaar ul Haq Kakar	14 August 2023 – 4 March 2024
Finance, Revenue and Economic Affairs	Shamshad Akhtar	17 August 2023 – 4 March 2024
Foreign Affairs	Jalil Abbas Jilani	17 August 2023 – 4 March 2024
Defence, Defence Production	Anwar Ali Hyder	17 August 2023 – 4 March 2024
Interior, Narcotics Control, Overseas Pakistanis and Human Resource Development	Sarfraz Bugti	17 August 2023 – 15 December 2023
Commerce, Industries and Production	Gohar Ejaz	17 August 2023 – 4 March 2024
Law and Justice, Climate Change, Water Resources	Ahmad Irfan Aslam	17 August 2023 – 4 March 2024
Human Rights	Khalil Francis	17 August 2023 – 4 March 2024
Planning, Development and Special Initiatives	Sami Saeed	17 August 2023 – 4 March 2024
Communications, Maritime Affairs, Railways	Shahid Ashraf Tarar	17 August 2023 – 4 March 2024
Information and Broadcasting	Murtaza Solangi	17 August 2023 – 4 March 2024
Power and Petroleum	Muhammad Ali	17 August 2023 – 4 March 2024
Federal Education and Professional Training	Madad Ali Sindhi	17 August 2023 – 4 March 2024
National Health Services, Regulations and Coordination	Nadeem Jan	17 August 2023 – 4 March 2024
Religious Affairs and Inter-faith Harmony	Aneeq Ahmad	17 August 2023 – 4 March 2024
Information Technology and Telecommunication, Science and Technology	Umar Saif	17 August 2023 – 4 March 2024
National Heritage and Culture	Jamal Shah	17 August 2023 – 4 March 2024
National Food Security & Research	Kauser Abdullah Malik	11 September 2023 – 4 March 2024
Privatisation, Inter Provincial Coordination	Fawad Hasan Fawad	16 September 2023 – 4 March 2024

=== Advisors ===
Portfolio	Minister	Term
Aviation	Farhat Hussain Khan	17 August 2023 – 4 March 2024
Establishment	Ahad Cheema 17 August 2023 to 26 December 2023	17 August 2023 – 4 March 2024
Finance	Waqar Masood Khan	17 August 2023 – 4 March 2024

=== Special Assistants to the Prime Minister ===
Portfolio	Minister	Term
Human Rights, Women Empowerment	Mushaal Hussein Mullick	17 August 2023 – 4 March 2024
Overseas	Jawad Sohrab Malik	17 August 2023 – 4 March 2024
Maritime Affairs	Iftikhar Rao	17 August 2023 – 4 March 2024
Tourism	Wasi Shah	17 August 2023 – 4 March 2024
Government Effectiveness	Jehanzeb Khan	17 August 2023 – 4 March 2024
Education, National Harmony	Arfa Sayeda Zehra	17 August 2023 – 4 March 2024

== Controversies ==
=== Alleged confession of Rigging ===
On 4 May, during a tense confrontation between former Caretaker Prime Minister of Pakistan Anwaar ul Haq Kakar and PML-N leader Hanif Abbasi. Kakar issued a veiled warning, suggesting that if he were to disclose information about Form-47, the PML-N would find themselves in a difficult position. This exchange implied potential tampering in Form-47 during the election. However, Kakar later stated that his remarks were misrepresented by the media; he merely corrected Abbasi about the wheat scandal, implying that he never mentioned Form-47. Subsequently, PTI also demanded for an independent inquiry into the spat between Kakar and Abbasi and asserted that this verbal altercation has brought to light alleged election rigging.

=== Pakistan wheat import scandal ===
During the tenure of the caretaker ministry led by Kakar, 3.2m tonnes of wheat was unnecessarily imported leading to a crisis for farmers.
