= Irfan Qadir =

Pakistani lawyer and jurist (born 1956)

- عرفان قادر
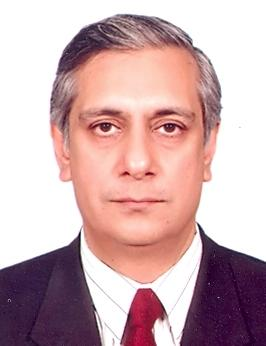

Advisor to Prime Minister in Cabinet of Pakistan
- Incumbent
- Assumed office 30 April 2024
- President: Asif Ali Zardari
- Prime Minister: Shehbaz Sharif

Special Assistant to the Prime Minister for Accountability & Interior
- In office 30 September 2022 – 10 August 2023
- President: Arif Alvi
- Prime Minister: Shehbaz Sharif

29th Attorney-General for Pakistan
- In office 12 April 2012 – 7 June 2013
- President: Asif Ali Zardari
- Prime Minister: Yousaf Raza Gillani; Raja Pervaiz Ashraf
- Preceded by: Maulvi Anwar-ul-Haq
- Succeeded by: Munir A. Malik

Prosecutor General of National Accountability Bureau
- In office 2010–2013
- President: Asif Ali Zardari
- Prime Minister: Yousaf Raza Gillani; Raja Pervaiz Ashraf
- In office 2003–2006
- President: Pervez Musharraf
- Prime Minister: Zafarullah Khan Jamali; Shujaat Hussain; Shaukat Aziz

Justice of Lahore High Court
- In office 2009–2009
- Appointed by: Salman Taseer

Additional Advocate General of Punjab
- In office 1996–1997
- In office 1990–1995

Personal details
- Born: 16 November 1956 (age 69) Lahore, Punjab, Pakistan
- Occupation: Lawyer; Jurist

Irfan Qadir (Urdu, Punjabi: عرفان قادر; born 16 November 1956) is a Pakistani lawyer and jurist who is the incumbent Special Assistant to the Prime Minister for Law since 30 April 2024. Previously, he served as the Special Assistant to the Prime Minister on Accountability and Interior from September 2022 to August 2023. He also served as the 29th Attorney-General for Pakistan from April 2012 to June 2013, and was a Justice of the Lahore High Court in 2009.

Irfan previously served as Secretary of Ministry of Law, Justice and Parliamentary Affairs in 2012, twice as the Additional Advocate General of the Punjab from 1990 to 1995 and 1996 to 1997, and as Prosecutor General of the Punjab in 2010.

== Early life and education ==
Irfan was born in 1956 in Lahore, West Pakistan to a Punjabi Muslim family. His father, Mian Abdul Qadir was a bureaucrat and served as the chairman of Pakistan Railways. He did his graduation BA, LLB from University of the Punjab in Lahore.

He is the son-in-law of late Justice Aslam Riaz Hussain. Aslam Riaz Hussain (1924 – 10 March 2004) was a former Pakistani jurist and the first ombudsman who served as 28th chief justice of the Lahore High Court from 1976 to 1978, and 19th governor of Punjab from July 1977 to September 1978.

== Professional career ==
Irfan Qadir began his legal career in 1982 and enrolled as a High Court Advocate in 1985. Since then, he has built up a substantial body of experience in all key areas of law by handling numerous significant cases in both the Supreme Court and the High Court and providing numerous reported judgments.

In addition, he has experience representing Pakistan internationally, having participated in numerous seminars and workshops at significant conferences in Europe, Asia, Africa, and America. From 2006 through 2012, he continued to be a part of the International Corruption Hunters Network. Additionally, he is a fellow of the Eva Joly Institute for Justice and Democracy in Iceland. He is one of the original members of the 2006 Beijing-founded International Association of Anti-Corruption Authorities.

In addition to serving as a member of the Pakistani Judicial Commission and the Pakistan Law Commission, he has also served as chairman of the Pakistan Bar Council in his capacity as the Attorney-General for Pakistan. He gained knowledge in every area of the legal field, including that of a successful lawyer, superior court judge, high-ranking law officer, and top bureaucrat. He has handled a significant number of important cases in the Supreme Court and the High Court over the last three decades, giving him extensive experience in nearly all key areas of law.

=== Special Assistant to the Prime Minister for Law (April 2024- present) ===
In the Second Shehbaz Sharif's ministry, Irfan was appointed to the position of Special Assistant to Prime Minister Shehbaz Sharif for law with the status of Federal Minister on 30 April 2024. According to a notification, Irfan's status will be equivalent to that of a federal minister.

=== Special Assistant to the Prime Minister (October 2022- March 2023) ===
In Shehbaz Sharif's ministry Irfan, was appointed to the position of Special Assistant to Prime Minister Shehbaz Sharif for accountability & interior with the status of Federal Minister on 30 September 2022. According to a notification, Irfan's status will be equivalent to that of a federal minister.

The News reported that because Qadir has an exceptional legal background, his inclusion in the federal government would strengthen the legal and prosecution side of the administration of law.

=== Attorney General for Pakistan (2012-2013) ===
Irfan was chosen as AGP by Prime Minister Syed Yousuf Raza Gilani following consultation with Federal Law Minister Farooq H. Naek.

The reorganization took place as the government anticipates hostile rulings from the proactive judiciary in the case against Prime Minister Yusuf Raza Gilani for contempt of court and for failing to enforce the court's ruling against the defunct National Reconciliation Order (NRO).

=== Secretary, Ministry of Law (2012) ===
Prior to taking office as his nation's Attorney General, he served as federal secretary for the Ministry of Law, Justice, and Parliamentary Affairs.

=== Prosecutor General NAB (2010) ===
Irfan Qadir was appointed Prosecutor General of National Accountability Bureau by President Asif Ali Zardari in 2010 but Supreme Court ruled that NAB, Irfan Qadir's appointments as prosecutor general were unlawful.

==== Supreme Court decision against appointment ====
This decision was made by the three-member panel led by Chief Justice Iftikhar Muhammad Chaudhry after they heard a petition asking for Irfan Qadir to be reappointed as NAB's prosecutor general. Justices Khalil-ur-Rehman Ramday and Ghulam Rabbani made up the rest of the SC bench. A day after the NAB prosecutor general's outburst in the Supreme Court, the prime minister Yusuf Raza Gilani issued an order to withdraw his privileges. The prime minister had stated that orders from the Supreme Court will be carried out in letter and spirit and that he had given the law secretary instructions for doing so.

==== Argument and challenged SC ruling ====
Because the president was the one who appointed the NAB prosecutor general, Qadir once argued that he was only subject to orders made by the president and not the prime minister. He added that the PM, who is in charge of the NAB, makes the decisions and challenged the Supreme Court's ruling regarding his removal.

==== Resignation ====
Prosecutor General of the National Accountability Bureau, Qadir submitted his resignation to President Asif Ali Zardari on September 8, 2010, after contesting the Supreme Court's directives for his dismissal but he did not withdraw his appeal filed before the apex court challenging its order which had declared his appointment as illegal, on instructions of the president.

=== Judge Lahore High Court (2009) ===
President Asif Ali Zardari nominated 16 additional judges to the Lahore High Court (LHC) in February 2009, bringing the total number of justices on the high court up to 52 and Irfan Qadir was one of them.

==== Court ruling against PCO judges ====
Irfan didn't qualify to be appointed as judge of the Supreme Court, after he had left as high court judge for being a Provisional Constitutional Order (PCO) justice due to the apex court ruling of 31 July 2009. Before his retirement, President Asif Ali Zardari had nominated 26 judges of the Lahore High Court in consultation with Chief Justice Abdul Hameed Dogar.

=== Prosecutor General NAB (2003-2006) ===
He had also worked for the NAB's Prosecutor General Accountability between 2003 and 2006. The only Prosecutor General in the Pakistan to have served the full three years in this position is he.

=== Law Practice (1997-2003) ===
He did an active law practice from 1997 to 2003 in different High Courts of Pakistan and Supreme Court of Pakistan.

=== Acting Advocate General Punjab (1996-1997) ===
He also served as Acting Advocate General Punjab from 1996 to 1997.

=== Additional Advocate General Punjab (1990-1995) ===
From 1990 to 1995, he was promoted to more senior position of Additional Advocate General Punjab.

=== Assistant Advocate General Punjab (1988-1990) ===
In 1988, he was appointed as an Assistant Advocate General Punjab. He served on this post until 1990.

== Legal career ==
He has been consistently participating in significant matters at the Supreme Court for the past more than 30 years. He has a number of recorded cases in Pakistan's higher courts to his credit in terms of his career as a lawyer. Both as a lawyer and a law enforcement official, he has had a very successful career.

=== CM Punjab election vs Supreme court (July 2022) ===
On 26 July 2022, the Punjab Chief Minister's election case was decided by the Supreme Court of Pakistan, which deemed Dost Mazari's decision as the deputy speaker of the provincial assembly to be illegal. Pervez Elahi, the PML-Q, leader's was also named the new chief minister of the province by the court. The three-judge panel, which was led by Chief Justice of Pakistan Umar Ata Bandial and also included Justices Ijazul Ahsan and Muneeb Akhtar, issued the ruling after a three-hour delay and instructed Governor Punjab to swear in Elahi at 11:30 p.m. tonight.

The Mazari's decision, which allowed Hamza Shahbaz to continue serving as the province's chief minister, was challenged by the PML-Q in a petition that was submitted on Saturday 23 July 2022 through the PML-Q attorney Amir Saeed Rawn and the Irfan Qadir was the attorney from the deputy speaker Dost Mazari.

==== Petition ====
On, Saturday 23 July 2022 Pervaiz Elahi submitted a plea to the Supreme Court Lahore registry contesting the re-election of Hamza Shehbaz as the province's chief minister. He urged the court to reverse the deputy speaker's ruling about the CM election vote count in his appeal. He asserted that because of his illegal and unconstitutional order, the deputy speaker did not count the votes cast by the PML-Q. He maintained that the decision went against the Supreme Court's directive.

Pervaiz Elahi asserted that the deputy speaker's choice also broke Article 63-A. At midnight on Friday, Lahore Registry Deputy Registrar Ejaz Gorayra and other personnel raced to their offices in response to the plea being filed by PML-Q attorney Amir Saeed Rawn.

==== Coalition govt petition ====
Pakistan Peoples Party and Jamiat Ulema-e-Islam petitioned the Supreme Court to become a party in the case however, the Supreme Court dismissed the JUI(F) petition impartially and accepted the PPP's petition.

==== Full court plea and objection on bench ====
A three-judge Supreme Court bench, presided over by Chief Justice Bandial and including Justices Ijazul Ahsan and Munib Akhtar, heard the case in the court's Lahore registry. The Supreme Court decided to name Hamza Shehbaz as Punjab's interim chief minister until Monday 25 July 2022, when the court will reassemble to consider the case. Hamza was forbidden by the Supreme Court from using his CM authority for political gain. According to the CJP, the deputy speaker's decision was clearly in violation of the Article 63-A ruling.

The coalition government objected to the three-judge bench after the earlier Supreme Court decision and asked for the creation of a full court bench, citing the significance of the case. Speaking with PDM Chief Maulana Fazlur Rehman about submitting a petition for a full court bench was Prime Minister Shehbaz Sharif. PML-Q president Chaudhry Shujaat and Maulana Fazal also spoke about the case over the phone.

==== Full court plea rejected ====
The Supreme Court had denied the coalition government's request to create a full court bench on issues relating to the Punjab chief minister election held on 22 July 2022 after receiving a full court appeal from PDM. A full court bench is constituted in serious matters, the CJP stated. According to Chief Justice Bandial, the main issue before the bench was whether or not a party leader could give orders to his parliamentary party members.

This affects the entire province. I don't want to imply that the bench's impartiality is in doubt. The respect and confidence in the court would rise if a full court is constituted, according to Mazari's attorney, Irfan Qadir.

==== Boycott SC proceedings ====
The Pakistani coalition government declared it would boycott the court proceedings after criticising the Supreme Court's choice to not convene a full bench to hear a crucial case involving the contentious election of the Punjab Chief Minister. At a press conference in Islamabad, PDM leader Maulana Fazlur Rehman claimed that the government's attorneys had recommended a full bench, but the court had rejected their recommendation without giving it any thought.

==== Verdict ====
Following a series of incidents, The Supreme Court of Pakistan ruled on the election of the Punjab Chief Minister on July 26, 2022, and in its ruling, the court found Dost Mazari's choice to serve as deputy speaker of the provincial legislature to be unlawful. The court also appointed PML-Q leader Pervez Elahi as the new chief minister of the province. After a three-hour delay, the three-judge panel, which was presided over by Chief Justice of Pakistan Umar Ata Bandial and composed of Justices Ijazul Ahsan and Muneeb Akhtar, handed down its decision and ordered Governor Punjab to appoint Elahi at 11:30 p.m. tonight.

=== Consultant to the President of Pakistan (2012) ===
He was appointed legal affairs consultant to Pakistan's President Asif Ali Zardari in March 2012.

=== Appellate Authority of PCB (2010) ===
He was also appointed as the Pakistan Cricket Board's Appellate Authority in 2010.

== License cancellation ==
In March 2015 a three-judge panel of the supreme court of Pakistan suspended his license to practice law due to his conduct and appearance as counsel for the Sindh Government in a case involving the purchase of armored personnel carriers worth Rs1.23 billion by the Sindh Police from a Serbian company.

The court also requested information from Inspector-general of police, Sindh regarding the payment of Irfan's fees, with further instructions to identify the payer. Earlier, the IG Sindh informed the court that of the Rs3 million in agreed-upon fees, Rs2 million had already been given to Qadir. The court had further noted that there was no Wakalat Nama filed authorizing Irfan Qadir to appear in this case. The court had instructed its office to contact the Karachi Registry to determine whether any of the attorneys on file had submitted a Wakalat Nama allowing Irfan Qadir to appear in court in the current case.

The court ruled that after asking, it was told that no such direction had been given. Irfan has appeared in this matter for the last 11 hearings, and the court has expressed concerns about how and on what grounds he has done so. The court had requested additional advocate general Sindh to investigate the source of Qadir's fees. However, the additional advocate general wanted more time to obtain such information. Irfan Qadir was ordered by the court to appear before it on next hearing to give an explanation for remarks he made earlier before the bench, and the court also ordered its office to send a copy of the order to him.

=== Restoration ===
In February 2019 Irfan's practicing license was reinstated by the Supreme Court after a nearly four-year absence. While hearing the case, a three-judge Supreme Court panel led by Chief Justice Asif Saeed Khosa ordered that the former attorney general's practicing license should be reinstated. Mehmood Akhtar Naqvi's petition for the Chief Justice of Pakistan to hear the former AG's contempt of court case was granted.

The chief judge noted that the contempt charge was only one aspect of the case involving the license reinstatement. He claimed that since the petitioner was not in court and no request for an adjournment had been made by him, the case could no longer be continued. The bench then announced that Irfan's licence to practise law had been reinstated and concluded the contempt of court proceedings against him.

Then, Justice Khosa welcomed Qadir back into the legal community and wished him well in his future interactions with the bench. In response, Irfan Qadir also thanked the chief justice for giving him his due after four years.

== International exposure ==
Having represented Pakistan in numerous seminars and workshops in significant forums in Europe, Asia, Africa, and America, Irfan has had significant exposure abroad. From 2006 through 2012, he continued to be a part of the International Corruption Hunters Network. Additionally, he is a fellow of the Eva Joly Institute for Justice and Democracy in Iceland. He is a founding member of the Beijing-based International Association of Anti-Corruption Authorities, which was founded in 2006.

Political offices
New office	Special Assistant to the Prime Minister for accountability & interior 30 September 2022–present	Succeeded by Incumbent
Legal offices
Preceded by Maulvi Anwar-ul-Haq	Attorney-General for Pakistan; 12 April 2012-7 June 2013	Succeeded by Munir A. Malik
