= National Education Assessment System =

Defunct education initiative of the Government of Pakistan

The National Education Assessment System (NEAS), (Urdu: قومی نظامِ تشخیصِ تعلیم) was an initiative of the Government of Pakistan aimed at identifying gaps, challenges, and diagnosing the strengths and weaknesses of the education system by measuring students' learning achievements. It sought to facilitate appropriate decision-making to promote access, equity, and quality in the education system. National assessments were conducted across the country in five subjects each for Grade 4 and Grade 8 on a sample basis every four years. These assessments provided insights into the health of the education system for better understanding by stakeholders.

The NEAS aimed to highlight both the strengths and weaknesses of the education system, presenting facts about students' learning achievements along with recommendations for effective implementation. This practice was not unique to Pakistan, as the past decade witnessed fluctuations affecting national assessments in various subjects and grade levels.

Initially established as a five-year development project in 2003 with financial assistance from the World Bank and the Department for International Development (DfID), NEAS was later institutionalized at the national level with the cooperation of provincial and area assessment centers. Despite its project-based origins, NEAS became a regular feature of the education system before the closure of its project life. Over time, NEAS published four national-level assessment reports covering two grades each with four subjects. The National Achievement Test (NAT) - 2014 represented progress from previous studies by introducing English as a subject for the first time and analyzing students' performance against proficiency benchmarks.

== Recent Report ==
The National Education Assessment System (NEAS) conducted the National Achievement Test in 2014, and the study's findings were disseminated during a conference on September 3, 2015. These findings offer valuable insights for individuals interested in enacting positive changes within the Pakistani educational system. The NAT-2014 Report marks a significant milestone in the history of NEAS, as it was conducted by NEAS in collaboration with provincial PEACe's and Area Centers under the guidance of the Ministry of Federal Education and Professional Training Pakistan.
