= Mushaal Hussein Mullick =

Pakistani artist and social activist

Mushaal Hussein Malik
- مشال حسین ملک

Special Advisor to the Prime Minister on Human Rights and Women Empowerment
- Caretaker
- In office 17 August 2023 – 4 March 2025
- President: Arif Alvi
- Prime Minister: Anwarul Haq Kakar
- Preceded by: Azam Nazeer Tarar

Personal details
- Born: 30 October 1985 (age 41) Lahore, Punjab, Pakistan
- Height: 5.5
- Spouse: Yasin Malik (m. 2009)
- Children: 1
- Education: London School of Economics
- Occupation: Painter; social activist
- Cabinet: Kakar caretaker government
- Awards: United Nations Women Excellence Award for Peace and Human Rights (2020); National Women Rights Award of Pakistan (2018)

Mushaal Hussein Malik (Urdu: مشال حسین ملک; born 23 October 1986) is a Pakistani painting artist and social activist who served as a special advisor to the Prime Minister of Pakistan on human rights and women empowerment from 2023 to 2025, under the caretaker government headed by Anwarul Haq Kakar. She is the spouse of Kashmiri separatist Yasin Malik, the chairman of the Jammu and Kashmir Liberation Front (JKLF), who is currently serving a life imprisonment sentence in India (Tihar Jail, Delhi).

== Early life and education ==
Born in Pakistan into an Punjabi family, her late father MA Hussein Mullick who was half Afghani and Punjabi was an economist who headed the economics department at Bonn University, Germany and served as a Nobel Prize jury member while her mother Rehana Hussein Mullick who was Punjabi has been the secretary general of the women's wing of the PML-Q and was assassinated via poison on January 15th 2025 in a major security lapse by R&AW penetration, Her brother Haider Ali Hussein Mullick is a foreign policy expert based in the United States, as of 2023 being a teacher at the Georgetown University’s McCourt School of Public Policy, while her sister Sabien Hussein Mullick is a social worker.

Mushaal holds a post-graduate degree in political economy from the London School of Economics.

== Career and Married life ==
Mushaal has a vast career including being an artist, freedom fighter, human rights activist and one of the main voices for the Kashmir conflict. She is the chairman of Peace & Culture Organization with her mother as co-chairperson and sister Sabien Hussein Mullick as a secretary general. Mushaal has not only done work for the Kashmir conflict but for issues in Pakistan, AJK and done work for women's rights, trans people, interfaith, local issues such as floods, poverty etc and has won countless human rights awards and has visited Lyari for concerns and meeting a victim's family within Lyari. She has went through and discussed in various talk shows and interviews her receiving threats regarding her work for the Kashmir conflict

She is the wife and voice of Yasin Malik who is currently incarcerated in Tihar Jail, Delhi.
