= Cabinet Secretariat (Pakistan) =

Administrative secretariat to the prime minister of Pakistan

Cabinet Division کابینہ سیکریٹیریٹ

Agency overview
- Formed: August 14, 1947; 78 years ago
- Jurisdiction: Government of Pakistan
- Headquarters: Constitution Avenue, Islamabad, Pakistan
- Annual budget: FY25-26 federal budget
- Minister responsible: Shahbaz Sharif (Prime Minister of Pakistan)
- Agency executive: Kamran Ali Afzal (Cabinet Secretary)
- Website: www.cabinet.gov.pk

The Cabinet Division is an administrative secratariat responsible for administration of the Government of Pakistan. The Cabinet Division provides bureaucratic assistance between the Cabinet of Pakistan and the Prime Minister of Pakistan, and facilitates coordination between federal executive ministries and independent federal agencies of the Government of Pakistan.

The Cabinet Division functions and reports under the Prime Minister of Pakistan and its business operations are directed by the Cabinet Secretary. Currently, Dr. Karmran Ali Afzal is currenytly serving the cabinet secretary as of 2026.

== History ==
The Cabinet Secretariat of Pakistan was established soon after the country gained independence in 1947. Initially, it played a role in supporting the newly-formed federal government by assisting with policy-making and ensuring the proper execution of decisions. Over time, its role expanded, and the Cabinet Secretariat became central to the coordination of government operations. It plays a crucial role in maintaining administrative efficiency, and ensuring that government decisions are effectively implemented.

== Functions and responsibilities ==
The Cabinet Secretariat undertakes several essential functions such as assisting the prime minister and the Cabinet by preparing schedules for meetings, recording decisions, and ensuring that these decisions are communicated to relevant ministries and agencies for execution.

The Secretariat also acts as a central coordinating body among ministries, addressing inter-ministerial conflicts and ensuring alignment of government policies. It monitors the implementation of Cabinet decisions to ensure they are executed in a timely and efficient manner.

In addition, the Secretariat manages public grievances related to government functions, directing complaints to the appropriate departments and overseeing corrective measures. It coordinates with provincial governments to ensure consistent application of federal policies across Pakistan’s provinces.

The Cabinet Secretariat also plays a central role in civil service management through its Establishment Division, which handles appointments, promotions, and general administration within the federal civil service.

== Organizational Structure ==
The head of the Cabinet Secretariat is the Cabinet Secretary, a senior civil servant appointed by the prime minister. The Cabinet Secretary acts as the principal liaison between the government and the bureaucracy, ensuring the smooth execution of Cabinet decisions.

The Cabinet Secretariat is organized into multiple divisions, each responsible for specific functions. The primary divisions include:

- Cabinet Division: Responsible for managing Cabinet meetings, recording minutes, and circulating decisions to the relevant ministries.
- Establishment Division: Oversees recruitment, training, promotions, and overall management of the civil service.
- National Security Division: Supports the National Security Committee and handles matters related to national security.
- Aviation Division: The Aviation Division leads the development and implementation of strategies, policies, and oversight for all aspects of civil aviation. Its primary focus is on civil aviation matters, leveraging its expertise in both organizational structure and human resources.
- Poverty Alleviation Division: Formulates and implements policies and programs aimed at reducing poverty, improving social safety nets, and providing assistance to vulnerable segments of society.

== Role in Governance ==
The Cabinet Secretariat is fundamental to the governance framework of Pakistan. It ensures that the policies of the government, as decided by the prime minister and the Cabinet, are implemented effectively. By facilitating inter-ministerial coordination, providing feedback, and monitoring the implementation of policies, the Cabinet Secretariat ensures that the federal government functions smoothly. Additionally, the Secretariat provides administrative support to various high-level government committees, including the Economic Coordination Committee and the National Security Committee.

== Challenges and Reforms ==
The Cabinet Secretariat, like many other government institutions, faces challenges such as bureaucratic inefficiency, inter-ministerial conflicts, and delays in policy implementation. Over the years, various reforms have been proposed and introduced to improve transparency, reduce delays, and enhance the capacity of the civil service.

The Secretariat also focused on digitizing government records, improving coordination through automation, and restructuring the civil service to enhance accountability.

== Cabinet Committees ==
There are several Cabinet Committees that oversee policy implementations on various initiatives of Government of Pakistan. Some of them are listed below:

=== Economic Coordination Committee (ECC) ===
Works to ensure that the country’s economic policies are implemented efficiently across ministries.

=== Cabinet Committee on Energy ===
Cabinet Committee on Energy (CCoE)
Executive	Designation
Permanent Members	
Minister for Power & Petroleum	Chairman
Minister for Finance, Revenue, Economic Affairs & Privatization	Member
Minister for Planning, Development & Special Initiatives	Member
Minister for Communications, Railways & Maritime Affairs	Member
Minister for Law & Justice, Climate Change & Water Resources	Member
Additional Members	
Adviser to the Prime Minister on Establishment	
Adviser to the Prime Minister on Finance	
Deputy Chairman Planning Commission	
Secretary, Finance Division	
Secretary, Power Division	
Secretary, Petroleum Division	
Secretary, Law & Justice Division	
Chairman, NEPRA	
Chairman, OGRA	
