= Murtaza Solangi =

Pakistani journalist

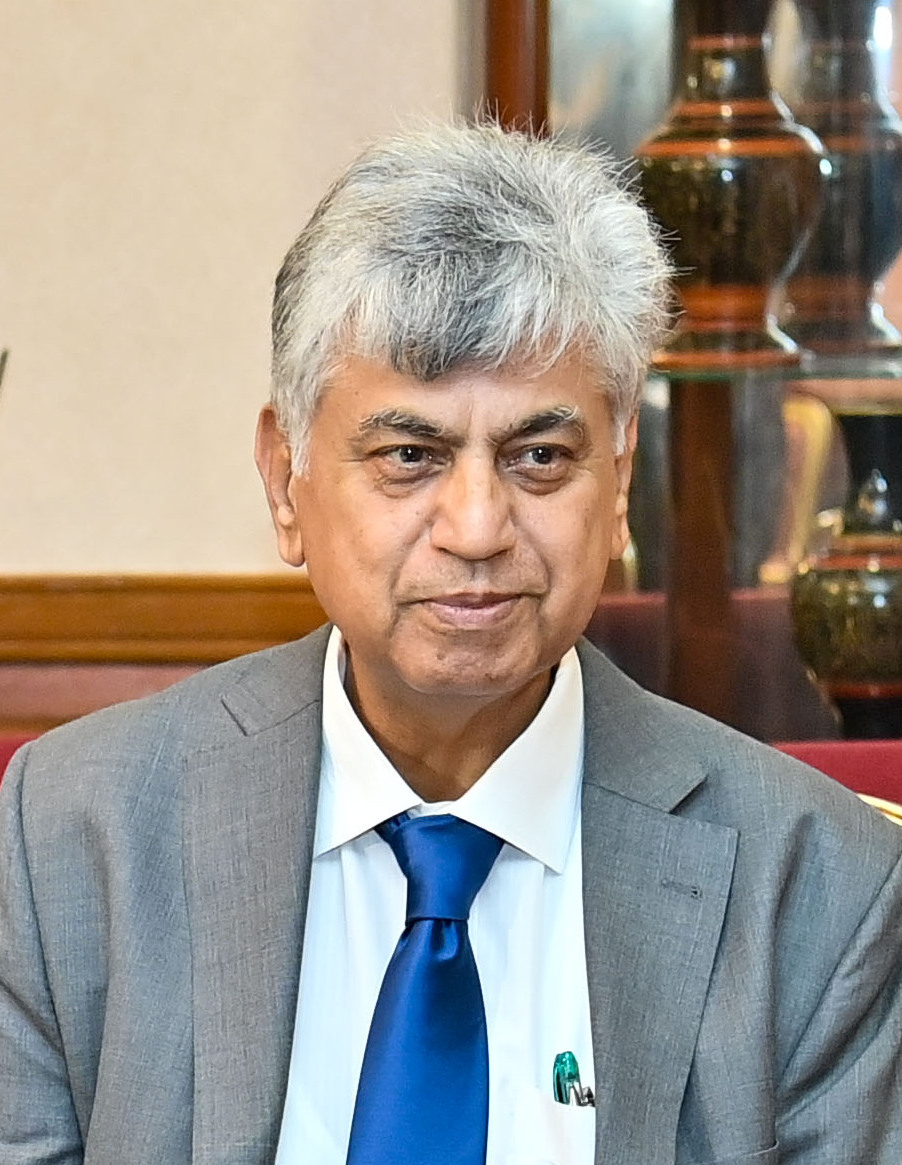

Federal Minister for Information and Broadcasting
- Caretaker
- In office 17 August 2023 – 4 March 2024
- Preceded by: Marriyum Aurangzeb
- Succeeded by: Attaullah Tarar

Personal details
- Born: 1966 (age 59–60) Islamabad, Pakistan
- Education: Quaid-i-Azam University
- Profession: Journalist, Broadcaster

Murtaza Solangi is a Pakistani journalist who served as a Director General of Radio Pakistan. He was the caretaker Minister of Information and Broadcasting from August 2023 to March 2024.

== Career ==
In 2010, he was accused of harassment by female officials while he was Director General of the Pakistan Broadcasting Corporation. Previously, he worked as a broadcaster at VOA's Urdu broadcasting service.

In August 2023 he was appointed caretaker Minister of Information and Broadcasting.
