= British influence in Pakistan =

The Dominion of Pakistan (later the Islamic Republic of Pakistan) was founded in 1947 as a result of the independence of India from British rule, when India was simultaneously partitioned to create Pakistan (in two non-contiguous halves called East Pakistan & West Pakistan). East Pakistan seceded in 1971 as a result of the Language Movement followed by the Bangladesh War of Independence, and West Pakistan has continued the Pakistani national identity since. Pakistan is a member of the Commonwealth of Nations.

British rule greatly influenced language, public administration, education, architecture, communication, the political system and system of government, thinking and culture in the lands that Pakistan inherited.

== Government ==
Pakistan is a parliamentary democratic republic in the Westminster tradition. The structure of government is outlined by the Constitution of Pakistan and takes a federal form. The government is composed principally of the executive, legislative, and judicial branches, in which all powers are vested in the Parliament, the Prime Minister and the Supreme Court.

On 3 June 1947, Viceroy of India Lord Mountbatten called a conference of leaders of the Indian subcontinent and communicated his government's plan for transferring power. A notification in the Gazette of India published on 26 July 1947 established the Constituent Assembly of Pakistan. The assembly was originally intended to have 69 members. However, the number was later increased to 79. The first session of the Constituent Assembly of Pakistan was held on 10 August 1947.

With the Independence Act of 1947, the existing constituent assemblies became dominion legislatures. Although Pakistan has endured periods of military and martial rule, the country now holds regular parliamentary elections.

== Architecture ==
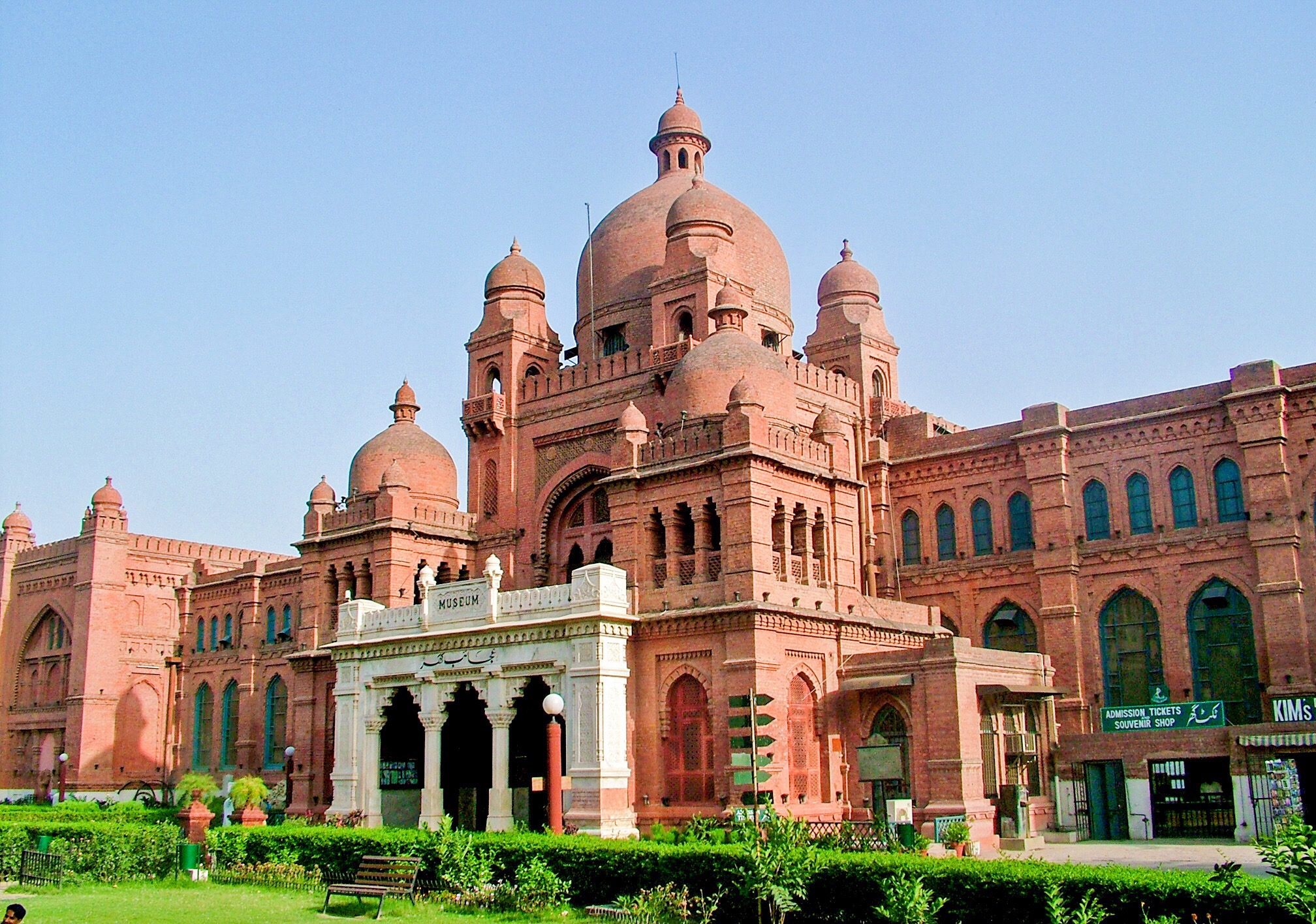
Lahore Museum

The British introduced a new style of colonial architecture. In Lahore, a synthesis of Gothic, Victorian, Muslim and ancient Indian architectural elements developed. In Karachi, examples of colonial-era architecture include the Imperial Customs House and Jahangir Kothari Parade promenade, now obscured by subsequent developments.

== English language ==
English is the official language of Pakistan. A local variant exists.

== Communication ==
The British Raj left a large network of railways, roads, as well as the telephone and telegraph system.

The first railway line in the modern-day Pakistan was constructed in 1858 in Karachi. A line between Karachi City and Kotri opened in 1861. The railway network built by the British remains intact today.

== Sport ==
Cricket was introduced to the South Asian Subcontinent by Britain. It is now the most popular sport in Pakistan.

== See also ==
- Anglicisation#South Asia
- British Pakistanis
- Britons in Pakistan
- Culture of Pakistan
