= Musadik Malik =

Pakistani politician

Ministry of Climate Change and Environmental Coordination
- Incumbent
- Assumed office 7 March 2025
- President: Asif Ali Zardari
- Prime Minister: Shehbaz Sharif

Federal Minister for Petroleum and Water Resources
- In office 11 March 2024 – 7 March 2025
- President: Asif Ali Zardari
- Prime Minister: Shehbaz Sharif
- In office 28 April 2022 – 10 August 2023
- President: Asif Ali Zardari
- Prime Minister: Shehbaz Sharif
- Preceded by: Hammad Azhar
- Succeeded by: Ahmad Irfan Aslam
- In office 3 April 2013 – 4 June 2013
- Prime Minister: Mir Hazar Khan Khoso
- Preceded by: Shahid Khaqan Abbasi
- Succeeded by: Hammad Azhar

Member of The Senate of Pakistan
- Incumbent
- Assumed office March 2018
- President: Arif Alvi; Asif Ali Zardari

Special Assistant to the Prime Minister on Media Affairs
- In office 4 August 2017 – 31 May 2018
- Prime Minister: Shahid Khaqan Abbasi

Spokesperson for the Prime Minister of Pakistan
- In office 21 November 2014 – 28 July 2017
- Prime Minister: Nawaz Sharif

Personal details
- Born: Musadik Masood Malik Lahore, Punjab, Pakistan
- Party: PMLN (2013-present)
- Education: University of Punjab (BS in Pharm.); University of Illinois (MBA, MS, PhD)
- Occupation: Politician, healthcare executive

Musadik Masood Malik is a Pakistani politician, re-elected to the Senate of Pakistan on 2 April 2024. He currently serves in Prime Minister Shahbaz Sharif’s administration as the Minister for Climate Change since May 2025. Malik previously held the positions of Minister of Water and Power during the Khoso caretaker ministry in 2013 and the Minister for Water Resources and Minister of Energy in the Sharif government.

== Academic career ==
Dr. Malik completed his postdoctoral fellowship in Health Economics and Medical Decision Making at the University of Illinois College of Medicine. He holds a Ph.D. and M.S. in Healthcare Administration and Policy, as well as an Master of Business Administration, from the University of Illinois. He has been adjunct professor of Strategy at King Saud University in Saudi Arabia and was also part of the faculty of the National School of Public Policy (NSPP) in Lahore.

== Professional career ==
In addition to his academic work, he has worked as an advisor to private sector organizations, including Fortune 500 companies. He has also served as an advisor to governments in oil-rich Middle Eastern countries, including Saudi Arabia, Bahrain and Oman, on issues related to economics, education, and healthcare. Beyond the Middle East region, he has worked with the Puerto Rico government.

== Political career ==
=== Early career ===
Malik began his political career when he joined Pervez Musharraf's National Commission for Human Development (NCHD), under Nasim Ashraf.

Malik was inducted into the federal cabinet of caretaker Prime Minister Mir Hazar Khan Khoso on 3 April 2013 and was appointed as Federal Minister for Water and Power where he served until 4 June 2013.

=== Pakistan Muslim League (N) ===
In November 2014, Malik was appointed as spokesperson for Prime Minister Nawaz Sharif.

In August 2017, he was appointed as Special Assistant to Prime Minister Shahid Khaqan Abbasi on Media Affairs.

He was nominated by Pakistan Muslim League (N) (PML-N) as its candidate in the 2018 Pakistani Senate election. However the Election Commission of Pakistan declared all PML-N candidates for the Senate election as independent after a ruling of the Supreme Court of Pakistan.

Malik was elected to the Senate of Pakistan as an independent candidate on general seat from Punjab in Senate election. He was backed in the election by PML-N and joined the treasury benches, led by PML-N after getting elected. He took oath as Senator on 12 March 2018. He was reelected as a senator representing a technocrat seat from Punjab on 2 April 2024, securing 121 votes.

In April 2018, he was given the status of federal minister in the cabinet of Prime Minister Shahid Khaqan Abbasi.
