= Ministry of Poverty Alleviation and Social Safety (Pakistan) =

Division of the Government of Pakistan

Poverty Alleviation and Social Safety Division

Agency overview
- Formed: 2020; 6 years ago
- Jurisdiction: Government of Pakistan
- Headquarters: Islamabad, Pakistan
- Minister responsible: Syed Imran Ahmed Shah, Federal Minister for Poverty Alleviation and Social Safety
- Parent department: Cabinet Secretariat
- Website: https://www.pass.gov.pk/

The Poverty Alleviation and Social Safety Division is a ministry in Pakistan that was established in 2020. It's responsible for formulating and implementing policies and programs aimed at reducing poverty, improving social safety nets, and providing assistance to vulnerable segments of society.

== History ==
The division's primary focus lies in poverty reduction and the implementation of social safety net programs, with the Ehsaas Programme standing out as its flagship initiative. The Ehsaas Program is a comprehensive poverty reduction endeavor encompassing a spectrum of interventions, ranging from cash transfers to educational and healthcare initiatives, as well as livelihood support programs.

In addition to the Ehsaas Program, the division oversees several other notable initiatives, including the Benazir Income Support Program (BISP), the Waseela-e-Taleem Program (WeT), the Waseela-e-Sehat Program (WeS), and the Kafalat Program. These programs aim to provide financial assistance to low-income households, enhance access to education and healthcare services, and offer support to vulnerable segments of society such as the elderly and disabled.

The Poverty Alleviation and Social Safety Division collaborates closely with provincial governments, civil society organizations, and international development partners to implement poverty reduction initiatives throughout Pakistan.
