= Privatisation Commission (Pakistan) =

Pakistani government agency

Pakistan Privatisation Commission
- Type: Government body
- Legal status: Active
- Purpose: Privatisation of federal government assets
- Headquarters: Islamabad, Pakistan
- Region served: Pakistan
- Chairman: Mohammad Saleem (2023)
- Parent organization: Ministry of Privatization

The Pakistan Privatisation Commission, operating under the Ministry of Privatisation (Pakistan), is a government agency based in Islamabad responsible for executing the country's privatisation initiatives. Its primary role is to ensure open and transparent divestment of federal government assets, including stakes in banks, industrial units, oil and gas companies, transport enterprises, and infrastructure service providers.

The Commission is overseen by a Board, which includes the Minister for Privatisation. Muhammad Salim currently serves as the Chairman of the Privatisation Commission.

== Activities ==
The Privatisation Commission has been actively involved in several major transactions:

Pakistan International Airlines (PIA): PIA's finances are likely to be handed over to the Privatisation Commission in an effort to bring transparency. The Cabinet Committee on Privatisation (CCoP) decided to include PIA in the list of active privatisation projects.

Services International Hotel (SIH): The CCoP allowed the Privatisation Commission to move towards a successful conclusion of the SIH transaction with the completion of the transfer/mutation process in the name of the buyer.

K-Electric: Privatisation Commission officials have reported that K-Electric has become a profitable company that was privatised for Rs 15 billion.

FBR Land: The Privatisation Commission handed over the mutation deed of FBR land in Faisalabad to the successful buyer.
