= National Security Division =

National Security Division may refer to:

- National Security Division (Malaysia), a Malaysian government agency
- United States Department of Justice National Security Division, a United States federal government agency
