= Ministry of Privatisation (Pakistan) =

Government ministry of Pakistan

- وزارتِ نجکاری

Agency overview
- Formed: August 4, 2017; 9 years ago
- Jurisdiction: Government of Pakistan
- Headquarters: Islamabad, Islamabad Capital Territory
- Minister responsible: Aleem Khan
- Agency executives: Rizwan Malik, Secretary Privatization; Muhammad Bashir Khan, Federal Parliamentary Secretary for Privatization
- Website: privatisation.gov.pk

The Ministry of Privatisation (Urdu: وزارتِ نجکاری) is a Pakistan Government's federal and executive level ministry created on 4 August 2017 by Shahid Khaqan Abbasi. The ministry was created by separating the privatisation division from the Ministry of Finance, Revenue, Economic Affairs, Statistics and Privatisation (now Ministry of Finance, Revenue and Economic Affairs).

== List of ministers ==
No.	Portrait	Name (Born–Died)	Tenure			Party	Government	Prime Minister
No.	Portrait	Name (Born–Died)	From	To	Length	Party	Government	Prime Minister
1		Daniyal Aziz (born 1965); MNA for 116 Narowal-II	10 August 2017	31 May 2018	294 days	Pakistan Muslim League (N)	Abbasi	Shahid Khaqan Abbasi
C		Shamshad Akhtar (since 1954)	5 June 2018	18 August 2018	74 days	Independent	Mulk (Caretaker)	Nasirul Mulk
2		Muhammad Mian Soomro (born 1950); MNA for 196 Jacobabad	5 October 2018	10 April 2022	3 years, 187 days	Pakistan Tehreek-e-Insaf	Khan	Imran Khan
3		Abid Hussain Bhayo; MNA for 198 Shikarpur-I	19 April 2022	9 August 2023	1 year, 112 days	Pakistan People's Party	Shehbaz I	Shehbaz Sharif
C		Shamshad Akhtar (since 1954)	17 August 2023	15 September 2023	29 days	Independent	Kakar (Caretaker)	Anwaar ul Haq Kakar
C		Fawad Hasan Fawad	16 September 2023	4 March 2024	170 days	Independent	Kakar (Caretaker)	Anwaar ul Haq Kakar
4		Aleem Khan (born 1970); MNA for NA-117 Lahore-II	11 March 2024	Incumbent	2 years, 154 days	Istehkam-e-Pakistan Party	Shehbaz II	Shehbaz Sharif

== Departments ==
- Pakistan Privatization Commission
