= Ahmad Irfan Aslam =

Pakistani political expert

Caretaker Federal Minister for Law and Justice, Climate Change and Water Resources, Pakistan
- In office 18 August 2023 – 4 March 2024
- Succeeded by: Azam Nazeer Tarar (Law and Justice)

Caretaker Federal Minister for Water Resources, Pakistan
- In office August 18, 2023 – March 4, 2024

Minister for Climate Change and Environmental Coordination, Pakistan
- In office August 18, 2023 – March 4, 2024

Ahmed Irfan Aslam (Urdu: احمد عرفان اسلم) is a Pakistani political expert who served as the Caretaker Federal Minister for Law and Justice and Caretaker Federal Minister for Water Resources from 18 August 2023 to 4 March 2024 in the Kakar caretaker ministry.

== Career ==
On 18 August 2023, Ahmed Irfan Aslam became Caretaker Federal Minister for Law and Justice, as well as Caretaker Federal Minister for Water Resources. He chaired several meetings, including a meeting to review progress on the Diamer-Bhasha Dam and a meeting with the President of the International Association for Hydro-Environment Engineering and Research (IAHR) on water-related issues.

Aslam served as the Minister for Climate Change and Environment Coordination from 18 August 2023.
