= Mohammed Sadiq (diplomat) =

Pakistani diplomat

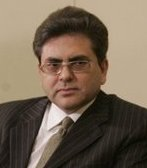
Mohammad Sadiq

Mohammed Sadiq is a retired Pakistani diplomat (active 1990s–2023).

Mohammad Sadiq was born in Zaida, District Swabi and spent his early childhood in Kunri in Sindh where his father Mohammad Salim was running several businesses.

Currently Ambassador Sadiq is a Special Assistant to Prime Minister/Minister of State and Pakistan's Special Representative for Afghanistan. He is also the Chairman/CEO of Sadiq Group of Enterprises and a member of BOG of Institute of Strategic Studies Islamabad.

He earlier served as Secretary National Security Division, Ambassador to Afghanistan, Spokesman of Foreign Office and several other diplomatic assignments to US, EU and China.

As Deputy Ambassador to the United States, Mr. Sadiq launched the first ever internship program by Government of Pakistan and conducted a comprehensive demographic study of the Pakistani American community and worked with the Pakistani American community to establish the Pakistan Caucus at Capitol Hill.

He retired in 2023.

Education
M.A.	Political Science	Peshawar University
Master of International Affairs		Columbia University New York
M.S.	Defence and Security Studies	National Defence University, Islamabad
