= 2025–26 Pakistan federal budget =

Pakistan federal budget

2025—26 Pakistan federal budget
- Submitted by: Muhammad Aurangzeb
- Submitted to: National Assembly of Pakistan
- Presented: 10 June 2025
- Passed: 26 June 2025
- Country: Pakistan
- Party: PML-N
- Website: Finance Bill2025—26

The 2025–26 Pakistan federal budget is the federal budget of Pakistan for the fiscal year beginning on 1 July 2025 and ending on 30 June 2026.

On 10 June 2025, Finance Minister Muhammad Aurangzeb presented the federal budget with a total outlay of Rs 17.573 trillion.

On 26 June 2025, the National Assembly of Pakistan passed the federal budget.

On 27 June 2025, President Asif Ali Zardari gave his assent to the Finance Act 2025. On 29 June 2025, the bill was notified in the Gazette of Pakistan.

== See also ==
- Economy of Pakistan
- Federal budget of Pakistan
- Taxation in Pakistan
