= Ahad Cheema =

Pakistani bureaucrat

Ministry of Economic Affairs (Pakistan)
- Incumbent
- Assumed office 11 March 2024
- President: Asif Ali Zardari
- Prime Minister: Shehbaz Sharif

Member of Senate of Pakistan
- Incumbent
- Assumed office 9 April 2024
- Constituency: Punjab

Advisor to PM in Establishment Division
- Incumbent
- Assumed office 9 March 2024
- President: Asif Ali Zardari
- Prime Minister: Shehbaz Sharif
- Army Chief: Asim Munir

Personal details
- Born: Hafizabad, Punjab, Pakistan
- Party: PMLN (2022-present)

Ahad Khan Cheema is a retired Pakistani bureaucrat who is the current Federal Minister of Economic Affairs, appointed on 11 March 2024.

Previously, he has served as a chief executive officer (CEO) of the Quaid-e-Azam Thermal Power Company and director-general of the Lahore Development Authority. In 2018, the National Accountability Bureau (NAB) arrested Cheema on charges related to irregularities in the Ashiana Housing Scheme project during his time as chairman of the LDA. The investigation also involved former Prime Minister Nawaz Sharif's principal secretary Fawad Hassan Fawad and Shehbaz Sharif. Cheema was released on bail in 2021 after spending three years in jail and was acquitted of all charges by the NAB in 2023. He took retirement from civil service in January 2023.

== Early life and education ==
Ahad Cheema was born into a Punjabi Jat family of the Cheema clan in Hafizabad, Punjab, Pakistan to an agricultural family.

He studied Economic and Political Science at the University of the Punjab and later the London School of Economics.

After completing his education, he joined Pakistan Administrative Service (PAS) in 2001.

== Professional career ==
Cheema has served in executive positions as chief executive officer (CEO), director or board member of companies such as Pakistan Telecommunication Co. Ltd, Pak Arab Refinery Ltd and Quaid-e-Azam Thermal Power (Pvt) Ltd.

== Administration career ==
=== Under Pervaiz Elahi ===
In 2005, Cheema was selected by Chief Minister Pervaiz Elahi to manage the Parah Likha Punjab project, a World Bank-supported initiative aimed at increasing literacy in Punjab.

=== Under Shehbaz Sharif ===
Cheema has been part of Shehbaz Sharif's ministry since 2008, when Sharif first became the Chief Minister of Punjab. During Sharif's tenure as Chief Minister, Cheema served as the Deputy Commissioner of Lahore as well as the Director General of the Lahore Development Authority (LDA).

In 2012, Cheema was chosen by the chief minister to oversee and monitor the Lahore Metro Bus System (MBS) project. As the director general of the LDA from March 2012, Cheema completed the project in a record time of 11 months. In recognition of his outstanding services in constructing the Lahore metro, he received the Tamgha-e-Imtiaz from the President of Pakistan. Later, due to this project, he became known in bureaucratic circles as the "metro man".

== Political career ==
=== Advisor to the Prime Minister ===
In 2023, Cheema was appointed as the Advisor to the Prime Minister on Establishment Division following Shehbaz Sharif's appointment as Prime Minister of Pakistan. He continued to serve in this role during the caretaker government after Sharif's term ended in the Kakar caretaker ministry. However, the Election Commission of Pakistan ordered the caretaker government to remove Cheema from the caretaker cabinet following a petition filed against him. The President of Pakistan approved his removal in December 2023.

=== Federal Minister of Economic Affairs ===
On 11 March 2024, Cheema assumed the role of Federal Minister of Economic Affairs within the cabinet led by Prime Minister Shehbaz Sharif. Notably, Cheema was appointed to the federal cabinet prior to being elected as a member of parliament.

== Controversies ==
=== Ashiana Housing Scheme ===
In 2018, the National Accountability Bureau (NAB) arrested Cheema on charges related to irregularities in the Ashiana Housing Scheme project during his time as chairman of the LDA. The investigation also involved former Prime Minister Nawaz Sharif's principal secretary Fawad Hassan Fawad and Shehbaz Sharif. Cheema was released on bail in 2021 after spending three years in jail and was acquitted of all charges by the NAB in 2023. He took retirement from civil service in January 2023.

=== Aitchison Principal's Resignation ===
On March 25, 2024, Michael A. Thompson, the Australian principal of Aitchison College, resigned, citing interference by the Governor's House in college administration. Reports suggest his resignation was influenced by a dispute over fee waivers, involving Punjab Governor Balighur Rehman granting leave and a three-year fee waiver to the sons of Cheema.

In June 2022, Cheema's wife, a civil servant, requested a fee waiver for their sons due to her transfer to Islamabad. She sought a leave of absence, but the principal denied the fee waiver, citing policy. Governor Rehman intervened on March 21, 2024, granting the sons a leave of absence with a full fee waiver, sparking the principal's resignation and raising concerns about political interference in the college's administration.
