= Romina Khurshid Alam =

Pakistani politician

Member of the National Assembly of Pakistan
- Incumbent
- Assumed office 4 April 2024
- In office 13 August 2018 – 10 August 2023
- Constituency: Reserved seat for women
- In office 3 June 2013 – 31 May 2018
- Constituency: Reserved seat for women

Personal details
- Born: July 18, 1976 (age 50) Gujranwala, Punjab, Pakistan
- Party: PMLN (2013-present)

Romina Khurshid Alam (Urdu: رومینہ خورشید عالم; born 18 July 1976) is a Pakistani politician from the city of Gujranwala. She was elected to the National Assembly of Pakistan as a candidate of Pakistan Muslim League (N) (PML-N) on reserved seats for women from Punjab in 2013 Pakistani general election.

== Early life ==
She was born on 18 July 1976 in Gujranwala.

She was born Christian but embraced Islam at an age of 43 years. She converted and announced through her official Twitter account on Eid ul Adha of 2020.

== Career and achievements ==
She was elected to the National Assembly of Pakistan as a candidate of Pakistan Muslim League (N) (PML-N) on reserved seats for women from Punjab in the 2013 Pakistani general election.

She was re-elected to the National Assembly as a candidate of PML-N on a seat reserved for women from Punjab in the 2018 Pakistani general election.
