= Ministry of Law and Justice (Pakistan) =

Ministry of the Government of Pakistan

- وزارت قانون و انصاف
- Emblem of Pakistan

Agency overview
- Jurisdiction: Government of Pakistan
- Headquarters: Pakistan Secretariat, Presidency Road, Islamabad 33°44′01.5″N 73°05′47.2″E
- Minister responsible: Azam Nazeer Tarar, Law Minister of Pakistan
- Agency executive: Law Secretary of Pakistan
- Website: www.molaw.gov.pk

The Ministry of Justice (Urdu: وزارتِ قانون و انصاف); abbreviated as MoJ) is a cabinet-level ministry of Pakistan, responsible for the enforcement of law and administration of justice.

The ministry's political executive figure is known as the Minister for Law, Justice and Human Rights, who must be an elected legislator and Parliamentarian. The Minister for Justice is associated with enforcing laws and administration of government judicial departments, and is a public face of the government in legal services required by the state. The ministry's administration is headed by the Law Secretary of Pakistan. The ministry is also represented by the Attorney General as the chief law enforcement officer of the federal government, representing it in civilian Supreme Court cases, and assisting the Minister for Justice and the government in legal cases. Both the Minister for Justice and Attorney General are nominated by the Prime Minister of Pakistan, and are members of the Cabinet. It is currently headed by Ahmed Irfan Aslam as of 17 August 2023.

== Departments ==
=== Competition Appellate Tribunal ===
Appellate Tribunal established in 2010 to hear appeals decision by Competition Commission of Pakistan

=== Anti Dumping Appellate Tribunal ===
Appellate Tribunal established in 2000 to redress the issues relating to imposition of anti-dumping duties by National Tariff Commission, to offset injurious dumping in the public interest.

=== Accountability Courts ===
Courts established to hear cases of National Accountability Bureau.
