= Ministry of National Food Security & Research =

Government ministry of Pakistan

- وزارتِ برائے قومی تحقیق و حفظانِ تغذیہ ، پاکستان

Agency overview
- Jurisdiction: Government of Pakistan
- Headquarters: Islamabad, Islamabad Capital Territory
- Minister responsible: Altaf Hussain (Pakistani politician), Federal Minister For National Food Security & Research
- Agency executive: Zafar Hassan, Federal Secretary for National Food Security & Research
- Website: www.mnfsr.gov.pk

The Ministry of National Food Security & Research or Ministry of Agricultulre (Urdu: وزارتِ برائے قومی تحقیق و حفظانِ تغذیہ ، پاکستان, wazarat-e- baraye qaumi tehqeeq o hfzanِ taghzia, Pakistan (abbreviated as MoA) is a Cabinet-level ministerial department of Government of Pakistan. It is responsible for implementing, enforcing, developing, and executing policies on agriculture, rice, livestock, fishing, and farming. The ministry is governed by the Minister of National Food Security and Research, who must be a member of Parliament of Pakistan. According to the World Food Programme (WFP), "36.9% of [Pakistan's] population faces food security. This is due to limited economic access by the poorest and most vulnerable group of the population – particularly women – to an adequate and diverse diet."

== Attached departments ==
=== Agricultural Policy Institute ===
Agriculture Prices Commission was established in 1981 and re-constituted as Agriculture Policy Institute (API) in 2006 as attached department with ministry.

=== Federal Seed Certification & Registration Department ===
Provide seed certification and quality control cover for various crops and field inspection of the crops of registered varieties and released varieties.

=== Animal Quarantine Department ===
Regulate the import, export and quarantine of animals and animal products, in order to prevent the introduction or spread of exotic diseases and maintain quarantine services of high standards, to protect the livestock industry of Pakistan and other countries.

=== National Veterinary Laboratory ===
National Veterinary Laboratory is a national institution for service and regulatory support to national livestock wealth. These laboratories are capable of catering needs in advanced applied biotechnology, bacteriology, virology, analytical chemistry, biochemistry, immunology, molecular biology, toxicology, pathology, parasitology and exotic diseases.

=== Department of Plant Protection ===
The department Quarantines and routinely locust Survey and control.

== Autonomous bodies ==
=== Pakistan Agricultural Research Council ===
Pakistan Agricultural Research Council (PARC) is the apex national organization working in close collaboration with other federal provincial institutions in the country to provide science-based solutions to agriculture of Pakistan. The organization promote and coordinate agricultural research, arrange expeditious utilization of research results and establish research establishments to fill in the gaps in existing agricultural research system.

== Corporations ==
=== Pakistan Agriculture Storage and Services Corporation ===
PASSCO is a public Limited Company, its functions include maintaining strategic reserves of wheat and other specified commodities and procurement of food commodities at Government’s fix price.

== Boards ==
=== Pakistan Oilseed Development Board ===
Pakistan Oil-seed Development Board (PODB) was established in 1995 to enhance indigenous oil-seed production. PODB serves as an important national institution for the development of oilseed sector in the country, besides providing regulatory and policy framework to this sector.

=== Livestock and Dairy Development Board ===
Plan, promote, facilitate and coordinate livestock, poultry and dairy sectors development of Pakistan.

=== Fisheries Development Board ===
Fisheries Development Board is set up to provide and maintain a platform for enhancing and promoting fisheries sector in Pakistan. The board Coordinates with national and provincial activities with relation to aquaculture and shrimp farming and development of market infrastructure and improvement of marketing of fisheries products

== Companies ==
=== Pakistan Dairy Development Company ===
Pakistan Dairy Development Company (PDDC or Dairy Pakistan) has been established to drive the development of the Pakistan dairy sector. Dairy Pakistan is a Public-Private sector joint initiative to bring about structural long term change in the dairy industry in Pakistan. Dairy Pakistan is chartered to coordinate, manage and facilitate initiatives leading to the development of the dairy sector in the country.

== Cell ==
=== Federal Water Management Cell ===
Federal Water Management Cell serves as an arm of the Ministry to deal with all the matters related to irrigation water management and agriculture mechanization.

== See also ==
- Agriculture in Pakistan
