= Establishment Division =

Division of the Government of Pakistan

- تقسیم قیام

Agency overview
- Headquarters: Islamabad, Islamabad Capital Territory
- Ministers responsible: Shehbaz Sharif, Prime Minister of Pakistan; Ahad Cheema, Advisor to the Prime Minister (with status of a Federal Minister)
- Agency executive: Establishment Secretary of Pakistan
- Website: establishment.gov.pk

The Establishment Division is the human resource arm of the Government of Pakistan. It deals with all matters related to the country's civil service and is regarded as one of the most sensitive and important divisions of the federal government. The division operates directly under the Prime Minister of Pakistan as the Minister In-charge. The Establishment Division, headed by the Federal Establishment Secretary, has a key role in recommending to the Prime Minister the right man for the right job in all government ministries, divisions and departments. According to the Civil Service Manual, the Establishment Secretary has the authority to single-handedly appoint or transfer officers up to Grade 20. A summary to the Prime Minister is sent only for grades 21 and 22 who being the competent authority, sends back the summary to the Establishment Division, where the Secretary issues the notification.

The Establishment Secretary reports to the Prime Minister and is assisted by two Additional Secretaries of grade 21. Under them are seven Joint Secretaries of grade 20. Foremost amidst these candidacies is the Joint Secretary of E-Wing. This influential office is immune from interventions by Additional Secretaries and works subordinated to the office of the Secretary.
