= Ministry of Housing and Works (Pakistan) =

Government ministry of Pakistan

- وزارتِ اقامت کاری

Agency overview
- Formed: 14 August 1947; 79 years ago
- Jurisdiction: Government of Pakistan
- Headquarters: Islamabad, Islamabad Capital Territory
- Minister responsible: Riaz Hussain Pirzada
- Agency executives: Dr. Imran Zeb Khan, Secretary (Housing and Works)
- Website: mohw.gov.pk

The Ministry of Housing and Works (Urdu: وزارتِ عمل و اقامت کاری, wazarat-e- amal o Iqamat kaari ) is a cabinet level ministry of the Government of Pakistan headed by the Minister for Housing and Works, who must be an elected member of the Parliament of Pakistan. The administrative head of the ministry is the Federal Secretary for Housing.

The Ministry is responsible for acquisition and development of sites as well as construction and maintenance of Federal Government buildings. It is actively involved in the coordination of civil works, budget, fixation and recovery of rents from Government owned / hired and requisitioned buildings.

== Autonomous bodies ==
The Ministry has the following three autonomous bodies:

=== Pakistan Housing Authority ===
PHA Foundation provides low cost housing units to low and middle income groups of Pakistan on ownership basis. Established in 1999, PHAF has built several housing units for general public and Federal Government Employees at prime locations of Federal and Provincial Capitals.

=== Federal Government Employees Housing Authority ===
Federal Government Employees Housing Foundation was set up in March 1990 under the Companies Ordinance 1984. It was tasked with implementation the self-financing housing schemes on ownership basis for Federal Government employees. Within a span of five years, about 16000 houses were constructed under the said scheme in Islamabad and about 4000 plots were allotted to the successful applicants with an option to undertake construction under their own arrangements.

== Attached departments ==
The Ministry has the following three attached departments.

=== Pakistan Public Works Department ===
The objective of Pakistan Public Works Department is to execute the offices and residential accommodation for federal Government employee and to overcome the backlog of millions of square foot of office space and housing units being presently accommodated in hired office space and privately owned residences within budgetary provisions of Federal Government.

=== Estate Office Management ===
The Estate Office provides government-owned office accommodation to the Federal Ministries and their departments, allots government-owned residential accommodation to Federal and State Ministers and their employees and manages commercial units.

== See also ==
- Economy of Pakistan
