= Ministry of Federal Education and Professional Training =

Ministry of the Government of Pakistan

Ministry of Federal Education and Professional Training وفاقی وزارتِ برائے تعلیم و پیشہ وارانہ تربیت

Agency overview
- Formed: July 1, 2011; 15 years ago (In its current form); 14 August 1947
- Jurisdiction: Federal government of Pakistan
- Headquarters: Block C in Pakistan Secretariat, Red Zone in Islamabad, Pakistan
- Annual budget: FY25-26 federal budget
- Federal Minister responsible: Dr. K. M. Siddiqui, (Minister of Education)
- State Minister responsible: Wajiha Qamar, (Minister of State)
- Agency executive: Nadeem Mahbub, Education Secretary
- Key document: XVIII Amendment in 2010
- Website: www.mofept.gov.pk/index

The Ministry of Federal Education and Professional Training (Urdu: وفاقی وزارتِ برائے تعلیم و پیشہ وارانہ تربیت) is a cabinet-level executive ministry of the federal Government of Pakistan. The ministry's political head is known as the Minister of Pakistan and the ministry's bureaucratic head is the Education Secretary of Pakistan.

Education is primarily provincial issue in Pakistan in the wake of 18th Amendment to the Constitution of Pakistan when Education department was transferred from federal to provinces. The Ministry was established in July 2011. In 2013, it was renamed to Ministry of Education, Trainings & Standards in Higher Education and in 2014 was renamed to Ministry of Federal Education and Professional Training.

The department’s main responsibilities include creating policies, plans and programs to ensure the accessibility and availability of education in Pakistan. It is also a provider of many technical, vocational and professional skills and training that are needed to satisfy the national and international standards of the employment market. It works in collaboration with other ministries and organizations by sponsoring students, distributing scholarships and conducting multiple training sessions.

== Organisations ==
=== Higher Education Commission ===
The Higher Education Commission (HEC) is an autonomous institution of primary funding, overseeing, regulating and accrediting the higher education efforts in Pakistan.

=== Academy of Educational Planning and Management ===
The Academy of Educational Planning and Management (AEPAM) was established in 1982 as an autonomous Organization of Ministry of Education and it was declared as 'Subordinate Office' of Ministry of Education in 2005. After 18th Amendment Bill 2011 AEPAM is 'Subordinate Office' of Ministry of Federal Education and Professional Training.

AEPAM is a training institution for education managers in the field of financial and administrative management of secondary schools and higher secondary schools.

=== Basic Education Community Schools ===
The BEC Schools are based on Non-Formal basic education system having a single home based room for school for primary education where the premises is provided free of cost by the community. In each BEC School, 30 learners of age group 4–16 years are mandatory. Single teacher is responsible for classes of a school by adopting multi-grade teaching methods; based on concurrent curriculum.

=== National Commission for Human Development ===
National Commission for Human Development is an attached department whose mission is to improve access to basic education and healthcare in the country’s poorest communities. NCHD is working in 134 districts of Pakistan.

=== National Education Assessment System ===
National Education Assessment System (NEAS) was launched in 2003 to develop national capacity for monitoring learning achievements of elementary students and improve the quality of services — curriculum, textual material, teacher's delivery, policy formulation.

The system is a key program of the Education Sector Reforms (ESR) and is funded by the World Bank.

=== National Education Foundation ===
National Education Foundation was founded in late 1994 and became operational in 1996. In 1997 Federal Teacher Foundation (FTF) was also merged with it. It was restructured as corporate in 2002. It has mandate to promote basic education through Public Private Partnership in FATA, Gilgit-Baltistan, AJK & Islamabad Capital Territory.

=== National Talent Pool ===
National Talent Pool is an initiative of Government of Pakistan with a mandate to identify key professionals’ occupations according to scarcity and relative importance for national development. The NTP was established in the Ministry to compile basic personal data and details regarding professional attainments and work experience of talented personnel.

=== National Training Bureau ===
National Training Bureau (NTB) was established in 1976. It is an attached department of Ministry of Federal Education and Professional Training. The National Training Bureau (NTB) has the mandate to assess existing and future training needs, develop training syllabi, specifying training standards and conduct trade testing. Since its inception, keeping in view the local & foreign labor market needs, National Training Bureau has implemented & completed different training projects on vocational training.

=== Federal Board of Intermediate and Secondary Education ===
Federal Board of Intermediate and Secondary Education, Islamabad is the Intermediate and secondary Education Government board in Pakistan for educational institutes in Islamabad Capital Territory, Gilgit–Baltistan, AJK and for Pakistan International Schools abroad.

== See also ==
- Education in Pakistan
