= Ministry of Information & Broadcasting (Pakistan) =

Ministry of the Government of Pakistan

Agency overview
- Formed: August 14, 1947; 79 years ago
- Type: Ministry
- Jurisdiction: Government of Pakistan
- Headquarters: Islamabad, Islamabad Capital Territory
- Minister responsible: Attaullah Tarar, Federal Minister for Information and Broadcasting
- Agency executive: Ambreen Jan, Information Secretary of Pakistan
- Website: Official Website

The Ministry of Information & Broadcasting (Urdu: وزارت اطلاعات و نشریات, romanized: vizārat-e-ittilā'āt va naśriyyāt)(abbreviated as MoIB) is a Cabinet-level ministry of Government of Pakistan, responsible to release government information, media galleries, public domain and government unclassified non-scientific data to the public and international communities. The MoIB has jurisdiction for administrating the rules and regulations and laws relating to information, broadcasting and the press media in Pakistan.

== Autonomous/semi-autonomous bodies ==
=== Shalimar Recording & Broadcasting Company Ltd ===
Shalimar Recording & Broadcasting Company Ltd. (SRBC), is an unlisted public limited Company, incorporated in 1974. Currently it is a recording and broadcasting company with 20 ATV stations in the urban centers of Pakistan.

It was originally perceived and formed as a recording company in 1974 with an objective to protect the interest of the Artists, poets, composers and others who were being deprived of their legitimate earnings and with the aim to release the recordings on cassettes and other mediums, which were in the national interest but not viable from the commercial point of view. It started the business with recording and manufacturing of the gramophone records in 1976.

=== Press Council of Pakistan ===
The Press Council of Pakistan is an autonomous and independent apex body which issue and monitor good standards of media practice.

== Corporations ==
=== Associated Press of Pakistan ===
Associated Press of Pakistan (APP) is a government-operated national news agency of Pakistan. It is not associated with the Associated Press agency (AP).

=== Pakistan Broadcasting Corporation ===
Pakistan Broadcasting Corporation also known as Radio Pakistan provides broadcasting services for general reception in all parts of Pakistan through Home and External Services for the purposes of disseminating information‚ education and entertainment through programmes.

=== Pakistan Television Corporation ===
Pakistan Television Corporation (PTV) is a public and commercial broadcasting television network.

== Attached Departments ==
=== Press Information Department ===
Press Information Department is the principal department of Ministry of Information & Broadcasting headed by Principal Information Officer (PIO). PID is working since 1947 with the mission to establish an authentic source for timely dissemination of information to people through all forms of media.

=== Information Service Academy ===
Information Service Academy is civil service academy for specialized Training to Information Group Officers of civil service of Pakistan.

== Regulator ==
=== Pakistan Electronic Media Regulatory Authority ===
PEMRA was established in 2002 to facilitate and regulate the private electronic media. It has mandate to improve the standards of information, education and entertainment and to enlarge the choice available to the people of Pakistan Including news, current affairs, religious knowledge, art and culture as well as science and technology.

== Other Offices ==
=== Nazriya Pakistan Council Trust ===
Nazriya Pakistan Council (NPC) is a trust and a non commercial organization. Its advisory body is a board of trustees comprising eminent personalities of the country. NPC is also managing the affairs of the Aiwan-i-Quaid an institution which provides a platform to organize seminars, symposia and conferences on important issues regarding Pakistan and Islamic ideology in order to achieve the NPC objectives.

== See also ==
- Government of Pakistan
- PEMRA
- Urdu Science Board
