= Ministry of Overseas Pakistanis and Human Resource Development =

Government ministry of Pakistan

- وزارت بیرون ملک پاکستانی و ترقی انسانی وسائل

Agency overview
- Formed: 2013; 13 years ago
- Jurisdiction: Government of Pakistan
- Headquarters: Islamabad, Islamabad Capital Territory
- Minister responsible: Aun Chaudhry
- Deputy Minister responsible: Muhmad Salmann
- Agency executive: Engr. Aamir Hasan, Federal Secretary
- Website: ophrd.gov.pk

The Ministry of Overseas Pakistanis and Human Resource Development (Urdu: وزارت بیرون ملک پاکستانی و ترقی انسانی وسائل), abbreviated as MOPHRD) is a ministry of the Government of Pakistan that oversees matters concerning Overseas Pakistanis and human resource development in Pakistan.

The ministry was established in July 2013 through the merger of the Ministry of Overseas Pakistanis and the Ministry of Human Resource Development.
