= Ministry of Parliamentary Affairs (Pakistan) =

Government ministry of Pakistan

- وزارت پارلیمانی امور

Agency overview
- Formed: 1 April 2012; 14 years ago
- Jurisdiction: Government of Pakistan
- Headquarters: Islamabad,
- Minister responsible: Tariq Fazal Chaudhry
- Agency executive: Abdul Malik Ghauri, Secretary Parliamentary Affairs
- Website: www.mopa.gov.pk

The Ministry of Parliamentary Affairs Urdu: وزارت پارلیمانی امور, wazarat-e- parlimani umoor (abbreviated as MoPA) is a ministry of the Government of Pakistan.

It is tasked with handling affairs relating to the Parliament of Pakistan, and works as a link between the two chambers, the National Assembly (the lower house) and the Senate (the upper house).

== See also ==
- Parliament of Pakistan
- National Assembly of Pakistan
- Senate of Pakistan
- Federal Government Ministries of Pakistan
