= Ministry of Industries and Production =

Ministry of the Government of Pakistan

- وزارتِ صنعت و پیداوار، پاکستان

Agency overview
- Formed: 14 August 1947; 79 years ago
- Jurisdiction: Government of Pakistan
- Headquarters: Block A, Pak Secretariat Islamabad, ICT, Pakistan. 44000.
- Minister responsible: Rana Tanveer Hussain
- Agency executive: Waseem Ajmal, Pakistan Secretary of Industries and Production
- Website: moip.gov.pk

The Ministry of Industries and Production (Urdu: وزارتِ صنعت و پیداوار، پاکستان) is headed by the Minister for Industries and Production and Pakistan Secretary of Industries and Production.

== National Fertilizer Corporation of Pakistan ==
National Fertilizer Corporation of Pakistan (NFC) was established in August 1973. It is under the administrative control of the Ministry of Industries and Production (Pakistan).

== Pakistan Industrial Development Corporation ==
Pakistan Industrial Development Corporation (PIDC) is a state corporation of Pakistan under Ministry of Industries and Production. It was created to set up industries in Pakistan in such fields where the private sector was shy and where large amount of capital outlay with long gestation period was required.

=== Subsidiary Companies ===
- National Industrial Parks Development and Management Company
- Technology Up-Gradation and Skills Development Company
- Karachi Tools, Dies And Moulds Centre
- Pakistan Stone Development Company
- Pakistan Gems & Jewellery Development Company
- Pakistan Hunting & Sporting Arms Development Company
- Furniture Pakistan Company
- Southern Punjab Embroidery Industry
- Aik Hunar Aik Nagar
- Pakistan Chemical And Energy Sector Skills Development

== Small and Medium Enterprises Development Authority ==
Small and Medium Enterprises Development Authority is an autonomous institution of the Government of Pakistan under Ministry of Industries and Production. SMEDA was established in October 1998 for encouraging and facilitating the development and growth of small and medium enterprises in the country.

== Utility Stores Corporation ==
Utility Stores Corporation of Pakistan is an organization that operates chain stores throughout Pakistan that provide basic commodities to general public at subsidized rates.

== See also ==
- Economy of Pakistan
- Ministry of Commerce (Pakistan)
