= Government of Pakistan =

- حکومتِ پاکستان; Hukūmat-e-Pākistān
- Federal government
- Government of Pakistan's Logo with the national emblem

Overview
- Established: 14 August 1947; 79 years ago (independence); 14 August 1973; 53 years ago (current form)
- Country: Islamic Republic of Pakistan
- Leader: Head of State: President of Pakistan; Head of Government: Prime Minister of Pakistan
- Leader Name: President: Asif Ali Zardari; Prime Minister: Shehbaz Sharif
- Appointed by: President: Electoral College; Prime Minister: National Assembly
- Main organ: Cabinet of Pakistan
- Ministries: 32 federal ministries with 39 divisions; 11 ministries of state (Note: The number of total ministries, whether federal or state, and divisions fluctuates with government reorganisation.)
- Responsible to: Parliament of Pakistan
- Annual budget: ₨ 17.5 trillion (≈US$62.5 billion) (As of 10 June 2025)
- Headquarters: Federal Secretariat, Islamabad
- Website: pakistan.gov.pk

The Government of Pakistan (Note: Urdu: حکومتِ پاکستان, romanised: hukūmat-e-pākistān) (constitutionally known as the Federal Government (Note: Urdu: وفاقی حکومت, romanised: vifāqī hukūmat) and commonly the Centre (Note: Urdu: مرکز, romanised: markaz)) is the national authority of the Islamic Republic of Pakistan, a federal parliamentary republic located in South Asia, consisting of four provinces and one federal territory. The territories of Gilgit-Baltistan and Azad Kashmir are also considered and administered as part of the country, but have separate systems and are not part of the federation. (Note: For further information, see Kashmir Conflict)

Under the Constitution, there are three primary branches of a government: the legislative, whose powers are vested in a bicameral Parliament; the executive, consisting of the president, aided by the Cabinet which is headed by the prime minister; and the judiciary, with the Supreme Court.

Effecting the Westminster system for governing the state, the government is mainly composed of the executive, legislative, and judicial branches, in which all powers are vested by the Constitution in the Parliament, the prime minister and the Supreme Court. The powers and duties of these branches are further defined by acts and amendments of the Parliament, including the creation of executive institutions, departments and courts inferior to the Supreme Court. By constitutional powers, the president promulgates ordinances and passes bills.

The president acts as the ceremonial figurehead while the people-elected prime minister acts as the chief executive (of the executive branch) and is responsible for running the federal government. There is a bicameral Parliament with the National Assembly as a Lower house and the Senate as an upper house. The most influential officials in the Government of Pakistan are considered to be the Federal Secretaries, who are the highest ranking bureaucrats in the country and run cabinet-level ministries and divisions. The judicial branch systematically contains an apex Supreme Court, Federal Shariat Court, High courts of five provinces, district, anti-terrorism, and the green courts; all inferior to the Supreme Court.

The full name of the country is the Islamic Republic of Pakistan. No other name appears in the Constitution, and this is the name that appears on money, in treaties, and in legal cases. The "Pakistan Government" or "Government of Pakistan" are often used in official documents representing the federal government collectively. Also, the terms "Federal" and "National" in government institutions or program names generally indicate affiliation with the federal government. As the seat of government is in Islamabad, "Islamabad" is commonly used as a metonym for the federal government.

== Federal law and Constitution ==
The Constitution of Pakistan established and constituted the federal government of four provinces of federation of nation-state, known as State of Pakistan. The Constitution reads as:

The Federal Government is Subject to the Constitution. The executive authority of the Federation shall be exercised in the name of the President by the Federal Government, consisting of the Prime Minister and the (Federal) Ministers, which shall act through the Prime Minister, who shall be the chief executive of the Federation.
In the performance of his functions under the Constitution, the Prime Minister may act either directly or through the (Federal) Ministers.

— Constitution of Pakistan: Part III: The Federation of Pakistan— Chapter 3: The Federal Government, Article 196–197, source

The basic civil and criminal laws governing the citizens of Pakistan are set down in major parliamentary legislation (a term inherited from the United Kingdom), such as the Exit Control List, the Pakistan Penal Code, and the now repealed Frontier Crimes Regulations. By the Article 246th and Article 247th to the constitution, the Islamic Jirga (or Panchayat) system has become an institution for local governance. The 1950s reforms in the government administration, the constitutional law and jurisprudence in Pakistan have been greatly influenced by the United States Of America ' legal system. Since the 1970s, the traditional jirga-based law has also been in place in a few areas, and has influenced the country's judicial development.

== Branches of government ==
=== Legislative branch ===
The legislative branch, being a bicameral, has two houses, which combined are known as the Parliament of Pakistan (Urdu: مجلسِ شوریٰ پاکستان, English: Consultative Council of Pakistan:

- The National Assembly, presided by Speaker of the National Assembly of Pakistan, deputed by the Deputy Speaker of the National Assembly of Pakistan, is the lower house and has 336 members (according to new census and emerging of FATA). 266 general members are elected directly by the people, while 60 seats are reserved for women and 10 seats for religious minorities.
- The Senate, presided by Chairman of the Senate of Pakistan, deputed by Deputy Chairman of the Senate of Pakistan. is the upper house and has 96 senators elected indirectly by members of respective provincial assemblies for the term of six years.

The Parliament enjoys parliamentary supremacy. All the Cabinet ministers, as well as the prime minister, must be members of Parliament (MPs), according to the constitution. The prime minister and the Cabinet ministers are jointly accountable to the Parliament. If there is a policy failure or lapse on the part of the government, all the members of the cabinet are jointly responsible. If a vote of no confidence is passed against the government, then the government collapses and a new one must be formed.

=== Executive branch ===
By general definition, the executive branch of government is the one that has sole authority and responsibility for the daily administration of the state bureaucracy. The division of power into separate branches of government is central to the republican idea of the separation of powers. The separation of powers system is designed to distribute authority away from the executive branch – an attempt to preserve individual liberty in response to tyrannical leadership throughout history.

==== Prime Minister and Cabinet ====
The Prime Minister of Pakistan (Urdu: وزیراعظم; lit: Wazir-e- Azam), is the executive head of government of Pakistan, constitutionally designated as the Chief Executive (CE). after the retirement of the Prime Minister, an interim (or Caretaker) Prime Minister is appointed by the president of Pakistan after consulting incumbent Prime Minister and the Leader of the Opposition of the national assembly.

The Prime Minister must be a Muslim citizen of Pakistan above 25 years of age. There have been 20 different Prime Ministers of Pakistan, with 24 different tenures, where only three people (Benazir Bhutto, Nawaz Sharif, and Shehbaz Sharif) to become Prime Minister of Pakistan more than once. None of them complete their 5 years tenure. Pakistan also has had 4 Caretaker Prime Ministers.

The Prime Minister makes key appointments on various important positions, including;

- The federal secretaries as head of cabinet- level ministries
- The chief secretaries of the provinces
- Key administrative and military personnel in the Pakistan Armed Forces
- The chairmen of large public sector organisations and corporations such as NHA, TCP, PNSC, etc.
- The chairmen and other members of the federal commissions and public institutions
- Ambassadors and High Commissioners to other countries

The Cabinet can have a maximum of 11 percent (50 members including the Prime Minister) of the total strength of the Parliament. Each Cabinet member must be a member of Parliament (MP). The Minister can be from the either house of the Parliament, but maximum 1/4th of the Ministers can be from the Senate. The Cabinet Ministers chair the Cabinet and are further assisted by the Cabinet Secretary of Pakistan, whose appointment comes from the Civil Services of Pakistan. Other Ministers are Ministers of State, junior members who report directly to one of the Cabinet Ministers, often overseeing a specific aspect of government.

Once appointed by the prime minister, all Cabinet Ministers are officially confirmed to their appointment offices by the president in a special oath of ceremony.

The president of Pakistan, officially the President of the Islamic Republic of Pakistan, is the ceremonial head of state of Pakistan and the commander-in-chief of the Pakistan Armed Forces.

The office of president was created upon the proclamation of Islamic Republic on 23 March 1956. The then serving governor-general, Major-General Iskander Mirza, assumed office as the first president. Following the 1958 coup d'etat, the office of prime minister was abolished, leaving the Presidency as the most powerful office in the country. This position was further strengthened when the 1962 Constitution was adopted. It turned Pakistan into a Presidential Republic, giving all executive powers to the president. In 1973, the new Constitution established Parliamentary democracy and reduced president's role to a ceremonial one. Nevertheless, the military takeover in 1977 reversed the changes. The 8th Amendment turned Pakistan into a semi-presidential republic and in the period between 1985 and 2010, the executive power was shared by president and prime minister. The 18th Amendment in 2010 restored Parliamentary Democracy in the country, and reduced presidency to a ceremonial position.

The constitution prohibits the president from directly running the government. Instead, the executive power is exercised on his behalf by the prime minister who keeps him informed on all matters of internal and foreign policy, as well as all legislative proposals. The Constitution however, vests the president with the powers of granting pardons, reprieves, and the control over the military; however, all appointments at higher commands of the military must be made by the president on a "required and necessary" basis, upon consultation and approval from the prime minister.

The president is indirectly elected by the Electoral College for a five-year term. The Constitution requires the president to be a "Muslim of not less than forty five (45) years of age". The president resides in an estate in Islamabad known as Aiwan-e-Sadar (President's House). In his absence, the chairman of Senate exercises the responsibilities of the post, until the actual president resumes office, or the next office holder is elected.

There have been a total of 13 presidents. The first president was Iskander Ali Mirza who entered office on 23 March 1956. The current office holder is Asif Ali Zardari, who took charge on 10 March 2024, following his victory in the 2023 elections.

=== Judicial branch ===
Pakistan's independent judicial system began under the British Raj, and its concepts and procedures resemble those of Anglo-Saxon countries. Institutional and judicial procedures were later changed, in 1950s, under the influence of American legal system to remove the fundamental rights problems. The judiciary consists of the Supreme Court of Pakistan, Provincial High Courts, District Courts, Anti-terrorism courts, Sharia courts, and Environmental courts all over the country; Supreme Court being the superior court. The Supreme Court of Pakistan consists of a Chief Justice, and Senior Justices appointed by the president after consultation with the Chief Justice of Pakistan. The Constitution does not fix the number of justices of the Supreme Court, though it can be fixed by Parliament through an act signed by the president.

==== Judicature transfer ====
The Constitution grants powers to the Supreme Court to make judicature transfers. Although the proceedings in the Supreme Court arise out of the judgement or orders made by the subordinate courts, the Supreme Court reserves the right to transfer any case, appeal or proceedings pending before any High Court to any other High Court.

==== Supreme Judicial Council ====
Misconduct of judges is highly intolerable as is mentioned in the constitution. Under the mainframe of the Supreme Judicial Council Article 209 an inquiry into the capacity or conduct of a Judge, who is a member of the council, may be conducted.

== Civil service ==
The civil service of Pakistan is the permanent bureaucracy of the Government of Pakistan. The civil servants are the permanent officials of the government, occupying a respected image in the civil society. Civil servants come from different cadres (e.g. Pakistan Administrative Service, Police Service of Pakistan etc.) after passing the CSS examinations. Not all the employees of the Government of Pakistan are civil servants; other employees of the Government of Pakistan come from the scientific institutions, state-owned corporations and commissioned military science circles.

In the parliamentary democracy, the ultimate responsibility for running the administration rests with the elected representatives of the people who are the ministers. These ministers are accountable to the legislatures which are also elected by the people on the basis of universal adult suffrage. The cabinet and its ministers are expected to lay down the policy guidelines, and the civil servants are responsible for implementing and enforcing it.

=== Federal secretaries ===
The federal secretaries are the most senior, experienced, and capable officials in the country. Each ministry/division has its Secretary to oversee and enforce the public policy matters.

The secretaries, who are basic pay scale (BPS)-22 grade officers, are largely considered to be the most powerful officials in the country. Due to the importance of their respective assignments, there are twelve specific federal secretaries which are considered to be the most vital in the Government of Pakistan. These include the Secretary Establishment (responsible for civil service matters), Secretary Commerce (responsible for trade), Secretary Cabinet (responsible for Cabinet Division), Secretary to the Prime Minister (responsible for Prime Minister's Office), Secretary Interior (responsible for law and order), Secretary Finance (responsible for the country's treasury), Secretary Foreign Affairs (responsible for foreign relations), Secretary Maritime Affairs (responsible for ports and shipping), Secretary Power (responsible for the electricity and power sector), Secretary Planning and Development (responsible for development projects), Secretary Petroleum (responsible for the petroleum sector) and Secretary Industries (responsible for industrial development).

Management of major crisis situations in the country and coordination of activities of the various Ministries in such situations are the functions of the Cabinet Division. Appointment for the chairman of the FPSC, the prestigious body responsible for the recruitment of elite bureaucrats, is made by the president after consulting the prime minister, according to Article 242 of the Constitution.

== Elections and voting system ==
Since 1947, Pakistan has an asymmetric federal government, with elected officials at the national (federal), provincial, tribal, and local levels. Constitution has set the limit of government for five years, but if a Vote of no confidence movements takes place in the parliament (and prelude of movements are proved at the Judicial branch), the government falls and immediately replaced with caretaker government initiated by the president (consultation of Prime Minister also required to make such move), in regards to Article 58 of the constitution.

There has been four times that the martial law has been in effect, and controversially approved by the supreme court. Through a general election where the leader of the majority winning party is selected to be the Prime Minister. All members of the federal legislature, the Parliament, are directly elected. Elections in Pakistan take place every five years by universal adult suffrage.

== Administration and governments ==
=== Provincial and Local governments ===
There are four provincial governments that rule the four provinces of the state. The Chief Minister heads the provincial government. All provincial assemblies are unicameral, elected for five years. The Governors appointed by President after consulting the Prime minister, act only as representatives of federal government in the province and do not have any part in running the government.

The provincial governments tend to have the greatest influence over most Pakistanis' daily lives. The Local government functions at the basic level. It is the third level of government, consisting Jirga in rural tribal areas.

== Finances ==
=== Taxation and budget ===
Pakistan has a complex taxation system of more than 70 unique taxes administered by at least 37 tax collection institutions of the Government of Pakistan. Taxation is a debated and controversial issue in public and political science circle of the country, and according to the International Development Committee, Pakistan had a lower-than-average tax take. Only 0.57% of Pakistanis, or 768,000 people out of a population of 190 million pay income tax.

The Finance Minister of Pakistan presents the annual federal budget in the Parliament in the midst of the year, and it has to be passed by both houses of the Parliament. The budget is preceded by an economic survey which outlines the broad direction of the budget and the economic performance of the country for the outgoing financial fiscal year.

=== National Finance Commission program overview ===
Constituted under the Article 160 of the Constitution of Pakistan by the Constitution, the National Finance Commission Award (NFC) program is a series of planned economic programs to take control of financial imbalances and equally manage the financial resources for the four provinces to meet their expenditure liabilities while alleviating the horizontal fiscal imbalances.

According to stipulations and directions of the Constitution, the provisional governments and Federal government compete to get higher share of the program's revenues in order to stabilise their own financial status.

== Ministries and divisions ==
Ministries of the Federal Government of Pakistan
	Federal Ministerial Departments	Ministerial Divisions	Creation
1	Cabinet Secretariat		
1	Cabinet Secretariat	Cabinet Division	
1	Cabinet Secretariat	Establishment Division	
1	Cabinet Secretariat	National Security Division	
1	Cabinet Secretariat	Intelligence Bureau Division	
1	Cabinet Secretariat	Special Investment Facilitation Council Division	
2	Climate Change	Climate Change Division	
3	Commerce	Commerce Division	
4	Communications	Communications Division	1947
5	Defence	Defence Division	1947
6	Defence Production	Defence Production Division	1972
7	Economic Affairs	Economic Affairs Division	
8	Energy	Petroleum Division	
8	Energy	Power Division	
9	Federal Education and Professional Training	Federal Education and Professional Training Division	
10	Finance, Revenue	Finance Division	
10	Finance, Revenue	Revenue Division	
11	Foreign Affairs	Foreign Affairs Division	1947
12	Housing and Works	Housing and Works Division	
13	Human Rights	Human Rights Division	
14	Industries and Production	Industries and Production Division	
15	Information and Broadcasting	Information and Broadcasting Division	
15	Information and Broadcasting	National Heritage and Culture Division	
16	Information Technology and Telecommunication	Information Technology and Telecommunication Division	
17	Interior	Interior Division	
18	Inter-Provincial Coordination	Inter-Provincial Coordination Division	
19	Kashmir Affairs, Gilgit Baltistan and States and Frontier Regions	Kashmir Affairs, Gilgit-Baltistan and States and Frontier Regions Division	
20	Law and Justice	Law and Justice Division	
21	Maritime Affairs	Maritime Affairs Division	
22	National Food Security and Research	National Food Security and Research Division	
23	National Health Services, Regulations and Coordination	National Health Services, Regulations and Coordination Division	
24	Overseas Pakistanis and Human Resource Development	Overseas Pakistanis and Human Resource Development Division	
25	Parliamentary Affairs	Parliamentary Affairs Division	
26	Planning, Development and Special Initiatives	Planning, Development and Special Initiatives Division	
27	Poverty Alleviation and Social Safety	Poverty Alleviation and Social Safety Division	
28	Privatisation	Privatisation Division	
29	Railways	Railways Division	
30	Religious Affairs and Inter-faith Harmony	Religious Affairs and Inter-faith Harmony Division	
31	Science and Technology	Science and Technology Division	
32	Water Resources	Water Resources Division	

== VIP Aircraft ==
Aircraft	Image	Quantity	Note
AW139		At least 5	

== See also ==
- Corruption in Pakistan
- Economic Coordination Committee
- Federal Bureau of Statistics (Pakistan)
- The Gazette of Pakistan
- Grade 22
- List of provincial governments of Pakistan
- Ministry of Finance (Pakistan)
- Pakistan Institute of International Affairs
