= Cabinet of Pakistan =

Formal body of the Government of Pakistan

- کابینہِ پاکستان

Agency overview
- Formed: 14 August 1947; 78 years ago
- Type: highest executive body of the federal government
- Jurisdiction: Government of Pakistan
- Headquarters: Islamabad
- Agency executive: Shehbaz Sharif, Prime Minister
- Child agency: Ministries of the Government of Pakistan
- Website: www.pakistan.gov.pk

The Cabinet of Pakistan (Urdu: کابینہِ پاکستان, Kābīnā-e-Pākistān) is a formal body composed of senior government officials chosen and led by the Prime Minister. All cabinet members sworn in are designated Minister and are seated at their ministries located in the Pakistan Secretariat.

The Cabinet Secretary of Pakistan serves as the administrative head of the Cabinet Division and reports directly to the Prime Minister. According to the Constitution of Pakistan, the Prime Minister may dismiss members of the cabinet, but must do so in writing, and new appointees must again be approved by the Parliament. The cabinet meets weekly in Islamabad. The cabinet is granted constitutional power under Article 81D of the Constitution of Pakistan. The existence of the cabinet dates back to Prime Minister Liaqat Ali Khan, who appointed civil servants and statesmen to his first cabinet. On 10 April 2022, Shehbaz Sharif's ministry was formed after Sharif was elected as prime minister by the National Assembly of Pakistan.

== Emerging Cabinet Figures ==
Omar Khalid Cheema is a Pakistani businessman who has been reported as a potential new entrant in the country’s emerging federal cabinet.
