= Bhatti (surname) =

Bhatti is a surname.

People with surname include;

- Adil Bhatti (born 1984), American cricketer
- Arfan Bhatti (born 1977), Norwegian Islamist, and a leading figure in the Islamic State-affiliated group Profetens Ummah
- Arif Iqbal Bhatti (died 1997), Pakistani jurist who was Judge of the Lahore High Court and was murdered for alleged blasphemy in verdict
- Arif Masih Bhatti (born 1970), Pakistani politician who had been a Member of the Provincial Assembly of Sindh, from June 2013 to May 2018
- Barbar Bhatti (born 1949), British actor of Pakistani origin
- Bhanwar Singh Bhati (born 1974), Indian politician who is serving as the State Higher Education Minister of Rajasthan
- Bilal Akbar Bhatti (born 1976), Pakistani politician who was a Member of the Provincial Assembly of the Punjab, from May 2013 to May 2018
- Bilawal Bhatti (born 1991), international cricketer from Pakistan, primarily utilized as an all-rounder
- Gurpreet Kaur Bhatti, ’s first play Behsharam (Shameless) broke box office records when it played at Soho Theatre and the Birmingham Rep in 2001.
- Irfan Bhatti (cricketer, born 1964), Pakistani cricketer
- Irfan Bhatti (cricketer, born 1979), Kuwaiti cricketer
- Imtiaz Bhatti (1933–2024), Pakistani cyclist and Air Force pilot and officer
- Jamie Bhatti (born 1993), Scottish international rugby union footballer who currently plays as a loose head prop for Edinburgh Rugby
- Jaspal Bhatti, former Indian comedian and actor
- Javed Bhatti, former cricketer who played first-class cricket for Bahawalpur in Pakistan from 1958 to 1975
- Mehdi Hassan Bhatti (born 1955), politician from Hafizabad District, Punjab, Pakistan
- Muhammad Ameer Bhatti (born 1962), has been Justice of the Lahore High Court since 12 May 2011
- Muhammad Irfan Saeed Bhatti (born 1992), Pakistani badminton player
- Mukhtar Bhatti (born 1932), Pakistani field hockey player. He competed in the men's tournament at the 1948 Summer Olympics
- Munir Bhatti, retired field hockey player who was a member of the Pakistan National Hockey Team from 1978 to 1979. He was born in Sialkot. A half back, he was capped by Pakistan 13 times, scoring no goals
- Nighat Intisar Bhatti (born 1966), Pakistani politician who had been a Member of the Provincial Assembly of the Punjab, from May 2014 to May 2018
- Omer Bhatti (born 1984), Norwegian rapper and dancer
- Parveen Masood Bhatti, Pakistani politician who had been a member of the National Assembly of Pakistan, from March 2008 to May 2018
- Parwano Bhatti (1934–2016), prominent Sindhi-language poet, writer and journalist. He died at the age of 82
- Paul Bhatti, continues his struggle as Chairman of All Pakistan Minorities Alliance (APMA) and Shahbaz Bhatti Memorial Trust (SBMT)
- Rai Bhoe Bhatti (14the century), Muslim Rajput noble
- Rai Bular Bhatti (died 1515), Muslim Rajput noble, son of the above
- Raja Aziz Bhatti (1928–1965), military officer in the Pakistan Army who was cited with the Nishan-e-Haider (Eng. Lit.: Emblem of Lion) for his actions of valor during the Battle of Burki in second war with India in 1965
- Rasheed Bhatti (born 1952), Pakistani former first-class cricketer who played for Lahore cricket team. Later he became an umpire and stood in matches in the 2005–06 ABN-AMRO Twenty-20 Cup
- Rao Bhatti, credited with establishing the modern town of Bathinda, Indian Punjab in the Lakhi jungle area in the 3rd century
- Rustam Bhatti (born 1990), Canadian cricketer of Pakistani origin who represents the Canada national cricket team. He is a right hand batsman who has also captained the Canada U-19 cricket team
- Saqib Bhatti (born 1985), British Conservative Party politician who has been the Member of Parliament (MP) for Meriden since the 2019 general election
- Shahid Hussain Bhatti, Pakistani politician who had been a member of the National Assembly of Pakistan, from September 2013 to May 2018
- Shaukat Ali Bhatti (born 1974), Pakistani politician who has been a member of the National Assembly of Pakistan since August 2018
- Sidra Nawaz (born 1994), Pakistani Cricketer
- Umar Bhatti, A Canadian cricketer
- Waseem Bhatti (born 1978), French cricketer of Pakistani origin
- Zafar Rasheed Bhatti (1950s–2020), Pakistani journalist

== See also ==
- Bhatti Kavya
- Bhati (surname)
