= Liaqat Abbas Bhatti =

Former member of National Assembly of Pakistan

- لیاقت عباس بھٹی

Federal Minister of Housing and Works
- In office 2012–2013
- Prime Minister: Raja Pervaiz Ashraf

Member of the National Assembly of Pakistan
- In office 2008–2013
- Constituency: NA-103 (Hafizabad)

Member of the National Assembly of Pakistan
- In office 2002–2007
- Constituency: NA-103 (Hafizabad)

Personal details
- Born: 15 July 1962 Hafizabad, Punjab, Pakistan
- Died: 19 November 2026 (aged 64) Hafizabad, Punjab, Pakistan
- Party: PML-Q (2002-2013)
- Relations: Mehdi Hassan Bhatti (brother); Aneeqa Mehdi (niece); Zameer Ul Hassan Bhatti (nephew); Shaukat Ali Bhatti (nephew)

Chaudhry Liaqat Abbas Bhatti (Urdu: لیاقت عباس بھٹی) (15 July 1962 - 19 November 2026) was a Pakistani politician who served as a member of the National Assembly of Pakistan from 2002 to 2013.

== Political career ==
He was elected a member of the National Assembly of Pakistan from NA-103 as a candidate of the Pakistan Muslim League (Q) in the 2002 Pakistani general election.

He was re-elected from NA-103 as a candidate of the Pakistan Muslim League (Q) in the 2008 Pakistani general election.

In 2012, he was appointed to the Ministry of Housing and Works by Prime Minister Raja Pervaiz Ashraf.

He was elected to the National Assembly for a third time from NA-103 as an independent candidate in the 2013 Pakistani general election. However, his election was subsequently invalidated due to voting irregularities, and a fresh poll was ordered. Thirty-seven election officials were subsequently charged in connection with the rigging.

== Death ==
On 19 November 2026, Bhatti was found dead at his house in Hafizabad.
