= Muhammad Ahsan Jahangir =

Pakistani politician

Member of the Provincial Assembly of the Punjab
- In office 15 August 2018 – 14 January 2023
- Constituency: PP-71 Hafizabad-III

Personal details
- Born: Mian Muhammad Ahsan Jahangir Bhatti; 15 November 1991 (age 34)
- Other political affiliations: PTI (2018-2023)
- Relations: Shahid Hussain Bhatti (uncle); Nighat Intisar Bhatti (aunt)

Mian Muhammad Ahsan Jahangir Bhatti is a Pakistani politician who had been a member of the Provincial Assembly of the Punjab from August 2018 till January 2023.

== Early life and education ==
Ahsan Jahangir was born on 15 November 1991 into a political family: His grandfather Mian Jahangir Khan Bhatti, his father Mian Ansar Abbas Bhatti, his uncle Mian Shahid Hussain Khan Bhatti, his uncle Intisar Hussain Bhatti and his aunt Nighat Intisar Bhatti have all been parliamentarians.

He did his A Levels in 2011 from The Institute of Legal Studies (TILS), Lahore.

== Political career ==
He was elected to the Provincial Assembly of the Punjab as a candidate of Pakistan Tehreek-e-Insaf from Constituency PP-71 (Hafizabad-III) in the 2018 Pakistani general election.
