= Ministry of National Health Services, Regulation and Coordination =

Government ministry of Pakistan

- قومی وزارتِ ضوابط ، ربطِ باہمی و خدماتِ صحتِ عامّہ vazārat-i ḍawābiṭ, rabṭ-i bāhamī va khidmāt-i ṣihat-i ʿāmmah

Agency overview
- Formed: April 2012; 14 years ago
- Jurisdiction: Government of Pakistan
- Headquarters: Islamabad
- Minister responsible: Bilal Farooq Tarar
- Agency executive: Iftikhar Ali Shallwani, Health Secretary of Pakistan
- Website: nhsrc.gov.pk

The Ministry of National Health Services, Regulation and Coordination (Urdu: قومی وزارتِ ضوابط ، ربطِ باہمی و خدماتِ صحتِ عامّہ vazārat-i ḍawābiṭ, rabṭ-i bāhamī va khidmāt-i ṣihat-i ʿāmmah; abbreviated as MoNHSRC) is a cabinet level ministry of the government of Pakistan with responsibility for national public health.

== History ==
Healthcare was transferred to the provincial health departments after Eighteenth Amendment to the Constitution of Pakistan in June 2011. In May 2013 however the federal ministry was reinstated by Prime Minister Mir Hazar Khan Khoso, as the Ministry of National Health Services, Regulation and Coordination.

The function of this new ministry was to provide provision of medical services, frame health policies and enforce the same at a national level. Literacy and Basic Education Department with focus on Skill Development Programmers and Vocational Education.

== Ministers ==
Portrait	Minister (Birth-Death) Constituency	Term of office			Political party	Ministry	Prime Minister
Portrait	Minister (Birth-Death) Constituency	From	To	Period	Political party	Ministry	Prime Minister
	Imran Khan	18 August 2018	20 August 2018	3 days	Pakistan Tehreek-e-Insaf	Imran Khan government	Imran Khan
	Saira Afzal Tarar (born 1966); MNA for Hafizabad-I (Minister of State until 28 Jul 2017)	7 June 2013	28 July 2017	4 years, 51 days	Pakistan Muslim League (N)	Nawaz III	Nawaz Sharif
	Saira Afzal Tarar (born 1966); MNA for Hafizabad-I (Minister of State until 28 Jul 2017)	4 August 2017	31 May 2018	300 days	Pakistan Muslim League (N)	Abbasi	Shahid Khaqan Abbasi
	Mohammad Yusuf Shaikh (Caretaker Minister)	5 June 2018	18 August 2018	74 days	Independent	Mulk	Nasirul Mulk
	Aamir Mehmood Kiani; MNA for Rawalpindi-V	20 August 2018	18 April 2019	241 days	Pakistan Tehreek-e-Insaf	Imran Khan	Imran Khan
	Zafar Mirza (Special Assistant to the Prime Minister/ with rank of Minister of State)	18 April 2019	29 July 2020	1 year, 102 days	Pakistan Tehreek-e-Insaf	Imran Khan	Imran Khan
	Faisal Sultan (Special Assistant to the Prime Minister/ with rank of Federal Minister)	3 August 2020	10 April 2022	1 year, 250 days	Pakistan Tehreek-e-Insaf	Imran Khan	Imran Khan
	Abdul Qadir Patel (born 1968); MNA for Karachi Keamari-II	19 April 2022	10 August 2023	1 year, 113 days	Pakistan Muslim League (N)	Shehbaz I	Shehbaz Sharif
	Nadeem Jan (Caretaker Minister)	17 August 2023	4 April 2024	231 days	Independent	Kakar	Anwaar ul Haq Kakar
Position vacant during this interval
	Syed Mustafa Kamal (born 1971); MNA for Karachi Keamari-I	27 February 2025	Incumbent	1 year, 250 days	MQM-P	Shehbaz II	Shehbaz Sharif

== Provincial departments ==
- (Azad Kashmir) Department of Health, Azad Jammu & Kashmir
- (Balochistan, Pakistan) Department of Health, Balochistan
- Department of Health & Population Welfare, Gilgit-Baltistan

== Autonomous Bodies ==
=== Drug Regulatory Authority of Pakistan ===
Drug Regulatory Authority of Pakistan was established under the Drug Regulatory Authority of Pakistan Act, 2012, is the main constitutional body to regulate therapeutic goods in the country. Therapeutic goods regulated by the DRAP include drugs, biological, medical devices, alternative medicines & health products. Previously, scope was limited to Drugs and Biologicals, however, it was extended to other categories after enactment of the Drugs Regulatory Authority of Pakistan Act, 2012.

Drug Regulatory Authority of Pakistan (DRAP) is mandated to provide for effective coordination and enforcement of The Drugs Act, 1976 (XXXI of 1976) and to bring harmony in inter-provincial trade and commerce of therapeutic goods. DRAP is responsible for ensuring that therapeutic goods approved and available in market meet prescribed standards of quality, safety and efficacy and are sold at reasonable prices. This includes registration and marketing authorization, vigilance, market surveillance and control, licensing establishments, regulatory inspection, laboratory testing, clinical trials oversight, pharmacovigilance and lot release of biologicals.

The Drug Regulatory Authority of Pakistan was established in 2012 and is the largest department in the Ministry of National Health Services, Regulation and Coordination, with its headquarters in Islamabad and regional offices in the provincial capitals of Karachi, Lahore, Peshawar and Quetta. DRAP has been established by the Federal Government, and its General direction, Administration and monitoring of the Authority vests with Policy Board of DRAP. The Authority comprises a Chief Executive Officer (CEO), appointed by the Federal Government and thirteen Directors, leading each Division of DRAP which perform various functions as mandated under the DRAP Act, 2012. These Divisions are majorly divided into two types, those performing regulatory activities as follows:

- Division of Pharmaceutical Evaluations & Registration
- Division of Drug Licensing
- Division of Health and OTC Products (non-drugs)
- Division of Medical Devices and Medicated Cosmetics
- Division of Pharmacy Services
- Division of Quality Assurance and Laboratory Testing
- Division of Biological Evaluation and Research
- Division of Controlled Drugs
- Division of Costing and Pricing

While supportive Divisions are;

- Division of Management Information Services
- Division of Budget and Accounts
- Division of Legal Affairs
- Division of Administration, HR and Logistics

=== Tobacco Control Cell ===
A separate cell was created in 2007. The rationale for the creation of the Cell stemmed from Pakistan’s international obligation. Pakistan is a signatory to WHO Framework Convention on Tobacco Control. The aim of Tobacco Control Cell is to enhance tobacco control efforts in Pakistan.

=== National Institute of Population Studies ===
National Institute of Population Studies (NIPS) is the research organization established by the government since 1986. The NIPS has been mandated to act as a technical arm of the Government for undertaking high quality research and to produce evidence-based data, information for utilization by the Public sector and others agencies for policy formulation, strategic planning and making reference in the spheres of demography, population & development and health.

=== Directorate of Malaria Control ===
Directorate of Malaria Control is a separate cell in ministry to co-ordinate country-wide efforts for implementation of Roll Back Malaria initiative for 50% reduction in the malaria burden in Pakistan by the year 2010. By the year 2015 >70% of the high risk population of Pakistan having access and using effective malaria prevention and treatment.

== Programs ==
The ministry directly runs several federal health programs nationwide:

=== National AIDS Control Program ===
National AIDS Control Program (NACP) was established in 1986-87. In its early stages, the program focused on laboratory diagnosis of suspected HIV cases.

=== National Tuberculosis Control Program ===
Having treated 700,000 tuberculosis patients so far, free diagnosis and treatment and public awareness regarding the disease are the main components of this program. It is currently headed by Lt. Aazam Parvez, Pakistan Army Medical Corps.

== Devolved programs ==
The following programs were transferred to provincial health departments in 2011.

- National Program for Family Planning & Primary Health Care (LHW) Program

LHW Program is the world's largest community based primary health care program delivering services through 96,000 LHWs in their own communities

- Expanded Program on Immunization (EPI)

EPI is aimed at immunizing children against Childhood Tuberculosis, Poliomyelitis, Diphtheria, Pertussis, Measles, Tetanus and also their mothers against Tetanus.

- National Maternal, Neonatal & Child Health (MNCH) Program

The aim of the MNCH program is to improve accessibility and quality of health services and fill the resource gaps without duplicating inputs or activities.

- National Program for Prevention and Control of Hepatitis

More than 400,000 people have been vaccinated through this program, while 104 hospitals have been equipped to provide free treatment to patients.

== See also ==
- Health care in Pakistan
- Family planning in Pakistan
