= Rasulpur Tarar =

Town in Punjab, Pakistan

- Interactive map of Rasulpur Tarar
- Coordinates: 32.0573°N 73.4607°E
- Country: Pakistan
- Province: Punjab
- District: Hafizabad
- Tehsil: Pindi Bhattian

Rasulpur Tarar is a village of Hafizabad District, Punjab, Pakistan. The village is part of Pindi Bhattian Tehsil. A road from the village leads to Jalalpur Bhattian and then to Hafizabad.

There is a Rural Health Centre in the village.
