= PP-38 Hafizabad-II =

Constituency of the Punjabi Provincial Legislature, Pakistan

- Constituency for the Provincial Assembly of Punjab
- Region: Hafizabad Tehsil (partly) including Hafizabad city of Hafizabad District

Current constituency
- Created from: PP-105 Hafizabad-I (2002-2018); PP-70 Hafizabad-II (2018-2023)

PP-38 Hafizabad-II (پی پی-38، حافظ آباد-2) is a Constituency of Provincial Assembly of Punjab.

== General elections 2024 ==
Provincial election 2024: PP-38 Hafizabad-II
Party	Candidate	Votes	%	±%
Independent	Zameer UI Hassan Bhatti (Note: Filed nomination papers as PTI candidate but ECP allowed him to run as an Independent)	52,217	35.62	
PML(N)	Gulzar Ahmad	50,839	34.68	
Independent	Gul Nawaz	23,606	16.10	
TLP	Usman Khizar Mangat	11,296	7.71	
JI	Muhammad Yasin	2,863	1.95	
PPP	Syed Waseem UI Hassan Naqvi	2,674	1.82	
Others	Others (thirteen candidates)	3,705	2.12	
Turnout		149,824	52.29	
Total valid votes		146,600	97.85	
Rejected ballots		3,224	2.15	
Majority		1,378	0.94	
Registered electors		286,500		
hold				

== General elections 2018 ==
Provincial election 2018: PP-70 Hafizabad-II
Party	Candidate	Votes	%	±%
PML(N)	Muzaffer Ali Sheikh	49,116	38.53	
PTI	Malik Fayaz Ahmad	46,118	36.18	
TLP	Syed Waseem UI Hasan Naqvi	24,763	19.42	
Independent	Ch. Muhammad Asad Ullah	2,230	1.75	
AAT	Hafeez Ullah	2,229	1.75	
PPP	Fakhar Abbas	2,143	1.68	
Others	Others (five candidates)	887	0.72	
Turnout		130,536	55.20	
Total valid votes		127,486	97.66	
Rejected ballots		3,050	2.34	
Majority		2,998	2.35	
Registered electors		236,460		

== General elections 2013 ==
Provincial election 2013: PP-105 Hafizabad-I
Party	Candidate	Votes	%	±%
PML(N)	Malik Fiaz Ahmad Awan	55,021	46.85	
Independent	Muzaffar Ali Sheikh	37,188	31.67	
Independent	Syed Wasim Ul Hassan Naqvi	9,661	8.23	
PPP	Malik Shaukat Hayat Awan	6,261	5.33	
PTI	Ali Abbas Awan	3,800	3.24	
Independent	Iftikhar Ali Ansari	1,623	1.38	
JI	Habib Ullah Cheema	1,452	1.24	
Others	Others (nine candidates)	2,432	2.07	
Turnout		119,927	60.50	
Total valid votes		117,438	97.93	
Rejected ballots		2,489	2.07	
Majority		17,833	15.18	
Registered electors		198,218		

== General elections 2008 ==
Provincial election 2008 : PP-105 Hafizabad-I
Party	Candidate	Votes	%	±%
PPP	Malik Fiaz Ahmed	34,134	44.90	
PML(Q)	Haji Rai Riasat Ali	24,507	32.24	
PML(N)	Syed Shabbir Hussain Shah	10,844	14.26	
Independent	Rana Muhammad Saleem Shakar	6,119	8.05	
Independent	Ch. Shoukat Ali Bhatti	206	0.27	
Independent	Rana Muhammad Nawaz	141	0.19	
Independent	Laila Muqaddas Adovcate	38	0.05	
Independent	Mian Shoaib Ahmad Virk	18	0.02	
Independent	Syed Waseem-ul-Hassan Naqvi	13	0.02	
Turnout		79,424	57.84	
Total valid votes		76,020	95.71	
Rejected ballots		3,404	4.29	
Majority		9,627	12.66	
Registered electors		137,307		

== See also ==
- PP-37 Hafizabad-I
- PP-39 Hafizabad-III
