= Lalke =

- Town
- Location within Pakistan
- Coordinates: 32°13′7.32″N 73°35′11.148″E
- Country: Pakistan
- Province: Punjab

Area
  - Total: 25 km^{2} (9.7 sq mi)
- Elevation: 210 m (690 ft)
- Time zone: UTC+5 (PST)
- Calling code: 0547

Lalke, or Lalke Dhiranke Tarar, is a village in Hafizabad District, Punjab, Pakistan. It is located at 31° 48' 46N 73° 50' 19E and lies 11 km to the north of Hafizabad.
