= Mehdi Hassan Bhatti =

Member of the National Assembly of Pakistan

Chaudhary Mehdi Hassan Bhatti

Member of the National Assembly of Pakistan
- In office 2002–2007
- Constituency: NA-87 (Hafizabad)
- In office 1993–1997
- Constituency: NA-87 (Hafizabad)

Member of the Provincial Assembly of Punjab
- In office 1985–1988
- In office 1988–1990
- In office 1990–1993

Personal details
- Born: October 4, 1955 (age 70) Hafizabad
- Party: Pakistan Tehreek-e-Insaf (2017-)
- Other political affiliations: Pakistan Muslim League (Q) (2002-2013); Pakistan People Party (1993-2002)
- Children: Chaudhary Shaukat Ali Bhatti (son); Ali Hassan Bhatti (son); Aneeqa Mehdi Bhatti (daughter)

Chaudhary Mehdi Hassan Bhatti is a Pakistani politician. An agriculturist by profession, he hails from the Hafizabad District of Punjab.

== Political career ==
Bhatti was elected as an MPA for the Punjab Assembly for three consecutive terms in 1985, 1988, and 1990. He was elected for his first term as an MNA in 1993. Later again, he was elected as an MNA in the 2002 general election.

Mehdi Hassan Bhatti served as chairman of the Standing Committee of Ministry of Sports and Agriculture in the government of Prime Minister Zafarullah Khan Jamali, Shaukat Aziz and Chaudhary Shujaat Hussain. He also served as the member of Standing Committee on Communications, Standing Committee on Planning and Development and Standing Committee on Water and Power.

Among his supporters he is greatly admired for the development of Hafizabad during his tenures that includes the upgrade of Hafizabad from a tehsil of Gujranwala District to a district in its own right in 1993, as well as the provision of schools, electricity, telephone service, metalled roads and three M-2 interchanges, and Sui gas to the remotest villages of Hafizabad; whereas, his opponents propagate his notorious aspects of his personality. Mehdi Hassan Bhatti is also known for maintaining pressure blocs within national and provincial assembly and it was vividly displayed in 2006 when he resigned from Parliament along with a number of parliamentarians.

== Personal life ==
His brother Liaqat Abbas Bhatti has been elected as member of the National Assembly 3 times, and he also served as Federal Minister for Public work department from 2010 to 2013. His son Shaukat Ali Bhatti served as the Minister of Culture and Youth Affairs in the government of Chaudhry Pervaiz Elahi in Punjab and was the recent MNA of Hafizabad before he submitted his resignation to Imran Khan.
