= PP-37 Hafizabad-I =

Constituency of the Punjabi Provincial Legislature, Pakistan

- Constituency for the Provincial Assembly of Punjab
- Region: Pindi Bhattian Tehsil including Jalalpur Bhattian town and Hafizabad Tehsil (partly) of Hafizabad District

Current constituency
- Created from: PP-106 Hafizabad-II (2002-2018); PP-69 Hafizabad-I (2018-2023)

PP-37 Hafizabad-I (پی پی-37، حافظ آباد-1) is a Constituency of Provincial Assembly of Punjab.

== General elections 2024 ==
Provincial election 2024: PP-37 Hafizabad-I
Party	Candidate	Votes	%	±%
PML(N)	Mian Shahid Hussain Khan	59,853	38.27	
Independent	Ch Muhammad Asad Ullah (Note: Filed nomination papers as PTI candidate but ECP allowed him to run as an Independent)	41,800	26.73	
IPP	Mamoon Jaffar Tarar	38,935	24.90	
TLP	Hafiz Faizan UI Hassan	6,832	4.37	
Independent	Aman Ullah	4,115	2.63	
Others	Others (ten candidates)	4,856	3.10	
Turnout		160,760	60.87	
Total valid votes		156,391	97.28	
Rejected ballots		4,369	2.72	
Majority		18,053	11.54	
Registered electors		264,099		
hold				

== General elections 2018 ==
Provincial election 2018: PP-69 Hafizabad-I
Party	Candidate	Votes	%	±%
PTI	Muhammad Mamoon Tarar	58,421	42.34	
PML(N)	Mian Shahid Hussain Khan	51,708	37.48	
TLP	Ch. Muhammad Asad Ullah	19,637	14.23	
Independent	Muhammad Farooq	2,928	2.12	
Independent	Ali Kamran	1,949	1.41	
PPP	Rai Safdar Ali	1,172	0.85	
Others	Others (eleven candidates)	2,155	1.57	
Turnout		141,154	62.70	
Total valid votes		137,970	97.74	
Rejected ballots		3,184	2.26	
Majority		6,713	4.86	
Registered electors		225,141		

== General elections 2013 ==
Provincial election 2013: PP-106 Hafizabad-II
Party	Candidate	Votes	%	±%
PML(N)	Chaudhary Muhammad Asad Ullah	51,543	46.43	
Independent	Rai Riasat Ali	36,589	32.96	
Independent	Rai Qamar Ul Zaman Kharal	16,306	14.69	
PTI	Muhammad Qasim Tarar	4,211	3.79	
JI	Aman Ullah Chattha	1,676	1.51	
Others	Others (two candidates)	699	0.63	
Turnout		114,613	66.72	
Total valid votes		111,024	96.87	
Rejected ballots		3,589	3.13	
Majority		14,954	13.47	
Registered electors		171,795		

== General elections 2008 ==
Provincial election 2008: PP-106 Hafizabad-II
Party	Candidate	Votes	%	±%
PML(N)	Ch. Muhammad Asad Ullah	40,072	45.59	
PML(Q)	Ch. Shaukat Ali Bhatti	34,167	38.87	
PPP	Muhammad Umar Tarar	7,867	8.95	
Independent	Ahmed Bakhsh Tarar	4,039	4.60	
Independent	Ch. Liaqat Abbas Bhatti	1,457	1.66	
Independent	Muhammad Farooq Tarar	147	0.17	
Independent	Haji Rai Riasat Ali	90	0.10	
Independent	Abid Ahsan	52	0.06	
Turnout		91,283	66.96	
Total valid votes		87,891	96.28	
Rejected ballots		3,392	3.72	
Majority		5,905	6.72	
Registered electors		136,326		

== See also ==
- PP-36 Wazirabad-II
- PP-38 Hafizabad-II
