= NA-67 Hafizabad =

National Assembly constituency in Punjab, Pakistan

- Constituency for the National Assembly of Pakistan
- Region: Hafizabad District
- Electorate: 810,723

Current constituency
- Created: 2024
- Party: Pakistan Tehreek-e-Insaf
- Member: Aneeqa Mehdi
- Created from: NA-102 Hafizabad-I and NA-103 Hafizabad-II

NA-67 Hafizabad (این اے-67، حافظ آباد) is a constituency of the National Assembly of Pakistan, covering the whole of Hafizabad District in Punjab. It was created through the 2023 delimitation by merging the former constituencies of NA-102 Hafizabad-I and NA-103 Hafizabad-II. An intermediate delimitation in 2018 had combined these two constituencies into NA-87 Hafizabad; the current designation NA-67 was assigned following the 2023 delimitation. At the 2024 general election the registered electorate stood at 810,723.

== Members of Parliament ==
=== 2002 to 2018: NA-102 Hafizabad-I ===
Election	Member	Party
2002	Mehdi Hassan Bhatti	PML-Q
2008	Saira Afzal Tarar	PML-N
2013	Saira Afzal Tarar	PML-N

=== 2018 to 2023: NA-87 Hafizabad ===
Election	Member	Party
2018	Shaukat Ali Bhatti	PTI

=== 2024 to present: NA-67 Hafizabad ===
Election	Member	Party
2024	Aneeqa Mehdi	PTI (Note: Filed nomination papers as a PTI candidate but was required by the Election Commission of Pakistan to contest as an independent candidate.)

== 2002 general election ==
General elections were held on 10 October 2002. The election in the predecessor constituency NA-102 Hafizabad-I was won by Mehdi Hassan Bhatti of PML-Q with 50,824 votes.

General election 2002: NA-102 Hafizabad-I
Party	Candidate	Votes	%	±%
PML(Q)	Mehdi Hassan Bhatti	50,824	45.87	
PML(N)	Muhammad Usman Tarar	43,218	39.01	
PPP	Ahmad Bilal Tarar	15,079	13.61	
Others	Others (two candidates)	1,669	1.51	
Turnout		114,784	51.78	
Total valid votes		110,790	96.52	
Rejected ballots		3,994	3.48	
Majority		7,606	6.86	
Registered electors		221,662		

== 2008 general election ==
General elections were held on 18 February 2008. Saira Afzal Tarar of PML-N won the predecessor constituency NA-102 Hafizabad-I with 56,313 votes.

General election 2008: NA-102 Hafizabad-I
Party	Candidate	Votes	%	±%
PML(N)	Saira Afzal Tarar	56,313	46.66	
PML(Q)	Shaukat Ali Bhatti	42,808	35.47	
PPP	Malik Shoukat Hayyat Awan	21,567	17.87	
Turnout		125,244	61.20	
Total valid votes		120,688	96.36	
Rejected ballots		4,556	3.64	
Majority		13,505	11.19	
Registered electors		204,649		

== 2013 general election ==
General elections were held on 11 May 2013. Saira Afzal Tarar of PML-N retained the predecessor constituency NA-102 Hafizabad-I with 93,691 votes.

General election 2013: NA-102 Hafizabad-I
Party	Candidate	Votes	%	±%
PML(N)	Saira Afzal Tarar	93,691	53.90	
Independent	Shaukat Ali Bhatti	67,625	38.91	
PTI	Riaz Ahmad Tarar	50,653	3.25	
PPP	Hajan Allah Rakhi	3,566	2.05	
Others	Others (seven candidates)	3,276	1.89	
Turnout		178,109	62.62	
Total valid votes		173,811	97.59	
Rejected ballots		4,298	2.41	
Majority		26,066	14.99	
Registered electors		284,417		

== 2018 general election ==
General elections were held on 25 July 2018. Under the 2018 delimitation, NA-102 and NA-103 were merged to form NA-87 Hafizabad. Shaukat Ali Bhatti of PTI won the seat with 165,618 votes.

General election 2018: NA-87 Hafizabad
Party	Candidate	Votes	%	±%
PTI	Shaukat Ali Bhatti	165,618	40.92	
PML(N)	Saira Afzal Tarar	157,453	38.90	
TLP	Liaquat Abbas	44,130	10.90	
Others	Others (eleven candidates)	27,957	6.91	
Turnout		404,723	59.13	
Rejected ballots		9,565	2.37	
Majority		8,165	2.02	
Registered electors		684,447		
PTI gain from PML(N)				

The PTI gain is recorded on the basis that PML-N had held both predecessor constituencies, NA-102 and NA-103, before the 2018 delimitation.

== 2024 general election ==
General elections were held on 8 February 2024. Aneeqa Mehdi, standing as an independent candidate with PTI affiliation, won the seat with 211,044 votes.

General election 2024: NA-67 Hafizabad
Party	Candidate	Votes	%	±%
PTI	Aneeqa Mehdi	211,044	47.02	▲6.10
PML(N)	Saira Afzal Tarar	183,947	40.98	▲2.08
TLP	Syed Atta ul Hasnain	25,722	5.73	▼5.17
Others	Others (nineteen candidates)	28,155	7.59	
Turnout		462,245	57.02	▼2.11
Total valid votes		448,868	97.11	
Rejected ballots		13,377	2.89	
Majority		27,097	6.04	▲4.02
Registered electors		810,723		

== See also ==
- NA-66 Wazirabad
- NA-68 Mandi Bahauddin-I
