= Rata Dhotharan =

Rata Dhotharan is a village in Hafizabad District, Punjab, Pakistan. The population mainly consists of Dhothar Jatts.
