= Health Secretary =

Health secretary can refer to:

- Cabinet Secretary for Health and Social Care, Scotland
- Health Secretary of Pakistan
- Secretary of State for Health and Social Care, United Kingdom
- United States Secretary of Health and Human Services
- Health Secretary, an executive position in the Ministry of Health and Family Welfare of India

== See also ==
- Minister of health
- Ministry of Health (disambiguation)
