= Shahid Hussain Bhatti =

Pakistani politician

- شاہد حسین بھٹی

Member of the Provincial Assembly of Punjab
- Incumbent
- Assumed office 24 February 2024
- Constituency: PP-37 Hafizabad-I

Member of the National Assembly of Pakistan
- In office 16 September 2013 – 31 May 2018
- Constituency: NA-103 (Hafizabad-II)

Personal details
- Party: PMLN (2008-present)

Shahid Hussain Bhatti (Urdu: شاہد حسین بھٹی) is a Pakistani politician who was a member of the National Assembly of Pakistan from September 2013 to May 2018.

== Political career ==
He ran for the seat of the National Assembly of Pakistan as a candidate of Pakistan Muslim League (N) (PML-N) from Constituency NA-103 (Hafizabad-II) in the 2008 Pakistani general election, but lost the seat to Liaqat Abbas Bhatti.

He was elected to the National Assembly as a candidate of PML-N from Constituency NA-103 (Hafizabad-II) in by-elections held in August 2013.
