= Attaullah Tarar =

Pakistani politician

- عطاء اللہ تارڑ
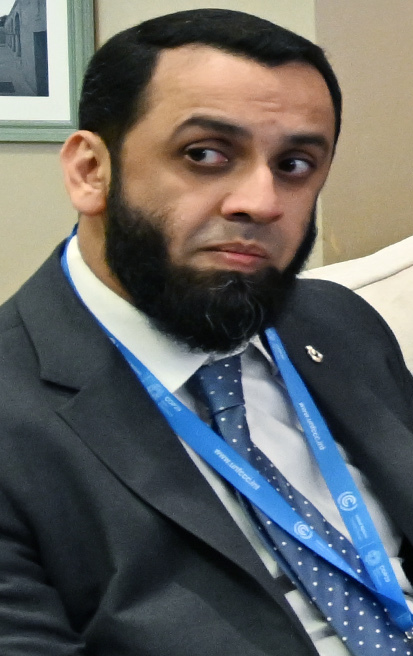

Federal Minister for Information and Broadcasting
- Incumbent
- Assumed office 11 March 2024
- President: Asif Ali Zardari
- Prime Minister: Shehbaz Sharif
- Preceded by: Murtaza Solangi (caretaker)

Federal Minister for National Heritage and Culture
- In office 17 May 2024 – 7 March 2025
- President: Asif Ali Zardari
- Prime Minister: Shehbaz Sharif
- Preceded by: Amir Muqam
- Succeeded by: Aurangzeb Khan Khichi

Member of the National Assembly of Pakistan
- Incumbent
- Assumed office 29 February 2024
- Constituency: NA-127 Lahore-XI

Special Assistant to the Prime Minister on Interior and Legal Affairs
- In office 16 December 2022 – 10 August 2023
- Prime Minister: Shehbaz Sharif

Special Assistant to the Prime Minister
- In office 28 July 2022 – 16 December 2022
- Prime Minister: Shehbaz Sharif

Home Minister of Punjab
- In office 30 May 2022 – 26 July 2022

Spokesperson of the Government of Punjab
- In office 24 May 2022 – 26 July 2022

Personal details
- Born: Lahore, Punjab, Pakistan
- Party: PMLN (2022-present)
- Relations: Muhammad Rafiq Tarar (grandfather); Saira Afzal Tarar (aunt); Bilal Farooq Tarar (brother)

Attaullah Tarar (Urdu/Punjabi: عطاء اللہ تارڑ) is a Pakistani politician who is the current Federal Minister for Information and Broadcasting, in office since 11 March 2024. He has been a Member of the National Assembly of Pakistan since February 2024.

Hailing from a family considered as loyalist of the Pakistan Muslim League (N), Tarar has held the position of Deputy Secretary-General of the PML-N and has previously served as an additional secretary.

== Early life and education ==
Born into a Punjabi Jat family, his grandfather was Muhammad Rafiq Tarar, a Supreme Court judge and a PML-N politician who served as the President of Pakistan from 1998 to 2001. His brother Bilal Farooq Tarar is also a politician.

He received an LLB (Hons) degree from the University of London. Following his studies, and like his grandfather and his father, he would practice law before entering politics.

== Political career ==
On 24 May 2022, Chief Minister of Punjab Hamza Shahbaz appointed him as the spokesperson of the Government of Punjab, on an honorary and non-remunerative basis. On May 30, 2022, Tarar was appointed as the Home Minister in the shortlived cabinet of Punjab Chief Minister Hamza Shahbaz.

On July 28, 2022, he was appointed as the Special Assistant to Prime Minister Shehbaz Sharif, with the status of a Federal Minister. On December 16, 2022, Prime Minister Shehbaz Sharif appointed Tarar as his special assistant on interior and legal affairs.

Following the May 9 riots, he held frequent media interactions, criticizing PTI founder Imran Khan.

He was elected to the National Assembly of Pakistan as a candidate of PML-N from Constituency NA-127 Lahore-XI in 2024 Pakistani general election. He received 98,210 votes and defeated PTI-backed independent candidate Malik Zaheer Abbas who received 82,230 votes and also Bilawal Bhutto Zardari who received 15,005 votes. However, Malik Zaheer Abbas contested Tarar's election victory in court, accusing the Election Commission of Pakistan of manipulating and forging Forms 45 and 47 to declare Tarar the winning candidate.

On 11 March, he was inducted into the federal cabinet of Prime Minister Shehbaz Sharif and was appointed as Federal Minister for Information and Broadcasting. On May 17, 2024 Tarar was assigned additional portfolio of National Heritage and Culture.

== Controversies ==
=== Allegations of threat and intimidation against a PPP candidate (2021) ===
In December 2021, a First Information Report (FIR) was filed against Tarar after he, along with a mob of armed individuals, forcibly entered the residence of Syed Mir Wasiq, a candidate of Pakistan Peoples Party (PPP) during the by-election in Khanewal. Allegations were made that Tarar threatened, intimidated, and harassed women and family members of Wasiq.

=== Controversy over middle finger gesture and apology in Punjab Assembly (2022) ===
In June 2022, he faced criticism on social media after a video of him went viral, wherein he was observed displaying the middle finger in the Punjab Assembly, while holding a copy of the Constitution. After facing criticism on social media for allegedly showing disrespect towards the Constitution and violating the decorum of the Assembly, Atta posted an "apology".

=== Issuance of legal notice over defamatory remarks (2022) ===
In 2022, Farah Khan, a friend of Bushra Bibi, issued a final legal notice to Tarar, asking him to stop making defamatory statements about her.

=== Criticism over acting as personal photographer during Iran visit (2024) ===
In May 2024, during Shehbaz Sharif's visit to Iran, Tarar, acted as his personal photographer upon landing at the airport, which prompted criticism from the public.

=== Allegations of violent crackdowns on PTI protestors (2024) ===
In November 2024, during the PTI protest march towards Islamabad’s D Chowk, Federal Minister for Information and Broadcasting, Attaullah Tarar, publicly stated that military force could be used to prevent the march, which aimed to demand the release of Imran Khan. His remarks were later acknowledged by PMLN figures, such as Mohsin Naqvi, suggesting their involvement in the response.

Reports from the event indicated the use of military-grade weapons, including American-made sniper rifles and automatic guns, leading to claims of approximately 14 civilian fatalities, as well as the deaths of 4 military security personnel. In addition to these casualties, there were allegations of numerous abductions, with a list of over a hundred missing individuals compiled by various sources. The crackdown, which took place in the early hours, was accompanied by the shutdown of internet and mobile services, and reports indicated that lights at D Chowk were turned off during the operation.

Government officials denied the use of live ammunition and maintained that order was restored, while PTI leaders condemned the response as excessive, describing it as a “massacre.” There were also claims of efforts to cover up evidence during the night, with some suggesting that authorities took steps to suppress documentation of the events. The exact number of casualties remains disputed, with the government challenging PTI’s claims and calling for proof.

=== Controversial remarks during the India-Pakistan crisis (2025) ===
On 7 May 2025, amid the India-Pakistan crisis, the Federal Minister for Information and Broadcasting, Attaullah Tarar, while speaking at Pak-China Friendship Centre in Islamabad, claimed that India had conceded defeated by hoisting white flag at the Line of Control. Some media houses from Pakistan like Samaa TV even claimed that the white flag was hoisted at 'Chora Complex'. However, there was no digital footprint of any 'Chora Complex' along the border within India. This was described by Indian media as a "bizarre misinformation campaign." According to Indian media, there was no concrete evidence suggesting that the visuals came from the Line of Control and there were no international news reports on it either. The conflict pressed on until 10 May culminating in the 2025 India-Pakistan ceasefire agreement.
