= COVID-19 pandemic in Western Sahara =

- Disease: COVID-19
- Pathogen: SARS-CoV-2
- Location: Western Sahara
- First outbreak: Wuhan, Hubei, China
- Index case: Boujdour
- Arrival date: 4 April 2020 (4 weeks)
- Confirmed cases: 766
- Active cases: 41
- Recovered: 25
- Deaths: 2

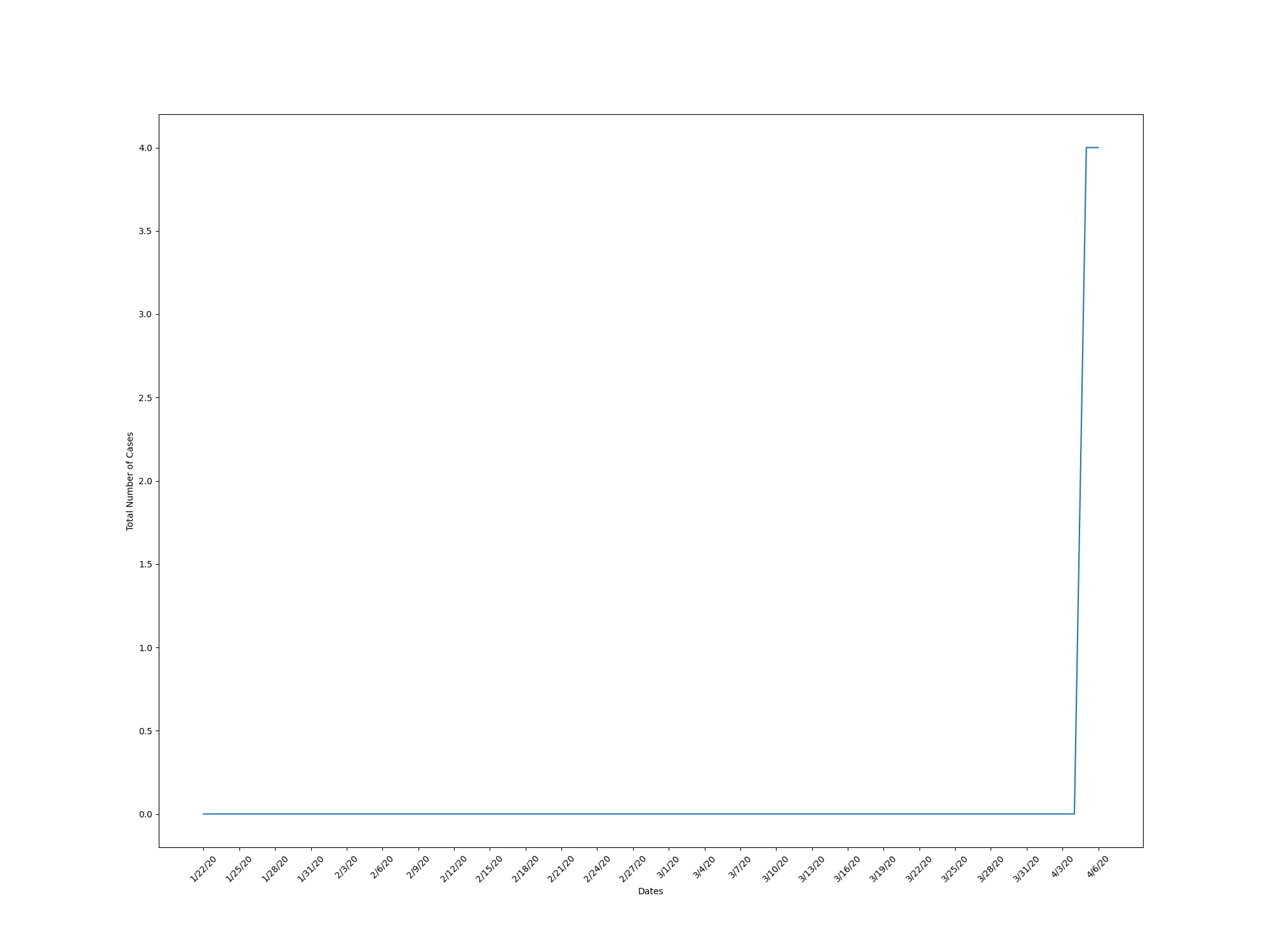
COVID 19 confirmed Cases in Western Sahara

The COVID-19 pandemic reached Western Sahara in April 2020. Due to the territory's disputed status, available data was reported primarily by Moroccan authorities and the United Nations Mission for the Referendum in Western Sahara (MINURSO), and generally excluded areas controlled by the Sahrawi Arab Democratic Republic.

== Background ==
On 12 January 2020, the World Health Organization (WHO) confirmed that a novel coronavirus was the cause of a respiratory illness in a cluster of people in Wuhan City, Hubei Province, China, which was reported to the WHO on 31 December 2019.

The case fatality ratio for COVID-19 has been much lower than SARS of 2003, but the transmission has been significantly greater, with a significant total death toll.

== Timeline ==
On 4 April, the first four cases were confirmed in Boujdour by the United Nations Mission for the Referendum in Western Sahara (MINURSO).

On 9 April, MINURSO reported that two new cases were confirmed in Dakhla, bringing the number of confirmed cases to six.

On 24 April, MINURSO reported four more cases, bringing the number of confirmed cases to ten.

By 19 June there had been 26 confirmed cases, the latest of which in Laayoune. One patient had died (in Tindouf, 24 May) while 23 had recovered and 2 were still active cases.

On 31 August there were 41 active cases in Laayoune.

== See also ==
- COVID-19 pandemic in Africa
- COVID-19 pandemic in the Sahrawi Arab Democratic Republic
