= Aneeqa Mehdi =

Pakistani politician

Aneeqa Mehdi Bhatti

Member of the National Assembly of Pakistan
- Incumbent
- Assumed office 29 February 2024
- Constituency: NA-67 Hafizabad

Personal details
- Party: PTI (2024-present)
- Relations: Shaukat Ali Bhatti (brother)
- Parent: Mehdi Hassan Bhatti (father)

Aneeqa Mehdi Bhatti is a Pakistani politician who has been a member of the National Assembly of Pakistan since February 2024.

== Political career ==
She was elected to the National Assembly of Pakistan in the 2024 Pakistani general election from NA-67 Hafizabad as an independent candidate, defeating Saira Afzal Tarar of the Pakistan Muslim League (N).

She later joined the Sunni Ittehad Council (SIC), along with all of the other PTI-affiliated independents.

== Personal life ==
Her father Mehdi Hassan Bhatti is a former MNA and her brother Shaukat Ali Bhatti served as the Minister of Culture and Youth Affairs in the government of Chaudhry Pervaiz Elahi in Punjab.
