= Constituency NA-102 =

Former constituency of the National Assembly of Pakistan

Constituency NA-102 (Hafizabad-I)
- Former constituency for the National Assembly of Pakistan
- Region: Hafizabad District

Former constituency
- Created: 2002
- Abolished: 2018
- Replaced by: Constituency NA-87 (Hafizabad)

Constituency NA-102 (Hafizabad-I) (Urdu: این اے-۱۰٢، حافظ آباد-۱) was a constituency for the National Assembly of Pakistan. It was one of the two constituencies for the district of Hafizabad before the 2018 delimitations. After the delimitations, the two constituencies were merged into one: NA-87.

== Election 2002 ==
General elections were held on 10 Oct 2002. Chaudhry Mehdi Hasan Bhatti of PML-Q won by 50,824 votes.

General election 2002: NA-102 Hafizabad-I
Party	Candidate	Votes	%	±%
PML(Q)	Ch. Mehdi Hasan Bhatti	50,824	45.87	
PML(N)	Muhammad Usman Tarar	43,218	39.01	
PPP	Ahmad Bilal Tarar	15,079	13.61	
Others	Others (two candidates)	1,669	1.51	
Turnout		114,784	51.78	
Total valid votes		110,790	96.52	
Rejected ballots		3,994	3.48	
Majority		7,606	6.86	
Registered electors		221,662		

== Election 2008 ==
General elections were held on 18 Feb 2008. Saira Afzal Tarar of PML-N won by 56,313 votes.

General election 2008: NA-102 Hafizabad-I
Party	Candidate	Votes	%	±%
PML(N)	Saira Afzal Tarar	56,313	46.66	
PML(Q)	Ch. Shoukat Ali Bhatti	42,808	35.47	
PPP	Malik Shoukat Hayyat Awan	21,567	17.87	
Turnout		125,244	61.20	
Total valid votes		120,688	96.36	
Rejected ballots		4,556	3.64	
Majority		13,505	11.19	
Registered electors		204,649		

== Election 2013 ==
General elections were held on 11 May 2013. Saira Afzal Tarar of PML-N won by 93,691 votes and became the member of National Assembly.

General election 2013: NA-102 Hafizabad-I
Party	Candidate	Votes	%	±%
PML(N)	Saira Afzal Tarar	93,691	53.90	
Independent	Ch. Shoukat Ali Bhatti	67,625	38.91	
PTI	Riaz Ahmad Tarar	5,653	3.25	
PPP	Hajan Allah Rakhi	3,566	2.05	
Others	Others (seven candidates)	3,276	1.89	
Turnout		178,109	62.62	
Total valid votes		173,811	97.59	
Rejected ballots		4,298	2.41	
Majority		26,066	14.99	
Registered electors		284,417		
