= Drug Regulatory Authority of Pakistan =

Drug regulator agency in Pakistan

Drug Regulatory Authority of Pakistan (DRAP)
- Abbreviation: DRAP
- Formation: 2012
- Established: 12-November-2012
- Type: Autonomous body under Federal Government in Pakistan
- Legal status: Authority
- Headquarters: Islamabad, Pakistan
- Region served: Pakistan
- Official language: Urdu, English
- Chief Executive Officer: Dr. Obaidullah
- Main organ: Policy Board
- Parent organization: Ministry of National Health Services, Regulations & Coordination
- Website: www.dra.gov.pk

The Drug Regulatory Authority of Pakistan (DRAP) is a self-governing entity under the Federal Government of Pakistan. It functions under the administrative supervision of the Ministry of National Health Services, Regulations & Coordination. DRAP was formed in accordance with the DRAP Act 2012 and is tasked with ensuring effective coordination and implementation of The Drugs Act, 1976.

The Drug Regulatory Authority of Pakistan safeguards the health of ~257 million nationals; regulates the Therapeutic Goods market exceeding PKRs 1.5 trillion and exports ~$1billion annually. The Authority oversees ~1380 Therapeutic Goods manufacturers (i.e. Pharmaceuticals and Biologicals ~710, Health and Alternative Products ~570, Medical Devices~100) ~2500 importers and distributors for regulatory compliance. Established after the promulgation of the DRAP Act 2012 as an autonomous federal authority, DRAP operates through an inclusive approach with provincial representation engrained in DRAP’s governance and statutory bodies including Policy Board, Appellate Board, Registration and Central Licensing Boards. This approach ensures national and subnational harmonization and inclusive decision-making.

== Organizational Structure ==
The operational infrastructure supporting DRAP’s functions comprises its headquarters in Islamabad, regional field offices established in each provincial capital, performing active surveillance for the product life cycle through coordinated activities with Law-Enforcement Agencies and respective provincials and state drug control administrations.

== Role and responsibilities ==
DRAP is committed to ensuring that all drugs, medical devices, cosmetics, alternative medicines, and health products meet a certain standard of quality and are safe and effective for use. It is responsible for making sure that therapeutic goods, which are approved and available in the market, comply with the prescribed standards of quality, safety, and efficacy. The regulatory tasks carried out by DRAP encompass registration and marketing authorization, vigilance, market surveillance and control, licensing establishments, regulatory inspection, laboratory testing, clinical trials oversight, pharmacovigilance, and lot release of biologicals.

== Initiatives ==
=== Response to the shortage of medicines ===
In response to the shortage of life-saving medicines across the country, DRAP has taken several initiatives:

DRAP has set the maximum retail prices for 25 life-saving drugs and 25 newly introduced medicines in an effort to make these essential drugs more affordable for the public.

A committee was formed to propose strategies to alleviate the scarcity of life-saving medicines and liaise with pharmaceutical manufacturers and importers.

=== DRAP App ===
In an effort to eradicate black market practices and put an end to hoarding, DRAP introduced a mobile application. This app provides real-time and evidence-based information about drug shortages in the market.

=== Importing Indian drugs ===
There is no restriction on hospitals or individuals on importing vital medicines from India for their own use under the Import Policy Order 2022 after obtaining a No Objection Certificate (NOC) from DRAP.

=== Crackdown on spurious medicines ===
DRAP decided to launch a crackdown against spurious medicines to eradicate the menace of unregistered, spurious and sub-standard medicine.
