= Mukhtar Bhatti =

Pakistani hockey player (born 1932)

Personal information
- Nationality: Pakistani
- Born: October 1932 Gurdaspur, British India
- Died: before 1997

Sport
- Sport: Field hockey

Mukhtar Bhatti (October 1932 – before 1997) was a Pakistani field hockey player. He competed in the men's tournament at the 1948 Summer Olympics, where the Pakistan hockey team finished fourth in the nation's inaugural Olympics appearance.
