= Constituency NA-103 =

Former constituency of the National Assembly of Pakistan

Constituency NA-103 (Hafizabad-II)
- Former constituency for the National Assembly of Pakistan
- Region: Hafizabad District

Former constituency
- Created: 2002
- Abolished: 2018
- Replaced by: Constituency NA-87 (Hafizabad)

Constituency NA-103 (Hafizabad-II) (Urdu: این اے-۱۰۳، حافظ آباد-٢) was a constituency for the National Assembly of Pakistan. It was one of the two constituencies for the district of Hafizabad before the 2018 delimitations. After the delimitations, the two constituencies were merged into one: NA-87.

== Election 2002 ==
General elections were held on 10 Oct 2002. Chaudhry Liaqat Abbas Bhatti of PML-Q won by 67,626 votes.

General election 2002: NA-103 Hafizabad-II
Party	Candidate	Votes	%	±%
PML(Q)	Choudhary Liaqat Abbas Bhatti	67,626	60.46	
Independent	Ch. Sarfraz Khan Bhatti	42,990	38.44	
PTI	Mian Akhtar Hussain Khan Bhatti	1,229	1.10	
Turnout		115,347	55.86	
Total valid votes		111,845	96.96	
Rejected ballots		3,502	3.04	
Majority		24,636	22.02	
Registered electors		206,486		

== Election 2008 ==
General elections were held on 18 Feb 2008. Chaudhry Liaqat Abbas Bhatti of PML-Q won by 56,791 votes.

General election 2008: NA-103 Hafizabad-II
Party	Candidate	Votes	%	±%
PML(Q)	Choudhary Liaqat Abbas Bhatti	56,791	46.79	
PML(N)	Mian Shahid Hussain Khan	54,411	44.83	
PPP	Mushtaq Ahmad Mohal	10,181	8.38	
Turnout		125,483	63.37	
Total valid votes		121,383	96.73	
Rejected ballots		4,100	3.27	
Majority		2,380	1.96	
Registered electors		198,007		

== Election 2013 ==
General elections were held on 11 May 2013. Choudhary Liaqat Abbas Bhatti Independent won and became the member of National Assembly.

General election 2013: NA-103 Hafizabad-II
Party	Candidate	Votes	%	±%
Independent	Choudhary Liaqat Abbas Bhatti	76,199	46.82	
PML(N)	Mian Shahid Hussain khan Bhatti	75,877	46.63	
PTI	Akhtar Hussain Bhatti	4,454	2.74	
Others	Others (nine candidates)	6,208	3.81	
Turnout		165,135	63.70	
Total valid votes		162,738	98.55	
Rejected ballots		2,397	1.45	
Majority		322	0.19	
Registered electors		259,256		

== By-Election 2013 ==
By-Election 2013: NA-103 Hafizabad-II
Party	Candidate	Votes	%	±%
PML(N)	Mian Shahid Hussain Khan	78,113	53.37	
PTI	Ch. Shoukat Ali Bhatti	67,072	45.82	
Others	Others (five candidates)	1,183	0.81	
Turnout		148,218	57.10	
Total valid votes		146,368	98.75	
Rejected ballots		1,850	1.25	
Majority		11,041	7.55	
Registered electors		259,584		
