= Parveen Masood Bhatti =

Pakistani politician

Member of the National Assembly of Pakistan
- In office 17 March 2008 – 31 May 2018
- Constituency: Reserved seat for women

Personal details
- Party: Pakistan Muslim League (N)

Parveen Masood Bhatti (Urdu: پروین مسعود بھٹی) is a Pakistani politician who had been a member of the National Assembly of Pakistan, from March 2008 to May 2018.

== Political career ==
She was elected as a member of the Provincial Assembly of Punjab as a candidate of Pakistan Muslim League (N) on a reserved seat for women in the 2002 Pakistani general election.

She was elected to the National Assembly of Pakistan as a candidate of Pakistan Muslim League (N) on a seat reserved for women from Punjab in the 2008 Pakistani general election.

She was re-elected to the National Assembly of Pakistan as a candidate of Pakistan Muslim League (N) on a reserved seat for women from Punjab in the 2013 Pakistani general election.
