= PP-39 Hafizabad-III =

Constituency of Punjab, Pakistan

- Constituency for the Provincial Assembly of Punjab
- Region: Pindi Bhattian Tehsil (partly) including Pindi Bhattian city of Hafizabad District

Current constituency
- Created from: PP-107 Hafizabad-III (2002-2018); PP-71 Hafizabad-III (2018-2023)

PP-39 Hafizabad-III (پی پی-39، حافظ آباد-3) is a Constituency of Provincial Assembly of Punjab.

== General elections 2024 ==
Provincial election 2024: PP-39 Hafizabad-III
Party	Candidate	Votes	%	±%
PML(N)	Muhammad Aoun Jahangir	41,874	28.57	
Independent	Qamar Javed (Note: Filed nomination papers as PTI candidate but ECP allowed him to run as an Independent)	37,037	25.27	
Independent	Liaqat Abbas	29,528	20.15	
Independent	Rai Zameer UI Haq	24,061	16.42	
TLP	Khurram Shahzad	10,299	7.03	
Others	Others (eleven candidates)	3,779	2.56	
Turnout		151,553	58.26	
Total valid votes		146,578	96.72	
Rejected ballots		4,975	3.28	
Majority		4,837	3.30	
Registered electors		260,124		
hold				

== General elections 2018 ==
Provincial election 2018: PP-71 Hafizabad-III
Party	Candidate	Votes	%	±%
PTI	Muhammad Ahsan Jahangir	47,892	37.01	
TLP	Syed Shoaib Shahnawaz	31,058	24.00	
PML(N)	Shoaib Shafiq	28,717	22.19	
Independent	Shahid Abbas	14,951	11.55	
Independent	Syed Muhammad Ali Shah Gilani	2,124	1.64	
Independent	Ch. Liaqat Abbas Bhatti	1,634	1.26	
Others	Others (nine candidates)	3,029	2.35	
Turnout		133,762	60.02	
Total valid votes		129,405	96.74	
Rejected ballots		4,357	3.26	
Majority		16,834	13.01	
Registered electors		222,846		

== General elections 2013 ==
Provincial election 2013: PP-107 Hafizabad-III
Party	Candidate	Votes	%	±%
Independent	Syed Shoaib Shah Nawaz	51,961	48.02	
PML(N)	Nighat Intisar	48,272	44.61	
PTI	Sobia Saif Bhatti	3,271	3.02	
Independent	Muhammad Razaq	1,047	0.97	
Others	Others (fifteen candidates)	3,648	3.37	
Turnout		111,047	63.95	
Total valid votes		108,199	97.44	
Rejected ballots		2,848	2.56	
Majority		3,689	3.41	
Registered electors		173,660		

== General elections 2008 ==
Provincial election 2008: PP-107 Hafizabad-III
Party	Candidate	Votes	%	±%
PML(Q)	Ch. Liaqat Abbas Bhatti	35,398	45.83	
Independent	Mian Nazam Abbas Bhatti	33,555	43.44	
PPP	Rai Muhammad Ishaq	7,776	10.07	
Independent	Mohtarma Sobia Bhatti	158	0.20	
Independent	Zulfiqar Ali Bhatti	108	0.14	
Independent	Rai Haq Nawaz	78	0.10	
Independent	Mian Asad Abbas Bhatti	66	0.09	
Independent	Ch. Qaqmar Javed Gujjar	64	0.08	
Independent	Sardar Babar Sohail Gujjar	35	0.05	
Turnout		79,931	61.96	
Total valid votes		77,238	96.63	
Rejected ballots		2,693	3.37	
Majority		1,843	2.39	
Registered electors		129,005		

== See also ==
- PP-38 Hafizabad-II
- PP-40 Mandi Bahauddin-I
