= Mamoon Jaffar Tarar =

Pakistani politician

Member of the Provincial Assembly of the Punjab
- In office 15 August 2018 – 17 January 2023
- Constituency: PP-69 Hafizabad-I

Personal details
- Party: IPP (2023–present)
- Other political affiliations: PTI (2018–2023)

Muhammad Mamoon Tarar is a Pakistani politician who had been a member of the Provincial Assembly of the Punjab from August 2018 till January 2023.
