= Jalalpur Bhattian =

City in Hafizabad District, Punjab, Pakistan

Jalalpur Bhattian جلال پوربھٹیاں
- City
- Location on Hafizabad road from Pindi Bhattian
- Coordinates: 32°03′52″N 73°22′37″E
- Country: Pakistan
- Province: Punjab
- District: Hafizabad District
- Division: Gujranwala Division

Government

Population (2017 census)
  - Total: 40,897
- Postal code: 52170
- Area code: 0547

Jalalpur Bhattian (Urdu: جلال پُور بهٹياں) is a city in Hafizabad District of Punjab, Pakistan. Jalalpur Bhattian is located 5 kilometres (3.1 mi) southeast of the Chenab River & 30.6 kilometres (19.0 mi) southwest of the Hafizabad and 96.2 kilometres (59.8 mi) by road northeast of Faisalabad.
