= Nighat Intisar Bhatti =

Pakistani politician

Member of the Provincial Assembly of the Punjab
- In office May 2014 – 31 May 2018
- Constituency: PP-107 (Hafizabad-III)

Personal details
- Born: 1 January 1966 Pindi Bhattian
- Party: PTI (2013-present)

Nighat Intisar Bhatti (Urdu: نگہت انتصار بھٹی; born 1 January 1966) is a Pakistani politician who had been a Member of the Provincial Assembly of the Punjab, from May 2014 to May 2018.

== Early life ==
She was born on 1 January 1966 in Pindi Bhattian.

== Political career ==
She ran for the seat of the Provincial Assembly of the Punjab as a candidate for Pakistan Muslim League (N) (PML-N) for Constituency PP-107 (Hafizabad-III) in the 2013 Pakistani general election but was unsuccessful. She received 48,272 votes and lost the seat to an independent candidate Syed Shoaib Shah Nawaz.

She was elected to the Provincial Assembly of the Punjab as a candidate for Pakistan Tehreek-e-Insaf (PTI) for Constituency PP-107 (Hafizabad-III) in by-polls held in May 2014. She received 44,033 votes and defeated Sarfraz Khan Bhatti, a candidate of PML-N.
