= COVID-19 pandemic in the Sahrawi Arab Democratic Republic =

- Disease: COVID-19
- Pathogen: SARS-CoV-2
- Location: Sahrawi Arab Democratic Republic
- Arrival date: 25 July 2020 (5 years, 9 months, 3 weeks and 2 days)
- Confirmed cases: 2154 (as of 19 June 2023)
- Recovered: 2064
- Deaths: 90

The COVID-19 pandemic was confirmed to have reached the Sahrawi Arab Democratic Republic in July 2020. As of 19 June 2023, there are 2154 confirmed cases, of which 2064 have fully recovered, and the deaths have reached 90.

== Background ==
On 12 January 2020, the World Health Organization (WHO) confirmed that a novel coronavirus was the cause of a respiratory illness in a cluster of people in Wuhan City, Hubei Province, China, which was reported to the WHO on 31 December 2019.

The case fatality ratio for COVID-19 has been much lower than SARS of 2003, but the transmission has been significantly greater, with a significant total death toll.

== Timeline ==
=== January to June 2020 ===
On 19 March, the Polisario Front government of the Sahrawi Arab Democratic Republic closed the borders with Algeria and Mauritania as a preventative measure.

=== July to December 2020 ===
On 25 July, the first four cases were confirmed.

In the week 28 July–4 August one more case was reported. Three patients had recovered.

In the week 4–11 August nine more cases and one more death were reported, bringing the death toll to 2. The total number of recovered patients increased to 5.

In the week 11–18 August five more cases were reported. The death toll remained unchanged. The total number of recovered patients increased to 13.

In the week 18–25 August six more cases were reported, bringing the total number of confirmed cases to 25. The death toll remained unchanged.

From 25 August to 22 September no new cases or deaths were reported.

In the week 23–29 September three more cases were reported, bringing the total number of confirmed cases to 28. The death toll remained unchanged.

From 29 September to 13 December no new cases or deaths were reported.

In the week 14–20 December two more cases were reported, bringing the total number of confirmed cases to 30. The death toll rose to 3.

In the week 21–27 December one more case was reported, taking the total number of confirmed cases to 31.

From 27 December to 3 January three more cases were reported, taking the total number of confirmed cases to 34.

=== January to June 2021 ===
From 4 to 10 January no new cases were reported but the death toll rose to 4.

In the week 11–17 January no new cases or deaths were reported.

In the week 18–24 January five more cases were reported, taking the total number of confirmed cases to 39. The death toll rose to 6.

In the week 25–31 January one more case was reported, taking the total number of confirmed cases to 40. The death toll remained unchanged.

In the week 1–7 February one more case was reported, taking the total number of confirmed cases to 41. The death toll rose to 7.

In the week 8–14 February no new cases or deaths were reported.

In the week 15–21 February one more case was reported, taking the total number of confirmed cases to 42. The death toll remained unchanged.

From 22 February to 14 March no new cases or deaths were reported.

In the week 15–21 March 20 more cases were reported, taking the total number of confirmed cases to 62. The death toll remained unchanged.

In the week 22–28 March the number of confirmed cases nearly doubled, to 123. The death toll rose to 9.

From 29 March to 4 April there were 112 new cases, taking the total number of confirmed cases to 235. The death toll rose to 12.

In the week 5–11 April 167 more cases were reported, taking the total number of confirmed cases to 402. The death toll doubled to 24.

In the week 12–18 April 103 more cases were reported, taking the total number of confirmed cases to 505. The death toll rose to 29.

In the week 19–25 April 62 more cases were reported, taking the total number of confirmed cases to 567. The death toll rose to 32.

On 22 April it was announced that Polisario leader Brahim Ghali was being treated in Spain for COVID-19. The hospitalization led to increased tensions in Morocco–Spain relations, including Morocco relaxing its border controls with Ceuta resulting in an influx of thousands of migrants.

From 26 April to 2 May there were 102 new cases, taking the total number of confirmed cases to 669. The death toll rose to 39.

In the week 3–9 May 52 more cases were reported, taking the total number of confirmed cases to 721. The death toll rose to 41.

In the week 10–16 May eleven more cases were reported, taking the total number of confirmed cases to 732. The death toll rose to 42.

In the week 17–23 May five more cases were reported, taking the total number of confirmed cases to 737. The death toll rose to 45.

In the week 24–30 May five more cases were reported, taking the total number of confirmed cases to 742. The death toll rose to 46.

From 31 May to 30 June no reports were submitted by the Sahrawi authorities.

=== July to December 2021 ===
From 1 to 11 July twelve more cases were reported, taking the total number of confirmed cases to 754. The death toll remained unchanged.

In the week 12–18 July, 41 more cases were reported, taking the total number of confirmed cases to 795. The death toll rose to 47.

In the week 19–25 July, 37 more cases were reported, taking the total number of confirmed cases to 832. The death toll remained unchanged.

From 26 July to 1 August, 250 more cases were reported, taking the total number of confirmed cases to 1082. The death toll rose to 52.

In the week 2–8 August, 237 more cases were reported, taking the total number of confirmed cases to 1319. The death toll rose to 60.

In the week 9–15 August, 141 more cases were reported, taking the total number of confirmed cases to 1460. The death toll rose to 63.

In the week 16–22 August, 142 more cases were reported, taking the total number of confirmed cases to 1602. The death toll rose to 65.

In the week 23–29 August, 41 more cases were reported, taking the total number of confirmed cases to 1643. The death toll rose to 66.

From 30 August to 5 September, 58 more cases were reported, bringing the total number of confirmed cases to 1701. The death toll rose to 67.

From 6 to 13 September no more cases or deaths were reported.

In the week 13–19 September, 23 more cases were reported, taking the total number of confirmed cases to 1724. The death toll rose to 68.

In the week 20–26 September, 24 more cases were reported, taking the total number of confirmed cases to 1748. The death toll rose to 69.

From 27 September to 3 October no more cases or deaths were reported.

In the week 4–10 October, three more cases were reported, taking the total number of confirmed cases to 1751. The death toll remained unchanged.

In the week 11–17 October, four more cases were reported, taking the total number of confirmed cases to 1755. The death toll remained unchanged.

From 18 October to 12 December, no more cases or deaths were reported.

In the week 13–19 December, 66 more cases were reported, taking the total number of confirmed cases to 1821. The death toll rose to 77.

From 20 to 26 December, no more cases or deaths were reported.

From 27 December to 2 January, 50 more cases or deaths were reported, taking the total number of confirmed cases to 1871. The death toll rose to 78.

=== January to June 2022 ===
From 3 to 9 January, no new cases or deaths were reported.

In the week 10–16 January, 36 more cases were reported, taking the total number of confirmed cases to 1907. The death toll rose to 79.

From 17 to 23 January, no new cases or deaths were reported.

In the week 24–30 January, 50 more cases were reported, taking the total number of confirmed cases to 1957. The death toll rose to 84.

From 31 January to 6 March, no new cases or deaths were reported.

In the week 7–13 March, 83 more cases were reported, taking the total number of confirmed cases to 2040. The death toll rose to 90.

From 14 March to 30 June, no new cases or deaths were reported.

=== July to December 2022 ===
From 1 to 24 July, no new cases or deaths were reported.

In the week 25–31 July, seven more cases were reported, taking the total number of confirmed cases to 2047. The death toll remained unchanged.

In the week 1–7 August, 33 more cases were reported, taking the total number of confirmed cases to 2080. The death toll remained unchanged.

In the week 8–14 August, 54 more cases were reported, taking the total number of confirmed cases to 2134. The death toll remained unchanged.

In the week 15–21 August, 10 more cases were reported, taking the total number of confirmed cases to 2144. The death toll remained unchanged.

In the week 22–28 August, three more cases were reported, taking the total number of confirmed cases to 2147. The death toll remained unchanged.

From 29 August to 4 September, no new cases or deaths were reported.

In the week 5–11 September, one more case was reported, taking the total number of confirmed cases to 2148. The death toll remained unchanged.

From 12 September to 31 December, no new cases or deaths were reported.

=== January to June 2023 ===
From January to April, no new cases or deaths were reported.

== See also ==
- COVID-19 pandemic in Western Sahara
