= Bilal Farooq Tarar =

Pakistani politician

Member of the National Assembly of Pakistan
- Incumbent
- Assumed office 27 November 2025
- Constituency: NA-66 Wazirabad

Member of the Provincial Assembly of the Punjab
- In office 15 August 2018 – 14 January 2023
- Constituency: PP-53 Gujranwala-III

Personal details
- Born: 20 December 1987 (age 38) Lahore, Punjab, Pakistan
- Party: PMLN (2018-present)
- Relatives: Muhammad Rafiq Tarar (grandfather); Saira Afzal Tarar (aunt); Attaullah Tarar (brother)
- Occupation: Lawyer; Lecturer; Politician

Bilal Farooq Tarar (born 20 December 1987) is a Pakistani politician who was elected unopposed as Member of the National Assembly of Pakistan from NA-66 Wazirabad on 8-11-25 and took oath of office on 10-11-25. Earlier he has served as a Member of the Provincial Assembly of the Punjab from August 2018 till January 2023.

By profession he's a lawyer and a lecturer.

== Early life ==
He was born on 20 December 1987 in Lahore into a Punjabi Jat family of the Tarar clan to Muhammad Farooq Tarar. His grandfather Muhammad Rafiq Tarar, his aunt Saira Afzal Tarar and his elder brother Attaullah Tarar have all been involved into politics.

== Academic career ==
He has earned his Master of Law (LL.M.) degree in 2012 from SOAS University of London, UK and has served as Lecturer at the Universal College Lahore (UoL) from 2013 to 2018.

== Political career ==
He was elected to the Provincial Assembly of the Punjab as a candidate of Pakistan Muslim League (N) from Constituency PP-53 (Gujranwala-III) in the 2018 Pakistani general election.
