= Javed Bhatti =

Pakistani cricketer

Cricket information
- Batting: Right-handed
- Bowling: Right-arm leg-spin

Domestic team information
- Years: Team
- 1958–59 to 1975–76: Bahawalpur

Career statistics
Competition	First-class
Matches	55
Runs scored	3530
Batting average	40.57
100s/50s	8/18
Top score	145
Balls bowled	5394
Wickets	111
Bowling average	24.49
5 wickets in innings	7
10 wickets in match	1
Best bowling	6/77
Catches/stumpings	18/–
- Source: Cricinfo, 17 May 2018

Javed Bhatti is a former cricketer who played first-class cricket for Bahawalpur in Pakistan from 1958 to 1975.

Probably born around 1940, Javed Bhatti had a long and successful career for Bahawalpur as a middle-order batsman and leg-spin bowler, often playing as captain. The highest of his eight centuries was 145 against Multan in 1971-72. His two best bowling performances came in the 1962-63 season, within a few days of each other in late November-early December 1962. He took 5 for 29 and 5 for 59 and made 109 (the only score above 45 in the match) against Multan, then took 6 for 77 against Lahore B.

He scored a quick 105, the only century of the match, for The Rest against Pakistan in 1967-68, but he never played for Pakistan.
