= Saira Afzal Tarar =

Pakistani politician (born 1966)

- سائرہ افضل تارڑ
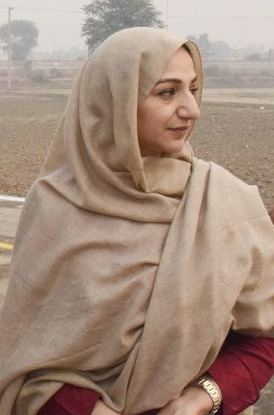
- Saira Afzal Tarar in 2014

Minister for National Health Services Regulation and Coordination
- In office 4 August 2017 – 31 May 2018
- President: Mamnoon Hussain
- Prime Minister: Shahid Khaqan Abbasi
- Succeeded by: Mohammad Yousuf Shaikh

Minister of State for National Health Services Regulation and Coordination
- In office 7 June 2013 – 28 July 2017
- President: Mamnoon Hussain
- Prime Minister: Nawaz Sharif
- Preceded by: Sania Nishtar
- Succeeded by
Parliamentary positions
Member of the National Assembly of Pakistan
In office 17 March 2008 – 31 May 2018
Constituency	NA-102 (Hafizabad-I)
- Incumbent
- Assumed office 1 April 2024

Personal details
- Born: 7 June 1966 (age 60) Hafizabad, Punjab, Pakistan
- Party: PMLN (2008-present)
- Relatives: Muhammad Rafiq Tarar (father-in-law); Attaullah Tarar (nephew); Bilal Farooq Tarar (nephew)
- Awards: Sitara-i-Imtiaz

Saira Afzal Tarar (Urdu: سائرہ افضل تارڑ; born 7 June 1966) is a Pakistani politician who served as Minister for National Health Services Regulation and Coordination, in the Abbasi cabinet from August 2017 to May 2018. She served as the Minister of State for National Health Services Regulation and Coordination from 2013 to 2017. A leader of Pakistan Muslim League (Nawaz), she had been a member of the National Assembly of Pakistan from 2008 to May 2018, and is currently serving as a member of the National Assembly of Pakistan, as a reserve seat candidate.

== Early life ==
She was born on 7 June 1966 in Hafizabad, Punjab, Pakistan.

== Political career ==
Tarar was elected to the National Assembly of Pakistan as a candidate of Pakistan Muslim League (N) (PML-N) from Constituency NA-102 (Hafizabad-I) in the 2008 Pakistani general election.

She was re-elected to the National Assembly as a candidate of PML-N from Constituency NA-102 (Hafizabad-I) in the 2013 Pakistani general election.

In June 2013, she was appointed the Minister of State for Health in the cabinet of Prime Minister Nawaz Sharif. She had ceased to hold ministerial office in July 2017 when the federal cabinet was disbanded following the disqualification of the then Prime Minister Nawaz Sharif after Panama Papers case decision.

Following the election of Shahid Khaqan Abbasi as Prime Minister of Pakistan in August 2017, she was inducted into the federal cabinet of Abbasi. She was appointed federal Minister of National Health Services Regulation and Coordination. Upon the dissolution of the National Assembly on the expiration of its term on 31 May 2018, Tarar ceased to hold the office as Federal Minister for National Health Services Regulation and Coordination. In March 2018, she received Sitara-i-Imtiaz for her public service by the President of Pakistan, Mamnoon Hussain.
