= Shaukat Ali Bhatti =

Pakistani politician

Member of the National Assembly of Pakistan
- In office 13 August 2018 – 20 January 2023
- Constituency: NA-87 (Hafizabad)

Personal details
- Born: Hafizabad District, Punjab, Pakistan
- Party: PTI (2018-present)
- Other political affiliations: PML(Q) (2002-2018)
- Children: 4
- Parent: Mehdi Hassan Bhatti (father)
- Relatives: Aneeqa Mehdi Bhatti (sister)

Chaudhary Shaukat Ali Bhatti (Urdu: چودھری شوکت علی بھٹی) is a Pakistani politician who had been a member of the National Assembly of Pakistan from August 2018 till January 2023. Previously, he was the member of the Provincial Assembly of Punjab from 2002 to 2007 and served as the Provincial Minister for Culture and Youth Affairs.

== Political career ==
He was elected to the Provincial Assembly of Punjab from Constituency PP-107 (Hafizabad-III) as a candidate of Pakistan Muslim League (Q) (PML-Q) in the 2002 Pakistani general election.

He was elected to the National Assembly of Pakistan from Constituency NA-87 (Hafizabad) as a candidate of Pakistan Tehreek-e-Insaf (PTI) in the 2018 Pakistani general election.
