= Health Secretary of Pakistan =

Government official

- Appointer: Prime Minister of Pakistan
- Website: Ministry of Health

The Health Secretary of Pakistan is the Federal Secretary for the Ministry of National Health Services, Regulation and Coordination. The position holder is a BPS-22 grade officer, usually belonging to the Pakistan Administrative Service. The current Health Secretary is Dr. M. Fakhr-e-Alam.

== See also ==
- Government of Pakistan
- Federal Secretary
- Education Secretary of Pakistan
- Cabinet Secretary of Pakistan
- Finance Secretary of Pakistan
- Petroleum Secretary of Pakistan
