= Hafizabad District =

District in Punjab, Pakistan

Coordinates: 32°04′12″N 73°40′48″E

Hafizabad ضلع حافظ آباد
- District of Punjab
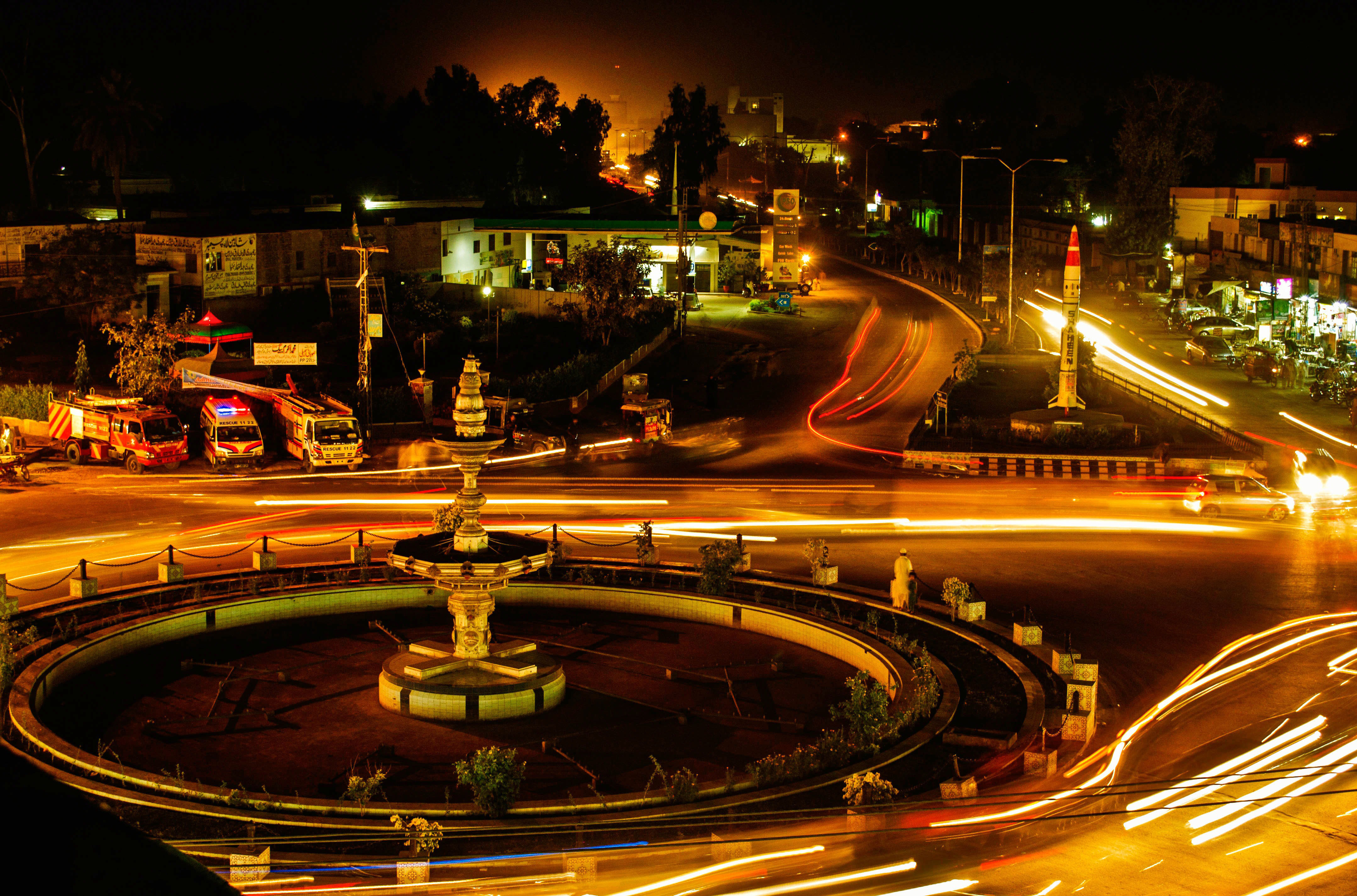
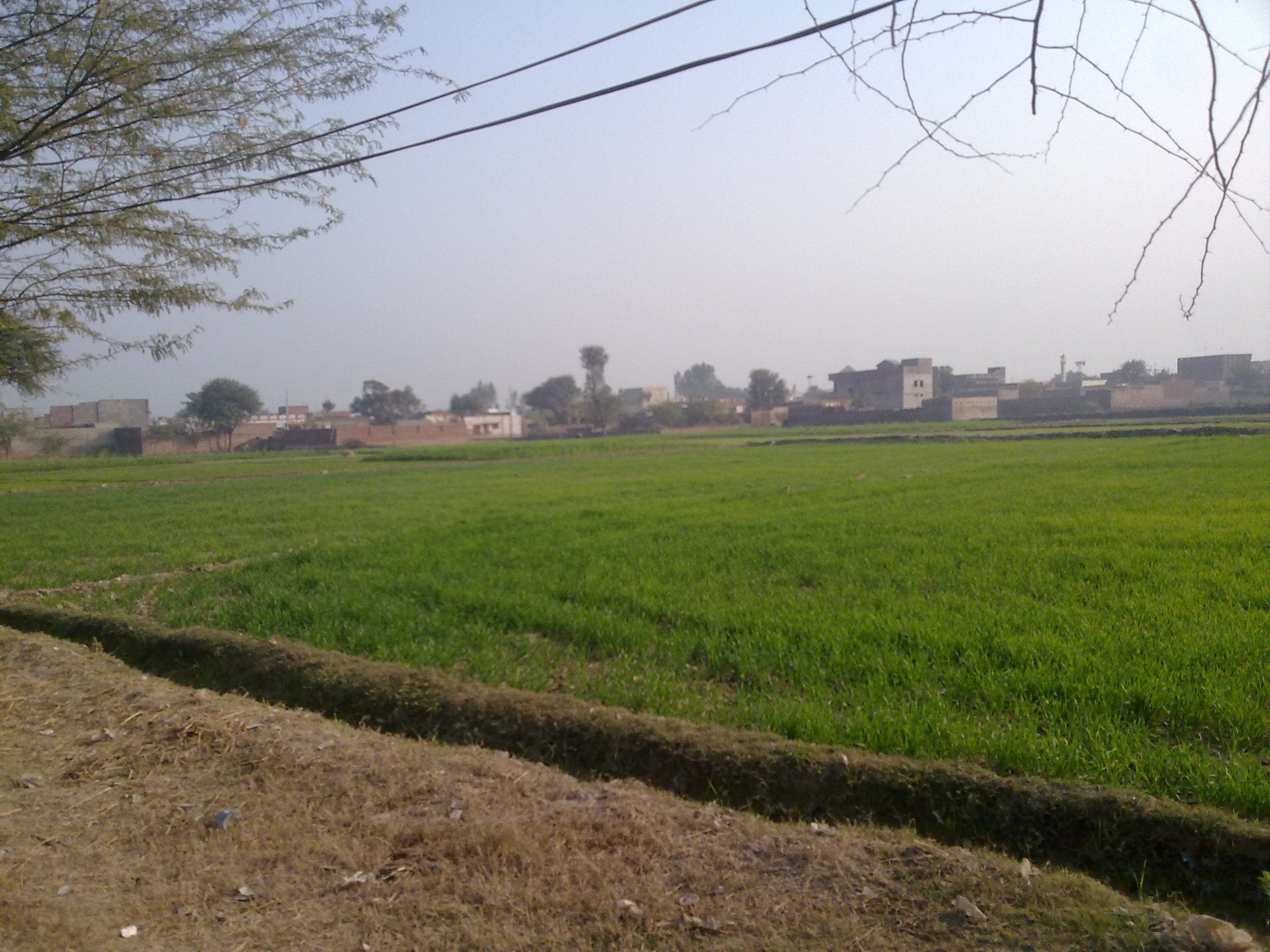
- Fawara Chowk in Hafizabad Fields of Bhoon Kalan

- Map of Punjab with Hafizabad District highlighted
- Country: Pakistan
- Province: Punjab
- Division: Gujrat
- Headquarters: Hafizabad

Government
  - Type: District Administration
  - Member of National Assembly: Saira Afzal Tarar (Pakistan Muslim League (N))
  - Deputy Commissioner: Mr. Abdul Razzaq
  - Assistant commissioner: Mr.Sohail Riaz

Area
  - District of Punjab: 2,367 km^{2} (914 sq mi)

Population (2023)
  - District of Punjab: 1,319,909
  - Density: 557.6/km^{2} (1,444/sq mi)
  - Urban: 504,380 (38.21%)
  - Rural: 815,529 (61.81%)

Literacy
  - Literacy rate: Total: (65.77%); Male: (70.70%); Female: (60.65%)
- Time zone: UTC+5 (PST)
- Area code: 0547
- Number of Tehsils: 2
- Website: hafizabad.punjab.gov.pk

Hafizabad District (Note: Punjabi and Urdu: ضلع حافظ آباد) is a district within the Gujrat Division of Punjab, Pakistan. Located in central Punjab, Hafizabad was established as a district in 1993; prior to which, it was a tehsil of Gujranwala District.

It is known for its rice industry on the agricultural side and rice industry on the industrial side and have top 5 exporters of rice from Pakistan.

The capital of the district, Hafizabad, known for strengthening the administration of Punjab.

== History ==
In 327 BC, when Alexander the Great invaded the territory that is now Pakistan, the territory of the Sandal Bar (where Hafizabad is now located) was a populated area. Big cities were located in the district, and many sub-states were organized here in the presidency of native Maharajas and Rajas. In 997 CE, Sultan Mahmud Ghaznavi, took over the Ghaznavid dynasty empire established by his father, Sultan Sebuktegin. In 1005, he conquered the Shahis in Kabul and followed it up by the conquests of the Punjab region.

The Delhi Sultanate and later Mughal Empire ruled the region. The Punjab region became predominantly Muslim due to missionary Sufi saints whose dargahs dot the landscape of the region. During the Delhi Sultanate period, a large city was situated at the site of the present village of Mehdiabad. But afterwards, this territory became unpopulated and was reclaimed by the jungle since there was a shortage of water and later Afghan incursions caused the population to leave. This situation persisted until Mughal Emperor Akbar's period. Hafizabad was formerly a place of some importance, and is mentioned in the Ain-i-Akbari as headquarters of a Mahal. Hafiz, the founder, was a favourite of emperor Mughal Emperor Akbar.

After the decline of the Mughal Empire, the Sikh Empire invaded and occupied Hafizabad District. The Muslims faced restrictions during Sikh rule.

In 1846, Hafizabad came under the supervision of British colonial rule, when a settlement of land revenue was effected under order from the provisional government at Lahore. The predominantly Muslim population supported Muslim League and Pakistan Movement. After the independence of Pakistan in 1947, the minority Hindus and Sikhs migrated to India while Muhajir refugees from India settled in the Hafizabad region. Most of the Muhajirs have since assimilated into the local population.

== Geography ==
Hafizabad is situated at 800 feet (240 m) above sea-level in central Punjab. The district is located between 32°-20' north latitudes and 73°-12' and 73°-46' east longitude. The river Chenab forms the northern and northwestern boundary of the district. Hafizabad shares its borders with Sheikhupura District and Gujranwala District in the east, Mandi Bahauddin District in the north, Sargodha District in the west, Faisalabad and Chiniot District in the south. Hafizabad is situated at a distance of 303 km from the Federal Capital, Islamabad, and is 109 km away from the Provincial Capital, Lahore. The district has a total area of 2,367 square kilometres and comprises two tehsils, namely Hafizabad and Pindi Bhattian. Major villages are Sukheke Mandi, Jalalpur Bhattian, Vanike Tarar, Rasulpur Tarar, and Kolo Tarar.

== Administration ==
The district is administratively subdivided into two tehsils, these are:

Tehsil	Area (km²)	Pop. (2023)	Density (ppl/km²) (2023)	Literacy rate (2023)	Union Councils
Pindi Bhattian	1,178	558,753	474.32	58.70%	...
Hafizabad	1,189	761,156	640.16	70.89%	...

== Climate ==
The climate of the district is hot and dry during the summer and moderately cold in the winter. The maximum summer temperature in June is 50 °C (122 °F), while in winter, during January, the minimum temperature is 1 °C (34 °F). Owing to the proximity of the hills, there is more rainfall in the east than the west. The monsoon season usually starts in the middle of July and continues until September. The soil is alluvial and fertile.

== Industry ==
Rice, power, and loom industries are important industries, located in Hafizabad city. Hafizabad Textile Power Loom industry is directly connected with Faisalabad which is a major industrial city in Pakistan known for its textile industry.

== Demographics ==
=== Population ===
Historical population
Year	Pop.	±% p.a.
1951	251,557	—
1961	291,778	+1.49%
1972	444,187	+3.89%
1981	567,572	+2.76%
1998	832,980	+2.28%
2017	1,156,954	+1.74%
2023	1,319,909	+2.22%

As of the 2023 census, Hafizabad district has 197,206 households and a population of 1,319,909. The district has a sex ratio of 103.11 males to 100 females and a literacy rate of 65.77%: 70.70% for males and 60.65% for females. 331,008 (25.08% of the surveyed population) are under 10 years of age. 504,380 (38.21%) live in urban areas.

=== Religion ===
Religion in Hafizabad district (2023)
Religion	Percent
Islam	99%
Christianity	0.9%
Others (Ahmadi, Baháʼí Faith, secular, etc.)	0.1%

Religion in contemporary Hafizabad District
Religious group	1941		2017		2023	
Religious group	Pop.	%	Pop.	%	Pop.	%
Islam	198,900	82.86%	1,146,551	99.10%	1,306,048	99%
Hinduism	27,321	11.38%	48	0.01%	380	0.02%
Sikhism	9,561	3.98%	—N/a	—N/a	5	~0%
Christianity	3,955	1.65%	8,453	0.73%	11,883	0.9%
Ahmadi	—N/a	—N/a	1,901	0.16%	1,273	0.07%
Others	297	0.13%	1	~0%	62	0.01%
Total Population	240,034	100%	1,156,954	100%	1,319,651	100%
Note: 1941 census data is for Hafizabad tehsil of erstwhile Gujranwala district, which roughly corresponds to contemporary Hafizabad district. District and tehsil borders have changed since 1941.

=== Language ===
Languages of Hafizabad district (2023)
1. Punjabi (95.7%)
2. Urdu (3.16%)
3. Others (1.10%)

At the time of the 2023 census, 95.74% of the population spoke Punjabi and 3.16% Urdu as their first language. The dialect of Punjabi spoken in the Hafizabad district is the Central Majhi dialect. Majhi is the only dialect of Punjabi spoken in Hafizabad district, which itself lies in the Greater Majha region, with no influence from any other Punjabi dialect.

According to the 1998 census, the district had a population of 832,980, of which 26.73% were urban.

== Education ==
Sub campuses of Sargodha University, and Virtual University of Pakistan and Government College University Faisalabad are established in the city. University of Hafizabad is now being constructed in Hafizabad.

Hafizabad has many colleges that offer a wide range of certificate and degree programs.

The education level is quite good as these colleges bring positions in University of the Punjab.

== Politics ==
District has nomination in National Assembly of Pakistan and Provincial Assembly of the Punjab as prior to 2017 Census of Pakistan, Hafizabad District had two national assembly and three provincial assembly seats that has been changed into one and only MNA with three MPA. NA-87 (Hafizabad) is newly created constituency that has 684,447 votes, Chaudhary Shoukat Ali Bhatti won the 2018 election on PTI ticket from this constituency against Saira Afzal Tarar who was contesting from PMLN side. and Mamoon Jaffar Tarar, Muzaffar Ali Sheikh and Ahsan Ansar Bhatti win respectively as member of Provincial Assembly of the Punjab.

== See also ==
- Divisions of Pakistan
- Tehsils of Pakistan
  - Tehsils of Punjab, Pakistan
  - Tehsils of Khyber Pakhtunkhwa, Pakistan
  - Tehsils of Balochistan, Pakistan
  - Tehsils of Sindh, Pakistan
  - Tehsils of Azad Kashmir
  - Tehsils of Gilgit-Baltistan
- District
  - Districts of Khyber Pakhtunkhwa, Pakistan
  - Districts of Punjab, Pakistan
  - Districts of Balochistan, Pakistan
  - Districts of Sindh, Pakistan
  - Districts of Azad Kashmir
  - Districts of Gilgit-Baltistan
