= Hafizabad =

City in Punjab, Pakistan

Hafizabad حافظ آباد (Punjabi)
- City
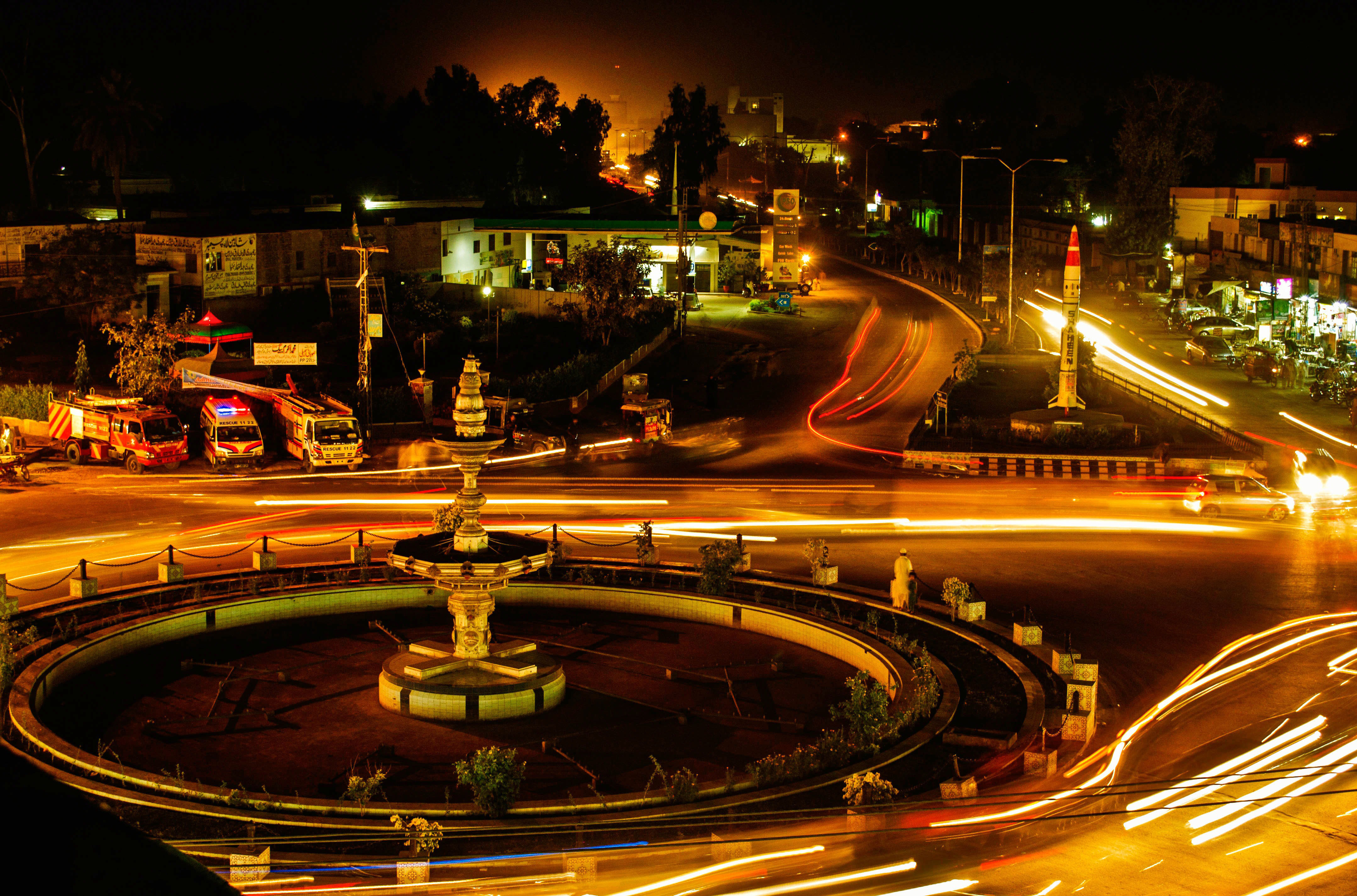
- Night view of Fawara Chowk, Hafizabad

- Location in Punjab, Pakistan Hafizabad (Pakistan)
- Coordinates: 32°04′17″N 73°41′16″E
- Country: Pakistan
- Province: Punjab
- Division: Gujrat
- District: Hafizabad
- Union councils: 25

Government
  - Type: Municipal Committee
  - Administrator: Umer Farooq

Area
  - Total: 38.5 km^{2} (14.9 sq mi)
- Elevation: 208 m (682 ft)

Population (2023 census)
  - Total: 318,621
  - Rank: 29th in Pakistan
  - Density: 8,280/km^{2} (21,400/sq mi)

Language
  - Official: Urdu, Punjabi
- Time zone: UTC+5 (PST)
- Postal code: 52110
- Calling code: 0547
- Website: Municipal Committee Hafizabad

Hafizabad (Punjabi / Urdu: حافظ آباد; Punjabi pronunciation: [ˈɦäːfᵊ zäbäːd̪]; Urdu pronunciation: [ˈɦɑːfɪzɑbɑːd̪]) is a city and capital of Hafizabad District located in Punjab, Pakistan. Hafizabad is an old settlement. In 327 BC, during Alexander's invasion of Punjab, the territory of the Sandal Bar was reported to be a well populated area. Large cities were located in this territory, and a lot of sub-states were organized under the presidency of maharajas and rajas. It is located to the east of Chenab River.

== History ==
In 327 BC, the area around Hafizabad was reportedly well-populated during Alexander's invasion of Punjab. During the Delhi Sultanate period, majority of the local population converted to Islam. A large city was situated at the site of the present village of Mehdiabad, northwest of present day Hafizabad. Later it became unpopulated due to shortage of water and Afghan incursions. The region remained uninhabited until the reign of Mughal emperor Akbar, when it became the site of a Mahal as documented in Ain-i-Akbari.

== Geography ==
Hafizabad is located 48 kilometres west of Gujranwala, and 60 kilometres southwest of Wazirabad.

Hafizabad railway station located in the city operates four trains to different parts of the country. On the Wazirabad - Faisalabad Railway Section, Hafizabad is the eighth railway station. Its average elevation is 208 metres above the sea level.

== Demographics ==
=== Population ===
Historical population

Year	Pop.	±% p.a.
1951	30,082	—
1961	34,576	+1.40%
1972	61,597	+5.39%
1981	83,464	+3.43%

Year	Pop.	±% p.a.
1998	133,678	+2.81%
2017	245,784	+3.26%
2023	318,621	+4.42%

According to 2023 census, Hafizabad had a population of 318,621.

=== Religion ===
Religion in Hafizabad city (2023)
Religion	Percent
Islam	99.5%
Christianity	0.39%
Ahmadi	0.1%
Others (Baháʼí Faith, Zoroastrianism, secular, etc.)	0.01%

According to the 2023 census, Hafizabad has an overwhelmingly Muslim population, with Muslims accounting for 99.5% of the city's population. Christianity is the second-largest religion, representing approximately 0.39% of the population.

Religion in contemporary Hafizabad City
Religious group	2023	
Religious group	Pop.	%
Islam	317,050	99.507%
Christianity	1,239	0.389%
Ahmadi	317	0.0995%
Hinduism	0	0%
Sikhism	0	0%
Others	15	0.005%
Total Population	318,621	100%

=== Language ===
Languages of Hafizabad city (2023)
1. Punjabi (94.0%)
2. Urdu (5.29%)
3. Others (0.71%)

According to the 2023 Census of Pakistan, Hafizabad has an overwhelmingly Punjabi-speaking population, with Punjabi spoken by 94% of residents. The dialect of Punjabi spoken in the Hafizabad city is the Central Majhi dialect. Majhi is the only dialect of Punjabi spoken in Hafizabad city, which itself lies in the Greater Majha region, with no influence from any other Punjabi dialect.

Urdu is the second most common first language at 5.29%. An additional 0.71% of the people spoke other languages of Pakistan.

== Climate ==
Hafizabad has a humid subtropical climate (Köppen Cwa), bordering on a hot semi-arid climate (BSh). The monsoon season is from June to September. It sees the most precipitation in July, with an average rainfall of 238.1 millimetres or 9.37 inches; and the least precipitation in November, with an average rainfall of 15.5 millimetres or 0.61 inches.

Climate data for Hafizabad
Month	Jan	Feb	Mar	Apr	May	Jun	Jul	Aug	Sep	Oct	Nov	Dec	Year
Mean daily maximum °C (°F)	19 (66)	22 (72)	27 (81)	33 (91)	39 (102)	40 (104)	36 (97)	35 (95)	34 (93)	31 (88)	26 (79)	21 (70)	30 (87)
Daily mean °C (°F)	12 (54)	15 (59)	20 (68)	27 (81)	32 (90)	34 (93)	32 (90)	31 (88)	29 (84)	25 (77)	18 (64)	13 (55)	24 (75)
Mean daily minimum °C (°F)	6 (43)	9 (48)	14 (57)	20 (68)	25 (77)	27 (81)	28 (82)	27 (81)	24 (75)	18 (64)	11 (52)	7 (45)	18 (64)
Average rainfall mm (inches)	18.1 (0.71)	30.5 (1.20)	32.8 (1.29)	25.5 (1.00)	17.0 (0.67)	76.2 (3.00)	238.1 (9.37)	191.0 (7.52)	91.7 (3.61)	31.6 (1.24)	15.5 (0.61)	21.6 (0.85)	789.6 (31.07)
Average rainy days (≥ 1 mm)	3.1	3.6	4.7	4.0	3.7	7.2	14.5	13.6	6.7	2.4	0.9	2.0	66.4
Mean daily daylight hours	10.3	11.1	12.0	13.0	13.8	14.2	14.0	13.3	12.3	11.4	10.5	10.1	12.2
Source: Weatherspark.com
