= Money laundering in Pakistan =

Money laundering in Pakistan involves the process of disguising the origins of illegally obtained funds, often linked to predicate offences such as corruption, drug trafficking, tax evasion, smuggling, human trafficking, and terrorism financing. The practice undermines economic stability, facilitates organised crime, and poses risks to the international financial system, as highlighted in assessments by the Financial Action Task Force (FATF) and the International Monetary Fund (IMF). Pakistan's efforts to combat it are governed by the Anti-Money Laundering Act of 2010 (AMLA), with the Financial Monitoring Unit (FMU) serving as the national financial intelligence unit.

Despite legislative reforms that led to Pakistan's removal from the FATF grey list in October 2022, challenges persist, including weak enforcement, political interference in high-profile cases, and vulnerabilities in the informal economy, such as hawala/hundi systems. The IMF has noted significant risks of corruption related money laundering, with penalties imposed on banks exceeding Rs944 million in 2023–24 for violations. These activities distort resource allocation, erode public trust, and contribute to economic losses estimated in billions annually, including up to $10 billion yearly from illicit financial flows.

== History ==
Money laundering concerns in Pakistan emerged prominently in the 1990s amid rising narcotics trafficking and informal financial flows, prompting initial legislative responses like the Control of Narcotic Substances Act of 1997. The issue intensified post-2001 due to links with terrorism financing, leading to international scrutiny from the FATF. In 2007, the Anti-Money Laundering Ordinance was enacted, establishing the FMU as Pakistan's financial intelligence unit, but it lapsed and was replaced by AMLA in 2010.

Pakistan was placed on the FATF grey list in June 2018 for strategic deficiencies in addressing money laundering and terrorist financing. To exit the list, the government implemented 34 action items, including enhanced prosecutions and asset freezes, achieving removal in October 2022. Subsequent FATF mutual evaluation reports in 2019 and follow-ups in 2021–22 rated Pakistan compliant or largely compliant on 22 of 40 recommendations, though effectiveness in areas like corruption and hawala remains moderate. By 2025, the IMF's governance assessment highlighted ongoing risks, urging stronger judicial independence and inter-agency coordination.

== Legal framework ==
The primary legislation is the Anti-Money Laundering Act, 2010 (AMLA), which criminalises money laundering as converting, possessing, using, or transferring property known to derive from a predicate offence, punishable by up to 10 years imprisonment and fines up to twice the laundered amount. Predicate offences include corruption, fraud, drug trafficking, human smuggling, and terrorism, as listed in AMLA's Schedule. Reporting entities such as banks, real estate agents, jewelers, and lawyers must file Suspicious Transaction Reports (STRs) and Currency Transaction Reports (CTRs) exceeding Rs2 million with the FMU.

The FMU, under the State Bank of Pakistan, analyses reports and disseminates intelligence to agencies like the Federal Investigation Agency (FIA), National Accountability Bureau (NAB), and Anti-Narcotics Force (ANF). Amendments in 2020 and 2022 expanded coverage to designated non-financial businesses and professions (DNFBPs) and aligned with FATF standards on beneficial ownership and virtual assets. The Anti-Terrorism Act, 1997, complements AMLA by addressing terrorism financing. Enforcement is supported by the National Executive Committee, chaired by the finance minister, which coordinates AML/CFT policies.

== Methods ==
Common methods in Pakistan include trade-based laundering via over- or under-invoicing in exports/imports, particularly in textiles and gems; real estate purchases with cash; and hawala/hundi networks for informal remittances, which evade formal banking and facilitate cross-border flows. Shell companies registered with fake identities launder funds through unrelated transactions, as seen in a 2024 case involving Rs16 billion via metal trading firms. Corruption proceeds are often layered through corporate vehicles or NGOs, while digital wallets and cryptocurrencies have emerged as risks for masking terror financing post-grey list exit.

The informal economy, comprising 40–50% of GDP, amplifies vulnerabilities, with porous borders enabling the smuggling of cash and goods.

== Notable cases ==
High-profile cases underscore enforcement gaps. In 2015, model Ayyan Ali was arrested at Islamabad airport attempting to smuggle $506,800 to Dubai, exceeding the $10,000 limit, and charged with money laundering; she was indicted in 2015, granted bail in 2015, declared a proclaimed offender in 2019, and the case was disposed of after a red notice request. Allegations linked the case to political figures, including claims of involvement by PPP leader Asif Ali Zardari.

In 2018, over 100 benami accounts in Summit Bank, Sindh Bank, and UBL laundered Rs35 billion, implicating Asif Ali Zardari and Faryal Talpur.

Maryam Nawaz's 2021 reopened case involved Rs70 million transfers linked to sugar mills. Prime Minister Shehbaz Sharif and his son Hamza Shahbaz were acquitted in 2022 in a multi-billion-rupee laundering probe involving sugar mills and offshore accounts, though the FIA alleged funds from corruption were routed via the UK. Former prime minister Imran Khan faces charges in the Al-Qadir Trust case, accused of receiving land worth Rs7 billion ($25 million) from a British developer in exchange for repatriated laundered funds.

The Chaudhry brothers Parvez Elahi and Moonis Elahi faced laundering probes in 2023, with accounts frozen.

In October 2024, the FIA arrested five in Karachi for laundering via foreign currency exchanges, recovering millions in illicit funds. The Rs16 billion shell company racket in 2024 involved politicians and builders using dummy directors for tax evasion and layering. Other cases include the 2023 Rs70 billion solar panel import scam, Rs3 billion construction fraud, and Rs2.4 billion ghost manufacturing unit in 2025. Judicial delays and low conviction rates below 10% in NAB cases persist, often due to political influence. In 2025, Bahria Town was implicated in Rs1.12 billion laundering via hawala and hospital transports. President Asif Ali Zardari was arrested in 2023 for multi-million dollar laundering.

In 2025, TLP chief Saad Rizvi was probed for foreign currency recovered from his residence.

== Impacts ==
Money laundering exacerbates corruption, distorting economic growth by diverting resources from productive sectors and inflating informal activities, which account for up to 50% of GDP. It erodes tax revenues estimated losses of Rs5–7 trillion annually from evasion and undermines foreign investment, contributing to fiscal deficits and debt burdens. Linked to terrorism, it sustains groups like Jaish-e-Mohammad via digital channels, posing security risks.

Socially, it perpetuates inequality, as elite capture through laundering weakens public services and fuels youth disillusionment. The IMF's 2025 assessment links it to sluggish growth (averaging 2% in 2023–24) and heightened vulnerability to external shocks. Internationally, pre-2022 grey listing reduced remittances by 10–15% and aid inflows.

== Response and efforts ==
The FATF's 2019 mutual evaluation rated Pakistan's technical compliance as moderate but effectiveness as low in prosecuting money laundering from corruption and terror financing. Post-removal from the grey list, the FATF warned in 2025 that vulnerabilities persist, urging sustained reforms. The IMF's 2025 diagnostic recommends judicial reforms, enhanced NAB independence, and better DNFBP supervision to address selective enforcement.

The FMU processed over 10,000 STRs in 2024, leading to 500 investigations, while the State Bank imposed Rs944 million in bank fines. Challenges include inter-agency silos, an understaffed FMU (only 150 personnel), and hawala proliferation. Future efforts focus on virtual asset regulation and AI-driven monitoring, per APG recommendations.
