= Special Investment Facilitation Council =

Pakistani government organisation

- Type: Governmental
- Purpose: To attract foreign investment and boost the country's economy
- Location: Pakistan
- Members: All Provincial Chief Ministers and the Army Chief
- Chairman: Shehbaz Sharif
- National Coordinator: Lt Gen. Asad Ur Rehman Cheema
- Director General: Major Gen. Sajid Amin Awan
- Website: www.sifc.gov.pk

The Special Investment Facilitation Council (SIFC) is a Federal government body and Investment Promotion Agency constituted under the Prime Minister of Pakistan. The SIFC was established on 20 June 2023 with the stated goal of acting as a "'single window' to facilitate investors, establish cooperation among all Government departments, and fast-track project development." The council consists of all Provincial Chief Ministers, Chief Secretaries, and the Army Chief. The SIFC has been assigned the task of increasing Foreign Direct Investment (FDI) in Pakistan to targeted level of $5 billion. The SIFC is also notable for the involvement of the Army in joint civil-military economic decision making.

== Background ==
Following Coronavirus in 2020 foreign investment in domestic bonds "left the country", while in June 2023 FDI fell to a twelve-year low. The establishment of the SIFC is seen as a response to the requirement for economic revitalization during Pakistan's economic crisis, specifically addressing the obstacles posed by bureaucratic red tape and intricate regulations that act as deterrents to foreign direct investment (FDI). With the objective of facilitating smoother collaboration with Gulf Cooperation Council (GCC) nations and raising FDI in different sectors, including agriculture and information technology.

== Role and Function ==
The SIFC operates as a leading decision-making platform aimed at spearheading "structural reforms" within the economy. The forum claims to focus on harnessing the potential of various economic sectors, including information technology, agriculture, energy, mineral resources, mining, and defense production. Another primary objective of the SIFC is to attract investments from "friendly nations." The SIFC operates under the IMF's Public Investment Management Assessment (PIMA), with the fund stating this as "particularly important given the SIFC’s power to offer regulatory relief and other immunities and the centrality of a level playing field for all investors." In June 2024 Shehbaz Sharif established a Cabinet Committee to "oversee" the SIFC.

== Policies and Programs ==
On 14 December 2023 the SIFC approved "business and investment-friendly SIFC visa." In October SIFC ordered the Petroleum Division to "prepare ‘Merit Order’ for supply of gas" to various sectors, proposals for a "cost-of-service" industrial tariff and a Weighted Average Cost of Gas (WACOG). Business Recorder also reported that SIFC 'cleared' a request of the All Pakistan Textile Mills Association to reduce industrial power tariffs to 9/kWh per cent. SIFC's apex committee in January 2024 ordered the Federal Board of Revenue to conduct an audit of urea/fertilizer companies and sellers "against the quantity of urea sold/ distributed to farmers." The special investment council has expressed support for the army-backed crackdown on smuggling and hoarding. According to Shehbaz Sharif, then-recent investments from the United Arab Emirates and Saudi Arabia were to be conducted under SIFC. A "push" in March from the investment council led to the Ministry of Information Technology and Telecommunication "... working on a plan to develop an IC design cluster in Pakistan through training of students and young professionals,” while it was "set to implement a plan for developing a semiconductor and chip design industry" in Pakistan. According to Mettis Global, SIFC will establish "ten thousand E-Rozgaar centers" for freelancers.

== Structure ==
Special Investment Facilitation Council (SIFC) Structure
=== Apex Committee ===					Ref
Office/Portfolio	Office-Holder	Status	Emblem	Branch	Ref
Prime Minister	Shehbaz Sharif	Chairman		Centre/Federal	
Federal Minister for PD&SI	Ahsan Iqbal	Member		Centre/Federal	
Federal Minister of Finance	Muhammad Aurangzeb	Member		Centre/Federal	
Federal Minister of IT & Telecom	Shaza Fatima Khawaja	Member		Centre/Federal	
Federal Minister of NFS&R	Rana Tanveer Hussain	Member		Centre/Federal	
Federal Minister of Industries & Production	Rana Tanveer Hussain	Member		Centre/Federal	
Federal Minister of Energy	Awais Leghari	Member		Centre/Federal	
Federal Minister of Water Resources	Musadik Malik	Member		Centre/Federal	
Federal Minister of Defense	Khawaja Asif	Member		Centre/Federal	
Federal Minister of Defence Production	Khawaja Asif	Member		Centre/Federal	
Federal Minister for Board of Investment	Aleem Khan	Member		Centre/Federal	
Chief of the Army Staff	Gen. Asim Munir	Member		Pakistan Army	
Chief Minister of Balochistan	Sarfraz Bugti	Member		Provincial Govt	
Chief Minister of Sindh	Murad Ali Shah	Member		Provincial Govt	
Chief Minister of Khyber Pakhtunkhwa	Sohail Afridi	Member		Provincial Govt	
Chief Minister of Punjab	Maryam Nawaz	Member		Provincial Govt	
National Coordinator	Lt Gen. Asad Ur Rehman Cheema	Member		Pakistan Army	
Special Assistant to the Prime Minister	Dr. Jahanzeb Khan	Secretary		Centre/Federal	
=== Executive Committee ===
Federal Minister for PD&SI	Ahsan Iqbal	Chairman		Centre/Federal	
National Coordinator	Lt Gen. Asad Ur Rehman Cheema	Member		Pakistan Army	
Special Assistant to the Prime Minister	Dr. Jahanzeb Khan	Member		Centre/Federal	
Director General SIFC (DG-SIFC)	Major Gen. Sajid Amin Awan	Member		Pakistan Army	
Secretary, Board of Investment	Rahim Hayat Qureshi	Secretary		Centre/Federal	
Secretary, Ministry of Foreign Affairs	Amna Baloch	Member		Centre/Federal	
Federal Ministers (Note: Federal Ministers of; (i) Defence, (ii) NFS&R, (iii) IT & Telecom and (iv) Power. Ministers of State of; (i) Petroleum, (ii) Finance)	Multiple	Members		Centre/Federal	
Provincial Ministers (Note: Provincial Ministers of; (i) Agriculture, (ii) Mines and Minerals, (iii) IT, (iv) Energy, (v) Board of Revenue, (vi) Irrigation, (vii) Finance, (viii) Planning and Development and (ix) Investment)	Multiple	Members		Provincial Govt	
All Provincial Chief Secretaries	Multiple	Members		Provincial Govt	
=== Implementation Committee ===
Special Assistant to the Prime Minister	Dr. Jahanzeb Khan	Chairman		Centre/Federal	
Director General SIFC (DG-SIFC)	Major Gen. Sajid Amin Awan	Member		Pakistan Army	
Secretary SIFC Secretariat	Jamil Ahmad Qureshi	Member		Centre/Federal	
Secretary, Ministry of Foreign Affairs	Amna Baloch	Member		Centre/Federal	
Other and Co-Opted Members (in the Implementation Committee)
● Representative of Pakistan Army ● Five (5) Sector Coordinators ● Five (5) Co-coordinators ex-Pakistan Army ● Finance Secretary (Imdad Ullah Bosal) ● Board of Investment Secretary (Rahim Hayat Qureshi) ● Economic Affairs Division Secretary (Kazim Niaz) ● Chairman of the FBR (Rashid Langrial) ● Deputy Governor State Bank of Pakistan (nominated by SBP governor) ● 'Provincial Focal Persons'					

== Performance ==
In February 2024 FDI recovered by 16% ($131 million) after a previous decline in June, IT exports increased by 32% ($257 million) during the month, while domestic banks invested Rs25.60 trillion in government securities, raising the investment-to-deposit ratio (IDR) to "all-time high" of 93%, having been 85% the year before. Increased investment in government securities leading to "positive sentiments" at the PSX after Treasury Bills reached a four-year high in March 2024. According to the State Bank of Pakistan (SBP) short-term external investment increased by 84% (Rs. 501.30 billion), a thirty-month high in May. In July T-bills and equity markets continued to increase in foreign inflows, reaching the "second-highest net inflows in a year in Pakistan’s history"; originating from the United Kingdom, United States, Belgium, Luxembourg, Australia, Bahrain, Ireland, the UAE and the Cayman Islands. The same month FDI increased by 17% to $1.9 billion, primarily sourced from China, Hong Kong, the UK, US and Singapore. According to data of the Pakistan Bureau of Statistics, the Special Investment Facilitation Council (SIFC) was responsible for boosting Pakistan’s exports by 10% (to $30.64 billion) in FY2024.

In October, Bloomberg reported that Pakistan's local government bonds in 2024 earned $875 million in overseas inflows, among the highest returns in Asia. This after four-years of outflows adding up to $1.4 billion. Pakistan's stock index increased by 73%, "making it the world’s best performer", while dollar-bonds also yielded 40%. These increases attributed to IMF-backed foreign reserve tranches, "stable currency", and cooling inflation rates. In First Quarter FY25, FDI grew by 48%, although foreign inflows from Gulf investors "remained negligible."

In May 2024, the National Accounts Committee (NAC) reported that Pakistan's investment ratio has fallen to its lowest point in 50 years. With Shahbaz Rana writing that the SIFC has "so far succeeded in addressing coordination issues among federal and provincial governments and removing procedural bottlenecks. However, these efforts have not led to significant increases in either foreign or domestic investment." As well as not being able to realize a Saudi investment pledge of $5 billion. Writing in The Express Tribune Khalil Ahmed commented that FDI growth "does not take into account under what terms and conditions the FDI is brought in by adopting such measures. But this does preclude the possibility of resolving the chronic issues, that the economy of Pakistan faces, always by resorting to short-term and ad-hoc measures, that is, firefighting through the likes of the SIFC." SIFC has also been criticized for being a "rehashed" Board of Investment, short-term policy formulation and continuing issues in other sectors.

Despite this, SIFC initiatives have stabilised the economy and brought down Pakistan’s high inflation rate to a 6-year historic low at 4.9% in November 2024.

A 2025 IMF diagnostic assessment report on governance and corruption identified the SIFC as a major governance concern, noting its broad legal immunity for officials, many from the armed forces, and its authority to exempt projects from regulatory requirements. The report criticized the council’s lack of transparency and called for an end to special treatment for "influential public sector entities" in government contracts.

== See also ==
- Pakistan Single Window
- Board of Investment
- Federal Government of Pakistan
- Foreign trade of Pakistan
- Investment Promotion Agency
- Pakistani economic crisis (2022–present)
