= 2023 Pakistan black market crackdown =

2023 crackdown against illicit activities in Pakistan
- Date: Early September 2023
- Location: Nationwide in Pakistan
- Participants: Government of Pakistan; Pakistan Armed Forces; Law enforcement agencies
- Outcome: Black markets of forex successfully eradicated; Recovery of over 27 million rupees from power theft; Arrest of 194 electricity thieves; Seizure of commodities worth 2.25 billion rupees; Arrests related to illegal currency exchange

In early September 2023, the Pakistani government under administration of the Pakistan Armed Forces initiated a crackdown targeting both individuals and organizations engaged in various forms of smuggling, with a particular focus on essential commodities such as wheat, sugar, urea, oil, dollars as well as power theft, hoarding, and illegal currency exchange. The crackdown was announced by Asim Munir.

== Major operations ==
=== Power theft ===
The government's crackdown against power theft, hoarding, and smuggling remains in full swing across the country. In the ongoing nationwide effort to combat power theft, authorities have successfully recovered over Rs950 million rupees with nearly 500 individuals arrested involved in electricity theft. The Senate Standing Committee on Power has commended the Power Division for its prompt and effective actions in addressing line losses and electricity theft across various DISCOs (Distribution Companies).

=== Dollar smuggling ===
As part of the crackdown against illegal foreign currency exchange operations, the Federal Investigation Agency (FIA) conducted raids on illicit money exchange dealers in Rawalpindi, resulting in the arrest of four individuals engaged in illegal currency exchange businesses.

=== Others goods smuggling ===
The government has significantly ramped up its efforts to combat sugar smuggling. Pakistan Customs in September 2023 conducted an intensified anti-smuggling campaign across the country, resulting in the seizure of essential commodities valued at 2.25 billion rupees. The seized items encompassed a wide range of essential goods, including sugar, urea, petroleum, currency, tires, black tea, vehicles, iron, steel, and various other commodities.

== Impact ==
The crackdown had a substantial impact on curbing illicit activities throughout the country. It not only resulted in the recovery of substantial sums of money but also led to the apprehension of numerous individuals engaged in these unlawful practices.

== See also ==
- Deportation of undocumented Afghans from Pakistan
