= Pakistan Single Window =

E-government initiative by Pakistan Customs

- Abbreviation: PSW
- Founder: Pakistan Customs
- Founded at: Pakistan
- Type: Government-led initiative
- Website: www.psw.gov.pk

The Pakistan Single Window (PSW) stands as a prominent undertaking spearheaded by Pakistan Customs. Its overarching objective is to diminish the time and expenses associated with conducting business by transitioning Pakistan's cross-border trade into a digital realm, thereby eliminating the need for paper-based manual procedures.

The PSW represents a tangible implementation of trade facilitation principles aimed at mitigating procedural hurdles. It enables international traders engaged in cross-border commerce to submit their information to a single agency instead of navigating the complexities of dealing with multiple agencies spread across various locations. This streamlined approach simplifies the acquisition of essential documents, permits, and clearances necessary for the completion of import or export procedures.

== Background ==
In alignment with its trade facilitation and regional connectivity goals, Pakistan is modernizing, enhancing, and automating its system to align with the concurrent investments being made in its cross-border trade infrastructure. Pakistan has officially endorsed the World Trade Organization's (WTO) Agreement on Trade Facilitation on 27 October 2015. Consequently, it has made a 'Category C' commitment under Article 10.4 of this agreement, which involves the establishment of a trade-related National Single Window (NSW). The implementation timeline for this commitment spans five years, commencing on 22 February 2017.

== Integration with Government Departments ==
A major accomplishment for the PSW has been reached as it successfully incorporated its digital services with four crucial government departments during its Phase-II deployment. This integration involves the Mercantile Marine Department (MMD), the Marine Fisheries Department (MFD), the Ministry of Narcotics Control (MNC), and a partial connection with the Drug Regulatory Authority of Pakistan (DRAP). This collaborative effort empowers these government bodies to expedite the issuance of certificates, licenses, and permissions to cross-border traders through electronic channels.

The Federal Board of Revenue (FBR) has enforced a compulsory requirement for all government agencies that are integrated with the PSW system to adopt Post Clearance Audit (PCA) procedures. This measure is taken to ensure strict adherence to customs and other trade-related laws and regulations.

The PSW has introduced a new service aimed at simplifying the import and clearance processes for pesticides. As an integral component of this service, the PSW has implemented a unified registration system, facilitating the electronic registration of pesticide products and premises with the Department for Plant Protection.

As of 3 May 2023, the PSW has expanded its operations to encompass all dry ports across Pakistan, excluding Quetta. This expansion is undertaken with the primary goal of enhancing and streamlining the nation's cross-border trade operations.

Through a cooperative effort with the Ministry of Maritime Affairs, the PSW has achieved the successful integration of the Marine Fisheries Department (MFD) and Mercantile Marine Department (MMD) into its network of digitally interconnected entities.

== Interface for GCC Investors ==
The Pakistan government has established a Special Investment Facilitation Council (SIFC) with the aim of serving as a "single-window" interface to facilitate potential investors from Gulf Cooperation Council (GCC) nations.

== Future Developments ==
The PSW is steadfast in its efforts to incorporate additional government agencies as part of its gradual rollout strategy. After the successful integration of these departments falling under the Ministry of Maritime Affairs, the subsequent phase will involve the implementation of the Port Community System, a system devised by PSW in collaboration with all maritime stakeholders, including the Ministry and international experts.

== See also ==
- Special Investment Facilitation Council
