= Sarfraz Ahmed (general) =

Pakistan military person

Sarfraz Ahmed HI(M)
- Born: Pakistan
- Education: Pakistan Military Academy
- Military career
- Allegiance: Pakistan
- Branch: Pakistan Army
- Service years: 1990 – present
- Rank: Lieutenant General
- Units: 148 Light Air Defence (Self-Propelled) Regiment, Azad Kashmir Regiment
- Awards: Hilal-i-Imtiaz (Military)

Sarfraz Ahmed is a three-star general in the Pakistan Army, who has served as Inspector General of Arms (IG Arms) at General Headquarters in Rawalpindi and, subsequently, as National Coordinator of the Special Investment Facilitation Council (SIFC).

== Military career ==
Ahmed was commissioned in 1990 into the 148 Light Air Defence (Self-Propelled) Regiment of the Azad Kashmir Regiment through the 82nd PMA Long Course. He was promoted from the rank of Brigadier to Major General in April 2019.

He was subsequently promoted to Lieutenant General and appointed as Inspector General of Arms at General Headquarters in Rawalpindi. He was later appointed as National Coordinator of the Special Investment Facilitation Council in Islamabad.
