= Begging in Pakistan =

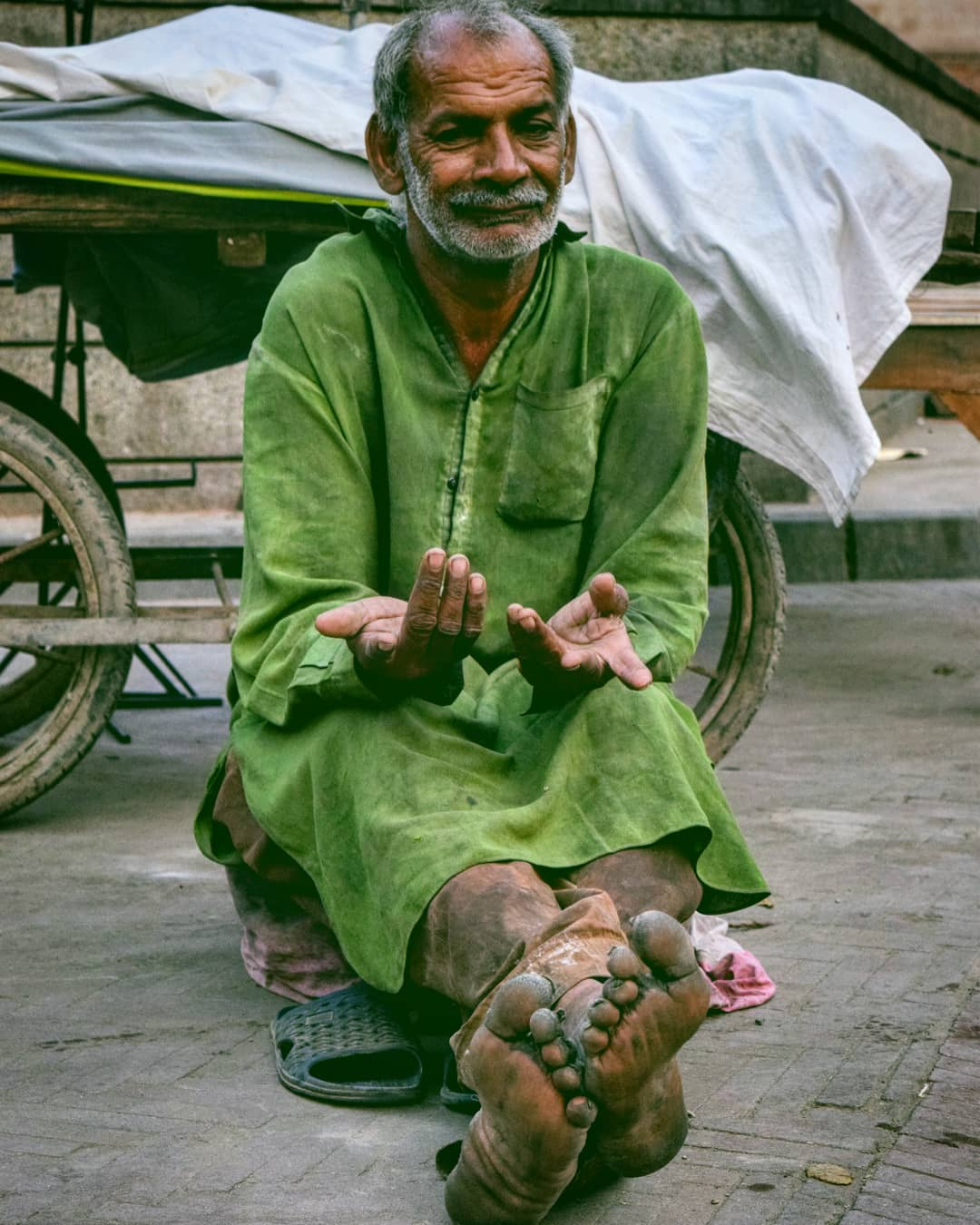
A man begging in Pakistan.

Begging in Pakistan, often referred to as the "begging industry of Pakistan", involves the widespread practice of begging, which has evolved into an organized and sometimes transnational activity due to poverty, unemployment, and criminal networks. While rooted in cultural and religious traditions of charity, the phenomenon has been exacerbated by economic instability, affecting an estimated 1 million to 2 million to million individuals and generating billions in daily collections, though precise figures remain disputed.

This practice is particularly prominent in urban centers such as Karachi, Lahore, and Islamabad, where beggars often target traffic intersections, religious sites, and public spaces. Organised elements include mafia-like groups that exploit vulnerable populations, including children and the disabled, often through coercion or trafficking. Internationally, Pakistani beggars have been deported from countries such as Saudi Arabia and Iraq, prompting diplomatic tensions and domestic legislative responses.

Government efforts to curb the issue include rehabilitation centres and passport restrictions, but enforcement remains inconsistent due to socio-economic root causes. The scale of begging not only perpetuates dependency but also undermines public health, urban order, and Pakistan's global image.

== History ==
Begging in Pakistan traces its origins to the post-independence era, when partition in 1947 displaced millions, leading to widespread poverty and urban migration. The influx of refugees from India overwhelmed social services, making alms-seeking a survival mechanism in cities. Early responses were limited, with the West Pakistan Vagrancy Ordinance of 1958 criminalising begging by imposing up to three years' imprisonment, though enforcement was lax.

By the 1980s and 1990s, economic liberalisation and urbanisation amplified the issue, transforming begging into a more structured activity. The 2000s saw the rise of organised syndicates, particularly in Punjab and Sindh, where families or gangs controlled territories for alms collection. In 2011, the Lahore High Court directed authorities to enforce anti-begging laws, establish rehabilitation homes, and regulate charity distribution, marking a judicial push against professional beggary. The phenomenon gained international notoriety in the 2020s amid economic crises, with reports of "exported" beggars under pilgrimage visas.

== Causes ==
The proliferation of begging in Pakistan is primarily attributed to systemic poverty, with approximately 40% of the population living below the international poverty line of $3.65 per day as of 2023. High unemployment rates, particularly among youth (11.1% for ages 15–24 in 2023), limited job opportunities for unskilled workers, and inflation exceeding 29% in 2023 have forced many into street solicitation.

Cultural factors, including religious emphasis on zakat (obligatory alms) and sadaqah (voluntary charity), inadvertently sustain the practice by encouraging direct giving, particularly during Ramadan when professional beggars swell urban ranks." Organised crime plays a significant role, with mafias trafficking vulnerable groups such as children as young as five from rural areas to urban centres who are bought, sold, or kidnapped into begging rings, with gangs enforcing quotas through violence or debt bondage. Urban migration and inadequate social safety nets further compound the issue, as displaced individuals lack access to education or vocational training.

== Scale and organisation ==
Estimates suggest 25 to 38 million people engage in begging, representing up to 16% of Pakistan's 230 million population, though these figures are contested and may include both professional and occasional beggars. Daily earnings vary by location: approximately Rs2,000 in Karachi, Rs1,400 in Lahore, and Rs950 in Islamabad, with a national average of Rs850 per beggar. Circulating claims of Rs32 billion in daily collections (equating to $42 billion annually, or 12% of GDP) have been debunked as misleading, originating from unverified social media and lacking empirical methodology.

The "industry" operates through hierarchical networks, with "bosses" assigning territories such as shrines where gangs trade kidnapped children for alms collection and taking cuts from earnings. For instance, an estimated 3,000 children went missing in Karachi in 2010, many traded between shrine-based gangs. Competition for prime spots, such as traffic signals or shrines, has led to turf wars and even court cases over begging rights." Internationally, an estimated 44,000 beggars were repatriated from Gulf countries between 2021 and 2024, with 90% of those arrested abroad identified as Pakistani."

== Impacts ==
Begging perpetuates a cycle of poverty and social exclusion, with many children denied education and vulnerable to exploitation, including forced labour and abuse, while marginalized groups like transgender individuals face additional barriers, often resorting to begging due to employment discrimination. Economically, it drains resources from productive sectors, discourages formal employment, and burdens urban infrastructure, deterring tourism and investment. Health risks are heightened, as beggars face exposure to disease and malnutrition without access to services.

Internationally, the export of beggars has strained diplomatic relations, leading to visa restrictions and reputational damage for Pakistan, including the expulsion of over 9,000 foreign beggars (many Pakistani) from Saudi Arabia in 1998 amid a begging ban and, more recently, over 5,400 deportations from Saudi Arabia, Iraq, the UAE, and other Gulf countries since January 2024. Domestically, it fosters crime, with links to human trafficking and pickpocketing, as evidenced by arrests at Mecca's Grand Mosque. The practice also undermines cultural norms of charity, redirecting aid from structured welfare to organised syndicates.

== Government response ==
Pakistan's legal framework against begging dates to the 1958 Vagrancy Ordinance, but convictions are rare due to enforcement gaps. Provincial initiatives, such as Punjab's 2014 Beggars Rehabilitation Home in Lahore, provide shelter, vocational training, and religious education to inmates, with child beggars referred to protection bureaus. In 2024–2025, the federal government escalated measures by blacklisting over 4,300 beggars on the Exit Control List, blocking passports for seven years, and arresting facilitators.

Parliament passed amendments to the Prevention of Trafficking in Persons Act in February 2025, criminalising "organised begging" as human trafficking and mandating affidavits from Umrah pilgrims pledging non-begging. The Federal Investigation Agency has conducted raids on travel agencies, while calls persist for poverty alleviation, job creation, and public awareness campaigns to redirect charity to NGOs. Despite these efforts, critics argue that without addressing root causes like unemployment, measures remain palliative.

== See also ==
- Poverty in Pakistan
- Human trafficking in Pakistan
