= Pakistan Carpet Manufacturers and Exporters Association =

National carpet producers

Pakistan Carpet Manufacturers and Exporters Association (PCMEA) was established in 1960 to run the affairs and work to promote carpet manufacturing industry of the country. The association is divided in two circles, Northern and Southern, with respective offices in Lahore and Karachi. The association has around 500 active members from all four provinces of the country. An executive body is elected every year comprising 24 members (12 from each circle). In 2014, Usman Ghani was elected the central chairman.

== Annual carpet exhibition ==
Stalls and visitors at Annual Carpet Exhibition in Lahore, Pakistan in October 2014

PCMEA holds an annual carpet exhibition and invites international importers, retailers and buyers to attend the fair. PCMEA provides the foreign visitors with airfare and lodging to attend the fair that is normally held for 3 or 4 days.

Here is a list of past exhibitions:

Year	Date	Venue
2017	5-7 October	Faletti's Hotel, Lahore
2016	4-6 October	Faletti's Hotel, Lahore
2015	28–30 September	Faletti's Hotel, Lahore
2014	14–17 October	Pearl Continental Hotel, Lahore
2013	22–25 October	Pearl Continental Hotel, Lahore
2012	7–9 October	Expo Centre, Lahore
2011	22 October	Pearl Continental Hotel, Lahore
2008	28–31 August	Pearl Continental Hotel, Lahore
2005	28–30 August	Expo Centre, Karachi
2004	28–30 August	Old Airport, Lahore
2003	28–30 August	Expo Centre, Karachi
2002	29 August - 1 September	Lahore

== See also ==
- Pakistani rug
- Chobi rug
- Turkmen rug
