= Poverty in Pakistan =

In 2026, the Government of Pakistan stated that approximately 45% of the population estimated to be living below the international poverty line of US$4.20 per day in FY2024–25. In September 2021, the government stated that 22% percent of its population lives below the national poverty line set at Rs. 3030 (US$11) per month.

Independent bodies supported estimates of a considerable fall in the statistic by the 2007-08 fiscal year, when it was estimated that 17.2% of the total population lived below the poverty line. The declining trend in poverty as seen in the country during the 1970s and 1980s was reversed in the 1990s by poor federal policies and rampant corruption. This phenomenon has been referred to as the "poverty bomb". In 2001, the government was assisted by the International Monetary Fund (IMF) in preparing the Interim Poverty Reduction Strategy Paper that suggests guidelines to reduce poverty in the country. According to a 2016 report submitted by Ministry of Planning and Development in the National Assembly of Pakistan, about 24.3% Pakistani lived below the poverty line which translated into 55 million people.

In 2022, Pakistan's Human Development Index (HDI) was 0.544, and ranks 161 out of 192 countries. In 2024, Pakistan ranked 164 out of 194 countries. However, the ranking under the inequality adjusted Human Development Index (IHDI) was 138th.

As of 2025, approximately 45% of Pakistan’s population was living below the poverty line. The information was based on revised poverty thresholds and survey data from 2018–19. The World Bank also noted a rise in extreme poverty, with the proportion increasing from 4.9% to 16.5%. Additionally, 10 million additional individuals were found to be at risk of descending into poverty.

According to the 2026 Multidimensional Poverty Index (MPI) by UNDP, 38.3 per cent of Pakistan’s population was multidimensionally poor. The intensity of deprivation among the multidimensionally poor stood at 51.7. Another 12.9 per cent of the population was considered vulnerable to multidimensional poverty.

== Wealth distribution ==
Wealth distribution in Pakistan is slightly varied, with the top 10% of the population earning 27.6% and the bottom 10% earning only 4.1% of the income. Pakistan generally has a low Gini coefficient and therefore a decent distribution of income (relatively lower inequality). In 2015, 24.3% Pakistanis lived below Pakistan's definition of poverty. Statistics vary due to the definition of poverty. According to the World Bank, poverty in Pakistan fell from 64.3% in 2001 to 24.3% in 2015. Poverty headcount ratio at $1.90 a day (2011 PPP) (% of population) fell from 6.2% in 2013 to 4% in 2015. Pakistan has made substantial progress in reducing poverty giving it the second lowest headcount poverty rate in South Asia.

AidData cites the World Bank and states that overall "Pakistan has done well in converting economic growth into poverty reduction."

According to a World Bank report in 2019, districts varied widely in poverty, with the richest district Abbottabad at a head count ratio of 5.8pc and the poorest district — Washuk District in Balochistan — at 72.5pc.

=== Poverty rate by province ===
Percent of population living on less than $2.15, $3.65 and $6.85 a day, international dollars (2017 PPP) as per the World Bank.

Percent of population living on less than poverty thresholds
Province	$2.15	$3.65	$6.85	Year
Balochistan	12.10%	69.00%	96.00%	2018
Khyber Pakhtunkhwa	6.70%	50.40%	90.70%	2018
Sindh	6.30%	42.10%	85.80%	2018
Punjab	3.00%	32.70%	80.80%	2018
Pakistan	4.9%	39.8%	84.5%	2018

== Spatial distribution of poverty ==
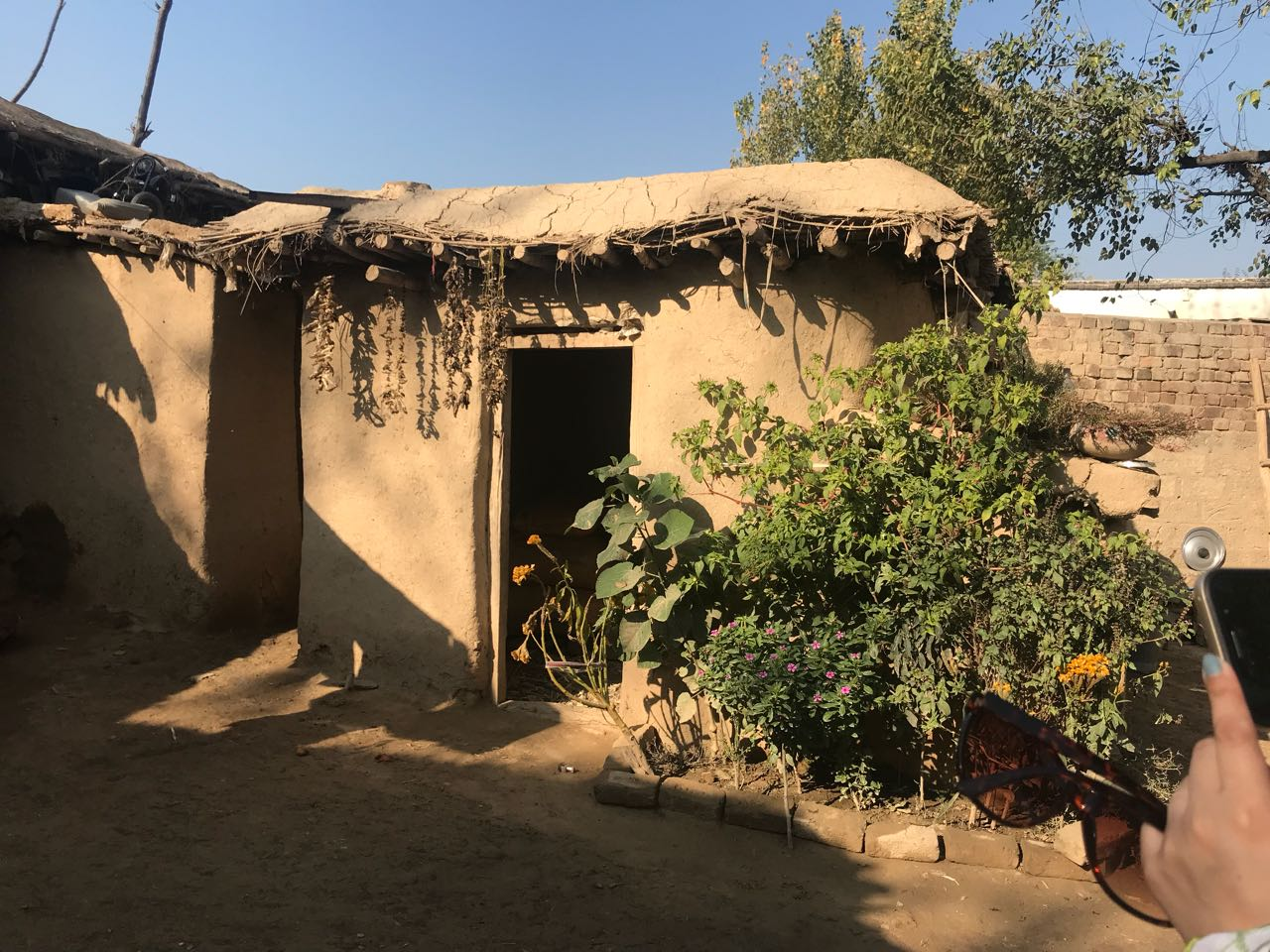
Mud houses are common among the people living in poverty.

During the last decade, poverty elimination programs helped many of the poor to participate and rise up. However the 2008 financial crisis and other factors such as the occupation of Afghanistan impacted Pakistani growth. Poverty in Pakistan has historically been higher in rural areas and lower in the cities. Out of the total 40 million living below the poverty line, thirty million live in rural areas. Poverty rose sharply in the rural areas in the 1990s and the gap in income between urban and rural areas of the country became more significant. This trend has been attributed to a disproportionate impact of economic events in the rural and urban areas. Punjab also has significant gradients in poverty among the different regions of the province.

Despite this, tremendous progress has been made in many areas. The NWFP now boasts several universities including the Ghulam Ishaq Khan University of Science and Technology. Peshawar, a sleep cantonment during British towns, is a modern cosmopolitan city. Much more can be done to invest in the social and economic structures. NWFP remains steeped in tribal culture, though the biggest Pahan city is Soviet invasion of neighboring Afghanistan is intact and according to Western reports supported the Taliban regime. These and other activities have led to a breakdown of law and order in many parts of the region.

== Poverty ==
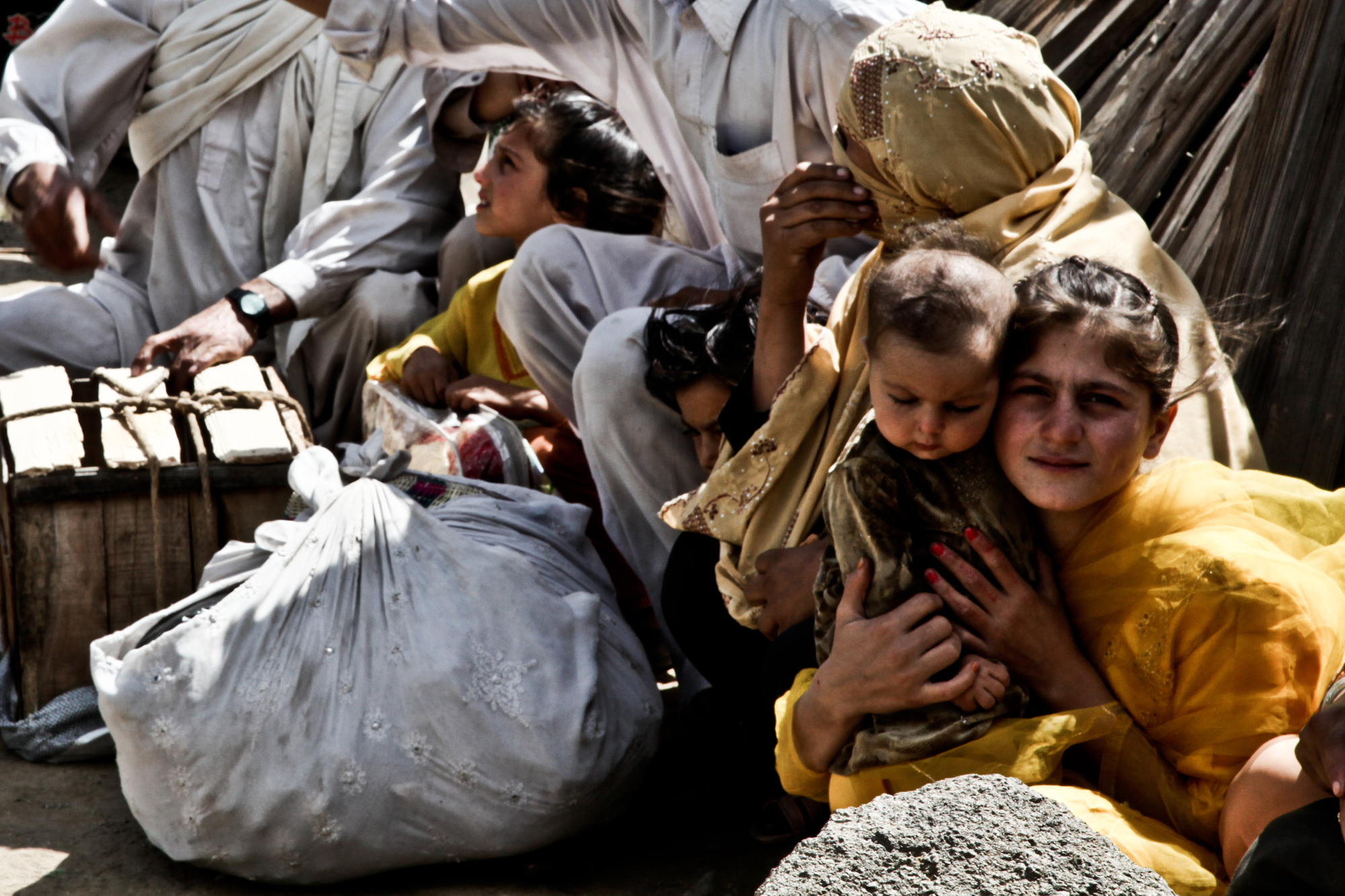
Two of Pakistan's four provinces– Khyber Pakhtunkhwa and Balochistan are regarded to be underdeveloped based on their Human Development Index.

The gender discriminatory practices in Pakistani society also shape the distribution of poverty in the country. Traditional gender roles in Pakistan define the woman's place as in the home and not in the workplace, and define the man as the breadwinner. Consequently, the society invests far less in women than men. Women in Pakistan suffer from poverty of opportunities throughout their lives. Female literacy in Pakistan is 52.85% compared to Male literacy at 68%. In legislative bodies, women constituted less than 3% of the legislature elected on general seats before 2002. The 1973 Constitution allowed reserved seats for women in both houses of parliament for a period of 20 years, thus ensuring that women would be represented in parliament regardless of whether or not they are elected on general seats. This provision lapsed in 1993, so parliaments elected subsequently did not have reserved seats for women. Reserved seats for women have been restored after the election of 2002 .Now women have 20% seats reserved for them in Parliament. According to the United Nations Human Development Report, Pakistan's human development indicators, especially those for women, fall significantly below those of countries with comparable levels of per-capita income. Pakistan also has a higher infant mortality rate (88 per 1000) than the South Asian average (83 per 1000).

== Economic and social vulnerability ==
Un-Employment Rates
Administrative Unit	1998 Census			1981 Census
Administrative Unit	Both Sexes	Male	Female	1981 Census
Pakistan	19.68	20.19	5.05	3.1
Rural	19.98	20.40	5.50	2.3
Urban	19.13	19.77	4.49	5.2
Khyber Pakhtunkhwa	26.83	27.51	2.58	2.2
Rural	28.16	28.64	4.00	2.0
Urban	21.00	22.34	0.74	3.7
Punjab	19.10	19.60	5.50	3.2
Rural	18.60	19.00	6.00	2.5
Urban	20.10	20.7	4.70	5.0
Sindh	14.43	14.86	4.69	3.3
Rural	11.95	12.26	3.70	1.6
Urban	16.75	17.31	5.40	5.8
Balochistan	33.48	34.14	8.67	3.1
Rural	35.26	35.92	9.81	3.0
Urban	27.67	28.33	5.35	4.0
Islamabad	15.70	16.80	1.70	10.7
Rural	28.70	29.40	8.20	13.5
Urban	10.10	11.00	0.80	9.0
Unemployment Rate: It is the percentage of persons unemployed (those looking for work and temporarily laid off) to the total economically active population (10 years and above). Source:

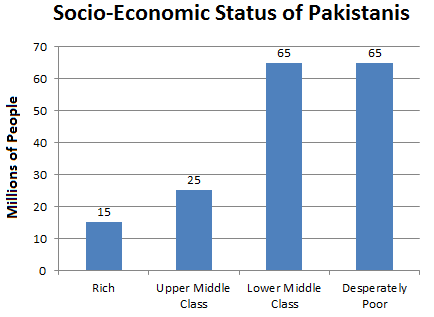
Socio-Economic Status of Pakistanis, source:

"Vulnerability" in this case stands for the underlying susceptibility of economically deprived people to fall into poverty as a result of exogenous random shocks. Vulnerable households are generally found to have low expenditure levels. Households are considered vulnerable if they do not have the means to smooth out their expenses in response to changes in income. In general, vulnerability is likely to be high in households clustered around the poverty line. Since coping strategies for vulnerable households depend primarily on their sources of income, exogenous shocks can increase reliance on non-agricultural wages. Such diversification has not occurred in many parts of Pakistan, leading to an increased dependence on credit.

Due to this economic vulnerability, a large portion of Pakistan’s population is unable to access or qualify for credit and loans through traditional banking institutions. Furthermore, the majority of major banking institutions are concentrated primarily urban areas are unable to reach the large populations living within these rural areas.

While economic vulnerability is a key factor in the rise of poverty in Pakistan, vulnerability also arises from social powerlessness, political disenfranchisement, and ill-functioning and distortionary institutions, and these also are important causes of the persistence of vulnerability among the poor.

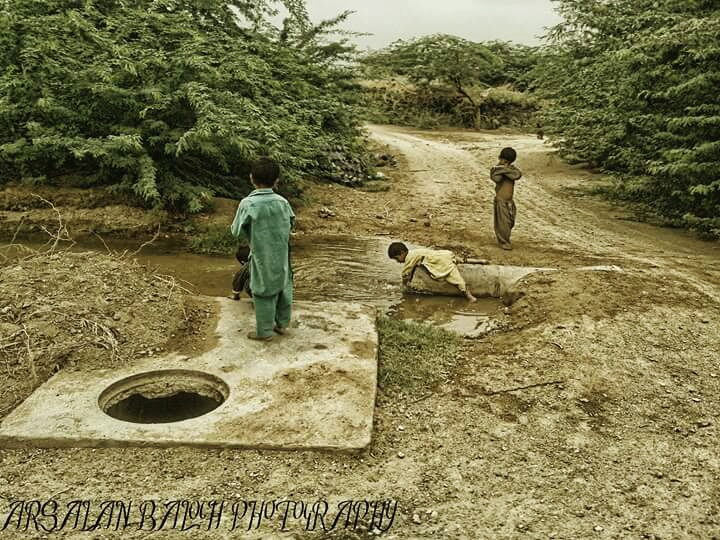
Kids playing in dirty water.

Other causes of vulnerability in Pakistan are the everyday harassment by corrupt government officials, as well as their underperformance, exclusion and denial of basic rights to many in Pakistan. Also, lack of adequate health care by the state lead the poor to seek private sources, which are expensive, but still preferable to the possibility of medical malpractice and being given expired medicines in state run medical facilities. Also, the failure by the state to provide adequate law and order in many parts of the country is a factor in the rise of vulnerability of the poor.

== Environmental issues ==
Environmental problems in Pakistan, such as erosion, use of agro-chemicals, deforestation etc. contribute to rising poverty in Pakistan. Increasing pollution contributes to increasing risk of toxicity, and poor industrial standards in the country contribute to rising pollution.

== Lack of adequate governance ==
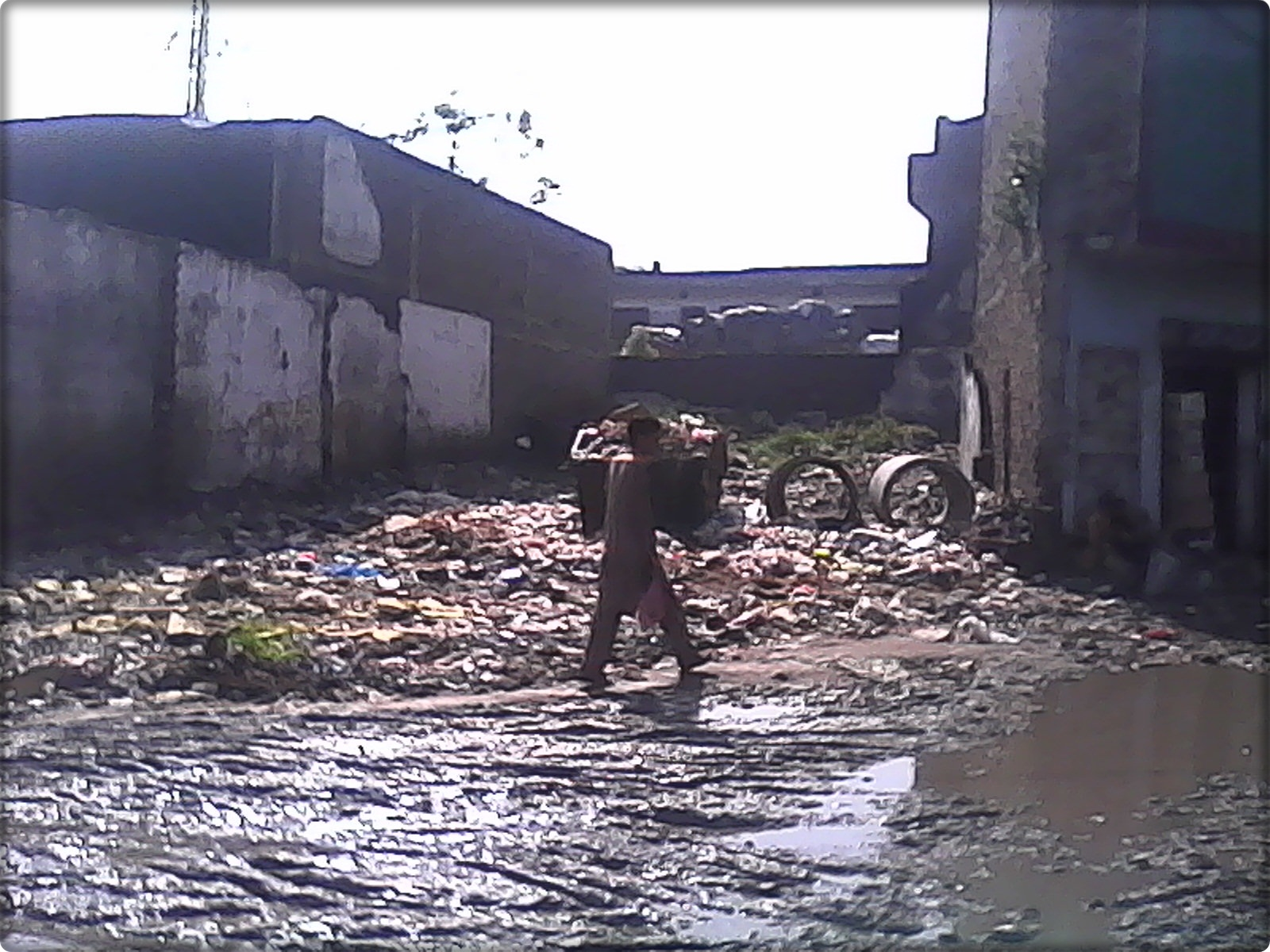
Pakistan suffers from poor public infrastructure

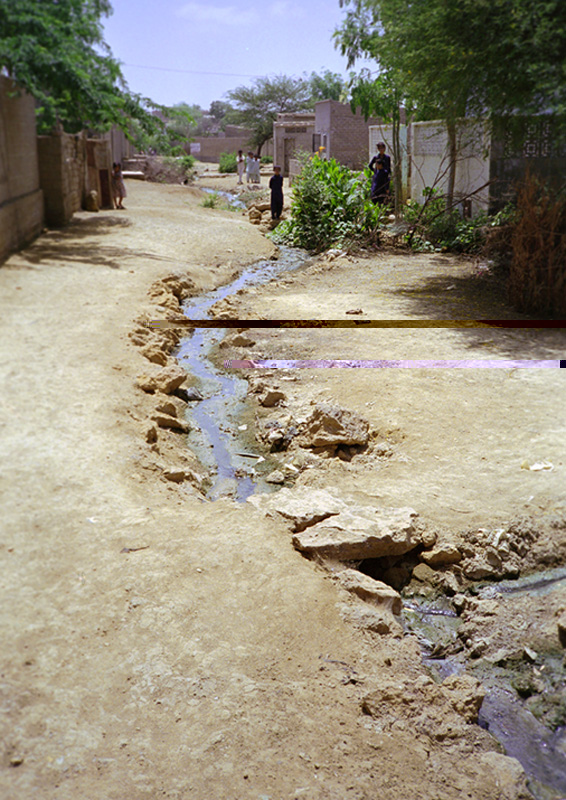
A road in a Karachi slum.

By the end of the 1990s, the manner in which power is exercised in the management of a country's social and economic status resources for development emerged as Pakistan's foremost developmental problem. Corruption and political instabilities such as the insurgency in Balochistan and decade long armed conflict with the Taliban in Waziristan region resulted in reduction of business confidence, deterioration of economic growth, reduced public expenditure, poor delivery of public services, and undermining of the rule of law. The security threat on the border with India has dominated Pakistan's culture and has led to the domination of military in politics, excessive spending on defense at the expense of social sectors, and the erosion of law and order, in conjunction with several implementations of martial law and approximately four coup d'états in the past fifty years. However, over eleven million people were lifted out of poverty under Zia ul Haq's regime, mainly due to agricultural modernization, Zakat policies, and foreign aid.

Pakistan has been run by military dictatorships for large periods of time, alternating with limited democracy. These rapid changes in governments led to rapid policy changes and reversals and the reduction of transparency and accountability in government. The onset of military regimes have contributed to non-transparency in resource allocation. Those who do not constitute the political elite are unable to make political leaders and the Government responsive to their needs or accountable to promises. Development priorities are determined not by potential beneficiaries but by the bureaucracy and a political elite which may or may not be in touch with the needs of the citizens. Political instability and macroeconomic imbalances have been reflected in poor creditworthiness ratings, even compared to other countries of similar income levels, with resulting capital flight and lower foreign direct investment inflows. The current government of Pakistan has professed commitments to reforms in this area.

In addition, Pakistan's major cities and urban centres are home to an estimated 1.2 million street children. This includes beggars and scavengers who are often very young. The law and order problem worsens their condition as boys and girls are fair game to others who would force them into stealing, scavenging and smuggling to survive. A large proportion consumes readily available solvents to starve off hunger, loneliness and fear. Children are vulnerable to contracting STDs such as HIV/AIDS, as well as other diseases.

== Feudalism ==
Pakistan is home to a large feudal landholding system where landholding families hold thousands of acres and do little work on the agriculture themselves. Since, feudalism is rampant in such areas, people cannot acquire and hold land, which is one of the main sources of livelihood in rural agricultural areas of Pakistan. They enlist the services of their serfs to perform the labour of the land. 51% of poor tenants owe money to the landlords. The landlords' position of power allows them to exploit the only resource the poor can possibly provide: their own labour.

== Inequality and natural disasters ==
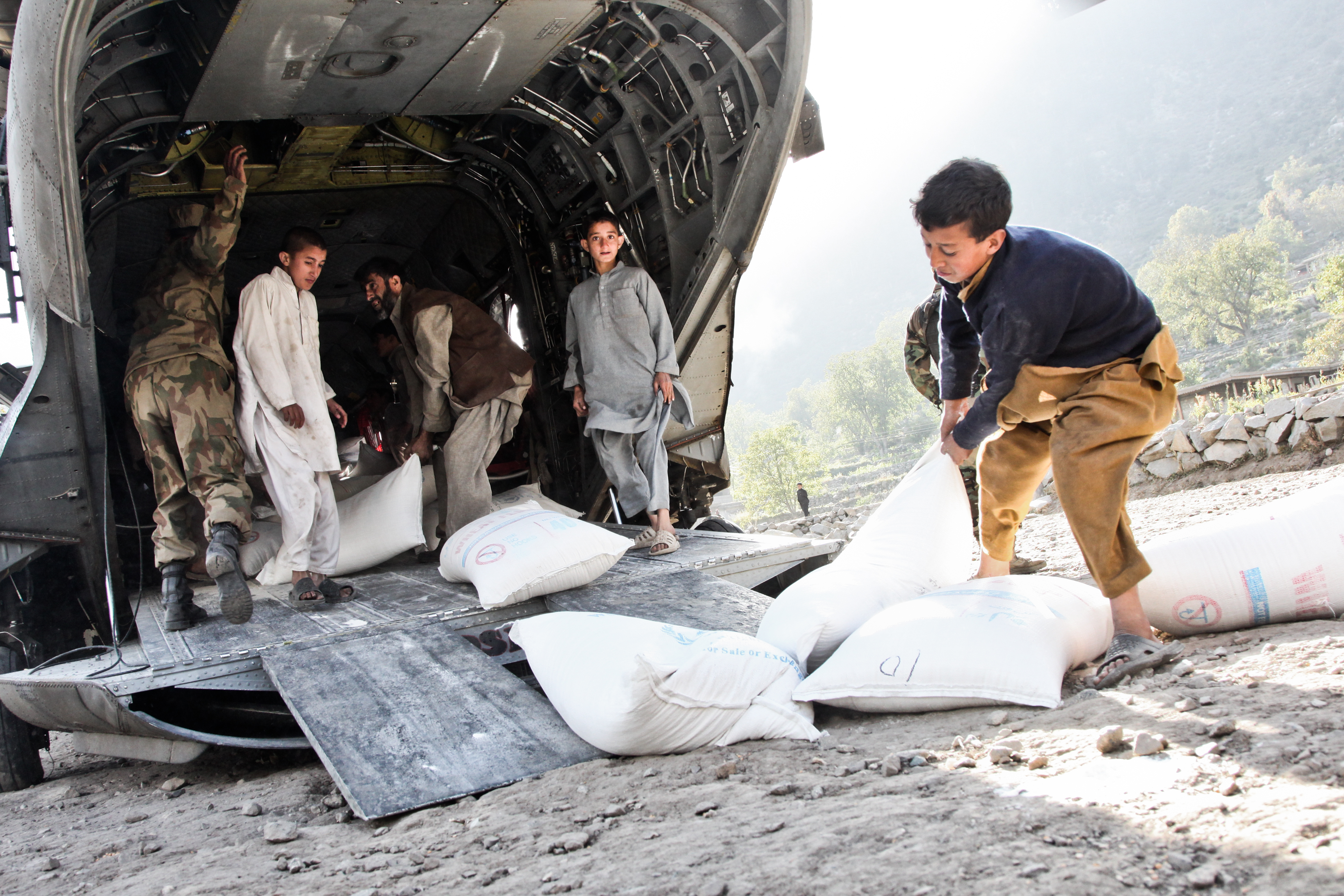
Pakistanis receiving humanitarian aid from US Army in the aftermath of the 2010 floods.

The 2010 Pakistan floods accentuated differences between the wealthy and poor in Pakistan. Abdullah Hussain Haroon, Pakistan's diplomat to the United Nations, alleged that wealthy feudal warlords and landowners in Pakistan have been diverting funds and resources away from the poor and into their own private relief efforts. Haroon also alluded to evidence that landowners had allowed embankments to burst, leading to water flowing away from their land. Pakistan is the sixth most populous country in the world, 60% of its inhabitants are under the age of thirty. The floods have accentuated the sharp divisions in Pakistan between the wealthy and the poor. The wealthy, with better access to transportation and other facilities, have suffered far less than the poor of Pakistan.

== See also ==
- Poverty by country
- Family planning in Pakistan
- Corruption in Pakistan
- Begging in Pakistan
