= Customs Public School =

Coordinates: 31°31′46.1″N 74°20′55.5″E

- 52-A main Gulberg III, Lahore; Pakistan

Information
- School type: Private
- Motto: Education with a Difference
- Opened: 1982
- Status: Open
- Sister school: Customs Public School, Karachi
- School board: BISE, Lahore
- Authority: Pakistan Customs
- Principal: Tayyaba Qureshi
- Faculty: 35
- Employees: 20
- Gender: Co-Education
- Enrollment: 15000
- Education system: Cambridge University Press
- Classes offered: Primary, Middle, Matriculation, GCE
- Language: English
- Schedule type: Private
- Schedule: Day school
- Campuses: Boys Branch & Girls Branch
- Campus type: Urban
- Houses: Jinnah House, Iqbal House, Tipu House, Sir Syed House
- Slogan: Education with a difference
- Mascot: CPS Eagle
- Communities served: Muslims, Christians, Hindu and Sikhs
- Graduates: 28000

Customs Public School (Urdu: کسٹمز پبلک اسکول), or CPS, was established in 1982 through the joint efforts of Pakistan Customs and Central Excise Lahore. It is a private school located in Gulberg, Lahore, Punjab, Pakistan. The school offers primary education, secondary education, matriculation, and British systems of education, including GCE (O-Level and A-Level). Admission is granted based on an entrance test and an interview. CPS has a Junior Branch, a Boys' Branch, and a Girls' Branch. The school is recognized by the Board of Intermediate and Secondary Education, Lahore, and is considered one of the most prestigious institutions in Lahore.

== History ==
Established by Pakistan Customs in 1982 and inaugurated by Mian Nazir Azhar, Customs collector Lahore Division at that time, as an English school. Customs Public School is one of pioneer institutes for the Cambridge regulated international GCE programs in Lahore.

Customs Public School also provided lunch, stationery and transportation for free to all students till 2012 when the school was hit by a financial crisis.

== Branches ==
Customs Public School operates three branches, located at 52-A, Main Gulberg Lahore.

The Junior Branch, also known as School No. 1, is staffed with a team of experts in education who provide guidance to children from Nursery to Class IV. This branch is dedicated to guiding children towards a future career path that is best suited to their aptitude.

The Boys Wing, or School No. II, provides coaching services for boys from Class V to Class X in the Matriculation Stream, as well as for both boys and girls in O Levels. Meanwhile, the Girls Wing, or School No. III, is an exclusively girls' branch catering to students from Class V to Class X in the Matriculation stream.

== Co-curricular activities ==
The Customs Public School offers a range of facilities and extra-curricular activities to engage students in various areas of interest. One of the notable events is the Annual Drama Festival, where students showcase their talents in enacting plays of famous playwrights. The school also hosts an Annual Sports Day, which aims to promote physical fitness and sportsmanship among students. Students who excel in these events are awarded certificates, trophies, and medals. In addition, the school administration provides opportunities for students to participate in outdoor activities such as scouting, trekking, rock climbing, skating, and water sports.

The school also holds an Annual Art and Science Exhibition, which encourages students to showcase their creativity through various mediums. Students also participate in art and science exhibitions arranged by other institutions and art councils.

Music is also emphasized at the school, with the services of an experienced Music Teacher provided to foster an appreciation for music among students. The school regularly sends newsletters to parents to keep them informed about current activities and forthcoming events. Additionally, students contribute articles on different topics for the school magazine, "CUSTOMAG."

== Societies and student clubs ==
Various school societies have been formed to prepare students for different co-curricular activities such as debates and quiz programs. These societies work under the supervision of teachers and include the Scientific Society, Debating Society, Islamic Society, and Dramatic Society. All co-curricular and extra-curricular activities are conducted on an inter-house basis to promote a healthy competitive environment.

== Notable alumni ==
- Shae Gil, Singer
- Wahaj Ali, TV Actor
