= Pakistani rug =

Type of handmade carpet native to Pakistan

A Pakistani rug (Urdu: پاکستانی قالین, romanized: Pakistani Qaleen), also known as Pakistani carpet (Urdu: پاکستانی فرش, romanized: Pakistani Farsh), is a type of handmade floor-covering heavy textile traditionally made in Pakistan and is used for a wide variety of utilitarian and symbolic purposes. Rug/carpet weaving is an essential part of Pakistani culture and Pakistani art.

== History ==
The art of weaving developed in the region comprising Pakistan at a time when few other civilizations employed it. Excavations at Moenjodaro and Harappa - ancient cities of the Indus Valley civilization - have established that the inhabitants used spindles and spun a wide variety of weaving materials. Some historians consider that the Indus Valley civilization first developed the use of woven textiles.

Carpet weaving may have been introduced into the area of present-day Pakistan as far back as the eleventh century with the coming of the first Muslim conquerors, the Turkic Ghaznavids and the Afghan Ghaurids. It can with more certainty be traced to the beginning of the Mughal Dynasty in the early sixteenth century, when the last successor of Timur, Babur, extended his rule from Kabul, Afghanistan to Dhaka, Bangladesh and founded the Mughal Empire. Under the patronage of the Mughals, local craftsmen adopted Persian techniques and designs. Carpets woven in the Punjab at that time (often called Lahore carpets today) made use of motifs and decorative styles found in Mughal architecture.

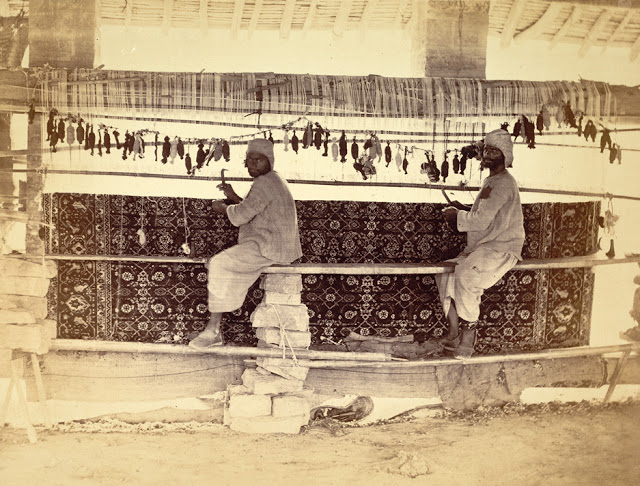
Rug/carpet Weavers in Karachi Jail - 1873

During the Mughal period, the carpets made on the South Asia became so famous that demand for them spread abroad. These carpets boasted distinctive designs and high knot densities. Carpets made for the Mughal emperors, including Jahangir and Shah Jahan, were of the finest quality. Under Shah Jahan's reign, Mughal carpet-weaving took on a new aesthetic and entered its classical phase.

The carpets woven in Lahore were the first to reach European markets, including England, as far back as Seventeenth century. During the British colonial era, prison weaving was established in district and female jails in cities such as Lahore and Karachi. Carpet-weaving outside of jails was revived after the independence when Pakistan's carpet-weaving industry flourished.

At present, Pakistani rug is one of the country's leading export products. Hand-knotted rug manufacture is Pakistan's second-largest cottage and small industry. The craftsmen have the capacity to produce any type of carpet using all the popular motifs of guls, medallions, paisleys (botehs), traceries, and geometric designs in various combinations.

== Types of Pakistani rugs ==
- Pak Persian

Persian-inspired curvilinear and/or floral designs, usually styled from old Kashan, Kirman, Isfahan, Tabriz, Hunting, Tree of Life, Mahal and Sultanabad rugs. Woven with Senneh (Persian) knot.

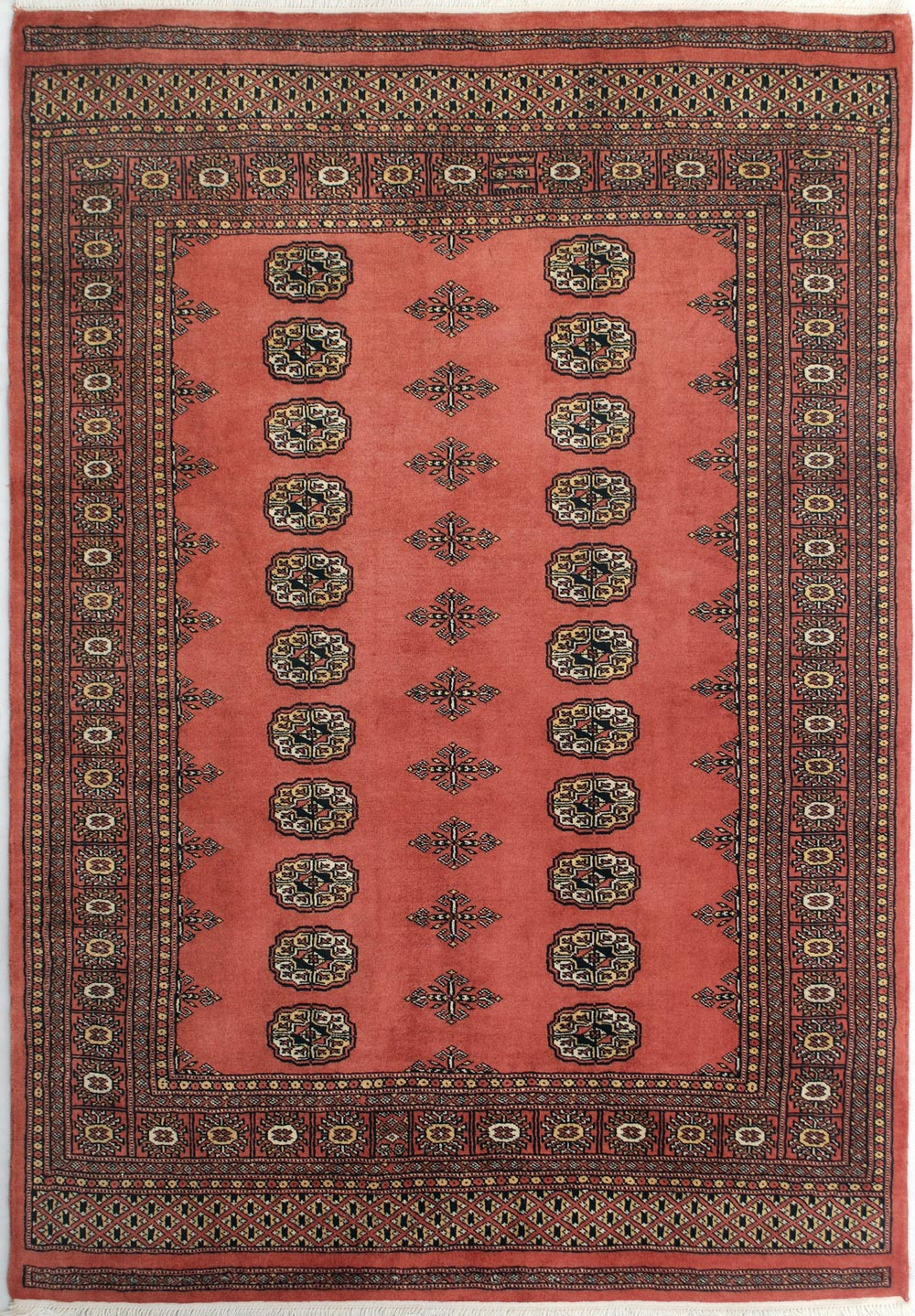
Pakistani Bokhara rug

- Bokhara

Ghiordes (Turkish) knot, geometric Tekke design. Pakistani Bokhara rugs are woven in many colors, ranging from classical reds to vibrant greens and golds.

- Jaldar

Inspired from traditional Sarouk and Yamud designs that originated in Pakistan; it employs diamond-shaped gul motif repeated in rows. woven with Ghiordes knot.

- Pak Gabbeh

A Pak Gabbeh is very similar in character to Persian Gabbeh and has modern contemporary designs. Normally woven with handspun wool and vegetable with both Senneh and Ghiordes knot.

- Chobi

Often referred as Ziegler, Oushak or Peshawar, Chobi rugs employ handspun wool and natural dyes. Floral patterns and usually woven with Senneh knot in Pakistan.

- Caucasian

Traditional geometric design of Caucasus. Ghiordes knot.

- Shal

Derived from traditional shawl designs of old Persia.

- Lahore

Lahore became a prominent weaving center during the time of British rule, and they furthered the traditional weaving through various means including weaving rugs in Lahore's jail. Most of the rugs produced at that time are commonly referred as Lahore rugs.

- Dhurrie

Dhurrie is a type of flat-woven rug traditionally woven with wool and cotton in most parts of Pakistan.

== Weaving centers ==
Today, hand-knotted carpets are produced all over Pakistan with major centers established around bigger cities.

=== Balochistan ===
- Quetta

=== Gilgit-Baltistan ===
- Gilgit

=== Khyber Pakhtunkhwa ===
- Nowshera
- Haripur
- Peshawar
- Rasakai
- Swabi
- Swat (Islampur)

=== Punjab ===
- Attock
- Bahawalpur
- Daska
- Dera Ghazi Khan
- Faisalabad
- Farooqabad
- Gojra
- Gujranwala
- Hafizabad
- Jaranwala
- Kamalia
- Kamoke
- Lahore
- Lodhran
- Multan
- Muridke
- Narowal
- Okara
- Raiwind
- Sangla Hill
- Shakargarh
- Sheikhupura
- Sialkot
- Toba Tek Singh

=== Sindh ===
- Gambat
- Hyderabad
- Hala
- Islamkot
- Karachi
- Khadro
- Mehrabpur
- Mirpur Khas
- Mithi
- Nawabshah
- Nasarpur
- Rohri
- Sanghar
- Sukkur
- Tando Adam
- Tharparkar
- Umerkot

== See also ==
- Afghan carpet
- Oriental rug
- Pakistan Carpet Manufacturers and Exporters Association
