= Human trafficking in Pakistan =

In 2017 Pakistan was a source, transit, and destination country for men, women, and children subjected to trafficking in persons, specifically forced labour and prostitution. The largest human trafficking problem was bonded labour, concentrated in the Sindh and Punjab provinces in agriculture and brick making, and to a lesser extent in mining and carpet-making. Estimates of bonded labour victims, including men, women, and children, vary widely, but were likely well over one million. In extreme scenarios, when labourers speak publicly against abuse, landowners have kidnapped labourers and their family members.

The U.S. State Department's Office to Monitor and Combat Trafficking in Persons placed the country in "Tier 2 Watchlist" in 2017. The country was placed at Tier 2 in 2023.

In 2021, the Organised Crime Index gave the country a score of 8 out of 10 for human trafficking, noting that most trafficking was internal and organised by Chinese groups.

The country ratified the 2000 UN TIP Protocol in November 2022.

== Trafficking of children ==
Boys and girls are also bought, sold, rented, or kidnapped to work in organized, illegal begging rings, domestic servitude, prostitution, and in agriculture in bonded labour. Illegal labour agents charge high fees to parents with false promises of decent work for their children, who are later exploited and subject to forced labour in domestic servitude, unskilled labour, small shops and other sectors. Agents who had previously trafficked children for camel jockeying in the United Arab Emirates (UAE) were not convicted and continue to engage in child trafficking. Girls and women are also sold into forced marriages; in some cases their new "husbands" move them across Pakistani borders and force them into prostitution.

NGOs and police reported markets in Pakistan where girls and women are bought and sold for sex and labour. Non-state militant groups kidnap children or coerce parents with fraudulent promises into giving away children as young as 12 to spy, fight, or die as suicide bombers. The militants often sexually and physically abuse the children and use psychological coercion to convince the children that the acts they commit are justified. The smuggling of women and children from Pakistan has been a steady practice. There are multiple forms of domestic human trafficking but in Pakistan sexual exploitation and bonded labour are more common. These types of trafficking are driven by poverty and a natural desire to escape it. Human trafficking is extensive in scale and scope and happens most of the time unnoticed all across Pakistan.

== Abuse ==
In 2010, many Pakistani women and men migrated voluntarily to the Persian Gulf States, China, Indonesia, Norway, Turkey, the United Kingdom, and other European countries for low-skilled employment such as domestic work, driving or construction work; once abroad, some became victims of labour trafficking. False job offers and high fees charged by illegal labour agents or sub-agents of licensed Pakistani Overseas Employment Promoters increased Pakistani labourers’ vulnerabilities and some labourers abroad found themselves in involuntary servitude or debt bondage. Employers abroad used practices including restrictions on movement, non-payment of wages, threats, and physical or sexual abuse. Moreover, traffickers used violence, psychological coercion and isolation, often seizing travel and identification documents, to force Pakistani women and girls into prostitution in the Middle East and Europe. There were reports of child and sex trafficking between Iran and Pakistan; Pakistan was a destination for men, women and children from Afghanistan, Azerbaijan and Iran who are subjected to forced labour and prostitution.

In 2010 the Government of Pakistan did not fully comply with the minimum standards for the elimination of human trafficking, but made significant efforts to do so. The government’s prosecutions of transnational labour trafficking offenders and substantive efforts to prevent and combat bonded labour – a form of human trafficking – demonstrated increased commitment, but there were no criminal convictions of bonded labour offenders or officials who facilitated trafficking in persons. It also continued to lack adequate procedures to identify trafficking victims among vulnerable populations and to protect these victims. The government’s lacklustre attitude towards the issue is worrisome because nearly half of the population of Pakistan constitutes women of which a large proportion is threatened by traffickers. Even women that have been retrieved from trafficking networks face the risk of re-victimisation due to a lack of protection and general awareness amongst society.

== Prosecution (2010) ==
The Government of Pakistan made progress in law enforcement efforts to combat human trafficking in 2009. While the lack of comprehensive internal anti-trafficking laws hindered law enforcement efforts, a number of other laws were used to address some of these crimes. Several sections in the Pakistan Penal Code, as well as provincial laws, criminalize forms of human trafficking such as slavery, selling a child for prostitution, and unlawful compulsory labour, with prescribed offences ranging from fines to life imprisonment. Pakistan prohibits all forms of transnational trafficking in persons with the Prevention and Control of Human Trafficking Ordinance (PACHTO); the penalties range from seven to 14 years’ imprisonment. Government officials and civil society report that judges have difficulty applying PACHTO and awarding sufficiently stringent punishments, because of confusion over definitions and similar offences in the Pakistan Penal Code.

In addition, the Bonded Labour (System) Abolition Act (BLAA) prohibits bonded labour, with prescribed penalties ranging from two to five years’ imprisonment, a fine, or both. Pakistani officials have yet to record a single conviction and have indicated the need to review and amend the BLAA. Prescribed penalties for above offences vary widely; some are sufficiently stringent and commensurate with those for other serious crimes such as rape. Others – with minimum sentencing of a fine or less than a year in prison – are not sufficiently stringent.

During 2009, the government convicted 385 criminals under PACHTO – 357 more than 2008. The government did not disclose the punishments given to the trafficking offenders. Reported sentences under this law in previous years were not sufficiently stringent. Moreover, despite reports of transnational sex trafficking, the FIA reported fewer than a dozen such cases under PACHTO. Government officials also often conflated human smuggling and human trafficking, particularly in public statements and data reported to the media.

In 2009, Pakistan reported 2,894 prosecutions and 166 convictions under the vagrancy ordinances and various penal code sections which authorities sometimes use to prosecute trafficking offences; it is unclear how many of these prosecutions and convictions involved trafficking. It is confirmed that the government convicted at least three child traffickers; it is unknown whether these convictions were for forced prostitution or labour and what the imposed penalties were. The government prosecuted at least 500 traffickers: 416 for sex trafficking, 33 for labour trafficking, and 51 for either sex or labour trafficking. Only one person was prosecuted under the Bonded Labour System Abolition Act, with no conviction.

Some feudal landlords are affiliated with political parties or are officials themselves and use their social, economic and political influence to protect their involvement in bonded labour. Furthermore, police lack the personnel, training and equipment to confront landlords’ armed guards when freeing bonded labours. Additionally, media and NGOs reported that some police received bribes from brothel owners, landowners, and factory owners who subject Pakistanis to forced labour or prostitution, in exchange for police to ignore these illegal human trafficking activities.

In 2009, 108 officials were disciplined, 34 given minor punishments, four permanently removed, and one was compulsorily retired for participating in illegal migration and human smuggling; some of these officials may have facilitated human trafficking.

In efforts to enhance victim identification practices, FIA officials and more than 250 law enforcement officers participated in anti-human trafficking training in 2009, provided in partnership with NGOs and governments of other countries. Various Pakistani government agencies provided venue space, materials, and travel and daily allowances, and law enforcement officers led and taught some of the training workshops. Police and FIA officials continued to receive anti-trafficking training in their respective training academies.

== Protection (2010) ==
The Government of Pakistan made some progress in its efforts to protect victims of human trafficking. The government continued to lack adequate procedures and resources for pro-actively identifying victims of trafficking among vulnerable persons with whom they come in contact, especially child labourers, women and children in prostitution, and agricultural and brick kiln workers.

The FIA and the police referred vulnerable men, women and children, many of whom were trafficking victims, to federal and provincial government shelters and numerous NGO-operated care centres. There are reports, however, that women were abused in some government-run shelters. Shelters also faced resource challenges and were sometimes crowded and under-staffed. Sindh provincial police freed over 2,000 bonded labourers in 2009 from feudal landlords; few charges were filed against the employers. The FIA expanded protection services overseas and provided medical and psychological services to Pakistani trafficking victims in Oman. Some NGOs provided food, legal, medical, and psychological care to vulnerable children, including child trafficking victims, in facilities provided by and partially staffed by the Government of Pakistan. Some NGOs and government shelters, like the Punjab Child Protection and Welfare Bureau, also rehabilitated and reunited children with their families. Female trafficking victims could access 26 government-run Shaheed Benazir Bhutto Centres and the numerous provincial government “Darul Aman” centres offering medical treatment, vocational training, and legal assistance. In September 2009, the government opened a rehabilitation centre in Swat, which included a team of doctors and psychiatrists, to assist child soldiers rescued from militants.

== Bonded labourers (2010) ==
The federal government, as part of its National Plan of Action for Abolition of Bonded Labour and Rehabilitation of Freed Bonded Labourers, continued to provide legal aid to bonded labourers in Punjab and Khyber-Pakhtunkhwa (formerly the North West Frontier Province), and expanded services to Balochistan and Sindh provinces. The Sindh provincial government continued to implement its $116,000 project (launched in 2005) which provided state-owned land for housing camps and constructed 75 low-cost housing units for freed bonded labourer families.

The government encouraged foreign victims to participate in investigations against their traffickers by giving them the option of early statement recording and repatriation or, if their presence was required for the trial, by permitting them to seek employment. During 2009, all foreign victims opted for early statement recording and did not have to wait for or testify during the trial. The government did not provide foreign victims with legal alternatives to removal to countries where they may face hardship or retribution. Foreign victims reportedly were not prosecuted or deported for unlawful acts committed as a direct result of being trafficked. Not all trafficking victims were identified and adequately protected. Pakistani adults deported from other countries, some of whom may have been trafficking victims, were fined up to $95, higher than one month’s minimum wages. Due to lack of sufficient shelter space and resources, police sometimes had to keep freed bonded labourers in the police station for one night before presenting them to a judge the next day.

During 2009, the Government of Pakistan completed a four-year project to repatriate and rehabilitate child camel jockeys who had been trafficked to the United Arab Emirates. The federal and provincial governments also collaborated with NGOs and international organizations to provide training on human trafficking, including victim identification, protective services, and application of laws.

== Prevention (2010) ==
The Pakistani government made progress in its efforts to prevent human trafficking. The Punjab provincial government continued implementation of its $1.4 million project, Elimination of Bonded Labour in Brick Kilns (launched in 2008). To date, this project helped nearly 6,000 bonded labourers obtain Computerized National Identification Cards, in collaboration with the government National Database and Registration Authority. It has also provided $140,000 in no-interest loans to help free labourers from debt and established 60 on-site schools that educated over 1,500 children of brick kiln labourers.

The Bureau of Emigration continued to give pre-departure country-specific briefings to every Pakistani who travelled abroad legally for work; these briefings included information on how to obtain assistance overseas. The Punjab Child Protection and Welfare Bureau continued to fund 20 community organizations aimed at preventing child labour trafficking. The federal and provincial governments developed and began implementation of the Child Protection Management Information System, a national monitoring system that collects district-level data in five thematic areas, including child trafficking.

In 2009, all 250 Pakistani UN Peacekeeping Mission forces received training in various government training academies that included combating human trafficking. The government also took measures to reduce the demand for commercial sex acts, some of which may have been forced prostitution, by prosecuting, but not convicting, at least 64 clients of prostitution. Government officials also participated in and led various public events on human trafficking during the reporting period. In February 2010, the federal government hosted an inter-agency conference for more than 30 federal and provincial officials that focused on practices for identifying and combating child trafficking, transnational trafficking, and bonded labour.

== See also ==
- Human rights in Pakistan
- Rape in Pakistan
- Smuggling in Pakistan
- Begging in Pakistan
