= Pakistani economic crisis (2021–2024) =

2021-2024 economic crisis in Pakistan

- The CPI inflation rate in Pakistan from January 2021 to December 2025.
- Date: 2021 – 2024
- Location: Pakistan
- Type: Economic crisis
- Cause: Excessive external borrowing; Decades of poor governance; Low productivity per capita; Cost of living crisis; Rising fuel prices due to the Russian invasion of Ukraine; 2022 Pakistan floods; Political instability; Balance of payments crisis
- Outcome: Severe economic challenges; rise in food, gas and oil prices; Economy largely stabilized by 2025; recovery continues

Foreign reserves held by the State Bank of Pakistan between January 2021 and December 2025.

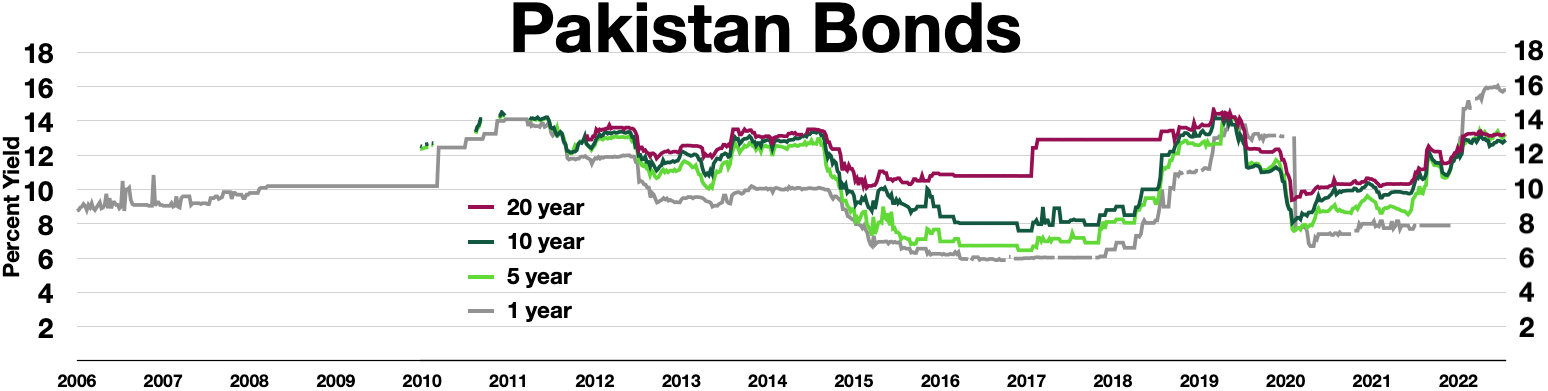
Pakistan bonds Inverted yield curve in 2019-2020 and 2022 20 year 10 year 5 year 1 year

Pakistan experienced an economic crisis beginning in late 2021 during the premiership of Imran Khan in the aftermath of the COVID-19 crisis, further intensified by the effects of the 2022 Russian invasion of Ukraine, political unrest in the country, and devastating floods in 2022. It caused severe economic challenges for years, including surging inflation causing food, gas, and oil prices to rise; fuel shortages; a substantial weakening of the rupee; and a balance-of-payments crisis caused by declining foreign reserves. Chronic poor governance and low productivity per capita contributed to the crisis, leaving the country unable to earn enough reserves to fund its imports. In February 2023, foreign reserves held by the state bank declined to an all-time low, covering just over two weeks of imports, while in May 2023, Pakistan's inflation rate reached 37.97%, the highest level ever recorded.

Pakistan's economic crisis served as the biggest crisis since its independence. It was on the verge of a sovereign default in early 2023 for the first time in its peacetime history. The Russian invasion of Ukraine drove up fuel prices worldwide, leading to a global energy crisis. Excessive external borrowing by Pakistan over the years raised the spectre of default, causing the Pakistani rupee to rapidly fall in value and making imports more expensive in relative terms. Fuel shortages and surging inflation in late 2021 contributed to the crisis, and by June 2022, inflation was at an all-time high, along with rising food prices. The 2022 Pakistan floods exacerbated the crisis and caused major economic losses worth $30 billion. The national poverty rate rose significantly as a result of the crisis, going from 21.9% in 2018–2019 to 28.8% in 2024–2025, an increase of about 6.9%.

As of 2025, the Pakistani economy is showing signs of gradual macro-economic recovery and stabilization. In June 2025, Pakistan led emerging markets to become the most-improved country in sovereign credit risk, seeing a 12% decline in default risk. In April 2025, the headline inflation rate hit a historic low of 0.3%, the lowest in Pakistan's history, primarily due to declining global commodity and energy prices, a stable exchange rate, a high base effect, recovering foreign reserves, and tight monetary policy. Total foreign reserves held by the state bank rose to a record high of $16.055 billion in January 2025, and the Pakistani rupee has stabilized at around 280 rupees per dollar since 2023.

== Background ==
Pakistan's debt has significantly increased over the past two decades. In 2000, Pakistan's gross public debt was Rs. 3.1 trillion (~$50 billion). By the time the regime of Pervez Musharraf ended in 2008, that number had almost doubled to Rs 6.1 trillion. Successive Pakistani governments largely continued this trend; the Imran Khan government further increased Pakistan's debt by 77% in less than four years, with public debt standing at Rs. 44.3 trillion by the time its tenure ended in April 2022. While debt increased around 14% per year on average, GDP grew only 3 percent per year on average. This led to an unsustainable debt burden over time. In the fiscal year of 2022–23, the debt servicing obligations of Rs. 5.2 trillion exceeded the entire federal government's revenue. In 2022, Pakistan experienced a trifecta of challenges, as political unrest, economic crisis, and destructive floods gripped the nation. Economically, the country grappled with severe inflation, a declining currency, and critically low foreign reserves, posing significant concerns for its financial stability.

GDP per capita in India, Pakistan and Bangladesh up to 2018

In the 2010s, Pakistan's high domestic consumption and demand, pegged rupee exchange rate, import-led growth, low inflation and increased government spending on infrastructure projects such as the China–Pakistan Economic Corridor (CPEC) led to a balance-of-payments crisis, as foreign exchange outflows increased rapidly. This led the government of Pakistan to approach the International Monetary Fund (IMF) in October 2018, where it raised interest rates, depreciated the rupee and implemented tax measures in the 2019–20 federal budget to meet the preconditions of the IMF programme. In June 2019, the federal government and the IMF agreed on a $6 billion bailout package in a 39-month extended fund arrangement. Analyst Michael Kugelman called it a "political blow" for the government.

In January 2020, the IMF package was put on hold after Prime Minister Imran Khan "did not follow IMF recommendations to increase electricity prices and impose additional taxes". In 2021, the bailout programme was resumed after Pakistan agreed to the withdrawal of subsidies and tax exemptions, an increase in the petroleum levy, an increase in the energy tariff, and the auditing of COVID-19 relief funds.

After the government reintroduced fuel subsidies in February 2022, the Financial Times reported that analysts said the move could "undermine the IMF programme weeks after it restarted". The Business Standard reported that finance minister Miftah Ismail said that the subsidy package was "announced as a 'bomb' to destroy the country's economy for the next administration". Dawn reported that the IMF was not convinced by the government's justifications for the amnesty scheme and relief package, and the move led to the stalling of the $6 billion bailout programme.

During the Imran Khan government, increasing double-digit inflation led to growing political issues and deteriorating economic conditions. During Khan's government, Pakistan's total debt and liabilities increased by 80%, while during three quarters of fiscal year 2021–22, the trade deficit rose 70% to $35.4 billion. Due to high international oil prices, Pakistan's oil import bill increased by 95.9% to $17.03 billion in the last ten months of the Khan government. In February 2022, Pakistan posted its highest-ever monthly current account deficit of $2.55bn. In 2021, The Express Tribune said that the country's circular debt "almost doubled within three years" to Rs. 2.28 trillion "due to the government’s failure to stem systemic losses". According to Business Recorder, Pakistan's foreign reserves were built through a "flawed policy" of "heavier than ever reliance" on borrowing, equity and swap arrangements.

On 9 April 2022, Imran Khan was ousted in a vote of no confidence as the National Assembly elected opposition leader Shehbaz Sharif as prime minister two days later. The new finance minister, Miftah Ismail, said Pakistan would approach the IMF to resume the bailout package for "balance of payment support". Political instability worsened the country's economic condition; with further outflows from foreign reserves and currency devaluations occurring soon after the arrival of the Shahbaz Sharif government, the rupee hit an all-time low in May as well. To qualify for resuming the IMF programme, the government announced fuel price hikes. The Pakistani military, led by Field Marshal Asim Munir, also intervened to support the Sharif government's efforts to rescue the economy from crisis. The military also played a major role in setting up the Special Investment Facilitation Council (SIFC), an official body tasked with attracting foreign investment to support the economic recovery.

From June to October 2022, floods led to $40 billion in economic losses to the country; 33 million individuals were affected, 7.9 million were displaced, and 10.5 million people faced acute food insecurity. More than 1.2 million head of livestock were killed, 13,000 km of roads and bridges damaged, and 9.4 million acres of cropland were flooded. At the same time, the UNDP reported 9 million individuals "at-risk of being pushed into poverty on top of the 33 million affected".

== Timeline ==
=== 2021 ===
In 2021, during the premiership of Imran Khan, Pakistan experienced surging inflation, reaching 12.3% in December, and a simultaneously weakening rupee. The country also experienced major fuel price hikes and acute gas supply shortages, with fuel supplies temporarily halted to industries and CNG stations during the peak of the gas crisis. Foreign reserves began declining significantly while debt to foreign bodies and countries, particularly China, rose substantially.

In January 2021, there was a natural gas shortage of 800 million cubic feet per day (mmcfd) and a shortage of 600mmcfd the next month. This led the Cabinet Committee on Energy to curtail gas supply to the transport sector. Dawn said that Pakistan was "on the verge of a massive gas crunch". Information Minister Fawad Chaudhry said that the country would "have no gas in years to come", stating that gas had been depleting 9% for the past two years.

Two state-owned companies announced the cessation of gas supply to industries in July due to shortages and dry-docking delays. Economic commentator Khurram Husain said it was "the third time in three years that liquefied natural gas imports will be mismanaged. This will impact not only gas supplies to consumers and industry but also the price of electricity, the country’s reserves and public debt and likely fuel further inflation." In October, no bidders responded to Pakistan LNG Ltd's December and January tenders, leaving a 400mmcfd shortfall. Amid the gas crisis, the government in November agreed to the costliest-ever liquified natural gas (LNG) import deal with Qatar Petroleum, priced at $30.6 per million British thermal units.

=== 2022 ===
Four days after being elected prime minister, Shehbaz Sharif was told by the Ministry of Energy that 27 power plants with a combined capacity of 7,000 MW were out-of-order due to shortages or lack of maintenance and repair.

Information Minister Maryam Aurangzeb told a news conference held on 19 May 2022 that Pakistan was committed to "controlling rising inflation, stabilizing foreign exchange reserves, strengthening the economy and reducing the country's dependence on imports". The import of unnecessary and luxury items was banned. Sharif had said at the time that the decision would "save the country's precious foreign exchange" and that Pakistan would have to "pursue austerity".

In late May 2022, the government lifted the cap on fuel prices - a condition for advancing the long-stalled bailout deal with the IMF. The IMF also insisted Islamabad raise electricity prices, ramp up tax collection, and make sizeable budget cuts.

Federal Minister for Planning and Development Ahsan Iqbal told reporters on 14 May 2022 that Pakistanis could reduce their tea consumption to "one or two cups" a day as imports were putting additional financial pressure on the government. "The tea we import is imported on credit", Iqbal said, adding that businesses should be shut down first to save electricity. According to the Observatory of Economic Complexity, the South Asian nation of 220 million is the world's largest tea importer, having bought more than $640 million worth of tea in 2020.

Inflation in Pakistan rose to 21.3% in June, the highest since December 2008, when inflation stood at 23.3%.

Finance Minister Miftah Ismail said that a loan of $2.3 billion from a Chinese consortium of banks had been credited to the Pakistani central bank's account in late June.

The 2022 summer floods caused over $30 billion in economic losses in Pakistan.

At the end of March 2022, the State Bank of Pakistan's reserves stood at $11.425bn, but they gradually tanked to an almost four-year low of $6.715bn on 2 December. Pakistan's foreign exchange reserves are equal to just five weeks of merchandise imports.

The consistent depreciation of the rupee is said to be deepening the economic crisis. At the end of March 2022, the rupee's value was at 183.48 to $1. It stopped at 224.40 on 9 December.

=== 2023 ===
In January 2023, Muhammad Aurangzeb, the CEO of Pakistan's largest bank, Habib Bank, commented publicly on the prevailing economic situation, saying it could be a "big blow to the economy" if the stakeholders did not make the right decisions swiftly.

In late January, Pakistan lifted the artificial cap on its currency, causing the rupee to plunge 20% against the dollar in a few days. The government raised fuel prices by 16%. And the Pakistani central bank raised its interest rate by 100 basis points to battle the country's highest inflation in decades, expected to be as high as 26% in January. That month, textile associations claimed that 7 million textile workers were laid off due to low exports and the government's failure to control the economic crisis. Textile associations criticised the government for not having any policy to end the crises faced by textile producers and exporters, and further lambasted the government for importing expensive luxury cars for cabinet members.

In February 2023, a Moody's economist predicted that inflation in Pakistan could average 33% in the first half of the year. China lent Pakistan a further 700 million dollars to shore up Forex reserves. Pakistan's consumer price index (CPI) further jumped to 31.5%, the highest annual rate in 50 years. Also, Fitch downgrades Pakistan's sovereign credit rating from CCC+ to CCC−. The New York-based ratings agency warned that a default could be a "real possibility". On 9 February, foreign reserves held by the State Bank of Pakistan (SBP) declined to an all-time low of $2.92 billion, covering just over two weeks of imports.

In March 2023, the food inflation rate in Pakistan witnessed a significant increase, with urban areas experiencing a rate of 47.1 percent and rural areas facing a slightly higher rate of 50.2 percent. Moody's downgrades Pakistan's rating to Caa3 and changes outlook to stable from negative. Finance Minister Ishaq Dar said that China approved a rollover of a $1.3 billion loan for cash-strapped Pakistan, which would help shore up its depleting foreign exchange reserves. The World Bank further recorded the CPI for food items on a year-on-year basis at 45.1%, the second-highest in South Asia after Sri Lanka. The CPI raced to 35.4 percent in the highest annual rise in record prices, driven mainly by skyrocketing costs of food, electricity, beverages, and transport. The inflation number was the highest annual rate since available data – July 1965 – according to the research firm Arif Habib Ltd and is expected to rise in the upcoming months.

On April 4, the World Bank projected about 4 million Pakistani people falling below the lower middle-income ($3.6/day) poverty line amid economic growth plummeting to just 0.4% against a target of 5%.

In May 2023, Pakistan's inflation rate reached 38%, surpassing Sri Lanka to become the country with highest in Asia.

In June 2023, the Pakistani government unveiled an "Economic Revival Plan" with the support of the military, according to which plans on investments in key areas of production such as agriculture, mining, information technology, defence and the energy sector were discussed. PM Shehbaz Sharif also lauded China for assisting his country in the current economic crisis. The Special Investment Facilitation Council (SIFC) was also formed by the government with the backing of the military and Field Marshal Asim Munir to encourage foreign investment in Pakistan.

=== 2024 ===
The United Nations report in January believed Pakistan's economy to face global challenges in 2024, with modest GDP growth expected.

The situation in Pakistan remains chaotic after the 2024 election, and the Middle East institute forecasts that "Pakistan's economic crisis will continue. According to the Pakistan Bureau of Statistics, the inflation rate stood at more than 29% in January. Pakistan also has to manage roughly $30 billion in annual external debt obligations, as its foreign currency reserves continue to fluctuate. As of Feb. 9, total liquid foreign reserves stood at $13.15 billion, having previously fallen to just $4.1 billion in June 2023. According to State Bank of Pakistan data, Pakistan requires $6.1 billion for debt servicing before the end of the fiscal year (June 30). Its current account deficit stands at $269 million, which could further exacerbate the projected deficit of $6 billion that the government expects, complicating Islamabad’s ability to fulfil its debt obligations." Mid-2024 figures from the country's central bank and international bodies such as the IMF paint a cautiously optimistic economic outlook. The Pakistani government predicts the inflation rate will remain between 12.5 and 11% in June–July. Pakistan's inflation rate was 9.8% in August.

In 2024, Fitch Ratings upgraded Pakistan's credit rating to 'CCC+', while Moody's Ratings upgraded Pakistan to Caa2. In September, the IMF also approved a $7 billion loan to Pakistan after an agreement.

In an article from 30 September in Bloomberg, it was noted that "[f]oreign exchange reserves have strengthened from previously critically low levels, import and currency restrictions that hurt industrial activity have eased. Inflation has also cooled, helping monetary authority to lower borrowing cost by 450 basis points since June this year." At the same time, international bailouts "helped in stabilizing the country". According to the Pakistan Bureau of Statistics (PBS), Pakistan's GDP grew by 3.07% in Q4, FY24, primarily backed by agricultural (6.76%) and services (3.69%) growth, whereas industry (-3.59%) continued to decline, despite a rebound in large-scale manufacturing growth.

In 2024, the Pakistan Stock Exchange's KSE-100 benchmark rose almost 30%, reaching an all-time high of 82,003.59, drawing the highest foreign investment in the stock exchange ($87 million) since 2014. Attributed to SBP rate cuts and an IMF loan. In October 2024, Pakistan also ended a four-year streak of outflows (totalling $1.4 billion) in treasury bills, earning $875 million. According to Bloomberg, Pakistan's stock became the "world's best performer", increasing 73% in the past 12 months. Treasury bill yields became some of Asia's highest, while foreign reserves rose to a two-year high.

== 2024–25 Economic Survey ==
On 10 June 2025, finance minister Muhammad Aurangzeb presented the Economic Survey 2024–25, outlining a gradual economic recovery amid missed growth targets. He reported that Pakistan's GDP growth, which was -0.2% in 2023, rose to 2.5% in 2024, with a target of 2.7% for 2025 and 4.2% for the following fiscal year. Aurangzeb emphasised the need for sustainable growth and avoiding another boom-and-bust cycle.

The finance minister also added that benchmark interest rates had been reduced to 11% from a peak of 22% and that the country's public debt-to-GDP ratio had fallen from 68% to 65%, supported by a government buyback of PKR 1 trillion in debt.

Aurangzeb called inflation a "fantastic story" for Pakistan: average CPI inflation had dropped from over 29% in 2023 to 4.6%, with global inflation easing from 6.8% to 4.3%. Foreign reserves rose to $9.4 billion by June 2024, up from crisis levels of just two weeks' import cover in 2023.

The remittance sector saw a 30.9% increase from July 2024 to April 2025, contributing to a rare current account surplus during this period.

== Federal budget ==
On 10 June 2022, the government unveiled a new $47 billion budget for 2022–23 to persuade the IMF to resume the $6 billion bailout deal, which was agreed upon by both sides in 2019. However, the IMF expressed dissatisfaction with the 2023–24 budget submitted by Pakistani authorities two weeks before the bailout expired, which indicated that Pakistan would not receive its bailout. On 25 June, a revised budget featuring new taxes, a rise in the Petroleum Development Levy (PDL), the lifting of all restrictions on imports, and various expenditure cuts were presented to the National Assembly and accepted the next day. These came after talks between Prime Minister Shehbaz Sharif and IMF Managing Director Kristalina Georgieva. Ishaq Dar, who presented the budget, claimed that the new budget would "make our fiscal deficit much better", adding, "I hope, God willing, that we will have an agreement with the IMF." The new federal budget included an expenditure of Rs. 14.46 trillion, supported by a net revenue of Rs. 12.163 trillion, of which Rs. 5.276 trillion was transferred to the provinces, leading to federal revenues of Rs. 6.887 trillion. The remaining expenditures were to be paid through privatisation proceeds, external receipts, and non-bank and bank borrowing (T-Bills, PIBs, Sukuk). The budget saw Rs. 7.303 trillion earmarked for debt repayment. The government in the revised budget would place the fiscal deficit at a targeted rate of 6.53% of the GDP, or Rs. 7.505 trillion, with the federal government seeking to cover it with multilateral/bilateral sources, national saving schemes, government securities, commercial/Euro bonds, the GP fund, and deposits and reserves. Within the federal budget, the raising of withholding taxes on supplies, contracts, services, and commercial imports; increasing the rate of the General Sales Tax (GST) on Tier-1 retailers from 12% to 15%; new taxes on cash withdrawals by non-filers; broadening of the Federal Excise Duty; and measures to stop the outflow of foreign currency were all included.

Five days after the federal budget was first presented to the National Assembly, the IMF would approve its $3 billion bailout for Pakistan on 30 June. Analysts said that the deal averted the threat of default hanging over the country. The following politically risky measures taken by the Sharif government include raising taxes, reversing subsidies in power and export sectors, increasing energy and fuel prices, agreeing to a market-based currency exchange rate, cutting spending, and revising the 2023–24 Federal Budget. Michael Kugelman writes, "Islamabad waited until the very final hour to take the (politically risky) fiscal policy steps that the IMF had been hoping to see for months. If it had taken those steps earlier, much of the drama and fraught negotiations of recent months likely wouldn't have had to play out." The IMF would state that the FY24 Federal Budget was "in line with the goals of supporting fiscal sustainability and mobilising revenue, which will enable greater social and development spending". However, the budget has come under significant criticism from experts, analysts, and industrial figures, calling the targets in the budget unrealistic, with a lack of any real structural reforms while committing to populist election-year policies during an economic crisis.

== Impact on industry ==
In December 2022, the All Pakistan Textile Mills Association (APTMA) stated that mills across the country were running at less than 50% capacity utilization and textile exports could fall further in 2023 but denied reports of nationwide mill shutdowns. Nishat Chunian Limited announced that it would temporarily close 51,360 out of 219,528 spindles. Several leading companies listed on the Pakistan Stock Exchange announced closures of assembly plants after they failed to secure letters of credit due to foreign exchange curbs imposed by the government, leaving them unable to import raw materials. Dollar shortages resulted in ships carrying imported pharmaceutical raw material, medicines, and healthcare devices stuck at seaports for prolonged periods. Several pharmaceutical companies shut down due to the "unaffordable cost of production", leading to the shortage of medicines and equipment across the country and forcing hospitals to postpone surgeries and treatments.

Temporary closures of Pakistani factories
Company	Closure	Re-opening
Pak Suzuki Motors	18 August 2022	26 August 2022
Pak Suzuki Motors	2/9 January 2023	6/13 January 2023
Pak Suzuki Motors	April 2023	28 April 2023
Toyota Indus	20 December 2022	30 December 2022
Honda Atlas Cars	9 March 2023	31 March 2023
Millat Tractors	5 January 2023	4 September 2024
Ghandhara Tyre & Rubber Company	10 February 2023	5 April 2023
Fauji Fertilizer Bin Qasim	21 December 2022 (intermittent)	8 February 2023

In June 2023, Shell plc announced that it would exit the Pakistani market by selling its entire 77.42% stake in Shell Pakistan. In 2024, Wafi Energy completed its acquisition of Shell and was renamed to Wafi Energy Pakistan Ltd. Foreign exchange shortages and depreciation of the Pakistani rupee created difficulties in importing crude oil, leading to a temporary closure of Pakistan's largest petroleum refinery, Cnergyico, in February 2023.

In April 2023, most of the country's 30 mobile phone assembly units, including three run by foreign brands, shut down, affecting 20,000 employees. In September 2023, following the opening up of imports and letters of credit, the vice-chairman of the Pakistan Mobile Phone Manufacturers Association (PMPMA) said nearly all domestic- and foreign-run 30 mobile assembly units had restarted operations. In 2024, 'Made in Pakistan' phones accounted for 95% of all demand, whereas the share of imported phones was just 5%. That year, local mobile manufacturers produced 31.4 million phones, a 47% increase.

== International opinion ==
Chinese officials blamed the West for Pakistan's economic crisis, and state media continues to talk about the strengths of the China–Pakistan Economic Corridor. "Only China has given a full plan. From this perspective, it is the Western world that 'abandoned' Pakistan, and China is the one that extended a helping hand. And if Pakistan wants complete self-help, it cannot completely rely on China, it still has to fight for itself", wrote Liu Qingbin, senior researcher at the China Digital Economy Institute.

The US has expressed serious concerns about Pakistan's debt to China. At the US embassy during his visit to Islamabad on 15 February 2023, US State Department Counselor Derek Chollet said, "We have been very clear about our concerns not just here in Pakistan, but elsewhere all around the world about Chinese debt, or debt owed to China".

Since the Gulf Arab states that have traditionally supported Pakistan are now unwilling to continue providing economic assistance, outside analysis indicates that Pakistan can only seek additional loan support from China. In the Middle East Institute's analysis of the 2024 election, "Even though Islamabad may rely heavily on its bilateral partnerships with Gulf countries to secure a routine rollover of bilateral debt (and is likely to see some success on this front), its vulnerable external position will sustain concerns about a potential default and make it challenging to secure multilateral financing."

== See also ==
- Economic impact of the 2022 Russian invasion of Ukraine
- 2021–2023 global energy crisis
- Sri Lankan economic crisis
- 1991 Indian economic crisis
