= Financial Monitoring Unit =

Financial Intelligence Unit (FIU) of Pakistan

- مالیاتی نگرانی اکائی

Agency overview
- Formed: 1 October 2007; 18 years ago
- Jurisdiction: Government of Pakistan
- Headquarters: Karachi, Pakistan
- Employees: Classified
- Annual budget: Classified
- Agency executive: Lubna Farooq Malik, Director General
- Parent department: Autonomous Federal Government
- Website: www.fmu.gov.pk

The Financial Monitoring Unit (FMU; Urdu: مالیاتی نگرانی اکائی) is the Financial Intelligence Unit (FIU) of Pakistan established under the provisions of Anti-Money Laundering Act, 2010 (Previously Anti-Money Laundering Ordinance, 2007). It is an independent intelligence service department of the Government of Pakistan and primarily responsible for analyzing transactions, money laundering cases, building efforts against the terrorist financing, and all sorts of financial crimes within the jurisdiction of financial laws of Pakistan.

Ms. Lubna Farooq Malik has been appointed the Director General of the FMU with effect from July 2020. It currently comprises two offices; a head office in Karachi and a Liaison office in Islamabad.

== History ==
In 2007, the Financial Monitoring Unit (FMU) was formed as a department of the State Bank of Pakistan, which is the Central Bank of Pakistan. The FMU was headed by a Director and its reporting entities were the regulated Banking Institutions coming under the ambit of the central bank.

After the approval of the Anti-Money Laundering Act, 2010, FMU was established as an autonomous government agency under the law in order to act as the Financial Intelligence Unit of Pakistan.

== Functions ==
The basic functions of FMU are to receive and analyze the Suspicious Transactions Reports (STRs) as well as Currency Transactions Reports (CTRs) from its designated reporting entities. The FMU may disseminate the Financial Intelligence to the concerned Law Enforcement Agencies (if required) for their further necessary action in this respect.

Another function of this specialized financial intelligence agency is to ensure compliance with the Pakistan's Financial Action Task Force (FATF)’s recommendations on Anti-Money laundering (AML) and terrorist financing. Moreover the unit also acts as the country's face at all international forums related to Anti-Money Laundering & Combating Terrorism financing.

In October 2019, FMU launched its first quarterly newsletter and announced that this new initiative aims to ensure that all the stakeholders including reporting entities are updated on initiatives being undertaken both at domestic and international levels towards development of AML/CFT standards.

== Directors General ==
Name	Period
Mr. Azhar Iqbal Qureshi	2007
Mr. Allah Rakha Asi	2010
Mr. Nauman Qureshi	2012
Mr. Mansoor Ahmed Khan	2014
Mr. Syed Mansoor Ali	2017 - April 2018
Mr. Mansoor Hassan Siddiqui	October 2018 - March 2020 (Deceased)
Mr. Muneer Ahmad Memon (Acting DG)	March 2020 - June 2020
Ms. Lubna Farooq Malik	July 2020 - Onwards

== Anti-Money Laundering Software (goAML) ==
The FMU has implemented an Anti-Money Laundering system for the automated detection of possible money laundering and terror financing that uses the banking system. The data centre was launched by the Governor of the State Bank of Pakistan, the British High Commissioner, and the Representative of the United Nations Office on Drugs and Crime (UNODC) at the Head Office of Financial Monitoring Unit (FMU) located in Karachi.

== See also ==
- Ministry of Finance
- Money laundering in Pakistan
- Terrorism financing
- List of financial supervisory authorities by country
