= All Pakistan Textile Mills Association =

Textile mills association in Pakistan

- Abbreviation: APTMA
- Formation: 1990
- Headquarters: Pakistan
- Region served: Pakistan, Worldwide
- Official language: English, Urdu
- Affiliations: Pakistan Chambers of Commerce & Industry
- Website: aptma.org.pk

The All Pakistan Textile Mills Association (APTMA) is an association for Textile industry in Pakistan. APTMA represents over 400 textile mills in Pakistan.

The textile industry is Pakistan's largest industry and textile is the most important export of Pakistan. Mian Muhammad Mansha, a business tycoon and one of the richest man in Pakistan, is the most famous personality in this industry.

Pakistan is the 5th largest producer of cotton in the world and the 8th largest exporter of textile products in Asia.

== History ==
APTPMA was registered with Federal Ministry of Commerce on July 5, 1990, under the Trade Organizations Ordinance 1961 and also registered under section 42 of the Companies Ordinance 1984. In July 1991, Association started operations with its headquarters at Faisalabad. APTPMA is affiliated with the Federation of Pakistan Chambers of Commerce & Industry (FPCCI).

== Committees ==
APTMA is composed of 11 committees for different purposes to assist member textile mills.

=== Admin, finance & membership care ===
==== Chairman ====
- Mr. Adil Bashir (Shams Textile Mills Ltd.)

==== Members ====
- Mr. Aamir Fayyaz (Kohinoor Mills Ltd.)
- Mr. Zahid Mazhar (Nadeem Textile Mills Ltd.)
- Mr. Hamid Zaman Khan (Sarena Textile Industries (Pvt) Ltd.)
- Mr. Abdul Rahim Nasir (Ayesha Spinning Mills Ltd.)
- Mr. Asif Inam (Diamond International Corp. Ltd.)

=== Cotton ===
==== Chairman ====
- Mr. Gohar Ejaz (Ejaz Textile Mills Ltd.)

==== Members ====
- Khawaja Muhammad Anees (Masood Spinning Mills Ltd.)
- Mr. Asif Inam (Diamond International Corp. Ltd.)
- Mr. Rehman Naseem (Ahmed Fine Textile Mills Ltd.)
- Mr. Tariq Mehmood (Pak Kuwait Textiles Ltd.)
- Mr. Shahid Abdullah (Reliance Cotton & Spinning Mills Ltd.)

=== Yarn ===
==== Chairman ====
- Mr. Naveed Ahmed (Indus Dyeing & Mfg. Co. Ltd.)

==== Members ====
- Mr. Nadeem Maqbool (Suraj Cotton Mills Ltd.)
- Mr. Anjum Zafar (Eastern Spinning Mills Ltd.)
- Mr. Rehman Naseem (Ahmed Fine Textile Mills Ltd.)
- Mr. Muhammad Zahid (Zahidjee Textile Mills Ltd.)
- Mr. Imran Maqbool (Crescent Fibres Ltd.)

=== Home textiles ===
==== Chairman ====
- Mr. Zaki Basheer (Gul Ahmed Textile Mills Ltd.)

==== Member(s) ====
- Mr. Shaiq Jawed (J.K. Spinning Mills Ltd.)

=== Processing fabric & apparel ===
==== Chairman ====
- Mr. Aamir Fayyaz (Kohinoor Mills Ltd.)

==== Members ====
- Mr. Hamid Zaman Khan (Sarena Textile Industries Pvt Ltd.)
- Mr. Abdul Rahim Nasir (Ayesha Spinning Mills Ltd.)
- Mr. Zaki Basheer (Gul Ahmed Textile Mills Ltd.)

=== Value Added (Retail Business) ===
==== Chairman ====
- Mr. Hamid Zaman (Sarena Textile Industries Pvt. Ltd.)

==== Members ====
- Mr. Muhammad Zaki Bashir (Gul Ahmed Textile Mills Ltd.)
- Mr. Asad Shafi (Ayesha Spinning Mills Ltd.)
- Mr. Nabeel Tanveer (Din Textile Mills Ltd.)

== See also ==
- Economy of Pakistan
- Foreign trade of Pakistan
- Textile manufacturing
- Textile Institute of Pakistan
