= Foreign trade of Pakistan =

Imports and exports in Pakistan

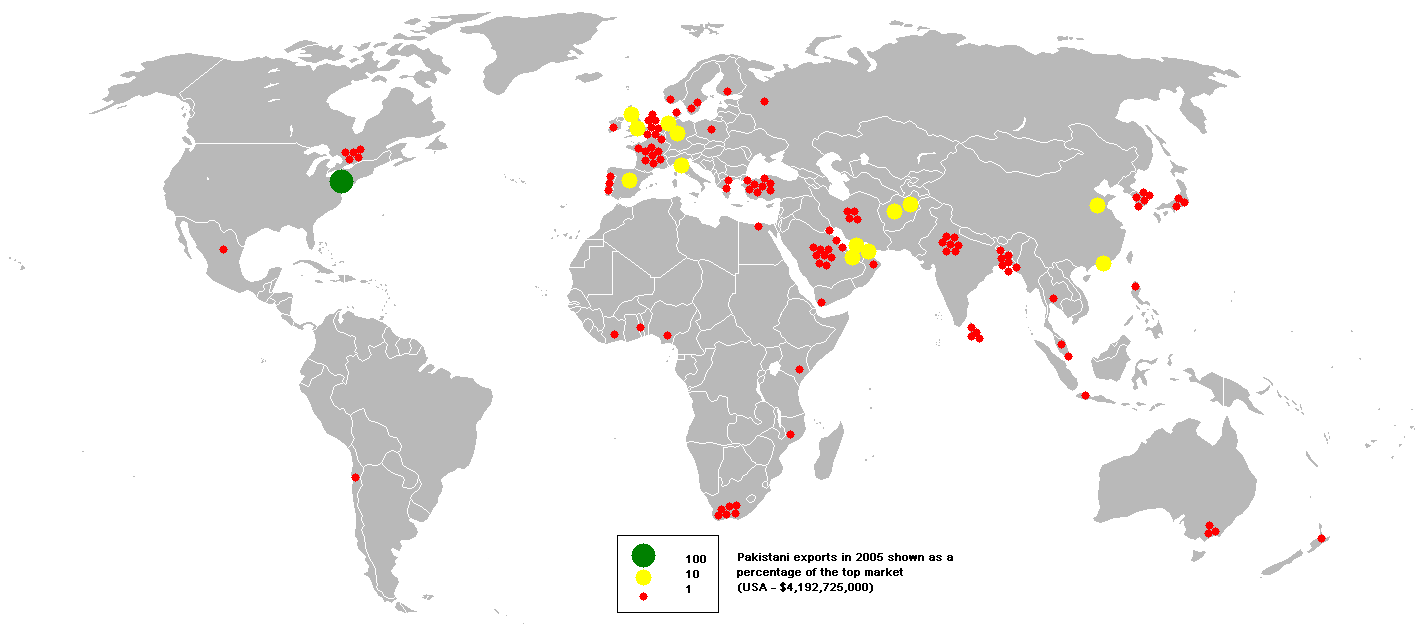
Pakistani exports in 2005

Pakistan has bilateral and multilateral trade agreements with many nations and international organizations. It is a member of the World Trade Organization, part of the South Asian Free Trade Area agreement and the China–Pakistan Free Trade Agreement. Fluctuating world demand for its exports, domestic political uncertainty, and the impact of occasional droughts on its agricultural production have all contributed to variability in Pakistan's trade deficit. The trade deficit for the fiscal year 2013/14 is $7.743 billion, exports are $10.367 billion in July–November 2013 and imports are $18.110 billion.

Pakistan's exports continue to be dominated by manpower export in the subcontinent, cotton textiles and apparel. Imports include petroleum and petroleum products, chemicals, fertilizer, capital goods, industrial raw materials, and consumer products.

On 12 December 2013, the European Union granted GSP Plus status to Pakistan until 2017, which enabled it to export 20% of its good with 0 tariff and 70 percent at preferential rates to the EU market. This status was given after the European Parliament passed the resolution by 406-186 votes. Foreign trade is important for the economy because the country has to import different types of products but due to a heavy reliance on imports, Pakistan has been facing a trade balance deficit.

== Exports ==
Exports of Pakistan by product category (2019) Chemical products Transportation Machines Mineral products Plastics and rubbers Metals Foodstuffs Precious metals Textiles Instruments Animal products Vegetable products Paper goods Footwear and headwear Miscellaneous Stone and glass Wood products Animal and vegetable bi-products Animal hides Arts and antiques Weapons

Pakistan's exports for the year 2015-2016 stood at US$21 Billion and imports were at US$44.76 billion for the same period.

Pakistan's exports increased more than 100% from $7.5 billion in 1999 to stand at $18 billion in the financial year 2007–2008.

Pakistan exports rice, kinnows, mangoes, furniture, cotton fiber, cement, tiles, marble, textiles, clothing, leather goods, veterinary surgical supplies, sports goods (renowned for footballs/soccer balls), cutlery, surgical instruments, electrical appliances, software, carpets, rugs, ice cream, livestock meat, chicken, powdered milk, wheat, seafood (especially shrimp/prawns), vegetables, processed food items, Pakistani-assembled Suzukis (to Afghanistan and other countries), defense equipment (submarines, tanks, radars), salt, onyx, engineering goods, and many other items. Pakistan produces and exports cements to Asia and the Middle East. In August 2007, Pakistan started exporting cement to India to fill in the shortage there caused by the building boom. Russia is a growing market for Pakistani exporters. In 2009/2010 the export target of Pakistan was US$20 billion. As of April 2015, Pakistan's exports stand at US$29 billion

== Pakistan’s Major Trading Partners (2024–2025) ==
(Approximate Merchandise Trade Data)

Country / Region	Imports from Partner	Exports to Partner	Trade Balance	% of Pakistan’s Total Trade
People's Republic of China	US$17.0 bn (28.3%)	US$2.4 bn (7.3%)	–US$14.6 bn	20.7%
European Union	US$6.2 bn (10.4%)	US$11.6 bn (35.7%)	+US$5.4 bn	19.6%
United Arab Emirates	US$6.0 bn (10.0%)	US$1.8 bn (5.4%)	–US$4.2 bn	8.3%
Saudi Arabia	US$4.7 bn (7.9%)	US$0.8 bn (2.3%)	–US$3.9 bn	5.9%
United States	US$1.7 bn (2.8%)	US$5.6 bn (17.3%)	+US$3.9 bn	8.1%
Qatar	US$4.0 bn (6.6%)	US$0.1 bn (0.4%)	–US$3.9 bn	4.4%
Indonesia	US$3.5 bn (5.9%)	US$0.5 bn (1.6%)	–US$3.0 bn	4.3%
Kuwait	US$2.0 bn (3.3%)	US$0.02 bn (0.07%)	–US$1.98 bn	2.1%
Japan	US$1.3 bn (2.1%)	US$0.5 bn (1.6%)	–US$0.8 bn	1.9%
Iran	US$1.3 bn (2.1%)	US$0.2 bn (0.6%)	–US$1.1 bn	1.6%
Afghanistan	US$0.7 bn (1.2%)	US$1.5 bn (4.7%)	+US$0.8 bn	2.4%
Singapore	US$1.3 bn (2.1%)	US$0.3 bn (0.9%)	–US$1.0 bn	1.7%
Turkiye	US$0.45 bn (0.7%)	US$0.35 bn (1.1%)	–US$0.10 bn	0.9%
Russia	US$1.1 bn (1.8%)	US$0.12 bn (0.4%)	–US$0.98 bn	1.2%
Ukraine	US$0.32 bn (0.5%)	US$0.09 bn (0.3%)	–US$0.23 bn	0.4%
South Korea	US$1.4 bn (2.3%)	US$0.32 bn (1.0%)	–US$1.08 bn	1.8%
Thailand	US$1.1 bn (1.8%)	US$0.18 bn (0.6%)	–US$0.92 bn	1.3%
Malaysia	US$3.2 bn (5.3%)	US$0.35 bn (1.1%)	–US$2.85 bn	3.9%
Uzbekistan	US$0.06 bn (0.1%)	US$0.11 bn (0.3%)	+US$0.05 bn	0.2%
Tajikistan	US$0.03 bn (0.05%)	US$0.08 bn (0.2%)	+US$0.05 bn	0.1%
Pakistan's total trade	~US$60 billion	~US$32.5 billion	–US$27.5 billion	100%

== See also ==
- Economy of Pakistan
