= Chobi rug =

Hand-made rugs developed in Turkey

Chobi rugs CHOBI is a widely used commercial term used for hand made carpets from Afghanistan and to a diminished extent in the NWFP region of Afghanistan/Pakistan border. This term has been used since the displacement and return of refugees during and after the Soviet Afghan war in the 1980s. The uprooting of weaving populations effected traditional all wool weaving which had previously been almost exclusively based on Turkmen designs with an all wool structure in red tones as expressed by Afghan carpets. ( NB Not to be confused with the imitative Pakistan poly-chrome products such as ' Princess Bokhara ' ) Strong demand for furnishing concepts from the west to produce Persian style patterns most notably the concept of Ziegler carpets proved a good commercial success and a well made robust product using increasingly cotton as a foundation resulted. Following a western lead in tase since late 1980s the business has since 2000 fallen to a considerable degree to being administered via Pakistan merchants given the ease of export from Pakistan. Afghan weavers had largely returned to Afghanistan from Pakistan refugee camps during late 20th cent however since the Taliban/ Pashtuns take over of Afghanistan in 2021 disruption to weaving has again occurred.

== Etymology ==
The word Chobi with its various spellings and transliterations ("choobi", "choubi", "chubi") is an attribution from the word “choob” with a long vowel of ”oo” as it sounds in book. “Choob” literally means wood and originally is a Persian word that is used for the same meaning in Urdu as well as some parts of India.

== Origin ==
Chobi rugs were a response to the North American fashion taste that intended to modify the boldness of the traditional rugs in order to give a muted and antique look of natural wood color that was desired by modern fashion industry. Chobi was developed in Lahore and weaving centres were set up in border region of Pakistan and Afghanistan where they were mostly produced for the North American market. The name CHOBI was given to rugs made with Natural Dyed rugs Several years ago, a company named Rugman invested a significant amount of money to create workshops in the region to weave Chobi rugs. To meet the demand, Western carpet importers and department stores worked with Eastern producers to create new, modified oriental styles. One of the most famous designs of that time—the Ziegler—has clear echoes in today's Chobi.
