= Pakistan Customs =

Pakistan Customs گمرکی پاکستان
- Abbreviation: PCS

Jurisdictional structure
- Operations jurisdiction: Islamic Republic of Pakistan

Operational structure
- Headquarters: Islamabad, Pakistan
- Agency executive: Syed Shakeel Shah, FBR Member Customs Operations
- Parent agency: Federal Board of Revenue

Website
- fbr.gov.pk

Pakistan Customs (گمرکی پاکستان) is one of the cadres of the Civil Services of Pakistan. It is staffed by officers from the Pakistan Customs Service (PCS) which is one of the premier occupational groups among Pakistan's civil services.

Pakistan’s Federal taxation was originally organised along the lines of Indirect & Direct taxes, resulting in two occupational groups viz. Customs & Excise Group, and Income Tax Group. However, in 2010 the groups were reorganised along the lines of Domestic Duty & Taxes and International Duties & Taxes, which resulted in formation of Pakistan Customs Service & the Inland Revenue Service. The responsibilities of collecting sales tax and Federal excise on Domestic Transactions were transferred to the newly created Inland Revenue Service (IRS).

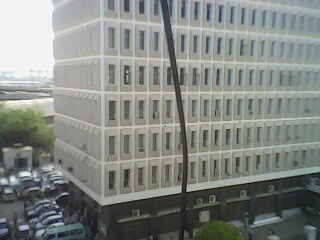
Custom House, Karachi

It has realigned the role of Customs according to best international practice of facilitating legitimate trade & passengers, guarding against illicit trade, and making the country part of global value chains.

== Powers ==
The anti-smuggling powers delegated previously by Pakistan Customs to Pakistan Rangers, Frontier Constabulary, Levies, and Police were withdrawn in view of expansion of Pakistan Customs role in border regions. The shift in the role of Pakistan Customs to a Border Control Agency with substantial responsibility in safeguarding country's trade policies, intellectual property rights, transit trade, money laundering, and smuggling.

Apart from land and air jurisdiction, Pakistan Customs has two hundred nautical miles (370 km; 230 mi) sea jurisdiction also, called as Pakistan Customs Waters, where it carries out anti-smuggling operations independently and sometimes jointly with Pakistan Coast Guards and Pakistan Maritime Security Agency.

== History ==
The origin of an organized Customs Department in the sub-continent can be traced to 1878 when maritime Customs operations were sought to be institutionalized by Her Majesty's Crown under the Sea Customs Act.

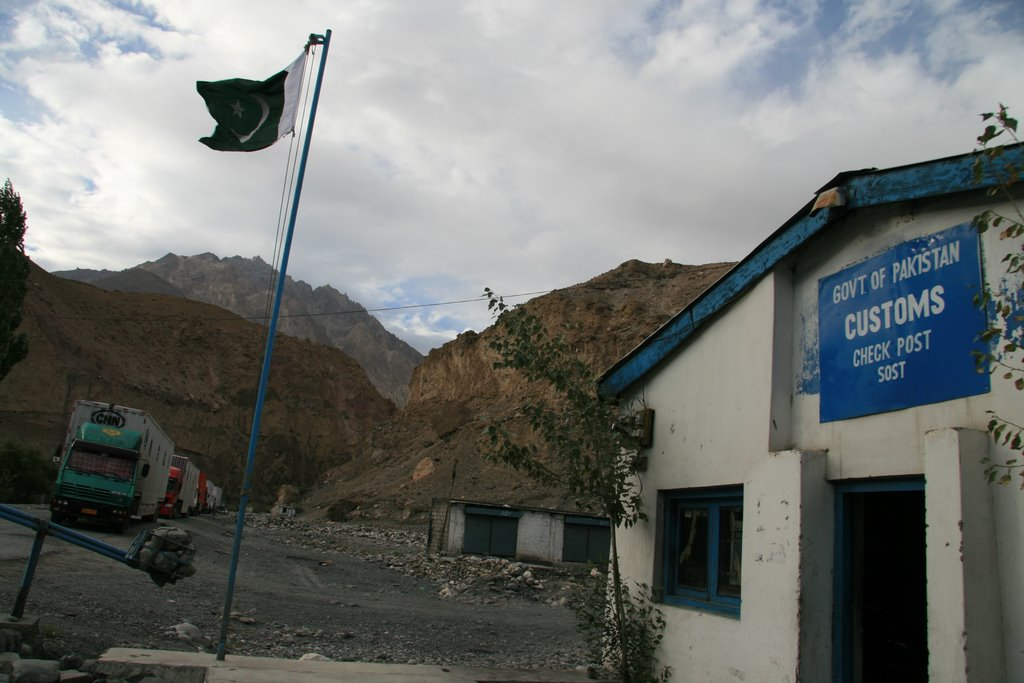
Pakistan Customs checkpost at Sust village, Gojal

In 1901, Karachi was declared as the chief port of Sindh. In the following year, a plan was instituted to build permanent offices for the port and Customs officials at Karachi. The task was entrusted to G. Willet, the consulting architect to the Government of Bombay, who designed the new building as a semi-circular structure in the Victorian tradition. The construction of the building commenced in 1912 and culminated in 1914. The first meeting of Karachi Port Trust and Customs was held in that building on 12 January 1916.

The Custom House Karachi is the headquarters of Preventive Collectorate, Appraisement Collectorate, and Exports Collectorate, in addition to Model Customs Collectorate at present. In the southern region also, the Collectorate of Customs, Central Excise and Sales Tax, Hyderabad was established in 1967 subsequent to the bifurcation of the Collectorate of Central Excise, Karachi. The jurisdiction of Hyderabad Customs Collectorate comprises the whole of Sindh, excluding Karachi, Multan, and Bahawalpur.

In the northern part of the country, Customs and Central Excise operations were carried out simultaneously through the Collectorate of Central Excise and Land Customs Lahore. It was the second oldest Collectorate in the country whose jurisdiction spanned the whole of the former West Pakistan, barring Karachi and Balochistan. Custom House Lahore was the regional Customs and Central Excise headquarters.

=== Projects ===
Pakistan customs has many flagship projects:

- AEO pilot project
- Women and Youth Led Cross-border Commerce through Innovation
- Customs Public School
- Pakistan Customs Cricket Team

== See also ==
- Smuggling in Pakistan
- Customs Public School
- Pakistan Customs cricket team
