= Smuggling in Pakistan =

Smuggling in Pakistan is a significant problem, and it has an impact on the country's economy. The illicit trade of various goods across Pakistan's borders with Iran and Afghanistan remains a persistent issue. Smuggled products have infiltrated multiple sectors of Pakistan's economy, spanning items such as cell phones, fuel, and everyday necessities like toiletries and tea. This illicit activity poses challenges to the formal economy and governmental efforts to regulate trade.

== Border Smuggling ==
Border smuggling poses a substantial challenge in Pakistan, with the illicit trade of goods continuing along Pakistan's borders with Iran and Afghanistan.

=== Smuggling Routes and Methods ===
Smugglers employ a range of routes and tactics to engage in the illegal trade of goods in and out of Pakistan. These methods encompass land routes through the rugged mountainous areas adjoining Iran and Afghanistan, as well as sea routes along the Arabian Sea. Smugglers frequently utilize animals like camels and horses, and in some instances, even human couriers to transport illicit goods across the borders, illustrating the versatility and resourcefulness of these illicit activities.

=== Smuggled Goods ===
A diverse array of goods is trafficked across the border, encompassing items such as cellphones, fuel, and everyday essentials like toiletries and tea. Additionally, certain critical commodities like sugar and urea are illicitly transported out of Pakistan, while products including petroleum, oil, and lubricants (POL) are smuggled into Pakistan through less-traveled routes that traverse the border regions of Afghanistan and Iran. These smuggling activities have significant economic and regulatory implications for Pakistan.

== Anti-Smuggling Measures ==
Pakistan Customs has ramped up its efforts to combat smuggling, resulting in the confiscation of approximately Rs2.25 billion worth of essential commodities in the past two weeks. This crackdown specifically targets essential goods such as sugar and urea being smuggled out of Pakistan, as well as products like petroleum, oil, and lubricants (POL) being smuggled into Pakistan. These illegal activities typically occur through less-traveled routes located in border regions adjacent to Afghanistan and Iran. These efforts aim to curb the illicit trade of crucial commodities that adversely impact Pakistan's economy.

== Government Initiatives ==
The Government of Canada, in collaboration with the United Nations Office on Drugs and Crime (UNODC), has initiated a project in Islamabad aimed at addressing human trafficking and migrant smuggling in Pakistan. This project's primary objective is to enhance the Federal Investigation Agency's capacity to combat Trafficking in Persons (TIP) and Smuggling of Migrants (SOM). The partnership seeks to bolster law enforcement efforts and resources to combat these illicit activities within the country.

== Impact on Economy ==
Smuggled goods play a substantial role in meeting a significant portion of the demand within Pakistani markets. The top twelve commodities that are illegally brought into the country contribute as much as $3.3 billion annually. What's even more concerning is that law enforcement and regulatory agencies in Pakistan can only seize a small fraction, around 5%, of the smuggled goods entering the country. This underscores the challenges authorities face in curbing the rampant smuggling activity in the region.

== Recent Incidents ==
In 2023 in response to the recent incidents, the caretaker Prime Minister, Anwar-ul-Haq Kakar, has instructed Customs authorities to strengthen surveillance at irregular border crossings and implement a monitoring system to combat smuggling effectively. The Federal Investigation Agency (FIA) has taken action by apprehending over 127 suspects and seizing a substantial amount of Rs679 million in efforts to combat illegal currency and dollar smuggling operations. Additionally, the Punjab Police made significant busts in two separate operations, confiscating a total of 27 kilograms of heroin. This came after an initial smuggling incident where three individuals from Pakistan used swimming as a means to transport a 50-kilogram heroin consignment into India. These law enforcement actions highlight ongoing efforts to tackle smuggling and illegal activities in the region.

=== 2023 National-wide Massive Crackdown ===
In 2023, Pakistan initiated a comprehensive nationwide effort to combat smuggling. Pakistan Customs significantly intensified its anti-smuggling operations, resulting in the seizure of approximately Rs2.25 billion worth of vital commodities during the past two weeks. These essential goods, such as sugar and urea, were being smuggled out of Pakistan, while items like petroleum, oil, and lubricants (POL) were illegally brought into Pakistan using less-traveled routes along the border regions with Afghanistan and Iran. This crackdown is part of Pakistan's broader strategy to address the persistent issue of smuggling and its economic repercussions.

A sweeping crackdown against smugglers is ongoing nationwide, involving a collaborative effort between various agencies. In a joint operation conducted by FC Balochistan, the Anti-Narcotics Force, Levies, Law Enforcement Agencies, and others, there has been a significant accomplishment in combatting narcotics in the Qila Abdullah district of Balochistan. The operation has successfully achieved a total of forty-two objectives, which include the destruction of drug production facilities, drug storage sites, and valuable machinery. Additionally, eleven individuals have been apprehended as part of this extensive crackdown. This operation underscores the government's commitment to addressing the issue of drug smuggling in the region.

The Pakistani Rupee (PKR) has experienced a notable resurgence in both the interbank and open markets, attributed to the concerted efforts of Pakistani authorities in clamping down on currency smuggling and the black market. On September 7, 2023, the domestic currency showcased impressive gains, indicating a positive trend for the PKR.
