= Third Nawaz Sharif government =

Government of Pakistan (2013–2017)

Federal Cabinet of Nawaz Sharif
- 45th Cabinet of Pakistan
- 2013-2017
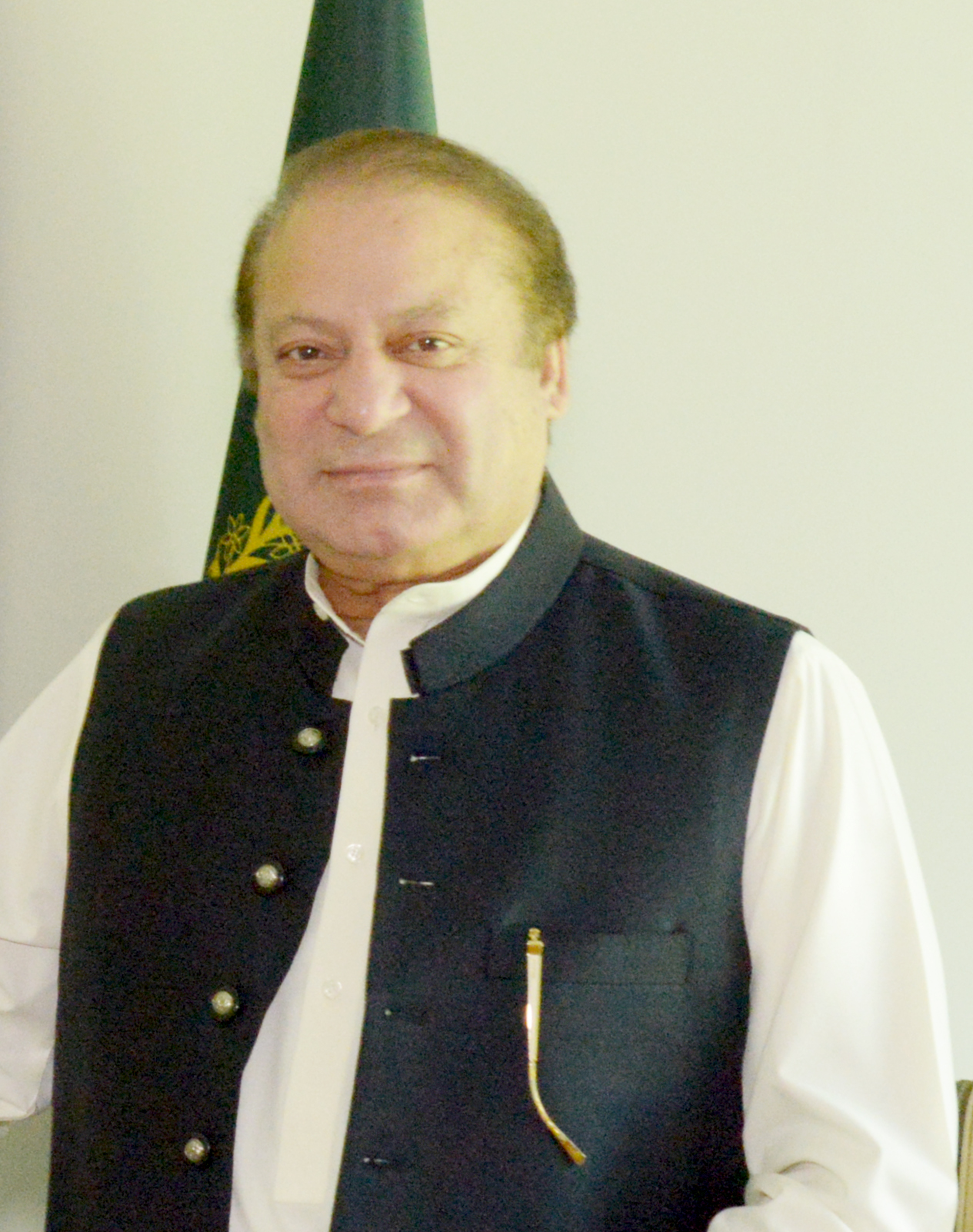
- Date formed: 7 June 2013
- Date dissolved: 28 July 2017

People and organisations
- Head of state: Asif Ali Zardari (2013); Mamnoon Hussain
- Head of government: Nawaz Sharif
- Member party: PMLN
- Status in legislature: Senators; Minority; National Assembly; Majority
- Opposition party: PPP; PTI
- Opposition leader: Khurshid Shah

History
- Incoming formation: Government formation
- Election: 2013
- Predecessor: Khoso caretaker government
- Successor: Abbasi Ministry

The third Nawaz Sharif government was formed at noon PKT on 5 June 2013 when Pakistan Muslim League (N) (PML-N) chief Nawaz Sharif became the prime minister of Pakistan for the third time. Sharif successfully led the right-of-centre and conservative PML-N to acquire a simple majority. in the 2013 general election against the leftist Pakistan Peoples Party (PPP) and the centrist Pakistan Tehreek-e-Insaf (PTI).

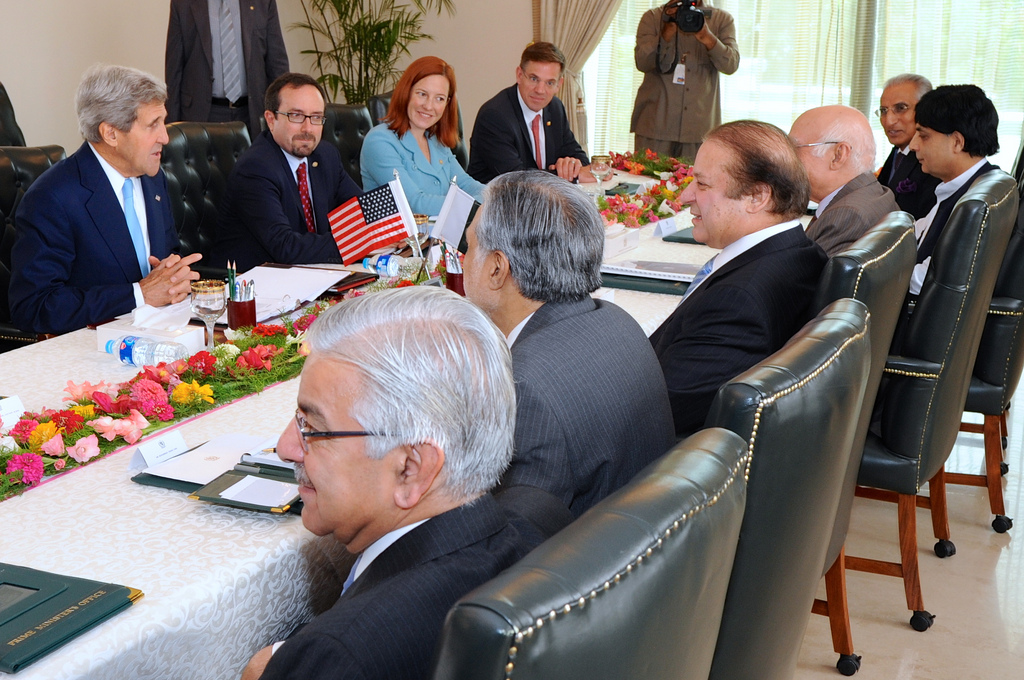
Nawaz Sharif and his high level cabinet members meet with John Kerry and several U.S advisors

The cabinet was automatically dissolved on 28 July 2017 after Nawaz Sharif was disqualified and removed from the office of Prime Minister when the Supreme Court declared him guilty of not being truthful and honest.

In terms of economy, the government moved towards keynesianism.

== Government formation ==
Following the 2013 general election, the Pakistan Muslim League (N) (PML-N) won a plurality of seats in the National Assembly through a simple majority, after failing to secure an overall two-thirds majority. In order to form a government, the PML-N joined in coalition with the Pakistan Muslim League (F) (PML-F) and the National Peoples Party (NPP).

== Cabinet ==
Ministry	Federal Minister	Term
Minister of Finance	Ishaq Dar	
Minister of Defence	Khawaja Muhammad Asif	
Minister of Water and Power	Khawaja Muhammad Asif	
Minister of Information, Broadcasting and National Heritage	Pervaiz Rashid	2013–2016
Minister of Industries and Production	Ghulam Murtaza Khan Jatoi	
Minister of Interior and Narcotics Control	Nisar Ali Khan	
Minister of National Food Security and Research	Sikandar Bosan	
Minister of Petroleum and Natural Resources	Shahid Khaqan Abbasi	
Minister of Planning, Development and Reform	Ahsan Iqbal	
Minister of Human Rights	Kamran Michael	
Minister of Railways	Khawaja Saad Rafique	
Minister of Religious Affairs and Interfaith Harmony	Sardar Muhammad Yousuf	
Minister of States and Frontier Regions	Abdul Qadir Baloch	
Minister of Commerce	Khurram Dastgir Khan	
Minister of Defence Production	Rana Tanveer Hussain	
Ministry of Overseas Pakistanis and Human Resource Development	Pir Sadaruddin Shah	
Ministry of Housing and Works	Akram Khan Durrani	
Minister of Kashmir Affairs and Gilgit Baltistan	Barjees Tahir	
Minister of Law and Justice	Zahid Hamid; Pervaiz Rashid; Zahid Hamid	2013; 2013–2016; 2016–2017
Minister of Parliamentary Affairs	Sheikh Aftab Ahmed	2016–2017
Minister of Ports and Shipping	Kamran Michael; Hasil Bizenjo	2013–2016; 2016 – 2017
Minister of Inter Provincial Coordination	Riaz Hussain Pirzada	
Minister of Science and Technology	Zahid Hamid; Rana Tanveer Hussain	2013–2014; 2014 – 2017
Minister of States	Cabinet-level Ministers	
No Portfolio	Usman Ibrahim	2015–2017
Minister of State for Federal Education and Professional Training and Minister of State for Interior and Narcotics Control	Muhammad Baligh Ur Rehman	
Minister of State for Capital Administration and Development Division	Usman Ibrahim; Tariq Fazal Chaudhry	2014–2015; 2015–2017
Minister of State for Information Technology and Telecommunication	Anusha Rahman	
Minister of State for Information and Broadcasting	Maryam Aurangzeb	2016–2017
Minister of State for National Health Services Regulation and Coordination	Saira Afzal Tarar	
Minister of State for Petroleum and Natural Resources	Jam Kamal Khan	
Minister of State for Religious Affairs and Inter-faith Harmony	Shaykh Muhammad Amin al-Hasanat Shah	
Minister of State for Water and Power	Abid Sher Ali	
Minister of State for Science and Technology	Khurram Dastgir Khan	2013–2014
Minister of State for Parliamentary Affairs	Sheikh Aftab Ahmed	2013–2016
Minister of Climate Change	Zahid Hamid	2015–2017
Minister of State for Housing and Works	Usman Ibrahim	2013–2014
Minister of State for Railways	Abdul Hakeem Baloch	2013–2014
Cabinet-level appointments	Appointees/Advisers	
Advisor to Prime Minister on Foreign Affairs	Sartaj Aziz	2013-2017
Advisor to the Prime Minister on National Security	Sartaj Aziz	2013-2015
Advisor to the Prime Minister on National Security	Nasser Janjua	2015-2017
Advisor to the Prime Minister on Aviation	Shujaat Azeem	
Special Assistant to the Prime Minister (Ministry)	Sanaullah Zehri	
Special Assistant to Prime Minister on Foreign Affairs (Minister of State)	Tariq Fatemi	
Special Assistant to the Prime Minister on Investment	Miftah Ismail	
Special Assistant to the Prime Minister on Law and Justice	Ashtar Ausaf Ali	

=== Changes ===
- 27 November 2013 – Khawaja Muhammad Asif and Pervez Rasheed are given additional charges of the Ministry of Defence and the Ministry of Law, Justice and Human Rights respectively.
- 16 January 2014 – Khurram Dastgir Khan is elevated from the Ministry of State and sworn in as designate federal minister. Khan is later assigned as the federal minister for the Ministry of Commerce. With the induction of Jamiat Ulema-e-Islam (F) into the coalition government, JUI-F ministers Maulana Abdul Ghafoor Haideri and Akram Khan Durrani are made designate federal minister and designate minister of state respectively, while independent FATA legislator Abbas Afridi is also sworn in as designate federal minister.
- 23 October 2013 - Nasser Janjua replaced Sartaj Aziz as the National Security Advisor.

== Major initiatives and actions ==
Foreign Policy Actions

  - Responding to the 2014 Jinnah International Airport attack
    - Launching the Operation Zarb-e-Azb and Operation Khyber-1
      - Enforcement and initiation of the National Action Plan against the terrorism
      - Initiated policies to provide commitment to work with President Ashraf Ghani on stabilizing Afghanistan
    - Renewed commitment towards completing the Iran–Pakistan gas pipeline as part of the Energy security legislation.
    - Establishing the National Intelligence Directorate
    - Initiated the China–Pakistan Economic Corridor
- Economic Policy Actions
  - Launched the privatization process in Pakistan
  - Launched the Pakistan Vision 2025
  - Legislation to improve taxation system
  - Responding to the Late 2000s recession
- Domestic Policy Actions
  - Education
    - Release funds for Higher Education Commission to focus on higher education research.
  - Social Policy
    - Prime Minister’s Youth Programme
    - Increasing the scope of the Benazir Income Support Programme
  - Other
    - Extended the Operation Madad in responding to 2014 Pakistan floods
- National Security Actions
  - Reconstitute the National Security Council to maintain balance in civil military relations
    - Appointment of Sartaj Aziz as the National Security Advisor (NSA)
    - Continuation of the Nuclear power programme–2050 as part of the Energy security legislation.
    - Establishing military courts commission (Pakistan)|military courts commissions for terror suspects
    - Protection of Pakistan Ordinance No. 2014
    - Establishing the National Counter Terrorism Authority
- Constitutional Actions
  - XXI Amendment to the Constitution of Pakistan
