= Imran Khan government =

Government of Pakistan (2018–2022)

Federal Cabinet of Imran Khan
- 48th Cabinet of Pakistan
- 2018–2022
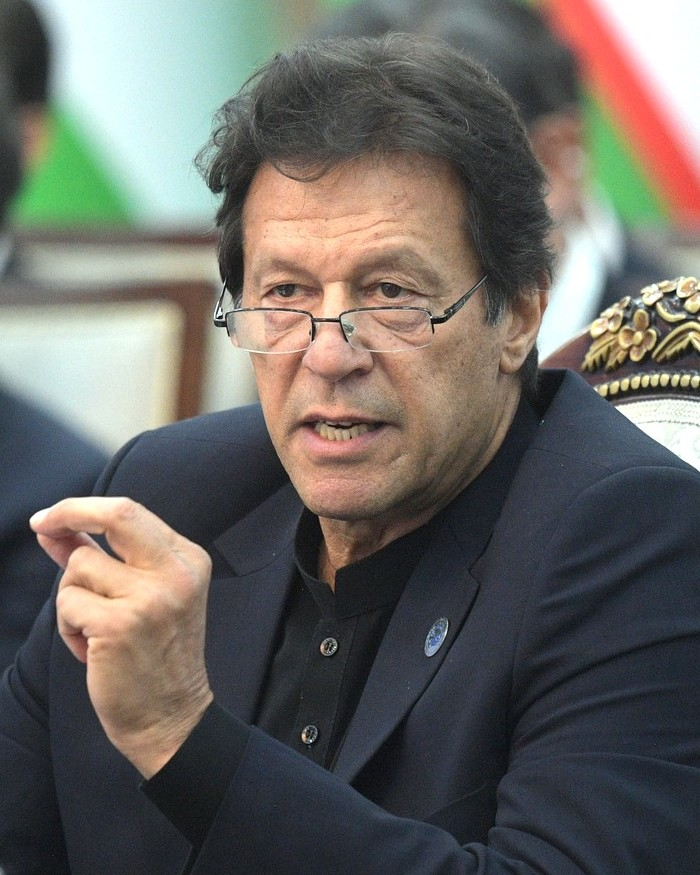
- Date formed: 20 August 2018
- Date dissolved: 10 April 2022

People and organisations
- Head of state: Mamnoon Hussain (until 9 September 2018); Arif Alvi (from September 2018)
- Head of government: Imran Khan
- Member party: PTI; Coalition partners: MQM-P(Former); BAP(Former); GDA; AML(Former); PML (Q); Independent; JWP
- Status in legislature: Senators; Coalition government National Assembly; Majority coalition
- Opposition party: Pakistan Muslim League (N)
- Opposition leader: Shehbaz Sharif

History
- Election: 2018
- Legislature terms: 15th Parliament of Pakistan
- Predecessor: Mulk caretaker ministry
- Successor: First Shehbaz Sharif ministry

The Imran Khan government was the federal cabinet of Pakistan from 20 August 2018 to 10 April 2022. It was formed by Imran Khan, following general elections on 25 July 2018, which saw the Pakistan Tehreek-e-Insaaf (PTI) come to power. The cabinet had 34 federal ministers, 7 ministers of state, 10 Advisers to the Prime Minister and 35 Special Assistants to the Prime Minister (SAPM), most of whom assumed office on 20 August 2018. On 10 April 2022 the government was defeated in a vote of no-confidence against Imran Khan, leading to its subsequent dissolution.

Various ministers and advisors of the cabinet had previously served in the military government of Pervez Musharraf, Out of a total of 21 ministers in 2018; 12 ministers had previously served under Musharraf, while 5 ministers served previously under PPP governments. The PTI ministry saw 4 different finance ministers (Asad Umar, Abdul Hafeez Shaikh, Hammad Azhar, Shaukat Tarin) from 2018 to 2022. By April 2021 the government had reshuffled six times. During its tenure, due to the COVID-19 pandemic, economic pressures, and corruption scandals involving Khan's aides and party, the army increased its influence in civilian governance, with military officials being appointed to various posts. Near the end of the government's tenure, Pakistan experienced surging inflation and the start of a severe years-long economic crisis in late 2021.

The Imran Khan government was described as a civil-military "hybrid regime", while Imran Khan frequently described himself and the military establishment as being on the "same page." However, later tensions developed between the Prime Minister and the Chief of Army Staff (COAS), Gen Qamar Javed Bajwa, eventually leading to a rift.

Policy initiatives of the government include the Ehsaas Programme, Kamyab Jawan Program, Plant for Pakistan, Raast, military extensions (Army, Navy, Airforce), Roshan Digital Account and the Sehat Sahulat Program.

== Cabinet ==
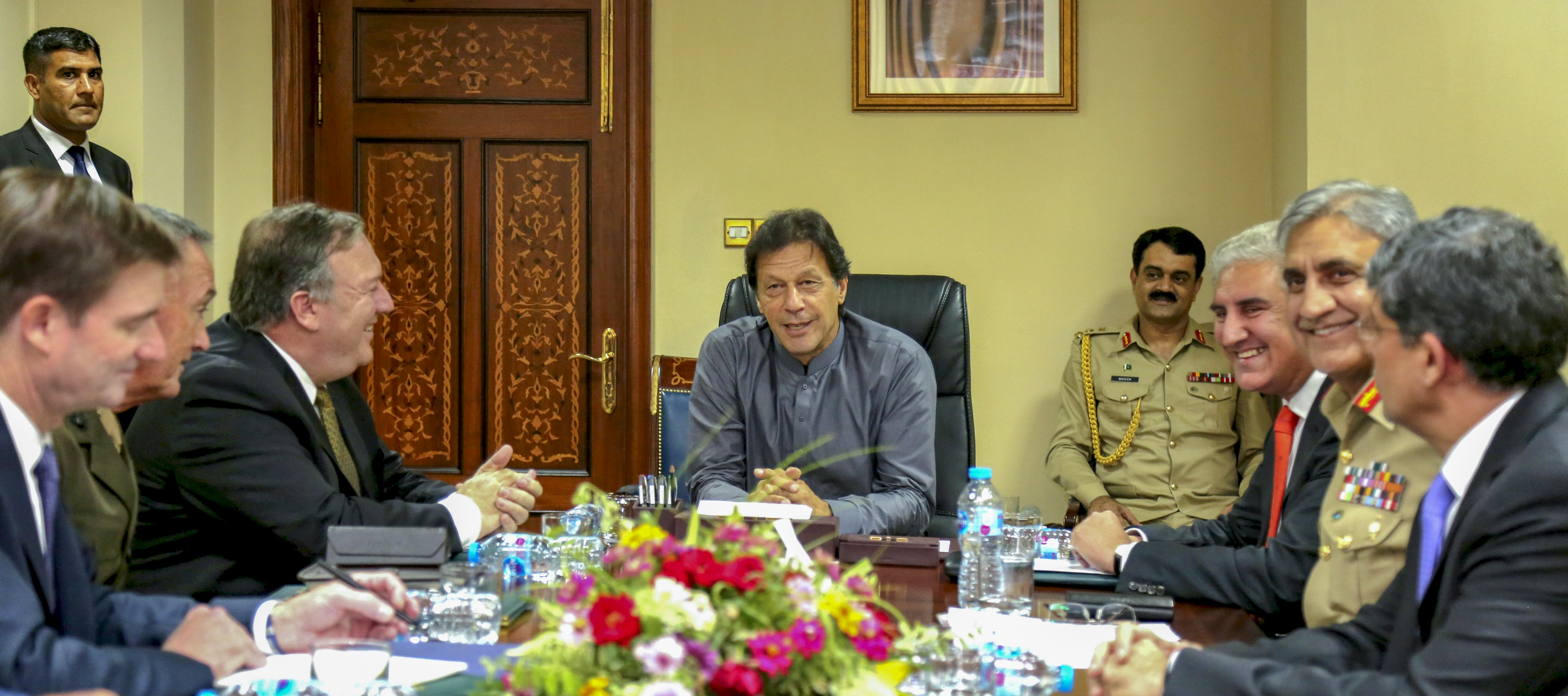
Imran Khan's cabinet with Mike Pompeo.

Khan announced his cabinet soon after taking the oath, he kept the ministry of interior to himself. His choice for ministries was criticized as he came into power on the slogan of Change and Naya Pakistan but most of his appointees were previously ministers during the era of Pervez Musharraf and some served in PPP government which followed Musharraf era.

He was criticized by supporters and critics for settling for "Diet Reform" as Musharraf pursued rather than the real change that was embodied by the PTI.

To counter that, Imran Khan held meeting with the federal cabinet twice a week and monitor the ministers’ performances regularly.

As a result, Khusro Bakhtiar was shuffled 5 times although he had served as a minister during Musharraf's regime and PML-N coalition government

Shafqat Mehmood was assigned two portfolios and he was commended for his performance during COVID. He had also served as a minister during 1990s and Musharraf regime.

Farogh Naseem has been part of Musharraf's legal team representing him against treason charges which aroused speculation on PTI's stance on if Pervez Musharraf will be tried for treason. Tariq Bashir Cheema has been minister in a past PPP government.

Fehmida Mirza has been Speaker of the National Assembly of Pakistan in a PPP government.

Sheikh Rasheed Ahmad was assigned the railways and interior ministry on the basis of his experience as a minister during the Musharraf and PML-N era.

Ghulam Sarwar Khan also served as a minister during Musharraf regime. Zubaida Jalal Khan was a minister and held the same portfolio during Musharraf era.

Fawad Chaudhry was media coordinator in the political party formed by Musharraf as well a special Assistant to Prime Minister Yousuf Raza Gilani.

Shah Mehmood Qureshi held the same portfolio in a PPP government. Babar Awan also served in a past PPP government.

Malik Amin Aslam held same portfolio under Musharraf government but is more of a technocrat than a politician. Abdul Razak Dawood was commerce minister for Musharraf as well.

Omar Ayub Khan was the minister of state for finance in Shaukat Aziz's cabinet during the Pervez Musharraf regime. Ali Muhammad Mahar was the former Chief Minister of Sindh during the Musharraf regime.

=== Reshuffles ===
Imran Khan reshuffled his cabinet for six times during his ministry. One of the cabinet reshuffles was on the directions of the Islamabad High Court that barred un-elected advisers and special assistants from heading the Cabinet committees.

On 18 April 2019, the cabinet saw a reshuffle after Asad Umar stepped down as the finance minister.

On 6 April 2020, the cabinet saw another reshuffle. In late April 2020, PTI Senator Shibli Faraz was appointed as the information minister. Meanwhile, retired Lt Gen Asim Saleem Bajwa was appointed as special assistant to the prime minister for information replacing Firdous Ashiq Awan.

In December 2020, the federal cabinet saw the fourth reshuffle days after the Islamabad High Court ruled that unelected advisers and special assistants could not head government's committees.

In April 2021, Shaukat Tarin was appointed as finance minister, the fourth person to hold the post in the last two years, as Prime Minister Imran Khan made his sixth cabinet reshuffle since assuming power.

=== Federal Ministers ===
Federal ministers
| # | Name | Portfolio | Assumed office | Left office | Party |
|---|---|---|---|---|---|
| 1 | Imran Khan | Prime Minister All important policy issues and all other portfolios not allocated to any minister. | 18 August 2018 | 10 April 2022 | PTI |
| 2 | Shah Mahmood Qureshi | Foreign Affairs | 20 August 2018 | 10 April 2022 | PTI |
| 3 | Pervez Khattak | Defence | 20 August 2018 | 10 April 2022 | PTI |
| 4 | Fawad Chaudhry | Information & Broadcasting | 20 August 2018 | 18 April 2019 | PTI |
| 4 | Fawad Chaudhry | Science and Technology | 18 April 2019 | 17 April 2021 | PTI |
| 4 | Fawad Chaudhry | Information and Broadcasting | 17 April 2021 | 10 April 2022 | PTI |
| 4 | Fawad Chaudhry | Law and Justice | 1 April 2022 | 10 April 2022 | PTI |
| 5 | Asad Umar | Finance, Revenue and Economic Affairs | 20 August 2018 | 18 April 2019 | PTI |
| 5 | Asad Umar | Planning, Development, Reforms and Special Initiatives | 19 November 2019 | 10 April 2022 | PTI |
| 6 | Shaukat Tarin | Finance and Revenue | 17 April 2021 | 16 October 2021 | PTI |
| 6 | Shaukat Tarin | Finance and Revenue | 27 December 2021 | 10 April 2022 | PTI |
| 7 | Hammad Azhar | Economic Affairs | 8 July 2019 | 6 April 2020 | PTI |
| 7 | Hammad Azhar | Industries & Production | 7 April 2020 | 17 April 2021 | PTI |
| 7 | Hammad Azhar | Finance and Revenue | 29 March 2021 | 17 April 2021 | PTI |
| 7 | Hammad Azhar | Energy | 17 April 2021 | 10 April 2022 | PTI |
| 7 | Hammad Azhar | Revenue Division | 11 September 2018 | 7 July 2019 | PTI |
| 8 | Sheikh Rasheed Ahmad | Railways | 20-08-2018 | 11-12-2020 | AML(P) |
| 8 | Sheikh Rasheed Ahmad | Interior | 11 December 2020 | 10 April 2022 | AML(P) |
| 9 | Khusro Bakhtiar | Planning, Development and Reform | 20 August 2018 | 18 November 2019 | PTI |
| 9 | Khusro Bakhtiar | Statistics | 11 December 2018 | 4 April 2019 | PTI |
| 9 | Khusro Bakhtiar | National Food Security & Research | 19 November 2019 | 6 April 2020 | PTI |
| 9 | Khusro Bakhtiar | Economic Affairs | 7 April 2020 | 17 April 2021 | PTI |
| 9 | Khusro Bakhtiar | Industries & Production | 17 April 2021 | 10 April 2022 | PTI |
| 10 | Shafqat Mahmood | Federal Education and Professional Training | 20 August 2018 | 10 April 2022 | PTI |
| 10 | Shafqat Mahmood | National History, and Literary Heritage Division | 20 August 2018 | 10 April 2022 | PTI |
| 11 | Ijaz Ahmed Shah | Parliamentary Affairs | 2 April 2019 | 17 April 2019 | PTI |
| 11 | Ijaz Ahmed Shah | Interior | 18 April 2019 | 11 December 2020 | PTI |
| 11 | Ijaz Ahmed Shah | Narcotics Control | 11 December 2020 | 10 April 2022 | PTI |
| 12 | Syed Fakhar Imam | National Food Security and Research | 6 April 2020 | 10 April 2022 | PTI |
| 13 | Omar Ayub | Power Division | 11 September 2018 | 10 April 2022 | PTI |
| 13 | Omar Ayub | Petroleum Division | 6 May 2019 | 17 April 2021 | PTI |
| 13 | Omar Ayub | Economic Affairs | 17 April 2021 | 10 April 2022 | PTI |
| 14 | Ghulam Sarwar Khan | Petroleum Division | 20 August 2018 | 17 April 2019 | PTI |
| 14 | Ghulam Sarwar Khan | Aviation | 18 April 2019 | 10 April 2022 | PTI |
| 15 | Ali Haider Zaidi | Maritime Affairs | 11 September 2018 | 10 April 2022 | PTI |
| 16 | Murad Saeed | State & Frontier Regions (State Minister) | 11 September 2018 | 17 September 2018 | PTI |
| 16 | Murad Saeed | Communications (State Minister) | 18 September 2018 | 16 December 2018 | PTI |
| 16 | Murad Saeed | Postal Services (State Minister) | 26 October 2018 | 16 December 2018 | PTI |
| 16 | Murad Saeed | Communications | 17 December 2018 | 10 April 2022 | PTI |
| 16 | Murad Saeed | Postal Services | 17 December 2018 | 3 February 2020 | PTI |
| 17 | Azam Swati | Science & Technology | 5 October 2018 | 6 December 2018 | PTI |
| 17 | Azam Swati | Parliamentary Affairs | 19 April 2019 | 7 April 2020 | PTI |
| 17 | Azam Swati | Narcotics Control | 7 April 2020 | 11 December 2020 | PTI |
| 17 | Azam Swati | Railways | 11 December 2020 | 10 April 2022 | PTI |
| 18 | Farogh Naseem | Law and Justice | 20 August 2018 | 26 November 2019 | MQM-P |
| 18 | Farogh Naseem | Law and Justice | 29 November 2019 | 1 June 2020 | MQM-P |
| 18 | Farogh Naseem | Law and Justice | 24 July 2020 | 1 April 2022 | MQM-P |
| 19 | Syed Aminul Haque | Information Technology and Telecommunication | 6 April 2020 | 31 March 2022 | MQM-P |
| 20 | Tariq Bashir Cheema | States and Frontier Regions | 20 August 2018 | 5 September 2018 | PML(Q) |
| 20 | Tariq Bashir Cheema | Housing and Works | 6 September 2018 | 1 April 2022 | PML(Q) |
| 21 | Zubaida Jalal | Defence Production | 20 August 2018 | 10 April 2022 | BAP |
| 22 | Noor-ul-Haq Qadri | Religious Affairs and Inter-faith Harmony | 20 August 2018 | 10 April 2022 | PTI |
| 23 | Shireen Mazari | Human Rights | 20 August 2018 | 10 April 2022 | PTI |
| 24 | Fahmida Mirza | Coordination | 20 August 2018 | 10 April 2022 | GDA |
| 25 | Ali Amin Gandapur | Kashmir Affairs and Gilgit Baltistan | 5 October 2018 | 10 April 2022 | PTI |
| 26 | Moonis Elahi | Water Resources | 18 July 2021 | 10 April 2022 | PML(Q) |
| 27 | Muhammad Mian Soomro | Privatisation | 5 October 2018 | 10 April 2022 | PTI |
| 27 | Muhammad Mian Soomro | Aviation Division | 12 December 2018 | 17 April 2019 | PTI |
| 28 | Shibli Faraz | Information and Broadcasting | 28 April 2020 | 11 March 2021 | PTI |
| 28 | Shibli Faraz | Science and Technology | 17 April 2021 | 10 April 2022 | PTI |
| 29 | Sahabzada Mehboob Sultan | National Food Security & Research | 5 October 2018 | 18 November 2019 | PTI |
| 29 | Sahabzada Mehboob Sultan | States and Frontier Regions | 19 November 2019 | 10 April 2022 | PTI |
| 30 | Faisal Vawda | Water Resources | 5 October 2018 | 3 March 2021 | PTI |
| 31 | Abdul Hafeez Shaikh | Finance, Revenue and Economic Affairs (As Adviser) | 19 April 2019 | 11 December 2020 | PTI |
| 31 | Abdul Hafeez Shaikh | Finance and Revenue | 11 December 2020 | 29 March 2021 | PTI |
| 32 | Khalid Maqbool Siddiqui | Information Technology and Telecommunication | 20 August 2018 | 7 April 2020 | MQM-P |
| 33 | Ali Mohammad Mahar | Narcotics Control | 4 October 2018 | 21 May 2019 | PTI |

=== Minister of State ===
| # | Name | Portfolio | Assumed office | Left office | Party |
|---|---|---|---|---|---|
| 1 | Shabbir Ali Qureshi | Housing and Works | 11 September 2018 | 10 April 2022 | PTI |
| 2 | Ali Muhammad Khan | Parliamentary Affairs | 17 September 2018 | 10 April 2022 | PTI |
| 3 | Zartaj Gul | Climate Change | 5 October 2018 | 10 April 2022 | PTI |
| 4 | Farrukh Habib | Information and Broadcasting | 29 April 2021 | 10 April 2022 | PTI |
| 5 | Shehryar Afridi | Interior | 31 August 2018 | 17 April 2019 | PTI |
| 5 | Shehryar Afridi | State and Frontier Regions | 18 April 2019 | 25 September 2020 | PTI |
| 5 | Shehryar Afridi | Narcotics Control | 10 June 2019 | 25 September 2020 | PTI |

=== Advisors ===
| | Advisors to the Prime Minister | | | | | |
| | Name | Party | Portfolio | Status | Assumed office | Left office |
|---|---|---|---|---|---|---|
| 1 | Ishrat Hussain | PTI | Institutional Reforms and Austerity | Federal Minister | 20 August 2018 | 10 April 2022 |
| 2 | Musaddiq Abbasi | PTI | Interior and Accountability | Federal Minister | 26 January 2022 | 10 April 2022 |
| 3 | Abdul Razak Dawood | PTI | Commerce, Textile, Industry & Production and Investment | Federal Minister | 20 August 2018 | 6 April 2020 |
| 3 | Abdul Razak Dawood | PTI | Commerce and Investment | Federal Minister | 7 April 2020 | 10 April 2022 |
| 4 | Babar Awan | PTI | Parliamentary Affairs | Federal Minister | 6 April 2020 | 10 April 2022 |
| 5 | Ayub Afridi | PTI | Overseas Pakistanis & Human Resource Development | Federal Minister | 23 November 2021 | 10 April 2022 |
| 6 | Malik Amin Aslam | PTI | Climate Change | Federal Minister | 20 August 2018 | 22 July 2020 |
| 7 | Zaheer-ur-din Babar Awan | PTI | Parliamentary Affairs | Federal Minister | 20 August 2018 | 3 September 2018 |
| 7 | Zaheer-ur-din Babar Awan | PTI | Parliamentary Affairs | Federal Minister | 7 April 2020 | 10 April 2022 |
| 8 | Mirza Shahzad Akbar | PTI | Accountability & Interior | Federal Minister | 22 July 2020 | 24 January 2022 |
| 9 | Shaukat Fayaz Ahned Tarin | PTI | Finance and Revenue | Federal Minister | 17 October 2021 | 26 December 2021 |

=== Special Assistants ===
Special Assistant to the Prime Minister
| # | Name | Party | Portfolio | Status | Assumed office | Left office |
|---|---|---|---|---|---|---|
| 1 | Faisal Sultan | PTI | National Health Services, Regulation and Coordination | Federal Minister | 3 August 2020 | 10 April 2022 |
| 2 | Sania Nishtar | PTI | Ministry of Poverty Alleviation and Social Safety | Federal Minister | 10 June 2019 | 10 April 2022 |
| 3 | Shehzad Arbab | PTI | Establishment Division | Federal Minister | 11 April 2020 | 10 April 2022 |
| 4 | Moeed Yusuf | PTI | National Security Adviser | Federal Minister | 24 December 2019 | 10 April 2022 |
| 5 | Ayub Afridi | PTI | Overseas Pakistanis & Human Resource Development | Minister of State | 29 November 2021 | 10 April 2022 |
| 6 | Malik Aamir Dogar | PTI | Political Affairs | Minister of State | 15 November 2020 | 10 April 2022 |
| 7 | Waqar Masood Khan | PTI | Finance and Revenue | Minister of State | 6 October 2020 | 24 August 2021 |
| 8 | Ali Nawaz Awan | PTI | Capital Development Authority Affairs | Minister of State | 6 November 2018 | 10 April 2022 |
| 9 | Usman Dar | PTI | Youth Affairs | Honorary | 3 Dec 2018 | 10 April 2022 |
| 10 | Jamshed Iqbal Cheema | PTI | Food Security | Honorary | 19 April 2021 | 10 April 2022 |
| 11 | Raoof Hasan | PTI | Information and Broadcasting | Honorary | 24 October 2020 | 10 April 2022 |
| 12 | Tabish Gohar | PTI | Energy | Honorary | 30 March 2021 | 21 September 2021 |
| 13 | Yar Muhammad Rind | PTI | Water Resources, Power and Petroleum in Balochistan | Honorary | 20 March 2019 | 10 April 2022 |
| 14 | Shahbaz Gill | PTI | Political Communication | Honorary | 13 May 2020 | 10 April 2022 |
| 15 | Khalid Mansoor | PTI | CPEC affairs | Honorary | 3 August 2021 | 10 April 2022 |
| 16 | Shahzad Nawaz | PTI | Culture, Arts and Related Communications | Honorary | 16 November 2021 | 10 April 2022 |
| 17 | Arbab Ghulam Rahim | PTI | Sindh Affairs | Honorary | 28 July 2021 | 10 April 2022 |
| 18 | Makhdoom Syed Tariq Mahmood-Ul-Hassan | PTI | Overseas Pakistanis and Human Development | | 20 January 2022 | 10 April 2022 |
| 20 | Shahzain Bugti | JWP | Reconciliation and Harmony in Balochistan | Honorary | 7 July 2021 | 29 March 2022 |

== Dissolution ==
The government was dissolved on 3 April 2022 following the dissolution of the National Assembly of Pakistan by the President, Arif Alvi at the behest of the Prime Minister, Imran Khan. On 7 April, the Supreme Court of Pakistan ordered the restoration of the Federal Cabinet and National Assembly. During parliamentary proceedings on 10 April the government was defeated in a no-confidence motion against the prime minister, leading to the end of its tenure.

== See also ==
- Prime Ministership of Imran Khan
