= Abbasi government =

Cabinet of Pakistan (2017–2018)

Federal Cabinet under the Premiership of Shahid Khaqan Abbasi
- 46th Cabinet of Pakistan

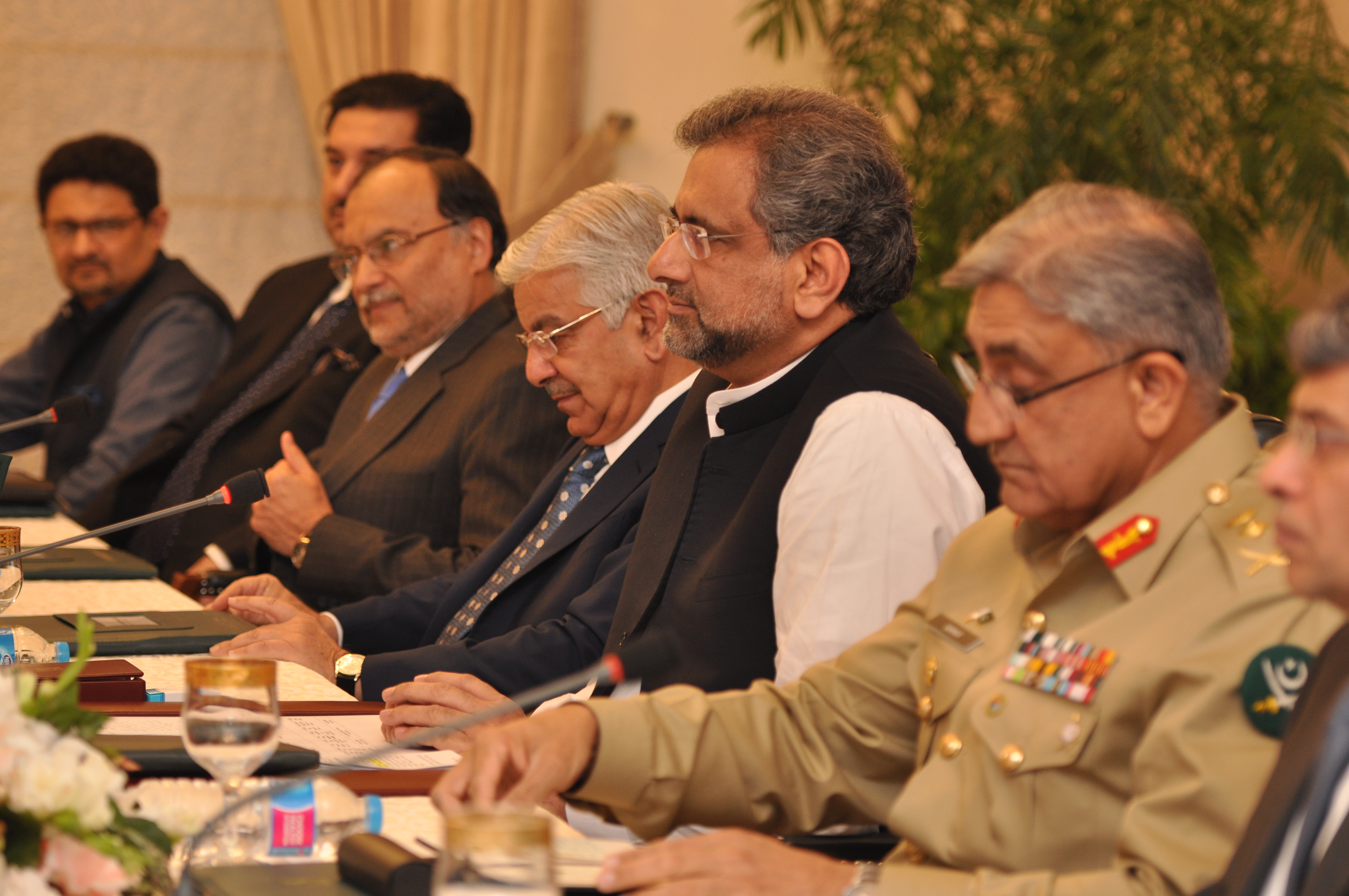
- Members of the Abbasi government.
- Date formed: 4 August 2017
- Date dissolved: 31 May 2018

People and organisations
- Head of state: Mamnoon Hussain
- Head of government: Shahid Khaqan Abbasi
- Member party: PMLN JUI (F) PML (F) NP; MQM-P
- Opposition party: PPP
- Opposition leader: Khurshid Shah

History
- Outgoing election: Senators; Minority; National Assembly; Majority
- Legislature terms: 14th Parliament of Pakistan
- Predecessor: Third Nawaz Sharif government
- Successor: Mulk caretaker government

The Abbasi government was formed by Shahid Khaqan Abbasi on 4 August 2017 to begin a new government following the disqualification of former Prime Minister of Pakistan Nawaz Sharif until the end of May 2018 when justice Nasirul Mulk took oath as new caretaker prime minister. The government, a Pakistan Muslim League (N) majority government, succeeded the third Nawaz Sharif government, which was formed following the 2013 general election and had dissolved in the July 2017 after Nawaz Sharif was disqualification by the Supreme Court of Pakistan to hold the office of Prime Minister.

The government retained relatively the same cabinet as the one prior, composed mostly of Pakistan Muslim League (N) politicians, while continuing the policies of the previous Prime minister, Nawaz Sharif, while still making policy changes.

== Cabinet ==
Federal ministers
Portfolio	Minister	Term	Ref
Prime Minister; Federal Minister of Energy	Shahid Khaqan Abbasi	August 2017 — May 2018	
Federal Minister of Finance, Revenue and Economic Affairs	Ishaq Dar	August 2017 — November 2017	
Federal Minister of Finance, Revenue and Economic Affairs	Miftah Ismail	December 2017 — May 2018	
Federal Minister of Defence; Federal Minister of Foreign Affairs	Khurram Dastgir Khan	August 2017 — May 2018; May 2018	
Federal Minister of Foreign Affairs	Khawaja Muhammad Asif	August 2017 — April 2018	
Federal Minister of Interior; Federal Minister of Planning and Development	Ahsan Iqbal	August 2017 — May 2018; September 2017 — May 2018	
Federal Minister of Commerce and Textile	Muhammad Pervaiz Malik	August 2017 — May 2018	
Federal Minister of Railways	Khawaja Saad Rafique	August 2017 — May 2018	
Federal Minister of Religious Affairs and Inter-faith Harmony	Sardar Muhammad Yousuf	August 2017 — May 2018	
Federal Minister of Parliamentary Affairs	Sheikh Aftab Ahmed	August 2017 — May 2018	
Federal Minister of States and Frontier Regions	Abdul Qadir Baloch	August 2017 — May 2018	
Federal Minister of Communications	Hafiz Abdul Kareem	August 2017 — May 2018	
Federal Minister of Housing and Works	Akram Khan Durrani	August 2017 — May 2018	
Federal Minister of Postal Services	Maulana Ameer Zaman	August 2017 — May 2018	
Federal Minister for Power	Awais Leghari	October 2017 — May 2018	
Federal Minister of Industries and Production	Ghulam Murtaza Jatoi	August 2017 — May 2018	
Federal Minister of Maritime Affairs	Hasil Bizenjo	August 2017 — May 2018	
Federal Minister of Water Resources	Syed Javed Ali Shah	August 2017 — May 2018	
Federal Minister of Statistics	Kamran Michael	August 2017 — May 2018	
Federal Minister of Federal Education and Professional Training	Muhammad Baligh Ur Rehman	August 2017 — May 2018	
Federal Minister of Kashmir Affairs and Gilgit-Baltistan	Barjees Tahir	August 2017 — May 2018	
Federal Minister of Climate Change	Mushahid Ullah Khan	August 2017 — May 2018	
Federal Minister of Inter-Provincial Coordination	Riaz Hussain Pirzada	August 2017 — May 2018	
Federal Minister of Overseas Pakistanis and Human Resource Development	Pir Sadaruddin Shah	August 2017 — May 2018	
Federal Minister of National Health Services, Regulation and Coordination	Saira Afzal Tarar	August 2017 — May 2018	
Federal Minister of Narcotics Control	Salahuddin Tirmizi	August 2017 — May 2018	
Federal Minister of National Food Security and Research	Sikandar Hayat Khan Bosan	August 2017 — May 2018	
Federal Minister of Defence Production; Federal Minister of Science and Technology	Rana Tanveer Hussain	August 2017 — May 2018; November 2017 — May 2018	
Federal Minister of Law and Justice	Zahid Hamid	August 2017 — November 2017	
Federal Minister of Law and Justice	Zafarullah Khan	November 2017 — May 2018	
Federal Minister for Privatisation	Daniyal Aziz	August 2017 — May 2018	
Federal Minister for Human Rights	Mumtaz Ahmed Tarar	August 2017 — May 2018	
Ministers of State
Portfolio	Minister	Term	Ref
Minister of State for Overseas Pakistanis and Human Resource Development	Abdul Rehman Khan Kanju	August 2017 — May 2018	
Minister of State for Power	Abid Sher Ali	August 2017 — May 2018	
Minister of State for Information Technology and Telecommunication	Anusha Rahman	August 2017 — May 2018	
Minister of State for Inter-Provincial Coordination	Darshan Punshi	August 2017 — May 2018	
Minister of State for States and Frontier Regions	Ghalib Khan	August 2017 — May 2018	
Minister of State for Maritime Affairs	Chaudhry Jaffar Iqbal	August 2017 — May 2018	
Minister of State for Petroleum	Jam Kamal Khan	August 2017 — May 2018	
Minister of State for Information, Broadcasting, National History and Literary Heritage	Marriyum Aurangzeb	August 2017 — May 2018	
Minister of State for Parliamentary Affairs	Mohsin Shahnawaz Ranjha	October 2017- May 2018	
Minister of State for Commerce and Textile	Akram Ansari	August 2017 — May 2018	
Minister of State for Religious Affairs and Inter-faith Harmony	Muhammad Amin Ul Hasnat Shah	August 2017 — May 2018	
Minister of State for Industries and Production	Arshad Khan Leghari	August 2017 — May 2018	
Minister of State for Communications	Muhammad Junaid Anwar Chaudhry	August 2017 — May 2018	
Minister of State for Interior Affairs	Muhammad Tallal Chaudry	August 2017 — May 2018	
Minister of State for Capital Administration and Development	Tariq Fazal Chaudhry	August 2017 — May 2018	
Minister of State for Human Rights	Usman Ibrahim	August 2017 — May 2018	
Minister of State for National Food Security and Research	Syed Ayaz Ali Shah Sheerazi	August 2017 — May 2018	
Minister of State for Science and Technology	Mir Dostain Khan Domki	August 2017 — May 2018	
Minister of State for Finance	Rana Afzal Khan	December 2017 — May 2018	
