= Mulk caretaker government =

Caretaker government of Pakistan in 2018

Caretaker Cabinet Under Justice (retd) Nasir-ul-Mulk
- 47th Cabinet of Pakistan
- 2018
- Date formed: 5 June 2018
- Date dissolved: 18 August 2018

People and organisations
- Head of state: Mamnoon Hussain
- Head of government: Nasirul Mulk
- Status in legislature: Caretaker government

History
- Predecessor: Abbasi government
- Successor: Imran Khan government

The Mulk caretaker government was the Pakistani caretaker federal government that was sworn into office on 5 June 2018.

It was sworn in per the Constitution of Pakistan, which required a caretaker government to be formed for the transition between the Abbasi government and the next government which would be decided in the 2018 Pakistani general election.

The Mulk Caretaker government was led by Nasir ul Mulk, a skilled jurist and former Chief Justice. The government’s sole focus was on legislative and administrative actions to ensure elections in 2018, the caretaker government also gave more power to the judicial complex, due to its ruling by a former Chief Justice. The government ruled for three months and was successful in its purpose of organizing elections, which resulted in its succession by the Imran Khan government.

== Cabinet ==
Federal ministers
Portfolio	Minister	Term
Prime Minister	Nasirul Mulk	1 June 2018-18 August 2018
Federal Minister of Foreign Affairs, Defence, Defence Production	Abdullah Hussain Haroon	5 June 2018-18 August 2018
Federal Minister of Finance and Revenue, Statistics, Planning, Industries and Production, Commerce and Textile, Privatisation	Shamshad Akhtar	5 June 2018-18 August 2018
Federal Minister of Interior, Inter-Provincial Coordination, Narcotics Control, Capital Administration and Development, Housing and Works	Azam Khan	5 June 2018-18 August 2018
Federal Minister of Law and Justice, Parliamentary Affairs, Information, Broadcasting, National History and Literary Heritage	Syed Ali Zafar	5 June 2018-18 August 2018
Federal Minister of Religious Affairs and Inter-faith Harmony, Federal Education and Professional Training, National Health Services, Regulation and Coordination	Mohammad Yusuf Shaikh	5 June 2018-18 August 2018
Federal Minister for Human Rights, Kashmir Affairs and Gilgit-Baltistan, States and Frontier Regions, Railways and Postal Services	Roshan Khursheed Bharucha	5 June 2018-18 August 2018
