= Haq Nawaz Akhtar =

Pakistani writer and public servant

Federal Secretary Ministry of Communications
- In office 7 January 1988 – 30 August 1989
- Preceded by: K. U. Fafooqi
- Succeeded by: Badruddin Zahidi

Federal Secretary Ministry of Religious Affairs and Interfaith Harmony
- In office 31 August 1989 – 26 March 1990
- Preceded by: Ch. Shoukat Ali
- Succeeded by: Muhammad Yousuf

Personal details
- Born: 1929 Sargodha Shahpur district(now Sargodha division)
- Died: 2019 Aged 90
- Occupation: Public Servant, Writer

Haq Nawaz Akhtar, also known as H. N. Akhtar (1929- 2019), was a Pakistani writer and public servant. His career spans across public service and literature. He has served in various capacities in the Government of Pakistan. As a Federal Secretary, he served in the Communication Division and the Ministry of Religious Affairs and Interfaith Harmony. Akhtar is known for his works in Urdu, including the book Elaan-e-Junoon and several ghazals. He also authored If Truth be Told: An Alternate History of Pakistan, providing an alternate perspective on the history of Pakistan.

== Career ==
=== Public service ===
Akhtar joined the Civil Services of Pakistan in 1954. He served as Controller of Capital Issues, managing director of Pak Libya Holding Company and Chairman of Pakistan Steel Mills. He was promoted to the post of Federal Secretary in 1985. Akhtar also served as Federal Secretary in the Communications Division 7 January 1988 to 30 August 1989 and Federal Secretary in the Ministry of Religious Affairs and Inter-faith Harmony from 31 August 1989 to 26 March 1990.

=== Literary contributions ===
Akhtar has made contributions to Urdu literature in the form of books and poetry including;

- Elaan-e-Junoon (1988)
- If Truth be Told: An Alternate History of Pakistan (2007)

== Death ==
Akhtar died in 2019. He resided at a grandnephew's residence in Islamabad during his final years till his demise.
