= Chaudhary Mubeen Arif Jutt =

Member of the National Assembly of Pakistan from Gujranwala (2024–2029)

- چوہدری مبین عارف جٹ

Member of the National Assembly of Pakistan
- Incumbent
- Assumed office 29 February 2024
- Constituency: NA-78 Gujranwala-II

Personal details
- Party: PTI (2024-present)

Chaudhary Muhammad Mubeen Arif Jutt (Urdu: چوہدری محمد مبین عارف جٹ) is a Pakistani politician who is a member of the National Assembly of Pakistan.

== Political career ==
Jutt won the 2024 Pakistani general election from NA-78 Gujranwala-II as an Independent candidate supported by the Pakistan Tehreek-e-Insaf (PTI). He received 106,504 votes, defeating former foreign minister, Khurram Dastgir, of the Pakistan Muslim League (N) (PML(N)).
