= Abdul Qadir Baloch =

Retired Pakistan Army general and member of the National Assembly of Pakistan

Minister for States and Frontier Regions
- In office 7 June 2013 – 31 May 2018
- Prime Minister: Nawaz Sharif; Shahid Khaqan Abbasi
- Preceded by: Najmuddin Khan
- Succeeded by: Roshan Khursheed Bharucha (caretaker)

17th Governor of Balochistan
- In office 1 February 2003 – 11 August 2003
- Chief Minister: Jan Mohammad Jamali
- Preceded by: Amir-ul-Mulk Mengal
- Succeeded by: Owais Ahmed Ghani

Member of the National Assembly of Pakistan
- In office 17 March 2008 – 31 May 2018
- Constituency: NA-271 (Kharan-Panjgur)

Personal details
- Born: 9 April 1945 (age 81) Quetta, Balochistan, British Raj
- Party: Pakistan Peoples Party (2021–2025)
- Other political affiliations: Pakistan Muslim League (N) (2010–2021)
- Children: 4
- Education: Pakistan Military Academy; Command and Staff College; National Defence University
- Civilian awards: Tamgha-i-Imtiaz

Military service
- Allegiance: Pakistan
- Branch/service: Pakistan Army
- Years of service: 1966 – 2003
- Rank: Lt. Gen.
- Unit: 16 Baloch Regiment
- Commands: XXX Corps; XII Corps; 19th Infantry Division
- Battles/wars: Indo-Pakistani War of 1971; Kargil War; 2001 India-Pakistan Standoff; War on terror
- Military awards: Sitara-i-Jurat; Hilal-i-Jurat

Abdul Qadir Baloch (Urdu: عبد القادر بلوچ; born 9 April 1945) is a Pakistani politician and retired army general who served as Minister for States and Frontier Regions in the third Sharif ministry from 2013 to 2017, and in the Abbasi cabinet from August 2017 to May 2018. A leader of the Pakistan Muslim League (Nawaz), Baloch briefly served as the Governor of Balochistan during Pervez Musharraf rule in 2003.

Baloch had been a member of the National Assembly of Pakistan from 2008 to May 2018.

== Early life ==
Baloch was born on 9 April 1945 and hails from the Kharan District of Balochistan, Pakistan.

== Military career ==
Baloch was appointed as field operations commander of the XXX Corps where he oversaw the redeployment of the military troops near border with India. In the wake of the 9/11 attacks in the United States, he was assigned as field operations commander of the XII Corps which had the area of responsibility of the Balochistan.

== Political career ==
=== Independent ===
In 2001, Baloch was appointed as Martial Law Administrator of Balochistan. In 2003, he received honorable discharge from the army and prematurely retired from the military as corps commander of Quetta to be appointed as Governor of Balochistan.

In the 2008 Pakistani general election, Baloch elected as member of the National Assembly of Pakistan from constituency NA-271.

=== Pakistan Muslim League (N) (2010–2021) ===
In 2010, he joined the Pakistan Muslim League (N). In August 2011, he was selected by PML(N) as the assistant secretaries-general of the PML-N for Balochistan.

In 2013, the PML(N) allotted a party ticket to Baloch for the constituency NA-271 to participate in the general elections. He performed well in the election and defeated Ahsanullah Raki of PPP. Later, he was appointed as Minister for States and Frontier Regions by the Prime Minister Nawaz Sharif and took oath on 8 June 2013.

He had ceased to hold ministerial office in July 2017 when the federal cabinet was disbanded following the resignation of Prime Minister Nawaz Sharif after Panama Papers case decision. Following the election of Shahid Khaqan Abbasi as Prime Minister of Pakistan, Baloch was inducted into the federal cabinet of Abbasi and was appointed Minister for States and Frontier Regions for the second time. Upon the dissolution of the National Assembly on the expiration of its term on 31 May 2018, Baloch ceased to hold the office as Federal Minister for States and Frontier Regions.

On 31 October 2020, Baloch decided to resign from the PML-N due to differences with the party's chief Nawaz Sharif and the party's decision not to invite former Balochistan Chief Minister Sardar Sanaullah Zehri, also a leader of the PMLN, to a public gathering of the Pakistan Democratic Movement. The reason the PMLN leadership cited for not inviting Zehri was his tribal differences with Sardar Akhtar Mengal of the Balochistan National Party. Ahsan Iqbal, a senior leader of the PMLN, said Mr. Baloch had the choice to resign if he wished to do so.

Following his resignation, he stated that he could not hold long with the anti-military narrative of the party.

=== Pakistan People's Party (2021–2025) ===
On 8 August 2021 he joined the PPP, who has also held an anti-military narrative calling Former Prime Minister Imran Khan, as selected.

On July 16 2025, he resigned from the PPP.

== Publications ==
- The Balochistan Conflict, Pakistan Institute of Legislative Development and Transparency, 2007, 17 p.

Political offices
Preceded by Amir-ul-Mulk Mengal	Governor of Balochistan; 1 February 2003 – 11 August 2003	Succeeded by Owais Ahmed Ghani
