= Darshan Punshi =

Pakistani politician

- درشن پنشی

Member of the National Assembly of Pakistan
- In office 13 August 2018 – 10 August 2023
- Constituency: Reserved seat for minorities
- In office 2008 – 31 May 2018
- Constituency: Reserved seat for minorities

Minister of State for Inter Provincial Coordination
- In office 4 August 2017 – 31 May 2018
- President: Mamnoon Hussain
- Prime Minister: Shahid Khaqan Abbasi

Personal details
- Party: PMLN (1993-present)

Darshan Punshi (Urdu: درشن پنشی) is a Pakistani politician who had been a member of the National Assembly of Pakistan from August 2018 till August 2023. Previously he was member of the National Assembly from 2008 to May 2018. He served as Minister of State for Inter Provincial Coordination, in Abbasi cabinet from August 2017 to May 2018.

== Political career ==
Punshi was elected to the National Assembly of Pakistan on a seat reserved for minorities as a candidate of Pakistan Muslim League (N) (PML-N) in the 2008 Pakistani general election.

He was re-elected to the National Assembly as a candidate of PML-N on a seat reserved for minorities in the 2013 Pakistani general election. During his tenure as Member of the National Assembly, he served as the Federal Parliamentary Secretary for National Health Services, Regulations and Coordination.

Following the election of Shahid Khaqan Abbasi as Prime Minister of Pakistan in August 2017, he was inducted into the federal cabinet of Abbasi. He is believed to be the first Hindu federal cabinet member in Pakistan in 25 years. He was appointed as the Minister of State for Inter Provincial Coordination. Upon the dissolution of the National Assembly on the expiration of its term on 31 May 2018, Punshi ceased to hold the office as Minister of State for Inter Provincial Coordination.

He was re-elected to the National Assembly as a candidate of PML-N on a reserved seat for minorities in the 2018 Pakistani general election.
