= Kamran Michael =

Pakistani politician (born 1973)

Senator Kamran Michael

Minister for Statistics
- In office 4 August 2017 – 31 May 2018
- President: Mamnoon Hussain
- Prime Minister: Shahid Khaqan Abbasi
- Preceded by: Office established
- Succeeded by: Shamshad Akhtar

Minister for Human Rights
- In office 21 May 2016 – 28 July 2017
- President: Mamnoon Hussain
- Prime Minister: Nawaz Sharif

Minister for Ports and Shipping
- In office 8 June 2013 – 21 May 2016
- President: Mamnoon Hussain
- Prime Minister: Nawaz Sharif
- Preceded by: Babar Ghauri
- Succeeded by: Hasil Bizenjo

Member of the Senate of Pakistan
- Incumbent
- Assumed office 12 March 2012

Personal details
- Born: October 9, 1973 (age 53) Lahore, Punjab, Pakistan
- Party: PMLN (1993–present)
- Education: Punjab University; BA

Kamran Michael (Urdu: کامران مائیکل) is a Pakistani politician who served as Minister for Statistics, in Abbasi cabinet from August 2017 to May 2018. He previously served as the Minister for Human Rights in the third Sharif ministry from 2013 to 2017. A member of the Pakistan Muslim League (Nawaz), Michael held the cabinet portfolio of Minister for Ports and Shipping from 2013 to 2016.

Michael has been an elected member of the Senate of Pakistan on minorities seat since 2012 and has served as the Provincial Minister for Minorities Affairs, Human Rights, Women development, Social Welfare and Finance in the Provincial Assembly of Punjab.

In 2016, he moved the Hindu marriage bill in 2016, which later became law.

== Political career ==
Michael started his political career in 2001 after getting elected as Councillor. Later he was elected as Member of Lahore District Council.

Michael was elected as member of the Provincial Assembly of Punjab for the first time in the 2002 Pakistani general election on one of the eight seats reserved for minorities. He was re-elected as the member of the Provincial Assembly of the Punjab for a second term in the 2008 Pakistani general election. He was appointed as provincial minister of Punjab for human rights, provincial minister for Minority Affairs, provincial minister for Social Welfare and provincial minister for Women development. In 2010, he was appointed as the provincial minister for Finance

Michael was elected member of the Senate of Pakistan in 2012 for the first time on a seat reserved for minorities after assassination of Shahbaz Bhatti. Upon PML-N victory in the 2013 Pakistani general election, Michael was made the Minister for Ports and Shipping in June 2013 where he served until May 2016. In 2016, he was appointed as Minister for Human Rights.

He had ceased to hold ministerial office in July 2017 when the federal cabinet was disbanded following the resignation of Prime Minister Nawaz Sharif after Panama Papers case decision. Following the election of Shahid Khaqan Abbasi as Prime Minister of Pakistan in August 2017, he was inducted into the federal cabinet of Abbasi. He was appointed as the Federal Minister for Statistics.

He was nominated by PML-N as its candidate in the 2018 Pakistani Senate election. However the Election Commission of Pakistan declared all PML-N candidates for the Senate election as independent after a ruling of the Supreme Court of Pakistan.

He was re-elected to the Senate as an independent candidate on a reserved seat for non-Muslim from Punjab in Senate election. On 12 March 2018, he ceased to hold the office of Federal Minister for Statistics due to expiration of his term in the Senate. On 15 March 2018, he was re-inducted into the federal cabinet of Prime Minister Shahid Khaqan Abbasi and was re-appointed as Federal Minister for Statistics.

He joined the treasury benches, led by PML-N after assuming the office of Senator. Upon the dissolution of the National Assembly on the expiration of its term on 31 May 2018, Michael ceased to hold the office as Federal Minister for Statistics.

Political offices
Preceded by	Minister for Ports and Shipping; 2013–2016	Succeeded by
Preceded by	Minister for Human Rights; 2016–2017	Incumbent
