= Ayub Afridi =

Ayub Afridi may refer to:

- Ayub Afridi (politician), Pakistani senator
- Ayub Afridi (drug lord), Pakistani drug lord
