= Council of Common Interests =

Constitutional body in the Government of Pakistan

Agency overview
- Formed: 14 August 1973; 53 years ago
- Jurisdiction: Government of Pakistan
- Headquarters: Islamabad
- Minister responsible: vacant
- Parent department: Ministry of Inter Provincial Coordination
- Website: cci.gov.pk

The Council of Common Interests (CCI) (Urdu: مشترکہ مفادات ہیئتِ, romanized: Muśtarkāh Mufādāt He'at) is an eight-member federal constitutional body in the government of Pakistan. It is appointed by the president on the prime minister's advice, and resolves the disputes of power sharing between the federation and its provinces (with chief ministers representing their respective provinces). The Council works under the Ministry of Inter Provincial Coordination and is responsible to both houses of the Parliament, the Senate and the National Assembly.

== History ==
The Council of Common Interests was formed under the 1973 Constitution of Pakistan. Until 2010 the body worked under Cabinet Division. After the passing of the 18th amendment the body was transferred to the Ministry of Inter Provincial Coordination on 4 March 2010.

== Membership ==
After passage of the Eighteenth Constitutional Amendment in April 2010, it is mandatory for the Council to meet at least once in ninety days. Membership of the CCI consists of the following:

Prime Minister of Pakistan (Chairman of the Council)	Shehbaz Sharif
Four provincial Chief Ministers
Chief Minister of Punjab	Maryam Nawaz
Chief Minister of Khyber Pakhtunkhwa	Governor's Rule
Chief Minister of Balochistan	Sarfraz Bugti
Chief Minister of Sindh	Syed Murad Ali Shah
Three federal ministers nominated by the Prime Minister
Deputy Prime Minister, Minister for Foreign Affairs	Ishaq Dar
Minister of Defence	Khawaja Asif
Minister of States and Frontier Regions	Amir Muqam

== See also ==
- Ministry of Inter Provincial Coordination
- Eighteenth Amendment to the Constitution of Pakistan
- Federalism in Pakistan
- Constitution of Pakistan
- Inter-State Commission
- Inter-State Council
