= Parsi Colony =

Residential district of Parsi people of Pakistan

Parsi Colony is a residential area located in Quetta, Pakistan. It is part of Parsi community in Pakistan.

The area was once part of thriving Parsi community in Quetta. It was allocated to Parsis during British Raj. Today, only three or four families are left.

== Notable residents ==
- Roshan Khursheed Bharucha
