= Shujaat =

Given name

Shujaat is a masculine given name and surname of Arabic origin. Notable people with the name include:

== Given name ==
- Shujaat Azeem (born 1951), Advisor to Prime Minister of Pakistan Mian Muhammad Nawaz Sharif on Aviation (2013–2016)
- Shujaat Bukhari (1968–2018), Indian journalist, founding editor of Rising Kashmir, a Srinagar-based newspaper
- Shujaat Hashmi (died 2026), Pakistani actor
- Shujaat Ali Hasnie (1905–1968), Pakistani banker, the 3rd Governor of the State Bank of Pakistan
- Shujaat Hussain (born 1946), senior Pakistani conservative politician and business oligarch
- Shujaat Ahmed Khan (born 1947), Pakistani politician, Member of the Provincial Assembly of the Punjab
- Shujaat Ali Khan (born 1964), Justice of the Lahore High Court
- Shujaat Khan (born 1960), North Indian musician and sitar player
- Shujaat Nawaz, Pakistani politician, member of the Provincial Assembly of the Punjab
- Shujaat Ali Quadri (born 1989), Indian student activist and journalist
- Syed Shujaat Ali Qadri (1941–1993), the first Grand Mufti of Pakistan, Judge of Federal Shariat Court

== Surname ==
- Khushbakht Shujaat (born 1948), Pakistani politician, member of the Senate of Pakistan

== See also ==
- Nishan-e-Shujaat, Order of Bravery, a Pakistan award for military and civilian acts of conspicuous gallantry
