= Roshan Khursheed Bharucha =

Pakistani politician

Roshan Khursheed Bharucha Senator

Caretaker Federal Minister for Human Rights, Kashmir Affairs and Gilgit-Baltistan, States and Frontier Regions
- In office 5 May 2018 – 18 August 2018
- President: Mamnoon Hussain
- Prime Minister: Nasirul Mulk (caretaker)
- Preceded by: Khawaja Saad Rafique
- Succeeded by: Shireen Mazari (Minister of Human Rights)

Caretaker Federal Minister for Railways and Postal Services
- In office 5 May 2018 – 18 August 2018
- President: Mamnoon Hussain
- Prime Minister: Nasirul Mulk (caretaker)
- Succeeded by: Sheikh Rasheed Ahmad (Minister of Railways)

Member of the Senate of Pakistan
- In office March 2003 – March 2009
- President: Pervaiz Musharraf
- Prime Minister: Shaukat Aziz
- Constituency: Women seat from Balochistan

Provincial Minister of Balochistan for Women Development
- In office Oct 2007 – April 2008
- Chief Minister: Mohammad Saleh Bhutani
- In office October 1999 – November 2002
- Chief Minister: Amir-ul-Mulk Mengal

Personal details
- Born: Quetta, Balochistan, Pakistan
- Children: 3

Roshan Khursheed Bharucha is a Pakistani politician who served as the Federal Minister for Human Rights, Kashmir Affairs and Gilgit-Baltistan, States and Frontier Regions, Railways and Postal Services in a caretaker capacity.

== Early life and education ==
Barucha's father migrated to Balochistan from Yazd, Iran while his mother is from Gujarat, India.

Barucha holds a master's degree in English from the University of Balochistan and a degree in finance and accounting for non-financial executives from PIMS Karachi which she completed in 1993.

== Political career ==
She has served as a provincial minister of Balochistan between 1999 and 2002, and as a member of the Senate of Pakistan from March 2003 to March 2009.

In 2007, she was made provincial minister of Balochistan for Social Welfare, Informal education, Human rights, Youth, Information, Population, Information Technology, Manpower training, Sports, Archives, and Culture in a caretaker capacity.

In 2018, she was made Federal Minister for Human Rights, Kashmir Affairs and Gilgit-Baltistan, States and Frontier Regions, Railways and Postal Services in Mulk caretaker ministry.

== Personal life ==
She hails from Quetta and is a member of the Parsi community in Pakistan. She is a mother of three children Kaiwan, Sharaine, and Thrity, as well as a grandmother to Cyrus, Shanaya, Darian, Nadia, Ariana, Aaron, and Ryan.
