= Shahid Usman Ibrahim =

Member of the National Assembly of Pakistan from Gujranwala (2024–2029)

- شاہد عثمان ابراہیم

Member of the National Assembly of Pakistan
- Incumbent
- Assumed office 29 February 2024
- Constituency: NA-80 Gujranwala-IV

Personal details
- Party: PMLN (2024-present)
- Parent: Usman Ibrahim (father)

Shahid Usman Ibrahim (Urdu: شاہد عثمان ابراہیم) is a Pakistani politician who has been a member of the National Assembly of Pakistan since February 2024.

== Political career ==
Ibrahim won the 2024 Pakistani general election from NA-80 Gujranwala-IV as a Pakistan Muslim League (N) (PML(N)) candidate. He received 98,206 votes while runner up Lala Asadullah, an independent candidate, (PTI) Supported Pakistan Tehreek-e-Insaf, received 95,007 votes.
