= NA-78 Gujranwala-II =

Constituency for the National Assembly of Pakistan

- Constituency for the National Assembly of Pakistan
- Region: Gujranwala City (Eastern part) in Gujranwala District
- Electorate: 571,563

Current constituency
- Party: Pakistan Tehreek-e-Insaf
- Member: Chaudhary Mubeen Arif Jutt
- Created from: NA-95 Gujranwala-I

NA-78 Gujranwala-II (این اے-78، گوجرانوالہ-2) is a constituency for the National Assembly of Pakistan.

== Members of Parliament ==
=== 2018–2023: NA-81 Gujranwala-III ===
Election	Member	Party
2018	Khurram Dastgir	PML (N)

=== 2024–present: NA-78 Gujranwala-II ===
Election	Member	Party
2024	Chaudhary Mubeen Arif Jutt	PTI

== Election 2002 ==
General elections were held on 10 October 2002. Chaudhry Imran Ullah Advocate of PPP won by 28,024 votes.

General election 2002: NA-95 Gujranwala-I
Party	Candidate	Votes	%	±%
PPP	Ch. Imran Ullah	28,024	34.56	
PML(N)	Usman Ibrahim	26,977	33.26	
MMA	Muhammad Ayub Safdar	18,107	22.33	
PML(Q)	Muhamamd Imran Ullah Ch.	6,702	8.26	
PTI	Ch. Khalid Zafar Sansi	1,289	1.59	
Turnout		83,311	33.73	
Total valid votes		81,099	97.35	
Rejected ballots		2,212	2.65	
Majority		1,047	1.30	
Registered electors		247,002		

== Election 2008 ==
General elections were held on 18 February 2008. Usman Ibrahim of PML-N won by 51,705 votes.

General election 2008: NA-95 Gujranwala-I
Party	Candidate	Votes	%	±%
PML(N)	Usman Ibrahim	51,705	47.94	
PPP	Ch. Zeshan Ilyas	44,034	40.83	
PML(Q)	Ch. Imran Ullah	6,852	6.35	
Others	Others (eleven candidates)	5,256	4.88	
Turnout		109,960	33.45	
Total valid votes		107,847	98.08	
Rejected ballots		2,113	1.92	
Majority		7,671	7.11	
Registered electors		328,711		
PML(N) gain from PPP				

== Election 2013 ==
General elections were held on 11 May 2013. Usman Ibrahim of PML-N won by 108,457 votes and became the member of National Assembly.

General election 2013: NA-95 Gujranwala-I
Party	Candidate	Votes	%	±%
PML(N)	Usman Ibrahim	108,457	65.23	
PTI	Ali Ashraf	27,838	16.74	
PPP	Ch. Muhammad Saddique	15,937	9.58	
Others	Others (nineteen candidates)	14,048	8.45	
Turnout		169,241	53.10	
Total valid votes		166,280	98.25	
Rejected ballots		2,961	1.75	
Majority		80,619	48.49	
Registered electors		318,739		
PML(N) hold				

== Election 2018 ==
General elections were held on 25 July 2018.

General election 2018: NA-81 Gujranwala-III
Party	Candidate	Votes	%	±%
PML(N)	Khurram Dastgir	130,837	51.76	
PTI	Chaudhary Muhammad Siddique	88,166	34.88	
Others	Others (eleven candidates)	28,203	11.16	
Turnout		252,753	50.58	
Rejected ballots		5,547	2.20	
Majority		42,671	16.88	
Registered electors		499,681		
PML(N) hold		Swing	N/A	

== Election 2024 ==
General elections were held on 8 February 2024. Chaudhary Mubeen Arif Jutt won the election with 106,504 votes.

General election 2014: NA-78 Gujranwala-II
Party	Candidate	Votes	%	±%
PTI	Chaudhary Mubeen Arif Jutt (Note: Filed nomination papers as PTI candidate but ECP allowed him to run as an Independent)	106,504	45.56	▲10.88
PML(N)	Khurram Dastgir	89,478	38.27	▼13.49
TLP	Muhammad Kamran	14,703	6.29	▲2.12
Others	Others (thirty-two candidates)	23,100	9.88	
Turnout		239,222	41.85	▼8.73
Total valid votes		233,785	97.73	
Rejected ballots		5,437	2.27	
Majority		17,026	7.28	
Registered electors		571,563		

== See also ==
- NA-77 Gujranwala-I
- NA-79 Gujranwala-III
