= Shahid Ashraf Tarar =

Pakistani civil servant

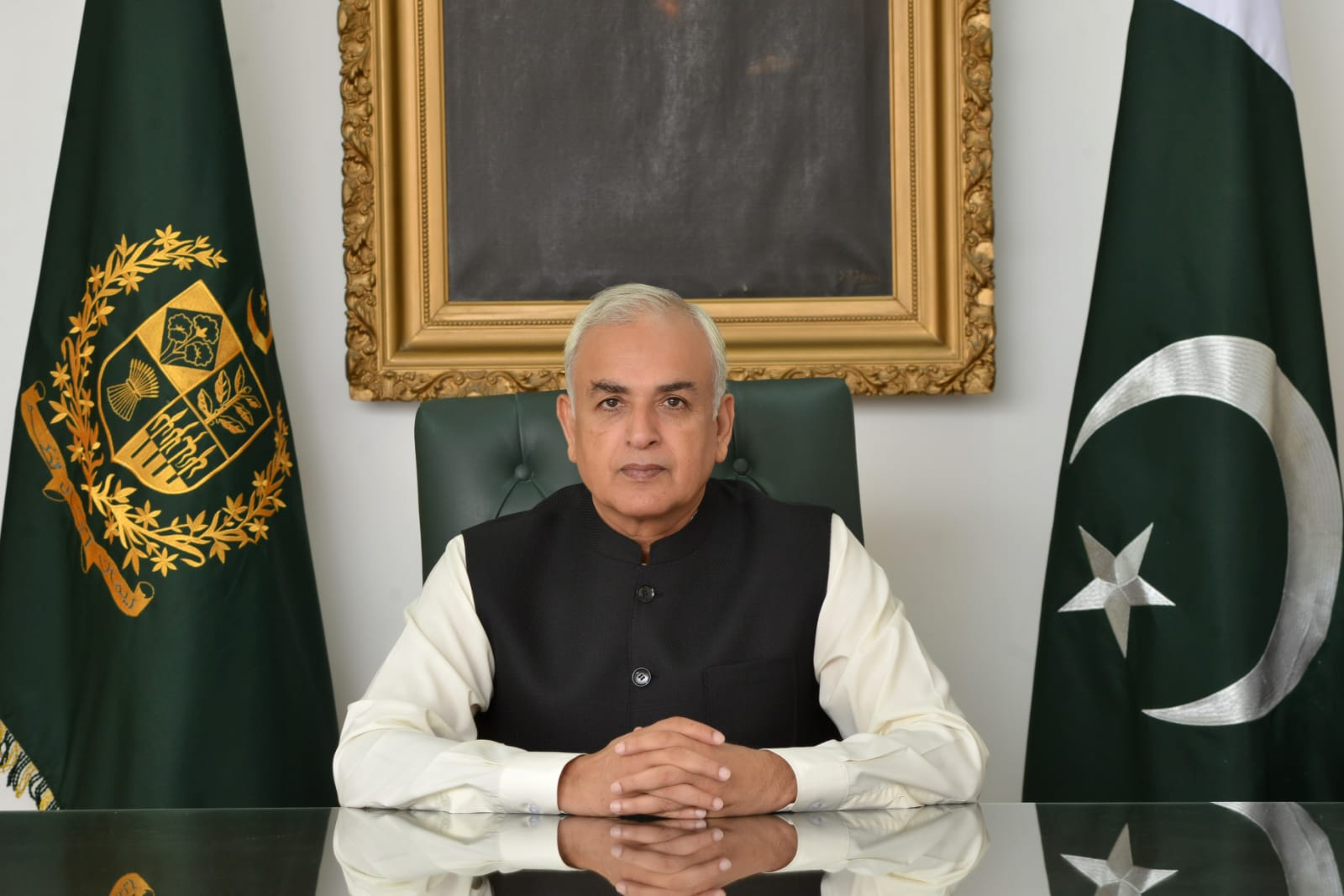

Advisor to the Chief Minister Punjab on Special Initiatives
- Incumbent
- Assumed office 25 October 2024

Chairman Ravi Urban Development Authority
- Incumbent
- Assumed office 11 December 2024

Chairman Air Punjab (Pvt.) Limited
- Incumbent
- Assumed office 28 October 2025

Chairman Punjab Central Business District Development Authority
- In office 11 December 2024 – 28 October 2025
- Succeeded by: Maryam Nawaz

Federal Caretaker Minister for Communications, Maritime, and Railways
- In office 17 August 2023 – 4 March 2024
- President: Arif Alvi
- Prime Minister: Anwaar ul Haq Kakar
- Succeeded by: Aleem Khan (Communications); Awais Leghari (Railways); Qaiser Ahmed Sheikh (Maritime)

Chairman Federal Public Service Commission
- In office July 2023 – August 2023

Secretary Ministry of Communication
- In office November 2014 – December 2017

Chairman National Highway Authority
- In office January 2014 – December 2017

Member Federal Public Service Commission
- In office January 2021 – July 2023

Executive Director World Bank Group
- In office January 2018 – January 2021

Personal details
- Profession: Civil Servant

Military service
- Rank: Captain (Retired)

Captain (R) Shahid Ashraf Tarar (Urdu: شاہد اشرف تارڑ) is a retired BPS-22 Pakistani civil servant who has served as Caretaker Federal Minister for Communications, Maritime and Railways from 17 August 2023 to 4 March 2024. His career spans various senior roles including Chairman National Highway Authority and Federal Public Service Commission. Notably, he was appointed the executive director of the World Bank Group on behalf of seven countries including Pakistan. Prior to his civil service, Tarar served in the Pakistan Army, retiring with the rank of Captain. Currently, He is serving as Advisor to Chief Minister Punjab on Special Initiatives. He is also holding the charge of Chairman Ravi Urban Development Authority and Chairman Air Punjab (Pvt.) Ltd. For one year, he also held the charge of Chairman Punjab Central Business District Development Authority.

== Career ==
Tarar belongs to Pakistan Administrative Service. He started his career as an Assistant Commissioner in Balochistan. He is a retired Federal Secretary who joined the 13th Common in the Civil Service after retiring from the Pakistan Army as a captain. He also served as Secretary Excise & Taxation Punjab, Director General National Vocational and Technical Training Commission (NAVTTC)

Tarar also served as the Chairman National Highway Authority (NHA) in the Nawaz Sharif-led government. He oversaw speedy and timely completion of multi-billion projects as the head of NHA at that time.

He has also been the Federal Secretary of the Ministry of Communications from November 2014 to December 2016.

In November 2018, Tarar was appointed an Executive Director World Bank Group by the seven countries comprising Pakistan. He was also appointed the Chairman Human Resources Committee of the World Bank Board.

Before joining as a caretaker minister, Tarar was appointed chairman Federal Public Service Commission by the Shahbaz Sharif-led government in July 2023. He was sworn in by President Dr. Arif Alvi.

Tarar was sworn in as the Caretaker Federal Minister in the Kakar Cabinet on 17 August 2023 and was allotted three portfolios: Communications, Maritime Affairs, Railways.
