= Musarrat Jamshed =

Pakistani politician

Member of the Provincial Assembly of the Punjab
- In office 15 August 2018 – 14 January 2023
- Constituency: Reserved seat for women

Personal details
- Born: 1 January 1981 (age 45) Renala Khurd, Punjab, Pakistan
- Other political affiliations: PTI (2018-2023)
- Spouse: Jamshed Iqbal Cheema
- Children: 2

Musarrat Jamshed is a Pakistani politician who had been a member of the Provincial Assembly of the Punjab from August 2018 till January 2023. She is married to Jamshed Iqbal Cheema who is also a Pakistan Tehreek-e-Insaf member and politician.

== Political career ==
She was elected to the Provincial Assembly of the Punjab as a candidate of Pakistan Tehreek-e-Insaf (PTI) on a reserved seat for women in the 2018 Pakistani general election.
