= Hasil Bizenjo =

Pakistani politician (1958–2020)

Senator Hasil Bizenjo
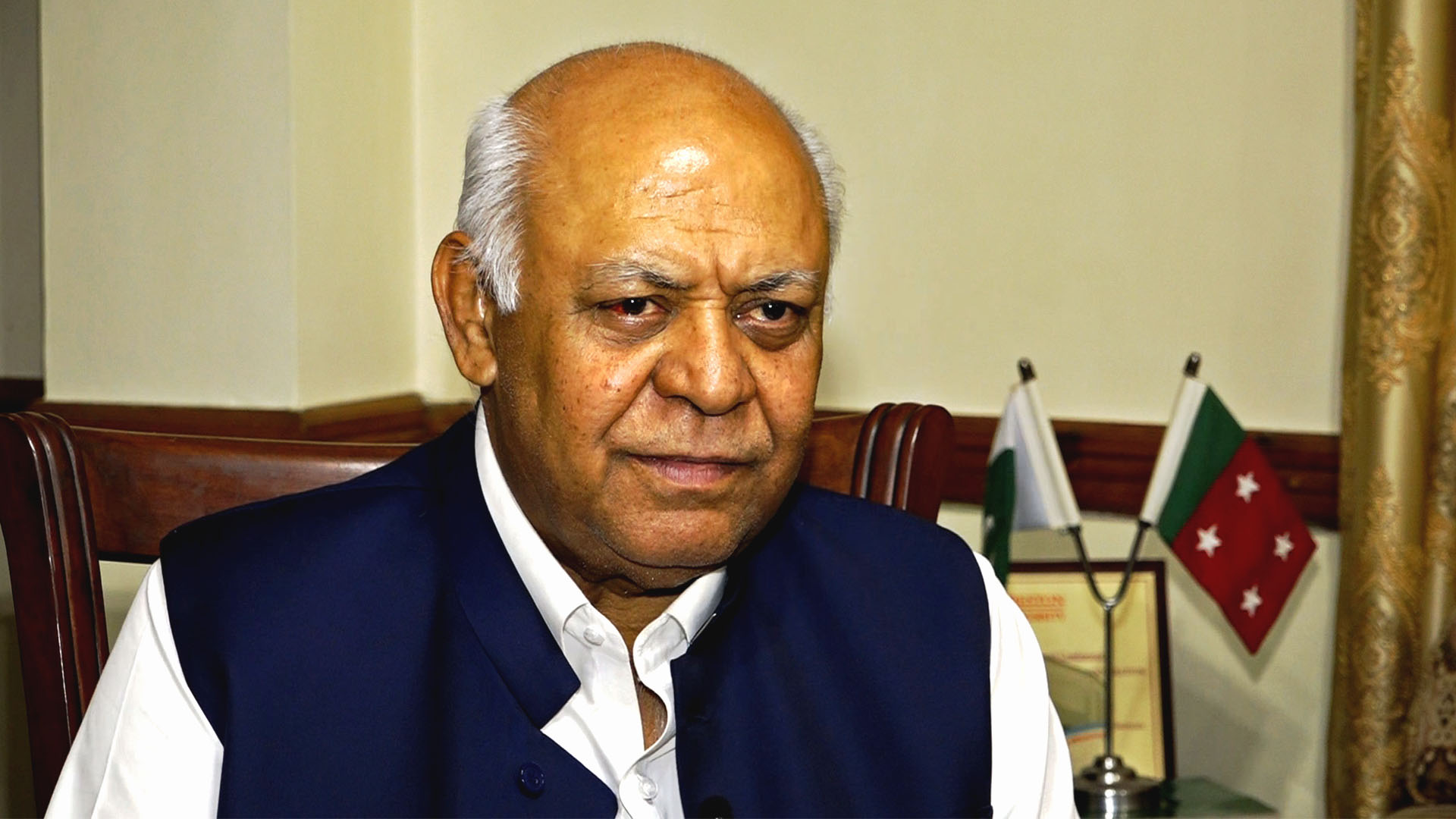

President of National Party (Pakistan)
- In office 10 November 2014 – 20 August 2020

Minister for Maritime Affairs
- In office 4 August 2017 – 31 May 2018
- President: Mamnoon Hussain
- Prime Minister: Shahid Khaqan Abbasi
- Preceded by: Himself
- Succeeded by: Ali Haider Zaidi
- In office 21 May 2016 – 28 July 2017
- President: Mamnoon Hussain
- Prime Minister: Nawaz Sharif
- Preceded by: Kamran Michael
- Succeeded by: Himself

Member of the Senate of Pakistan
- In office 12 March 2009 – 20 August 2020

Personal details
- Born: Mir Hasil Khan Bizenjo; 3 February 1958
- Died: 20 August 2020 (aged 62) Karachi, Pakistan
- Party: National Party of Pakistan
- Parent: Ghaus Bakhsh Bizenjo (father)

Mir Hasil Khan Bizenjo (3 February 1958 – 20 August 2020; Urdu: میر حاصل خان بزنجو) was a Pakistani politician who served as Minister for Maritime Affairs, in Abbasi cabinet from August 2017 to May 2018. He previously served as Minister for Maritime Affairs in the third Sharif ministry. The President of the National Party of Pakistan, Bizenjo had been an elected member of the Senate of Pakistan since 2009 and was a former member of the National Assembly of Pakistan. He was nominated as senate Chairman by opposition parties Rehbar committee.

== Political career ==
Bizenjo started his political career after getting elected member of National Assembly of Pakistan in the 1990 Pakistani general election on the seat of Pakistan National Party.

He was re-elected as a member of National Assembly in the 1997 Pakistani general election on the ticket of Balochistan National Party.

He founded Balochistan National Democratic Party, which later in 2003 merged with Baloch National Movement and as the result of this merger National Party was founded. He was elected president of National Party in 2014.

In 2009, he was elected as a member of the Senate of Pakistan for the first time. In 2015, he was re-elected to the Senate. In March 2015, he was nominated by Pakistan Muslim League (N) for the post of Chairman of the Senate of Pakistan.

In 2016, he was appointed as the Minister for Ports and Shipping in the third Sharif ministry. He had ceased to hold ministerial office in July 2017 when the federal cabinet was disbanded following the resignation of Prime Minister Nawaz Sharif after being found guilty in Panama Papers case decision.

Following the election of Shahid Khaqan Abbasi as Prime Minister of Pakistan in August 2017, Bizenjo was inducted into the federal cabinet of Abbasi. He was appointed as federal minister for Ports and Shipping which was later renamed as Ministry of Maritime Affairs in October 2017.

Upon the dissolution of the National Assembly on the expiration of its term on 31 May 2018, Bizenjo ceased to hold the office as Federal Minister for Maritime Affairs. On 11 July 2019, he was nominated as a candidate for Senate Chairmanship by Rehbar Committee.

== Death ==
Bizenjo was diagnosed with lung cancer in 2019. On 20 August 2020, he died in Karachi while undergoing treatment at a private. He was 62. Bizenjo was buried the following day at his ancestral graveyard in Naal, Khuzdar.

Political offices
Preceded by Kamran Michael	Minister for Ports and Shipping; 2016–2017	Succeeded by Hasil Bizenjo
