= Ghulam Dastgir Khan =

Pakistani politician

Member of the National Assembly of Pakistan
- In office 1990–1999
- Constituency: NA-76 (Gujranwala-III)
- In office March 1977 – July 1977
- Constituency: NA-100 (Gujranwala-III)

Personal details
- Party: Pakistan Muslim League (N) (1993 - present)
- Other political affiliations: Islami Jamhoori Ittehad (1988-1990)
- Relations: Azra Sabir Khan (sister-in-law)
- Children: Khurram Dastgir Khan (son)

Ghulam Dastgir Khan is a Pakistani politician who has been a member of the National Assembly of Pakistan from 1990 to 1999 and for brief in 1977.

== Political career ==
He was elected to the National Assembly of Pakistan from Constituency NA-100 (Gujranwala-III) in the 1977 Pakistani general election. In March 1981, he was appointed as Federal Minister for Labour Manpower and Overseas Pakistanis in the cabinet of President Muhammad Zia-ul-Haq where he served until February 1985. He also served as Federal Minister for Local Government and rural Development in the cabinet of President Muhammad Zia-ul-Haq from November 1983 to April 1984.

He ran for the seat of the National Assembly in the 1985 Pakistani general election but was unsuccessful.

He ran for the seat of the National Assembly as a candidate of Islami Jamhoori Ittehad (IJI) from Constituency NA-76 (Gujranwala-III) in the 1988 Pakistani general election but was unsuccessful and lost the seat to a candidate of Pakistan Peoples Party (PPP).

He was re-elected to the National Assembly as a candidate of IJI from Constituency NA-76 (Gujranwala-III) in the 1990 Pakistani general election. He obtained 67,697 votes and defeated a candidate of PPP. He remained Federal Minister for Local Government and Rural Development in Nawaz Sharif's 1st Cabinet from 1990-93.

He was re-elected to the National Assembly as a candidate of Pakistan Muslim League (N) (PML-N) from Constituency NA-76 (Gujranwala-III) in the 1993 Pakistani general election. He received 64,769 votes and defeated a candidate of PPP.

He was re-elected to the National Assembly as a candidate of PML-N from Constituency NA-76 (Gujranwala-III) in the 1997 Pakistani general election. He received 64,108 votes and defeated a candidate of PPP.
