= Usman Ibrahim =

Pakistani politician (born 1939)

- عثمان ابراہیم

Member of the National Assembly of Pakistan
- In office 15 August 2018 – 10 August 2023
- Constituency: NA-82 (Gujranwala-IV)
- In office 17 March 2008 – 31 May 2018
- Constituency: NA-95 (Gujranwala-I)

Federal Minister for Defence Production
- In office 3 May 2018 – 31 May 2018
- President: Mamnoon Hussain
- Prime Minister: Shahid Khaqan Abbasi
- Succeeded by: Hussain Haroon

Minister of State for Human Rights
- In office 10 October 2017 – 3 May 2018
- President: Mamnoon Hussain

Minister of State for Law and Justice
- In office August 2017 – 10 October 2017
- President: Mamnoon Hussain
- Prime Minister: Shahid Khaqan Abbasi

Minister of State for Capital Administration and Development
- In office January 2014 – November 2015
- President: Mamnoon Hussain
- Prime Minister: Nawaz Sharif
- Succeeded by: Tariq Fazal Chaudhry

Minister of State for Housing and Works
- In office June 2013 – January 2014
- President: Mamnoon Hussain
- Prime Minister: Nawaz Sharif

Personal details
- Born: 1 September 1939 (age 87)
- Other political affiliations: PMLN (2018-2023)
- Children: Shahid Usman Ibrahim (son)

Usman Ibrahim (Urdu: عثمان ابراہیم; born 1 September 1939) is a Pakistani politician who had been a member of the National Assembly of Pakistan from August 2018 till August 2023. Previously, he was a member of the National Assembly from March 2008 to May 2018.

He served as Federal Minister for Defence Production, in Abbasi cabinet in May 2018. Previously, he served as Minister of State for Housing and Works from June 2013 to January 2014, as Minister of State for Capital Administration and Development from January 2014 to November 2015, as Minister of State for Law and Justice from August 2017 to October 2017, and as Minister of State for Human Rights from October 2017 to May 2018.

== Early life and education ==
He was born on 1 September 1939.

He graduated from Government College University in Lahore before doing law graduation from Punjab University Law College in Lahore. He did Barrister at Law from Lincoln's Inn.

== Political career ==
He had been a member of the Provincial Assembly of the Punjab from 1985 to 1999, and held the portfolio of Minister of Education of Punjab from 1990 to 1993.

He ran for the seat of the National Assembly of Pakistan as a candidate of Pakistan Muslim League (N) (PML-N) from Constituency NA-95 (Gujranwala-I) in the 2002 Pakistani general election, but was unsuccessful and lost the seat to a candidate of Pakistan Peoples Party.

He was elected to the National Assembly from Constituency NA-95 (Gujranwala-I) as a candidate of PML-N in the 2008 Pakistani general election.

He was re-elected to the National Assembly as a candidate of PML-N from Constituency NA-95 (Gujranwala-I) in the 2013 Pakistani general election.

In June 2013, he was appointed the Minister of State for Housing and Works in the Nawaz Sharif cabinet.

Ibrahim was made the state minister for Capital Administration and Development Division and was replaced by Tariq Fazal Chaudhry in November 2015 due to reason government was not satisfied with the performance of Ibrahim. He continued to serve as state minister without portfolio. He had ceased to hold ministerial office in July 2017 when the federal cabinet was disbanded following the resignation of Prime Minister Nawaz Sharif after Panama Papers case decision.

Following the election of Shahid Khaqan Abbasi as Prime Minister of Pakistan in August 2017, he was inducted into the federal cabinet of Abbasi. He was made the minister of state for law and Justice. In October 2017, he was made Minister of State for Human Rights.

On 3 May 2018, he was elevated as a federal minister and was appointed Federal Minister for Defence Production in the federal cabinet of Prime Minister Shahid Khaqan Abbasi. Upon the dissolution of the National Assembly on the expiration of its term on 31 May 2018, Ibrahim ceased to hold the office as Federal Minister for Defence Production.

He was re-elected to the National Assembly as a candidate of PML-N from Constituency NA-82 (Gujranwala-IV) in the 2018 Pakistani general election.
