= Jamshed Iqbal Cheema =

Pakistani Politician

Special Assistant to the Prime Minister on Food Security
- In office 19 April 2021 – 10 April 2022
- Appointed by: Imran Khan
- President: Arif Alvi
- Prime Minister: Imran Khan

Personal details
- Born: 2 March 1965 (age 61) Lahore, Punjab, Pakistan
- Other political affiliations: PTI (2018-2023)
- Spouse: Musarrat Jamshed
- Children: 2

Jamshed Iqbal Cheema (born 2 March 1965) is a Pakistani politician who served in the Imran Khan cabinet as the Special Assistant to the Prime Minister on Food Security since 19 April 2021 till 10 April 2022.

== Early life ==
He was born on 2 March 1965 in Lahore, Pakistan to a Jat Cheema family.

== Political career ==
On 19 April 2021, he was appointed as Special Assistant to the Prime Minister on Food Security by Imran Khan.

On 25 May 2022, he was arrested by the police in order to stop the party from holding long march in Islamabad.

On 17 July 2022, he was arrested from Lahore for blaming him for his involvement in injuring a PML-N activist at a polling station in PP-158 as by-polls on 20 constituencies are underway in the Punjab province.
