= Syed Munir Husain =

21st-century Pakistani civil servant

Syed Munir Husain was a Pakistani civil servant and author. He was awarded the Nansen Refugee Award in 1988 for his leadership of the Ministry of States and Frontier Regions as it supported over three million Afghan refugees.

== Career ==
Husain joined the Civil Service Academy, Lahore in 1952. From 1961 to 1964, he worked as the deputy commissioner of Karachi, under the leadership of Nur Khan. In 1965, during the Indo-Pakistani War, he was in charge of West Pakistan's Home Department (Home Office). From 1973 to 1976, he was the chief secretary of Balochistan. From 1983 until 1987, Husain was the Secretary in Pakistan's Ministry of States and Frontier Regions and during that time he expanded educational, job-creation, and veterinary services to help over three million Afghan refugees in Pakistan. It was the largest refugee-support program in the world at the time. From 1987 to 1988, he was the secretary of the Ministry of Information and Broadcasting.

In 1988 in Geneva, Husain was awarded the Nansen Refugee Award. He became the chairman of Agriculture Development Bank of Pakistan in 1988, retiring in 1991.

He published his memoir Surviving the Wreck in 2016. The Express Tribune noted his refusal to give false testimony against Zulfikar Ali Bhutto.

== Publications ==
- Surviving the Wreck: A Civil Servant’s Personal History of Pakistan ILQA Publications, Lahore, 2016 ISBN 978-969-640-030-1, 304pp.
