= Communications Secretary of Pakistan =

Administrative post of the ministry of communications

- Incumbent; Zafar Hassan
- Appointer: Prime Minister of Pakistan
- Website: Ministry of Communications

The communications secretary of Pakistan is the federal secretary for the Ministry of Communications. The position holder is a BPS-22 grade officer, usually belonging to the Pakistan Administrative Service. The secretary heads the Ministry that is the central administrative authority on communications and transport sector in Pakistan. Notable organisations that come under the purview of the communications secretary includes the National Highway Authority (NHA) and the National Highways & Motorway Police (NH&MP). The incumbent federal secretary for communications is Zafar Hassan.

== Federal secretaries ==
Sr.	Secretary name	From	To
1	H. S. Ishaque	18-07-1956	06-06-1962
2	M. H. Zuberi	07-06-1962	27-03-1967
3	A. R. Khan	27-03-1967	09-01-1970
4	Ali Hassan	09-01-1970	20-08-1973
5	K. T. Kidwai	27-08-1973	26-04-1975
6	Shah Nawaz Khan	26-04-1975	06-02-1978
7	Maj Gen. Shafqat Ahmed Syed	16-02-1978	25-07-1979
8	F. K. Bandial	25-07-1979	12-03-1986
9	R. A. Akhund	12-03-1986	11-01-1987
10	K. U. Fafooqi	11-01-1987	07-01-1988
11	H. N. Akhtar	07-01-1988	30-08-1989
12	Badruddin Zahidi	30-08-1989	19-04-1990
13	M. Salman Farooqi	19-04-1990	26-07-1993
14	Aitizazuddin Ahmed	26-07-1993	27-12-1994
15	Muhammad Sher Khan	28-12-1984	10-11-1996
16	Inamul Haque	10-11-1998	19-03-1998
17	Dr. Muhammad Akram Sheikh	20-03-1998	10-05-2000
18	Nazar Mohammad Shaikh	14-07-2000	31-03-2001
19	Iftikhar Rashid	12-04-2001	07-02-2005
20	Tariq Mahmud	10-02-2005	12-11-2007
21	Sajid Hussain Chattha	12-11-2007	05-07-2008
22	Sharif Ahmed	11-10-2008	31-12-2010
23	Anwar Ahmad Khan	01-01-2011	04-04-2013
24	Muhammad Arshad Bhatti	04-04-2013	14-02-2014
25	Babar Yaqoob Fateh Muhammad	01-07-2014	05-11-2014
26	Shahid Ashraf Tarar	05-11-2014	01-03-2016
27	Shahid Ashraf Tarar	01-03-2016	26-12-2016
28	Khalid Masood Chaudhary	26-12-2017	17-07-2017
29	Muhammad Siddique Memon	17-07-2017	18-12-2017
30	Furqan Bahadur Khan	19-12-2017	30-08-2018
31	Shoaib Ahmad Siddiqui	31-08-2018	19-07-2019
32	Jawwad Rafique Malik	19-07-2019	24-04-2020
33	Mohammad Khurram Agha	09-05-2022	02-11-2023
34	Asif Nawaz	03-11-2023	

== See also ==
- Government of Pakistan
- Federal Secretary
- Maritime Secretary of Pakistan
- Cabinet Secretary of Pakistan
- Finance Secretary of Pakistan
- Petroleum Secretary of Pakistan
