= Azra Sabir Khan =

Pakistani politician

Member of the Provincial Assembly of the Punjab
- In office 29 May 2013 – 31 May 2018
- Constituency: Reserved seat for women

Personal details
- Born: 1 January 1945 (age 81) Lahore
- Party: Pakistan Muslim League (N)
- Relations: Ghulam Dastgir Khan (brother-in-law); Khurram Dastgir Khan (nephew)
- Children: 8

Azra Sabir Khan (Urdu: عذرا صابر خان; born 1 January 1945) is a Pakistani politician who was a Member of the Provincial Assembly of the Punjab, from May 2013 to May 2018.

== Early life and education ==
She was born on 1 January 1945 in Lahore and is a member of Dastgir family.

She has completed Intermediate level education.

She has 8 children.

== Political career ==
She was elected to the Provincial Assembly of the Punjab as a candidate of Pakistan Muslim League (N) on a reserved seat for women in the 2013 Pakistani general election.
