= Shahbaz Gill =

Pakistani politician

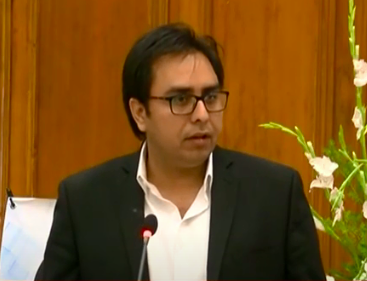

Chief of Staff To Imran Khan
- In office 12 April 2022 – 22 August 2022
- President: Arif Alvi
- Prime Minister: Imran Khan
- Preceded by: Naeemul Haque
- Succeeded by: Shibli Faraz

Imran Khan ministry Special Assistant to the Prime Minister
- In office 13 May 2020 – 3 April 2022

Spokesperson of the Government of Punjab, Pakistan
- In office 2018–2019
- Governor: Chaudhry Sarwar
- Chief Minister: Usman Buzdar
- Succeeded by: Aun Chaudhry

Personal details
- Born: Faisalabad, Punjab, Pakistan
- Party: PTI (2018-present)
- Education: University of Malaya (PhD)

Muhammad Shahbaz Shabbir Gill (Urdu: محمد شہبازشبیرگل), commonly known as Shahbaz Gill (Urdu: شہباز گل), is a Pakistani-American academic, lecturer, politician, former provincial spokesperson to the Government of Punjab, Pakistan, and former Special Assistant to the Prime Minister of Pakistan to Imran Khan. He was a member of the Imran Khan cabinet from 13 May to 3 April 2022. Currently he is the Chief of Staff of former Prime Minister Imran Khan following Khan's removal from office in April 2022.

== Early life and education ==
Gill was born into a Punjabi Jat family in Faisalabad. He received his early education at government schools in Punjab. He earned a PhD in Leadership and Management from the University of Malaya, Malaysia, in 2007. In 2011, he completed postdoctoral research in the same field at the University of Illinois at Urbana-Champaign.

== Academic career ==
Gill has been an assistant professor of business administration at International Islamic University, Islamabad. He was also an assistant professor of business administration at the University of Illinois Urbana-Champaign. He has also been part of the academic staff in countries like Austria and Greece.

== Political career ==
Gill was appointed as a spokesperson for the Chief Minister of Punjab, Pakistan, Usman Buzdar in 2018. In March 2019, Buzdar appointed him to inspect the government institutions and offices on his behalf. He resigned from the post of spokesperson on 13 September 2019.

=== 2022 arrest ===
On 9 August 2022, Gill was arrested on charges of sedition for allegedly trying to incite Pakistani army officers to mutiny. Gill was reportedly "dragged out of his vehicle" before being taken into custody. Gill was arrested for statements he made on ARY News on 8 August about alleged rifts within Pakistan's military over Imran Khan's ouster from office during the no-confidence motion in April 2022.

Gill testified in court that he had been on a hunger strike for four days and was not allowed to change his clothes and take a bath. Shahbaz's request for judicial remand was denied and police granted his requested two-day physical remand. While in custody, he and his party, Pakistan Tehreek-e-Insaf, claimed that he was sexually assaulted. However, in a written statement submitted before the court, Gill stated that he hadn't been sexually assaulted by the police while in detention, though he still said that he was subjected to torture by investigators. Lawyers for Gill submitted a medical report by doctors of Central Jail Rawalpindi in which they declared that Gill was tortured.

On 15 September 2022, Gill was released from Central Jail Rawalpindi on bail.

== Writings ==
Gill's academic work primarily focuses on management, leadership, and public policy. Notable publications include Blasphemy: A Hammer on Consumer Purchase Intentions and Brand Loyalty in Pakistan. This study examines the impact of blasphemy allegations on consumer behavior and brand loyalty within the Pakistani market.

In addition to his academic work, Gill has authored opinion pieces in Pakistani media. His columns in The Nation newspaper cover various topics, including governance, economic policy, and societal issues.
