= NA-80 Gujranwala-IV =

Constituency of the National Assembly of Pakistan

- Constituency for the National Assembly of Pakistan
- Region: Gujranwala City (Western Part) of Gujranwala District
- Electorate: 601,197

Current constituency
- Party: Pakistan Muslim League (N)
- Member: Shahid Usman Ibrahim
- Created from: NA-96 Gujranwala-II

NA-80 Gujranwala-IV (این اے-80، گجرانوالہ-4) is a constituency for the National Assembly of Pakistan.

== Members of Parliament ==
=== 2018–2023: NA-82 Gujranwala-IV ===
Election	Member	Party
2018	Usman Ibrahim	PML (N)

=== 2024–present: NA-80 Gujranwala-IV ===
Election	Member	Party
2024	Shahid Usman Ibrahim	PML (N)

== Election 2002 ==
General elections were held on 10 October 2002. Qazi Hamidullah Khan of Muttahida Majlis-e-Amal won by 39,181 votes.

General election 2002: NA-96 Gujranwala-II
Party	Candidate	Votes	%	±%
MMA	Qazi Hameed Ullah Khan	39,181	43.75	
PPP	Khawaja Muhammad Saleh	24,434	27.29	
PML(N)	Khurram Dastgir Khan	20,306	22.68	
MMA	Robina Saleem	4,037	4.51	
Others	Others (five candidates)	1,590	1.77	
Turnout		91,693	36.93	
Total valid votes		89,548	97.66	
Rejected ballots		2,145	2.34	
Majority		14,747	16.46	
Registered electors		248,268		

== Election 2008 ==
General elections were held on 18 February 2008. Khurram Dastgir Khan of PML-N won by 61,972 votes.

General election 2008: NA-96 Gujranwala-II
Party	Candidate	Votes	%	±%
PML(N)	Khurram Dastgir	61,972	61.74	
PPP	Khawaja Muhammad Saleh	32,898	32.78	
MMA	Qazi Hamidullah Khan	2,600	2.59	
Others	Others (eleven candidates)	2,903	2.89	
Turnout		102,551	29.72	
Total valid votes		100,373	97.88	
Rejected ballots		2,178	2.12	
Majority		29,074	28.96	
Registered electors		343,090		
PML(N) gain from MMA				

== Election 2013 ==
General elections were held on 11 May 2013. Khurram Dastgir Khan of PML-N won by 105,182 votes and became a member of the National Assembly.

General election 2013: NA-96 Gujranwala-II
Party	Candidate	Votes	%	±%
PML(N)	Khurram Dastgir	105,182	67.88	
PTI	S. A. Hameed	30,097	19.42	
PPP	Ch. Muhammad Saeed Gujar	13,667	8.82	
Others	Others (eighteen candidates)	6,002	3.88	
Turnout		157,945	52.03	
Total valid votes		154,948	98.10	
Rejected ballots		2,997	1.90	
Majority		75,085	48.46	
Registered electors		303,568		
PML(N) hold				

== Election 2018 ==
General elections were held on 25 July 2018.

General election 2018: NA-82 (Gujranwala-IV)
Party	Candidate	Votes	%	±%
PML(N)	Usman Ibrahim	117,520	50.90	
PTI	Ali Ashraf Mughal	67,400	29.19	
Others	Others (seventeen candidates)	39,750	17.22	
Turnout		230,891	52.26	
Rejected ballots		6,221	2.69	
Majority		50,120	21.71	
Registered electors		441,801		
PML(N) hold		Swing	N/A	

== Election 2024 ==
General elections were held on 8 February 2024. Shahid Usman Ibrahim, son of Pakistani politician Usman Ibrahim from PML-N, won by 98,206 votes and became a member of the National Assembly of Pakistan.

General election 2024: NA-80 Gujranwala-IV
Party	Candidate	Votes	%	±%
PML(N)	Shahid Usman Ibrahim	98,206	41.92	▼8.98
PTI	Lala Asad Ullah (Note: Filed nomination papers as PTI candidate but ECP allowed him to run as an Independent)	94,895	40.51	▲11.32
TLP	Muhammad Rafiq	18,126	7.74	▲6.04
Others	Others (thirty-one candidates)	23,028	9.83	
Turnout		239,527	39.84	▼12.42
Total valid votes		234,255	97.80	
Rejected ballots		5,272	2.20	
Majority		3,311	1.41	▼20.30
Registered electors		601,197		
PML(N) hold		Swing	N/A	

== See also ==
- NA-79 Gujranwala-III
- NA-81 Gujranwala-V
