= Ayub Afridi (politician) =

Pakistani politician

Advisor to Prime Minister on Overseas Pakistanis
- In office 23 November 2021 – 10 April 2022
- President: Arif Alvi
- Prime Minister: Imran Khan

Member of the Senate of Pakistan
- In office 12 March 2018 – 23 November 2021

Personal details
- Party: PTI (2018-present)
- Relations: Manzoor Afridi (cousin); Javed Afridi (nephew)

Muhammad Ayub Afridi is a Pakistani politician who had been a Member of the Senate of Pakistan from March 2018 to December 2021.

== Political career ==
Afridi was elected to the Senate of Pakistan as a candidate of Pakistan Tehreek-e-Insaf on general seat from Khyber Pakhtunkhwa in the 2018 Pakistani Senate election. He took oath as Senator on 12 March 2018.

On 23 November 2021, he resigned from his seat as senator and was appointed as Advisor to Prime Minister on Overseas Pakistanis.
