= Pakistan Navy (Amendment) Act, 2020 =

Law in Pakistan

Pakistan Navy (Amendment) Act, 2020 that amends the Pakistan Navy Act. It provides a measure to President of Pakistan acting on advice of Prime Minister of Pakistan to extend the tenure of Chief of Naval Staff (CONS) by three years. The amendment also bars the act of the extension of tenure from being challenged in any court. The act sets an upper age limit of 64 years for CONS.
