= Pakistan Air Force (Amendment) Act, 2020 =

Pakistani law

Pakistan Air Force (Amendment) Act, 2020 amends the Pakistan Air Force Act, 1953. It provides a measure to President of Pakistan acting on advice of Prime Minister of Pakistan to extend the tenure of Chief of Air Staff (COAS) by three years. The amendment also bars the act of the extension of tenure from being challenged in any court. The Act sets an upper age limit of 64 years for COAS.
