= Amir-ul-Mulk Mengal =

Pakistani jurist (born 1945)

- امیر الملک مینگل

Chief Justice of Balochistan High Court
- In office 17 November 1996 – 21 April 1999
- Preceded by: Munawar Ahmed Mirza
- Succeeded by: Iftikhar Muhammad Chaudhry

16th Governor of Balochistan
- In office 25 October 1999 – 29 January 2003
- Chief Minister: Jam Mohammad Yousaf
- Preceded by: Syed Fazal Agha
- Succeeded by: Abdul Qadir Baloch

Personal details
- Born: 4 March 1945 (age 81) Nushki, British India
- Education: University of Karachi

Justice Amir-ul-Mulk Mengal (Urdu: امیر الملک مینگل; born 3 April 1945 in Nushki, Balochistan) is a Pakistani jurist. Mengal served from 1996 to 1999 as Chief Justice of the Balochistan High Court. He was from October 1999 till January 2003 the Governor of Balochistan.

== Early life and education ==
Mengal got his early education from Government High School Noshki. Later he did his M.A. in political science from the University of Karachi and L.L.B from Islamia Law College Karachi, in 1968.

== Career ==
Mengal joined as an Advocate of Subordinate Courts in 1969, enrolled as an Advocate of the erstwhile Sindh and Balochistan High Court in 1972, and was elected as General Secretary of the Balochistan Bar Association the same year. He was unanimously elected as President of the Balochistan Bar Association, a position he held from 1979 to 1983. He was appointed as Advocate General of Balochistan in 1985 and then elevated as a Judge of the High Court of Balochistan in 1986. He resumed as Chief Justice of the High Court of Balochistan from 1996 to 1999. During the course of his career in the judiciary, he also became, in 1990, a member of the Election Commission of Pakistan, Chairman of the Provincial Provincial Zakat Council Balochistan, and Chairman of the Balochistan Service Tribunal.

Mengal also served as Chancellor of Balochistan University of Information Technology. He is the author of three books, two of them poetry in brahvi, his mother tongue. Mengal wrote "Dastur-ul-Amal, Deewani Kalat" a book on law.

In 2008, Mengal received the second highest national award Hilal-e-Imtiaz for his services in the public sector.

Political offices
Preceded by Imran Ullah Khan	Governor of Balochistan; 1997	Succeeded by Miangul Aurangzeb
Preceded by Syed Fazal Agha	Governor of Balochistan; 1999 – 2003	Succeeded by Abdul Qadir Baloch
