= Shujaat Azeem =

Pakistani advisor

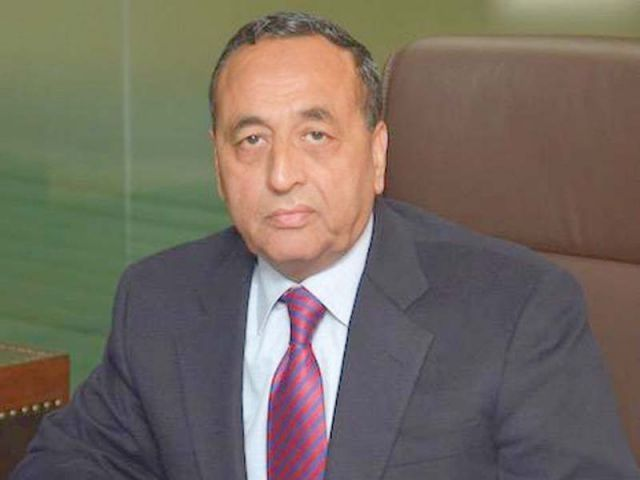
- Born: November 9, 1951 (age 75); Punjab, Pakistan
- Education: Peshawar University (B.S.)

Shujaat Azeem (born November 9, 1951) is a former special assistant and advisor on aviation to prime minister of Pakistan Mian Muhammad Nawaz Sharif, from 2013 to 2016.

He is a Pakistani businessman, aviation expert and a pilot.

== Education ==
Azeem has a Bachelor of Sciences in Avionics from Peshawar University.

== Career ==
Shujaat Azeem started his career in aviation as a Pakistan Air Force general duty pilot. He joined the service in 1968 and continued to serve until 1979. He was dismissed from the service after a court martial. He then proceeded to the United States, where he obtained his commercial pilot's license and certifications.

=== Pilot - Prime Minister of Lebanon ===
Azeem entered the service of Rafic Hariri, Prime Minister of Lebanon, as a pilot in 1980, serving for 17 years. On his return to Pakistan in 1997, he continued working in the aviation sector, moving into aviation management.

=== Business ventures ===
He has built several successful national and international multimillion-dollar businesses in his career in Pakistan – Apollo Telecom, Unicus Business Services, Royal Airport Services and Sukh Chayne Gardens. In 1992, Shujaat Azeem founded Apollo Telecom (Pvt.) Ltd., one of Pakistan's leading technology solution providers. During his time in Apollo, Azeem held the positions of CEO and President. In 1994, his company was the technology provider to Pakistan Telecommunication Company Limited (PTCL) to establish the first Public Data Network for the first full service Internet Service Provider (ISP) in Pakistan, which went live in 1995. In 1999, he established Unicus Business Services (Pvt.) Ltd. and worked there as its CEO. Unicus, in a joint venture won the UFone GSM Contract, establishing the countrywide UFone network infrastructure.

=== Special Assistant/Advisor to the Prime Minister of Pakistan ===
During his tenure as the Advisor and Special Assistant, PIA was able to add fleet of 320 Aircraft, securing of lease of 777 aircraft for long haul flight and ATR fleet for domestic regional connectivity. His efforts led to early completion of Multan Airport, timely revamping on priority of Benazir Bhutto International airport, while work was being done to add bridges to new Islamabad airport, based on his vision of additional flights that will take place by domestic and international airlines. His efforts led to securing spaces at Peshawar, Faisalabad and Quetta International airport and creation of regional/provincial airport with adequate lounge, and passenger facilitation area. Expansion of these airports to support air travel for these areas was indeed a major mile stone initiated by Capt. Azeem and was appreciated by aviation industry and people of Pakistan. Azeem led the introduction of technology in aviation management by upgrading the Radio Navigation Aids and Instrument landing system, replacing passenger aero-bridges in Karachi, installing Integrated Security Systems and installation of Equipment/ Scanners at Karachi, Lahore & Islamabad International Airports. He also introduced 360 Degree Aerodrome Simulators for training centers and invested in human capital development. He is responsible for the development of the Pakistan National Aviation Policy 2015, focusing on the reform and development of the aviation sector of Pakistan. Pakistan airspace was being used by all airlines and despite lapse of many years, the revenue was stagnant. He revised the overflight rates and it ushed the revenue of PCAA manifold, making it one of the most profitable organization of Pakistan.

=== Timeline ===
- 1968–1979: PAF General Duty Pilot
- 1980–1997: Pilot of Rafic Hariri
- 1997: Chief Executive Officer, Apollo Telecom
- 1999: Chief Executive Officer, Unicus Business Services
- 2005: Chief Executive Officer, Sukh Chayn Gardens
- 2005: Chief Executive Officer, Royal Airport Services
- 2013–2014: Advisor to the Prime Minister of Pakistan, Mohammad Nawaz Sharif, on Aviation
- 2014–2016: Special Assistant to the Prime Minister of Pakistan on Aviation

== Challenges ==
The inherited challenges of PIA were immense and the consistent failures required short term and long term targets. He initiated the core work of route and revenue analysis, along with addition of much need 320, 777 and ATR aircraft to increase revenue. His actions led to recalling of staff from airports that had nil PIA traffic and closing down of loss making stations, recalling of staff to ensure better management. His long term vision was to bring in a private board for both PIA and PCAA to make them growth orientated entities. His vision was appreciated by major lenders of the PIA, who would have earned a seat at board thus empowering them to be the decision makers and improve PIA performance, that impacted positively in stock market and stocks from an historical low of PKR 6 to high of PKR 14, on account of positive market opinion. Despite all odds, the passenger numbers grew with addition of new aircraft in PIA fleet.

== Philanthropy ==
Shujaat Azeem, funds and operates many different philanthropic initiatives in the education, shelter, poverty alleviation, and food security sectors. His endeavours aim to bring about sustainable change for the betterment of the people. In 2011, he established a model village in Rajanpur, Punjab consisting of 270 houses and provided vocational and other allied facilities to the residents of the village. He also runs a free education institution, in Pakistan's capital city, Islamabad, which provides free quality primary and secondary education to students. Azeem, also runs food security programs and has established a sustenance fund for widows

== Sukh Chayn Gardens ==
In 2004 Azeem established a state-of-the-art housing scheme in Lahore, Pakistan, Sukh Chayn Gardens (Pvt.) Ltd. The scheme is built on canal road a famous landmark of the city. The scheme was established to provide quality housing and superior services and infrastructure to the residents of this historical city. Azeem built the colony enabled with technology like sensor based garbage collection, addressed security needs by introducing constant patrols by guards and dogs, and dedicated 50% of the area as green-areas to preserve and enrich the environment. The colony is also host to a replica of The Blue Mosque Istanbul. This one of a kind Mosque in Pakistan was constructed by Turkish artisans and inaugurated jointly by the Prime Ministers of Pakistan and China.
