= Khurram Dastgir =

Pakistani politician (born 1970)

Khurram Dastgir Khan
- خرم دستگیر خان
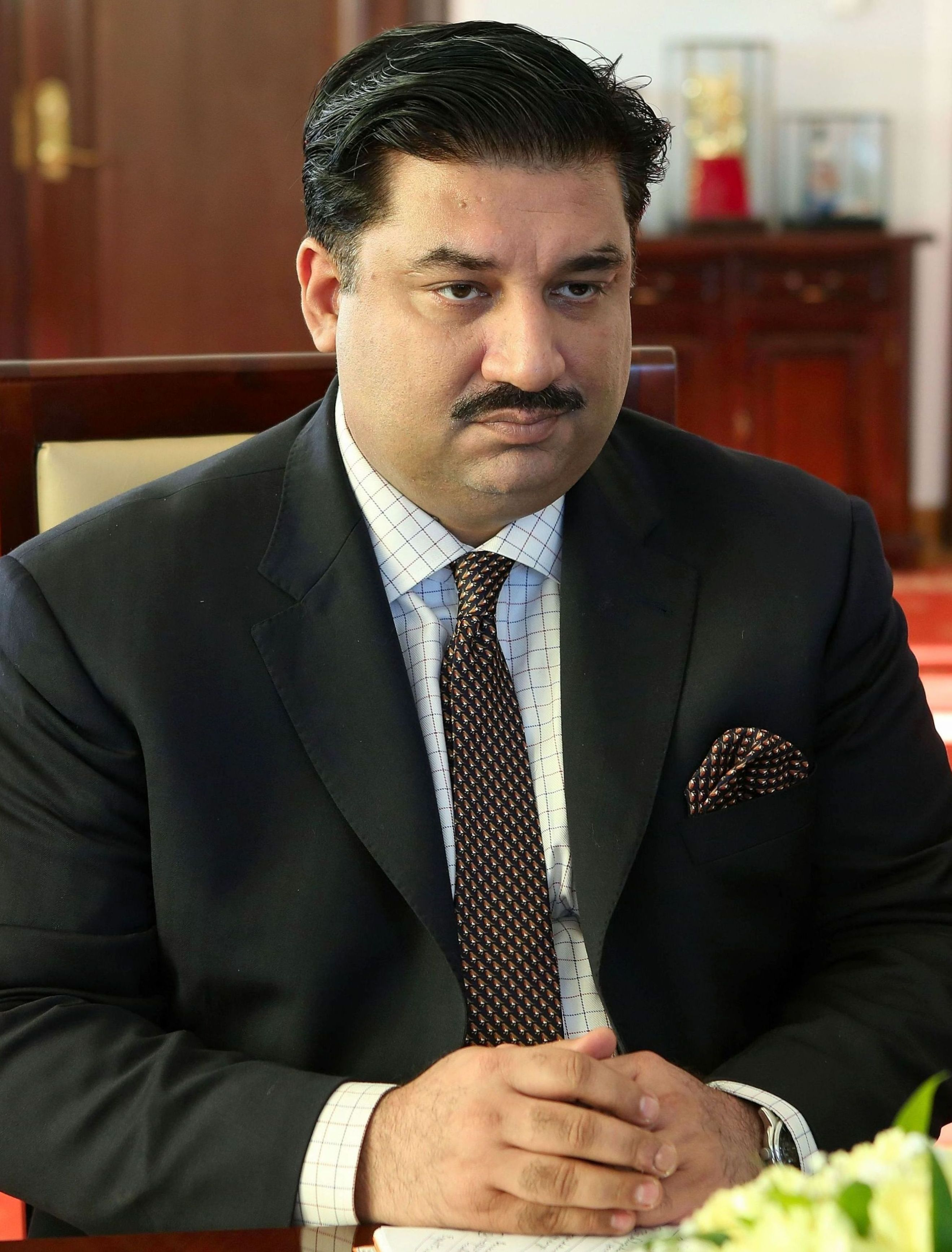

Federal Minister of Energy
- In office 19 April 2022 – 10 August 2023
- President: Arif Alvi
- Prime Minister: Shehbaz Sharif
- Preceded by: Hammad Azhar

Minister of Foreign Affairs
- In office 11 May 2018 – 31 May 2018
- President: Mamnoon Hussain
- Prime Minister: Shahid Khaqan Abbasi
- Preceded by: Khawaja Muhammad Asif
- Succeeded by: Hussain Haroon

Minister of Defence
- In office 4 August 2017 – 31 May 2018
- President: Mamnoon Hussain
- Prime Minister: Shahid Khaqan Abbasi
- Preceded by: Khawaja Muhammad Asif
- Succeeded by: Hussain Haroon

Minister of Commerce
- In office 17 January 2014 – 28 July 2017
- President: Mamnoon Hussain
- Prime Minister: Nawaz Sharif
- Preceded by: Mubashir Hassan
- Succeeded by: Muhammad Pervaiz Malik
Parliamentary Positions
Member of the National Assembly of Pakistan
In office 17 March 2008 – 10 August 2023
Constituency	NA-96 (Gujranwala-II)

Personal details
- Born: 3 August 1970 (age 56) Gujranwala, Punjab, Pakistan
- Party: PMLN (2002-present)
- Relations: Azra Sabir Khan (aunt)
- Parent: Ghulam Dastgir Khan (father)
- Education: California Institute of Technology (BSc); Bowdoin College (BA)

Khurram Dastgir Khan (Punjabi, Urdu: خرم دستگیر خان; born 3 August 1970) is a Pakistani politician who had been a member of the National Assembly of Pakistan from August 2018 till August 2023. Previously, he was a member of the National Assembly of Pakistan from 2008 to 2013, and again from 2013 to 2018.

He served as Chairman of Standing Committee of the National Assembly on Commerce from 2008–13. He served as Federal Minister for Commerce from 2014–17 in the Cabinet of Nawaz Sharif. He served as Federal Minister for Defence from 2017–18 and Federal Minister for Foreign Affairs from 11 May 2018 – 31 May 2018 in the cabinet of Shahid Khaqan Abbasi. He also served as Federal Minister for Energy in the cabinet of Shehbaz Sharif from 2022–23.

Khan studied engineering from the California Institute of Technology and economics at Bowdoin College.

Beyond his political career, he has also been involved in the family business, has served as the Vice President of Punjab Squash Association for 1998–2002 and has managed District Red Crescent, Gujranwala Club and Jinnah Memorial Library.

== Early life and education ==
Khan was born on 3 August 1970 in Gujranwala, Punjab, Pakistan.

Khan studied at the St. Joseph's High School in Gujranwala and Cadet College, Hasan Abdal.

Khan attended the Bowdoin College in Brunswick, Maine from where he holds a degree in Economics and was trained as an electrical engineer at the California Institute of Technology.

== Political career ==
In 1999, he was serving as Special Assistant to then Prime Minister of Pakistan Nawaz Sharif until his tenure was terminated during the 1999 Pakistani coup d'état staged by Pervez Musharraf.

He ran for the seat of National Assembly of Pakistan from Gujranwala constituency as a candidate of PML (N) in the 2002 Pakistani general elections but was unsuccessful. Reportedly, he was booked for terrorist activities; for beating up two PPP activists at a polling station and for getting a provocative pamphlet published about a rival candidate in separate cases.

From 2006 to 2009, he worked on building his reputation in the PML-N where he eventually became party's central deputy secretary information.

He was elected to the National Assembly for the first time as a candidate of PML(N) in the 2008 Pakistani general election. In October 2008, he was elected as Chairman of the Standing Committee of National Assembly on Commerce.

He was re-elected to the National Assembly for the second time as a candidate of PML (N) in the 2013 Pakistani general election. Upon PML-N victory in the 2013 general election, Khan was first appointed as Minister of State for Science and Technology. Later, he was made Minister of State for Privatisation as well Chairman of the Privatisation Commission of Pakistan. In December 2013, he was appointed as the Minister of State for Commerce.

In January 2014, he was elevated to the rank of federal minister and was appointed as the Minister for Commerce for the first time. He had ceased to hold ministerial office in July 2017 when the federal cabinet was disbanded following the disqualification of Prime Minister Nawaz Sharif after Panama Papers case decision.

Following the election of Shahid Khaqan Abbasi as Prime Minister of Pakistan, Khan was inducted into the federal cabinet of Abbasi and was appointed Minister for Defence for the first time. In May 2018, he was given the additional portfolio of Minister for Foreign Affairs. Upon the dissolution of the National Assembly on the expiration of its term on 31 May 2018, Khan ceased to hold the office as Federal Minister for Foreign Affairs and Federal Minister for Defence.

He was re-elected to the National Assembly as a candidate of PML-N from Constituency NA-81 (Gujranwala-III) in the 2018 Pakistani general election.

== Writings ==
Khan published his book Gujranwala: At the Dawn of a New Millennium in 1999, and since 2000 he has also written in many English-language newspapers of the country, including book reviews for Dawn.

Political offices
Preceded by	Minister of State for Science and Technology; 2013—2013	Succeeded by
Preceded by	Chairman of the Privatisation Commission; 2013—2013	Succeeded by
Preceded by	Minister of State for Privatisation; 2013—2013	Succeeded by
Preceded by	Minister of State for Commerce; 2013—2014	Succeeded by
Preceded by	Minister for Commerce; 2014—2017	Succeeded by
Preceded by	Minister for Defence; 2017—2018	Succeeded by
