= Ministry of States and Frontier Regions (Pakistan) =

Government ministry of Pakistan

- وزارتِ ریاستی و سرحدی امور

Agency overview
- Formed: 1947
- Jurisdiction: Pakistan
- Headquarters: Islamabad, Islamabad Capital Territory
- Minister responsible: Amir Muqam
- Agency executive: Ahsan Iqbal, Secretary
- Website: www.safron.gov.pk

The Ministry of States and Frontier Regions (Urdu: وزارتِ ریاستی و سرحدی امور, wazarat-e- reyasti o sarhadi umoor; abbreviated as SAFRON) was a federal ministry in Pakistan.

The main responsibilities of the ministry were the administrative affairs and development activities in the tribal areas of Pakistan, including Frontier Regions of Pakistan and Federally Administered Tribal Areas (FATA).

It has been merged into the Ministry of Kashmir Affairs and Gilgit-Baltistan as of 2025.

== Commissionerate for Afghan Refugees ==
In 1980, the Commissionerate for Afghan Refugees was established in Islamabad under SAFRON. This was in response to the influx of refugees from Afghanistan to Pakistan from 1979, due to the Soviet invasion and factional fighting in Afghanistan.

The main functions of Commissionerate are to manage Afghan refugees and support the provision of basic facilities for the welfare of Afghan refugees, coordinating activities with federal and provincial government, NGOs, and international agencies specially UNHCR.

There is a Commissionerate for Afghan Refugees in each province except Sindh.

== Cadet College Razmak ==
Cadet College Razmak, North Waziristan Agency is an autonomous body of the ministry.

== List of ministers ==
Name	Entered office	Left office
Iskander Mirza	23 October 1954	7 August 1955
Shaukatullah Khan	11 February 2011	11 February 2012
Chaudhry Muhammad Barjees Tahir	13 June 2012	11 February 2013
Najmuddin Khan	N/A	N/A
Abdul Qadeer Baloch	7 June 2013	28 July 2017
Abdul Qadir Baloch	4 August 2017	31 May 2018
Roshan Khursheed Bharucha	5 June 2018	18 August 2018
Tariq Bashir Cheema (Federal Minister)	20 August 2018	6 September 2018
Shehryar Khan Afridi (Minister of State)	18 April 2019	25 September 2020
Sahabzada Muhammad Mehboob Sultan (Federal Minister)	20 November 2019	09 April 2022
Muhammad Talha Mahmood (Federal Minister)	19 April 2022	N/A
Amir Muqam	29 March 2024	Till date

== See also ==
- Frontier Regions of Pakistan
- Federally Administered Tribal Areas
- Ministry of Kashmir Affairs & Gilgit Baltistan
- Syed Munir Husain, secretary of the Ministry, 1983 to 1987
