= Ministry of Communications (Pakistan) =

Ministry of the Government of Pakistan

- وزارت مواصلات
- Seal of Government of Pakistan

Agency overview
- Formed: 14 August 1947; 79 years ago
- Jurisdiction: Government of Pakistan
- Headquarters: Red Zone, Islamabad, ICT, Pakistan; 33°44′16.28″N 73°05′44.00″E
- Minister responsible: Aleem Khan, Federal Minister of Communications
- Agency executive: Zafar Hassan, Pakistan Secretary of Communications
- Website: Official Website

The Ministry of Communications (Urdu: وزارت مواصلات; reporting name: MoCom), is a Cabinet-level ministry of the Pakistani Government responsible for analysing, formulating and implementing central policy on communications and transportation. It is one of the oldest ministries, created on 14 August 1947. The Ministry of Communications has jurisdiction over telegraph and telephone communications as well as public radio, technical means of radio and television broadcasting and the distribution of periodicals. The Ministry and its political executive, the Communications Minister, are headquartered in the Cabinet Secretariat, Islamabad Capital Venue. The Communications Minister is a public appointee who must be a member of Parliament.

== History ==
When the Ministry was created in 1947, Sardar Abdur Rab Nishtar was appointed the first Communications Minister. The Communications Ministry was merged in 1971–72 with the Ministry of Hajj. In 1974 the Ministry of Hajj again became a separate Ministry, and the new Ministry of Communications and Railways was formed. Railways broke off in later years, became a Division of the Communications Ministry from 2002–03 and then separated again. In 2004 the Ports and Shipping Wing became an independent Division of the Ministry.

== Functions ==
The Communications Ministry performs a wide array of functions. These include promoting international competitiveness of exports, integrating remote areas of the country into the national economy, ensuring safe and smooth travel on national roads, providing an efficient, reliable and speedy postal service comparable to private alternatives, researching road engineering, building and management, and expanding national road networks. The Ministry also works to increase the standard of its own operations through prioritising development projects and operational activities according to national needs, providing support to the economy, improving project monitoring and implementation, improving the quality of human resources, using incentives and discipline to enhance good governance, and improving values and ethics.

== Organisation ==
=== National Highway Authority ===
The National Highway Authority is responsible for building and maintaining highways and motorways in Pakistan. The objective of the NHA is to "plan, promote and organize programmes for construction, development, operation, repairs & maintenance of National Highways, Motorways & strategic roads.

=== National Highways & Motorway Police ===
National Highways & Motorway Police (NH&MP) is a police force in Pakistan that is responsible for enforcement of traffic and safety laws, security and recovery on Pakistan's National Highways and Motorway network.

=== National Transport Research Centre ===
National Transport Research Centre (NTRC) was established in June 1974 in the Planning and Development Division as one of its Technical Sections to provide much-needed research and development (R&D) support for planning and appraisal of transport sector projects/plans in a coordinated and cost-effective manner. NTRC was transferred as such to the Communications Division in November 1992. It is effectively functioning as an R&D Wing of the Ministry of Communications.

=== Construction Machinery Training Institute ===
Construction Machinery Training Centre (CMTC) was established in May 1986 with the assistance of the Government of Japan through Japan International Cooperation Agency (JICA). The centre, having successfully met the aims and objectives, was upgraded in 1992 and renamed as Construction Machinery Training Institute.

== Postal Division ==
=== Pakistan Post ===
Pakistan Post is a state enterprise dedicated to providing a wide range of postal products and public services in Pakistan. It is the largest postal service in the country.

=== Pakistan Post Foundation ===
Pakistan Post Foundation (PPF) was established in 1990 as a trust to generate resources and promote the social well-being of present and retired postal employees through commercial ventures.

== Allocation of business ==
The Federal Government has allocated the following business to the ministry under Schedule II, Rules of Business 1973:

- National planning, research and international aspects of road and road transport
- National highways and strategic roads, including administration of the National Highway Council and Authority, Central Road Fund and Fund for Roads of National Importance.
- Mechanically propelled vehicles, through the Transport Advisory Council and Urban Road Transport Corporation
- Enemy property
- National Highways & Motorway Police

== List of Communications Ministers of Pakistan ==
Name of Communications Minister	Entered Office	Left Office
G. W. Choudhury	1969	1971
Raja Nadir Pervez	1997	1999
Nisar Ali Khan	31 March 2008	1 July 2008
Arbab Alamgir Khan	4 November 2008	2013
Nawaz Sharif	2013	2017
Hafiz Abdul Kareem	4 August 2017	31 May 2018
Roshan Khursheed Bharucha	7 June 2018	18 August 2018
Imran Khan	18 August 2018	17 December 2018
Murad Saeed	17 December 2018	10 April 2022
Maulana Asad Mehmood	19 April 2022	10 August 2023
Shahid Ashraf Tarar	17 August 2023	4 March 2024
Aleem Khan	11 March 2024	
