= Ministry of Inter Provincial Coordination =

Government ministry of Pakistan

Agency overview
- Formed: 3 November 2008; 15 years ago
- Jurisdiction: Government of Pakistan
- Headquarters: Ministry of Inter-Provincial Co-ordination, Cabinet Block, Islamabad-44030
- Minister responsible: Rana Ahmed Ateeq Anwar, Adviser to the Prime Minister for Inter Provincial Coordination
- Agency executive: Mr. Zahoor Ahmed, Federal Secretary of Inter Provincial Coordination
- Website: Official website

The Ministry of Inter Provincial Coordination (Urdu: وزارت بین الصوبائی رابطہ, abbreviated as MoIPC) is a ministry of the Government of Pakistan. The subsidiary Council of Common Interests or CCI is a constitutional body in Pakistan. The CCI resolves the disputes of power sharing between the federation and its provinces. The ministry is responsible for coordination between the federal and the provincial governments. It aids both the provincial and the federal entities in providing uniformity of approach in formulation of policies that concern both. It is currently headed by Ehsan ur Rehman Mazari as of 21 April 2022.

== Departments and attached bodies ==
- Council of Common Interests
- Inter Provincial Coordination Committee
- Gun and Country Club
- Pakistan Veterinary Medical Council
- Department of Tourist Services
- Federal Land Commission
- National Internship Program
