= Ministry of Human Rights (Pakistan) =

Government ministry of Pakistan

- وزارتِ انسانی حقوق

Agency overview
- Formed: 2016; 10 years ago
- Jurisdiction: Government of Pakistan
- Headquarters: 9th Floor, New Pak Secretariat (Kohsar Block). Sector F-5 Islamabad, Islamabad Capital Territory
- Annual budget: 300 Million Rupees (2018-2019)
- Minister responsible: Azam Nazeer Tarar, Minister for Human Rights and Women Empowerment
- Agency executive: A.D Khowaja (BPS-22), Human Rights Federal Secretary
- Website: www.mohr.gov.pk

The Ministry of Human Rights (Urdu: وزارت انسانی حقوق, abbreviated as MoHR) is a federal government agency in Pakistan. The ministry is headed by Azam Nazeer Tarar, the Minister for Human Rights, while Abdul Khalique Shaikh serves as the Federal Secretary. The historically contentious issue of human rights in Pakistan received an added emphasis from the highest leadership of Pakistan when the ministry was chipped out of the Ministry of Law and Justice on November 3, 2008.

== Recreation of ministry set up originally in 1995 ==
Originally the ministry was created by Prime Minister Benazir Bhutto in 1995/96, but with the dissolution of her government the ministry was downsized. At that time the ministry was set up as a department within the justice ministry. It had then 125 employees and four regional offices. Then, with a limited budget, the ministry worked on a case-by-case basis only seeking help from donor agencies to expand its activity. A prison reform program was instituted in 2000 and also a "fund for women in distress and detention" and a "relief and revolving fund" for victims of human rights violations were set up. According to an assessment by the United States Department of State the ministry was however not perceived as effective by human rights observers which noted specifically that the Pakistani government had failed to take follow-up action on the 1997 report of the Commission of Inquiry for Women.

== 2008 Ministry led by Mumtaz Alam Gillani ==
The government had approved the draft bill for the establishment of an independent National Human Rights Commission of Pakistan (not to be confounded with the already existing NGO Human Rights Commission of Pakistan). Shortly after his appointment minister Alam Gillani had also announced that a task force consisting of journalists, civil society activists and social workers would be formed on district and divisional levels to address human rights violations cases and also that separate courts for human rights would also be established at district levels. Furthermore, the ministry had announced that it is preparing a new law which will form the basis for work to shed light in the fate of potentially thousands of citizens who have gone missing, and according to human rights activists, may have been taken away by security and intelligence services during Pakistan's seven-year war on terror.

== See also ==
- Human rights in Pakistan
- Women in Pakistan
