= Jats of Balochistan =

Ethnic group in southern Pakistan

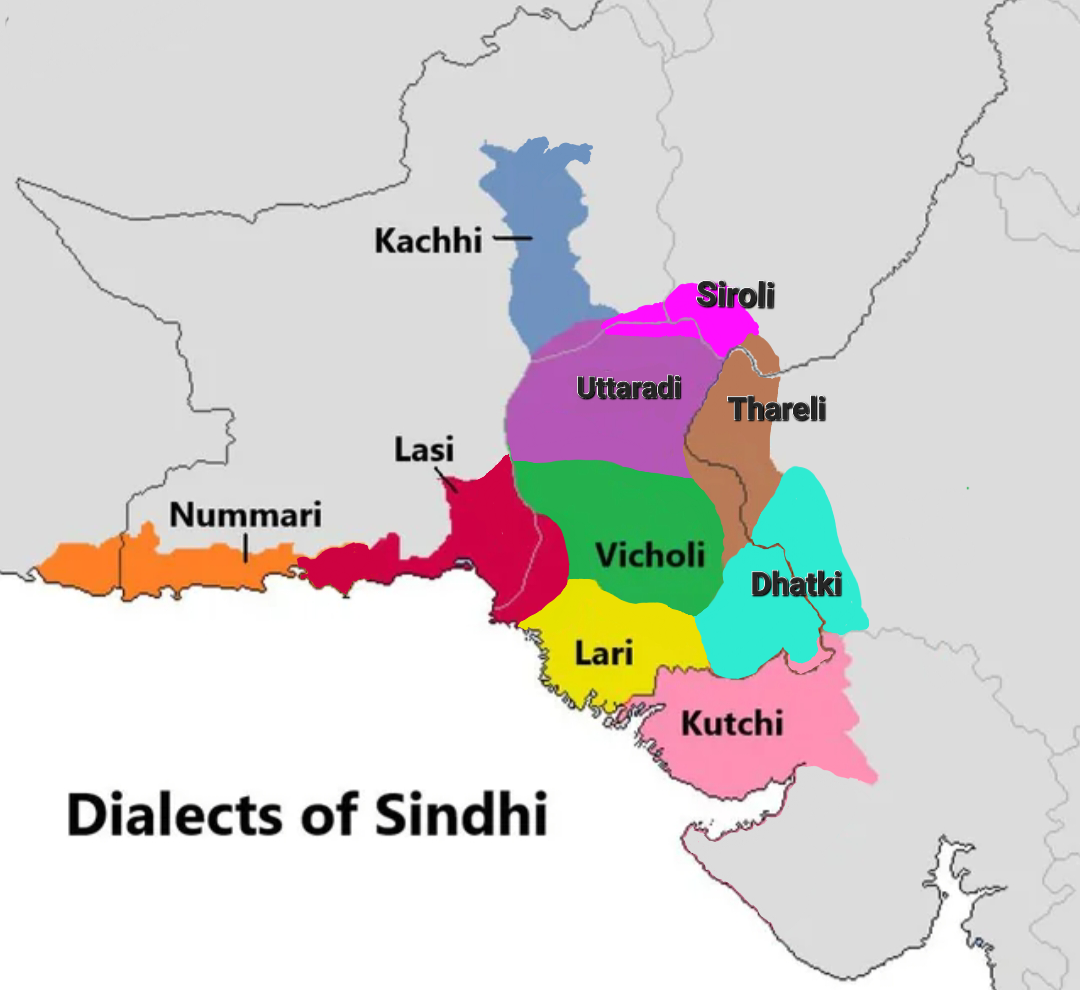
- Map of Sindhi dialects; the Jats of Balochistan live and work in the Lasi, Lari, Kutchi, and Nummari regions

Regions with significant populations
- Balochistan, Sindh, Punjab

Languages
- Balochi, Sindhi, Saraiki and Jadgali

Religion
- Islam

Related ethnic groups
- Baloch people • Sindhi Sammats

The Jats of Balochistan are tribes of Sindhi origin, usually from Lari Sindhi Jats, Jadgals, and Jamotes, found in Pakistani Balochistan, specifically in the Kacchi Plains, Las Bela, and Makran. They are also found in lower Sindh and Kutch. The Makran region was inhabited by Jat people and other indigenous peoples before the Baloch people migrated into the region from modern-day Iran.

They are estimated to be around 10% of the total population of Balochistan, making up the fourth largest ethnic group in the area. Most of these Jats are nomadic pastoralists who specialize in raising camels.

== History ==
In the Arabic literature, the ethnonym of the Jat people was Arabicised into Zuṭṭ. By the time of the Umayyad conquest of Sind in the 8th century, the Arab writers described agglomerations of Jats (known to them as Zuṭṭ) throughout the newly conquered lands of Sind and Makran. Sometimes tribes like the Sāyabija, Andāghar, and Qufs were also considered a part of them. The Jats of Makran, who were dromedary-men, reportedly reared fine-quality camels which were in demand as far as Khurasan; these camels were also presented to Caliph Mu'awiya. Today, despite their origins, Jats of Balochistan are generally seen as Baloch. In the 10th and 11th centuries, many Jats migrated into upper Punjab from Makran and Sind.

The major Jat tribes in Balochistan include:

- Bizenjo
- Dodai
- Gurchani
- Lanjwani
- Mengal
- Sajdi
- Sardarzahi
- Zehri

== See also ==
- Sindhis of Balochistan
- Sindhi Sammat
