= Kulanch =

Sub Tehsil of Pasni

کولانچ سب تحصیل
- Pasni Tehsil
- Kulanch
- Country: Pakistan
- Province: Balochistan
- District: Gwadar District
- Time zone: UTC+5 (PST)
- Number of towns: 4
- Number of Union Councils: 2

Kulanch is a sub-tehsil of Pasni, Gwadar District, Balochistan in Pakistan. People living there are known as Kulanchi. After the Med people, they are known as primitive population of Gwadar. Kulanch is a large cultivable area beginning 50 km east of Gwadar city and ending near Pasni.

Notable towns here are Belar, Nalient, Kallag, and Kappar. The major tribes living here are the Puzzh (Rind), Band, Sangur (Jadgal), Wadela (Mengal), Jadgal, Mullai, Maldar (Bizenjo), and Rekani.
