= Dasht Tehsil (Kech District) =

Dasht Kech
- Tehsil
- Dasht
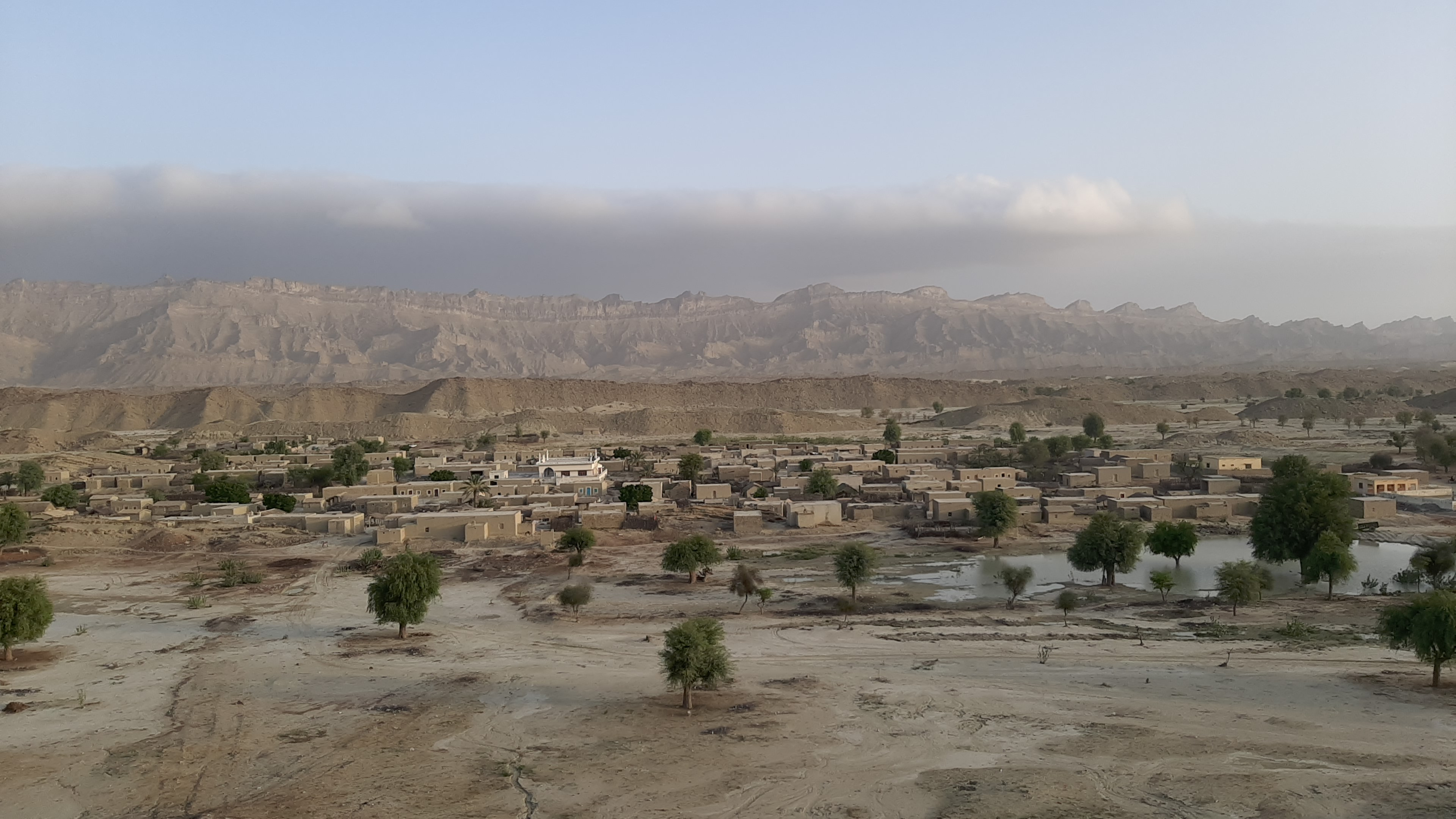
- Shooli, Dasht Tehsil

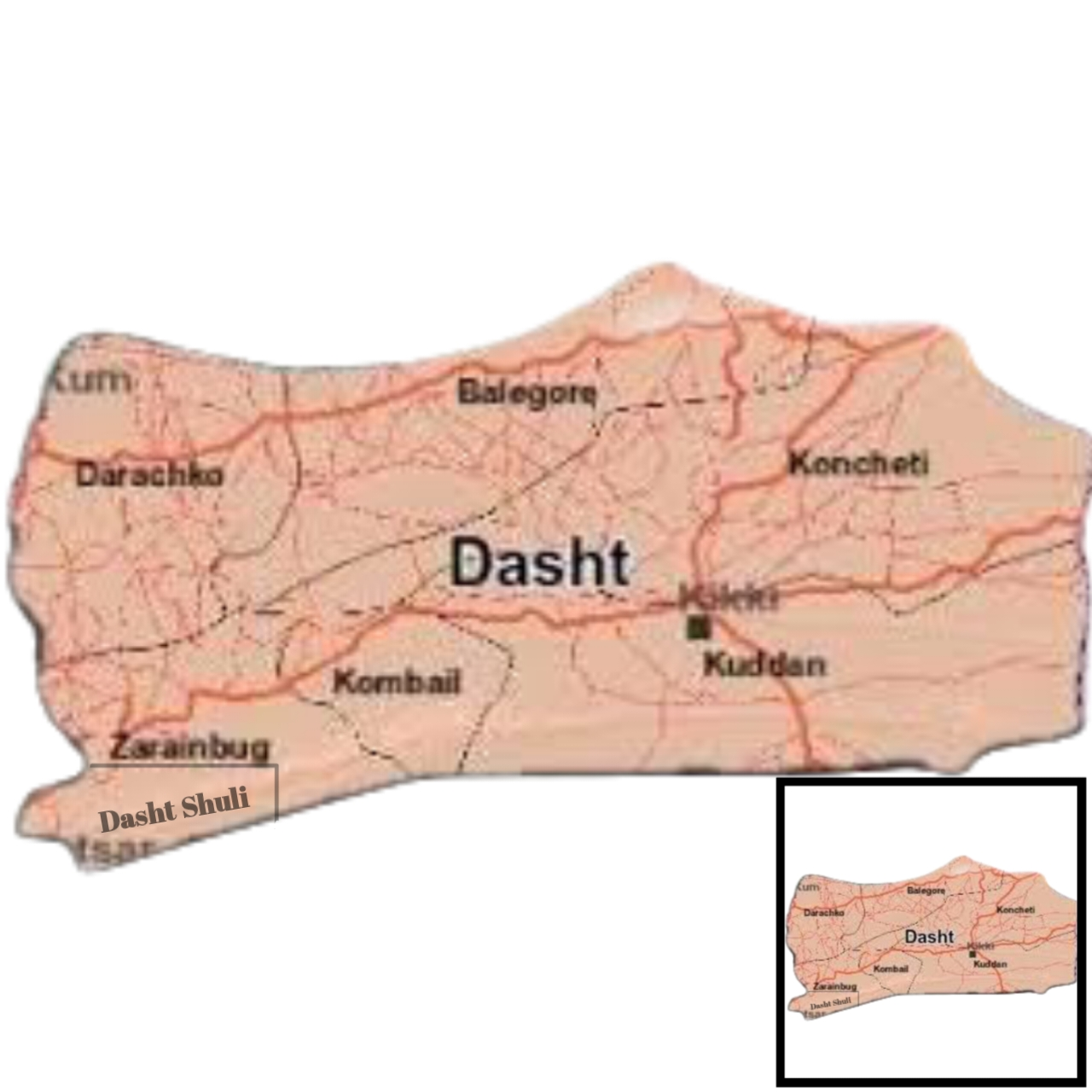
- Map of Dasht Tehsil
- Country: Pakistan
- Province: Balochistan
- Division: Makran
- District: Kech District

Government
  - Assistant Commissioner: Jahanzaib Shahwani

Area
  - Tehsil: 2,486 km^{2} (960 sq mi)

Population (2023)
  - Tehsil: 90,080
  - Density: 36.23/km^{2} (93.85/sq mi)
  - Urban: -
  - Rural: 90,080 (100%)

Literacy (2023)
  - Literacy rate: 37.25%
- Time zone: UTC+05:00 (PST)
- Number of Union Councils: 6

Dasht Tehsil (Urdu: تحصیل دشت کیچ) is a tehsil of Kech District in Makran, Balochistan, Pakistan.

== Geography ==
Dasht Tehsil is located in the south of Kech District. It is bordered by Gwadar District in the south, by Tump Tehsil in the northwest and Turbat Tehsil in the northeast.

== Subdivisions ==
The tehsil is subdivided into six union councils: Balnegore, Darachko, Kombail, Koncheti, Khuddan and Zarain Bug. The headquarters of the tehsil is Khuddan.

Other populated places in the tehsil include Shooli, which is close to Gwadar District.

== Demographics ==
=== Population ===
Historical population
Year	Pop.	±% p.a.
1951	...	—
1961	...	—
1972	...	—
1981	13,203	—
1998	19,560	+2.34%
2017	76,470	+7.44%
2023	90,080	+2.77%
Sources: Pakistan Bureau of Statistics:

According to 2023 census, Tehsils had a population of 90,080 living in 21,083 households. All population lives in rural areas.

As of the 2017 census, the tehsil's population is 76,470 inhabitants.

=== Literacy ===
The overall literacy rate stands at 37.25%. A significant gender gap is also evident, with male literacy at 42.79% and females literacy at just 31.28%. These figures highlight persistent challenges in educational access, particularly for women and girls.

== Personalities ==
Well-known personalities from Dasht Tehsil include Baloch poet Jan Dashti.

== See also ==
- Tehsils in Pakistan
  - Tehsils of Balochistan
- Districts of Pakistan
  - Districts of Balochistan, Pakistan
- Divisions of Pakistan
  - Divisions of Balochistan
