= Jhal Jhao Tehsil =

Pakistani administrative area

Jhal Jhao Tehsil Balochi: تحصیل جھلجاؤ
- Tehsil of Awaran District
- Location within Balochistan, Pakistan Location within Pakistan
- Coordinates: 25°40′N 65°50′E
- Country: Pakistan
- Province: Balochistan
- District: Awaran District
- Headquarters: Gishkaur

Area
  - Tehsil of Awaran District: 6,381 km^{2} (2,464 sq mi)
- Elevation: 347 m (1,138 ft)

Population (2023)
  - Tehsil of Awaran District: 28,132
  - Density: 4.41/km^{2} (11.4/sq mi)
  - Rural: 28,132 (100%)

Literacy
  - Literacy rate: Total: (26.62%); Male: (33.36%); Female: (19.52%)
- Time zone: UTC+5 (PST)
- Number of Union Councils: 2
- Union Councils: Camp Jahoo, Korak
- Main languages: 28,102 (99%) Balochi

Jhal Jhao (Note: Balochi: جھلجاؤ, Urdu: جھلجاؤ, pronounced [d͡ʒʱəlˈd͡ʒɑːʊ]) is an administrative subdivision (tehsil) of Awaran District in southern Balochistan, Pakistan, encompassing an area of approximately 6,381 square kilometres (2,464 sq mi). According to the 2023 national census, the tehsil has a population of 28,132, distributed across 142 rural settlements and 3,990 households. Administratively, it is further divided into two Union Councils.

== Geography ==
Located in the southeastern part of Awaran District, Jhal Jhao lies between the northern edge of the Makran Coastal Range and the southern slopes of the Central Makran Range. The terrain transitions from arid lowlands to rugged hills, with elevations rising to approximately 1,000 metres (3,300 ft). The tehsil is bordered to the north by Korak Jhao, Ornach, and Wadh tehsils; to the west by Gishkore and Awaran tehsils; and to the east by Bela and Lakhra tehsils. It shares both its eastern and southern boundaries with Liari, all three part of Lasbela District.

The Makran Coastal Highway passes through the southern section of the tehsil, serving as a key transportation corridor connecting the eastern and western parts of Liari. Jhal Jhao lies inland, just north of the Miani Hor lagoon, situated along the Arabian Sea coast.

The physical landscape is predominantly hilly and arid, interspersed with seasonal watercourses (nalas) and xerophytic vegetation, including drought-tolerant trees, shrubs, and ephemeral plant species adapted to low precipitation and high temperatures.

== Climate ==
Jhal Jhao, has a subtropical desert climate (Köppen: BWh), particularly in its southern zones. Summers are intensely hot, while winters are relatively mild. Rainfall is scarce and irregular, with most precipitation occurring during the brief monsoon period between August and September.

The tehsil's environmental vulnerability was highlighted during the 2022 Pakistan floods, which had a tangible impact on local infrastructure and livelihoods.

== Demographics and Education ==
Historical population
Year	Pop.	±% p.a.
1998	...	—
2017	21,491	—
2023	28,132	+4.59%
Source: Pakistan Bureau of Statistics:

As of the 2023 census, the population stands at 28,132, residing in 3,990 households. The literacy rate stands at 26.62%, with a significant gender disparity: 33.36% among men and 19.52% among women. These figures underscore systemic challenges in educational access, particularly for women and girls in remote and underserved rural communities.

=== Languages ===
Balochi is the overwhelmingly dominant language, spoken by an estimated 28,102 individuals, constituting approximately 99.8% of the population

== See also ==
- Tehsils of Pakistan
- Tehsils of Balochistan
- Districts of Balochistan
