= Parwar =

Parwar may refer to:

- Parwar, Pakistan, a town and union council in Balochistan province
- Paravar, caste of southern India
- Parwar (Jain community), a Jain community in Madhya Pradesh and Uttar Pradesh, India

== See also ==
- Parvardigar (disambiguation)
- Parvarish (disambiguation)
- Parwaria, a village in Madhya Pradesh, India
