= Boledehi =

Boledehi (بلیده ای) is a term referring to a group of Hakoms who are Khans and Sardars of Baloch tribe in Sarbaz and Chah Bahar, Makran region of Sistan and Baluchistan province of Iran.

For centuries, Boledehies were the Hakims (princes) of Dashtyari, Bahu and Rask. Their Hakimate in Bahu collapsed due to emigration and the attack of a Jadgali-speaking Baloch tribe known as the Sardarzahi (or Saddazahi), but they remained as influential hakims in Sarbaz and Nikshahr.
