= Korak Jhao Tehsil =

Pakistani administrative area

Korak Jhao کورک جاہو تحصیل
- Tehsil of Awaran District
- Location in Pakistan Korak Jhao (Pakistan)
- Coordinates: 26°50′48″N 65°44′0″E
- Country: Pakistan
- Province: Balochistan
- District: Awaran
- Tehsil: Korak Jhao

Area
  - Tehsil of Awaran District: 3,058 km^{2} (1,181 sq mi)

Population (2023)
  - Tehsil of Awaran District: 27,652
  - Density: 904/km^{2} (2,340/sq mi)
  - Rural: 27,652 (100%)

Literacy
  - Literacy rate: Total: (26.71%); Male: (34.69%); Female: (18.05%)
- Time zone: UTC+5 (PST)

Korak Jhao, also spelled Korak Jaho (Balochi: کورک جھاؤ) is an administrative subdivision (Tehsil) of Awaran District in Balochistan, Pakistan. Established in 2022, it is one of five Tehsils in the district, alongside Awaran, Gishkaur, Jhal Jhao, and Mashkay Tehsil.

== Geography ==
Korak Jhao spans approximately 3,058 square kilometres. It borders Mashkay to the northwest, Ornach Tehsil of Khuzdar District to the east, and Jhal Jhao Tehsil to the south. The terrain is predominantly arid and rugged hilly terrain traversed by seasonal streams.

== Population ==
Historical population
Year	Pop.	±% p.a.
1998	...	—
2017	18,519	—
2023	27,652	+6.91%
Sources:Source: Pakistan Bureau of Statistics:

According to the 2023 Census of Pakistan, Korak Jhao Tehsil has a total population of 27,652. Its population lives in rural areas. The tehsil covers an area of 3,058 square kilometres, resulting in a low population density of about 9.04 people per square kilometre.

The literacy rate in Korak Jhao Tehsil stands at 26.71%, with a gender disparity: 34.69% literacy among males and 18.05% among females. The age distribution reveals a youthful population, with 14,423 individuals (approximately 52%) under the age of 15. The working-age population (15-64 years) comprises 12,710 individuals, and those aged 65 and above number 519.

== See also ==
- Tehsils of Pakistan
- Districts of Pakistan
- Districts of Balochistan
