= Awaran Tehsil =

Pakistani administrative area

Awaran
- Tehsil of Awaran District
- Location within Balochistan, Pakistan Location within Pakistan
- Coordinates: 26°26′N 65°07′E
- Country: Pakistan
- Province: Balochistan
- District: Awaran District

Area
  - Tehsil of Awaran District: 13,075 km^{2} (5,048 sq mi)

Population (2023)
  - Tehsil of Awaran District: 45,774
  - Density: 3.5/km^{2} (9.1/sq mi)
  - Urban: 28,780 (62.87%)
  - Rural: 16,994 (37.13%)

Literacy
  - Literacy rate: Total: (42.90%); Male: (50.90%); Female: (34.92%)
- Time zone: UTC+5 (PST)
- Number of Union Councils: 3
- Main languages: 45,665 Balochi, 36 Urdu, 23 Sindhi
- Union Councils: Awaran; Teertaj

Awaran (Note: Balochi: تحصیل آواران, Urdu: تحصیل آواران pronounced [təh.siːl ɑː.ʋɑː.rɑːn]) is an administrative subdivision (tehsil) of Awaran District in southern Balochistan, Pakistan. It spans an area of approximately 13,075 square kilometres (5,048 sq mi). In 2023, the tehsil's population stood at 45,774, dispersed across 59 settlements. Nearly two-thirds of its inhabitants reside in the tehsil's administrative centre Awaran town.

== Geography ==
Positioned between the northern edge of the Makran Coastal Range and the slopes of the Central Makran Range, Awaran Tehsil covers roughly 13,075 square kilometres (1,307,500 ha).

It borders Ormara Tehsil to the south and divides Gishkaur Tehsil into two parts to its east and west. On its northern-western side it shares boundaries with Hoshab, Gowargo, and Gichk Tehsils, while Mashkay Tehsil lies to the north and Jhal Jhao Tehsil to the east.

The landscape is largely uninhabited, hilly, and with elevations averaging around 1,000 metres (3,300 ft). The terrain is arid, featuring ephemeral rivers and drought-resistant xerophytic vegetation. The 2013 earthquake caused notable structural damage across.

== Population ==
Historical population
Year	Pop.	±% p.a.
1981	...	—
1998	27,156	—
2017	30,345	+0.59%
2023	45,774	+7.09%
Sources:Source: Pakistan Bureau of Statistics:

As per the 2023 national census, Awaran tehsil has a population of 45,774, with 16,994 people residing in rural areas and 28,870 urban areas. The town of Awaran serves as the tehsil headquarters. There are 6,471 households, 2,486 in rural and 3,985 in urban settings.

The overall literacy rate is 42.90%, including 50.90% among males and 34.92% among females, pointing to persistent educational disparities, particularly for women.

== Languages ==
Languages of Awaran tehsil (2023)
1. Balochi (99.8%)
2. Others (0.26%)

Balochi is the overwhelmingly dominant language in Awaran Tehsil, accounting for approximately 99.76% of the population. Other languages include reported include Urdu (36 speakers, ~0.08%), Sindhi (23 speakers, ~0.05%), and Brahui (22 speakers, 0.05%). It is noteworthy that "Sindhi" in this context largely refers to Lasi, a distinct regional dialect spoken in the coastal areas of Balochistan.

== Infrastructure ==
Infrastructure in Awaran Tehsil remains underdeveloped relative to national standards. Road connectivity is limited, with a few paved routes linking Awaran town to neighbouring tehsils, while many rural settlements rely on unpaved or seasonal roads that become inaccessible during heavy rains. Public transport services exist but are irregular and often inadequate for the needs of the population.

Basic services such as electricity and potable water are available in the main town but remain inconsistent or absent in outlying villages. Healthcare facilities are sparse, typically consisting of small basic health units or dispensaries with limited staff and equipment. Residents frequently travel to larger towns or cities for specialised medical care.

Telecommunications coverage has improved with the installation of cellular networks, though signal strength and internet access vary across the tehsil. Educational infrastructure consists primarily of primary and middle schools, with a few secondary institutions concentrated in Awaran town. The shortage of qualified teachers and school facilities further contributes to low literacy rates, especially in rural areas.

== See also ==
- List of tehsils in Pakistan
  - List of tehsils of Balochistan
