= Zikrism =

Islamic Mahdiist sect

- Type: Islamic movement
- Scripture: Quran
- Founder: Nur Pak
- Separated from: Sunni Islam

Zikrism (Balochi: ذکری, romanized: Zikri, lit. 'Remembrance'), also known as Zigri (ذگری), is a Mahdist minority Islamic sect found primarily in the Balochistan region of Pakistan. However, they follow different prayer practices and believe the Mahdi (the messiah figure and final leader in Islamic eschatology who is believed to appear at the end of times to rid the world of evil and injustice) has already arrived. Koh-e-Murad (كوه مراد) is the most sacred site for Zikris.

They suffered sectarian attacks before the founding of Pakistan and more recent attacks and insecurity episodes have led some of them to migrate from Balochistan to other cities within Pakistan. Baloch nationalism is more common amongst Zikris in comparison to other Baloch Islamic sects.

== Etymology ==
The name Zikrism (also known as Zikriyya) originates from the Arabic word Dhikr (ذِكْر) meaning 'remembrance' or 'pronouncement'. The letter Dhāl (ذ) is pronounced with a voiced dental fricative, while the majority of Indo-Iranian languages lack this sound. This leads to Dhāl (ذ) being pronounced as Zāl (ذ) with a voiced alveolar fricative.

== Origins ==
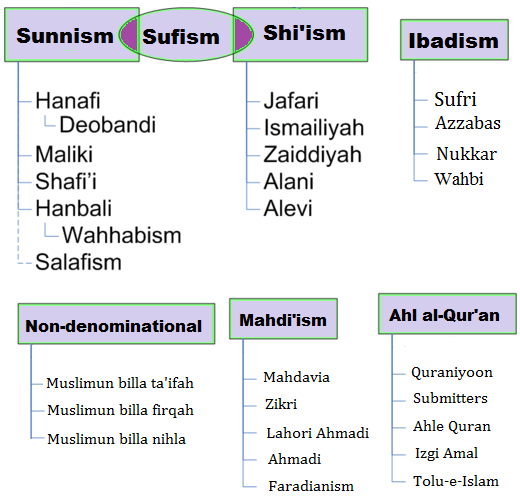
Zikrism is considered as a Mahdhist movement within Islam

The Zikri faith developed within Makran in the late 16th-century. Some Zikris believe the founder of their sect to be a "Mullah Attocki", who came from Attock in Punjab and propagated the faith in Makran, although others dispute it. According to Stephen Blake, an Afghan named "Mulla Muhammad" declared himself Mahdi and formed the Zikri movement, which faced persecution from local—Imperial Mughal—authorities. Some scholars believe that Zikris are an offshoot of a Sufi tradition that branched off from the Ni'matullāhī Sufi order of Iran.

A number of sources discuss how Syed Muhammad Jaunpuri is thought to be by some, the founder of Zikrism, (Note: Connection of Mohammad Jawanpuri and Zikrism: "The founder of the Zikrism is believed to be Seyyed Mohammad Jawanpuri, who in the 15th century declared himself the last Mahdi. He started to preach his doctrine in Makran, around the Koh-i Morad, after several pilgrimages to Mecca and Medina and wanderings in Turkey and Syria..."; "Various theses have been put forward concerning the identity of the Mahdi of the Zikris. URRAZAI describes four major opinions" [one of which is] ... the hypothesis that he [Sayyid Muhammad Jaunpuri who founded the ... Mahdavia sect] is the Mahdi is the one that has been advocated by many non-local writers (and a few Zikri writers)."; "Some people believe that they are the followers of Syed Mohammad Jaunpuri, but others disagree and say that they believe in Prophet Mohammad as the last prophet and Holy Quran as the last divine book."; "According to historian and writer Dr. Shah Mohammad Marri based in Quetta, Zikris can be called ‘pure’ as they are not a mix of any other race. Belonging to the Mehdvi sect, founded in the 15th century by Syed Mohammad Jaunpuri, the Zikris were initially Zartosht (Zoroastrian), then converted and became Sunnis and later started Zikr, journalist Ayaz Sangur explained."; "As a bounded community, the Zikris' origin seems to be linked to a historical moment in 1496 when one Syed Muhammad Jaupuri (d. 1505) declared himself as the Mahdi, or messianic redeemer of Islam.") Two scholars (Robert Benkin and Sabir Badalkhan), deny this however. Benkin writes that outside observers have claimed the Mahdi figure of the Baloch Zikris was Jaunpuri, however Baloch Zikris deny that he visited Balochistan and insist their Mahdi is a different figure from a later period. Zikris believe Nur Pak was born in 977 AH, or between 1569 and 1570 AD, living and dying within the Kech region

However, Marmara University and Necmettin Erbakan University of Turkey say that the claim of Jaunpuri being the founder of Zikrism lacks credible evidence and is unsupported by historical or factual data. According to them, the theological and ritual framework of the Zikri faith cannot be traced to him. Instead, historical and textual sources identify "Muhammad Atki" as the true founder of the Zikri religion, whose teachings reflect an independent intellectual and spiritual development, distinct from Mahdavi principles.

== Beliefs ==
Zikris believe in a Mahdi figure known as Nur Pak (نور پاک; lit. 'Pure Light'). Zikris believe Nur Pak walked the earth before Adam and will return at the end of days to restore true Islam which has been perverted by Sunnism.

Some scholars argue that Zikris regard Nur Pak as both their prophet and the promised Mahdi. Nur Pak is considered a primordial figure who existed before Adam and is believed to return before Akhir Zaman (lit. 'end times') to reform Islam. They further maintain that he reappeared in the 15th century, during which time he revealed new teachings. While Zikris hold the Prophet Muhammad in reverence, they believe that his teachings were superseded by those of Khudodad, the lit. 'gift of God', an enigmatic figure said to have lived seven generations earlier.

Dhikr occupies a central place in Zikri religious practice and refers specifically to the recitation of the names of Allah. They reportedly refer to other Muslims as Namazi due to their performance of Namaz (نماز; Persian term for prayer). Unlike mainstream Muslims, they do not pray five times a day, but rather perform Dhikr five times daily instead. Their prayer house is known as a Zikrkhana.

Instead of observing the fast during the month of Ramadan, Zikris observe a seven-day fast each month throughout the year. Zikris observe a week-long fast prior to Eid al-Adha, a practice not observed by Muslims generally.

Within Zikrism, ushr is practiced at a rate of one-tenth rather than zakat, which is levied at one-fortieth. In contrast to other orthodox Islamic communities, Zikri women play an active role in both religious and socio-political spheres.

Zikris do not undertake in the Hajj pilgrimage, which is a religious obligation in Islam for those who are able to perform it. Instead, they travel to Koh-e-Murad, where they perform specific rituals.

The Zikri Muslims hold reverence to the Hinglaj Mata Temple. They call the temple Nani Mandir, which means "maternal grandmother's temple". They have also provided security for the Hinglaj temple.

Zikris state that there are no relations between Zikri and Mahdavi communities, and that their beliefs and practices are distinct.

== Practices ==
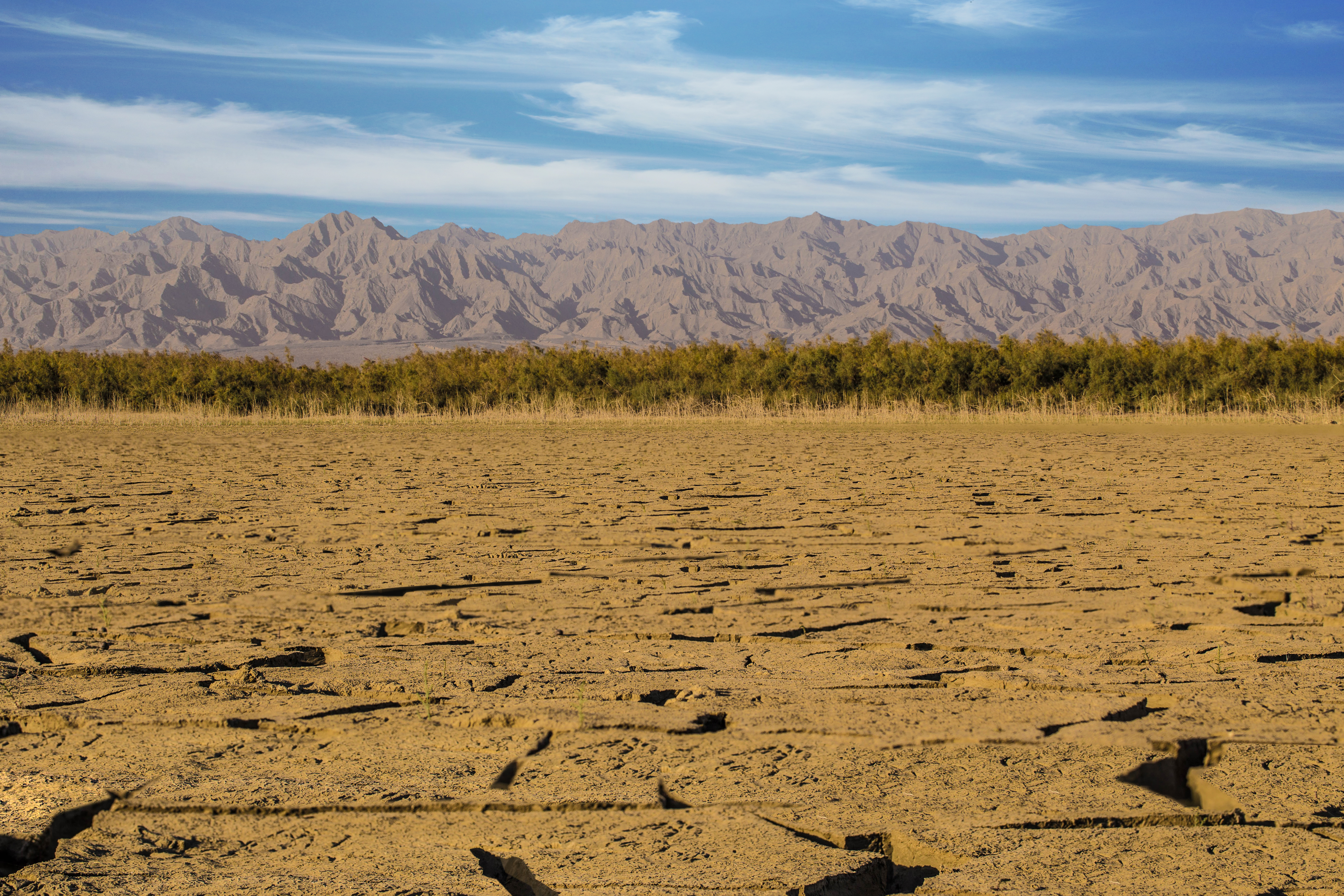
Mountains around Turbat viewed from the Mirani Dam

Zikris make pilgrimage (Ziyarat) to Koh-e-Murad, lit. 'Mountain of Desire' in Balochi, on the 27th of Ramadan in commemoration of the Mahdi. They observe this day as a sacred holiday. The descendants of the original believers of the Mahdi continue to lead the Zikri community and are known as Murshids. Zikris refer to them as Waja as a form of respect. Early that morning, Zikris observe Shab-e-Qadr, the commemoration of Muhammad receiving his first revelation from the angel Jibrīl.

The five prayers within Zikrism are known as Gwarbamay, Nemrochay, Rochzarday, Sarshapay, and Nemhangamay. Rochzarday and Nemhangamay may be performed individually, with all others being performed in a group.

Zikri places of worship are called Zikr Khanas or Zigrāna (lit. 'House of Zikr'). Zikris gather at three times a day at Zikr Khanas and perform a special prayer in a square formation with the leader in the middle. This prayer consists of formulae in Persian and Balochi, Quranic verses, and the repetition of God's name while standing, sitting, and prostrating. Zikri worshippers wear white or light-colored clothing, wash before participating, and cover their head with a scarf or handkerchief called a rumal. Non-Zikris are forbidden to attend Zikri worship services at the Zikr Khana. Zikr Khanas were often built on Astanas, places deemed holy by the Zikri community. This could be a place a Murshid meditated or the former home of a community leader. Unlike mosques, Zikr Khanas lack a Mihrab and Minarets.

Contrary to some popular beliefs, Zikri do not have a separate holy book than the Quran or in addition to the Quran. According to Sabir Badalkhan, they keep copies of the Quran in Zikr Khanas on shelves or in niches, "usually wrapped in clean costly cloth" and are treated with customary reverence, being kissed by Zikris after recitation of a verse.

On special occasions, Zikris observe Chaugan, songs of praise for Muhammad, the Mahdi, Turbat, and Koh-e-Murad, accompanied by ritual dance-like movements. Members stay up all night performing devotions. A female reciter known as the Shehr stands in the middle of the formation reciting devotions to which the male group calls back.

Chaugans are sung in celebration of religious events such as the 27th of Ramadan, Shab-i-Barat (the 15th day of Sha'ban), and Eid al-Adha. Zikris believe the fourteenth day of the lunar month, if it falls on a Friday, to be auspicious, and may perform the Chaugan then. The Chaugan festival of Ramadan is a 7-day festival with a collective prayer on 27th of Ramadan. In 2024, about 215,000 people attended the festivities.

== Persecution ==
Zikris faced persecution in the 18th-century under the rule of Mir Nasir Khan the Great, the Sunni Muslim ruler of the Khanate of Kalat. Their religious and historical records were destroyed and surviving information was carried on by oral tradition and non-Zikri writings. Nasir Khan waged a war to convert Zikris to Sunni Islam, killing 35,000 Zikris, in a period known as the "Zikri-Namazi war". Sunni Islam became the dominant religion in Balochistan with modern Zikris living in more remote areas.

In the 1930s, within Iranian Sistan-Baluchestan, an extremist known as Qazi Abdullah Sarbazi declared jihad against Zikris, "which resulted in a major massacre" and the driving out of Zikri from that area. Also in that era, "hundreds of other Zikris were killed" in periodic pogroms by "fanatic Sunnis at the instigation" of their religious leaders in the areas of Farod, Baftan and Kishkaur (in Balochistan), according to Abdul Ghani Baloch.

After the establishment of Pakistan, Sunni Muslims attacked Zikris and subjected them to forced conversions. With the rise of Islamic extremism and jihadism in the region since the 1980s, Zikris have been discriminated against, targeted, and killed by Sunni militants in Pakistan. Under the military government of former-President Zia-ul-Haq, Sunnis sought to have Zikris declared as non-Muslims. In the 1990s, Zikris were harassed, and protestors called for the destruction of their shrines.

The persecution of Zikris by Sunni militants as of 2014 has been part of the larger backlash against religious minorities in Pakistani Balochistan, targeting Hindus, Hazaras, Shias, and Zikris, resulting in the migration of over 300,000 Shias, Zikris, and Hindus from Pakistani Balochistan. The militant groups Lashkar-e-Jhangvi and the Pakistani Taliban (TTP) were responsible for persecutions.

During the 1990s, there was a movement among Sunnis to declare Zikris non-Muslim, and a campaign was mounted against their annual congregation at Kohei-Murad in Turbat. This was accompanied by demonstrations calling for the destruction of the Zikri Baitullah (lit. 'House of God'), and members of the sect were subjected to violence and harassment.

An attack occurred August 29, 2014, on a shrine in the Awaran District. Gunmen killed at least six Zikris and wounded seven others. On October 7, 2016, a gunman shot a Zikri religious leader dead in the Kech District of Balochistan. In August 2017, two Zikri pilgrims were killed and two were wounded when a bomb detonated in the Kamp Tal area of Pangjur, Balochistan.

== Population ==
Map of the Makran Division within Balochistan province

The U.S. Senate Committee on Foreign Relations in 2004 stated that there were approximately 200,000 Zikris. Victoria Williams estimates the number of Zikris at 800,000 and Sabir Badalkhan at around 600,000–700,000. A Dawn news article mentioned the Zikri population to be around 600,000 to 700,000 with more than 100,000 living in Karachi. The actual size of the population is difficult to determine, as Zikris in Pakistan often identify as Barelvi Sunni Muslims to avoid threats from militant groups. In places such as Attock, Bahawalpur, Karachi, Lasbela District, and Quetta, they present themselves as Barelvi Sunni and refrain from publicly expressing their distinct religious practices. In contrast, in the Makran division in Balochistan, where Zikris openly observe their rituals.

Zikris live primarily in Pakistani Balochistan, concentrated in the southern coast of Makran region, with significant population in the Awaran District , Mashkay and Gresha areas of Khuzdar District and in parts of Lasbela District and Quetta. They are a majority in the Gwadar District. There are sizable communities of Zikris in Sindh province's capital Karachi, especially in the Lyari Town. While Zikris also historically lived in the Iranian province of Sistan and Baluchestan, almost all of them left for Pakistani Balochistan in the last decades of the 20th century. Some Zikris have migrated from Pakistan to the Arabian Peninsula where most live in Oman.

Persecution has driven hundreds of Zikri and other minorities from Balochistan to safer cities in Pakistan like Karachi, Lahore, Rawalpindi, and Islamabad.

Pakistani Balochistan has a population of people of African descent via slavery. In the Makran region, many of these Afro-Baloch people follow the Zikri sect.

== Bibliography ==
- Badalkhan, Sabir (2008). "Zikri Dilemmas: Origins, Religious practices, and political constraints". In Carina Jahani; Agnes Korn; Paul Titus (eds.). The Baloch and Others: Linguistic, Historical and Socio-Political Perspectives on Pluralism in Balochistan. pp. 293–326.
- Benkin, Robert (2017). What is Moderate Islam?. Lexington Books. p. 102. ISBN 9781498537421.
- Mawani, Rizwan (2019). Beyond the Mosque: Diverse Spaces of Muslim Worship. IB Tauris. ISBN 978-1788315272.
- Pastner, Stephen L.; Flam, Louis (1982). Anthropology in Pakistan: Recent Socio-Cultural and Archeological Perspectives. Cornell University.
- Pastner, Stephen L. (1984). "Feuding with the spirit among the Zikri Baluch: the saint as champion of the despised". In Ahmed, Akbar (ed.). Islam in Tribal Societies: From the Atlas to the Indus. London: Routledge. p. 303. ISBN 9781315889146. At Anna's Archive.
