= Nokjo =

Pakistani town

Nokjo نوکوجو
- Town and union council
- Interactive map of Nokjo نوکوجو
- Coordinates: 28°23′20″N 66°13′20″E
- Country: Pakistan
- Region: Balochistan
- District: Awaran District
- Time zone: UTC+5 (PST)

Nokjo (Balochi, Urdu: نوکوجو) is a town and union council located in Mashkay Tehsil of Awaran District, in the southern province of Balochistan, Pakistan. Situated at an elevation of approximately 1,706 metres (5,597 ft) above sea level, Nokjo lies within the Central Makran Range and is characterised by its mountainous terrain, arid climate, and remote setting. As an administrative unit, the town plays a role in local governance in one of the province's less densely populated regions.
