= Jadgal people =

Ethnic group in Balochistan

Jadgal
Nummaṛ نماڑ الزيغآلي

Regions with significant populations
- Pakistan: 100,000
- Iran: 25,000

Languages
- Jadgali and Balochi (Makrani dialect)

Religion
- Islam

Related ethnic groups
- Sindhis

The Jaḍgāl (lit. 'Jaṭṭ-speakers'; also known as Jatgal, Nummaṛ or az-Zighālī) is an Indo-Aryan ethno-linguistic group which speaks the Jadgali language. Jadgals are present in the Balochistan region of Iran and Pakistan, as well as in Oman.

== History ==
Jadgal people are often connected with the Jats of Balochistan. They migrated from Sindh via Bela to Panjgur. Anthropologist Henry Field notes the origin of the Jadgals to be in the western Indian subcontinent; they subsequently migrated to Kulanch and are still found in Sindh and Balochistan. Regardless of their origins, they are generally seen as Baloch by the society in Balochistan.

When the Arabs arrived in modern-day Sindh and Baluchistan, they met the Jadgal at the coast of Makran where the Arab name of az-Zighālī comes from. In 1811, Saidi Balochis as well as Jadgal mercenary troops were killed in a battle with the Wahhabis against the Sultanate of Oman. The modern-day Jadgals in Oman claim to be descended from Arabs, however they also accept the folk etymology of them being from Sindh, in the lower Indus valley.

== Demographics ==
Around 100,000 Jadgals live in Pakistan according to a 1998 census conducted by Pakistan. In Iran, the Sardarzahi ethnic group is of Jadgal origin, claiming to be from Sindh. The rest of the Jadgals number around 25,000 according to a 2008 census conducted by Iran. All of the Jadgals in Iran live in the Sistan and Baluchistan, Hormozgan and Kerman provinces.

== Language ==
Jadgal people in Balochistan speak Jadgali language, although they converse with strangers in Balochi. Many linguists believe the Lasi dialect of the Lasi people may be related to Jadgali. The Jadgali tongue in Oman is similar to the language of Al Lawatia.

== Tribes ==
- Sardarzahi
- Bizenjo
- Zehri
- Sasoli
- Sangur
- Mengal
- Zardari
