= Gwadar Bay =

Gwadar Bay can refer to any of three adjacent bays:

- Gwadar East Bay or Demi Zirr, a deep water bay to the east of the Gwadar peninsula, in southwest Pakistan.
- Gwadar West Bay or Paddi Zirr, a shallow bay to the west of the Gwadar peninsula.
- Gwatar Bay, a slightly larger bay about 30 km (19 mi) west of Gwadar West Bay.
