= Gishkaur =

Pakistani town

Gishkaur گیشکور
- Town and union council
- Interactive map of Gishkaur گیشکور
- Coordinates: 26°03′24″N 63°28′6″E
- Country: Pakistan
- Region: Balochistan
- District: Awaran District
- Elevation: 305 m (1,001 ft)

Population (2023)
  - Total: 31,462
- Time zone: UTC+5 (PST)

Gishkaur, also spelled Gish Kaur or Gishkore (Balochi, Balochi: گیشکور) is a town and the administrative centre of Gishkaur Tehsil in Awaran District, south Balochistan, Pakistan.

It is situated on the M-8 Motorway between Hoshab and Turbat, near the confluence of the intermitted Gish and Kech Rivers, at an elevation of 305 metres (1,001 ft).

In the federal budget for 2024–25, the Government of Pakistan allocated funds for the construction of the Gish Kaur Storage Dam in nearby Kech District.

The town was severely impacted by the 2007 floods, which affected 295 households (1,038 people).
