= Jhal Jhao =

Town in Balochistan, Pakistan

Jhal Jhao جھلجاؤ
- Location within Pakistan
- Coordinates: 26.18°N 65.34°E
- Country: Pakistan
- Province: Balochistan
- Elevation: 347 m (1,138 ft)
- Time zone: UTC+5 (PST)

Jhal Jhao (Urdu: جھلجاؤ) is a small town located in the southern part of Balochistan, Pakistan in Awaran District. It is located at 26°18'10N 65°34'49E and has an altitude of 347 m (1141 ft) The town's population is around 10,000 as of 2005. The town is mostly constituted of mud houses and small canals that supply water. It is surrounded by tall, arid mountains and deserts. The only way to enter and exit Jhal Jhao is by the Bela Awaran Road.

The town does not have a lot of income, as there is not a wide range of economic industry in the area. It is also impossible to cultivate anything near Jhal Jhao as it is too arid or hot. Rainfall comes only 2-3 times a year, never exceeding 20 mm. Most of the income comes from the town's shoe-making industry.

In 1987, US aid developed a small road which would link Jhal Jhao with the Bela Awaran Road. Before that, the only way to enter Jhal Jhao was through air transport, specifically helicopters. There are currently no construction projects happening in Jhal Jhao.
