= Dashtiari =

Dashtiari or Dashtyari (Persian: دشتیاری) is the name of a region in south-eastern Iran. It may also refer specifically to:

- Dashtiari County, an administrative division of Sistan and Baluchestan province
- Polan, Iran, a village in Polan District
- Dashtiari River
