= Sindhis of Balochistan =

Indigenous Sindhi people of Balochistan

The Sindhis of Balochistan are an indigenous Sindhi population living in Balochistan, Pakistan.

== History ==
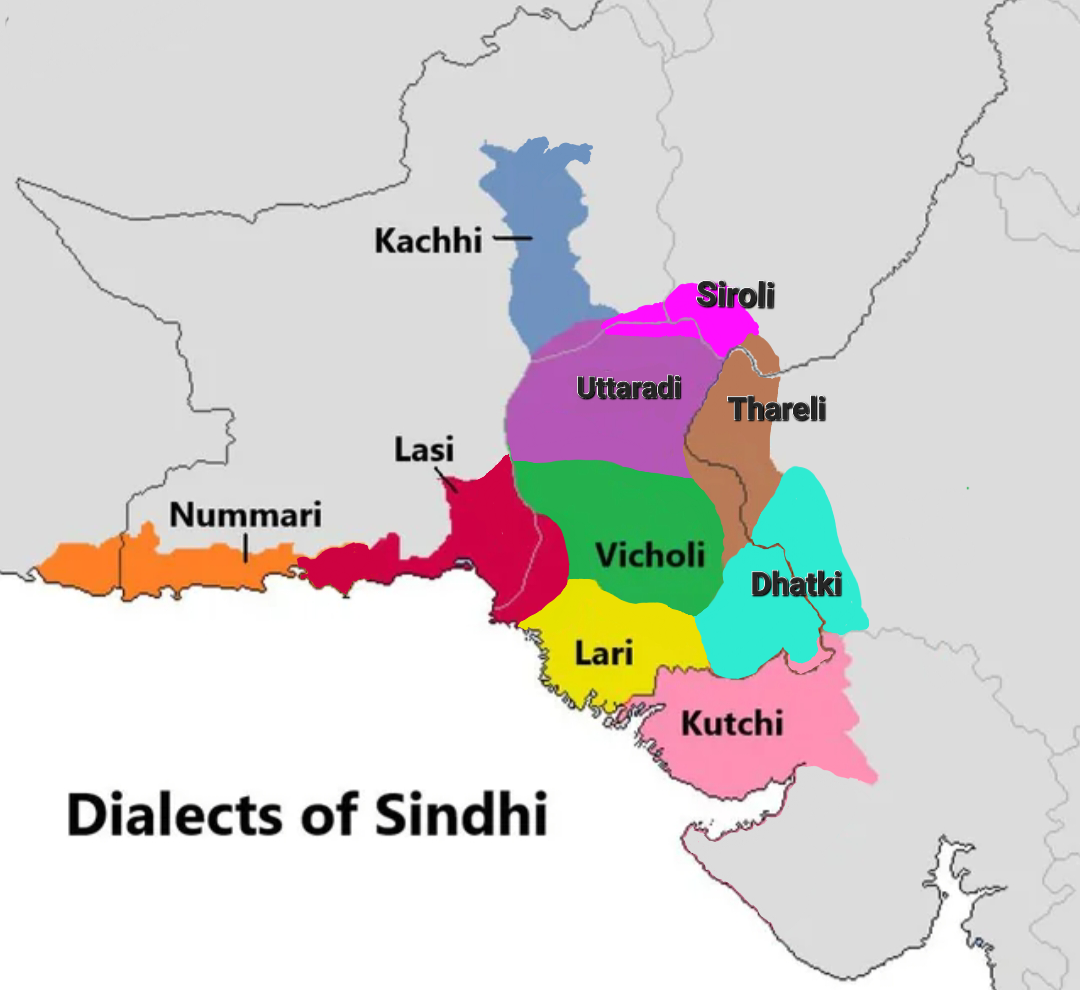
Map of Sindhi dialects, with clear spillover into Balochistan

Before the migration of the Baloch into the region now known as Balochistan, some Arab writers noted the presence of tribes such as the Meds and Zutts. Zutt was an Arabic exonym applied to the various tribes found across the lower Indus valley, including those who inhabited parts of Makran and Kaikan.

Arab writers mentioned the Baloch living in the eastern regions of Iran in the 9th century. They would then be pushed further east into Pakistani Balochistan by Persian and Turkic dynasties like the Buyids, Ghaznavids, and Seljuqs. Once settled, the Baloch would use the term "Jadgal" (lit. 'Jaṭṭ-speakers', i.e. those who speak the language of the [Sindhi] Jats) to identify all the native Sindhis they interacted with, regardless of their tribe.

The Jats of Balochistan are a group of Sindhi-origin (Jadgal, Jamote and Sindhi Jat) tribes which live in the region, and they are generally accepted as Baloch.

The Sindhi Hindu Brahman dynasty ruled Sindh and parts of Balochistan under Chach of Aror. After their conversion to Islam, the Sindhi-origin Soomras, Sammas, Kalhoras, and the princely rulers of Makran and Las Bela continued to rule over parts of Balochistan. The Arghuns and Talpurs, though not being of Sindhi-origin, would also rule some parts of Balochistan from their capitals in Sindh.

== See also ==
- Balochistan
- Sindhis
