= Jiwani Coastal Wetland =

Wetland located in Balochistan, Pakistan

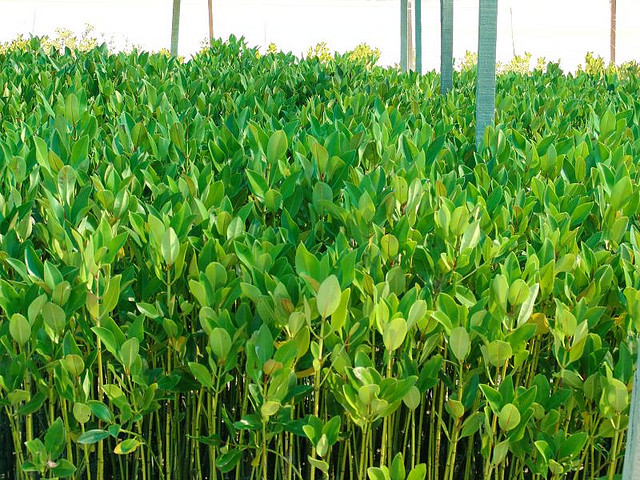
- Mangrove tree nursery in Jiwani Coastal Wetland
- Interactive map of Jiwani Coastal Wetland
- Type: Coastal wetland
- Location: Gwatar Bay, Balochistan, Pakistan
- Coordinates: 25°08′N 61°46′E
- Area: 4,600 acres (19 km^{2})

Ramsar Wetland
- Designated: 10 May 2001
- Reference no.: 1066

The Jiwani Coastal Wetland is a wetland located in Balochistan, Pakistan, near the town of Jiwani. The site is one of the 19 Ramsar sites in Pakistan and was inducted in 2001.

== Location and geography ==
The site is a lagoon, located at the northeastern edge of Gwatar Bay, south of the delta of the Dasht River, northeast of the town of Jiwani in Gwadar District of Balochistan Province, Pakistan.

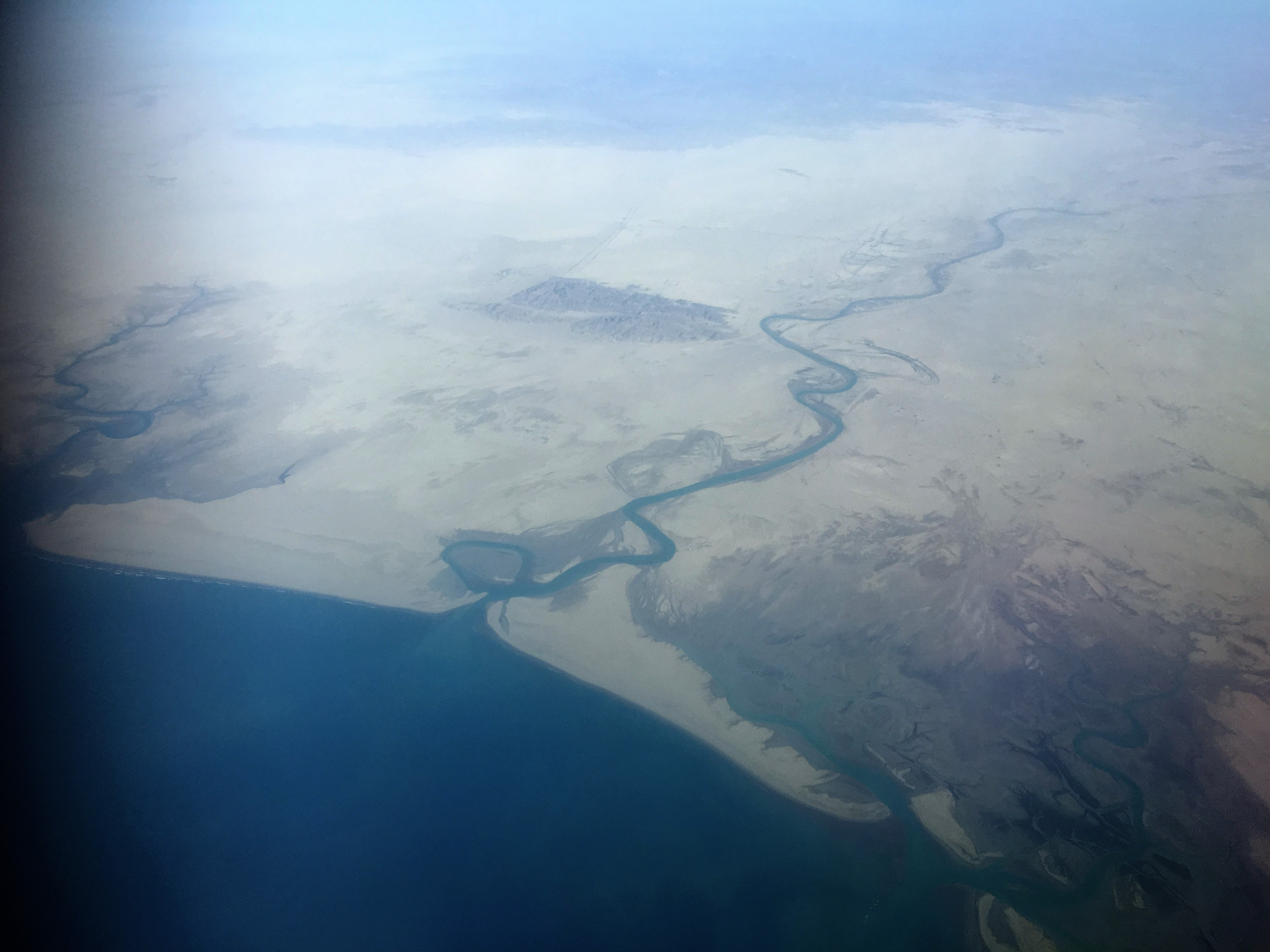
Aerial view of part of the lagoon at the bottom left, adjacent to the mouth of the Dasht River.

The wetland has an area of 19 km^{2} (4,600 acres). The lagoon contains extensive mangrove swamps, many sandy beaches, sand bars and islets. The climate is arid with very low rainfall. The Dasht river is the main source of fresh water for the mangrove forest and the region along with the seasonal runoff of rainwater from the nearby hills.

== Flora and fauna ==
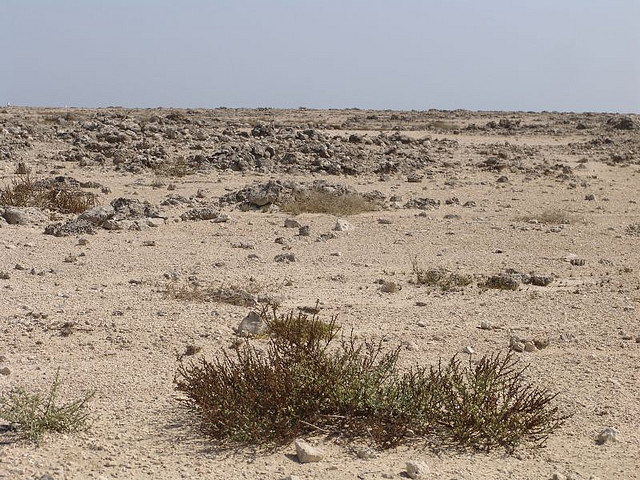
Dead Coral ground in Jiwani Coastal Wetland

The Jiwani coast provides two main ecological habitats; the mangrove swamps and the sandy beaches. The site near the delta is swampy and marshy and is covered with one of the three species of Mangroves in Pakistan; Avicennia marina. Jiwani is also an important nesting site for the endangered olive ridley sea turtle and green sea turtles. The four turtle beaches where they nest are clustered on the eastern side of the coastline and are considered one of the most important marine turtle sites in Pakistan.

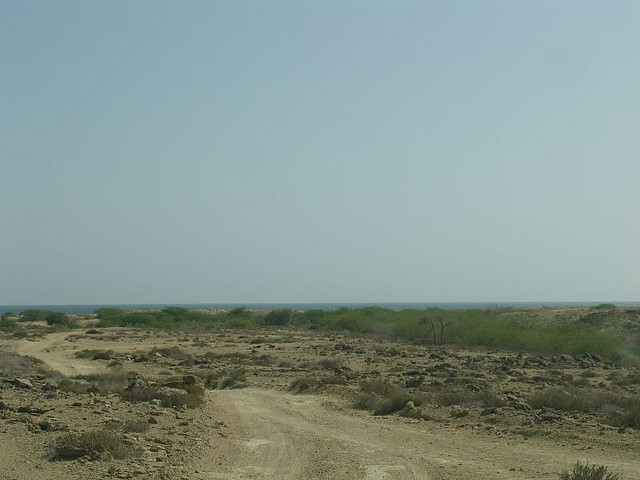
Dead Coral ground

Each year, thousands of migratory birds are sighted in the region. According to the book Avian Diversity of Jiwani Coastal Wetlands, Pakistan, 112 species of birds were recorded of which 79 species were migratory and 33 were resident. Of the 79 migratory species, 54 migrated during winter, 11 migrated during summer, 10 were year-round visitors, and 3 species were vagrant.

== Conservation ==
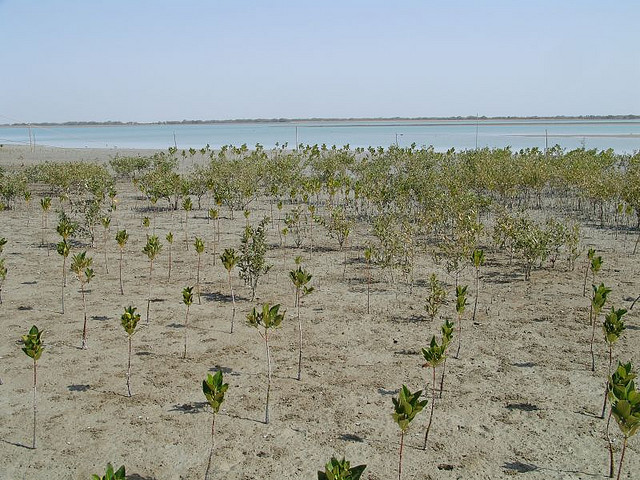
Mangrove forest plantations for conservation in the wetlands.

Fishing is the major source of income for the locals however plans to grant fishing and offshore drilling rights to foreign firms have increased the concerns of conservation authorities. The local community uses the mangrove wood for domestic use which is threatening the mangrove forest. Balochistan Conservation Strategy to promote sustainable development in Balochistan emphasises the conservation of these coastal wetlands. In 1999, WWF–Pakistan initiated conservation drives, Mangrove Conservation Project and Turtle Conservation Project, to protect the wetlands from adverse effects and threats.

== See also ==
- Wetlands of Pakistan
- Protected areas of Pakistan
