= Sangur =

Nomadic tribe in Balochistan

سنگور

Regions with significant populations
- Baluchistan, Pakistan, Iranian Baluchistan

Languages
- Jadgali

Religion
- Islam

Related ethnic groups
- Jadgals, Sindhis

Sangur are a tribe of the Jadgal people that is scattered from the Iranian Makran to Lasbela in Pakistan. They claim affinity with the Jokhio tribe of Sindh.

== Description ==
According to their tradition, they migrated from Sindh toward Kalat, Balochistan, where they remained and settled. They were later forced to migrate to Makran likely due to the Brahui–Jadgal war of the fifteenth century. Sangurs are nomadic, and known for camel breeding, flock owning and farming.
