= Parvardigar (disambiguation) =

Parvardigar is a Persian name of God.

Parvardigar may also refer to:

- O' Parvardigar (EP) – a 2001 EP by Pete Townshend
- Meher Baba's prayer, O Parvardigar

== See also ==
- Parwar (disambiguation)
