= Shooli =

Village in Balochistan, Pakistan

Shooli Dasht Shuleeg
- Village
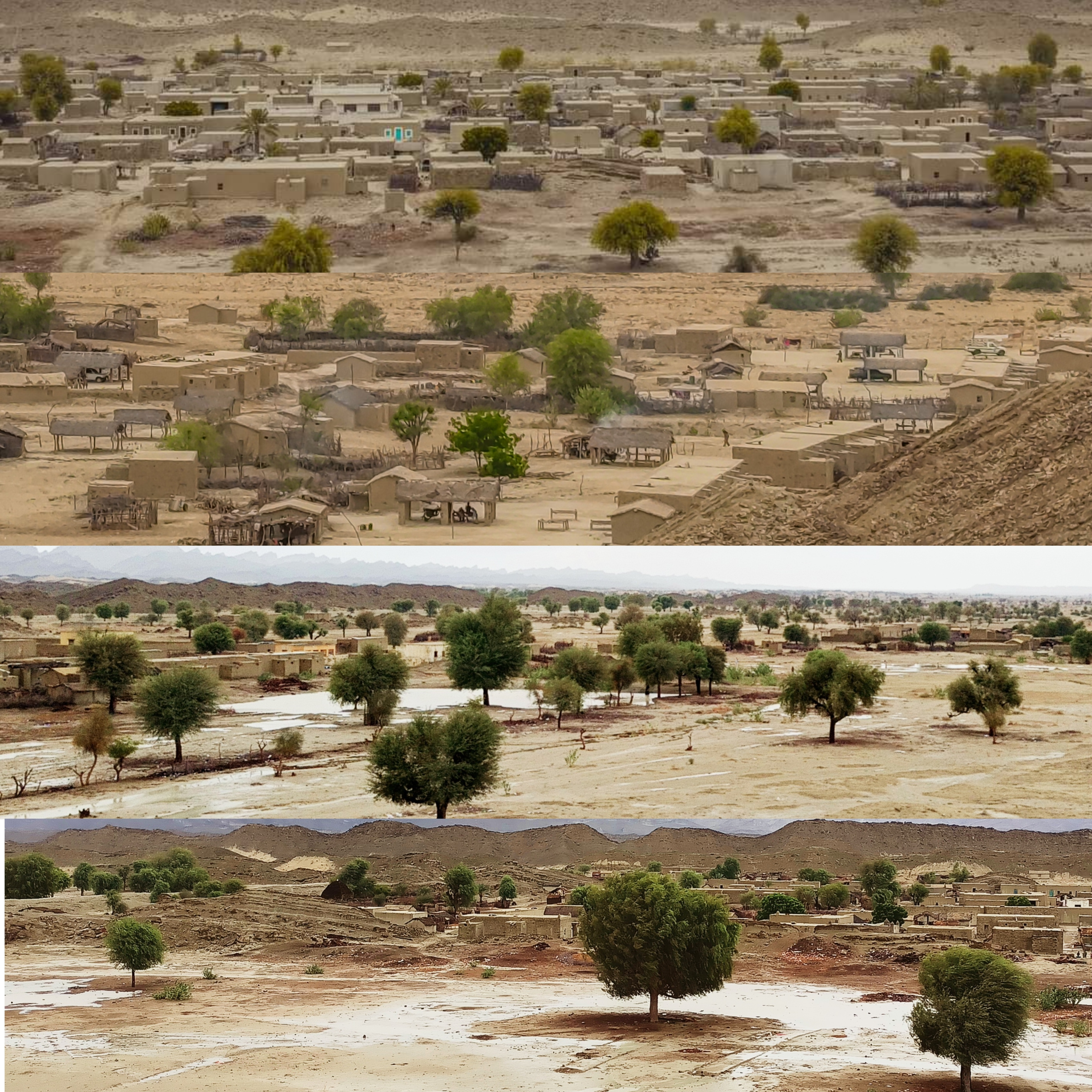
- Image of Dasht Shuleeg (Urdu :Shooli) Village

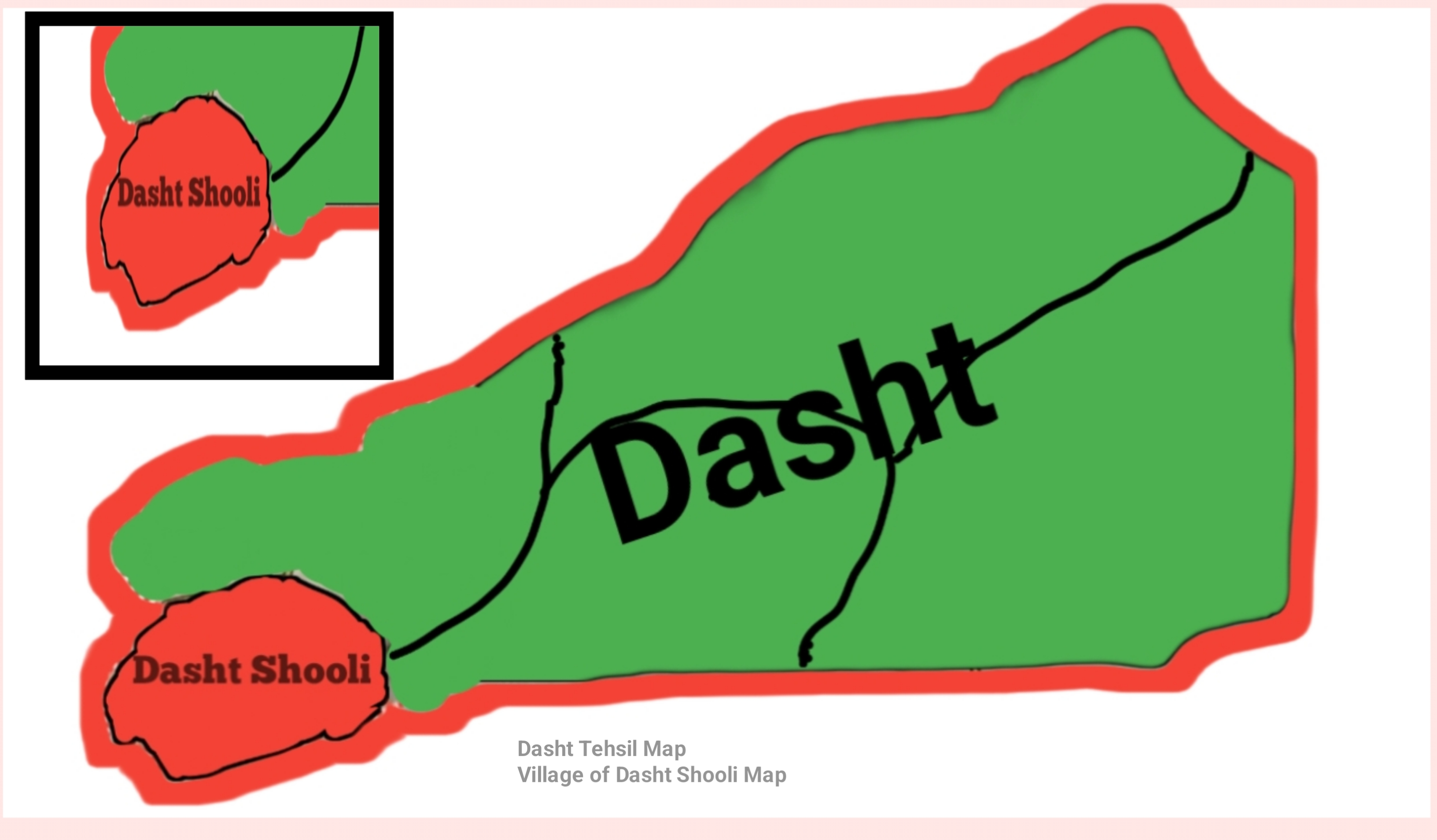
- Dasht Shuli Map location

- Location within Balochistan, Pakistan Location within Pakistan
- Coordinates: 25°34′06″N 62°08′38″E
- Country: Pakistan
- Province: Balochistan

Population (2017 Census of Pakistan)
  - Total: 2,219
- Time zone: UTC+5 (PST)

Dasht Shuleeg (Urdu: دشت شولی) also called Shooli is a small village in the Kech District, of the Makran Division of Balochistan province in Pakistan.

Population of this village is 2,219 per 2017 Census of Pakistan.

The village is located in Dasht Tehsil of Kech District, in the western part of Balochistan. It is situated north of the Gwadar District, close to the Iranian border.

Shaheed Abdul Sattar Born 2005 in Shooli Dasht, abducted by Forces 12 November 2024, and Killed fake incounter after 11 Month on 19 September 2025
