= Bazdad =

- Location within Pakistan
- Coordinates: 26.20°N 65.3°E
- Country: Pakistan
- Province: Balochistan
- Time zone: UTC+5 (PST)

Bazdad is a town in the Awaran District of Balochistan province, Pakistan. It is located at 26°20'59N 65°3'2E and has an altitude of 531 metres (1745 feet).
