= Mashkay Tehsil =

Pakistani administrative area

Mashkai Tehsil Balochi: تحصیل مشکے Mashkay Tehsil
- Tehsil of Awaran District
- Location within Balochistan, Pakistan Location within Pakistan
- Coordinates: 27°7′29″N 65°40′10″E
- Country: Pakistan
- Province: Balochistan
- District: Awaran District
- Headquarters: Gajjar

Area
  - Tehsil of Awaran District: 2,418 km^{2} (934 sq mi)

Population (2023)
  - Tehsil of Awaran District: 45,938
  - Density: 19/km^{2} (49/sq mi)
  - Urban: 18,056 (39.31%)
  - Rural: 27,882 (60.69%)

Literacy
  - Literacy rate: Total: (41.21%); Male: (48.92%); Female: (32.70%)
- Time zone: UTC+5 (PST)
- Number of Union Councils: 3
- Main languages: 43,649 (99.88%) Balochi, 2,069 Brahui

Mashkay, also spelled Mashkai, (Note: Balochi: مشکے, Urdu: مشکے, pronounced [məʃˈkeː]) is an administrative subdivision (tehsil) of Awaran District in southern Balochistan, Pakistan, covering an area of approximately 2,418 square kilometres (934 sq mi). According to the 2023 national census, it has a population of approximately 45,938 residents distributed across 129 settlements. Administratively, Mashkay is sub-divided into three Union Councils: Gajjar, Nokjo, and Parwar.

== Geography ==
Mashkai is situated in the northern part of Awaran District, within the Central Makran Range. It shares borders with Awaran Tehsil to the south and Korak Jhao Tehsil to the east. To the southwest, it borders Gichk Tehsil of Panjgur District, while its western boundary meets Besima Tehsil in Washuk District. To the northeast lie the tehsils of Gresha and Nal in Khuzdar District.

The landscape is predominantly mountainous, with elevations around 1,000 metres (3,300 ft). The terrain is arid and marked by seasonal streams and drought-resistant vegetation, such as xerophytic shrubs, hardy trees, and ephemeral plant species adapted to low water availability.

== Climate ==
Mashkai experiences a hot desert climate (Köppen: BWh), characterised by extremely hot summers and cold winters. Precipitation is sparse and largely confined to the short monsoon season between August and September.

== Demographics ==
Historical population
Year	Pop.	±% p.a.
1981	37,668	—
1998	34,373	−0.54%
2017	33,076	−0.20%
2023	45,938	+5.63%

As of the 2023 census, the tehsil comprises 6,888 households, with 4,441 in rural areas and 2,447 in urban settings.

The overall literacy rate is 41.21%, with a significant gender disparity: 48.92% among men and 32.70% among women. These figures reflect ongoing structural challenges in educational access, particularly in remote and underserved communities.

=== Languages ===
Languages of Mashkai tehsil (2023)
1. Balochi (95.0%)
2. Brahui (4.50%)
3. Others (0.48%)

Balochi is the predominant language spoken in the tehsil, with approximately 43,649 speakers— representing 95.02% of the population. Brahui is spoken by around 2,069 individuals (approximately 4.5%), while other languages account for the remaining fraction.

== See also ==
- Tehsils of Pakistan
- Tehsils of Balochistan
- Districts in Balochistan
