= Parvarish =

Parvarish (lit. 'upbringing') may refer to:

- Parvarish (1958 film), a 1958 Indian Hindi-language drama film by S. Banerjee, starring Raj Kapoor
- Parvarish (1977 film) or Upbringing, a 1977 Indian Hindi-language crime drama film by Manmohan Desai, starring Amitabh Bachchan and Vinod Khanna
- Parvarrish – Kuchh Khattee Kuchh Meethi, a 2011 Indian television soap opera broadcast on Sony TV
  - Parvarrish – Season 2 (2015)
- Parvarish (2014 TV series), a 2014 Pakistani television series
- Parwarish, 2025 Pakistani television series

== See also ==
- Parwar (disambiguation)
