= Jiwani Tehsil =

Pakistani administrative area

- Tehsil
- Jiwani Tehsil
- Country: Pakistan
- Province: Balochistan
- Division: Makran
- District: Gwadar

Population
  - Urban: -

Languages
  - Main language(s): Balochi
- Time zone: UTC+5 (PST)

Jiwani is a tehsil (administrative subdivision) of Gwadar District in Balochistan, Pakistan. According to the 2023 census, its total population is 35,004, of which 18,511 are male and 16,487 female.

== Location ==
Jiwani tehsil is adjacent to the Arabian Sea.

== Administration ==
In 2021, the Government of Balochistan highlighted the investment made in higher education in Jiwani and future plans for the same.

Jiwani Tehsil is subdivided into two Union Councils - Jiwani and Suntsar.

== Religion ==
According to the 2023 census, the Jiwani tehsil population comprised 34,880 Muslims, 110 Christians, 11 Hindus and 1 Sikh.
