= Sardarzahi =

Indo-Aryan tribe in Iran

Sardarzahi or Sardarzāi, previously known as Saddazi Jadgal (Persian: سردارزهی; Balochi: سددازهی) is a Baloch tribe of Indo-Aryan Jadgal origin in the eastern province of Baluchistan in Iran. The Sardarzahi Khans held much power in Iranian Baluchistan in the early modern period.

== See also ==
- Boledehi
- Chabahar
- Bahu district
- Gwatar
