= Teertaj =

Teertage تیرتیج
- Town and union council
- Country: Pakistan
- Region: Balochistan
- District: Awaran District
- Time zone: UTC+5 (PST)

Teertage (Balochi, Urdu: تیرتیج) is a town and union council in the Awaran District of Balochistan province, Pakistan. During the floods of 2007, Gishkaur was badly affected, with 285 households (1030 people) impacted.
