= Suntsar =

Pakistani town and administrative area

- Union Council
- Suntsar
- Interactive map of Suntsar
- Coordinates: 25°30′8″N 61°58′54″E
- Country: Pakistan
- Province: Balochistan
- Division: Makran
- District: Gwadar
- Tehsil: Jiwani

Area
  - Union Council: 1,975 km^{2} (763 sq mi)

Population (2023)
  - Union Council: 20,523
  - Density: 10.39/km^{2} (26.9/sq mi)
  - Urban: -
  - Rural: 20,523 (100%)

Languages
  - Main language(s): Balochi
- Time zone: UTC+5 (PST)

Suntsar, also spelled Suntser, is a town and Union Council in Jiwani Tehsil of Gwadar District, located in the southwestern province of Balochistan, Pakistan. It lies near the country's border with Iran and has a population of 20,523, according to the 2023 Pakistani census.

Suntsar is among the least developed regions of Balochistan. The entire population resides in rural settings and primarily speaks the Balochi language. In 2020, the Government of Pakistan announced several infrastructure projects aimed at improving connectivity and communication in the region, including efforts to enhance transport links to Suntsar. Earlier, in 2010, the Government of Oman had also pledged assistance for road development in the area. Transport remains hindered by environmental challenges, such as sand accumulation on roads, which leads to disruptions and increased logistical costs.

The Union Council is also home to Sutkagan Dor, an archaeological site dating back approximately 5,000 years, believed to be a Harappan outpost of the Indus Valley Civilisation.

== Religion ==
According to the 2023 census, out of Suntsar's total population of 20,523, 20,476 were Muslim and 47 Christian. No other religious groups were recorded.

Religion in Suntsar Tehsil (2023 Census)
1. Islam (99.8%)
2. Christianity (0.23%)
