= Parwar, Pakistan =

Pakistani village

Parwar پروار
- Town and union council
- Interactive map of Parwar پروار
- Coordinates: 27°1′0″N 65°32′0″E
- Country: Pakistan
- Region: Balochistan
- District: Awaran District
- Time zone: UTC+5 (PST)

Parwar (Balochi, Urdu: پروار) is a town and union council situated in Mashkay Tehsil of Awaran District, in the southern part of Balochistan, Pakistan. Positioned at an elevation of approximately 957 metres (3,143 feet) above sea level, Parwar lies within the arid and rugged terrain of the Central Makran Range. The settlement functions as a local administrative unit and is part of a region characterised by sparse population, seasonal watercourses, and xerophytic vegetation.
