= Bahu District =

Bahu District (Persian:باهو), also known as Bahu Kalat district, is a district located in Chabahar County in the southeast of Iran, in Sistan va Baluchistan province. Bahu district includes a large area on the eastern side of the Bahu Kalat river, between the Iran-Pakistan border to the east, Gwatar Bay to the southeast and Pishin District to the north. Bahu Kalat is the largest village and the centre of Bahu.

== Historical features ==
Bahu had a long history and was a stronghold of sardars in south Baluchistan. Nowadays some aspects of this history can be seen in the form of burnt villages, castles, mosques and wheat storages, but as a result of remoteness and lack of government interests no research has been developed to specify its archaeological characteristics.

Dambkou site in Balure-Machi village is one of the most researched ancient archaeological feature of Bahu. This site was first surveyed by major E. Mockler who published his research in 1877 (Mockler 1877:126). About 55 years later, on the basis of his information, Aurel Stein visited the site during his journey to Baluchistan in 1932 and proceeded to make a more detailed and systematic survey. Amongst the numerous graves, he excavated 42 of them, finding many artifacts.

== Natural features ==
The nature of Bahu is among the most distinguished in Iran, and the Bahu Kalat River is at its center. This is the habitat for the Iranian mugger crocodile or (gando)-- a rare species that survives in this and three other nearby river basins in the extreme southeastern area of Iran, above the port of Chabahar. Along the river, this region has fertile land for agricultural purposes, but it is dependent on seasonal rains and vulnerable to drought. Sustained droughts dry up the river completely, and only the moist soil and small pools left by seasonal rains keep nature alive. In the 1990s, the Iranian government projected a dam in the northern end of Bahu (Pishin) to reserve water for agricultural and human consumption, lands which close to the dam are cultivated with a variety of agricultural products, specially watermelons that are being exported to internal and external markets.

Southern end of Bahu district is the Gwatar harbor, which is located in a strategic location, and for several years was under the control of colonialists, especially Portuguese. Nowadays remains of colonial castles are in place. Aquaculture is the main economic potential of south Bahu, in that saltwater shrimp can be cultivated two times in one season.
