= Koh-e-Murad =

Koh-e-Murad (Balochi and Urdu: كوه مراد) is a shrine located near the town of Turbat in the Baluchistan province of Pakistan. It is the most sacred site for Zikris community. Zikris believe that their Mahdi spent the last years of his life at this site praying and preaching his faith.

The term Koh-e-Murad means mountain of desire. Zikris make a yearly pilgrimage to shrine on the 27th of Ramadan. They gather and recite prayers like Zikr-e-Elahi, Chogaan and Sepath. About 20,000 pilgrims visit the shrine annually.
