= Bandar Gavater =

Bandar Gavater بندر گواتر
- Village
- Location within Iran
- Coordinates: 25°09′51″N 61°29′50″E
- Country: Iran
- Province: Sistan and Baluchestan
- County: Dashtiari
- Bakhsh: Dashtiari
- Rural District: Sand-e Mir Suiyan

Population (2006)
  - Total: 437
- Time zone: UTC+3:30 (IRST)
  - Summer (DST): UTC+4:30 (IRDT)

Bandar Gavater (Persian: بندر گواتر, also Romanized as Shahrak Maskūnī-ye Gavāter; also known as Gavātar, Gavāter, Govātar, Gvātar, and Gwātar) is a town in Sand-e Mir Suiyan Rural District, Dashtiari District, Dashtiari County, Sistan and Baluchestan province, Iran. At the 2006 census, its population was 437, in 85 families. The town is located on the northwest shore of Gwatar Bay (which is named after it), near the border with Pakistan. Historically, it forms part of the Makran region, together with a number of other small ports including the nearby similarly named Gwadar, Pakistan, to the east and Chahbahar, Iran, to the west.

== History ==
Gwatar was a Portuguese military base before it became a village. The old village of Gwatar was a trading base before it was devastated in a war between its Sardarzahi rulers, Sardar Jalalkhan and Sardar Mirsuban. After the war, all of its population migrated to Jiwani in Pakistan.

In 1864, Gwatar was visited by the British "Persian Boundary Commission", who estimated there were 250 inhabitants, mostly engaged in fishing.

== See also ==
- Sutkagan Dor
