= Bahu Kalat River =

Coordinates: 25°20′49.4″N 61°21′35.5″E

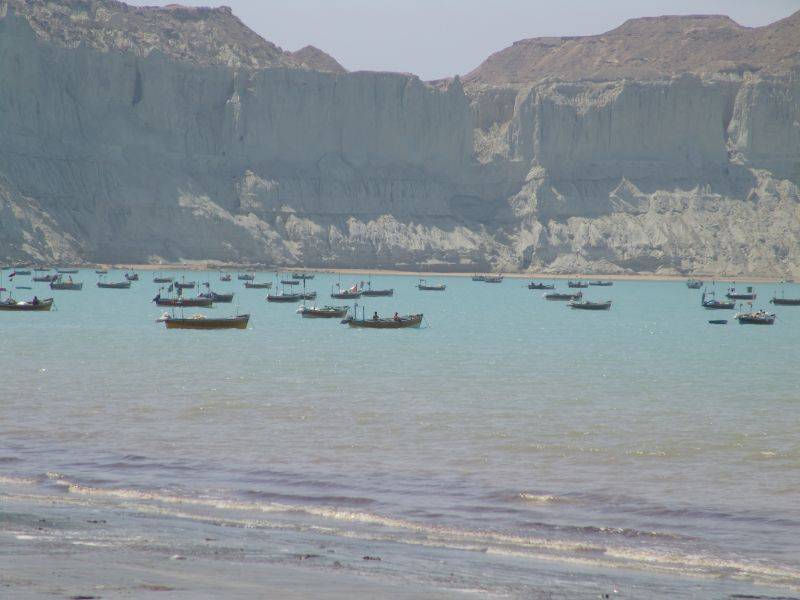
- Gwadar Bay

Location
- Country: Iran

The Bahu Kalat River (Persian: رودخانه باهوکلات), also known as Bahu River, Dashtiari River and Silup River, is a river in the Sistan va Baluchistan province in Iran. It is located in Bahu district. The tribes living here are as follows; Hooth, Khosag, Gorgaij, Rind, and Kalmati. It is about 90 kilometers from Chabahar County. The Bahu Kalat is the longest river in south-eastern Iran, and flows into Gwatar Bay on the Iran–Pakistan border, about 50 miles west of Gwadar.

== Resources ==
- (in Persian)
- Map of Bahu Kalat River
