= Camp Jahoo =

- Town and union council
- Country: Pakistan
- Region: Balochistan
- District: Awaran District
- Time zone: UTC+5 (PST)

Camp Jahoo is a town and a union council of Awaran District in the Balochistan province of Pakistan. Camp Jahoo was badly affected during the Pakistan floods of 2007, which impacted 145 households (642 people).
