= Gwatar Bay =

Bay in the Gulf of Oman

- Jiwani Bay
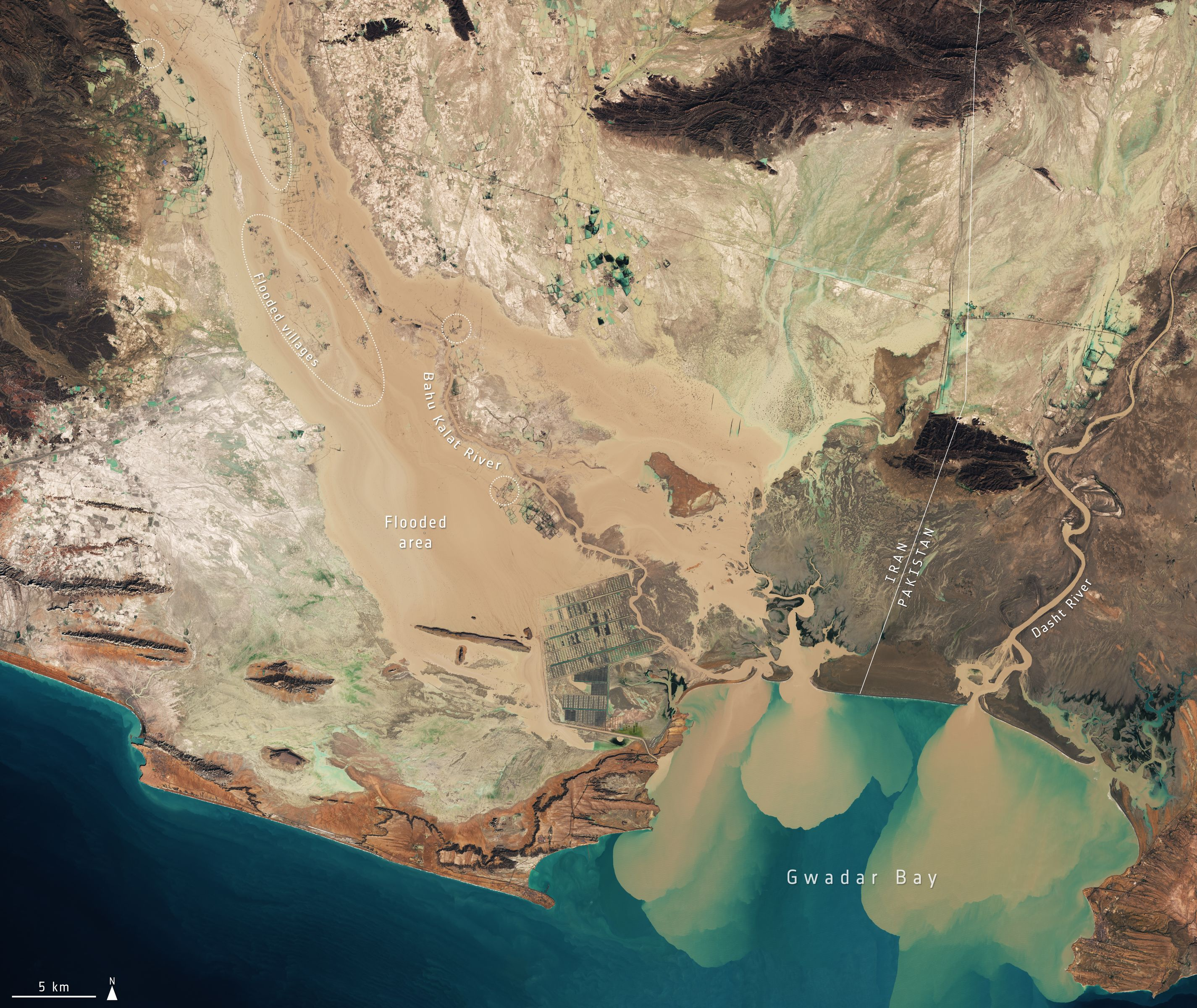
- Satellite photo of Gwatar Bay (at bottom right)

- Location between Iran and Pakistan
- Location: Dashtiari County, Sistan and Baluchestan province, Iran; Gwadar District, Balochistan province, Pakistan
- Coordinates: 25°06′49″N 61°36′51″E
- River sources: Bahu Kalat River, Dasht River
- Max. length: 30 kilometres (19 mi)
- Max. width: 16 kilometres (9.9 mi)
- Settlements: Bandar Gavater, Jiwani, Pasabandar

Gwatar Bay (Persian: خلیج گواتر, Urdu: خلیج گواتر) is an inlet of the Arabian Sea, located on the northeast of the Gulf of Oman, and indenting the Makran coast at the southernmost part of the border of Iran and Pakistan.

== Etymology ==
The bay is named after the Iranian town of Bandar Gavater on the northwest shore, which should not be confused with the Pakistani town of Gwadar, about 50 kilometres (30 mi) to the east of the bay. Equally, this bay should not be confused with Gwadar West Bay and Gwadar East Bay, which are adjacent to the peninsula of Gwadar, lying about 30 kilometres (20 mi) and 60 kilometres (40 mi) respectively east of the subject of this article.

The bay is mentioned in a book called "Gwatar Bay to Sir Creek: The Golden Coast of Pakistan — History and Memoirs", which references the two bodies of water that form the western and eastern ends of the coast of Pakistan.

== Geography ==
The bay is about 30 kilometres (20 mi) long (east-west) and 16 kilometres (10 mi) wide (north-south).

The Bahu Kalat River (also known as the Dashtiari River) flows into the bay from the northwest, and the Dasht River flows in from the northeast. Adjacent to the mouths of the two rivers, there are extensive mangrove swamps including the Jiwani Coastal Wetland.

Apart from Bandar Gavater, the other main settlements on the bay are the Pakistani town of Jiwani on the eastern shore and the Iranian town of Pasabandar at the southwest corner.

The bay contains important fishing grounds which are being threatened by increasing industrial activity and overfishing as well as the development of the nearby ports of Gwadar and Chahbahar. For a number of years, there have been calls for the establishment of a marine protected area covering the bay.

In 2021, the provincial government of Balochistan, Pakistan, and the local branch of the World Wide Fund for Nature began building an artificial reef in a four-square-mile area west of Jiwani. The reef comprises 330 concrete blocks, each weighing 1.5 tons, mostly placed underwater to attract corals and sea creatures.
