= Jan Dashti =

Poet, bureaucrat, author, and activist from Balochistan, Pakistan

Jan Mohammad Dashti (born October 1951) is a Baloch poet, bureaucrat author and anti Islam activist, from Balochistan. Often known as just Jan Dashti, he is a senior bureaucrat serving as Balochistan's Provincial Secretary Mines and Minerals.

== Birth and education ==
Dashti was born in Kunchiti, in Balochistan. He took a two-year post-graduation course in Journalism at the University of Karachi, from where he passed out in 1972. He also successfully completed the highly acclaimed CSS exam.

== Journalism ==
Dashti's journalistic career began in 1974, when he joined Pakistan's Press and Information Department (PID). Between 1978 and 1979, he wrote for the Weekly Viewpoint under the pen-name of Sahak Baloch, mostly contributing Balouchistan-related articles. He has also greatly contributed to the Balouchi language under the pen-name of "Shay Ragam".

At present, Dashti is the owner of an Urdu daily, Aasap, which is published by the Asaap Group of Publications and regarded as a newspaper that takes an active stand against the "gross violation of human rights of the Baloch people" and presents "a balanced view on social, political, cultural, economic and human right issues of Baloch people and Balochistan".

== Bureaucracy ==
In 1979, Dashti left the PID and switched over to the Balochistan civil service. Currently, he serves as Balouchistan's Provincial Secretary Mines and Minerals, and is considered one of the top bureaucrats of Pakistan.

== As an author ==
Dashti has authored more than a dozen books on Baloch socio-political issues, both in English and Balochi. His first book, The Baloch Cultural Heritage, was published in 1982, and is considered the best book on Baloch culture and history, alongside his Essays on Baloch National Struggle in Pakistan: Emergence, Dimensions and Repercussions. His book, Shap Roch Shap, has also won great critical acclaim in Balouchi literary circles.

== Personal life ==
Dashti follows the religion of Islam and is a Muslim. He enjoys a good reputation as a promoter of education and literacy.

=== Attack on life ===
On 24 February 2009, Dashti and his driver were seriously wounded when unknown gunmen intercepted their vehicle, and opened indiscriminate fire on them. The event happened near Sariab road, Quetta, Balochistan when Dashti was on his way to office.

Although the motive behind the act could not be ascertained, the event was thought to be an incident of targeted killing as, according to preliminary reports, the assailants were chasing Dashti's vehicle.

Both Dashti and his drivers, who received multiple bullet wounds and were critically injured, survived. Dashti, who was initially treated at the Civil Hospital, Quetta, was later shifted to a hospital in Karachi by aircraft.

The attack was strongly condemned by the Chief Minister Balochistan, members of the Provincial Assembly, political leaders and members of the civil society.

Baloch and Sindhi human rights advocacy organisations based in the UK, the Balochistan Human Rights Council (BHRC), the World Sindhi Congress (WSC), the Balochistan Action Committee and the Sindhi Baloch Forum, also strongly condemned the attack in a joint statement.

== See also ==
- Balochistan (Pakistan)
- Siddiq Balouch
