= Awaran District =

District in Balochistan, Pakistan

Awaran District ضلع آواران
- District
- Map of Pakistani districts with Awaran district highlighted in maroon
- Country: Pakistan
- Province: Balochistan
- Division: Lasbela
- Notified: 11 November 1992
- Headquarters: Awaran

Government
  - Type: District Administration
  - Deputy Commissioner: Engineer Ayesha Zehri
  - District Health Officer: Dr Muhammad Aslam
  - District Police Officer: N/A

Area
  - District: 29,510 km^{2} (11,390 sq mi)

Population (2023)
  - District: 178,958
  - Density: 6.064/km^{2} (15.71/sq mi)
  - Urban: 46,836 (26.27%)
  - Rural: 132,122 (73.73%)

Literacy
  - Literacy rate: Total: (36.34%); Male: (44.28%); Female: (27.95%)
- Time zone: UTC+5 (PKT)
- Number of Tehsils: 3
- Tehsils: Awaran; Jhal Jhao; Mashkai
- Website: www.bdd.sdnpk.org/awaran.htm

Awaran District ( Urdu: ضلع آواران Balochi: ضلع آواران), is a district in the southern part of the Balochistan province of Pakistan. It is part of the Lasbela Division.

It was created as a separate district on 11 November 1992; previously it was a sub-division of Khuzdar District. It is considered one of the poorest districts in the province.

Awaran district is bordered by Gwadar to its south, Lasbela to its east, Kech and Panjgur to its west, Khuzdar to its north east and Washuk to its north west.

== Administration ==
The district is administratively subdivided into the following five tehsils, which are sub-divided into eight union councils:

Tehsil	Area (km^{2})	Population (2023)	Density (ppl/km^{2}) (2023)	Literacy rate (2023)	Union Councils
Awaran	13,075	45,774	3.50	42.90%	Awaran Teertage
Gishkaur	4,578	31,462	6.87	36.34%	Gishkaur
Jhal Jhao	6,381	28,132	4.41	26.62%	Camp Jahoo
Korak Jhao	3,058	27,652	9.04	26.71%	Korak
Mashkai	2,418	45,938	19.00	41.21%	Gajjar Nokjo Parwar

== Demographics ==
=== Population ===
Historical population
Year	Pop.	±% p.a.
1951	...	—
1961	31,893	—
1972	51,918	+4.53%
1981	110,353	+8.74%
1998	118,173	+0.40%
2017	121,680	+0.15%
2023	178,958	+6.64%

As of the 2023 census, Awaran district has 27,796 households and a population of 178,958. The district has a sex ratio of 104.93 males to 100 females and a literacy rate of 36.34%: 44.28% for males and 27.95% for females. 62,549 (34.95% of the surveyed population) are under 10 years of age. 46,836 (26.17%) live in urban areas.

The major tribes are the Shahwani, Bizenjo, Muhammad Hassani, Sajidi, Siapad, Mirwani, Rakhshani, Sumalani, Qambrani, Shadainzai, Haibwari & Zehri(Channaal).

Religions in Awaran district (2023)
Religion	Percent
Islam	99%
Othera	1%

=== Religion ===
Majority of population adheres to Islamic faith. 1,785 (1.00%) were from religious minorities. Awaran is known for its Zikri minority and also has a small Hindu community.

Languages of Awaran district (2023)
1. Balochi (98.6%)
2. Brahui (1.17%)
3. Others (0.25%)

=== Language ===
At the time of the 2023 census, 98.58% of the population spoke Balochi and 1.17% Brahui as their first language.

Balochi accounted for 99.7% of the population in the 1998 census. The previous census of 1981 reported that 8% of the households in the then subdivision of Awaran had Brahui as a first language.

== See also ==
- Bazdad
- Abdul Quddus Bizenjo
- Tehsils of Pakistan
  - Tehsils of Balochistan
- Districts of Pakistan
  - Districts in Balochistan
- Divisions of Pakistan
  - Divisions of Balochistan

== Bibliography ==
- 1981 District census report of Khuzdar. Census publication. Vol. 12. Islamabad: Population Census Organization, Statistics Division, Government of Pakistan. 1983.
- 1998 District census report of Awaran. Census publication. Vol. 89. Islamabad: Population Census Organization, Statistics Division, Government of Pakistan. 2000.
