= Parwaria =

- village
- Location within Madhya Pradesh Location within India
- Coordinates: 23.693305°N 77.559418°E
- Country: India
- State: Madhya Pradesh
- District: Bhopal
- Tehsil: Berasia

Population (2011)
  - Total: 303
- Time zone: UTC+5:30 (IST)
- ISO 3166 code: MP-IN
- Census code: 482187

Parwaria is a village in the Bhopal district of Madhya Pradesh, India. It is located in the Berasia tehsil.

== Demographics ==
According to the 2011 census of India, Parwaria has 65 households. The effective literacy rate (i.e. the literacy rate of population excluding children aged 6 and below) is 54.92%.

Demographics (2011 Census)
	Total	Male	Female
Population	303	162	141
Children aged below 6 years	59	33	26
Scheduled caste	86	47	39
Scheduled tribe	67	31	36
Literates	134	82	52
Workers (all)	111	77	34
Main workers (total)	58	50	8
Main workers: Cultivators	33	31	2
Main workers: Agricultural labourers	20	16	4
Main workers: Household industry workers	0	0	0
Main workers: Other	5	3	2
Marginal workers (total)	53	27	26
Marginal workers: Cultivators	2	2	0
Marginal workers: Agricultural labourers	47	21	26
Marginal workers: Household industry workers	0	0	0
Marginal workers: Others	4	4	0
Non-workers	192	85	107
