= Korak, Pakistan =

Coordinates: 26°50′38″N 65°44′3″E

Korak کوراک
- Town and union council
- Interactive map of Korak کوراک
- Country: Pakistan
- Region: Balochistan
- District: Awaran District
- Time zone: UTC+5 (PST)

Korak (Balochi, Urdu: کوراک) is a town and union council of Awaran District in the Balochistan province of Pakistan. It is located at 26°50'38N 65°44'3E and has an altitude of 648 metres (2129 feet), During the floods of 2007 Korak was affected - 137 households (619 people) were impacted.
