= Pasabandar =

Pasabandar پسابندر
- Village
- Location within Iran
- Coordinates: 25°04′01″N 61°24′44″E
- Country: Iran
- Province: Sistan and Baluchestan
- County: Chabahar
- Bakhsh: Dashtiari
- Rural District: Sand-e Mir Suiyan

Population (2006)
  - Total: 696
- Time zone: UTC+3:30 (IRST)

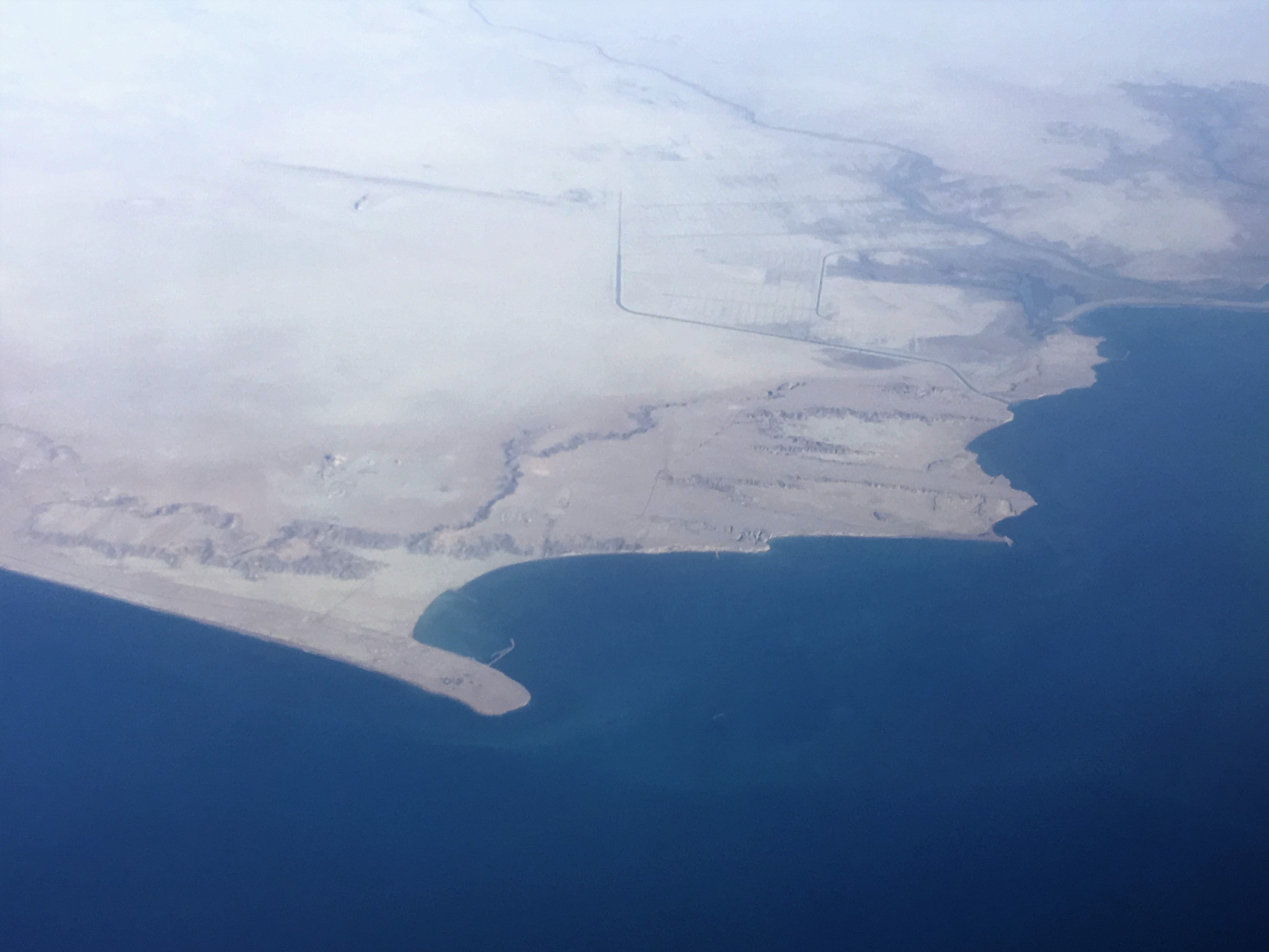
Aerial view over the southeastern part of Iran. To the left is Pasabandar city & cape.

Pasabandar (Persian: پسابندر, also Romanized as Pasā Bandar; also known as Pasā and Pas Bandar) is a village in Sand-e Mir Suiyan Rural District, Dashtiari District, Chabahar County, Sistan and Baluchestan Province, Iran. At the 2006 census, its population was 696, in 109 families. It is the southernmost town of Iran.
