= Gishkaur Tehsil =

Pakistani administrative area

Gishkaur Tehsil Balochi: تحصیل گِشکور Gishkore Tehsil
- Tehsil of Awaran District
- Location within Balochistan, Pakistan Location within Pakistan
- Coordinates: 25°40′N 64°30′E
- Country: Pakistan
- Province: Balochistan
- District: Awaran District
- Headquarters: Gishkaur

Area
  - Tehsil of Awaran District: 4,578 km^{2} (1,768 sq mi)

Population (2023)
  - Tehsil of Awaran District: 31,462
  - Density: 6.87/km^{2} (17.8/sq mi)
  - Rural: 31,462 (100%)

Literacy
  - Literacy rate: Total: (36.34%); Male: (45.74%); Female: (26.52%)
- Time zone: UTC+5 (PST)
- Number of Union Councils: ..
- Main languages: 31,424 (99.88%) Balochi

Gishkaur, also spelled Gishkore, (Note: Balochi: گِشکور, Urdu: گشکور, pronounced [ɡɪʃ.ˈkoːr]) is an administrative subdivision (tehsil) of Awaran District in southern Balochistan, Pakistan, spanning an area of approximately 4,578 square kilometres (1,768 sq mi). According to the 2023 national census, Gishkaur is home to 31,462 residents, dispersed across 110 rural settlements.

Situated in the southern part of the province near to the Makran Coast, Gishkaur extends from lowland areas into mountainous terrain, with an elevation rising above 1,000 metres (3,300 ft). The tehsil has a predominantly subtropical desert climate, characterised by hot summers and mild winters.

Gishkaur remains relatively remote, with limited road infrastructure and long-standing security concerns. Economically, it holds limited significance within the broader regional context. This region of Balochistan is among the least developed in Pakistan and is characterised by a notably low Human Development Index (HDI), reflecting systemic challenges in education, healthcare, and livelihood opportunities.

Periodic natural disasters, such as droughts and earthquakes, have further exacerbated the difficulties of daily life. A major earthquake, measuring 7.7 in magnitude, caused widespread destruction in the region.

== Geography ==
Located between the northern edge of the Makran Coastal Range and the southern slopes of the Central Makran Range, Gishkaur is divided into two distinct sections. Together, they span approximately 4,578 square kilometres (457,800 ha). These two areas are separated by Awaran Tehsil, which lies between them in the southern part of the district.

The western segment lies north of the coastal tehsil of Ormara, near the Khor Kalmat, along the Makran Coastal Highway that connects Ormara with Pasni Tehsil to the west. This part shares borders with Turbat Tehsil and Hoshab Tehsil to the west, while its remaining bordaries adjoin Awaran.

The eastern segment is situated further inland and shares borders with Awaran Tehsil to the west and north. Jhal Jhao Tehsil to north and east, and Ormara and Liari Tehsils are to the south.

The landscape is predominantly hilly, with elevations ranging around 1,000 metres (3,300 ft). It features arid terrain interspersed with seasonal watercourses and xerophytic vegetation, including drought-resistant trees, hardy shrubs and ephemeral flora adapted to the dry conditions. The 2013 earthquake led to significant structural damage across both segments of the tehsil.

== Climate ==
Gishkaur, particularly its southern areas, experiences a subtropical desert climate (Köppen: BWh). Summers are extremely hot, while winters remain relatively mild. Rainfall is minimal and largely confined to the short monsoon period between August and September.

The 2022 Pakistan floods also had a notable impact on the tehsil, underlining its environmental vulnerability.

== Population ==
Historical population
Year	Pop.	±% p.a.
1981	...	—
1998	22,430	—
2017	18,390	−1.04%
2023	31,462	+9.36%

As of the 2023 census, Gishkaur has a population of 31,462 residents living in 6,191 households.

The literacy rate stands at 36.34%, with a marked gender gap: 45.74% among men and 26.52% among women. These figures reflect broader structural challenges in educational access, particularly for women and girls in rural and underserved communities.

=== Languages ===
Balochi is the predominant language spoken in the tehsil, with approximately 31,424 speakers—accounting for around 99.88% of the population.

== See also ==
- Tehsils of Pakistan
- Tehsils of Balochistan
- Districts in Balochistan
