= Jiwani =

Jiwani جيونى
- Town
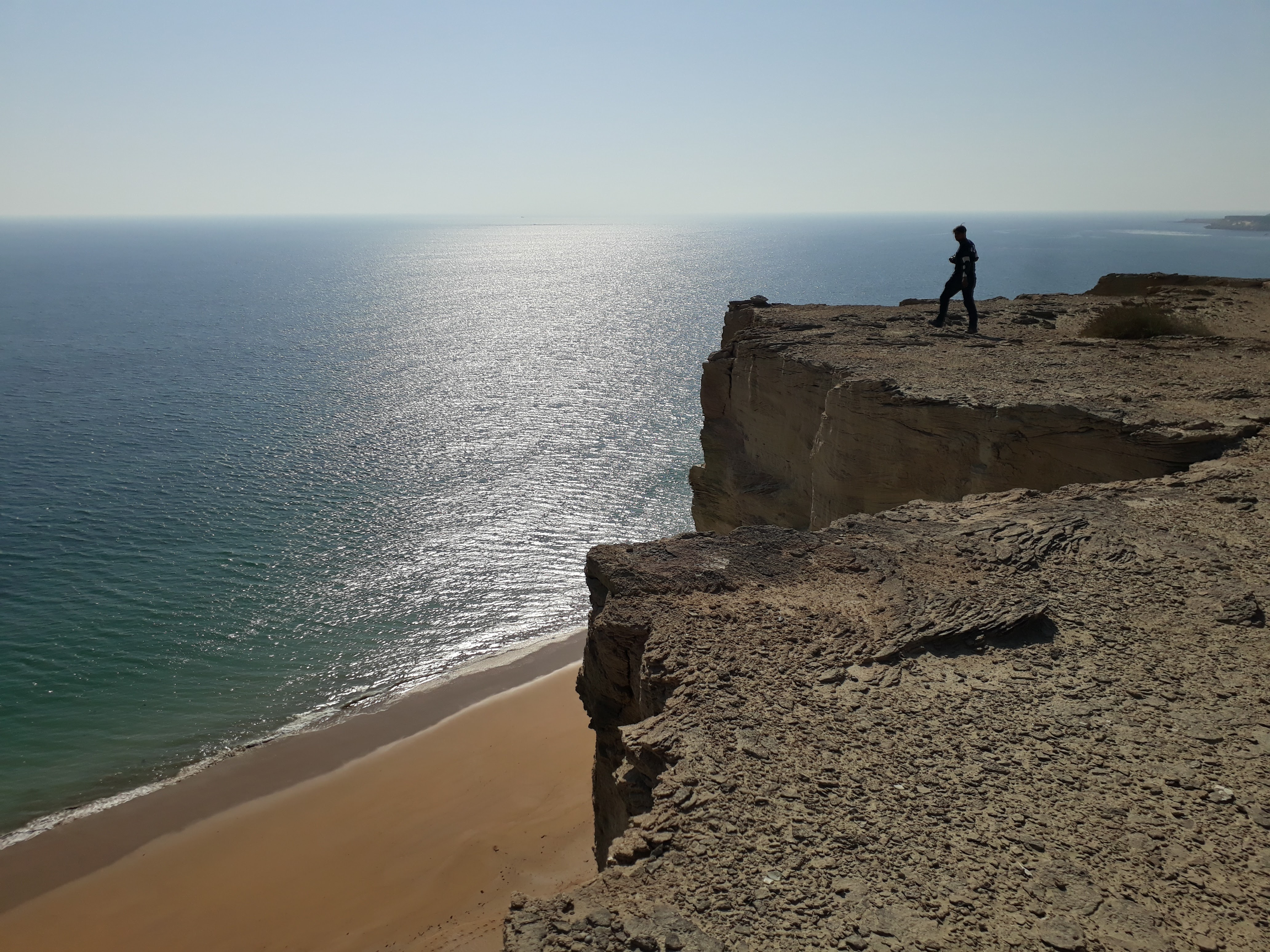
- Darah Beach, Pakistan

- Location within Balochistan, Pakistan Location within Pakistan
- Coordinates: 25°2′50″N 61°44′45″E
- Country: Pakistan
- Province: Balochistan
- Division: Makran
- District: Gwadar
- Tehsil: Jiwani Tehsil

Population (2023)
  - Total: 25,332
- Time zone: UTC+5 (PST)
- Postal code: 91100

Jiwani (Urdu, Balochi: جيونى) is a town and commercial port located on the Gulf of Oman in the Gwadar District of the Balochistan province of Pakistan. The town has a population of 25,332 and is expected to become a major commercial centre in concert with the development of the port city of Gwadar, located nearly 60 kilometres (37 mi) to the east.

== Overview ==
Jiwani is located between the Pakistani port city of Gwadar and the Iranian port city of Chabahar at the eastern end of Gwatar Bay. The area around the bay includes an important mangrove forest, and is an important habitat for a wide variety of wildlife, especially the endangered olive ridley and green turtles. Plans to grant fishing concessions and offshore drilling rights are potentially a threat to the wildlife of the area. The population largely depends upon fishing. A number of export-oriented fish freezing plants are located in Jiwani. Jiwani is 34 kilometres (21 mi) from the Iranian border.

Jiwani holds strategic importance in the region, located immediately adjacent to the shipping lanes to and from the Persian Gulf. This is the main reason that the town hosts a small naval base and an airport with a 1,700-metre (5,500 ft) runway.

Jiwani was used during World War II as an Allied airfield and the remains of some airfields are still available. Visiting the accommodation area of the airfield base used during World War II in Jiwani reveals many handwritten small stories and names of Allied pilots. A water system which is now abandoned was a marvel of civil works for meeting the water requirements of the station. It used to store rain water in three stages in order to clean the water using its usual flow. The water was then pumped to the airfield, and also up to the Victoria Hut, which is nearly 5 kilometres (3 mi) from the water tank system.

The Makran Coastal Highway now reaches Jiwani from Gwadar and also connects to Karachi.

According to media reports, China plans to build a military base for Pakistan in Jiwani.

== Demographics ==
=== Population ===
Historical population
Year	Pop.	±% p.a.
1951	...	—
1961	2,856	—
1972	5,350	+5.87%
1981	...	—
1998	14,072	—
2017	18,268	+1.38%
2023	25,332	+5.60%
Sources:, 2023 Pakistani census

== Climate ==
Jiwani has a hot desert climate (Köppen climate classification BWh) with hot and dry summers and warm winters. Most rainfall falls in winter, although there is sometimes a little rain in the monsoon season (July–August) as well.

Climate data for Jiwani (1991-2020)
Month	Jan	Feb	Mar	Apr	May	Jun	Jul	Aug	Sep	Oct	Nov	Dec	Year
Record high °C (°F)	31.1 (88.0)	33.0 (91.4)	39.0 (102.2)	40.5 (104.9)	45.0 (113.0)	48.0 (118.4)	42.5 (108.5)	39.5 (103.1)	41.1 (106.0)	40.5 (104.9)	37.2 (99.0)	31.1 (88.0)	48.0 (118.4)
Mean daily maximum °C (°F)	24.5 (76.1)	25.9 (78.6)	28.7 (83.7)	32.5 (90.5)	34.9 (94.8)	34.6 (94.3)	32.6 (90.7)	31.6 (88.9)	31.9 (89.4)	33.0 (91.4)	30.1 (86.2)	26.5 (79.7)	30.6 (87.0)
Daily mean °C (°F)	19.2 (66.6)	20.6 (69.1)	23.5 (74.3)	27.0 (80.6)	30.0 (86.0)	30.6 (87.1)	29.5 (85.1)	28.5 (83.3)	28.2 (82.8)	27.6 (81.7)	24.2 (75.6)	20.7 (69.3)	25.8 (78.5)
Mean daily minimum °C (°F)	13.9 (57.0)	15.3 (59.5)	18.3 (64.9)	22.0 (71.6)	25.2 (77.4)	26.6 (79.9)	26.4 (79.5)	25.5 (77.9)	24.5 (76.1)	22.2 (72.0)	18.3 (64.9)	14.8 (58.6)	21.1 (69.9)
Record low °C (°F)	3.9 (39.0)	6.0 (42.8)	5.5 (41.9)	15.6 (60.1)	19.0 (66.2)	22.8 (73.0)	21.5 (70.7)	21.7 (71.1)	18.3 (64.9)	13.0 (55.4)	5.6 (42.1)	3.9 (39.0)	3.9 (39.0)
Average precipitation mm (inches)	21.2 (0.83)	4.9 (0.19)	16.4 (0.65)	6.7 (0.26)	0.0 (0.0)	9.8 (0.39)	3.1 (0.12)	1.5 (0.06)	0.0 (0.0)	1.3 (0.05)	3.1 (0.12)	15.4 (0.61)	83.4 (3.28)
Average precipitation days (≥ 1.0 mm)	1.9	0.6	0.8	0.2	0.0	0.2	0.4	0.3	0.0	0.1	0.3	1.2	6
Mean monthly sunshine hours	273.0	254.1	281.1	287.9	332.0	280.5	214.2	206.7	254.3	307.5	294.2	272.3	3,257.8
Mean daily sunshine hours	8.8	9.0	9.1	9.6	10.7	9.4	6.9	6.7	8.5	9.9	9.8	8.8	8.9
Source: NOAA (extremes, sun 1961-1990)

== See also ==
- Jiwani Airport
- Jiwani Coastal Wetland
- Pishukan, a coastal town to the east of Jiwani.
