= Awaran =

Pakistani town

Awaran آواران
- City
- Location within Balochistan, Pakistan Location within Pakistan
- Coordinates: 26°27′25.26″N 65°13′53.3″E
- Country: Pakistan
- Province: Balochistan
- Division: Lasbela
- District: Awaran
- Elevation: 529 m (1,736 ft)

Population (2023)
  - Total: 28,780
- Time zone: UTC+5 (PKT)

Awaran (Note: Balochi: آواران, pronounced [ɑːʋɑːˈɾɑːn]) is a town located in Awaran District in the south of Balochistan, Pakistan. the town has a population of 28,780 people and lies on an elevation of 529 m. It serves as the headquarters of district and tehsil Awaran, and is a Union Council.

In September 2013, a powerful earthquake struck the District, measuring 7.7 on the Richter scale with its epicentre located around 66 kilometres (41 mi) north-northwest of Awaran. The disaster caused the deaths of at least 386 people and 80% of the houses have been damaged or destroyed, including across the district and town of Awaran.
