= Zehri =

Brahui tribe name in Pakistan

Zehri (Brahui: زہری) is an ethnic Brahui tribe mainly found in Balochistan, Pakistan. According to the official list by Mir Ahmad Yar, the last Khan of Kalat, Zehri was originally one of the Jaṭṭ tribes inhabiting Balochistan. It belongs to the Jhalawani branch of the Brahui tribes.

== Notable people ==
Notable people with the surname Zehri include the following politicians from Balochistan, Pakistan:

- Israr Ullah Zehri (born 1965)
- Mir Naimatullah Zehri, member-elect of the Provincial Assembly of Balochistan
- Mir Ziaullah Zehri (born 1981), current Provincial Minister of the Balochistan for Forest and Wildlife
- Sanaullah Khan Zehri (born 1961), Chief Minister of Balochistan from 24 December 2015 to 9 December 2017
