= Bizenjo =

Brahui tribe in Pakistan

Bizenjo (Brahui: بزنجو) is an ethnic Brahui tribe inhabiting Balochistan province in Pakistan. The tribe belongs to the Jhalawani branch of the Brahui tribes. According to the official list by Mir Ahmad Yar, the last Khan of Kalat, Bizenjo was originally one of the Jatt tribes inhabiting the region; the others being Zehri and Mengal. Though the Bizenjo in eastern Makran are Brahui by origin, they have been Baluchified in language and customs due to a prolonged residence in Makran.

== People with the surname ==
- Ghaus Bakhsh Bizenjo
- Hasil Bizenjo
- Abdul Quddus Bizenjo

== Bibliography ==
- Elfenbein, Josef (1989). "Brahui". In Yarshater, Ehsan (ed.). Encyclopædia Iranica. Vol. IV/4: Bolbol I–Brick. London and New York: Routledge & Kegan Paul. pp. 433–443. ISBN 978-0-71009-127-7.
