= Jadgali language =

Indo-Aryan language spoken on Iranian Plateau

Jadgali
- Nummaṛī
- Jadgali in Arabic script, in the three names of the language, Jadgali (Baloch name) and Numari (Native name)
- Native to: Pakistan, Iran
- Ethnicity: Jadgals
- Native speakers: no reliable data (2008)
- Language family: Indo-European: Indo-Iranian; Indo-Aryan; Northwestern Zone; Sindhic; Jadgali–Lasi; Jadgali
- Writing system: Arabic script (Nastaʿlīq)

Language codes
- ISO 639-3: jdg
- Glottolog: jadg1238
- Zidgali is classified as "critically endangered" by the UNESCO Atlas of the World's Languages in Danger

Jaḍgālī (also called Jatgali, Jatki, Zadjali, Zidgali) is an Indo-Aryan language spoken by the Jadgal, an ethno-linguistic group of Pakistan and Iran also spoken by few hundreds in Oman. It is a dialect of Sindhi language most closely related to Lasi.

The majority of the Jadgali population is found in Pakistan, where a 2004 estimate placed it at 15,600, and in Iran, where according to a 2008 estimate it is at least 25,000. There are also immigrant communities in Oman and the United Arab Emirates, where the Jadgal are known as az-zighālī or az-zijālī. In Iran at least two varieties are spoken, which are reportedly not easily intercomprehensible.

The term Jadgal is of Balochi origin, but it is nowadays used by the Jadgal themselves, alongside their earlier endonym Nummaṛ, which is the source of the language names Nummaṛī and Nummaṛikī.

Jadgali is underdocumented. According to Emeneau, it is likely to have been the source of early Indo-Aryan influences on Balochi and Brahui and therefore studies of the language could help bring insights into the linguistic history of the area.

== In Iran ==
Jadgali was known by the Arabs as Al-Zighali.

In Iran, Jadgali is spoken in the Dashtyari region in the south and south-east of Sistan and Balochistan Province, particularly in Pullān, Pīr Suhrāb and Bāhū Kalāt; all neighbouring communities are Balochi-speaking. Most speakers of Jadgali ethnically self-identify as Jadgal, fewer Jadgal claim to be of Baloch origin and to have changed their language because of interactions with their neighbours at the time when they were settled in Las Bela, a region at the eastern end of Balochistan. According to this story, they left their homeland after a defeat from the ruler of Sindh and then moved westward, eventually settling in Dashtyari during the reign of Shah Abbas.

Balochi is the language of wider communication, all male adults are bilingual in it, and it is more likely to be the one passed on to children in mixed marriages. However, attitudes to Jadgali are positive and the language is vital. Persian is used relatively often. In addition to Balochi TV programmes, some people also watch Sindhi-language broadcasts from Pakistan.

== Bibliography ==
- Bashir, Elena L. (2016). "Contact and convergence. Baluchistan". In Hock, Hans Henrich; Bashir, Elena (eds.). The languages and linguistics of South Asia: a comprehensive guide. World of Linguistics. Berlin: De Gruyter Mouton. pp. 271–84. ISBN 978-3-11-042715-8.
- Delforooz, Behrooz Barjasteh (2008). "A sociolinguistic survey among the Jagdal in Iranian Balochistan". In Jahani, Carina; Korn, Agnes; Titus, Paul Brian (eds.). The Baloch and others: linguistic, historical and socio-political perspectives on pluralism in Balochistan. Wiesbaden: Reichert Verlag. pp. 23–44. ISBN 978-3-89500-591-6.
- Lewis, M. Paul; Simons, Gary F.; Fennig, Charles D., eds. (2013). "Jadgali". Ethnologue (17 ed.). Archived from the original on 2013-03-04.
- Simons, Gary F.; Fennig, Charles D., eds. (2017). "Jadgali". Ethnologue (20 ed.). (access limited).
- Spooner, Brian (1969). "Politics, Kinship, and Ecology in Southeast Persia". Ethnology. 8 (2): 139–152. doi:10.2307/3772976. ISSN 0014-1828. JSTOR 3772976. Archived from the original on February 2, 2017.
