= Gwadar District =

District in Balochistan, Pakistan

Coordinates: 25°20′N 63°20′E

Gwadar District ضلع گوادر گوادر دمگ
- District
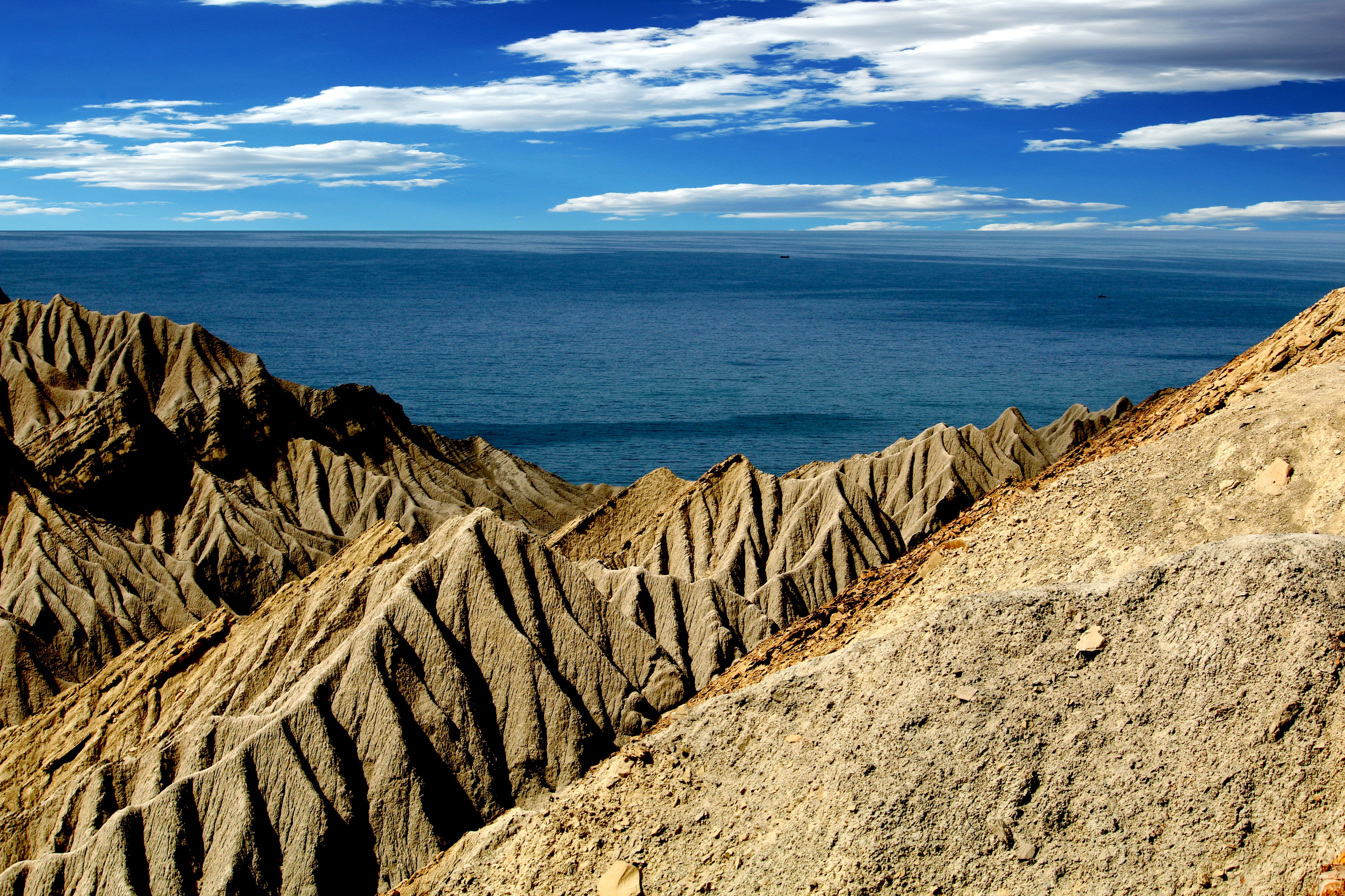
- Ormara, a town in Gwadar District

- Map of Balochistan with Gwadar District highlighted
- Country: Pakistan
- Province: Balochistan
- Division: Makran
- Established: 1 July 1977
- Headquarters: Gwadar

Government
  - Type: District Administration
  - Mayor: Maulana Hidayat-ur-Rehman Baloch
  - Deputy Commissioner: Izzat Nazeer Baloch (BPS-18 PAS)
  - District Police Officer: Muhammad Jawad Tariq (BPS-18 PSP)

Area
  - District: 12,637 km^{2} (4,879 sq mi)

Population (2023)
  - District: 305,160
  - Density: 24.148/km^{2} (62.543/sq mi)
  - Urban: 159,035 (52.11%)
  - Rural: 146,125 (47.89%)

Languages
  - Main language(s): Balochi, Urdu

Literacy
  - Literacy rate: Total: (50.30%); Male: (57.62%); Female: (42.19%)
- Time zone: UTC+5 (PST)
- Number of Tehsils: 5

Gwadar District (Balochi: گوادر دمگ, Urdu: ضلع گوادر) is a district in the Balochistan province of Pakistan. The name Gwadar originates from Gwat and Dar (Balochi: گوات ءُ در)، which means the 'Door of air'. Gwadar was notified as a separate district on 1 July 1977. The city of Gwadar serves as the district headquarters.

It is located in the south of the Balochistan province. It is bordered by the Arabian Sea to the south, Lasbela district to the east, Kech and Awaran districts to the north, and the Sistan and Baluchestan province of Iran to the west.

== Geography and natural history ==
Gwadar District has a 600 kilometres (370 mi) long coastline along the Gulf of Oman of the Arabian Sea. The district is located in the coastal region on the Arabian Sea, south-west of the Quetta City, the provincial capital of Balochistan. District Lasbela is in the east and Kech and Awaran districts are in the north and sharing its boundaries in the west with Iran. It has a scenic coastal highway that originates from district Lasbela and passes through the Gwadar district. The most significant feature of the Gwadar District is Gwadar Port, a deep sea warm water port. It is located on the eastern bay of a natural hammer-head protrusion of land, from the coast, distended into the apex of Arabian Sea.

Gwadar was a part of Oman

Parts of Gwadar were once under the control of Oman and were purchased by Pakistan in 1958.

Gwadar District is situated on a thin strip of land along Pakistan's southwestern Arabian Sea coast in Balochistan province. The district is administratively divided into five Tehsils: the city of Jiwani in the southwest along the eastern edge of Gwatar Bay, bordered by Gwadar Tehsil to its north and east; Pasni Tehsil is further east, followed by the city of Ormara. The cities of Gwadar and Ormara are situated on natural hammerhead-shaped tombolo peninsulas which form two almost perfect, but naturally curved, semicircular bays on either side. The city is situated on a narrow and sandy 12 km-long (7 mi) isthmus which connects the Pakistani coast to rocky outcroppings in the Arabian sea known as the Gwadar Promontory, or Koh-e-Batil, which reach an elevation of 150 m (480 ft) and extend 11 km (7 mi) east to west with a breadth of 1.5 km (1 mi). The 240 m (800 ft) wide isthmus upon which Gwadar is located separates the two almost perfect semicircular bays from one another. The western bay is known as the Paddi Zirr, and is generally shallow with an average depth of 3.7 m (12 ft), and a maximum depth of 9.1 m (30 ft). To the east of the isthmus is the deep-water Demi Zirr harbour, where the Gwadar Port was built.

== Administration ==
Gwadar District is subdivided into five tehsils or sub-districts:

Tehsil	Area (km²)	Pop. (2023)	Density (ppl/km²) (2023)	Literacy rate (2023)	Union Councils
Gwadar Tehsil	2,590	147,673	57.02	51.60%	...
Jiwani Tehsil	454	35,004	77.10	35.28%	...
Ormara Tehsil	2,796	27,832	9.95	49.08%	...
Pasni Tehsil	4,822	74,128	15.37	59.71%	...
Suntsar Tehsil	1,975	20,523	10.39	31.69%	...

=== Union Councils ===
There are 18 Union Councils in Gwadar District:

Union Councils are given below:

Union Council No	Union Councils Name	Ward Names
UC No 1	Surbandar	1.Kauda Ababakar Muhallah, 2.Kauda Shadiyan Muhallah, 3.Baloch Muhallah, 4.Kuhda Assa Muhallah, 5.Noor Muhammad Pada/Muhallah, 6.Kappari Muhallah, 7.Kohbon
UC No 2	Gurab Surbandar	1.Kuhda Shaban Muhallah, 2. Haji Qasim Muhallah, 3. Dad Karim Muhallah, 4.Lala Hassan muhallah, 5.Fisheries Muhallah, 6.Mir Akbar Muhallah, 7.Gurab
UC No 3	Chib Kalmati	1.Chaib Kalmati, 2. Chaib Rekani, 3. Kia Kalat, 4. Shanikani Dar, 5.Ziarat Machi, 6. Washeen Dhoor, 7.Johar Khan, 8.Faqir Colony, 9.Nigoor Sharif,10.Dhoor Gatti
UC No 4	Pishukan	1.Kargani Chib, 2.Ishaque Ward, 3.Qadir Khan Ward Shumali, 4. Qadir Khan Ward Janubi, 5.Brisi Ward Shumali/Wasti, 6.Chahbari, 7. Qasba Ward Garbi, 8. Qasba Ward Sharqi, 9.Dashti
UC No 5	Palleri	1. Palleri, 2. Saiji, 3.Chatti, 4.Garuk/Gamaro, 5. Gamaroo, 6.Mazani/Shabi, 7.pasuu/Prahe Tok
UC No 6	Ganz	1.Panwan, 2.Pawan, 3.Ganz, 4. Ganz, 5.Bandari,6.Kargoski/Bandi
UC No 7	Kalatoo Sunstar	1.Kalatoo, 2. Samati, 3. Chawad Bal, 4. Zahran, 5. Zahran Dad Shah, 6.Mir Jatt, 7.Domb/Shaygosh
UC No 8	Gubd	1.Gabd, 2.Chattan/Kuldan, 3. Suntsar, 4. Meteing,5.Dalsar, 6.Soui, 7. Hajjrat
UC No 9	Kallag	1.Kallag, 2.Rahella, 3. JadGal, 4.Nok Bur, 5.Chib Wari, 6.Chiliri, 7.Nagi, 8.Gano
UC No 10	Ban	1.Ban Northern, 2.Ambi, 3. Palado, 4.Palado, 5.Kukhar Central, 6.Kukur Northern
UC No 11	Churbandar	1.Chur Bandar, 2. Chakuli, 3.Zameen Took, 4.Kandasool(E), 5. Shatangi Kandari, 6.Chukain
UC No 12	Kalmat	1.Shadi Kaur, 2.Kalmat, 3.Makola, 4.Bal, 5. Espehak,6.Chandi, 7.Jonz
UC No 13	Naliant	1.Mehmoodi Bal
UC No 14	Faqirabad Naliant	1.Faqirabad Naliant, 2.Anari, 3.Suleman Bazar, 4.Kohan Door, 5.Cheel, 6.Sham, 7.Kohdaim
UC No 15	Hari Bellar	1.Hari Bellar Shamali, 2. Gwandein Nigor Shamali,3.Hari Belar Wasti, 4.Hari Belar Janubi, 5.Nal Wad Janubi
UC No 16	Kappae	1.Taj Muhammad Bazar, 2.Sharif Bazar, 3.Murad Bakhsh, 4.Usman Bazar, 5.Sham Kappar, 6.Sar Chib
UC No 17	Hud	1.Hud, 2.Gor Hud, 3.Kandelak, 4.Bal, 5.Balada, 6. Rach
UC No 18	Basool	1.Sayed Abad, 2.Juna Line, 3.Ghazi Line, 4.Islamia Line, 5.Kuntagi Line 6.Punjag 7.Basol, 8.Jaffari, 9.Kahordan, 10.Sakooni, 11.Serki, 12. Takk, 13, New Town

== Demographics ==
=== Population ===
Historical population
Year	Pop.	±% p.a.
1951	40,630	—
1961	49,661	+2.03%
1972	90,820	+5.64%
1981	112,385	+2.40%
1998	185,498	+2.99%
2017	262,253	+1.84%
2023	305,160	+2.56%

As of the 2023 census, Gwadar district has 50,357 households and a population of 305,160. The district has a sex ratio of 111.33 males to 100 females and a literacy rate of 50.30%: 57.62% for males and 42.19% for females. 88,795 (29.32% of the surveyed population) are under 10 years of age. 159,035 (52.12%) live in urban areas.

=== Religion ===
According to 2023 census, 99.15% population of Gwadar district adheres to Islam. Religious minorities are split evenly between Hinduism, Christianity and 'Other' religions, namely Zikris. The Shri Krishna Mandir, also known as the Om mandir, is the main Hindu temple in the district.

=== Language ===
Languages of Gwadar district (2023)
1. Balochi (97.7%)
2. Sindhi (0.45%)
3. Punjabi (0.42%)
4. Urdu (0.40%)
5. Others (1.07%)

At the time of the 2023 census, 97.66% of the population spoke Balochi, 0.45% Sindhi, 0.42% Punjabi and 0.4% Urdu as their first language.

== Education ==
According to Pakistan District Education Rankings, a report by Alif Ailaan, district Gwadar is ranked nationally at 61, with an education score of 59.47 and learning score of 62.65. Enrollment levels are low in Gwadar because of fewer schools in the district, and the level of enrollment declines as the classes move up.

The school infrastructure score of Gwadar is 29.91, giving it a national rank of 122. 33% of all the schools in the district cater to girls as compared to 67% schools for boys, putting girls at a greater disadvantage. Lack of science labs and subject specialist teachers are also a major concern.

Overcrowding, teachers teaching two classes at the same time, and lack of playing grounds are the issues faced by the residents of Gwadar.

== See also ==
- List of tehsils in Pakistan
- Districts of Pakistan
  - Districts of Khyber Pakhtunkhwa, Pakistan
  - Districts of Punjab, Pakistan
  - Districts of Balochistan, Pakistan
  - Districts of Sindh, Pakistan
  - Districts of Azad Kashmir
  - Districts of Gilgit-Baltistan
