= Central Makran Range =

Mountain range in Balochistan, Pakistan

Coordinates: 26°40′N 64°30′E

- Location within Pakistan

Highest point
- Elevation: 3,000 m (9,800 ft)

Geography
- Location: Balochistan, Pakistan
- Parent range: Makran region

Geology
- Rock age(s): Formed by the collision of the northwestern Indian Plate and the Asian Plate
- Mountain type: Mountain range
- Rock type(s): Primarily limestone and sandstone

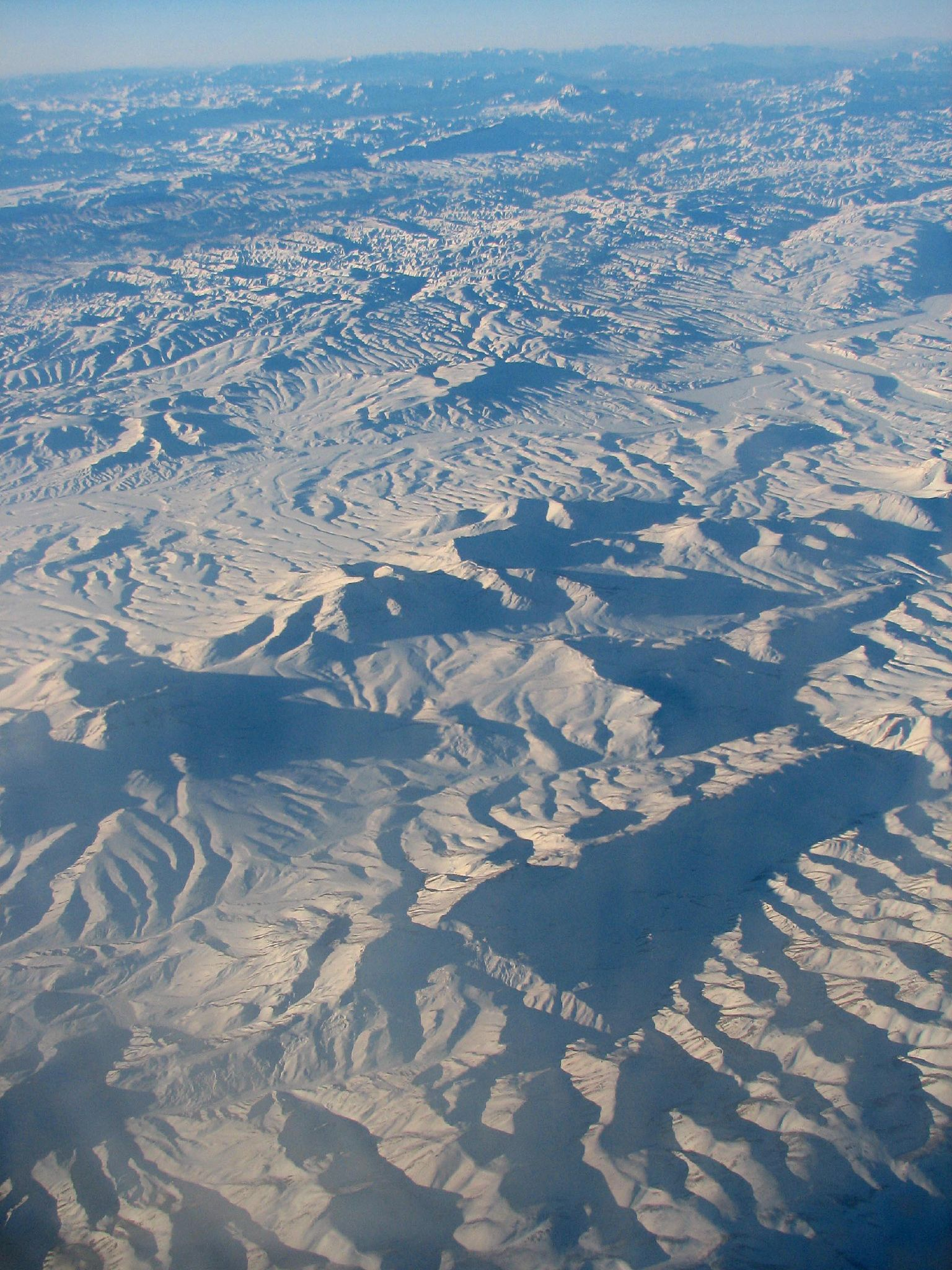
Aerial view of the Central Makran Range, in southwest Pakistan

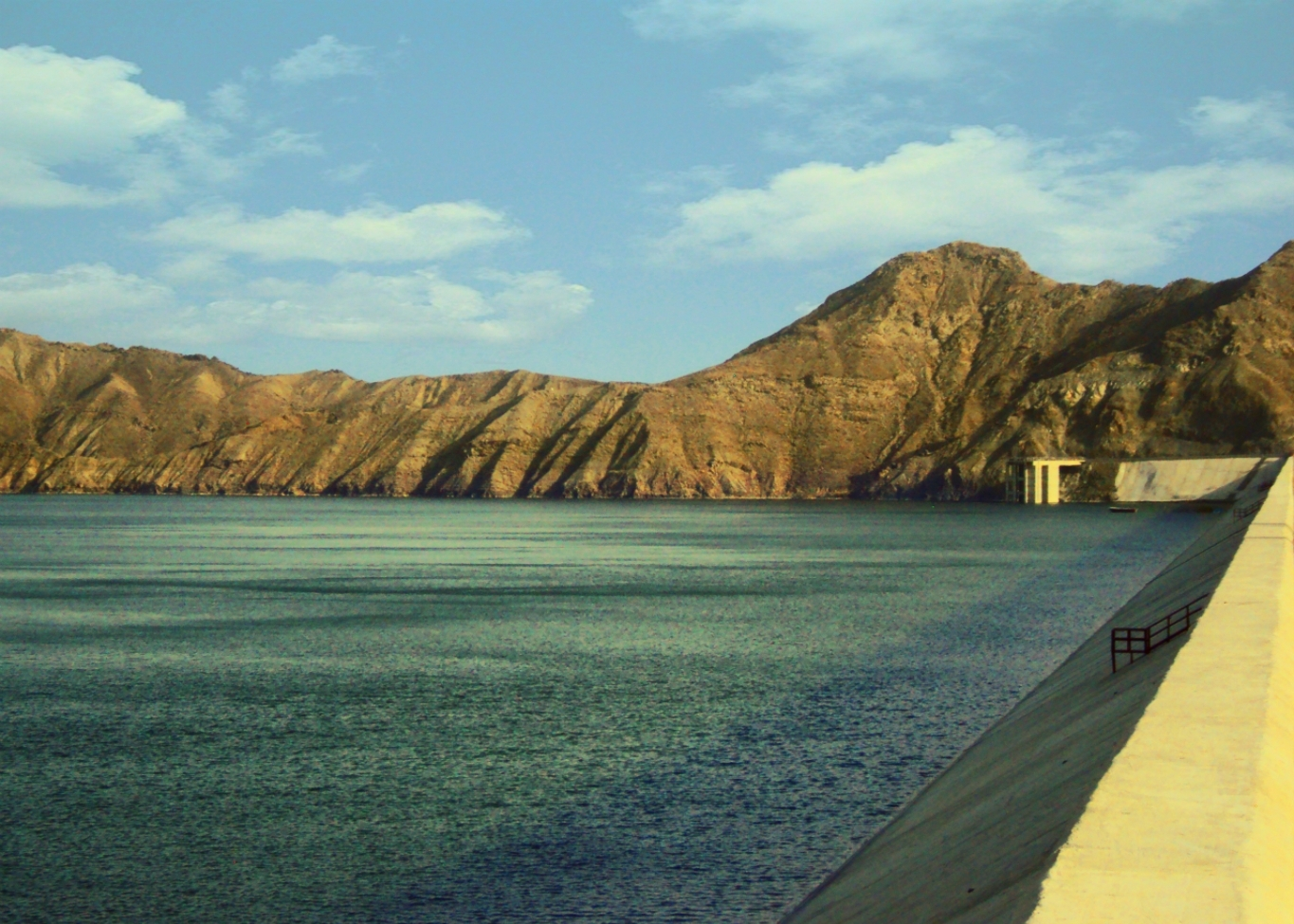
Mirani Dam and reservoir, on the Dasht River, in the Central Makran Range

The Central Makran Range is a mountain range in the Makran region, in southwestern section of Balochistan Province, in southwestern Pakistan.

== Geography ==
It is one of three ranges in the mountain ranges system of the province. The range's peaks are 2,000–3,000 metres (6,600–9,800 ft) in elevation.

Mirani Dam across the Dasht River forms a reservoir in the range, to provide irrigation water in the region and drinking water for the city of Gwadar.

== Geology ==
The Central Makran Range is primarily made up of limestone and sandstone. It was formed when the northwestern Indian Plate collided with the Asian Plate.

== Adjacent ranges ==
There are three main ranges in Balochistan:

- the Makran Coastal Range (up to about 1,500 metres (4,900 ft));
- the Central Makran Range (2,000–3,000 metres (6,600–9,800 ft));
- the Siahan Range (1,000–2,000 metres (3,300–6,600 ft)).

== See also ==
- Geography of Balochistan, Pakistan
