= Economy of Pakistan =

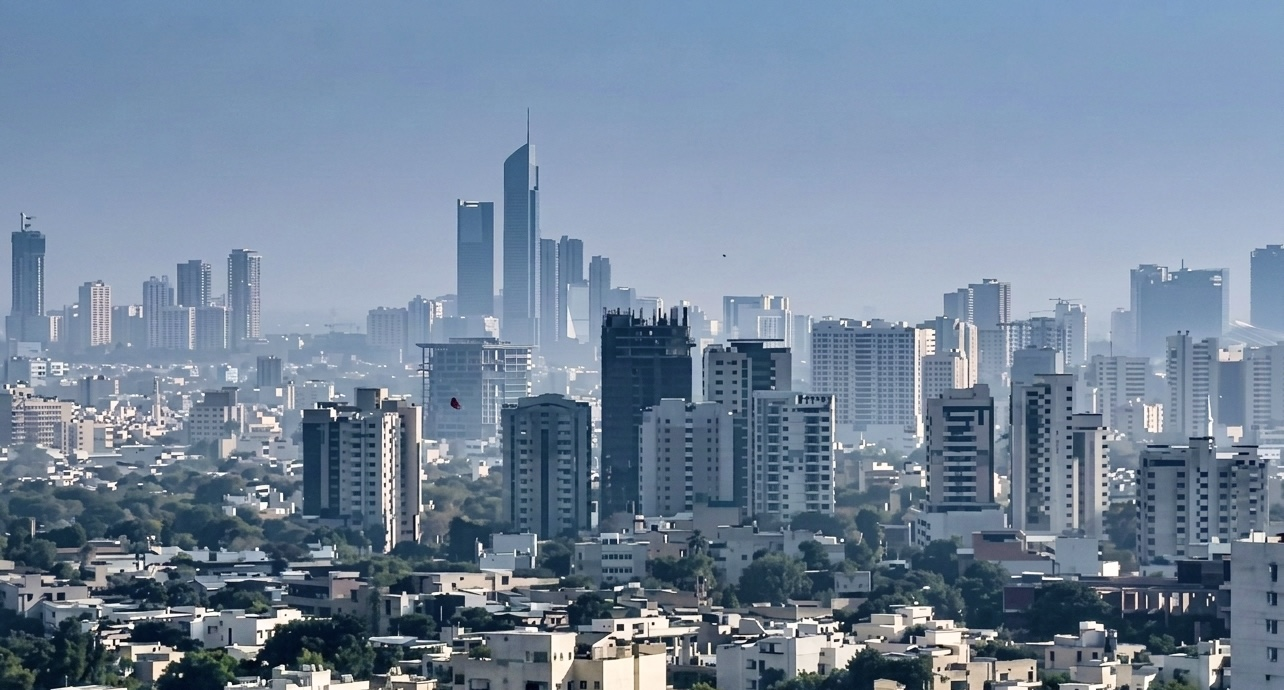
- Karachi, the financial centre of Pakistan
- Currency: Pakistani rupee (₨) (PKR)
- Fiscal year: 1 July – 30 June
- Trade organisations: ECO, SAFTA, WTO, AIIB, ADB, SAARC OIC
- Country group: Developing; Lower-middle income

Statistics
- Population: 241,480,000 (2023 census)
- GDP: ▲$467.02 billion (nominal; 2026); ▲$2.168 trillion (PPP; 2026)
- GDP rank: 40th (nominal; 2026); 25th (PPP; 2026)
- GDP growth: ▲3.1% (2025); ▲3.7% (2026); ▲4.5% (2027)
- GDP per capita: ▲$1,935 (nominal; 2026); ▲$8,978 (PPP; 2026)
- GDP per capita rank: 157th (nominal; 2026); 138th (PPP; 2026)
- GDP per capita growth: ▲2.5% (2026)
- GDP by sector: Agriculture: 23.44%; Industry: 18.14%; Services: 58.42%; (2026)
- GDP by component: Household consumption: 82.0%; Government consumption: 11.3%; Investment in fixed capital: 14.5%; Investment in inventories: 1.6%; Exports of goods and services: 8.2%; Imports of goods and services: −17.6%; (2017 est.)
- Inflation (CPI): ▲3% (2026)
- Population below national poverty line: ▼21.9% to 25.1% (2026); ▲2.2% in extreme poverty (2026)
- Gini coefficient: ▲31.6 medium (2018)
- Human Development Index: ▲0.588 low (2026) (168th)
- Labour force: ▲83,644,000 (2026)
- Labour force by occupation: Agriculture: 37.4%; Industry: 25.4%; Services: 37.2%; (2021)
- Unemployment: ▼4.1% (2026)
- Youth unemployment: 12.6% (2024-25)
- Informal employment: 88.5% (2026)
- Main industries
Further information
- Textiles
- Apparel
- Food processing
- Pharmaceuticals
- Surgical instruments
- Construction materials
- Fertilizer
- Overseas remote freelancing
- Seafood
- Luxury products
- Technology
- Paper products
- Automotive
- Telecommunication
- Marble
- Glass manufacturing
- Shipbreaking
- Ornamentations
- Banking
- Energy
- Precious minerals & metals
- Defense industry
- Media
- Education
- Tourism
- Financial services
- Human resources

External
- Exports: ▲$48.81 billion (2026)
- Export goods: Textiles: $16.3 billion; Food: $7 billion; Chemicals and pharmaceuticals: $1.42 billion; Leather goods: $877 million; Sports goods: $439 million; Petroleum: $553 million
- Main export partners: China 8.7%; United Arab Emirates 6.7%; United Kingdom 6.5%; Germany 4.9%; Spain 4.7%; Netherlands 4.4%; United States 17.5%; Italy 3.6%; (2024 est.)
- Imports: ▼$70.82 billion (2026)
- Import goods: Petroleum: $15.1 billion; Agriculture and other chemicals: $8.9 billion; Machinery: $7.4 billion; Food: $7.1 billion; Metal: $4.6 billion; Textile: $3.89 billion; Transport: $1.62 billion
- Main import partners: China 25.4%; United Arab Emirates 11.9%; Saudi Arabia 8.5%; Singapore 4.6%; Indonesia 4.5%; Kuwait 3.4%; Russia 2.0%; United States 3.6%; (2024 est.)
- FDI stock: ▲ Domestic: $40.25 billion (2026); ▲ Abroad: $3.73 billion (2026)
- Current account: ▲$1.8 billion (2025)
- Gross external debt: ▲$125.7 billion (2026)

Public finance
- Government debt: ▲83.6% of GDP (2026)
- Foreign reserves: ▲$28.8 billion (2026)
- Budget balance: ▼ −2.6% of GDP (2024)
- Revenue: ▲15.5% of GDP (2026)
- Spending: ▲19.3% of GDP (2024)
- Economic aid: ▲$4.1 billion (2026)
- Credit rating: Standard & Poor's: B (long term); B (short term); Outlook: stable; Moody's: B3; Outlook: stable; Fitch: B− (April 2026); Outlook: stable
- All values, unless otherwise stated, are in US dollars.

Pakistan has a developing capitalist economy with a large agriculture sector. It is the 40th-largest in terms of nominal GDP and the 25th-largest economy by purchasing power parity (PPP) as of 2026. In per capita terms, the Pakistani economic output ranks 157th by nominal GDP and 138th by PPP GDP. Economic development in Pakistan is varied with growth centers located along the Indus River. Major urban centers with diversified economies include Karachi and the broader Punjab region, including Faisalabad, Lahore, Sialkot, Rawalpindi, and Gujranwala. With a large population exceeding 240 million (2023 census), Pakistan is sensitive to immigration, natural disasters and regional armed conflict.

Historically reliant on its private sector, Pakistan underwent nationalization in the 1970s, with a focus on its financial services, manufacturing, and transportation industries. It converted to an Islamic economic system in the following decade, outlawing economic practices forbidden under Shari'a law. During the 1990s, the underdeveloped Pakistani economy began to privatize strategic sectors again becoming a semi-industrial nation by the 21st century. It has been dependent on agriculture and its textile industry for the majority their foreign exports. Pakistan has endured a variety of economic and financial crises, with the nation recovering from a protracted malaise since 2025.

Pakistan's public finances have been strained by a sustained depreciation of the Pakistani rupee, its official currency. With a debt-to-GDP ratio of 70% to 80% as of 2026, servicing public debt occasionally reaches two-thirds of government spending. The country has historically shared a deep trading relationship with China who is both their top import and export partner. Pakistan is a lower-middle income country with much of its modern economic development focused on improving standards of living for its population. It ranks among the lower GDP per capita output nations in the world, with poverty in the country a recurrent focal point in public affairs.

== History ==
=== Inception ===
In the late 1940s, upon its establishment, Pakistan had an agrarian-based economy. Agriculture constituted 53% of the country's GDP in 1947 and slightly increased to 53.2% in 1949–50. With a population of approximately 30 million, including around 6 million residing in urban areas, about 65% of the labor force was engaged in agriculture. The agricultural sector played a crucial role, contributing to 99.2% of exports and making up nearly 90% of foreign exchange earnings.

Despite possessing significant land and mineral resources in both East and West Pakistan, including natural gas, crude oil, coal, limestone, and marble, Pakistan faced numerous challenges. In 1950, its per capita income was around $360 (in 1985 international dollars), and the literacy rate was only 10%. The nation encountered a lack of economic infrastructure, financial resources, and an industrial foundation, particularly with poverty rates ranging from 55% to 60% in the West Pakistan region.

Due to limited capital in the small private sector, the government opted to focus on the public sector to foster economic and industrial development. In the fiscal year 1949–50, Pakistan recorded a national savings rate of 2%, a foreign savings rate of 2%, and an investment rate of 4%. Manufacturing contributed 7.8% to the GDP, while services, trade, and other sectors accounted for a significant 39%, reflecting a policy centered around import-substituting industrialization. The trade balance of payments indicated a deficit of 66 million rupees (Rs) during the period spanning 1949–50 to 1950–51.

=== 1950s ===
The 1950s marked the initiation of planned development in Pakistan, with the introduction of the Colombo Plan in 1951 leading to a series of Five-Year Plans from 1955 to 1998. Concurrently, a Ten-Year Perspective Plan was implemented, complemented by a rolling Three-Year Development Plan.

During the 1950s, Pakistan pursued a policy of import-substituting industrialization. Notably, the Korean War (1950–1953) brought substantial merchant profits to Pakistan's public and emerging private sectors, fueling industrialization.

In 1952, Pakistan imposed bans on the imports of cotton textiles and luxury goods, followed by comprehensive import regulations in 1953, propelling the country into the ranks of the fastest-growing nations. However, biased policies against agriculture and unfavorable trade terms between agriculture and industry led to a decline in the annual growth rate of agriculture.

By the late 1950s, Pakistan achieved self-sufficiency in cotton textiles, emphasizing export development. The influx of US military and economic aid amounting to US$500 million during 1955–58 contributed to Pakistan's growth reliant on foreign aid.

In 1959, after a military coup d'état in 1958, the martial law regime introduced export bonus vouchers as import licenses and exempted certain goods from licensing. During this period, Pakistan faced a worsening trade balance, with deficits increasing from −831 million Rupees in 1950/51 to −1043 million rupees in 1959/60.

Economically, agriculture grew at an annual rate of 1.6%, while manufacturing expanded impressively at 7.7% per annum during the 1950s. In the fiscal year 1959–60, the Per Capita Gross National Product (GNP) stood at Rs. 355 in West Pakistan and Rs. 269 in East Pakistan, indicating a growing economic disparity between the two regions.

=== 1960s ===
In the 1960s, amid a substantial influx of American aid, Pakistan enjoyed political stability, fostering robust economic growth. Poverty, measured by the poverty headcount ratio, fluctuated from nearly 50% in the early 1960s to 54% in 1963–64.

During the 1960s, Pakistan achieved an impressive annual agricultural growth rate of 5%, driven by substantial investments in water resources, increased farmer incentives, mechanization, greater use of fertilizers and pesticides, and expanded cultivation of high-yielding rice and wheat varieties in the Green Revolution.

Large-scale manufacturing experienced significant growth, expanding at a remarkable rate of 16% per annum from 1960/61 to 1964/65, fueled by protective measures for domestic industries, including export subsidies.

The Pakistan-India War of 1965 led to reduced foreign economic assistance, impacting the growth rate of large-scale manufacturing. From 1965 to 1970, this sector grew at a comparatively lower rate of 10% per annum.

=== 1970s ===
The economic landscape in the early 1970s witnessed growing disparities between East and West Pakistan, leading to East Pakistan's declaration of independence and the emergence of Bangladesh in 1971. Subsequently, Pakistan underwent notable transformations in both its political and economic spheres.

The military coup d'état of 1977, leading to the establishment of a martial law regime that initiated denationalization, deregulation, and privatization policies. Agriculture experienced modest growth at a rate of 2.4% per annum, while large-scale manufacturing expanded at a rate of 5.5% per annum during the 1970s. Large and medium-scale private manufacturing played a significant role, contributing 75% of the total value-added and investment in manufacturing during the 1970s. The remaining 25% of value-added came from small-scale manufacturing.

=== 2000s ===
The 2000s witnessed a period of substantial economic challenges and transformations for Pakistan. The impact of high public debt gained prominence, contributing to a decline in the growth rate to less than 4% per annum. With an initial upturn in the growth rate, the decade unfolded with persistent macroeconomic crises. Achieving a growth rate of 8.6% in 2004, subsequent years were marred by a series of setbacks, including a growth slowdown, low growth, high inflation, an energy crisis, and worsening fiscal and balance of payments positions.

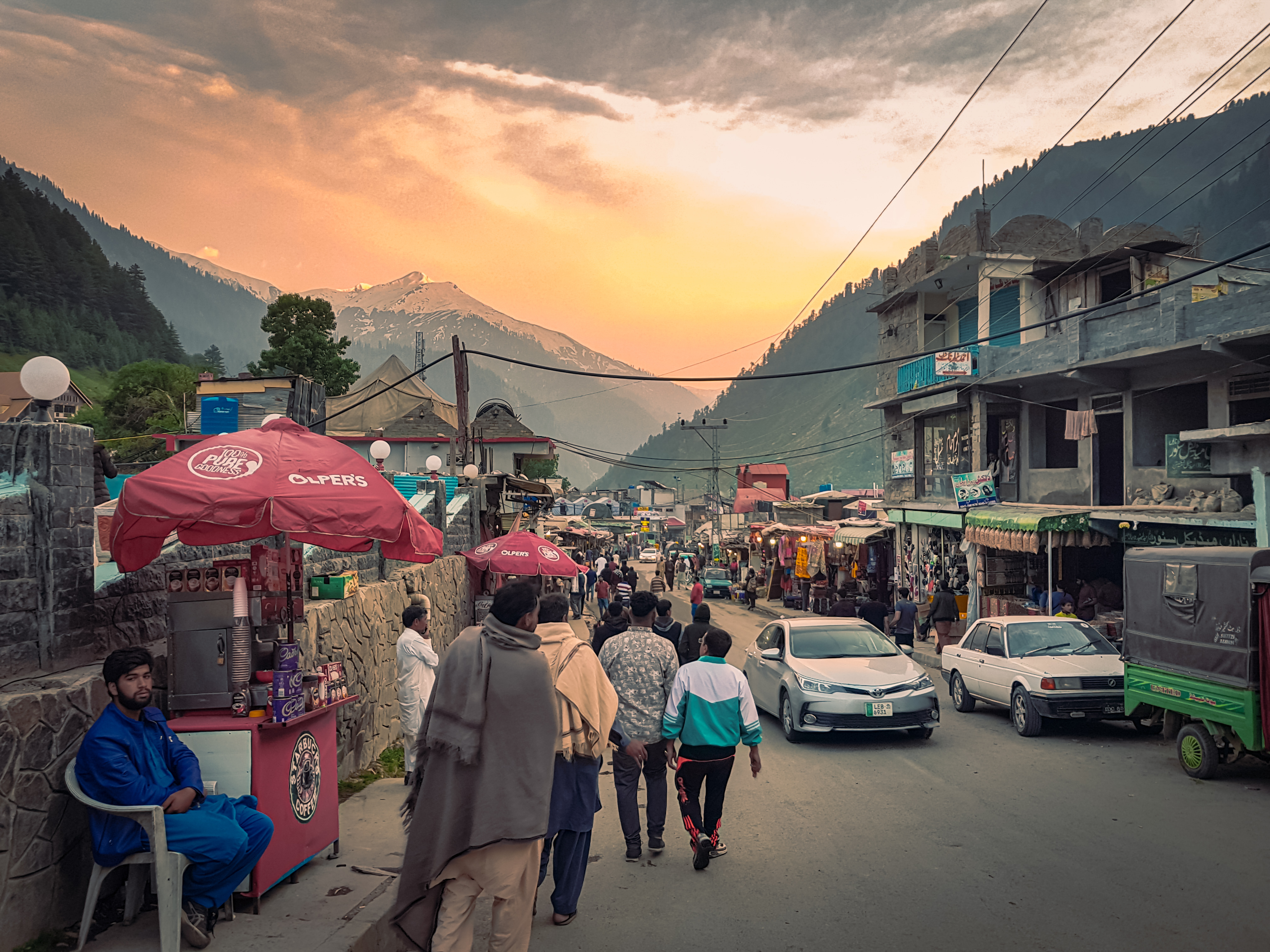
A trading post in Kaghan Valley, Pakistan, 2021

There was rise in poverty incidence to 34.5% in 2000 with a subsequent decrease to 22.3% in 2005. The unemployment rate saw fluctuations, rising to 7.8% in 2002 but later declining to 5% by 2008. Efforts to enhance education and literacy rates were evident as adult literacy stood at 55% in 2007. Economic crises hit Pakistan in 2008, primarily influenced by the 2008 financial crisis.

Economic growth in 2009 reached 4.1%, with positive contributions from various sectors, including a 2% growth in agriculture, 4.9% growth in industrial output, 4.4% growth in large-scale manufacturing, and a 4.6% expansion in the services sector. By March 2010, public debt had accumulated to Rs. 8,160 billion, with a total public debt/GDP ratio of 56% and a foreign-currency denominated debt-to-GDP ratio of 25%. Amid these economic dynamics, Pakistan underwent a structural transition.

In late 2021, Pakistan entered a severe economic crisis as inflation surged, the rupee plunged in value, gas supplies dried up, foreign reserves declined and debt increased significantly. In 2025, Pakistan's economic output was estimated at $410 billion, with a growth rate of about 2.7% and GDP per capita near $1,707 driven by improvements in fiscal discipline, remittance inflows, and external sector performance. Remittances from overseas Pakistanis increased by over 31% that year, bolstering foreign exchange reserves and contributing to a current account surplus.

== Data ==
=== Gross domestic product (GDP) ===
The table below displays key economic indicators from 1980 to 2025.

Year	GDP (Billion US$ PPP)	GDP per capita (US$ PPP)	GDP (Billion US$ nominal)	GDP per capita (US$ nominal)	GDP growth (Real)	Inflation (Percent)	Public debt (% of GDP)
1980	75	950.0	38.6	418.9	▲6.9%	▲11.9%	n/a
1981	▲87	▲1,072.8	▲45.7	▲481.3	▲6.2%	▲11.9%	n/a
1982	▲100	▲1,190.0	▲49.9	▲511.0	▲7.6%	▲5.9%	n/a
1983	▲110	▲1,283.6	▼46.6	▼463.7	▲6.8%	▲6.4%	n/a
1984	▲119	▲1,345.3	▲50.6	▲489.8	▲4.0%	▲6.1%	n/a
1985	▲133	▲1,468.4	50.6	▼476.7	▲8.7%	▲5.6%	n/a
1986	▲145	▲1,551.3	▲51.8	▼475.3	▲6.4%	▲3.5%	n/a
1987	▲157	▲1,638.5	▲54.2	▲483.9	▲5.8%	▲4.7%	n/a
1988	▲173	▲1,759.4	▲62.4	▲543.1	▲6.4%	▲8.8%	n/a
1989	▲188	▲1,868.3	▲65.0	▲552.0	▲4.8%	▲7.9%	n/a
1990	▲204	▲1,970.1	▲65.3	▼538.4	▲4.6%	▲9.1%	n/a
1991	▲222	▲2,094.8	▲74.2	▲598.4	▲5.4%	▲12.6%	n/a
1992	▲244	▲2,211.1	▲79.3	▲614.2	▲7.6%	▲4.8%	n/a
1993	▲255	▲2,252.4	▲83.4	▲633.6	▲2.1%	▲9.8%	n/a
1994	▲272	▲2,341.1	▲84.6	▼622.8	▲4.4%	▲11.3%	64.8%
1995	▲292	▲2,449.6	▲98.9	▲709.9	▲5.1%	▲13.0%	▼58.0%
1996	▲317	▲2,594.8	▲103.3	▲723.5	▲6.6%	▲10.8%	▲58.2%
1997	▲328	▲2,620.8	▼101.8	▼696.4	▲1.7%	▲12.8%	▲58.5%
1998	▲343	▲2,678.9	▼101.4	▼677.0	▲3.5%	▲6.8%	▲59.5%
1999	▲363	▲2,765.6	▼96.0	▼626.5	▲4.2%	▲5.7%	▲67.2%
2000	▲385	▲2,855.1	▲99.4	▲630.3	▲3.9%	▲3.6%	▲68.4%
2001	▲408	▲2,916.7	▼96.8	▼602.0	▲3.7%	▲4.4%	▲72.2%
2002	▲425	▲2,995.0	▲98.2	▼593.9	▲2.4%	▲3.5%	▼67.6%
2003	▲456	▲3,119.8	▲112.5	▲666.1	▲5.6%	▲3.1%	▼62.7%
2004	▲505	▲3,376.5	▲132.2	▲767.8	▲7.7%	▲4.6%	▼56.3%
2005	▲562	▲3,722.9	▲145.2	▲842.0	▲7.5%	▲9.3%	▼52.3%
2006	▲612	▲3,986.8	▲161.9	▲961.4	▲5.6%	▲7.9%	▼48.4%
2007	▲661	▲4,244.6	▲184.1	▲1,048.4	▲5.5%	▲7.8%	▼47.1%
2008	▲704	▲4,362.9	▲202.2	▲1,124.0	▲5.0%	▲12.0%	▲51.9%
2009	▲715	▼4,240.5	▼187.1	▼1,186.5	▲0.4%	▲19.6%	▲52.8%
2010	▲740	▲4,283.3	▲196.7	▼1,122.7	▲2.6%	▲10.1%	▲54.5%
2011	▲780	▲4,403.0	▲230.6	▲1,325.8	▲3.6%	▲13.7%	▼52.8%
2012	▲820	▲4,516.4	▲250.1	▲1,364.8	▲3.8%	▲11.0%	▲56.7%
2013	▲866	▲4,655.3	▲258.7	▲1,378.6	▲3.7%	▲7.4%	▲57.9%
2014	▲912	▲4,786.2	▲271.4	▲1,428.4	▲4.1%	▲8.6%	▼57.1%
2015	▲956	▲4,893.3	▲299.9	▲1,550.5	▲4.1%	▲4.5%	▼57.0%
2016	▲1,004	▲5,016.6	▲313.6	▲1,566.6	▲4.6%	▲2.9%	▲60.8%
2017	▲1,069	▲5,212.2	▲339.2	▲1,653.4	▲4.6%	▲4.1%	▲60.9%
2018	▲1,130	▲5,387.2	▲356.2	▲1,698.0	▲6.1%	▲3.9%	▲64.8%
2019	▲1,163	▲5,434.3	▼321.1	▼1,500.7	▲3.1%	▲6.7%	▲78.7%
2020	▲1,186	▲5,435.7	▼300.4	▼1,376.5	▼-0.9%	▲10.7%	▲80.8%
2021	▲1,285	▲5,774.5	▲348.5	▲1,565.6	▲5.8%	▲8.9%	▼74.7%
2022	▲1,462	▲6,440.9	▲374.8	▲1651.3	▲6.2%	▲12.2%	▲77.3%
2023	▲1,512	▲6,530.9	▼337.8	▼1,459	▼-0.2%	▲29.2%	▲78.2%
2024	▲1,587	▲6,724	▲373.1	▲1,581	▲2.5%	▲23.4%	▼70.1%
2025	▲1,811	▲7,370	450.1	1,840	▲2.6%	▲5.1%	▲73.6%
2026	▲2,168	▲8,978	▲467.1	▲1,935	▲3.7%	▼3.0%	n/a

Real GDP per capita growth was 1.5% in 2024.

=== Stock market ===
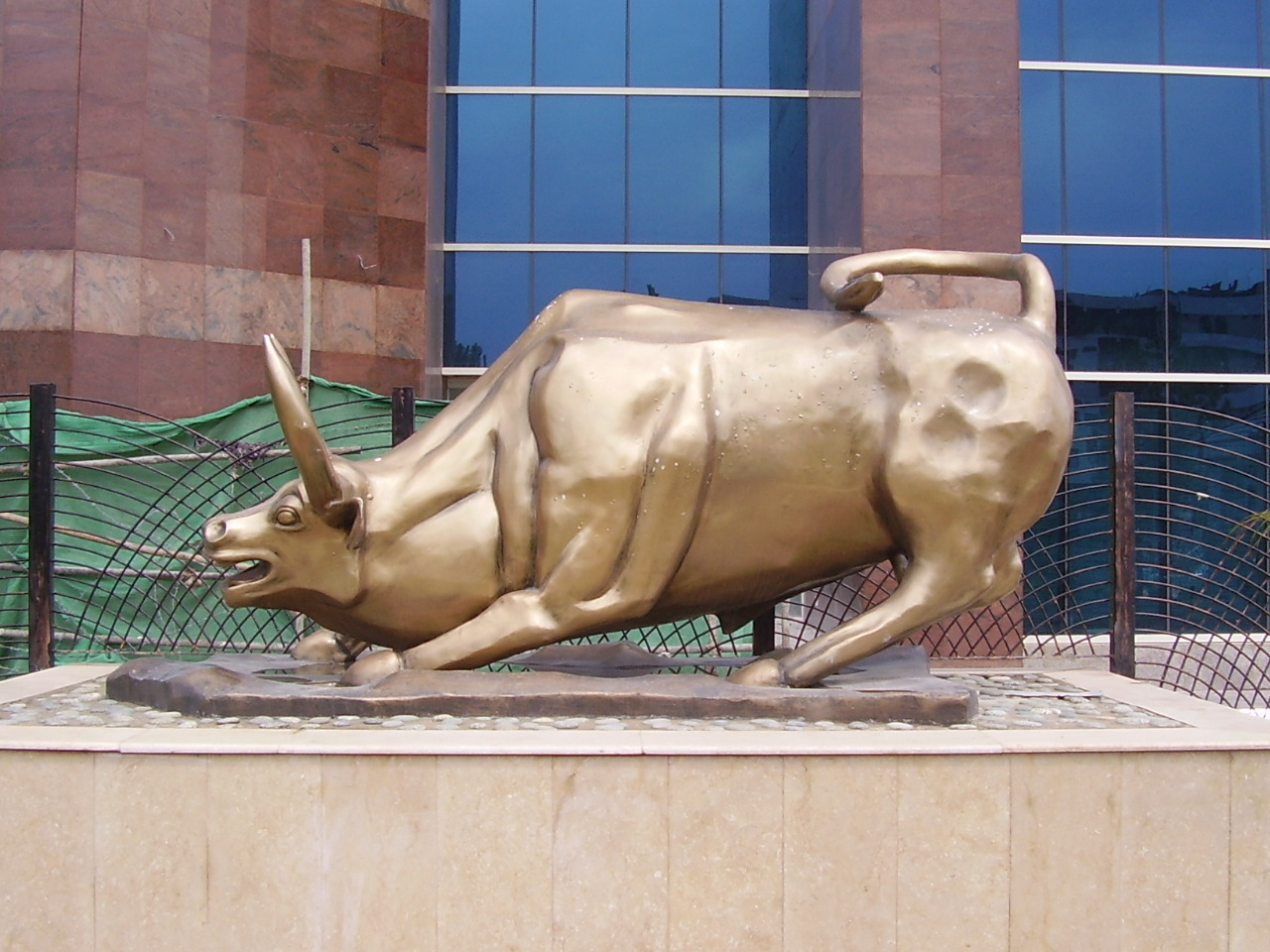
Statue of a bull outside the Islamabad Stock Exchange, 2009.

In the first four years of the twenty-first century, Pakistan's KSE 100 Index was declared the best-performing stock market index in the world by the international magazine "Business Week", referred to in Figure 1 in a research paper published in the Journal of Economics Finance and Administrative Science in 2022. The stock market capitalization of listed companies in Pakistan was valued at $5,937 million in 2005 by the World Bank. On 11 January 2016, with the aim of reducing market fragmentation and creating a strong case for attracting strategic partnerships necessary for providing technological expertise, all three stock exchanges, including Karachi Stock Exchange, Lahore Stock Exchange, and Islamabad Stock Exchange, were inducted into a unified Pakistan Stock Exchange.

=== Informal economy ===
The informal economy in Pakistan comprises economic activities and assets that are not fully captured by formal regulation, taxation, or national accounts. Estimates of its size vary according to methodology and definitions, but multiple sources indicate that the informal sector remains a substantial component of the country's economic structure. A Dawn analysis noted that the documented economy was estimated at US$340 billion in 2023, whereas the informal economy was projected at roughly US$457 billion, indicating that the informal economy may exceed the formal economy in overall size.

According to a recent labour force survey, 72.1% of non-agricultural employment was classified as informal in 2024–25, with informal work particularly prevalent in rural areas. The informal economy in Pakistan includes a wide range of activities such as unregistered manufacturing, retail, construction, transport, domestic work, and small enterprises. While it provides livelihoods for many households, its unrecorded nature complicates taxation and regulation, and policymakers have periodically highlighted the challenges and fiscal implications of informality.

Households also accumulate physical commodities such as gold and jewellery as part of their saving strategies; a significant portion of savings in Pakistan resides in informal instruments and physical assets, including gold, which are not entirely captured by formal statistics. Historical estimates once suggest Pakistanis might hold 3,000 to 5,000 tonnes of gold, indicating a possible range of US$40 billion to US$70 billion in household gold wealth as of 2025.

=== Middle class ===
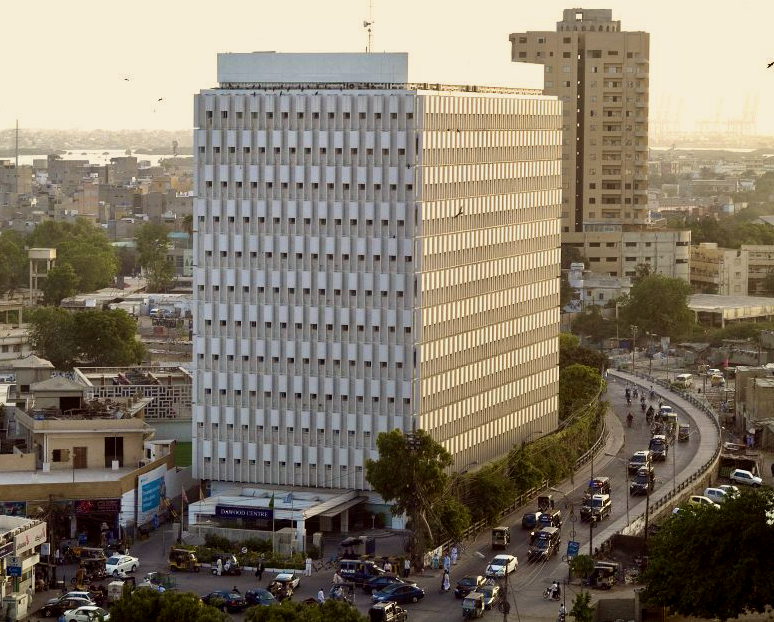
The Dawood Centre in Karachi, M.T. Khan Road.

As of 2017, according to the Wall Street Journal, citing estimates largely based on income and the purchase of consumption goods, had suggested that as many as 42% of Pakistan's population may now belong to the upper and middle classes. If these numbers are correct, or even indicative in any broad sense, then 87 million Pakistanis belong to the middle and upper classes, a population size which is larger than that of Germany. Official figures also show that the proportion of households that own a motorcycle and washing machines has grown impressively over the past 15 years. Furthermore, the IBA-SBP Consumer Confidence Index recorded its highest-ever level of 174.9 points in January 2017, showing an increase of 17 points from July 2016.

Separately, consumer financing recorded at Rs. 179 billion during FY 2022. Auto finance continued to be the dominant segment, followed by house building, which showed remarkable growth after the Mera Pakistan Mera Ghar scheme initiated by the State Bank of Pakistan in December 2020.

=== Poverty alleviation expenditures ===
The Pakistan government spent over 1 trillion rupees (about $16.7 billion) on poverty alleviation programs during the past four years, reducing poverty from 35% in 2000–01 to 29.3% in 2013 and further to 17% in 2015. Rural poverty remains a pressing issue, as development in those areas has been significantly slower than in major urban areas.

However, according to a World Bank report released in June 2025, around 45% of Pakistan's population was living below the poverty line. The updated figure was based on revised poverty thresholds and survey data from 2018 to 2019. The report also noted a sharp rise in extreme poverty, with the proportion increasing from 4.9% to 16.5%. As of 2025, the World Bank cautioned that over 10 million additional individuals in Pakistan faced the looming threat of descending into poverty.

=== Employment ===
The high population growth in the past few decades has led to a significant number of young people entering the labor market. Although Pakistan is among the six most populous Asian nations, excessive red tape in the past made firing from jobs, and consequently hiring, difficult. Significant progress in taxation and business reforms has ensured that many firms are no longer compelled to operate in the underground economy.

=== Government revenues and expenditures ===
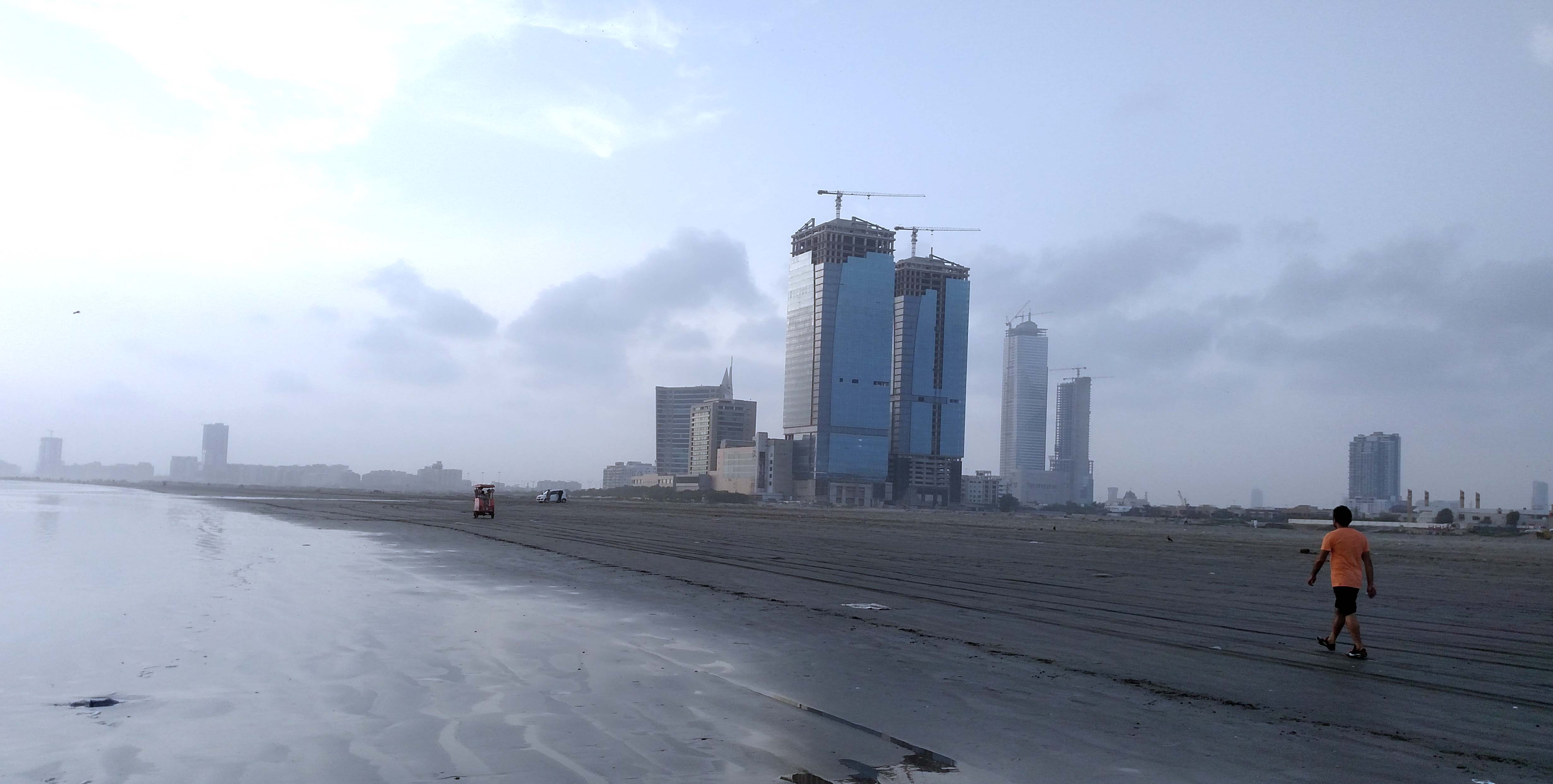
Clifton in Karachi, 2019.

Although the country is a Federation with constitutional division of taxation powers between the Federal Government and the four provinces, the revenue department of the Federal Government, the Federal Board of Revenue, collects more than 80% of the entire national tax collection. The government's revenue streams primarily stem from two sources: taxation and non-tax revenue. Taxation, which includes income tax, sales tax, and customs duties, constitutes a substantial portion of revenues, bolstering both federal and provincial government finances. Non-tax revenue sources, such as mark-up from state enterprises, surplus profits from the State Bank of Pakistan, and royalties on oil and gas, further contribute significantly to the fiscal framework.

== Currency ==
=== Rupee ===
The basic unit of currency is the rupee, ISO code PKR, and abbreviated Rs, which is divided into 100 paisas. Currently, the 5,000 rupee note is the largest denomination in circulation. From 13 August 2005, the SBP started introducing its fifth generation design of banknotes with additional security features, with the Rs. 20 note being the first issuance. New designs of Rs. 5 (July 2008, later replaced by a coin), 10 (May 2006), Rs. 20 (March 2008, new color scheme), Rs. 50 (July 2008), Rs. 100 (November 2006), Rs. 500 (January 2010), Rs. 1000 (February 2007), and Rs. 5000 (May 2006) were gradually introduced.

The Pakistani rupee was pegged to the pound sterling until 1982, when the government of General Zia-ul-Haq, changed it to a managed float regime. As a result, the rupee devalued by 38.5% between 1982/83, and many of the industries built by his predecessor suffered a huge surge in import costs. After years of appreciation under Zulfikar Ali Bhutto and despite huge increases in foreign aid, the rupee depreciated.

== Major sectors ==
=== Agriculture, fishing, forestry and livestock ===
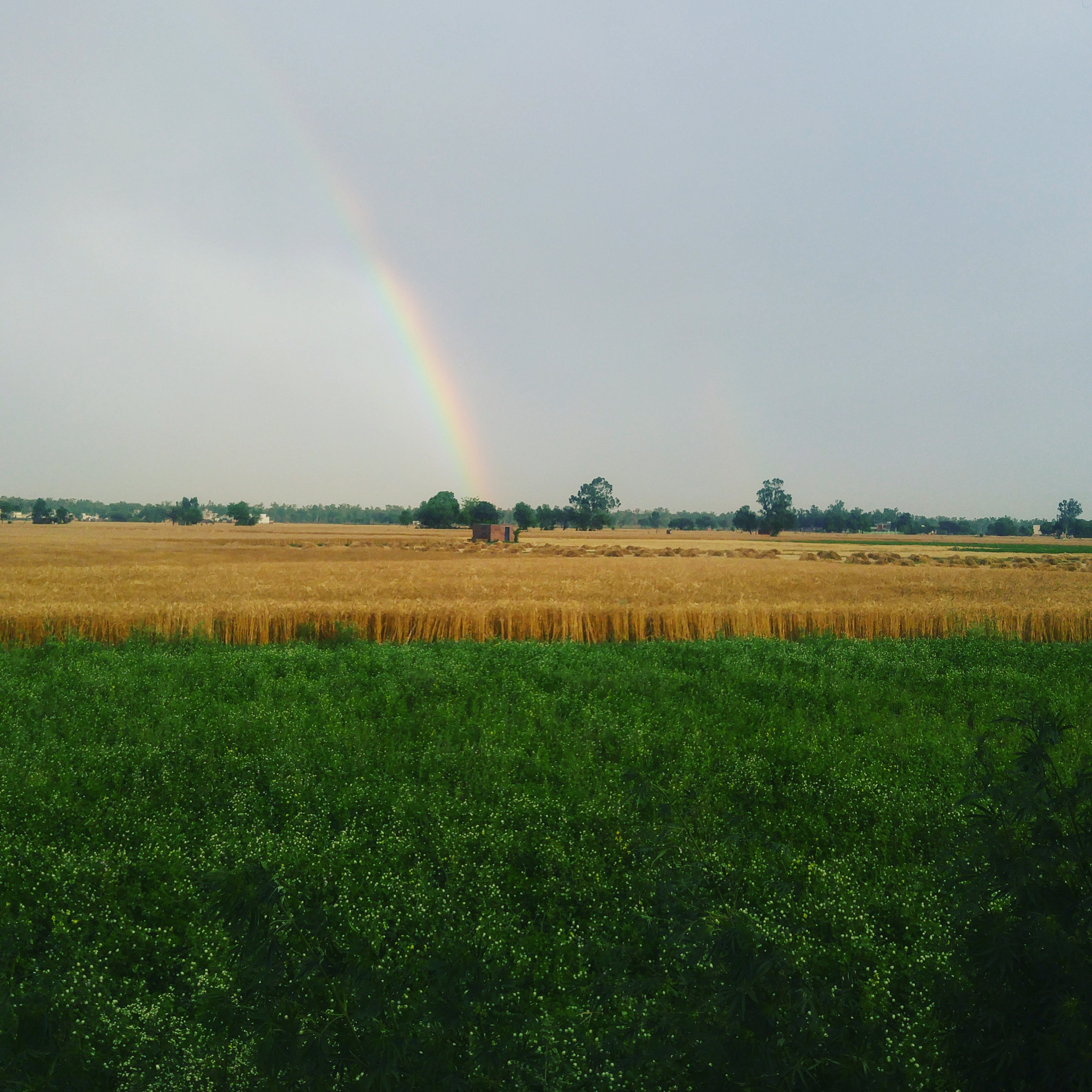
Yellow and green fields in Punjab

The majority of the population, directly or indirectly, is dependent on this sector, contributing about 23.0% of the gross domestic product (GDP) and accounting for 37.4% of the employed labor force in 2021. It is the largest source of foreign exchange earnings. The most important crops are wheat, sugarcane, cotton, and rice, accounting for more than 75% of the value of total crop output. Pakistan's largest food crop is wheat. In 2017, Pakistan produced 26,674,000 tonnes of wheat, almost equal to all of Africa (27.1 million tonnes) and more than all of South America (25.9 million tonnes), according to the FAOSTAT. In the market year of 2018/19, Pakistan exported a record 4.5 million tonnes of rice.

The Indus River dominates the water resources of Pakistan, transporting enormous quantities of nutrients and sediment to the continental shelf. Natural lakes, reservoirs, river systems and ponds cover 8 mil hectares.

The fishing industry plays a significant part in the national economy of Pakistan. With a coastline of about 650 miles (1,050 km), Pakistan has several fishery resources that have yet to be developed. Most of the coastal population of Sindh and Balochistan depends on fishing for their livelihood. It is also a major export.

The fishing industry is managed by the Fisheries Development Board (FDB) which is under the Ministry of National Food Security & Research, within the Government of Pakistan. The office of the FDB is responsible for promoting and managing Pakistan's fishing industry and coordinating with provincial fisheries departments and other national and international agencies, such as the Asia-Pacific Fishery Commission. The marine subsector is overseen by Marine Fisheries Department (MFD).

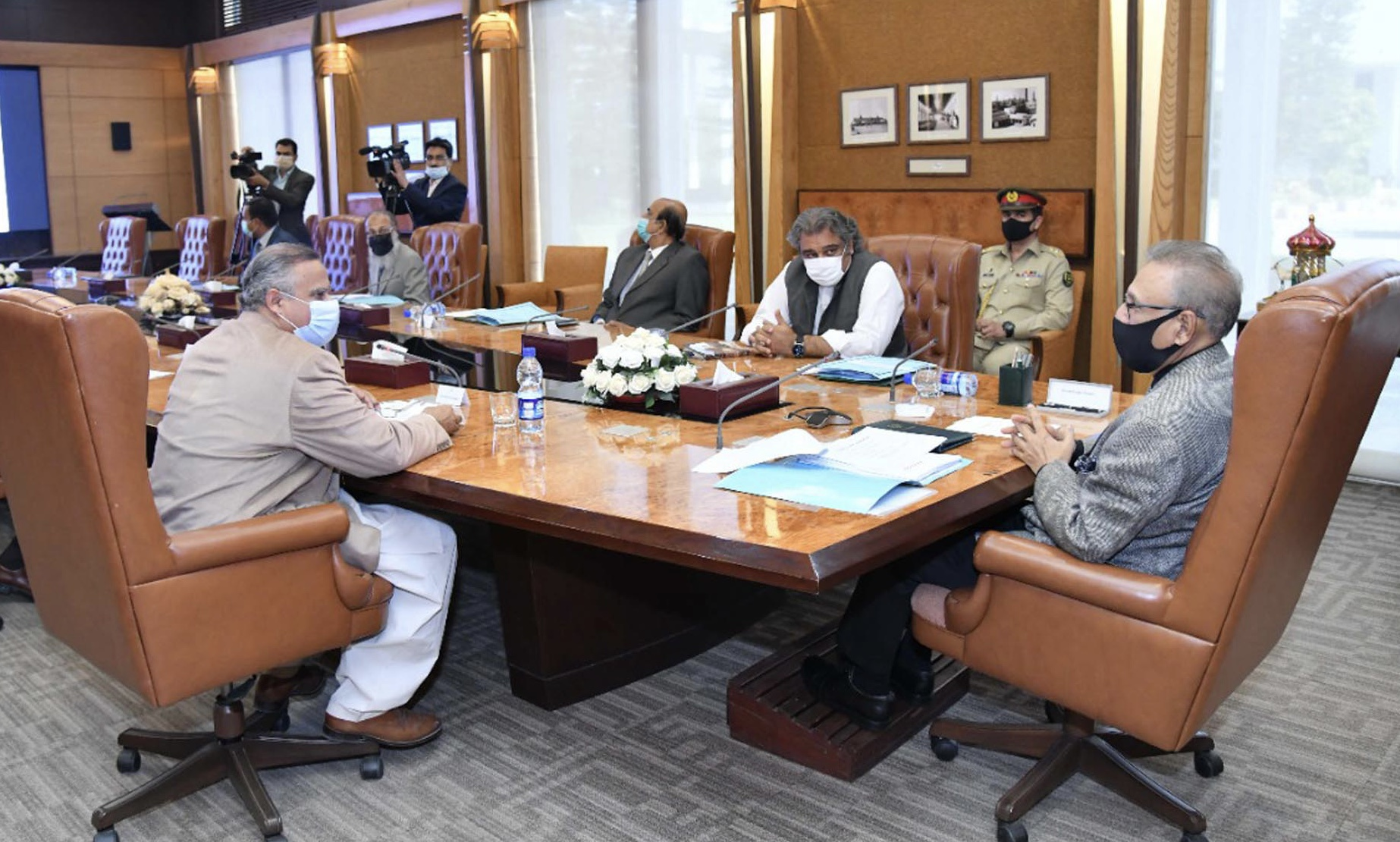
President Arif Alvi getting briefed on Deep Sea Fishing Policy by Maritime Secretary Rizwan Ahmed

The Pakistan Agricultural Research Council (PARC) is engaged in the research of the industry. Some universities in the country are also involved in basic fisheries research.

=== Industry ===
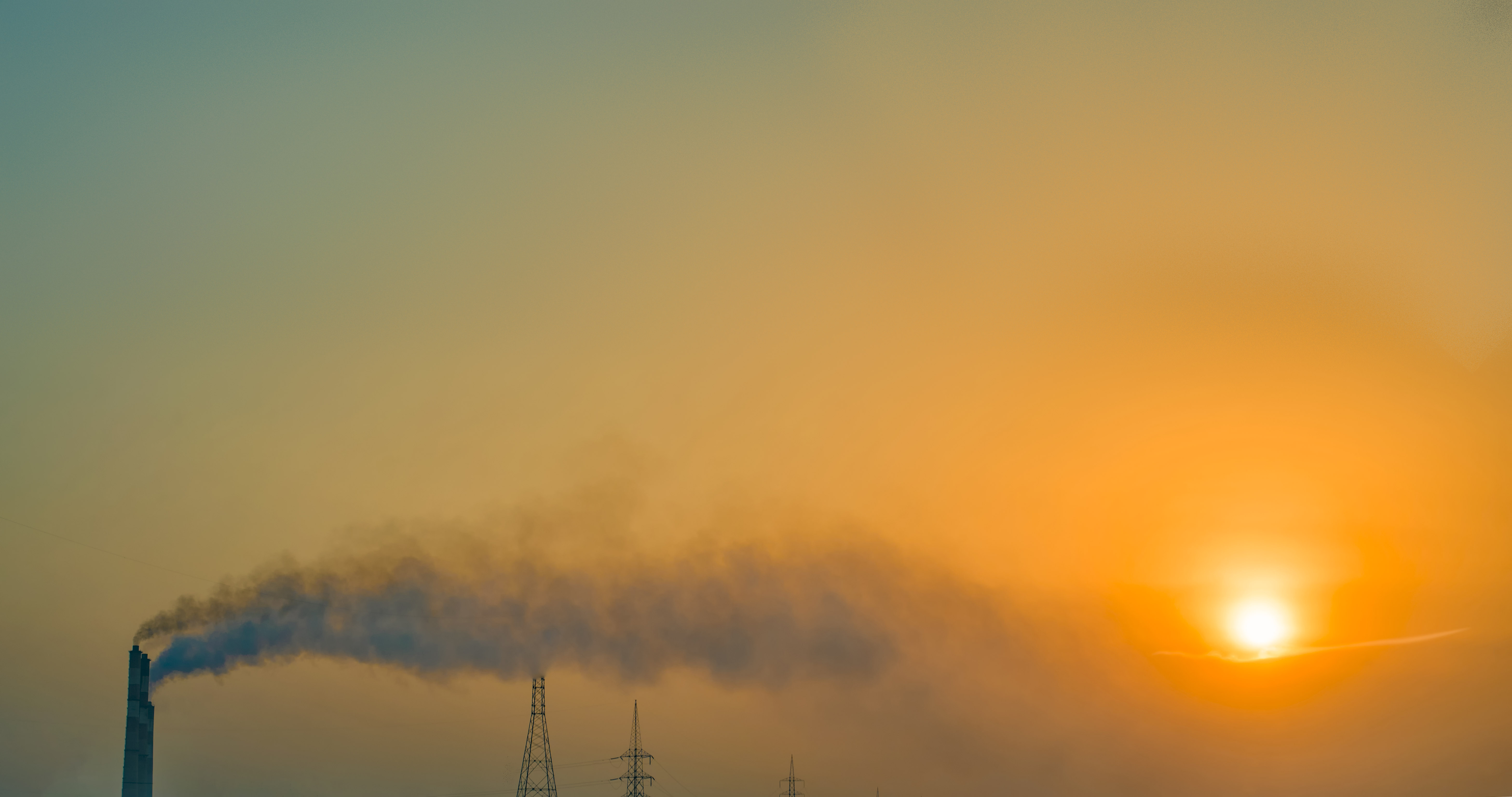
Factory in Pakistan

Pakistan's industrial sector accounts for approximately 19.12% of GDP. In 2021, it recorded a growth of 7.81%, compared to the negative 5.75% in 2020. The government is privatizing large-scale industrial units, and the public sector accounts for a shrinking proportion of industrial output, while growth in overall industrial output (including the private sector) has accelerated. Government policies aim to diversify the country's industrial base and bolster export industries. Large Scale Manufacturing is the fastest-growing sector in the Pakistani economy. Major industries include textiles, fertiliser, cement, oil refineries, dairy products, food processing, beverages, construction materials, clothing, paper products, and shrimp.

==== Manufacturing ====
Manufacturing is the largest of Pakistan's industrial sectors, accounting for approximately 12.13% of GDP. The manufacturing sub-sector is further divided into three components: large-scale manufacturing (LSM) with a share of 79.6% in the manufacturing sector, small-scale manufacturing with a share of 13.8% in the manufacturing sector, while slaughtering contributes 6.5% to manufacturing. Major sectors in industries include cement, fertiliser, edible oil, sugar, steel, tobacco, chemicals, machinery, food processing, and medical instruments, primarily surgical. Pakistan is one of the largest manufacturers and exporters of surgical instruments.

Pakistan's largest corporations are primarily engaged in utilities such as oil, gas, electricity, automobile, cement, food, chemicals, fertilizer, civil aviation, textile, and telecommunication. Their assets, sales, and profit/loss for the year 2023 are listed below:

===== Automobile =====
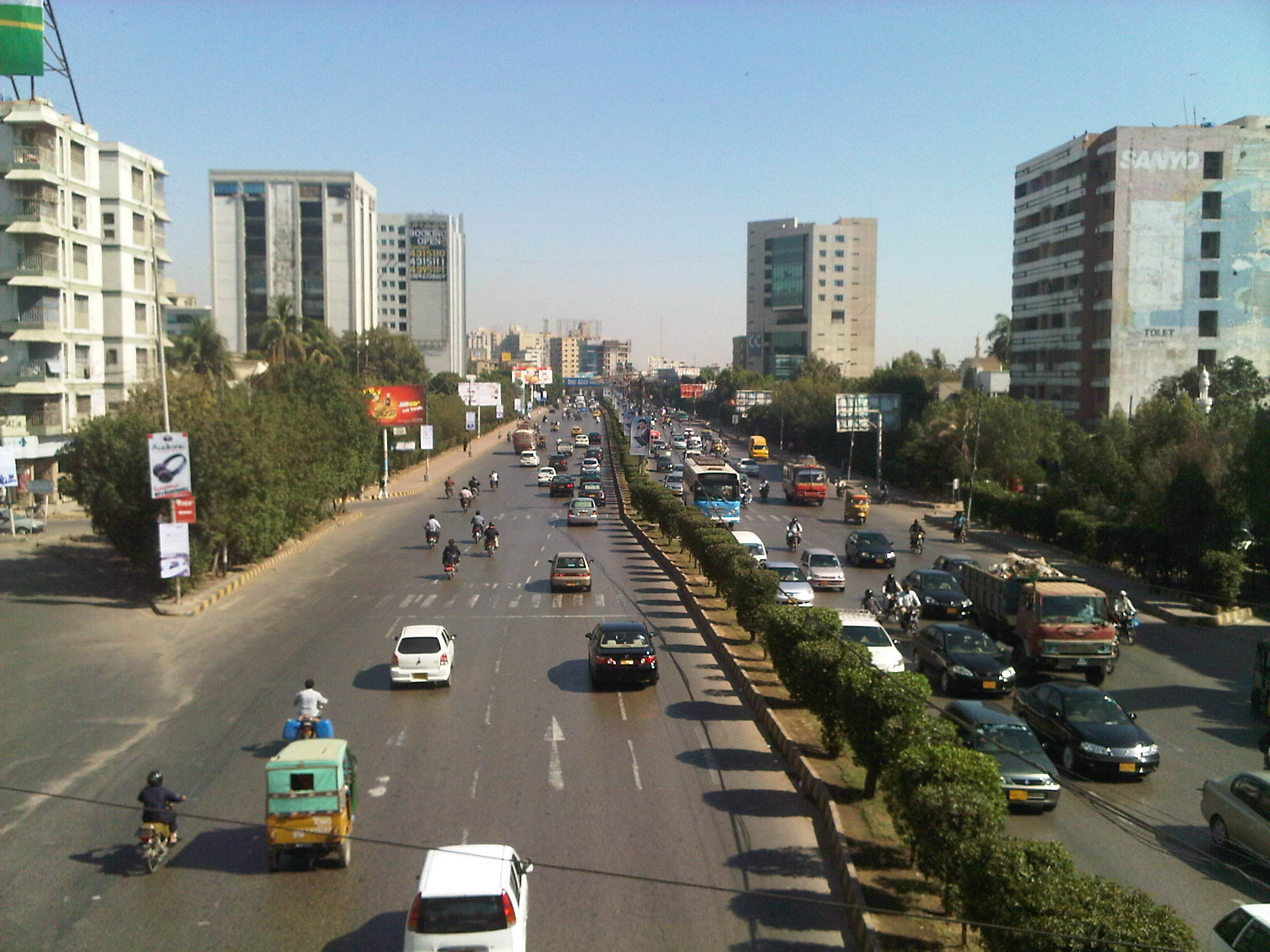
Cars on Shahrah-e-Faisal in Karachi

The auto sector constituted about 7 percent of LSM in 2021, contributing significantly to the country's industrial output. Given government support and the removal of obstacles, the industrial expansion is expected to yield positive results soon. Many new investors have joined with commercial production, while existing players have already made substantial investments, with more in the pipeline. Among the automakers yet to start production, Proton, MG, and Volkswagen are poised to make a significant impact in the local passenger vehicle market. Meanwhile, KIA, Hyundai, Changan, and Prince DFSK have already commenced productions in Pakistan.

===== Defence =====
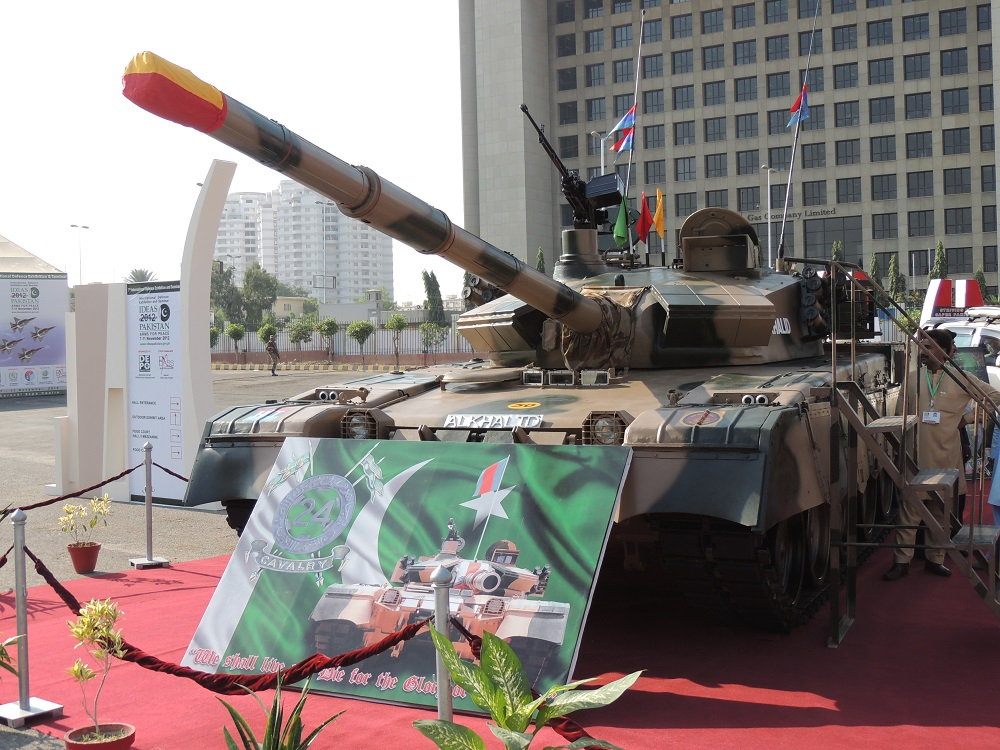
HIT-built Al-Khalid tank on display, 2012

The defence industry of Pakistan, under the Ministry of Defence Production, was established in September 1951 to promote and coordinate the array of military production facilities that have emerged since independence. It is actively engaged in numerous joint production projects, such as the Al Khalid 2 tank, advanced trainer aircraft, combat aircraft, artillery systems like MRLS, combat and surveillance drones like GIDS Shahpar-1 and Shahpar-2, battle management and surveillance radars, electronic warfare systems, navy ships, and submarines.

Pakistan manufactures and sells weapons to over 40 countries, including European customers, generating $620 million annually. The country's sophisticated arms imports increased by 119 percent between 2004–2008 and 2009–13, with China providing 54 percent and the USA 27 percent of Pakistan's imports.

===== Furniture =====
According to the World Trade Organization's statistics, Pakistan's exports of wooden furniture amounted to $51 million in 2011. The furniture industry in Pakistan is expanding, with many new companies joining the industry.

Pakistani furniture manufacturers have expertise in handmade furniture, and the type of wood used namely 'sheesham' (rosewood) adds to this furniture's demand. The leading manufacturing areas of wooden furniture in Pakistan are Chiniot, Gujrat, Peshawar, Lahore and Karachi.

===== Pharmaceutical =====
The pharmaceutical industry in Pakistan was estimated to be worth Rs. 748 billion (US$2.7 billion) in 2023, representing about 1% of the country's GDP. The industry is largely import-dependent, with more than 90% of raw material being imported and only 12% of active pharmaceutical ingredients locally produced. Pakistani pharmaceutical companies are engaged in importing raw materials, compounding active pharmaceutical ingredients with excipients, coating of pills, and fill-finish activities. The industry is regulated by the Drug Regulatory Authority of Pakistan, which oversees drug approvals and pricing.

Pakistan imports all specialized finished dosage forms, vaccines and biologicals. A report by the Institute of Chartered Accountants of Pakistan estimated that the Pakistani pharmaceutical industry has a 50-60% import reliance on India. Pakistan exported pharmaceutical products worth about $235 million in 2023, mostly to a few less-regulated markets in Africa and Southeast Asia.

===== Textile =====
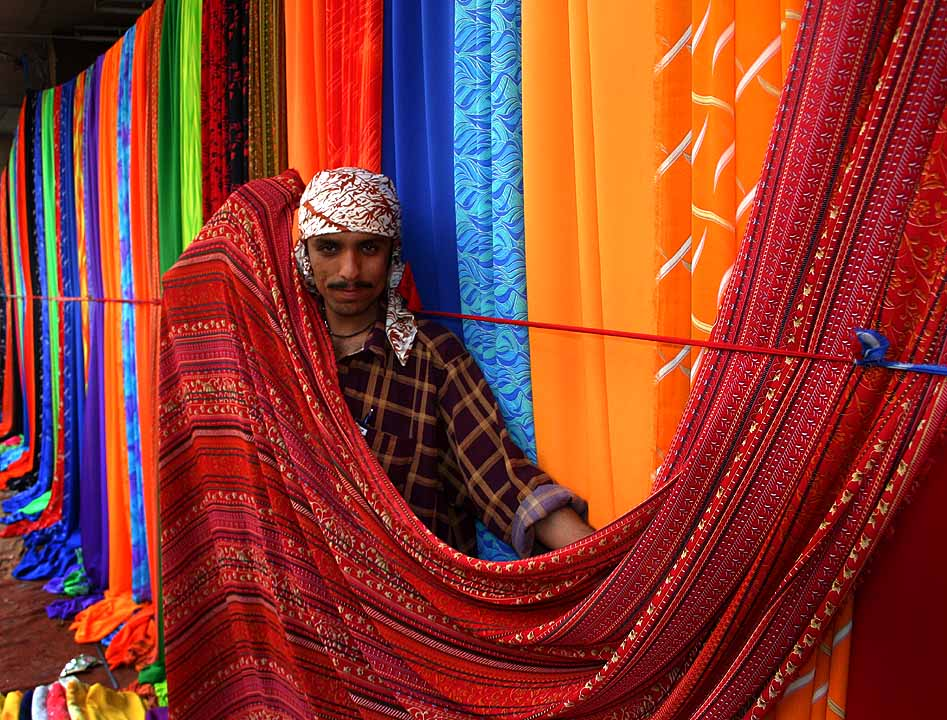
Sunday textile market on the sidewalks of Karachi, 2005.

Most of the textile industry is concentrated in Punjab. Before 1990, the industry was predominantly located in Karachi. The industry comprises two main segments: a highly organized large-scale sector and a considerably fragmented cottage/small-scale sector. The organized sector mainly includes integrated Textile Mills, housing numerous spinning units and a limited number of shuttle-less loom units. Conversely, the unorganized sector encompasses downstream industries like Weaving, Finishing, Garment, Towels, and Hosiery, all of which possess significant export potential. Within this sector, certain enterprises have expanded to an international scale and exhibit progressive business philosophies.

As of June 2021, the Pakistani textile industry comprised 517 textile units, including 40 composite units and 477 spinning units. This landscape also included 28,500 shuttle-less looms and 375,000 conventional looms. The growth of the spinning sector has been fueled by export demands and cotton production, with subsequent growth observed in the weaving and processing sector. Notably, independent air-jet weaving units have emerged, both as standalone entities and in conjunction with spinning or processing units.

==== Mining ====
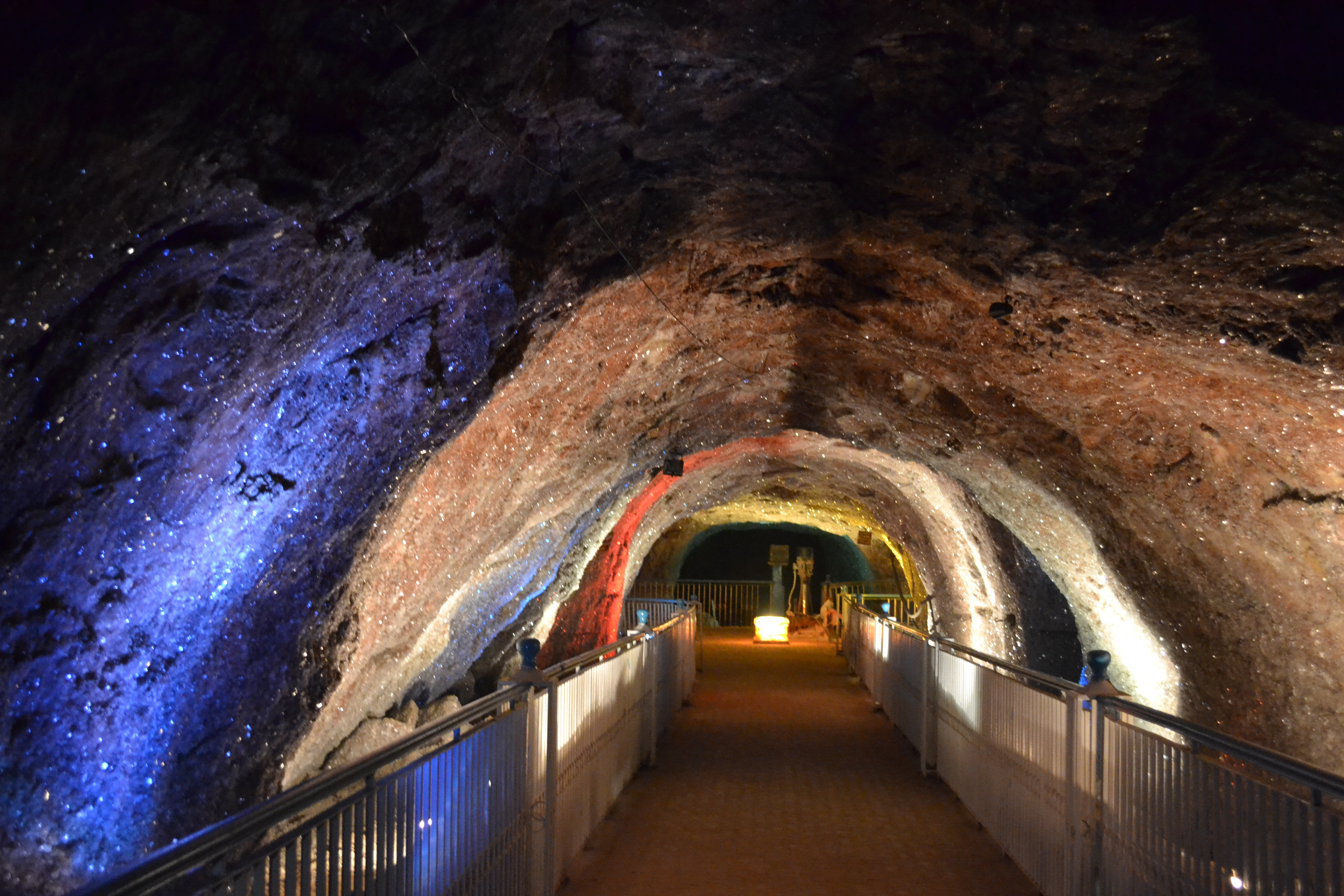
Khewra Salt Mine in the Jhelum District

Pakistan is endowed with significant mineral resources and is emerging as a very promising area for prospecting/exploration for mineral deposits. In the wake of the 18th amendment to the constitution, all the provinces are free to exploit and explore the mineral resources within their jurisdiction. Mining and quarrying contribute 13.19% to the industrial sector, with its share in GDP being 2.4%.

==== Energy ====
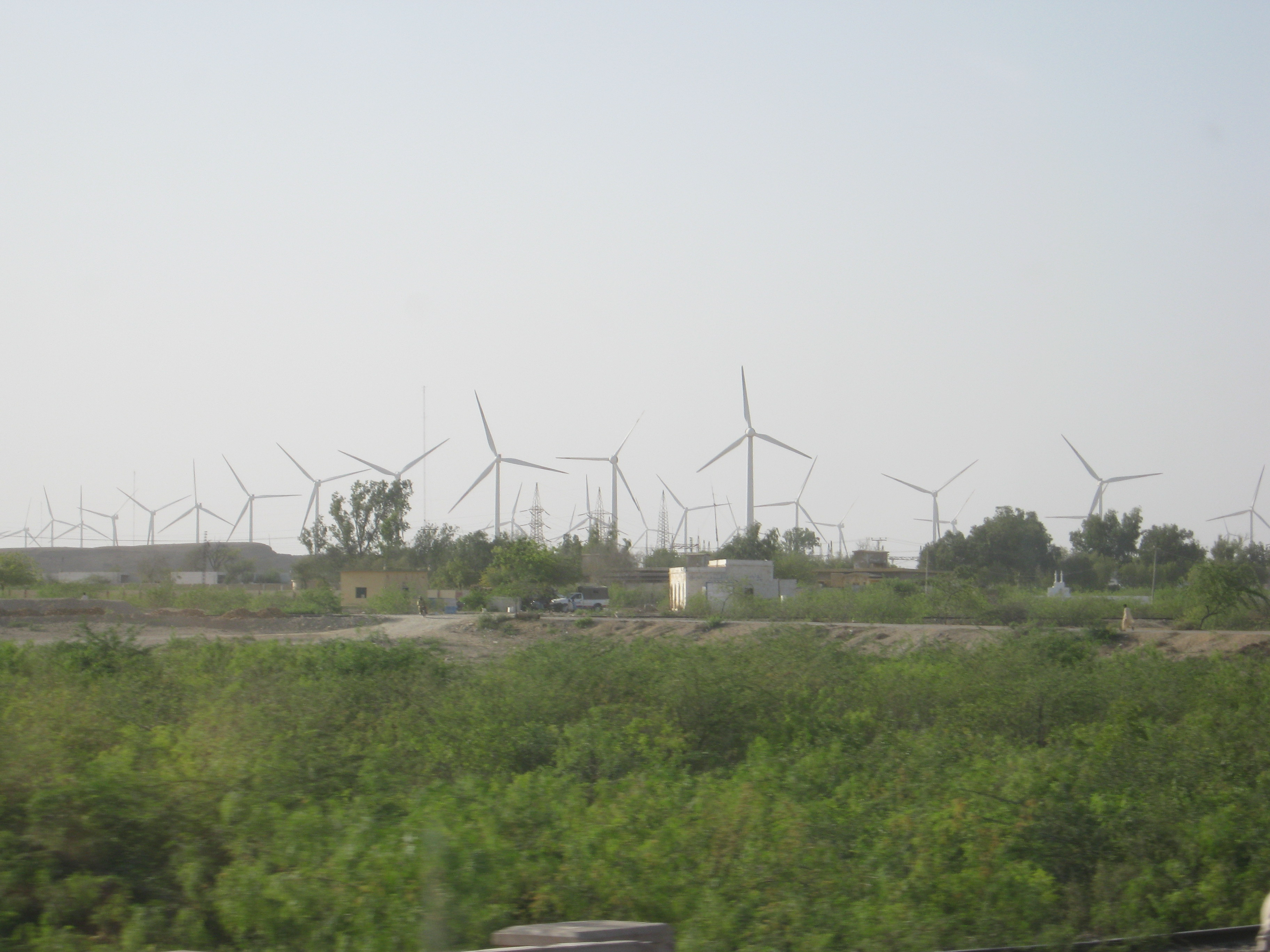
Wind power plants near Jamshoro, Sindh

The main sources of Pakistan's primary energy supplies are gas, oil, coal, liquefied natural gas (LNG), and hydroelectricity, with shares of 29%, 24%, 15%, 10%, and 11% respectively in 2022. Since coal mining began in the Thar desert and LNG imports from Qatar, coal and imported LNG increased their shares manyfold in just five years in the primary energy supplies of the country. The share of gas has decreased from 50% in 2005 to 24% in 2022, and oil, since 2015, from 35% to 27% in 2022, being largely replaced by coal and LNG. As Pakistan intends to generate around 8,800 megawatts of nuclear power by 2030, its share is also increasing gradually.

=== Services ===
Pakistan's service sector contributes approximately 61.7% to the GDP. Within this sector, transport, storage, communications, finance, and insurance comprise 24%, while wholesale and retail trade constitute about 30%. Pakistan is actively promoting the growth of the information industry and other modern service industries by offering incentives such as long-term tax holidays.

==== Education ====
Literacy Rate in each Pakistani District as of the 2017 Pakistan Census

Education in Pakistan is administered by the Federal Ministry of Education and the provincial governments. The federal government primarily plays a coordinating role, including curriculum development, accreditation and the financing of research and development. while the provinces are responsible for the implementation and management of educational institutions.

Article 25-A of the Constitution of Pakistan obligates the state to provide free and compulsory education to all children between the ages of five and sixteen years, in a manner prescribed by law."

The education system in Pakistan is generally divided into six levels: preschool (from the age of 3 to 5), primary (years one to five), middle (years six to eight), secondary (years nine and ten, leading to the Secondary School Certificate or SSC), intermediate (years eleven and twelve, leading to a Higher Secondary School Certificate or HSSC), and university programmes leading to undergraduate and graduate degrees. The Higher Education Commission established in 2002 is responsible for all universities and degree awarding institutes. It was established in 2002 with Atta-ur-Rahman as its founding chairman.

Pakistan still has a low literacy rate relative to other countries. As of 2022 Pakistan's literacy rates range from 96% in Islamabad to 23% in the Torghar District. Literacy rates vary by gender and region. In tribal areas female literacy is 9.5%, while Azad Kashmir has a literacy rate of 91%. Pakistan's population of children not in school (22.8 million children) is the second largest in the world after Nigeria. According to the data, Pakistan faces a significant unemployment challenge, particularly among its educated youth, with over 31% of them being unemployed. Moreover, women account for 51% of the overall unemployed population, highlighting a gender disparity in employment opportunities. Pakistan produces about 445,000 university graduates and 25,000 to 30,000 computer science graduates per year As of 2021.

According to a Gallup Pakistan analysis based on the Pakistan Bureau of Statistics National Census Report 2023, educational attainment in Pakistan remains heavily skewed toward lower levels despite long-term gains in literacy. The data show that 67.5% of the population remains below matriculation, while only 9.39% hold a bachelor's degree or higher. Within this group, 4.29% possess a two-year BA, 1.86% a four-year degree, and 3.24% hold postgraduate qualifications (master's, MPhil, or PhD). The findings indicate that access to higher education remains limited and uneven, reinforcing structural inequalities in social mobility. The analysis highlights pronounced urban–rural disparities. Postgraduate attainment stands at 6.18% in urban areas, compared with 1.27% in rural Pakistan, making urban residents more than twice as likely to hold a university degree. While gender parity exists at the national level in undergraduate attainment, this balance is largely driven by major cities. Rural women emerge as the most disadvantaged group, facing persistent barriers related to access, mobility, and institutional availability. Significant provincial inequalities are also evident. The Islamabad Capital Territory leads with approximately 17% of residents holding a university degree, followed by Punjab (~7%), Sindh (~5.5%), Khyber Pakhtunkhwa (~4%), and Balochistan (~2.5%), reflecting uneven distribution of educational infrastructure and economic opportunity. Although women in metropolitan areas increasingly outperform men at the postgraduate level, this progress is geographically concentrated and does not extend to much of rural Pakistan. Gallup Pakistan concludes that, given Pakistan's young demographic profile (with more than 60% of the population under the age of 30) the country risks developing an under-skilled workforce unless transitions into secondary and tertiary education improve. Expanding university access, addressing rural and provincial disparities, and aligning higher education with labor-market needs are identified as critical to realizing Pakistan's demographic potential.

==== Finance ====
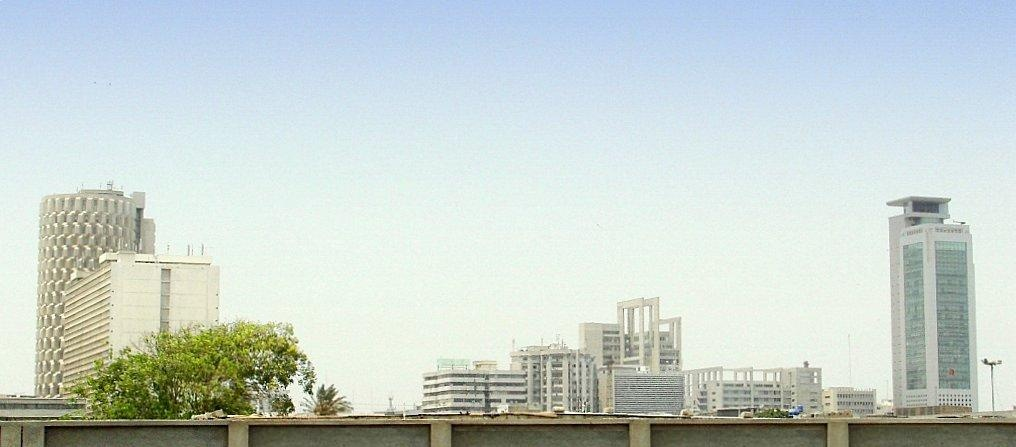
A part of Downtown Karachi, Showing the MCB Tower and Habib Bank Plaza, 2004.

Pakistan has a large and diverse banking system. In 1974, a nationalization programme led to the creation of six government-owned banks. A privatization programme in the 1990s led to the entry of foreign-owned and local banks into the industry. As of 2010, there were five publicly owned commercial banks in Pakistan, as well as 25 domestic private banks, six multinational banks, and four specialised banks.

==== Healthcare ====
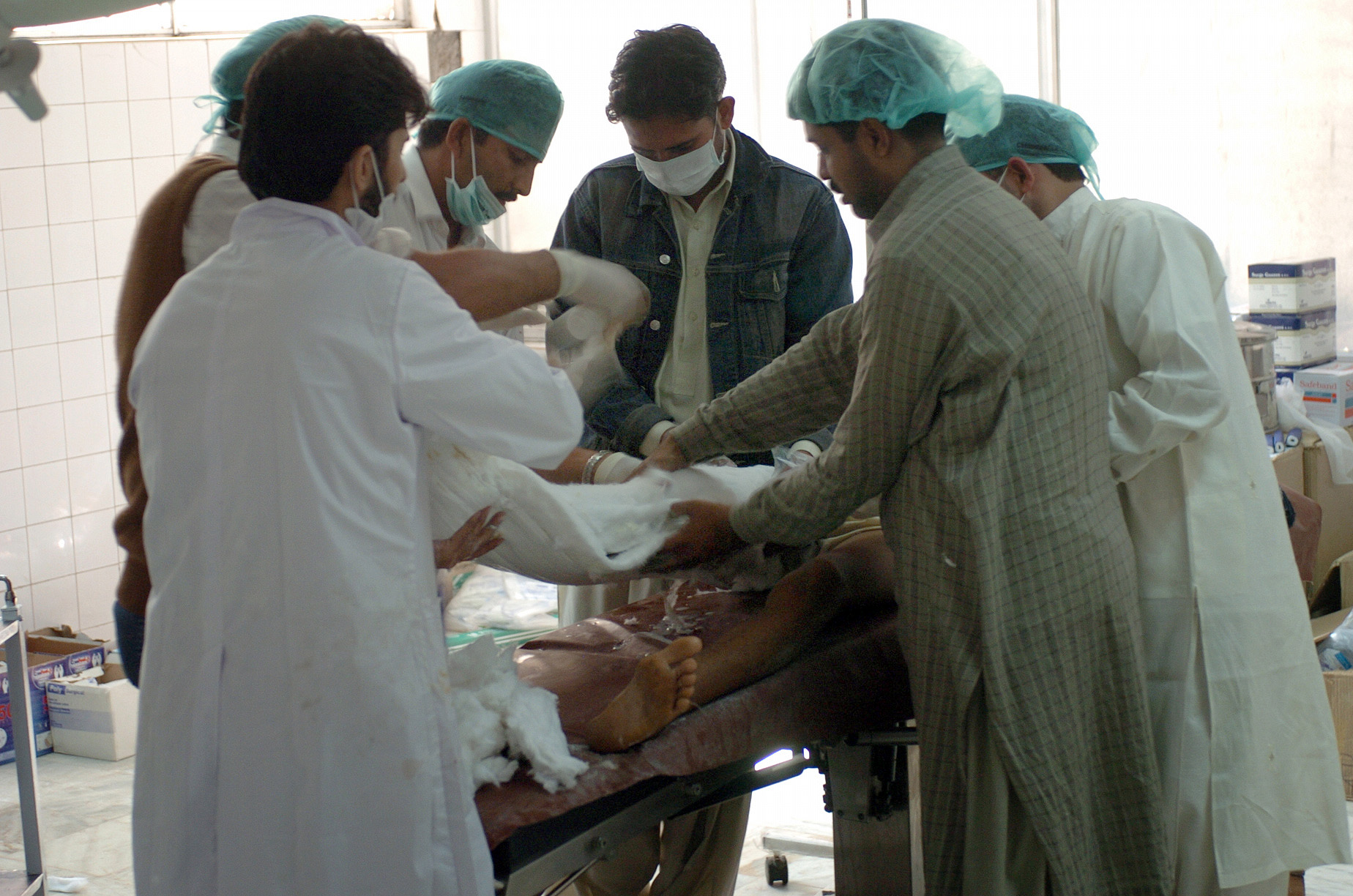
Pakistani doctors operate on an injured woman in Muzafarabad in 2005

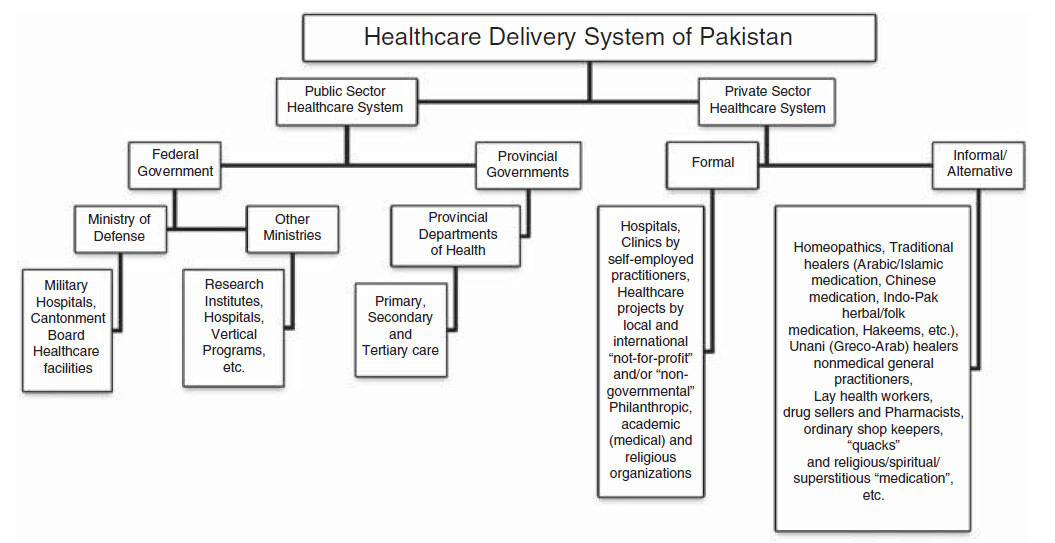
Healthcare Delivery System of Pakistan

The healthcare delivery system of Pakistan is complex, as it includes healthcare subsystems by federal governments, provincial governments, and the private sector healthcare systems. Healthcare is delivered mainly through vertically managed disease-specific mechanisms. The different institutions that are responsible for this include: provincial and district health departments, parastatal organizations, social security institutions, non-governmental organizations (NGOs) and private sector. The country's health sector is also marked by urban-rural disparities in healthcare delivery and an imbalance in the health workforce, with insufficient health managers, nurses, paramedics and skilled birth attendants in the peripheral areas. Pakistan's gross national income per capita in 2021 was 1,506 USD. In the health budget, the total expenditure per capita on health in 2021 was only 28.3 billion, constituting 1.4% of the country's GDP. The health care delivery system in Pakistan consists of public and private sectors. Under the constitution, health is primarily responsibility of the provincial government, except in the federally administered areas. Health care delivery has traditionally been jointly administered by the federal and provincial governments with districts mainly responsible for implementation. Service delivery is being organized through preventive, promotive, curative and rehabilitative services. The curative and rehabilitative services are being provided mainly at the secondary and tertiary care facilities. Preventive and promotive services, on the other hand, are mainly provided through various national programs; and community health workers’ interfacing with the communities through primary healthcare facilities and outreach activities. The state provides healthcare through a three-tiered healthcare delivery system and a range of public health interventions. Some government/ semi government organizations like the armed forces, Sui Gas, WAPDA, Railways, Fauji Foundation, Employees Social Security Institution and NUST provide health service to their employees and their dependants through their own system, however, these collectively cover about 10% of the population. The private health sector constitutes a diverse group of doctors, nurses, pharmacists, traditional healers, drug vendors, as well as laboratory technicians, shopkeepers and unqualified practitioners.

Development of life expectancy in Pakistan

Despite the increase in public health facilities, Pakistan's population growth has generated an unmet need for healthcare. Public healthcare institutions that address critical health issues are often only located in major towns and cities. Due to the absence of these institutions and the cost associated with transportation, impoverished people living in rural and remote areas tend to consult private doctors. Studies have shown that Pakistan's private sector healthcare system is outperforming the public sector healthcare system in terms of service quality and patient satisfaction, with 70% of the population being served by the private health sector. The private health sector operates through a fee-for-service system of unregulated hospitals, medical practitioners, homeopathic doctors, hakeems, and other spiritual healers. In urban areas, some public-private partnerships exist for franchising private sector outlets and contributing to overall service delivery. Very few mechanisms exist to regulate the quality, standards, protocols, ethics, or prices within the private health sector, that results in disparities in health services.

Even though nurses play a key role in any country's health care field, Pakistan has only 105,950 nurses to service a population of 241.49 million people, leaving a shortfall of nurses as per World Health Organization (WHO) estimates. As per the Economic Survey of Pakistan (2020–21), the country is spending 1.2% of the GDP on healthcare which is less than the healthcare expenditure recommended by WHO i.e. 5% of GDP.

==== Housing and real estate ====
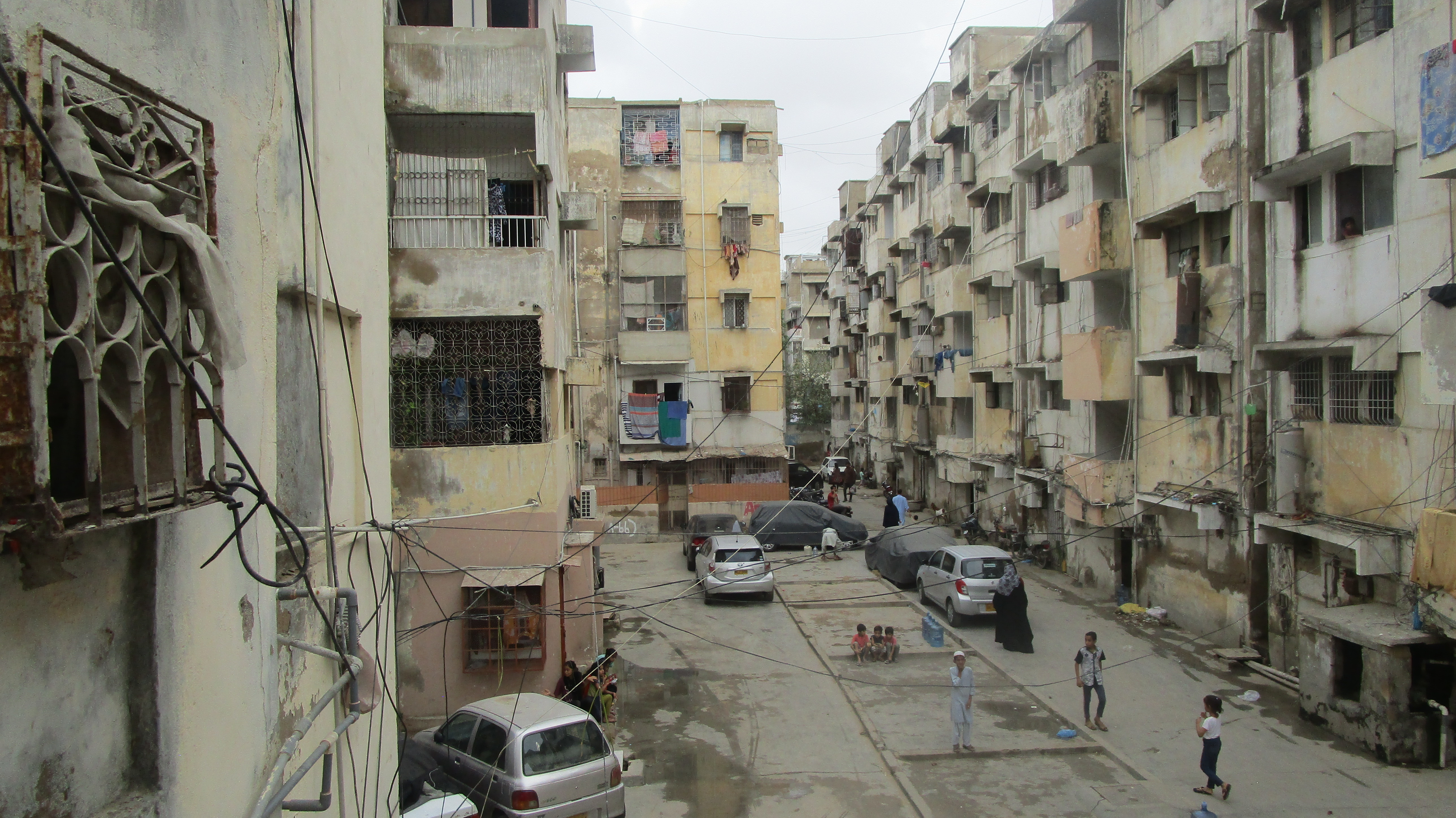
A square full of middle-class apartment buildings in Gulshan-e-Iqbal, Karachi.

Housing in Pakistan generally consists of three classes: pakka houses (पक्का/پکّا pakkā, lit. '"ripe"'), which are made of strong materials like brick and cement; katchi houses (کچی kachē, lit. '"unripe, semi-made, unsure"'), which are made of less-permanent materials such as thatch and bamboo; and semi-pakka houses, which are a mix of the pakka and katchi types.

Housing in Pakistan has always been insufficient due to a growing population (which is 241.49 million as per the 2023 Pakistani Census) and accelerated by urbanisation combined with the housing problem being low-priority in the eyes of the government. Housing is an important element of real estate in Pakistan.

==== Telecommunications ====
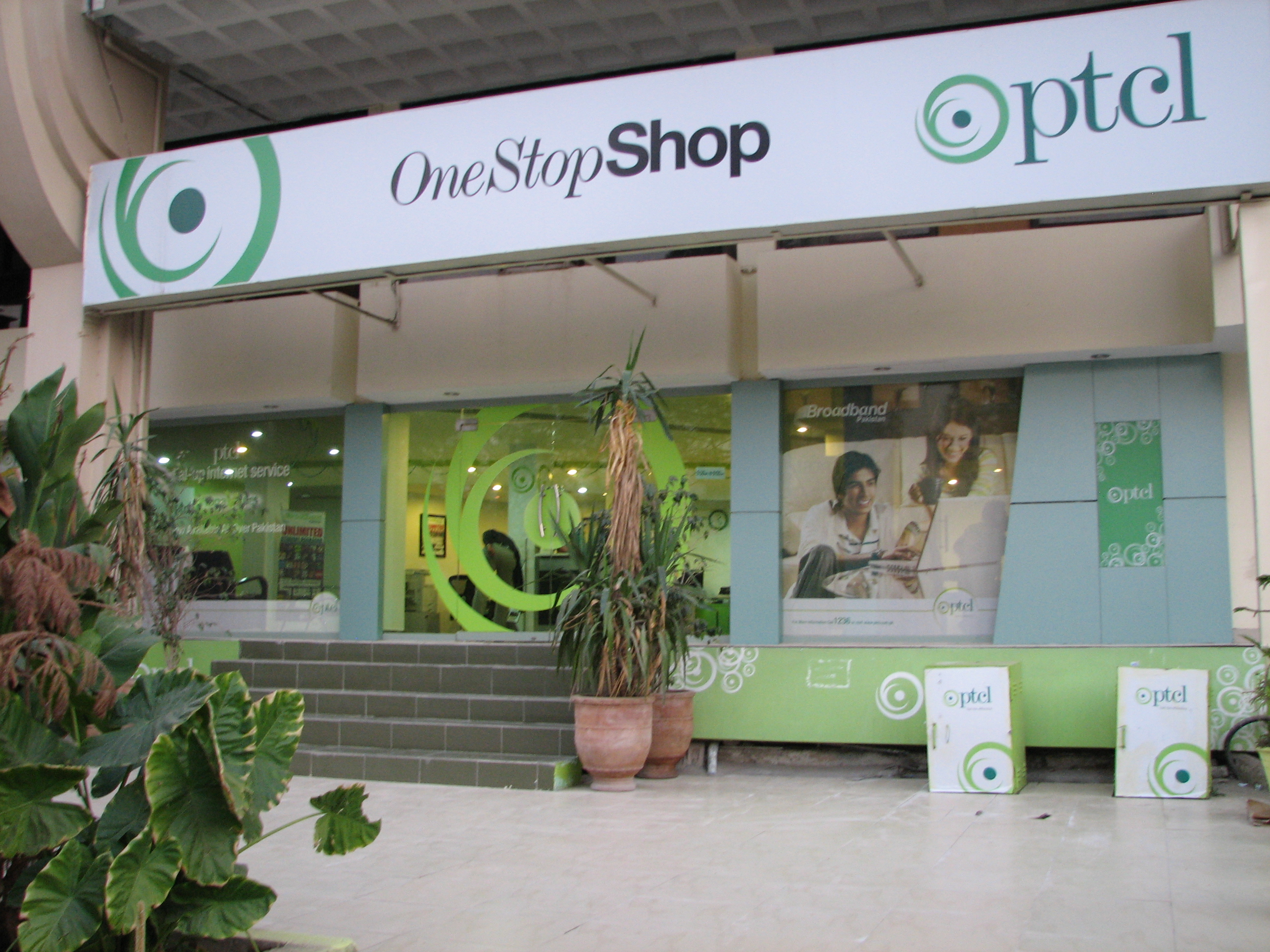
PTCL's One Stop Shop in Islamabad, 2008.

After the deregulation of the telecommunications industry, the sector has experienced exponential growth. Pakistan Telecommunication Company Ltd (PTCL) has emerged as a successful Forbes 2000 conglomerate with over US$1 billion in sales in 2005. The mobile telephone market has expanded many-fold since 2003, reaching a subscriber base of 140 million users in July 2017, one of the highest mobile teledensities in the world. Pakistan won the prestigious Government Leadership award of GSM Association in 2006.

==== Information technology ====
Information technology (IT) in Pakistan is a thriving industry with significant potential for growth. The Ministry of Information Technology oversees its development. Despite financial crises, the IT sector has consistently demonstrated economic success.

==== Tourism ====
Tourism in Pakistan has attracted 90 million tourists to the country. Pakistan ranks 130th in the world by tourist income. Due to the threat of terrorism, the number of foreign tourists has gradually declined, and the shock of the 2013 Nanga Parbat tourist shooting has severely adversely affected the tourism industry. As of 2016, tourism has begun to recover in Pakistan, albeit gradually, with a current global rank of 130.

==== Transportation ====
===== Ground linkage =====
National Highways of Pakistan (Urdu: پاکستان کی قومی شاہراہ) are a network of toll highways in Pakistan, which are owned, maintained and operated by the National Highway Authority under the Ministry of Communications. It maintains 12,131 kilometres (7,538 mi) of roadways organized into various classifications which crisscross the country and provide access to major population centers. National Highways are not to be confused with provincial highways, which are roads maintained by the respective provinces. Pakistan's national highways include the famous Grand Trunk Road, Indus Highway, Karakoram Highway and Makran Coastal Highway.

All national highways in Pakistan are pre-fixed with the letter 'N' (for "national") followed by the unique numerical designation of the specific highway (with a hyphen in the middle), e.g. "N-5". Each numerical designation is separated by five numerals, i.e. N-5, N-10, N-15, etc. National Highways are distinct from Strategic Highways, which begin with the prefix 'S' and are controlled and operated by the Ministry of Defence.

National Highway Network Map

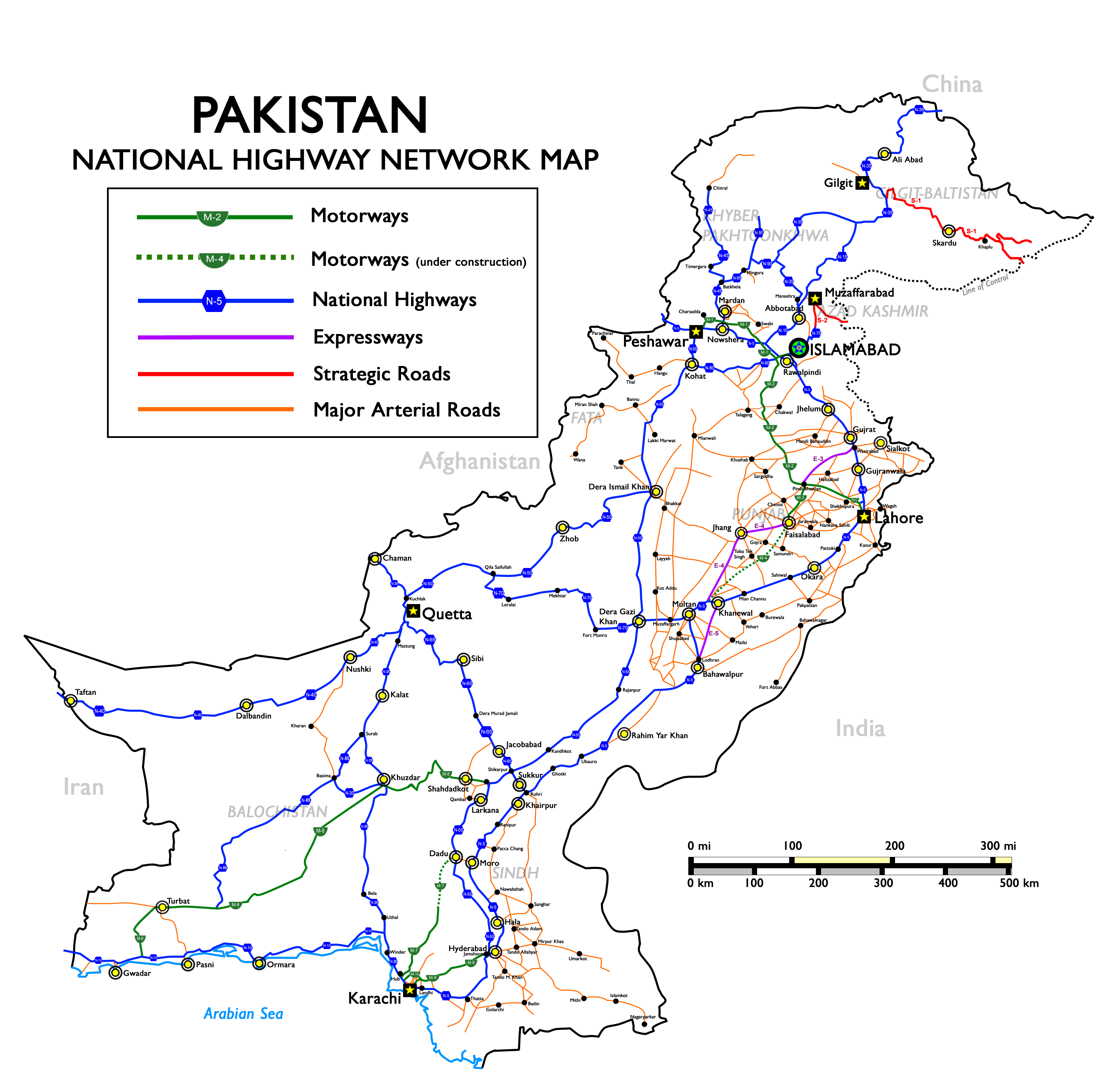
Map of Motorways of Pakistan

===== Rail linkage =====
Rail transport in Pakistan began in 1855 during the British Raj, when several railway companies began laying track and operating in present-day Pakistan. The country's rail system has been nationalised as Pakistan Railways (originally the Pakistan Western Railway). The system was originally a patchwork of local rail lines operated by small private companies, including the Scinde, Punjab and Delhi Railways and the Indus Steam Flotilla. In 1870, the four companies were amalgamated as the Scinde, Punjab & Delhi Railway. Several other rail lines were built shortly thereafter, including the Sind–Sagar and Trans–Baluchistan Railways and the Sind–Pishin, Indus Valley, Punjab Northern and Kandahar State Railways. These six companies and the Scinde, Punjab & Delhi Railway merged to form the North Western State Railway in 1886. It was later renamed as North-Western Railway in 1905, and few decades following the independence of Pakistan in 1947, the North Western Railway which mostly became part of Pakistani territory was renamed Pakistan Western Railway in 1961. It was later renamed as Pakistan Railways in 1974.

===== Air linkage =====
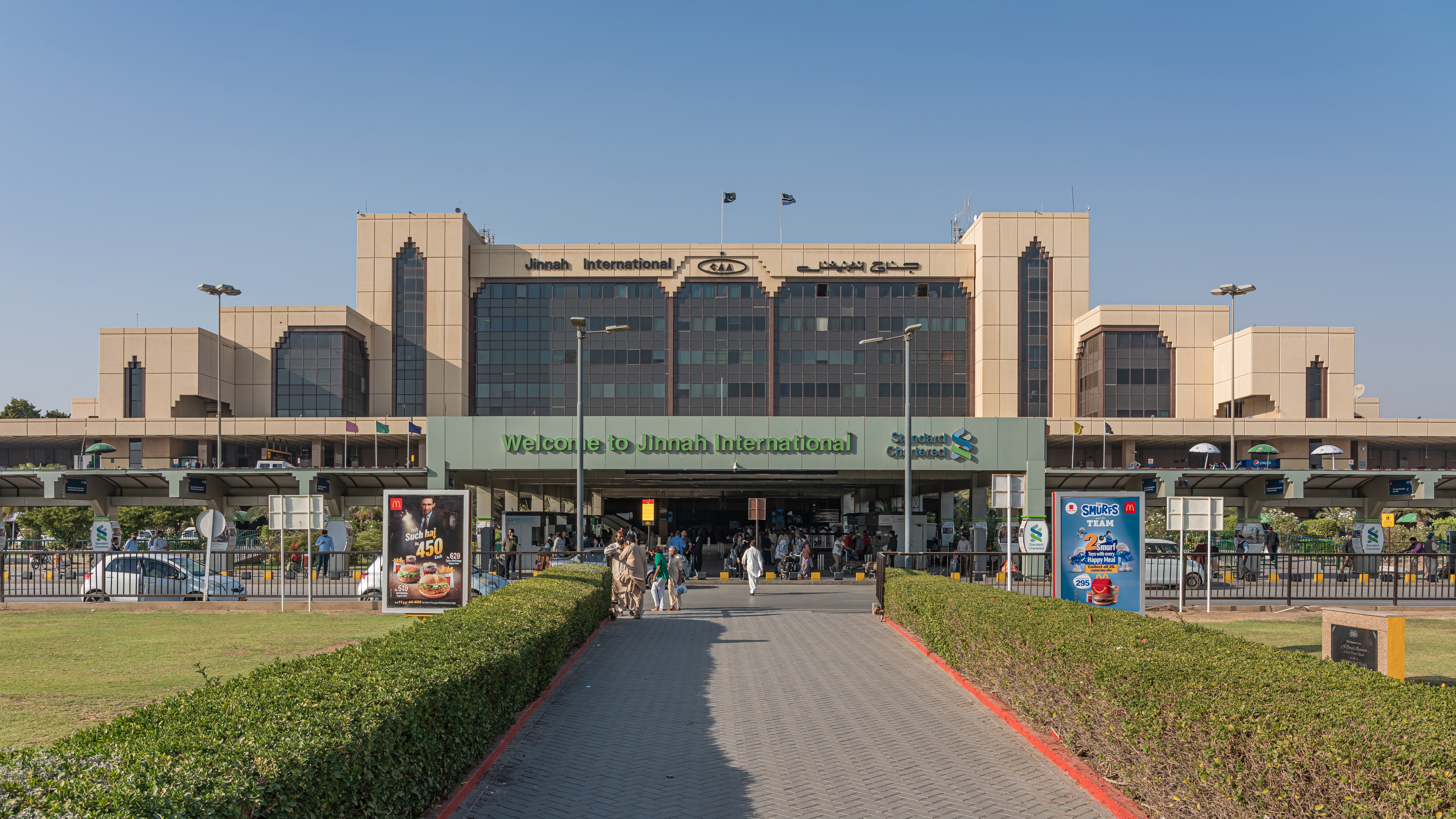
Jinnah International Airport in Karachi.

The year 1955 marked the inauguration of the Pakistan airline's first scheduled international service – to London, via Cairo and Rome. In 1959, the Government of Pakistan appointed Air Commodore Nur Khan as the managing director of PIA. With his visionary leadership, PIA 'took off' and within a short span of 6 years, gained the stature and status of one of the world's frontline carriers. In aviation circles, this period has often been referred to as the "golden years of PIA". On 29 April 1964, with a Boeing 720B, PIA earned the distinction of becoming the first airline from a non-communist country to fly into the People's Republic of China. Private sector airlines in Pakistan include Airblue, which serves the main cities within Pakistan in addition to destinations in the Persian Gulf and Manchester in the United Kingdom.

===== Maritime linkage =====
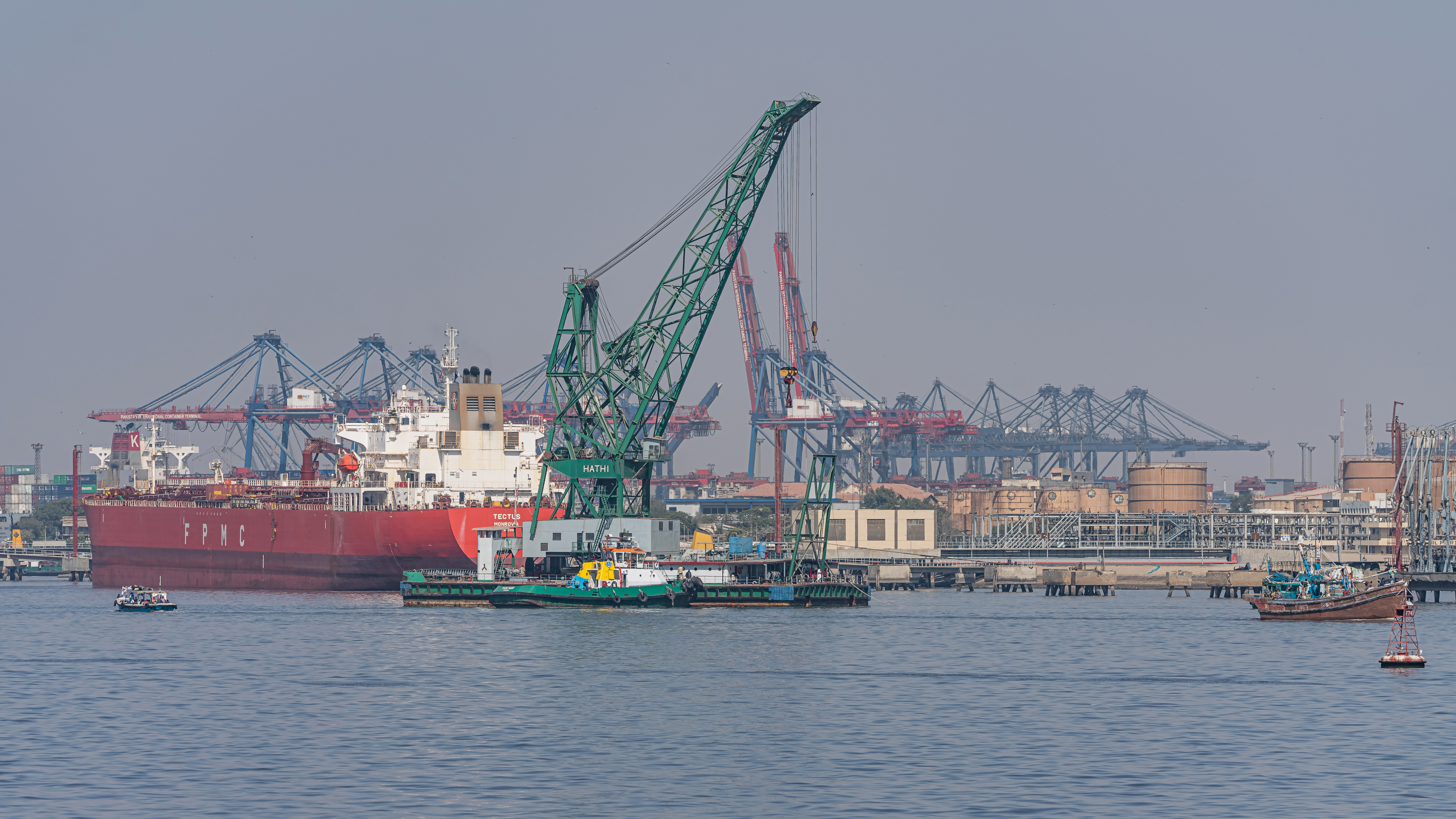
Port of Karachi in Sindh

Pakistan National Shipping Corporation (PNSC) is a national flag carrier. It was formed through the merger of the National Shipping Corporation and Pakistan Shipping Corporation in 1979. PNSC has had worldwide operations in the dry bulk segment of the shipping market since its inception, and has been involved in the transportation of liquid cargo since 1998, both locally and internationally. The corporation's head office is located in Karachi. Currently, the PNSC fleet comprises eleven vessels of various types and sizes (five bulk carriers, four Aframax tankers, and two LR-1 Clean Product tankers) with a total deadweight capacity (cargo carrying capacity) of 831,711 metric tons, the highest ever carrying capacity since the inception of PNSC.

== Foreign trade ==
=== Investment ===
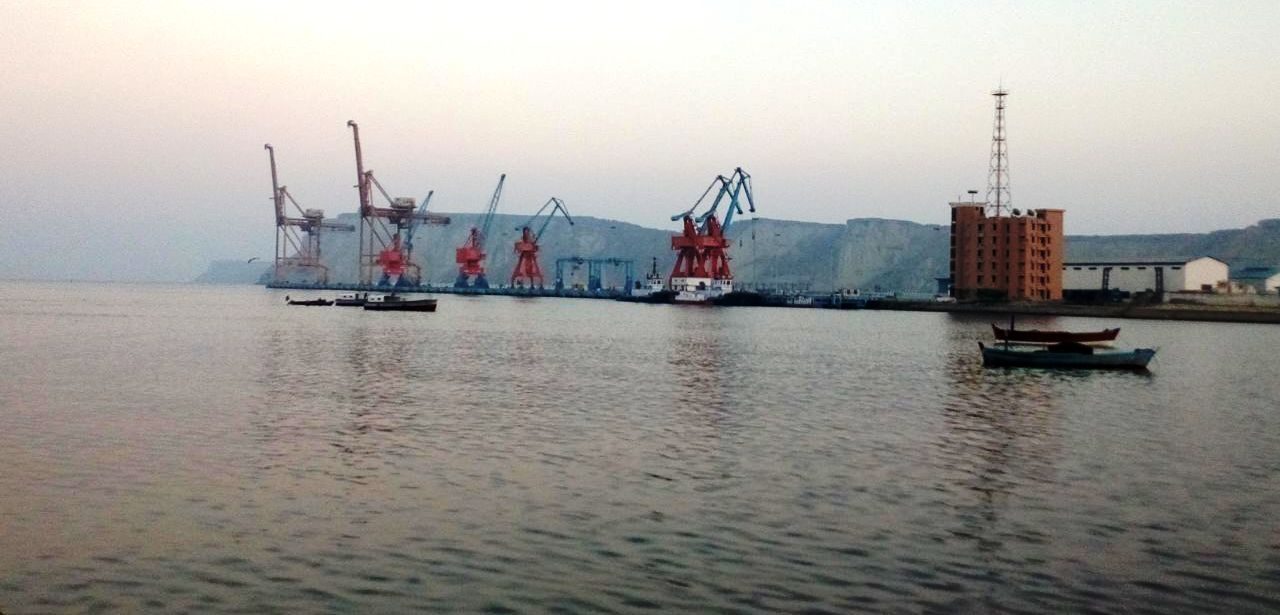
Gwader port in Balochistan

Foreign investment significantly declined by 2010, dropping by 54.6% due to Pakistan's political instability and weak law and order, according to the Bank of Pakistan.

=== Economic aid ===
Pakistan receives economic aid from several sources as loans and grants. The International Monetary Fund (IMF), World Bank (WB), and the Asian Development Bank (ADB) provide long-term loans to Pakistan. Pakistan receives bilateral aid from developed and oil-rich countries. Foreign aid has been one of the main sources of money for the Pakistani economy.

=== Remittances ===
The remittances of Pakistanis living abroad have played an important role in Pakistan's economy and foreign exchange reserves. Pakistanis settled in Western Europe and North America are significant sources of remittances to Pakistan. Since 1973, Pakistani workers in the oil-rich Arab states have been sources of billions of dollars of remittances. The 9 million-strong Pakistani diaspora contributed US$19.3 billion to the economy in 2017.

Remittances sent home by overseas Pakistanis in the fiscal year 2021 are as follows:

Country	(billion US$)
Saudi Arabia	7.667
UAE	6.114
UK	4.067
Gulf Cooperation Council	3.310
USA	2.754
European Union	2.709
Australia	0.594
Canada	0.586
Malaysia	0.204
Norway	0.111
Japan	0.085
Switzerland	0.041
Other countries	1.130

== Economic issues ==
=== Taxation ===
In fiscal year 2023, tax exemptions and concessions granted to influential sectors such as real estate, manufacturing and energy, cost the state 4.61 percent of GDP.

=== Corruption ===
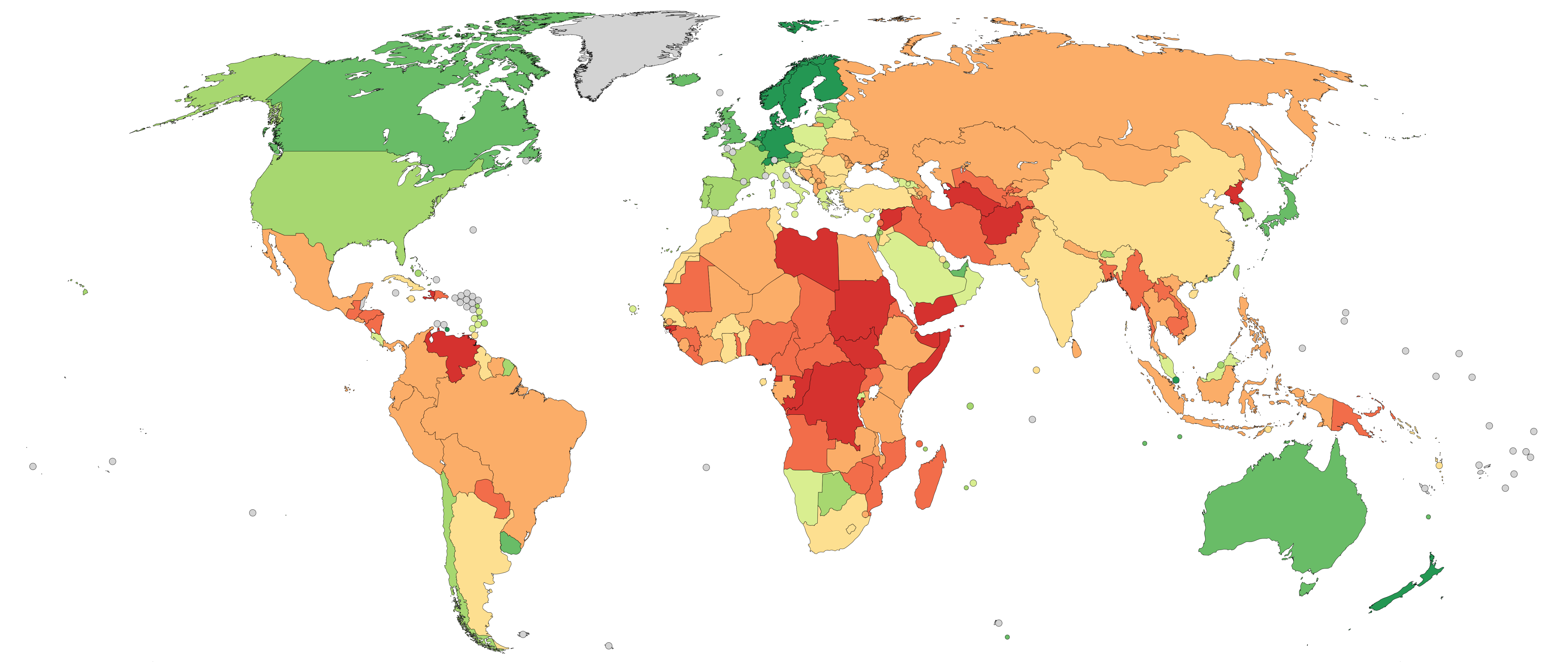
Corruption Perceptions Index for Pakistan compared to other countries, 2020

Corruption is an ongoing issue in the government, with claims of initiatives against it, particularly at the government and lower levels of police forces. In 2011, the country consistently ranked poorly on the Transparency International's Corruption Perceptions Index, with scores of 2.5, 2.3 in 2010, and 2.5 in 2009 out of 10. In 2011, Pakistan ranked 134th on the index, with 42 countries ranking worse. In 2012, Pakistan's ranking dropped further from 134 to 139, making Pakistan the 34th most corrupt country in the world, tied with Azerbaijan, Kenya, Nepal, and Nigeria.

According to the IMF’s 2025 Governance and Corruption Diagnostic Assessment, Pakistan’s economy loses an estimated 5–6.5 percent of its GDP to corruption due to entrenched "elite capture," in which influential groups shape public policy for their own benefit. The system has led to market distortions and wastage of public resources.

=== Military interference ===
The Pakistani military maintains significant influence over the country's economy, as illustrated by a July 2025 meeting between foreign exchange company representatives and a senior intelligence official, Major General Faisal Naseer of the Inter-Services Intelligence (ISI), to discuss the depreciation of the Pakistani rupee. While monetary policy and currency regulation traditionally fall under civilian institutions such as the State Bank of Pakistan, the involvement of a high-ranking military officer reflects the broader role the military plays in national economic matters.

=== Poverty and Income inequality ===
In 1965, Pakistan's chief economist Mahbub ul Haq asserted that 22 families dominated the country's economic and financial sectors. He contended that these families controlled roughly two-thirds of industrial assets, 80 percent of banking, and 79 percent of insurance assets. In 2015, Pakistan's pre-tax income distribution was highly concentrated at the top, with estimates indicating that the richest 1 percent received 30.2 percent of national income, the top 0.1 percent received 13.4 percent, and the top 0.01 percent received 5.1 percent.

The UNDP’s National Human Development Report (NHDR) 2020 stated that public spending in Pakistan had not benefited all income groups equally. The poorest category received only 14.2 percent of the overall share of expenditure, while the richest received 37.2 percent. According to NHDR 2021, the richest 20 percent held 49.6 percent of national income, compared with just 7 percent held by the poorest 20 percent.

=== Debt ===
According to the CIA World Factbook, in 2017, Pakistan ranked 57th in the world in terms of public external debt to various international monetary authorities (owing ~$107.527 billion in 2019), accounting for a total of 67.1% of GDP (in 2017). Government debt and liabilities data is sourced from the State Bank of Pakistan. Pakistan's external debt servicing includes the repayment of both the principal amount borrowed and the accrued interest.

=== Climate change ===
The poverty rate of Pakistan, when estimated at $2 per day purchasing power parity, exceeds 50% of the total population with stark provincial disparities. This high prevalence of poverty, coupled with the lack of and access to resources, places the country in the low human development category, ranked 146 out of 187 countries, well below the average human development index value compared to other South Asian countries.

The Intergovernmental Panel on Climate Change (IPCC) Fifth Assessment Report (AR5) for the Asia region noted that the sensitivity of agriculture-dependent economies (such as Pakistan) toward climate change arises from their distinct geography, demographic trends, socioeconomic factors, and lack of adaptive capacity that when taken together, determine the climate change vulnerability profile of the country. Pakistan is frequently plagued by heatwaves, droughts, river and flash floods, landslides, and storms, including cyclones. The impact of climate change has the potential to initiate extensive and potent negative feedback loops that affect both livelihoods and public health. Consequently, this contributes to Pakistan's ongoing struggle with poverty. Paired with the surging inflation and the ongoing political turbulence in the country, this situation has the potential to create a catastrophic scenario. These concurrent trends serve as possible factors that may drive climate-induced migration from rural regions to urban hubs as people in Pakistan search for employment and more stable living conditions.

== See also ==
- List of companies of Pakistan
- List of Pakistanis by net worth
- Trade unions in Pakistan
- Economic liberalisation in Pakistan
- Nationalisation in Pakistan
- Privatisation in Pakistan
- Economy of Punjab, Pakistan
- Economy of Sindh
- Economy of Khyber Pakhtunkhwa
- Economy of Balochistan, Pakistan
- Economy of Azad Kashmir
- Economy of Gilgit Baltistan
