= Bank of Azad Jammu and Kashmir =

Government owned bank

Bank of Azad Jammu & Kashmir (BAJK)
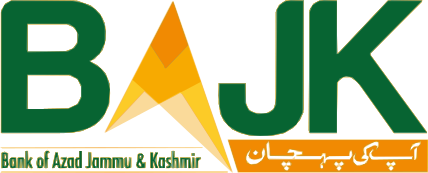
- Company type: State-owned
- Industry: Banking; Capital markets
- Founded: 2005; 21 years ago
- Headquarters: Muzaffarabad, Azad Kashmir
- Key people: Shahid Shahzad Mir (President & CEO)
- Products: Bank Loans, savings accounts, consumer banking
- Total assets: ▲ Rs. 58.12 billion (US$210 million) (Q3 FY22)
- Website: bankajk.com

Bank of Azad Jammu & Kashmir (BAJK) is a state-owned commercial bank operated by the Government of Azad Jammu and Kashmir, with its headquarters in Muzaffarabad. It was founded in 2005.

As of July 2025, BAJK had a network of 88 branches.

== History ==
BAJK entered into an agreement with a consortium of national and international companies for the procurement of core banking and digital channels software. It also signed a MoU with Silverlake.

== Assets ==
The total assets of the bank reached Rs. 58.12 billion (US$210 million) and deposits Rs. 47.18 billion (US$170 million) in the first 9 months of the 2025 calendar year as said by Ghulamullah Kiyani, spokesperson of BAJK.

== See also ==
- Economy of Azad Kashmir
