= List of districts in Khyber Pakhtunkhwa by gross domestic product =

Khyber Pakhtunkhwa, located in the northwestern part of Pakistan, is an economically diverse province with a mix of urban centers, agricultural hubs, and natural resources. Districts such as Peshawar, the provincial capital, and Mardan play significant roles in KP's overall economic landscape, while others, like Swat and Abbottabad, contribute through sectors such as tourism, agriculture, and trade.

== Districts by gross domestic product ==
The data has been taken from Khyber Pakhtunkhwa's Bureau of Statistics.

| Rank | | District | GDP (Rs. in Millions) | | GDP Per Capita | GDP Share (%) | | Change in Rank |
| 2005-06 | 2019-20 | | 2005-06 | 2019-20 | 2019-20 | 2005-06 | 2019-20 | |
|---|---|---|---|---|---|---|---|---|
| 1 | 1 | Peshawar | 106,853 | 228,583 | 53,543 | 16 | 19 | Same |
| 4 | 2 | Nowshera | 55,821 | 142,301 | 93,708 | 8 | 12 | Up |
| 2 | 3 | Mardan | 69,816 | 113,350 | 47,765 | 10 | 9 | Down |
| 7 | 4 | Haripur | 35,655 | 104,021 | 103,707 | 5 | 9 | Up |
| 11 | 5 | Abbottabad | 23,240 | 81,088 | 60,835 | 3 | 7 | Up |
| 5 | 6 | Swabi | 53,070 | 74,478 | 45,843 | 8 | 6 | Down |
| 8 | 7 | D. I. Khan | 33,709 | 72,156 | 44,345 | 5 | 6 | Up |
| 3 | 8 | Charsada | 57,788 | 56,273 | 34,817 | 9 | 5 | Down |
| 9 | 9 | Kohat | 29,184 | 52,264 | 52,586 | 4 | 4 | Same |
| 12 | 10 | Mansehra | 23,115 | 51,039 | 32,791 | 3 | 4 | Up |
| 6 | 11 | Bannu | 36,221 | 45,886 | 39,289 | 5 | 4 | Down |
| 10 | 12 | Swat | 28,001 | 40,085 | 17,355 | 4 | 3 | Down |
| 15 | 13 | Malakand | 12,973 | 33,430 | 46,411 | 2 | 3 | Up |
| 14 | 14 | Lakki Marwat | 16,627 | 28,166 | 32,146 | 2 | 2 | Same |
| 13 | 15 | Lower Dir | 16,976 | 23,418 | 16,308 | 3 | 2 | Down |
| 16 | 16 | Karak | 12,491 | 14,650 | 20,741 | 2 | 1 | Same |
| 21 | 17 | Tank | 7,328 | 8,617 | 21,988 | 1 | 1 | Up |
| 20 | 18 | Hangu | 7,418 | 8,301 | 16,000 | 1 | 1 | Up |
| 17 | 19 | Buner | 10,547 | 8,107 | 9,034 | 2 | 1 | Down |
| 19 | 20 | Upper Dir | 8,457 | 6,665 | 7,042 | 1 | 1 | Down |
| 24 | 21 | Shangla | 3,927 | 6,403 | 8,448 | 1 | 1 | Up |
| 23 | 22 | Batagram | 4,758 | 4,932 | 10,348 | 1 | 0 | Up |
| 22 | 23 | Chitral | 6,551 | 4,632 | 10,355 | 1 | 0 | Down |
| 18 | 24 | Kohistan | 8,947 | 1,544 | 3,032 | 1 | 0 | Down |
| 25 | 25 | Tor Ghar | 1,221 | 811 | 4,733 | 0 | 0 | Same |

== Read More ==
- List of Pakistani administrative units by gross state product
- Economy of Pakistan
- Khyber Pakhtunkhwa
