= Real estate in Pakistan =

Real estate in Pakistan is a growing sector of the economy of Pakistan.

== Real Estate Demand ==
Demand for residential properties in Pakistan grew in 2010, leading to increased interest among real estate developers and investors. Since prices have exceeded 10 million PKR, new housing developments are often aimed at the upper middle class. To assist the real-estate sector, the Government of Pakistan announced a reduction in interest rates on mortgage loans in 2012.

In 2017, the housing gap in Punjab, one of the largest provinces of Pakistan, was around 2.3 million units, this figure is expected to reach the figure of 11.3 million units by the end of 2047.

The prominent factors causing the shortages includes rural-to-urban migration, population growth, lower interest rates, and tax incentives, the poor quality of available properties, and the subsidy schemes, like Roshan Apna Ghar, Mera Ghar Mera Pakistan, etc., in urban areas of the country.

According to a report, the population in Pakistan has grown by a CAGR of 2.1% between FY16 and FY21. With the given trend, the figure would reach 231.58 million in FY23.

The overall real estate industry contributed significantly to Pakistan's GDP during the stated period with a growth rate of between 5.4 % and 5.9%.

== Real estate sector worth ==
Moreover, many more billions are spent on buying residential and commercial plots. Pakistan's real estate sector is worth around $1.8 trillion. According to the Pakistan Bureau of Statistics, construction output accounts for 2% of GDP, with housing representing less than half that total. With the rate of urbanization that Pakistan has been experiencing, there is a growing need for urban planning.

== Real estate regulatory authority ==
Prime Minister Imran Khan has recommended the formation of the Real Estate Regulatory Authority, while the Association of Builders and Developers is against its formation.

== Real estate education ==
NED University of Engineering & Technology offers Master of Science in Real Estate Management.

Panjwani Institute of Business Studies & Technology offers Professional Diploma in Real Estate Management

NIREM (National Institute of Real Estate Management) offers Real Estate Professionals Development Program.

== Real estate agents ==
According to FPCCI (The Federation of Pakistan Chambers of Commerce and Industry), real estate agents are playing an important role in the economic development of the country. "Construction sector has grown by 9% which indicates its strength but this robust sector needs help of the real-estate sector," it said in a 2017 statement.

== Real estate and Finance Bill 2023-24 ==
Poor economic situation in 2023 is one of the reasons behind low investment in real estate. Besides, some parts of the Finance Bill 2023-24 are angering realtors. The real estate market is not getting enough investments because people are getting a high interest on their bank deposits. The growth prospects of the sector are shattered by the imposition of an 18.5% tax on non-filers. Real estate leaders are calling for immediate reforms to put the industry on right track.

== Illegal housing societies in Rawalpindi ==
The Rawalpindi Development Authority (RDA) has declared more than 300 housing societies illegal. The management of the RDA has announced that 69 housing societies are authoirized to operate in Rawalpindi.

== Illegal housing societies in Islamabad ==
Over 111 housing societies in Islamabad have been declared illegal by the Capital Development Authority (CDA) as per the statistics available with the National Assembly Standing Committee on Climate Change and Environmental Coordination. The list of illegal housing societies in Islamabad is also available online.

== Overseas Pakistani investment ==
Overseas Pakistanis are among the largest investors in Pakistan's real estate market. Residential housing schemes, apartments, and commercial developments in major cities such as Islamabad, Lahore, Karachi, and Rawalpindi attract significant investment from expatriate Pakistanis due to remittance inflows and long-term capital appreciation potential.
