= Furniture industry in Pakistan =

Pakistani furniture

According to the World Trade Organization's statistics, Pakistan's exports of wooden furniture amounted to $51 million in 2011. The furniture industry in Pakistan is expanding, with many new companies joining the industry.

Pakistani furniture manufacturers have expertise in handmade furniture, and the type of wood used namely 'sheesham' (rosewood) adds to this furniture's demand. The leading manufacturing areas of wooden furniture in Pakistan are Chiniot, Gujrat, Peshawar, Lahore and Karachi.

== Impact of increased consumer spending ==
Consumer spending increased by an average of 26% - per the Bloomberg's report, which was published on November 21, 2013. It's not only that the Fast-moving consumer goods (FMCGs) companies get benefits from increased consumer spending; the furniture manufacturers also benefit from it.

== Pakistan's furniture exports ==
As per the World Trade Organization's statistics, the wooden furniture exports of Pakistan reportedly amounted to almost $51 million in the calendar year (CY) 2011. Whereas, in 2009-2010 the furniture exports of Pakistan ranged between $25 million to $30 million (excluding undocumented exports of an approximate amount of $10 million). However, according to the All Pakistan Furniture Exporters Association (APFEA) founder, Turhan Baig Muhammad, these exports represent a very small portion of the total furniture business of the country. According to him, the local furniture market is almost 50 times stronger than that of the exports. Keeping this in view, the approximate total furniture sale of the country is more than $2.5 billion.

== Fears for the furniture industry of Pakistan ==
The total world trade of furniture was estimated to be $23.2 billion in 2021; wood furniture accounts for 77 percent, metal furniture 17 percent, and plastic furniture 6 percent. In 2010, the share of Pakistan in the international furniture market was trivial. Even though the country takes pride in having a history of craftsmanship, it does not share a significant position in the international wood furniture market.

The domestic furniture industry is suffering because furniture exports to Pakistan from some other countries have increased, alongside the cost of furniture-making, increasing problems for the local furniture manufacturers. The prices of raw materials such as timber, color paints, chipboard, polish materials, and foams have increased manifold. Due to unchecked deforestation, the country's timber production is also suffering.

The wood furniture industry of Pakistan is categorized as being small due to higher costs and low output, owing to the old obsolete machinery which is still used in this industry.

Traditional wood furniture in Pakistan is heavy and bulky. In order for the furniture to be exported to the world market, the industry needs to shift to light-weight and moveable furniture, which is the highly in demand for offices, buildings, shopping malls, and plazas.

Pakistan furniture council has urged the government to bar furniture imports. The most frequently imported furniture goods are office furniture, bar stools, and visitor chairs, for which there is a huge demand in Pakistan.

== Furniture City in Faisalabad ==
In 2014 the Faisalabad Industrial Estate Development and Management Company (FIEDMC) had plans to set up a furniture city in the industrial area of Faisalabad, Pakistan. There were also talks of wood seasoning plants to be established in order to manufacture international standard furniture.

In this regard, the FIEDMC has joined hands with the European-based company IKEA, the world's largest furniture retailer that designs and sells ready-to-assemble furniture, for the development of the furniture city in Faisalabad. The company also projected that an estimated 200,000 job opportunities will be created through this initiative.

== Improvements in furniture industry ==
"Pakistan needs to bring improvements to its furniture industry to increase the total revenue generated from this industry", said the Pakistani Federal Minister for Commerce, Khurram Dastgir.

The country does not lack resources and skills when it comes to manufacturing quality furniture. However, there is a need to utilize these resources properly in order to expand the furniture industry of Pakistan. Another target to consider is to increase international trade and foreign exchange income from it, as the market beyond Pakistani borders is substantially larger than the local market.
