= Economy of Balochistan, Pakistan =

The economy of Balochistan, one of the four provinces of Pakistan, is largely based upon the extraction and production of natural gas, coal, and minerals. Agriculture and livestock also dominate the Baloch economy. Horticultural development is a fairly recent, yet growing phenomenon. Other important economic sectors include fisheries, mining, manufacturing industries, trade and other services being rendered by public and private sector organizations in the province.

Outside Quetta, the infrastructure of the province is gradually developing but still lags far behind other parts of the country. Tourism remains limited but has increased due to the exotic appeal of the province. Limited farming in the east as well as fishing along the southern Arabian Sea coastline are other forms of income and sustenance for the local populations. Due to the tribal lifestyle of many Pashtun, Baloch and Brahui people, animal husbandry is important, as are trading bazaars found throughout the province. Pakistan heavily depends on imported oil, and when global crude oil prices rise, it exerts an adverse influence on the regional economy.

Though the province remains largely underdeveloped, there are currently several major development projects in progress in Balochistan, including the construction of a new deep sea port at the strategically important town of Gwadar. The port is projected to be the hub of an energy and trade corridor to and from China and the Central Asian republics.

Further west is the Mirani Dam multipurpose project, on the Dasht River, 50 kilometres (31 mi) west of Turbat in the Makran Division. It will provide dependable irrigation supplies for the development of agriculture and add more than 35,000 km^{2} of arable land. There is also Chinese investments in the nearby Saindak gold and copper mining project.

One of the world's largest copper deposits (and its matrix-associated residual gold) have been found at Reko Diq in the Chagai District of Balochistan. Reko Diq is a giant mining project in Chaghi. The main license (EL5) is held jointly by the Government of Balochistan (25%), Antofagasta Minerals (37.5%) and Barrick Gold (37.5%). The deposits at Reko Diq are hoped to be even bigger than those of Sarcheshmeh in Iran and Escondida in Chile (presently, the second and the third largest proven deposits of copper in the world).

BHP Billiton, the world's largest copper mining company, began the project in cooperation with the Australian firm Tethyan, entering into a joint venture with the Balochistan government. The potential annual copper production has been estimated to be 900,000 to 2.2 million tons. The deposits seem to be largely of porphyry rock nature.

In the south east Lasbela District oil refinery has been constructed in 2014, oil refinery capable of processing 120,000 barrels of oil. Furthermore, a power station is located adjacent to refinery, that produces about 1350 MW of power. Several Cement plant is also located there. Marble factory is also located. Also one of the world largest ship breaking yard is located in Lesbella coast

Also in 2015 a motorway began construction South West in Gwadar District to Quetta then to Ratodero. This motorway will connect many towns to major highways and cities. Also in 2015 in the northern city of Quetta a freight service is being commenced to Iranian city of Zahedan. This service will give better opportunities to businesses, community and locals, with local traders being given special commission.

In late 2015, a $1 billion construction order had taken place to further develop and construct a port in the south west, this also includes vocational institute related with the port and in time a business area. Also in early 2016 ferry service connecting Iran with Gwadar set to begin. Overall spending in infrastructure construction, energy expansion, and routes development would unshackle bottle necks to drive connectivity, trade and growth.

Balochistan remains at the bottom of the human development index. As per available data, 85 per cent of the population has no access to safe drinking water, around 75 per cent is deprived of access to electricity, 70 per cent do not have access to education and 63 per cent are living below the poverty line.

Pakistan failed to provide basic facilities to the people of Balochistan province, despite being rich in natural resources, the people of this region are living in very poor conditions. Balochistan is still politically and economically the most excluded of all the provinces of Pakistan.

The situation in Pakistan's Balochistan province is dire. Basic necessities, such as access to education for children, have not been adequately provided by the Pakistani government. Consequently, this lack of essential services has hindered the economic development of Balochistan.

== See also ==
- Tourism in Balochistan, Pakistan
- Fisheries Research and Training Institute, Lahore Pakistan
