= Economy of Azad Kashmir =

Economy of Azad Kashmir (Pakistan)

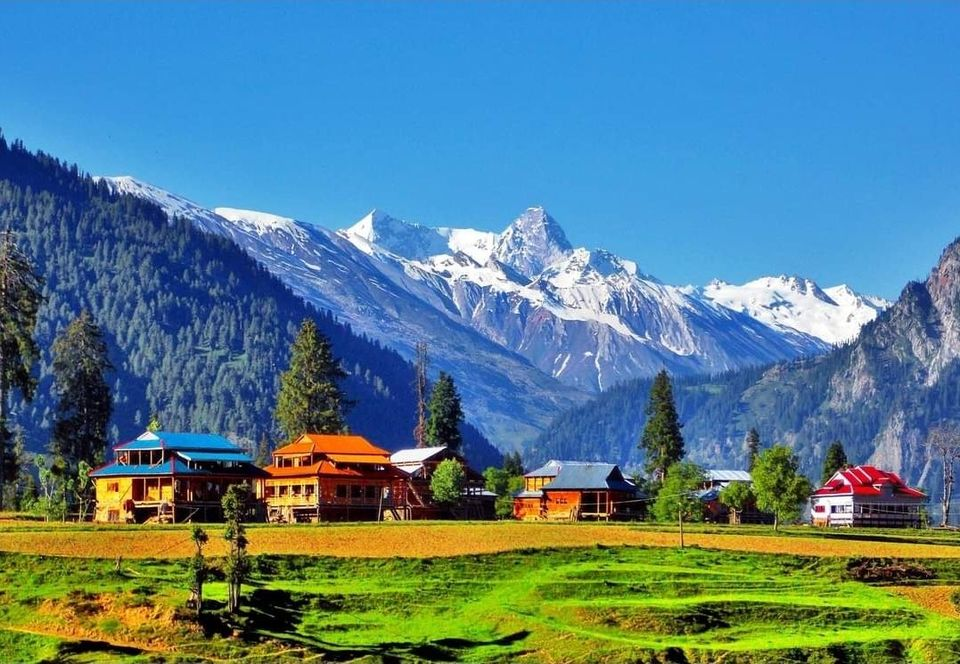
Neeulm Valley

The economy of Kashmir is largely a developing one. The per capita income and provincial GDP estimates of Azad Kashmir are comparatively underrated when compared with development in other regions of the country, although Azad Kashmir notably has a literacy rate that is substantially above the national average. Azad Kashmir's economy is heavily dependent on agriculture, but also relies on remittances sent each year by the members of the large Kashmiri diaspora. The Kashmiri diaspora in the United Kingdom have contributed greatly to the development of Azad Kashmir through their in-flow of remittances. In the southern districts, many men have been recruited into the Pakistani Armed Forces. Other locals travel to countries in Europe or the Middle East where they work in labour-oriented jobs. The local tourism industry has potential although it is underdeveloped.

== History ==
In 2005, Azad Kashmir's economy faces challenges including the devastating 2005 Kashmir earthquake and floods, the region is still recovering from the economic effect of this several years later.

In 2013, GDP of Azad Kashmir was US$3.2 Billion.

In 2022, the GDP of Azad Kashmir was US$6.6 billion with per capita income of US$1,512.

== Current status ==
As of 2025/2026 data, the status is as follows:

- FY2024-25 Budget allocation
  - Azad Kashmir: Pakistan allocated US$790 million.
  - Note: The most recent official data from the Azad Jammu and Kashmir Finance Department reports the nominal Gross Domestic Product (GDP) for the fiscal year 2022–2023 was (approx. US$ 6.6 billion). A precise GDP figure for the year 2026 is not yet available, as official economic data is published with a lag of several years. The region's economy grew at an average annual rate of 8.4 percent based on growth rate from 2013-2022 in the decade leading up to 2022. Based on this historical trend, the nominal GDP for 2026 is projected to be PKR 2.69T (approx. US$ 9.7 billion).
- GDP growth rate
  - Azad Kashmir: nearly 8.4 percent
- Inflation
  - Azad Kashmir: nearly 38%.
- Hospitals
  - Azad Kashmir: 23.
- Airports
  - Azad Kashmir: 2.

== See also ==
- Economy of Pakistan
- List of countries by GDP (PPP)
- List of countries by GDP (nominal)
