= Economy of Khyber Pakhtunkhwa =

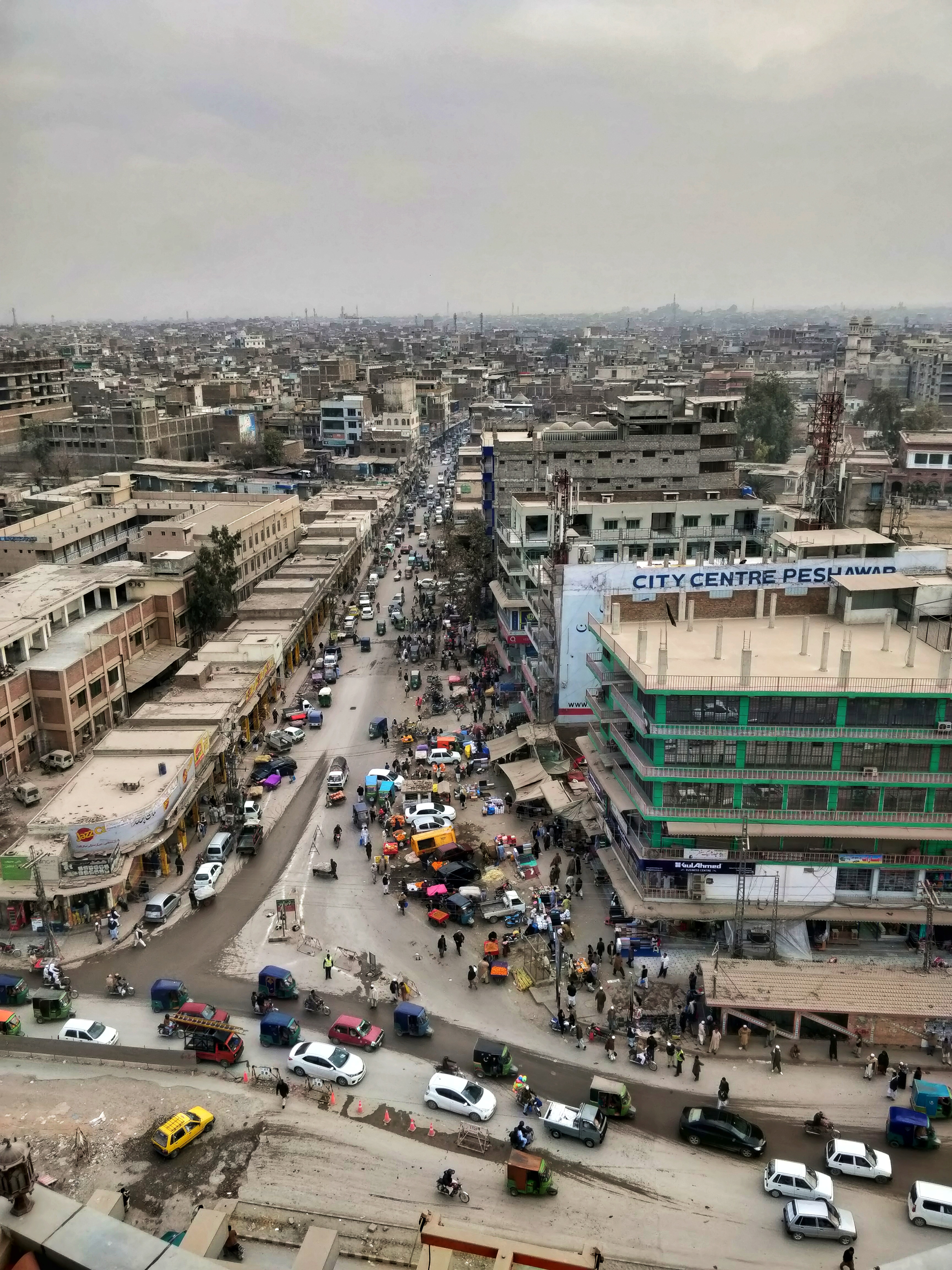
City center Peshawar

The economy of Khyber Pakhtunkhwa, a province of Pakistan, is the 3rd largest in the country. Khyber Pakhtunkhwa's share of Pakistan's total GDP has historically comprised 10.5%, although the province accounts for 11.9% of Pakistan's total population, rendering it the second-poorest province after neighboring Balochistan. The part of the economy that Khyber Pakhtunkhwa dominates is forestry, where its share has historically ranged from a low of 34.9% to a high of 81%, giving an average of 61.56%. Currently, Khyber Pakhtunkhwa accounts for 20% of Pakistan's mining output and since 1972, it has seen its economy grow in size by 3.6 times.

Agriculture remains the important and the main cash crops include wheat, maize, Tobacco (in Swabi), rice, sugar beets, as well as various fruits are grown in the province.

Some manufacturing and high tech investments in Peshawar has helped improve job prospects for many locals, while trade in the province involves nearly every product. The bazaars in the province are renowned throughout Pakistan. Unemployment has been reduced due to establishment of industrial zones.

Numerous workshops throughout the province support the manufacture of small arms and weapons of various types. The province accounts for 78% of the marble production in Pakistan.
