= Kalat Division =

Administrative division of Balochistan, Pakistan

Khuzdar Division
- Division
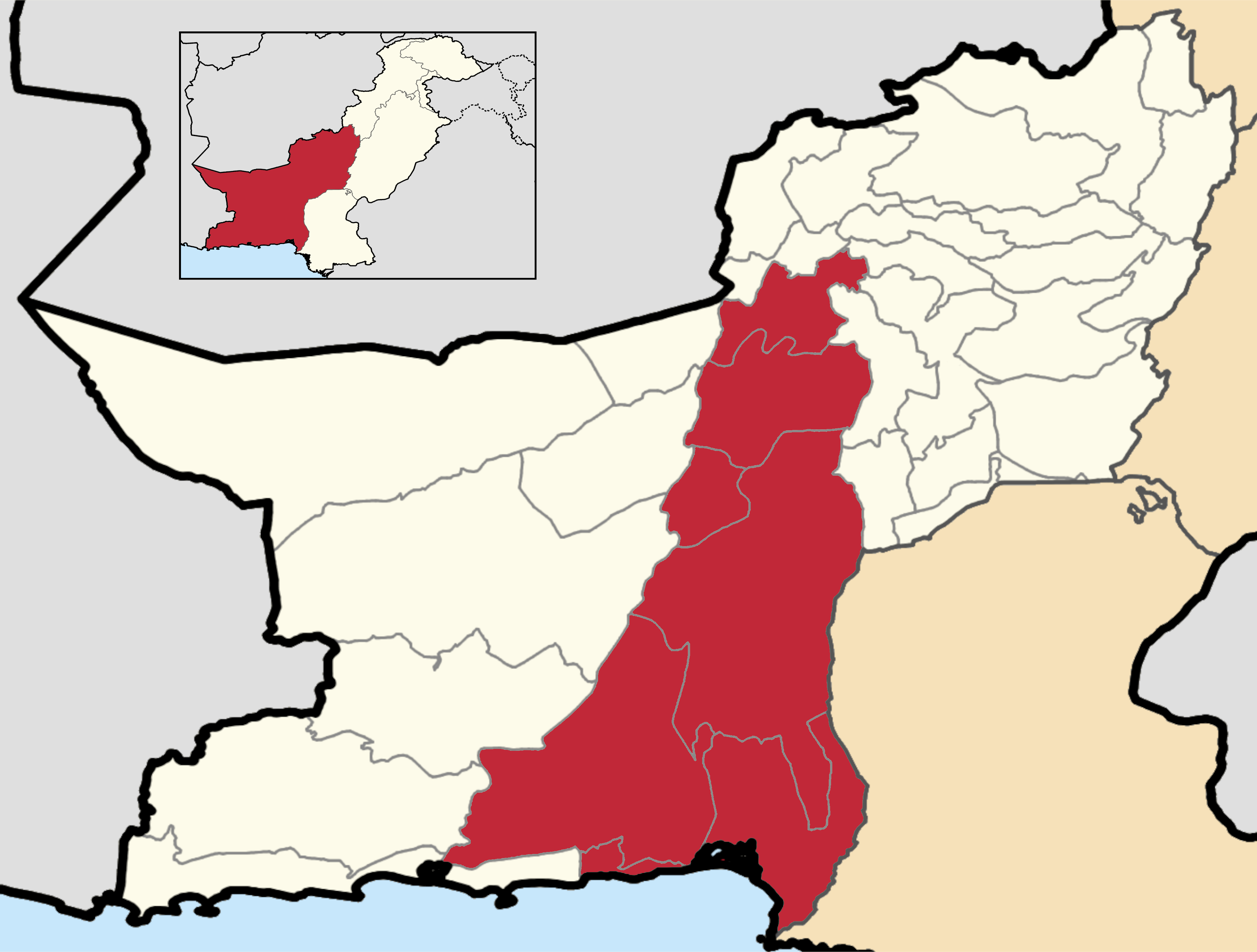
- Map of Kalat Division within Balochistan
- Coordinates: 27°30′N 66°00′E
- Country: Pakistan
- Province: Balochistan
- Capital: Khuzdar
- Established: 14 October 1955; 70 years ago
- Districts: 07: Awaran District Hub District Kalat District Khuzdar District Lasbela District Mastung District Surab District

Government
  - Type: Divisional Administration
  - Commissioner: Dawood Khan Khilji
  - Constituency: NA-256 Khuzdar; NA-257 Hub-cum-Lasbela-cum-Awaran; NA-261 Surab-cum-Kalat-cum-Mastung

Area
  - Division: 91,767 km^{2} (35,431 sq mi)
- Elevation: 2,007 m (6,585 ft)

Population (2023)
  - Division: 2,719,964
  - Density: 29.65/km^{2} (76.8/sq mi)
  - Urban: 863,081 (31.72%)
  - Rural: 1,857,937 (68.28%)
- Demonym: Khuzdari

Language Speakers (2023)
  - Native Speakers: Largest: Brahvis (58.5%); Others: Balochs (35.87%)

Literacy (2023)
  - Literacy rate: Total: (38.72%); Male: (47.04%); Female: (29.67%)
- Time zone: UTC+05:00 (PKT)
  - Summer (DST): DST is not observed
- ZIP Code: 89100
- NWD (area) code: 844
- ISO 3166 code: PK-BA

Kalat Division is an administrative division of Balochistan province of Pakistan. Its capital city is Khuzdar, which was founded on 14 October 1955. The CNIC Code of Kalat Division is 51. According to 2023 Pakistani census, the current population of the Division is 2,719,964 (2.7 million).

== History ==
Khuzdar Division was established after the dissolution of the Balochistan state union on 14 October 1955. When the Baluchistan States Union became Khuzdar Division, Khuzdar was established as the divisional headquarters and it was named Kalat Division. At the time of its establishment, the division had four districts (04) Kalat, Makran, Lasbela, and Kharan district.

In 1960, Lasbela district transferred to form Karachi-Bela division. On 1 July 1971, Makran district separates from Khuzdar Division to form a separate division. In 1972, Lasbela district again become a part of Khuzdar division. In 1974, a new district Khuzdar created from Kalat district and added in Khuzdar Division.

In 1991, Mastung district spelt from Kalat district territory included in Khuzdar Division. In 1992, Awaran district split from khuzdar district and added in Khuzdar Division.

In 2007, Washuk district created from Kharan district territory and added in Khuzdar Division.

On 17 May 2015, Kharan and Washuk district shifted from Khuzdar Division to newly established Rakhshan Division. In 2017, Surab district created from Kalat district territory included in Khuzdar Division.

In 2022, Hub district split from Lasbela district and added in Khuzdar division.

On 24 May, 2026, The Cabinet of the Provincial Government has approved the restructuring of Kalat Division. As part of the new administrative changes, Lasbela Division has been created through the bifurcation of the former Kalat Division. Awaran, Lasbela, and Hub districts have been included in the newly formed division.

Additionally, Mastung District has been transferred from Khuzdar Division to Quetta Division. In addition, Wadh District has been created from Khuzdar District as part of the administrative bifurcation.

The remaining part of the former Kalat Division has been renamed as Khuzdar Division. Since the divisional headquarters had already been shifted from Kalat to Khuzdar earlier, the administrative setup was effectively aligned with Khuzdar as the central headquarters.

== Demographics ==
=== Population ===
Historical population
Year	Pop.	±% p.a.
1951	...	—
1961	...	—
1972	...	—
1981	1,044,174	—
1998	1,457,722	+1.98%
2017	2,509,230	+2.90%
2023	2,721,018	+1.36%

According to 2023 census, Kalat Division had a population of 2,721,018 roughly equal to the population of the US state of Kansas. It had an area of 91,767 km² roughly equal to the area of Hungary or the US state of Virginia.

=== Language ===
Languages of Khuzdar Division (2023)
1. Brahui (58.5%)
2. Balochi (35.9%)
3. Sindhi (incl. Lasi) (3.04%)
4. Pashto (1.26%)
5. Others (1.50%)

The population of the division is predominantly Brahui and Balochi, with an estimated 58.50% identifying as Brahui (1,591,281) and around 35.87% (975,666) as Baloch, while the include Pashtuns and other minority groups.

== Districts ==
#	District	Headquarter	Area (km²)	Pop. (2023)	Density (ppl/km²) (2023)	Lit. rate (2023)
1	Surab	Surab	762	279,038	366.5	37.44%
2	Khuzdar	Khuzdar	35,380	997,214	28.2	38.59%
3	Wadh District	Wadh	35,380	997,214	28.2	38.59%
4	Kalat	Kalat	7,654	271,560	35.5	39.70%

== Tehsils ==
Tehsil	Area (km²)	Population (2023)	Density (ppl/km²) (2023)	Literacy rate (2023)	Districts	
Awaran Tehsil	13,075	45,774	3.50	42.90%	Awaran	
Gishkaur Tehsil	4,578	31,462	6.87	36.34%	Awaran	
Jhal Jhao Tehsil	6,381	28,132	4.41	26.62%	Awaran	
Korak Jhao Tehsil	3,058	27,652	9.04	26.71%	Awaran	
Mashkay Tehsil	2,418	45,938	19.00	41.21%	Awaran	
Gadani Tehsil	419	29,215	69.73	48.57%	Hub	
Sonmiani Tehsil	2,616	67,991	25.99	35.80%	Hub	
Hub Tehsil	868	233,443	268.94	44.35%	Hub	
Sakran Tehsil	...	...	...	...	Hub	
Dureji Tehsil	2,813	52,236	18.57	15.58%	Hub	
Kalat Tehsil	3,788	167,405	44.19	44.19%	Kalat	
Mangocher Tehsil	1,148	80,138	69.81	35.22%	Kalat	
Gazg Tehsil	1,390	8,286	5.96	18.75%	Kalat	
Johan Tehsil	1,328	15,731	11.85	27.49%	Kalat	
Khuzdar Tehsil	6,112	359,358	58.80	43.85%	Khuzdar	
Nal Tehsil	1,791	103,631	57.86	47.26%	Khuzdar	
Wadh Tehsil	2,118	116,229	54.88	31.83%	Khuzdar	
Zehri Tehsil	4,021	150,928	37.53	49.38%	Khuzdar	
Baghbana Tehsil	...	...	...	...	Khuzdar	
Aranji Tehsil	7,456	50,533	6.78	12.11%	Khuzdar	
Gresha Tehsil	2,622	69,665	26.57	22.10%	Khuzdar	
Karakh Tehsil	5,352	145806	26.62	32.14%	Khuzdar	
Moola Tehsil	3,283	32,689	9.96	52.68%	Khuzdar	
Ornach Tehsil	3,368	41,811	12.41	21.58%	Khuzdar	
Saroona Tehsil	3,257	36,380	11.17	24.22%	Khuzdar	
Uthal Tehsil	1,756	88,933	50.65	33.95%	Lasbela	
Lakhra Tehsil	1,954	46,744	23.92	15.31%	Lasbela	
Bela Tehsil	1,527	129,264	84.65	40.98%	Lasbela	
Kanraj Tehsil	1,190	15,996	13.44	20.32%	Lasbela	
Liari Tehsil	2,010	17,155	8.53	16.09%	Lasbela	
Dasht Tehsil	1,047	67,935	64.89	36.79%	Lasbela	Mastung
Mastung Tehsil	692	162,319	234.57	53.70%		Mastung
Khad Koocha Tehsil	640	46,316	72.37	33.22%		Mastung
Kirdgap Tehsil	929	36,701	39.51	42.71%		Mastung
Dasht e Goran	215	27,503	127.92	38.85%	Surab	
Gidder	205	89,631	437.22	36.31%	Surab	
Shaheed meharabad zehri	109	66,435	609.50	42.85%	Surab	
Surab Tehsil	233	95,469	409.74	34.34%	Surab	

== Constituencies ==
#	Provincial Assembly Constituency	National Assembly Constituency	District
1	PB-18 Khuzdar-I	NA-256 Khuzdar	Khuzdar
2	PB-19 Khuzdar-II	NA-256 Khuzdar	Khuzdar
3	PB-20 Khuzdar-III	NA-256 Khuzdar	Khuzdar
4	PB-21 Hub	NA-257 Hub-cum-Lasbela-cum-Awaran	Hub
5	PB-22 Lasbela	NA-257 Hub-cum-Lasbela-cum-Awaran	Lasbela
6	PB-23 Awaran	NA-257 Hub-cum-Lasbela-cum-Awaran	Awaran
7	PB-35 Surab	NA-261 Surab-cum-Kalat-cum-Mastung	Surab
8	PB-36 Kalat	NA-261 Surab-cum-Kalat-cum-Mastung	Kalat
9	PB-37 Mastung	NA-261 Surab-cum-Kalat-cum-Mastung	Mastung

== See also ==
- Districts of Pakistan
  - Districts of Balochistan
- Tehsils of Pakistan
  - Tehsils of Balochistan
- Divisions of Pakistan
  - Divisions of Balochistan
  - Divisions of Khyber Pakhtunkhwa
  - Divisions of Punjab
  - Divisions of Sindh
  - Divisions of Azad Kashmir
  - Divisions of Gilgit-Baltistan
