= Khuzdar (disambiguation) =

Khuzdar is the district capital and 3rd largest city of Balochistan, Pakistan.

Khuzdar may also refer to:

== Places ==
- Khuzdar Tehsil, an administrative subdivision of the district
- Khuzdar District, a district in the central-eastern Balochistan that contains the city of Khuzdar
- Khuzdar Division, an administrative division in Balochistan
- Khuzdar Airport, an airport in Pakistan

== In government and politics ==
- NA-256 Khuzdar, a constituency of the National Assembly of Pakistan
- PB-18 Khuzdar-I, a constituency of the Provincial Assembly of Balochistan
- PB-19 Khuzdar-II, a constituency of the Provincial Assembly of Balochistan
- PB-20 Khuzdar-III, a constituency of the Provincial Assembly of Balochistan

== Other uses ==
- Khuzdarcroco
