= List of cities in Balochistan, Pakistan by population =

Cities in Balochistan, Pakistan

Map of selected cities in Balochistan, Pakistan. Hover over a dot to see the city name and rank in parentheses.

This is a list showing the most populous cities in the province of Balochistan, Pakistan as of the 2023 Census of Pakistan. In the following table, you can find each of the 40 cities and towns in the province with populations higher than 30,000 as of March 1, 2023. City populations found in this list only refer to populations found within the city's defined limits and any adjacent cantonments. The census totals below come from the Pakistan Bureau of Statistics.

== List ==
No.	City	District	Census		Image	Location
No.	City	District	2023 Census	2017 Census	Image	Location
1	Quetta	Quetta	1,565,546 ▲	1,001,205	Quetta	30.1798°N 66.9750°E
2	Turbat	Kech	268,625 ▲	213,557	Turbat	26.0042°N 63.0606°E
3	Khuzdar	Khuzdar	218,112 ▲	182,927	Khuzdar	27.8000°N 66.6167°E
4	Hub	Hub District	195,661 ▲	175,376	Hub, Balochistan	25.0676°N 66.9170°E
5	Panjgur (incl. Chitkan, Tasp, Washbood)	Panjgur District	157,693 ▲	80,411		26.9683°N 64.1014°E
6	Chaman	Chaman District	130,139 ▲	123,191	Chaman	30.9222°N 66.4447°E
7	Pishin	Pishin District	107,646 ▲	35,577		30.9181°N 66.9947°E
8	Dera Murad Jamali	Nasirabad District	106,952 ▲	96,591		28.5444°N 68.2206°E
9	Dera Allah Yar	Jaffarabad District	98,761 ▲	80,908		28.3769°N 68.3472°E
10	Kharan	Kharan District	80,806 ▲	51,388		28.5833°N 65.4167°E

== List of cities with population from 50,000 to 80,000 ==
Mini Cities by population in Balochistan, Pakistan
No.	City	District	Census		Image
No.	City	District	2023 Census	2017 Census	Image
11	Sui	Dera Bugti District	79,567 ▲	72,740	
12	Zehri	Khuzdar District	70,910 ▲	37,854	
13	Gwadar	Gwadar District	70,852	90,762	Gwadar
14	Sibi	Sibi District	69,300 ▲	64,427	
15	Buleda	Kech District	68,752 ▲	39,813	
16	Usta Mohammad	Usta Muhammad District	64,632 ▼	77,097	
17	Loralai	Loralai District	56,613▲	47,098	Loralai

== List of towns with a population below 50,000 ==
Towns by population in Balochistan, Pakistan
Town	District	Census	
Town	District	2023 Census	2017 Census
Tump	Tump District	49,269 ▲	48,766
Nushki	Nushki District	48,572 ▲	46,386
Nal	Khuzdar District	48,481 ▲	33,299
Khanozai	Pishin District	46,682 ▲	40,238
Saranan	Pishin District	46,512 ▲	37,927
Sanjawi	Ziarat District	45,539	...
Machh	Kachhi District	44,542 ▲	19,152
Kalat	Kalat District	44,440 ▲	36,864
Zhob	Zhob District	44,251 ▲	39,914
Pasni	Gwadar District	43,494 ▲	34,524
Huramzai	Pishin District	42,945 ▲	29,400
Washuk	Washuk District	41,107 ▲	21,872
Mastung	Mastung District	40,374 ▲	34,997
Uthal	Lasbela District	37,071 ▲	29,414
Surab	Surab District	36,468 ▲	35,594
Qilla Abdullah	Killa Abdullah District	35,384 ▲	26,151
Winder	Hub District	35,245 ▲	29,598
Qilla Saifullah	Killa Saifullah District	35,043 ▲	34,865
Western Chagai	30,625	22,283	
Bela	Lasbela District	29,380 ▲	24,603
Muslim Bagh	Killa Saifullah District	29,132 ▲	28,066
Dera Bugti	Dera Bugti District	28,880	27,625
Awaran	Awaran District	28,780	21,761
Wadh	Khuzdar District	26,875	22,209
Jiwani	Gwadar District	25,332	18,268
Gandava	Jhalmagsi District	24,130	7,815
Dalbandin	Chagai District	20,054	16,265
Shahrig	Harnai District	19,156	11,259
Kohlu	Kohlu District	18,978	17,443
Bhag	Kacchi District	18,634	16,600
Mashkai	Awaran District	18,056	12,476
Gaddani	Hub District	17,540	7,679
Dhadar	Kacchi District	17,276	15,240
Ormara	Gwadar District	16,573	15,631
Musakhel	Musakhel District	15,805	14,135
Dureji	Hub District	15,688	12,855
Sohbatpur	Sohbatpur District	14,728	12,867
Barkhan	Barkhan District	14,425	12,201
Harnai	Harnai District	14,277	13,303
Duki	Duki District	9,783	10,042
Ziarat	Ziarat District	3,863	3,392

== See also ==
- List of cities in Pakistan by population
  - List of cities in Azad Jammu & Kashmir by population
  - List of cities in Gilgit-Baltistan by population
  - List of cities in Khyber Pakhtunkhwa by population
  - List of cities in Sindh by population
  - List of cities and towns in Punjab, Pakistan by population
- Tehsils of Pakistan
  - Tehsils of Punjab, Pakistan
  - Tehsils of Khyber Pakhtunkhwa, Pakistan
  - Tehsils of Balochistan, Pakistan
  - Tehsils of Sindh, Pakistan
  - Tehsils of Azad Kashmir
  - Tehsils of Gilgit-Baltistan
- Districts of Pakistan
  - Districts of Khyber Pakhtunkhwa, Pakistan
  - Districts of Punjab, Pakistan
  - Districts of Balochistan, Pakistan
  - Districts of Sindh, Pakistan
  - Districts of Azad Kashmir
  - Districts of Gilgit-Baltistan

== Notes ==
A. This city did not exist as a municipality and was not classified as an urban area at the time of the 1998 Pakistan Census.
