= Chatoka Bhit =

Historical village in Pakistan

Chatoka Bhit Urdu (چٹوکہ بھٹ) is most ancient historical village located at a distance of 10 kilometers from Wadh town towards east in Pallimas Valley, Wadh Tehsil, Khuzdar District, Balochistan. Pakistan. The ancient inscriptions and Tharia Cave Paintings have been explored on rock shelters close to this oldest hamlet.
