= PB-18 Khuzdar-I =

Constituency of the Provincial Assembly of Balochistan, Pakistan

- Constituency for the Provincial Assembly of Balochistan
- Region: Zehri Tehsil, Moola Tehsil, Karakh Tehsil and Khuzdar Tehsil (partly) of Khuzdar District

Current constituency
- Party: Pakistan Muslim League (N)
- Member: Sanaullah Zehri
- Created from: PB-33 (Khuzdar-I)

PB-18 Khuzdar-I (پی بی-18 خضدار-1) is a constituency of the Provincial Assembly of Balochistan.

== General elections 2024 ==
Provincial election 2024: PB-18 Khuzdar-I
Party	Candidate	Votes	%	±%
PPP	Sanaullah Khan Zehri	20,263	52.15	
JUI (F)	Ghulam Sarwar	14,009	36.05	
Independent	Nawabzada Mir Israrullah	2,427	6.25	
Others	Others (eleven candidates)	2,158	5.55	
Turnout		41,419	50.95	
Total valid votes		38,857	93.81	
Rejected ballots		2,562	6.19	
Majority		6,254	16.10	
Registered electors		81,300		

== General elections 2008 ==
Contesting candidates	Party affiliation	Votes polled

== See also ==
- PB-17 Usta Muhammad
- PB-19 Khuzdar-II
