= Noora Mengal =

Baluch freedom fighter

Noora Mengal Urdu (نورا مينگل) was a Baluch freedom fighter of Jhalawan (southern) Balochistan, Pakistan who continuously fought against British dominance for nine years. His full name was Noor Muhammad Pahlwanzai Mengal. He was the head of Pahlwanzai subcaste of the Mengal tribe of Pallimas Valley Wadh District Khuzdar Balochistan.

== Arrest ==
Chief Sardar of Mengal tribe Shaker Khan and his son Mir Nooruddin Mengal were arrested and imprisoned in Quetta whose offspring Mir Nooruddin Mengal II also remained political figure of Balochistan. After the arrest of his chief sardars, Noora Mengal together with his companions became against the British government and started a guerrilla war from 1910. His fight made him legendary in the region of Jhalawan and Lasbela Balochistan. While going to Afghanistan, Noora Mengal was captured by a chief Nawab Mir Habibullah Nosherwani in 1919. According to some other sources he was arrested in 1917.

== Death ==
Noora Mengal was sentenced to life imprisonment. He died on 30 August 1921 in a British jail in Hyderabad, Sindh.
