= PB-20 Khuzdar-III =

Constituency of the Provincial Assembly of Balochistan, Pakistan

- Constituency for the Provincial Assembly of Balochistan
- Region: Wadh Tehsil, Aranji, Ornach Tehsil, Saroona and Nal Tehsil of Khuzdar District

Current constituency
- Party: Balochistan National Party (Mengal)
- Member: Mir Akbar Mengal
- Created from: PB-35 Khuzdar-III

PB-20 Khuzdar-III (پی بی-20 خضدار-3) is a constituency of the Provincial Assembly of Balochistan.

== By-election 2024 ==
2024 Pakistani by-elections: PB-20 Khuzdar-III
Party	Candidate	Votes	%	±%
BNP (M)	Mir Jahanzaib Mengal	28,175	56.07	
Independent	Mir Shafiq Ur Rehman Mengal	20,344	40.49	
Others	Others (six candidates)	1,723	3.43	
Turnout		52,978	56.09	
Total valid votes		50,242	94.84	
Rejected ballots		2,736	5.16	
Majority		7,831	15.58	
Registered electors		94,451		

== General elections 2024 ==
General election 2024: PB-20 Khuzdar-III
Party	Candidate	Votes	%	±%
BNP (M)	Akhtar Mengal	28,097	62.25	
Independent	Mir Shafiq Ur Rehman Mengal	9,243	20.48	
NP	Sher Dil Khan Tumrani	2,398	5.31	
TLP	Saeed Ahmed	1,324	2.93	
Others	Others (six candidates)	2,071	4.59	
Turnout		47,845	51.21	
Total valid votes		45,133	94.33	
Rejected ballots		2,712	4.67	
Majority		18,854	41.77	
Registered electors		93,425		

== General elections 2013 ==
Contesting candidates	Party affiliation	Votes polled

== General elections 2008 ==
Contesting candidates	Party affiliation	Votes polled

== See also ==
- PB-19 Khuzdar-II
- PB-21 Hub
