= Wadh District =

New district in Pakistan

Wadh District Brahui: وڈھ
- District
- Location within Balochistan, Pakistan Location within Pakistan
- Coordinates: 27°21′0″N 66°26′20″E
- Country: Pakistan
- Province: Balochistan
- Division: Khuzdar Division
- Headquarters: Wadh

Area
  - Total: 7,277 km^{2} (2,810 sq mi)

Population (2023)
  - Total: 261,671
  - Density: 35.96/km^{2} (93.1/sq mi)
- Time zone: UTC+5 (PST)
- Main languages: Balochi and Brahui

Wadh District is a district in the Balochistan province of Pakistan, created in 2026 from part of Khuzdar District. The town of Wadh serves as the district headquarters.

== History ==
Until its establishment as a district in 2026, it was part of Khuzdar District. In May 2026, the Government of Balochistan approved a major administrative restructuring, including splitting Khuzdar district into two new districts. Wadh District was created by merging Wadh Tehsil with Ornach Tehsil and Nal Tehsil.

== Administration ==
The district is administratively subdivided into three tehsils:

Tehsil	Area (km²)	Pop. (2023)	Density (ppl/km²) (2023)	Literacy rate (2023)
Nal Tehsil	1,791	103,631	57.86	47.26%
Wadh Tehsil	2,118	116,229	54.88	31.83%
Ornach Tehsil	3,368	41,811	12.41	21.58%
