= Baghbana Tehsil =

Pakistani administrative area

- Tehsil of Khuzdar District
- Location within Balochistan, Pakistan Location within Pakistan
- Coordinates: 28°00′54″N 66°36′01″E
- Country: Pakistan
- Province: Balochistan
- District: Khuzdar District
- Headquarter: Baghbana
- Elevation: 1,369 m (4,491 ft)

Population (2023)
  - Total: 19,325

Literacy
- Time zone: UTC+5 (PST)
- Main language: Balochi and Brahvi

Baghbana Tehsil (Note: Urdu: تحصیل باغبانہ, Brahui: تحصیل باغبانہ, Balochi: تحصیل باگبانہ) is an administrative subdivision (tehsil) of Khuzdar District in the Kalat Division of Balochistan, Pakistan. The tehsil is centred around the valley of Baghbana, a fertile region located north of the city of Khuzdar.

Baghbana, located near Khuzdar along the N-25 National Highway (N-25), is among the areas most affected by road traffic accidents in the district. Between October 2019 and December 2022, the Khuzdar–Baghbana stretch recorded 4,825 accidents, resulting in 7,133 injuries and 195 deaths, placing Baghbana among the localities with the highest number of injuries and fatalities in the province.

== Geography ==
Baghbana is situated in the central part of the Jhalawan region of Pakistan's Balochistan province, near Khuzdar. The area lies within a high-altitude valley at an average elevation of approximately approximately 1,200 metres (3,900 ft) above sea level and is surrounded by the Kirthar and the Brahui Mountains.

Compared to the surrounding arid terrain, the locality is relatively fertile, supported by seasonal streams and traditional kariz irrigation systems.

== History ==
Londo Mound is an archaeological site located about 10 kilometres (6.2 mi) north of Khuzdar along the N-25, believed to represent the remains of a large ancient settlement near a historic trade route.

Excavated materials, including pottery, bricks, animal figurines, jewellery and other artefacts—often decorated in red, black and occasionally green with motifs such as bulls, fish, birds and geometric patterns—suggest the presence of a fortified urban centre.

== Demographics ==
According to the 2023 Population and Housing Census of Pakistan, the majority of the population in Baghbana belongs to the Brahui and Baloch tribes. The principal language spoken is Brahvi, with Balochi also being widely used.

== Administration ==
The tehsil is administered as part of the Khuzdar District and is divided into several Union Councils. These include, but are not limited to:

- Baghbana (urban/rural)
- Bajori (urban/rural)

== Economy ==
The economy of Baghbana is predominantly agricultural. Due to its fertile soil, it is a significant producer of wheat, barley, and various fruits. Livestock herding, particularly sheep and goats, is a traditional mainstay for the rural inhabitants. The tehsil also benefits from its proximity to the N-25 (RCD Highway), which connects it to Quetta and Karachi.

== See also ==
- List of tehsils of Pakistan
  - List of tehsils of Balochistan
