= Gandakha Tehsil =

Administrative area in Balochistan, Pakistan

- Tehsil
- تحصیل گنداخہ
- Location within Balochistan, Pakistan Location within Pakistan
- Country: Pakistan
- Province: Balochistan
- District: Usta Muhammad District
- Headquarters: Gandakha

Area
  - Tehsil: 554 km^{2} (214 sq mi)
- Elevation: 40 m (130 ft)

Population (2023)
  - Tehsil: 81,190
  - Density: 147/km^{2} (380/sq mi)
  - Rural: 81,190 (100%)

Literacy (2023)
  - Literacy rate: 24.59%
- Time zone: UTC+5 (PST)
- Calling code: 0838

Gandakha Tehsil is an administrative subdivision (tehsil) of Usta Muhammad District in Balochistan, Pakistan, with its headquarters at the town of Gandakha. Usta Muhammad District is divided into two tehsils, the other being Usta Muhammad. The tehsil lies in the low-lying Kacchi Plain of eastern Balochistan, close to the border with Sindh.

== History ==
Usta Muhammad District, and with it Gandakha Tehsil's current administrative placement, was created in September 2022 through the division of the former Jafarabad District. Before this reorganisation, Gandakha was administered as a tehsil of Jafarabad District.

== Geography ==
Gandakha Tehsil covers approximately 554 square kilometres and lies at a low elevation of around 40 metres above sea level, within the alluvial Kacchi Plain, a flat, fertile lowland formed by sediment deposited by seasonal hill torrents draining the surrounding highlands. The plain lacks natural surface water for irrigation or drinking and depends on canal systems and floodwater for cultivation.

== Climate ==
Located in the Kacchi Plain, Gandakha Tehsil experiences a subtropical desert climate similar to neighbouring low-lying districts such as Sibi and Jaffarabad, characterised by extremely hot summers, mild winters, and low annual rainfall. Jaffarabad district, adjoining Usta Muhammad District, has been named among Balochistan's hottest districts during provincial heatwave alerts, alongside Sibi and Dera Murad Jamali.

== Demographics ==
=== Population ===
Historical population
Year	Pop.	±% p.a.
1951	...	—
1961	23,983	—
1972	34,721	+3.42%
1981	45,830	+3.13%
1998	57,727	+1.37%
2017	74,880	+1.38%
2023	81,190	+1.36%
Source: Pakistan Bureau of Statistics.

As of the 2023 census, Gandakha Tehsil had a population of 81,190 living in 14,259 households, with the entire population classified as rural. The overall literacy rate stood at 24.59 per cent. A gender disparity was evident in this figure, with male literacy at 33.82 per cent against female literacy of 15.27 per cent.

== Economy ==
The tehsil's economy is predominantly agricultural, relying on irrigation supplied through the Pat Feeder Canal system, which draws water from the Indus River via the Guddu Barrage to serve the Kacchi Plain, including parts of the former Jaffarabad district. Reduced canal capacity, caused by siltation and seepage losses, has left substantial areas of the plain's cultivable command area without reliable irrigation supplies.

The tehsil is highly vulnerable to seasonal flooding. Eastern Balochistan, including the Jaffarabad and Nasirabad areas surrounding Gandakha, experienced severe flooding in 2010 and again in September 2012, when a breach in the Pat Feeder Canal cut off several districts and displaced thousands of people. During the 2022 Pakistan floods, Gandakha town itself was affected by inadequate drainage infrastructure: a canal intended to drain floodwater from Gandakha toward Sindh had only one of its five gates open, with the rest sealed with cement, contributing to prolonged flooding in the town. Residents and local volunteers reported that international humanitarian access to the area remained limited during the recovery period, which they attributed in part to bureaucratic restrictions on foreign aid organisations operating in Balochistan.
