= Khuzdar Division =

Administrative division of Balochistan, Pakistan

Khuzdar Division خضدار ڈویژن تقسیم خضدار
- Division
- Interactive map of Khuzdar Division
- Coordinates: 27°30′N 66°00′E
- Country: Pakistan
- Province: Balochistan
- Capital: Khuzdar
- Established: 11 July 2026; 4 months ago
- Districts: 04: Kalat District Khuzdar District Wadh District Surab District

Government
  - Type: Divisional Administration
  - Commissioner: Dawood Khan Khilji
  - Constituencies: NA-256 Khuzdar; NA-261 Surab-cum-Kalat-cum-Mastung

Area
  - Division: 91,767 km^{2} (35,431 sq mi)
- Elevation: 2,007 m (6,585 ft)

Population (2023)
  - Division: 2,719,964
  - Density: 29.65/km^{2} (76.8/sq mi)
  - Urban: 863,081 (31.72%)
  - Rural: 1,857,937 (68.28%)
- Demonym: Khuzdari

Language Speakers (2023)
  - Native Speakers: Largest: Brahvis (58.5%); Others: Balochs (35.87%)

Literacy (2023)
  - Literacy rate: Total: (38.72%); Male: (47.04%); Female: (29.67%)
- Time zone: UTC+05:00 (PKT)
  - Summer (DST): DST is not observed
- ZIP Code: 89100
- NWD (area) code: 844
- ISO 3166 code: PK-BA

Khuzdar Division (Urdu: خضدار ڈویژن) is an administrative division of Balochistan province of Pakistan. Its capital city is Khuzdar founded on 11 July 2026 after the restructuring of former Kalat Division. According to 2023 Pakistani census, the current population of the Division is 2,719,964 (2.7 million).

== Administration ==
The Khuzdar Division consists of :

- Khuzdar District
- Kalat District
- Surab District
- Wadh District
