= Tump (disambiguation) =

Tump is an English word meaning a hillock, mound, barrow or tumulus.

Tump may also refer to:

- Tump, Balochistan, Town and Tehsil in Pakistan
- TuMP, a hill in the United Kingdom with a Thirty and upwards Metre Prominence
- "The Tump", a location in the fictional city-state of Ankh-Morpork in the Discworld series

== See also ==
- Tumpline, a strap over the forehead used for carrying loads
- Trump (disambiguation)
