= Shashan Mountains =

Mountain range in Pakistan

Koh-e-Shashan, Shashan Mountains
- کوہ شاشان / کوہ ء شاشان
- Location within Pakistan

Highest point
- Elevation: 3,194 m (10,479 ft)
- Coordinates: 27°32′30″N 66°02′16″E

Geography
- Location: Khuzdar, Pakistan

Geology
- Mountain type: Mountain range

Shashan or Koh-e-Shashan (Urdu: شاشان) is one of the highest mountains of Balochistan located in Gresha, Khuzdar District. the front side of Shashan is situated in Bidrang Area of Gresha and the back side ends in Hazar Ganji area of Nall Khuzdar, it's a very difficult mountain range similar to Tora Bora of Afghanistan, it has been a stronghold for insurgents of Khuzdar and Awaran, Districts of Balochistan,

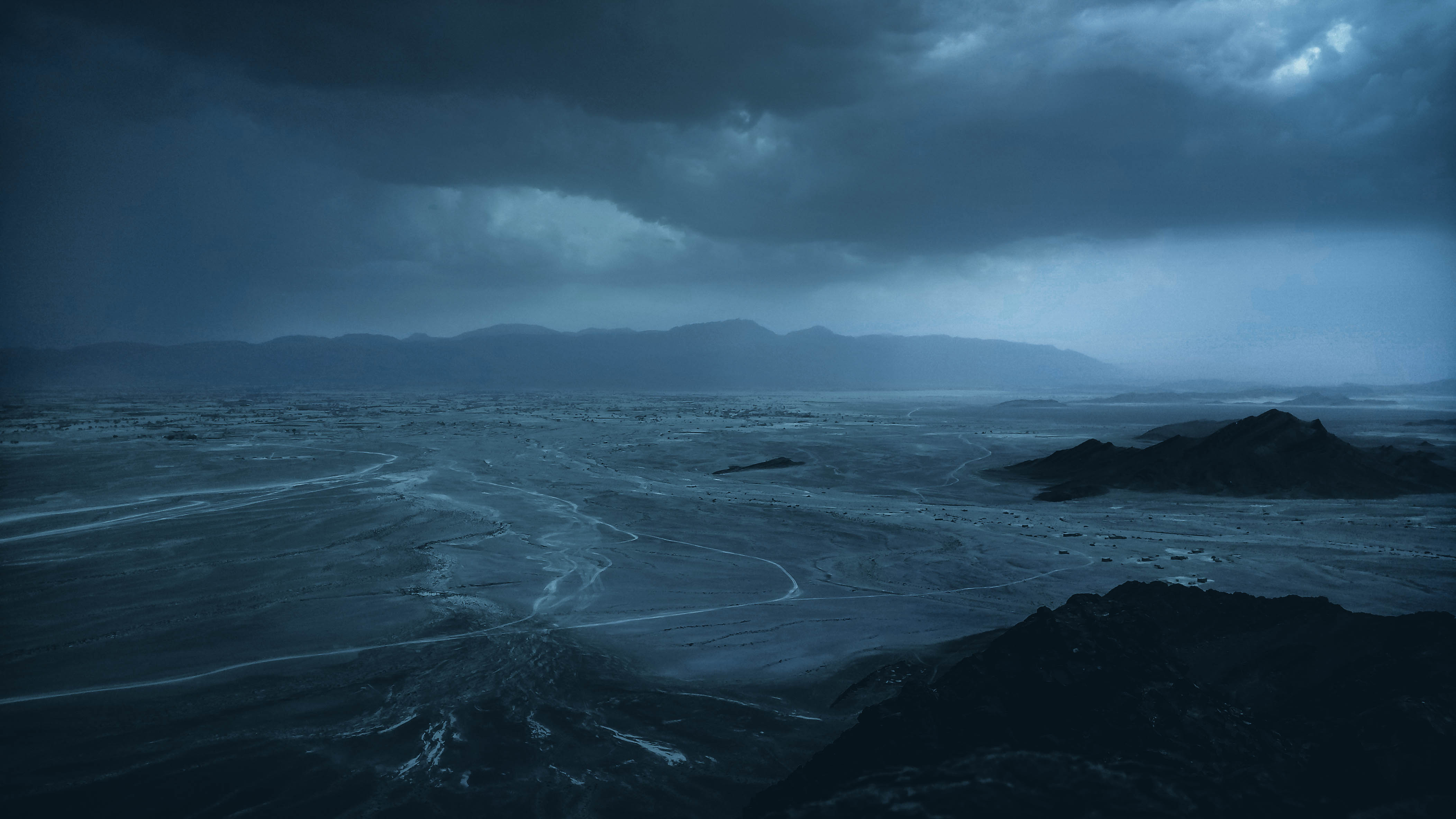
Gresha Khuzdar, Shashan

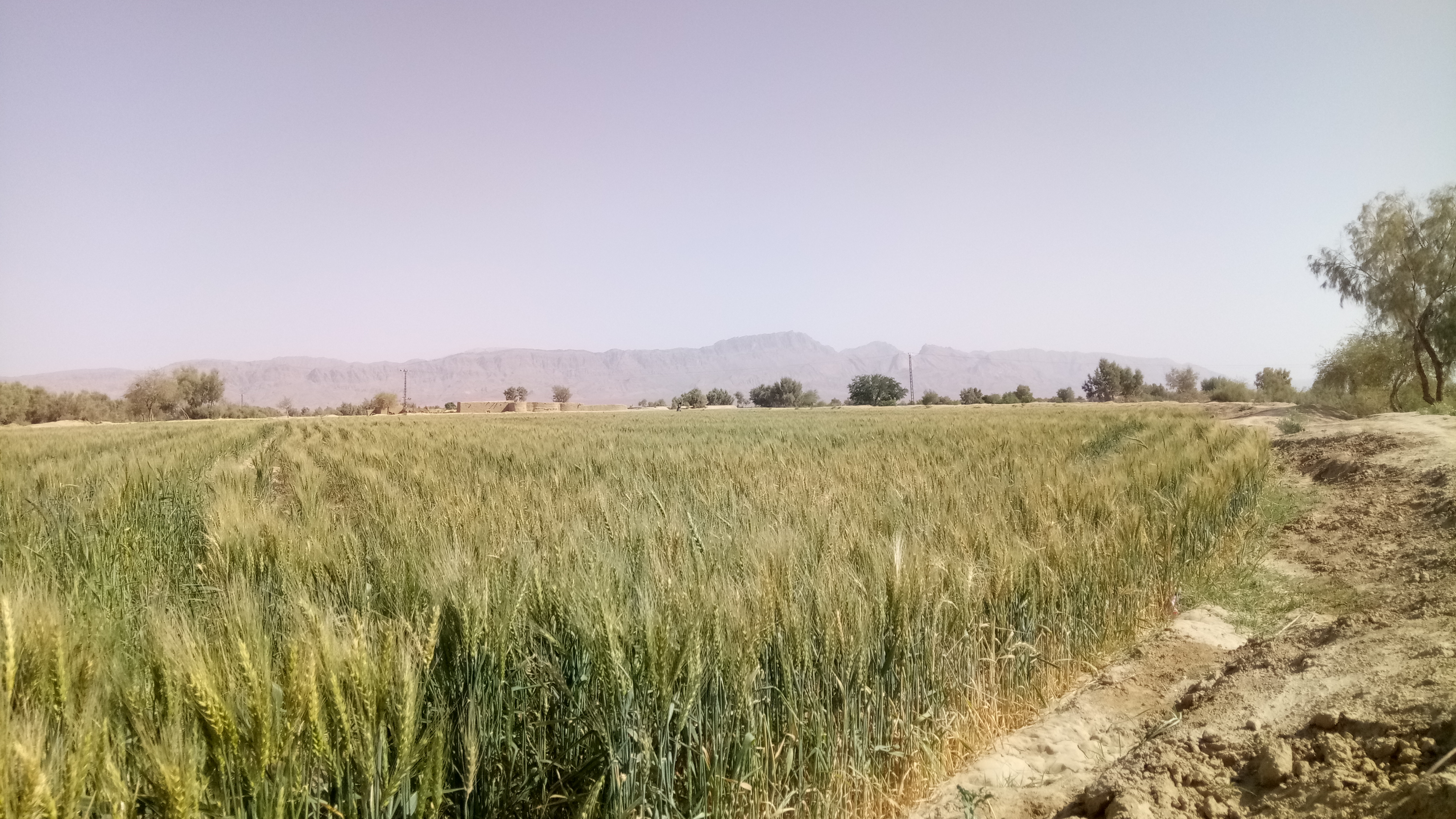
Shashan Mountains Range
