= PB-19 Khuzdar-II =

Constituency of the Provincial Assembly of Balochistan, Pakistan

- Constituency for the Provincial Assembly of Balochistan
- Region: Khuzdar Tehsil (partly) including Khuzdar city of Khuzdar District

Current constituency
- Party: Muttahida Majlis-e-Amal
- Member: Mir Younus Aziz Zehri
- Created from: PB-34 (Khuzdar-II)

PB-19 Khuzdar-II (پی بی-19 خضدار-2) is a constituency of the Provincial Assembly of Balochistan.

== General elections 2024 ==
Provincial election 2024: PB-19 Khuzdar-II
Party	Candidate	Votes	%	±%
JUI (F)	Mir Younus Aziz Zehri	19,218	35.68	
PPP	Shakeel Ahmed Durrani	15,212	28.24	
NP	Sardar Muhammad Aslam Bizanjo	14,794	27.47	
TLP	Atta Muhammad	1,666	3.09	
Others	Others (fifteen candidates)	2,970	5.52	
Turnout		56,909	45.40	
Total valid votes		53,860	94.64	
Rejected ballots		3,049	5.36	
Majority		4,006	7.44	
Registered electors		125,357		

== General elections 2013 ==
Contesting candidates	Party affiliation	Votes polled

== General elections 2008 ==
Contesting candidates	Party affiliation	Votes polled

== See also ==
- PB-18 Khuzdar-I
- PB-20 Khuzdar-III
