= Tharia Cave Paintings =

Prehistoric paintings

The Tharia Cave paintings are prehistoric paintings which have been discovered in March 2015 at Tharia Cave, the most ancient rock shelter in Pabu Mountain, located near the Qili village, Chatoka Bhit, Pallimas Valley, Tahseel Wadh, Khuzdar District of Balochistan, a western province of Pakistan. The paintings represented on the rock shelter are divided into five panels. The Tharia Cave paintings show dancing men in a row and straight line, humped bulls and deer-like animals. Most probably, the cave paintings belong to the Paleolithic period.

The cave is 15 km west of Wadh, where the hilly torrents such as Kunj and others flow from Pubu Mountain towards Pallimas valley.
