= Mir Younus Aziz Zehri =

Pakistani politician

Member of the Provincial Assembly of the Balochistan
- In office 13 August 2018 – 12 August 2023
- Constituency: PB-39 Khuzdar-II

Personal details
- Party: JUI (F) (2018-present)
- Children: 3

Mir Younus Aziz Zehri is a Pakistani politician who is currently the Leader of the Opposition in the Provincial Assembly of Balochistan. He is a member of the assembly from PB-19 Khuzdar-II since 2024 and had been a member of the Provincial Assembly of the Balochistan from August 2018 to August 2023.

== Political career ==
He was elected to the Provincial Assembly of the Balochistan as a candidate of Muttahida Majlis-e-Amal (MMA) from Constituency PB-39 (Khuzdar-II) in the 2018 Pakistani general election. Following his successful election, MMA nominated him for the office of Chief Minister of Balochistan. On 18 August 2018, he received 20 votes and lost the seat to Jam Kamal Khan who secured 39 votes. He was elected as a Member of the Provincial Assembly (MPA) for the second time after he contested as a JUI-F candidate from PB-19 Khuzdar-II and received 19137 votes, beating runner-up Agha Shakeel Ahmed Durrani of the Pakistan Peoples Party in the 2024 Pakistani general election.

He was elected as Leader of the Opposition in the Balochistan Assembly on 28 February 2024 and is serving today.
