= Saroona Tehsil =

Pakistani administrative area

Saroona Balochi: تحصیل سرونا
- Tehsil of Khuzdar District
- Location within Balochistan, Pakistan Location within Pakistan
- Coordinates: 26°13′N 67°05′E
- Country: Pakistan
- Province: Balochistan
- District: Khuzdar District
- Headquarter: Saroona

Area
  - Tehsil of Khuzdar District: 3,257 km^{2} (1,258 sq mi)
- Elevation: 381 m (1,250 ft)

Population (2023)
  - Tehsil of Khuzdar District: 36,380
  - Density: 11.17/km^{2} (28.9/sq mi)
  - Rural: 36,380

Literacy
  - Literacy rate: 24.22%
- Time zone: UTC+5 (PST)
- Main languages: 30,939 Brahui, 5,331 Balochi

Saroona (Note: Balochi: سرونا; Urdu: سرونا, pronounced [saːˈruːnaː]) is an administrative subdivision (tehsil) of Khuzdar District in Balochistan, Pakistan. It is one of ten administrative units, comprising tehsils and sub-tehsils, in the district, alongside Aranji, Gresha, Karakh, Khuzdar, Moola, Nal, Ornach, Wadh, and Zehri. The tehsil spans an area of 3,257 square kilometres and is predominantly characterised by mountainous and arid terrain. It is the southernmost part of the district, extending from Khuzdar District's northern boundary deep into the adjoining Lasbela District.

== Population ==
Historical population
Year	Pop.	±% p.a.
1951	...	—
1961	...	—
1972	...	—
1981	13,684	—
1998	20,580	+2.43%
2017	32,125	+2.37%
2023	36,380	+2.09%
Source: Pakistan Bureau of Statistics:

According to the 2023 national census, Saroona tehsil has a population of 36,380, all of whom reside in rural areas. The entire tehsil comprises just 6,480 households. This makes it one of the most rural and sparsely populated tehsils in the district.

The overall literacy rate stands at 24.22%, with 28% of the male population being literate, while the female literacy rate is significantly lower at 19.68%.

Access to safe drinking water is a major issue in the tehsil. Community involvement, especially by women, who are the primary collectors of water, is crucial, particularly in addressing sanitation challenges.

== Languages ==
Languages of Saroona tehsil (2023)
1. Brahui (85.0%)
2. Balochi (14.7%)
3. Others (0.29%)

In Saroona Tehsil, Brahui is the predominant language, spoken by approximately 30,939 people (85.05% of the population), followed by Balochi, spoken by around 5,331 individuals (14.66%). The dominance of Brahui reflects the tehsil's historical roots as part of the central Brahui-speaking highlands of Balochistan, where tribal and cultural affiliations have preserved the language over centuries. Balochi, while present, plays a secondary role in local communication, often coexisting with Brahui in multilingual households and public life.
