= Gresha Tehsil =

Pakistani administrative area

Gresha گریشا
- Tehsil of Khuzdar District
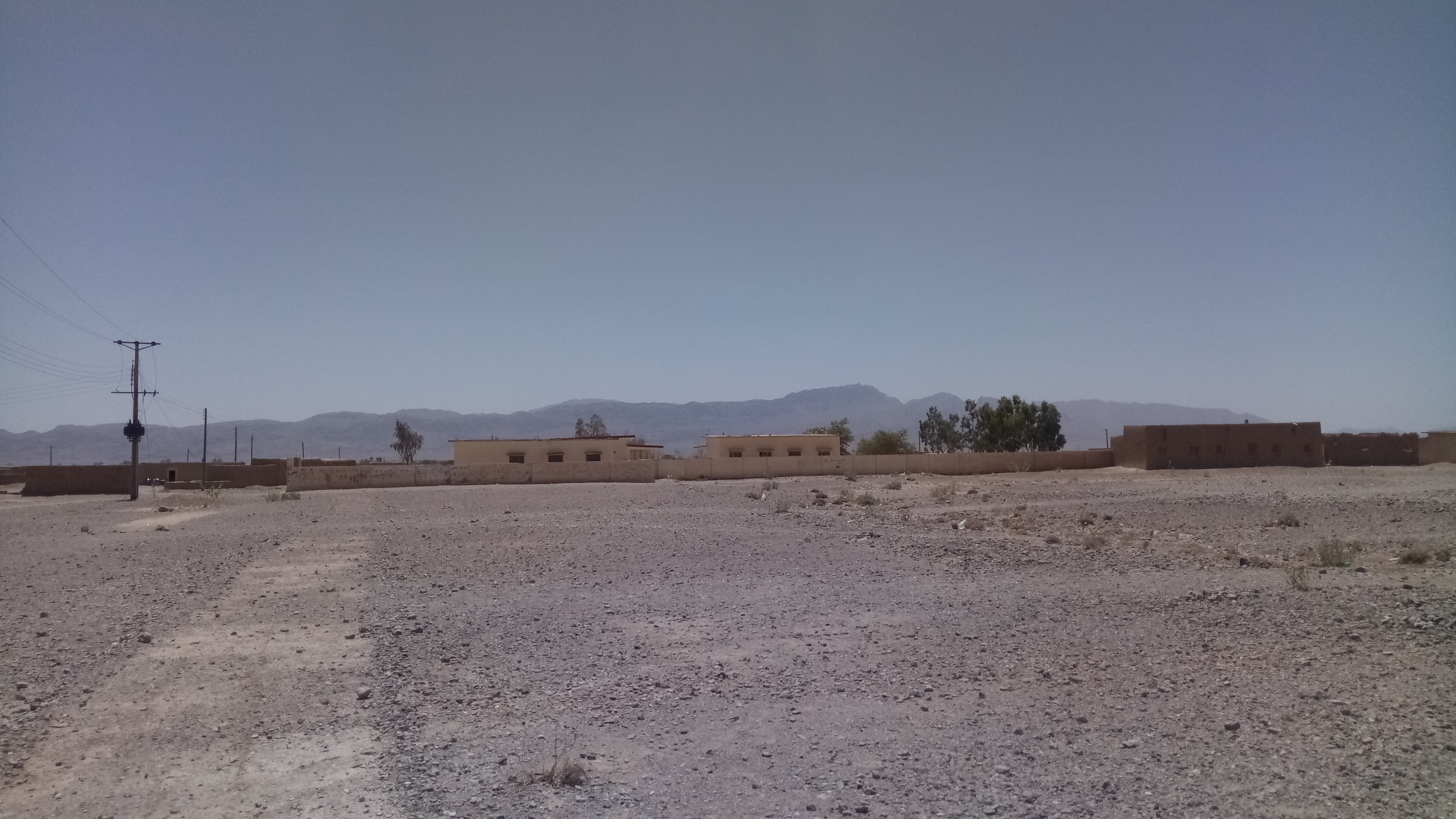
- Shashan Mountains in background.

- Location within Balochistan, Pakistan Location within Pakistan
- Coordinates: 27°36′1″N 65°56′1″E
- Country: Pakistan
- Province: Balochistan
- District: Khuzdar District
- Tehsil: Gresha

Area
  - Tehsil of Khuzdar District: 2,622 km^{2} (1,012 sq mi)

Population (2023)
  - Tehsil of Khuzdar District: 69,665
  - Density: 26.57/km^{2} (68.8/sq mi)
  - Urban: -
  - Rural: 69,665

Literacy
  - Literacy rate: 21.10%
- Time zone: UTC+5 (PST)
- Main language: 45,839 Balochi, 23,362 Brahui

Gresha, locally pronounced as Greshag or Greshak (Brahui: گریشا; Balochi: گریشا, pronounced [ɡɾeːˈʃə]) is an administrative subdivision (Tehsil) of Khuzdar District in Balochistan, Pakistan. It is one of ten administrative units, comprising tehsils and sub-tehsils, in the district, alongside Aranji, Karakh, Khuzdar, Moola, Nal, Ornach, Saroona, Wadh, and Zehri. The tehsil spans an area of 2,622 square kilometres and is located south-west of Nal.

== Population ==
Historical population
Year	Pop.	±% p.a.
1951	...	—
1961	...	—
1972	...	—
1981	...	—
1998	...	—
2017	45,648	—
2023	69,665	+7.30%

According to the 2023 national census, Gresha has a population of 69,665, all residing in rural areas, making it one of the more sparsely populated regions of the district. The tehsil consists of 9,920 households.

== Education ==
The tehsil faces significant development challenges, particularly due to limited access to education and the absence of a functioning healthcare system. The literacy rate in the tehsil stands at 21.10%, reflecting limited access to formal education. This includes a male literacy rate of 27.06% and a significantly lower female literacy rate of just 16.38%, underscoring a notable gender gap in educational attainment.
