= Baluchistan States Union =

Former administrative division of Pakistan (1952–1955)

- Subdivision of Pakistan
- 1952–1955
- Flag

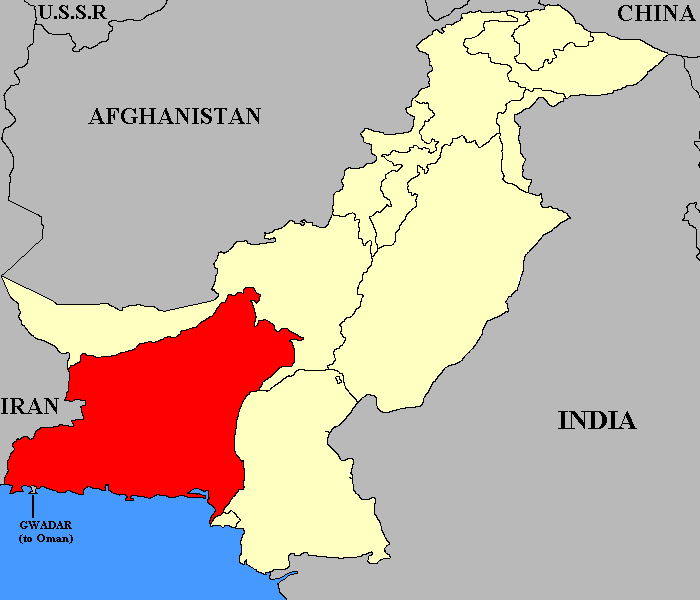
- Map of Pakistan with Baluchistan States Union highlighted in red
- Capital: Kalat
- Area
- 206,382 km^{2} (79,685 sq mi)
- History
  - Established: 3 October 1952
  - Disestablished: 14 October 1955
Succeeded by
West Pakistan
- Government of Balochistan

The Baluchistan States Union or Balochistan States Union (BSU) was an administrative division of Pakistan that existed between 3 October 1952 and 14 October 1955 in the southwestern part of West Pakistan. It was formed by the four princely states of Kalat, Kharan, Las Bela and Makran with the capital at the town of Kalat. The area of the Union was roughly the south-western half of the modern province of Balochistan. The Union was separate from the Chief Commissioners Province of Baluchistan which comprised areas to the northeast of the Union. The Union did not include the enclave of Gwadar which was part of Muscat and Oman. The four state rulers continued in office and retained autonomy.

The BSU was formed after the accession of four individual princely states to the new Dominion of Pakistan in 1948. The area became the Kalat Division when the Union was dissolved. The first head of the Union was the Khan of Kalat, Ahmad of Kalat. The main governing body was the Council of Rulers which comprised the Khan-e-Azam Khan of Kalat, the Jam of Lasbela and the Nawabs of Kharan and Makran. Decisions on major issues could be taken by a jirga or council of all the nobles or sardars of the Union.

== See also ==
- Princely states of Pakistan
- Balochistan province
- Baluchistan
- Baluchistan (Chief Commissioners Province)
- Makran
- Las Bela
- Kharan
- Khanate of Kalat
- Sarawan
- Jhalawan
- Kachhi
- Bolan
- Dera Bugti
- Kohlu
- Politics of Pakistan
- History of Pakistan
