= Nal, Balochistan =

Town in Balochistan, Pakistan

Nal نال
- Town
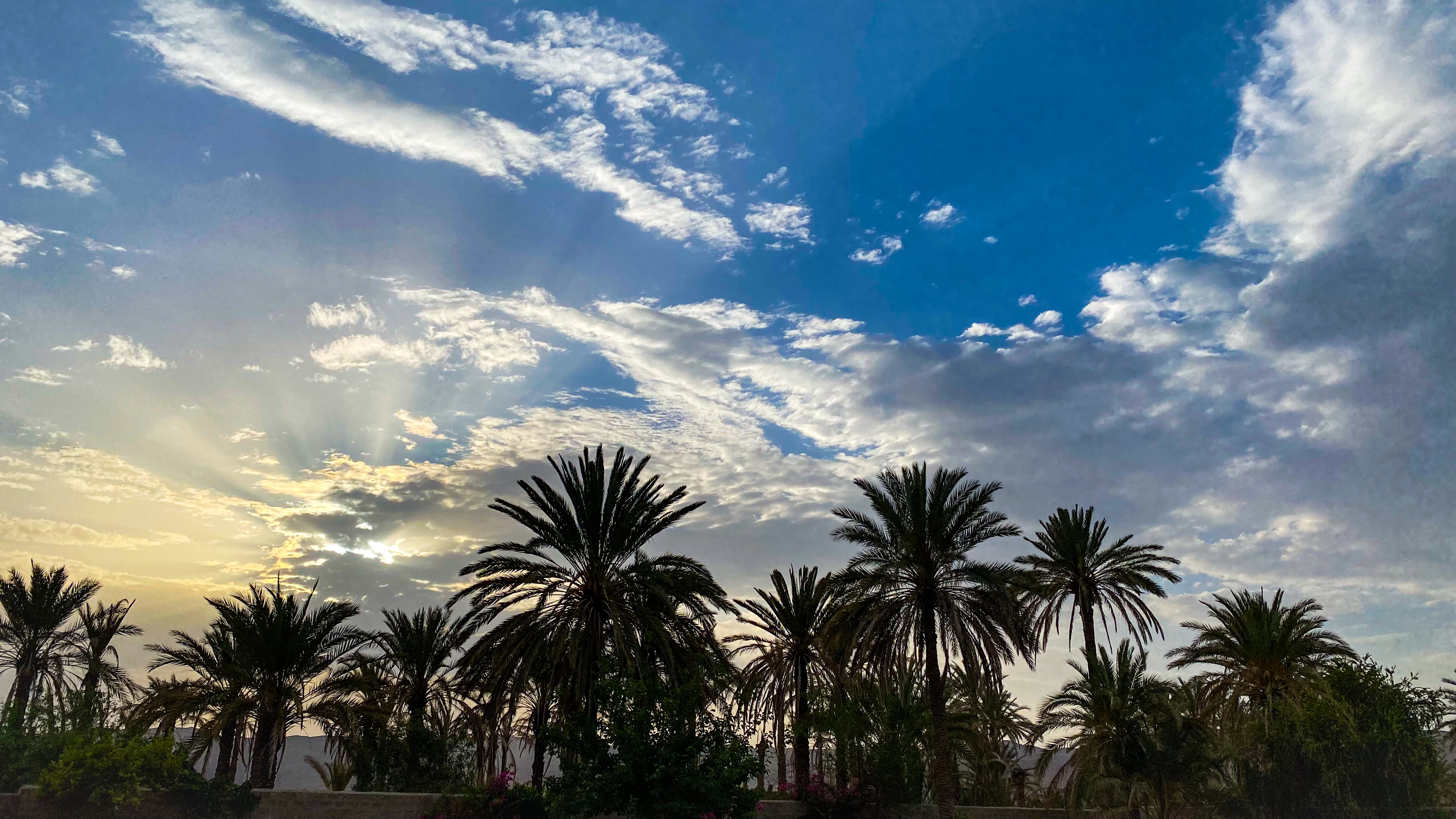
- Evening view of date palm trees in Naal, Balochistan

- Location within Pakistan
- Coordinates: 27.685°N 66.192°E
- Country: Pakistan
- Province: Balochistan
- Division: Kalat Division
- District: Khuzdar District
- Municipality: Nal

Area
  - Total: 1,791 km^{2} (692 sq mi)

Population (2023)
  - Total: 48,481
  - Density: 57.86/km^{2} (149.9/sq mi)

Literacy
  - Literacy rate: 54.44%
- Time zone: UTC+05:00 (Pakistan Standard Time)
- Area code: +92848
- Main language: Balochi, Brahui

Nal, also spelled Naal (Urdu: نال; Balochi: نال, pronounced [nɑːl]) is the third largest urban centre in the Khuzdar District, in the province of Balochistan, Pakistan. Home to 6,167 households, it serves as the administrative centre of Nal Tehsil.

== History ==
The town and its surroundings are historically significant due to its association with the prehistoric Amri-Nal culture, which flourished between 3800 and 2300 BCE. The nearby archaeological site of Sohr Damb (also known as Red Mound) has yielded artifacts indicative of early urban planning and distinctive pottery styles. These findings suggest that Nal was part of a complex society that predated the Indus Valley Civilisation. The Nal pottery (3100-2800BC) have figurative motifs and polychrome decoration.

In modern history, Nal has been notable as the hometown of prominent Baloch leaders, including Ghaus Bakhsh Bizenjo, who played a pivotal role in Balochistan's political landscape. The town's water needs were supported by Karez system, a traditional water channel that flows from the nearby mountains in a series of connected underground wells and channels water across the valley using gravity as a force.

== Economy ==
The economy of Nal primarily revolves around agriculture, livestock rearing, and mining. The fertile valley supports the cultivation of crops such as wheat, barley, and dates. Livestock, including goats and sheep, are reared for meat and wool. Additionally, the region is rich in mineral resources, with marble and chromite mining contributing to the local economy. Town's hand-made Balochi embroidery, locally known as Doch, is well known across the district.

== Demographics ==
=== Population ===
Historical population
Year	Pop.	±% p.a.
2017	33,299	—
2023	48,481	+6.46%

According to Pakistan Bureau of Statistics survey in 2023, Nal has a total population of 48,481. In total, the town encompasses 6,167 households. The literacy rate in Nal stands at 54.44%, reflecting ongoing challenges in access to education. This includes a male literacy rate of 59.49% and a significantly lower female literacy rate of 48.48%, indicating a persistent gender gap in educational attainment.

=== Language ===
Languages of Nal (2023 Census)
1. Balochi (98.3%)
2. Brahui (1.47%)
3. Others (0.23%)

Nal's population predominantly comprises Baloch. The predominant spoken languages are Balochi and Brahui, whereas Urdu is used for official and educational purposes.

== Culture ==
The community maintains rich traditions in music, dance (do-chaapi), and storytelling.

== Archaeology ==
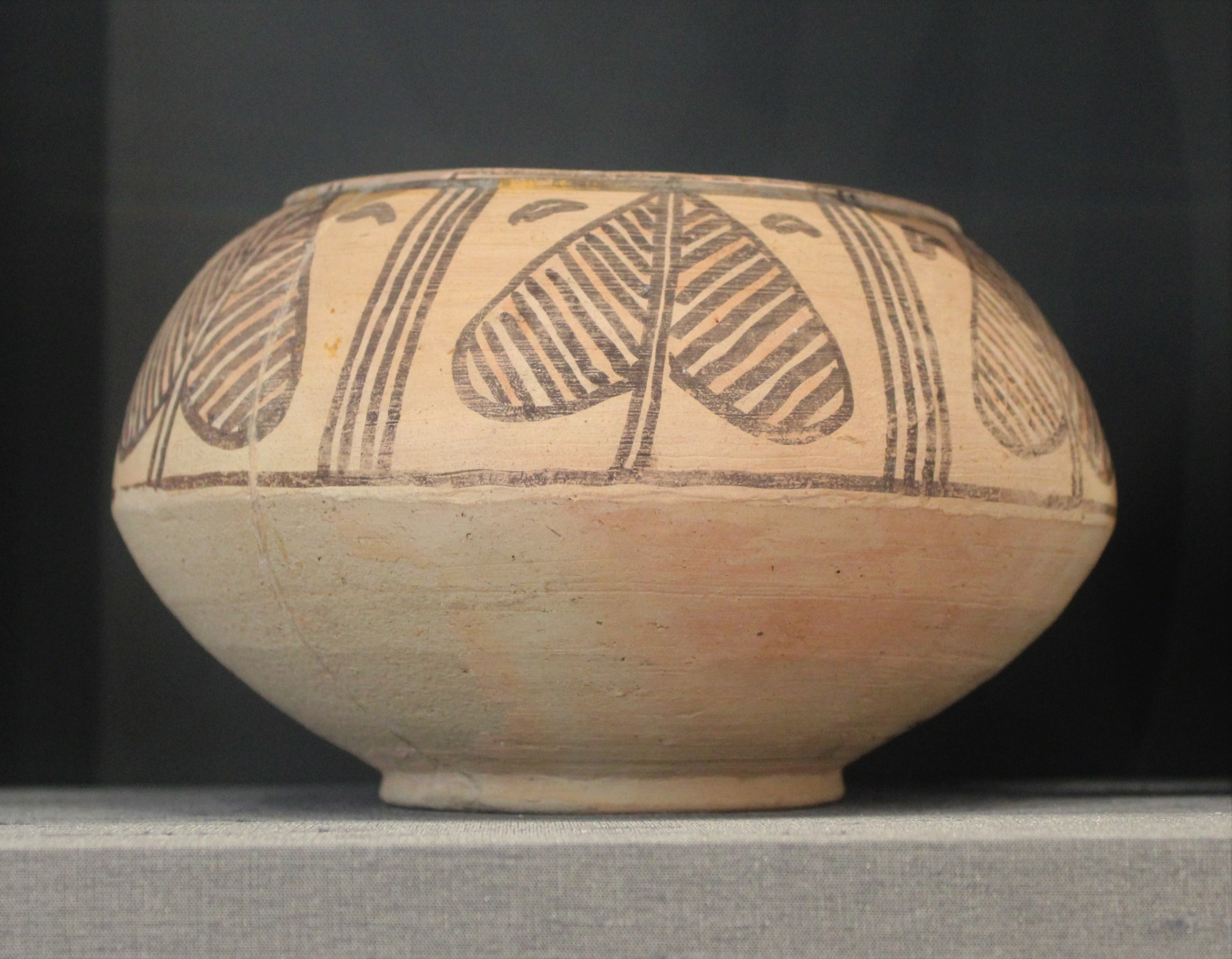
Bowl decorated in brown paint on off-white. Nal pottery, Baluchistan. From Sohr Damb mound, Pakistan. 3rd millennium BC. British Museum, London

The Sohr Damb site near Nal has been the focus of archaeological excavations revealing a sequence of cultural phases. Artefacts unearthed include polychrome pottery, terracotta figurines, and evidence of early urban planning. These discoveries provide insight into the social and economic structures of the Amri-Nal culture and its connections to other contemporary civilisations. The excavations has taken place in different periods, for instance, Harold Hargreaves led an excavation party in 1924s.
