= Zehri, Balochistan =

Pakistani town

Zehri
- Town
- Location within Balochistan, Pakistan
- Coordinates: 28°34′15″N 66°45′08″E
- Country: Pakistan
- Province: Balochistan
- Division: Makran Khan
- District: Kalat
- Tehsil: Zehri Tehsil

Population (2023)
  - Total: 70,910
- Time zone: UTC+5 (PST)

Zehri (Brahui: زہری; Balochi: زہری, pronounced [zəɦˈriː]) is the second-largest town in Khuzdar District, Balochistan, Pakistan. The town is the administrative centre of the Zehri Tehsil. It serves as the administrative headquarters of Zehri Tehsil and is situated approximately 80 kilometres north of Khuzdar, the district capital.

Zehri hosts a sizable market and has experienced rapid urban growth. Between 2017 and 2023, it recorded an average annual population growth rate of 11%, making it one of the fastest-growing towns in the province.

== Demographics ==
=== Population ===
Historical population
Year	Pop.	±% p.a.
1998	13,397	—
2017	37,788	+5.61%
2023	70,910	+11.06%

The population of Zehri town in 2017 was 37,788. According to the 2023 Census of Pakistan, the population had risen to 70,910.

Languages

Languages of Zehri (2023 Census)
1. Brahui (99.6%)
2. Urdu (0.10%)
3. Balochi (0.07%)
4. Others (0.23%)
