= Aranji Tehsil =

Pakistani administrative area

Aranji
- Tehsil of Khuzdar District
- Location within Balochistan, Pakistan Location within Pakistan
- Coordinates: 26°34′7″N 66°26′0″E
- Country: Pakistan
- Province: Balochistan
- District: Khuzdar District
- Headquarter: Aranji

Area
  - Tehsil of Khuzdar District: 7,456 km^{2} (2,879 sq mi)

Population (2023)
  - Tehsil of Khuzdar District: 50,533
  - Density: 6.78/km^{2} (17.6/sq mi)
  - Urban: -
  - Rural: 50,533

Literacy
  - Literacy rate: 12.11%
- Time zone: UTC+5 (PST)
- Main language: 48,420 Brahui, 1,135 Balochi

Aranji (Note: Balochi: ارنجی, Brahui: ارنجی, Urdu: ارنجی, pronounced [ɑːˈrənd͡ʒi]) is an administrative subdivision (tehsil) of Khuzdar District in Balochistan, Pakistan. It is one of ten administrative units, comprising tehsils and sub-tehsils, in the district, alongside Gresha, Karakh, Khuzdar, Moola, Nal, Ornach, Saroona, Wadh, and Zehri.

The tehsil covers an area of 7,456 square kilometres, consisting predominantly of mountainous terrain. It is situated north of Bela and extends mainly east of the N-25 National Highway, reaching the Kirthar Mountains along the border with Sindh.

== Climate ==
Historical population
Year	Pop.	±% p.a.
1951	...	—
1961	...	—
1972	...	—
1981	37,155	—
1998	28,561	−1.54%
2017	42,318	+2.09%
2023	50,533	+3.00%
Source: Pakistan Bureau of Statistics:

The Tehsil is frequently affected by extreme climatic conditions, including heatwaves, reduced precipitation, and prolonged droughts. In 2022, it experienced both a significant earthquake and an extended period of heavy rainfall, which led to widespread flooding. These events resulted in severe damage to housing, agricultural land, and livestock, exacerbating the area's existing vulnerabilities.

== Poverty ==
Extreme poverty is widespread across the Tehsil. Access to basic services such as electricity, infrastructure, and clean water remains limited and inconsistent, with such provisions often being the exception rather than the norm.

Languages of Aranji Tehsil (2023)
1. Brahui (95.8%)
2. Balochi (2.25%)
3. Others (1.92%)

== Population ==
According to the 2023 national census, Aranji has a population of 50,533, all residing in rural areas. This makes it one of the more sparsely populated areas in the district. The literacy rate stands at 12.11%, with the male literacy rate at 17.67% and female literacy rate at just 5.40%, among the lowest in Balochistan.

== Poverty ==
Extreme poverty is widespread across the Tehsil. Access to basic services such as electricity, infrastructure, and clean water remains limited and inconsistent, with such provisions often being the exception rather than the norm.

== Languages ==
In Aranji Tehsil, Brahvi is the predominant language, spoken by approximately 48,420 people (95.8% of the population), followed by Balochi, spoken by around 1,135 individuals (2.3%).

The dominance of Brahui reflects the Tehsil's historical roots as part of the central Brahui-speaking highlands of Balochistan, where tribal and cultural affiliations have preserved the language over centuries. Balochi, while present, plays a secondary role in local communication, often coexisting with Brahui in multilingual households and public life.
