= Kharan =

Kharan can refer to:

- Kharan, Pakistan, city in Balochistan.
- Kharan District, district of Balochistan, Pakistan
- Kharan (princely state), former princely state
- Kharan Desert
- The upper Halil River
- Haran, Azerbaijan
