= Hamarmeşə =

Human settlement in Azerbaijan

Coordinates: 38°46′N 48°36′E

Hamarmeşə (Talysh: Həmoəvişə) is a village and municipality in the Lerik Rayon of Azerbaijan. It has a population of 673. The municipality consists of the villages of Hamarmeşə, Şifəkəran, and Haran.

== Geography ==
Hamarmeşə is located in the mountainous landscape of southeastern Azerbaijan in the Talysh Mountains, a region characterized by forests, agricultural land, and deep valleys.

The broader region contains numerous villages connected to nearby towns by rural roads and agricultural routes.

== Administration ==
The village belongs to the municipal administrative system of Azerbaijan. The country is divided into districts known as rayons, which contain municipalities made up of towns and villages.

Local municipalities typically oversee community infrastructure, agriculture management, and village services.

== Economy ==
Like many rural communities in Azerbaijan, the local economy traditionally relies on:

- small-scale agriculture
- livestock breeding
- orchard farming

Agriculture plays a significant role in rural districts across the country.
