= Pallimas Valley =

Valley in Khuzdar, Pakistan

The Pallimas Valley (Urdu: وادئ پلیماس; Sindhi: وادي پلیماس) is a valley in Wadh Tehsil, near Wadh town of Khuzdar District, Balochistan, a western province of Pakistan. The Kunj and other hill torrents flow from mountainous area towards the valley. The ancient inscriptions and Tharia Cave Paintings have been discovered in the vicinity of Pallimas Valley as well. Many historical and archaeological sites are located in the valley which possibly date from the prehistoric Amri-Nal civilisation.
