= Mir Jahanzaib Mengal =

Member of the Provincial Assembly of Balochistan from Khuzdar (2024–2029)

- میر جہانزیب مینگل

Member of the Provincial Assembly of Balochistan
- Incumbent
- Assumed office 29 April 2024
- Constituency: PB-20 Khuzdar-III

Personal details
- Party: BNP(M) (2024-present)

Mir Jahanzaib Mengal (Urdu: میر جہانزیب مینگل) is a Pakistani politician who is member-elect of the Provincial Assembly of Balochistan.

== Political career ==
Mengal won the 2024 Pakistani by-elections from PB-20 Khuzdar-III as a Balochistan National Party (Mengal) candidate. He received 30,455 votes while runner up Independent candidate Mir Shafiqur Rehman Mengal received 14,311 votes.
