= Gandakha =

- Town
- گنداخہ
- Location within Balochistan, Pakistan Location within Pakistan
- Coordinates: 28.1°N 67.51°E
- Country: Pakistan
- Province: Balochistan
- District: Usta Muhammad District

Area
  - Total: 554 km^{2} (214 sq mi)
- Elevation: 40 m (130 ft)

Population (2023)
  - Total: 81,190

Literacy (2023)
  - Literacy rate: 24.59%
- Time zone: UTC+5 (PST)
- Calling code: 0838

Gandakha is a town in Usta Muhammad District in Balochistan, Pakistan. It is located close to Sindh Border. Gandakha faces a shortage of water in Kharif (Summer) season, due to which Zamindar of area bear huge losses.

== Demographics ==
=== Population ===
Historical population
Year	Pop.	±% p.a.
1951	...	—
1961	23,983	—
1972	34,721	+3.42%
1981	45,830	+3.13%
1998	57,727	+1.37%
2017	74,880	+1.38%
2023	81,190	+1.36%
Source: Pakistan Bureau of Statistics.

As of the 2023 census, Gandakha Tehsil had a population of 81,190 living in 14,259 households, with the entire population classified as rural. The overall literacy rate stood at 24.59 per cent. A gender disparity was evident in this figure, with male literacy at 33.82 per cent against female literacy of 15.27 per cent.

== See also ==
- List of cities in Pakistan by population
  - List of cities in Balochistan, Pakistan by population
- Tehsils of Pakistan
  - Tehsils of Balochistan, Pakistan
- Districts of Pakistan
  - Districts of Balochistan, Pakistan
- Divisions of Pakistan
  - Divisions of Balochistan, Pakistan
