= Moola Tehsil =

Pakistani administrative area

Moola Brahui: تحصیل مولا
- Tehsil of Khuzdar District
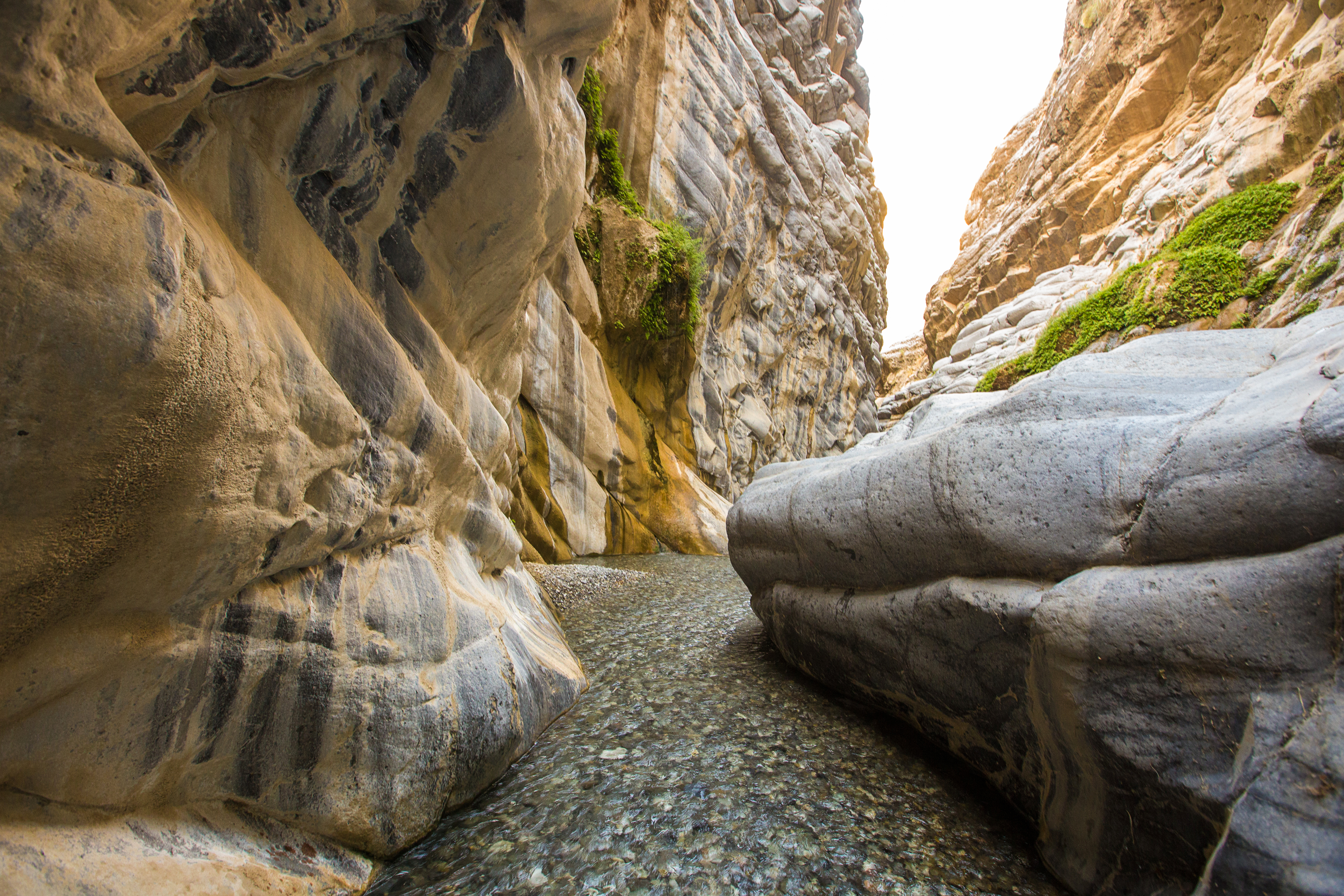
- Moola Chotuk, a remote gorge.

- Location within Balochistan, Pakistan Location within Pakistan
- Coordinates: 28°2′30″N 67°06′30″E
- Country: Pakistan
- Province: Balochistan
- District: Khuzdar District
- Tehsil: Moola

Area
  - Tehsil of Khuzdar District: 3,283 km^{2} (1,268 sq mi)
- Elevation: 783 m (2,569 ft)

Population (2023)
  - Tehsil of Khuzdar District: 32,689
  - Density: 9.96/km^{2} (25.8/sq mi)
  - Rural: 32,689

Literacy
  - Literacy rate: 52.68%
- Time zone: UTC+5 (PST)
- Main languages: 31,806 Brahui, 478 Balochi

Moola (Brahui: مولا; Balochi: مولا, pronounced [moːlaː]) is an administrative subdivision (tehsil) of Khuzdar District in Balochistan, Pakistan. It is one of ten administrative units in the district, comprising tehsils and sub-tehsils, alongside Aranji, Gresha, Karakh, Khuzdar, Nal, Ornach, Saroona, Wadh, and Zehri. Covering an area of 3,283 square kilometres, Moola is predominantly defined by mountainous and arid terrain. Geographically, it is situated 90 kilometres to the northeast of Khuzdar and stretches north of the M-8 Motorway between Khuzdar town and the neighbouring Qambar Shahdadkot District, of Sindh. Among its notable natural features is Moola Chotok, a remote gorge increasingly recognised as a destination for nature enthusiasts and adventure tourists.

== Population ==
Historical population
Year	Pop.	±% p.a.
1951	...	—
1961	...	—
1972	...	—
1981	8,794	—
1998	13,143	+2.39%
2017	23,386	+3.08%
2023	32,689	+5.74%

According to the 2023 national census, Moola Tehsil has a population of 32,689, all residing in rural areas. The tehsil comprises 4,086 households, making it the least populated and entirely rural subdivision within the district.

Despite its geographic remoteness and insufficient educational infrastructure, the tehsil records an unusually high literacy rate for a rural area, standing at 52.68%, the highest among all tehsils in Khuzdar District. This includes a male literacy rate of 59.48% and a female literacy rate of 45.32%.
