= Zehri Tehsil =

Pakistani administrative area

Zehri Brahui: تحصیل زہری
- Tehsil of Khuzdar District
- Location within Balochistan, Pakistan Location within Pakistan
- Coordinates: 28°34′15″N 66°45′08″E
- Country: Pakistan
- Province: Balochistan
- District: Khuzdar District

Area
  - Tehsil of Khuzdar District: 4,021 km^{2} (1,553 sq mi)

Population (2023)
  - Tehsil of Khuzdar District: 150,928
  - Density: 37.53/km^{2} (97.2/sq mi)
  - Urban: 70,910
  - Rural: 80,018

Literacy
  - Literacy rate: 49.38%
- Time zone: UTC+5 (PST)
- Main language: 150,317 Brahui

Zehri (Brahui: زہری; Balochi: زہری, pronounced [zəɦˈriː]) is an administrative subdivision (tehsil) of Khuzdar District in Balochistan, Pakistan. It is one of ten administrative units in the district, comprising tehsils and sub-tehsils, alongside Aranji, Gresha, Karakh, Khuzdar, Moola, Nal, Ornach, Saroona, and Wadh. Covering an area of 4,021 square kilometres, Zehri is characterised predominantly by mountainous and arid terrain.

Historical population
Year	Pop.	±% p.a.
1951	...	—
1961	...	—
1972	...	—
1981	19,143	—
1998	38,799	+4.24%
2017	101,987	+5.22%
2023	150,928	+6.75%
Pakistan Bureau of Statistics:

Its administrative centre is Zehri town, the second-largest urban settlement in Khuzdar District, located approximately 80 kilometres north of Khuzdar city and about 45 kilometres east of the N-25 National Highway, roughly two-thirds of the way between Khuzdar and Kalat. Geographically, Zehri is the northernmost tehsil of the district. It shares internal borders with Khuzdar and Moola tehsils to the south, while externally it is bordered by Kalat District to the north, Kachhi District to the northeast, and Jhal Magsi District to the east.

According to the 2023 national census, Zehri Tehsil has a total population of 150,928, with approximately 45% residing in urban areas. The tehsil comprises 19,645 households, 11,984 in rural areas and 7,661 in urban localities.

The overall literacy rate in Zehri stands at 49.38%, indicative of constrained access to educational resources. This includes a male literacy rate of 54.39% and a significantly lower female literacy rate of 43.71%, underscoring a persistent gender gap in educational attainment.
