= Şifəkəran =

- Location within Azerbaijan
- Coordinates: 38°45′N 48°37′E
- Country: Azerbaijan
- Rayon: Lerik
- Municipality: Hamarmeşə
- Time zone: UTC+4 (AZT)
  - Summer (DST): UTC+5 (AZT)

Şifəkəran is a village in the municipality of Hamarmeşə in the Lerik Rayon of Azerbaijan.
