= Mand Tehsil, Pakistan =

Pakistani town

Mand مند
- Town
- Location within Balochistan, Pakistan Location within Pakistan
- Coordinates: 26°07′08″N 62°01′44″E
- Country: Pakistan
- Province: Balochistan
- District: Tump District
- Established: N/A
- Time zone: UTC+5 (PST)
  - Summer (DST): UTC+6 (PDT)

Mand (Balochi: مند), is a town located in Tump District in southern Balochistan province of Pakistan.

On 21 April 2021, the third international border crossing point between Pakistan and Iran was inaugurated at Mand-Pishin.
