= Tump Tehsil =

Tump Tehsil is an administrative subdivision (tehsil) located in the Tump District of the Makuran Division of Balochistan province of Pakistan.

Tump Tehsil was formerly part of Kech District (also known as Turbat) of the Makuran Division of Balochistan province of Pakistan.

== Infrastructure and development challenges ==
Despite its cultural history, Tump Tehsil faces significant development hurdles due to a lack of basic infrastructure. The area experiences shortages in functional road networks, healthcare facilities, and educational institutions, which limits public access to essential services. This infrastructure deficit has stalled regional economic growth and constrained local employment opportunities. Addressing these challenges requires coordinated public and private sector interventions to establish sustainable civic and economic development.
