= Saranan =

- Town
- Location within Balochistan, Pakistan
- Coordinates: 30.545414°N 66.971092°E
- Country: Pakistan
- Province: Balochistan
- Division: Quetta
- District: Pishin
- Tehsil: Saranan Tehsil

Population (2023)
  - Total: 46,512
- Time zone: UTC+5 (PST)

Saranan is a town of Pishin District in the Balochistan province of Pakistan.

== Demographics ==
=== Population ===
Historical population
Year	Pop.	±% p.a.
2017	37,850	—
2023	46,512	+3.49%

As of the 2023 census, Saranan has population of 46,512.
