= Haran, Azerbaijan =

Haran
- Location within Azerbaijan
- Coordinates: 38°46′23″N 48°34′30″E
- Country: Azerbaijan
- Rayon: Lerik
- Municipality: Hamarmeşə
- Time zone: UTC+4 (AZT)
  - Summer (DST): UTC+5 (AZT)

Haran (also, Kharan) is a village in the Lerik Rayon of Azerbaijan. The village forms part of the municipality of Hamarmeşə.
