= Tump District =

Tump District ضلع تمپ
- District of Balochistan
- Country: Pakistan
- Province: Balochistan
- Division: Makran
- Established: 24 February 2026 notified
- Founder: Balochistan Government
- Headquarters: Tump

Government
  - Type: District Administration
  - Deputy commissioner: Dr Barkat Ail Baloch
  - District Police Officer: Mohammad arif Baloch
  - District Health Officer: Dr. Noroz Yaqoob

Area
  - Total: 3,401 km^{2} (1,313 sq mi)
- Time zone: PST
- Number of Tehsils: 2

Tump is an administrative district located in the Makuran Division in the south west of Balochistan province of Pakistan. Its tehsil are Tump Tehsil, Mand Tehsil and Zamoran Tehsil.

== History ==
The district was carved out of Kech District in March 2026. The district headquarters is at Tump city. Tump, previously was part of the Turbat/Kech District.

== Administration ==
The district of Kech is administratively subdivided into the following tehsils, each of which contains several villages:

Tehsil	Area (km^{2})	Pop. (2023)	Density (ppl/km^{2}) (2023)	Literacy rate (2023)	Union Councils
Tump Tehsil					...
Mand Tehsil					...
Zamoran Tehsil					...
