= Tump, Balochistan =

Tump
- City
- Location within Balochistan, Pakistan
- Coordinates: 26.096935°N 62.365363°E
- Country: Pakistan
- Province: Balochistan
- Division: Makran
- District: Tump District

Population (2023)
  - Total: 49,269
- Time zone: UTC+5 (PST)

Tump is a city in Tump Tehsil in the District Tump of Balochistan province of Pakistan. It is located near the Iranian border with Pakistan.

== Demographics ==
=== Population ===
Historical population
Year	Pop.	±% p.a.
1951	...	—
1961	...	—
1972	...	—
1981	...	—
1998	...	—
2017	48,766	—
2023	49,269	+0.17%

The population of Tump city in 2017 was 750,45 but according to the 2024 Census of Pakistan, the population has risen to 111,209. The population of Tump tehsil was 147,241 (2024).

Census	Population (Tump city)	Population (Tump tehsil)
1998	...	51,234
2017	48,766	146,008
2024	49,269	147,0241

=== Languages ===
More than 99% of the population speak the Baloch language as the mother tongue.
