= Ornach Tehsil =

Pakistani administrative area

Ornach اورناچ
- Tehsil of Khuzdar District
- Location within Balochistan, Pakistan Location within Pakistan
- Coordinates: 27°58′N 66°07′E
- Country: Pakistan
- Province: Balochistan
- District: Khuzdar District
- Tehsil: Ornach

Area
  - Tehsil of Khuzdar District: 3,368 km^{2} (1,300 sq mi)

Population (2023)
  - Tehsil of Khuzdar District: 41,811
  - Density: 12.41/km^{2} (32.1/sq mi)
  - Urban: -
  - Rural: 41,811

Literacy
  - Literacy rate: 21.58%
- Time zone: UTC+5 (PST)
- Main language: 33,910 Balochi, 7,850 Brahui

Ornach, also spelled Urnach (Balochi: اورناچ) is an administrative subdivision (Tehsil) of Khuzdar District in Balochistan, Pakistan. It is one of ten administrative units, comprising tehsils and sub-tehsils, in the district, alongside Aranji, Gresha, Karakh, Khuzdar, Moola, Nal, Saroona, Wadh, and Zehri. The tehsil spans an area of 3,368 square kilometres.

Geographically, Ornach Tehsil comprises much of the territory west of the N-25 National Highway, between the towns of Bela and Wadh.

== Population ==
Historical population
| Year | Pop. | ±% p.a. |
|---|---|---|
| 1951 | ... | — |
| 1961 | ... | — |
| 1972 | ... | — |
| 1981 | 20,772 | — |
| 1998 | 20,907 | +0.04% |
| 2017 | 37,588 | +3.14% |
| 2023 | 41,811 | +1.79% |
Source: Pakistan Bureau of Statistics:

According to the 2023 census, the tehsil has a total population of 41,811, all of whom reside in rural areas, making it one of the more sparsely populated parts of the district. The overall literacy rate stands at 21.58%, with a male literacy rate of 27.00% and a significantly lower female literacy rate of 15.09%.

In recent years, Ornach has increasingly been the scene of clashes and violence between the law enforcement agencies and armed insurgents.
