= Karakh Tehsil =

Pakistani administrative area

Karakh Balochi: تحصیل کارخ Karkh
- Tehsil of Khuzdar District
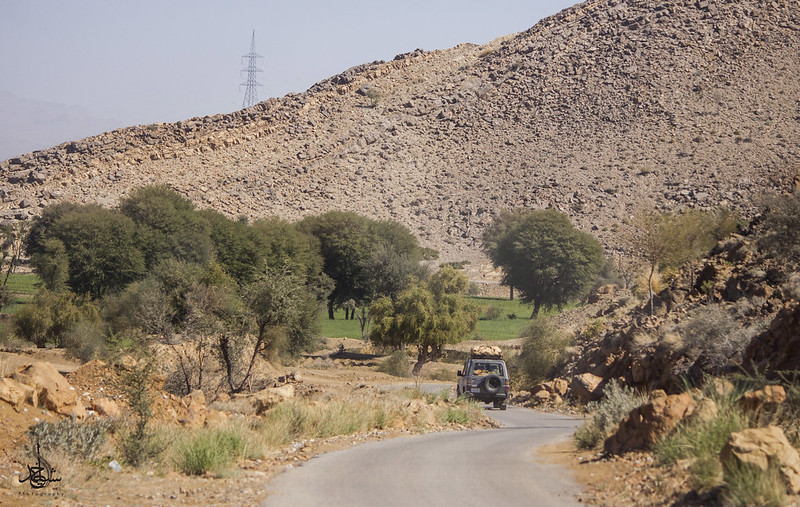
- Impressions of Karakh

- Location within Balochistan, Pakistan Location within Pakistan
- Coordinates: 27°44′N 67°10′E
- Country: Pakistan
- Province: Balochistan
- District: Khuzdar District
- Tehsil: Karakh

Area
  - Tehsil of Khuzdar District: 1,352 km^{2} (522 sq mi)
- Elevation: 794 m (2,605 ft)

Population (2023)
  - Tehsil of Khuzdar District: 35,990
  - Density: 26.62/km^{2} (68.9/sq mi)
  - Rural: 35,990

Literacy
  - Literacy rate: Total: (32.14%); Male: (39.70%); Female: (24.41%)
- Time zone: UTC+5 (PST)
- Main language: 24,489 Brahui, 7,070 Sindhi, 4,255 Balochi

Karakh or locally also spelled Karkh (Note: Brahui: کارخ; Balochi: کارخ, pronounced [kə.rəx]) is an administrative subdivision (tehsil) of Khuzdar District in Balochistan, Pakistan. It is one of ten administrative units in the district, comprising tehsils and sub-tehsils, alongside Aranji, Gresha, Khuzdar, Nal, Moola, Ornach, Saroona, Wadh, and Zehri.

== Geography ==
Karakh Tehsil, is predominantly defined by mountainous and arid terrain, covers an area of approximately 1,352 square kilometres (135,200 ha). It is located southeast of Moola Tehsil, east and northeast of Khuzdar Tehsil, and borders Jhal Magsi District to the west and Qambar Shahdadkot District in Sindh to the east.

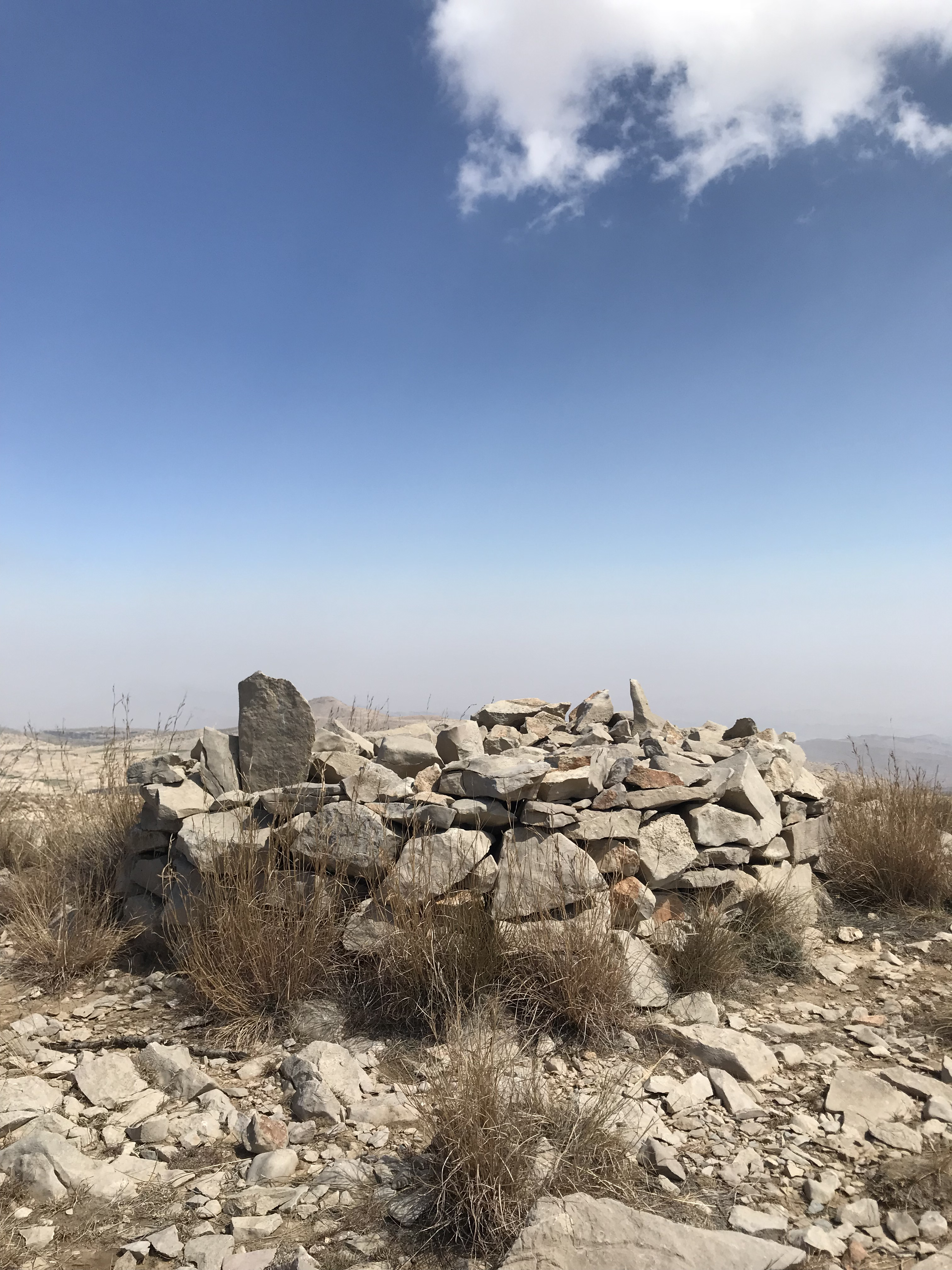
Kuttay Ji Qabar on top of the second-highest peak of the Kirthar Mountains

Among its notable natural landmarks is the second-highest peak of the Central Brahui Range, part of the Kirthar Mountains, rising to an elevation of 2,096 metres. This peak is situated in Mouza Dhadaro, within Union Council Sunchuko, and is locally known as Kuttay Ji Qabar ("Dog's Grave" in Urdu) and Kuchak na Qabar in Brahui. The site holds cultural significance due to its association with a prominent Brahui folktale. Located approximately 25 kilometres from the Sindh-Balochistan boundary, the area is subject to a jurisdictional dispute between the provincial governments of Sindh and Balochistan, primarily due to its perceived value as a protected heritage and tourism site.

== Population ==
Historical population
Year	Pop.	±% p.a.
1972	...	—
1981	17,837	—
1998	21,984	+1.24%
2017	31,016	+1.83%
2023	35,990	+2.51%
Source: Pakistan Bureau of Statistics

According to the 2023 national census, Karakh tehsil has a total population of 35,990, all residing in rural areas. The tehsil encompasses 6,723 households, reflecting its predominantly rural character.

The literacy rate in the tehsil stands at 32.14%, reflecting limited access to educational resources. This figure includes a male literacy rate of 39.70% and a significantly lower female literacy rate of 24.41%, highlighting a notable gender disparity in educational attainment.

== Languages ==
Languages of Karakh tehsil (2023)
1. Brahui (68.1%)
2. Sindhi (19.6%)
3. Balochi (11.8%)
4. Others (0.44%)

In Karakh Tehsil, Brahui is the predominant language, spoken by approximately 24,489 (~68.08%) people, followed by Sindhi, spoken by around 7,070 (~19.65%) individuals, and 4,255 (~11.83%) Balochi speakers. The dominance of Brahui reflects the tehsil's historical roots as part of the central Brahui-speaking highlands of Balochistan, where tribal and cultural affiliations have preserved the language over centuries. Balochi, while present, plays a thirdly role in local communication, often coexisting with Brahui in multilingual households and public life. The Sindhi spoken in the region is largely the distinct Lasi dialect of Sindhi.
