= Khuzdar Tehsil =

Pakistani administrative area

Khuzdar Brahui: تحصیل خضدار
- Tehsil of Khuzdar District
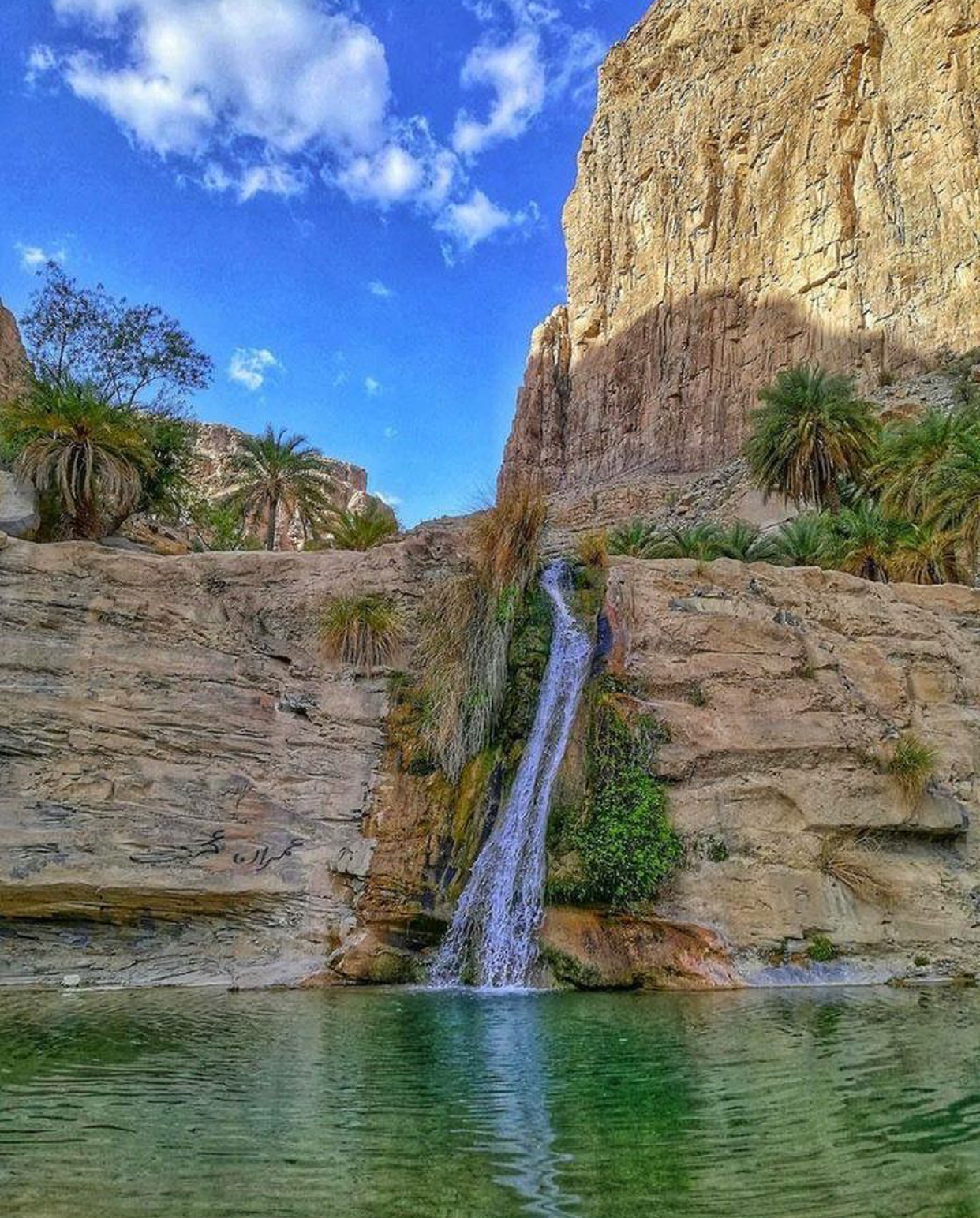
- Charoo Waterfall

- Location within Balochistan, Pakistan Location within Pakistan
- Coordinates: 27°50′N 66°38′E
- Country: Pakistan
- Province: Balochistan
- District: Khuzdar District
- Tehsil: Khuzdar

Area
  - Tehsil of Khuzdar District: 6,112 km^{2} (2,360 sq mi)

Population (2023)
  - Tehsil of Khuzdar District: 359,358
  - Density: 58.8/km^{2} (152/sq mi)
  - Urban: 218,112
  - Rural: 141,246

Literacy
  - Literacy rate: 38.59%
- Time zone: UTC+5 (PST)
- Main languages: 342,974 Brahui, 6,044 Pashto, 5,652 Balochi

Khuzdar (Balochi: قصدار; Urdu: خضدار, pronounced ['xʊzd̪ɑːɾ]) is an administrative subdivision (tehsil) of Khuzdar District in Balochistan, Pakistan. It is one of ten administrative units, comprising tehsils and sub-tehsils, in the district, alongside Aranji, Gresha, Karakh, Moola, Nal, Ornach, Saroona, Wadh, and Zehri. The tehsil covers an area of 6,112 square kilometres, characterised predominantly by mountainous terrain. It is centred around the city of Khuzdar, which serves as the district headquarters, and extends southeastward toward the border with Sindh.

== Population ==
Historical population
Year	Pop.	±% p.a.
1951	...	—
1961	52,062	—
1972	106,981	+6.77%
1981	84,115	−2.64%
1998	161,845	+3.92%
2017	299,464	+3.29%
2023	359,358	+3.09%
Pakistan Bureau of Statistics:

According to the 2023 national census, Khuzdar tehsil has a population of 359,358. Of this approximately 60%, or 218,112 individuals, reside in urban areas, primarily in Khuzdar city, while 141,246 live in rural parts of the tehsil. This makes it the most urbanised tehsil in the district.

The overall literacy rate stands at 43.85%, with approximately half of the male population (50.40%) being literate, while the female literacy rate is significantly lower at 36.48%.

Access to safe drinking water is a major issue in the tehsil. Community involvement, especially by women, who are the primary collectors of water, is crucial, particularly in addressing sanitation challenges.
