= Nal Tehsil =

Tehsil of Khuzdar District, Balochistan, Pakistan

Nal نال / نال
- Tehsil of Khuzdar District
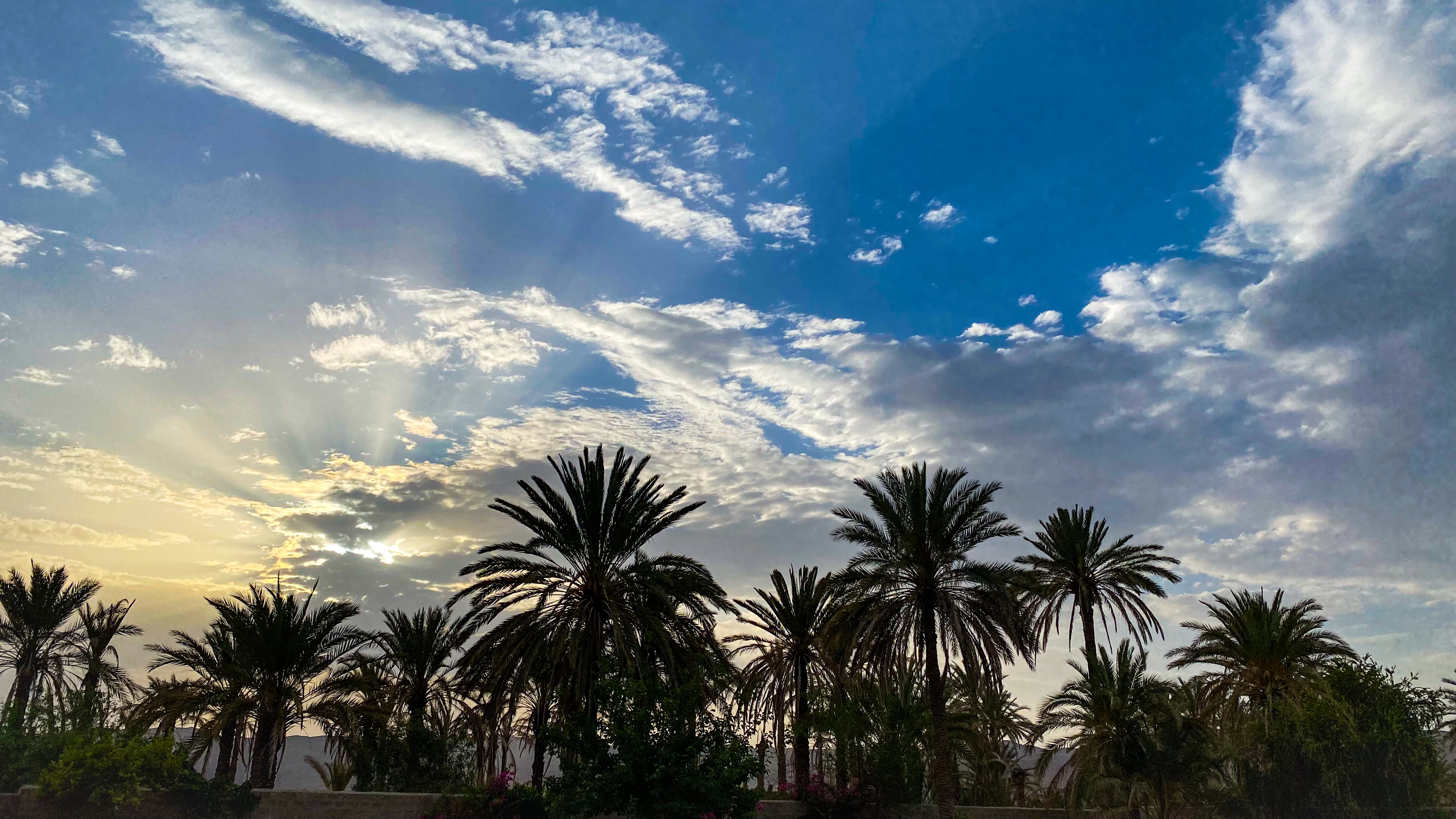
- Evening view of date palm trees in Nal, Balochistan

- Location within Balochistan, Pakistan Location within Pakistan
- Coordinates: 27°41′N 66°11′E
- Country: Pakistan
- Province: Balochistan
- District: Khuzdar District
- Headquarters: Nal

Area
  - Tehsil of Khuzdar District: 1,791 km^{2} (692 sq mi)
- Elevation: 1,178 m (3,865 ft)

Population (2023)
  - Tehsil of Khuzdar District: 103,631
  - Density: 57.86/km^{2} (149.9/sq mi)
  - Urban: 48,481 (46.78%)
  - Rural: 55,150 (53.22%)

Literacy
  - Literacy rate: 47.26%
- Time zone: UTC+5 (PST)
- Area code: +92848
- Main languages: Balochi (87,685), Brahui (15,560)

Nal, also spelled Naal (Brahui: نال; Balochi: نال, pronounced [nɑːl]) is a tehsil of Khuzdar District in Balochistan, Pakistan. The tehsil covers an area of 1,791 square kilometres and comprises mountainous and arid terrain at an elevation of 1,178 metres. It is one of ten administrative subdivisions of Khuzdar District, alongside Aranji, Gresha, Karakh, Khuzdar, Moola, Ornach, Saroona, Wadh, and Zehri. The tehsil headquarters is the town of Nal. According to the 2023 national census, the tehsil has a population of 103,631.

The area around Nal town is of archaeological significance. The nearby site of Sohr Damb (also known as Red Mound) is associated with the Amri-Nal culture, which flourished between approximately 3800 and 2300 BCE, and has been the subject of multiple excavation campaigns.

== Geography ==
Nal Tehsil is located east of Khuzdar Tehsil, northeast of Wadh Tehsil, and bordered by Gresha Tehsil to the west and Ornach Tehsil to the south. It also shares boundaries with Surab District to the south and Kalat District to the north. The Nal and Kalachi rivers are the main waterways within the tehsil area.

== History ==
The area now comprising Nal Tehsil formed part of the historic district of Khuzdar, which was separated from Kalat District and established as an independent district on 1 March 1974.

The archaeological site of Sohr Damb, situated near Nal town, dates to between 3800 and 2000 BCE and is associated with the Amri-Nal culture, one of the pre-Indus Valley civilisations of the region. Excavations were conducted at the site by Harold Hargreaves in 1924 and in subsequent campaigns.

== Climate ==
Nal Tehsil has an arid climate characterised by two distinct seasons. Summers are hot and dry, with temperatures reaching approximately 40°C. Winters are milder but can be cold owing to the area's elevation, with nighttime temperatures sometimes falling below freezing. Precipitation is low throughout the year.

== Demographics ==
=== Population ===
Historical population
| Year | Pop. | ±% p.a. |
|---|---|---|
| 1981 | 60,458 | — |
| 1998 | 80,221 | +1.68% |
| 2017 | 85,249 | +0.32% |
| 2023 | 103,631 | +3.31% |
Sources: Pakistan Bureau of Statistics

According to the 2023 national census, Nal Tehsil has a total population of 103,631, of whom 55,150 are rural residents and 48,481 are urban residents. The urban population is concentrated primarily in the town of Nal, which serves as the tehsil headquarters. The tehsil encompasses 15,283 households in total, with 9,116 in rural areas and 6,167 in urban areas.

=== Languages ===
According to the 2023 census, Balochi is the first language of 87,685 residents and Brahui of 15,560 residents, making Nal Tehsil one of the Balochi-majority tehsils within Khuzdar District.

=== Economy ===
The principal economic activities in the tehsil are livestock rearing, agriculture, and mining. Agricultural produce includes dates, fruits, and vegetables. The district of Khuzdar is rich in mineral resources including barite, chromite, granite, marble, and iron ore.

== Education ==
The literacy rate in Nal Tehsil stands at 47.26% based on the 2023 census, comprising a male literacy rate of 53.94% and a female literacy rate of 39.73%.
