= Wadh =

Pakistani town

Wadh Brahui: وڈھ
- Town
- Location within Balochistan, Pakistan Location within Pakistan
- Coordinates: 27°21′N 66°22′E
- Country: Pakistan
- Province: Balochistan
- District: Khuzdar District
- Tehsil: Wadh Tehsil

Population (2023)
  - Town: 26,875
- Time zone: UTC+5 (PKT)

Wadh (Urdu: وڈھ) is the fourth largest urban centre in Khuzdar District, in the province of Balochistan, Pakistan, with a population of 26,875. It serves as the administrative centre of Wadh Tehsil.

The local economy is primarily based on agriculture and mineral extraction, with farming and mining serving as the main sources of livelihood for residents.

== Demographics ==
Historical population
Year	Pop.	±% p.a.
1951	...	—
1961	...	—
1972	...	—
1981	...	—
1998	13,794	—
2017	22,209	+2.54%
2023	26,875	+3.23%

According to the 2023 Pakistan census, Wadh had a population of 26,875.

== Education ==
Wadh is home to several educational institutions serving the town and tehsil. The Government Boys High School and Government College Wadh have been established by the Government of Balochistan to provide secondary and tertiary education. Additionally, the Lasbela University of Agriculture, Water and Marine Sciences operates a campus in Wadh, offering higher education in agricultural and environmental sciences. The Wadh Student Library serves as a local educational resource and study space for students in the region.

== Health ==
The Civil Hospital Wadh Town is the main healthcare facility for both residents of the town and the wider Wadh Tehsil, offering basic medical services.

== History ==
Wadh and its surrounding mountainous region in Khuzdar have a long and turbulent history, extending from prehistoric times to the present day. Archaeological remains, including ancient sites and cave paintings, attest to early human settlement in the area. Among the most notable are the Tharia Cave Paintings, located near the Pallimas Valley, which offer insight into the prehistoric cultures that once inhabited the region.

The area is predominantly inhabited by the Mengal and Sasoli tribes, who speak Brahui, a Dravidian language that sets them apart linguistically from their neighbours, who mostly speak Iranian languages. Despite successive waves of rule by the Arab empire, Persian and Indian dynasties, Afghanistan, and eventually British colonial authorities from 1839, the Brahui-speaking communities have maintained a distinct cultural identity. Following the end of British colonial rule, it became part of Pakistan in 1948.
