= Khuzdar =

City in Balochistan, Pakistan

Khuzdar Urdu: خضدار
- City
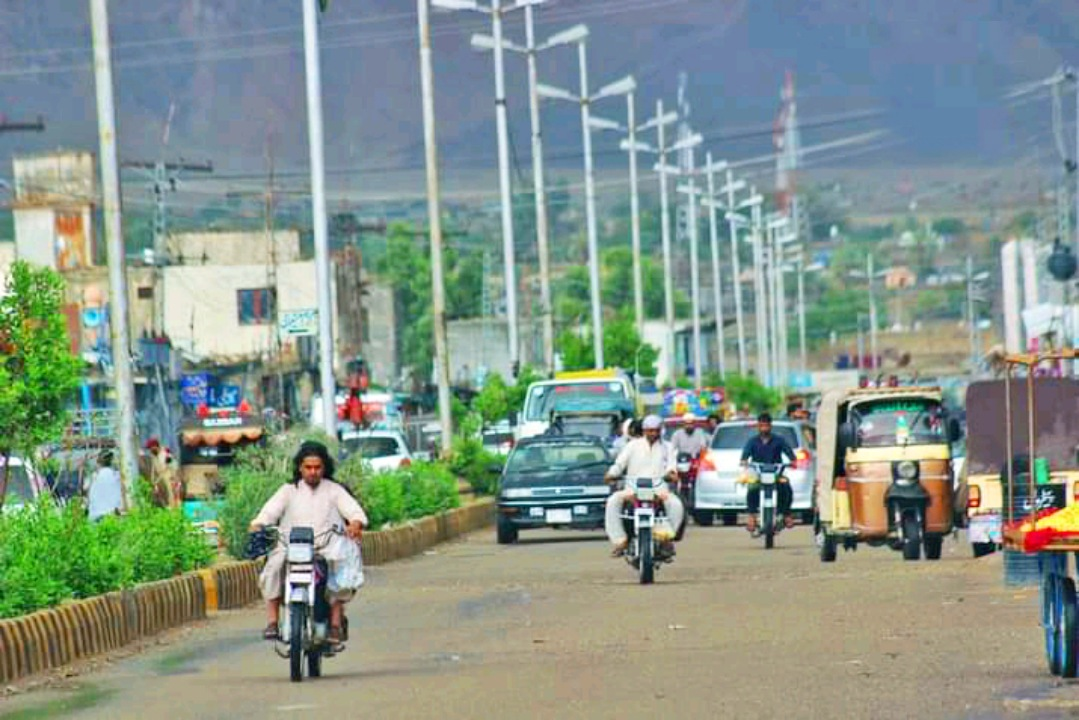
- Street scene in Khuzdar

- Location of Khuzdar Khuzdar (Pakistan)
- Coordinates: 27°48′N 66°37′E
- Country: Pakistan
- Province: Balochistan
- District: Khuzdar

Government
  - Type: Municipal Corporation
  - Mayor: Seat Vacant
- Elevation: 1,237 m (4,058 ft)

Population (2023)
  - City: 218,112
  - Rank: 49th in Pakistan; 3rd in Balochistan
- Time zone: UTC+5 (PST)
- Postal code: 89100
- Calling code: 848

Khuzdar ( Balochi: هزدار, Brahui: خضدار, pronounced ['xʊzd̪ɑːɾ]) also known as Hozdar, is a city and the administrative headquarters of Khuzdar District in Balochistan province of Pakistan. Khuzdar is surrounded by the mountainous region of the southwestern portion of the country near central Balochistan. In terms of population, it is the 3rd-largest city in the province and 49th-largest in the country. As of the 2023 Pakistani census, the estimated population of the city is 228,112.

Historically, Khuzdar was the main city and capital of the Jhalawan province of the Khanate of Kalat. From October 1952 to 1955, it was a part of the Balochistan States Union. In 1955, Khuzdar became the capital of the newly formed Kalat Division before it became a district of its own in 1974. Gresha, a tehsil of Khuzdar District, is almost 80 km (50 mi) from Khuzdar city. As of 2023, it is the largest Brahui-speaking city.

== Etymology ==
The name for the city was originally in the Middle Persian language, deriving from the Middle Persian word for silk - "qaz", and "dar" which originates from Arabic meaning "house of" or "seat of" - "Qazdar", meaning "place of silk". After the Islamic conquest of Sindh (which included Khuzdar at the time) that solidified the leadership of the area under the Muslims, the name of the city was changed to "Khuzdar". "Khuz" means to "take firmly" or "retain forever" in Arabic.

== History ==
Under the rule of the Umayyad caliphate, the city was the capital of the Turan province, which was retained administratively from the Sasanian Empire.

Under Abbasid rule a route from Iran through north-west Balochistan connected Qandabil, Kalat, Khuzdar, and Multan. A caravan route connected Khuzdar with Sehwan. After the decline of Arab rule, Sabuktigin, the founder of the Ghaznavid dynasty, conquered Khuzdar.

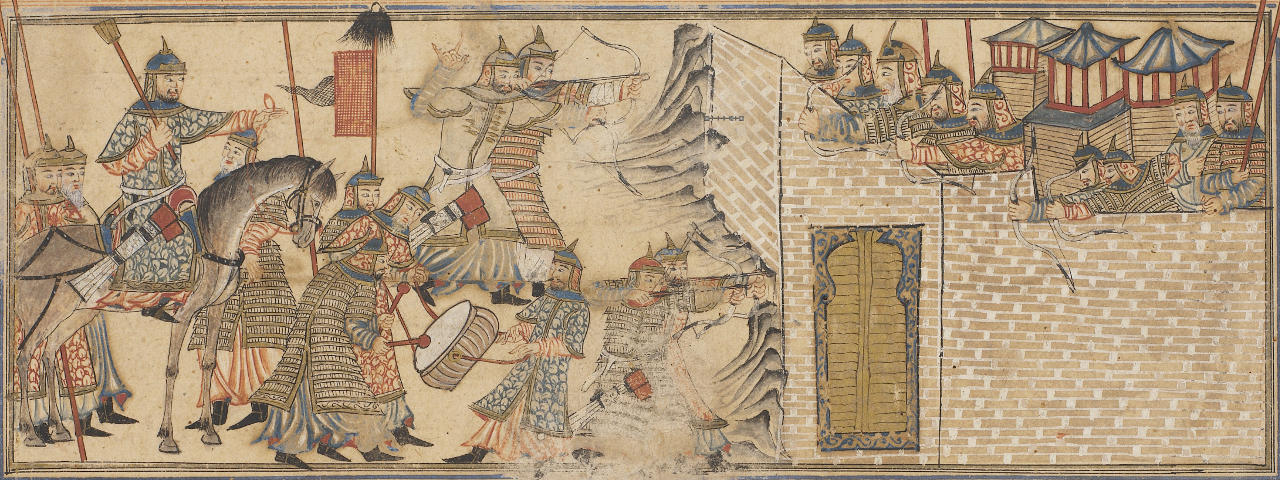
Mahmud ibn Sebuktegin, Ghaznavid ruler, conquering Qasdar (modern Khuzdar). Jamiʿ al-Tawarikh

Khuzdar became the capital of the Brahui kingdom of Makran.

In the early 17th century, it was part of the Jhalawan Kingdom, but it soon fell under the Khanate of Kalat, where it remained until a series of revolts during the reign of Khudadad Khan (1857–1893). By 1896, after Khudadad's death, the authority of Kalat was restored.

Under a treaty with Kalat, the British appointed a political agent at Khuzdar in 1903. British assistance continued until 1947, after which the area was acceded to Pakistan and became a democracy. When the Balochistan States Union became Kalat Division, Khuzdar was established as the divisional headquarters. The divisional administration of Pakistan ended in 2000. Khuzdar was again established as the divisional headquarters in 2009, by the Pakistan People's Party government.

== Demographics ==
Population

Historical population

Year	Pop.	±% p.a.
1972	3,362	—
1981	30,887	+27.94%
1998	91,057	+6.57%

Year	Pop.	±% p.a.
2017	182,927	+3.74%
2023	218,112	+2.98%

According to the 2023 census Khuzdar city has a population of 218,112.

Languages

Languages of Khuzdar (2023 Census)
1. Brahui (93.0%)
2. Pashto (2.71%)
3. Balochi (2.39%)
4. Sindhi (1.33%)
5. Urdu (0.44%)
6. Others (0.13%)

== Geography and climate ==
Khuzdar is at the apex of a narrow valley at an elevation of 1,237 metres (4,058 ft). Despite this altitude, Khuzdar like most of Balochistan has a semi arid climate (Köppen BSh) with very low and erratic rainfall. Unlike most parts of the province, the heaviest average rainfall comes from the Asian monsoon in July and August, though this rainfall tends to be very erratic and in many summers there is no significant rain at all.

Climate data for Khuzdar (1991-2020)
Month	Jan	Feb	Mar	Apr	May	Jun	Jul	Aug	Sep	Oct	Nov	Dec	Year
Record high °C (°F)	27.1 (80.8)	28.4 (83.1)	33.0 (91.4)	39.0 (102.2)	41.7 (107.1)	43.0 (109.4)	43.0 (109.4)	42.0 (107.6)	40.2 (104.4)	38.0 (100.4)	31.2 (88.2)	28.0 (82.4)	43.0 (109.4)
Mean daily maximum °C (°F)	17.8 (64.0)	20.1 (68.2)	24.7 (76.5)	30.5 (86.9)	35.6 (96.1)	38.2 (100.8)	37.4 (99.3)	36.0 (96.8)	34.4 (93.9)	30.4 (86.7)	25.0 (77.0)	20.6 (69.1)	29.2 (84.6)
Daily mean °C (°F)	10.9 (51.6)	13.2 (55.8)	18.1 (64.6)	23.8 (74.8)	28.7 (83.7)	31.4 (88.5)	30.8 (87.4)	30.8 (87.4)	27.2 (81.0)	22.8 (73.0)	17.1 (62.8)	12.9 (55.2)	22.3 (72.1)
Mean daily minimum °C (°F)	3.9 (39.0)	6.2 (43.2)	11.4 (52.5)	17.1 (62.8)	22.2 (72.0)	24.7 (76.5)	24.4 (75.9)	23.3 (73.9)	20.9 (69.6)	15.3 (59.5)	9.4 (48.9)	5.0 (41.0)	15.3 (59.5)
Record low °C (°F)	−8 (18)	−4.1 (24.6)	0.6 (33.1)	8.6 (47.5)	11.0 (51.8)	16.0 (60.8)	17.0 (62.6)	15.0 (59.0)	12.8 (55.0)	5.0 (41.0)	1.0 (33.8)	−6.1 (21.0)	−8 (18)
Average precipitation mm (inches)	19.3 (0.76)	30.0 (1.18)	28.0 (1.10)	18.5 (0.73)	22.3 (0.88)	25.5 (1.00)	54.6 (2.15)	50.0 (1.97)	12.3 (0.48)	6.3 (0.25)	4.6 (0.18)	14.3 (0.56)	285.7 (11.25)
Average precipitation days (≥ 1.0 mm)	2.1	2.8	3.2	2.3	1.7	1.8	5.2	4.3	1.3	0.6	0.6	1.6	27.5
Average relative humidity (%)	44	39	36	27	23	25	42	46	32	26	31	41	34
Source: NOAA (extremes 1971–1990), Deutscher Wetterdienst (humidity 1979-1995), Ogimet

== Education ==
The city has a number of government and private colleges, including the following:

- Balochistan Residential College
- Balochistan University of Engineering and Technology
- Boys Degree College, Khuzdar
- Al Farooq Residential School, Khuzdar
- Divisional Public School and College, Khuzdar
- Girls Degree College, Khuzdar
- Government College of Elementary Education (Women), Khuzdar
- Hamdam College of Education, Khuzdar
- Jhalawan Law College
- Jhalawan Medical College
- Lasbela University of Agriculture, Water and Marine Science, Khuzdar campus
- Pakistan Public School, Khuzdar
- Sardar Bahadur Khan Women's University, Khuzdar sub-campus
- Shaheed Sikander Zarakzai University, Khuzdar
- Sunrise Public School and College, Khuzdar
- Workers Model Higher Secondary School
