= Khuzdar District =

District in Balochistan, Pakistan

Coordinates: 27°10′N 66°20′E

Khuzdar District ضلع خضدار هزدارءِ دمگ
- District of Balochistan
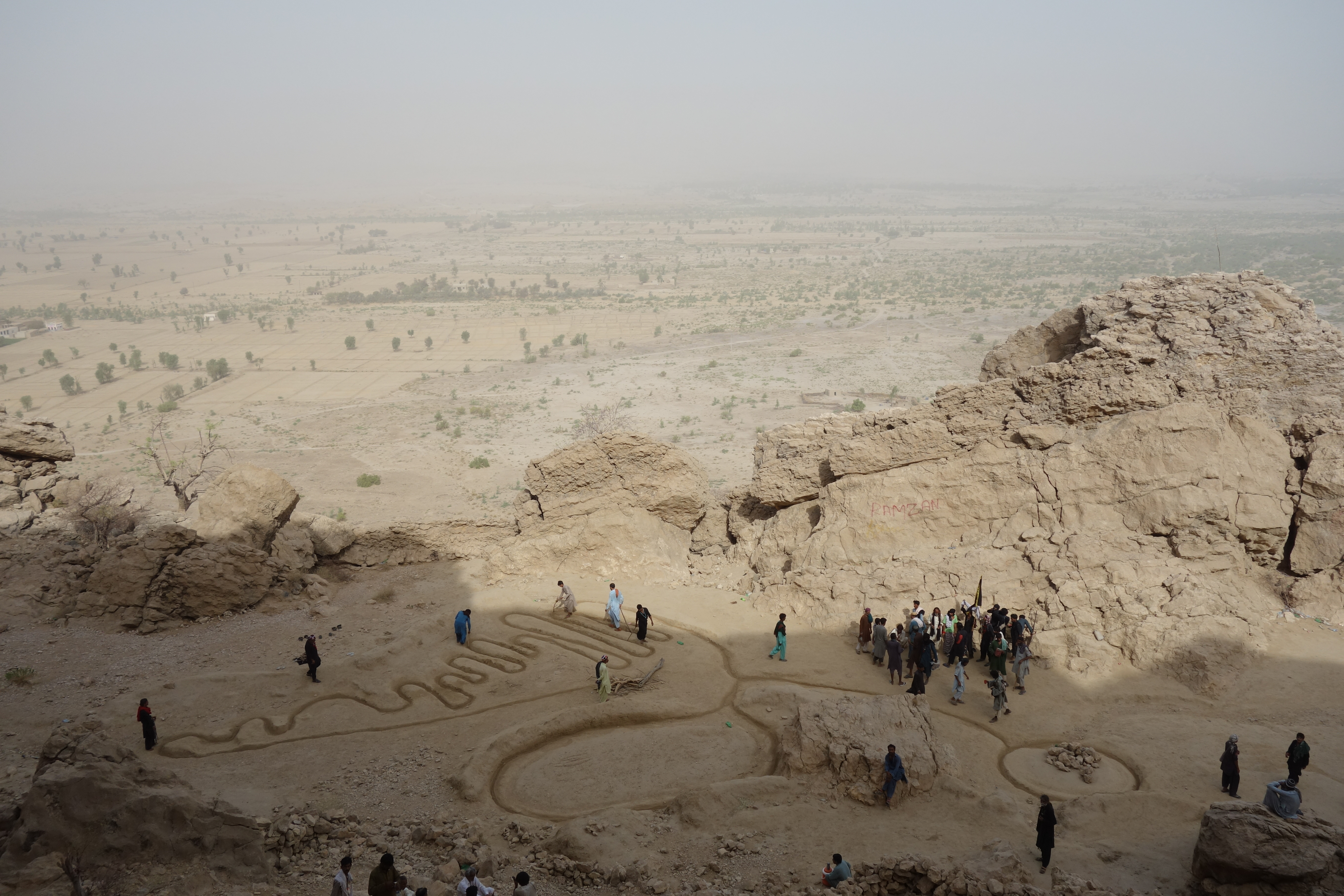
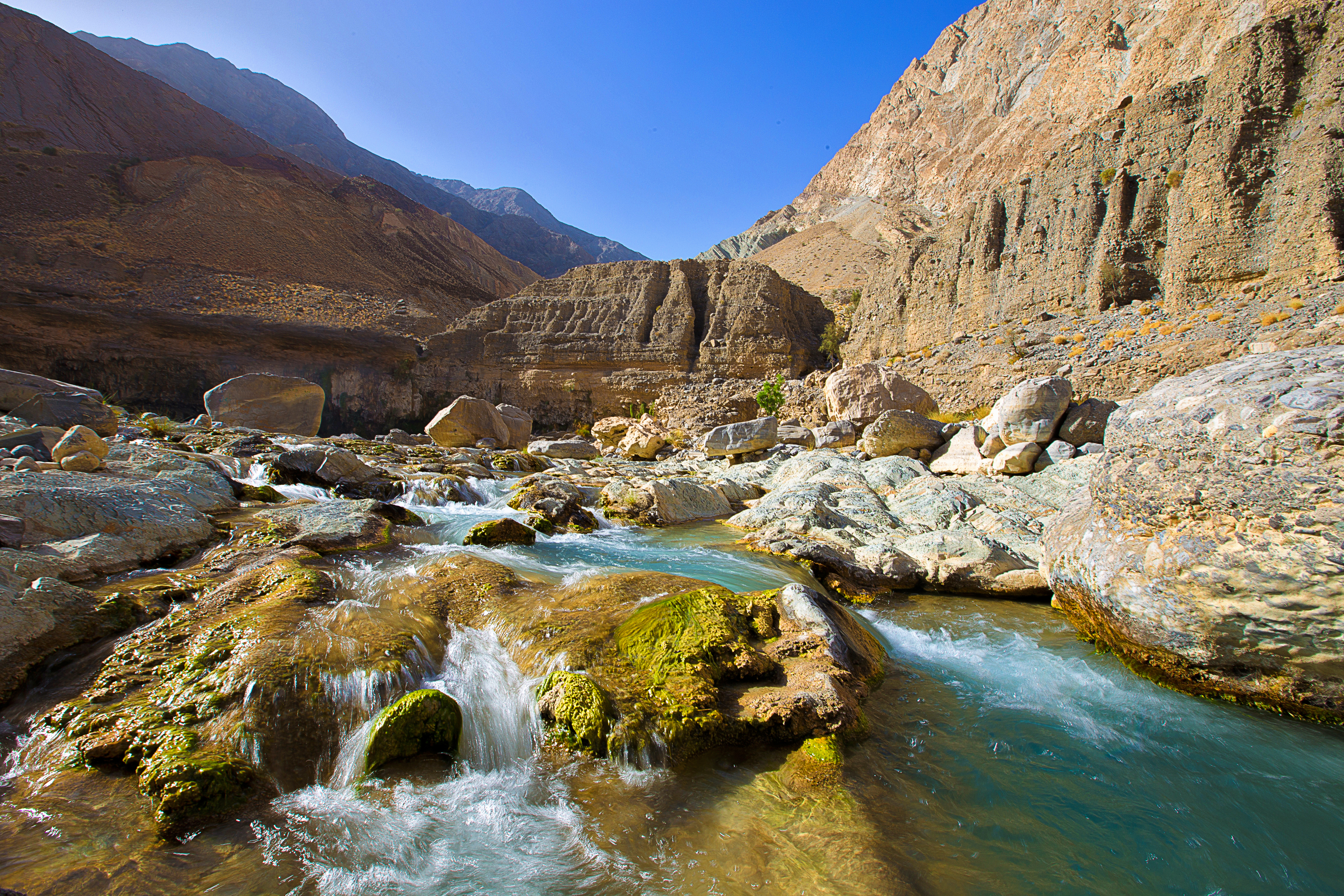
- Top: Cave of Lahoot Lamakan; Bottom: Moola Chotok

- Map of Balochistan with Khuzdar District highlighted
- Country: Pakistan
- Province: Balochistan
- Division: Khuzdar
- Established: 1974
- Headquarters: Khuzdar

Government
  - Type: District Administration
  - Deputy Commissioner: N/A
  - District Police Officer: Mohammad Zafar Ali
  - District Health Officer: N/A

Area
  - District of Balochistan: 10,747 km^{2} (4,149 sq mi)

Population (2023)
  - District of Balochistan: 428,037
  - Density: 28.2/km^{2} (73/sq mi)
  - Urban: 364,378 (36.54%)
  - Rural: 632,836 (63.46%)

Languages
  - Main language(s): Brahui language, Balochi, Urdu & English

Literacy
  - Literacy rate: Total: (38.59%); Male: (44.91%); Female: (31.42%)
- Time zone: UTC+5 (PST)
- Number of Tehsils: 4

Khuzdar (Balochi: هزدارء‍ِ دمگ; Urdu and Brahui: ضلع خضدار) is a district in the Balochistan province of Pakistan. The city of Khuzdar serves as the district's headquarters.

Until its establishment as a district in 1974 it was part of Kalat District. In November 1992 part of the territory of Khuzdar was split off to form the new district of Awaran.

In May 2026, The Balochistan provincial cabinet approved a major administrative restructuring, bifurcation of Khuzdar district. Wadh has been upgraded to its own distinct district with Ornach and Nal sub-divisions, while Zehri and Saroona has been detached and merged into the neighboring districts. Zehri in Surab and Saroona in Labsbela.

== Overview ==
Towns and cities in Balochistan are not as big as compared to other provinces generally due to scarcity of water and abundance of arid and wastelands. Khuzdar, though one of the important cities of Balochistan is a small sized city located in Khuzdar District in Balochistan, Pakistan. The city of Khuzdar is situated on National Highway linking Pakistan, Iran and Turkey. It is about 400 km from Karachi and 300 km from Quetta, both of them being major cities in the country.

During the period of Arab rule, this region formed the province of Turan, with Khuzdar as the capital. It was an important cantonment and was the headquarters of the Arab General Commanding the Indian frontier. Later Khuzdar became a part of the Kalat State. It was the scene of a battle between the people of Jhalawan and the Khan of Kalat in 1869. The Khan of Kalat Mir Khuda Khan was victorious and built a fort of painted pottery here. Close to the town are the ruins of an old fort built by the Arabs. Khuzdar is the capital of Khuzdar district. It is a district and divisional headquarters town in Balochistan. Previously part of the Kalat district, Khuzdar was upgraded as a separate district on 1 March 1974. The district is subdivided into four tehsils: Khuzdar, Zehri, Naal and Wadh. It is at the apex of a narrow valley at an elevation of 1,237 m (4.000 feet). Over 99% of the people of the area are Muslims. The population of Khuzdar district is estimated to be over 525,000 in 2005. The major tribes in the district are Gongav, Bizenjo, Mardoi Jattak, Hasni, Siapad, Nausherwani, Sajidi, Zehri, Mengal, Zarakzai, Ahmadzai' Rekizai ' Sasoli ' Kurd' Rind, Lund, Alkhani, Buzdar, Rustamani, Kaloi, and Jamali.

A large military complex is near completion near Khuzdar, which would make it the second largest Cantonment in Balochistan after Quetta.

A university is at the outskirts of Khuzdar, known as the heart of Balochistan. The city of Khuzdar is situated on National Highway linking Pakistan, Iran and Turkey. The city has an airport near the university. The former college, now university is constructed on the foot-hills and is spread over an area of 200 acres (0.81 km^{2}).

== Administration ==
The district is administratively subdivided into following tehsils and sub-tehsils, which include 34 union councils:

Tehsil	Area (km²)	Pop. (2023)	Density (ppl/km²) (2023)	Literacy rate (2023)	Union Councils (2005)
Khuzdar Tehsil	6,112	359,358	58.80	43.85%	Baghbana, Balina Khattan, Faizabad, Ferozabad, Gazgi, Khand, Parko, Sasol, Tootak, Zeedi, Zerina Khattan
Nal Tehsil	1,791	103,631	57.86	47.26%	Durnaili, Goni Gresha, Hazar Ganji, Killi Alam Khan, Kocho, Naal, Ornach, Sar Raij
Wadh Tehsil	2,118	116,229	54.88	31.83%	Arenji, Badari, Loop, Pesi Kapper, Saroona, Shah Noorani, Wadh, Waheer
Zehri Tehsil	4,021	150,928	37.53	49.38%	Chashma, Ghat, Noorgama Zehri
Baghbana Tehsil	...	...	...	...	
Aranji Tehsil	7,456	50,533	6.78	12.11%	
Gresha Tehsil	2,622	69,665	26.57	22.10%	
Karakh Tehsil	1,352	35,990	26.62	32.14%	
Moola Tehsil	3,283	32,689	9.96	52.68%	Abad Karkh, Moola, Sun Chakoo, Kharzan
Ornach Tehsil	3,368	41,811	12.41	21.58%	
Saroona Tehsil	3,257	36,380	11.17	24.22%	

== Demographics ==
Historical population
Year	Pop.	±% p.a.
1951	N/A	—
1961	N/A	—
1972	N/A	—
1981	N/A	—
1998	417,466	—
2017	798,896	+3.47%
2023	997,214	+3.76%

=== Population ===
As of the 2023 census, Khuzdar district has 161,450 households and a population of 997,214. The district has a sex ratio of 116.84 males to 100 females and a literacy rate of 38.59%: 44.91% for males and 31.42% for females. 375,611 (37.67% of the surveyed population) are under 10 years of age. 364,378 (36.54%) live in urban areas.

=== Religion ===
Religions in Khuzdar district (2023)
Religion	Percent
Islam	99.05%
Hinduism	0.49%
Other or not stated	0.45%

In the 2023 census, Islam was the predominant religion, followed by a small minority of mostly-urban Hindus.

=== Language ===
Languages of Khuzdar district (2023)
1. Brahui (78.9%)
2. Balochi (18.7%)
3. Sindhi (1.22%)
4. Others (1.11%)

At the time of the 2023 census, 78.93% of the population spoke Brahui, 18.74% Balochi and 1.22% Sindhi as their first language. Balochi is majority in Gresha sub-tehsil, and Nal and Ornach tehsils. Sindhi is mostly spoken in Karakh sub-division

The majority of the population is made up of Brahui-speaking tribes and according to the 1981 census Brahui was the first language in 82% of households, followed by Balochi with 13%. In the 1998 census, which did not gather data for Brahui, 96.7% of the population reported their language as Balochi, and 1.0% as Punjabi.

== Education ==
According to the Pakistan District Education Rankings 2017, district Khuzdar is ranked at number 122 out of the 141 ranked districts in Pakistan on the education score index. This index considers learning, gender parity and retention in the district.

Literacy rate in 2014–15 of population 10 years and older in the district stands at 45% whereas for females it is only 26%.

Post primary access is a major issue in the district with 87% schools being at primary level. Compare this with high schools which constitute only 5% of government schools in the district. This is also reflected in the enrolment figures for 2016–17 with 23,848 students enrolled in class 1 to 5 and only 698 students enrolled in class 9 and 10.

Gender disparity is another issue in the district. Only 30% schools in the district are girls’ schools. Access to education for girls is a major issue in the district and is also reflected in the low literacy rates for females.

Moreover, the schools in the district lack basic facilities. According to Alif Ailaan district education rankings 2017, the district is ranked at number 127 out of the 155 districts of Pakistan for primary school infrastructure. At the middle school level, it is ranked at number 133 out of the 155 districts. These rankings take into account the basic facilities available in schools including drinking water, working toilet, availability of electricity, existence of a boundary wall and general building condition. More than 4 out of 5 schools do not have electricity in them. 1 out 3 schools lack a toilet and 1 out of 2 do not have a boundary wall. 1 out of 3 schools do not have clean drinking water. In Khuzdar District there are 48 Private Schools, Sunrise School was first private school Established in 1992.

== See also ==
- Tehsils of Pakistan
  - Tehsils of Balochistan
- Districts of Pakistan
  - Districts of Balochistan
- Divisions of Pakistan
  - Divisions of Balochistan

== Bibliography ==
- 1981 District census report of Khuzdar. Census publication. Vol. 12. Islamabad: Population Census Organization, Statistics Division, Government of Pakistan. 1983.
- 1998 District census report of Khuzdar. Census publication. Vol. 108. Islamabad: Population Census Organization, Statistics Division, Government of Pakistan. 2000.
