= Wadh Tehsil =

Pakistani administrative area

Wadh Brahui: تحصیل وڈھ
- Tehsil of Wadh District
- Location within Balochistan, Pakistan Location within Pakistan
- Coordinates: 27°21′0″N 66°26′20″E
- Country: Pakistan
- Province: Balochistan
- District: Wadh District
- Headquarter: Wadh

Area
  - Tehsil of Wadh District: 2,118 km^{2} (818 sq mi)

Population (2023)
  - Tehsil of Wadh District: 116,229
  - Density: 54.88/km^{2} (142.1/sq mi)
  - Urban: 26,875 (23.12%)
  - Rural: 89,354 (76.88%)

Literacy
  - Literacy rate: 31.83%
- Time zone: UTC+5 (PST)
- Main languages: 111,405 Brahui, 2,108 Balochi

Wadh (Brahui: وڈھ; Balochi: وڈھ, pronounced [ʋəɖʱ]) is an administrative subdivision (tehsil) of Wadh District in Balochistan, Pakistan. It is one of ten administrative units comprising both tehsils and sub-tehsils within the district, alongside Nal and Ornach.

Until 1 March 1974, Wadh was part of the former Jhalawan state. On that date, it was designated as one of the three original tehsils (along with Nal and Khuzdar) upon the establishment of a separate district within Balochistan.

== Population ==
Historical population
Year	Pop.	±% p.a.
1951	...	—
1961	19,152	—
1972	39,226	+6.73%
1981	35,263	−1.18%
1998	52,333	+2.35%
2017	100,115	+3.47%
2023	116,229	+2.52%
Source: Pakistan Bureau of Statistics:

According to the 2023 national census, Wadh Tehsil has a total population of 116,229, comprising 89,354 rural and 26,875 urban residents. The urban population is primarily centred in the town of Wadh, which serves as the tehsil headquarters. The tehsil includes 21,772 households, of which 16,775 are in rural areas and 4,997 in urban settings.

== Education ==
The literacy rate in the tehsil stands at 31.83%, reflecting limited access to formal education. This includes a male literacy rate of 41.57% and a significantly lower female literacy rate of 20.81%, underscoring a notable gender gap in educational attainment.

== Location ==
The tehsil spans an area of 1,352 square kilometres and is characterised by mountainous and arid terrain, typical of the broader geography of central Balochistan. There are some fertile areas used for agriculture. The mineral resources in the tehsil include deposits of barite, chromite, magnesite, manganite.

Geographically, Wadh is bounded by Ornach tehsil to the west, Nal tehsil to the northwest, Khuzdar tehsil to the north, Aranji tehsil to the east, and Lasbela District to the south.
