= Fishing industry in Pakistan =

The Indus River dominates the water resources of Pakistan, transporting enormous quantities of nutrients and sediment to the continental shelf. Natural lakes, reservoirs, river systems and ponds cover 8 mil hectares.

The fishing industry plays a significant part in the national economy of Pakistan. With a coastline of about 650 miles (1,050 km), Pakistan has several fishery resources that have yet to be developed. Most of the coastal population of Sindh and Balochistan depends on fishing for their livelihood. It is also a major export.

The fishing industry is managed by the Fisheries Development Board (FDB) which is under the Ministry of National Food Security & Research, within the Government of Pakistan. The office of the FDB is responsible for promoting and managing Pakistan's fishing industry and coordinating with provincial fisheries departments and other national and international agencies, such as the Asia-Pacific Fishery Commission. The marine subsector is overseen by Marine Fisheries Department (MFD).

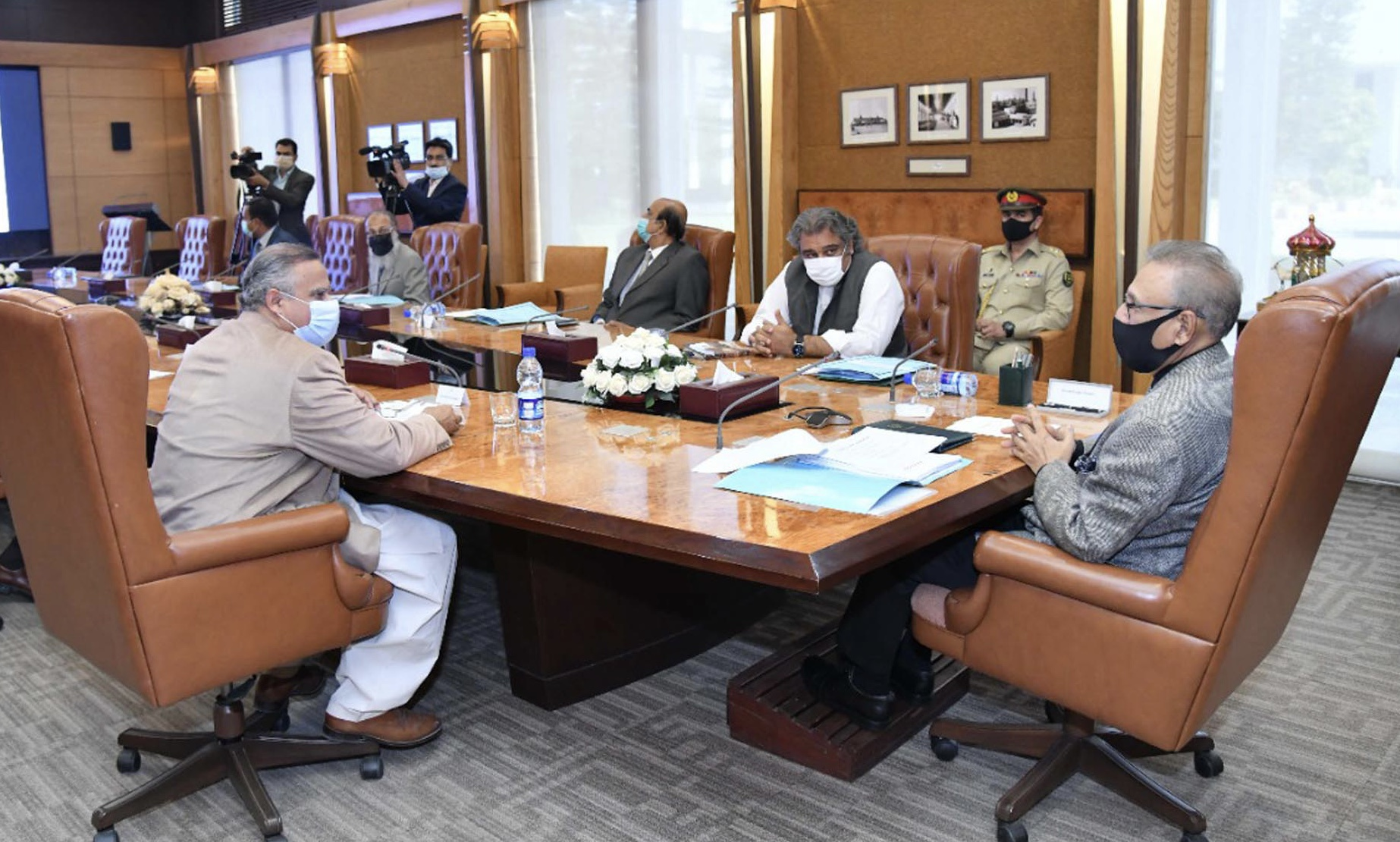
President Arif Alvi getting briefed on Deep Sea Fishing Policy by Maritime Secretary Rizwan Ahmed

The Pakistan Agricultural Research Council (PARC) is engaged in the research of the industry. Some universities in the country are also involved in basic fisheries research.

== Resources ==
Pakistan has many marine and inland fishery resources. The potential was historically estimated at 1 million tonnes/year from the marine subsector alone, but overfishing has reduced annual marine subsector production to approximately 0.51 million tons. Commercially important resources include nearly 250 demersal fish species, 50 small pelagic fish species, 15 medium-sized pelagic species and 20 large pelagic fish species. In addition, there are also 15 commercial species of shrimp, 12 of cephalopods and 5 of lobster. The effect of the Indus River Delta on the marine resources of the coastline of Sindh is substantial, as this river system has been transporting enormous quantities of nutrients and sediment to the continental shelf for centuries. Pakistan also has an extensive inland water areas system, which is mainly dominated by the Indus River. These water bodies, depending on their type, possess varying potential for development of the inland and aquaculture subsectors. Inland water bodies, like dams, water locks, reservoirs, rivers, lakes and ponds cover an area of approximately 8,000,000 hectares (31,000 sq mi).

=== Marine populations ===
Crustacean species fished in Pakistan include parapenaeopsis stylifera, penaeus merguiensis, portunus sanguinolentus and panulirus polyphagus. However, research has shown that commercial species of crustaceans, like shrimps and lobsters, are overexploited. Crabs, cephalopods and other molluscs are an unconventional resource. However, they may be a potential replacement, in the export market, for overfished crustaceans.

Demersal fish resources show signs of being exploited, and thus limited expansion is possible in future. There may be a possibility of expanding the catch of small pelagic fish by venturing further offshore, but fishermen would likely have to use new methods to do this. Some larger pelagic fish, especially skipjack tuna and its relatives, are available in the Exclusive Economic Zone of Pakistan, managed by the Karachi District. Fishing for these usually result in by-catches of marlin and shark species. Local fishing fleet commonly harvest Frigate mackerel, Indian mackerel, Spanish mackerel, barracuda and dolphinfish. As of 2025, these species are also being overfished relative to maximum sustainable yield level.

A large variety of mesopelagic fish exist just off the continental shelf and are barely exploited. These resources are prime candidates for conversion to fishmeal for use in poultry and aquaculture. However, Pakistan does not currently have the processing capability to make use of this resource.

Mussels, oysters, clams, seaweed, kelp, sea urchins and other marine resources also exist in Pakistan, but further research data is required in order to evaluate the feasibility of propagating the mariculture of these varieties.

== Subsectors ==
=== Marine subsector ===
Pakistan has a continental shelf area of 50,270 km^{2} (19,410 square miles) and coastline length of 1,120 km (700 miles). The total maritime zone of Pakistan is over 30% of the land area. The Indus River Delta is characterized by a meshwork of estuaries and creeks with mangrove forestry which serves as nursery grounds for species of finfish and shellfish.

==== Harbours ====
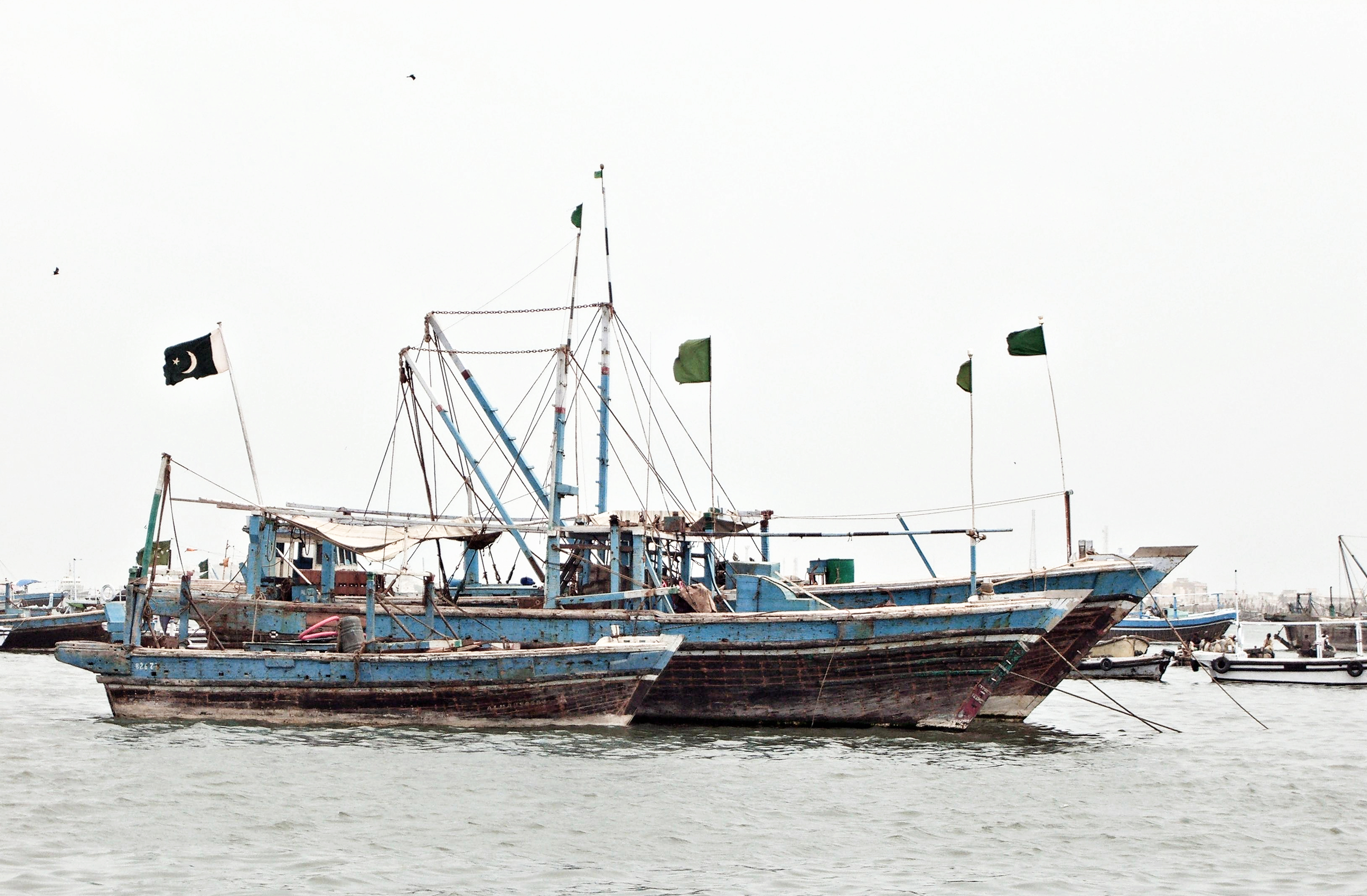
A docked fishing vessel at Karachi Fish Harbour

In 1958, the first modern fish harbour was constructed in the Karachi District. Later, the fleet expanded and is now mostly mechanized. Karachi Fish Harbour is the biggest and oldest harbour in Pakistan, used by all types of fishing boats. Currently more than 7,000 fishing craft are based in it. As of 2018, it had 25 processing facilities established. At present, it handles 90% of Pakistan's fish and seafood catches and 95% of fish and seafood exports. It is operated by the Provincial Government of Sindh.

The other major fish harbours of Pakistan are:

- Korangi Fish Harbour, operated by the Federal Ministry of Ports & Shipping, it was originally built to cater to deep sea fishing but now supports all types and, as of 2024, it served as home port for approximately 300 boats and has fourteen processing facilities.
- Pasni Fish Harbour, operated by the Provincial Government of Balochistan, it hosts small artisanal boats and large gillnetters. Originally designed to support 500 vessels, it has been affected by heavy siltation and has no active processing facilities.
- Gwadar Fish Harbour, operated by the Federal Ministry of Communication, it mostly caters to large gillnetters but has a pontoon for small artisanal boats. As of 2026, China has invested in the port and is building large processing facilities.

==== Methods ====
===== Shrimp fishing =====
Shrimp fishing is a major part of Pakistan's fishing industry, because of the foreign exchange it earns and employment it creates. It is only permitted in province of Sindh. Most shrimp is caught via trawling. Commercial shrimp trawling started in 1958, after the MFD introduced mechanization of larger fishing vessels. Now, almost all shrimp trawlers are equipped with winches for net hauling. However, shrimp is also caught using the cast net, which is locally termed thukri. Shrimp fishing is mainly carried out in shallow depths, from October to March, and estuaries and brackish waters, from July to September. The catch is then processed and frozen for export to North American and European markets.

===== Tuna fishing =====
Tuna fishing is another main sector of the industry, usually carried out by artisanal fishing. Usually, the fleet sends out gillnets in the evening and fetches them the next morning. The main target are the pelagic species, which have higher commercial values. The catch is exported frozen to Iran, through informal channels, for canning purposes. This fetches more profit than if exported to Sri Lanka in dried and salted form.

===== Benthic fishing =====
Deep sea resources remain comparatively unexploited, because local vessels are neither suitable nor equipped for deep-water fishery. Some entrepreneurs have developed their own deep-sea fishing craft to make use of this resource. Small-scale benthic or demersal fishing is most common in coastal inshore waters. Fishermen use nylon gillnet, locally termed ruch, with a mesh of about 150 mm long. Benthic varieties include the marine jewfish, croakers, grunters, snappers, groupers, ribbonfish and pomfrets.

===== Pelagic fishing =====
A small-scale pelagic fishing industry is in operation in Sindh, using special nets, locally termed katra. Fishing is carried out from hora boats - wooden sailboats with pointed ends, a broad breadth and long-shaft outboard engine. In depths shallower than 20 m (66 ft), shoals of clupeids, especially the Indian Oil Sardine, are caught. Such operations are mainly based at Ibrahim Hydri and Chashma Goth villages. Pelagic fishing takes place from October to November and February to April. The catch is the prime candidate for conversion into fishmeal.

==== Vessels ====
In 2000, the number of docked fishery vessels was near 6,000. This increased to nearly 8,000, out of 29,100 total vessels, in 2018. The two main types of fishing craft are:

- Mechanized docked boats: As of 2018, here3were approximately 600 trawlers and 5550 gillnetters.registered Both are usually made of wood, according to traditional designs, and fitted with 80–220 hp diesel engines. The average length of a trawler is 10–25 m (33–82 ft) while that of a gillnetter is 15–35 m (49–115 ft). For hauling, many trawlers have a transom stern. Gillnetters are pointed at both ends and the net is pulled over the side. Freezing vessels also operate in the EEZ and all their catch is exported.
- Mechanized sailboats: Made of wood and equipped with two or more outboard engines, but generally smaller than docked vessels, they are locally called hora boats. Most of these sailboats now operate in freshwater bodies. Doonda boats are custom-built fibreglass scrapped lifeboats, with an average length of 7–10 m (23–33 ft) m and 22–33 hp engines. These boats are able to function in depths of up to 20 m (66 ft). As of 2016, there were approximately 12,000 active boats of this kind.

=== Inland subsector ===
Freshwater fisheries are dominated by the Indus River and its tributaries. The northern part of the Indus system has cold-water fish, while the greater middle and southern parts of the system have warm-water fish. About 30 species are fished, including carp, tilapia and trout, and most inland-caught fish are consumed locally.

Fisheries in rivers and reservoirs account for more than 80% of total inland fish production. The riverine fishery management system is operated mainly by provincial fisheries departments. They enforce regulatory laws that restrict catch by size of fish and establish closed seasons. As of 2022, around 253,000 people were involved in the inland freshwater fishing industry.

==== Lakes ====
In Sindh alone, there are more than 100 natural lakes of different sizes, covering an area of about 100,000 hectares (247,000 acres). Among these, Kinjhar Lake (13,468 ha (33,300 acres)), north of Thatta, and Manchar Lake (roughly 25,000 ha (61,800 acres)), in Dadu District, are the most important for fish production. However, fish stocks and thus fishing capacity has dwindled throughout the 21st century. Apart from these big lakes, a cluster of small lakes extend over 40,000 ha (98,800 acres). The natural lakes in Punjab cover about 7,000 ha (17,300 acres). Some of the lakes, such as Namal Lake (480 ha (1,190 acres)), Uchhali Lake (943 ha (2,330 acres)), Jahlar Lake (100 ha (250 acres)), Kallar Kahar Lake (100 ha (250 acres)), Kharal Lake (235 ha (580 acres)) and Khabikki Lake (283 ha (700 acres)) are brackish and are too saline to support capture fishery. Manmade reservoirs include the Mangla Dam reservoir, Tarbela Dam reservoir and Chashma Barrage reservoir.

=== Aquaculture subsector ===
Aquaculture (fish farming) was introduced to Pakistan in the 1970s and is relatively undeveloped compared to its neighbors. However, there is immense potential for development of the sector. Aquaculture production has rapidly increased since the 2000s, growing from 12,485 tonnes in 2000 to 168,700 in 2023, and is now about 25% of Pakistan's total fishery output. Aquaculture has received a substantial amount of government investment, and facilities are now in place that can provide the basis for a major future expansion.

In Pakistan, the fish fauna is rich, but only seven warm water species and two cold water species have traditionally been cultivated on a commercial scale. As of 2025, carp accounted for 95% of Pakistan's aquaculture output. Other species groups farmed include trout and salmon, catfishes, tilapia, freshwater shrimps and perch-like fishes. Tilapia, shrimp and catfishes are newer additions to the aquaculture ecosystem.

==== Freshwater farming ====
Freshwater carp farming is the major aquaculture activity in Punjab, Sindh and Khyber Pakhtunkhwa. The northern mountains of Pakistan have good potential for trout culture, but production is still very small. As of 2024, Pakistan had over 172,000 acres (69,600 hectares) acres of land dedicated to aquaculture: 44,000 acres (18,000 ha) in Punjab, 124,400 acres (50,300 ha) in Sindh, 2,750 acres (1,110 ha) in Khyber Pukhtunkhwa and 1,000 acres (400 ha) in Balochistan. Almost 11,500 fish farms have been established across Pakistan. As of 2022, the average size ranged from 12 to 25 acres (5 to 10 ha). About 90,000 people are employed in the sector.

In Sindh, the majority of farms are located in Thatta, Badin and Dadu, the three districts through which the River Indus passes. Badin and Thatta have waterlogged floodplain areas suitable for fish farming. In Punjab, farms are located mostly in irrigated areas or where there is abundant rain and the soil is alluvial. Muzaffar Garh, Multan, Sheikhupura, Gujranwala and Attock districts have most farms. Khyber-Pukhtunkhwa has comparatively fewer farms, with trout farms in Chitral, Swat, Dir, Malakand, Mansehra and the former FATA. Carp culture is practised in Dera Ismail Khan, Kohat, Mardan, Swabi and the Abbottabad districts. At present, three species, brown trout, kamloop and rainbow trout, are being produced and cultured successfully.

The traditional species ratio on a carp farm is catla (10–20%), rohu (30–35%), mrigal (15–20%), grass carp (15–20%) and silver carp (15–20%). Some carp farms use a semi-intensive culture system. Intensive aquaculture has not yet been developed because of non-availability of low-cost feed and limited production expertise.

==== Technological developments ====
Lack of awareness of modern aquaculture techniques and floating aquafeed had been the major impediments in development of this sector. The FEEDing Pakistan Program's Aquaculture Program, funded by the United States Department of Agriculture (USDA) and supported by the American Soybean Association's World Initiative for Human Health (ASA/WISHH), aimed to both introduce floating soy-based feed and promote tilapia aquaculture in Pakistan, alongside the FDB in Pakistan. The major tangible outcome of this program was the establishment Pakistan's first extruded aquafeed mill, in 2013, and tilapia hatchery, in 2014. Since then, more technologies have been introduced. In 2019, Pakistan's first In-Pond Raceways Systems (IPRS) was built. IPRS combine the features and benefits of raceway technology, cage culture, recirculating aquaculture system and pond culture. A 2019 report claimed the following benefits from the introduction of IPRS:

- Improved fish production of 75 kg/m^{3} (4.7 pounds per cubic foot) to 150 kg/m^{3} (9.4 pounds per cubic foot)
- Reduced production cost per unit of fish production of <30 – 35%
- Improved Feed Conversion (FCR: 1.00 – 1.4) and feeding efficiency
- 100% fish catch rate without discharge of water from pond
- Staggered stocking and harvest and culturing different species in different raceways, leading to minimized market price risk
- Easier fish health management and production operation, with minimal use of drugs and chemicals to ensure food security
- 70% nutrient capture in the form of feces and use as crop fertilizer
- Zero water discharge, with water only added to compensate for evaporative loss or seepage
- Ecofriendly techniques
- Harvest procedures and cost of labor for fish movement simplified and significantly reduced
- Efficient provision of animal protein to consumers.

==== Mariculture potential ====
Coastal aquaculture (or mariculture) is almost absent in Pakistan despite its potential. Several attempts at shrimp farming in the Indus River Delta have been made, and farms are currently active at Hawkes Bay, Clifton and Gharo. In 2007, a mariculture farm in Sonmiani was funded by USAID for developing sustainable production of edible shrimp which was still running as a shrimp hatchery as of 2023. The potential for developing hatcheries of other crustacean varieties exist as well. Recent advances in the field of genetic engineering indicate that marine oysters can also be farmed. Although Pakistan has 9 native species of oysters, belonging to Crassostrea, Saccostrea and Ostrea, there is, at present, no commercial harvesting or hatchery culture of oysters in the country.

=== Recreation subsector ===
Recreational fishing in Pakistan is usually overseen by the Pakistan Game Fish Association (PGFA). There are three main types of recreational fisheries in Pakistan: billfish and tuna fishing in the EEZ of Karachi; sport fishing (pelagic) in coastal waters; and hand-line fishing (bottom fishing) in inter-tidal and shallow waters. In 2009, about 1,000 people, with 120–150 fishing boats, were involved in this sector. No license is required. However, their boats are required to be registered by Marine Mercantile department for seaworthiness. There are three main boating clubs: the Karachi Yacht Club, the Karachi Boat Club and the Defence Marina Club. A number of fishing tournaments take place annually, such as the All Pakistan Billfish Tournament and Fish'nTac Angling Championship, Karachi. From 1999 to 2023, the reigning Pakistan Saltwater Angling Champion was Orooj Ahmed Ali, who caught a Black marlin weighing 180 kg (397 lb) in the All Pakistan Billfish Tournament on December 5, 1999. In 2023, this was broken by Khalid Moin Ahmed, who caught a Marlin weighing 210 kg (463 lb).

== Production ==
=== Annual capture ===
Marine fisheries resources and production in 2006 (tonnes)
Resources		Biomass	MSY	Production
Fish	Demersal fish	500,000	213,000	175,674
Fish	Small pelagic fish	700,000	225,000	100,000
Fish	Large pelagic fish^{[a]}	80,000	43,000	47,000
Crustaceans	Shrimps^{[a]}	88,000	18,000	18,433
Crustaceans	Lobster^{[a]}	8,000	2,000	600
Crustaceans	Crabs	25,000	8,500	4,218
Molluscs	Cephalopods^{[b]}	30,000	11,000	5,400
Molluscs	Gastropods^{[b]}	20,000	5,000	731
Total		1,451,000	525,500	352,056

=== Gross national product ===
The Federal Bureau of Statistics provisionally valued this sector at Rs. 18,290 million in 2005, a 10% growth compared to 2000. In 2026, the Press Information Department estimated that exports of fish and fisheries products surpassed $500 million, or ₨ 139.16 billion.

As of 2025, the fishing industry sector contributes about 0.39% to the country's GDP.

Gross National Product of Pakistan: Fishery (Rs. million)
Year	1999-00	2000-01	2001-02	2002-03	2003-04	2004-05	2005-06	2006-07	2007-08	2008-09	2009-10
GNP	15,163	16,546	16,377	16,625	16,728	17,490	30,492	42,668	52,391	53,731	56,182

== Processing ==
Marine fish is exported fresh, frozen, canned, cured, reduced to fishmeal or for other purposes, and some is retained by fishermen for their own use. The freshwater catch is marketed fresh for local consumption. In 2026, 60% of total fish production was for human consumption: 30% exported and 30% consumed domestically. The rest of the catch was used for other purposes, especially reduction to fishmeal.

Fish and shrimp processing is divided into mechanical and non-mechanical processing. Mechanical processing includes freezing, canning, fishmeal production and fish liver oil extraction. Non-mechanical processing includes drying fish and shrimp, processing shark fin, extracting fish maw/stomach, exporting live lobster and crab and extracting fish roe/ovaries. As of 2018, Pakistan has 7 processing plants for the production of frozen products, two for canning and 8 for fishmeal processing. Almost all of the frozen and canned fishery product is exported, while the bulk of the processed fishmeal is used in Pakistan for the manufacture of poultry or fish feed.

== Marketing ==
The marketing chain for fish is similar to that for other agricultural commodities. Products are sold via auction to wholesalers, retailers and production facilities, through middlemen who work on a commission basis. Farmed fish tend to be marketed either at the farm gate, through intermediaries, or by open auction, where ice-packed fish is sent to fish markets and sold. Buyers may be members of the public, retailers, wholesalers and agents for processing plants or exporters. Fish markets are very common in Sindh and at selected locations in Punjab. All markets are under the control of the local administrations. Most fish markets have inadequate facilities; usually they lack cold storage facilities and have poor hygienic conditions and inadequate communication links. Most aquaculture product is consumed locally.

Prices tend to decline when the fish is more than 3 kg (6.6 lb); other factors include freshness of the fish and the supply–demand situation in the market. Local consumers generally prefer freshwater fish over marine fish, because of their familiarity with river and inland farmed fish, as well as the fresh condition of the product. This difference is reflected in both wholesale and retail prices, where freshwater fish is sold at a higher price than marine fish.

== Consumption ==
Throughout the world, including Pakistan, fish is considered a cheap source of protein diet. In 2000, per capita food supply from fish and fishery products was 2 kg in Pakistan, compared to 18 kg in all of Asia and 16 kg globally. Fish protein as a percentage of total protein supply in Pakistan was only 1%, compared to 10% in all of Asia and 6% globally. Processed fishery products can include fish meal (poultry feed, aquaculture feed), fish oil and fish glue. The annual per capita fish consumption in Pakistan has continued to be about 2 kg.

Fishery products consumption (2006)
Fishery products	Production	Import	Export	Total supply	Per capita supply (kg/year)
Fishery products	(tonnes)				Per capita supply (kg/year)
Products for direct human consumption	611,246	2,040	151,830	326,921	2.0
Products for animal feed and other purposes	134,535	-	-	-	-

== See also ==
- Agriculture in Pakistan
- Forestry in Pakistan
- Economy of Pakistan
- Asia-Pacific Fishery Commission

== Footnotes ==
- a. Over-exploited, as total production is more than MSY.
- b. Needs further assessment.
