= Pasni =

Pasni may refer to:

- Pasni (celebration), a Nepalese name for Annaprashana, a child-weaning ceremony in Hinduism
- Pasni (city), Gwadar District, Balochistan, Pakistan
  - Pasni Airport
  - Pasni Fish Harbour
  - Pasni Tehsil
  - Port of Pasni
