= List of ports in Pakistan =

This is a list of ports in Pakistan. There are three international seaports, seventeen dry ports, twelve fishing harbours, and five naval bases.

== Seaports ==
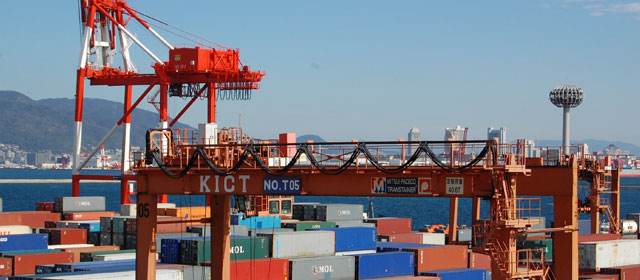
Containers at the Karachi International Container Terminal at the Port of Karachi.

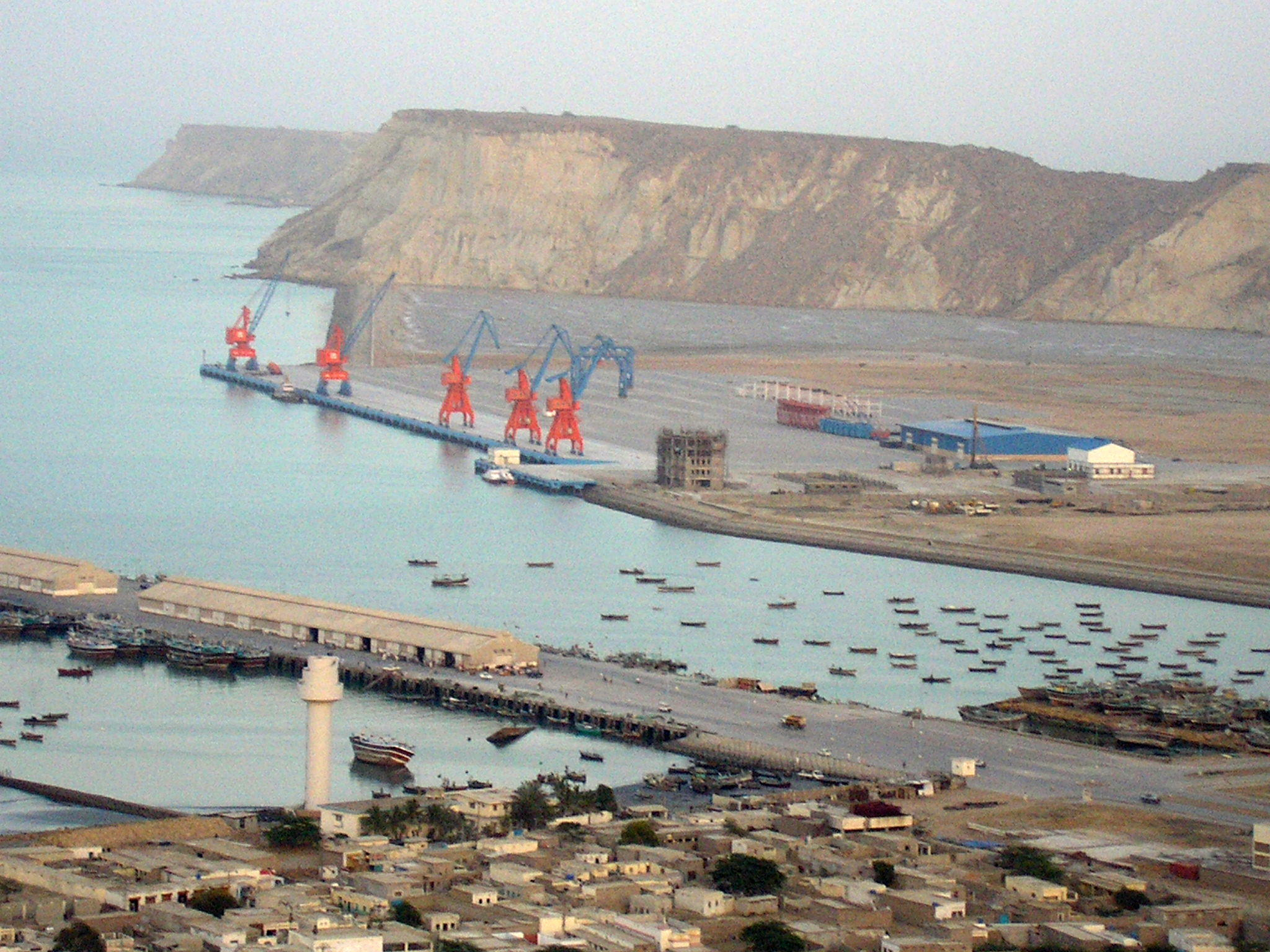
Aerial view of Gwadar harbour, showing the international port in the background and the fishing harbour in the foreground.

All seaports in Pakistan are maintained and governed by the Ministry of Maritime Affairs of the Government of Pakistan. The three largest ports each have their own port authority.

Name	District	Province	Location	Authority	Description
Port of Karachi	Keamari	Sindh	24.836°N 66.979°E	Karachi Port Trust	41 berths including: Karachi Gateway Terminal (5 berths); Karachi Gateway Terminal Multipurpose (6 berths); Karachi International Container Terminal; South Asia Pakistan Terminal (4 berths)
Port Qasim	Malir	Sindh	24.769°N 67.325°E	Port Qasim Authority	15 berths including: Pakistan International Bulk Terminal; Qasim International Container Terminal; Engro Vopak Terminal; Fotco Oil Terminal
Gwadar Port	Gwadar	Balochistan	25.111°N 62.342°E	Gwadar Port Authority	3 multipurpose berths (150 planned)

- Note that "Karachi Harbour" is sometimes used as an alternative name for the Port of Karachi. However, the harbour is a larger body of water that also includes a fishing harbour, a shipyard, three naval bases, and several ferry terminals, as well as extensive wetlands and mangrove forests.

== Dry ports ==
Apart from the seaports, there are a number of dry ports, located elsewhere in the country, which allow goods to undergo customs checks away from the dock side. Six major dry ports are run by Pakistan Railways:

- Lahore Dry Port (opened 1973) (31.556°N 74.372°E)
- Karachi Dry Port (opened 1974) (24.847°N 66.995°E)
- Quetta Dry Port (opened 1984, now closed) (30.186°N 66.998°E)
- Peshawar Dry Port (opened 1986) (34.004°N 71.380°E)
- Multan Dry Port (opened 1988) (30.090°N 71.353°E)
- Rawalpindi Dry Port (opened 1990) (33.599°N 73.094°E)

The following dry ports are run by private companies:

- Sialkot Dry Port (opened 1986)
- Faisalabad Dry Port (opened 1994)
- Pak-China Sust Dry Port (36°41'29"N 74°49'31"E)
- NLC Dry Port at Thokar Niaz Beg, southwest of Lahore (31°27'53"N 74°13'54"E)
- NLC Dry Port at Quetta (30°13'51"N 67°00'28"E)
- QICT Dry port at Prem Nagar railway station, southwest of Lahore (opened 2010)
- Sialkot International Container Terminal (32°29'12"N 74°22'31"E)

Other dry ports are located at:

- Hyderabad NLC Dry Port (25°24'42"N 68°21'12"E)
- Islamabad Dry Port (33°39'52"N 73°03'00"E)
- Multan Dry Port (30°05'27"N 71°21'11"E)
- Kasur Dry Port

== Fish harbours ==
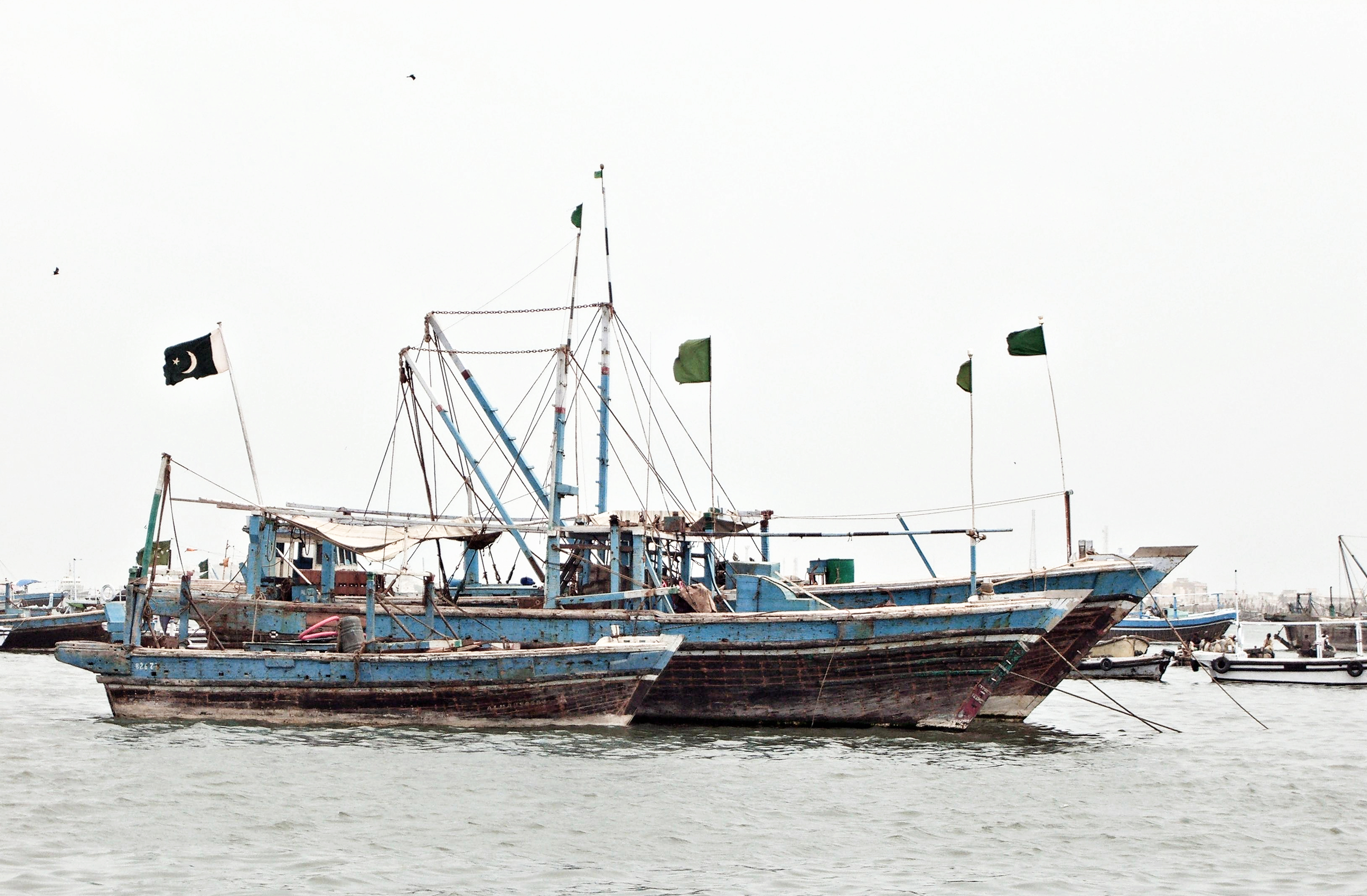
Fishing boats at Karachi Fish Harbour

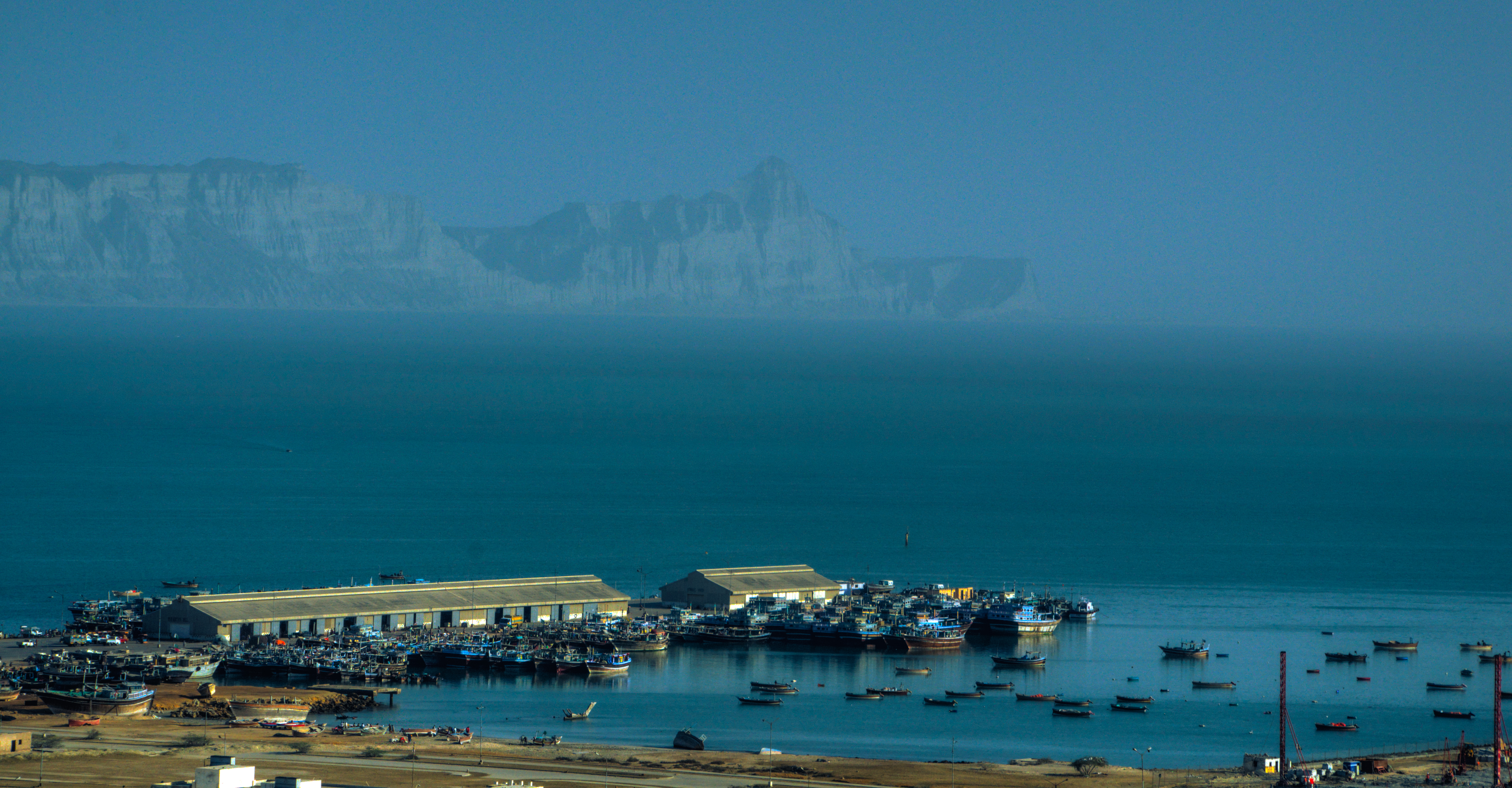
View of Gwadar Fish Harbour

There are a number of fish harbours, most of which were built from 2002 onwards but have been controversial because of damage to the local environments. The harbours are managed by the provincial fisheries departments of Sindh and Balochistan.

- Damb Fish Harbour, Lasbela District
- Gadani Fish Harbour, Hub District
- Godi Boat Basin, Gwadar District (25°07'28"N 62°18'41"E)
- Gwadar Fish Harbour, Gwadar District
- Jiwani Fish Harbour, Gwadar District
- Karachi Fish Harbour, Keamari District
- Korangi Fish Harbour, Korangi Creek Cantonment
- Keti Bandar Fish Harbour, Thatta District
- Ormara Fish Harbour, Gwadar District
- Pasni Fish Harbour, Gwadar District
- Pishukan Fish Harbour, Gwadar District
- Surbandar Fish Harbour, Gwadar District (25°13'41"N 62°27'59"E)

== Miscellaneous port facilities ==
- The Hub Power Company, Hub District, has its own coal import jetty adjacent to the power plant (24°54'55"N 66°40'22"E).
- The Karachi Nuclear Power Complex, in Keamari District, has its own harbour for nuclear power-related cargo (24°50'37"N 66°46'53"E).

== Naval bases ==
Major military ports

- Karachi Naval Dockyard, Keamari District
- Jinnah Naval Base, Ormara, Gwadar District

Minor military ports

- PNS Akram, Gwadar District
- PNS Himalaya, Manora Cantonment
- PNS Qasim, Manora Cantonment

== Shipyards ==
- Gadani Ship Breaking Yard, Hub District
- Gwadar Shipyard, Gwadar District (proposed)
- Karachi Shipyard & Engineering Works, Keamari District

== Proposed ports ==
- The Port of Gadani in Hub District, currently comprises the Gadani Fish Harbour and the Gadani Ship Breaking Yard. In August 2019 the federal government announced there would be a feasibility study to look at building a modern port at Gadani.
- The Port of Keti Bandar in Thatta District, in the western part of the Indus River Delta, was a thriving port until the early part of the 20th century but now consists of a fishing jetty and a coast guard jetty for the Pakistan Maritime Security Agency. There was a proposal by the federal government to build a new port in 2007, which came to naught. More recently a new proposal has been put forward in April 2024 by the Sindh provincial government.
- The Port of Sonmiani, in Las Bela District, currently consists of a fish harbour at the town of Damb, about 4 km (2.5 mi) northwest of Sonmiani as well as a coast guard jetty for the Pakistan Maritime Security Agency, a kilometre to the north of the fish harbour. In March 2007 the federal government announced a proposal to build a major new port at Sonmiani (tentatively titled Aladdin Port). The provincial government carried out a survey of the area as preparation for a new port, together with allocating thousands of acres of land for future construction. However, the plans never materialised.

== See also ==
- Pakistan National Shipping Corporation
