= Pakistan Fisherfolk Forum =

The Pakistan Fisherfolk Forum (PFF) is a non-governmental organisation based in Karachi, Pakistan which works to advance social, economic, cultural and political rights of fishermen and fishing communities in Pakistan. The body came into establishment as a social welfare organisation on 5 May 1998. Since its inception, it has gathered 25,000 volunteers; the stated objectives of the group target a wide array of issues which are directly or indirectly associated with about 4 million fishers in Pakistan. Some of these are:

- Socioeconomic and political rights of fishermen
- Bringing sustainable fishery policies
- Advocating a ban on sea trawlers
- Stopping depletion of natural resources in the sea and the use of destructive nets
- Preserving the Indus Delta from degradation
- Abolishing contract systems and bringing license systems in inland water bodies
- Supporting the release and rehabilitation of detained Pakistani fishers in Indian jails and Indian fishers in Pakistani jails
- Bringing general sustainability in the usage of water resources

== See also ==
- Fisheries Research and Training Institute, Lahore Pakistan
