= Gwadar Fish Harbour =

- Click on the map for a fullscreen view

Location
- Country: Pakistan
- Location: Gwadar, Balochistan
- Coordinates: 25°07′35″N 62°19′21″E

Details
- Owned by: Government of Balochistan
- Type of harbour: coastal breakwater

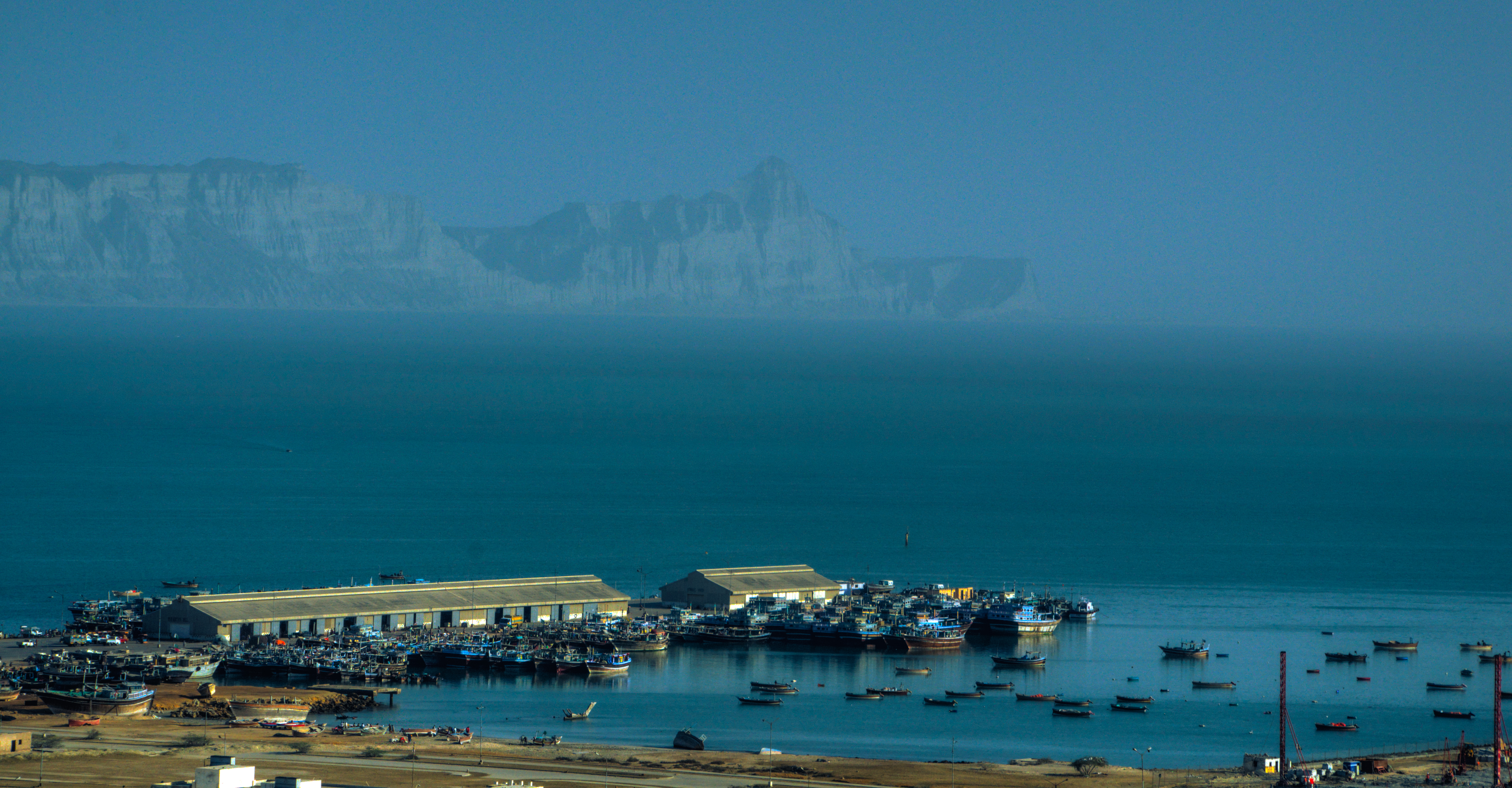
View of Gwadar Port’s fish harbour

Gwadar Fish Harbour is located in the city of Gwadar, in the Gwadar District of southwestern Balochistan Province, southwest Pakistan.

It is operated by the Federal Ministry of Communication.

== See also ==
- List of ports in Pakistan#Fish harbours
- Karachi Fisheries Harbour Authority
- Fisheries Research and Training Institute, Lahore
- Pishukan
