= Gadani Fish Harbour =

- Click on the map for a fullscreen view

Location
- Country: Pakistan
- Location: Gadani, Balochistan
- Coordinates: 25°07′04″N 66°43′18″E

Details
- Owned by: Government of Balochistan
- Type of harbour: coastal breakwater

Gadani Fish Harbour is a coastal fishing facility located in the town of Gadani, within the Hub District of Balochistan, Pakistan. Positioned on the Arabian Sea, approximately 30 kilometres (19 mi) northwest of Karachi, the harbour was established as a centre for the local fishing industry. The project was planned with the involvement of the Balochistan Coastal Development Authority (BCDA) to support the livelihoods of fishing communities and strengthen maritime infrastructure in the province.

The harbour is considered crucial for the economic well-being of the surrounding population, with its development expected to enhance local business opportunities and raise living standards. However, challenges remain, including a long-standing land ownership dispute, which was brought to the attention of the national parliament in 2019. Addressing such issues is viewed as essential for the sustainable development and full utilisation of the harbour's potential.

== See also ==
- List of ports in Pakistan#Fish harbours
- Karachi Fisheries Harbour Authority
- Fisheries Research and Training Institute, Lahore Pakistan
