= Keti Bandar Port =

Pakistan port

Keti Bandar
- Interactive map of Keti Bandar
- Location within Sindh Location within Pakistan

Location
- Coordinates: 24°08′40″N 67°27′03″E
- UN/LOCODE: PKKBA

Details
- No. of piers: 1

The Port of Keti Bandar (Urdu: کیٹی بندر گاہ) is a minor seaport in the town of Keti Bandar, in the middle of the Indus River delta and near the Arabian Sea, in Thatta District, Sindh province, Pakistan. It is approximately 90 kilometres (56 mi) southeast of the much larger Port of Karachi. The port facilities comprise a fishing boat pier and a coast guard base operated by the Pakistan Maritime Security Agency.

== Overview ==
Keti Bandar was built 46 km west of Shah Bandar because the latter was sinking into the ground and the Indus River had changed direction. Dada Sindhi, the author of Sindh Ke Bandar Aur Bazar (English: Ports and Streets of Sindh), writes that Shah Bandar was built by Mian Ghulam Shah Kalhoro, the founder of Hyderabad city. In 1659, trade was carried out through Irung Bandar, which was built by Aurangzeb Alamgir. The traces are still there today. Shah Bandar began to decline in 1819, after which Keti Bandar was established. The traces are still there today from which trade was carried out to Bombay, Madras, the Persian Gulf, and Sonmiani and Makran. It used to trade in building timber and heavy goods from Bhuj and Kathiawar.

In the early days of the British rule, this port developed a lot, and the East India Company also used to send goods thence. This Port played an important role in the economy of Sindh. Mr. Hudson, the then Commissioner of the Province of Sindh, in his report of 1905 mentions Keti Bandar as a central and commercial town, in 1845 its population was recorded as 2542 and in 1932 it was given the status of a Municipal Committee. Apart from that fish trade and port, the area also had fertile agricultural land that was irrigated by the Indus River every year, producing a variety of fruits including red rice, bananas, coconuts, melons and watermelons. Considering the importance of this port, the British government of that time implemented a basic system of customs office, navigation, monitoring and port taxation in Keti Bandar.

=== Downfall ===
As soon as the modern canal system was built on the Indus River and the Sukkur Barrage was constructed in 1932, the inflow of river water decreased, which affected its agriculture and the Keti Bandar lost its glory. The trade and management of Keti Bandar was with the Hindu community, according to a WWF report, after the creation of Pakistan, 7,000 to 8,000 Hindu people migrated from here to India by ship. According to anthropologist Abdul Haq Chang, after the 1965 war, the rest of the Hindu families also left here.

Dr. Kaleemullah Lashari says that since the nineteenth century, this port began to lose its momentum. Karachi Port Trust was formed, after which the railway service was established, from which the cotton and wheat in Punjab started going to the port, while there was no direct route to Keti Bandar. Due to lack of accessibility, it lost its importance.

The inflow of river water decreased and the agricultural lands became depopulated and the financial condition of the people weakened. Abdul Haq says that the situation was a little better till 1992, but when the river water did not come, the underground sea water moved forward and made drinking water difficult. Water also became unavailable and as a result a large number of people had to migrate from here.

=== "Soldiers of the sea" ===
The city of Keti Bander has also weathered floods and storms, sinking three times due to hurricanes and sea advances in 1857, 1877 and 1910. Archaeologist and researcher Dr Kaleemullah Lashari says that due to an earthquake during the time of the British, this port sank into the sand, after which the modern city of Keti Bandar, located two kilometers away, was built. It was also spared by a storm in 1941, but the storm of 1999 caused great loss of life and property in the area and the surrounding area. There were chances but this storm moved towards Indian Gujarat.

Anthropologist Abdul Haq Chang says that the mangroves have decreased due to lack of river water, which prevents the sea from moving forward and weakens the storm waves, so local fishermen call these mangroves the soldiers of the sea. The Sindh government had set a world record by planting more than five lakh mangroves in a single day in 2009 in Keti Bandar, after which this exercise has been repeated twice, resulting in improved growth of mangroves here. However, a large area including Kharo Chan has been swallowed up by the sea; a wall was built to stop the advance of the sea, but it could not protect the city.

=== Restoration attempts ===
From the government of Zulfikar Ali Bhutto to the current government of Pakistan Peoples Party, many projects have been built including the port of Keti Bandar, Benazir Bhutto planned to build a power plant here on coal from Thar in 1994, but the government of Mian Nawaz Sharif rejected the plan.

Dr. Kaleemullah Lashari says that during the Benazir Bhutto regime, a feasibility report was also prepared for the construction of a road for the port here, but later the priorities changed and Gawadar port got priority.

After coming to power in 2008, the Pakistan People's Party government planned to build a new industrial city called Zulfikarabad here, in which Chinese investors were showing interest, but nationalist parties of Sindh had serious reservations about it. Afterward, this project also got delayed.

== Economy ==
Keti Bandar Project was planned to build a port and power station at Keti Bandar. The Keti Bandar economy completely relies upon fishing and the entire village is dependent on the fishermen who sometimes spend days at a time on their boats in the Arabian Sea. As these fishermen return with their catch they display their products in the open market, where buyers collect the fish and transport it to Karachi.

== See also ==
- List of ports in Pakistan
