= Indo-Pak Joint Judicial Committee =

The Indo-Pak Joint Judicial Committee is composed of eight retired judges – four each from India and Pakistan – charged with investigating the situation of civilians imprisoned in the gaols of the other country and to obtain and facilitate their release, especially that of fishermen imprisoned for straying across territorial waters. The committee was formed in January 2007. Since then it has visited gaols in Pakistan in Karachi, Lahore and Rawalpindi, in April 2011 and Amritsar, Jaipur and Tihar gaols in October 2011. The Committee went into abeyance in 2013, but was being revived in 2018.
