= Gadani Power Project =

Former energy project in Balochistan, Pakistan

- Country: Pakistan
- Status: Abandoned
- Construction cost: PKR 144.6 billion USD 1.5 billion
- Owners: Government of Pakistan and Government of China

Thermal power station
- Primary fuel: Coal Imported from Iran

Power generation
- Units operational: 10×660 MW

The Gadani Power Project (also known as Pakistan Power Park) was a proposed energy complex in Gadani, Balochistan, Pakistan, under the China-Pakistan Economic Corridor. In August 2013, the Pakistani government announced the establishment of ten coal power plants with a total capacity of 6,600 MW, with technical and financial assistance mostly from China. China would provide funds to cover 85% of the project cost, while the rest of the finances would be arranged by the government of Pakistan. The total cost of the project was PKR 144.6 billion.

Ten 660-MW coal-based power plants at Gadani Energy Park were to be constructed. China agreed to invest in six projects, two would be constructed by ANC Dubai, and one by the government of Pakistan. Turkey's Ciner Group also agreed to start work on a 660-MW coal power plant at Gadani.

In May 2017, the project was officially cancelled by the governments of Pakistan and China.
