= Marine Fisheries Department =

Pakistan Government Agency

The Marine Fisheries Department (MFD) (Urdu: ادارہ برائے سمندری ماہی گیری) is a department of the Government of Pakistan. It is part of the Ministry of Maritime Affairs (Pakistan).

== See also ==
- Fisheries Research and Training Institute, Lahore Pakistan
