= Shadi Kaur Dam =

Dam in Balochistan, Pakistan

Coordinates: 25°31′49″N 63°24′57″E

Shadi Kaur Dam (also "Shadikor" (Note: Press reports frequently misspelled the name as "Shakidor".)) is a dam that impounds the Shadi Kaur river about 50 kilometres (31 miles) north of Pasni in Balochistan province of Pakistan. The dam, 485 metres (1,591 feet) long, and 35 metres high, was constructed in 2003 at a cost of 45 million rupees ($758,853) to provide irrigation for nearby farms.

== 2005 Disaster ==
On February 10, 2005, the dam burst due to heavy flooding caused by more than two weeks of heavy rainfall, resulting in the deaths of about 70 villagers due to drowning; the floods washed bodies into the Arabian Sea. Emergency search and rescue operations by the Pakistani military saved the lives of approximately 1,200 people. At least five villages were totally submerged, including Pasni and Ormara. The dam burst in the aftermath of Pakistan's heaviest rainfalls and snowfalls in sixteen years. The waters swept away bridges on the Balochistan to Karachi highway, and led to the temporary closure of the Karakoram Highway.

Another nearby reservoir at Akra Kaur, Gwadar, was overflowing at the same time, and after the Shadi Kaur accident, many villages were evacuated. Many small earthen dams built by the local population on self-help basis, also overflowed.

Researchers blame the dam collapse on design deficiency, including the lack of a spillway.

== Reconstruction ==
After the collapse, a rebuilt dam was planned in 2008, but was delayed; work commenced in February 2010, with help from the Federal Public Sector Development Programme. Its construction was then inaugurated in 2016 by then prime minister Nawaz Sharif, with a storage capacity of 37,000 acre-feet (45,600,000 cubic metres) across an area of 6,650 acres (27 sq. km), for a total cost of Rs7.9bn, grown from an initial projection of Rs 2.637 billion, increased in a series of budget overruns. It now features a spillway.

The dam was expected to provide 70 cusecs (cubic feet per second) of water, equal to 1.98 m^{3}/s, but only 12 cusecs are delivered as of 2024, including 8 cusecs to agriculture and 4 to the town of Pasni via tanker truck.

== See also ==
- List of dams and reservoirs in Pakistan
- Images of the reconstructed dam are linked here
