= Korangi Fish Harbour =

- Click on the map for a fullscreen view

Location
- Country: Pakistan
- Location: Karachi, Sindh
- Coordinates: 24.8844°N 67.1443°E

Details
- Owned by: Government of Sindh
- Type of harbour: river basin

Korangi Fish Harbour is located in Chashma Goth, Deh Rehri, Korangi District, Karachi, Sindh, Pakistan. It is managed by Federal Ministry of Maritime Affairs, Government of Pakistan. The purpose for establishment of KoFHA was to exploit deep sea resources beyond provincial territorial water i.e. beyond 20 nautical miles.

== See also ==
- List of ports in Pakistan#Fish harbours
- Karachi Fisheries Harbour Authority
