= Pasni Fish Harbour =

Harbour located in Pansi, Pakistan

Pasni Fish Harbour is located in Pasni, Balochistan, Pakistan, operated by the Government of Balochistan.

Pasni Fish Harbor was inaugurated by Prime Minister Benazir Bhutto in 1989. The harbor was constructed at a cost of Rs. 445 million and covers an area of approximately 100,000 meters. It included an approach channel, harbor basin and berthing area with proper facilities, buildings, water supply, a cargo jetty, four landing berths, market halls and a harbor authority building. The establishment of the harbor had led to rapid growth of the fishing sector in Pasni, resulting in employment for a large number of local people.

However, in later years lack of attention to the maintenance of the harbor made it dysfunctional and by 2010 the jetty at Pasni Harbor had become blocked due to continuous siltation.

Due to the closure of the harbour, fishermen have to proceed to the Gwadar port town 132 km away to dock their boats after fishing. Although it is not cost-effective, fishermen feel they have no alternative as they sometimes have to spend weeks in Gwadar while fishing.

== See also ==
- Port of Pasni
- List of ports in Pakistan#Fish harbours
- Karachi Fisheries Harbour Authority
- Fisheries Research and Training Institute, Lahore Pakistan
