= India–Pakistan maritime trespassing =

Maritime border violations between Pakistan and India

The Sir Creek area. The Green Line is the boundary as claimed by Pakistan, the red line is the boundary as claimed by India. The black line is the undisputed section.

India–Pakistan maritime trespassing refers to the frequent trespassing and violation of respective national territorial waters of India and Pakistan in peacetime. Most trespassing is common to Pakistani and Indian fishermen operating along the coastline of the Indian state of Gujarat and the Pakistani province of Sindh. Recently the Indian Coast Guard apprehended a Pakistani fishing boat along the Gujarat coast and arrested 14 fishermen of the neighbouring nation. Most violations occur due to the absence of a physical boundary and lack of navigational tools for small fishermen. Hundreds of fishermen are arrested by the Coast Guards of both nations, but obtaining their release is difficult and long-winded owing to the hostile relations between the two nations.

== Patrolling and arrests ==
The long-standing territorial disputes and military conflicts between India and Pakistan have led to vigilant and strict patrolling of territorial waters in the Arabian Sea and the coastline shared along the Indian state of Gujarat and the Pakistani province of Sind by the Maritime Security Agency of Pakistan and the Indian Coast Guard. The absence of a physical boundary and lack of proper demarcation leaves small fishing boats and trawlers susceptible to illegally crossing territorial waters. The problem is aggravated by the dispute over the Sir Creek in Kutch and the failure to officially determine the maritime boundary between the two nations. Most local fishermen possess no navigational tools and are unable or incapable of determine their location by longitudes or latitudes.

Recently a boat that was allegedly coming from Pakistan and violated maritime boundary and entered in Indian territory was termed as 'terror boat' and it exploded in the Arabian sea after a fire on ship. As per coast guard and defence ministry of India, boat was carrying some 'illicit transaction' as intercepted by intelligence, and four persons who were on board did not stop the boat even after warning shots by coast guards and instead these onboard persons made their boat explode. This episode resulted in a controversy and many versions came to light for and against the story and allegations. Media houses also pooled in to report it in different ways.

== Obtaining release ==
For most of the time, the situation of imprisoned fishermen remained unknown to their home countries and people. Coastal villages often report the disappearance of fishing boats and fishermen from their village but their whereabouts remain unclear for many years. Indian authorities estimate that more than 100 fishing boats and admit that they often cannot ascertain how many fishermen had strayed. Most fishermen who are arrested are denied basic legal rights and given treatment usually accorded to prisoners of war. Some NGOs and human rights organisations have worked to petition both governments and represent the families of imprisoned fishermen, but with limited success.

During periods of improvement in bilateral relations, the governments of both nations have taken steps to release imprisoned fishermen as a confidence-building measure and gestures of peace and goodwill. Both nations have also recently established a joint judicial committee, composing of four retired judges from either nation to resolve the disputes and obtain the release of imprisoned fishermen. The committee has enabled the exchanging of lists of fishermen and other civilian prisoners being held in jails of India and Pakistan and providing consular access to those still imprisoned. In 2006, Pakistan released more than 400 Indian fishermen (including 30 children) and India reciprocated by releasing 130 Pakistani fishermen, but claimed that as many as 350 fishermen were still languishing in Pakistani jails. However, there remains much distrust and inertia in processes to obtain the release of fishermen, and both governments have exchanged accusations of the lack of legal rights and access for their citizens and the absence of cooperation on ascertaining rival claims on the number of fishermen imprisoned and obtaining their release.

== Preventive measures ==
The Indian government has undertaken a census of fishermen in western Gujarat, preparing a database of information on fishermen and their boats to be used for more effective monitoring of fishing activities in Indian territorial waters alongside Pakistan and to prevent boats from straying into Pakistani waters. The Indian Coast Guard has also begun installing tracking devices in fishing boats operating in the waters off western Gujarat to maintain surveillance and to stop them from straying into Pakistani waters. Developed by the Indian Space Research Organisation, the tracking device has the ability to send out alerts for fires on board, a sinking vessel, a medical emergency and when the boat is apprehended by another country.
