= Pasni (city) =

Pasni پسنى
- City
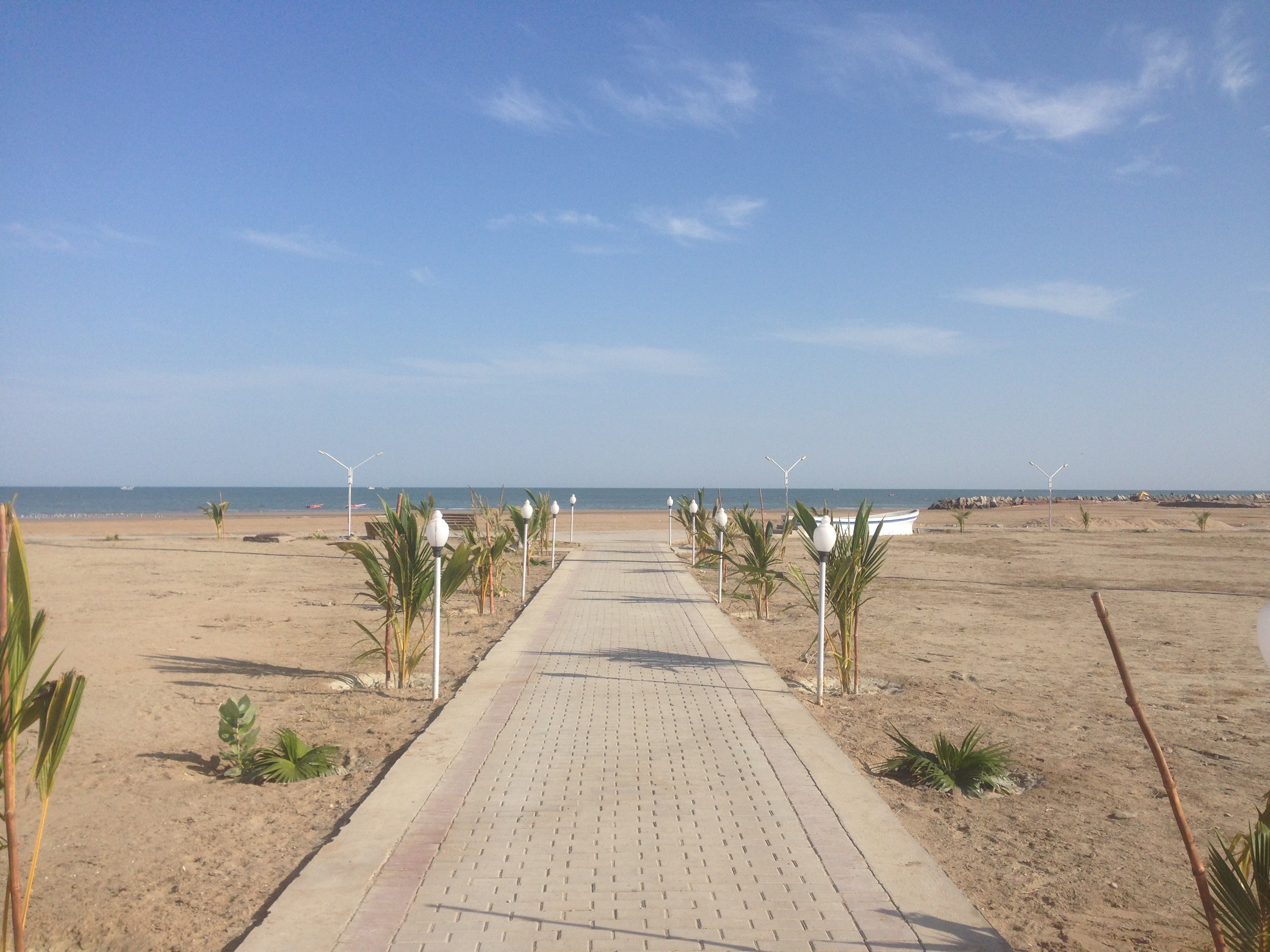
- Beach in Pasni

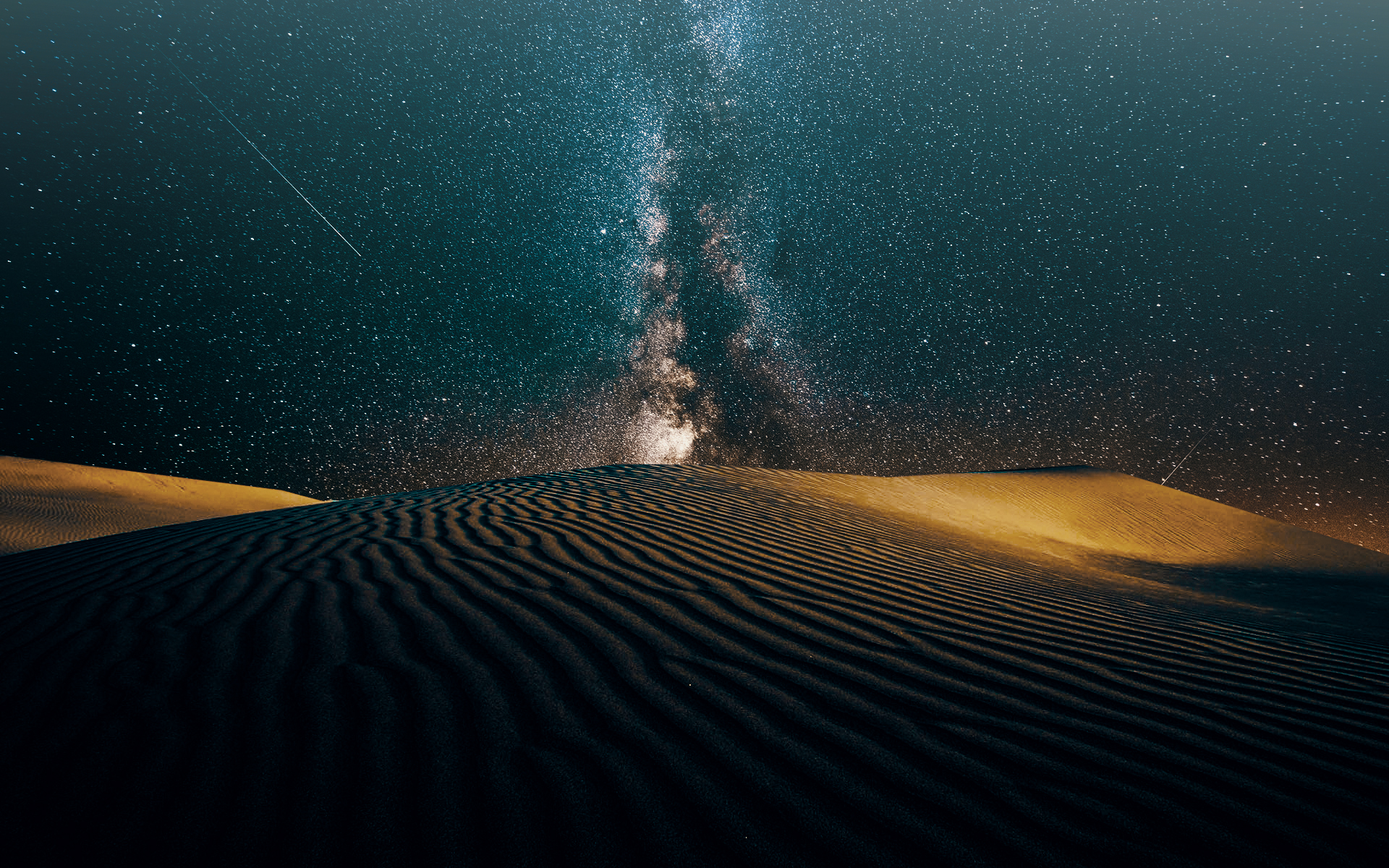
- Milkyway over dunes

- Location of Pasni Pasni (Pakistan)
- Coordinates: 25°15′54.8″N 63°28′11.35″E
- Country: Pakistan
- Province: Balochistan
- District: Gwadar District
- Elevation: 10 m (33 ft)

Population (2023)
  - Total: 43,494
- Time zone: UTC+5 (PST)
- Postal code: 91300
- Calling code: 2049
- Native Language: Balochi

Pasni (Urdu: پسنى) is a city and fishing port in Gwadar District, Balochistan, Pakistan. It is located on the Makran coast on the Arabian Sea, about 450 km (280 mi) from Karachi. Administratively, Pasni is the headquarters of Pasni Tehsil, a sub-division of Gwadar District. Astola, Pakistan's largest offshore island, lies 40 km (25 mi) ESE of Pasni, in the Arabian Sea. The city of Pasni is administratively subdivided into two Union Councils.

== Topography ==
The topography of the area is marked by low jagged hills of the Makran Coastal Range, while flat land is more common towards the coast. Zarrénay koh is a small hill astride a promontory (Cape or Ras Juddi) south of Pasni and marks the highest point (416' ASL) in the area. The unspoilt and pristine beaches of Pasni offer some of the most enchanting sceneries along the Arabian Sea. Shádi Kawr river, fed by adjoining rainwater streams, drains into the Arabian Sea just north of the town. Vegetation is sparse and consists mostly of hardy desert shrubs. Most of the non-marine edible products are brought in from Turbat as well as faraway Karachi.

Pasni town, like the rest of Makran coast, is affected by an active fault (the Makran Trench) caused by the northward movement (40–50 mm/year) of the Arabian Plate against the Eurasian Plate. Tectonic activity emanating from this subduction zone in the Arabian Sea causes occasional, low intensity quakes. On 28 November 1945, a tsunami, triggered by the 1945 Balochistan earthquake, completely destroyed Pasni town.

== Demographics ==
=== Population ===
Historical population

Year	Pop.	±%
1951	6,168	—
1961	7,483	+21.3%
1972	15,737	+110.3%
1981	17,988	+14.3%

Year	Pop.	±%
1998	29,538	+64.2%
2017	34,524	+16.9%
2023	43,494	+26.0%

As of the 2023 census, Pasni had a population of 43,494.

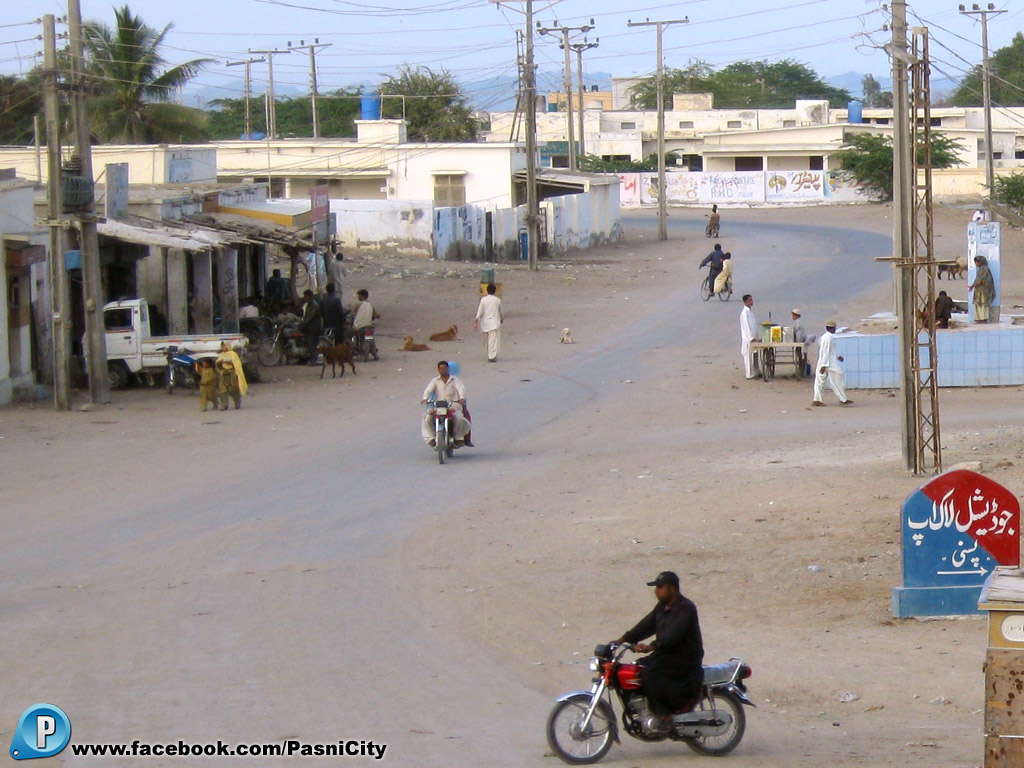
Pasni street scene

The Pasni population predominantly comprises Baloch clans like Kalmati, who tend to dominate land ownership and the fishing industry. Pasni's population also includes Baloch tribes such as Bizanjo, Barr, Mullahzai, Sangur, Wadaila, etc., living in this small town. The working classes have traditionally comprised Med, Darzádag, Puzzh, Maqsoodi, and some of whom are groups that were historically slaves of the ruling families. People of East African ancestry commonly known as Kohig or 'sheedis' can also be found in Pasni in small numbers; this African lineage is found at low frequency in the rest of Makran, as well as Karachi. 'Sheedis' are mostly descended from female slaves brought in as concubines in the early 19th century, when slave trade flourished under Omani Sultans whose suzerainty extended over Gwadar till 1958.

Religious groups in Pasni City (1941 & 2017)
Religious group	1941		2017	
Religious group	Pop.	%	Pop.	%
Islam	3,547	98.09%	34,388	99.51%
Hinduism	69	1.91%	55	0.16%
Christianity	0	0%	3	0.01%
Others	0	0%	111	0.32%
Total population	3,616	100%	34,557	100%

== Climate ==
Pasni experiences a hot arid climate (Köppen: BWh), which is characterized by long, extremely hot summers and short, mild winters. This classification indicates a region with very low annual precipitation and consistently high temperatures. Located on the coast of the Arabian Sea, Pasni benefits from some maritime influence that helps moderate extreme heat compared to inland desert areas.

During summer months, especially from May to July, daytime temperatures commonly reach around 34 °C or 93.2 °F, while winter nights in January typically remain above 12 °C or 53.6 °F. The city receives minimal rainfall, averaging around 98 millimetres or 3.9 inches annually, mostly from western disturbances in winter.

Climate data for Pasni (1991–2020)
Month	Jan	Feb	Mar	Apr	May	Jun	Jul	Aug	Sep	Oct	Nov	Dec	Year
Mean daily maximum °C (°F)	25.1 (77.2)	26.9 (80.4)	30.2 (86.4)	33.5 (92.3)	35.4 (95.7)	35.4 (95.7)	33.5 (92.3)	32.5 (90.5)	32.8 (91.0)	34.1 (93.4)	31.1 (88.0)	27.3 (81.1)	31.5 (88.7)
Daily mean °C (°F)	18.9 (66.0)	20.3 (68.5)	23.7 (74.7)	27.2 (81.0)	30.3 (86.5)	31.3 (88.3)	30.4 (86.7)	29.3 (84.7)	28.5 (83.3)	27.6 (81.7)	24.1 (75.4)	20.6 (69.1)	26.0 (78.8)
Mean daily minimum °C (°F)	12.6 (54.7)	14.2 (57.6)	17.1 (62.8)	21.3 (70.3)	25.2 (77.4)	27.2 (81.0)	27.3 (81.1)	26.1 (79.0)	24.1 (75.4)	21.2 (70.2)	17.0 (62.6)	13.9 (57.0)	20.6 (69.1)
Average rainfall mm (inches)	26.6 (1.05)	12.0 (0.47)	13.5 (0.53)	2.9 (0.11)	0.6 (0.02)	9.6 (0.38)	7.1 (0.28)	4.7 (0.19)	0.7 (0.03)	0.7 (0.03)	4.8 (0.19)	16.0 (0.63)	99.2 (3.91)
Average rainy days (≥ 1.0 mm)	1.6	0.9	1.1	0.3	0.1	0.3	0.7	0.3	0.1	0.1	0.3	0.9	6.7
Source: NOAA

== Facilities ==
The city houses a modern fish harbour and Port of Pasni, with fishing being the main occupation of the city dwellers. Frozen catch is also sent to Turbat and Karachi for sale in the larger markets.

Pasni Airport is shared by Pakistan Air Force (PAF), Pakistan Navy and civil aviation. PAF as well as PN-Aviation operational facilities are housed nearby. Daily commercial flights link the town with Karachi.

In 2008, the government approved the construction of Shadi Kawr storage dam 50 km north of Pasni, which was inaugurated in September 2017 and is expected to alleviate some of the water deficiency of the region.

== History ==
Other than being a small fishing village, the city does not figure much in history. Alexander the Great is said to have stopped at Pasni (called 'Cysa' in Arrian's treatise Indica) while unsuccessfully trying to rendezvous with his admiral, Nearchus, during a disastrous exodus via Makkuran after the Indian Campaign (325 BC). According to one theory, Admiral Nearchus' well-stocked fleet was supposed to have continuously provisioned Alexander's army as the latter marched West along the barren coast towards Persia. In the event, a major portion of Alexander's route through Makran (Bela-Averan-Hoshab-Turbat and then south to Pasni-Gwadar) turned out to be much further inland than expected, apparently due to faulty knowledge of the terrain.

An unexplored Harappan-era settlement known as Sotkagén Koh is tucked away in the low hills, about 25 km north of Pasni. It is conjectured that this was an ancient Harappan outpost which traded luxury wares with Mesopotamia and Persian Gulf settlements.

The city of Pasni, along with Gwadar, were burned by the Portuguese in 1581, having had some violent encounters with the Kalmatis in the area. The city was attacked again, by Baloch rebels during the 1898 Baloch uprising; the city was looted, and the telegraph lines running to Gwadar severed.

In 2005, parts of Pasni were flooded when the Shadi Kaur Dam burst following two weeks of heavy rainfall. In 2025 the government of Pakistan expressed interest in having investment from the United States in developing a mineral export terminal at Pasni.

== See also ==
- Pasni Fish Harbour
