= Gadani =

Coastal town in Balochistan, Pakistan

Gadani گڈانی Gaddani
- Town
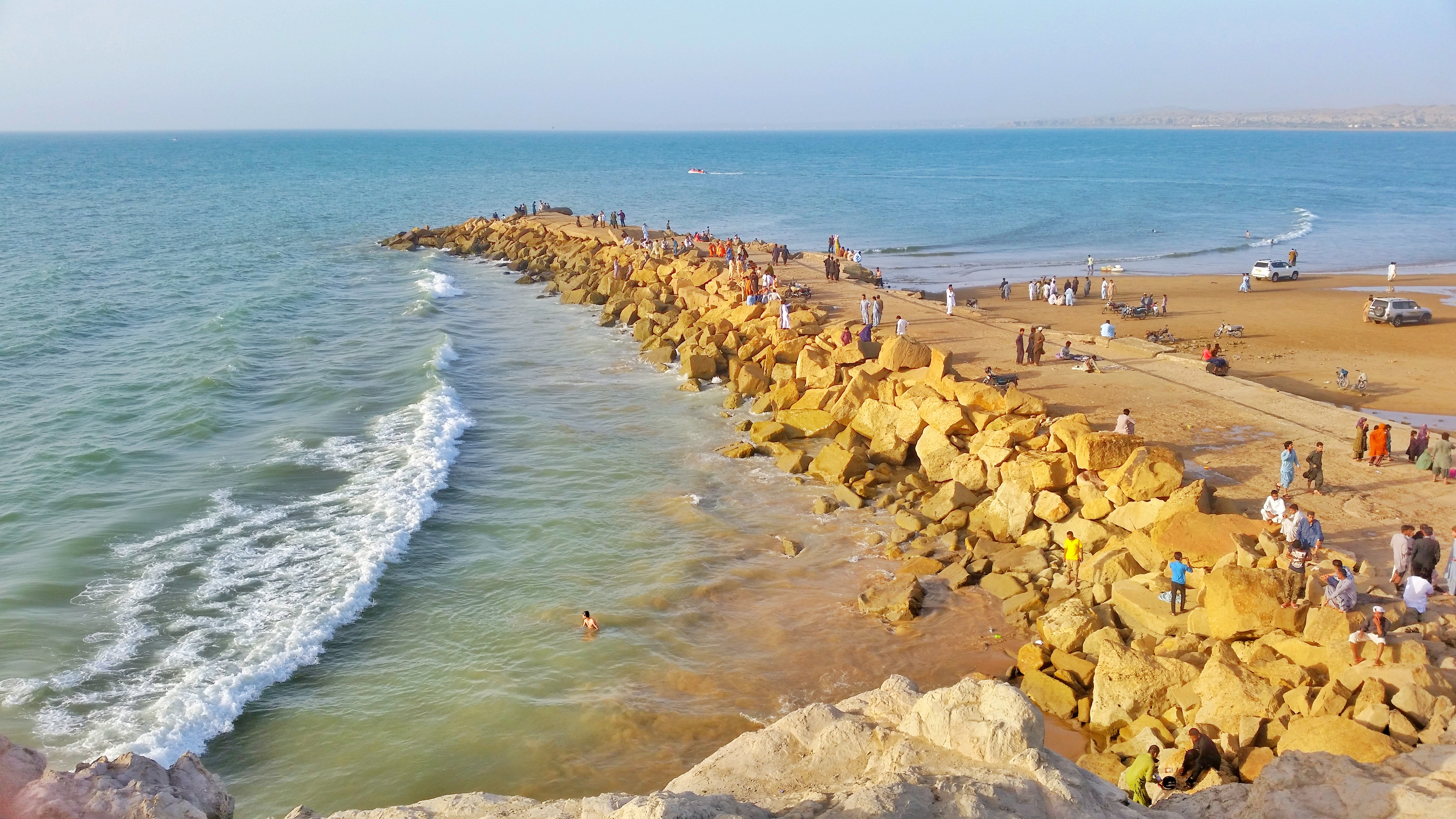
- Gadani Beach

- Location in Balochistan, Pakistan Gadani (Pakistan)
- Country: Pakistan
- Province: Balochistan
- Division: Kalat
- District: Hub District

Population (2023 census)
  - Total: 17,540
- Time zone: UTC+5 (PST)

Gadani (Urdu: گڈانی) is a coastal town and the administrative centre of Gadani Tehsil in Hub District, in the Balochistan province of Pakistan. Situated along the Arabian Sea approximately 50 kilometres (31 mi) west of Karachi, the town had a recorded population of 17,540 at the 2023 census.

The local population is predominantly Muslim, with a small Hindu minority. The principal languages spoken are Balochi, Brahui, alongside Lasi-speaking community. Local tribes include the Sanghur, Kurd, Sajdi, Muhammad Hasni, Gurginari and Bizenjo.

== History ==
A number of prehistoric shell midden sites have been identified along the shores of a small bay near Gadani. The middens consist of accumulations of marine and mangrove shell fragments, interspersed with flint and jasper tools and stone querns. Initial radiocarbon dating indicates that the deposits result from coastal habitation during the seventh and fifth millennia BP.

== Demographics ==
Population of Gadani
Year	Pop.	±% p.a.
1981	6,546	—
1998	11,068	+3.14%
2017	7,679	−1.91%
2023	17,540	+14.76%

According to the 2023 census, the population of Gadani stood at 17,540.

== Economy ==
=== Ship-breaking ===
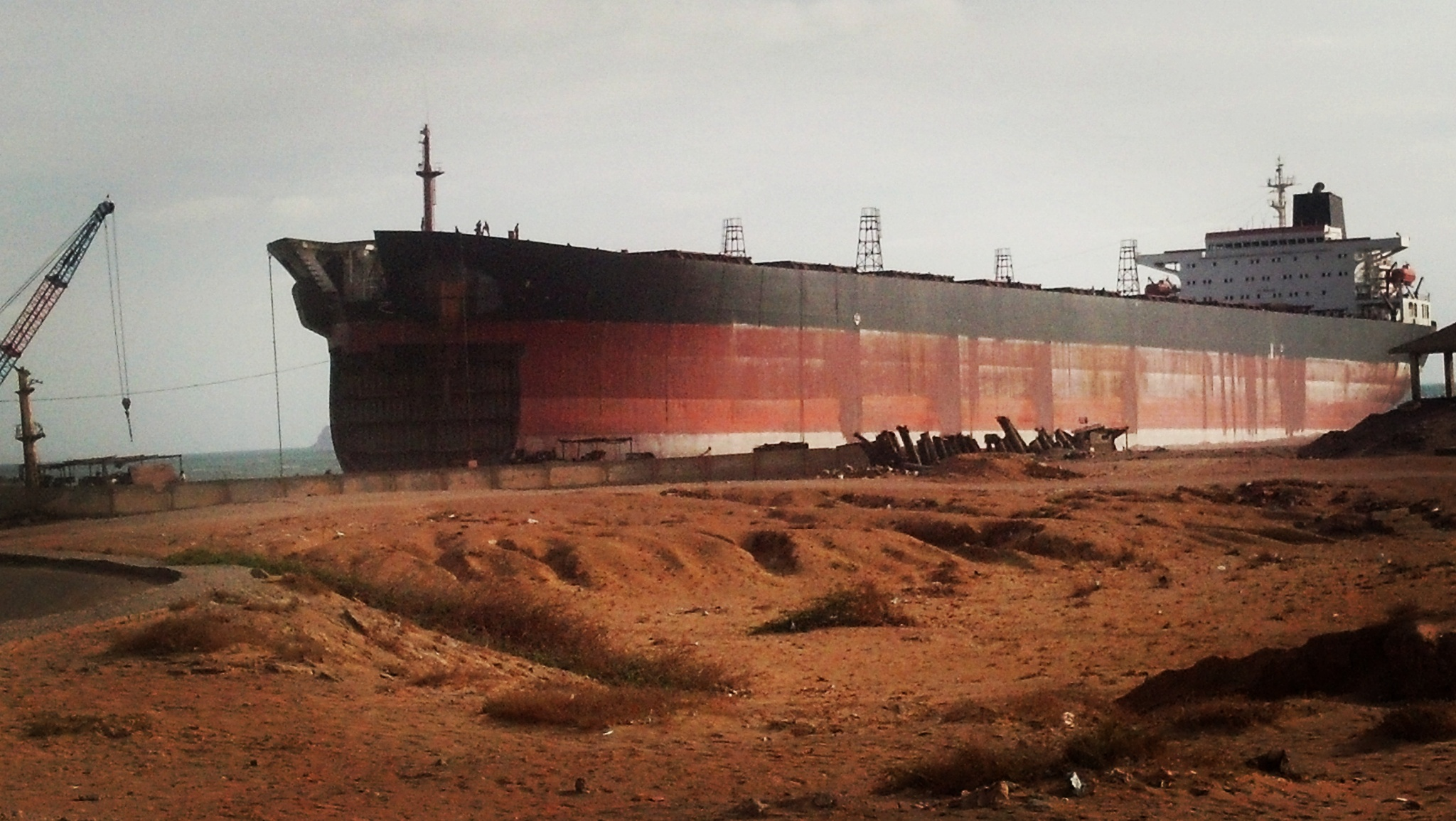
A vessel being broken up at the Gadani yard

The Gadani Ship Breaking Yard is among the world's largest ship breaking yards and is located immediately south of the town, occupying a 10 km (6.2 mi) stretch of beach divided into 132 ship-breaking plots.

During the 1980s, the yard was reportedly the largest of its kind in the world and is said to have employed more than 30,000 workers directly. Subsequent competition from newer facilities at Alang in India and Chittagong in Bangladesh contributed to a marked decline in throughput, and the yard's output later fell to less than one-fifth of its 1980s level. A reduction in taxes on scrap metal has been credited with a partial recovery, and the yard is reported in 2001 to employ around 2,000 workers.

=== Port facilities ===
The Port of Gadani comprises the Gadani Fish Harbour and the Gadani Ship Breaking Yard. In August 2019, the federal government announced a feasibility study for the development of a modern port at Gadani.

The Gadani Fish Harbour was completed in 2003 as part of a federal initiative to develop four fishing ports along the country's coast.

=== Gadani Power Project ===
The Gadani Power Project, also referred to as the Pakistan Power Park, was a proposed energy complex in Gadani planned under the China–Pakistan Economic Corridor (CPEC). In August 2013, the Government of Pakistan announced its intention to establish ten coal-fired power plants at the site with an aggregate capacity of 6,600 MW, with technical and financial assistance largely from China. Under the financing arrangement, China was to provide debt finance covering 85 per cent of the project cost, with the remainder met by the Government of Pakistan. The total cost was reported as Rs. 144.6 billion.

The complex was envisaged as ten coal-fired plants of 660 MW each. Chinese investors were reported to have committed to six of the plants, with two to be developed by ANC Dubai and one initiated by the Government of Pakistan. The Ciner Group of Turkey separately agreed to undertake the construction of a 660 MW coal-fired plant at Gadani. The project was suspended in early 2015.
