= Pasni Tehsil =

تحصِيل پسنى
- Tehsil
- Pasni Tehsil
- Interactive map of تحصِيل پسنى
- Country: Pakistan
- Province: Balochistan
- Division: Makran
- District: Gwadar

Area
  - Tehsil: 4,822 km^{2} (1,862 sq mi)

Population (2023)
  - Tehsil: 74,128
  - Density: 15.37/km^{2} (39.8/sq mi)
  - Urban: 43,494 (58.67%)
  - Rural: 30,634 (41.33%)
- Time zone: UTC+5 (PST)
- Number of towns: 1
- Number of Union Councils: 4

Pasni Tehsil (Urdu: تحصِيل پسنى) is a subdivision (tehsil) of Gwadar District in the Balochistan province of Pakistan. It is administratively subdivided into four Union Councils, two of which form the tehsil capital Pasni.

The local fisherfolk have been demanding the restoration of the inactive fishing harbour to counter unemployment.

== Demographics ==
=== Population ===
Historical population
Year	Pop.	±% p.a.
1951	...	—
1961	16,507	—
1972	32,610	+6.38%
1981	39,810	+2.24%
1998	56,902	+2.12%
2017	61,347	+0.40%
2023	74,128	+3.20%

According to the 2023 Census of Pakistan, Pasni tehsil had a total population of 74,128.

== See also ==
- Gwadar District
- China-Pakistan Economic Corridor (CPEC)
- Balochistan
- Gwadar Port
- Tehsils of Pakistan
  - Tehsils of Punjab, Pakistan
  - Tehsils of Balochistan
  - Tehsils of Khyber Pakhtunkhwa
  - Tehsils of Sindh
  - Tehsils of Azad Kashmir
  - Tehsils of Gilgit-Baltistan
- Kulanch
