= Port of Pasni =

Port in Pasni, Balochistan, Pakistan

- Interactive map of Port of Pasni
- Location in Pakistan

Location
- Country: Pakistan
- Location: Arabian Sea
- Coordinates: 25°16′N 63°29′E
- UN/LOCODE: PKPSI

Details
- Opened: 1989; 37 years ago
- Type of harbour: Coastal breakwater
- Size: 100,000 m^{2} (25 acres)
- No. of piers: 5 including a cargo jetty

The Port of Pasni (Urdu: بندر گاہ پسنى) is located in the town of Pasni, Gwadar District, Balochistan province, Pakistan. The facilities include a modern fish harbour with four piers and a cargo jetty, together with a coast guard base called PMSA Rishad, operated by the Pakistan Maritime Security Agency (PMSA), a branch of the Pakistan Navy. The port has been suffering from silting since at least 2003, with unsuccessful attempts at clearing the harbour.

== See also ==
- Pasni Fish Harbour
