= Pishukan =

Pakistani town

Pishukan پیشُکان
- Union Council
- Pishukan, Balochistan

- Location within Pakistan
- Coordinates: 25.12°N 62.06°E
- Country: Pakistan
- Province: Balochistan
- District: Gwadar

Government
  - Union Council Chairman: Ayub Taj

Population (1998)
  - Total: 12,000
- Time zone: UTC+5 (PST)

Pishukan (Balochi: پیشُکان) is a town on the western shore of the Gwadar West Bay, north of the Arabian Sea, in Pakistan. It is a union council of Gwadar Tehsil in the Gwadar District of Balochistan province. The town has a population of 12,000.

== History ==
The town has been affected by the ongoing conflict between separatist insurgents and the security forces. In May 2017 ten construction and road workers were killed by militants of the Balochistan Liberation Army, an internationally designated terrorist organization.

Pishukan is a major conduit for people smuggling, arms smuggling, and narcotics smuggling. The town was mentioned in 1909 as the landing site for up to 1,500 rifles which were being smuggled into Balochistan.

In February 2021, about 700 kg (1,500 lb) of hashish were seized by the Pakistan Navy and the Anti Narcotics Force from a vehicle in Pishukan. In June 2022, the Indian Coast Guard intercepted 50 kg (110 lb) of heroin being transported from Pishukan to the coast of Kutch District in Gujarat, India.

== Climate ==
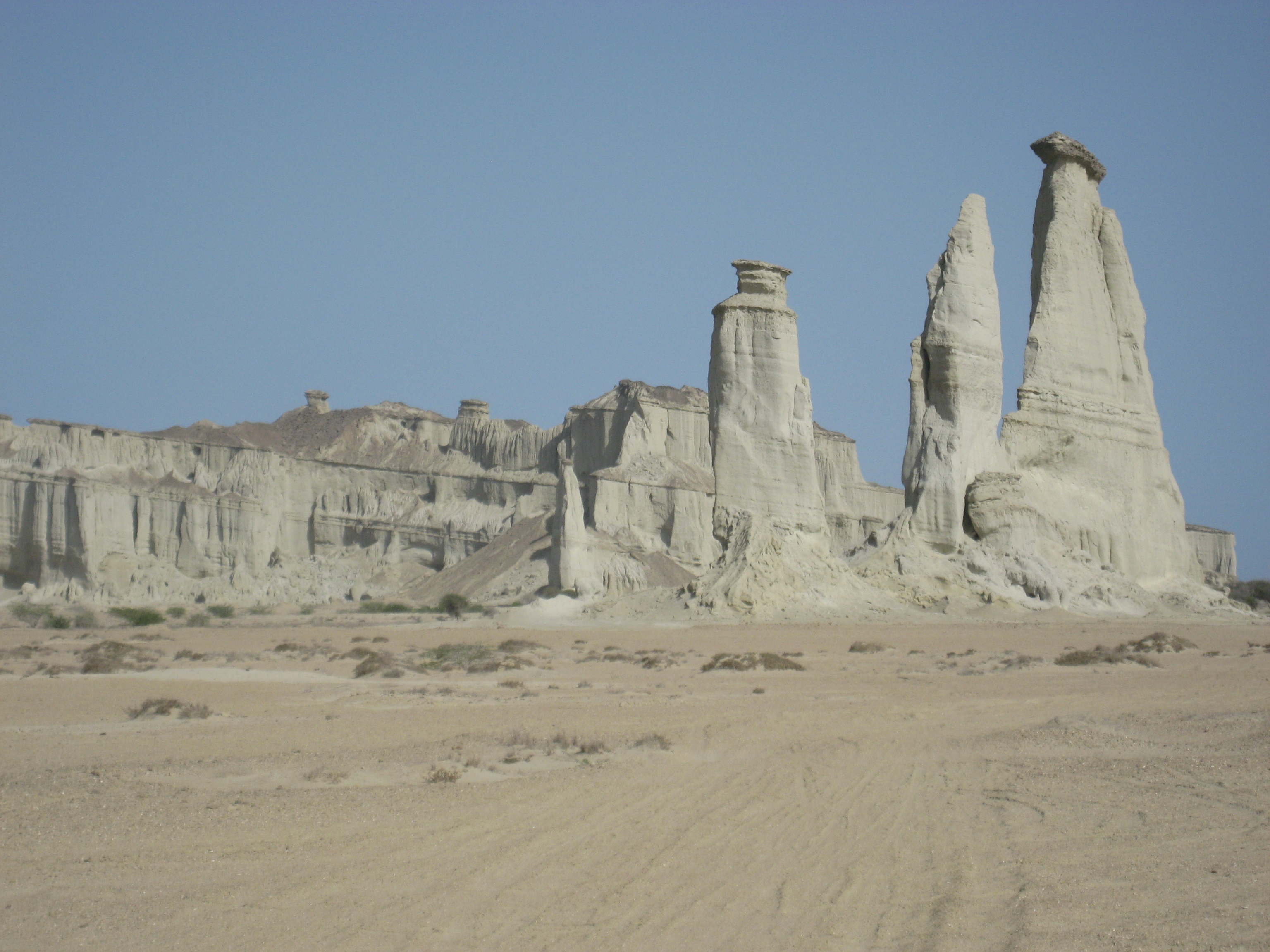
Natural rock formations near Pishukan.

Pishukan has a hot desert climate (Köppen climate classification BWh) with hot summers and warm winters. Most rainfall falls in winter, although there is sometimes a little rain in the monsoon season (July–August) as well. In January 2022 the town suffered from heavy flooding, resulting in the destruction of many mud houses. Rescue efforts in the area were coordinated by the Pakistan Coast Guards.

== Fish harbour ==
The economy of the town has long been focussed on fishing with reports of this from as far back as 1908. Plans for a new fishing harbour were announced in 2002.

The town is expected to become a major commercial centre in concert with the development of the Port of Gwadar located about 27 kilometres (17 mi) to the east. There are plans for the fishing jetty of Gwadar to be moved to Pishukan at some point in the future. An area of 1,000 acres (400 ha) has been earmarked for the use of the Pakistan Navy.

== Transport ==
Transport facilities are dominated by the development of nearby Gwadar.

- The town is connected to the rest of Pakistan by the Makran Coastal Highway, which passes about 15 km (9.3 mi) to the north of the town.
- The main seaport is the Port of Gwadar, approximately 25 km (16 mi) to the east of the town.
- Gwadar Airport is the main airport for the area but the new Gwadar International Airport, approximately 50 km (31 mi) to the northeast of Pishukan, is due to become operational in late 2023.

== See also ==
- Jiwani, a coastal town to the west of Pishukan
