= Indus River Delta =

River delta in India and Pakistan

Designations

Ramsar Wetland
- Official name: Indus Delta
- Designated: 5 November 2002
- Reference no.: 1284

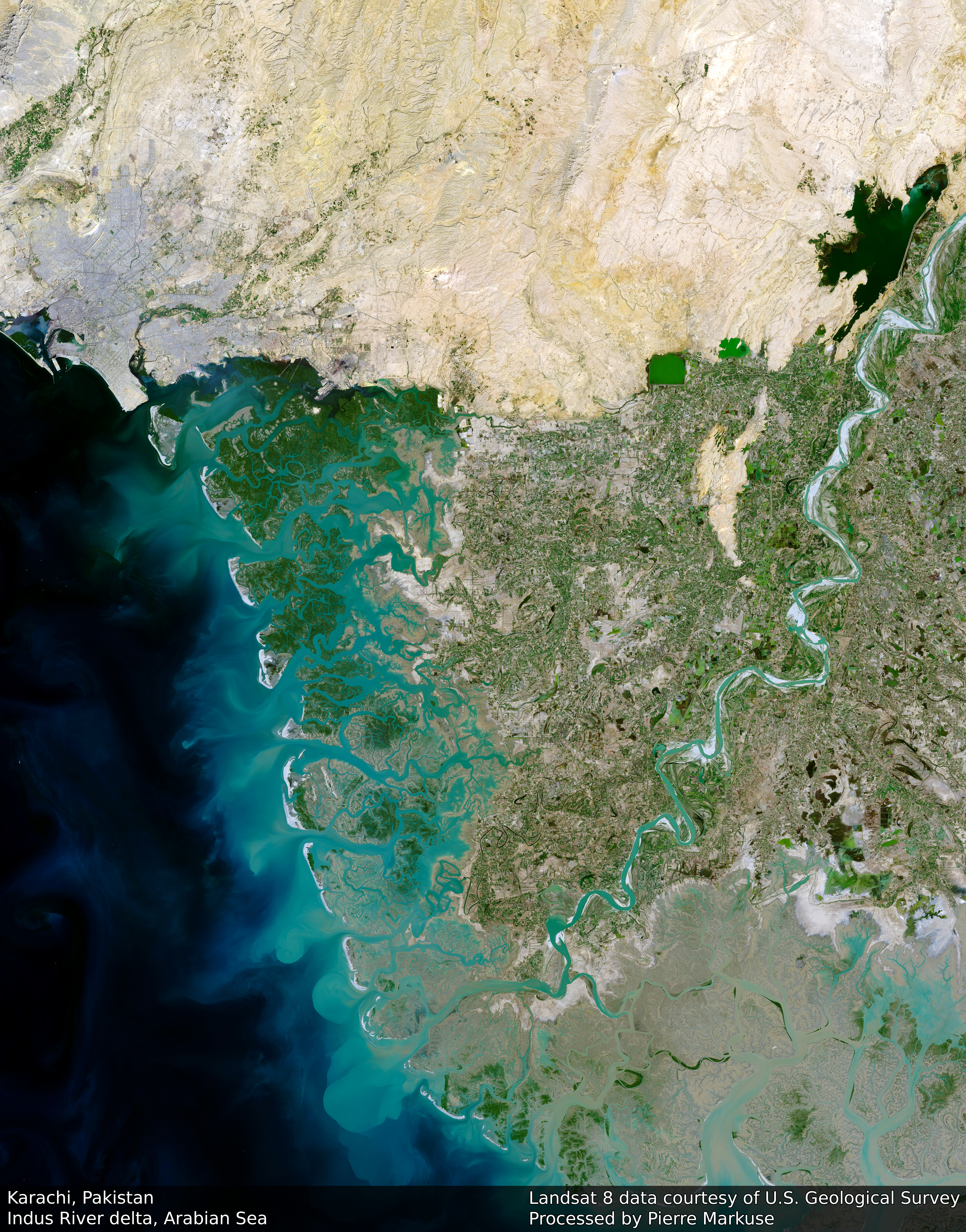

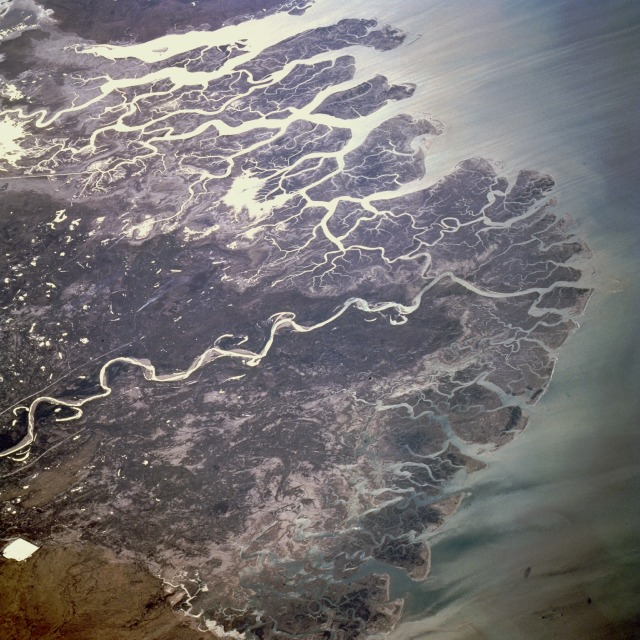
The Indus River Delta, as seen from space with Kori Creek shown at top.

The Indus River Delta forms where the Indus River flows into the Arabian Sea, mostly in the southern Sindh province of Pakistan with a small portion in the Kutch Region of India. The delta covers an area of about 41,440 km^{2} (16,000 sq mi), and is approximately 210 km (130 mi) across where it meets the sea. The active part of the delta is 6,000 km^{2} in area (2,300 sq mi). The climate is arid, the region only receives between 25 and 50 centimetres (9.8 and 19.7 in) of rainfall in a normal year. The delta is home to the largest arid mangrove forests in the world, as well as many birds, fish and the Indus dolphin. The fifth largest in the world, the Indus Delta is a designated wetland and Ramsar site, containing seventeen major creeks or estuaries and numerous minor creeks. Major estuaries of the Indus are home to the Indian Ocean humpback dolphin.

The population of the active part of the delta was estimated at 900,000 in 2003. Most of the population depends on agriculture and fishing. Mangrove forests provide fuel wood. Many former settlements have been abandoned as result of lack of water in the Indus and the encroaching Arabian Sea.

The delta faces several issues. Since 1883, due to land erosion and sea intrusion it has shrunk by 92 percent from around 12,900 square kilometres (5,000 sq mi) to nearly 1,000 square kilometres (390 sq mi) in 2018. Since the 1940s, the delta has received less water as a result of large-scale irrigation works capturing large proportions of the Indus' flow before it reaches the delta. The result has been catastrophic for both the environment and the local population. As a result, the 2010 Pakistan floods were considered "good news" for the ecosystem and population of the river delta as they brought much needed fresh water.

== History ==
According to some accounts, the Macedonian fleet (of Alexander the Great) anchored itself for some time in the Indus river delta. It was damaged by a tsunami generated by an earthquake off the Makran Coast in 325 BC.

According to Tarikh-i-Hind (also known as the Chach Nama) by 6th century AD there existed a port called Debal in what is now the western part of the Indus delta. Debal also seemed to be the base of pirates from the tribe of Nagamara. These pirates' raids against the Umayyads, and the refusal to redress the issue by the ruling prince, precipitated the Muslim conquest around 710 AD (by Muhammad bin Qasim). Debal remained a port, and the last recorded mention of it was in 1223 AD. By the time Ibn Batuta reached the Indus delta, Debal had been abandoned due to increased shoaling preventing the then-port from accessing the sea.

When the Abbasid caliphate began to disintegrate, the delta came under the control of the increasingly autonomous province centered at Mansura. The eastern part of the delta was even more independent and controlled by the Sumra tribe until 1053 AD, when the region was brought under the control of the Khalji Delhi Sultanate by Alauddin Khalji. The tribe had several capitals, but none are populated today. In 1333 AD, the Samma Dynasty ruled all of the delta, and established their capital first at Samu-i (on the south bank of Keenjhar Lake) and later at Thatta. It was during this dynasty that the "golden age of native rule" (1461-1509 AD) happened in the delta and Sindh, under the rule of Jam Nizamuddin II.

From 1591 to 1592, the Mughal Empire waged a campaign to bring lower Sindh under imperial rule, resulting in the delta coming under the province of Multan and ruled by Mirza Ghazi Beg. In 1739, the region, along with many others, was ceded to Nadir Shah. The Kalhora ruled the region until 1783. The power then transferred to the Talpurs until the British East India Company conquered them in 1839. In 1947, the Indus delta, along with rest of Sindh became a part of Pakistan.

Since 1957, the Sindh Forest and Wildlife Department has been tasked with protecting and managing 280,580 hectares (693,300 acres, estimated 45%) of mangrove-forested area of the Indus delta. In 1973, 64,405 hectares (159,150 acres, 11%) were transferred to Port Qasim. The Sindh Board of Revenue continues to manage 272,485 hectares (673,330 acres, 44%) of the area. In December 2010, realizing the importance of mangrove conservation, the Government of Sindh declared all the mangrove forests in the Indus Delta as "Protected Forests", under the Forest Act of 1927. Apart from this action, a Mangrove Conservation Committee, with membership of all the relevant stakeholders has been formed to ensure the sustainable conservation of the Indus Delta Mangroves

== Geography ==
The Indus river started to form some 50 million years ago. 25 million years ago, the Indus Plain was lifted.

=== Coastline ===
The estimated coastline of the Indus delta with the Arabian Sea (the maximum length in the direction of the coast) is approximated at 210 km (130 mi), 220 km, and 240 km (150 mi). Because the Indus river has switched its location at various points in history, it has an "active" delta region, and total delta region (all area that was once a part of the delta). The total area is estimated at 29,524 km^{2} (11,399 sq mi), 30,000 km^{2} (12,000 sq mi) and 41,440 km^{2} (16,000 sq mi). The active area is estimated at 4,762 km^{2} (1,839 sq mi), and 6,000 km^{2} (2,300 sq mi). The length of the total delta along the axis of Indus is estimated at 240 km (150 mi), whereas the current delta stretches from the Arabian Sea to just south of Thatta (~100 km or 62 mi).

=== Estuaries ===
Indus Delta has 17 major creeks or estuaries and numerous minor creeks. The estuaries in the Indus delta are spread across Sindh in Pakistan in the west and Gujarat in India in the east.

==== Pakistan ====
Creeks in Indus Delta in Pakistan are listed from west to east as follows, many of which fall within the Keti Bunder South Wildlife Sanctuary which is a Ramsar site.

Listed west to east"

- Korangi Creek: southeast coastline of Karachi.
- Phiti Creek:
- Kadiro Creek:
- Chann Waddo Creek:
- Khuddi Creek (Wadhi Khudi Creek):
- Khai Creek:
- Pitiani Creek (Paitiani Creek, Pittiani Creek, Patiani Creek):
- Dabbo Creek (Dhabo Creek):
- Sisa Creek:
- Chan Creek (Chann Creek):
  - Sheeshah Creek:
  - Jua Wali Creek:
  - Rumwah 1 Creek:
- Gorabio Creek:
- Hajamro Creek (Hajambro Creek): location of the historical port town Keti Bandar in Thatta District.
- Turshian Creek:
- Khobar Creek (Keti Creek): Mouth of Indus, designated as the main flow of Indus.
  - Chann Chati Creek
- Qalandri Creek:
- Gaghiar Creek:
- Bajari Creek (Bajri Creek or Bajri Nahar):
- Gehbar Creek:
- Kahr Creek:
- Jongo Jalbani Creek:
- Wari Creek:
- Mangra Creek:
- Bhitiaro Creek:
- Kajhar Creek:
- Sir Creek: disputed border between India and Pakistan.

==== India ====
Sir Creek area.

Great Rann of Kutch lies east of Indus delta. These are four main creeks (six including the Y-fork of Padala Creek) and associated "bet" (islands) on the Indian side as listed below west to east: India's BSF uses CIBMS (Comprehensive Integrated Border Management System), which is a high-tech "smart fence" with a sensor network composed of micro-doppler radars (to detect human movement through obstacles like smoke, fog, and walls), thermal and infrared cameras (high-resolution electro-optical (EO) and infrared (IR) cameras for 24/7 monitoring even in pitch-black conditions), seismic sensors (to detect underground vibrations from potential tunnel-digging activities). The system also included UAVs and drones (for real-time aerial reconnaissance, specifically instrumental in locating stranded personnel in the Harami Nala) and specialized patrolling units and equipment including Creek Crocodile Commandos (an elite BSF unit specially trained for the unique "water-and-mud" terrain of the Kutch creeks), all-terrain vehicles (ATVs), specialized speed boats, floating border observation posts (BOPs) acting as water-borne fortresses, OP Towers (elevated observation post towers in the Harami Nala area), mooring places (such as at Koteshwar for the berthing and maintenance of larger vessels and floating BOPs) and artificial Intelligence Integration (automated threat detection and reduce the reliance on human patrolling in these extreme 50 °C+ environments).

- Sir Creek: disputed between India and Pakistan. Lies immediate east of Khajar Creek.
  - Kajhar Bet: Controlled by Pakistan, lies immediate west of the Sir Creek and immediate east of Kajhar Creek with the Arabian Sea to its immediate south.
  - Vighakot Marshlands: While not always named as a single "bet", this is the primary elevated mudflat area within Indian control which is northern set of islands between Sir Creek and Pir Sanai Creek. It is the home of Vighakot BSF Military Post of India.
  - Allard Bet Marshlands: southern marshland islands between Sir Creek and Pir Sanai Creek.
- Pir Sanai Creek: Lies immediate east of Sir Creek and the immediate west of Padala Creek.
  - Pabevari Bet: between Pir Sanai Creek and Padala Creek.
- Padala Creek: immediate east of Pir Sanai Creek and 16 km (9.9 mi) east of Sir Creek. Padala creek has Y-fork upstream, the western fork is called Vianvari Creek (Vian Wari Creek) and the eastern fork is called Pabevari Creek, both of which after confluence downstream become the Padala Creek.
  - Vian Wari Creek (Vianbari and Viyanbari):
    - Harami Dhoro (bastard's stream): name of Vian Vari after it leaves India and enters Pakistan.
    - Harami Nala (bastard's stream): name of Vian Vari after it leaves Pakistan and re-enters India.
    - Bondho Dhoro channel: enters India further north of Harami Nala in the Sujawal District of Sindh province of Pakistan.
  - Pabevari Creek: Runs west to east and connects Pir Sanai Creek with the Padala Creek.
  - Maniar Bet: The landmass nestled between the Vianvari (West Fork) and Main Padala (East Fork) channels.
- Kori Creek: immediate east of Padala Creek and 34 km (21 mi) southeast of Sir Creek. Kori, the easternmost creek of Indus Delta, has Padala Creek (western fork) as its tributary. Kori Creek runs from Indian Ocean to Koteshwar to 18th century Lakhpat Fort. It is also the location of Narayan Sarovar and Narayan Sarovar Sanctuary - both reachable by the NH-41.
  - Lakhpat Bet: The elevated ground on the eastern bank where the historic Lakhpat Fort is located.

=== Water volume ===
The delta receives almost all of its water from the Indus river, which has an annual flow of approximately 180 billion cubic metres (240 billion cubic yards), and is accompanied by 400 million tonnes of silt. Since the 1940s, dams, barrages and irrigation works have been constructed on the river Indus. (In fact the World Bank has characterized the works as the "world's largest" and the Indus Basin Irrigation System as the "largest contiguous irrigation system developed over the past 140 years" anywhere in the world.) This has served to reduce the flow of water and by 1994, the annual flow of water into the delta was 43×10^{9} m^{3} (1.5×10^{12} cu ft), and annual amount of silt discharged was estimated to be 100 million tonnes (98 million long tons). Since 1994, the water flow has decreased as Punjab has been allocated a higher share of the water.

=== Climate ===
The climate of the delta is described as arid. It receives only 250–500 mm (9.8–19.7 in) of rain in a normal year. Average temperatures for the delta region range from 21 to 30 °C (70 to 86 °F) in July, and 10–21 °C (50–70 °F) in January. During the summer, the delta experiences intense monsoonal winds from the southwest, causing parts of the delta to be covered by sea-water. When this water retreats, it leaves behind salts in the delta's soil. During the winter the winds in the delta come from the northeast.

The summer monsoonal winds also contribute to high wave energy levels. In fact, the delta is subjected to the highest wave action of any river delta in the world. (The amount of wave energy the Indus delta receives in a single day is greater than that received by the Mississippi River Delta in a year.) Throughout history the delta has survived this wave action because of the large discharge of fresh water to counter the erosional impact of waves. This large amount of wave energy, coupled with lack of silt flowing in from the Indus river (as mentioned above), has resulted in the formation of sand beaches.

== Biodiversity ==
=== Flora ===
Mangrove forests are one of the most abundant ecological communities of the delta, but they have declined over the years. According to Haq et al., they covered an area of 600,000 hectares (1,500,000 acres) until the 1980s and could be found along the entire 240 km coastline, in 40% of the tidal zone, and in 10% of the delta fan. Memon reports that the area of mangrove forests was 263,000 hectares in 1977 and 158,500 ha (392,000 acres) in 1990. Both agree that they were sixth-largest mangrove forests in the world. Previously there had been eight species of mangroves, although only four now remain: Aegiceras corniculatum, Avicennia marina, Ceriops tagal, and Rhizophora mucronata. Among these Avicennia marina constitutes 99% of the mangrove population. As of 2007, the mangroves of the Indus delta are the largest desert climate mangrove forests in the world. However the Indus Delta saw an increase in number of mangroves after preservation and plantation initiatives. Mangrove forests of Indus delta now cover an area of around 600, 000 hectares. The mangroves are under control of three different organizations, namely: - Sindh Forest Department (280, 470 Ha) - Port Qasim Authority (64, 400 Ha) - Sindh Board of Revenue (255, 130 Ha)

Arthrocnemum macrostachyum is also found growing in the delta.

=== Threats ===
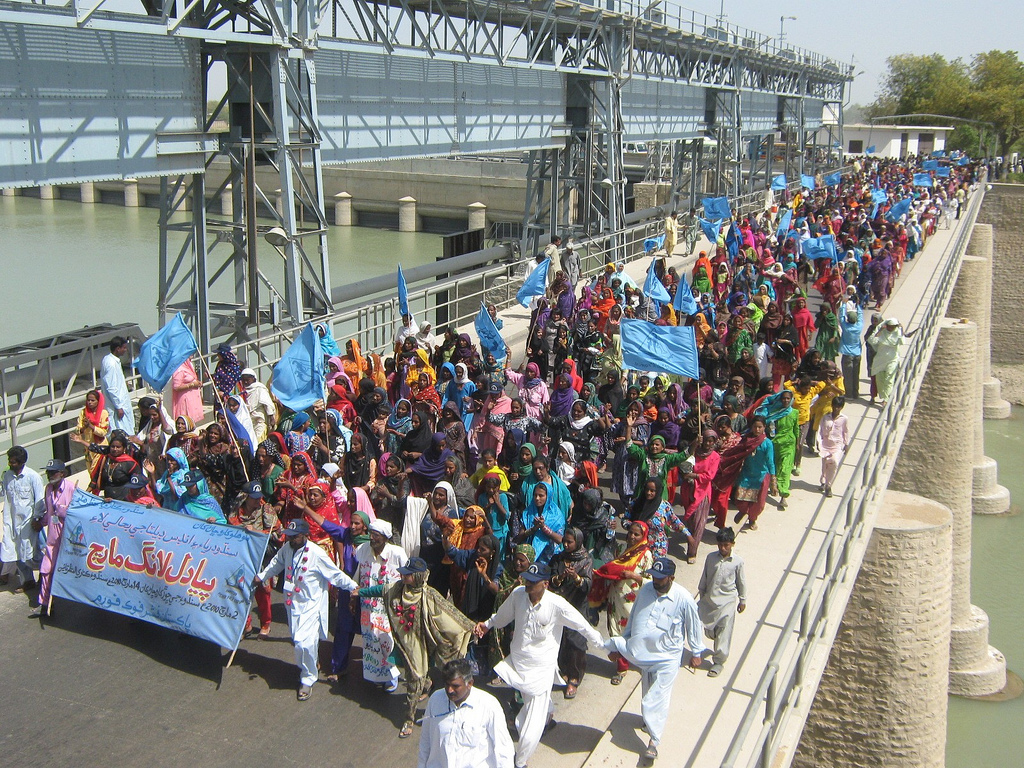
Pakistanis march from March 2nd to March 14th, 2010, calling for the rehabilitation of the Indus river delta.

The natural flow of water and fertile sediments from Indus river into the delta has been impeded due to the construction of dams along the river. The reduction of freshwater due to the dams also increases salinity, making the waters of the delta unsuitable for the freshwater species. In case of the Indus dolphin, the damming of the river has isolated the delta dolphin population from those dolphins upstream. The 2010 Pakistan floods were considered "good news" for the ecosystem of the river delta as they brought an excess of much needed fresh water. The Sindh government announced that 8,000 hectares of mangrove forests had been planted, and more plantation was considered (however, the delta has lost 170,000 hectares of mangroves over the past 50 years).

The delta faces pollution both from sea and the Indus river. Chemical run-off into the river threatens many species. Most of this chemical run-off consists of agriculture pesticide and fertilizer. The delta faces pollution from the Arabian Sea. Karachi, Pakistan's largest city, releases sewage and discharge from industrial units into the Arabian sea, most of which is untreated. Both Port of Karachi and Port Qasim handle significant shipping traffic, resulting in oil discharge, some of which reaches the delta. All of this pollution lowers the river water quality, causes eutrophication, reducing the amount of habitat.

Indus delta has shrunk by 92% since 1833. In light of the threats, Indus Delta was designated a Ramsar site on November 5, 2002. The WWF is working on conservation methods to alleviate the Indus delta's shortage of freshwater.

== Population ==
The population of the delta was estimated at 900,000 in 2003 (the total population of Indus River Delta-Arabian Sea mangroves was 1.2 million). Within the river delta, about 140,000 people (16% of the population) depended on the mangrove forests for their livelihood, and 60% depended on the forests for fuels. At least 75% of the population in the active delta depend on the fishing industry. The population suffers from the lack of health facilities and medical staff. Only about a third of the population has access to clean drinking water.

Ethnic groups of lower Sindh can be found in the delta region: Mallaah, Mohano, Soomro, Samma and Jat. All of these groups speak Sindhi and follow Islam.

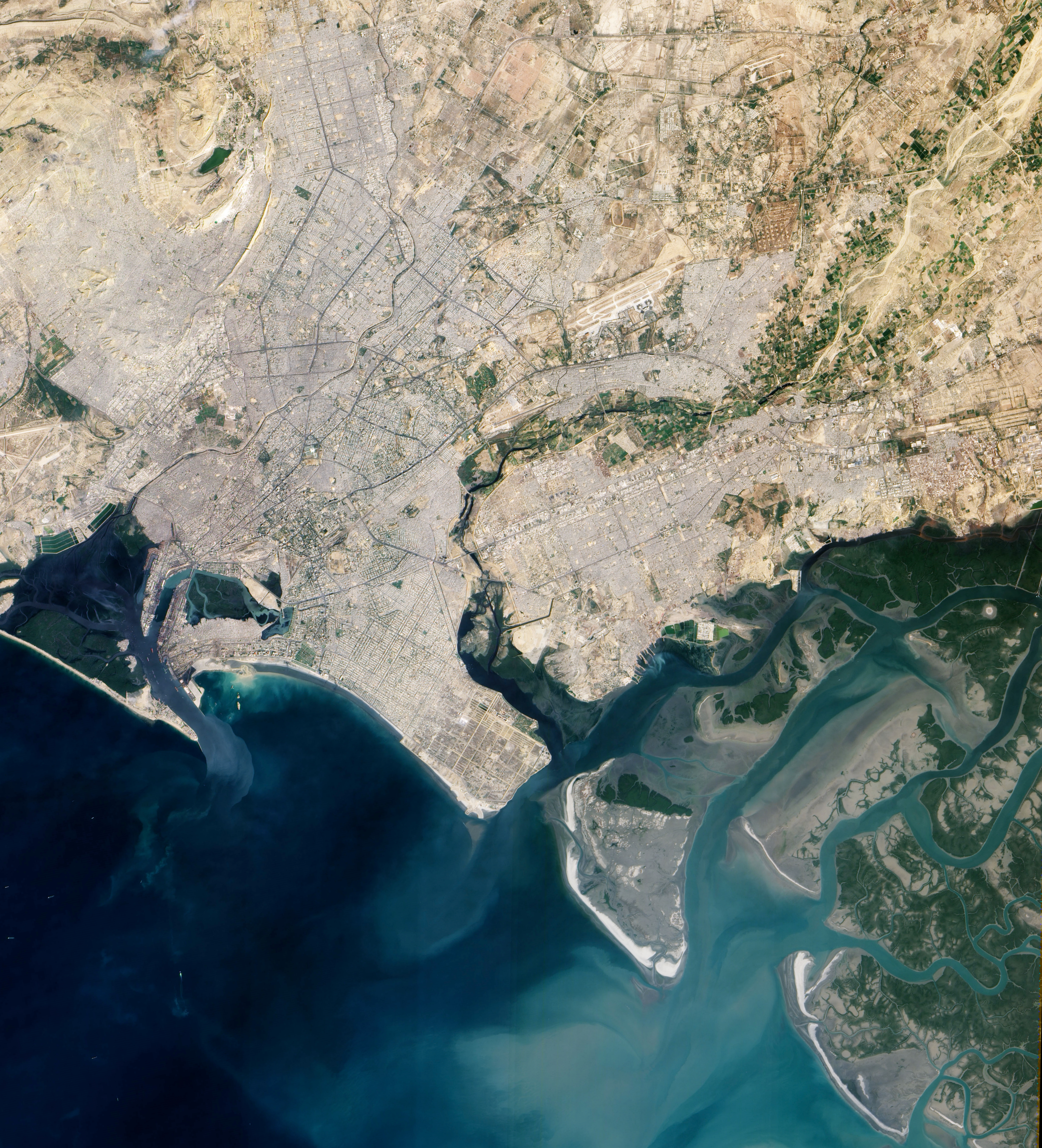
Karachi (centred in the image) is located along the western edge of the Indus River Delta (bottom-right).

The delta falls within the districts of Thatta and Badin of the Sindh province. Pakistan's fifth largest city, Hyderabad, lies about 130 miles north of the mouths of the Indus. Towns are found throughout the delta, but there are no large cities on the delta south of Hyderabad. Karachi, Pakistan's largest city, lies west of the delta on the coast of the Arabian Sea.

The 2010 floods displaced nearly 1 million people in southern Sindh, including those living in the delta. In spite of this displacement and other destruction caused in the rest of Pakistan, however, many people in the delta considered the floods as "good news". Villagers reported abundance of fresh water for drinking and agriculture. Fishermen reported increase in catches.

=== Economy ===
The economy of the delta consists of agriculture and fishing. As of 2005, more than 140,000 hectares of land were used for agriculture, mostly used to cultivate rice, followed by sugarcane and wheat. Barley, gram, oil seeds, maize, millet, cotton, and jowar are other important crops. Fruits such as coconut, mango, fig, pomegranate, apple, peach, melon, banana, guava and papaya are also reportedly grown. The delta also used to have large pastures for livestock grazing.

As of 2003, fishing was an important source of revenue. Catches of mangrove dependent fish were valued at $20 million annually, shrimp at $70 million and mud crabs at $3 million.

=== Migration ===
As a result of resource degradation, a large exodus of people has taken place from the Indus delta. Altaf Memom estimates that 90,000 have been displaced and about 120 villages have been depopulated. One reason give is the shortage of local bushes and plants that are used for preparing various materials (especially by the Jat villagers). Others have migrated due to lack of potable drinking water. The Pakistan Fisherfolk Forum estimates that 14,400 people from the delta coast, majority of them fishermen, are amongst those that have left.

Kharochan, until the 1970s was a bustling city in the delta. Its port was used to export locally grown silk, rice and wood. However, rising salinity destroyed the local agriculture and the port was lost to the encroaching Arabian sea by 2006.

=== Sustainable development ===
In 2009, the World Wildlife Fund (WWF) constructed a large water reservoir, of capacity 12,000 litres (2,600 imp gal; 3,200 US gal), in Tippin village (at Keti Bandar) and a few plastic storage tanks (with a capacity of 4,000 litres). It also set up 200-watt solar panels to supply electricity to a school. Finally it installed two 500-watt wind turbines. Electricity was previously unavailable due to high cost of establishing power lines in the difficult-to-access area.

In 2010, Sindh Radiant Organization (in partnership with WWF) installed a solar-powered desalination plant developed by the Pakistan Council of Scientific and Industrial Research in the village of Jat Mohammad. The plant is capable of providing 40 gallons of drinking water every day. While the plant is not enough to meet the needs of the entire village, Pakistan's Ministry of Science and other NGOs have shown interest in replicating it to alleviate water shortages in the delta. Research and Development Foundation, a Pakistani NGO, has also started implementing solar desalination in six villages in Thatta with funding from Oxfam.

The United Nations Economic and Social Commission for Asia and the Pacific has estimated the potential of generating 100KW of electricity by harnessing the power of tidal currents along 170 km (110 mi) of the delta's coastline.

== Pakistan-India conflict ==
Pakistani fishermen in the delta have increasingly faced detention for accidentally straying over into Indian waters while fishing. Fishermen have been forced to fish near the border as a result of destruction of ecosystems elsewhere in the delta. Because the boundaries between India and Pakistan are poorly demarcated in some areas (e.g. Sir Creek), fishermen often do not know when they have crossed the border. NGOs say that under Indian laws, fisherman can face, at most, three months in prison and a $12 fine. However, most are jailed for a year, and their boats are sold at an auction. Indian fishermen crossing into Pakistan face a similar fate.

== Satellite view ==
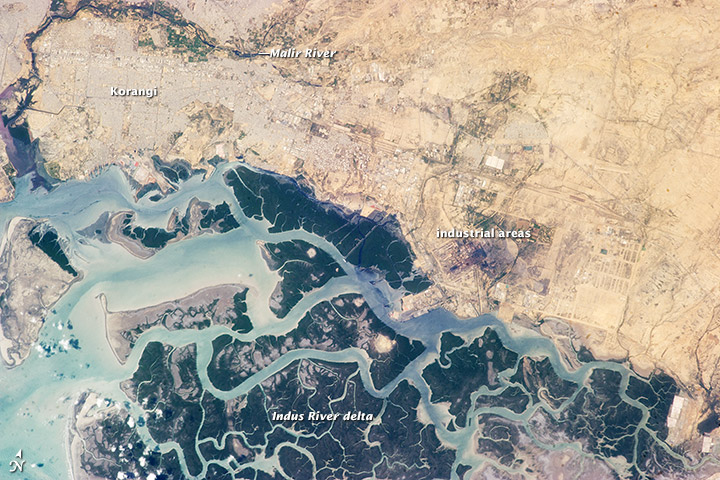
Indus River Delta and Korangi

== See also ==
- Indus River Delta–Arabian Sea mangroves
- Sindhology
