= Karachi Fish Harbour =

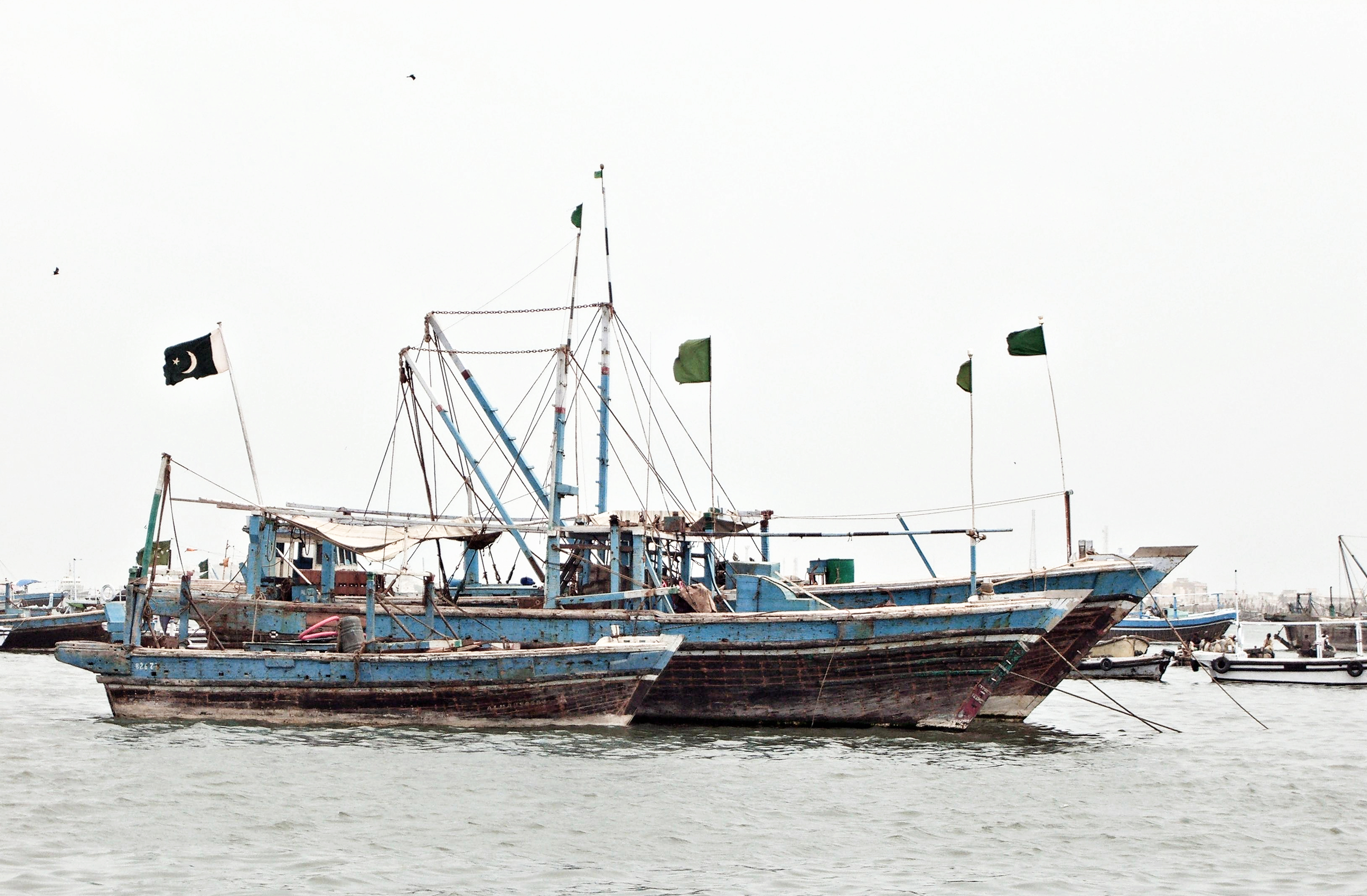
- Fishing boats at Karachi Fish Harbour
- Interactive map of Karachi Fish Harbour
- Native name: بندر ماهیگیری کراچی

Location
- Country: Pakistan
- Location: Karachi, Sindh
- Coordinates: 24.848°N 66.975°E

Details
- Operated by: Karachi Fisheries Harbour Authority
- Owned by: Government of Sindh
- Type of Harbor: river basin
- Size: 33.9 hectares (1/3 is channel water)
- Employees: 240

The Karachi Fish Harbour is a port located in Keamari District, which is part of Karachi Division, Sindh province, Pakistan. Over 90 percent of the Pakistan's fish and seafood catch and exports pass through the harbour.

As per Financing Agreement executed between Ministry of Finance, Government of Pakistan and European Economic Community (EEC), the Government of Sindh through promulgation of an Ordinance established Karachi Fisheries Harbour Authority in May 1984, with an aim to operate and administer the Karachi Fish Harbour with all rights of ownership.

In 2020, Keamari District was carved out from Karachi West District, which was the previous jurisdiction over the harbour.

== Types of Fish in Pakistani Waters ==
Pakistan has a vast variety of fish including Tuna fish that has an export market. Most demanded varieties of Tuna fish include long-tail tuna, skipjack tuna and yellow-fin tuna.

== See also ==
- List of ports in Pakistan#Fish harbours
