= Fisheries Research and Training Institute =

Pakistani research institute

Fisheries Research and Training Institute, Lahore, Pakistan
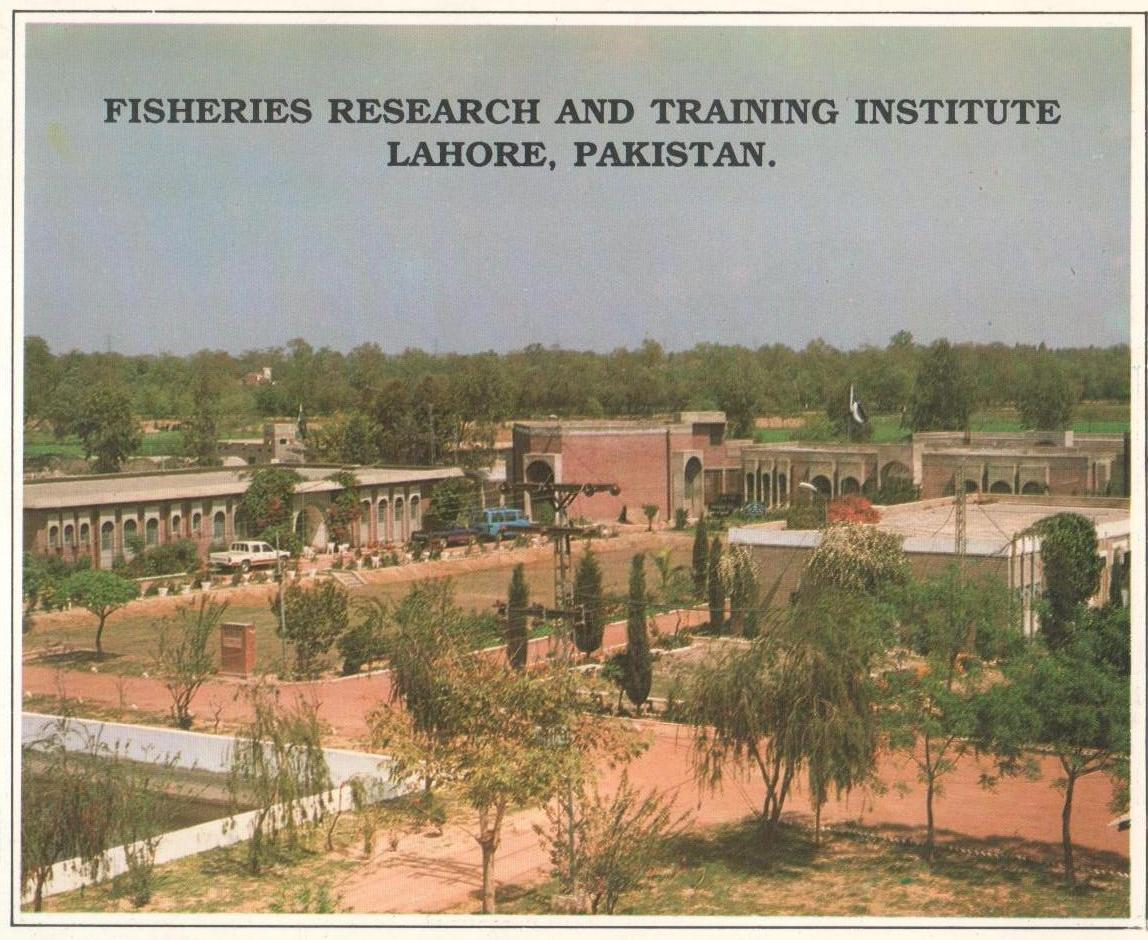
- Fisheries Research and Training Institute, Lahore, Pakistan
- Established: 1952
- Location: Batapur, Lahore, Pakistan
- Website: punjabfisheries.gov.pk

The Fisheries Research and Training Institute (Urdu: ادارہ تربیت و تحقیقِ ماہی گیری) is a research institution in Lahore, Pakistan. with work centring on inland fisheries and aquaculture in Pakistan. Its role is to promote fisheries and aquaculture in the country. The institute is divided in 7 sections: Aquaculture, Biology and Ecology, Nutrition, Pathology and Disease, Chemistry, Fisheries Management, and Training.

The institute is headed by the Director Fisheries (R&T), Punjab Lahore and each section is headed by a Deputy Director Fisheries, each of whom is assisted by Assistant Director Fisheries.

== Faculty ==
Sr #	Name	Designation	Qualification	Year Joined the Institute
1.	Dr. Sikandar Hayat	Director Fisheries	PhD, M.Phil.	Since 2008
2.	Dr.Ehsan Mehmood Bhatti	Deputy Director Fisheries	PhD	
3.	Zahid Iqbal Rana	Deputy Director Fisheries	B.Sc.	
4.	Muhammad Azeem Ch.	Deputy Director Fisheries	B.Sc.	
5.	Aftab Zaheer Khan	Deputy Director Fisheries	B.Sc.	
6.	Manzoor Hussain Bhatti	Assistant Director Fisheries	B.Sc.	
7.	Abdul Rehman Makki	Assistant Director Fisheries	B.Sc.	
8.	Tariq Raheed	Botanist	M.Sc. Botany	

== Research activities ==
The institute conducts multidisciplinary research and training activities, with the main objectives in related areas under:

- A. Merits of various aquaculture systems and methods to improve production of commercially important species
- a. Assessment of production potential with various levels of inputs in ponds.
- b. Formulation of low cost balanced feed.
- c. Breeding, selection and mass rearing.
- d. Diseases and their prevention.
- e. Pond engineering and water dynamics
- f. Fish production as a component of an integrated farming system.
- B. Biology and ecology of selected species of commercial importance
- a. Studies on food, feeding, reproduction, spawning, life cycles and behavior of selected species.
- b. Migration patterns of migrating species.
- C. Post-harvest technology for fish
- D. Management systems for lakes and reservoirs to improve fish production
- E. Control of pollution as affecting naturally occurring fish population
- F. Fisheries economics and marketing
- G. Studies of the socio-economic conditions of fishermen and fish farmers

== Training ==
The institute organizes short and long term specialized training courses of a multidisciplinary nature covering the basic and applied aspects of Fisheries and Aquaculture for pre-service and in-service Fisheries personnel and private entrepreneurs. These courses include:

- Pre promotion course for Director Fisheries
- Pre promotion course for Deputy Director Fisheries
- Pre promotion course for Assistant Director Fisheries
- Pre promotion course for Fisheries Research Assistant

== See also ==
- List of research institutes in Pakistan
