= Gadani Tehsil =

Pakistani administrative area

Gadani Balochi: تحصیل گڈانی Gaddani
- Tehsil of Hub District
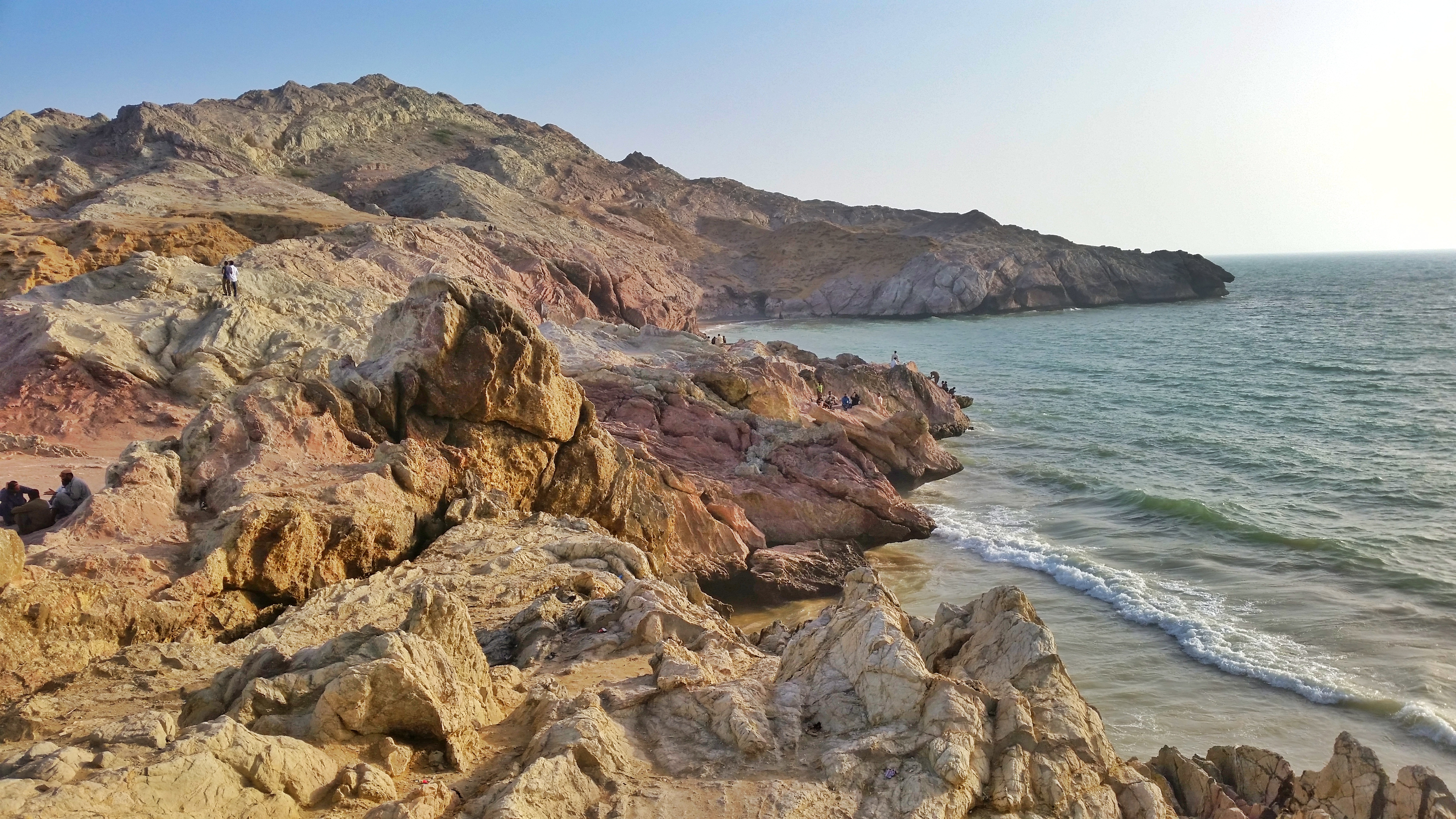
- The tehsil extends to the shores of the Arabian Sea.

- Location within Balochistan, Pakistan Location within Pakistan
- Coordinates: 25°07′0″N 66°44′0″E
- Country: Pakistan
- Province: Balochistan
- District: Hub District
- Headquarter: Gadani

Area
  - Tehsil of Hub District: 419 km^{2} (162 sq mi)

Population (2023)
  - Tehsil of Hub District: 29,215
  - Density: 69.73/km^{2} (180.6/sq mi)
  - Urban: 17,540 (60.04%)
  - Rural: 11,675 (39.96%)

Literacy
  - Literacy rate: 48.57%
- Time zone: UTC+5 (PST)
- Main languages: 28,001 Balochi

Gadani, also Gaddani (Balochi: گڈانی, Urdu: گڈانی pronounced [ɡəɖːaːni]) is an administrative subdivision (tehsil) of Hub District in the province of Balochistan, Pakistan. In 2023, the tehsil had a population of 29,215, more than half residing in urban areas, including its administrative centre of Gadani. The tehsil was part of Lasbela District until 2022, when administrative reforms led to the creation of Hub District. The new district includes Gadani, along with Dureji, Hub, Sakran, and Sonmiani tehsils.

== Location ==
Gadani tehsil spans an area of approximately 419 square kilometres and encompasses the southeastern coastal edge of Balochistan's arid, hilly terrain. While the majority of the landscape is dry and rugged, scattered patches of arable land support limited agricultural activity. Gadani shares its northern boundary with Sonmiani Tehsil and its western coastal edge with the Sonmiani Bay along the Arabian Sea. To the south lies the Hub River delta, bordering Hub Tehsil and the Keamari District of Sindh. Gadani Tehsil is situated approximately 25 kilometres (16 mi) from the outskirts of Hub Chowki and about 50 kilometres (31 mi) west of Karachi.

== Population ==
Historical population
Year	Pop.	±% p.a.
1951	...	—
1961	3,210	—
1972	7,104	+7.49%
1981	12,452	+6.43%
1998	18,957	+2.50%
2017	24,593	+1.38%
2023	29,215	+2.91%
Sources:Source: Pakistan Bureau of Statistics:

As per the 2023 national census, the tehsil has a total population of 29,215, comprising 11,675 rural and 17,540 urban residents. The town of Gadani serves as the tehsil's headquarters. The tehsil includes 6,578 households, of which 2,676 are in rural and 3,902 in urban areas.

The overall literacy rate is 48.57%, with a male literacy rate of 59.85% and a female literacy rate of 37.19%. These figures highlight ongoing challenges in access to education, particularly for women.

== Languages ==
In Gadani Tehsil, Balochi is the predominant language, spoken by approximately 28,001 individuals (95.9% of the population). Other languages include Pashto (506 speakers, 1.7%), Sindhi (488 speakers, 1.7%), Brahui (53 speakers, 0.2%), with the remaining population speaking various other languages. The Sindhi reported in this context largely refers to Lasi, a distinct local dialect of Sindhi also spoken in the costal region of Balochistan.

== Economy ==
In addition to the well-known Gadani Ship Breaking Yard and the Gadani Power Project, the tehsil is home to several major industrial developments, including Pakistan's largest Isomerization unit located at a plant in Mauza Kund. The government has also announced plans to promote maritime tourism in the area, with initiatives to be undertaken by the Pakistan Tourism Development Corporation (PTDC).
