= Bela, Balochistan =

Bela بیلہ
- City
- Location of Bela Bela (Balochistan, Pakistan)
- Coordinates: 26.2267°N 66.3113°E
- Country: Pakistan
- Province: Balochistan
- District: Lasbela
- Tehsil: Bela
- Elevation: 88 m (289 ft)

Population (2023)
  - Total: 29,380
- Time zone: UTC+5 (PST)

Bela (Balochi: بݔلہ), (Urdu: بیلہ) is a city in Lasbela District in the Balochistan province of Pakistan. It is an ancient city surrounded by hills above the Arabian Sea, nearly 180 km (110 mi) northwest of Karachi and 500 km (310 mi) south of Quetta. During the autumn of 325 BC, the settlement was part of the Asian campaign of Alexander the Great under the name Rhambacia (Greek: Ῥαμβακία). After Alexander conquered the town, he commended the place and thought that if he built a city there it would become great and prosperous and he left Hephaestion behind to build it. In 711 AD, it was part of Muhammad bin Qasim's campaign under the name Armabil.

== Name ==
Alexander's historians mention the river name as Arabius, and local people as Oreitans. The Arab sources call it Armabil or Armanil. The Chachnama, in addition, uses the names Armael, Armana-Bil, Armapilla. It is described as the second port city of Sindh, after Debal.

== Demographics ==
=== Population ===
Historical population
Year	Pop.	±% p.a.
1951	3,063	—
1961	3,139	+0.25%
1972	6,728	+7.18%
1981	11,172	+5.80%
1998	16,705	+2.39%
2017	24,603	+2.06%
2023	29,380	+3.00%

As of the 2023 census, Bela has population of 29,380.

=== Languages ===
Languages of Bela MC (2023 Census)
1. Balochi (84.7%)
2. Lasi (a dialect of Sindhi) (2.90%)
3. Pashto (2.20%)
4. Brahui (0.70%)
5. Punjabi (0.70%)
6. Urdu (0.40%)
7. Others (8.40%)

According to the 2023 census, Balochi is the predominant language in Bela (84.7%), followed by Lasi (2.9%), Pashto (2.2%), Brahui (0.7%), Punjabi (0.7%), Urdu (0.4%), and other languages (6.85%).

=== Religion ===
The population is predominantly Muslim with a small Sindhi Hindu community.

Religious groups in Bela City (1941 & 2017)
Religious group	1941		2017	
Religious group	Pop.	%	Pop.	%
Islam	3,389	86.79%	23,156	94.12%
Hinduism	469	12.01%	1,436	5.84%
Sikhism	47	1.2%	—N/a	—N/a
Christianity	0	0%	9	0.04%
Others	0	0%	2	0.01%
Total population	3,905	100%	24,603	100%

== Significance ==
Bela and surrounding areas have some mineral reserves. 64 kilometres (40 mi) north of Bela are the Kundi deposits where traces of chalcopyrite, Galena, and silver are also found. Manganese ore is also found in the ophiolitic belt of Bela. The tomb of Muhammad ibn al-Qasim's general, Muhammad ibn Haroon, is located in Bela.

== See also ==
- Gondrani - an ancient town near Bela
- Alexandria in Orietai
