= Churna–Kaio Islands Complex =

Archipelago of Pakistan

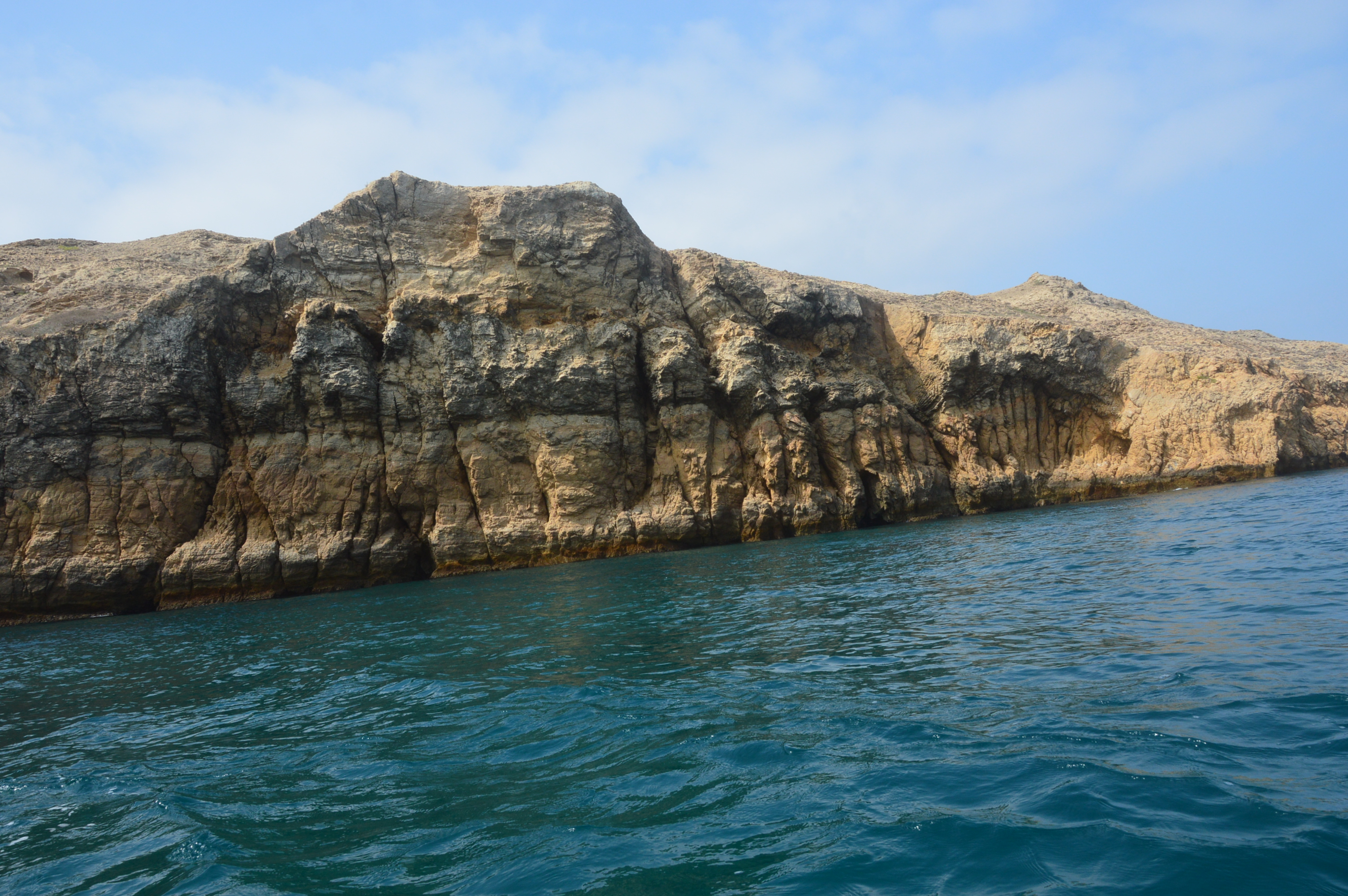

- Location within Pakistan Location within South Asia

Geography
- Location: South Asia
- Coordinates: 24°54′N 66°36′E
- Adjacent to: Arabian Sea
- Total islands: 2 uninhabited
- Major islands: Churna Island; Kaio Island
- Area: 0.6 km^{2} (0.23 sq mi)

Administration
- Pakistan

Demographics
- Population: 0

The Churna–Kaio Islands Complex are an uninhabited, rocky archipelago in the Arabian Sea, off the coast of Karachi, Pakistan, between the port of Gadani and the mouth of the Hub River in Hub District. There are two main islands:

- Churna Island, which is the largest and most southern island of the archipelago, lying about 6 km (3.7 mi) from the mouth of the Hub River;
- Kaio Island (also known as Chota Churna or Little Churna), lying about 2 km (1.2 mi) west of Gadani Ship Breaking Yard, and about 16 km (9.9 mi) northeast of Churna Island.
- There are also a number of rocky outcrops along the coast between the two main islands.

== Environment ==
The islands and the surrounding waters have a high level of biodiversity, hosting coral reefs, and various whale species. In September 2010 there was an organised clean-up of the waters around the islands as part of International Reef Cleaning Day.

There are various threats to the islands ecosystem including the large nearby Gadani Ship Breaking Yard, the incorrect disposal of fishing equipment, and an increase in snorkelling and diving by tourists. For these reasons, the islands were declared an "Ecologically or Biologically Significant Marine Area" by the Convention on Biological Diversity in 2016.

In 2017, a further threat emerged when the Bahria Foundation proposed to build an offshore LNG floating terminal close to Churna Island.

In 2021 the Pakistan Ministry of Maritime Affairs reiterated the need to protect environmentally sensitive areas like the islands. The provincial Government of Balochistan has made plans to "develop other tourist spots like Kaio Island, Churna Island...".

In April 2024, local fishermen reported seeing a blue whale in the waters around the islands. This was seen as an encouraging sign for the biodiversity of the area by the Pakistani branch of the World Wide Fund for Nature.
