= Hub Industrial & Trading Estate =

Industrial and trading estate in Hub, Balochistan, Pakistan

Coordinates: 25°03′21.5″N 66°52′14.8″E

Hub Industrial and Trading Estate (HITE) is an industrial estate located in Hub, Balochistan, Pakistan.

It was established in 1982 as a tax-free industrial estate.

== Lasbela Industrial Estates Development Authority ==
In Hub, there are 150 functional industries which are regulated and looked after by the Lasbela Industrial Estate and Development Authority (LIEDA).

== See also ==
- Hub Dam
- Hub Tehsil
- Hub Industrial & Trading Estate
- Hub River
- Hub District
