= Baroot =

Baroot باروت
- Town
- Country: Pakistan
- Region: Balochistan
- District: Lasbela District
- Time zone: UTC+5 (PST)

Baroot (Urdu: باروت) is a town and union council of Hub Tehsil, Lasbela District, Balochistan, Pakistan.
