= Kaio Island =

Island of Pakistan

- Location within Balochistan, Pakistan Location within Pakistan

Geography
- Location: South Asia
- Coordinates: 25°01′50″N 66°41′17″E
- Archipelago: Churna–Kaio Islands
- Adjacent to: Arabian Sea
- Area: 1.15 ha (2.8 acres)

Administration
- Pakistan

Demographics
- Population: Uninhabited

Kaio Island is an uninhabited, rocky island in the Churna–Kaio Islands Complex in the Arabian Sea, approximately 2 km (1.2 mi) west of the coast of Gadani, Pakistan. It is also known as Chota Churna or Little Churna, referring to the larger Churna Island which is about 16 km (9.9 mi) to the southwest. There are also a number of smaller rocky outcrops near Kaio and along the coast towards Churna.

== Environment ==
In 1991 the Government of Pakistan invited tenders for the construction of a coal-fired power plant on Kaio. This plan was approved by the World Bank as a way of addressing the energy shortage of the country but recommended to wait until the nearby Hubco power plant was finalised. However, the power plant on Kaio was never built.

The island and the surrounding waters have a high level of biodiversity, hosting coral reefs, and various whale species. In September 2010 there was an organised clean-up of the waters around the island as part of International Reef Cleaning Day.

The island is a regular location for fishing, with sports fishing contests being held there and other nearby locations in 2008 and 2011.

There are various threats to their ecosystem including the large nearby Gadani Ship Breaking Yard, the incorrect disposal of fishing equipment, and an increase in snorkelling and diving by tourists. For these reasons, the islands were declared an "Ecologically or Biologically Significant Marine Area" by the Convention on Biological Diversity in 2016.

In 2021 the Pakistan Ministry of Maritime Affairs reiterated the need to protect environmentally sensitive areas like the island. The provincial Government of Balochistan has made plans to "develop other tourist spots like Kaio".

In April 2024, local fishermen reported seeing a blue whale in the waters around the island. This was seen as an encouraging sign for the biodiversity of the area by the Pakistani branch of the World Wide Fund for Nature.
