= Dureji =

Pakistani town

Dureji دریجی
- Town
- Location in Pakistan Dureji دریجی (Pakistan)
- Coordinates: 25°53′9″N 67°18′1″E
- Country: Pakistan
- Region: Balochistan
- District: Hub District
- Tehsil: Dureji

Population (2023)
  - Total: 15,688
- Time zone: UTC+5 (PST)

Dureji (Urdu: دریجی) is a small town in Hub District, Balochistan, Pakistan, serving as the administrative centre of its namesake tehsil. Nestled in the foothills of the Kirthar Mountains, it lies roughly 110 kilometres (68 mi) north of Karachi.

Historical population
Year	Pop.	±%
2017	12,855	—
2023	15,688	+22.0%

With a population of 15,688, Dureji functions as a local hub for governance and trade. Economic life is shaped by subsistence agriculture, livestock, and seasonal migration. Infrastructure remains limited, with basic education and healthcare services. While peripheral in scale, Dureji is a bigger town within the broader context of the Tehsil.

== See also ==
- Tehsils of Pakistan
  - Tehsils of Balochistan
- Districts of Pakistan
  - Districts of Balochistan
- Divisions of Pakistan
  - Divisions of Balochistan
