= Dureji Tehsil =

Pakistani administrative area

Dureji Balochi: تحصیل دریجی
- Tehsil of Hub District
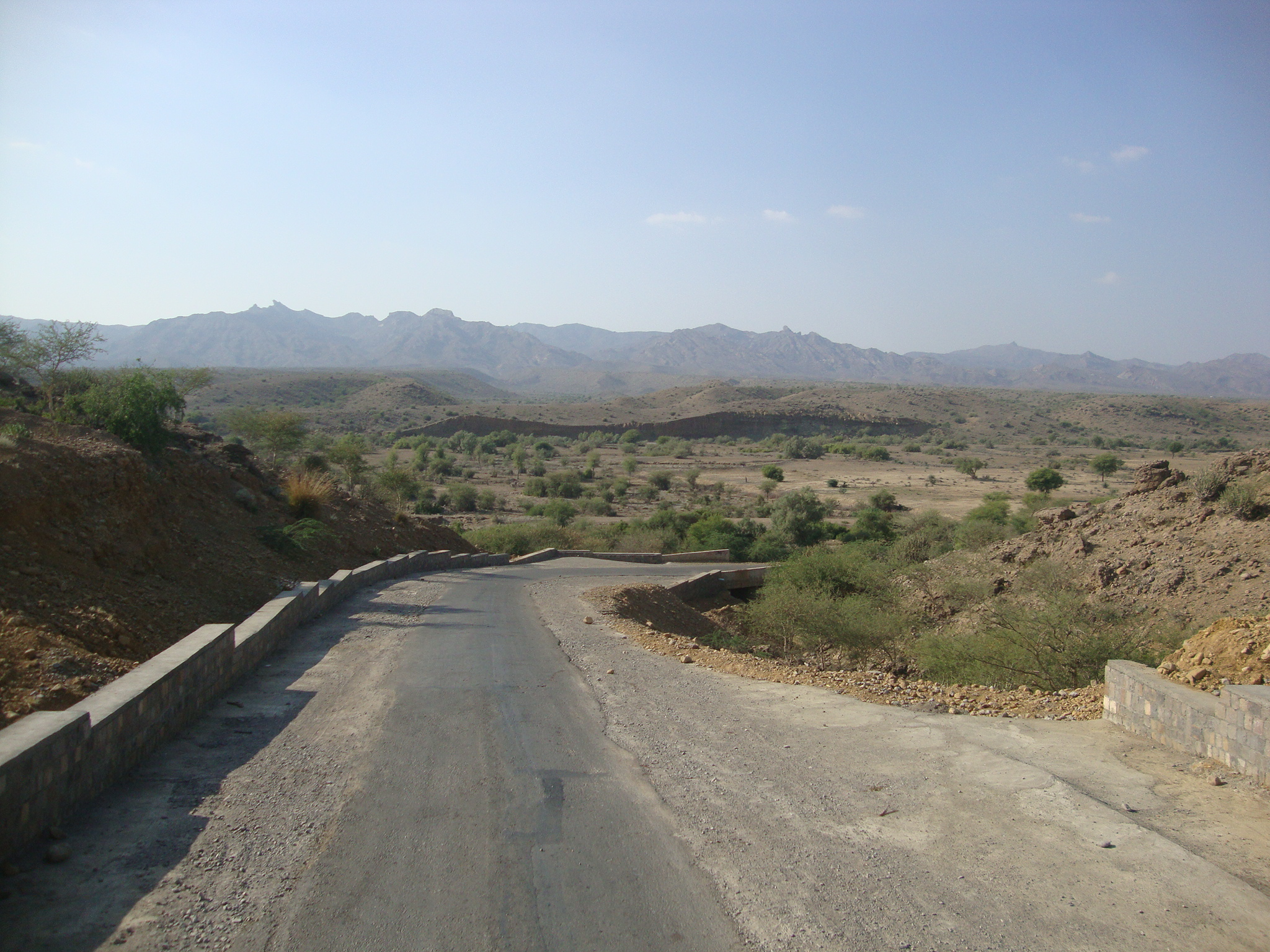
- Rural landscape of Dureji Tehsil

- Location within Balochistan, Pakistan Location within Pakistan
- Coordinates: 25°53′25″N 67°17′40″E
- Country: Pakistan
- Province: Balochistan
- District: Hub District
- Headquarter: Dureji

Area
  - Tehsil of Hub District: 2,813 km^{2} (1,086 sq mi)
- Elevation: 232 m (761 ft)

Population (2023)
  - Tehsil of Hub District: 52,236
  - Density: 18.57/km^{2} (48.1/sq mi)
  - Urban: 15,688 (30.03%)
  - Rural: 36,548 (69.97%)

Literacy
  - Literacy rate: Total: (15.58%); Male: (23.01%); Female: (7.70%)
- Time zone: UTC+5 (PST)
- Main languages: 40,259 Balochi, 7,068 Brahui, 4,254 Sindhi

Dureji (Note: Balochi: دریجی, Brahui: دریجی, pronounced [dʊˈreːdʒi]) is an administrative subdivision (tehsil) of Hub District in the southeast of the province of Balochistan, Pakistan. As of the 2023 census, the tehsil has a population of 52,236, with nearly 70% residing in rural areas. Its administrative centre is the town of Dureji. Formerly part of Lasbela District, Dureji tehsil became part of the newly formed Hub District in 2022, following administrative reforms that restructured the area into five tehsils: Dureji, Gadani, Hub, Sakran, and Sonmiani. Administratively, Dureji Tehsil is divided into two Union Councils.

According to socio-economic assessments, Dureji Tehsil has a high incidence of poverty, with 77.5% of households classified as poor and 27.3% identified as living in extreme or very poor conditions. These figures reflect Dureji's limited access to basic services, low income levels, and widespread socio-economic vulnerability.

== Geography ==
Dureji spans approximately 2,813 square kilometres, running north to south along the border with Sindh province. The territory is defined by arid and mountainous terrain, intersected by narrow valleys and seasonal streams. While much of the landscape is dry, small pockets of cultivable land support subsistence agriculture. The tehsil borders Hub in the south, Sonmiani to the southwest, Uthal and Saroona to the west, and Aranji to the north. To the east, across the provincial border, lies the Kirthar National Park, a protected area known for its biodiversity and rugged topography.

The region features a hot, arid climate with sparse xerophytic vegetation, including spiny shrubs, hardy bushes, and occasional trees, along with numerous seasonal plants. Average annual rainfall is around 75 mm, mostly falling during the June to September monsoon. Summers are extremely hot, with temperatures ranging from 44 °C to 48 °C, while winters are dry and milder, with daytime temperatures between 30 °C and 35 °C and nights dropping to 10 °C to 15 °C.

== Population ==
Historical population
Year	Pop.	±% p.a.
1951	...	—
1961	10,036	—
1972	15,389	+3.96%
1981	25,652	+5.84%
1998	31,504	+1.22%
2017	45,541	+1.96%
2023	52,236	+2.31%
Source: Pakistan Bureau of Statistics:

Dureji is home to 10,008 households, of which 6,945 are rural and 3,063 urban. The population is dispersed across small settlements in mountain valleys, with a low population density of approximately 19 persons per square kilometre.

The overall literacy rate stands at 15.58%, comprising 23.01% for males and 7.70% for females, underscoring significant gender disparities in educational attainment and limited access to schooling, particularly for rural women.

=== Languages ===
In Dureji Tehsil, Balochi is the predominant language, spoken by approximately 40,259 individuals (77.1% of the population). Other languages include Brahui (7,068 speakers, 13.5%), Sindhi (4,254 speakers, 8.1%), and the remaining population speaking various other languages. Sindhi in this context is a reference to Lasi, a distinct local dialect of Sindhi spoken in the costal region of Balochistan.

== Social aspects ==
Dureji Tehsil faces significant challenges in basic social infrastructure. Approximately 34% of children in the area are not attending school due to the absence of educational facilities, reflecting one of the lowest school enrolment rates in the region. Dureji also ranks among the tehsils most severely affected by the lack of basic healthcare services and access to safe drinking water, with few or no government schemes effectively implemented. Sanitation remains a critical concern, as Dureji has the highest prevalence of open defecation in the district. Economically, it records the lowest per capita income among the tehsils of Hub District, underscoring widespread poverty and limited livelihood opportunities. These overlapping deficits in education, health, sanitation, and income highlight the tehsil's urgent need for targeted development interventions.
