= Orita =

Orita may refer to:

- Orița M1941, Romanian World War II submachine gun named after Captain Marin Orița
- Orita Heinai (1847–1905), Japanese politician
- Masaki Orita (born 1942), Japanese lawyer
- Shōgo Orita (born 1989), Japanese professional shogi player

== See also ==
- Oritae, ancient Greek tribe of the sea-coast of Gedrosia
