= Haji Qadir Baksh =

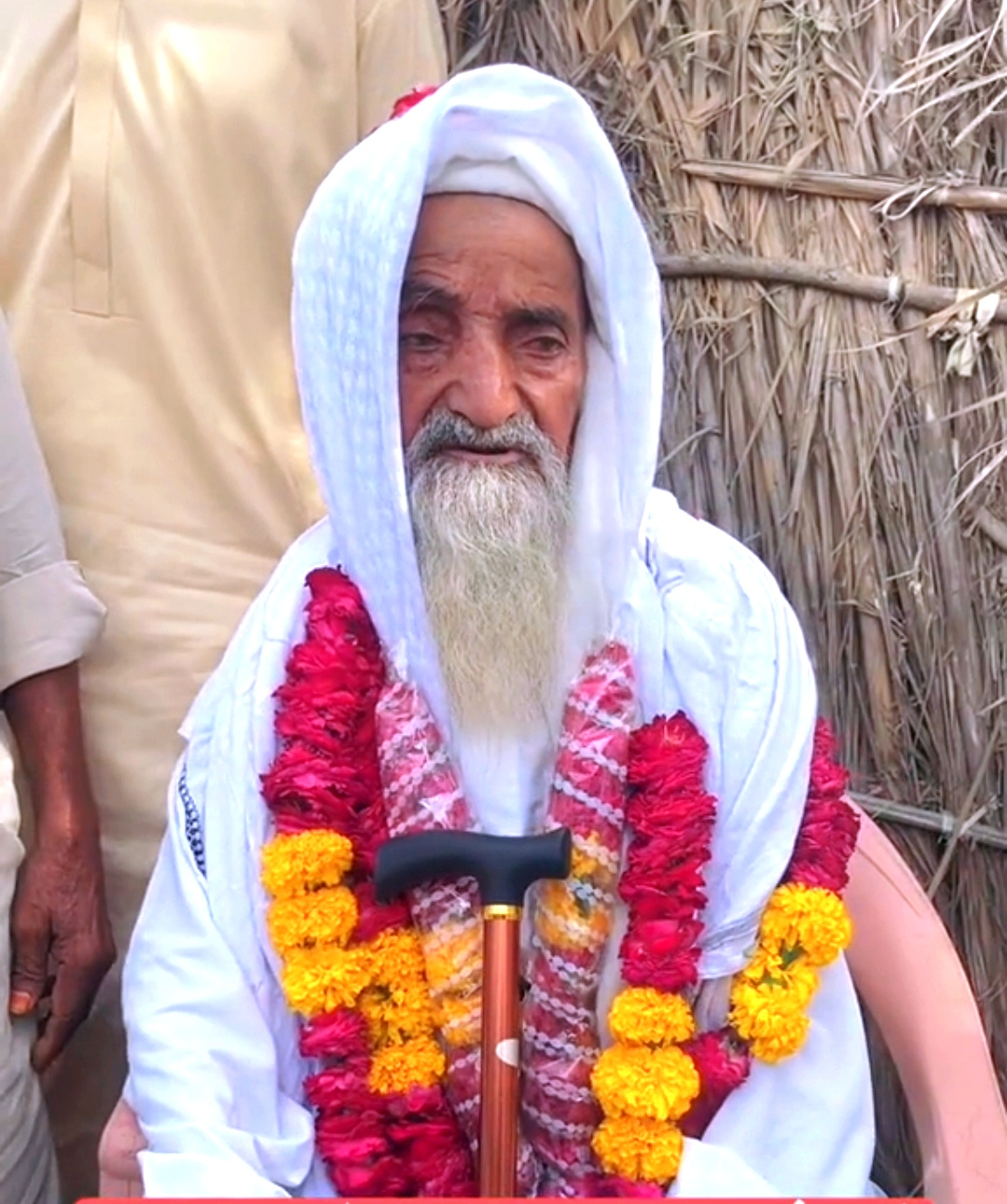
- Born: October 19, 1941; Pakistan

Haji Abdul Qadir Baksh Muree is an 82-year-old resident of the village of Goth Hajji Rahim in Hub, Balochistan. He gained widespread attention after a video of his return from performing Umrah went viral on social media. Despite living in poverty and lacking basic amenities, such as owning a phone, Bakhsh had saved diligently for 15 years to fulfill his dream of undertaking the pilgrimage.

== Popularity ==
Bakhsh's touching story exemplifies his unwavering faith and determination. His return to his humble dwelling, which lacks walls, became the subject of public fascination. During an interview with Arab News, Bakhsh saw the viral video for the first time, showcasing his surprise at the widespread attention he had garnered.

The hardships faced by Bakhsh reflect the struggles endured by many individuals living in impoverished conditions. However, his commitment to his religious beliefs and his dedication to saving for the Umrah pilgrimage serve as an inspiration to others.

Abdul Qadir Bakhsh's story resonated with people around the world, highlighting the power of faith and the strength of the human spirit in the face of adversity. His journey serves as a reminder of the importance of perseverance and the ability of individuals, regardless of their circumstances, to achieve their dreams through determination and sacrifice.
