= Oritae =

Ancient Persian group

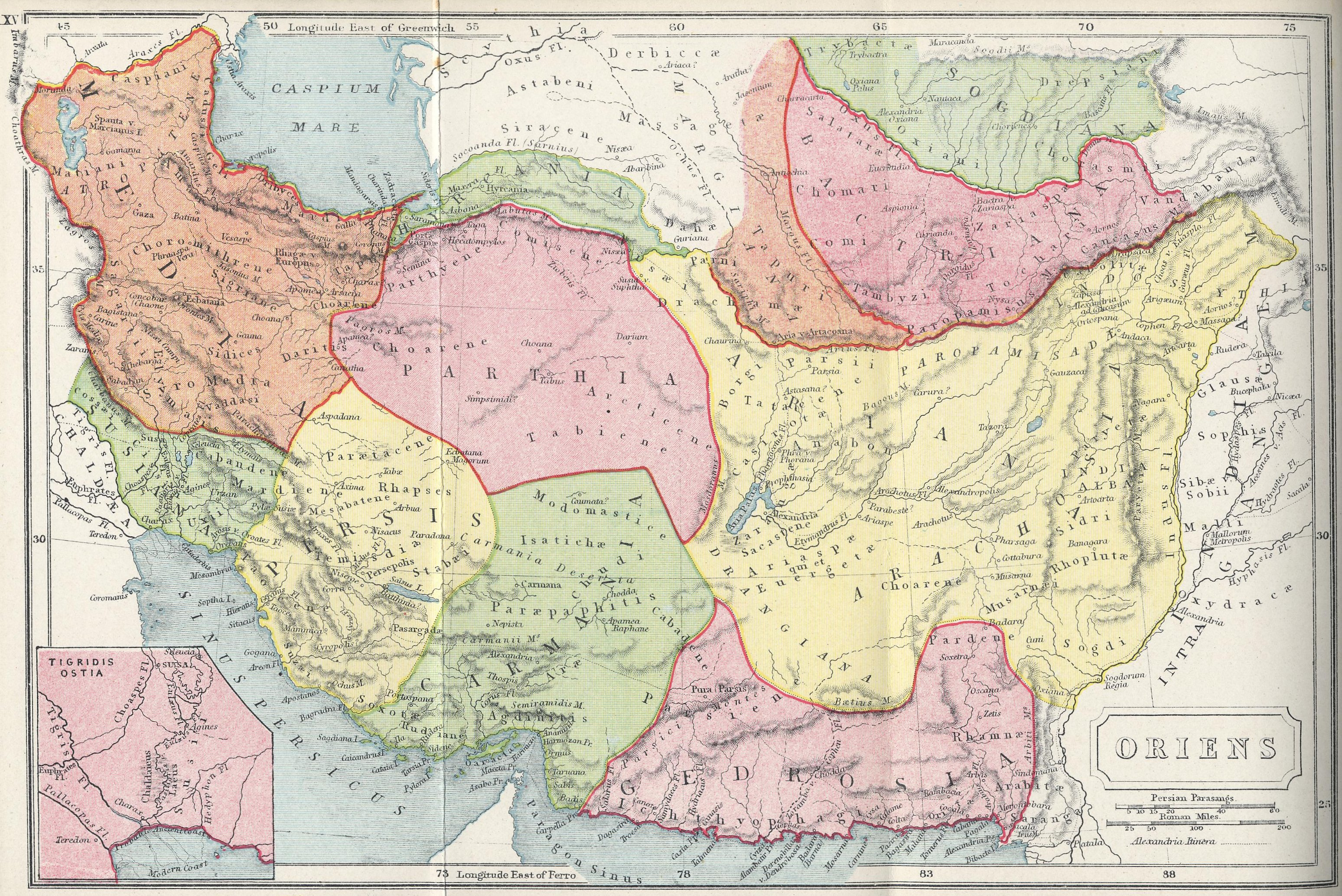
Map of Oriens, showing Oritai within Gedrosia

The Oritae or Oreitae (Ancient Greek: Ὠρεῖται, Ōreîtai or Ὠρῖται) were a tribe of the sea-coast of Gedrosia, mentioned by several ancient writers.

== History ==
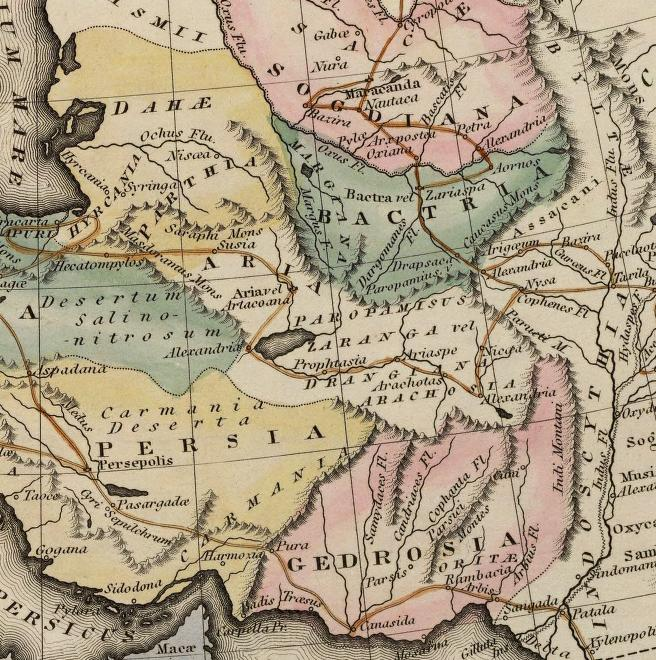
Map (detail) showing the route of Alexander through Gedrosia

The Oritae were a people inhabiting the sea-coast of Gedrosia, with whom Alexander fell in on his march from the Indus to Persia in 326 BC. Their territory appears to have been bounded on the east by the Arabis, and on the west by a mountain spur which reached the sea at Cape Moran.

There is considerable variation in the manner in which their names are written in different authorities: thus they appear as Oritae in Arrian; Oritai (Ὠρῖται) in Strabo, Dionysius Periegetes, Plutarch, and Stephanus Byzantinus; as Ori or Oroi (Ὦροι) in Arrian and Pliny; and Horitae in Curtius.

Arrian and Strabo have described them at some length. According to the former, they were an Indian nation, who wore the same arms and dress as those people, but differed from them in manners and institutions. According to the latter they were a race living under their own laws, and armed with javelins hardened at the point by fire and poisoned.

In another place Arrian appears to have given the true Indians to the river Arabis (or Purali), the eastern boundary of the Oritae; and the same view is taken by Pliny. Pliny calls them "Ichthyophagi Oritae"; Curtius "Indi maritimi".

Rambacia (Ῥαμβακία) was the first village of the Oritae, which was taken by Alexander the Great.

== See also ==
- Alexandria in Orietai
- Indian campaign of Alexander the Great

== Sources ==
=== Primary ===
- Jones, Horace Leonard (1930). The Geography of Strabo, with an English Translation. Vol. 7. London: William Heinemann Ltd.; New York: G. P. Putnam's Sons. pp. 129, 139.
- Rackham, H. (1961). Pliny: Natural History, with an English Translation. Vol. 2. Cambridge, MA: Harvard University Press; London: William Heinemann, Ltd. pp. 411, 527.
- Robson, E. Iliff (1966). Arrian, with an English Translation. Vol. 2. London: William Heinemann, Ltd.; Cambridge, MA: Harvard University Press. pp. 167–171, 177, 373.

=== Secondary ===
- Vaux, W. S. W. (1857). "Oritae". In Smith, William (ed.). Dictionary of Greek and Roman Geography. Vol. 2: Iabadius–Zymethus. London: Walton and Maberly. p. 493.
- Vincent, William (1797). The Voyage of Nearchus from the Indus to the Euphrates. London: T. Cadell jun. and W. Davies. pp. 188, 217.
- Wiesehöfer, Josef (2006). "Oreitae". In Salazar, Christine F. (ed.). Brill's New Pauly. Brill Publishers. Retrieved 15 May 2022.
