= Oreitans =

Oreitans/Oritans and Oreitians/Oritians (Ancient Greek: Ὠρείταις) were the ancient inhabitants of modern Lasbela District in Balochistan province of Pakistan.

Alexander the Great crossed what is now the Hub River through Lasbela on his way back to Babylon after conquering Northwestern India. Alexander called the river Arabius and the local people Oreitans. Their largest town was called Rhambacia (Ῥαμβακία). One more town which is mentioned by name is Ora (Ὤροις). After Alexander conquered them, he made Apollophanes as satrap of the area. Alexander told Hephaestion to build a city in Rhambacia and to Apollophanes to build a city in Ora. After Alexander left, at some point the Oreitans rebelled. Leonnatus managed to defeat them, killing 6,000 and all their leaders, while losing only 15 cavalrymen and a handful of men, but Apollophanes was killed in the battle.

== See also ==
- Arabius
- Rhambacia
