= Alexandria in Orietai =

- City
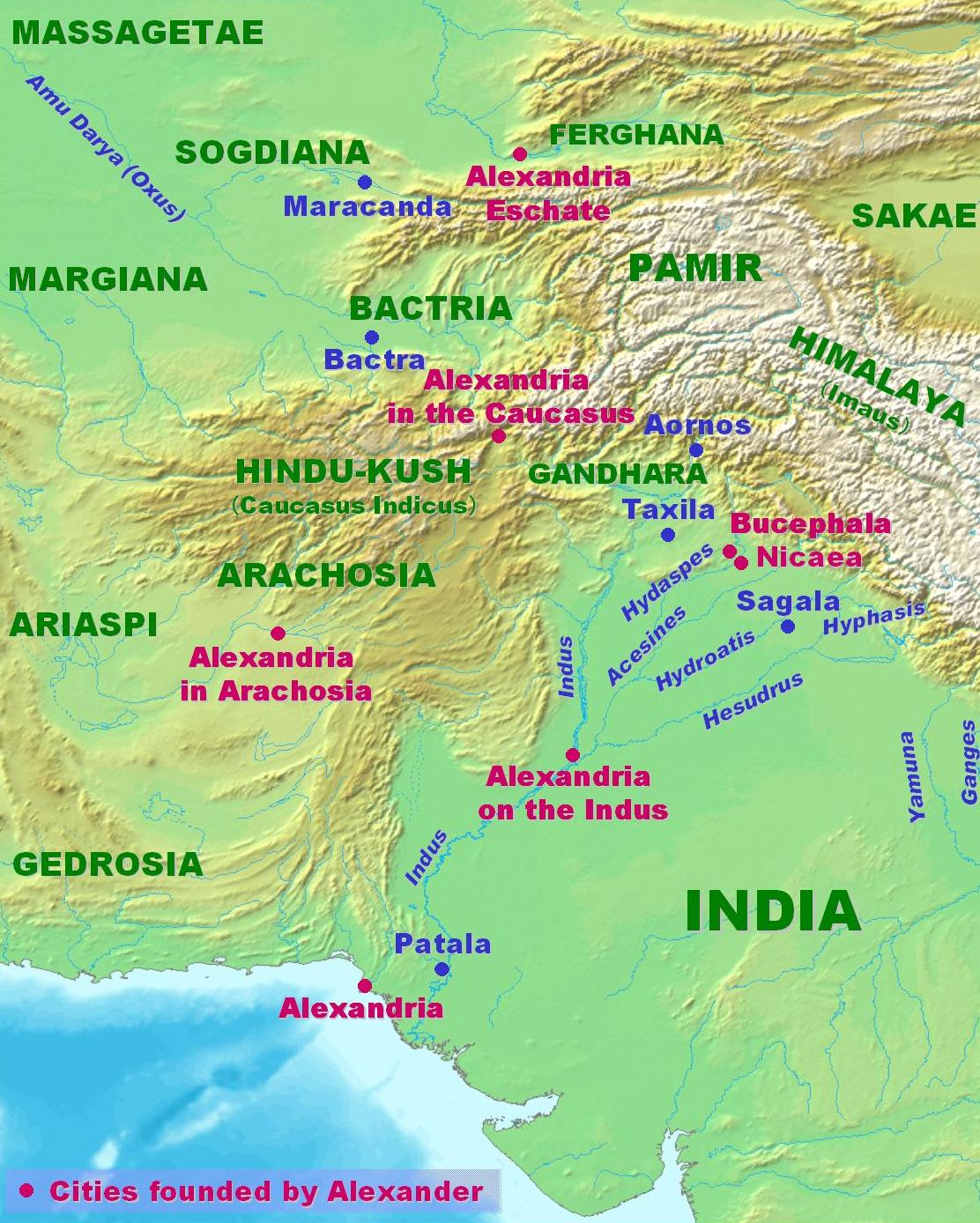
- Cities of Alexander in Pakistan
- Coordinates: 27°30′N 67°30′E
- Country: Pakistan
- Established: 325
- Founder: Alexander the Great

Alexandria in Orietai was one of the seventy-plus cities founded or renamed by Alexander the Great.

The town was founded by Alexander in autumn of 325 BC after his army had separated from Nearchus and the boats near the mouth of the Indus River. The sources agree that a town was built among the Oritae, that the fortification was left to Hephaestion and Leonnatus be built in the autumn of 325 BC and that it was located near Rhambacia, the largest town of the Oreitai. The core of colonists were retired Arachosian horsemen.

Alexander probably intended the new town to be an emporium controlling the local and Indian spice trade through the passes to Kandahar. The area certainly had exotic resources for trade. Written four centuries later the Roman Periplus of the Erythraean Sea says that this area "yields much wheat, wine, rice and dates but along the coast there is nothing but Bdellium".

== Location ==
The exact site of the city in Balochistan, Pakistan is still unknown but several locations have been proposed:

- Stein locates it near modern Bela, Pakistan and this remains the most popular site.
- Diodorus, however, says it was on the coast. Although it is uncertain the extent to which the coast has changed in 2 1/2 millennia.
- Tarn, however, thinks no city was built here due to a lack of Greek artefacts in the area.

== See also ==
- Bela, Pakistan
- List of cities founded by Alexander the Great
