= Churna Island =

Uninhabited Pakistani island in the Arabian Sea

Charna Island
Native name: جزیرہ چرنا Nickname: Cheerno
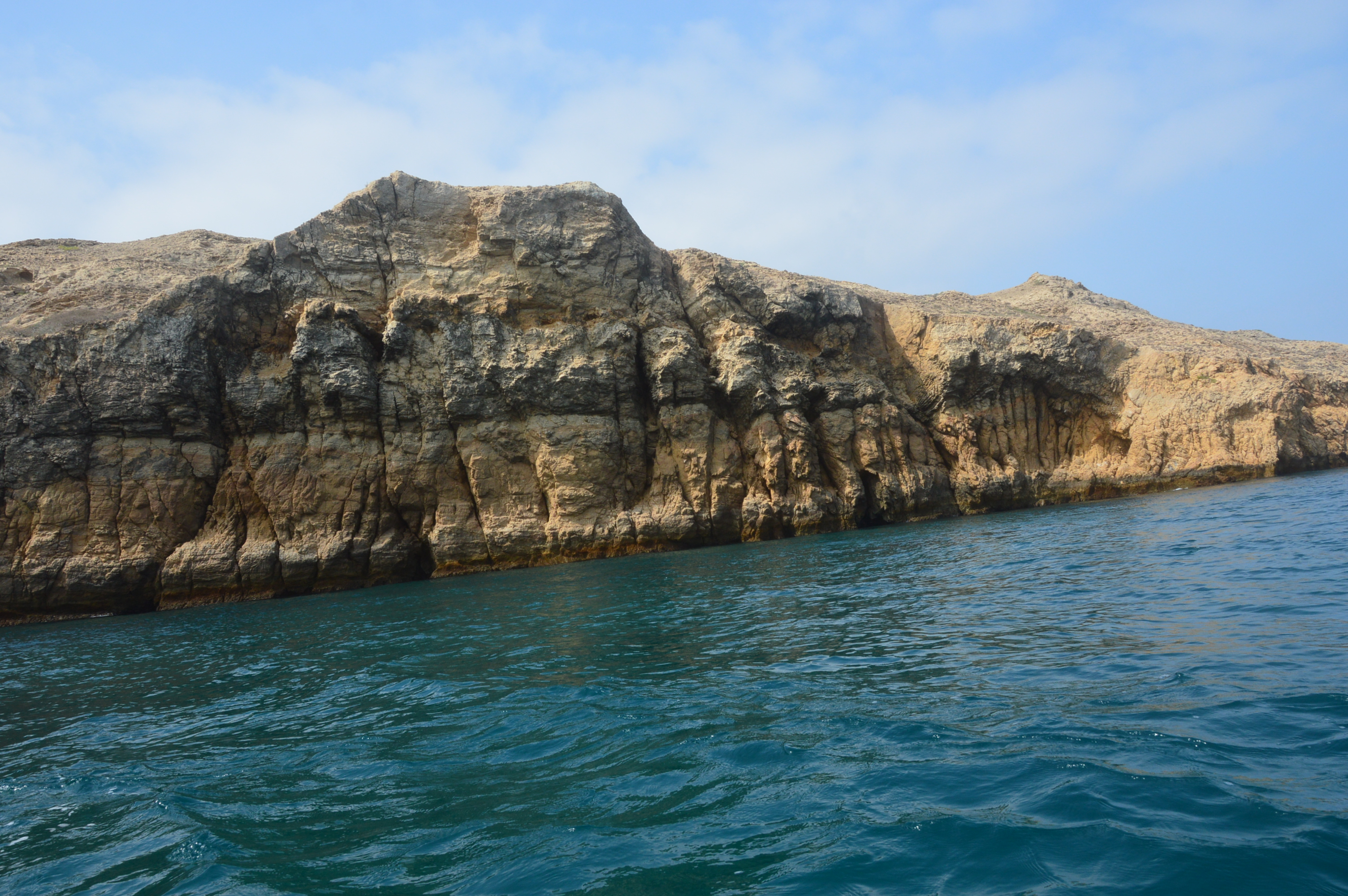
- Charna Island
- Interactive map of Charna Island
- Etymology: Charna (to sprinkle)

Geography
- Location: Mubarak Goth, Kiamari Town, Karachi, Sindh
- Coordinates: 24°54′N 66°36′E
- Archipelago: Churna–Kaio Islands
- Adjacent to: Arabian Sea
- Area: 0.6 km^{2} (0.23 sq mi)
- Length: 1.2 km (0.75 mi)
- Width: 0.5 km (0.31 mi)
- Highest elevation: 90 m (300 ft)

Administration
- Pakistan

Demographics
- Population: Uninhabited

Charna Island (also spelled Churna Island; Urdu: جزیرہ چرنا) is a small, uninhabited Pakistani island located in the Arabian Sea, about 9 km (5.6 mi) west of the mouth of the Hub River called Manjhar Beach, at the provincial border of Balochistan and Sindh. Churna is approximately 1.2 km (0.75 mi) long and 0.5 km (0.31 mi) wide and is part of the Churna–Kaio Islands. Charna is also locally known as Cheerno. It is 6 kilometres (3.7 mi) away from Mubarak Village. Fishermen from the nearby village of Mubarak Goth go fishing near Churna Island. Mubarak Goth is the second-largest fisherman locality in Karachi; nevertheless, it lacks basic amenities including education, health care, jetties, ownership rights, and communication. On 4 August 2020, the Government of Pakistan released a new political map that for the first time shows the offshore islands of Churna and Astola.

== Climate ==
Churna Island, situated approximately 9 kilometers west of Karachi in the Arabian Sea, experiences a tropical semi-arid climate (Köppen classification: BSh). The island's maritime location contributes to a smaller diurnal temperature variation, resulting in minimal differences between daytime and nighttime temperatures.

The surrounding sea acts as a thermal buffer, absorbing heat during the day and releasing it at night, thereby stabilizing temperatures. This moderation creates a relatively consistent climate throughout the year. The best time to visit Churna Island is from October to March, when the weather is cooler and sea conditions are favorable for activities like snorkeling and diving.

The weather ranges from 26c to 32c in Summer. The winter ends in march and weather becomes hotter in April and the end of march. Churns island has less rainfall around 20 inches annually. The island has no trees or shrubs.

== Background ==
Churna is mostly used as a firing range by the Pakistan Navy. Many naval incidents related to Churna Island have been cited in Pakistan Navy books. It has a historical importance in Pakistan Navy. It is also used by tourists for activities such as scuba diving, freediving, underwater photography, hiking, speed boating, kneeboarding, wakesurfing, banana tubing, jet skiing, cliff diving, and snorkeling.

The area surrounding Churna is popular for scuba diving because of the presence of widely varied marine life and different kinds of coral reef. According to Yousuf Ali, founder of the Karachi Scuba Diving Centre, "there are more than 60 types of corals found near Churna waters and many new corals started to flourish" after the 2004 Indian Ocean tsunami. Jellyfish are found in large numbers during October.

== Wildlife ==
On 14 September 2017, a mother blue whale was spotted near the island along with her calf. The mother was 17 meters in length. This was the first sighting of a living blue whale in the Pakistani sea, as previous blue whales were just beached skeletons of the dead whales; the last specimen had been observed at Khuddi Creek along the coast of Sindh in August 2014. There have been 47 sightings of baleen whales in this area but none of them were blue whales. On 22 November 2017, a killer whale was spotted near the island, a rare sighting as killer whales are found in deep water, whereas the water where the whale was sighted was only 72 meters deep. It was also the first sighting of a killer whale in the Karachi area since 2003. Other marine life around Charna includes the yellow-bellied sea snake, great barracuda, narrow-barred Spanish mackerel, cobia, mahi-mahi, skipjack tuna, angel fish, sea urchin, sea fan, oyster, ray fish, and the rare green turtle. The Pakistan Game Fishing Association (PGFA) holds national angling competitions near Charna. It is the presence of coral reefs around this island that attracts the number of big game fish around it. However, illegal net sizes used by fishing trawlers are destroying this natural treasure.

== Conservation status ==
In September 2024, the Government of Balochistan designated Churna Island as Pakistan's second Marine Protected Area (MPA), following Astola Island's designation in 2017. The designation aims to protect the island's rich marine biodiversity, which includes over 50 species of corals, 250 species of fish, and various invertebrates and vertebrates. Despite its protected status, Churna Island faces significant environmental threats due to ongoing human activities. These include industrial developments such as power plants and oil refineries, marine pollution, and unregulated recreational activities like scuba diving and jet skiing.

The island's designation as an MPA contributes to Pakistan's commitment under the Kunming-Montreal Global Biodiversity Framework, which aims to protect 30% of marine areas by 2030.

== See also ==
- List of islands of Pakistan
