= Gadani Beach =

Beach in Balochistan, Pakistan

Gadani
- Beach
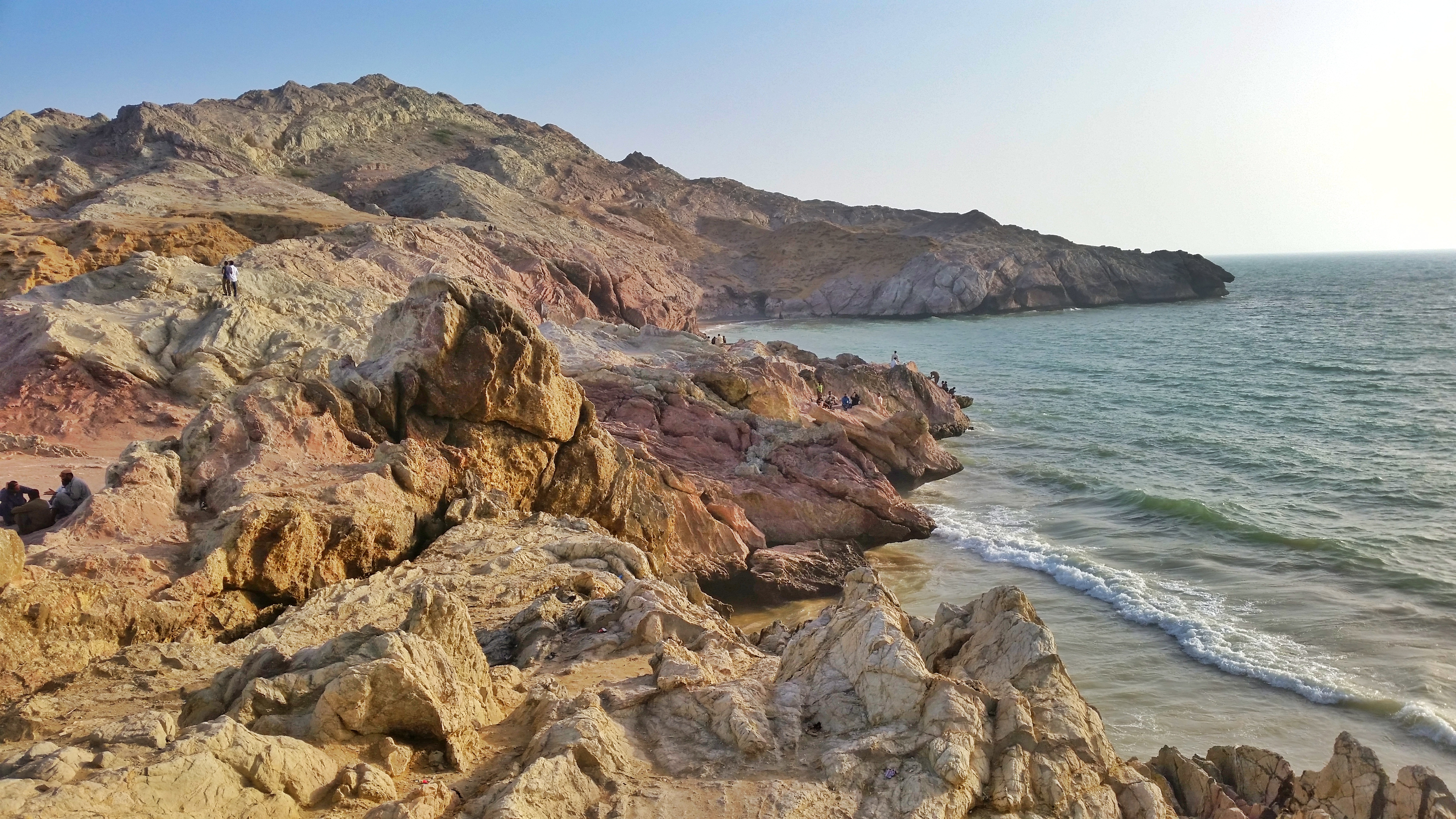
- View of Madani Beach

- Location within Balochistan, Pakistan Location within Pakistan
- Coordinates: 25.1187°N 66.7207°E
- Location: Hub District, Balochistan, Pakistan
- Part of: Sonmiani Bay
- Water bodies: Arabian Sea

Gadani Beach is a beach on the Arabian Sea located near the Hub River and Cape Monze in Gadani, Hub District, Balochistan, Pakistan.

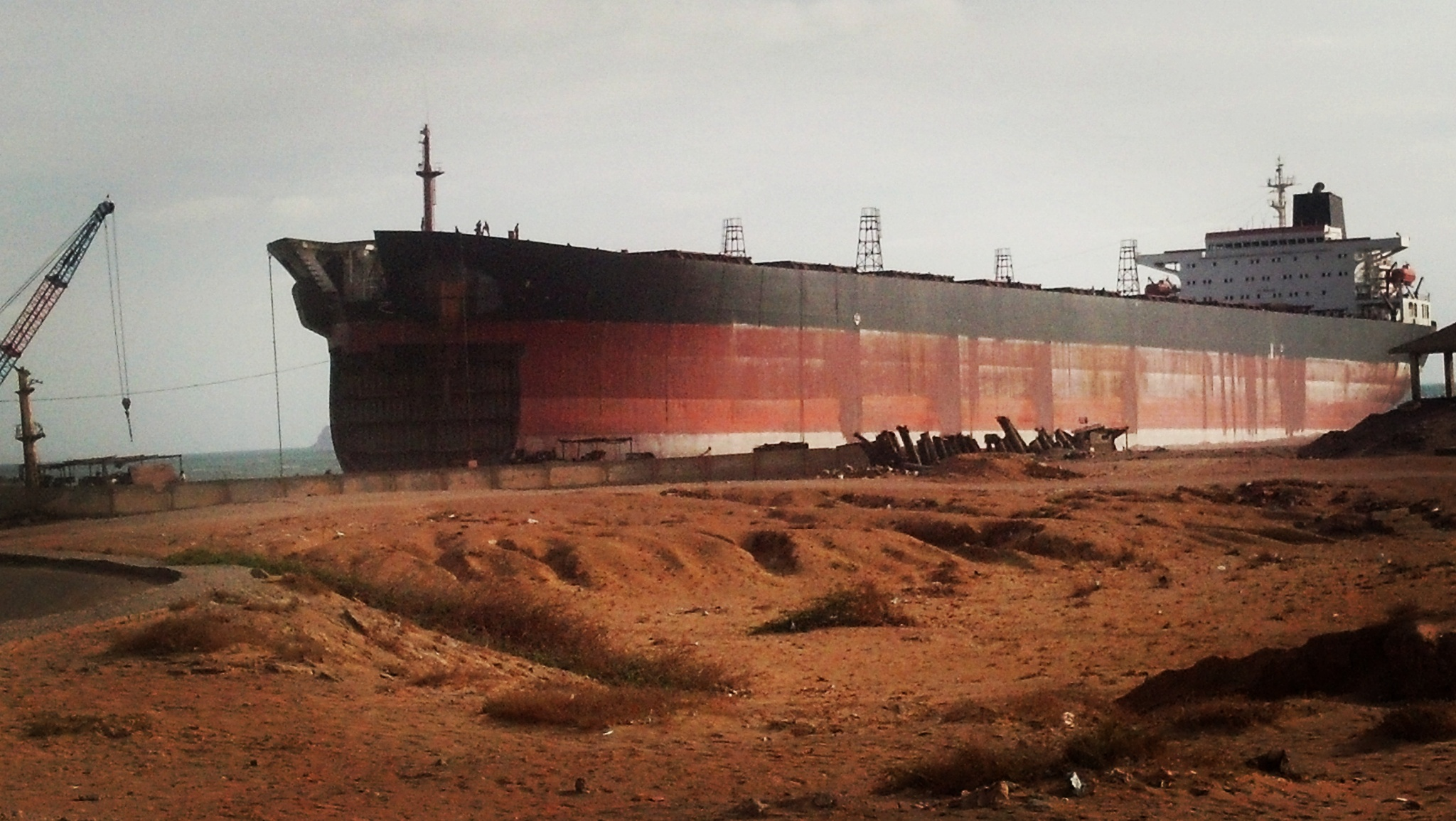
Ship breaking yard at Gadani

Gadani Beach is the location of Gadani ship-breaking yard, which was once one of the world's largest ship-breaking yards. Simultaneously, the location is gradually garnering interest among local tourists.

== Gallery ==
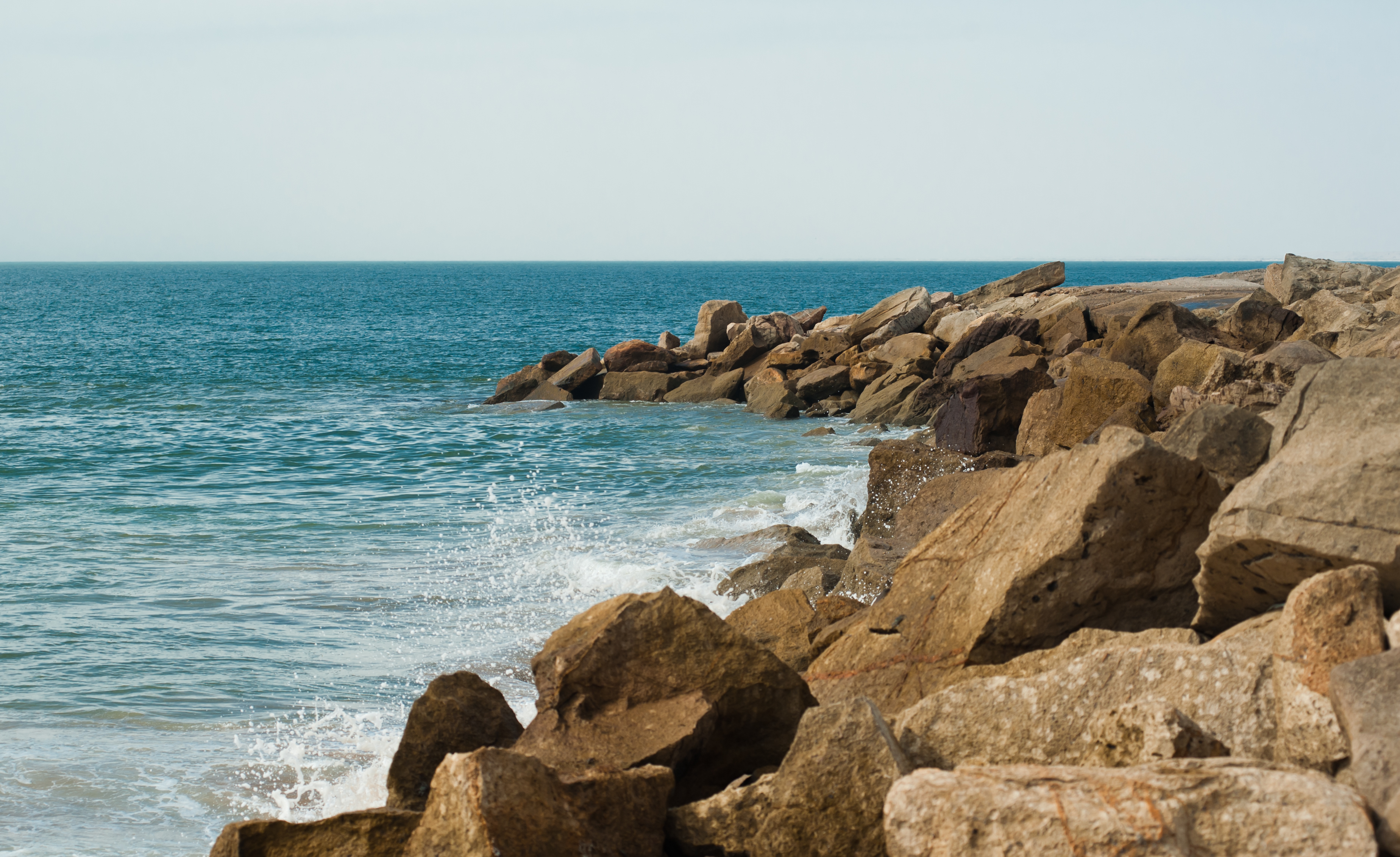

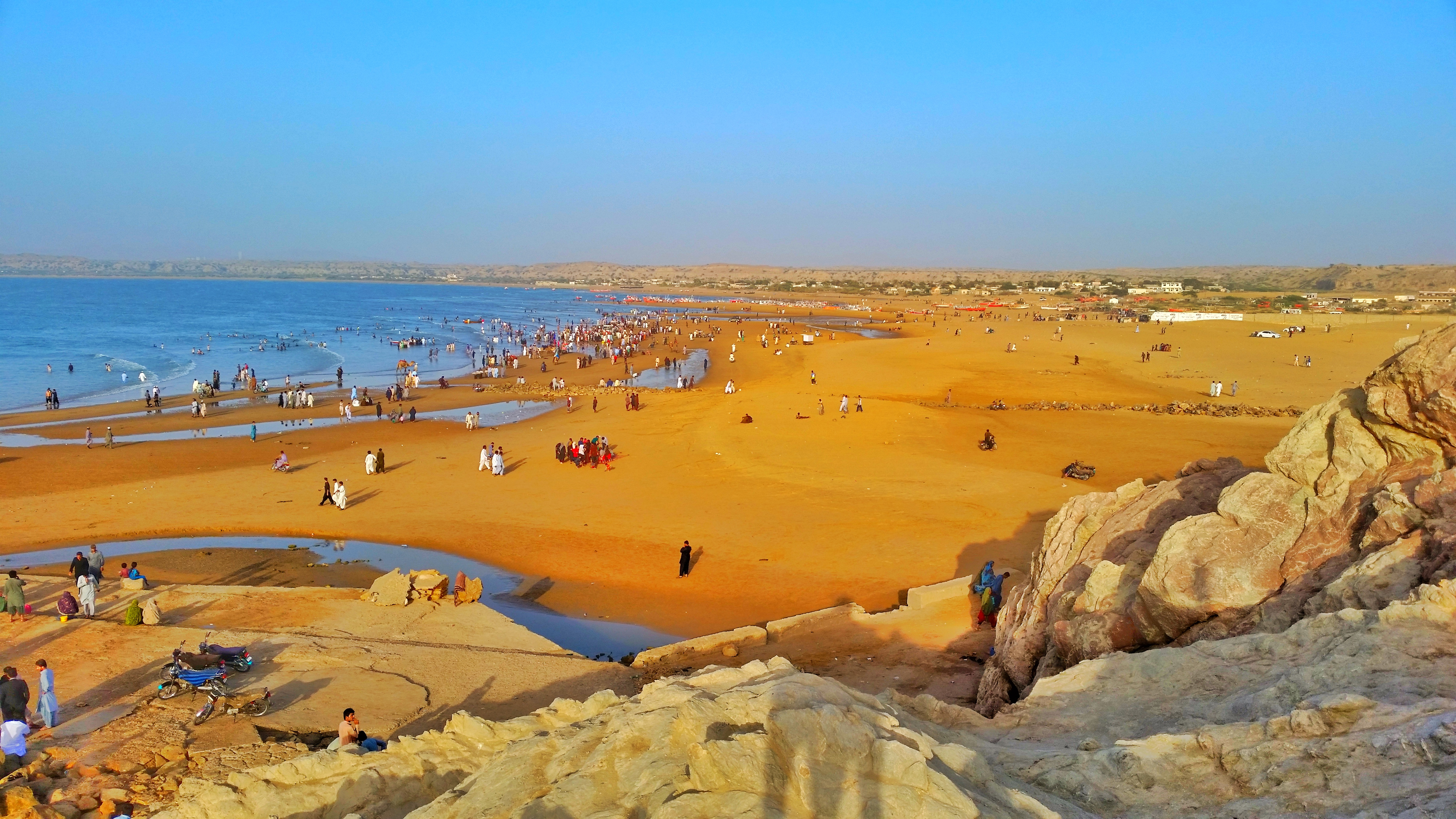

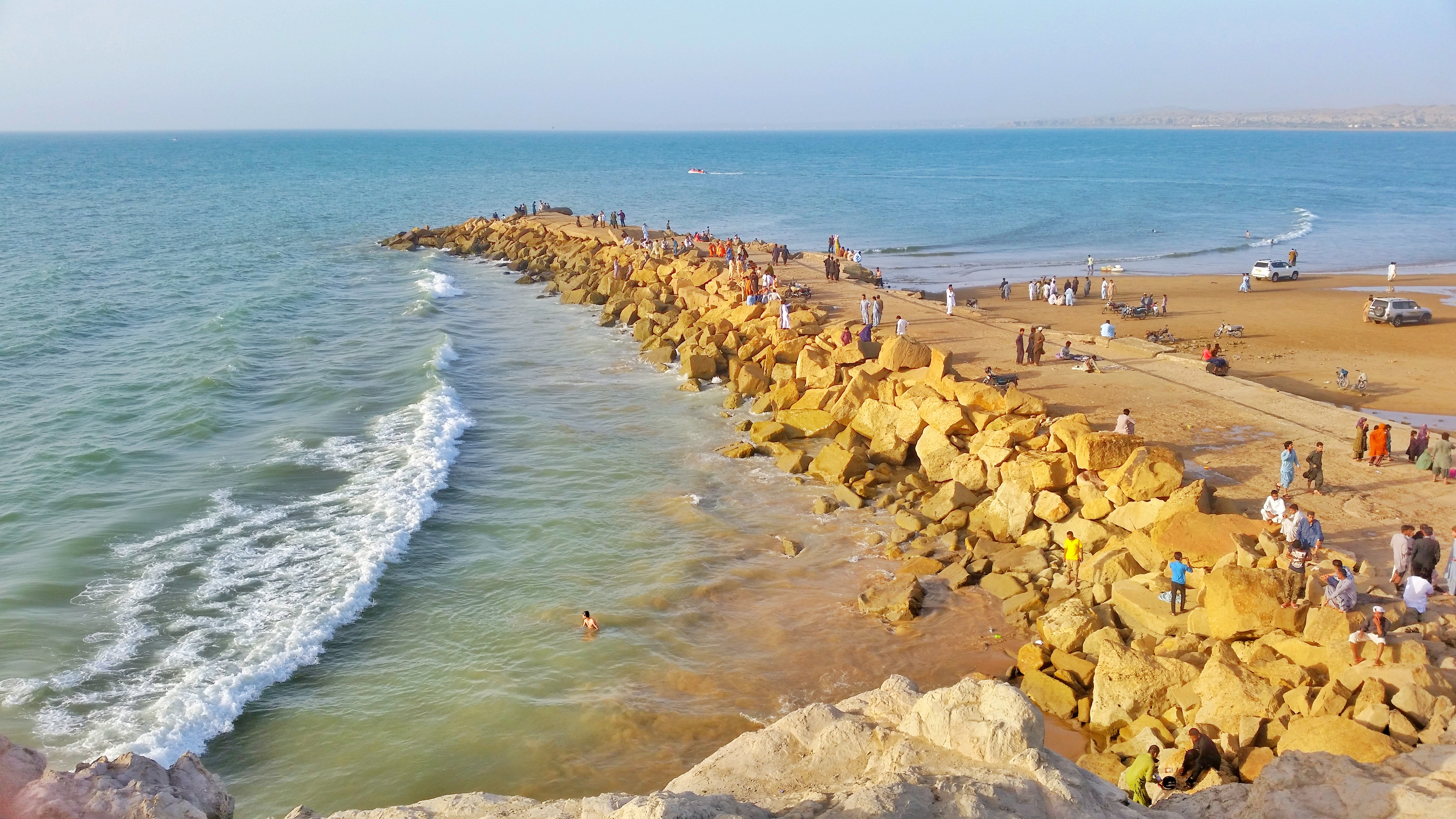

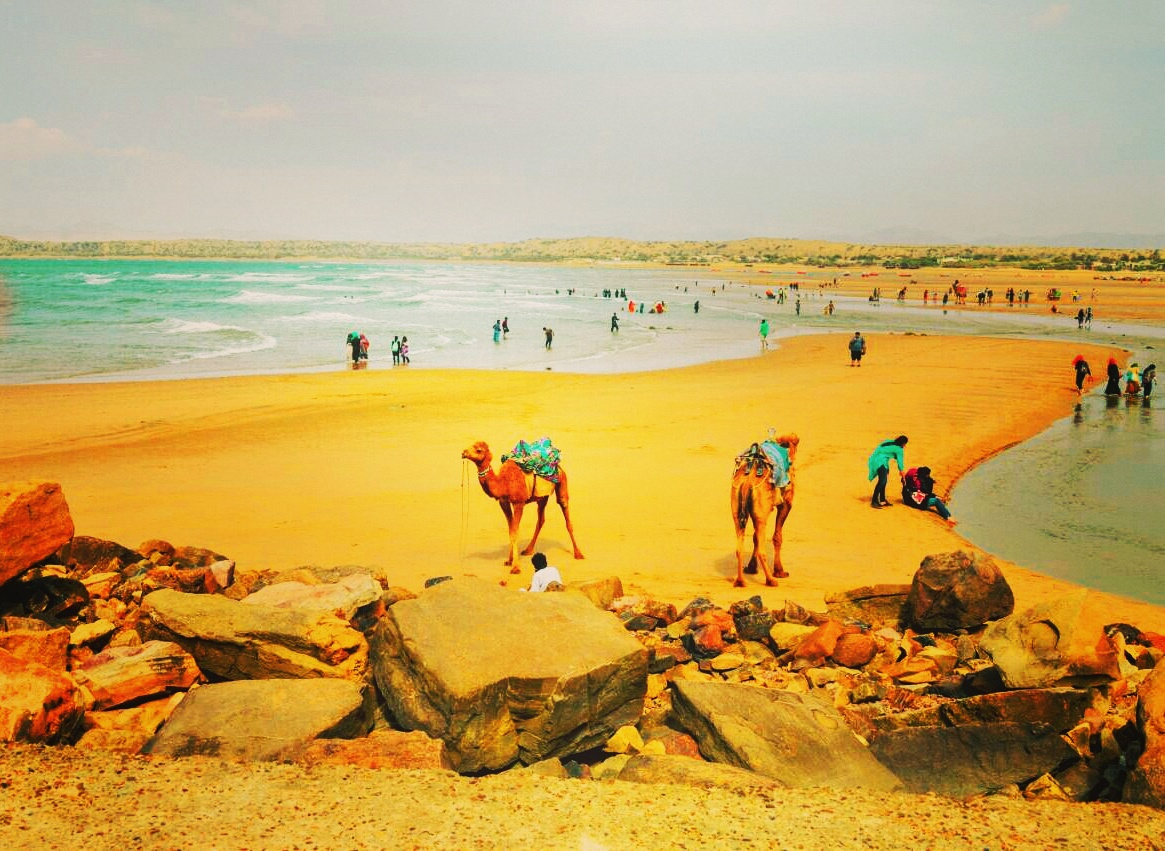
