= Hub Canal =

Water supply canal in Pakistan

The Karachi Hub Water Canal Project is project to supply 100 million U.S. gallons per day (4.4 m^{3}/s) of filtered, potable water to Karachi West District in Sindh province, Pakistan.

== Hub System ==
The Hub system was developed by Water and Power Development Authority (WAPDA) in the 1980s. It consists of a 30-kilometre canal network supplying 100 MGD to Karachi and 37 MGD to Balochistan as per approved allocation. Of this system, 22 km is currently managed by KW&SC, while 8 km remains under WAPDA's control.

Karachi Water Supply Canal will have a Design Discharge Capacity of 210 cfs.

== Old Hub Canal ==
As of 13 August 2025, the Old Hub Canal has been under renovation. At this time it was almost 50 years old, and suffered leaks.

== New Hub Canal ==
On 13 August 2025, Member of the National Assembly Bilawal Bhutto inaugurated the New Hub Canal. Capacity of the new canal is 100 MGD (million gallons per day), as confirmed by Karachi Water & Sewerage Corporation, while canal supply water from Hub Dam to Karachi. The canal will serve people in Keamari District and Karachi West. The cost of New Canal is Rs 12.8 billion.
