= Sakran =

Pakistani administrative area

Coordinates: 25°04′N 66°57′E

Sakran Urdu ساکران - Balochi And Brahui ساکوران
- Interactive map of Sakran
- Country: Pakistan
- Region: Balochistan
- District: Hub District

Population
  - Total: 17,000
- Time zone: UTC+5 (PST)

Sakran is a town and administrative subdivision (tehsil) of Hub District in the province of Balochistan, Pakistan.

Most of the population are Baloch & Lasi, and minority are Pashtun. The main tribes are Bizenjo, Rakhsani, Marri, Rind, Gurginari, Mohammed Hasni, Sasoli, Qalandrani, Mengal, Meerwani, Qambrani, Shaikh, Jamot, Moondra, Wahora, and Kakar. 99% of the population are Muslim while the remainder are Hindu and Christian.

The region was part of Lasbela District until 2022, when the district was split to create Hub District: containing this tehsil along with Dureji Tehsil, Gadani Tehsil, Hub Tehsil, and Sonmiani Tehsil. It was given official status of tehsil in 2025.
