= Hub Dam Reservoir =

Dam in Balochistan, Pakistan

Hub Dam
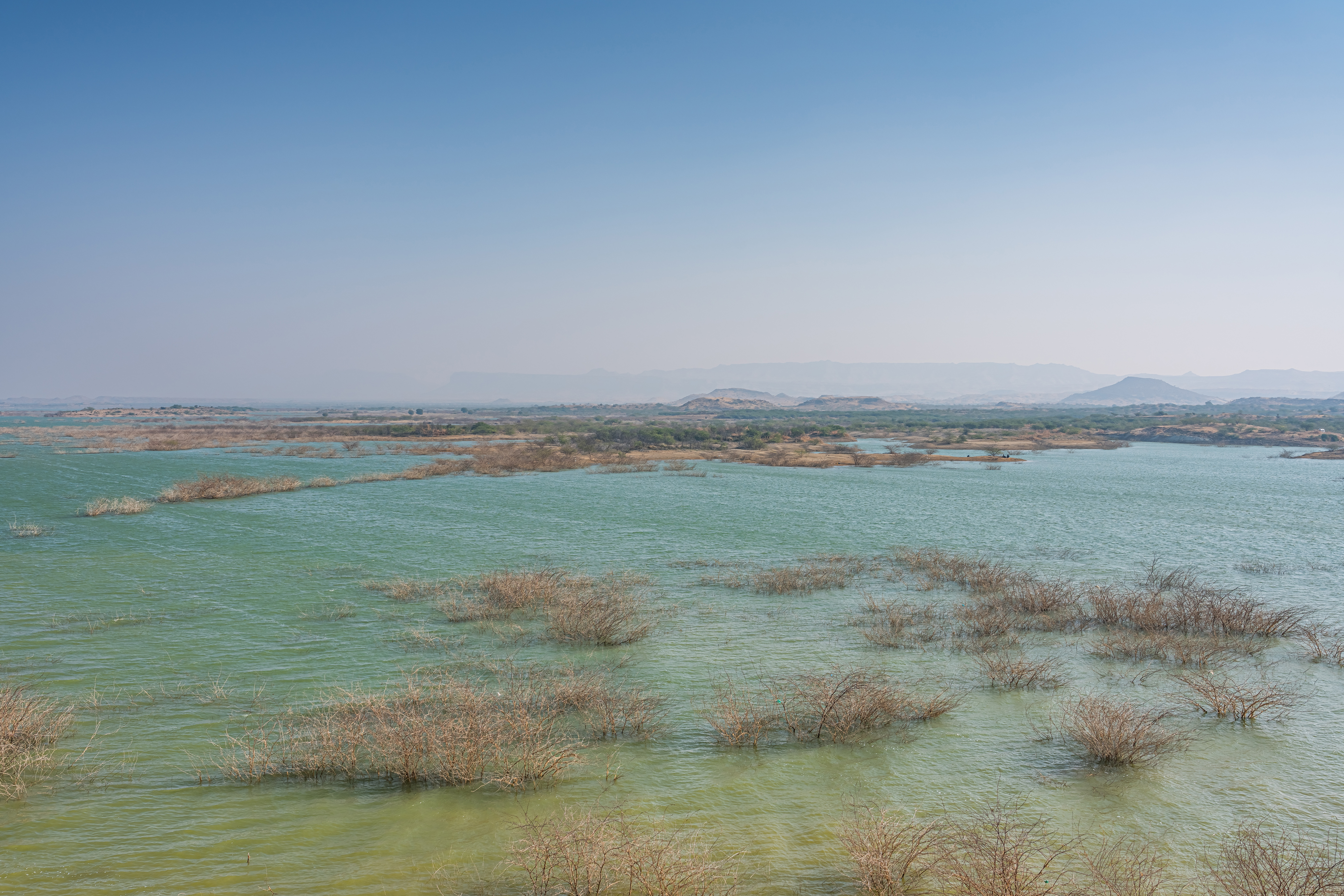
- Interactive map of Hub Dam
- Official name: حب ڈیم
- Country: Pakistan
- Location: Sindh-Balochistan provincial border 45 kilometres (28 mi) north-east of Karachi
- Coordinates: 25°15′21″N 67°6′51″E
- Purpose: Municipal; Industrial; Irrigation
- Construction began: September 1963
- Opening date: June 1981
- Construction cost: Rs. 1191.806 million (US$4.3 million)
- Operator: WAPDA

Dam and spillways
- Type of dam: Earth fill dam
- Impounds: Hub river Shoring Nullah

Reservoir
- Total capacity: 687,276 acre⋅ft (0.847742 km^{3})
- Active capacity: 656,000 acre⋅ft (0.809 km^{3})
- Inactive capacity: 41,806 acre⋅ft (0.051567 km^{3})
- Catchment area: 3,410 square miles (8,800 km^{2})
- Surface area: 29.06 square miles (75.3 km^{2})

Power Station
- Installed capacity: .5v MW

Ramsar Wetland
- Designated: 10 May 2001
- Reference no.: 1064

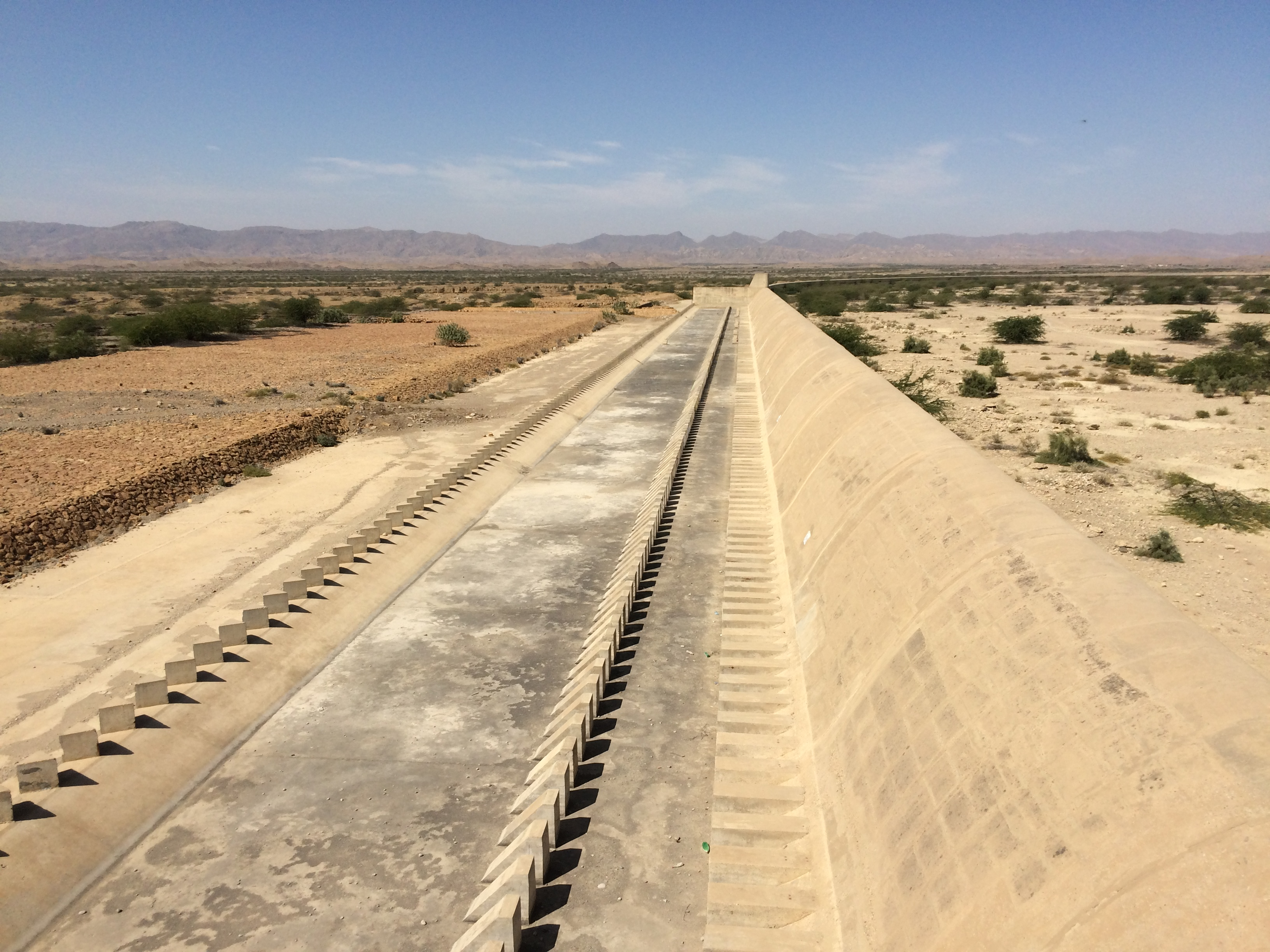
Spillway of Hub Dam

Hub Dam Reservoir (Urdu: حب ڈیم) is a reservoir on the Hub River. It is situated 56 km from Karachi city in Karachi and Hub District on Sindh and Balochistan provinces border. The reservoir extends to 9,834 ha (24,300 acres) with a gross storage capacity of 857000 acre feet. It is Pakistan's fifth-largest reservoir. It is an important source of drinking water for the metropolitan city of Karachi.

In 1974, the government of Sindh declared the area around the reservoir as a wildlife sanctuary. The sanctuary is about 27219 hectares in size. It is a favorable area for feeding and nesting for cranes, pelicans, ducks and waders. It also an important habitat of migratory birds. The reservoir was designated a Ramsar site on 1 May 2001.

Hub Dam Reservoir is also a tourist resort. On weekend holidays many people from Karachi visit to enjoy picnics, swimming, and fishing. A rest house of WAPDA is also located there for tourists to stay.

In August 2018, Wapda was due to enhance Hub Dam's storage capacity and set up a small hydroelectric power project at the dam, but no ground works have started yet as of August 2020.

== Historical records ==
Before winter rains in February and March 2019, the level of water in the reservoir dropped to 276 ft. A spell of rains in the southwestern province of Balochistan in February and March 2019 has led to an increase in the water level at Hub Dam, raising the level to 348 feet by 70 feet till March 3, 2019. The dam's water level rose close to its maximum capacity of 340 feet after almost 13 years on 27 August 2020. The dam's water level rose close to its maximum capacity of 335 feet on 18 July 2021.

== See also ==
- List of dams and reservoirs in Pakistan
- Karachi Bulk Water Supply Project
- Hub District
- Hub River
- Hub, Balochistan
- Hub Tehsil
- Hub Dam Wildlife Sanctuary
