= Hub, Pakistan =

City in Balochistan, Pakistan

Hub حب
- City
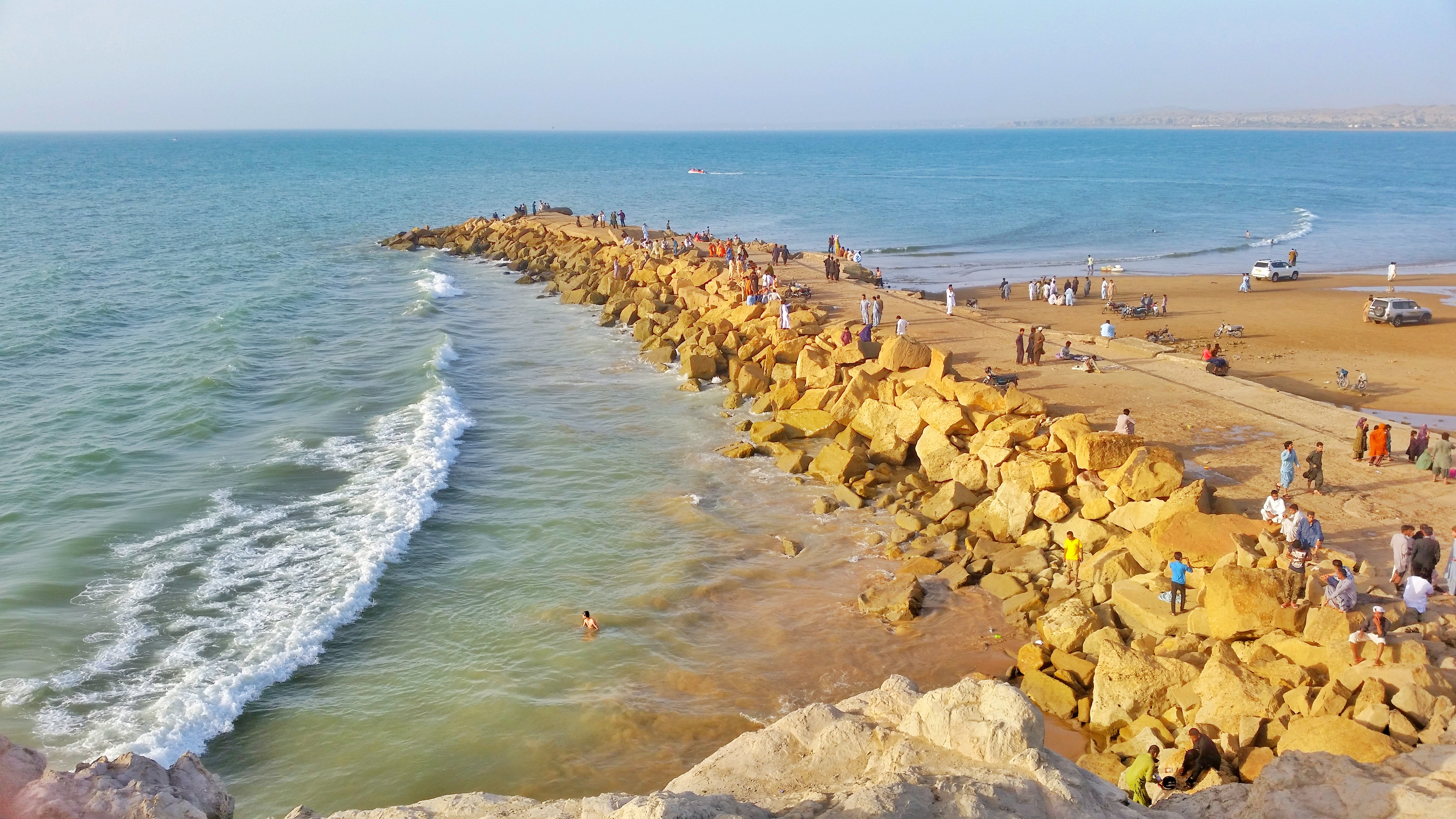
- Gadani Beach, Hub

- Location of Hub Hub (Pakistan)
- Coordinates: 25°4′3.2232″N 66°55′1.3368″E
- Country: Pakistan
- Province: Balochistan
- Division: Lasbela
- District: Hub

Government
  - Type: Municipal Corporation
  - Mayor: Seat Vacant

Population (2023)
  - City: 195,661
  - Rank: 54th in Pakistan; 4th in Balochistan
- Time zone: UTC+05:00 (PST)
- Postal codes: 90250
- Calling code: +92-853-XXX XXX

Hub (Balochi, Lasi and Urdu: حب) is a city and capital of the Hub District in Balochistan province of Pakistan. It is the 54th largest city of Pakistan by population according to the 2023 census, and also Balochistan's fourth most populous city.

Hub is an industrial city, after the development of factories and many other industries, the town was renamed as Hub. It is one of the largest industrial centres of Balochistan, and because of its proximity to Karachi, is becoming a commuter town of the Karachi metropolitan area.

== History ==
Following the downfall of the Sultanate of Makran (mid-12th to early 14th century A.D.), the succeeding state of Kalmat (which lasted from 14th to mid-16th century) flourished in the coastal region extending from Pasni southward, most probably as far as the Hub river.

== Demographics ==
Population

Historical population

| Year | Pop. | ±% p.a. |
|---|---|---|
| 1981 | 4,249 | — |
| 1998 | 62,763 | +17.16% |

| Year | Pop. | ±% p.a. |
|---|---|---|
| 2017 | 175,376 | +5.56% |
| 2023 | 195,661 | +1.84% |

According to 2023 census, Hub had a population of 195,661.

Languages

Languages of Hub (2023 Census)
1. Balochi (64.2%)
2. Brahui (15.4%)
3. Sindhi (11.5%)
4. Pashto (5.11%)
5. Saraiki (1.64%)
6. Punjabi (0.97%)
7. Urdu (0.56%)
8. Others (0.62%)

The majority of the population is Muslim, while there are small Hindu and Christian minorities. Increased commercialization in this area has led to many social, political and hygienic problems. The worsening state of roads and streets in the area has made everyday life difficult. Roads are too busy as the area serves as a hub between Lasbela and Karachi, that is one of the main reasons behind the lack of development in this area.

== Economy ==
Hub is economically one of the largest industrial cities in Balochistan. Hub is emerging as a commercial centre due to its proximity to Karachi. The Bazaars and markets are full with varieties of goods as well.

The Byco Petroleum's (now Cnergyico) refineries, Cadbury, DG Cement, Attock Cement, Ismail Industries Limited, Hubco Power Project, Bosicor Petrochemical Refineries (now Cnergyico) are located at Hub near Karachi.

== Education ==
There are a number of primary (till class 5), secondary (till class 8) and high schools (till class 10/SSC) in Hub, including an English Language Center, Government Degree College, private college and public library each. However, the city lacks universities.

=== SSC schools ===
- Global Islamic Public School GIPS
- The Citizens Foundation (TCF) has nine campuses in Hub
- Sadiq Public Secondary School has five campuse
- Grammar High School And secondary School
- Special Public High School (Zehri Street Hub)
- Government School of Hub for Boys (Patrha Hub)
- Government School of Hub for girls (Adalat Road Hub)
- Ideal Public High School
- Muslim Public High School (Lasi Road Hub)
- Rind Academy High School Hub (Goth Mohammed Ali Rind. Mehmmood Abad Road Hub)
- Balochistan Kids Academy Hub
- National Cambridge High School (Allahabad town Hub)
- Crescent Public High School
- The Hub City School
- Balochistan School
- Oxford High School

=== Other schools ===
- The Excellence English Public School
- Brilliant Future Public School (secondary school)
- The Future Reformers School Madina colony Hub
- Government School for Boys, Akram Colony (primary school)

Noor public high school (madina colony)

- Bright Future Grammar School (nazar chorangi hub)

=== Language Center ===
- School of Genesis Innovation (S.G.I)
- School of Intensive Teaching (S.I.T)
- The Hub English language Academy (THA)

• IDL- Institute of Dynamic Learning Hub (IDL English Hub)

- The informative academy hub TIA at lassi road hub Computer and technical training center registered from Balochistan board TTB

=== HSC colleges ===
- Government Degree College Hub

=== Private colleges ===
- The Professors Academy
- sadiq Public College Hub

=== Undergraduate colleges ===
- Government Degree College Hub
- Balochistan College of Education

=== Public Library ===
- S.G.I Public Library
- Hub Public Library
- S.I.T Public Library

Courses provided by colleges in Hub include FSC, FA, BSC and BA, however, these colleges lack education for IT, I.com, Engineering, Medical or ICS. Students from Hub have to transfer to Karachi, Uthal or other cities to proceed to university-level education.

== See also ==
- Sonmiani
- Somiani Spaceport
- Sonmiani Beach
- Lasbela District
- Hub District
- Hub Tehsil
- Hub River
- Hub Industrial & Trading Estate
