= Hub District =

District in Balochistan, Pakistan

Hub District ضِلع حَب
- District of Balochistan
- Hub District
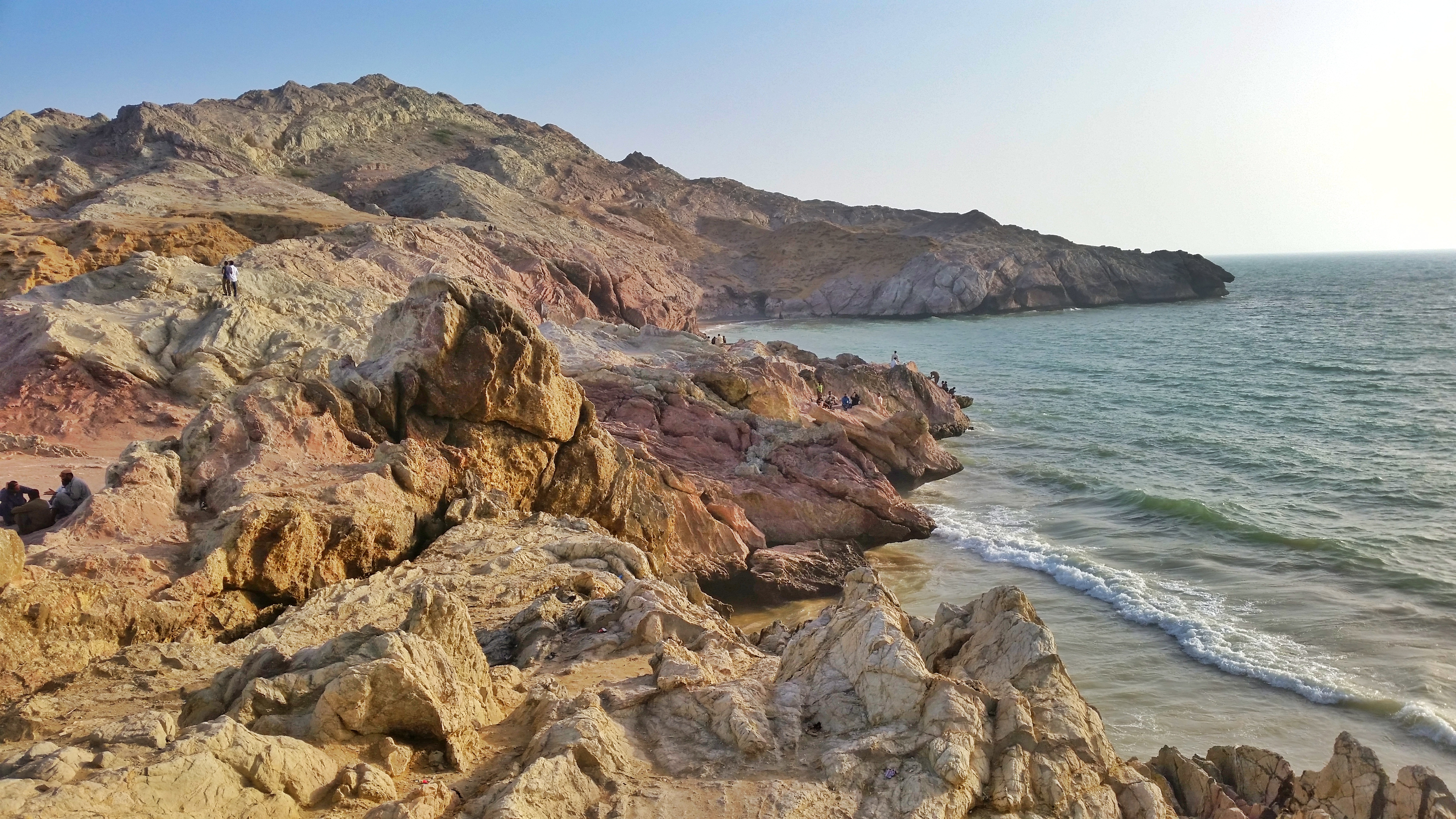
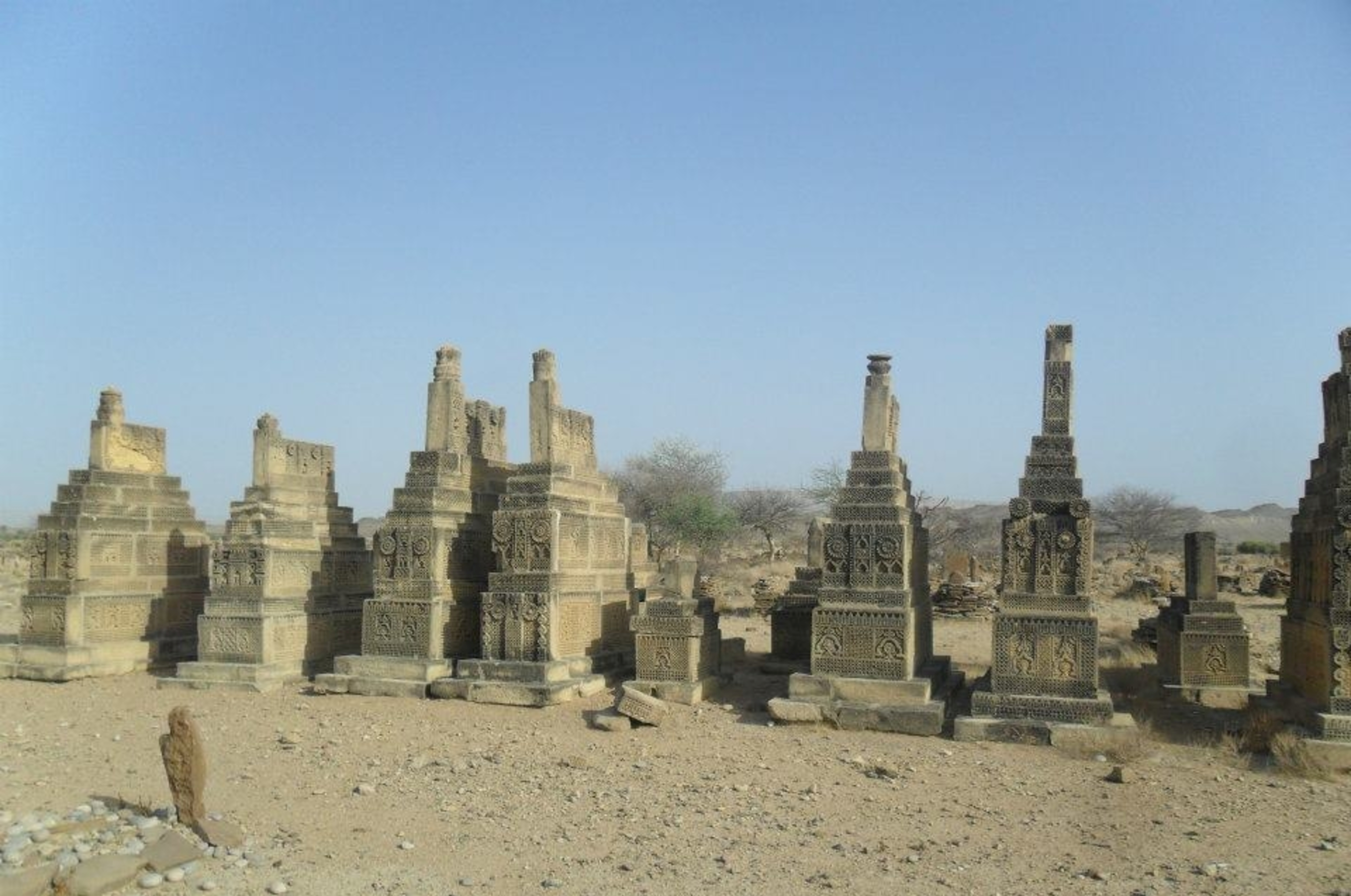
- Top: Gadani Beach; Bottom: Hanidan Tombs

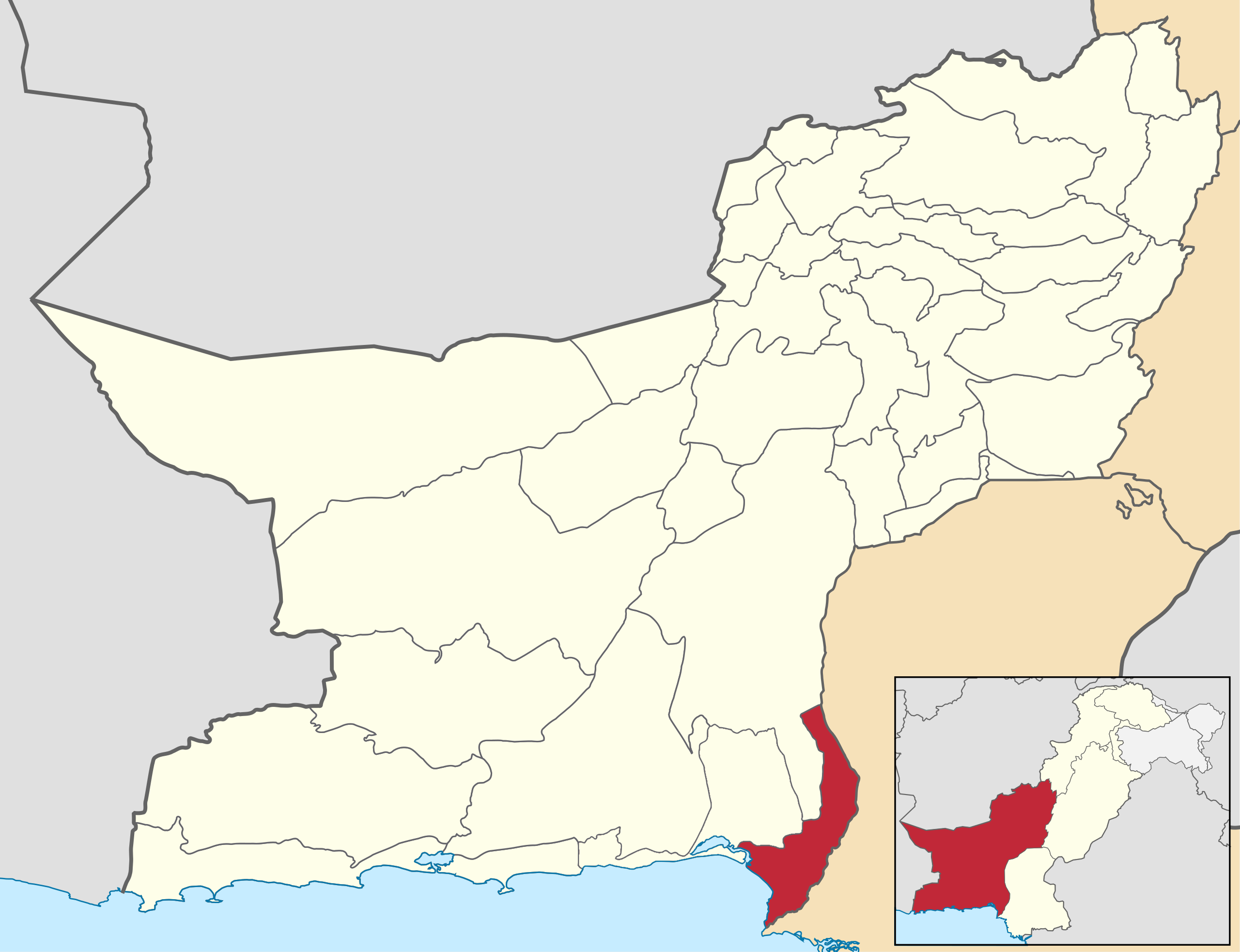
- Map of Balochistan with Hub District highlighted
- Country: Pakistan
- Province: Balochistan
- Division: Lasbela
- Established: 2022
- Headquarters: Hub

Government
  - Type: District Administration
  - Deputy Commissioner: Rohana Gul Kakar
  - District Police Officer: N/A
  - District Health Officer: Dr Noor Bux Bezanjo

Area
  - Total: 6,716 km^{2} (2,593 sq mi)

Population (2023)
  - Total: 382,885
  - Density: 57.01/km^{2} (147.7/sq mi)
  - Urban: 195,661 (51.10%)
  - Rural: 37,782 (48.90%)

Literacy
  - Literacy rate: Total: (44.35%); Male: (53.87%); Female: (34.34%)
- Time zone: UTC+5 (PKT)

Hub District (Balochi, Lasi, Urdu: ضِلع حَب) is a coastal administrative district located in the southern part of Balochistan Province of Pakistan. The district was created after bifurcation of Lasbela District in 2022.

Hub district is bordered by Arabian sea to the south, Lasbela district to the west, Karachi division to the southeast, Dadu district to the northeast, Jamshoro district to the east, and Khuzdar to the north and northwest.

Its Provincial Assembly seat is PB-21 and National Assembly seat is NA-257 shared with the districts Awaran and Lasbela.

Sardar Muhammad Saleh Bhootani confirmed that the creation of Hub District is a long-standing demand of his people of PB-49 constituency and he thanked chief minister of Balochistan Abdul Quddus Bizenjo for approving the creation of this district.

== Administrative divisions ==
The district of Hub is administratively divided in five tehsils as:

Tehsil	Area (km²)	Pop. (2023)	Density (ppl/km²) (2023)	Literacy rate (2023)	Union Councils
Gadani Tehsil	419	29,215	69.73	48.57%	Gadani
Sonmiani Tehsil	2,616	67,991	25.99	35.80%	Sonmiani Winder
Hub Tehsil	868	233,443	268.94	44.35%	Allahabad Pathra Barot
Sakran Tehsil	...	...	...	...	Sakran
Dureji Tehsil	2,813	52,236	18.57	15.58%	Dureji Lohi

== Demographics ==
Historical population
Year	Pop.	±% p.a.
1951	...	—
1961	31,075	—
1972	49,094	+4.25%
1981	73,256	+4.55%
1998	163,194	+4.82%
2017	339,640	+3.93%
2023	382,885	+2.02%

=== Population ===
According to 2023 population census, the district had a population of 382,885. However, At the time of the 2017 census, Hub district had 49,449 households and a population of 339,640. Hub had a sex ratio of 913 females per 1000 males and a literacy rate of 35.90% - 45.37% for males and 25.49% for females. 227,872 (67.09%) lived in urban areas. 105,437 (31.04%) were under 10 years of age.

=== Religion ===
Religions in Hub district (2017)
Religion	Percent
Islam	97.93%
Hinduism	1.67%
Other or not stated	0.40%

In the 2017 census, Islam was the predominant religion with 97.93%, while Hindus were 1.67% of the population.

=== Language ===
Languages of Hub district (2017)
1. Balochi (58.3%)
2. Sindhi (18.5%)
3. Brahui (15.8%)
4. Pashto (4.08%)
5. Saraiki (1.22%)
6. Others (2.08%)

At the time of the 2017 census, 58.31% of the population spoke Balochi, 18.51% Sindhi, 15.80% Brahui, 4.08% Pashto and 1.22% Saraiki as their first language.

== Old Hub Canal ==
As of 13 August 2025, Old Hub Canal is under renovation. At this time it was almost 50 years old, and suffered leaks.

== New Hub Canal ==
On 13 August 2025, Bilawal Bhutto inaugurated the New Hub Canal. Capacity of the new canal is 100 MGD (million gallons per day), while canal supply water from Hub Dam to Karachi. The canal will serve people in Keamari District and Karachi West. The cost of New Canal is Rs 12.8 billion.

== See also ==
- Hub Dam
- Hub Industrial & Trading Estate
- Hub River
- Divisions of Pakistan
  - Divisions of Balochistan
- Districts in Balochistan
  - Districts of Balochistan
- Tehsils of Pakistan
  - Tehsils of Balochistan
