= Hub Dam Wildlife Sanctuary =

Protected area in Sindh and Balochistan, Pakistan

- IUCN category IV (habitat/species management area)
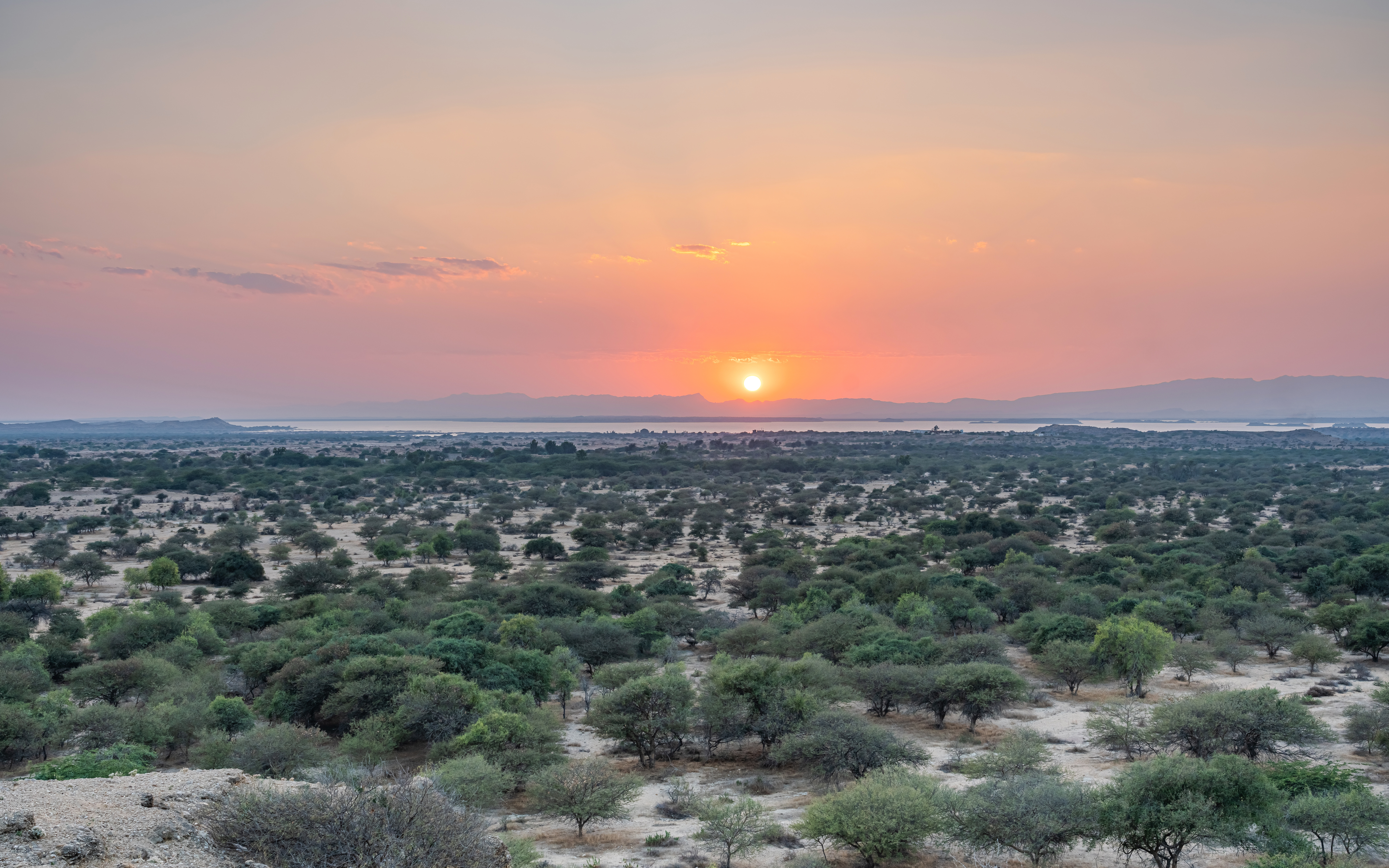

- Location within Pakistan
- Coordinates: 25.2680°N 67.1880°E

Hub Dam Wildlife Sanctuary is located around Hub Dam in Balochistan and Sindh Provinces of Pakistan. The greater part of this wildlife sanctuary in Balochistan is unprotected; the eastern shore and area south of the dam in Sindh are protected in the Kirthar National Park and Hub Dam Wildlife Sanctuary, respectively. The lake formed by the dam covers an area of 32 m^{2} (340 sq ft). There is plenty of waterfowl in the lake, both resident and migratory. The surrounding hills harbour urial, Sindh ibex, four-horned antelope, chinkara, golden jackal, Bengal fox, Indian pangolin and numerous birds and reptiles.
