= Cnergyico =

Petroleum refinery in Pakistan

Cnergyico Pk Limited
- Native name: سنرجیکو پاکستان محدود
- Formerly: Bosicor Pakistan Limited; Byco Petroleum Pakistan Limited
- Type: Public
- Traded as: PSX: CNERGY; KSE 100 component
- Industry: Petroleum
- Founded: 1995; 31 years ago
- Founder: Parvez Abbasi
- Headquarters: Karachi, Pakistan
- Area served: Pakistan
- Key people: Uzma Abbassciy (chairperson)
- Products: see below
- Revenue: ▲ Rs. 193.912 billion (US$690 million) (2023)
- Operating income: ▲ Rs. −6.578 billion (US$−24 million) (2023)
- Net income: ▼ Rs. −13.617 billion (US$−49 million) (2023)
- Total assets: ▲ Rs. 365.244 billion (US$1.3 billion) (2023)
- Total equity: ▲ Rs. 186.613 billion (US$670 million) (2023)
- Number of employees: 725 (2023)
- Website: cnergyico.com
- Footnotes; Financials as of 30 June 2023

Cnergyico Pk Limited, formerly Byco Petroleum Pakistan Limited and Bosicor Pakistan Limited, is a Pakistani petroleum refinery based in Karachi. It is a subsidiary of the Mauritian company Cnergyico Industries Incorporated.

Cnergyico operates the largest oil refinery based in Hub, Balochistan, a network of petrol pumps, and a crude oil terminal, single point mooring.

== History ==
Cnergyico was formed by the father-son-duo of Parvez Abbasi and Amir Abbassciy on January 9, 1995, and was granted a certificate of commencement of business on March 13, 1995. It was initially called Bosicor Pakistan Limited.

In 2001, Bosicor began construction of its first refinery (ORC-1) and a year later, it was listed on the Karachi Stock Exchange. It began commercial production on July 1, 2004. The refining capacity was initially 18,000 barrels per day which was later increased to 36,000 barrels per day.

The company opened its first petrol pump in June 2007 near Sukkur. A year later, the company began construction of 120,000 barrels per day oil refinery (ORC-II). In 2009, the company developed the largest capacity Storage Tanks in Pakistan. In early 2010, the company changed its name from Bosicor Pakistan Limited to Byco Petroleum Pakistan Limited. Byco Petroleum started working on the Single Point Mooring and Pipeline network project in 2010 and the project was launched in 2012. The Single Point Mooring (SPM) oil terminal was deployed in the deep sea off the coast of Balochistan. This allowed Byco Petroleum to directly import crude oil for its oil refineries, without relying on other ports that frequently experience congestion and delivery delays. In December 2012, the first oil vessel, M.T ARIETIS, carrying 70,000 tons of crude oil, delivered its cargo to Byco Petroleum through the SPM.

In 2012, Byco's second oil refinery (ORC-II) began commercial operations. By 2017, both oil refineries became fully operational, making Byco Petroleum the largest oil refiner in Pakistan with a total installed capacity of 156,000 barrels per day. In the same year, the company opened its 300th petrol pump and the SPM achieved a milestone of handling 5 million metric tons of oil since its inception. In 2018, Byco Petroleum commissioned the Catalytic Reformer at ORC-II to produce higher octane fuels. In 2021, Byco Petroleum started working on the Upgrade-1 project to expand and modernize its operations. In late 2021, Byco Petroleum got renamed to Cnergyico Pk Limited. The word Cnergyico has been derived from Chemical Energy Integrated Company.

== Company overview ==
Cnergyico is based in Karachi, Pakistan. It works in oil refining, petroleum marketing, and petroleum logistics business in Pakistan. It is traded on the Pakistan Stock Exchange .

Cnergyico operates a network of more than 475 petrol pumps located in all the major cities, towns, and highways of Pakistan. Upon completion of the acquisition of Puma Energy, Cnergyico will become the largest fuel retailer of Pakistan in the private sector with a retail network of approximately 1,000 petrol pumps. Whereas the State-owned Pakistan State Oil Co. has 3,500 petrol pumps, Total Parco Pakistan Ltd. has 800 petrol pumps and Shell Pakistan Ltd. has 766 petrol pumps.

Cnergyico owns and operates Pakistan's largest oil refining complex in terms of design capacity of 156,000 barrels per day. Cnergyico alone accounts for 37% of Pakistan's total oil refining capacity of approximately 420,000 barrels per day. The company's oil refining complex is located near the city of Hub in the Balochistan province. The complex houses two oil refining units ORC-1 and ORC-II, crude oil and petroleum products storage facilities, and other related energy infrastructure assets. Cnergyico also owns a petrochemical plant at the oil refining complex that can produce petrochemical products such as Benzene, Mixed Xylene, and Para Xylene.

Cnergyico is the nation's only firm having a dedicated Single Point Mooring (SPM). Cnergyico's SPM the first and only liquid port in the country. The SPM is Pakistan’s third terminal used for importing crude oil and liquid petroleum products, besides Karachi Port Trust (KPT) and Fauji Oil Terminal (Fotco). Cnergyico began working on the SPM project in 2010 and installed it in 2012 to avoid problems of congestion at KPT and Fotco. The SPM is situated in the deep sea, roughly 15 km away from Cnergyico’s oil refining complex. It connects with the onshore oil storage facilities through 11.5 km offshore and 3.3 km onshore 28-inch pipelines. Unlike other ports in Pakistan, the SPM can handle Very Large Crude Carriers (“VLCC”s) of up to 250,000 DWT. The SPM received Pakistan’s largest-ever shipment of crude oil of 102,000 metric tons in 2017. The SPM is Pakistan's only terminal having a tier 3 oil spill response membership.

Cnergyico actively supports the development of a coral reef around its subsea oil pipeline to enhance the region’s marine biodiversity. The coral reef situated between the SPM and Cnergyico’s oil refining complex is a rare marine habitat found in Pakistani waters.

Cnergyico refines crude oil into various components including Liquefied Petroleum Gas, Light Naphtha, Heavy Naphtha, High Octane Blending Component, Motor Gasoline, Kerosene, Jet Fuels, High Speed Diesel and Furnace Oil. Having operated as a low complexity refinery since inception, it is upgrading to produce more products, with reduced sulphur content, in diesel and convert furnace oil into gasoline and diesel. Cnergyico's marketing network supports retail outlets in more than 100 cities all over Pakistan and is an emerging player. Cnergyico aims to become the first refinery in Pakistan by upgrading its facilities to ensure environmental compliance.

== Acquisition ==
Cnergyico Pk Ltd acquiring 57.37 per cent shares of Puma Energy Pakistan (link is incorrect) and has become the country’s second-largest fuel retailer.

== Products ==
- Liquid fuels
- Gasoline
- Jet fuel
- Ultra winterized diesel
- Furnace oil
- Compressed natural gas (CNG)
- Liquefied petroleum gas (LPG)
- Lubricants
