= Mubarak Goth =

Mubarak Goth مبارک گوٹھ
- Village
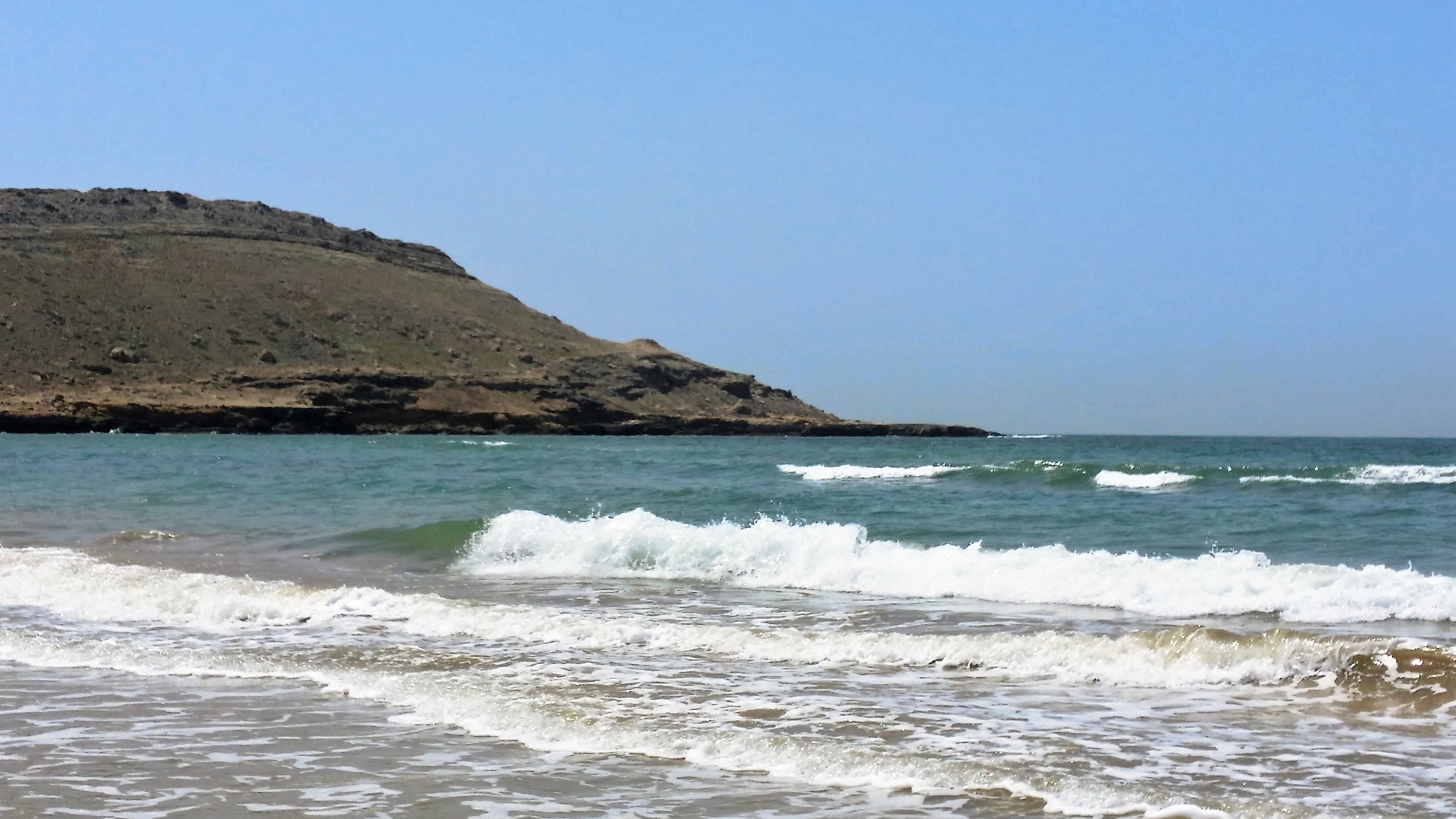
- A view of Mubarak Village

- Location in Pakistan Mubarak Goth مبارک گوٹھ (Pakistan)
- Country: Pakistan
- Province: Sindh
- District: Keamari District
- Time zone: UTC+5 (PST)

Mubarak Goth or Mubarak Village (Urdu: مبارک گوٹھ) is a fishing village in Kiamari Town in Karachi, Sindh, Pakistan. It is located along the shore of Arabian Sea in Keamari District.

== Demography ==
The village is 30 kilometres (19 mi) away from the city centre with a population of more than 10,000 people.

== Fishing village ==
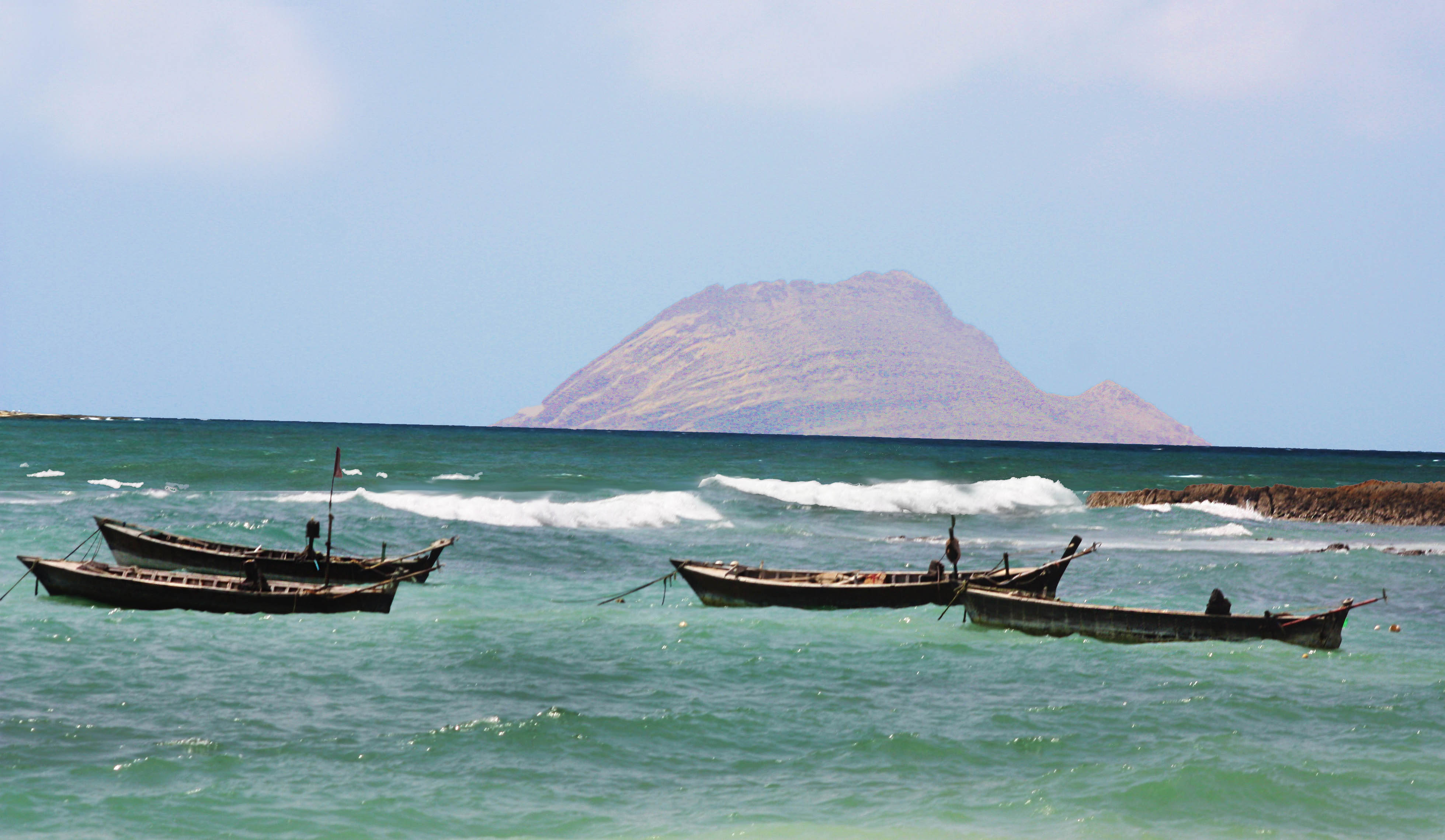
A view of fishing boats in Mubarak Village, Karachi

Karachi's second largest fishermen locality of Mubarak Village does not have basic facilities including jetty, gas, health and education, despite the fact that it had existed even before the independence of Pakistan. Most of the local people are involved in fisheries. The major economic activity in the village is fishing, followed by construction and community, social, and personal services.

These neglected fishermen, whose forefathers had been living here for nearly 200 years, lack all basic amenities: they do not have any pier or jetty to offload their fish catch, nor they have access to clean water, education and health facilities. Recently, a maternity home's building was also constructed by the city district government. Despite persistent demand by the people, no medical officer has been appointed so far. There are, however, no arrangements for dealing with emergency cases, particularly maternity cases.

In 2009, Chief Minister Qaim Ali Shah had announced to develop Mubarak Village on modern lines and construction work was started there. The government installed electricity facilities, erected poles, started work on sewerage, education, healthcare and other projects of basic amenities in the area. After fifty percent work of the projects, the government stopped development work aborting the model village plan without any justification Now in half of the area, poles, PMTs, electric wires, etc. are installed to supply power to residents while the rest is still awaiting the government s response to have infrastructure for basic amenities.

== Mubarak Village Weather ==
Mubarak Village Beach, typically experiences a mild climate year-round, with the exception of notably harsh winters. Historical records do not indicate occurrences of severe storms affecting this coastal area.

The coastline around Mubarak Village Beach undergoes regular fluctuations between high and low tides throughout the year. Due to these changing conditions, visitors planning to swim are advised to consult the weather forecast to ensure safety during their activities.

== Water Sports ==
Churna Island is an hour away from the Mubarak Village, which have become a center of attraction for the water sports. The popularity of water sports and other activities brought the employment and revenue for the locals at some extent.

== Oil Spill from Churna Island to Mubarak Village ==
In October 2018 the fishermen of Mubarak Village could not ply their trade for weeks because of an oil spill along the coastal belt of Karachi. The spill caused major environmental hazards in the area. The federal, Sindh and Balochistan governments set up committees to probe the incident but to date, have failed to determine the cause. This has badly affected fishermen's livelihood. Since the incident, fishermen have been unable to catch fish as the spill has badly damaged marine life and are only getting one meal per day. The provincial and federal governments should have launched a rehabilitation programme for the community, but they did not pay any attention in this regard.
