= Hub Tehsil =

Pakistani administrative area

Hub Balochi: تحصیل حب
- Tehsil of Hub District
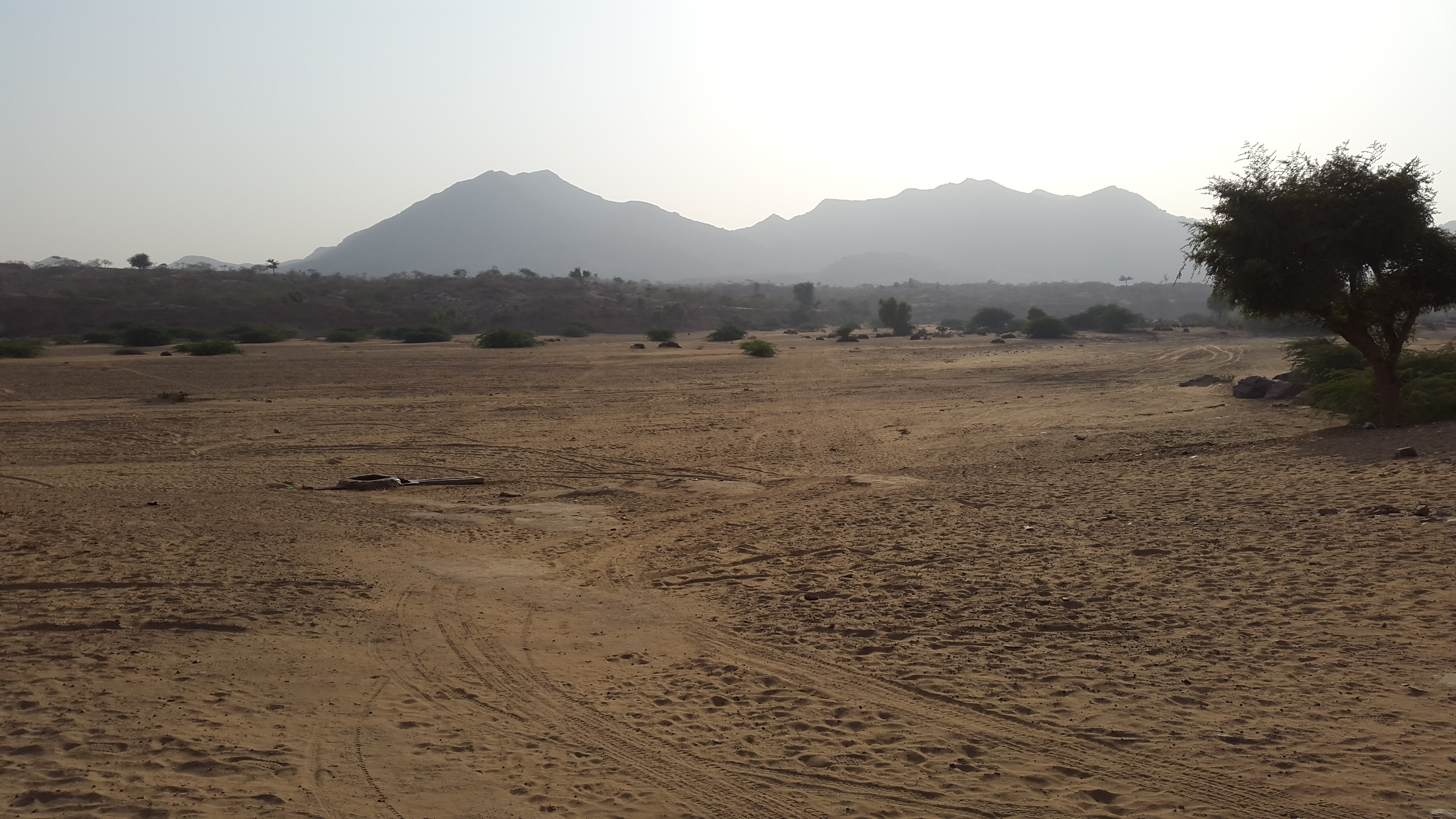
- Rural landscape of Hub Tehsil

- Location within Balochistan, Pakistan Location within Pakistan
- Coordinates: 25°02′0″N 66°53′0″E
- Country: Pakistan
- Province: Balochistan
- District: Hub District
- Headquarter: Hub

Area
  - Tehsil of Hub District: 868 km^{2} (335 sq mi)

Population (2023)
  - Tehsil of Hub District: 233,443
  - Density: 268.94/km^{2} (696.6/sq mi)
  - Urban: 195,661 (83.82%)
  - Rural: 37,782 (16.18%)

Literacy
  - Literacy rate: 44.35%
- Time zone: UTC+5 (PST)
- Main languages: 159,481 Balochi, 23,405 Sindhi, 10,014 Pashto

Hub, also known as Hub Chowki, (Note: Balochi: حب چوکی, Urdu: حب, pronounced [/hʌb/]) is an administrative subdivision (tehsil) of Hub District in Balochistan, Pakistan. According to the 2023 census, it has a population of 233,443, with over 80% living in urban areas, including the administrative centre, the city of Hub. Formerly part of Lasbela District, Hub became part of the newly established Hub District in 2022 following administrative reforms. The district comprises the tehsils Hub, Dureji, Gadani, Sakran, and Sonmiani, Hub Tehsil is divided into seven Union Councils.

== Location ==
Hub tehsil covers an area of approximately 868 square kilometres and is situated along the northwestern banks of the Hub River. The geography features the arid and hilly terrain typically of much of Balochistan, with limited patches of arable land supporting small-scale agriculture. It borders Gadani to the southwest, Sonmiani to the northwest, and Dureji to the north, while across the Hub River to the south and east lie the Sindh districts of Malir and Keamari.

== Population ==
Historical population
Year	Pop.	±% p.a.
1951	...	—
1961	9,042	—
1972	10,391	+1.27%
1981	14,477	+3.75%
1998	80,934	+10.65%
2017	205,487	+5.03%
2023	233,443	+2.15%
Sources:Source: Pakistan Bureau of Statistics:

According to the 2023 national census, Hub tehsil has is home to 233,443 residents across 37,994 households, 30,139 in urban areas and 7,855 are in rural settings. The tehsil has a predominantly urban character, with the majority of the population residing in the town of Hub, its administrative headquarters.

The overall literacy rate stands at 44.35%, with a male literacy rate of 53.87% and a female literacy rate of 34.34%, highlighting ongoing disparities in educational access, particularly for women.

== Economy ==
Hub's proximity to Karachi, just across the Sindh border, has made it one of Balochistan's leading industrial centres. Industrial development began in 1979 with the allocation of 1,326 acres (5.37 km^{2}) for industrial, commercial, and residential use, including 700 acres for industrial estates. The Lasbela Industrial Estate Development Authority (LIEDA), established in 1986, regulates these zones, with around 135 units under LIEDA and over 200 industrial units operating in total. Joint industrial parks developed by the Sindh and Balochistan governments continue to attract investment, particularly from Karachi.

Key industries include oil and energy (Byco Petroleum, Bosicor Oil Refineries, and HUBCO Power Project), cement (DG Khan Cement Company's 9,000 tons-per-day Hub Plant) and services such as textiles, IT, and telecommunications.

Hub's industrial importance is expected to grow with the China–Pakistan Economic Corridor (CPEC), which will improve infrastructure and trade connectivity.

Despite its economic role, the city faces urban congestion, weak municipal services, and political rivalry, which periodically disrupt governance and industrial activity.
