= Lasi dialect =

Dialect of Sindhi spoken in Pakistan

Lasi
- لاسي
- Native to: Pakistan
- Region: Balochistan (Lasbela)
- Ethnicity: Lasi
- Native speakers: 15,000 (2020)
- Language family: Indo-European: Indo-Iranian; Indo-Aryan; Northwestern; Sindhic; Jadgali–Lasi; Lasi
- Writing system: Arabic script (Naskh, Nastaliq)

Language codes
- ISO 639-3: lss
- Glottolog: lasi1242

Lasi (Sindhi: لاسي) is a dialect of the Sindhi language spoken on the western frontier of Sindh and Balochistan in Pakistan. It is spoken by the Lasi people in the Lasbela, Hub and Gwadar districts in Balochistan. Lasi is also spoken in the Kirthar region of Karachi, Thatta and Jamshoro districts of Sindh.

== Loanwords ==
Lasi is known to use loanwords from other languages, primarily from Persian as well as Balochi.

== Orthography ==
Lasi uses the same orthography as Sindhi except an extra letter, ۏ, which has been added to the Balochi Standard Alphabet. Many educated Lasi speakers use the Latin alphabet in an effort to romanise the language.
