= Hub River =

River in Balochistan and Sindh, Pakistan

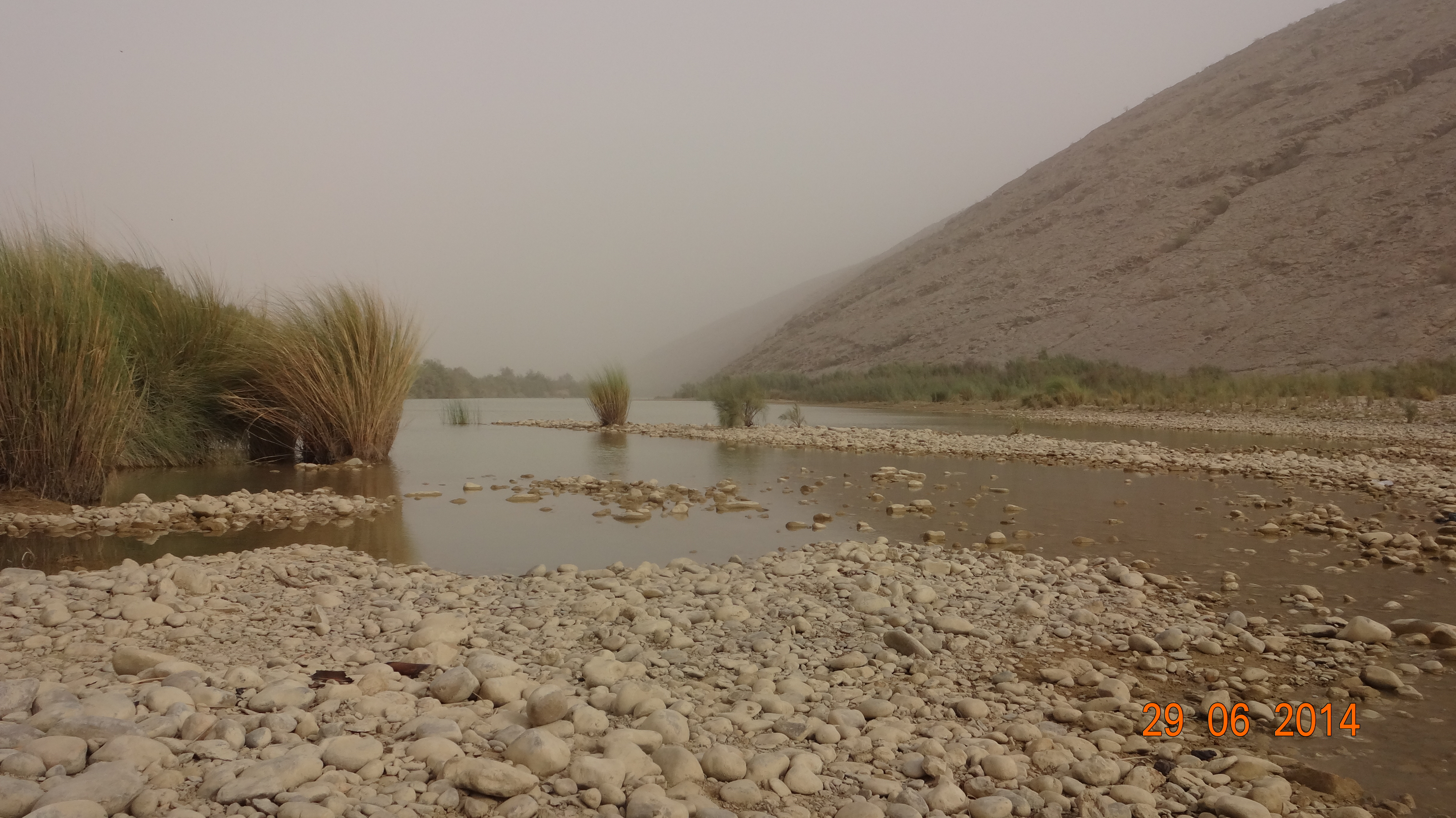

- Location within Pakistan
- Native name: دریائے حب (Urdu)

Location
- Country: Pakistan
- Provinces: Balochistan, Sindh
- Cities: Lasbela (Balochistan); Mubarak Goth (Sindh)

Physical characteristics
- Source
  - coordinates: 27°22′50.79″N 66°35′14″E
- Mouth: Arabian Sea
  - elevation: 0 m (0 ft)
- Length: 134 km (83 mi)
- Basin size: 9,968.4 km^{2} (3,848.8 mi^{2})
- Discharge
  - location: Near mouth
  - average: (Period: 1971–2000)15.7 m^{3}/s (550 cu ft/s)

Basin features
- Progression: Arabian Sea
- River system: Hub River

The Hub River (Urdu: دریائے حب), also spelled Hab, is located in the Hub District of Balochistan, Pakistan. It originates in the Kirthar Mountains, drains a catchment area of about 34 square miles (88 km^{2}) and flows into the Arabian Sea just west of Karachi, the capital of Pakistan.

The ancient Greek historian Arrian called it Arabius and recorded that Alexander the Great crossed the Arabius with his army to conquer the Oreitans.

The Hub Dam Reservoir, created by the Hub Dam on the river, is the primary water source for Karachi, and also irrigates Lasbela District. The Hub Dam Wildlife Sanctuary, covering 27,219 hectares (67,260 acres), was created in 1972 by the government of the province of Sindh. On 1 May 2001, Hub Dam was designated a Ramsar site.

== Hub Dam and Reservoir ==
The Hub Dam is an earth-fill dam on the Hub River on the border between the Pakistani provinces of Sindh and Balochistan, 56 kilometres (35 mi) northeast of Karachi. Construction started in 1963 and finished in 1980 or 1981. The reservoir is entirely rain-fed, covers 24,300 acres (9,800 ha), with a gross storage capacity of 857,000 acre-feet (1.057×10^{9} m^{3}), and is the primary source of water for Karachi.

== Flora and fauna ==
"Open forest dominated by Olea ferruginea and Acacia senegal" grows around the dam.

It is "an important staging and wintering ground" "for grebes, pelicans, ducks, cranes and coots."

In a 2012 study, 24 mammal and 25 reptile species were found. Mammals included:

- urial (Ovis vignei)
- chinkara/Indian gazelle (Gazella bennettii)
- jungle cat (Felis chaus)
- wild goat/Sindh ibex (Capra aegagrus)
- Indian hedgehog (Paraechinus micropus)
- Cape hare (Lepus capensis)
- little Indian field mouse (Mus booduga)
- house shrew (Sorex thibetanus)
- Balochistan gerbil (Gerbillus nanus)
- Indian gerbil (Tatera indica)

Reptiles included:

- common krait (Bungarus caeruleus)
- warty rock gecko (Cyrtodactylus kachhensis kachhensis)
- banded dwarf gecko (Tropiocolotes helenae)
- crocodile

The mahseer (Tor putitora), a favorite of sport fishers that can grow up to 2 metres (6 ft 7 in) in length, is a fish indigenous to the river.

== Power plant ==
The estuary of the Hub River is the site of Pakistan's first private power project. The plant has four generating units, rated at 323 MW gross output each.

== See also ==
- Hub District
- Hub Tehsil
- Hub, Balochistan
- Hub Industrial & Trading Estate
