= List of volcanoes in Pakistan =

This is a list of active and extinct volcanoes in Pakistan. Most of these are mud volcanoes, rather than the conventional magmatic type. These include a "dramatic group of mud volcanoes" known as the Chandragup Complex, located in Hingol National Park along the Arabian Sea coast of Pakistan.

| Name | Elevation | | Location | Last eruption |
| Name | meters | feet | Coordinates | Last eruption |
|---|---|---|---|---|
| Koh-i-Sultan (Extinct magmatic) | - | - | - | - |
| Malan Island (Mud volcano) | - | - | - | - |
| Neza e Sultan (Extinct magmatic) | - | - | - | - |
| Jebel e Ghurab (Mud volcano) | - | - | - | - |
| Chandragup (Mud volcano) | - | - | - | - |
| Hingol (Mud volcano) | - | - | - | - |
| Tor Zawar (Fissure vent) | - | - | - | 2010 |
| Gwadar New Small Island (Mud volcano) | - | - | - | 2013 |
| Kansuri (Extinct Volcano cone(koh-i-sultan) | - | - | - | - |
| Abu (Extinct Volcano cone(koh-i-sultan) | - | - | - | - |
| Miri (Extinct Volcano cone(koh-i-sultan) | - | - | - | - |
