= Princess of Hope =

Rock formation in Balochistan, Pakistan

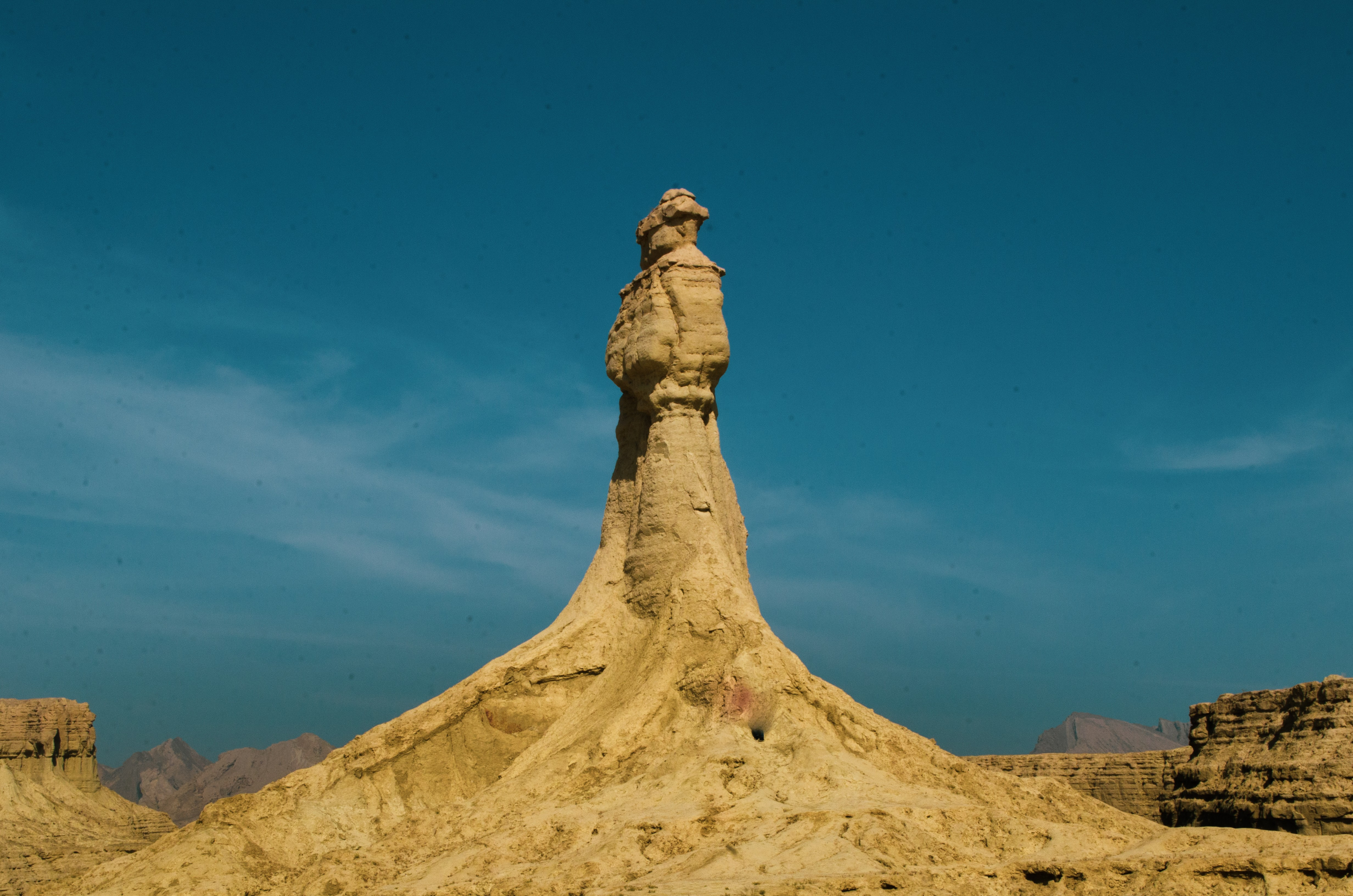
- The "Princess of Hope", Hingol National Park

- Location within Balochistan, Pakistan Location within Pakistan
- Location: Hingol National Park; Lasbela, Balochistan, Pakistan
- Coordinates: 25.430937°N 65.302782°E
- Governing body: Government of Pakistan

The Princess of Hope (Urdu: شاهزاده خانم امید ; Balochi: شہزادی امید .) is a natural rock formation in the Hingol National Park of Lasbela in Balochistan, Pakistan. It is of the type known as a hoodoo or "fairy chimney" and which could fancifully be construed (see mimetolith) as resembling a crowned and skirted female figure looking toward the horizon. It is situated approximately 190 km (120 mi) from Pakistan's financial hub, Karachi, and approximately 717 km (446 mi) from the provincial capital, Quetta.

The curiously shaped rock pinnacle is located in the Hingol National Park in the Lasbela District of the province of Balochistan, the mountainous landscape of which is riven with picturesque gorges and features unusual formations of mud and rock, shaped into their present forms by the forces of erosion. Lasbela District forms part of the coastal strip known as the Makran, which also takes in certain coastal regions of Iran.

The formation was given the name Princess of Hope by Hollywood actress Angelina Jolie, who visited Pakistan - including the Hingol National Park - in the year 2002 as a UN Goodwill Ambassador. The name (conceived by Jolie on the spot as a spontaneous, personal reaction to the form of the monolith) stuck, having evidently appealed to then-current local sensibilities.

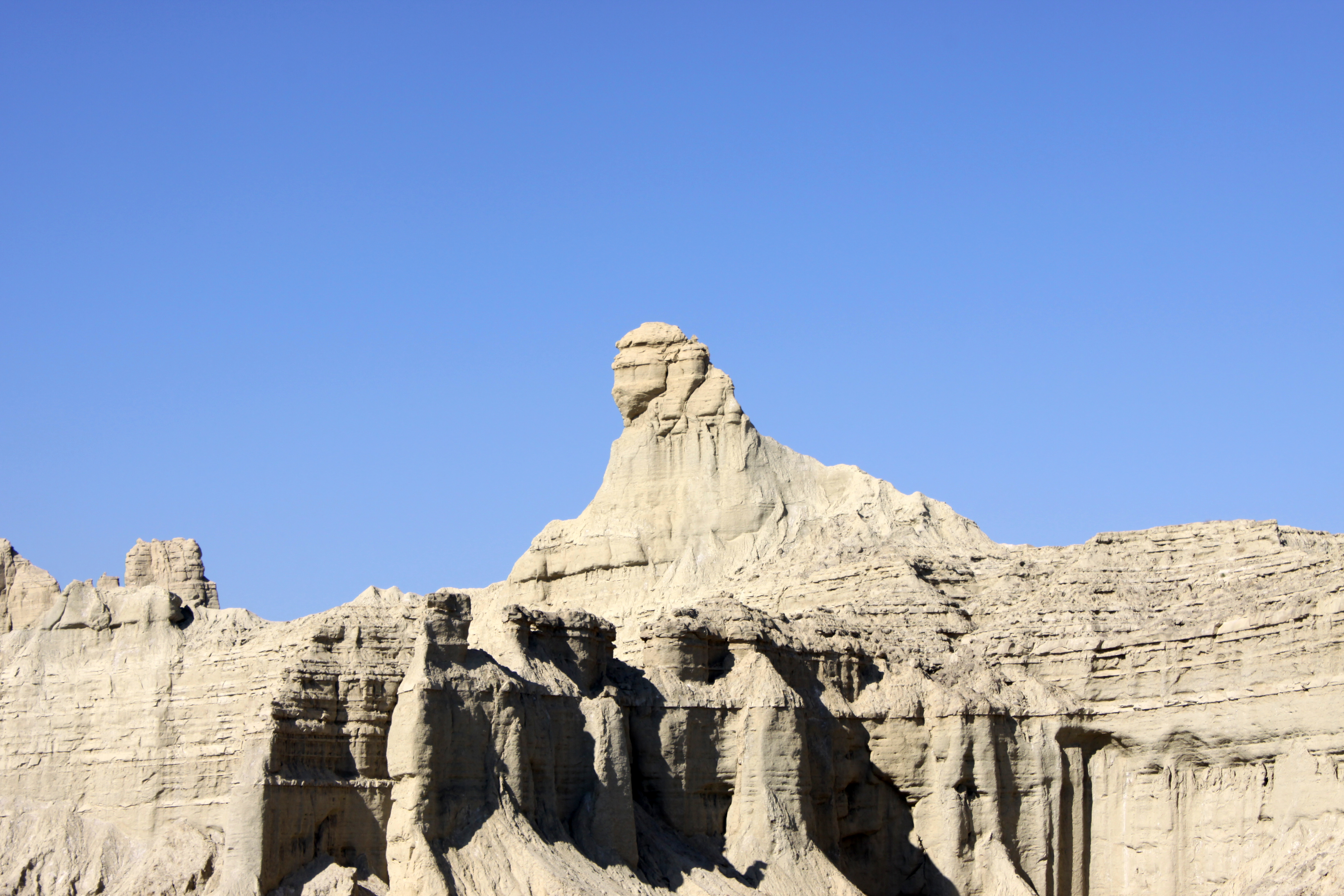
The "Balochistan Sphinx"

Not far from the "Princess" stands another natural rock formation of sphinx-like form, the so-called "Balochistan Sphinx" (known also as the "Lion of Balochistan" or Abul-Hol) which is visible from the Buzi Pass section of the Makran Coastal Highway.

== See also ==
- Neza e Sultan, another rock formation in Balochistan
- The Balochistan Sphinx
