= Patange =

Patange or Patangey or Pathange or Pathangey is a surname prevalent among the people of Bhavsar caste, a sub-caste of Marathas predominant in the state of Maharashtra and Gujarat who have spread to the states of Andhra Pradesh, Tamil Nadu & Karnataka, during the times of Chhatrapati Shivaji Maharaj, along with other Bhavsar people. But we can also see this surname in the Bhandari caste, a caste predominant in the state of Goa and Konkan part of Maharashtra.
