= Kalmat Naval Base =

- Part of Pakistan Navy
- Kalmat, Balochistan, Pakistan

Site information
- Type: Naval base
- Owner: Pakistan Navy
- Controlled by: Pakistan Navy

Kalmat Naval Base is a proposed naval base of the Pakistan Navy at Khor Kalmat, Balochistan, Pakistan.

== Location ==
Khor Kalmat is a lagoon located on the Makran coast of Balochistan. The Basol River drains into the Khor Kalmat lagoon. Kalmat lies about 350 km west of Karachi; the area is 20 km from the Makran Coastal Highway. The geographical coordinates of Khor Kalmat are N 25° 24' 32 E 64° 4' 37.

== See also ==
- Jinnah Naval Base
- PNS Ahsan
- PNS Makran
- PNS Mehran
- PNS Qasim
- Karachi Naval Dockyard
- Karachi Shipyard
