= Khor Kalmat =

Lagoon in Balochistan, Pakistan

Kalmat Hor
- Kalmat Khor
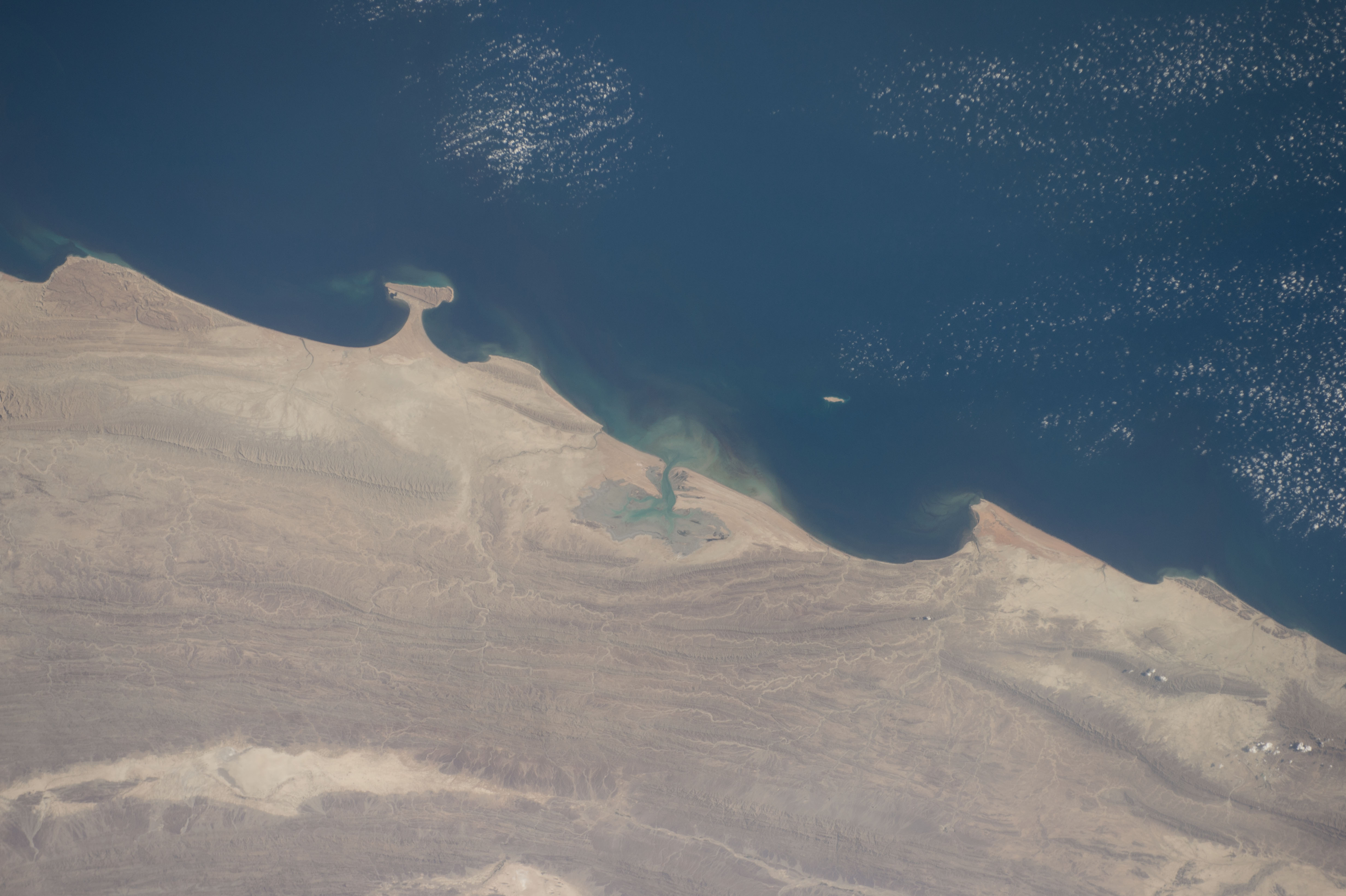
- View from north to south with Khor Kalmat (Kalmat Hor) at the centre, taken from the International Space Station (ISS)
- Interactive map of Kalmat Hor
- Location: Pasni Tehsil, Balochistan
- Coordinates: 25°24′N 64°06′E
- Type: Saltwater lagoon and wetland
- Primary outflows: Arabian Sea, northern Indian Ocean
- Basin countries: Pakistan
- Max. length: 19.0 kilometres (11.8 mi)
- Max. width: 27.0 kilometres (16.8 mi)
- Surface area: 102.25 square kilometres (39.48 sq mi)
- Average depth: 12.0 m (39.4 ft)
- Max. depth: 23.0 m (75.5 ft)
- Surface elevation: 0 m (0 ft)

Kalmat Hor (Balochi: کلمت کھور, pronounced [kəlˈmət xoːɾ]), also referred to as Kalmat Khor, is a saltwater lagoon situated along the Makran coast in Balochistan, Pakistan. It is recognised for its unique tree-like shape when viewed from above, with a narrow tidal channel opening into a broad lagoon. The water body forms part of the Arabian Sea's coastal ecosystem and is of ecological, environmental, and economic significance. (Note: A study assessing the tidal energy potential of Khor Kalmat concluded that the site is suitable for the installation of bidirectional Venturi-Enhanced Turbine Technology (VETT) systems. The analysis estimates that such an installation could generate approximately 269.93 megawatts of tidal power, highlighting the site's potential for renewable energy development.)

== Geography ==
The lagoon lies between the towns of Ormara and Pasni, within Pasni Tehsil, and is accessible via the National Highway 10 (Makran Coastal Highway). The Kalmat Hor channel is approximately 7 kilometres (4.3 mi) long, 2 kilometres (1.2 mi) wide, and about 20 meters deep. This constricted channel opens into a much broader body of water measuring roughly 19 kilometres (12 mi) in length and 27 kilometres (17 mi) in width, giving the lagoon an irregular shape with a total surface area of approximately 102.25 km². Astola Island is located 30 kilometres (19 mi) offshore from the lagoon.

Kalmat Hor is a tidal lagoon that fully forms during high tide, as seawater from the Arabian Sea flows through the narrow channel into the basin. Additionally, the Basol River drains into the lagoon, feeding its mudflats, salt flats, and tidal creeks. Hor (or horr) is a Balochi word for a water channel.

== Ecology ==
Kalmat Hor hosts mangroves primarily of the species Avicennia marina, covering an estimated 407 ha (4.07 km^{2}). The lagoon is part of the Buzi Makola Wildlife Sanctuary and is one of three sites in Balochistan that support mangrove ecosystems, the others being Miani Hor (4,018 ha (40.18 km^{2})) and Jiwani Coastal Wetland (235 ha (2.35 km^{2})). The mangroves of Kalmat Hor are mostly stunted and degraded due to prolonged drought conditions and lack of freshwater inflow from dried-up natural channels and springs.

== Settlements and demographics ==
There are four main settlements around Kalmat Hor: Kalmat, Chundi, Gursant, and Makola, encompassing a total of eleven villages. The region is characterised by a rural, semi-tribal structure, with a population of approximately 2,000 people. The majority belong to the Kalmati, Sanghoor, and Jaurak Baloch tribes, who have inhabited the area for centuries.

About 95% of the local population is involved in fishing. The community faces severe socio-economic challenges including poverty, limited healthcare and educational infrastructure, lack of access to clean drinking water, unreliable electricity, and declining fish and shrimp stocks. Contributing factors to the decline include the use of destructive fishing nets by non-local fishermen and unsustainable practices by foreign trawlers. Local fishermen are reported to abstain from such methods. Due to low rainfall, freshwater scarcity, and degradation of pastures, livestock rearing is no longer viable in the area, leading to increasing rural-to-urban migration.

== Fishing ==
Fishing remains the cornerstone of the local economy. The lagoon and nearby waters yield high-quality marine species including fish such as Mushk, Paplets, and Sunheri, as well as shrimp species like Tiger, Jairo, and Kiddi. The catch from Kalmat is transported to Karachi and exported internationally, contributing significantly to local income. Fishermen often undertake extended trips to larger fishing hubs such as Pasni and Gwadar. Threats to this livelihood loom large, particularly due to environmental degradation and potential land-use changes.

== Naval Base ==
Kalmat Hor has come under national attention due to proposed plans by the Pakistan Navy to establish the Kalmat Naval Base. While official confirmation remains pending, such a development raises concerns among local communities, environmentalists, and India. It is feared that the naval presence could displace local fishermen and disrupt traditional livelihoods.

== Sources ==
- "Study on Knowledge, Attitudes & Practises of Fisherfolk Communities about Fisheries and Mangrove Resources. Kalmat Khor (Final Report)" (PDF), wwf.org.pk, World Wide Fund for Nature, WWF Pakistan, 2005
