= Hingol River =

Pakistani river

Hingol River Hungol River
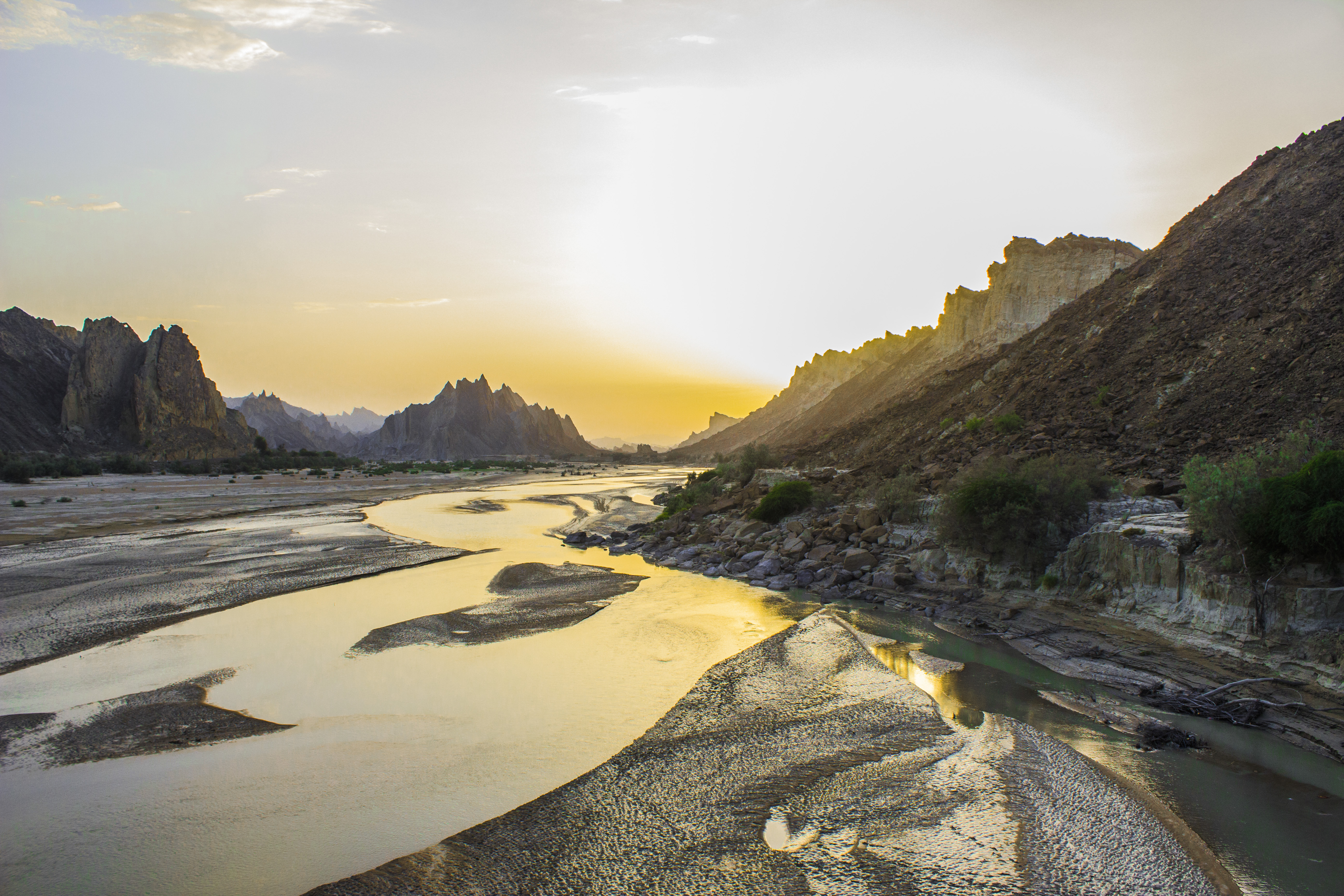
- Native name: Balochi: ہنگول ندی

Location
- Country: Pakistan
- Province: Balochistan
- Districts: Awaran District, Gwadar District, Lasbela District

Physical characteristics
- Mouth
  - coordinates: 25°22′50″N 65°30′55″E
  - elevation: 0 m (0 ft)
- Length: 560 km (350 mi)
- Basin size: 34,557.6 km^{2} (13,342.8 sq mi)
- Discharge
  - location: Near mouth
  - average: (Period: 1971–2000)71.9 m^{3}/s (2,540 cu ft/s)

Basin features
- Progression: Arabian Sea
- River system: Hingol River

Hingol River, also known as Hungol River (Urdu: دریائے ہنگول, Balochi: ہنگول ندی, Lasi: هنگول نالو, pronounced [hɪŋˈɡoːl naːˈloː]) is a river located in the Makran region of southwestern Pakistan, in Balochistan province. Flowing 560 km (350 mi), it is the longest river in Balochistan, traversing the districts of Gwadar, Lasbela (Liari Tehsil), and Awaran. The river courses through the Hingol National Park, Pakistan's largest protected area, known for its arid mountain landscapes, rich biodiversity, and striking geological formations.

== Etymology ==
The name "Hingol" is believed to originate from the Sanskrit word "Hingula" (हिङ्गुला), meaning cinnabar, a red mineral (mercuric sulfide), possibly alluding to the reddish hues found in the sediment and rock formations along the river's course.

== Geography ==
Originating in the mountains of Awaran, the Hingol River winds through steep gorges and canyons within the Makran Coastal Range, flowing southward into the Arabian Sea near the estuary of the Hingol Delta. Its perennial flow distinguishes it from most rivers in Balochistan, which are seasonal and dependent on rainfall. The river supports both ecological and human communities in this otherwise arid region.

== Ecology ==
The river basin is home to a variety of flora and fauna, many of which are endemic or threatened. The river's flow sustains wetlands, riparian vegetation, and supports fish populations, making it critical for biodiversity. According to WWF–Pakistan, the Hingol is one of Balochistan's four rivers, including the Kech, Hub and Basol rivers, that hosts a healthy crocodile population.

== Cultural Significance ==
The Hingol River holds deep spiritual importance to many locals, particularly at the Hinglaj Mata Temple (also known as Nani Mandir), located in a cave along the river's bank. This temple is seen as one of the holiest Hindu pilgrimage sites in Pakistan, drawing thousands of pilgrims—mostly from Sindh and Balochistan each year. The annual gathering at Hinglaj is a display of inter-communal harmony, with local Baloch Muslims traditionally protecting the pilgrimage as part of the area's cultural heritage.

The pilgrims customarily perform a ritual ablution in the river, an act symbolically likened to bathing in the sacred waters of the Ganges, before proceeding onward to the temple.

== Conservation and Challenges ==
Although part of a national park, the Hingol River and its surrounding environment face growing environmental threats such as illegal logging, unregulated tourism, and potential impacts from infrastructure development, including roads and energy projects. Conservation efforts by provincial authorities and NGOs should promote sustainable ecotourism, enforce protection laws, and maintain the ecological balance of the river basin.

== See also ==
- List of rivers of Pakistan
- Makran
- Geography of Balochistan, Pakistan
