= Jebel e Ghurab =

Mud volcano in Balochistan, Pakistan

Coordinates: 25.748384°N 66.133688°E

Jebel e Ghurab is a mud volcano located in Balochistan, Pakistan.

== See also ==
- List of volcanoes in Pakistan
