= Hinglaj Mata Temple =

Hindu temple in Balochistan, Pakistan

Hinglaj Mata Temple हिंगलाज माता मंदिर
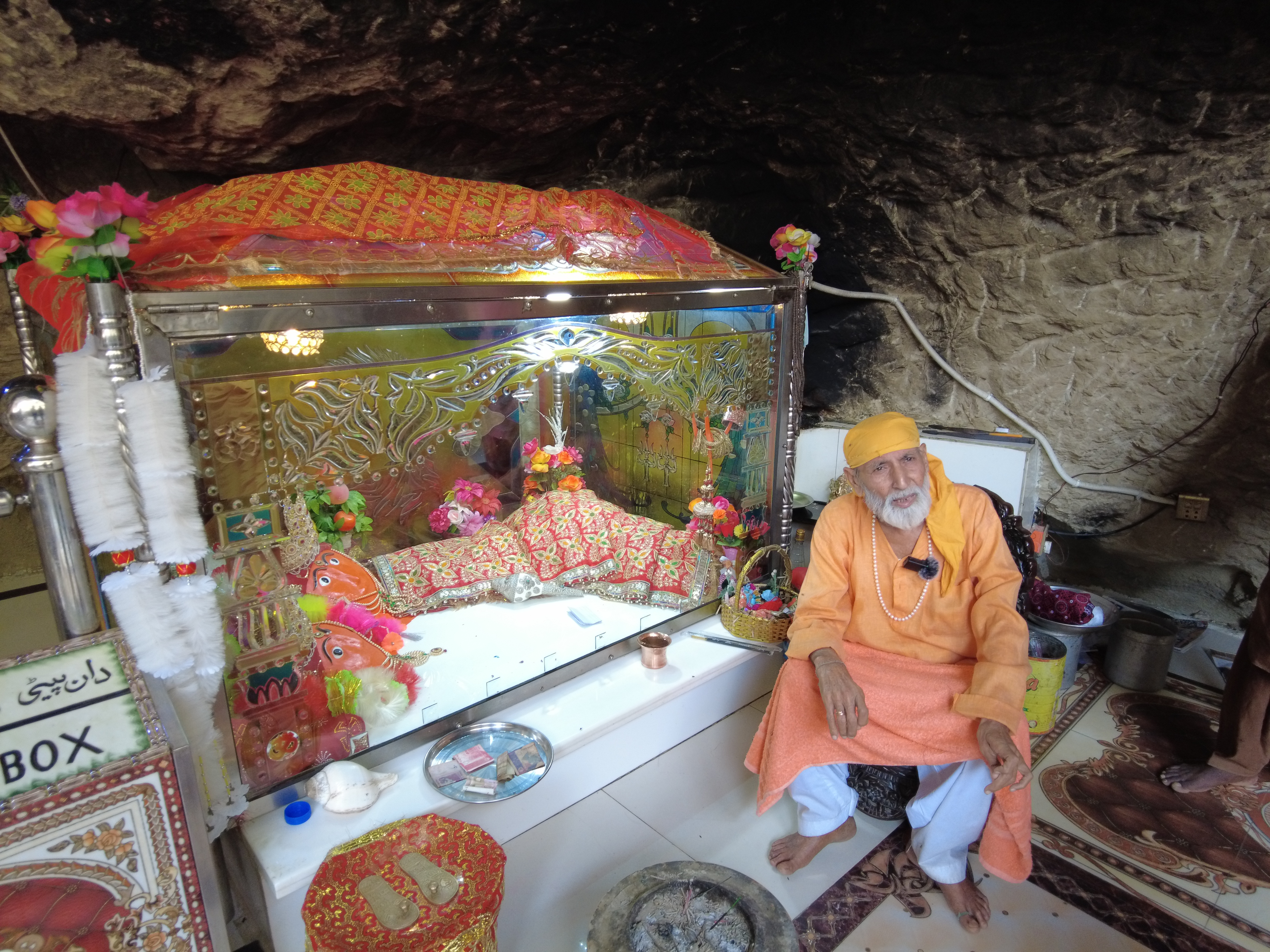
- Sanctum of Hinglaj Mata Mandir

- Location within Balochistan. Hinglaj Mata Temple (Pakistan) Hinglaj Mata Temple (Asia)

Religion
- Affiliation: Hinduism
- District: Lasbela District
- Deity: Hinglaj Mata (an aspect of goddess Durga)
- Festivals: Four Day Theerth Yatra in April, Navaratri

Location
- Location: Hingol National Park, Hinglaj
- State: Balochistan
- Country: Pakistan
- Coordinates: 25.0°30′50″N 65.0°30′55″E

Website
- hinglajmata.org

Hinglaj Mata (Urdu: ہنگلاج ماتا; Balochi: هنگلاج ماتا; Sindhi: هنگلاج ماتا ,हिग्लाज़ माता मंदिर), also known as Hinglaj Devi, Hingula Devi and Nani Mandir, is a Hindu temple in Hinglaj, a town on the Makran coast in the Lasbela district of Balochistan, Pakistan. It lies in the middle of the Hingol National Park. It is one of the 51 Shakta pithas in Shaktism denomination of Hinduism. It is one of the two Shakta pithas in Pakistan, the other one being Sharada Peeth in the Neelum Valley of Pakistan-Administered Jammu and Kashmir (AJK). It is a form of Durga or Devi in a mountain cavern on the banks of the Hingol River. Over the last three decades the place has gained increasing popularity and become a unifying point of reference for Pakistan's many Hindu communities. Hinglaj Yatra, by 300,000 people during the spring, is the largest Hindu pilgrimage in Pakistan.

== Location ==
The cave temple of Hinglaj Mata is in a narrow gorge in the remote, hilly area of Lyari Tehsil in Balochistan. It is 250 kilometres (160 mi) to the northwest, 19 kilometres (12 mi) inland from the Arabian Sea and 130 kilometres (80 mi) to the west of the mouth of the Indus. It is at the end of a range of Kirthar Mountains, in the Makran desert stretch, on the west bank of Hingol River. The area is under the Hingol National Park.

Other places of worship in and around Hinglaj are Ganesh Deva, Mata Kali, Gurugorakh Nath Dooni, Braham Kudh, Tir Kundh, Gurunanak Kharao, Ramjarokha Bethak, Aneel Kundh On Chorasi Mountain, Chandra Goop, Khaririver and Aghore Pooja.

== Significance ==
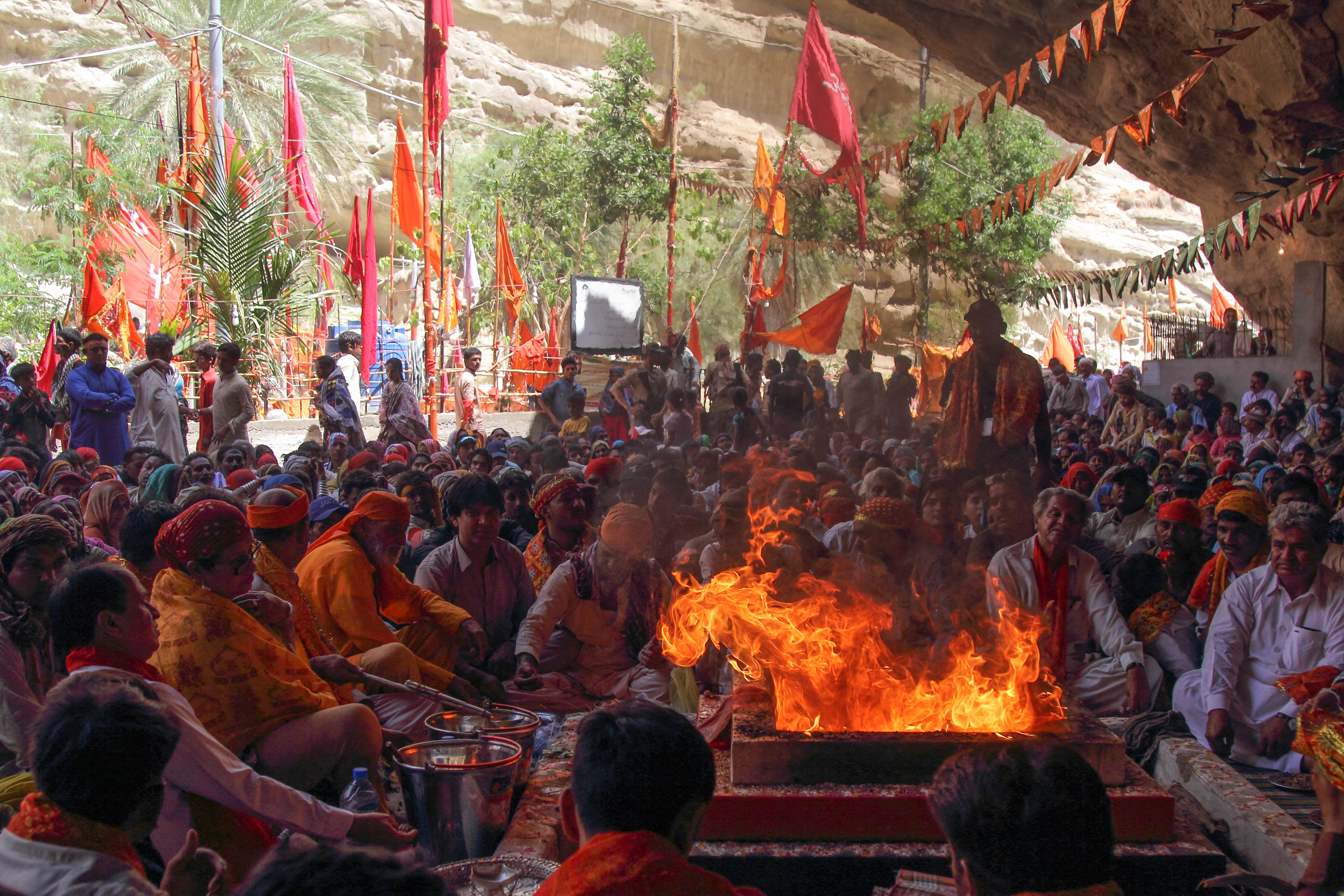
The temple's annual yatra pilgrimage

Hinglaj Mata is a major place of worship in the region. Other temples dedicated to the goddess exist in neighbouring Indian states Gujarat, Rajasthan and Maharastra, including a 13th century temple in Hinglajgarh. The shrine is known as Hingula, Hingalaja, Hinglaja, and Hingulata, Kottari or Kotavi in Hindu scriptures, particularly in Sanskrit.

Shiva is also worshiped at each Shakta pitha in the form of Bhairava, the male counterpart or guardian of the presiding goddess of the Pitha. A small part of the upper head of Sati is believed to have fallen at Hinglaj.

=== In scriptures ===
The Kularnava Tantra mentions 18 Pithas and mentions Hingula as the third one. In the Kubjika Tantra, Hingula is listed among the 42 Shakta or Siddha Pithas in which Hinglaj is at the fifth place. The Pithanirnaya or Mahapithanirupana section from the Tantrachudamani originally listed 43 names, but names were added over time making it 51 Pithas. It details the Pitha-devata or Devi (name of goddess at the Pitha), the Kshastradishas (Bhairava) and the anga-pratyanga (limbs including ornaments of Sati). Hingula or Hingulata is the first in list, with the anga-pratyanga being Brahmarandhra (a suture in the crown of the head). The Devi is known by several names such as Kottari, Kottavi, Kottarisha, and the Bhairava is Bhimalochana. In the Shivasharitha, Hingula is again the first in a list of 55 Pithas. Brahmarandhra is the anga-pratyanga, the goddess is called Kottari and the Bhairava is Bhimalochana (located in Koteshwar).

The 16th century Bengali work Chandimangal, Mukundaram lists nine Pithas in the Daksha-yajna-bhanga section. Hinglaja is the last Pitha described to be the place where Sati's forehead fell.

Another legend is that Devi killed Hingol as he tormented the people. She followed Hingol to the cave, which is currently the Hinglaj Mata shrine. Before he was killed, Hingol requested the goddess to name the place after him, which she granted.

=== Belief of Brahmakshatriyas ===
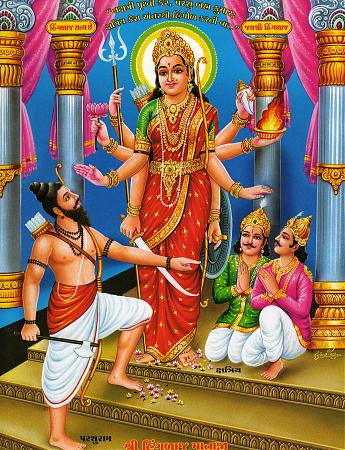
Picture of Hinglaj Mata protecting Brahmakshatriyas from Parashurama

A caste group known as the Brahmakshatriyas venerate Hinglaj Mata as their family deity. They believe that when the god Parashurama was persecuting kshatriyas (the warrior caste), some Brahmins (priest caste) provided protection to 12 kshatriyas and disguised them as Brahmins, and they were protected by Hinglaj Mata. Another variation of the tale is that the sage Dadhichi provided protection to Ratnasena, a king ruling in Sind, in his ashram (hermitage). However, Parashurama killed him when he ventured out. His sons remained in the ashram. When Parashurama visited the ashram, they were disguised as Brahmins. One of them, Jayasena, returned to Sind to rule the kingdom, armed with a protective mantra of Hinglaj Mata, given by Dadhici. Hinglaj Mata protected Jayasena and ordered Parshurama to end his killing spree.

=== Belief as Kuldevi ===
As per the popular folklore of Treta Yuga, a virtuous Haihaya king of Mahishmati of Malwa region, Sahasrabahu Arjuna or Sahasrarjun, more widely known as Kartavirya Arjuna drunk with power and sense of invincibility ends up killing the great Brahman sage Jamadagni over a sacred cow Kamadhenu. Furious at this heinous crime, son of Jamadagni, Lord Parashurama vows to vanquish the power-drunk Kshatriya clan from Earth. Wielding his divine axe, he eliminates Sahasrarjun and later on he rages on earth 21 times, each time decimating unvirtuous and unworthy kings wherever he went.

Terrified with the prospect of death at Lord Parashuram, the progeny of Sahasrarjun seek Janaka Maharaj, one of the most learned king of Videha who advises them to seek Hinglaji Mata's blessing. The clan devotedly pray to Devi at Higloj who is overcome with compassion and assures shelter in her place. Over time, when Lord Parasuraman visits this place, he was pleasantly surprised to see Kshatriya clan involved in many Brahminical activities having shed their arms. Hinglaj Mata intervenes on their behalf, and since then the clan disowned arms. Lord Parasuraman not only taught them scriptures and Vedas, but also weaving for a living. The clan with a sense of relief then branches out and spread across Sindh, Punjab, Rajasthan, Madhya Pradesh, Telangana, Maharashtra, Andhra Pradesh, and Karnataka. And where ever they went they continued worshiping Hinglaj Devi. Charan also known as Gadhvi, Khatris, Bhavasars, Barot (caste), and Shimpis of Somavaunsha Sahasrarjun Kshatriya trace their origin to this clan. Some of those who remained in Sindh province later on converted to Islam. Of note, even today they are one of the oldest non-Brahmin clans who had knowledge of Vedas. To this day many work as weavers and tailors.

=== Veneration of Hinglaj Mata by Muslims ===
The local Muslims, particularly the Zikri Muslims also hold Hinglaj Mata in reverence and provide security to the shrine. They call the temple the "Nani Mandir" (lit. "maternal grandmother's temple"). Local Muslim tribes along with Hindus make pilgrimage to the Hinglaj Mata shrine and some call the pilgrimage as the "Nani Ki Haj".

Sufi Muslims also revere Hinglaj Mata. The Sufi saint Shah Abdul Latif Bhittai had visited the Hinglaj Mata temple and it is mentioned in his poetry. The Sur Ramkali was composed by Shah Abdul Latif Bhitai in reverence to the Hinglaj Mata and the visiting jogis. There is a legend that the Shah Abdul Latin Bhittai took on the arduous journey to visit the Hinglaj Mata Mandir to pay tribute to the Hinglaj Mata and offered milk to the Hinglaj Mata. It is also believed that after he offered the milk, the Hinglaj Mata appeared in front of him.

== Annual pilgrimage (Hinglaj Yatra or Theerth Yatra) ==
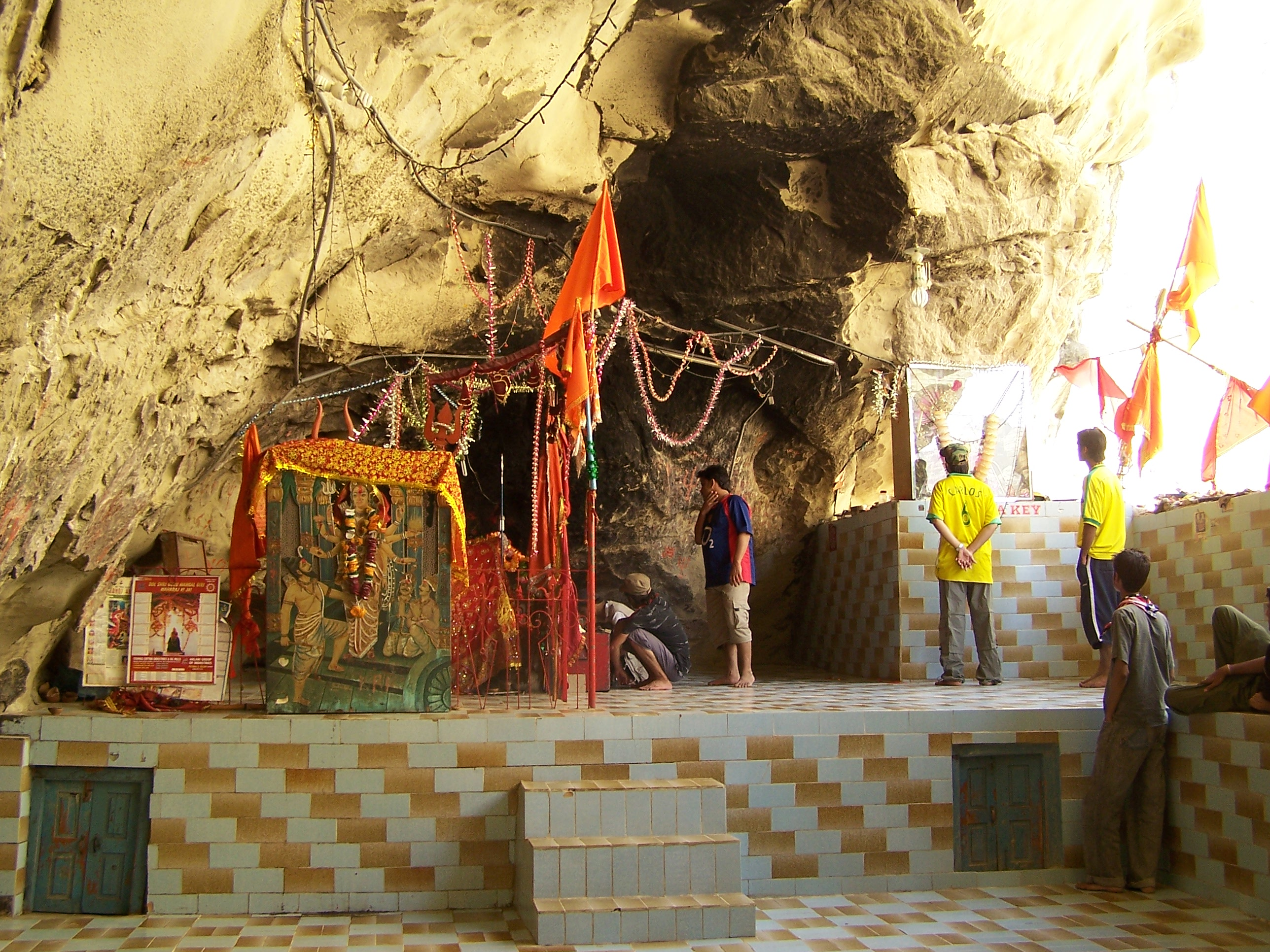
Hinglaj Mata Mandir Cave entrance

Once pilgrims arrive in Hinglaj they complete a series of rituals, like climbing the Chandragup and Khandewari mud volcanoes. Devotees throw coconuts into the craters in the Chandragup mud volcano to make wishes and thank the gods for answering their prayers. Some scatter rose petals, others paint their bodies and faces with clay. Pilgrims then take a ritual bath in the sacred Hingol River before finally approaching the shrine marking the goddess's resting place. The annual four-day pilgrimage to the Hinglaj Mata Temple is in April. The major ceremony in the pilgrimage occurs on the third day, when the priests of the shrine recite mantras to invoke the gods to accept the offerings brought by the pilgrims, and bless them. Offerings made by the pilgrims to the deity primarily consist of three coconuts. While some remain in Hinglaj for all four days, others make a short day trip.

Pilgrimage to the site is traditionally begun from the Nanad Panthi Akhada in Karachi. The pilgrim groups are headed by a holy staff bearer called the chaadiar, authorized by the Akhada (a Hindu organization of sadhus). The sadhus (holy-men) belonging to this group are a very cohesive group of Hata yogis with ancestral genealogy of their own; and they also observe secret rites. Historically few could make the taxing journey to Hinglaj—a grueling trek across more than 160 miles of isolated desert to the temple. But in recent years, new infrastructure has allowed an unprecedented number of pilgrims to enter the site, altering centuries-old rituals.

Pilgrims from all over Pakistan and even India visit the temple, holding traditional red banners and wearing red-gold decorative head-scarves, which are associated with sanctuaries of Hindu goddesses, in this case Hinglaj Mata. What was once a journey of more than 150 kilometres (93 mi) by foot through the desert from the nearest road, is now made easy by the Makran Coastal Highway connecting Karachi with Gwadar. Hinglaj is 328 km and nearly 4 hours drive from Karachi on the Makran Coastal Highway. Consequently, the number of pilgrims visiting the shrine has substantially increased over the years; the last reported figure was 300,000 in 2026. While most pilgrims come by buses or private cars, a few cycle their way to the shrine, as it is believed that more the austerities, the more is the grace of the deity.

Hindus from Thar region form the largest contingent of pilgrims to Hinglaj Mata Temple. They include merchants, government servants, but the majority are the lower-class Hindus, serving as bonded labourers and farm workers. The costumes of these folks from rural Pakistan are most colourful. Their women dress in heavily embroidered clothes with bangles adorning their wrists. For Thari children employed as bonded labour, this is a one-time fun time. The pilgrims include middle-class Hindus, especially from nearby Karachi, which is a stop on the pilgrimage route to Hinglaj.

The pilgrimage serves as meeting point for places and doing community activity like gathering funds for construction of a Hindu temple. Hundreds of volunteers help in the organization. Diesel generators are installed. Vast community kitchens are set up to cook food prepared with tonnes of food stuff such as wheat floor, rice, lentils, and vegetables supplied by local people to feed the pilgrims. Three meals are prepared. Temporary bathroom facilities and camps are installed.

Historically few could make the taxing journey to Hinglaj—a grueling trek across more than 160 miles of isolated desert to the site of Sati's fallen head. But in recent years, new infrastructure has allowed an unprecedented number of pilgrims to enter the site, altering centuries-old rituals.

== Baba Chandragup ==
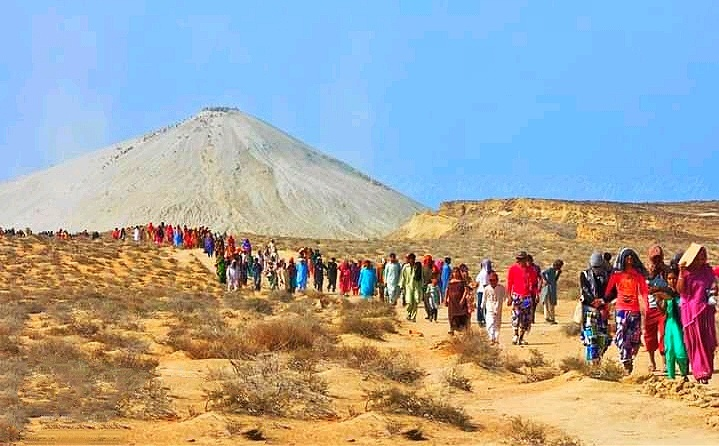
Devotees at Baba Chandragup volcano

The mud volcano Chandragup is considered holy by Hindus and is an important stop for pilgrims on their way to the shrine of Hinglaj Mata. Devotees throw coconuts into the craters to make wishes and thank the gods for answering their prayers.

The Chandragup mud volcano is worshipped as an embodiment of Lord Shiva and hence called Baba Chandragup. Many pilgrims believe that Hinglaj's temple may only be entered only after paying homage to Baba Chandrakup. Traditionally, the pilgrims stays awake all the night fasting and meditating on the sins they will confess at the rim of the crater next day and bake roti made out of ingredients contributed by all the yātrīs. On the next day they ascend the slope of Chandrakup. The roṭi is then served as an offering to Baba Chandrakup. Nowadays, coconuts, betel nut and dal are also offered. At the top of the Volcano, the pilgrims first have to introduce themselves with their full name and place of origin and then call out their sins in front of the group. According to the bubbling of the mud and the reaction of the wind, the chaṛīdār is able to tell if the pilgrim's sins are forgiven.

== Sacred Valley of Hinglaj ==
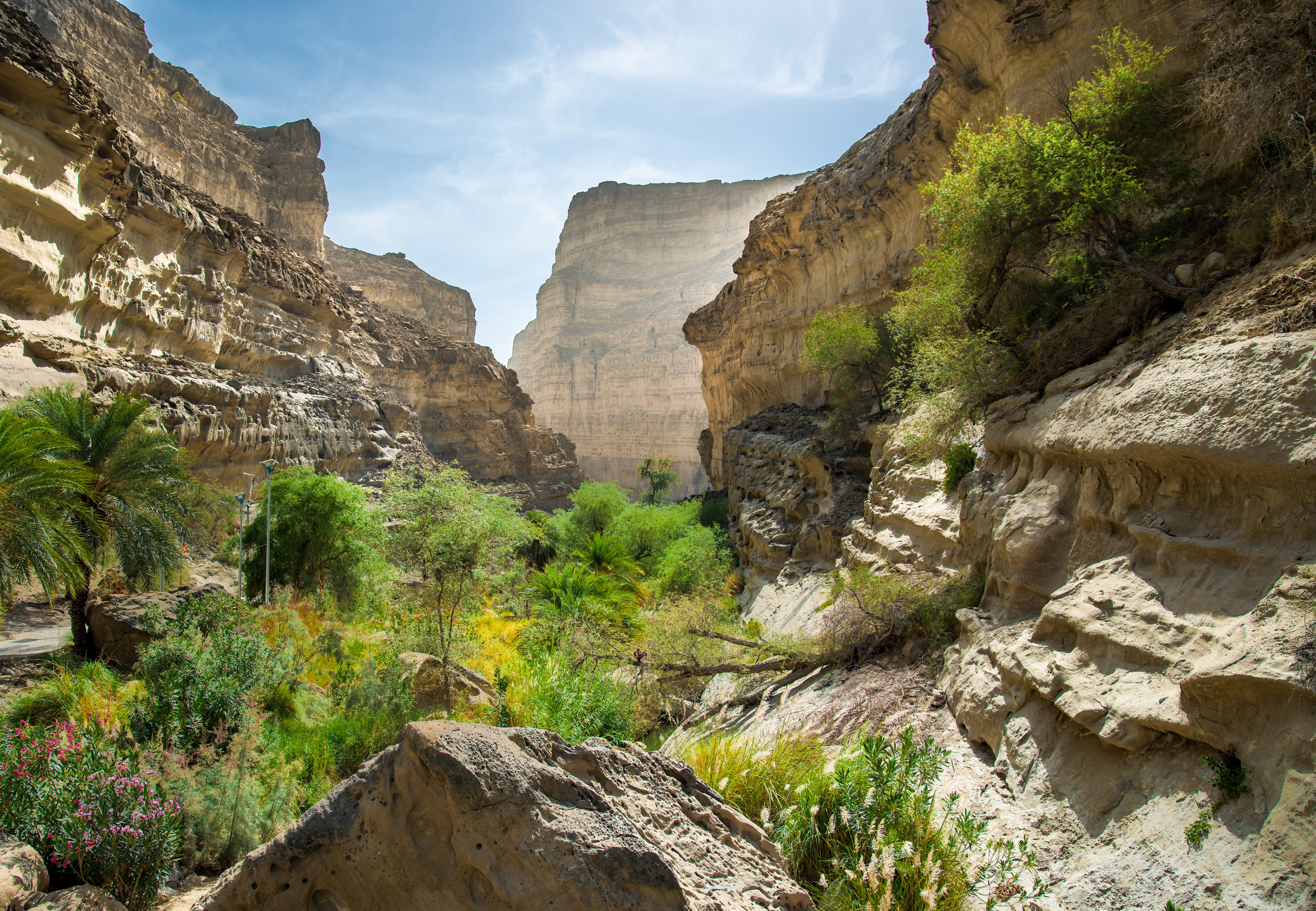
Canyons in Hinglaj

The Valley of Hinglaj is considered as Hinglaj Mata herself and hence is considered Sacred. This is the Swayambhu concept in Hinduism which implies a divine presence in natural manifestations such as particular landscapes or, on a smaller scale. Here the concept of svayaṃbhū not only relates to the major shrine but also can be linked to whole areas of the Hinglaj Valley, the area surrounding Hingol mud volcanoes, or even the whole desert is considered the home of the Devi.

The point at which the Hinglaj Valley begins is clearly marked by a wall built by the Hinglaj Sheva Mandali in 1996. However, traditional travelogues and of pilgrims coming to the shrine generally demonstrate that the Goddess's sacred geography more extended than this, the disappearance of the old pilgrimage paths led to the elimination of many stops en route. Due to the divinity of the Goddess's sacred geography commercial activities including shops and teastalls are not allowed to be set up in the valley.

== Rama's pilgrimage to Hinglaj ==
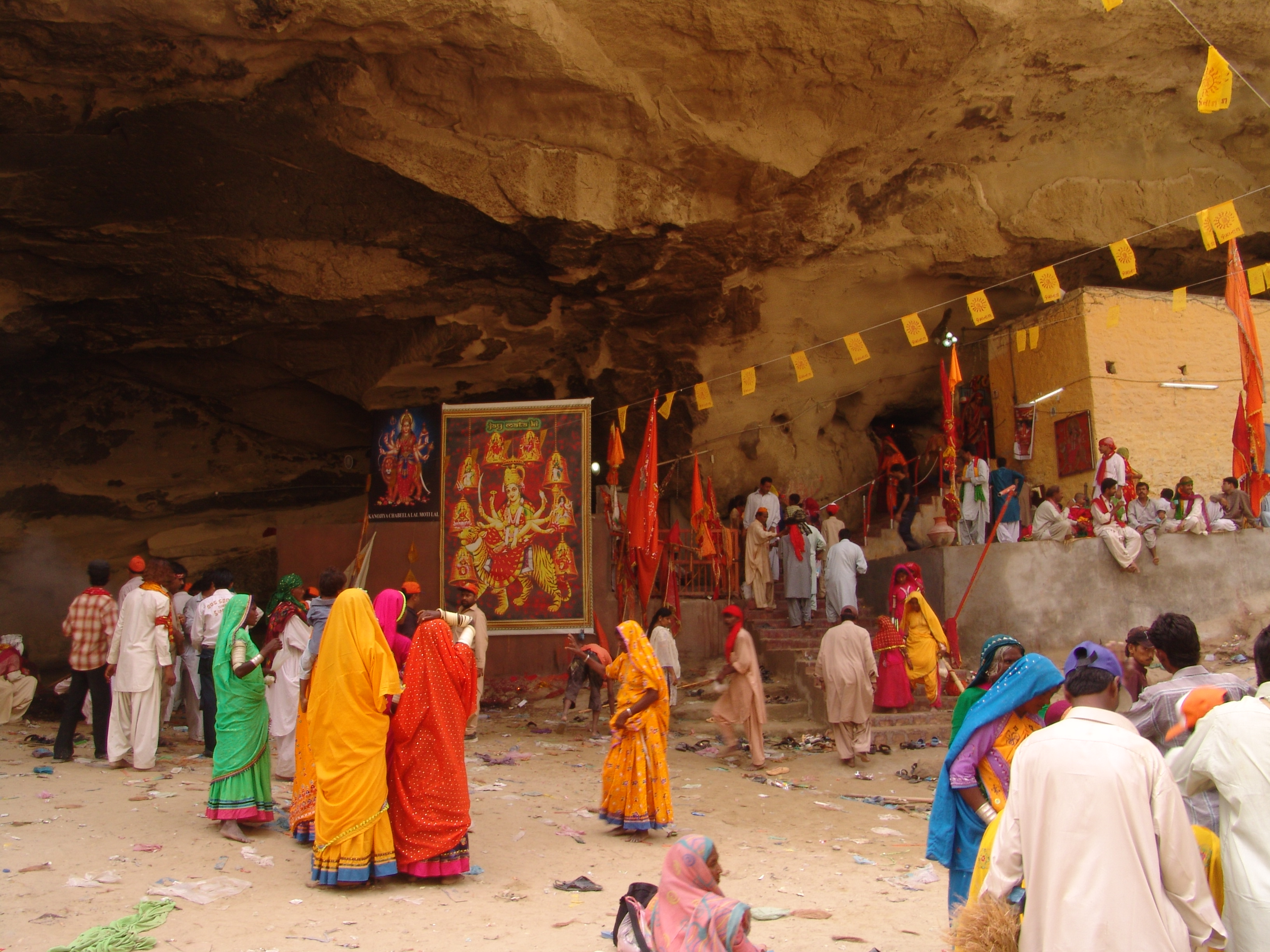
Hinglaj Mata Mandir Cave entrance

After killing Ravana, Rama returned from exile to ascend to the throne of Ayodhya. A sage Kumbodhar explained that to cleanse himself of this sin, Rama would have to make a pilgrimage to Hinglaj Mata, the only place that could purify him. Rama followed the advice and immediately left with his army for Hinglaj. Sita, Lakshmana, and Hanuman also accompanied him.

At the mountain pass, the goddess's army, which guarded the entry to her empire (Sacred Valley of Hinglaj) stopped them and a war broke out in which the goddess's army defeated Rama's army and told him that his army must retreat. When Rama sent a messenger to the goddess to inquire why she fought him, she responds that he must return to his first stop, which is now called Ram Bagh, and make the journey again as a simple pilgrim.

Therefore, Rama left his entourage, his army, and vehicles behind and set out to walk to the shrine accompanied only by his closest friends. Rama's men were devastated at not being allowed to accompany their lord to the goddess's abode. The Devi thus promised them that their descendants will, at some point in time, all come back to do the pilgrimage. For guidance through the harsh desert, Rama called on the pious Lalu Jasraj, a hermit who resided nearby at some hot springs, to be their charidar for the yatra. Only now did the goddess allow the group to cross the pass.

After only a few kilometers, Sita became thirsty in the burning desert heat and requested that Hanuman and Lakshmana bring her water. Hanuman tried to extract water from the soil by stomping his foot violently on the ground, but this produces only a dry riverbed. With the same aim, Lakshmana shot an arrow into the mountain range, but only succeeded in detaching one of the hills. In agony, Sita placed her palm down on the soil and thereby made five wells appear, from which the group drank. These five wells are known as Seeta Koowas. The river followed by a series of five wells reportedly produced either by the power of Sita or by Hinglaj herself. But these landmarks are not seen today.

After a physically challenging journey, Rama reached the shrine of the goddess, and the Devi granted him purification of his sin. To mark his completed yātrā, he carved the symbols of the Sun and Moon on the mountain opposite the temple which can be seen even today.

Hinglaj pilgrims before going to Hinglaj go to Khari Nadi, where people take a bath in the ocean and worship Rama.

== Hinglaj Seva Mandali ==
The Hinglaj Sheva Mandali is the temple committee established to promote an annual pilgrimage to the shrine. It was created on 5 January 1986, and continues to be the main organization serving the Hinglaj Mata temple and its pilgrims.

== Controversy ==
=== Committee chairman kidnapping ===
The chairman of the temple committee was kidnapped two days before the annual Hinglaj Yatra in 2012 by unknown people. He was kept in captivity for 73 days and later released. The Pakistan Hindu Council strongly criticised that his kidnapping was a conspiracy against the Hindus residing in Pakistan.

=== Dam construction ===
In 2008, Water and Power Development Authority of Pakistan proposed a plan to build a dam on the Hingol River close to the shrine. The dam would have flooded the access roads to the temple and endangered the locality and its associated festivals. Following protest from the Hindu community, the dam proposal was abandoned by the Balochistan Assembly.

After this, the WAPDA initially suggested relocating three holy places to a higher elevation and guaranteed the construction of a new access road. This proposition was rejected by the Hinglaj Sheva Mandali, which argued that these sites were not like common temples and could not simply be relocated. In 2008, the lawmakers on the Balochistan Assembly reacted to the concerns and protests of the Hindu community and asked the federal government to stop the project. In 2009, after a year of suspension, WAPDA chose to continue with the controversial Hingol Dam construction plans but decided to shift the site of the dam a few kilometers north in order to protect the temple. This resolution was in keeping with a consensus between WAPDA, the Balochistan Assembly, and the Hindu community.

== Culture ==
=== Media and films ===
The Hinglaj temple is the main theme of the 1959 Bengali film Morutirth Hinglaj. It shows the arduous journey of a group of pilgrims through desert during Hinglaj pilgrimage. It was directed by Bikash Roy.

Hinglaj temple is backdrop for the 2013 Telugu Film Sahasam starring Gopichand and Taapsee Pannu and Shakti Kapoor. Its a treasure hunt movie with treasures tied to the Hinglaj Devi temple.

In 2014, a documentary named Goddess of Hinglaj-51 Shakti Peeth was produced by Rava Documentary Films. It covers the journey of pilgrims to the Hinglaj temple.

=== Books ===
'Hinglaj Shaktipeeth', a book by Onkar Singh Lakhawat who took the journey in 2006 along with Jaswant Singh, narrates his experiences & provides extensive details of the Hinglaj shrine. Lakhawat started writing after returning to India and the book was published in 2011.

== Theological origin ==
Some scholars have linked Hinglaj to the Bactrian goddess Nana, worshipped among the Parthian, Saka, and Kushan peoples.

To still the divine dance, Tandava, of the Hindu god Lord Shiva following the death of Dakshayani, the Hindu god Lord Vishnu scattered the remains of her embodiment over various places of the Indian subcontinent. A small part of the upper head of Sati is believed to have fallen at Hingula or Hinglaj and is thus considered the most important of the 51 Shakta pithas. At each of the Peeths, Bhairava (a manifestation of Shiva) accompanies the relics.

== See also ==
- Hinduism in Pakistan
- Hinduism in Balochistan

== Bibliography ==
- Raja, Prajna; Raja, Harish (2000). Prajna Yoga. Ocean Books (P) Ltd. p. 186. ISBN 81 87100-50-8.
- Kapoor, Subodh (2000). The Indian Encyclopaedia: Biographical, Historical, Religious, Administrative, Ethnological, Commercial and Scientific. Hinayana-India (Central India). Genesis Publishing Pvt Ltd. p. 2989. ISBN 9788177552676.
- Sircar, Dinesh Chandra (1998). The Śākta Pīṭhas Volume 8 of Religion and Ethics Series. Motilal Banarsidass Publ. pp. 18–19, 35, 39. ISBN 9788120808799.
- Dalal, Roshen (1998). Hinduism: An Alphabetical Guide. Penguin Books India. pp. 158–59. ISBN 9780143414216.
