= Hingol mud volcanoes =

Naturally occurring mud volcanoes in South-Western Pakistan

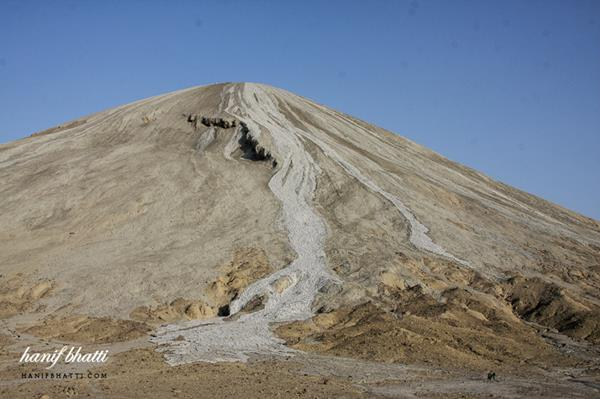
- Chandrakup volcano

- Location within Pakistan's Balochistan province.

Religion
- Affiliation: Hinduism
- District: Lasbela District
- Deity: Baba Chandrakup (Lord Shiva)
- Festival: Four Day Theerth Yatra in April(Hinglaj Yatra)

Location
- Location: Hinglaj
- State: Balochistan
- Country: Pakistan
- Interactive map of Hingol mud volcanoes
- Coordinates: 25°26′43″N 65°51′56″E

Architecture
- Elevation: 100 m (328 ft)

Website
- www.hinglajmata.com

The Hingol mud volcanoes (Balochi: ھنگول ئےِ خاک شان; Urdu: ہنگول خاک فشاں) are located in Lasbela District, Balochistan, Pakistan at a distance of around 100 km from Uthal, which is the headquarter of District Lasbela. The mud volcanoes are located in Hingol National Park, which is the largest national park in Pakistan. It contains about ten clusters of mud volcanoes, the most important of which are Chandragup and Khandewari volcanoes.

These are not located on the main road about a kilometer off the Makran Coastal Highway leading from Lasbela to Gwadar; the locals may provide guidance to the exact location. A landmark is an SSGC installation. The site is a complex of three major mud volcanoes and a number of smaller ones.

The three main mud volcanoes of the location, known as the Chandragup Complex, are Chandragup 1, 2 and 3. One of which is a 300-foot-high mud volcano. It is a sacred annual pilgrimage site for Hindus, along with the close by Hinglaj Mata Temple. Also known as Chandrakup, the volcano is considered holy by Hindus and is an important stop for pilgrims on their way to the Hinglaj Mata temple. Devotees throw coconuts into the craters to make wishes and thank the gods for answering their prayers.

== Chandragup ==
Chandragup is an active mud volcano located in Hingol National Park in the Pakistani Balochistan. Also known as Chandrakup, the volcano is considered holy by Hindus and is an important stop for pilgrims on their way to the Hinglaj Mata Temple.

The Chandragup mud volcano is worshipped as an embodiment of the Hindu god Shiva, and called Baba Chandragup. Pilgrims to the volcano believe that the Hinglaj Mata Temple may only be entered after paying homage to Baba Chandrakup. Traditionally, the pilgrim stays awake all night, fasting and meditating on the sins they will confess at the rim the following day. They bake roti made out of ingredients contributed by all the yātrīs (pilgrims). On the next day they ascend the slope of Chandrakup, and the roṭi is served as an offering to Baba Chandrakup. Nowadays, coconuts, betel nut and dal are also offered. At the volcano's peak, the pilgrims must introduce themselves with their full name and place of origin and then call out their sins in front of the group. According to the bubbling of the mud and the reaction of the wind, the chaṛīdār is able to tell if the pilgrim's sins are forgiven.

Devotees throw coconuts into the craters to make wishes and thank the gods for answering their prayers.

== Gallery ==
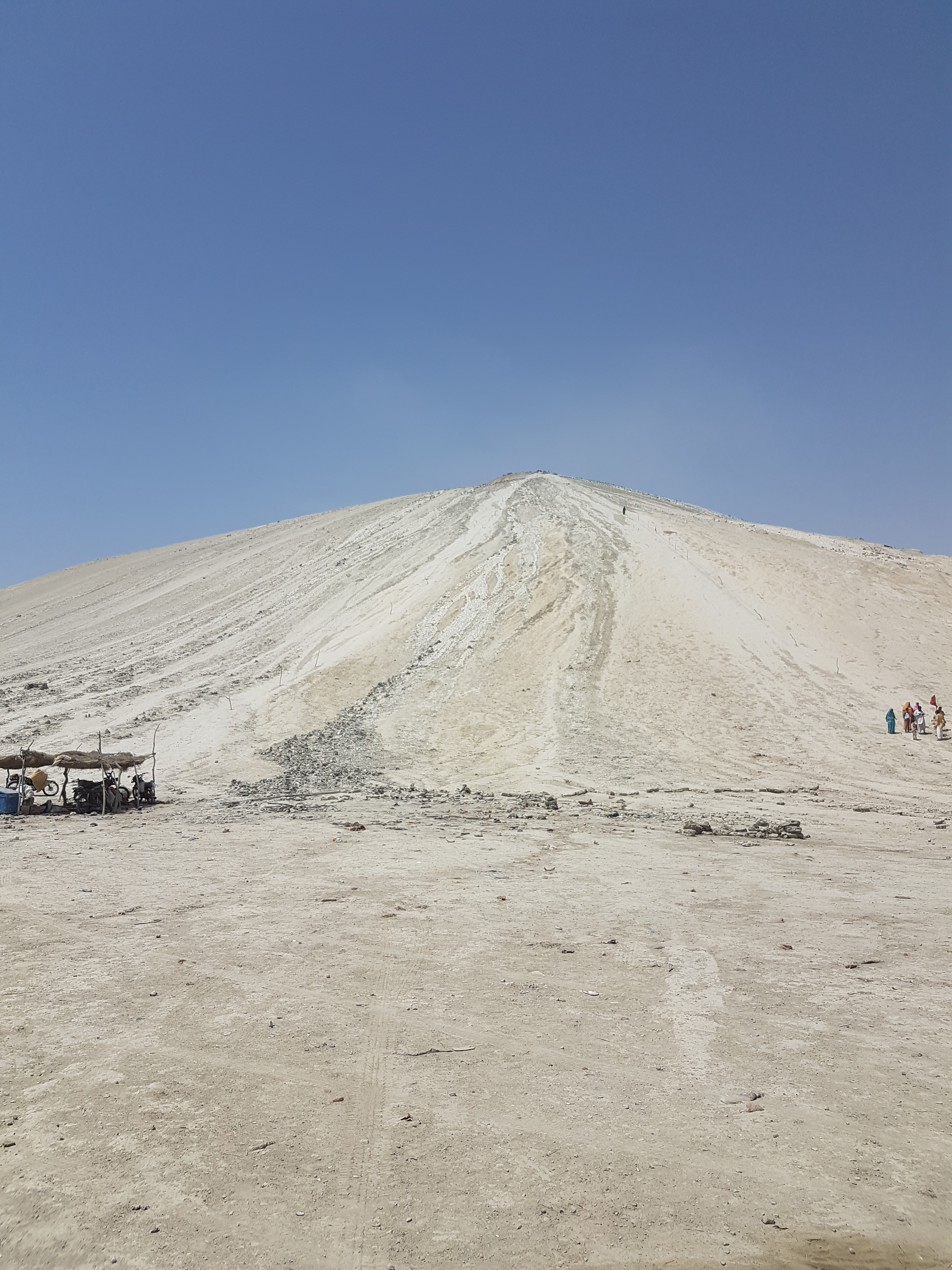
The view of Chandragup I mud volcano

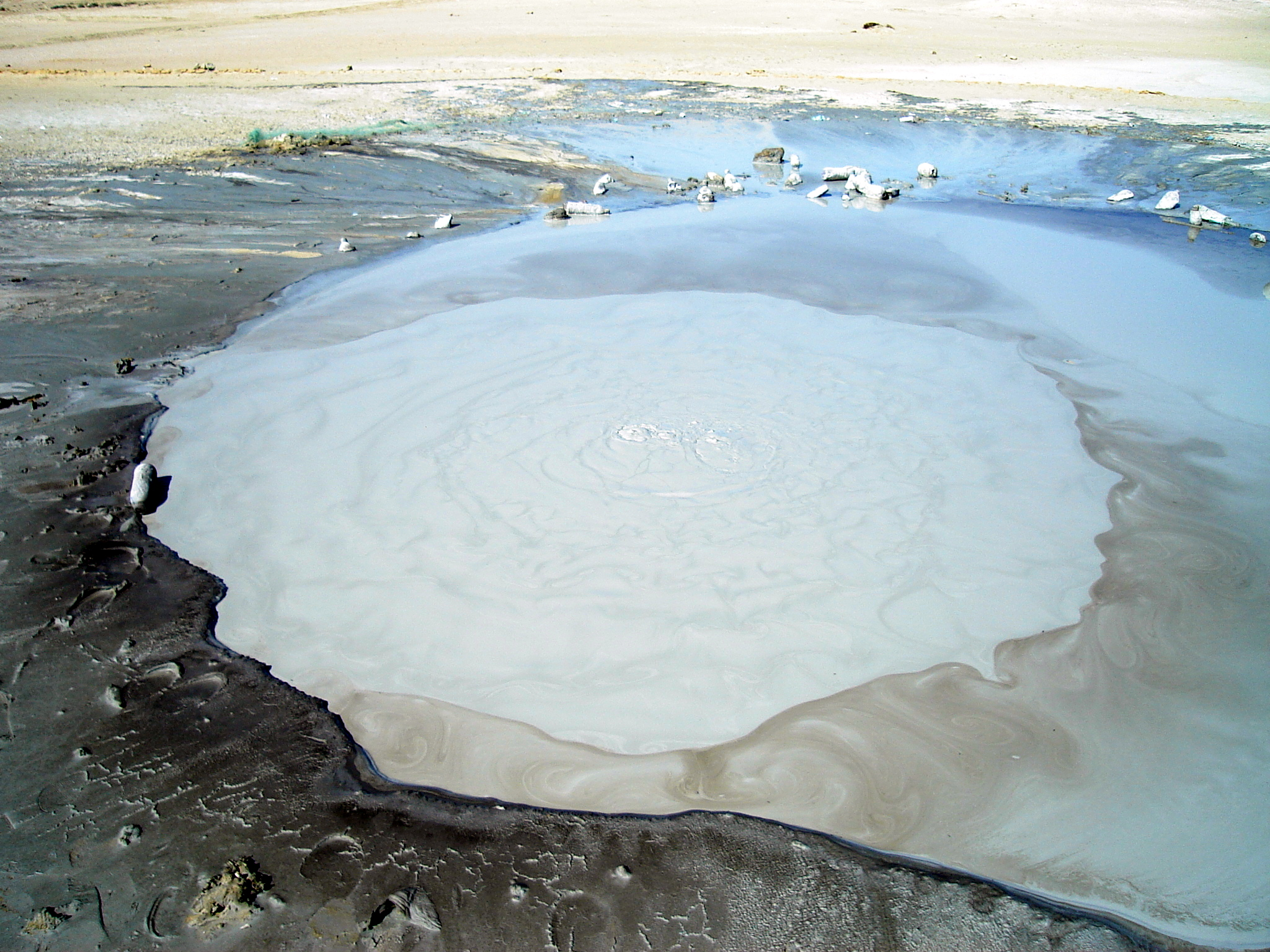
Mud Volcano 1

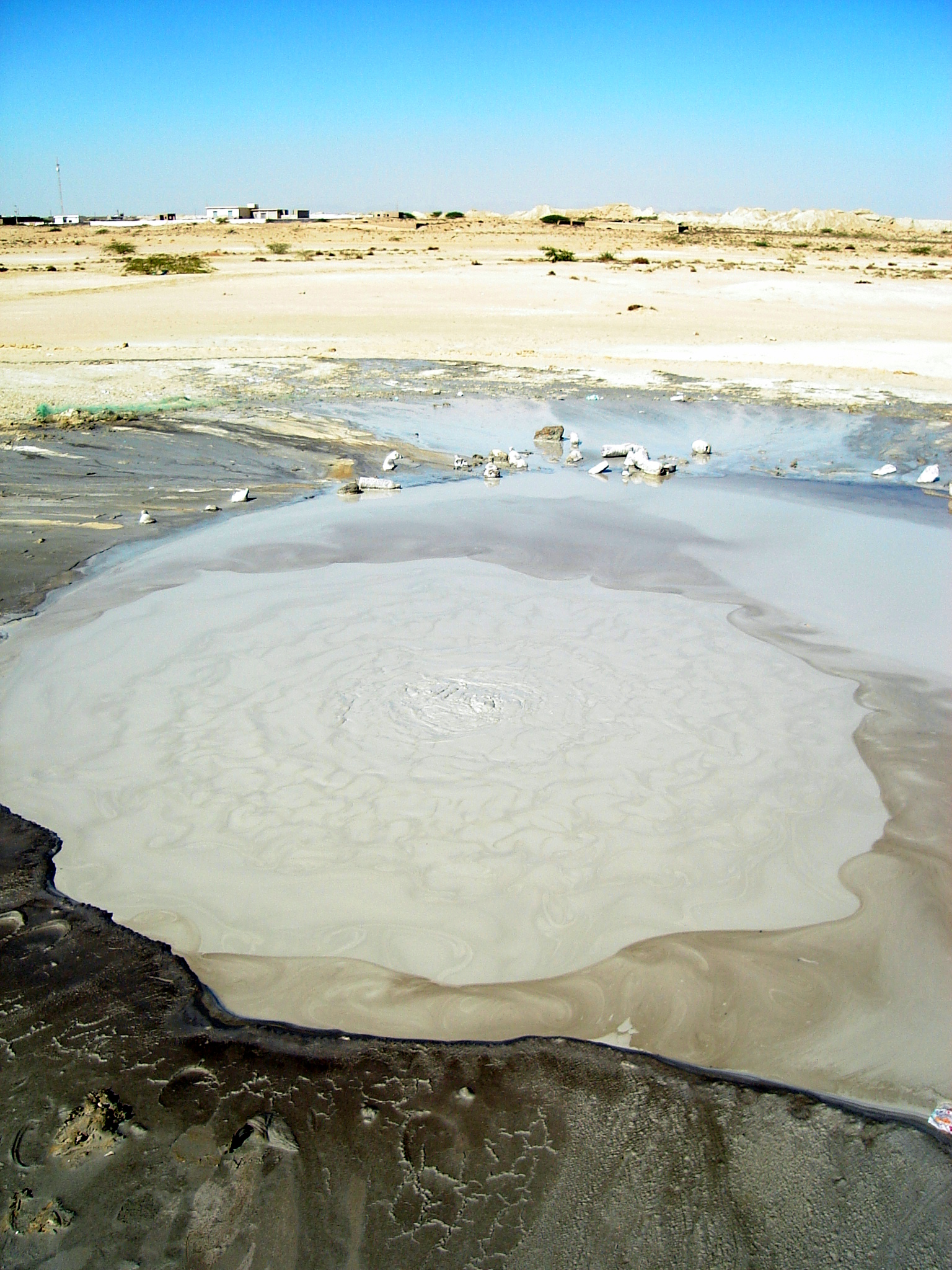
Mud Volcano 2

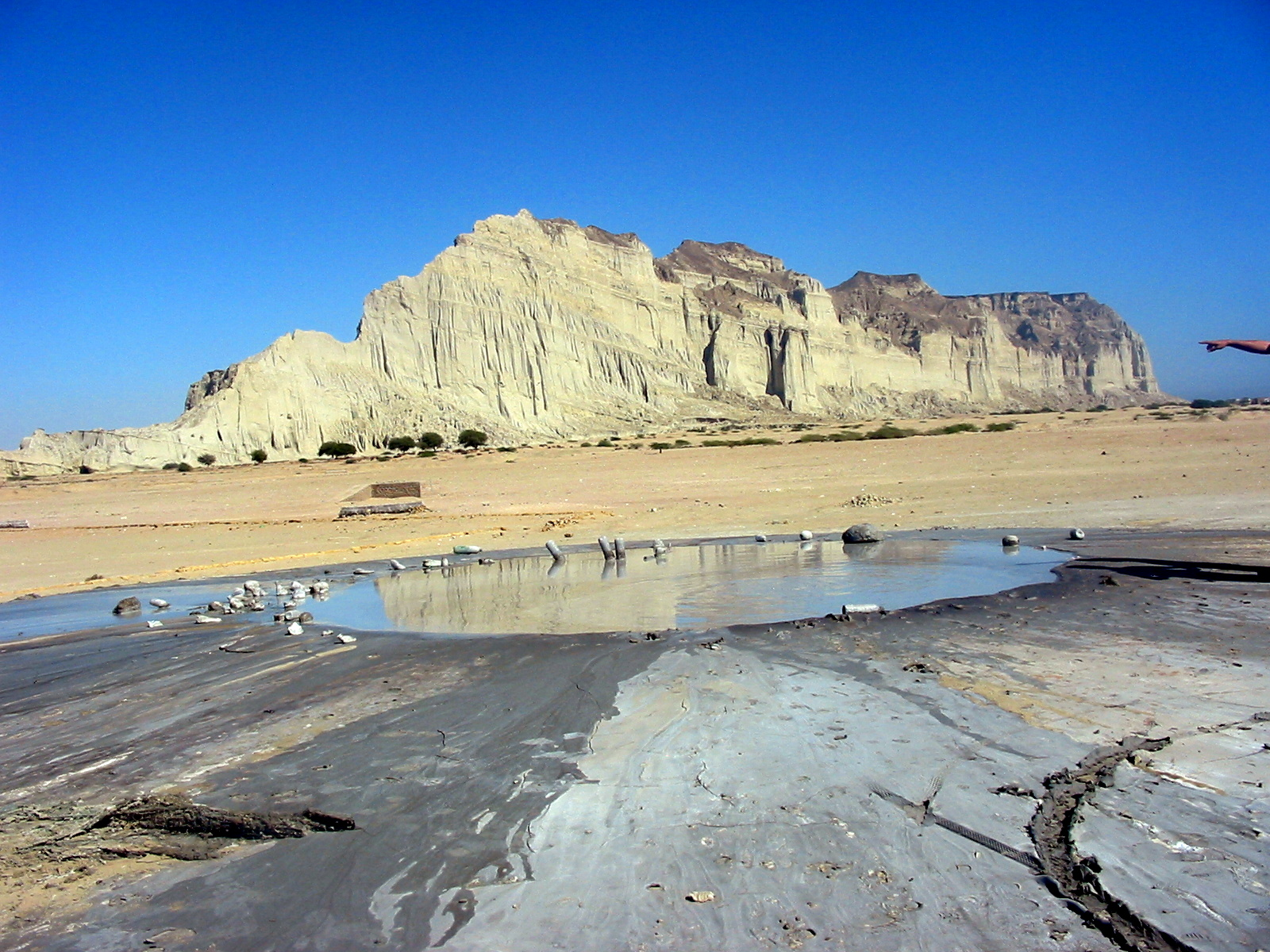
Mud Volcano 3

== See also ==
- List of volcanoes in Pakistan
- Hinduism in Balochistan
