= Tor Zawar =

Fissure vent volcano in western Pakistan

- Location within Balochistan, Pakistan Location within Pakistan

Highest point
- Elevation: 2,237 m (7,339 ft)
- Coordinates: 30°28′45″N 67°28′30″E

Geography
- Location: Pakistan

Geology
- Mountain type: Fissure vents
- Last eruption: January 2010

Tor Zawar is a disputed fissure vent volcano in western Pakistan and the only volcano in Pakistan with a recent report of eruption. Its first, and so far only, eruption occurred in January 2010.

== Morphology ==
Tor Zawar is a group of closely spaced fissure vents on a non-volcanic mountain in a tectonically active region between the Bibai and Gogai thrust faults (Global Volcanism Program), which is in the Ziarat region near the village of Wham.

== 2010 eruption ==
An eruption in the region on January 29, 2010 surprised volcanologists because no previous volcanic activity had ever taken place there. A local scientist reported that fissures opened, then emitted gases for a little while before the eruption began. The eruption produced a small spatter cone and a lava flow that only travelled 8.2 metres, and caused some minor damage. The lava is trachybasalt and basaltic andesite.

The eruption was preceded by a 60 km deep earthquake on 27 January. The calculated source depth of the lava is consistent with an origin at this depth in the asthenosphere.

== Disputed status ==
The origin of the lava is disputed. Kerr et al. (2010) interpreted the rocks as having formed from molten magma that had been created by partial melting in the mantle followed by eruption from a volcanic fissure vent. Kassi et al. (2012) disputed a mantle origin for these rocks, instead suggesting that the magma source was near-surface sedimentary rock that had been melted close to electricity pylons that had been struck by lightning, in a process similar to the formation of fulgurites (that are formed when lightning melts sand to produce natural glass).

Initially, the Smithsonian Institution's Global Volcanism Program included Tor Zawar in its database of volcanoes, citing the paper by Kerr et al. (2010). As of December 2017, however, the Global Volcanism Program excludes Tor Zawar from its volcano database and excludes the 2010 event from its eruption database.
