= Bhavsar =

Warrior caste

- Religions: Hindu, Jain
- Languages: Gujarati, Marathi, Hindi
- Populated states: Gujarat, Rajasthan, Maharashtra, Madhya Pradesh, Karnataka, Telangana, Andhra Pradesh

Bhavsar or "Bhavsara Kshatriya" is a Hindu caste. As time passed, the Bhavsar community was made up of community involved in Calico printing business. In Gujarat, Bhavsar are also known as Baniya (Vaniya) as the Bhavsar community has a long history of trading in textile, agriculture and other retail businesses. Subcategories in Bhavsar community are Hindu Bhavsar and Jain Bhavsar which represents diverse religions practices within Bhavsar community.

In the early 1850s, Bhavsars earned their riches through the clothing business, farmlands, havelis, and horses, but most Bhavsars are now pursuing modern-day occupations, including private sector or public sector jobs. After the Independence of India, Bhavsars did not get much in the way of government grants or opportunities. Bhavsars are being considered in open category. With limited alternatives (including Government grants, or benefits, after independence) Bhavsar youth mainly went towards higher education categories including engineering, medical, business degree and others. Surnames of Marathi-speaking Bhavsar people include Anchalkar, Gondkar, Achekar, and Vaijwade, among others.

== History ==
According to legend, the Bhavsar originated in the Saurashtra region, which is now in the state of Gujarat.

The Bhavsar community has negotiated with the Pakistani government to assure passage for regular pilgrimages to Hinglaj. Hinglaj Mata is their Community deity.

== Language ==
The Bhavsar community in Gujarat speak Gujarati, those in Maharashtra speak Marathi and those in Rajasthan speak a Rajasthani dialect, and the rest speak Hindi, apart from the local language but the Gujarati speaking and Marathi speaking Bhavsars were traditionally endogamous.
