= Neza e Sultan =

Volcano in Pakistan

Neza e Sultan (Urdu: نیزہ سلطان) (Neza means spear; Sultan means King; literally Sultan's Spear) is an extinct volcano located in Chagai District, Balochistan, Pakistan. Only the magma chamber, which has been compared to a spear, remains.

The staff-like formation is at a height of about 670 feet above the low watershed, "on the crest of which it rises as if from a pedestal". From this crest it rises about 250 feet higher, from "the floor of the ancient crater, which still forms a circular bowl". The rock formation displays longitudinal fissures created by weathering.

== See also ==
- List of volcanoes in Pakistan
