= Hingol National Park =

National park in Pakistan

- IUCN category II (national park)
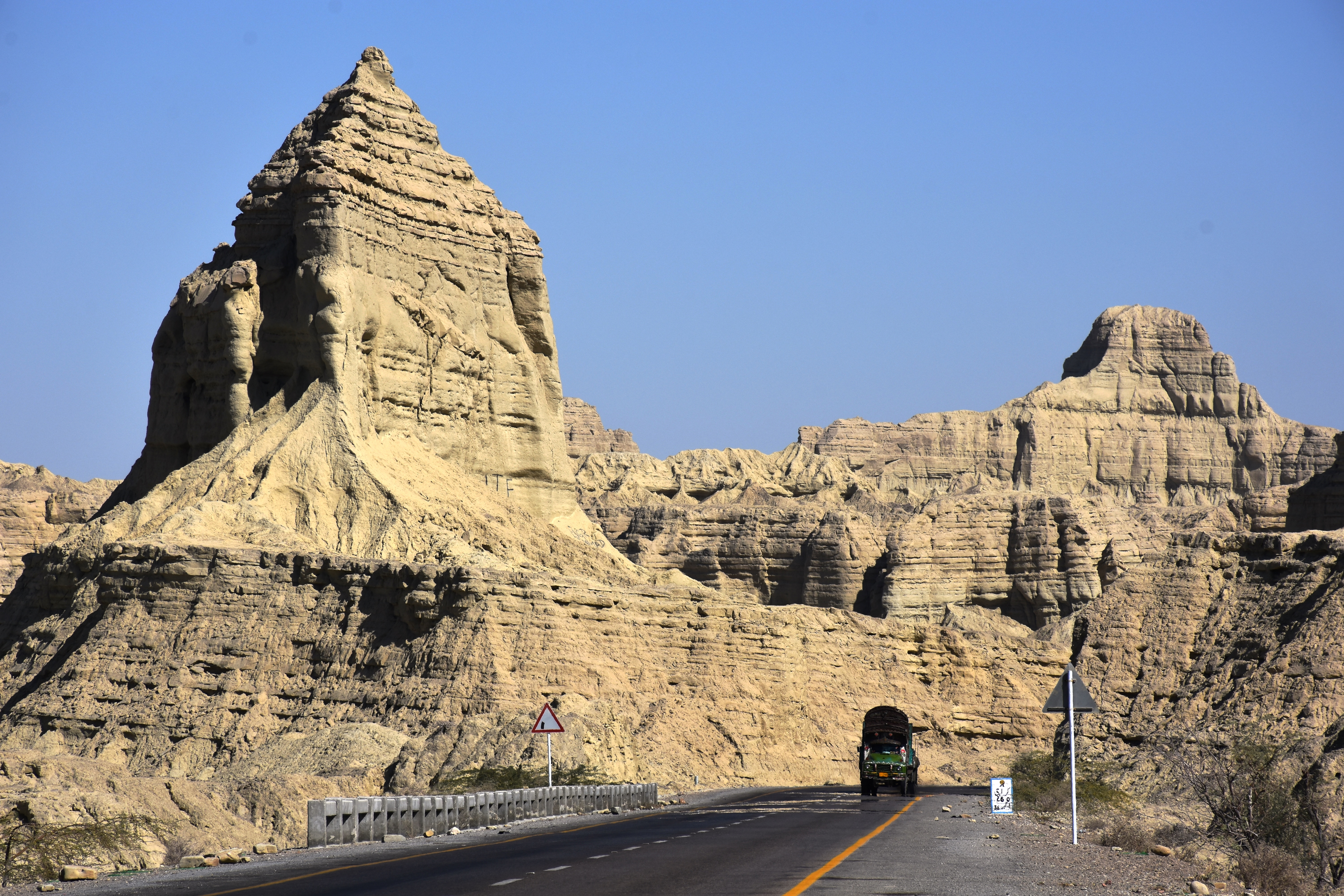
- The park's dramatic landscapes are connected to nearby Karachi via the Makran Coastal Highway.

- Location within Pakistan
- Location: Lasbela, Baluchistan
- Coordinates: 25°36′N 65°40′E
- Area: 6,100 square kilometres (2,400 sq mi)
- Established: 1988
- Governing body: Wildlife and Parks Department of Government of Pakistan

Hingol National Park or Hungol National Park (Urdu: ہنگول نیشنل پارک ; Balochi: پارک ملی هونگول) is the largest national park in Pakistan, located in the Makran coastal region of Balochistan along the Arabian Sea. The park covers an area of about 6,100 square kilometres (2,400 sq mi) and is located 200 km northwest of Karachi in the three districts of Gwadar, Lasbela and Awaran in Balochistan. Hingol was declared a national park in 1988.

The park is named after the Hingol River, which flows through the park and forms an estuary before emptying into the Arabian Sea. It hosts a large numbers of waterfowl and a wealth of marine life dolphins, sea turtles, mangroves, fish, and crocodiles. Hangul National Park contains several distinct ecosystems, as well as both desert and plains regions, making it unique among the national parks of Pakistan.

The park is bordered by arid subtropical forest to the north, a barren mountain range to the south, and the Hingol River tributary, which is home to thousands of migratory birds and marsh crocodiles. The Gulf of Oman and the Arabian Sea are to the south.

The park's unique rock formations have been attracting tourists from all over the country since the completion of the Makran Coastal Highway in 2004.

== Wildlife ==
Hingol National Park is a natural sanctuary for endangered wildlife in Pakistan. It is home to about 257 plant and 289 animal species, including 35 mammals, aquatic animals, amphibians, reptiles and migratory birds, including hundreds of rare species. Marsh crocodiles are regularly spotted on the coastline adjacent to Hingol National Park, and there are an estimated 60 crocodiles in various places.

The Hingul Bay has a large number of other aquatic life including Indo-Pacific dolphins and green & olive turtles, and various rare species of fish and turtles live in the coastal areas adjacent to Hangul National Park. These turtles come to the beach every night in August to lay their eggs at night. Increasing plastic pollution on the shores made it difficult for them to dig, so the female turtles left without laying eggs. Since then, the number of these turtles on the shores of Sindh and Balochistan has dropped significantly.

== Rock formations ==
Natural rock formations at Hingol

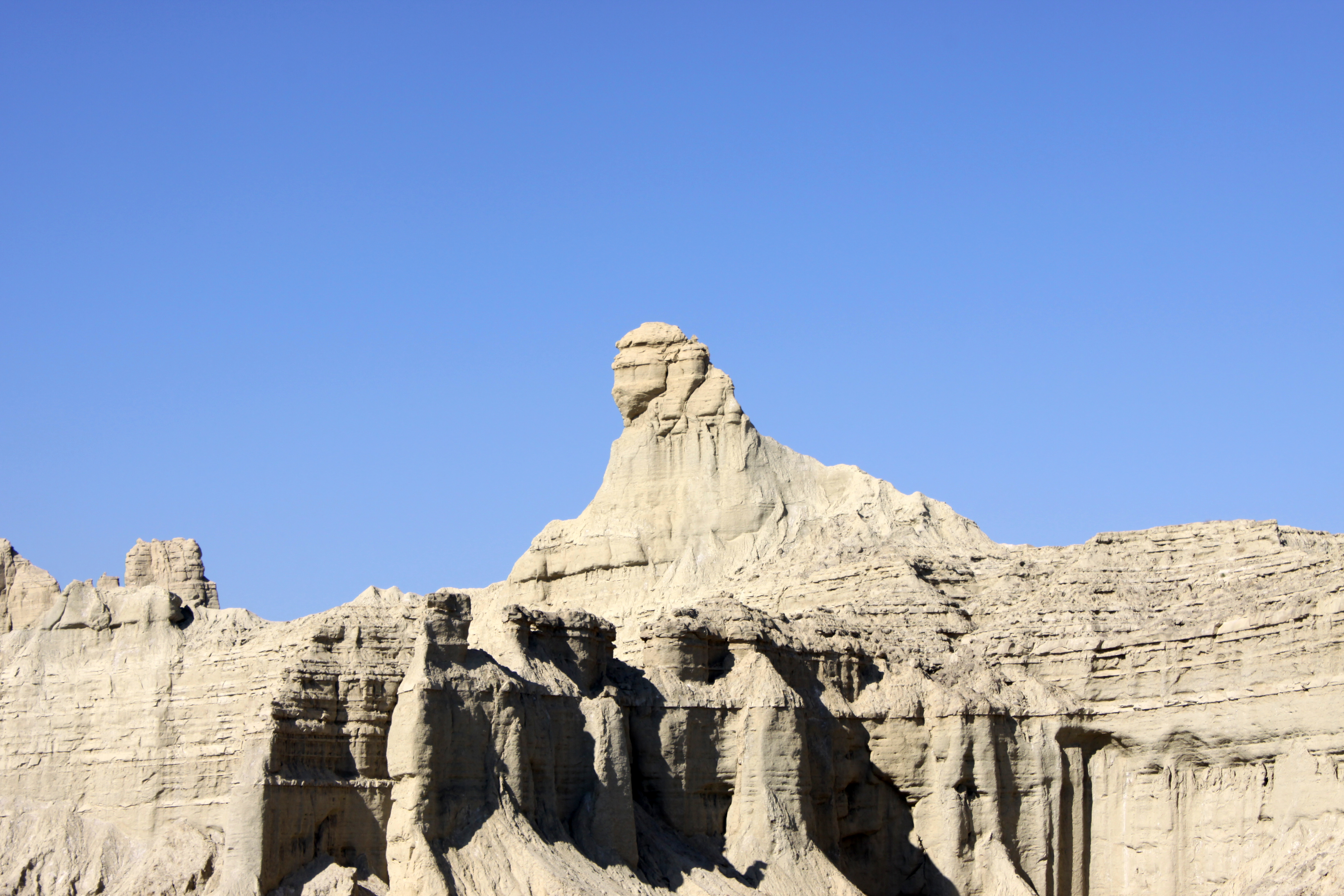
The Balochistan Sphinx

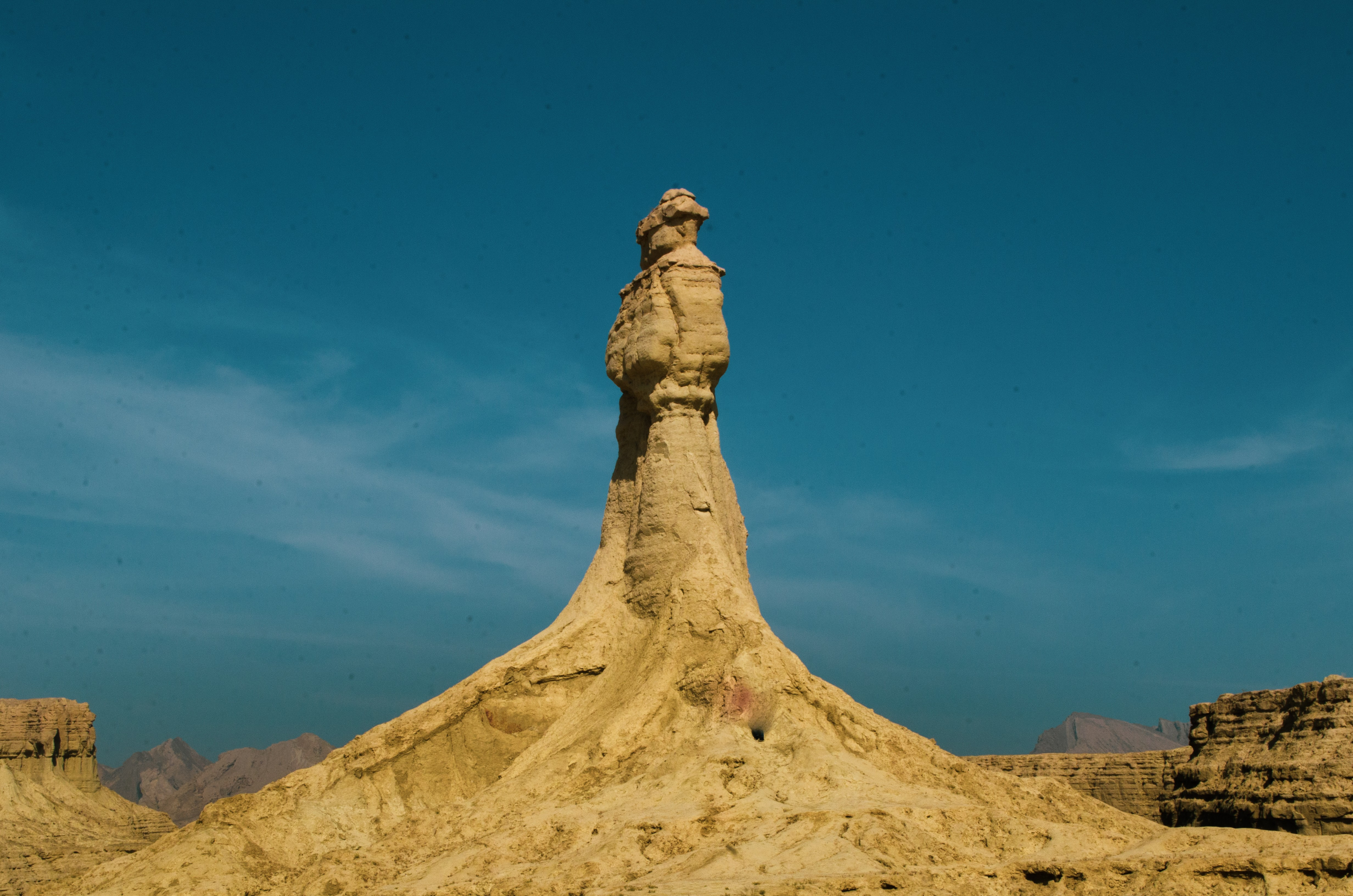
The Princess of Hope

The University of Geneva and the University of Tehran conducted a joint study on the attractive features of this coastal strip of Iran and Balochistan, in which 36 rock formations were observed. According to this research, the effective process of erosion and sedimentation has played an important role in the erosion of rocks here for centuries, in which the waves of the sea carry with them a lot of soil and other substances to the shore. Layers of soil 1 to 10 meters and in many places even thicker were observed on these rocks of different heights, which gradually increased from the beach. The tidal waves of the sea and the strong stormy winds have carved the Makran coastal strip and the adjoining mountain cliffs in such a way that at first glance the area resembles an archaeological complex preserving the remains of an ancient civilization. The most notable of these rocks are the Princess of Hope and the Balochistan Sphinx.

=== Princess of Hope ===
The most spectacular landform of Hangul National Park is a hoodoo called the Princess of Hope. Seen from afar, it resembles a large, tall statue of a woman. When American actress Angelina Jolie came to Pakistan on a UN goodwill mission in 2004, this rock formation caught her attention and inspired her to name it 'Princess of Hope'. Despite its statuesque appearance, however, the pinnacle owes its form purely to ocean winds and other natural forces of erosion.

=== Balochistan Sphinx ===
The Balochistan Sphinx, also known as the "Lion of Balochistan" or Abul-Hol, is a natural rock structure that bears resemblance to a sphinx and is visible from the Buzi Pass section of the Makran Coastal Highway.

=== Mud volcanoes ===
Hingol mud volcanoes ranging in height from 243 to 457 metres are abundant in Hingol National Park, mostly in the Mid-Hor area. According to Muhammad Hanif Bhatti, a well-known traveler from Karachi, when he first saw the Chandra Gupta mudflat in Hingol National Park in 2010 he praised the uniqueness of this natural process. At the time, the volcano was difficult to reach, but since the completion of the highway, visitors to the mud volcanoes have increased significantly.

== Hinglaj Mata mandir ==
Hinglaj Mata mandir, or Nani Mandir, is a major Hindu shrine in Pakistan and is a site of a pilgrimage bringing over 250,000 pilgrims to its location at the center of Hingol National Park every spring.

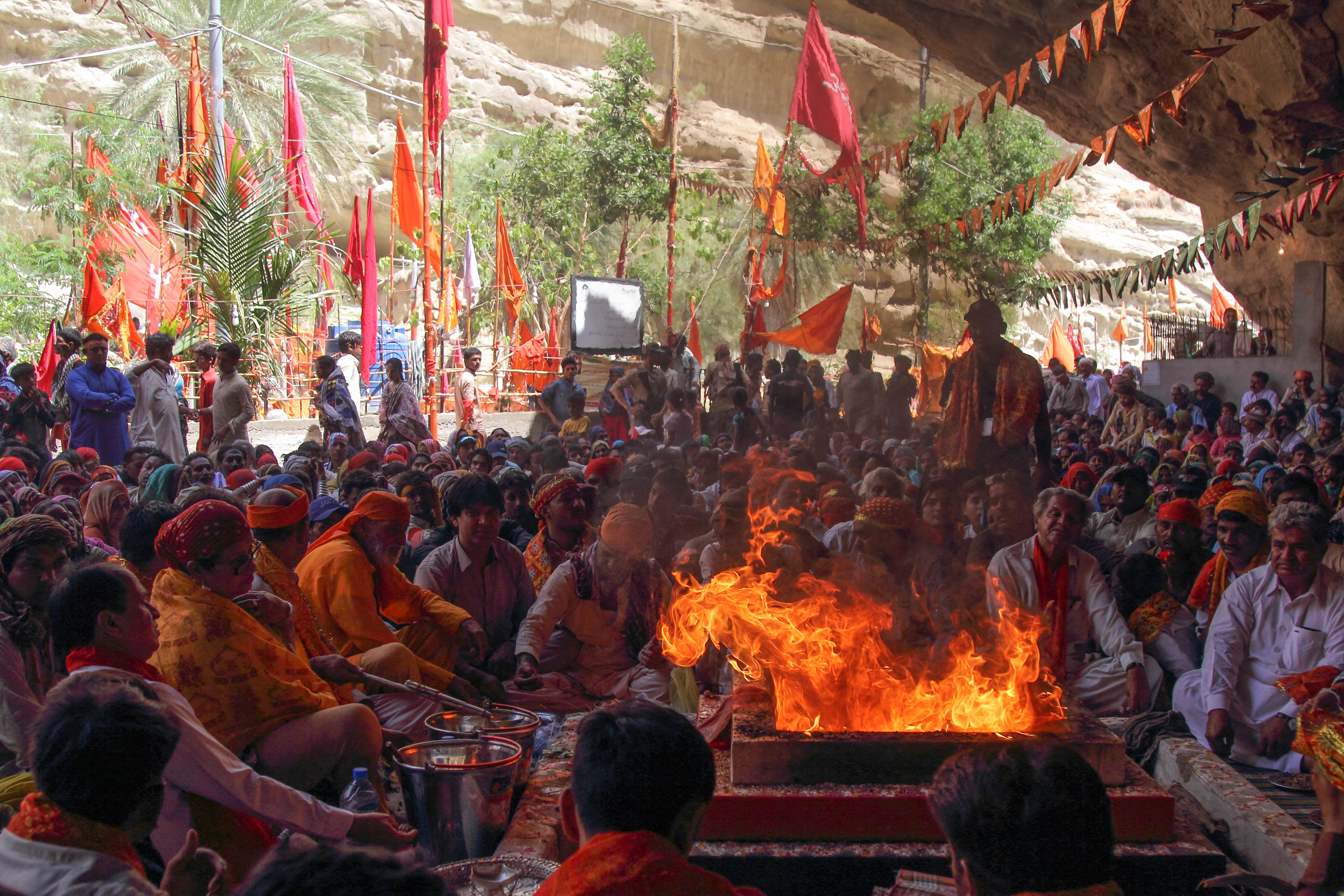
The temple's annual yatra pilgrimage Hinglaj Mata mandir

The Kali Mata temple in a cave in the Hanglaj Valley is said to be 200,000 years old. The annual festival is attended by 20,000 to 30,000 people and is organized by a committee of leading Hindus from Sindh and Balochistan. There are only four passenger compartments, so most pilgrims stay in tents, while many have to stay under trees or exposed to the sun. Apart from accommodation, the most difficult task for the pilgrims who come here is to climb the Chandra Gup Mt.

== Makran beaches ==
The beach adjacent to Kand Malir on the last corner of Hingol National Park, also known as 'Virgin Beach', was added to the list of Asia's 50 Most Beautiful Beaches in 2018. The deserts, high mountains and volcanoes along the coast add to the tourist attraction, but unlike other beaches in Pakistan, much of the tourist activity has not yet begun here. Traveling along the Makran Coastal Highway, one can easily reach Sapat Beach in Boji Koh, another beach in Balochistan. The Hangul National Park Team consists of more than 20 members, including the Wildlife Pakistan, the Provincial Department of Livestock, Environment and Tourism. But with the Government of Balochistan managing the park, many areas still require reforms. The Kand Malir beach, also known as the "Golden Beach", is considered one of the most beautiful beaches of Pakistan due to its clear water.

== Natural history ==
=== Flora ===
Hingol National Park contains a variety of topographical features and habitats, varying from thorn forest in the north to arid montane in the west. Large areas of the park are covered with drift sand and can be classified as coastal semi desert. The park includes the estuary of the Hungol River which supports a significant diversity of bird and fish species.

Some 250 plant species were recorded in the initial surveys including 7 yet undescribed species. Many more species are yet to be collected.

=== Fauna ===
Hingol National Park is known to support at least 35 species of mammals, 65 species of amphibians and reptiles, and 185 species of birds. The park forms an excellent habitat to wild Sindh ibex, Baluchistan urial, and Chinkara. Ibex is found in all steep mountain ranges and is numerous in the Hinglaj and Rodani Kacho Mountain areas. The population is estimated over 3000.

==== Mammals ====
- Persian leopard
- Caracal
- Jungle cat
- Asiatic wildcat
- Indian wolf
- Golden jackal
- White-footed fox
- Bengal fox
- Striped hyena
- Honey badger
- Afghan hedgehog
- Indian pangolin
- Balochistan gerbil
- Indian gerbil
- Hotson's mouse-like hamster
- Central Asian boar
- Sindh ibex
- Urial
- Chinkara

==== Reptiles ====
- Marsh crocodile
- Olive ridley
- Green sea turtle
- Desert monitor
- Yellow monitor
- Indian fringe-fingered lizard
- Indian sand-swimmer
- Carrot-tail viper gecko
- Melanophidium bilineatum

==== Birds ====
- Houbara bustard
- Spot-billed pelican
- Dalmatian pelican
- Bonelli's eagle
- Imperial eagle
- Golden eagle
- Tawny eagle
- Griffon vulture
- Egyptian vulture
- Cinereous vulture
- Laggar falcon
- Red-necked falcon
- Kestrel
- Brown-necked raven
- Lichtenstein's sandgrouse
- Grey francolin
- See-see partridge
- Stone-curlew
- Crowned sandgrouse
- Lichtenstein's sandgrouse
- Painted sandgrouse
- Eurasian stone-curlew
- Indian eagle-owl
- Sind woodpecker
- Siberian stonechat
- Long-billed pipit
- Grey hypocolius
- Crested lark
- Hoopoe
- Shrike
- Black bittern
- Goliath heron
- Black ibis
- Variable wheatear

==== Amphibians ====
- Skittering frog
- Indus Valley toad

== Conservation ==
There are 14 species of birds of special conservation interest on account of being threatened (as per IUCN Red List 2005), very rare or key species of the park.

- Sociable lapwing (critically endangered)
- Saker falcon (endangered))
- White-backed vulture (vulnerable)
- Spot-billed pelican (vulnerable)
- Dalmatian pelican (vulnerable)
- Eastern imperial eagle (vulnerable)
- Pallas's fish eagle (vulnerable)
- Houbara bustard (vulnerable)
- Black ibis (near-threatened)
- Black-tailed godwit(near-threatened)
- Sooty falcon (rare)
- Goliath heron (vagrant)
- Desert owl (confined to Makran Coast only)
- Brown fish owl (very rare)

== Management ==
According to independent reports, 20 staff members, 18 game watchers and 2 deputy rangers are responsible for the management of the park. They are under the guidance of the park manager, who reports to the conservator and the Secretary of Wildlife, Forest, Livestock, Environment and Tourism.

== Photo gallery ==
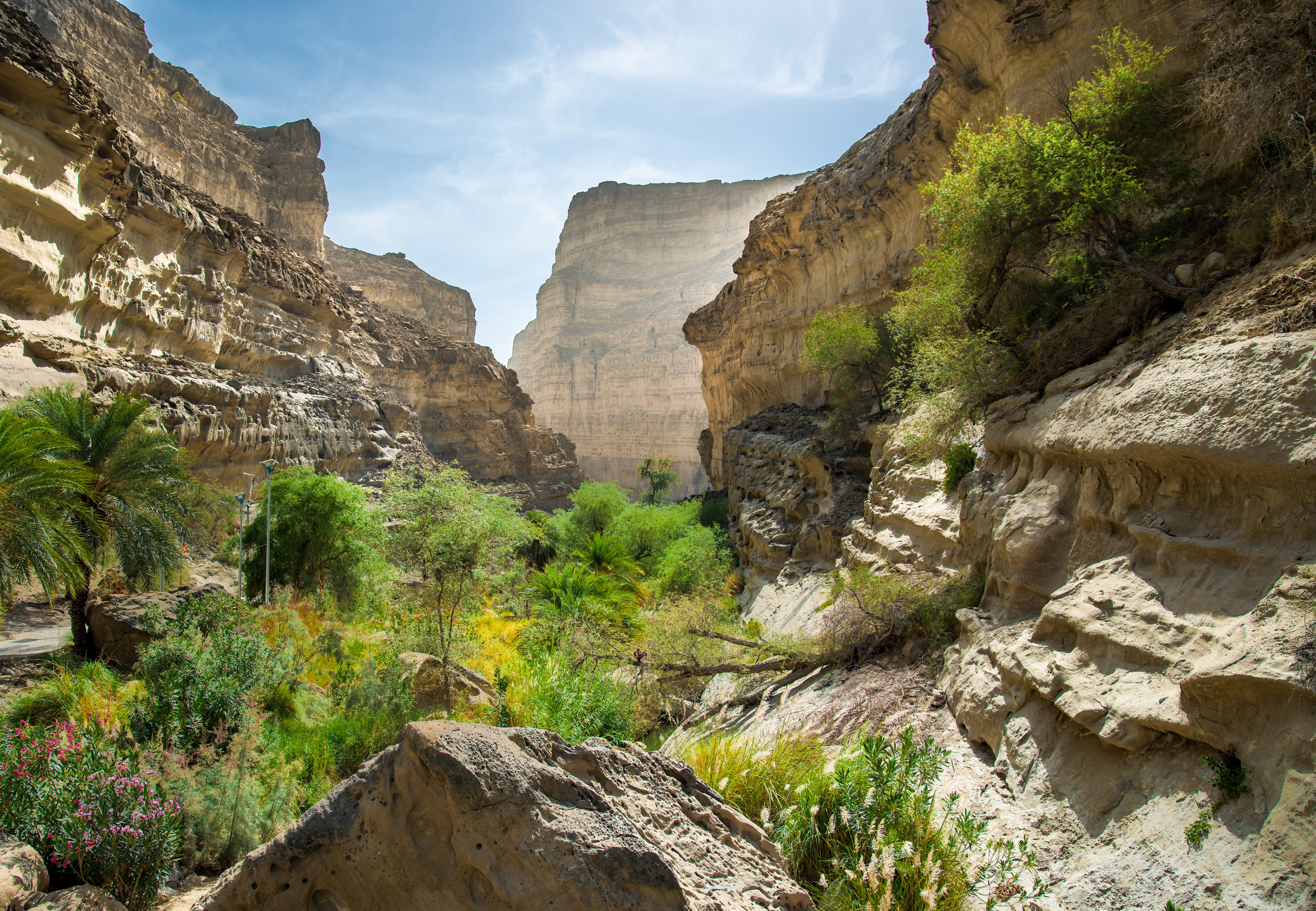
Canyons at the national park

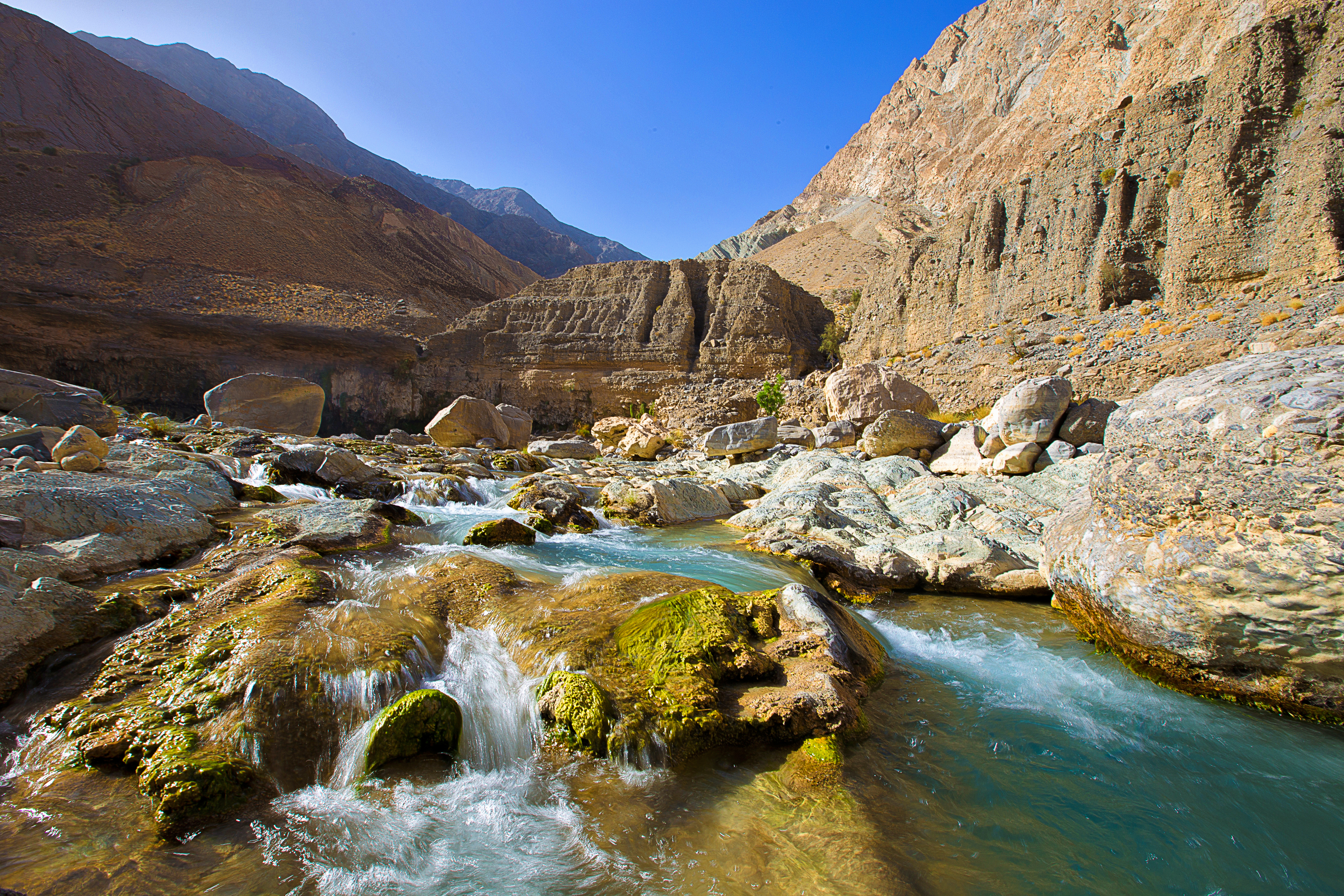
Chotok Waterfalls

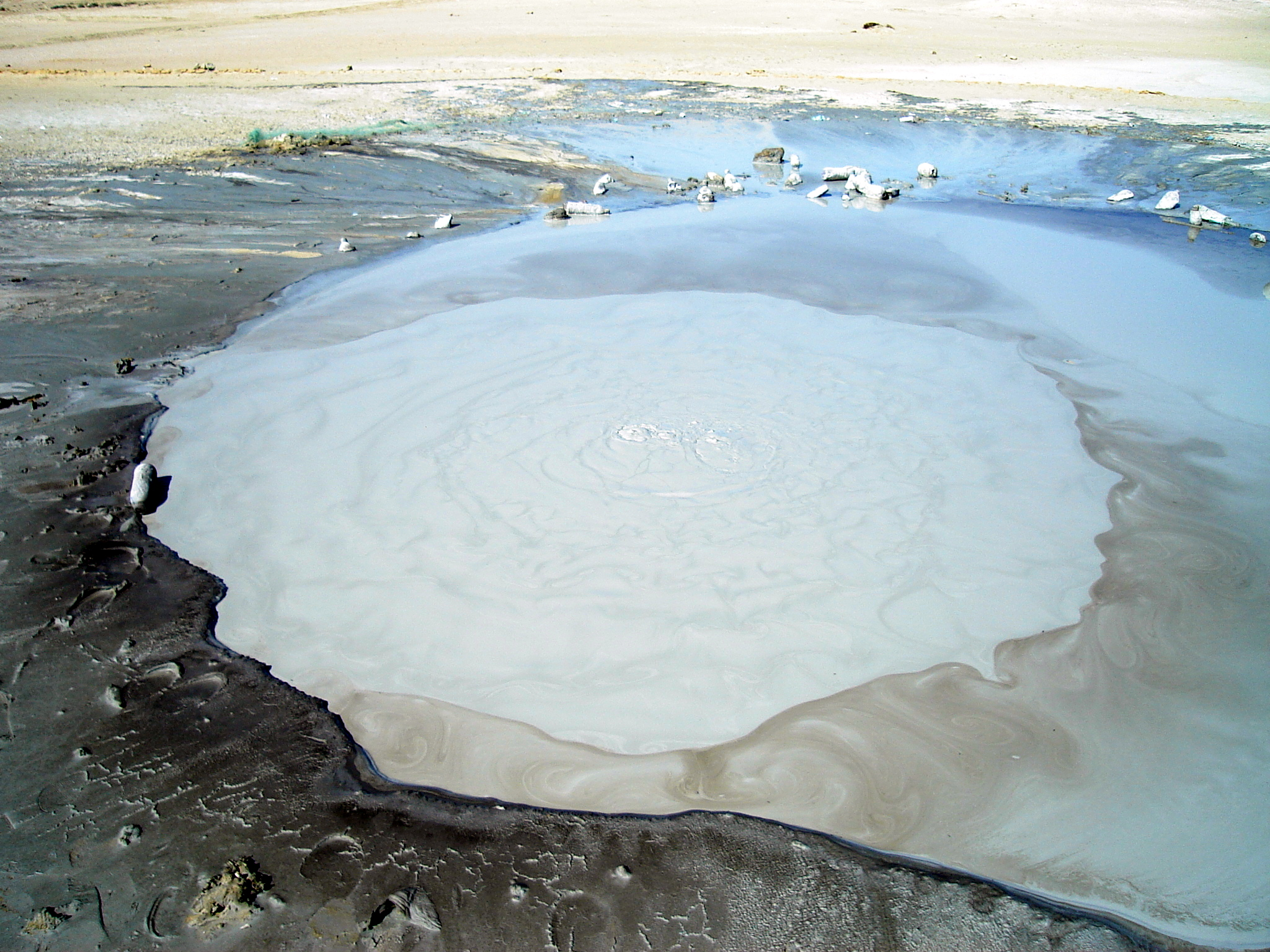
Hingol mud volcano

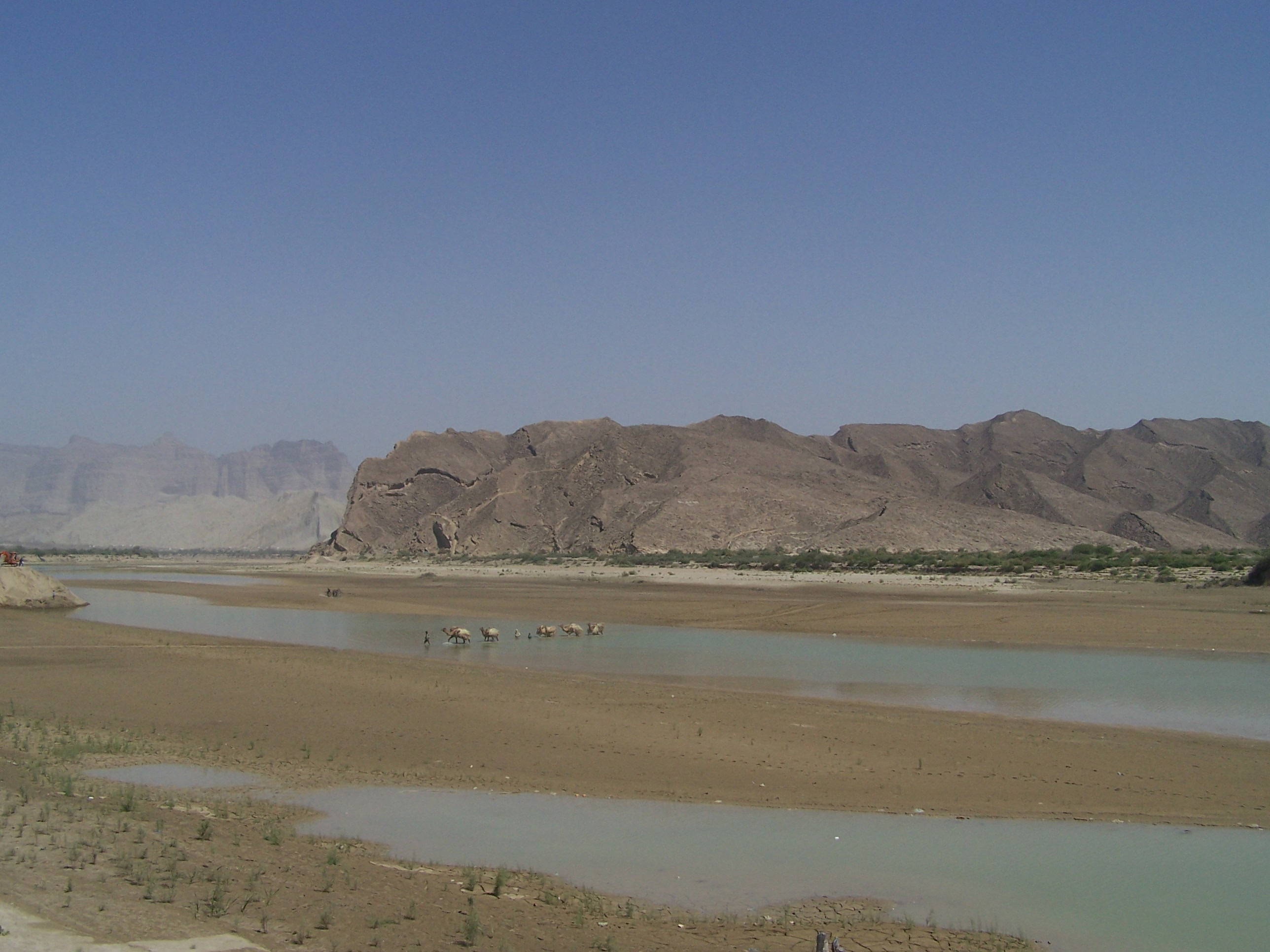
Hungol River estuary wetlands, and mesas

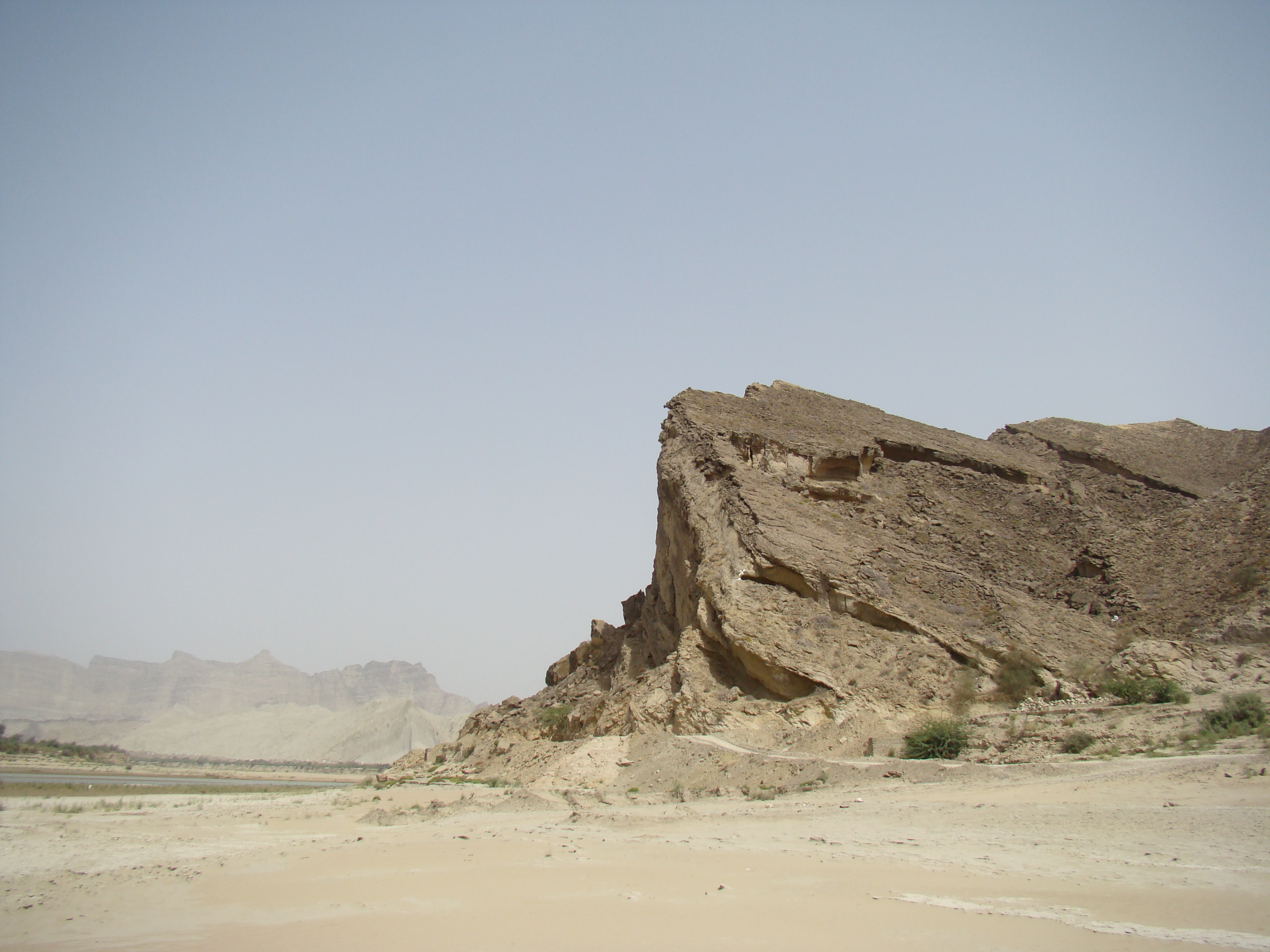
Rock formation and dunes

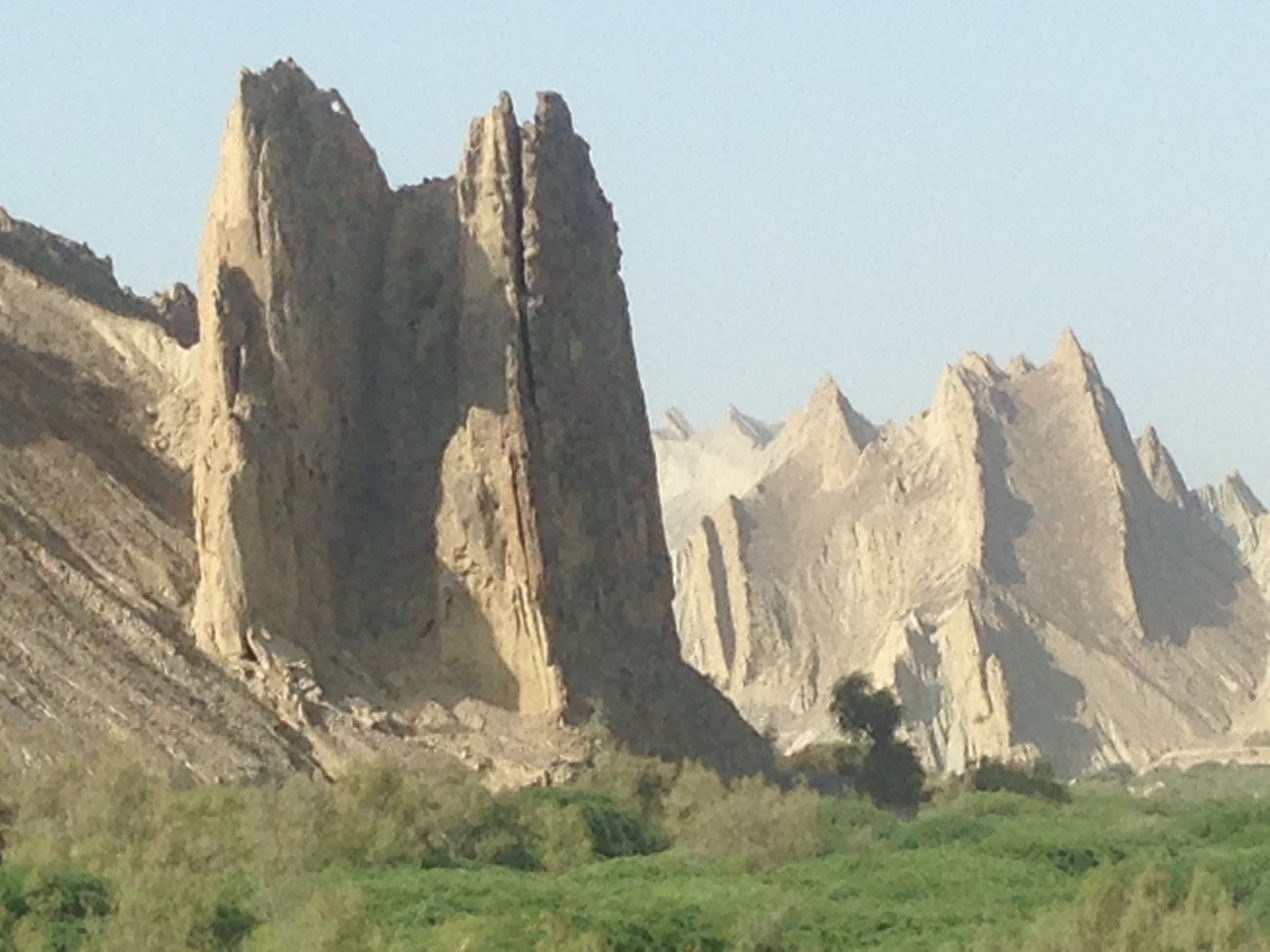
Rock formation

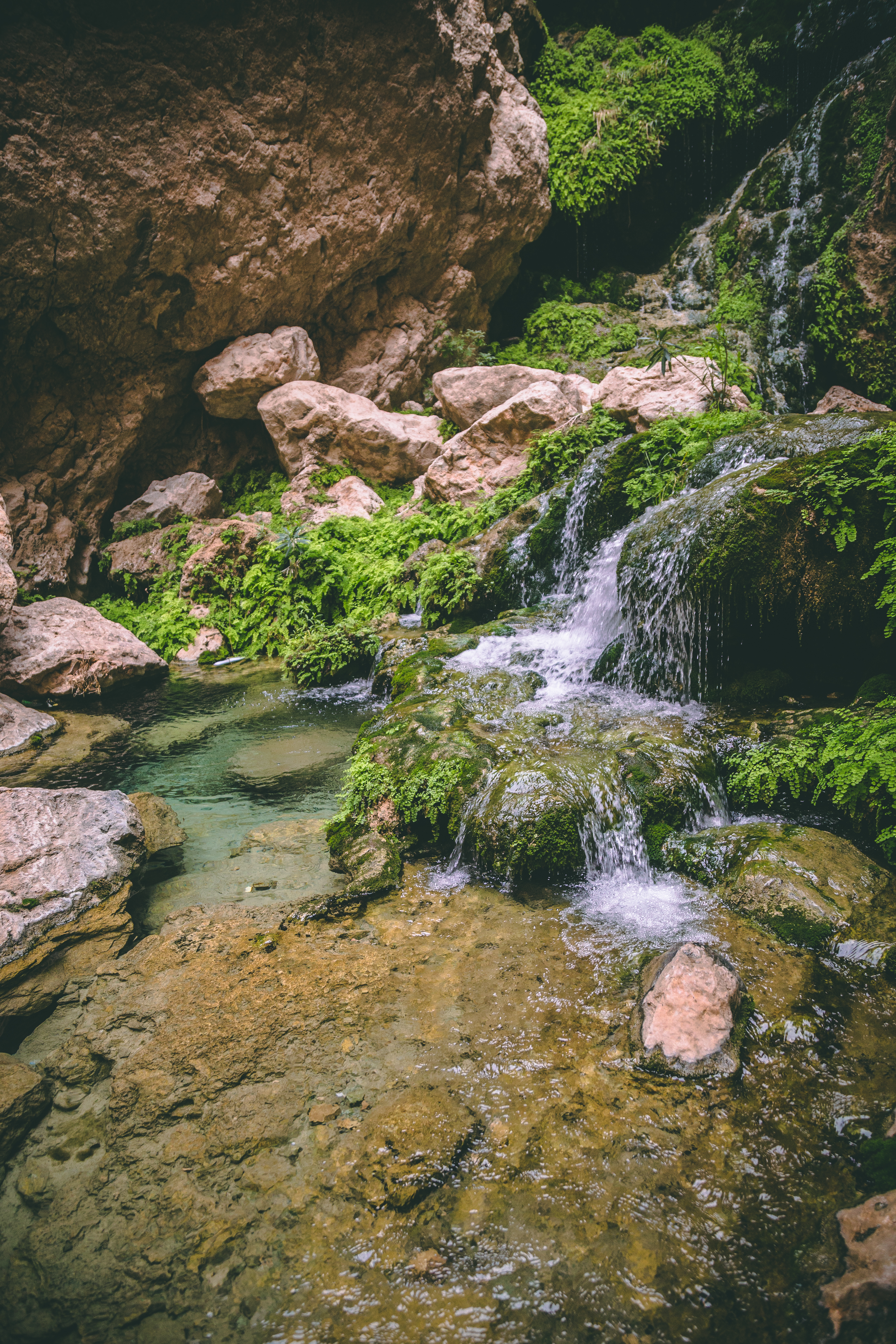
Chotok waterfalls

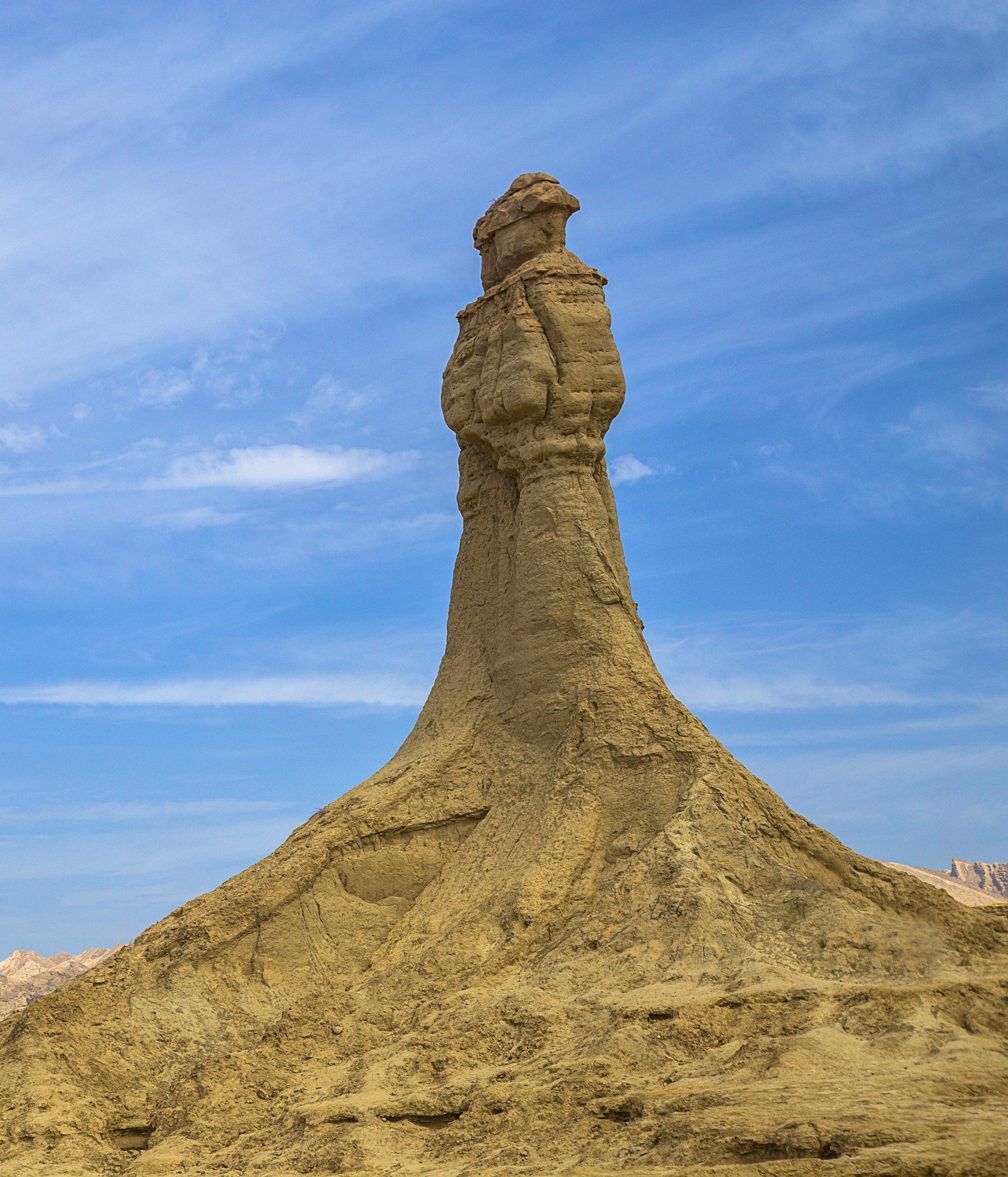
The so-called Princess of Hope at the Park

== See also ==
- Hingol mud volcano
- Makran
- Natural history of Balochistan, Pakistan
