= Basol River =

River in Pakistan

Coordinates: 25°19′N 64°13′E

Basol River (Urdu: دریائے با سول) is a river that flows southward in the Gwadar District of Balochistan Province, in southwestern Pakistan.

The Basol River drains a desert area of the Makran region, with its river mouth at Khor Kalmat lagoon on the Gulf of Oman, of the Arabian Sea.

The Basol is said to be one of Balochistan’s four coastal rivers, in addition to the Hingol, Hub and Kech rivers, that support a healthy crocodile population. The rainwater that the Basol and the other three rivers rely on leaves behind small and big ponds that serve as habitats for the crocodiles.
