= Buddhism in Pakistan =

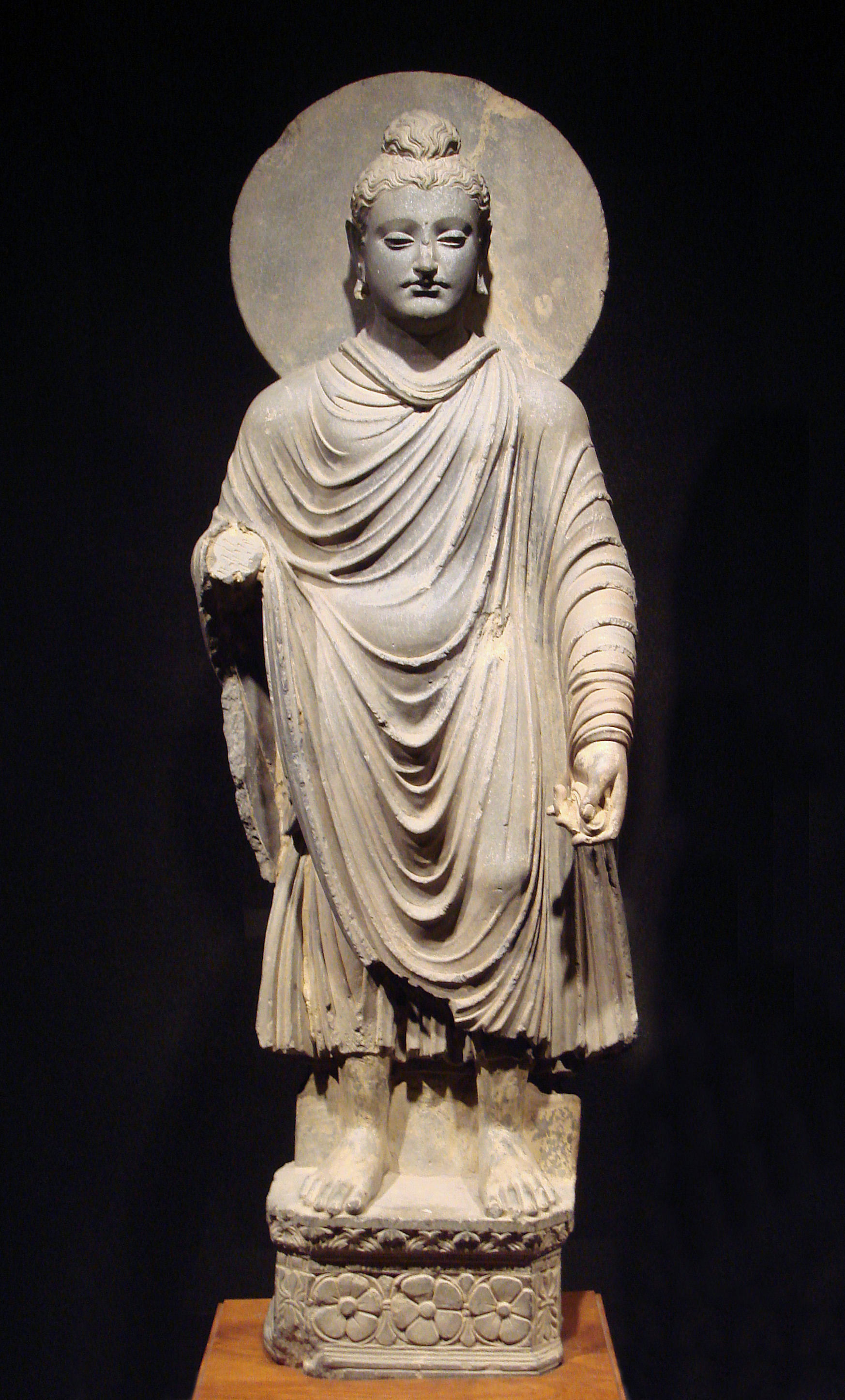
Standing Buddha from Gandhara, 1st–2nd century CE (Peshawar basin, Pakistan)

In 2012, the National Database and Registration Authority (NADRA) of Pakistan indicated that the contemporary Buddhist population of Pakistan was minuscule, with 1,492 adult holders of national identity cards (CNICs). The total population of Buddhists is therefore unlikely to be more than a few thousand. In 2017, the number of Buddhist voters was stated to be 1,884, and they were mostly concentrated in Sindh and Punjab.

Buddhism first reached what is now Pakistan during Ashoka’s reign when he sent a monk from Varanasi called Majjhantika to preach in Kashmir and Gandhara following the Third Buddhist council in Pataliputra.

The Major Rock Edicts of Ashoka inscribed on rock boulders in Mansehra and Shahbaz Garhi written in the Kharosthi script recording aspects of the emperor's dharma or righteous law represent some of the earliest evidence of deciphered writing in South Asia, dating to middle of the third century BCE. The Indo-Greek king Menander embraced Buddhism as attested in the Milinda Panha, which dates from sometime between 100 BC and 200 AD, following a dialogue with the monk Nāgasena in Sagala, present-day Sialkot.

In the Gandhara region, Greco-Buddhist art and sculptures flourished.

Buddhism thrived until the 6th century, when the religion began to decline after the invasion by Alchon Huns, until by the end of the 14th century, Buddhism had largely disappeared following the muslim conquests in the Indian subcontinent.

The only functional Buddhist temple in Pakistan is in the Diplomatic Enclave at Islamabad, used by Buddhist diplomats from countries like Sri Lanka. Recently in 2023, Fo Guang Shan, a large international Buddhist organization has been invited by the Pakistani government to reconnect the local indigenous Buddhist population to the faith by organizing event, reciting prayers and singing hymns to praise the Buddha in the local tongue.

== History ==
Buddhism first reached the Gandhara following the Third Buddhist Council where Ashoka sent missionaries to the region. As per Buddhist tradition, a monk from Varanasi in India called Majjhantika is held to be the first monk to travel to Kashmir and Gandhara to spread Buddhism under the orders of Ashoka.

Buddhism became prominent in merchant communities and then spread throughout the Mauryan empire through commercial connections and along trade routes. In this way, Buddhism also spread through the silk route into Central Asia. Ashoka's embrace of Buddhism and sponsorship of Buddhist missionaries allowed for the expansion of that faith into Sri Lanka, Northwestern India, and Central Asia. Mauryan control over the northwestern frontier is attested from the Rock Edicts left by Ashoka in Mansehra and Shahbaz Garhi.

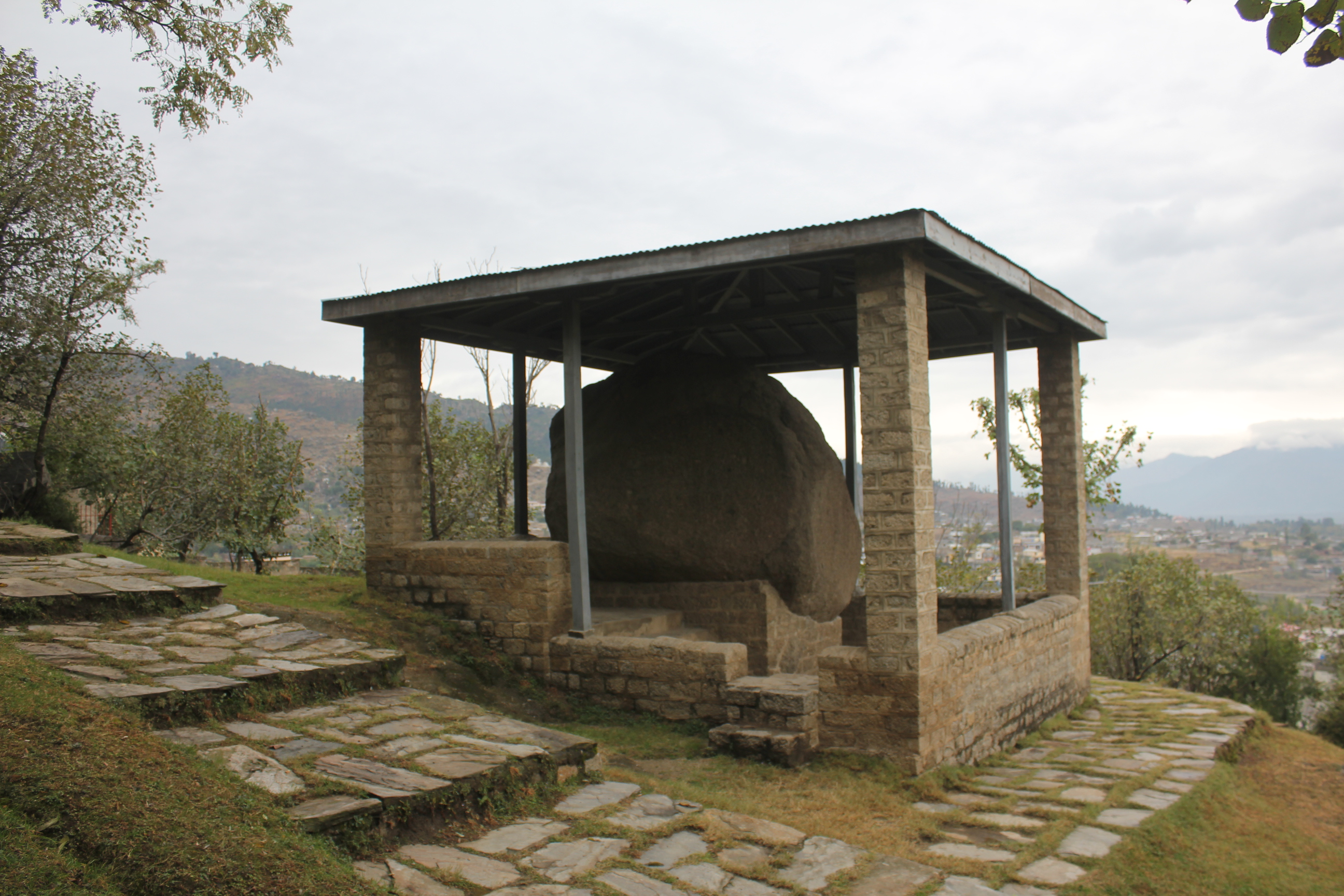
Major Rock Edict of Ashoka in Mansehra.

In the 2nd century B.C., Demetrius I invaded the Indian Subcontinent, establishing the Indo-Greek kingdom. One of the most famous Indo-Greek kings Menander, converted to Buddhism following a dialogue with the monk Nāgasena in Sagala, present-day Sialkot. Direct cultural exchange is described by a dialogue called the Debate of King Milinda (Milinda Pañha) which recounts the discussion between Menander and the Buddhist monk Nāgasena, who was himself a student of the Greek Buddhist monk Mahadharmaraksita. Upon Menander's death, the honor of sharing his remains was claimed by the cities under his rule, and they were enshrined in stupas, in a parallel with the historic Buddha. Several of Menander's Indo-Greek successors inscribed "Follower of the Dharma," in the Kharoṣṭhī script, on their coins.

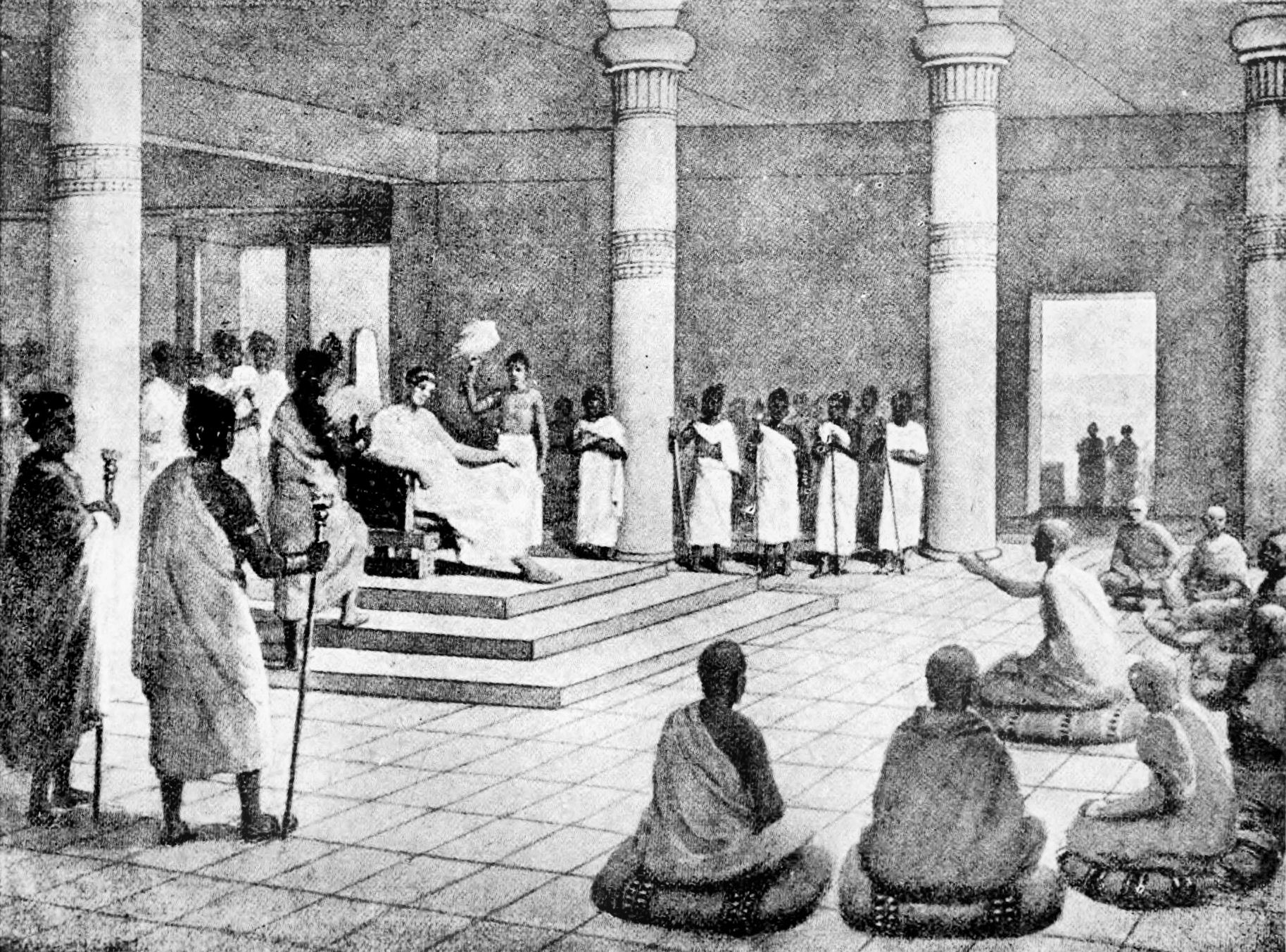
King Milinda and Nagasena.

During the two centuries of their rule, the Indo-Greek kings combined the Greek and Indian languages and symbols, as seen on their coins, and blended Greek and Indian ideas, as seen in the archaeological remains. The diffusion of Indo-Greek culture had consequences which are still felt today, particularly through the influence of Greco-Buddhist art.

Following the foundation of the Kushan empire by the invading Yuezhi nomads in the 1st century BCE, the Kushans adopted elements of the Hellenistic culture of the Indo-Greeks. During Kushan rule, Gandharan Buddhism was at the height of its influence and a significant number of Buddhist centers were built or renovated.

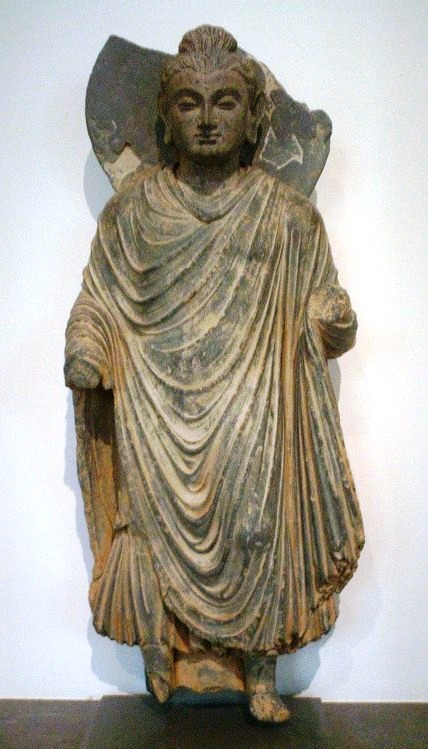
Standing Buddha, Gandhara, 1st century AD.

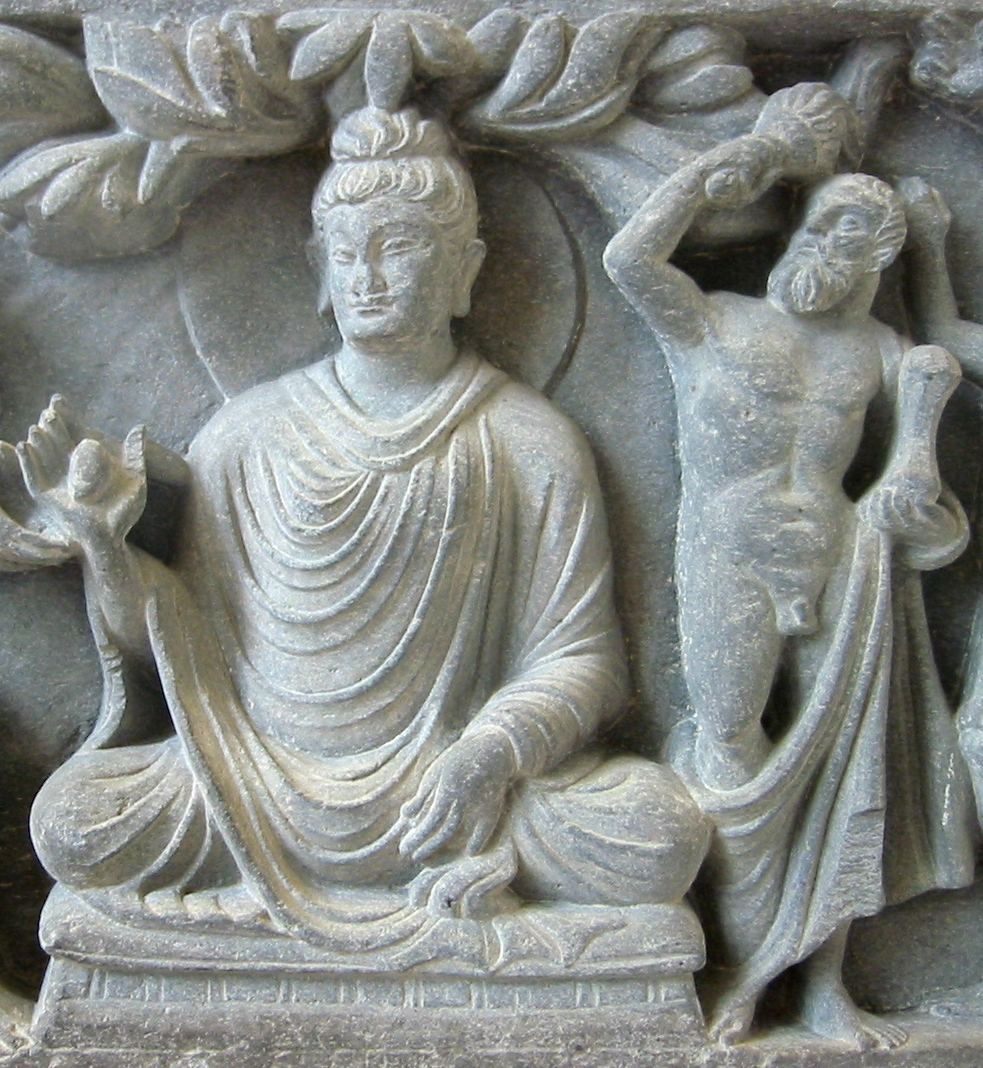
Herculean depiction of Vajrapani (right), as the protector of the Buddha, 2nd century AD Gandhara, British Museum.

The Buddhist art of Gandhara was a synthesis of Hellenistic and Indian elements. The Gandhāran Buddhist texts also date from this period. Written in Gāndhārī Prakrit, they are the oldest Buddhist manuscripts yet discovered (c. 1st century CE). According to Richard Salomon, most of them belong to the Dharmaguptaka school. Emperor Kanishka is particularly known for his support of Buddhism. During his reign, stupas and monasteries were built in the Gandhāra. Kushan royal support and the opening of trade routes allowed Gandharan Buddhism to spread along the Silk Road to Central Asia, the Tarim Basin and thus to China.

Between the 5th and 8th centuries, Chinese scholars traveling through the region, such as Faxian, Xuanzang, Yijing, Hui-sheng, and Sung-Yun, began to speak of a decline of the Buddhist Sangha in the northwestern parts of Indian subcontinent, especially in the wake of the Alchon Hun invasion from Central Asia in the 6th century CE. Xuanzang wrote that numerous monasteries in north-western Indian subcontinent had been reduced to ruins by the Huns.

The Alchons apparently undertook the mass destruction of Buddhist monasteries and stupas at Taxila, a high center of learning, which never recovered from the destruction. Virtually all of the Alchon coins found in the area of Taxila were found in the ruins of burned down monasteries, where apparently some of the invaders died alongside local defenders during the wave of destructions. It is thought that the Kanishka stupa, one of the most famous and tallest buildings in antiquity, was destroyed by them during their invasion of the area in the 460s CE. The Mankiala stupa was also vandalized during their invasions.

Mihirakula in particular is remembered by Buddhist sources to have been a "terrible persecutor of the religion". During the reign of Mihirakula, over one thousand Buddhist monasteries are said to have been destroyed. In particular, the writings of Chinese monk Xuanzang from 630 CE explained that Mihirakula ordered the destruction of Buddhism and the expulsion of monks. Indeed, the Buddhist art of Gandhara, in particular Greco-Buddhist art, becomes essentially extinct around that period. When Xuanzang visited Gandhara in c. 630 CE, he reported that Buddhism had drastically declined, and that most of the monasteries were deserted and left in ruins.

According to Peter Harvey, the religion recovered slowly from these invasions during the 7th century, with the "Buddhism of Punjab and Sindh remaining strong".

However, the religion further declined following the Muslim conquests in the Indian subcontinent. As early as the 8th century, Arab conquerors conquered the southern part of present-day Pakistan. The Buddhist monk Xuanzang observed that Buddhism was already declining in the Sindh region when he visited in the 7th century. While Buddhism declined and ultimately disappeared after Arab conquest mainly due to conversion of almost all of the Buddhist population of Sindh to Islam. Derryl Maclean attributes the decline of Buddhism in Sindh to the socio-economic differences between Hinduism and Buddhism in the region, with Buddhism being mainly urban and mercantile, while Hinduism was rural and non-mercantile. The Arabs attracted and converted the Buddhist classes, but for the rural and non-mercantile parts, they promoted a more decentralized authority and appointed Brahmins for the task.

In a second wave, from the 10th through the 12th centuries, the Ghaznavids overtook Gandhara and Punjab. The Persian traveller Al Biruni's memoirs suggest Buddhism had vanished from the medieval Punjab region by the early 11th century. By the end of the twelfth century, Buddhism had further disappeared, with the conquest of the Ghaznavids. Buddhism survived confined in the northern region of Gilgit Baltistan until 13–14th century, perhaps slightly longer in the nearby Swat Valley.

=== Destruction of Buddhist relics ===
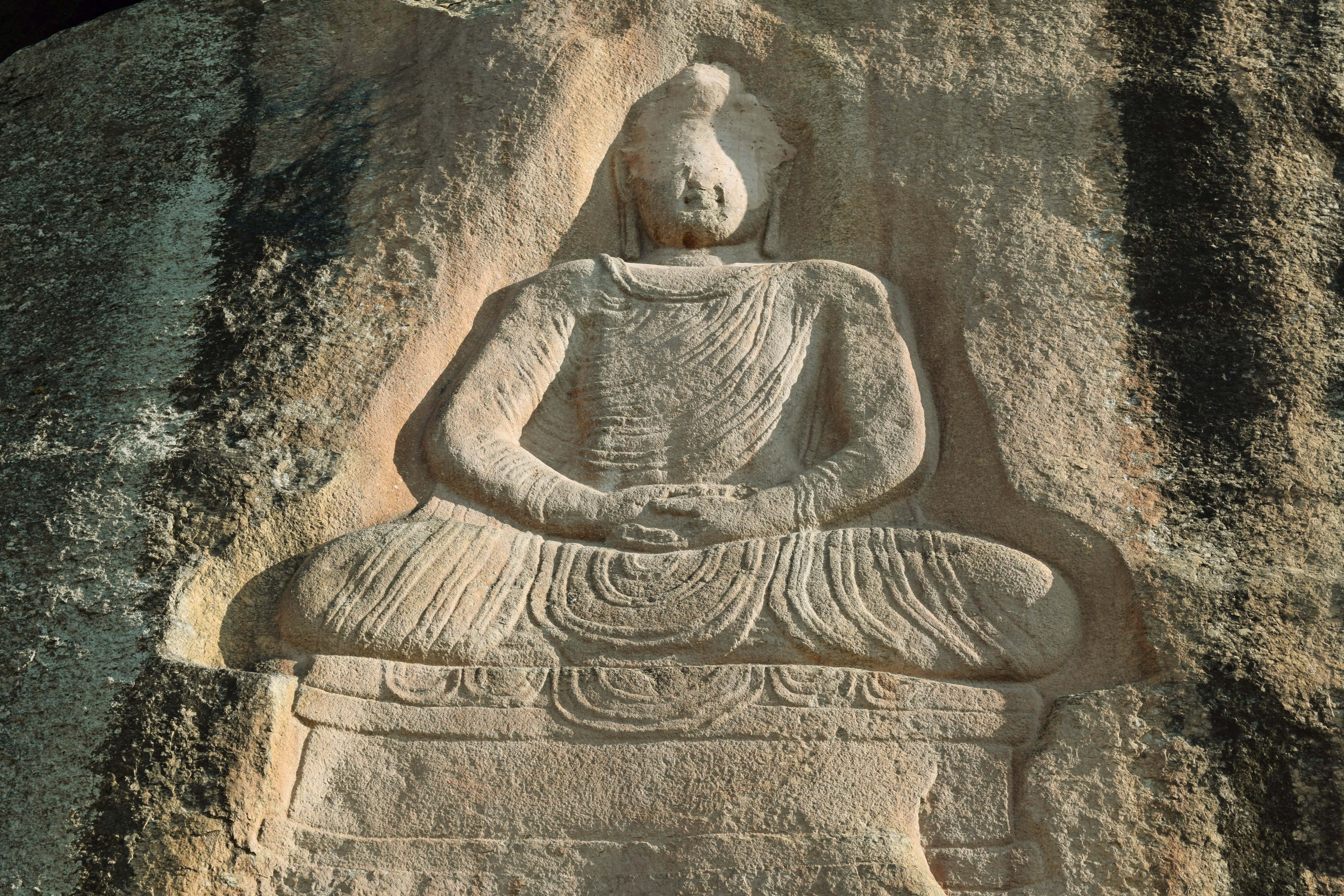
Buddhist rock carving in Manglawar damaged by the Taliban

The Swat Valley in Pakistan has many Buddhist carvings and stupas, and Jehanabad contains a Seated Buddha statue. Kushan-era Buddhist stupas and statues in Swat valley were demolished by the foreign-funded Taliban and after two attempts by them, the Jehanabad Buddha's face was destroyed by dynamite. Only the Bamiyan Buddhas were larger than the carved giant Buddha statue in Swat near Mangalore. The government did nothing to safeguard the statue after the initial attempt at destroying it, which did not cause permanent damage, but when the second attack took place on the statue, its feet, shoulders and face were demolished. Islamists such as the Taliban and looters destroyed much of Pakistan's Buddhist artifacts left over from the Buddhist Gandhara civilization, especially in Swat Valley. The Taliban deliberately targeted Gandhara Buddhist relics for destruction. The Christian Archbishop of Lahore Lawrence John Saldanha wrote a letter to Pakistan's government denouncing the Taliban activities in Swat Valley including their destruction of Buddha statues and their attacks on Christians, Sikhs, and Hindus. Gandhara Buddhist artifacts were also looted by smugglers. A group of Italians helped repair the Buddha at Jahan Abad, Swat.

In the 1970s and 1980s, many of the Buddhist relics in the Peshawar Museum were replaced with fake replicas and the original artefacts went missing. In 2012, police officers destroyed and damaged recovered Buddhist artefacts from smugglers at their police station. In 2012, the Fasting Buddha Gandharan statue was damaged due to untrained staff at the Lahore Museum using epoxy to clean it. Rare Buddhist statues stolen by a smuggling ring in 2012 were recovered among 395 objects from Awami Colony in Korangi but were thrown in the garbage by the National Museum in Karachi in 2017. In 2020, a 1,700-year-old life-sized Gandharan Buddhist statue that was uncovered during excavation work was deliberately destroyed in Takhbhai, Khyber Pakhtunkhwa by workers with a sledge-hammer after a local Muslim cleric urged it by claiming the local contractor's imaan (faith) and nikah (marriage) invalid/annulled if they did not destroy the statue. FIRS were lodged under the K-P Antiquity Act, 2016. Some inhabitants of the country believe that allowing Buddhist monuments to exist are contrary to Islam. The poor functioning of Pakistani institutions meant to preserve Buddhist heritage has been attributed to large-scale corruption, indifference, and neglect.

=== Buddhism in modern Pakistan ===
Tridev Roy, the Chakma chief, supported Pakistan during the 1971 Bangladesh Liberation War; he then left the Chittagong region and settled in Pakistan. He claimed to represent the Buddhists of Pakistan by founding and chairing the "Pakistan Buddhist Society" from 1996 until his death in 2012. His family stayed behind in Bangladesh.

As per NADRA data, around 1,884 holders declared themselves as Buddhists. A small community of nomadic Baori Buddhists, perhaps numbering 16,000, remain in Sindh and the Rohi region of South Punjab. In rural Sindh, around 650 families follow Buddhism in Ghotki, Sanghar, Khairpur, Nawabshah, and Nowshahro Firoz. In Bahawalpur, a local Baori Buddhist temple was destroyed as revenge for the December 1992 Babri Masjid incident. The community has no temples, stupas or monks. The Buddhist community gathers annually at Baba Ghoosai. They maintain a moorat symbol dedicated to Buddha in their houses. A delegation representing the community from Naushahro Feroze District led by Lala Muneer attended the Gandhara exhibition Roots or Routes: Exploring Pakistan’s Buddhist and Jain Histories at the Taxila Museum in 2021. Lala Rajoo Raam is the representative of the Baori Buddhists community. He is also a councillor for Chak number 75 DB, Union Council number 88. He also twice contested elections for the Punjab assembly. Another political representative for the community is Isphanyar M. Bhandara.

== Archaeological sites ==
=== Khyber Pakhtunkhwa ===
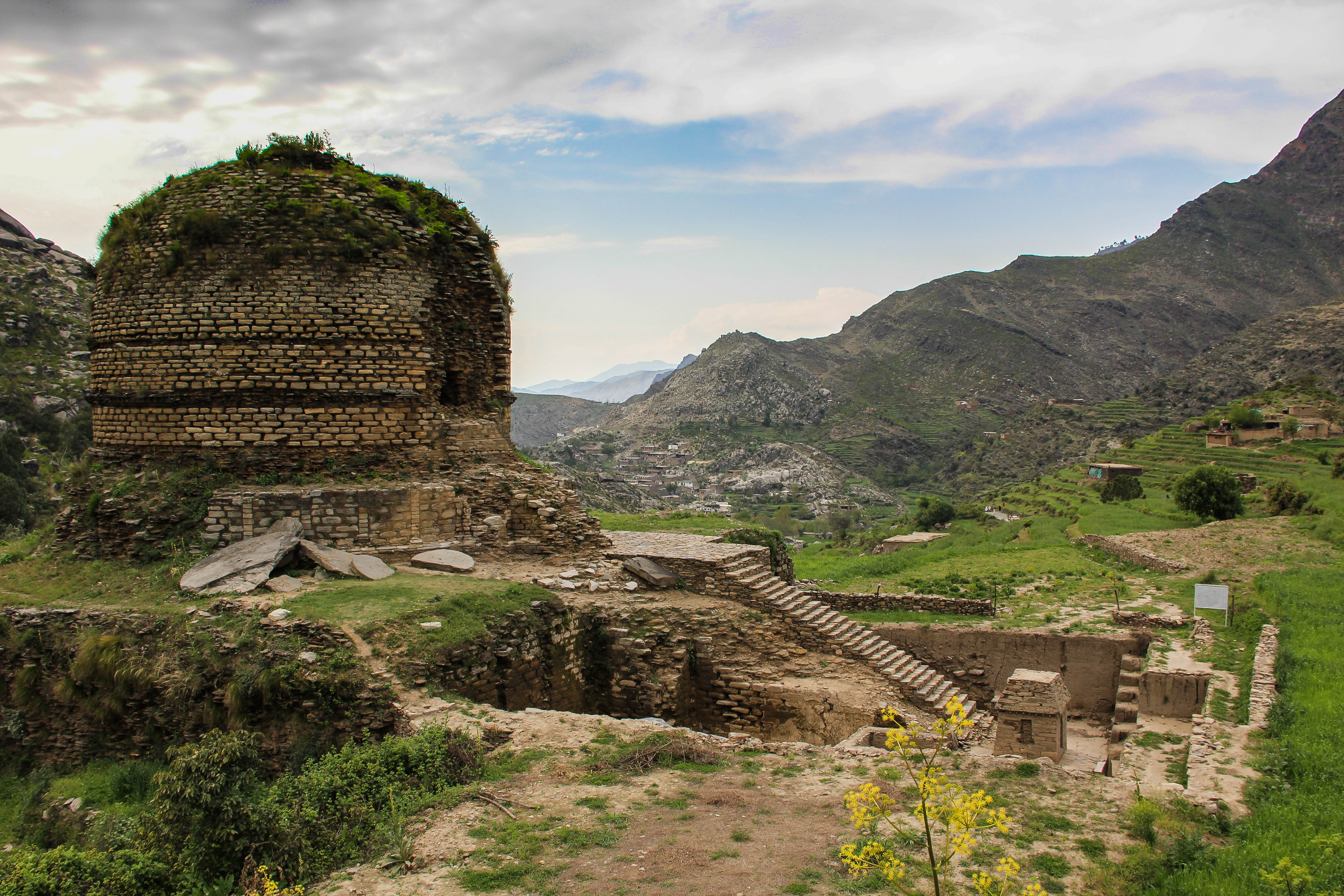
Amluk-Dara Stupa in the Swat Valley.

Famed for its unique Gandharan style of art which is heavily influenced by the classical Greek and Hellenistic styles, Gandhara attained its height from the 1st century to the 5th century CE under the Kushan Empire, who had their capital at Peshawar (Puruṣapura).

The monastic complex called Takht-i-Bahi is located in the Mardan district. It was unearthed in the early 20th century, and in 1980, it was included in the UNESCO World Heritage list as the largest Buddhist remains in Gandhara, along with the Seri Bahlol urban remains that date back to the same period, located about a kilometer south.

The ancient region of Oddiyana has been located by some in the present-day Swat Valley. Oddiyana is ascribed importance in the development and dissemination of Vajrayāna Buddhism. It was also called as “the paradise of the Ḍākinīs”. Padmasambhava, the eighth-century Buddhist master who was instrumental in the introduction of Buddhism to Tibet, is believed to have been born in Oddiyana.

=== Punjab ===
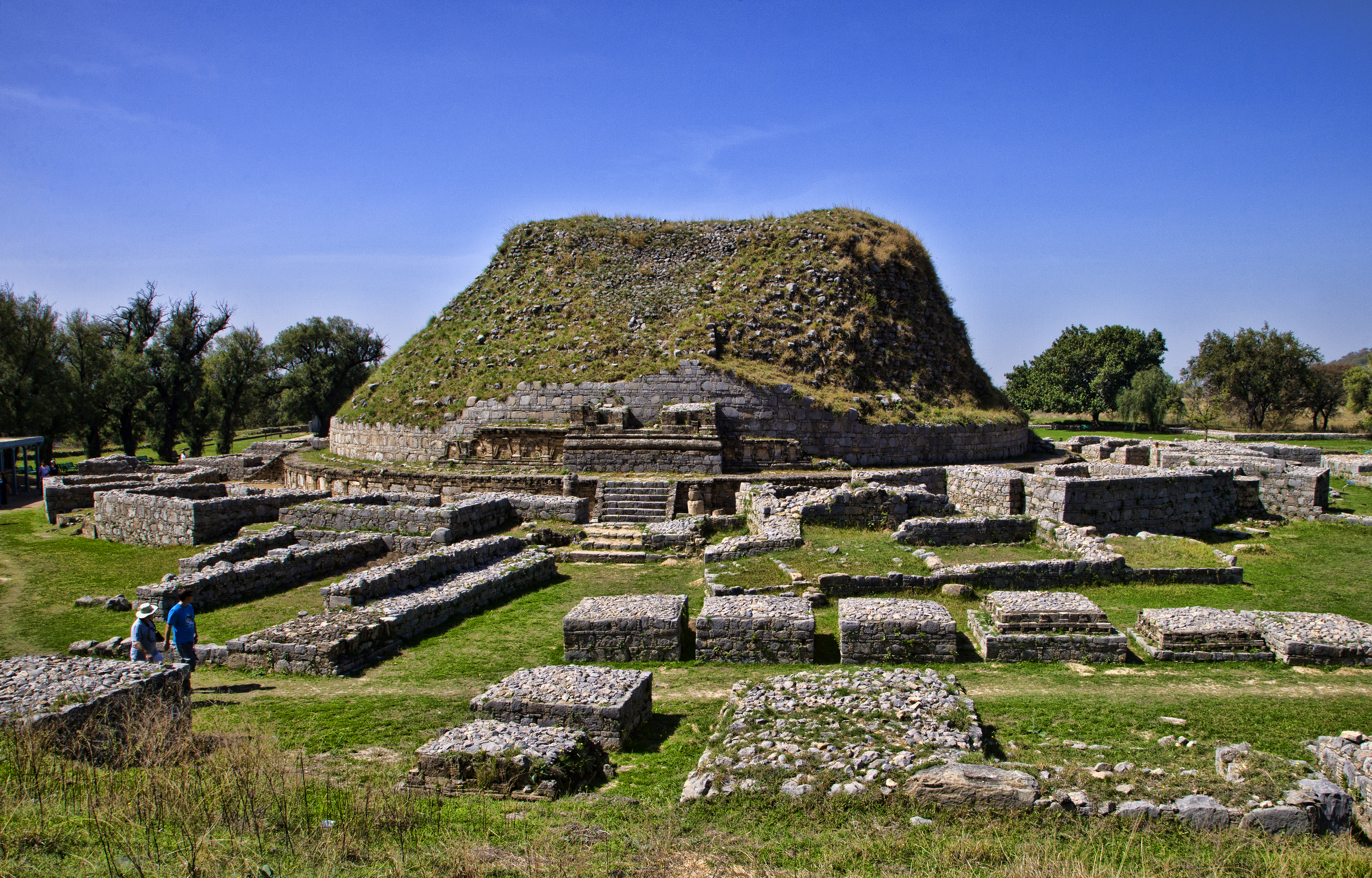
Ruins of Dharmarajika Stupa in Taxila. It was destroyed during the Hunnic invasions in the 6th century.

Most of the archaeological sites of Taxila are located around Taxila Museum. For over 1,000 years, Taxila remained famous as a center of learning Gandharan art of sculpture, architecture, education and Buddhism in the days of Buddhist glory. There are over 50 archaeological sites scattered around Taxila. Some of the most important sites are the Dhamarajika Stupa and Monastery (300 BC – 200 AD), Bhir Mound (600–200 BC), Sirkap (200 BC – 600 AD), Jandial Temple (c.250 BC) and Jaulian Monastery (200 – 600 AD).

A museum comprising various sections with rich archaeological finds of Taxila, arranged in chronological order and properly labeled, has been established close to the site.

=== Islamabad Capital territory ===
The main Buddhist site around this area are the Shah Allah Ditta caves on the Margalla Hills. They are believed to be 2400 years old and are decorated with Buddhist era murals. The caves were first used by Buddhist monks for meditation, and later by Hindu Sadhus and also afterwards by Muslim ascetics in the Mughal era.

=== Sindh ===
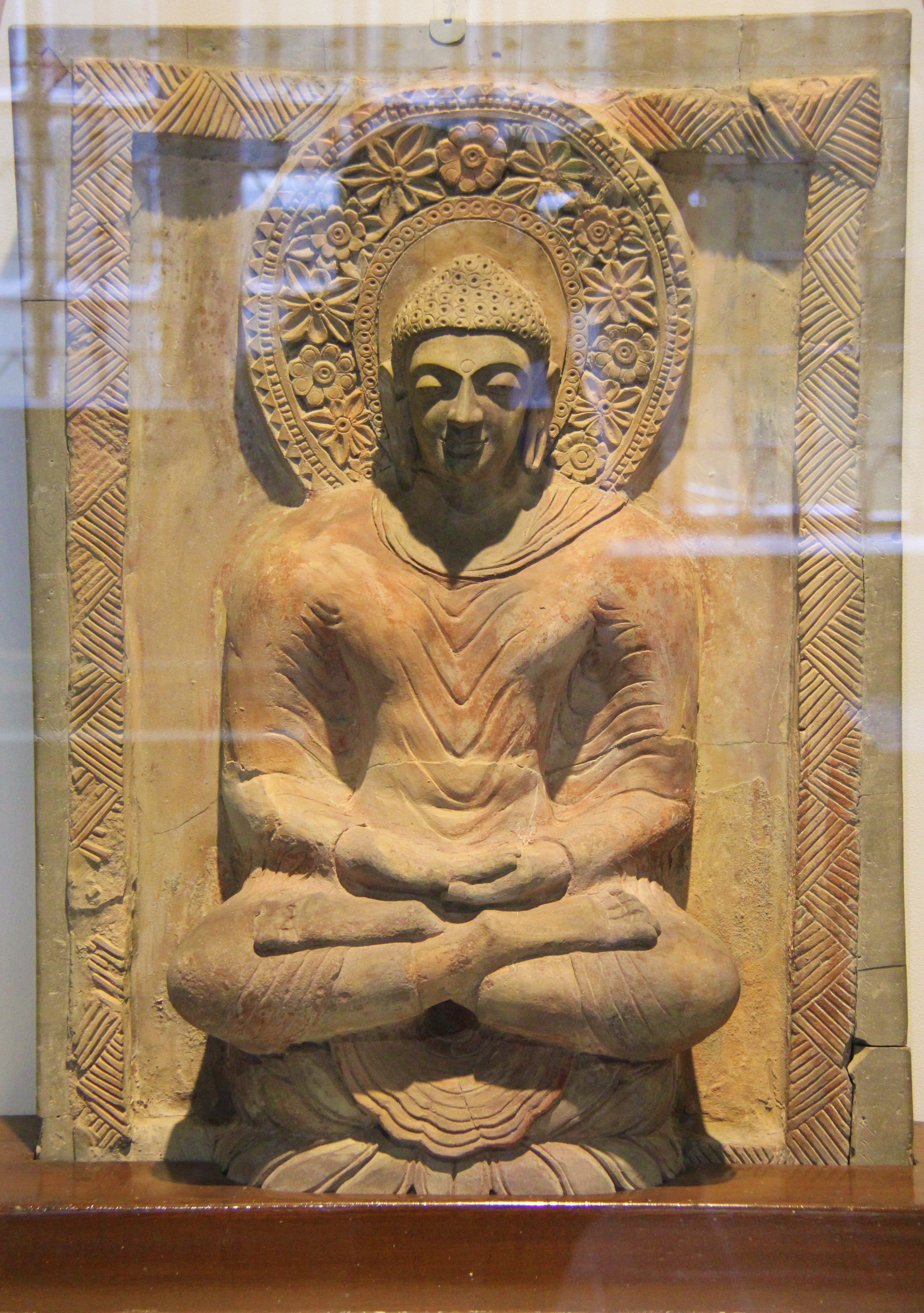
Buddha from the Kahu-jo-daro stupa, circa 410 CE.

Buddhist sites in Sindh are numerous but ill preserved in various stages of deterioration. Sites at Brahmanabad (Mansura) include a Buddhist stupa at Mohenjo-daro; Sirah-ji-takri near Rohri, Sukkur; Kahu-Jo-Daro at Mirpur Khas, Nawabshah; Sudheran-Jo-Thul near Hyderabad; Thul Mir Rukan stupa; Thul Hairo Khan Stupa; Bhaleel-Shah-Thul square stupas (5th–7th century A.D) at Dadu, and Kot-Bambhan-Thul buddhist tower near Tando Muhammad Khan. Many terracotta tiles from Kaho-Jo-Daro and Buddha statues are exhibited in Chatrapati Shivaji Museum, Mumbai.

=== Balochistan ===
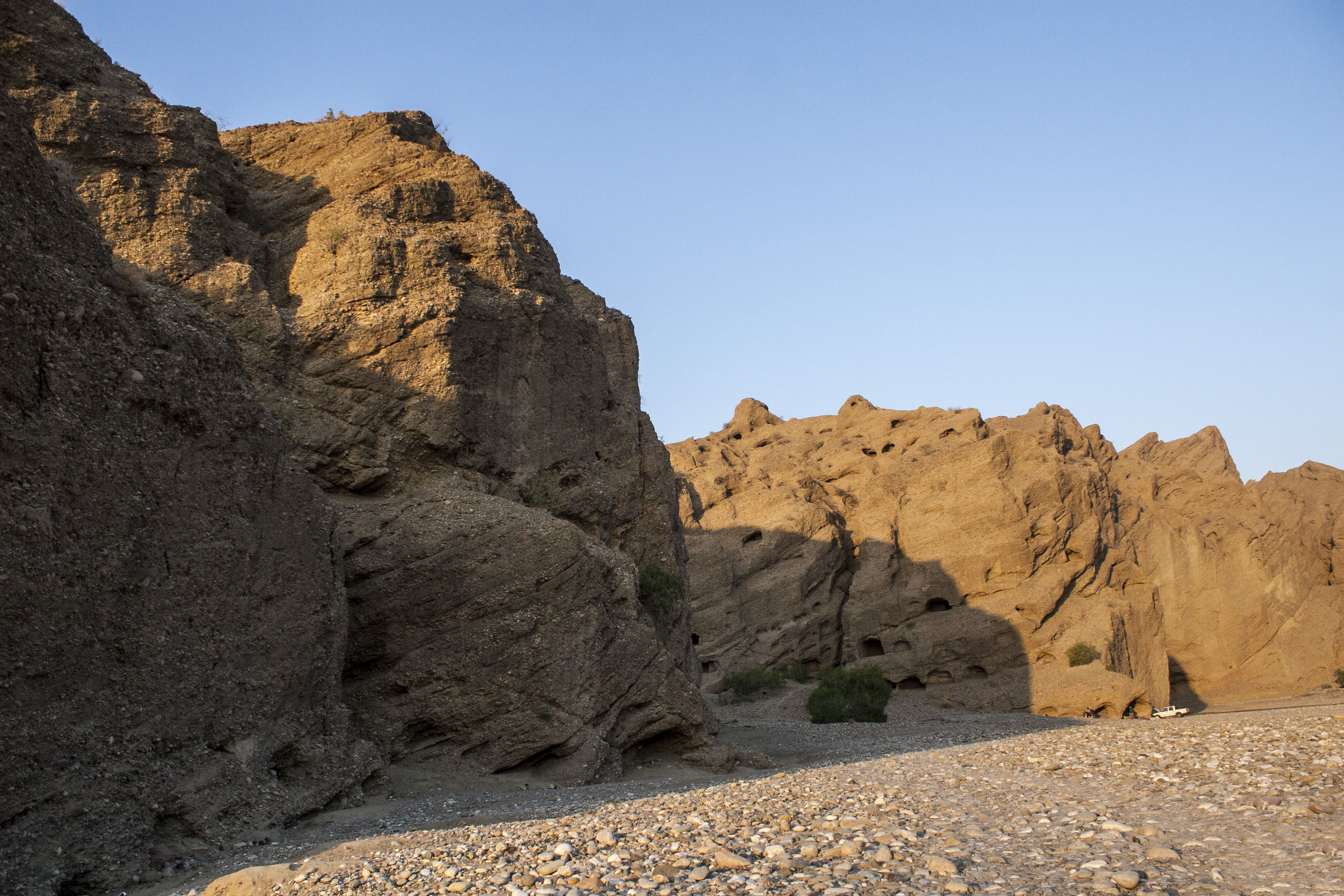
Buddhist Cave city Gondrani, Balochistan.

Chinese Buddhist traveller Hiuen Tsang reported many Buddhist temples in coastal regions of Makran, Balochistan. The remains of Buddhist cave city called Godrani caves can still be seen today.

Abū Rayḥān Muḥammad ibn Aḥmad Al-Bīrūnī states in his book Alberuni's India that the coast of India begins with Tiz, the capital of Makran.

According to historian Andre Wink:

Further evidence in the Chachnama makes perfectly clear that many areas of Makran as of Sindh had a largely Buddhist population. When Chach marched to Armabil, this town is described as having been in the hands of a Buddhist Samani (Samani Budda), a descendant of the agents of Rai Sahiras who had been elevated for their loyalty and devotion, but who later made themselves independent. The Buddhist chief offered his allegiance to Chach when the latter was on his way to Kirman in 631. The same chiefdom of Armadil is referred to by Hiuen Tsang O-tien-p-o-chi-lo, located at the high road running through Makran, and he also describes it as predominantly Buddhist, thinly populated though it was, it had no less than 80 Buddhist convents with about 5000 monks. In effect at eighteen km northwest of Las Bela at Gandakahar, near the ruins of an ancient town are the caves of Gondrani, and as their constructions show these caves were undoubtedly Buddhist. Traveling through the Kij valley further west (then under the government of Persia) Hiuen Tsang saw some 100 Buddhist monasteries and 6000 priests. He also saw several hundred Deva temples in this part of Makran, and in the town of Su-nu li-chi-shi-fa-lo - which is probably Qasrqand - he saw a temple of Maheshvara Deva, richly adorned and sculptured. There is thus very wide extension of Indian cultural forms in Makran in the seventh century, even in the period when it fell under Persian sovereignty. By comparison in more recent times the last place of Hindu pilgrimage in Makran was Hinglaj, 256 km west of present-day Karachi in Las Bela.

Wink has recorded Hiuen Tsang's notings on the language and script in use in easternmost Makran (eastern parts of Pakistani Balochistan and Sindh):

Hiuen Tsang considered the script which was in use in Makran to be 'much the same as India', but the spoken language 'differed a little from that of India.'

=== Gilgit Baltistan ===
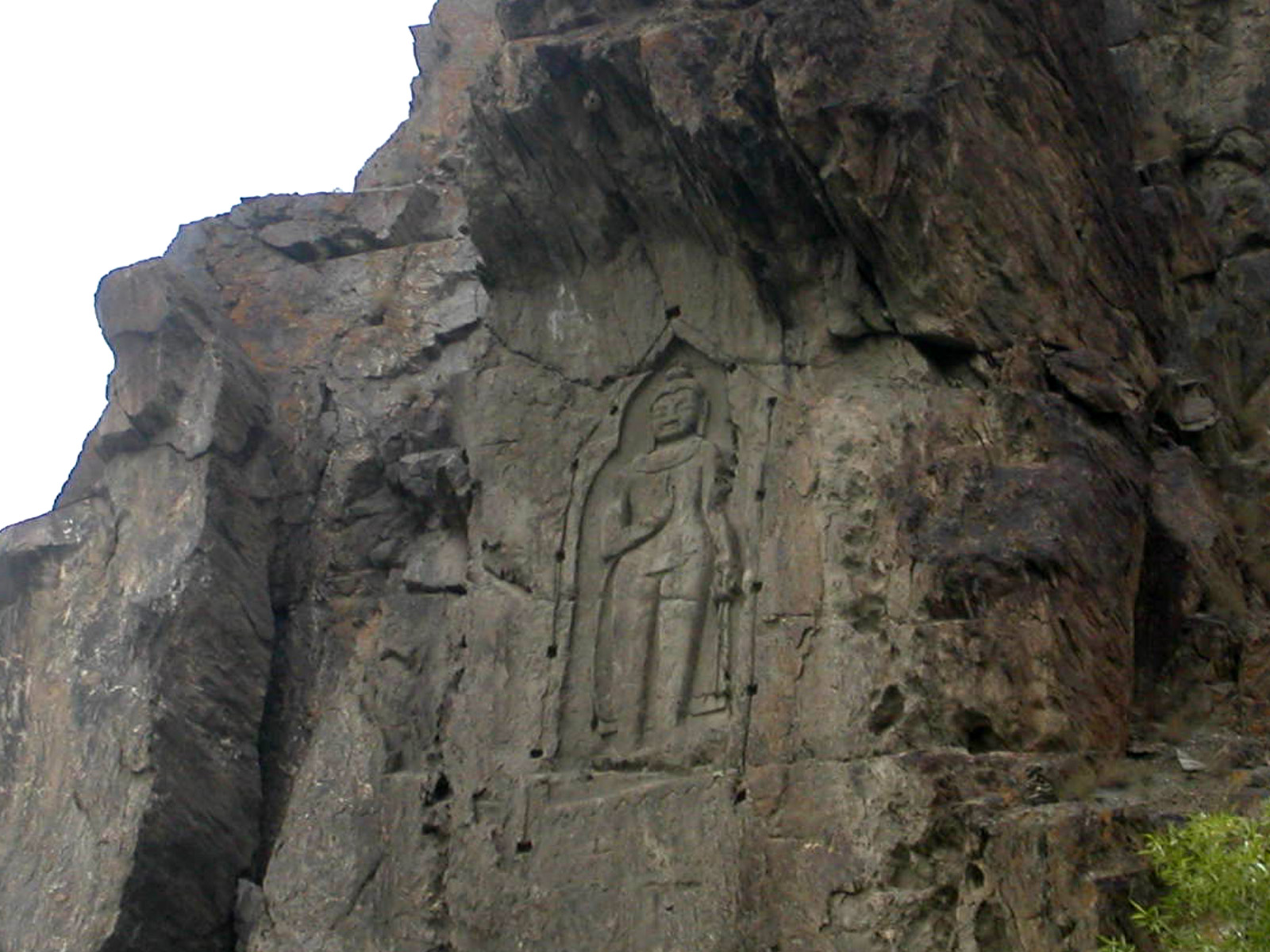
Photograph of Kargah Buddha in Gilgit; "The ancient Stupa – rock carvings of Buddha, everywhere in the region, point to the firm hold of Buddhism for such a long time."

The region has a number of surviving Buddhist archaeological sites, including the Manthal Buddha Rock—a rock relief of the Buddha at the edge of the village (near Skardu)—and the Sacred Rock of Hunza. Nearby are former sites of Buddhist shelters.

== Demographics ==
The presence of Pakistani Buddhists in modern Pakistan is unclear, although a few Pakistanis have reported themselves as Buddhist. A report mentions that they are only found in the Azad Kashmir region. The Nurbakhshi sect is said to retain some elements of Buddhism.

According to the National Database and Registration Authority (NADRA), there were 1,492 buddhists in holding national identity cards (CNICs) in 2012. In 2017, it increased to 1,884 holders. They are mostly concentrated in Sindh and Punjab regions. According to a report, most of the Baori Buddhists do not have CNIC cards, and the actual Buddhist population could exceed 16,000.

In Sindh and Southern Punjab, there is a community of Buddhists called Baori Buddhists that live primarily in the outskirts of the Mandi Yazman and Rahimyar Khan of Rohi region. Today, they have around 15 colonies in various villages of Mandi Yazman. They used to be nomadic and may have connections to the Roma people

== Pakistan Buddhist tourism ==
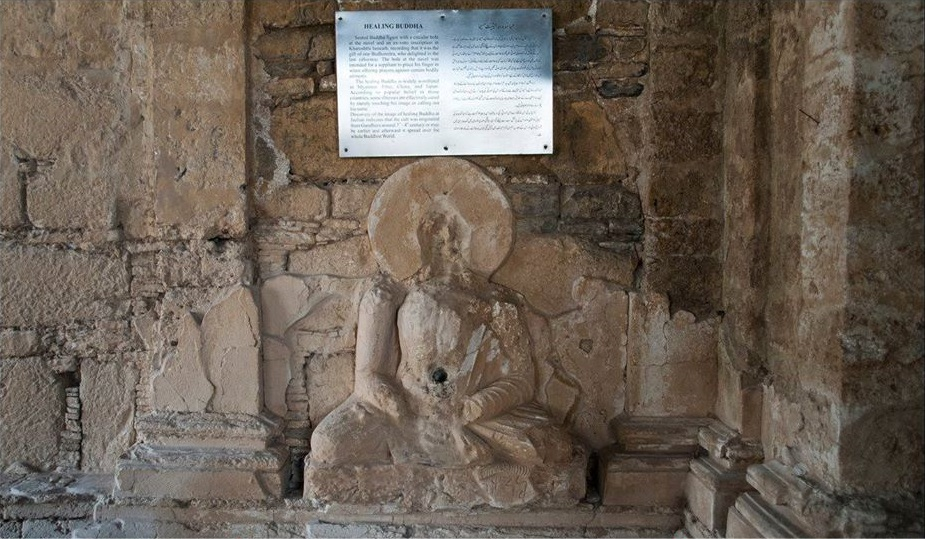
A statue of Buddha (at Jaulian, Taxila) with a hole in the navel is an odd artifact. It is called the "Healing Buddha". Buddhist pilgrims put their fingers in the navel hole and pray for the ailment of the patients.

In March 2013, a group of around 20 Buddhist monks from South Korea made the journey to the monastery of Takht-i-Bahi, 170 kilometers (106 miles) from Islamabad. The monks defied appeals from Seoul to abandon their trip for safety reasons, and were guarded by Pakistani security forces on their visit to the monastery, built of ochre-colored stone and nestled on a mountainside. From around 1,000 years BCE until the 7th century CE, northern Pakistan and parts of modern Afghanistan formed the Gandhara kingdom, where Greek and Buddhist customs mixed to create what became the Mahayana strand of the religion. The monk Marananta set out from what is now northwest Pakistan to cross China and spread Buddhism in the Korean peninsula during the 4th century. The authorities are even planning package tours for visitors from China, Japan, Singapore and South Korea, including trips to the Buddhist sites at Takht-e-Bahi, Swat, Peshawar and Taxila, near Islamabad.

== Historical figures ==
Some Buddhist historical figures who have been speculated to come from present-day Pakistan include:

- Khema from Sagala and wife of Bimbisara of Magadha, 6th century B.C.E
- Bhadda Kapilani from Sialkot, 6th century B.C.E
- Kumaralata from Taxila, 3rd century C.E
- Asanga from Peshawar, 4th-century C.E.
- Vasubandhu from Peshawar, 4th to 5th century CE
- Tridev Roy, Pakistani Buddhist politician and leader

== Gallery ==
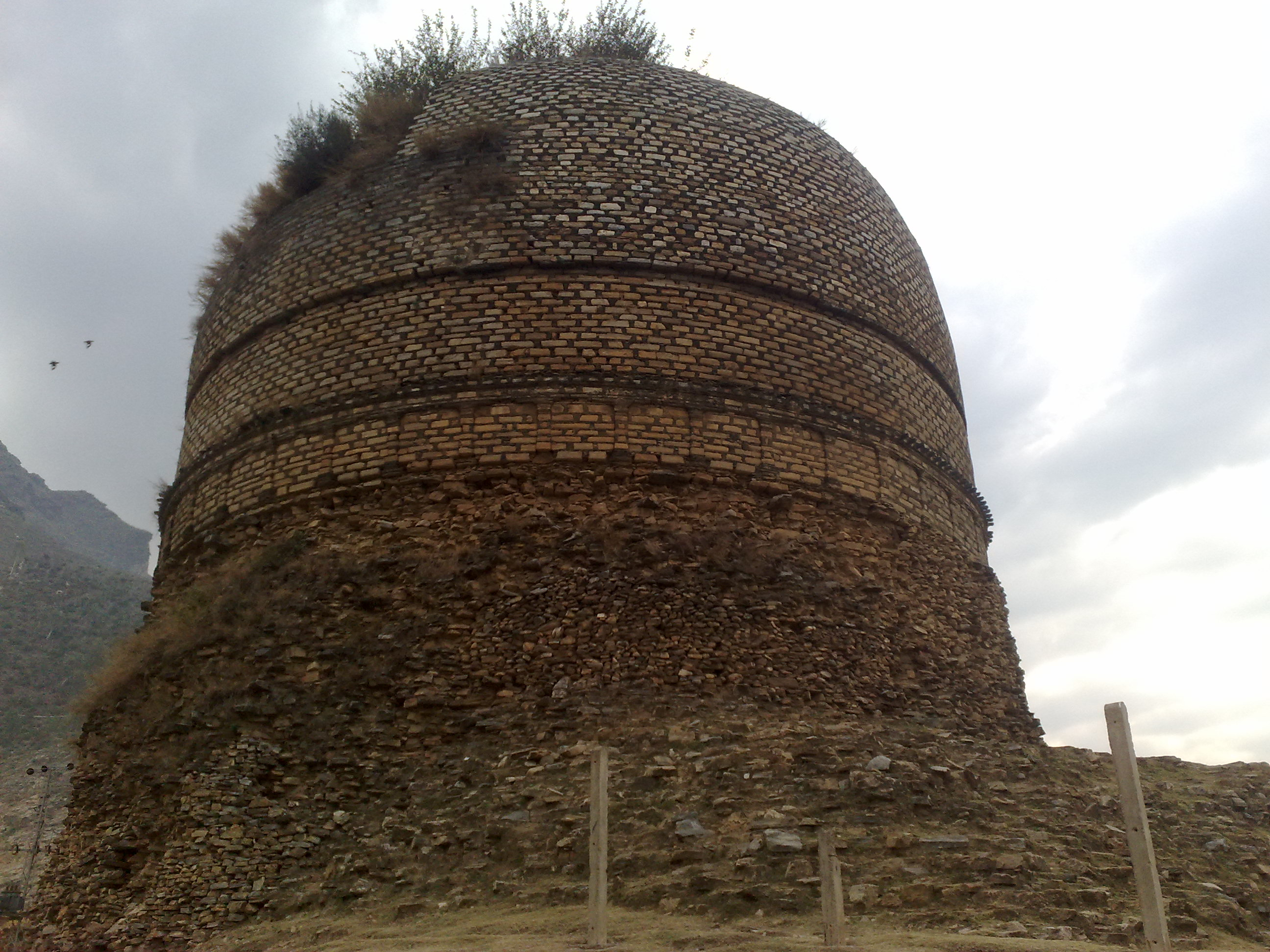
Shingardar stupa in Ghalegay

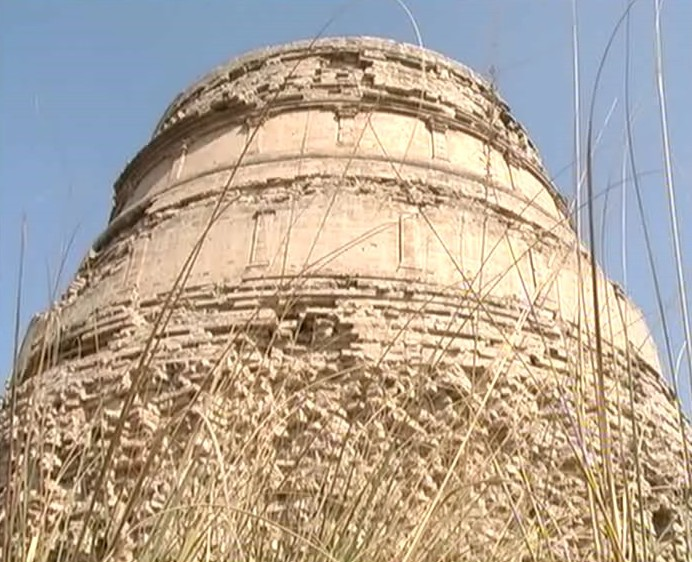
Thul Mir Rukan stupa in Sindh

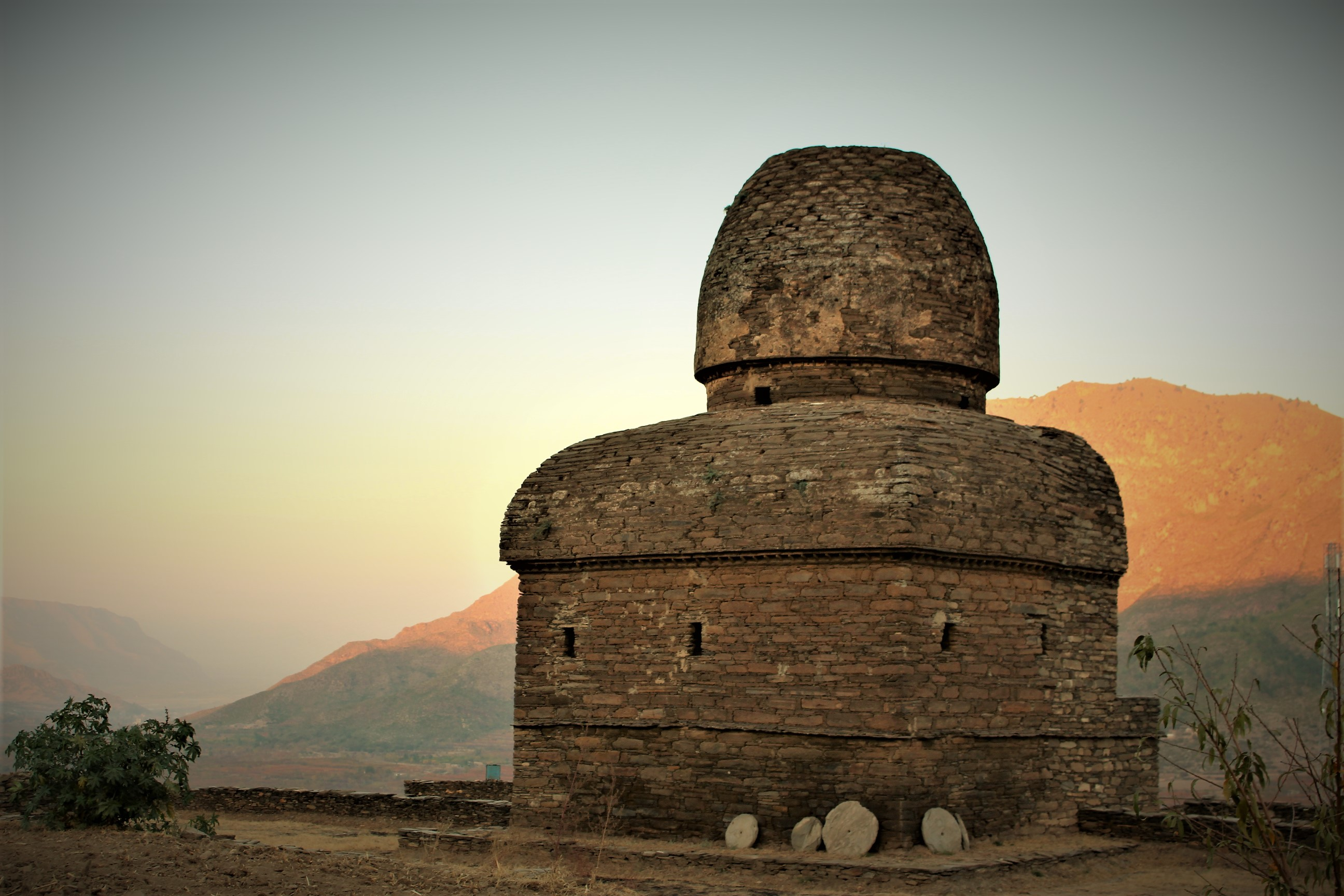
Gumbatona stupa, Swat, KPK, a rare example true domed stupa 1st or 2nd century AD

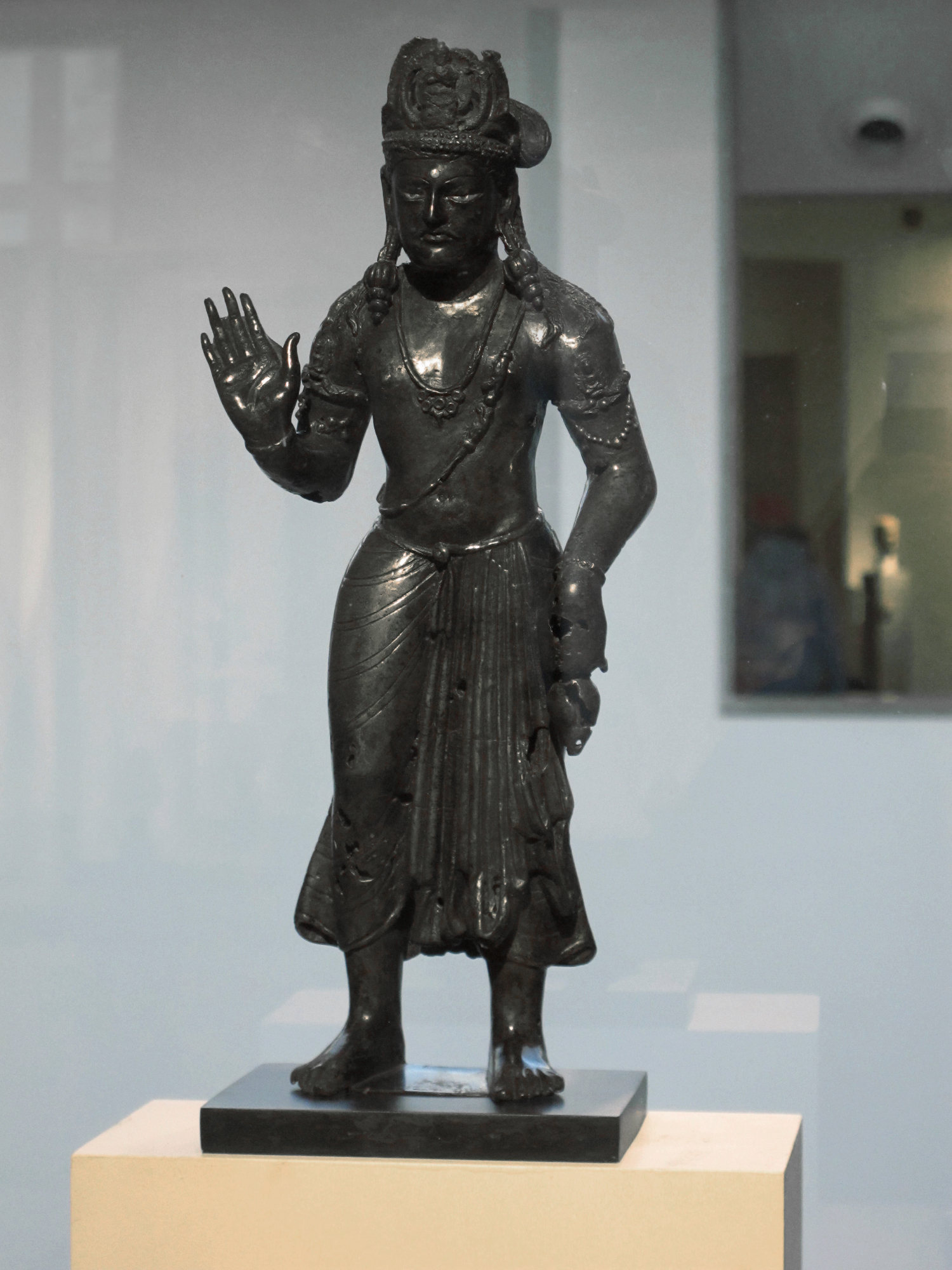
Bronze statue of Avalokiteśvara Bodhisattva from Gandhara. 3rd–4th century.

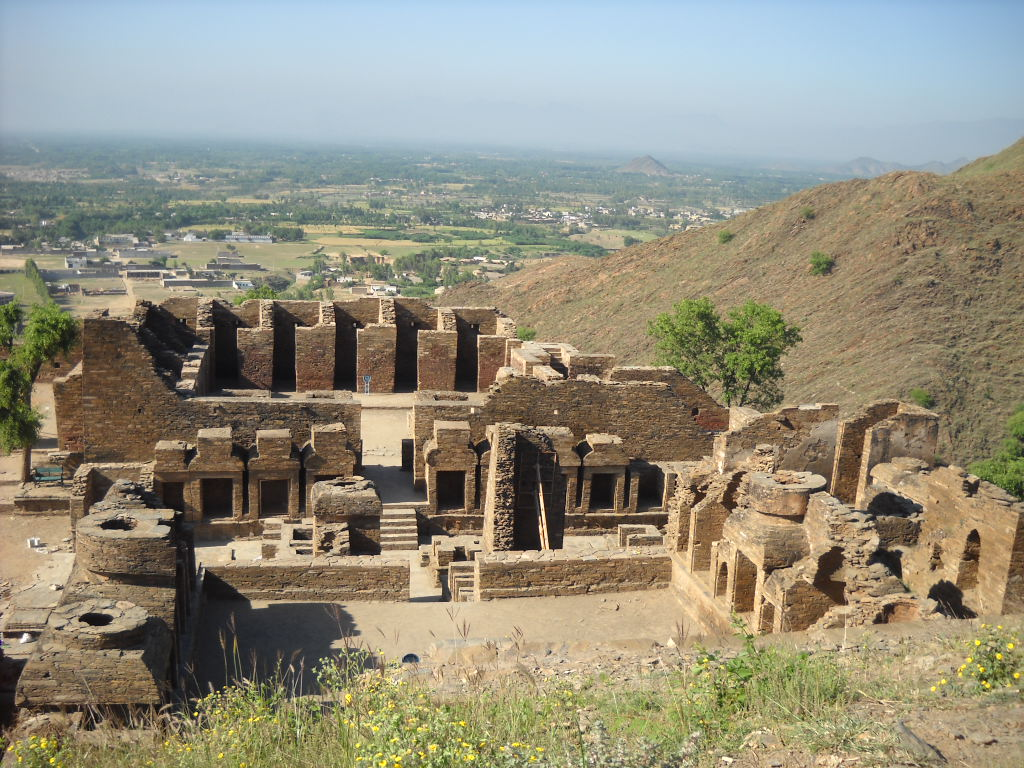
Takht-i-Bahi

== See also ==
- History of Buddhism
- Gandharan Buddhism
- Hindu and Buddhist architectural heritage of Pakistan
- History of Pakistan
- Mansehra Rock Edicts
- Silk Road transmission of Buddhism
- Decline of Buddhism in the Indian subcontinent
- Index: Buddhism by country
