= Sindhu-Sauvīra =

Ancient people in the western South Asia

- c. 1000 BCE–c. 518 BCE
- The Sindhu-Sauvīra kingdom and the Mahājanapadas in the Post Vedic period
- Capital: Roruka or Vītabhaya/Vītībhaya
- Common languages: Prakrits
- Religion: Jainism and Historical Vedic Religion
- Government: Monarchy
- Historical era: Iron Age India
  - Established: c. 1000 BCE
  - Conquered by the Achaemenid Empire: c. 518 BCE
Succeeded by
Hi^{n}dūš (Achaemenid Empire)
- Today part of: Pakistan

Sindhu-Sauvīra (Sanskrit: Sindhu-Sauvīra; Pāli: Sindhu-Sovīra) was an Iron Age Indo-Aryan kingdom of the lower Indus Valley in western South Asia.

== Location ==
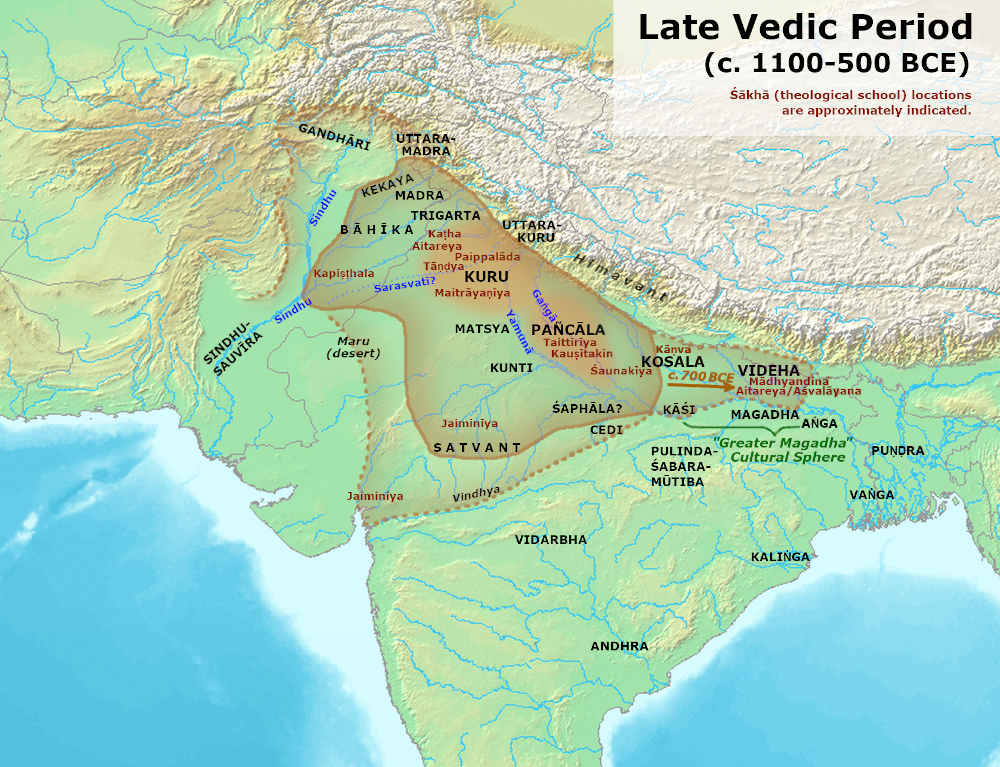
Location of Sindhu-Sauvīra during the late Vedic period

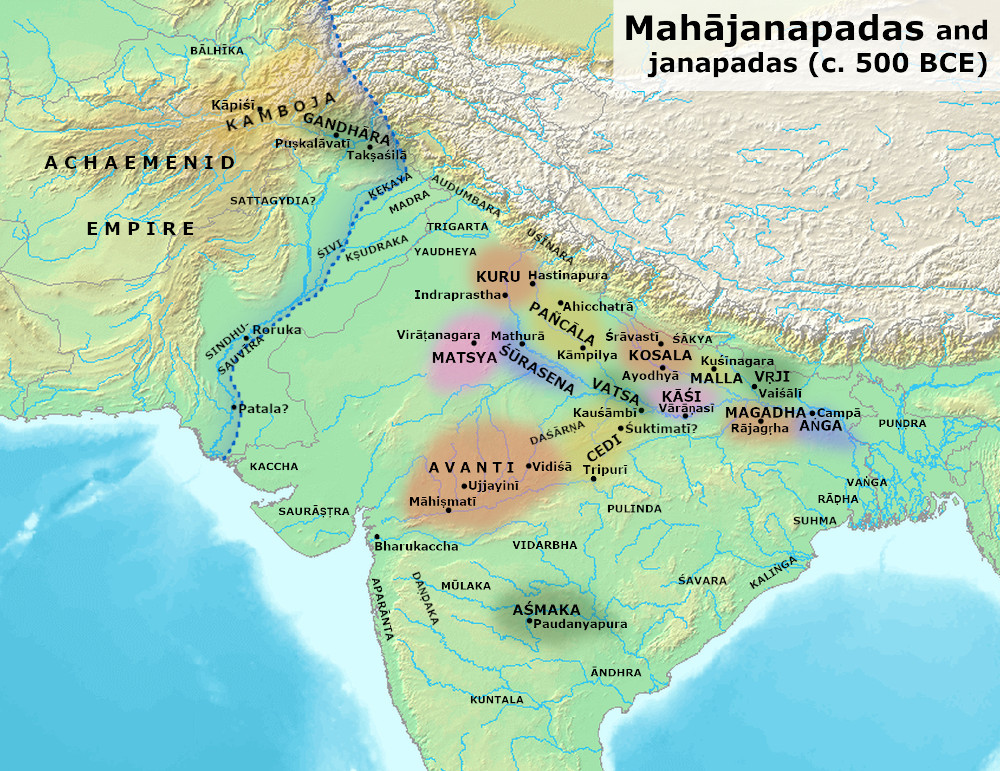
Location of Sindhu-Sauvīra with respect to the Mahājanapadas and within the Achaemenid Empire

The territory of Sindhu-Sauvīra covered the lower Indus Valley, with its southern border being the Indian Ocean and its northern border being the Punjab around Multān.

Sindhu was the name of the inland area between the Indus River and the Sulaiman Mountains, while Sauvīra was the name for the coastal part of the kingdom as well as the inland area to the east of the Indus river as far north as the area of modern-day Multan.

The capital of Sindhu-Sauvīra was named Roruka and Vītabhaya or Vītībhaya, and corresponds to the mediaeval Arohṛ and the modern-day Rohṛī. Roruka is mentioned in the Buddhist literature as a major trading center.

== History ==
Sindhu-Sauvira finds mention in Late Vedic, early Buddhist and early Jain literature.

=== Kingdom ===
During the 6th to 5th centuries BCE, the Sindhu-Sauvīra was ruled by a powerful king named Udāyana or Udrāyaṇa or Rudrāyaṇa by various sources. Udāyana was married to the princess Prabhāvatī, who was the daughter of Ceṭaka, the consul of the powerful Vajjika League in north-east South Asia, and was herself thus the cousin of the 24th Jain Tīrthaṅkara Mahāvīra, himself the son of Chetaka's sister Triśalā. Ceṭaka had become an adept of the teachings of his nephew Mahāvīra and adopted Jainism, thus making the Licchavika and Vajjika capital of Vesālī a bastion of Jainism, and the marriages of his daughters to various leaders, in turn, contributed to the spreading of Jainism across northern South Asia.

Therefore, according to Jain sources, Udāyana converted to Jainism after hearing Mahāvīra preach at Vītabhya, and he abdicated his throne and became a Jain monk after installing his nephew by his sister, Keśīkumāra, as king of Sindhu-Sauvira, instead of his own son, Abhijitkumāra, who found asylum at the court of Kūṇika, the governor of the Āṅgeya city of Campā for the count of the king of Magadha. However, Buddhist sources instead claim that Udrāyaṇa embraced Buddhism and was ordained by the Buddha.

=== Persian conquest ===
In 518 BCE, Sindhu-Sauvīra was conquered by the Persian Achaemenid Empire under Darius I, after which it was organised into the satrapy (province) of Hi^{n}dūš.

=== Later history ===
Roruka was probably the capital of the king Mousikanos, who was encountered by Alexander the Great while sailing down the Indus in 326 BCE.

The Sauvīra people or country were mentioned in the Junâgaḍh inscription of Rudradáman (150 CE).

Buddhist sites in Sindh are numerous, including a stupa at Brahmanabad; Sirah-ji-takri near Rohri, Sukkur; Kahu-Jo-Daro at Mirpur Khas, Nawabshah; Sudheran-Jo-Thul near Hyderabad; Thul Mir Rukan stupa; Thul Hairo Khan Stupa; Bhaleel-Shah-Thul square stupas (5th–7th century A.D) at Dadu, and Kot-Bambhan-Thul buddhist tower near Tando Muhammad Khan. In the 12th century king Kumarapala excavated an ancient Jivantasvami Mahavira image from the ruins of Vītabhaya-pattana, and brought it to be installed at a Jain temple in his capital city Patan.

== See also ==
- Sindhis
- History of India
- History of Pakistan
- Gandhāra (kingdom)
