= Hindu, Jain and Buddhist architectural heritage of Pakistan =

Aspect of architecture

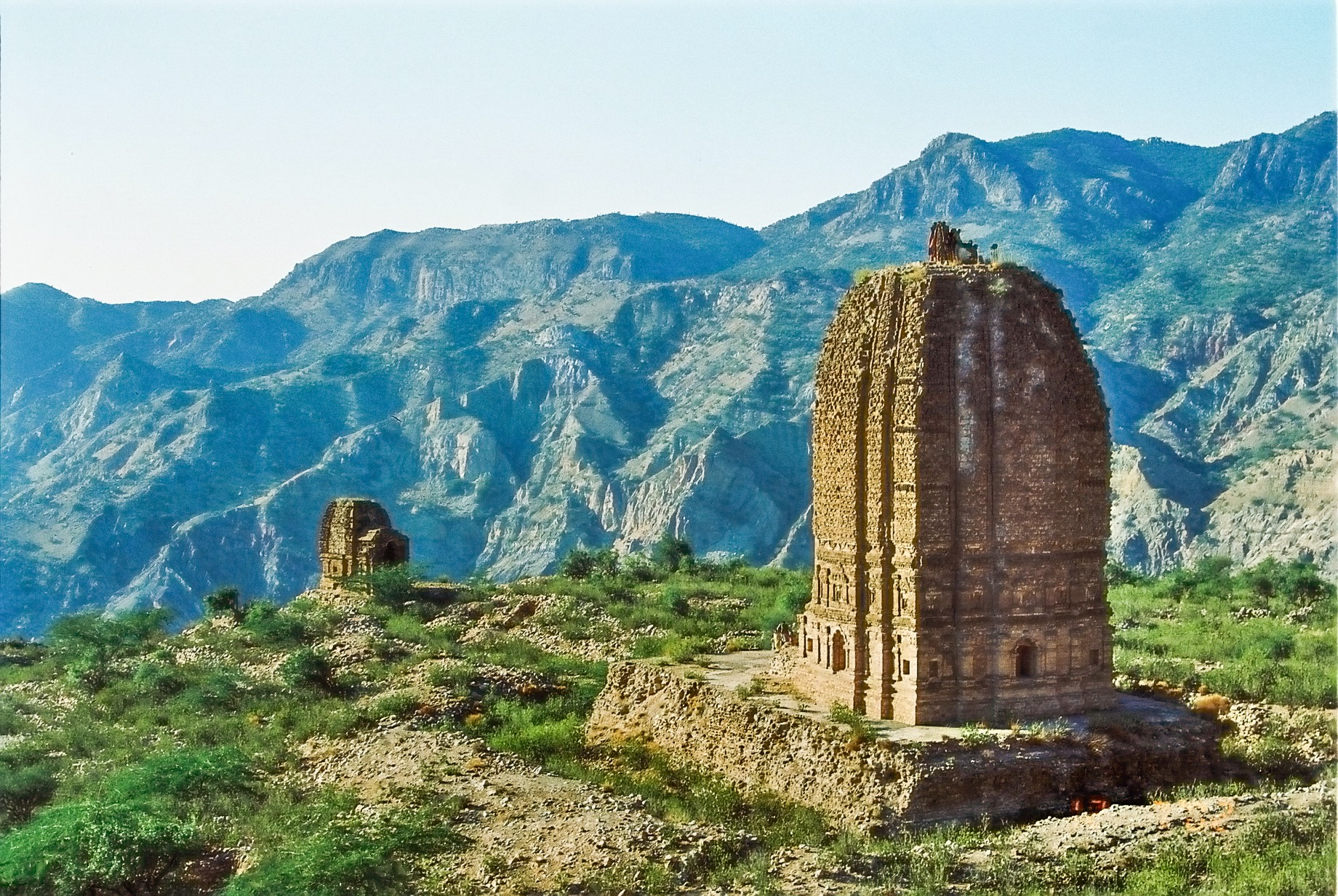
Amb temples in Khushab district

The Hindu, Buddhist and Jain architectural heritage of Pakistan is part of a long history of settlement and civilization in Pakistan. The Indus Valley civilization collapsed in the middle of the second millennium BCE and was followed by the Vedic Civilisation, which extended over much of northern India and Pakistan.

== Vedic period ==
The Vedic Period (c. 1500 – c. 500 BCE) is postulated to have formed during the 1500 BCE to 800 BCE. As Indo-Aryans migrated and settled into the Indus Valley, along with them came their distinctive religious traditions and practices which fused with local culture. The Indo-Aryans' religious beliefs and practices from the Bactria–Margiana culture and the native Harappan Indus beliefs of the former Indus Valley Civilisation eventually gave rise to Vedic culture and tribes. (Note: Archaeological cultures identified with phases of Vedic culture include the Ochre Coloured Pottery culture, the Gandhara Grave culture, the Black and red ware culture and the Painted Grey Ware culture.) The initial early Vedic culture was a tribal, pastoral society centred in the Indus Valley, of what is today Pakistan. During this period the Vedas, the oldest scriptures of Hinduism, were composed. (Note: The precise time span of the period is uncertain. Philological and linguistic evidence indicates that the Rigveda, the oldest of the Vedas, was composed roughly between 1700 and 1100 BCE, also referred to as the early Vedic period.)

Several early tribes and kingdoms arose during this period and internecine military conflicts between these various tribes was common; as described in the Rig Veda, which was being composed at this time, the most notable of such conflicts was the Battle of Ten Kings. This battle took place on the banks of the River Ravi in the 14th century BC (1300 BCE). The battle was fought between the Bharatas tribe and a confederation of ten tribes:

- Abhira kingdom, centred in the Cholistan-Thar region.
- Bahlika kingdom, centred in Punjab.
- Gandhara grave culture, also called Swat culture and centred in the Swat Valley of present-day Khyber Pakhtunkhwa.
- Kamboja kingdom, centred in the Hindu Kush region.
- Madra kingdom, centred in upper Punjab, with its capital at Sialkot
- Pauravas, a sub-clan of Kambojas
- Sindhu kingdom, centred in present-day Sindh.
- Sudra kingdom, centred in the Cholistan-Thar region.

Its early phase saw the formation of various kingdoms of ancient India. In its late phase (from c. 700 BCE), it saw the rise of the Mahajanapadas, and was succeeded by the golden age of Hinduism and classical Sanskrit literature, the Maurya Empire (from c. 320 BCE) and the Middle kingdoms of India.

== Gandhāra ==
Gandhāra is the name of an ancient region located in present-day north-west Pakistan and parts of north-east Afghanistan. The region centered around the Peshawar Valley and Swat river valley, though the cultural influence of "Greater Gandhara" extended across the Indus river to the Taxila region in Potohar Plateau and westwards into the Kabul Valley in Afghanistan, and northwards up to the Karakoram range.

Famed for its unique Gandharan style of art which is heavily influenced by the classical Greek and Hellenistic styles, Gandhara attained its height from the 1st century to the 5th century CE under the Kushan Empire, who had their capital at Peshawar (Puruṣapura). Gandhara "flourished at the crossroads of India, Central Asia, and the Middle East," connecting trade routes and absorbing cultural influences from diverse civilizations; Buddhism thrived until the 8th or 9th centuries, when Islam first began to gain sway in the region. It was also the centre of Vedic and later forms of Hinduism.

== Sites ==
=== Punjab ===
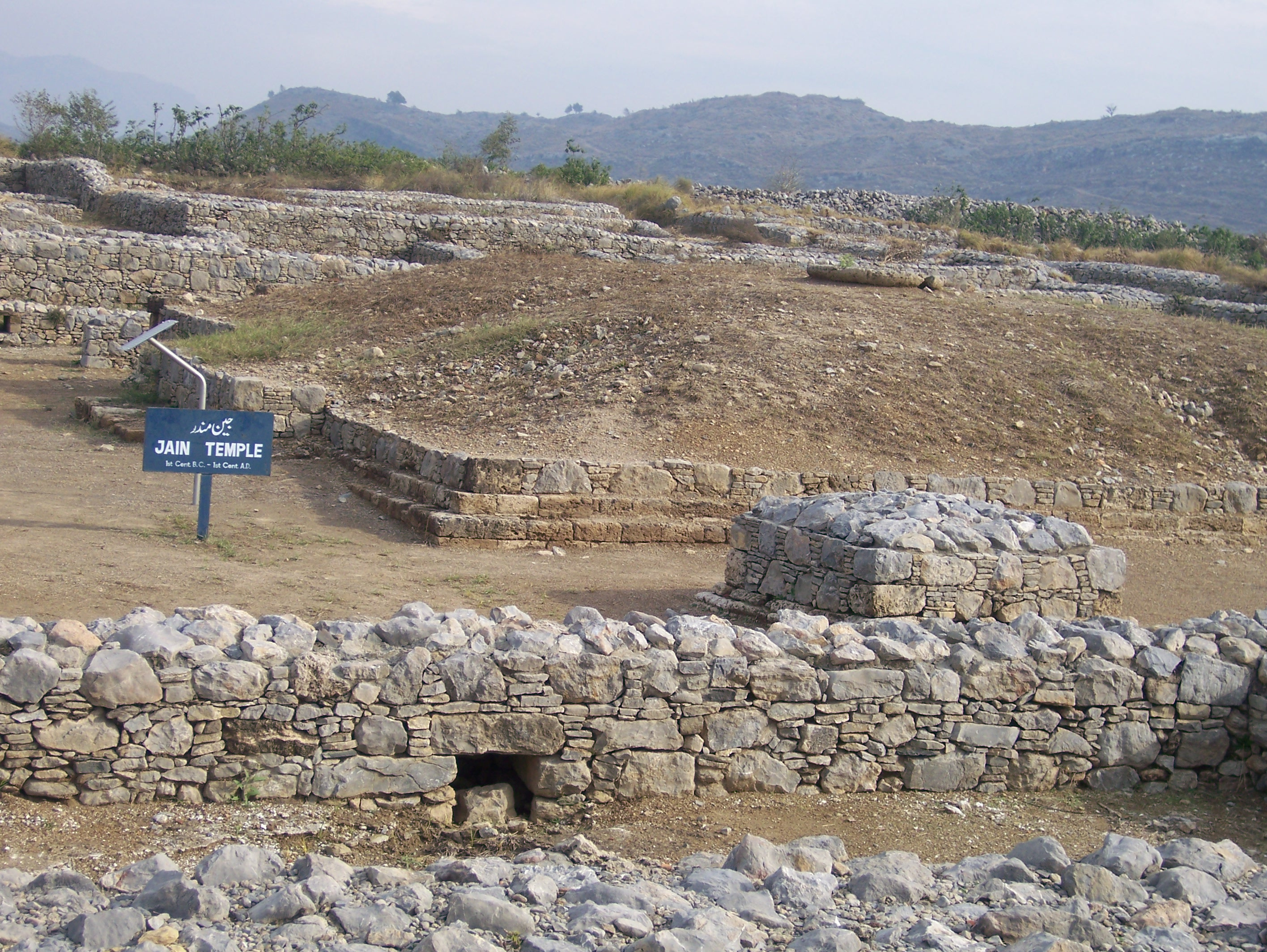
Sirkap near modern Taxila, Punjab, Pakistan (probably destroyed)

- Pothohar Plateau
- Sagala
- Sialkot
- Ganeriwala
- Tulamba
- Dipalpur
- Okara District
- Mankiala

Temples:

- Jain temple, Thari Bhabrian Lahore City.
- Jain Digambar Temple with Shikhar, Old Anarkali Jain Mandir Chawk: This temple was destroyed in the riots of 1992. Now an Islamic school is run from the former temple. 31.561389°N 74.308056°E.

=== Sindh ===
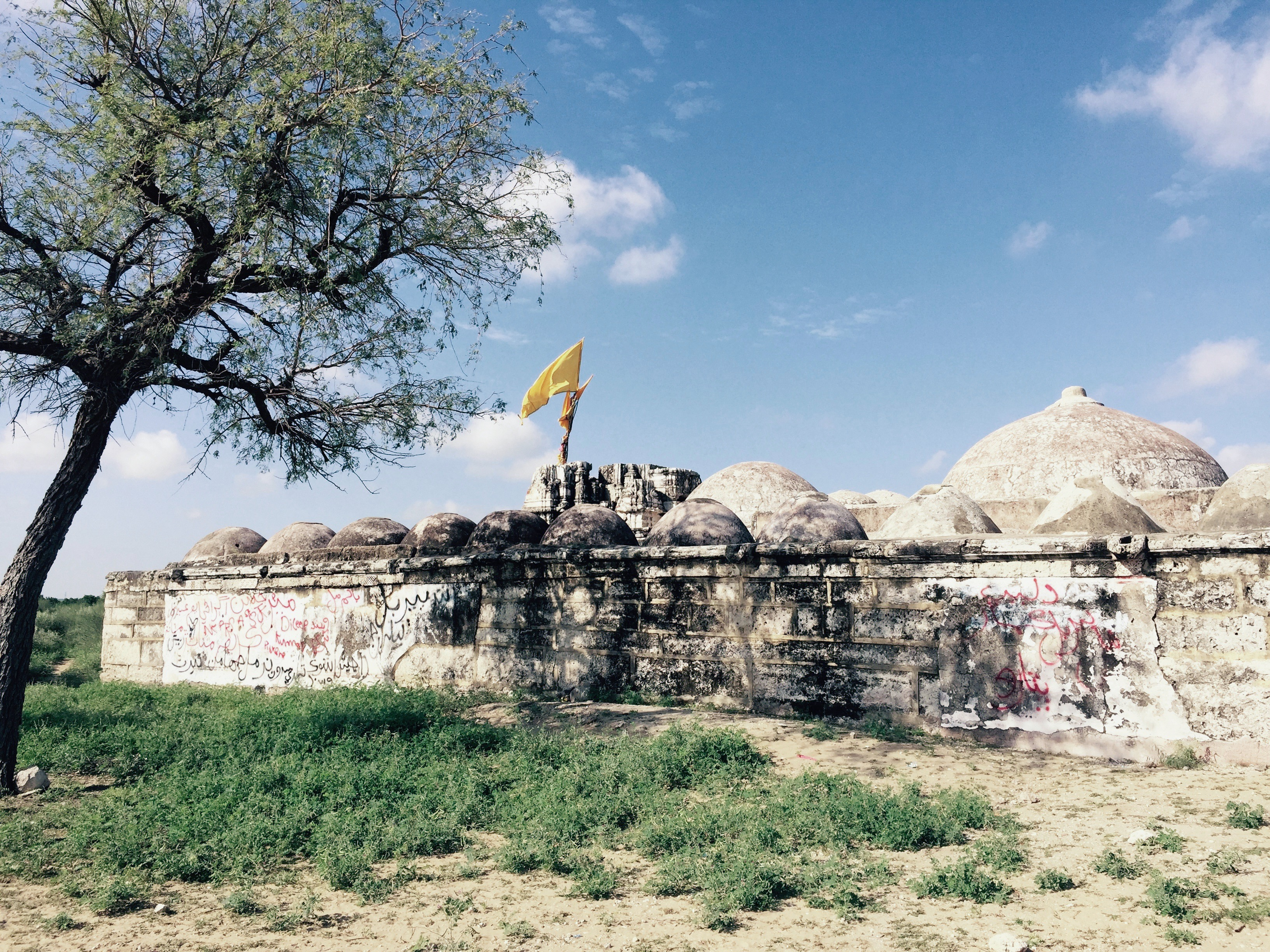
The Gori Temple with 52 domes, Nagarparkar

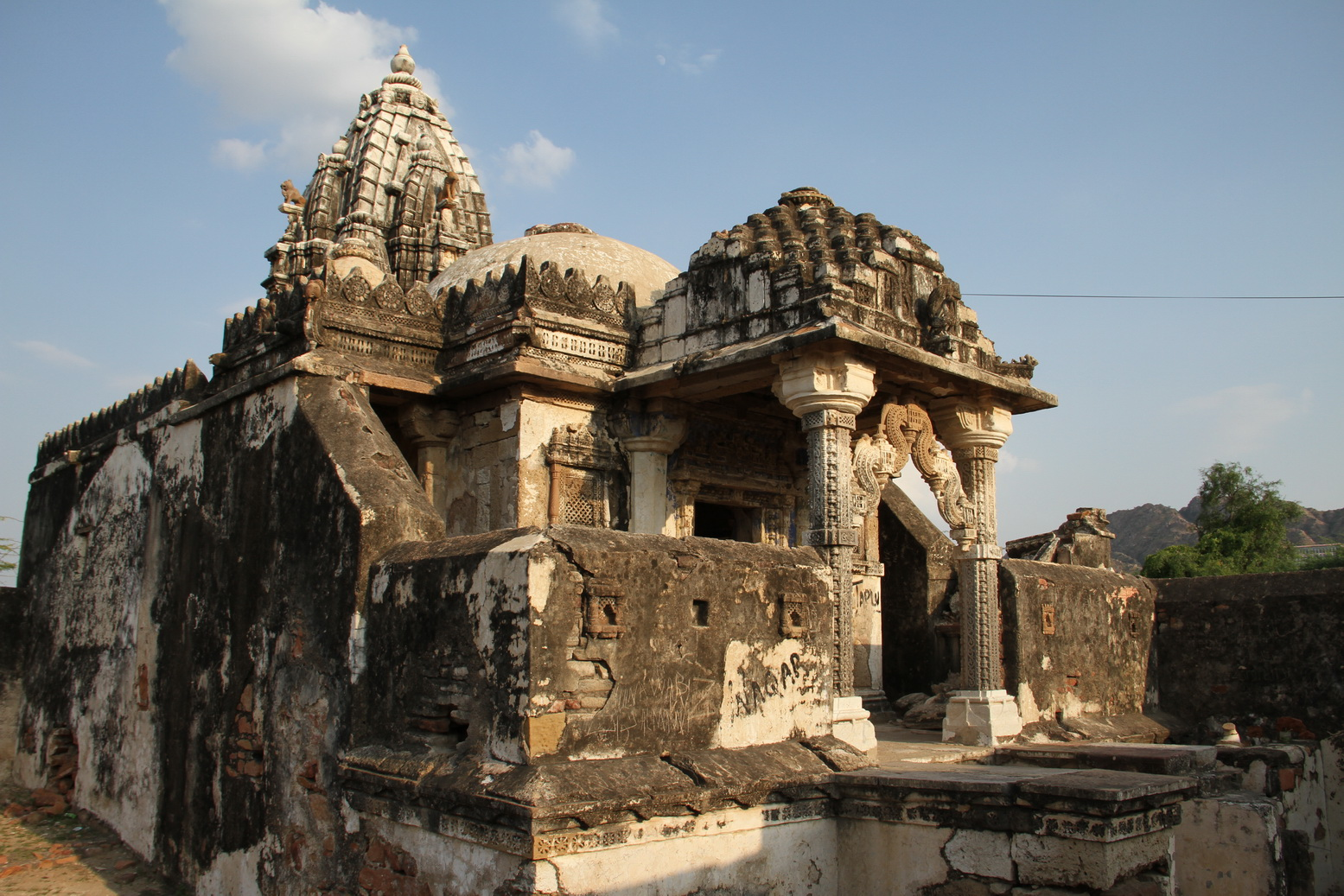
- An ancient Jain temple at Nagarparkar
  Sadh Belo Temple (near Sukkur, Sindh)
- Chanhudaro
- Siraj-ji-Takri
- Nagarparkar Jain Temples

(A Jain Stupa is also located in Sindh province.)

=== Khyber-Pakhtunkhwa ===
- Takht Bhai
- Bala Hisar Fort
- Barikot
- Udyana
- Butkara Stupa
- Chakdara
- Gandhara
- Gor Khuttree
- Kashmir Smast
- Lower Swat Valley
- Mingora
- Panchkora Valley of Dir
- Pushkalavati
- Shahbaz Garhi
- Sehri-Bahlol
- Swabi
- Panj Tirath

=== Balochistan ===
- Kot Bala
- Las Bela (princely state)
- Gondrani

== Conservation and corruption ==
In December 2017, the Chief Justice of Pakistan Mian Saqib Nisar while hearing a case on Katas Raj Temple in Chakwal stressed, "This temple is not just a place of cultural significance for the Hindu community, but also a part of our national heritage. We have to protect it." The bench of judges during the hearing of the case also expressed displeasure at the displacing of idols from the temples, demanding to know why there were no statues in the temples of Shiri Ram and Hanuman. The bench was told that a former chairman of the Evacuee Trust Property Board (ETPB) earned millions of rupees from corruption [during his tenure] and then ran away [from Pakistan].

== See also ==
- Jainism in Pakistan
- Tilla Jogian
- Rohtas Fort
- Gandhara
