= Gondrani =

Archaeological site in Balochistan, Pakistan

- Shehr-e-Roghan, Cave City of Gonrani, Cave Dwellings of Gondrani, House of the Spirits, Mai Goudrani
- Location within Pakistan
- 26°23′39″N 66°12′45″E
- Location: Bela, Balochistan, Pakistan
- Region: Balochistan

Gondrani (Urdu: گونڈرانی), also known as Shehr-e-Roghan (Urdu: شہرِ روغان), is an archaeological site near the town of Bela in Balochistan, Pakistan. Situated 20 kilometres (12 miles) to the north of the town of Bela and approximately 218 kilometres (135 miles) from Karachi, it lies within the Lasbela District. Renowned for its unique features, the site is also known by several evocative names, including the Cave City of Lasbela, the Cave Dwellings of Gondrani, the House of the Spirits, and the town of Mai Gondrani.

== History ==
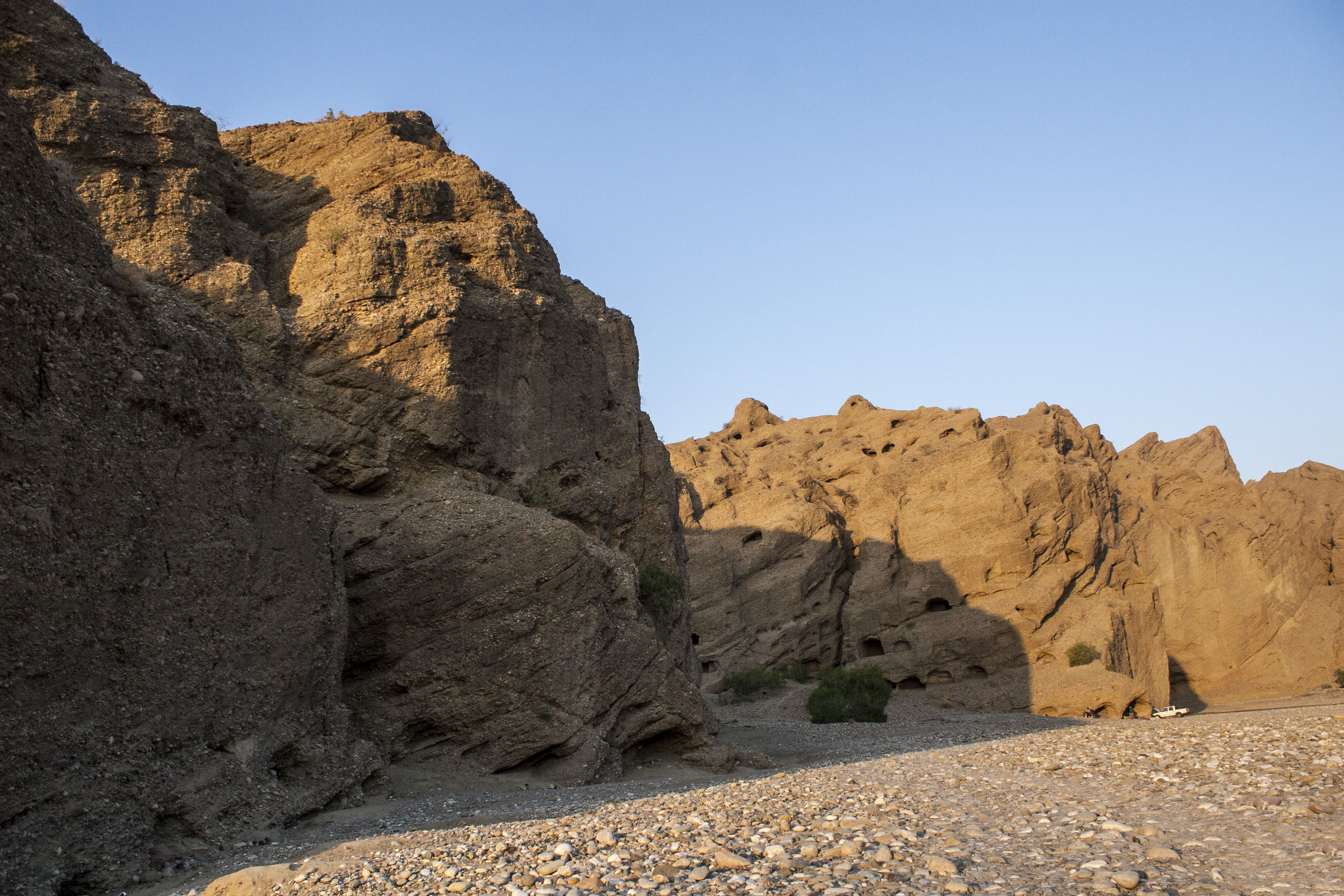
Cave City, Gondhrani

The exact history of the town is not known, nor who built the caves. Historians believe that the town was once a large Buddhist monastery dating back to the eighth century, when the region was part of a Buddhist kingdom. André Wink in his book Early Medieval India and the Expansion of Islam: 7th-11th Centuries states that:

In effect, at eighteen km north-west of Las Bela, at Gandakahar, near the ruins of an ancient town, are the caves of Gondrani, and as their construction shows these caves were undoubtedly Buddhist.

According to another source, Journal of the Society for South Asian Studies, the site cannot be conclusively linked to Buddhist heritage, though it does show Buddhist characteristics:

Although not irrefutably Buddhist, the cave complex of Gondrani, some fifteen kilometres north-west of Las Bela in Makran, does show definite Buddhist characteristics.

The Geographical Journal agrees that the caves are of Buddhist origin:

...not far from them are the Caves of Gondrani, about which there is no room for conjecture, for they are clearly Buddhist, as can be told from their construction.

== Caves of Gondrani ==
The Caves of Gondrani are locally known as Puraney Ghaar, simply translating to ‘Old house’. (Urdu: پرانا گھر),

They are carved into solid conglomerate rocks at several levels, and are connected by pathways. All the caves have small rooms with hearths and wall niches for lamps, along with verandahs or front porches.

During British rule, around 1500 caves were reported, but now only 500 remain. The caves are in poor condition and are slowly eroding. No conservation efforts have been made to protect the site due to poor accessibility and lack of knowledge of the archaeological site and no spirit from Archeological Society of Pakistan to conserve such non-islamic historical places, unless it attracts traffic.

== Legends ==
Many local legends are associated with town . According to one legend, the demons and evil spirits inhabiting the mountain would torment and feed on the flesh of the people of Gondrani. An old holy woman named Mai Gondrani sacrificed herself to kill the demons and free the town people. In another version, the pious lady exorcised the town and lived there until her death. The woman is buried nearby; her burial place is a well-known local shrine.

== See also ==
- Archaeological sites in Lasbella
