= Thul Mir Rukan =

Stupa in Sindh, Pakistan

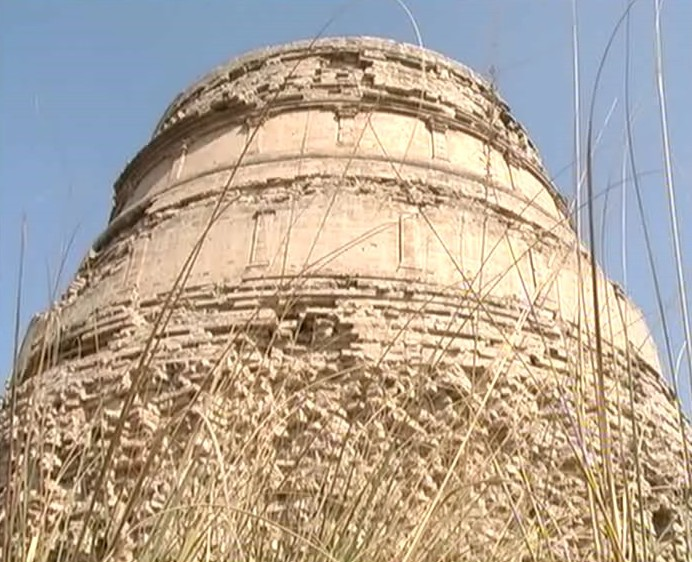
- Thul Mir Rukan

Religion
- Affiliation: Buddhism
- Region: Sindh
- Ecclesiastical or organizational status: Stupa ruins present
- Year consecrated: 600 CE-1100 CE
- Status: Artifacts Removed

Location
- Location: Pakistan
- Interactive map of Thul Mir Rukan
- Coordinates: 26°27′16.12″N 68°6′23.90″E

The Thul Mir Rukan (Urdu: ٹھل میر رکن, Sindhi: ٺلهه مير رڪڻ) is a Buddhist stupa, built possibly between the 6th to 11th century CE, it is located near the modern cities of Kazi Ahmed and Daulatpur in the Sindh province of Pakistan. This monument has domed ceiling and it is 60 feet high, constructed with baked bricks. Details indicate the site being a religious Buddhist center since antiquity. Many evidences were explored from this site are related to Gautama Buddha.
