= Sudheran-Jo-Thul =

Sudheran-Jo-Thul (Sindhi: سڌيرڻ جو ٺلھ) is a Buddhist stupa which is situated near Tando Muhammad Khan city and Badin city in Tando Muhammad Khan District, Sindh, Pakistan. It is located at the mound which shows the remains of a big ancient city. It is located towards the south of Hyderabad city. Locally, it is famous as the Tower of Sudheran. According to some accounts, this stupa is believed to be cinerary.
