= Kahu-Jo-Darro =

Mirpur Khas stupa
- Kahu-Jo-Darro
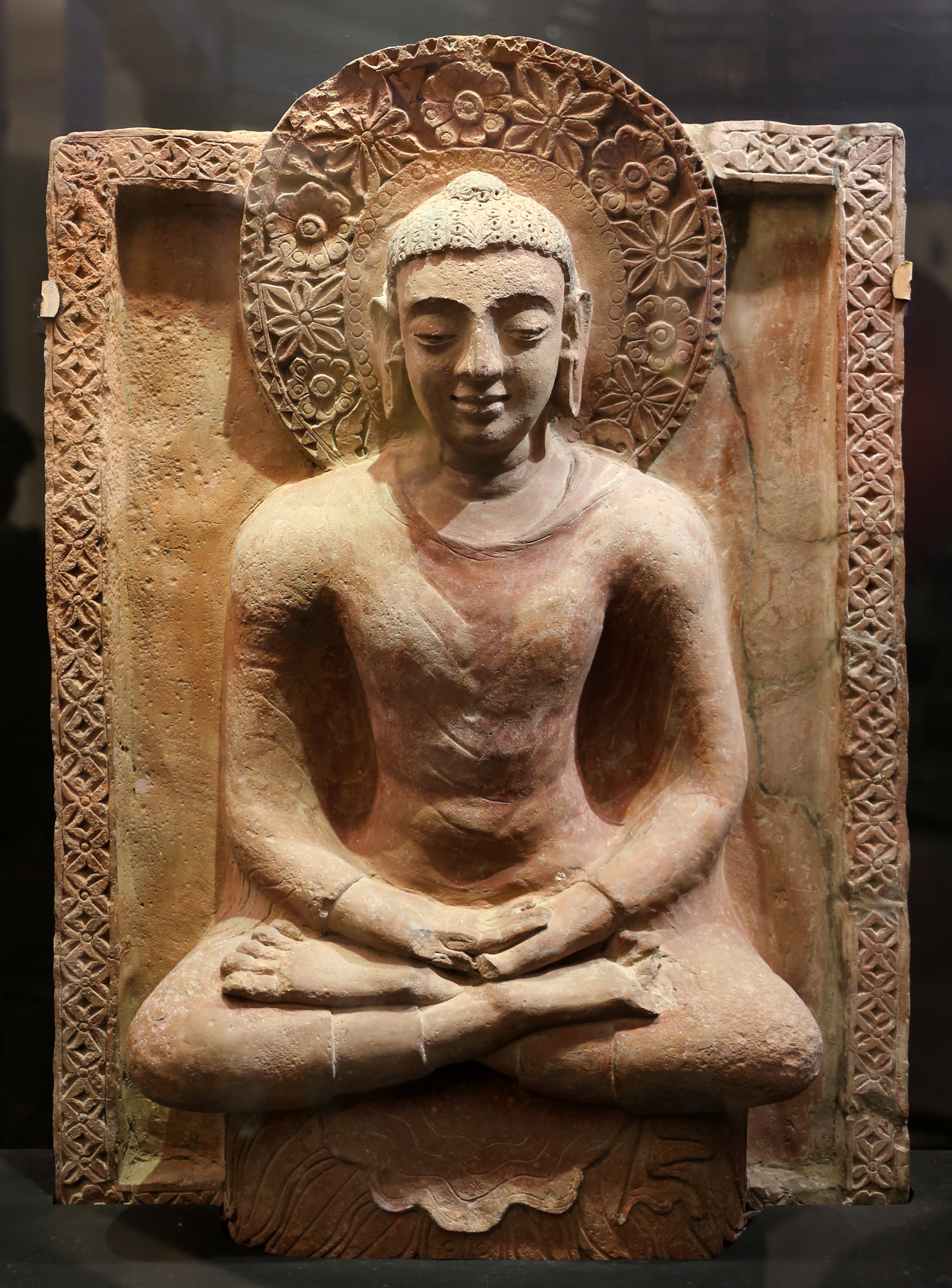
- Buddha from the Kahu-Jo-Daro stupa, circa 410 CE

- Location within South Asia Location within Pakistan Location within Sindh
- 25.545650°N 69.008640°E
- Type: Stupa
- Cultures: Western Satraps; Gupta Empire
- Location: Sindh, Pakistan

History
- Built: Early 5th century CE

Kahu-Jo-Darro, also known as Mirpur Khas stupa, is an ancient Buddhist stupa found at the Mirpurkhas archaeological site in Sindh, Pakistan. The site is spread over 30 acres (120,000 m^{2}). Excavations completed before 1910 revealed this large brick-based stupa and numerous terracotta reliefs now displayed in major world museums. The Mirpur Khas site is notable because historic Indian and Arab coins were found during its excavation. This has led scholars such as Derryl MacLean to suggest that Buddhism was thriving in Sindh region around the 10th-century and became extinct in these parts of the west and northwest South Asia after the Islamic conquest.

Early estimates placed the site in the 4th to 5th-century. The stupa is now dated between the 5th to early 6th-century, because its artwork is more complex and resembles those found in the dated sites such as the Ajanta and Bhitargaon in India. The terracotta discoveries here include intricately and elegantly carved Buddha images as well as several Hindu artworks such as of Brahma. These different terracotta artwork found here have been variously dated between the 6th to 10th centuries, and include the notable 7th-century painted image of Avalokitesvara Padmapani. The artwork is similar to those seen at Sarnath and at Mathura. Clay tablets containing the Buddhist formula "Ye Dharma Hetu" in 7th-8th century script were also found.

General John Jacob, the acting British Commissioner in Sindh, was the first official to be attracted to the site in the 19th century. His excavations found a vase of fine earthenware containing some pieces of crystal and amethyst, which was sent to the Karachi Museum. The stupa was decorated using terracotta sculptures representing the Buddha.

According to Henry Cousens, the Kahu-Jo-Daro site was significantly damaged when railway contractors in colonial-era Sindh carted off large quantities of the ancient bricks to use them as track ballast. The Kahu-Jo-Daro site was occupied by local villagers through the early 2000s, when the Pakistani government relocated the residents out of the complex to another site. The stupa's condition has further deteriorated, as the practice of stealing the bricks for local construction has furthered the destruction.

The Prince of Wales Museum describes the style of the Mirpur Khas stupa as a conflation of the Greco-Buddhist art of Gandhara, and Gupta art:

"The terracotta figures of Mirpur Khas represent the Gupta idiom as it flourished in Sindh. (...) In the terracottas of Mirpur Khas, of which the Museum has a most representative collection, one may see the synthesis of Gandhara and Gupta traditions . Here the old sacrosanct forms of Gandhara are moulded in the Gupta character of nobility, restraint and spirituality and the result is very pleasing. The figures of the Buddha from Mirpur Khas show transformation from the Gandhara to Gupta idiom, which the figures of the donor and Kubera show well developed Gupta types."

— Prince of Wales Museum of Western India

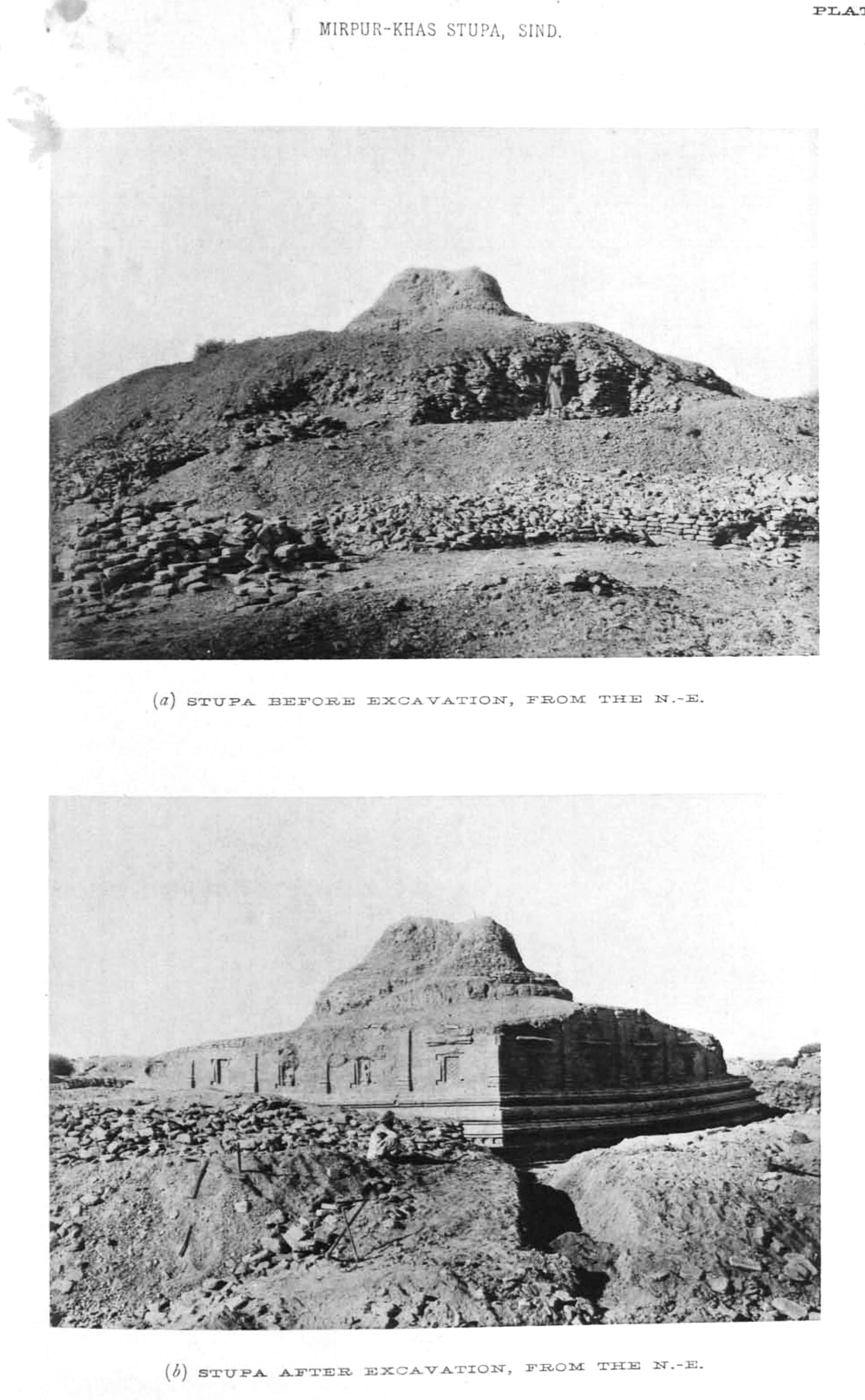
The Stupa, before and after excavation

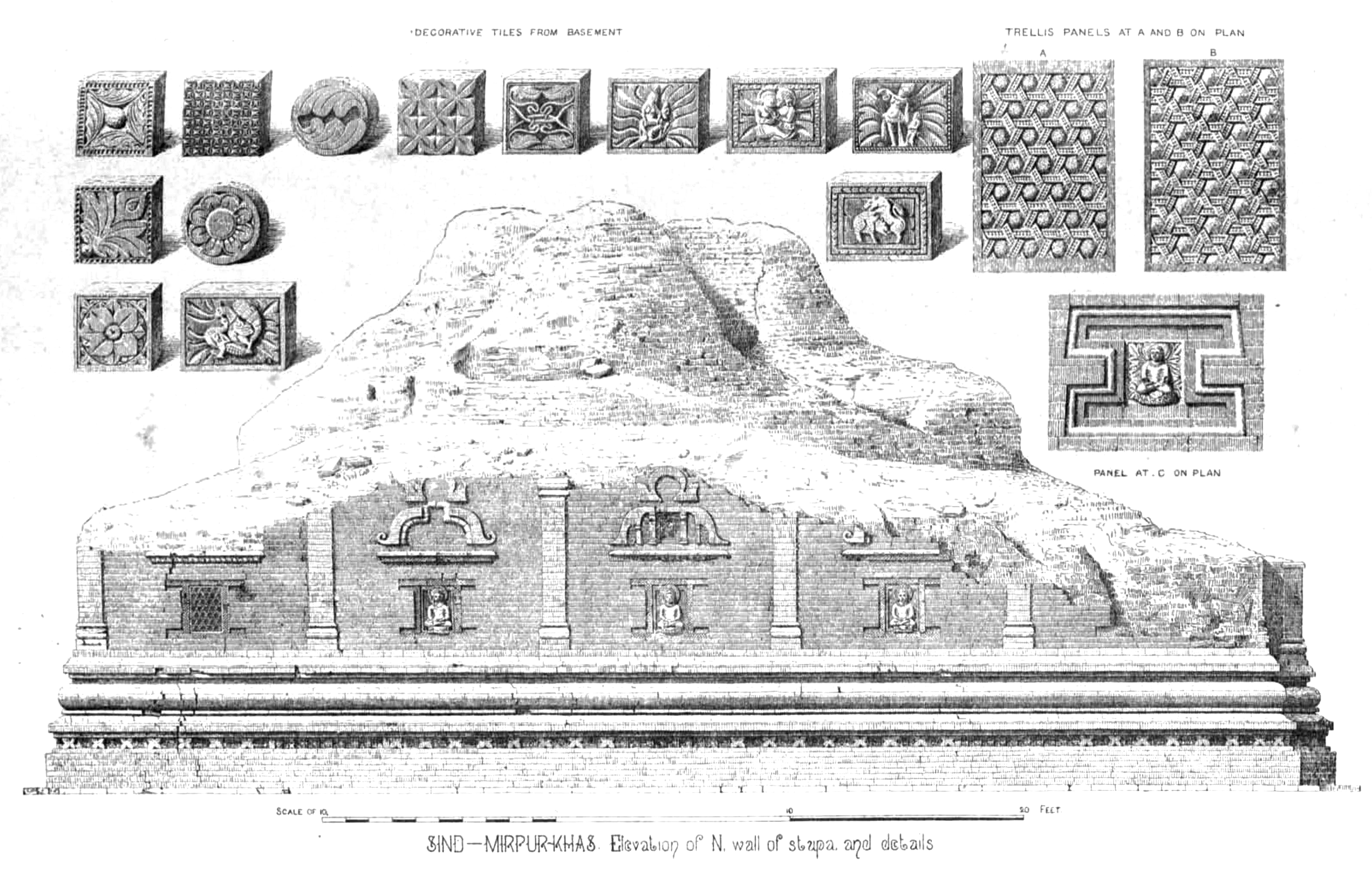
Buddhist stupa of Mirpur Khas

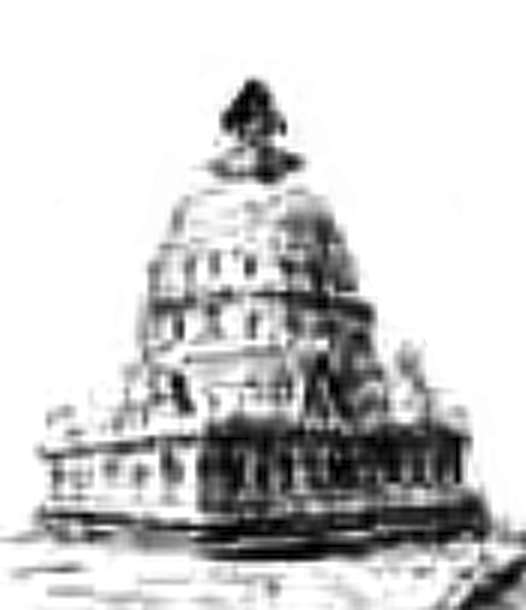
Buddhist stupa of Mirpur Khas (artist's reconstruction)

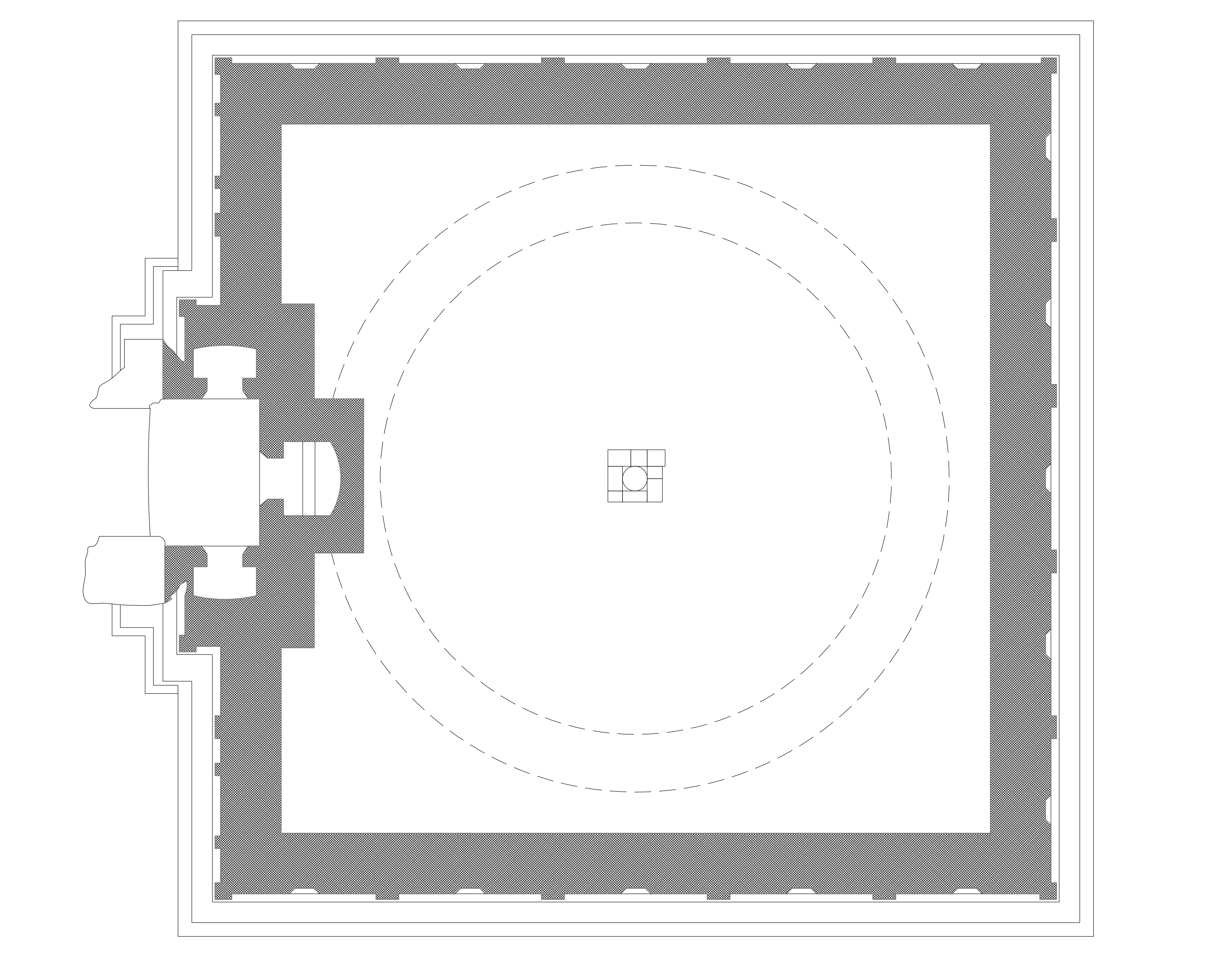
Floor plan of the Buddhist Stupa, Mirpur Khas

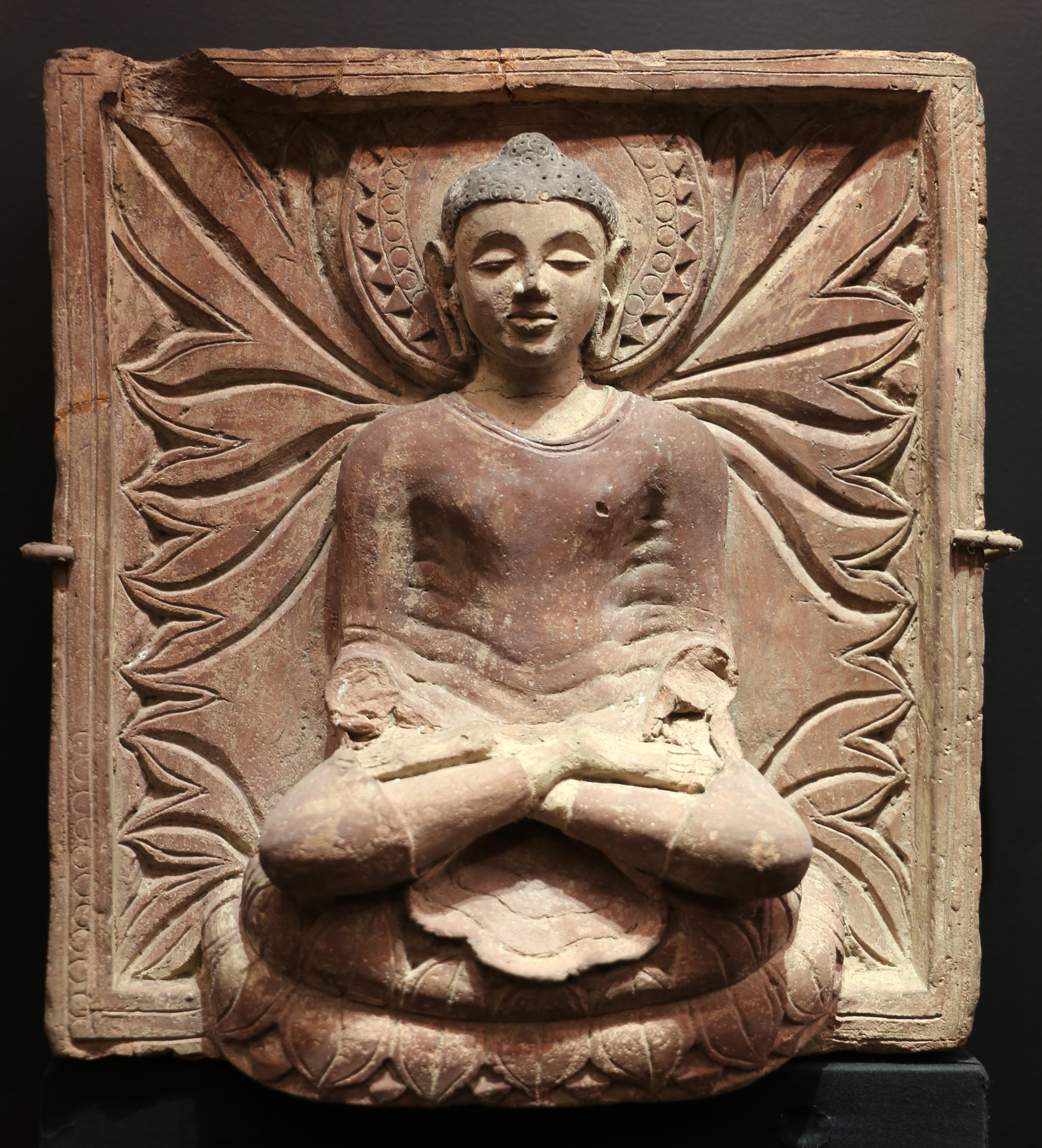
Buddha, Mirpur Khas, circa 410 CE

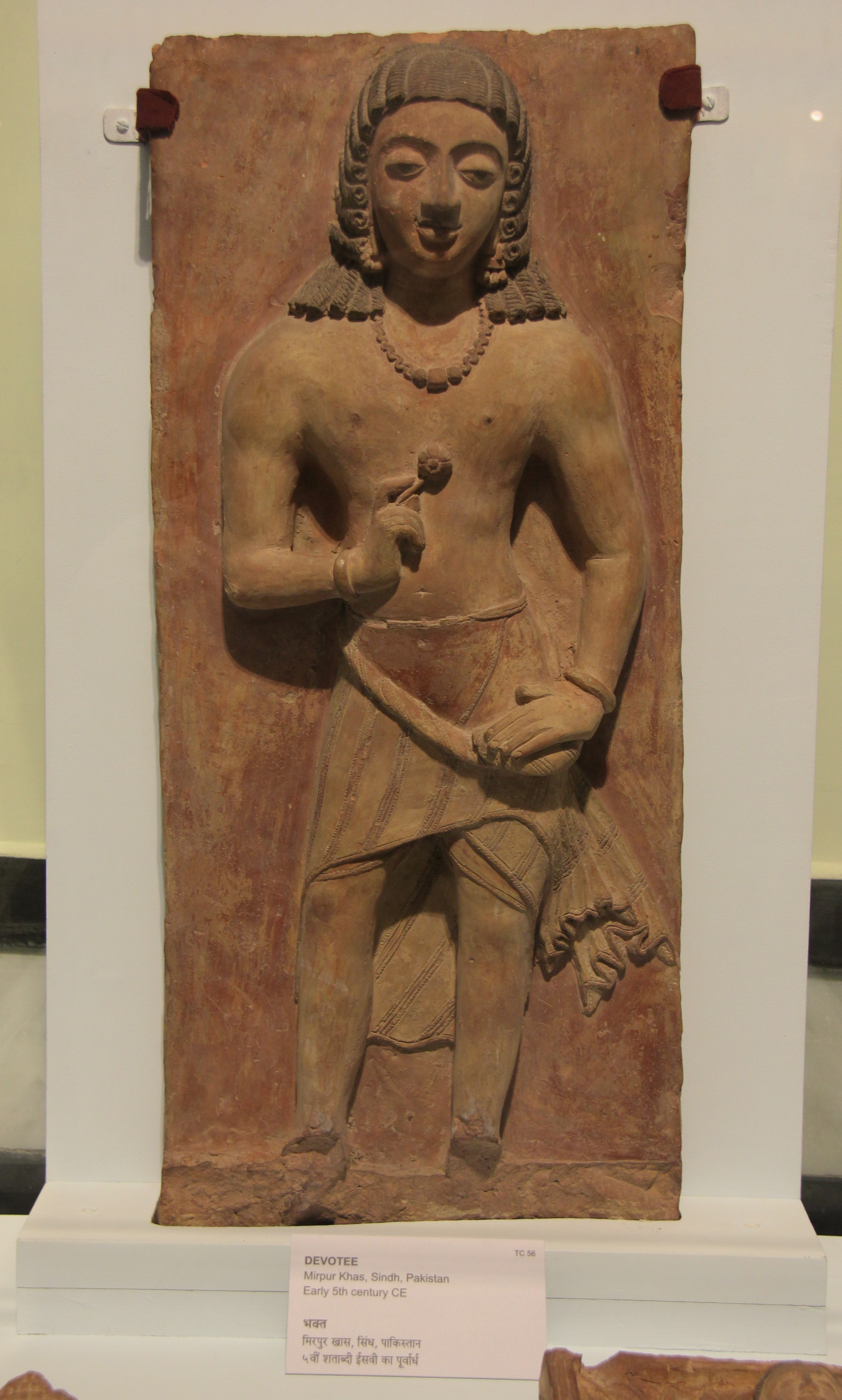
Devotee statue.

== See also ==
- Brahma from Mirpur-Khas
- Devnimori
