= Siraj-ji-Takri =

Siraj-ji-Takri or Seeraj-ji-Takri is a Buddhist archaeological site located in Sindh, Pakistan. The Buddhist city of Siraj-ji-Takri is located along the western limestone terraces of the Rohri Hills in the Khairpur District of Upper Sindh. Its ruins are still visible on the top of three different mesas, in the form of stone and mud-brick walls and small mounds, whilst other architectural remains were observed along the slopes of the hills in the 1980s.
