= Sonmiani Tehsil =

Pakistani administrative area

Sonmiani/Winder Balochi: تحصیل سونمیانی Sonmiyani
- Tehsil of Hub District
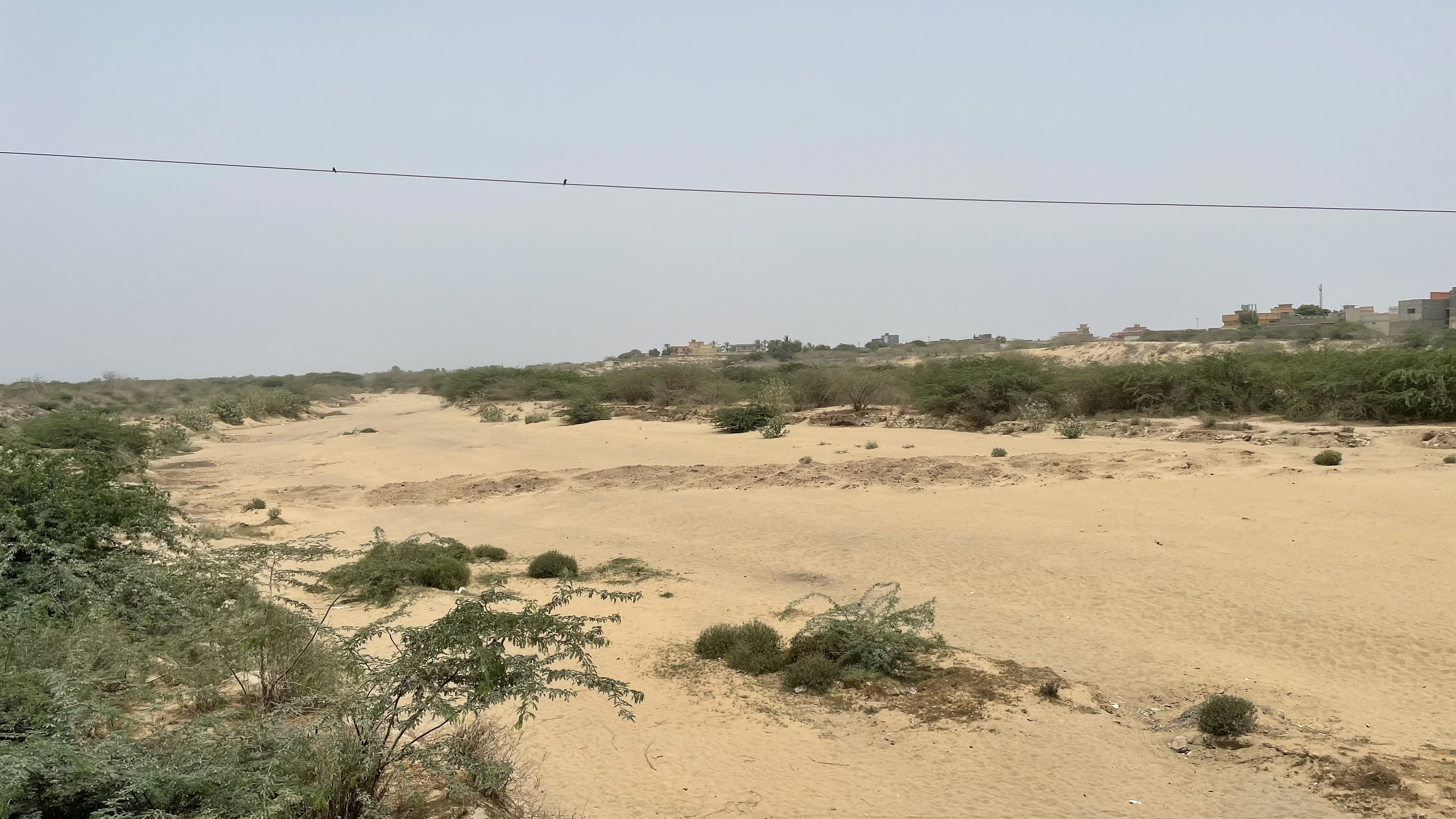
- The dried up riverbed of the Winder River, seen from the N-25 National Highway.

- Location within Balochistan, Pakistan Location within Pakistan
- Coordinates: 25°25′0″N 66°40′0″E
- Country: Pakistan
- Province: Balochistan
- District: Hub District
- Headquarter: Windar

Area
  - Tehsil of Hub District: 2,616 km^{2} (1,010 sq mi)

Population (2023)
  - Tehsil of Hub District: 67,991
  - Density: 25.99/km^{2} (67.3/sq mi)
  - Urban: 35,245 (51.84%)
  - Rural: 32,746 (48.16%)

Literacy
  - Literacy rate: 35.80%
- Time zone: UTC+5 (PST)
- Main languages: 56,457 Balochi, 3,544 Sindhi

Sonmiani, (Note: Balochi: سونمیانی, Brahui: سونمیانی, Urdu: سونمیانی, pronounced [soːnˈmjɑːni]) also referred to as Windar, is an administrative subdivision (tehsil) of Hub District in the province of Balochistan, Pakistan. In 2023, the tehsil had a population of 67,991, more than half residing in urban areas, including its administrative centre Windar.

The tehsil was part of Lasbela District until 2022, when administrative reforms led to the creation of Hub District. The tehsils of the new district, in addition to Sonmiani, are: Dureji, Gadani, Hub, and Sakran.

== Geography ==
Sonmiani Tehsil spans approximately 2,616 square kilometres and features a combination of coastal plains and arid, mountainous terrain. While the majority of the landscape is dry, limited pockets of arable land support agriculture. The tehsil experiences a hot desert climate, (classified under the Köppen system) with sparse rainfall and high summer temperatures. Geographically, the tehsil borders the Arabian Sea, including the coastal waters of Sonmiani Bay and the biologically significant Miani Hor lagoon, a designated wetland of ecological importance.

To the north, near the boundary with Liari and Uthal tehsils of Lasbela District, lies the shallow seasonal Siranda Lake, located between Miani Hor and the N-25 National Highway. The lake holds both ecological and archaeological relevance. Further inland, about 25 kilometres (16 mi) east of Winder town, the Winder Dam is expected to be completed in 2025. It will contribute to local water storage and irrigation, with a capacity of 54,000 acre-feet (67,000,000 m^{3}) and a small hydropower generation capacity of 3 megawatts.

== Population ==
Historical population
Year	Pop.	±% p.a.
1951	...	—
1961	8,787	—
1972	16,210	+5.72%
1981	20,675	+2.74%
1998	31,799	+2.56%
2017	64,019	+3.75%
2023	67,991	+1.01%
Source: Pakistan Bureau of Statistics:

As per the 2023 national census, the tehsil has a total population of 67,991, comprising 32,746 rural and 35,245 urban residents. The town of Windar serves as the tehsil's headquarters and is the primary urban centre. The tehsil includes 14,186 households, of which 6,861 are in rural and 7,325 in urban areas.

The overall literacy rate is 35.80%, with a male literacy rate of 45.58% and a female literacy rate of 25.89%. These figures highlight ongoing challenges in access to education, particularly for women.

=== Languages ===
In Sonmiani Tehsil, Balochi is the predominant language, spoken by approximately 56,457 individuals (~83.1% of the population). Other languages include Sindhi (3,544 speakers, ~5.2%), and Brahui (423 speakers, ~0.6%), with the remaining population speaking various other languages. The Sindhi reported in this context largely refers to Lasi, a distinct local dialect of Sindhi also spoken in the costal region of Balochistan.
