= Damb =

Pakistani village

Damb Lasi: ڊامب
- Village
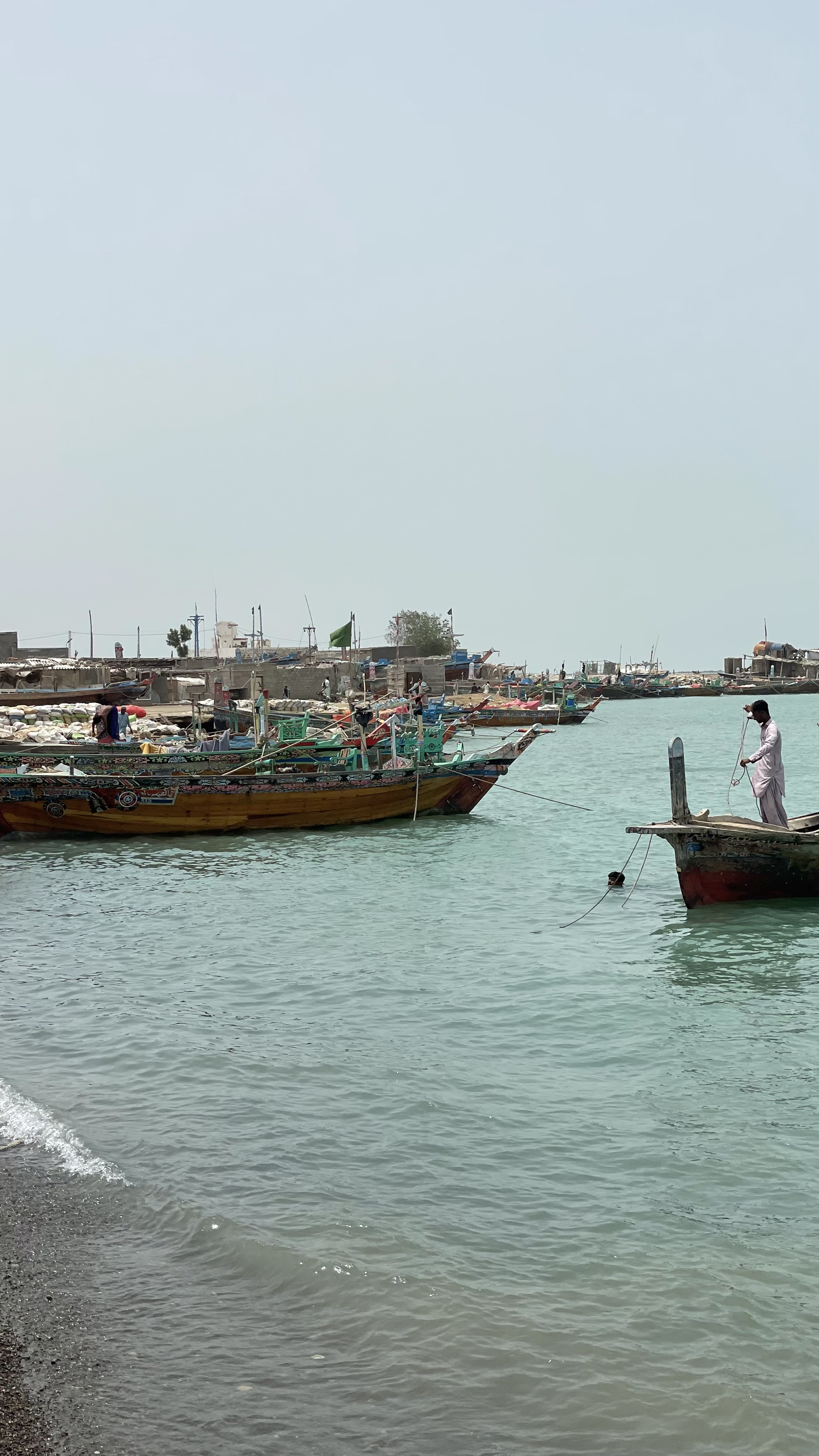
- Fishing Boats at Dumb

- Location within Balochistan, Pakistan Location within Pakistan
- Coordinates: 25°27′0″N 66°33′50″E
- Country: Pakistan
- Province: Balochistan
- District: Hub District
- Tehsil: Sonmiani Tehsil

Area
  - Village: 0.81 km^{2} (0.31 sq mi)
- Elevation: 2 m (6.6 ft)

Population
  - Village: 7,000 (3,000 seasonal)
- Time zone: UTC+5 (PKT)

Damb (Lasi: ڊامب) is a coastal village in southeastern Balochistan, Pakistan, located approximately 80 kilometres northwest of Karachi, within Hub District. It is accessible via road through the town of Winder and the village of Sonmiani, connecting to the N-25 National Highway. The village is located along a narrow waterway between Sonmiani Bay and Miani Hor, facing Rathod's Island. It is bordered by the sea to the west and north, which shapes its maritime character and economic activities.

== Historical background and demographics ==
Damb is believed to be around a century old and is named after a fisherman who was its first settler. Today, the village is home to approximately 7,000 residents across 800 households. The majority of the population belongs to the working class, and most dwellings are modest, with around 40% of houses built from permanent materials. A few large bungalows, owned by prominent fish traders, highlight the local economic stratification.

== Economic infrastructure ==
The village's harbour, known locally as Damb Bandar (Lasi: دمب بندر), has historical hub of artisanal fishing, which remains the primary livelihood. The harbour lies within the ecologically rich Miani Hor Wetland Reserve, a Ramsar site recognised for its biodiversity, including migratory birds and marine life. During the peak fishing season (August to May), approximately 3,000 seasonal workers arrive from other parts of the country to participate in the fishing economy.

== Culture ==
Damb is divided into a commercial zone near the harbour and a residential quarter inland. Seasonal migrants rent huts from locals and are typically restricted to the commercial area, as residents aim to preserve their cultural and social norms. The town supports a vibrant local economy with about 100 shops, and residents primarily speak Lasi dialect (Sindhi), a regional Indo-Aryan language also spoken in neighbouring settlements in Sonmiani Tehsil.

== Environmental challenges ==
The village has long contended with coastal erosion and seasonal storms, but recent years have seen these threats intensify. Sea-level rise, storm surges, and unregulated human activity, including sand extraction and development along the coast, have accelerated land degradation. These changes threaten homes, infrastructure, and the viability of traditional fishing practices, placing the community's future at risk.

In light of these growing environmental threats, there have been increasing calls from both local leaders and environmental organisations for more effective coastal management. Proposed solutions include the restoration of mangrove forests, better land-use regulation, and investment in sustainable infrastructure to help safeguard communities like Damb from further environmental harm.
