= Siranda Lake =

Lake in Balochistan, Pakistan

- Lake Siranda
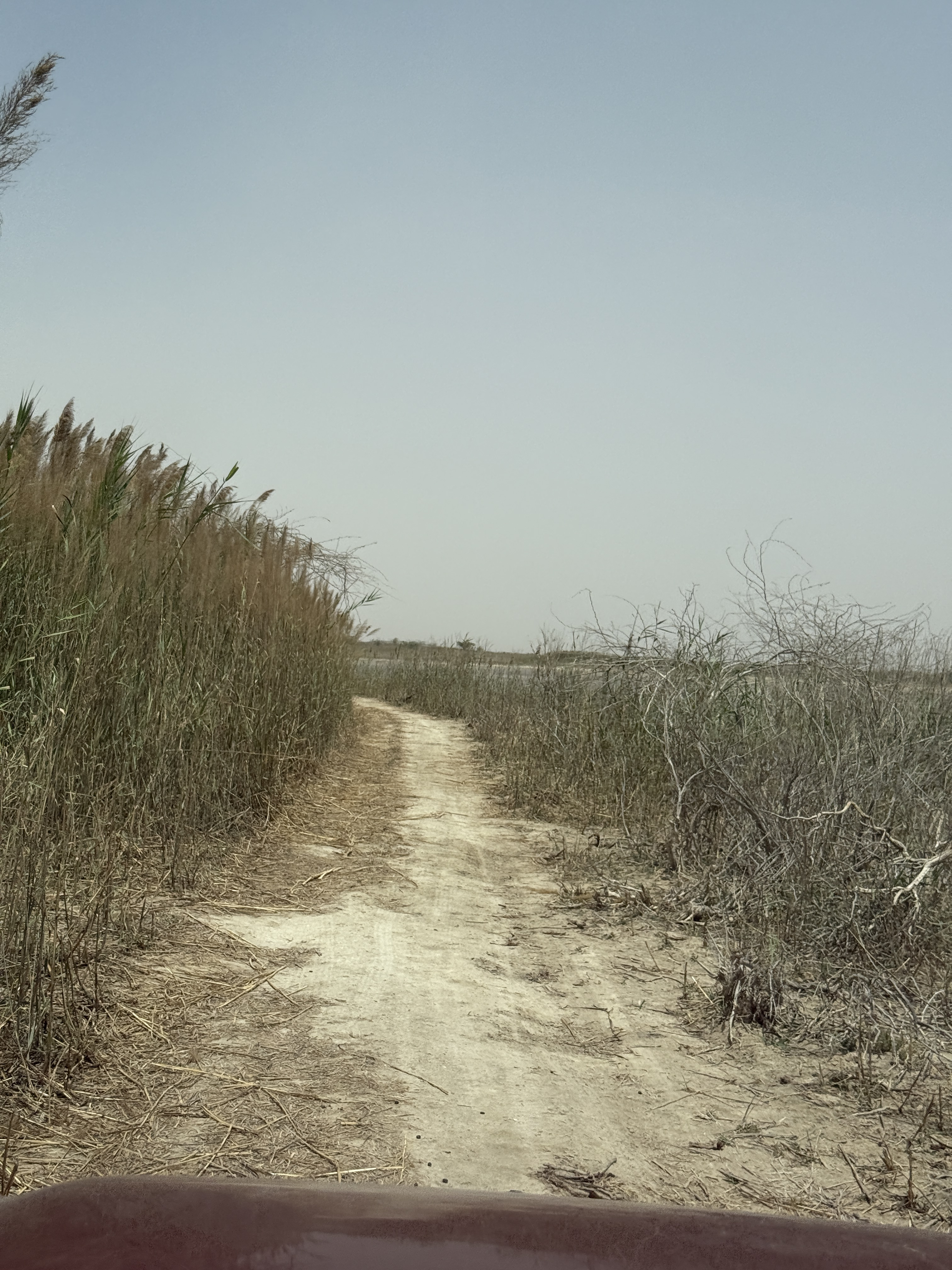
- Dried bed of Siranda Lake
- Interactive map of Siranda Lake
- Location: Sonmiani Tehsil, Balochistan
- Coordinates: 25°32′5″N 66°37′0″E
- Type: Seasonal Lake and wetland
- Basin countries: Pakistan

Siranda Lake (also referred to as Lake Siranda) is a shallow seasonal lake located in the Hub District of Balochistan, Pakistan. It falls on the north of Windar city, and west of N-25 National Highway. The lake is approximately 14 km × 3 km (9 mi × 2 mi) and receives inflows primarily from the Watto River and is occasionally filled by summer monsoon rains. Some researchers consider the Siranda depression to be the dry bed of an ancient lagoon (the Sonmiani Lagoon), formed as the sea gradually receded over time.

== Ecology ==
The lake serves as a vital stopover for migratory birds, particularly the Demoiselle Crane (Grus virgo), during their spring and autumn migrations between Siberia and the Indian subcontinent. Considered one of the most threatened bird species, the Demoiselle Crane was recorded in significant numbers at Siranda Lake. A population monitoring study conducted between 2020 and 2021 documented 271,701 cranes at Siranda Lake, substantially higher than the 50,442 recorded at Sonmiani, establishing it as the primary congregation site in the Hub and Lasbela coastal regions. Based on its high conservation value and ecological importance, the study recommended Siranda Lake for designation as a Ramsar Site.

== Archaeological significance ==
Extensive archaeological surveys conducted between 2011 and 2013 revealed that the area surrounding Siranda Lake was an important center of prehistoric human activity. More than 70 shell middens of varying shapes, sizes, and ages were discovered along the lake's perimeter. Composed primarily of fragmented mangrove gastropods, some middens reach up to three meters in thickness, indicating repeated visits or temporary settlements for shellfish gathering, mainly during the Neolithic period. Radiocarbon dating of 27 middens shows that the area was inhabited between about 7,500 and 4,500 years ago.
