= Kanraj =

Pakistani village

Kanraj کنراج Kanrach
- Village and union council
- Interactive map of Kanraj کنراج
- Coordinates: 26°14′36″N 66°48′9″E
- Country: Pakistan
- Region: Balochistan
- District: Lasbela District
- Tehsil: Kanraj Tehsil
- Elevation: 900 m (3,000 ft)
- Time zone: UTC+5 (PST)

Kanraj, also spelled as Kanrach, (Brahui: کنراج, [ˈkanraːdʒ]) is a village and union council serving as the administrative centre of Kanraj Tehsil in Lasbela District, Balochistan, Pakistan. Situated approximately 125 kilometres northeast of Winder, the village lies within a remote valley within the Kirthar Mountains known for its significant mineral wealth.

Notably, the Duddar mine, located a few kilometres to the south, hosts one of Pakistan's largest lead and zinc extraction operations. Due to the presence of this strategic resource, access to the Kanraj Valley is restricted.

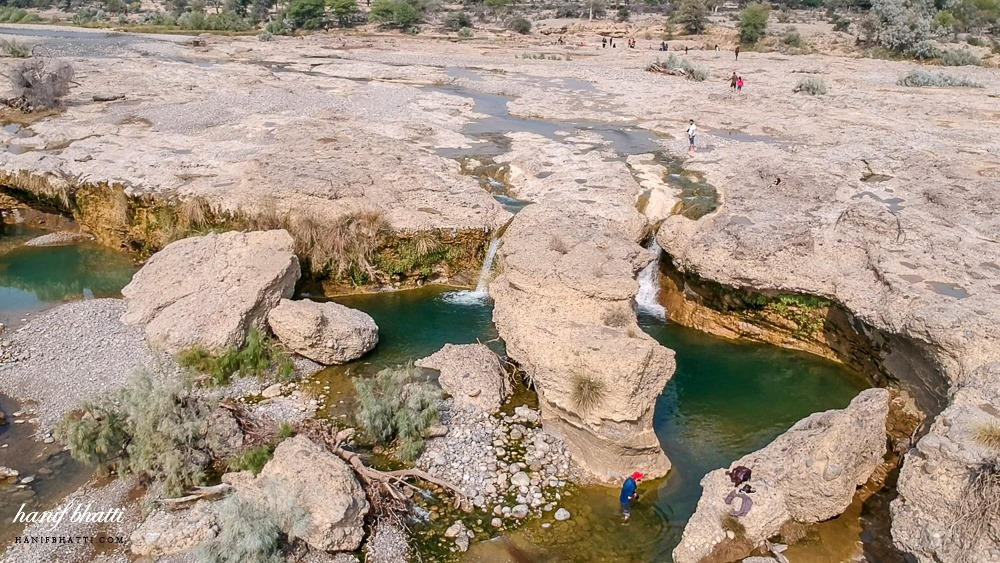
Mugar Pir twin waterfalls

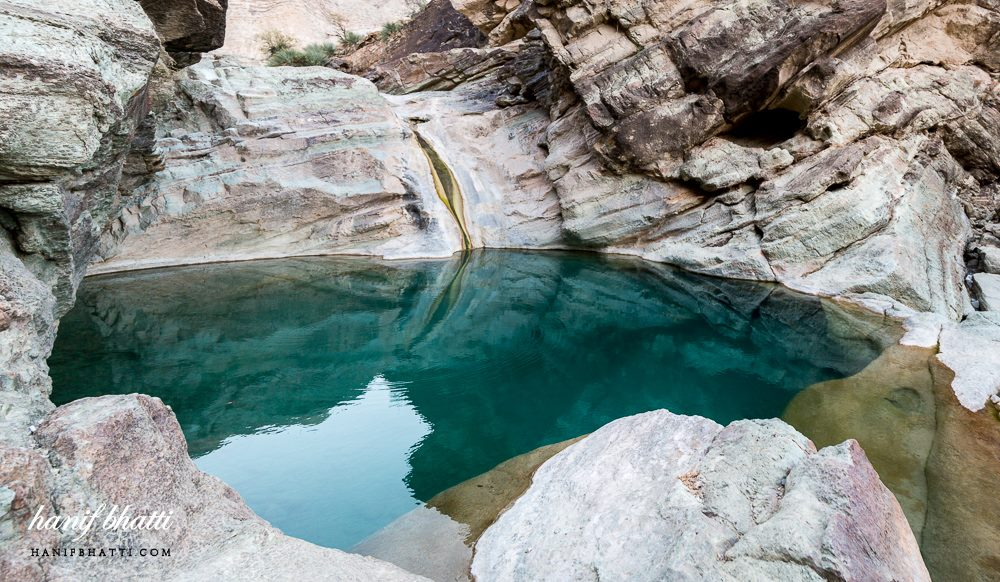
Tubko Chasma Pond
