= Liari =

Pakistani village

Liari لیاری
- Village
- Interactive map of Liari لیاری
- Coordinates: 25°41′20″N 66°29′26″E
- Country: Pakistan
- Region: Balochistan
- District: Lasbela District
- Tehsil: Liari
- Elevation: 11 m (36 ft)
- Time zone: UTC+5 (PST)

Liari (Balochi: لیاری, pronounced [liːˈjɑːri]) is a village and the eponymous union council of Liari Tehsil in Lasbela District, Balochistan, Pakistan. The settlement is located just north of the Makran Coastal Highway, at a point where the route diverges inland toward Lakhra Tehsil. It lies approximately 12 kilometres (7.5 mi) from the junction with the N-25 National Highway, serving as a local access point between the coastal corridor and the interior highlands of the province.
