= Lasbela Division =

Administrative division in Pakistan

Lasbela Division لسبیلہ ڈویژن بخش لاسبیلا
- Division
- Country: Pakistan
- Province: Balochistan
- Capital: Uthal
- Established: 11 July 2026

Government
  - Type: Divisional Administration
  - Commissioner: N/A
  - Regional Police Officer: N/A

Area
  - Division: 44,463 km^{2} (17,167 sq mi)

Population (2023)
  - Division: 859,935
  - Density: 36.03/km^{2} (93.3/sq mi)
  - Urban: 703,374 (37.50%)
  - Rural: 1,172,498 (62.5%)

Ethnicities
  - Language Speakers: Largest: Balochs (99.37%); Others: Brahvis (0.07%)

Literacy
  - Literacy rate: Total: (47.69%); Male: (53.02%); Female: (41.73%)

Lasbela Division (Urdu: لسبیلہ ڈویژن) is a first-order administrative division located in the southeastern coastal region of the Balochistan province in Pakistan.

The division was officially approved by the Balochistan provincial cabinet in May 2026 as part of a sweeping restructuring of the province's administrative boundaries. It was carved out of the southern territories of the historic former Kalat Division to improve local governance, decentralized public management, and regional security along the coastal and industrial belts.

== History ==
Historically, the core of the division comprised the princely State of Lasbela, which acceded to Pakistan in 1948. In 1952 State of Lasbela joined Balochistan State Union then in 1955 Balochistan State Union dissolved to form Kalat Division in the new formed West Pakistan Province and Lasbela granted to the status of a district. In 1960, Lasbela detached from Kalat Division and merge to Karachi district and established Karachi-Bela Division. Following the dissolution of the One Unit system in 1970, the area was integrated into the Balochistan province as Lasbela District.

Due to rapid population growth and massive industrial expansion near the Karachi metropolitan border, the provincial cabinet bifurcated Lasbela in 2022 to create the independent Hub District. In May 2026, the cabinet approved a comprehensive administrative realignment, elevating the region into a standalone division by combining Lasbela, Hub, and the inland Awaran District.

== Geography ==
Lasbela Division occupies a highly strategic geographic position, covering an area of approximately 44,463 square kilometres. It is bounded by the Arabian Sea to the south, Karachi and the Sindh province to the east, the newly renamed Khuzdar Division to the north, and the Makran Division to the west.

The landscape is highly diverse, ranging from the vast agricultural plains of the Porali River basin and the extensive beaches of Sonmiani Bay and Kund Malir, to the rugged, arid mountainous interior of Awaran.

== Administration ==
The division is led by a divisional Commissioner, who oversees public administration, land revenue collection, and law enforcement coordination across the component districts.

=== Headquarters ===
The official administrative headquarters of the Lasbela Division is located in the centrally positioned city of Uthal, which also functions as the traditional capital of the Lasbela District.

=== Districts ===
Lasbela Division is subdivided into three districts:

District	Headquarters	Area (km²)	Population (2023)
Awaran District	Awaran	29,510	178,917
Hub District	Hub	6,716	382,885
Lasbela District	Uthal	8,237	298,133
Total	—	44,463	859,935

== Demographics ==
According to the 2023 National Census of Pakistan, the combined population of the territories now comprising the Lasbela Division stands at 859,935 residents. The population is ethnically diverse; Lasi and Balochi are the predominant languages spoken across the coastal plains and inland mountains, while Brahui, Sindhi, and Urdu are also widely understood and spoken.

== Economy ==
Lasbela Division is a vital economic engine for Balochistan:

- Industry: Hub District contains roughly 95% of Balochistan's organized industrial manufacturing cluster, hosting major installations like the Hub Power Company (HUBCO) and the Cnergyico Oil Refinery. Gadani is home to the world-renowned Gadani Ship Breaking Yard.
- Agriculture and Fisheries: The Lasbela plain supports extensive farming, while the coastal towns of Sonmiani and Gadani rely heavily on modernizing fishing sectors.
- Tourism: The division hosts major landmarks, including Hingol National Park, the sacred Hindu pilgrimage site of Hinglaj Mata, Kund Malir Beach, and the ancient Gondrani Cave City.

== Educational Institutions ==
The division is evolving into an educational hub for southern Balochistan. Key institutions include:

- Lasbela University of Agriculture, Water and Marine Sciences (LUAWMS) in Uthal.
- LUAWMS Inter College, Uthal.
- Government Degree College, Uthal.
- Government Degree College, Bela.
- Government Degree College, Hub.
- Balochistan College of Education, Hub.
- The Hub Cadet College.
- Pak-German Technical Training Institute, Hub.
- LUAWMS Awaran Sub-Campus, Awaran.
- Cadet College Awaran
- Government Boys Degree College, Awaran.
- Government Girls Inter College, Awaran.
- Various public technical and vocational training institutes designed to support the local industrial estates.

== See also ==
- Divisions of Pakistan
- Divisions of Balochistan
- Khuzdar Division
