= Welpat Janobi =

- Town and union council
- Country: Pakistan
- Region: Balochistan
- District: Lasbela District
- Time zone: UTC+5 (PST)

Welpat Janobi is a town and union council of Bela Tehsil in the Lasbela District of Balochistan province, Pakistan.
