= Sheh =

- Town and union council
- Country: Pakistan
- Region: Balochistan
- District: Lasbela District
- Time zone: UTC+5 (PST)

Sheh is a town and union council of Uthal Tehsil in Balochistan province, Pakistan.
