= Sonmiani =

Pakistani village

Sonmiani Balochi: سونمیانی
- Village
- Location within Balochistan, Pakistan Location within Pakistan
- Coordinates: 25°25′20″N 66°36′0″E
- Country: Pakistan
- Province: Balochistan
- District: Hub District
- Tehsil: Sonmiani Tehsil

Population (2023)
  - Village: 3,000
- Time zone: UTC+5 (PKT)

Sonmiani (Balochi: سونمیانی) is a coastal village in southeastern Balochistan, Pakistan. The village is located in Hub District, and is approximately 80 kilometres (50 mi) northwest of Karachi. It is connected by road to the N-25 National Highway via the town Winder. Located near the delta of the Winder River, the village spans about 127 acres, with a population of around 3,000 across over 300 households.

The village lies along the northernmost point of the Arabian Sea, and is known for its scenic Sonmiani Beach, a popular local tourist destination. Sonmiani is part of Sonmiani Tehsil, with nearby Winder serving as the administrative centre.

Sonmiani is notable for its role in Pakistan's space engineering and scientific research at the Sonmiani (space facility). It is also home to the Sonmiani Flight Test Range. In 2019, the Pakistan Economic Coordination Commission announced plans to build a liquid natural gas (LNG) terminal in the area.

== History ==
Historically, Sonmiani was a busy seaport, serving as a trade hub for goods from Central Asia destined for ports like Muscat, Karachi, and Bombay. At its peak, the little town hosted a fleet of 500 fishing boats and 250 large trading vessels. The area was also known for its pearl oyster beds and served as a node on the Indo-European Telegraph Line in the 19th century.

The town was severely affected by the silting of the Winder River delta, which blocked access to Sonmiani Port and devastated the local fishing economy. Many residents were forced to relocate to nearby Damb to sustain their livelihoods.

Etymologically, the name "Sonmiani", derived from the words Son (gold) and miani (port), is attributed to two folk origins: one links it to the Sindhi word son (gold), referencing the prosperity and gold taxes collected by the ruling Jam family; another attributes it to a generous local woman named Soan, known for feeding fishermen and travelers.

== Longest Sea Route ==
Sonmiani is at one end of the world's longest estimated straight-line path over water (32,089.7 kilometres (19,939.6 mi), ending at the Kamchatka Peninsula in the Karaginsky District in Russia).

== Port ==
Sonmiani Port (Urdu: بندر گاہ سونمیانی) is a proposed fourth international seaport in Sonmiani.
