= Duddar mine =

Lead and zinc mine in Balochistan, Pakistan

- Location within Balochistan, Pakistan Location within Pakistan

Location
- Location: Duddar, Kanraj Tehsil, Balochistan, Pakistan; 26°5′20″N 66°50′10″E

Production
- Products: Lead, Zinc

History
- Opened: 1980

Owner
- Company: Metallurgical Corporation of China Limited (51%), Hunan Nonferrous Metals Holding (49%)

Duddar mine is Pakistan's largest underground facility for the extraction of lead and zinc, located in the mineral-rich Kanraj Tehsil of Lasbela District in southeastern Balochistan. The mine is operated by the MCC Huaye Duddar Mining Company (MHD), a joint venture between China Metallurgical Construction Group (MCC), the project's investor and developer, and China Huaye Group, which oversees construction and operations. Since 2014, the venture has modernised the site into the country's first fully operational underground metal mining project, reaching an annual production capacity of 500,000 tonnes by 2020. The maximum mining depth is 1000m and the current mining depth is 600m.

The Duddar mine hosts estimated reserves of approximately 50 million tonnes of ore, with average grades of 3.2% lead and 8.6% zinc, translating to an output potential of around 1.6 million tonnes of lead and 3.5 million tonnes of zinc. Mining operations are facilitated through a one-kilometre-deep vertical shaft with a 7.5-metre diameter and a complex internal rail system for ore extraction. The government of Balochistan has reportedly received over 1 billion Pakistani rupee in royalty payments, while the federal government has collected an additional PKR 210.5 million as presumptive tax and PKR 105.2 million as a development surcharge.

Each month, hundreds of trucks transport lead and zinc ore from the Duddar mine the 200 kilometres (120 mi) to Karachi, following a route that passes through to Winder and further on N-25 National Highway. From Karachi, the extracted minerals are shipped to China for refining and further processing. This logistical corridor serves as a vital link between the remote mining operations in Balochistan and international industrial supply chains.

== History ==
Exploration and technical studies of the Duddar lead-zinc deposits began in 1980. Over the decades, cumulative investments reached US$236 million. These included contributions from international and domestic stakeholders: USD 7 million from UNDP/PMDC, US$20 million from Australia's Pasminco, US$108 million from MCC, and US$101 million from MHD.

Initial development began in 2005 but was halted due to adverse geological conditions and technical challenges. Following an international tendering process, operational rights were transferred in 2014 to the current consortium, which restarted and expanded the project. Before the construction of proper infrastructure, including a connecting road from Winder to Duddar, heavy machinery had to be transported to the site using camels, a reflection of the area's once-remote inaccessibility.

== Controversy ==
Despite financial benefits accruing to federal and provincial authorities through royalties and surcharges, the communities in Kanraj Tehsil and the wider Lasbela District have seen limited improvements in education and healthcare infrastructure as a result of the Duddar mining project. The mine, however, is fully financed by Chinese investors, with 70% of the workforce drawn from within Balochistan, of which 75% are from Lasbela District. The operating company has contributed to local welfare by donating to the National Disaster Management Authority for flood relief in 2022, providing clean drinking water in Kanraj, and distributing food during Ramzan and Eid al-Adha.
