= Wayara =

- Town and union council
- Location in Pakistan
- Coordinates: 26°3′27″N 66°30′12″E
- Country: Pakistan
- Region: Balochistan
- District: Lasbela District
- Elevation: 53 m (174 ft)
- Time zone: UTC+5 (PST)

Wayara or Wayaro is a town and union council of Uthal Tehsil in Balochistan province, Pakistan. It is located at 26°3'27N 66°30'12E with an altitude of 53 metres (177 feet).
