= Liari Tehsil =

Tehsil in Lasbela, Pakistan

Liari Tehsil تحصیل لیاری
- Tehsil of Lasbela District
- Location within Balochistan, Pakistan Location within Pakistan
- Coordinates: 25°40′0″N 66°25′0″E
- Country: Pakistan
- Province: Balochistan
- District: Lasbela
- Capital: Liari

Area
  - Tehsil of Lasbela District: 2,010 km^{2} (780 sq mi)
- Elevation: 10.2 m (33 ft)

Population (2023)
  - Tehsil of Lasbela District: 17,155
  - Density: 8.53/km^{2} (22.1/sq mi)
  - Rural: 17,155 (100%)

Literacy
  - Literacy rate: Total: (16.09%); Male: (21.30%); Female: (10.46%)
- Time zone: UTC+5 (PST)
- Main languages: 16,747 Balochi

Liari (Balochi: لیاری, pronounced [liːˈjɑːri]) is an administrative subdivision (tehsil) in Lasbela District, located in the southeastern part of Balochistan, Pakistan. According to the 2023 national census, the tehsil has a population of 17,155, residing in 152 settlements in rural areas. The town of Liari serves as the administrative centre. The tehsil is sparsely populated and home to several notable natural features.

== Geography ==
Covering an area of approximately 2,010 square kilometres, Liari stretches east to west along the Makran coast. It shares borders with Hub District to the east, Uthal Tehsil, Lakhra Tehsil also of Lasbela District, and Jhal Jhao Tehsil of Awaran District to the north, and Ormara Tehsil of Gwadar District to the west. The terrain is predominantly arid and desert-like, featuring coastal plains along the Arabian Sea and gradually rising into hills traversed by seasonal streams. The ecologically significant lagoon and wetland of Miani Hor lies along its coastal boundary. The tehsil is also known for other remarkable natural features, including the Hingol River, which winds through Hingol National Park, famous for its striking canyons and waterfalls, before merging into the Arabian Sea. Other highlights include the Hingol mud volcanoes and the beaches of Kund Malir, known for their untouched coastal beauty.

Liari has a subtropical desert climate (Köppen classification: BWh), marked by extremely hot summers with average temperatures reaching 41.2 °C (106.2 °F) and cooler, dry winters with average daytime highs of 16.52 °C (61.74 °F) and extreme lows of 6.48 °C (43.66 °F). Annual rainfall is minimal, averaging just over 13.11 millimetres (0.516 in), mainly during the June–September monsoon season. Vegetation is sparse and xerophytic, consisting of thorny shrubs, hardy bushes, occasional trees, and various ephemeral plants.

== Population ==
Historical population
Year	Pop.	±% p.a.
1951	...	—
1961	4,368	—
1972	5,211	+1.62%
1981	8,007	+4.89%
1998	7,846	−0.12%
2017	11,730	+2.14%
2023	17,155	+6.54%
Source: Pakistan Bureau of Statistics:

According to 2023 census, Tehsil had 17,155 population living in 2,589 households, of which nearly half (1,244) lack proper washroom facilities. The population is widely dispersed, resulting in a low population density of about eight persons per square kilometre.

Liari faces significant development challenges, particularly in education. The literacy rate is 16.09%, with a gender breakdown of 21.30% for males and only 10.46% for females, highlighting pronounced gender disparities and limited educational access, especially for women and girls.
