= Gador =

Gador may refer to

- Gádor, a municipality of Almería province, Andalusia, Spain
- Gádor, former Hungarian name of Gakovo, Serbia
- Gadore, a town in Las Bela District, Pakistan
- Tel Gador, an archaeological site (tell) south of Hadera, Israel

== See also ==
- Sierra de Gádor, mountain range in the province of Almería, Spain
