= Lakhra =

Coordinates: 25°51′54″N 66°27′6″E

Lakhra لاکھڑا
- Town
- Interactive map of Lakhra لاکھڑا
- Country: Pakistan
- Region: Balochistan
- District: Lasbela District
- Tehsil: Lakhra Tehsil

Area
  - Town: 1,954 km^{2} (754 sq mi)

Population (2023)
  - Town: 46,744
  - Density: 23.92/km^{2} (61.96/sq mi)
  - Urban: ...
  - Rural: ...

Literacy
  - Literacy rate (2023): 15.31%
- Time zone: UTC+5 (PST)

Lakhra (Urdu: لاکھڑا) is a town and union council of Lakhra Tehsil in Balochistan province, Pakistan. It is located at 25°51'54"N 66°27'6"E with an altitude of 12 metres (42 feet).
