= Bagh Sanja =

Village in Pakistan

Coordinates: 26.292027°N 66.306757°E

Bagh Sanja, also known as Bagh Sanjari or Goth Bara Bagh, is a village in Lasbela District, Balochistan, Pakistan.
