= Gadore =

Coordinates: 26°10′50″N 66°19′55″E

- Town and union council
- Interactive map of Gadore
- Country: Pakistan
- Region: Balochistan
- District: Lasbela District
- Time zone: UTC+5 (PST)

Gadore is a town and union council of Bela Tehsil, Lasbela District, Balochistan, Pakistan. It is located at 26°10'50N 66°19'55E with an altitude of 52 metres (173 feet).
