= Kanraj Tehsil =

Tehsil of Lasbela District, Balochistan, Pakistan

Kanraj Brahui: کنراج Kanrach
- Tehsil of Lasbela District
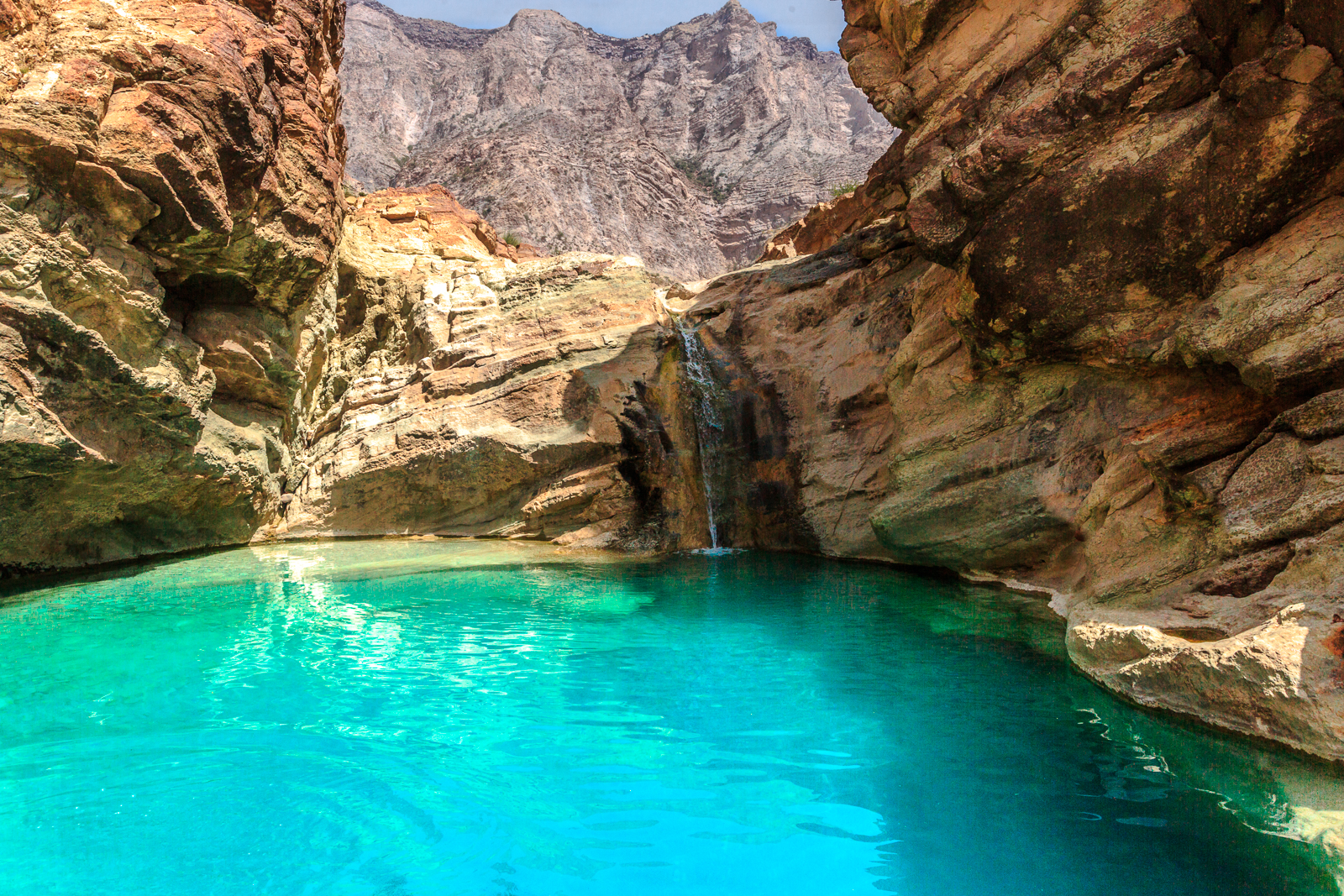
- Kanraj Waterfall

- Location within Balochistan, Pakistan Location within Pakistan
- Coordinates: 26°14′36″N 66°48′9″E
- Country: Pakistan
- Province: Balochistan
- District: Lasbela District
- Headquarters: Kanraj

Area
  - Tehsil of Lasbela District: 1,190 km^{2} (460 sq mi)
- Elevation: 676 m (2,218 ft)

Population (2023)
  - Tehsil of Lasbela District: 15,996
  - Density: 13.44/km^{2} (34.8/sq mi)
  - Rural: 15,996 (100%)

Literacy
  - Literacy rate: Total: (20.32%); Male: (30.80%); Female: (8.93%)
- Time zone: UTC+5 (PST)
- Number of Union Councils: 1
- Main languages: 7,235 Brahui, 4,690 Sindhi, 4,055 Balochi

Kanraj, also spelled Kanrach, (Brahui: کنراج, [ˈkanraːdʒ]) is a tehsil in Lasbela District, in the southeastern part of Balochistan, Pakistan. According to the 2023 national census, the tehsil has a population of 15,996, dispersed across 88 rural settlements. Administratively, Kanraj comprises one Union Council, with the town of Kanraj serving as its administrative centre.

The tehsil holds deposits of zinc and lead, extracted at the Duddar mine.

== Geography ==
Kanraj spans an area of approximately 1,190 square kilometres. It borders the tehsils of Aranji and Saroona in Khuzdar District to the north and east, and Uthal and Bela Tehsil to the south and west. The landscape is predominantly arid and rugged, consisting of hilly terrain and seasonal riverbeds. A key natural feature is the Kanraj River, which supports limited agriculture and local biodiversity.

== Climate ==
The tehsil experiences an arid climate (Köppen classification: BWh). During summer, particularly from April to July, average temperatures range between 25 °C (77 °F) and 30 °C (86 °F), with extreme highs reaching up to 51 °C (124 °F). Winters are short and mild, with average daytime temperatures around 16 °C (61 °F), and nighttime lows occasionally dropping to 0 °C (32 °F). Annual rainfall is scarce, typically between 5.0 millimetres (0.20 in) and 254 millimetres (10.0 in), concentrated during the July–September monsoon season. Vegetation is xerophytic, consisting of drought-resistant shrubs, scattered trees, and seasonal ground cover adapted to arid conditions.

== Population ==
Historical population
Year	Pop.	±% p.a.
1961	2,394	—
1972	4,477	+5.86%
1981	6,287	+3.84%
1998	8,116	+1.51%
2017	12,389	+2.25%
2023	15,996	+4.35%

According to the 2023 census, the tehsil had a population of 15,996 living in 2,722 households, all in rural areas. The overall literacy rate stands at 20.32%, with a gap between 30.80% for males and 8.93% for females.

=== Languages ===
Languages of Kanraj Tehsil (2023)
1. Brahui (45.2%)
2. Sindhi (29.3%)
3. Balochi (25.4%)

In Kanraj Tehsil, Brahui is the predominant language, spoken by approximately 7,235 people (45.23% of the population). Other languages include Sindhi (4,690 speakers, 29.32%) and Balochi (4,055 speakers, 25.35%), with the remaining population speaking other languages. The Sindhi reported in this context largely refers to Lasi, a distinct local dialect of Sindhi also spoken in the coastal districts of Balochistan.

== Economy ==
The Duddar zinc and lead mine, near the town of Kanraj, is described by Dawn as the country's first major underground metal mining project. Since 2014 it has been operated by MCC Huaye Duddar Mining Company, a joint venture involving the state-owned China Metallurgical Group Corporation. The mine reached an annual production capacity of approximately 500,000 tonnes in 2019, and holds estimated reserves of 50 million tonnes of ore. It employs a largely local workforce, though reporting by The China Project has raised concerns about working conditions, low wages, and limited local development. Despite infrastructure improvements such as expanded road access, Kanraj remains among the less-developed tehsils in the district, with limited access to healthcare and education.

== 2022 floods ==
The 2022 floods in Balochistan caused significant damage in Kanraj Tehsil specifically, including damage to homes and the destruction of standing cotton and other crops. The floods caused wider loss of life and infrastructure damage across Lasbela District and Balochistan more broadly.
