= Lakhra Tehsil =

Pakistani administrative area

Lakhra Balochi: تحصیل لاکھڑا Lakhro
- Tehsil of Lasbela District
- Location within Balochistan, Pakistan Location within Pakistan
- Coordinates: 25°51′N 66°27′E
- Country: Pakistan
- Province: Balochistan
- District: Lasbela District
- Tehsil: Lakhra

Area
  - Tehsil of Lasbela District: 1,954 km^{2} (754 sq mi)
- Elevation: 12–32 m (39–105 ft)

Population (2023)
  - Tehsil of Lasbela District: 46,744
  - Density: 23.92/km^{2} (62.0/sq mi)
  - Rural: 46,744 (100%)

Literacy
  - Literacy rate: Total: (15.31%); Male: (22.87%); Female: (7.50%)
- Time zone: UTC+5 (PST)
- Main languages: 36,625 Balochi 7,012 Sindhi

Lakhra (Note: Balochi: لاکھڑا, Sindhi: لاکڙا, pronounced [ˈlaːx.ɾa]) is an administrative subdivision (tehsil) in Lasbela District, located in the southeastern part of Balochistan, Pakistan. As per the 2023 national census, Lakhra has a population of 46,744, residing in 201 settlements in rural areas. The town of Lakhra functions as the tehsil's administrative centre. The region remains largely disconnected from major transport networks and suffers from inadequate electricity infrastructure.

== Geography ==
Covering an area of approximately 1,954 square kilometres, Lakhra is bordered by Awaran District to the west, Bela Tehsil to the north, Uthal Tehsil to the east, and Liari Tehsil to the south. The terrain is mostly flat and arid, interspersed with low hills traversed and seasonal streams.

Lakhra experiences subtropical desert climate (Köppen: BWh), characterised by extremely hot summers, with average highs around 42 °C (108 °F), and mild winters with daytime highs of 16 °C (61 °F) and nighttime lows dropping to 3 °C (37 °F). Annual rainfall is minimal, averaging just over 13 millimetres (0.51 in), mainly during monsoon season from August to September. Vegetation is sparse and adapt to arid conditions, including thorny shrubs, ephemeral grasses, and hardy bushes, occasional trees.

== Impact of 2022 Floods ==
The 2022 floods in Balochistan were particularly devastating in Lakhra resulting in the destruction of homes, businesses and roads. The disaster exacerbated existing challenges in infrastructure and electricity delivery, with long-term effects on livelihoods and mobility.

== Population ==
Historical population
Year	Pop.	±% p.a.
1951	...	—
1961	9,727	—
1972	14,630	+3.78%
1981	19,807	+3.42%
1998	25,474	+1.49%
2017	35,495	+1.76%
2023	46,744	+4.70%
Source: Pakistan Bureau of Statistics:

According to 2023 census, Tehsil had 46,744 population living in 7,378 households. Development indicators reveal substantial challenges, particularly in education. Lakhra records the lowest literacy rate in Lasbela District at 15.31%, with male literacy at 22.87% and female literacy at only 7.50%. These figures reflect gender disparities and limited access to educational facilities, especially for women and girls.

=== Languages ===
In Lakhra Tehsil, Balochi is the predominant language, spoken by approximately 36,625 individuals (~78.4% of the population). Other languages include Sindhi (7,012 speakers, ~15%), and Brahui (672 speakers, ~1.4%), with the remaining population speaking various other languages. The Sindhi reported in this context largely refers to Lasi, a distinct local dialect of Sindhi also spoken in the costal region of Balochistan.
