= Hunan Nonferrous Metals =

Chinese nonferrous metals company

Hunan Nonferrous Metals Holding Group Co., Ltd.
- Type: Subsidiary
- Industry: Nonferrous metals production and sales
- Founded: 2004
- Headquarters: Zhuzhou, Hunan, China
- Area served: Worldwide
- Key people: He Renchun (何仁春) (Chairman)
- Parent: China Minmetals
- Subsidiaries: Hunan Gold Corporation Limited; Zhuzhou Smelter Group; Chenzhou Mining Group

Chinese name
- Simplified Chinese: 湖南有色金属控股集团有限公司
- Traditional Chinese: 湖南有色金屬控股集團有限公司
Transcriptions
Standard Mandarin
- Hanyu Pinyin: Húnán Yǒusè Jīnshǔ Kònggǔ Jítuán Yǒuxiàn Gōngsī

Former logo

Hunan Nonferrous Metals Holding Group Co., Ltd. is a state-owned nonferrous metals company based in Zhuzhou, Hunan Province, China. It is a wholly owned subsidiary of China Minmetals Corporation, which is under the supervision of the State-owned Assets Supervision and Administration Commission (SASAC) of the State Council.

The group is a major player in China's nonferrous metals industry, involved in the mining, smelting, processing, and trading of metals such as antimony, tungsten, tin, lead, zinc, and gold. It oversees a diverse portfolio of industrial and listed companies, and has played a central role in the consolidation of Hunan's mining sector.

== History ==
Some of the group's assets were listed on the Hong Kong Stock Exchange from 2006 to 2015 under the name "Hunan Nonferrous Metals Corporation Limited" (SEHK: 2626). These included stakes in major mining units such as Hunan Yaogangxian Mining Co., Ltd. and Hunan Huangshaping Mining Branch, as well as the Duddar mine project lead-zinc joint venture in Balochistan, Pakistan.

In 2011, China Minmetals acquired control of the holding company, and by 2014, it announced plans to privatize the listed arm, consolidating its assets under the unlisted group structure.

On 1 August 2006, the company acquired a 9.73% stake in Australian miner Compass Resources for 30 million Australian dollars, becoming its second-largest shareholder.

== Subsidiaries and operations ==
=== Hunan Gold Corporation Limited ===
One of the group's most important subsidiaries is Hunan Gold Corporation Limited (湖南黄金股份有限公司), a publicly listed company on the Shenzhen Stock Exchange (SSE: 002155). Headquartered in Changsha, it is engaged in the mining, processing, and sale of gold and antimony. Hunan Gold owns and operates several major mines including the Xinyuan Gold Mine and the globally significant Xikuangshan Antimony Mine. In 2023, it reported revenues of CN¥27.8 billion and a net income of CN¥846.5 million.

=== Zhuzhou Smelter Group ===
Zhuzhou Smelter is one of China's largest zinc producers and a major player in lead and silver smelting. It continues to expand production capacity and refine its environmental protection systems, including a 300,000-ton zinc-based materials project announced in 2023.

=== Chenzhou Mining Group ===
Another major asset under Hunan Nonferrous, Chenzhou Mining is known for its tungsten, bismuth, and rare earth production. It also plays a role in local economic development through mineral resource consolidation and infrastructure support.
