= Winder Dam =

Dam in Balochistan, Pakistan

- Location within Pakistan
- Official name: Winder Dam
- Location: Hub District, Balochistan, Pakistan
- Coordinates: 25°28′22″N 66°51′34″E
- Owner: Water and Power Development Authority (WAPDA)

Dam and spillways
- Impounds: Winder River
- Height: 60 ft (18 m)
- Length: 714 ft (218 m)

Winder Dam
- Operator: WAPDA
- Type: Earth core rockfill dam
- Installed capacity: 0.3 MW

Winder Dam is a proposed small, low-head, earth core rockfill, hydroelectric power generation dam of 0.3 megawatt (MW) generation capacity, located across Winder River about 100 km from Karachi in Hub District, Balochistan province of Pakistan.

The site of the proposed dam is located 25 kilometers from the town of Winder and 66 kilometers from Uthal.

== Main objectives ==
With the construction of the proposed Winder Dam, flood waters of Winder River will be stored. Live storage of the reservoir is 36,167 acre feet, which will be annually available for developing irrigated agriculture. The total command area will be 8,094 ha (20,000 acres) with a high efficiency irrigation system. This project will produce 300 KW electricity. Damming the flow of Winder River will save the floods-related loss of life and property in the area. Water supply will be for drinking and other domestic uses. Seepage from the dam will recharge the ground water reservoir and increase the ground water resource. Women's emancipation will be served by allotment of government land to landless women of the area.

== Other benefits ==
Damming the flow of Winder River will save the flood water for irrigated agriculture development, power generation and water supply for drinking and other domestic uses. The project will bring general uplift of the people in the area by creation of employment and business opportunities. These indirect benefits, such as employment opportunities and consequent rise in the living standard of the people, socio-economic uplift, poverty reduction and women emancipation however cannot be quantified in monetary term. The direct receipt of the project will be available in shape of irrigation service fee (Abiana) and receipt of cost of sale of energy to consumers. The project would greatly increase the development of fisheries in the area and provide recreation and employment opportunities to the residents of the area.

The estimated cost of the project will be US$178 million, out of which US$177.6 million for civil works and US$0.4 million for electro-mechanical works are required. EIRR of the project is 12.24%.

== Features ==
- Type: earth core rockfill dam (ECRD)
- Height: 31 m (102 ft)
- Length: 517 m (1696 ft)
- Estimated mean annual runoff: 40.365 AF
- Gross storage capacity: 36,484 AF
- Live storage capacity: 36,167 AF
- Life of reservoir: 32 years
- Culturable command area: 10,000 acres
- Cropped area: 20,000 acres
- Cropping intensity: 200%
- Hydropower generation: 300 KW
- Spillway design flood: 150,000 cusecs
- Project cost: Rs. 12,412 million
- EIRR: 12.41%
- B.C. ratio: 1.04:1

== Current status ==
- PC-I amounting Rs.1.696 billion approved by ECNEC in its meeting held on September 3, 2009.
- The groundbreaking ceremony was graced by the President of Pakistan Asif Zardari on January 1, 2010.
- Tenders for construction opened on September 28, 2009 and Letter of Acceptance were issued to M/s Techno

Engineering – RSWI JV on February 15, 2010.

- Revised PC-1 amounting to Rs. 12.412 billion cleared by CDWP in its meeting held on June 29, 2010 for

approval of ECNEC.

== See also ==
- List of dams and reservoirs in Pakistan
- List of power stations in Pakistan
- Khan Khwar Hydropower Project
- Satpara Dam
- Gomal Zam Dam
- Duber Khwar hydropower project
