= Bela Tehsil =

Pakistani administrative area

Bela Balochi: تحصیل بیلہ
- Tehsil of Lasbela District
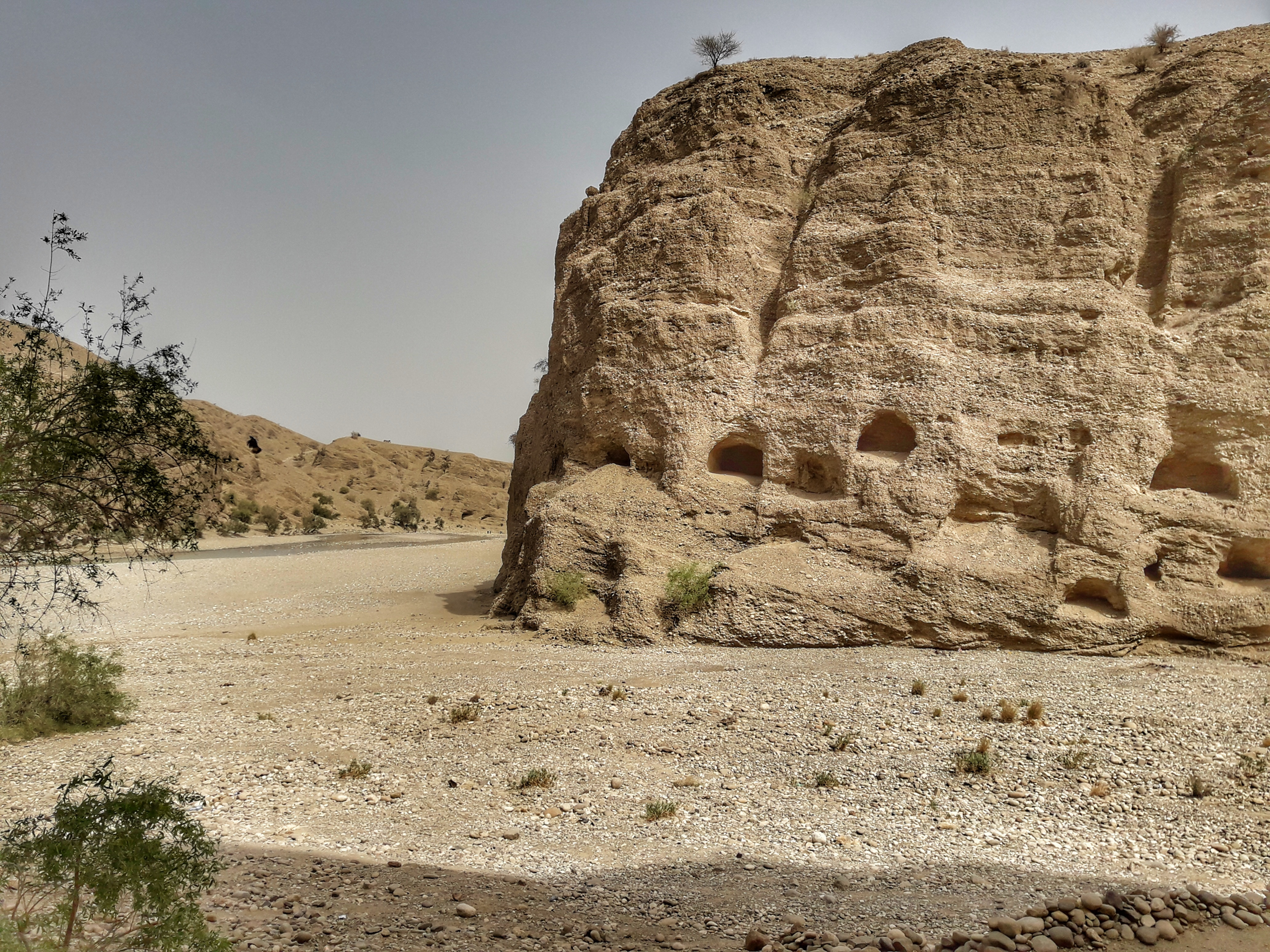
- Cave city, also known as Gondrano, in Bela Tehsil

- Location of Bela Bela (Pakistan)
- Coordinates: 26°14′0″N 66°18′0″E
- Country: Pakistan
- Province: Balochistan
- District: Lasbela District
- Tehsil: Bela

Area
  - Tehsil of Lasbela District: 1,527 km^{2} (590 sq mi)
- Elevation: 85 m (279 ft)

Population (2023)
  - Tehsil of Lasbela District: 129,264
  - Density: 84.65/km^{2} (219.2/sq mi)
  - Urban: 29,380 (22.73%)
  - Rural: 99,884 (77.27%)

Literacy
  - Literacy rate: Total: (40.98%); Male: (51.87%); Female: (29.17%)
- Time zone: UTC+5 (PST)
- Number of Union Councils: 5
- Main languages: 106,105 Balochi, 10,658 Sindhi, 4,327 Brahui

Bela (Note: Balochi: بیلہ, pronounced [ˈbeːla]) is an administrative subdivision (tehsil) in Lasbela District, located in the southeastern part of Balochistan, Pakistan. According to the 2023 national census, Bela tehsil has a population of 129,264, distributed across 388 settlements. The tehsil is divided into five Union Councils, with the town of Bela serving as its administrative centre.

== Geography ==
Bela spans approximately 1,527 square kilometres. It borders Khuzdar District to the north, Kanraj Tehsil to the east, Uthal Tehsil to the southeast, Lakhra Tehsil to the south, and Awaran District to the west. The terrain is predominantly arid and desert-like, with rugged hilly terrain traversed by seasonal streams. Among its notable natural and historical features are the caves of Gondrani, and archeological site, and shrouded in local folklore.

Bela has a hot desert climate (Köppen classification: BWh), characterised by hot, wet summers and short, mild winters. During the summer month, particular from May to July, mean temperature range between 25 °C (77 °F) to 30 °C (86 °F), with extreme highs reaching up to 51 °C (124 °F) in May. Winters are relatively short and warm, with average daytime temperatures around 16 °C (61 °F) while the extreme minima is 0 °C (32 °F). Annual rainfall is limited, generally falling between 127 millimetres (5.0 in) and 254 millimetres (10.0 in), mostly during the July to September monsoon season. The tehsil's vegetation is xerophytic, dominated by thorny shrubs, resilient bushes, scattered drought-tolerant trees, and seasonal ground flora adapted to arid conditions.

== Population ==
Historical population
Year	Pop.	±% p.a.
1951	...	—
1961	22,073	—
1972	32,705	+3.64%
1981	47,835	+4.32%
1998	68,341	+2.12%
2017	104,727	+2.27%
2023	129,264	+3.57%
Source: Pakistan Bureau of Statistics:

According to 2023 census, Tehsil had 129,264 population living in 19,806 households, with 15,827 in rural areas and 3,979 in urban localities. While Bela shows a comparatively higher literacy rate than other tehsils in the district, significant challenges remain. The overall literacy rate is 40.98%, with a noticeable gender disparity: 51.87% for males and only 29.17% for females. This underscores continued barriers to education, particularly for women and girls.

=== Languages ===
In Sonmiani Tehsil, Balochi is the predominant language, spoken by approximately 106,105 individuals (82.07% of the population). Other languages include Sindhi (10,658 speakers, ~8.25%), and Brahui (4,327 speakers, ~3.35%), with the remaining population speaking various other languages. The Sindhi reported in this context largely refers to Lasi, a distinct local dialect of Sindhi also spoken in the costal region of Balochistan.

== 2022 Floods ==
The 2022 floods in Balochistan had a particularly severe impact on Bela Tehsil, where nearly two-thirds of homes, businesses, and road infrastructure were destroyed. The disaster followed an earthquake in May 2022, which significantly worsened pre-existing challenges related to basic infrastructure and electricity provision, with long-term consequences for local livelihoods, mobility, and access to essential services. Recovery efforts have been slow, highlighting the region’s vulnerability to climate-related events.
