= Miani Hor =

Lagoon in Lasbela, Pakistan

Coordinates: 25°32′N 66°12′E

Designations

Ramsar Wetland
- Designated: 10 May 2001
- Reference no.: 1068

Miani Hor is a swampy lagoon southwest of Uthal, lying on the coast of Lasbela District of Balochistan, Pakistan. Covering an area of 7,471 hectares, it was designated a Ramsar site in May 2001.

== Location ==
The site is located just southwest of Uthal, the district headquarter, and 95 kilometres from Karachi, near Sonmiani Bay.

== Site description ==
The lagoon is 60 km long and 4 to 5 km wide. It mouth is 4 km wide. Two seasonal rivers, Porali and Windor enter into this bay. In terms of depth, it is estimated 25-30 m.

== Flora and fauna ==
The lagoon is the only place in Pakistan where three species of mangroves, Avicennia marina, Rhizophora mucronata, and Ceriops tagal occur naturally.

== Threats ==
=== Infrastructure Expansion and Marine Plastic Pollution ===
The construction and opening of the Makran Coastal Highway vastly improved accessibility to the remote coastal settlements of the Lasbela district. However, the subsequent influx of domestic and eco-tourism—coupled with a localized deficiency in municipal solid waste management and trash disposal systems—has led to a sharp increase in marine plastic pollution and coastal littering along prominent beaches such as Kund Malir and Sonmiani.

=== Climate-Induced Ecological Shifts ===
Rising sea surface temperatures driven by global climate change have disrupted localized marine ecosystems and altered species migration patterns across the Balochistan coastline. A prominent manifestation of this ecological shift includes the seasonal proliferation of aggressive pufferfish (Tetraodontidae) swarms along the Lasbela coast. These swarms inflict severe economic and operational damage on artisanal fisheries by tearing through local fishermen's nets and outcompeting or preying heavily upon native shrimp populations.

=== Agricultural Land Conversion and Coastal Sedimentation ===
The clearance of native arid and desert vegetation to reclaim land for agricultural cultivation has significantly compromised the structural integrity of the topsoil in the coastal hinterlands. Devoid of vegetative anchors, the loose soil is highly susceptible to wind and water erosion. Consequently, intense seasonal rain events trigger massive soil erosion, washing substantial volumes of heavy mud, silt, and sand down to the shoreline, resulting in the sedimentation of marine habitats and estuaries.

=== Destructive and Overfishing Practices ===
The coastal waters of Lasbela suffer from severe overfishing due to the unauthorized deployment of destructive fishing gears, such as encircling purse-seine nets (locally termed wire nets or Gujja) and commercial bottom trawlers. These practices, though legally banned under regional conservation laws, routinely trap large volumes of juvenile and non-target marine species as bycatch. This has driven a rapid decline in wild fish stocks and forced local small-scale fishermen into deeper, more hazardous waters to maintain their livelihoods.

=== Extreme Weather Events and Flooding ===
Climate change has amplified the frequency and severity of extreme weather events affecting the Lasbela littoral zone. Short-duration, high-intensity rainfall events regularly trigger catastrophic flash floods down ephemeral river basins like the Porali River, washing urban waste, agricultural runoff, and deep mud blankets directly into coastal ecosystems. Furthermore, severe sea storms and cyclones drive massive marine debris and abandoned fishing gear back onto coastal settlements and ecologically vital sea turtle nesting beaches.

=== Industrial Effluent and Wastewater Discharge ===
Rapid, unplanned coastal urbanization and industrialization have exacerbated liquid waste pollution along the eastern reaches of the Lasbela coast. Due to a systemic lack of industrial water-treatment infrastructure, chemical effluents from nearby industrial estates and toxic runoff from ship-breaking operations are discharged untreated into the Arabian Sea. This alters local water salinity and chemistry, triggering toxic algal blooms and degrading critical marine nursery habitats.

=== Mangrove Deforestation and Sea-Level Rise ===
The critical mangrove ecosystems of the Lasbela coast, notably around the Miani Hor tidal lagoon, are under immense anthropogenic pressure from illegal cutting for timber, fuelwood, and livestock overgrazing. The loss of these mangrove forests severely weakens the coastline's natural defense mechanism, exacerbating coastal erosion and leaving seaside villages highly vulnerable to saltwater intrusion and permanent land degradation caused by rising sea levels.

T
