= Lasbela University of Agriculture, Water and Marine Sciences =

University in Uthal, Pakistan

Coordinates: 25.84159°N 66.62302°E

Lasbela University of Agriculture, Water & Marine Sciences
- لسبیلہ ءِ کشت ءُ کشاری، آپ ءُ دریائی زانتانی دانشگاه
- Type: Public Sector University
- Established: 2005
- Affiliations: Higher Education Commission of Pakistan
- Chancellor: Governor of Balochistan
- Vice-Chancellor: Abdul Malik Tareen
- Location: Uthal, Balochistan, Pakistan
- Campus: Main Campus, Wadh Campus, Dera Murad Jamali Campus
- Website: www.luawms.edu.pk

Lasbela University of Agriculture, Water & Marine Sciences (LUAWMS) is a public university located in Uthal, in Lasbela District, of Pakistan's Balochistan province.

== Accreditation ==
Lasbela University of Agriculture, Water and Marine Sciences is recognized by the Higher Education Commission of Pakistan.

== History ==
- 7 March 2005 - Inception of the university. The university was chartered through Ordinance No. 1/2005, Government of Balochistan, Pakistan.
- 30 March 2005 - Shaukat Aziz, former Prime Minister of Pakistan, handed over the premises of the former Lasbela Textile Mills (LTM) to serve as the location of the university's main campus and announced a grant of Rs. 30 million for its expenses.
- 13 June 2005 - Work on building started.
- 21 June 2005 - Balochistan Chief Minister Mir Jam Muhammad Yousuf announced a matching grant of Rs. 30 million. On the same day, the vacant parts of the LTM buildings were taken over from the Pakistan Industrial Development Corporation.
- 16 August 2005 to date - The Chancellor constituted the Senate of LUAWMS, which would be the supreme body entrusted with governing the university. Since the establishment of LUAWMS, four Senate meetings have been convened.
- 30 November 2005 - BS Marine Sciences and DVM classes were started.
- 6 March 2006 - First admissions were made to BS Agriculture, Economics, and English.
- Classes in the Faculty of Water Sciences started in September 2007.

== Faculties ==
- Faculty of Veterinary & Animal Sciences
- Faculty of Agriculture
- Faculty of Engineering Sciences and Technology
- Faculty of Marine Sciences
- Faculty of Management and Social Sciences
- Faculty of Education
- Faculty of Languages and Literature

== Undergraduate programs ==
- Doctor of Veterinary Medicine (DVM)
- BS Marine Science
- BS Geology
- BS Environment Science
- BS Computer Science
- BS Water Resources Management
- BS Agriculture
- BBA / BSBA
- BS Economics
- BS Sociology
- BS International Relations
- BS Political Science
- BS Islamic Studies
- BS English
- B.Ed (Hons)

== Graduate programs ==
- MS Marine Biology
- MS Marine Fisheries
- MS Economics
- MS Agriculture
- MS English (Linguistics)
- MS Political Science
- MS Education
- MS Integrated Water Resource Management

== Postgraduate programs ==
- PhD Marine Biology
- PhD Economics
