= Uthal =

Uthal اوتھل
- Town
- Location within Balochistan, Pakistan Location within Pakistan
- Coordinates: 25°47′59.99″N 66°36′59.99″E
- Country: Pakistan
- Province: Balochistan
- Division: Lasbela
- District: Lasbela

Population (2023)
  - Total: 37,071
- Time zone: UTC+5 (PST)

Uthal (Urdu: اوتھل; Balochi: اتھل) is a city of Lasbela District in the Balochistan province of Pakistan. Uthal is the headquarters of Lasbela Division, Lasbela District and Uthal Tehsil.

== Demography ==
=== Population ===
Historical population

Year	Pop.	±%
1972	2,296	—
1981	9,404	+309.6%
1998	13,319	+41.6%

Year	Pop.	±%
2017	29,423	+120.9%
2023	37,071	+26.0%

As of the 2023 census, Uthal has a population of 37,071. The population consists principally of Baloch, followed by Sindhis and Pashtuns. The population is predominantly Muslim.

== Education ==
The Lasbela University of Agriculture, Water and Marine Science is located in Uthal, as are BRC College, and Polytechnic College.

In August 2024, a bus with Pakistani pilgrims returning from Iran fell into a gorge near Uthal, killing 10 passengers.
