= Sonmiani Bay =

Bay of the Arabian Sea

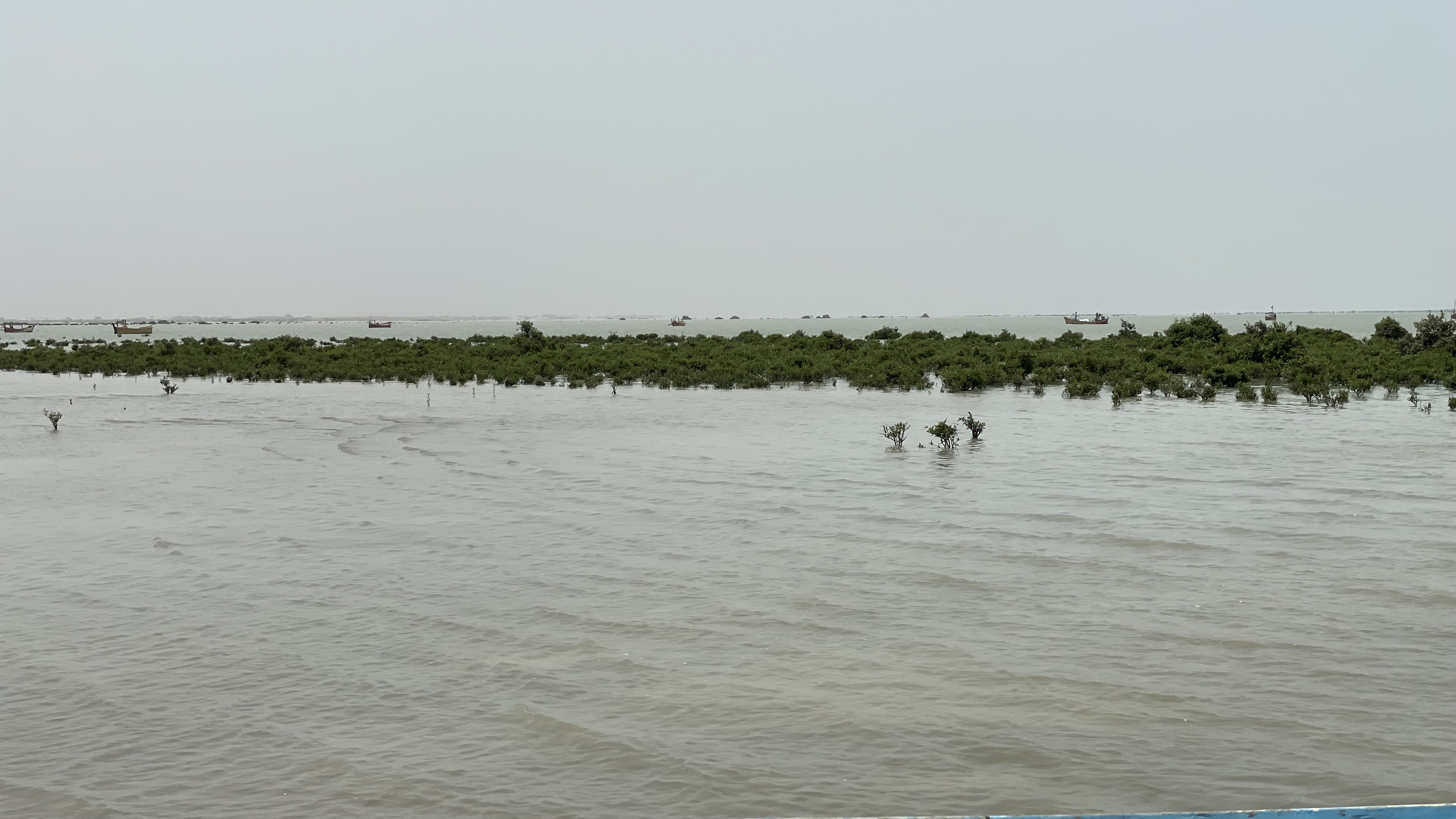
- Mangroves and fishing boats at Sonmiani Bay near Damb

- Location in Pakistan Sonmiani Bay (Pakistan)
- Location: Lasbela District, Balochistan, Pakistan
- Coordinates: 25°10′0″N 66°30′0″E

Sonmiani Bay is situated along the eastern edge of the Makran Coast, on the shores of Lasbela and Hub districts in Balochistan, Pakistan, northwest of Karachi. The bay is sometimes described as marking the northernmost point of the Arabian Sea. It is named after the village of Sonmiani, just north of the Winder River delta. To the northwest, it adjoins the Miani Hor lagoon, a shallow and ecologically rich estuarine system, separated from the bay by a peninsula of sand dunes.

== Physical and Ecological Features ==
The bay's shores are lined with mudflats, sandy beaches, and mangrove forests, which provide habitats for marine and bird species and help protect the coast. Local fishing communities depend on the bay for both artisanal and commercial fishing, with common catches including shrimp, crab, pomfret, and mackerel.

== Fishing and Livelihoods ==
Fishing has long been an important livelihood for communities around Sonmiani Bay. Siltation at the Winder delta has since changed access to traditional fishing grounds. Windar and Sonmiani together host at least 15 fishmeal processing plants. The bay is also home to rare dolphin species and, occasionally, whales.

== Conservation and Environmental Challenges ==
Miani Hor, connected to the bay, is designated as a Ramsar Wetland of international importance for its role as a breeding and migratory habitat for birds and a nursery for fish. The bay itself has no such protected status, and faces growing pressure from overfishing, mangrove degradation, pollution from nearby settlements and industry, and unregulated coastal development.

Non-governmental organisations and the Balochistan Forests & Wildlife Department have raised concerns about these pressures.

The bay also has strategic and industrial significance. Its coastal area hosts the Sonmiani Spaceport, the primary launch facility of Pakistan's national space agency SUPARCO, and the Pakistan Air Force uses the nearby range for live-fire demonstrations and training. The nearby Gadani Ship Breaking Yard adds maritime pollution to the bay, and since 2018 the Economic Coordination Committee (Pakistan) has directed feasibility studies into a proposed liquefied natural gas (LNG) terminal at Sonmiani.
