= Windar =

Pakistani town

Windar Balochi: ونڈر
- Town
- Winder
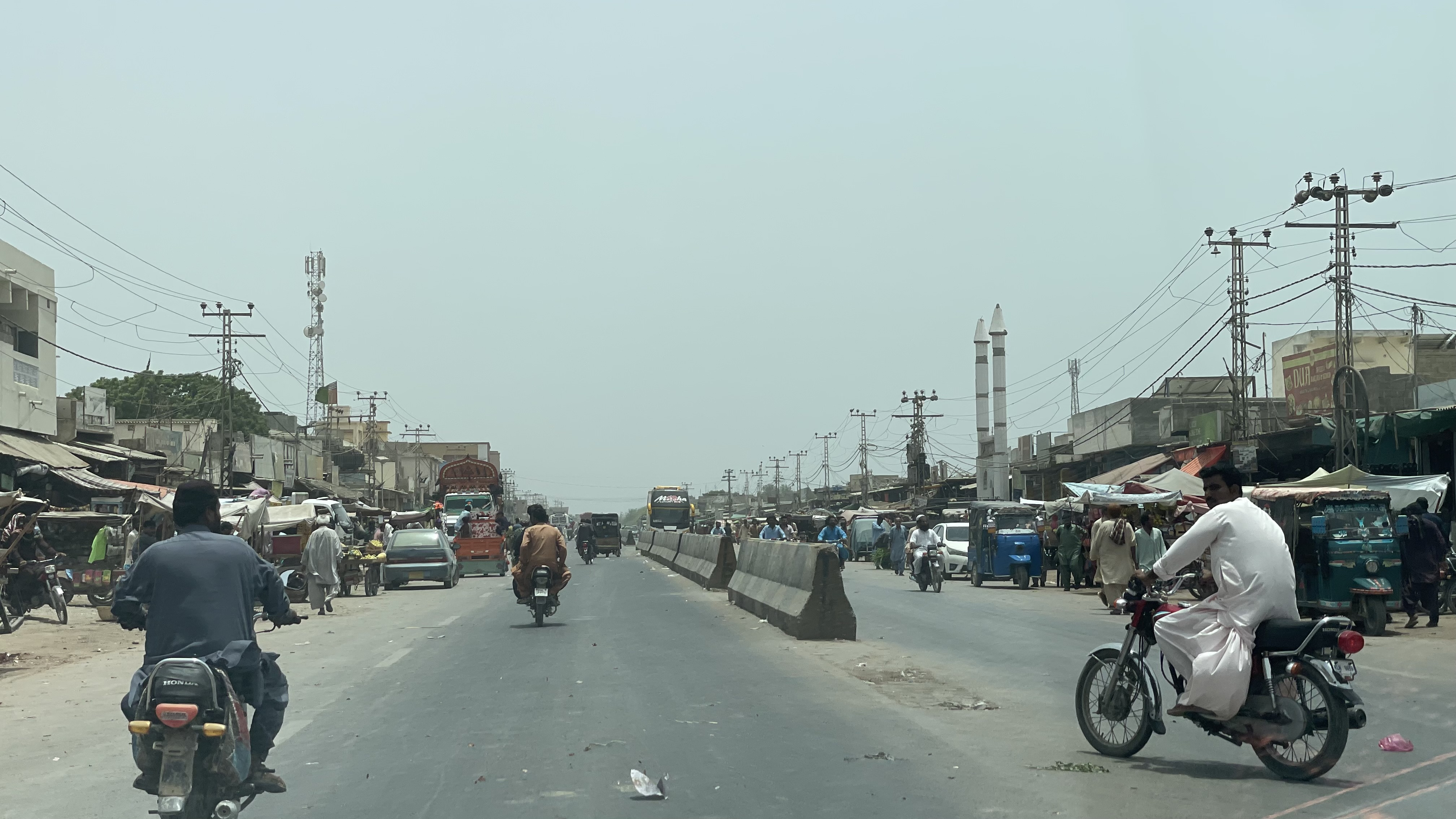
- The N-25 National Highway passes through the town of Winder.
- Interactive map of Windar
- Coordinates: 25°23′14″N 66°39′55″E
- Country: Pakistan
- Province: Balochistan
- Division: Qalat
- District: Hub
- Tehsil: Sonmiani
- Elevation: 5 m (16 ft)

Population (2023)
  - Total: 35,245
- Time zone: UTC+5 (PST)
- Postal code: 90210

Windar (also spelled Winder; Balochi: ونڈر, Urdu: وندر) is the administrative capital of Sonmiani Tehsil in Hub District, located in Balochistan, Pakistan. As of the most recent data, the town has a population of 35,245. It is after Hub the second largest town in the district. The N-25 National Highway, the principal road link between Karachi and the rest of Balochistan, passes directly through the town of Winder.

The proposed 3-megawatt Winder Dam across the Winder River is located 25 kilometers from Winder.

== Population ==
Historical population
Year	Pop.	±% p.a.
1951	...	—
1961	...	—
1972	...	—
1981	...	—
1998	11,569	—
2017	29,598	+5.07%
2023	35,245	+2.95%
