= Uthal Tehsil =

Uthal اٹھل
- Tehsil
- Interactive map of Uthal اٹھل
- Coordinates: 25.8167°N 66.6°E
- Country: Pakistan
- Province: Balochistan
- District: Lasbela

Area
  - Tehsil: 1,756 km^{2} (678 sq mi)

Population (2023)
  - Tehsil: 88,933
  - Density: 50.65/km^{2} (131.2/sq mi)
  - Urban: ...
  - Rural: ...

Literacy
  - Literacy rate (2023): 33.95%
- Time zone: UTC+5 (PST)
- Number of towns: 1
- Number of Union Councils: 7

Uthal (Urdu: اتھل) is an administrative subdivision (tehsil) of Lasbela District in the Balochistan province of Pakistan. The tehsil is administratively subdivided into seven Union Councils and is headquartered at the city of Uthal.

== Demographics ==
=== Population ===
Historical population
Year	Pop.	±% p.a.
1951	...	—
1961	...	—
1972	...	—
1981	...	—
1998	...	—
2017	...	—
2023	88,933	—

As of the 2023 census, Uthal tehsil has population of 88,933. Tehsil Uthal's population consists of Baloch and Lasi. The population is predominantly Muslim.

== Education ==
The Lasbela University of Agriculture, Water and Marine Science is located in Uthal.

== See also ==
- Tehsils of Pakistan
  - Tehsils of Balochistan, Pakistan
  - Tehsils of Punjab, Pakistan
  - Tehsils of Khyber Pakhtunkhwa, Pakistan
  - Tehsils of Sindh, Pakistan
  - Tehsils of Azad Kashmir
  - Tehsils of Gilgit-Baltistan
