= N-25 National Highway =

Road from Karachi to Chaman border via Quetta in Pakistan

National Highway 25
- قومی شاہراہ ٢٥
- قومی شاہراہ ۲۵

Route information
- Part of AH7
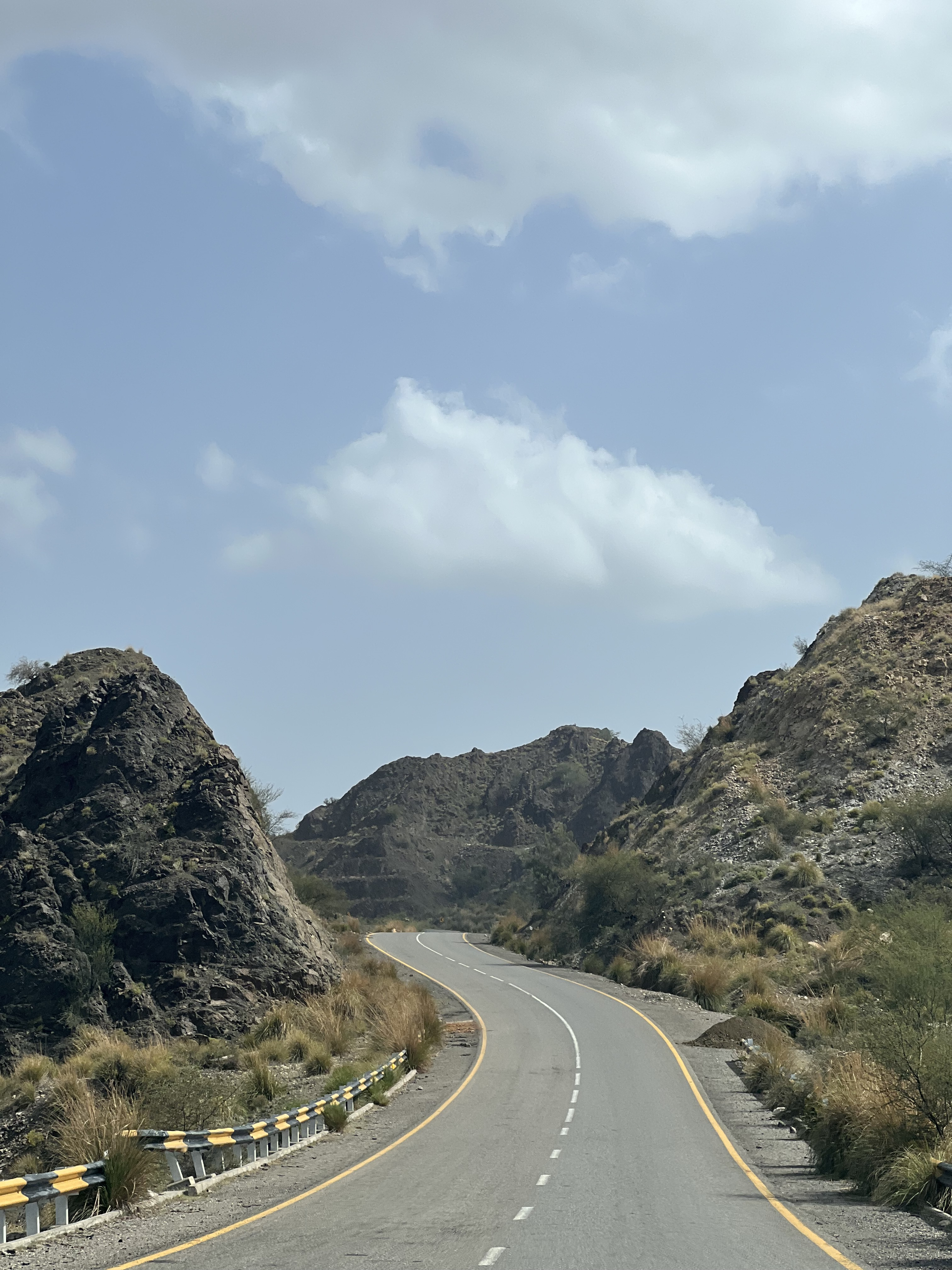
- Maintained by A section of single-laned N-25 National Highway, also known as RCD Highway. National Highway Authority
- Length: 813 km (505 mi)

Major junctions
- From: Karachi
- To: Chaman

Location
- Country: Pakistan
- Major cities: Bela, Khuzdar, Kalat, Quetta, Chaman

Highway system
- Roads in Pakistan

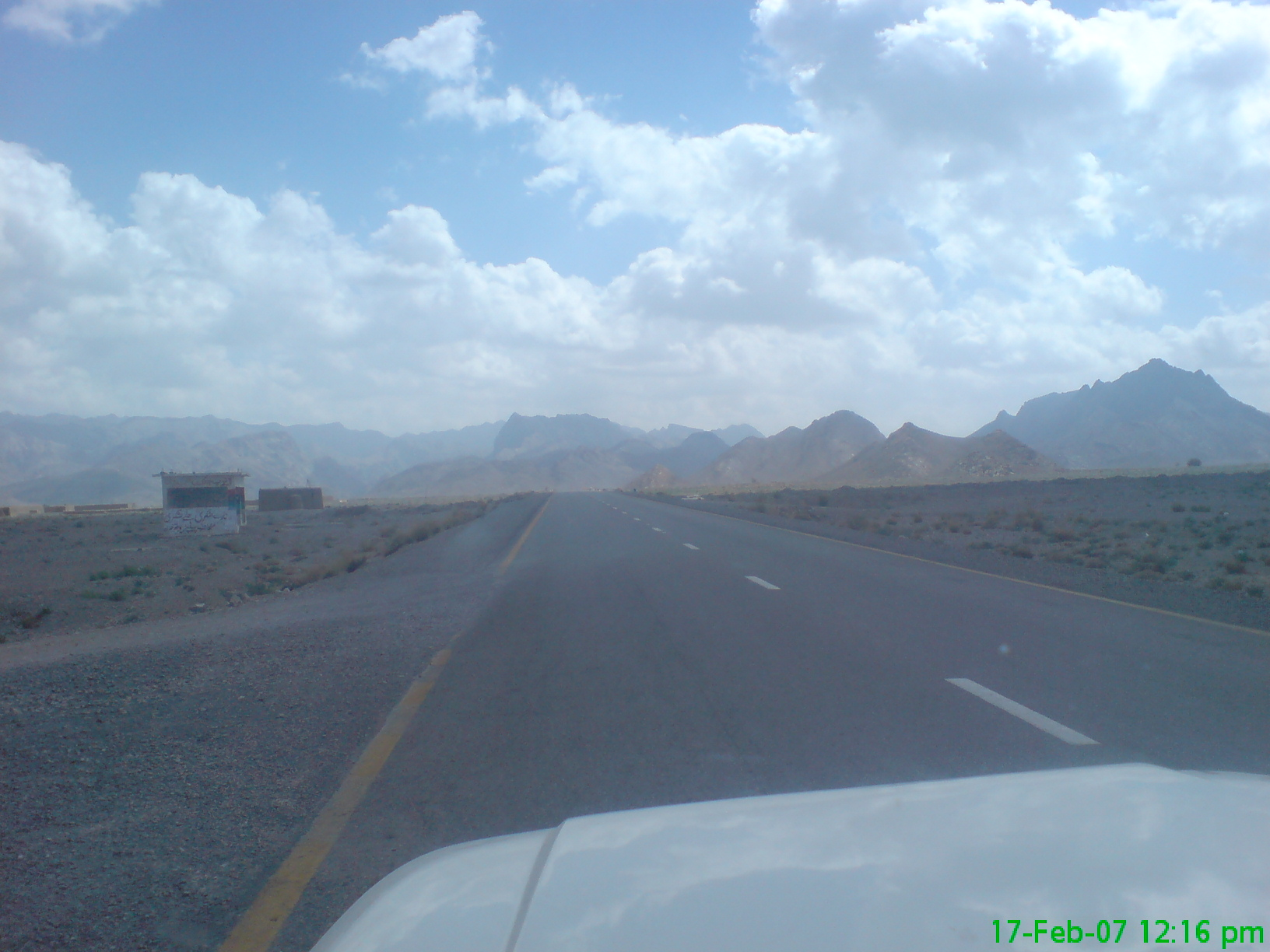
N-25 near Khuzdar, Balochistan.

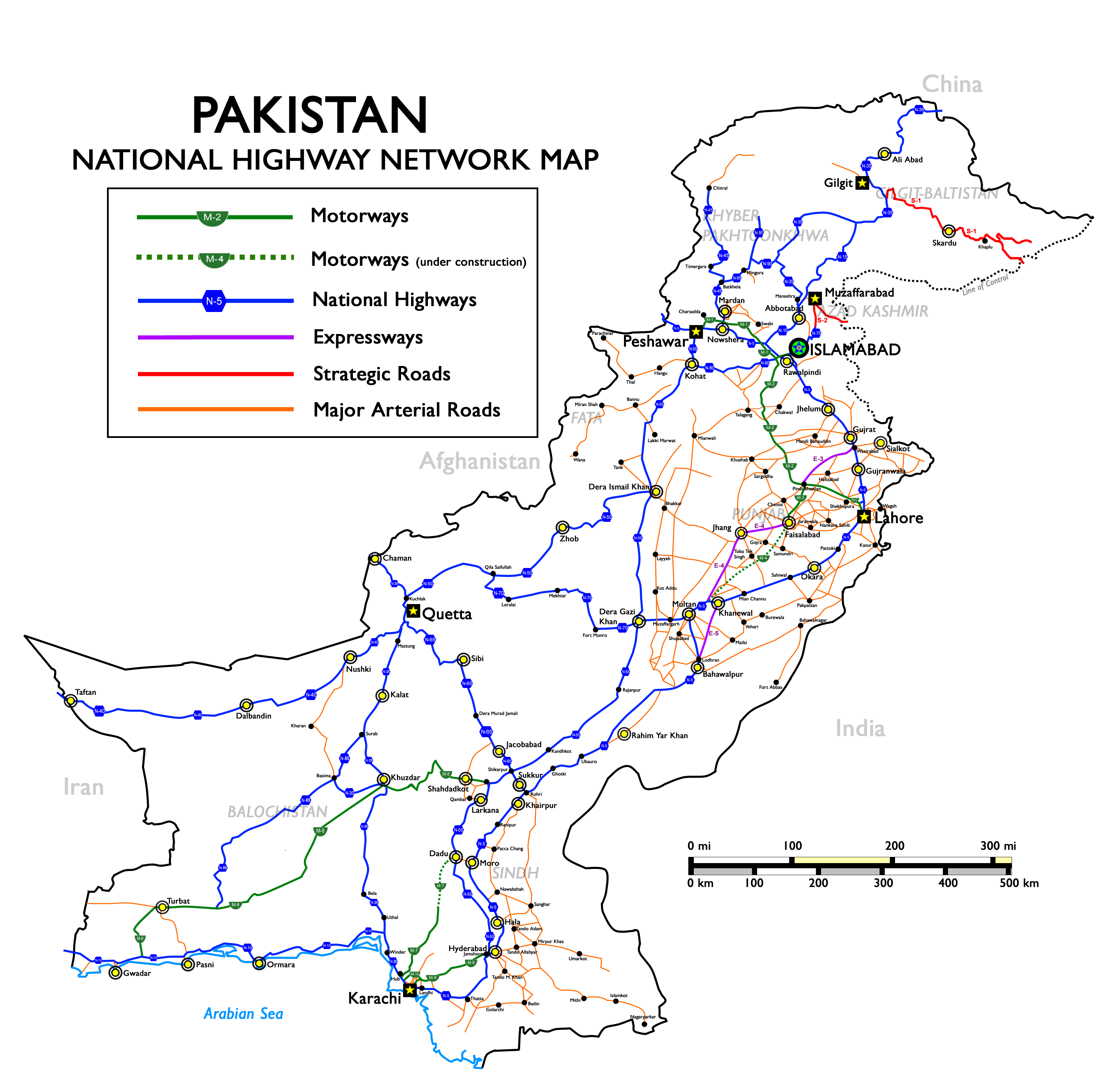
Map of National Highways of Pakistan also indicating N25

The N-25 or Pakistan Expressway (Urdu: قومی شاہراہ ۲۵) is a 813 km national highway in Pakistan is a single-lane highway which extends along from Karachi in Sindh province to Pakistan's Chaman border with Afghanistan via Quetta in Balochistan province of Pakistan. The highway is also known as the Regional Cooperation for Development Highway (RCD Highway), or notoriously as the Killer Highway. In April 2025, Government of Pakistan announced that money saved from oil prices are being spent on making this a motorway standard highway. In the same month, government reiterated its commitment to improve this highway by investing Rs.300 billion.

On 5 December 2025, the National Highways Authority (NHA) began reconstruction of the N-25 highway in order to improve safety on the route and reduce travel times.

== Safety and Security ==
The highway is infamously known as the killer highway due to high number of driving accidents. According to Pakistan Pakistan Bureau of Statistics, more than 4000 people have died due to road accidents on this highway from 2012-2022.

In 2022, the highway was closed for traffic due to damage caused by flash floods. A major bridge connecting Karachi to Balochistan at Hub Chowki collapsed due to the heavy monsoon rains. The government announced that the rebuilding of bridge could take at least 18 months. In February 2025, the reconstruction of the bridge was completed and it was reopened for traffic.

Armed militants belonging to the Balochistan Liberation Army (BLA) and other separatist groups have routinely blocked the major highways in Balochistan, including the N-25 National Highway. In March 2025, Government of Balochistan took an unprecedented decision to ban night travel on the highway on various locations from 6PM to 6AM citing security concerns.

On 5 December 2025, the National Highways Authority (NHA) began reconstruction of the N-25 highway in order to improve safety on the route and reduce travel times.

== See also ==
- China–Pakistan Economic Corridor
- Economic Cooperation Organization
- Motorways of Pakistan
- National Highways of Pakistan
- Transport in Pakistan
- National Highway Authority
