= Lasbela District =

District in Balochistan, Pakistan

Lasbela District ضلعِ لسبیلہ لسبݔله دمگ
- District
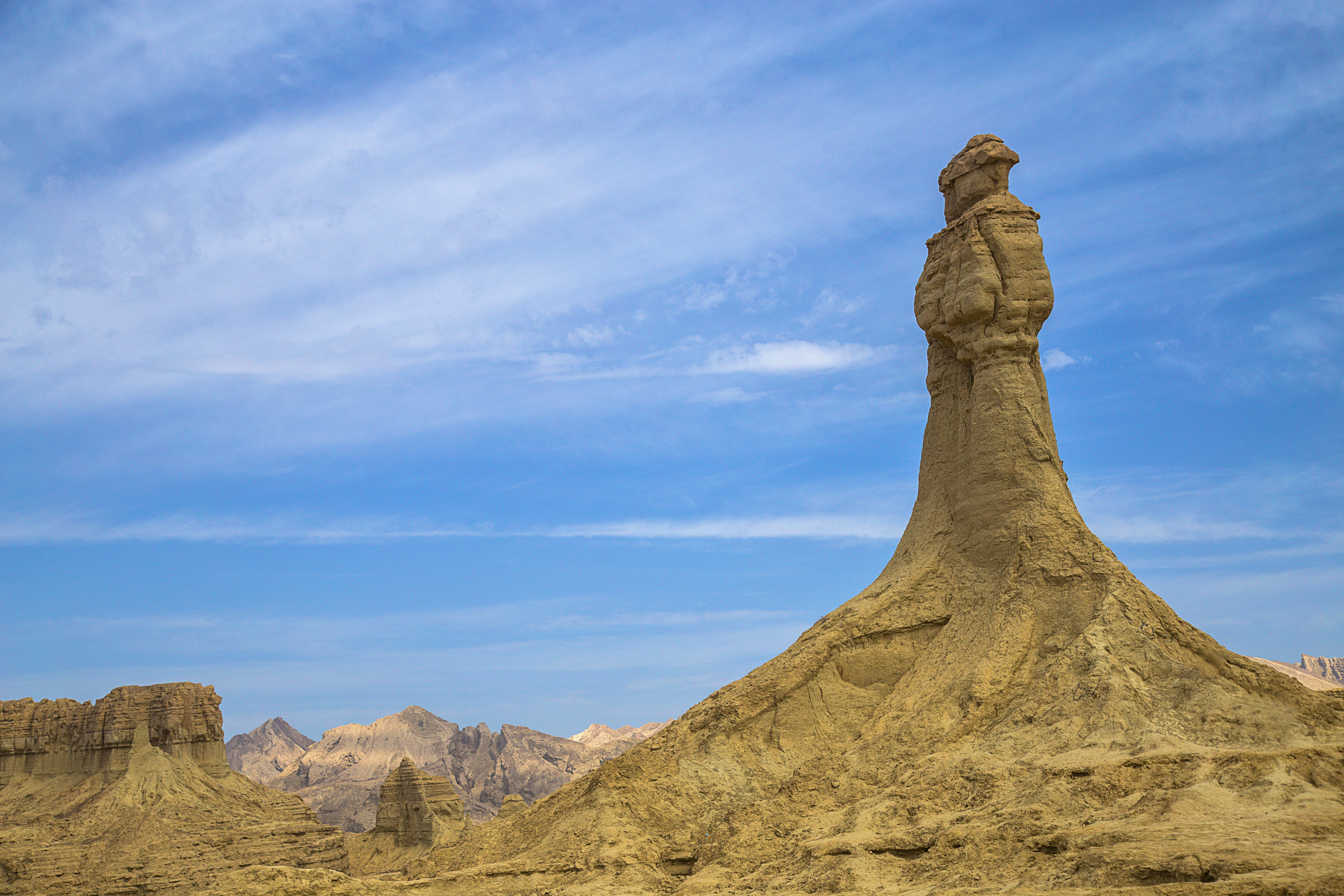
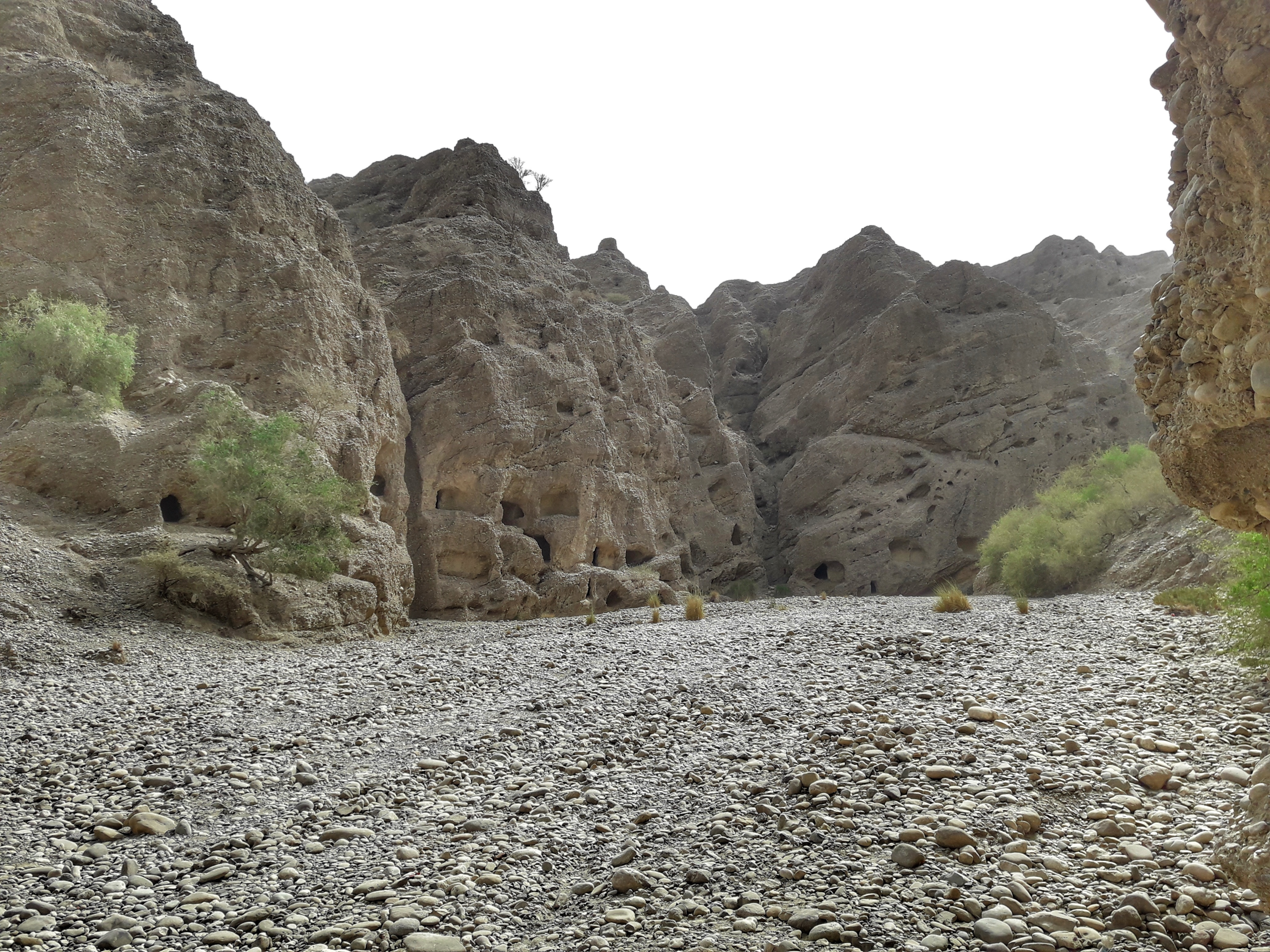
- Top: Princess of Hope in Hingol National Park; Bottom: Gondrani Cave City

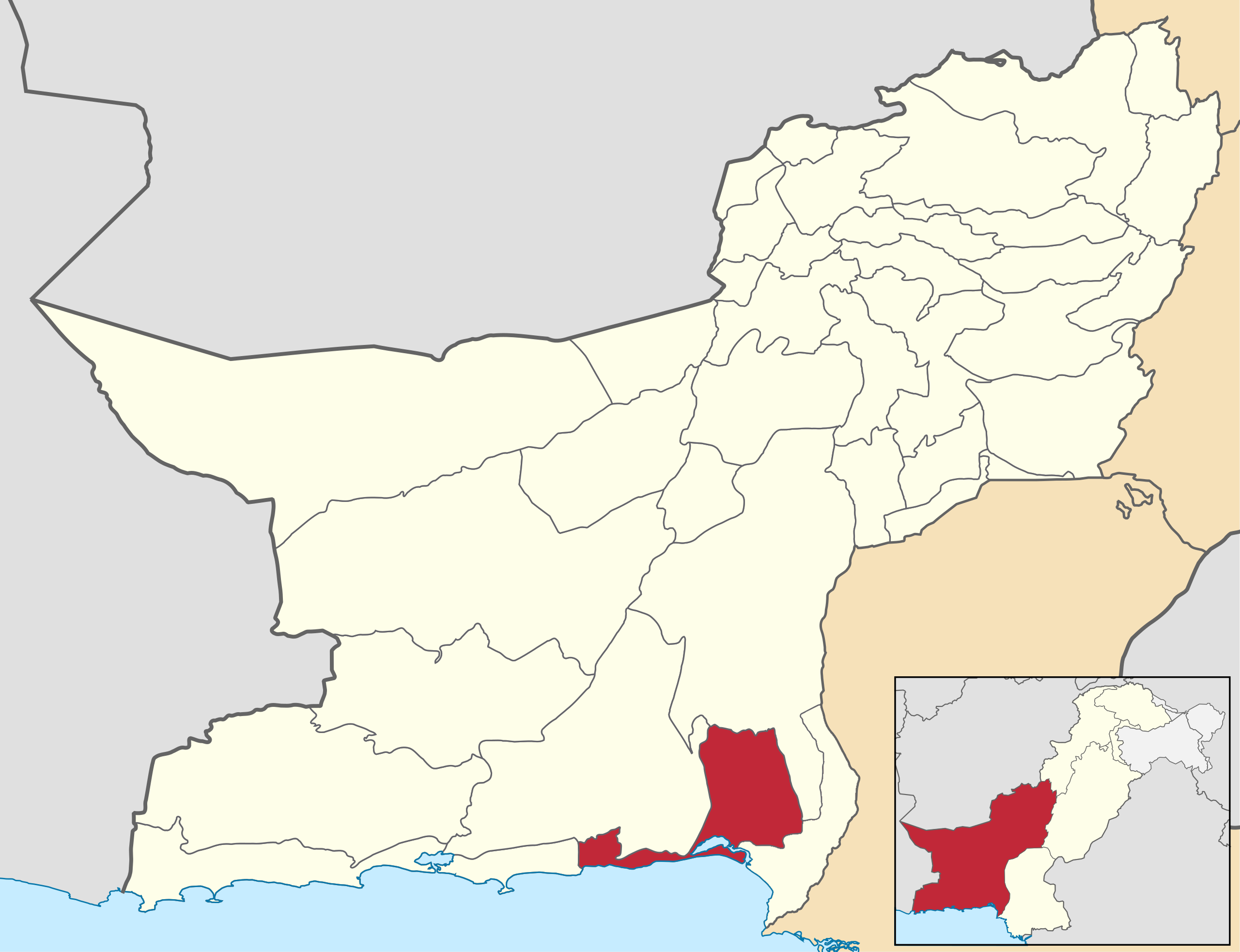
- Map of Balochistan with Lasbela District highlighted
- Coordinates: 25°13′38″N 66°18′22″E
- Country: Pakistan
- Province: Balochistan
- Division: Lasbela
- Established: June 1954
- Headquarters: Uthal

Government
  - Type: District Administration
  - District Police Officer: N/A
  - District Health Officer: N/A

Area
  - District: 15,153 km^{2} (5,851 sq mi)

Population (2023)
  - District: 680,977
  - Density: 44.940/km^{2} (116.39/sq mi)
  - Urban: 330,585 (48.54%)
  - Rural: 350,392 (51.46%)

Literacy
  - Literacy rate: Total: (36.47%); Male: (45.86%); Female: (26.48%)
- Time zone: UTC+5 (PST)
- Number of Tehsils: 5

Lasbela District (Urdu: لسبیلہ Lasbēla [ləsˈbeːla], Balochi: لسبݔله Lasbèla [lasˈbeːla]) is a coastal district situated in the south-east of Balochistan, Pakistan approximately 100 kilometres (62 mi) northwest of Karachi.

As per the 2023 Pakistani census, Lasbela had a population of 298,092.

Lasbela experiences a hot and humid subtropical climate, with summer temperatures frequently exceeding 45 °C (113 °F), while winters remain relatively mild, ranging from 10 °C (50 °F) to 20 °C (68 °F). Rainfall is scarce, typically ranging from 60 millimetres (2.4 in) to 100 millimetres (3.9 in) annually.

The principal languages spoken are Balochi and Lasi (a dialect of Sindhi). The town of Uthal serves as the district's administrative headquarters.

== History ==
The early history of Lasbela is for most parts obscure, until the rise of Aliani family of Jamotes in the 18th century. In the early 7th century CE, the ruler of Armanbel (present-day Bela) was a Buddhist known as Samani, who descended from the governors appointed by Rai Sahiras, the maharaja of Sind. When Chach of Aror marched to Makran he was cordially received at Bela, and the ruler of Bela pledged his loyalty to him.

The district lied on the route taken by Muhammad ibn al-Qasim during his invasion of Sind. It later formed part of the walayat al-Sind during the Caliphate period.

Afterwards the Sindhi dynasties of Soomra and Samma appear to have held control of Lasbela. Sammas were overthrown by Shah Hussein Arghun in 1523, However Lasbela remained under Local Sindhi Sammat Clans such as Roonjha, Burfat, Gunga are believed to have exercised a semi-independent control of the region.

In 1742–1743, Jam Ali Khan, the chief of the Jamote tribe from the Koreja Family of Samma Dynasty, established his control over Lasbela with the help of Khan of Kalat. His descendants, known as Jam of Lasbela, ruled the state until 1947, when Jam Ghulam Qadir Khan acceded to Pakistan. In 1960 Lasbela was combined with Karachi to form Karachi-Bela Division. It was returned to Kalat Division in 1972. Hub District was carved out of Lasbela in 2022.

== Administration ==
The district of Lasbela is administratively divided in four tehsils, one sub-tehsil and 22 Union Councils.

| Tehsil | Area (km²) | Pop. (2023) | Density (ppl/km²) (2023) | Lit. rate (2023) | Union Councils |
|---|---|---|---|---|---|
| Uthal Tehsil | 1,756 | 88,933 | 50.65 | 33.95% | Uthal; Wayara; Kenwari; Sheh |
| Lakhra Tehsil | 1,954 | 46,744 | 23.92 | 15.31% | Lakhra |
| Bela Tehsil | 1,527 | 129,264 | 84.65 | 40.98% | Bela; Welpat Shumali; Welpat Junubi; Kathor; Gador |
| Kanraj Tehsil | 1,190 | 15,996 | 13.44 | 20.32% | |
| Liari Tehsil | 2,010 | 17,155 | 8.53 | 16.09% | |

== Geography ==
The main rivers of Lasbela are Porali River with its tributaries, Winder River and Wirhab River. Other rivers are the Phor and Hingol which rise in Awaran District before flowing through Lasbela District on their way to the Arabian Sea.

== Demographics ==
Historical population
| Year | Pop. | ±% p.a. |
|---|---|---|
| 1951 | 68,189 | — |
| 1961 | 82,997 | +1.98% |
| 1972 | 125,263 | +3.81% |
| 1981 | 188,139 | +4.62% |
| 1998 | 312,695 | +3.03% |
| 2017 | 576,271 | +3.27% |
| 2023 | 680,977 | +2.82% |

=== Population ===
As of the 2023 census, Lasbela district has 115,539 households and a population of 680,977. The district has a sex ratio of 105.04 males to 100 females and a literacy rate of 32.47%: 45.86% for males and 26.48% for females. 209,038 (30.7% of the surveyed population) are under 10 years of age. 330,585 (48.55%) live in urban areas.

=== Language ===
Languages of Lasbela district (2023)
1. Balochi (75.3%)
2. Sindhi (10.0%)
3. Brahui (8.10%)
4. Pashto (2.60%)
5. Others (4.00%)

In the 1951 Census of Pakistan, 80% of population of former state of Las Bela was reported to be speaker of Sindhi, forming a majority. The share of Balochi was 19%. At the time of the 2023 census, the share of Sindhi fell to 10% while that of Balochi rose to 75.3%. Other first languages include Brahui (8.1%) and Pashto (2.6%).

=== Religion ===
Religions in Lasbela district (2023)
| Religion | Percent |
| Islam | 96.55% |
| Hinduism | 2.92% |
| Christianity | 0.37% |
| Other | 0.16% |

In the 2023 census Islam was the predominant religion with 96.55% followers. Hinduism in Balochistan has 2.92% followers. There is also a small Christian minority.

== Education ==
The Lasbela University of Agriculture, Water and Marine Science (LUAWMS) is located in Uthal.

== Economy ==
In the south east, an oil refinery Cnergyico was constructed in 2014 at Hub in Lasbela District which is capable of processing 120,000 barrels of oil. Furthermore, a power station is located adjacent to refinery, that produces about 1350 MW of power.

== See also ==
- Tehsils of Pakistan
  - Tehsils of Balochistan
- Districts of Pakistan
  - Districts of Balochistan
- Divisions of Pakistan
  - Divisions of Balochistan

== Bibliography ==
- 1998 District census report of Lasbela. Census publication. Vol. 57. Islamabad: Population Census Organization, Statistics Division, Government of Pakistan. 1999.
