= Quetta Division =

Administrative division of Balochistan, Pakistan

Coordinates: 30°15′N 68°30′E

Quetta Division کوټه څانګه کویٹه ولایت بخش کویته
- Division
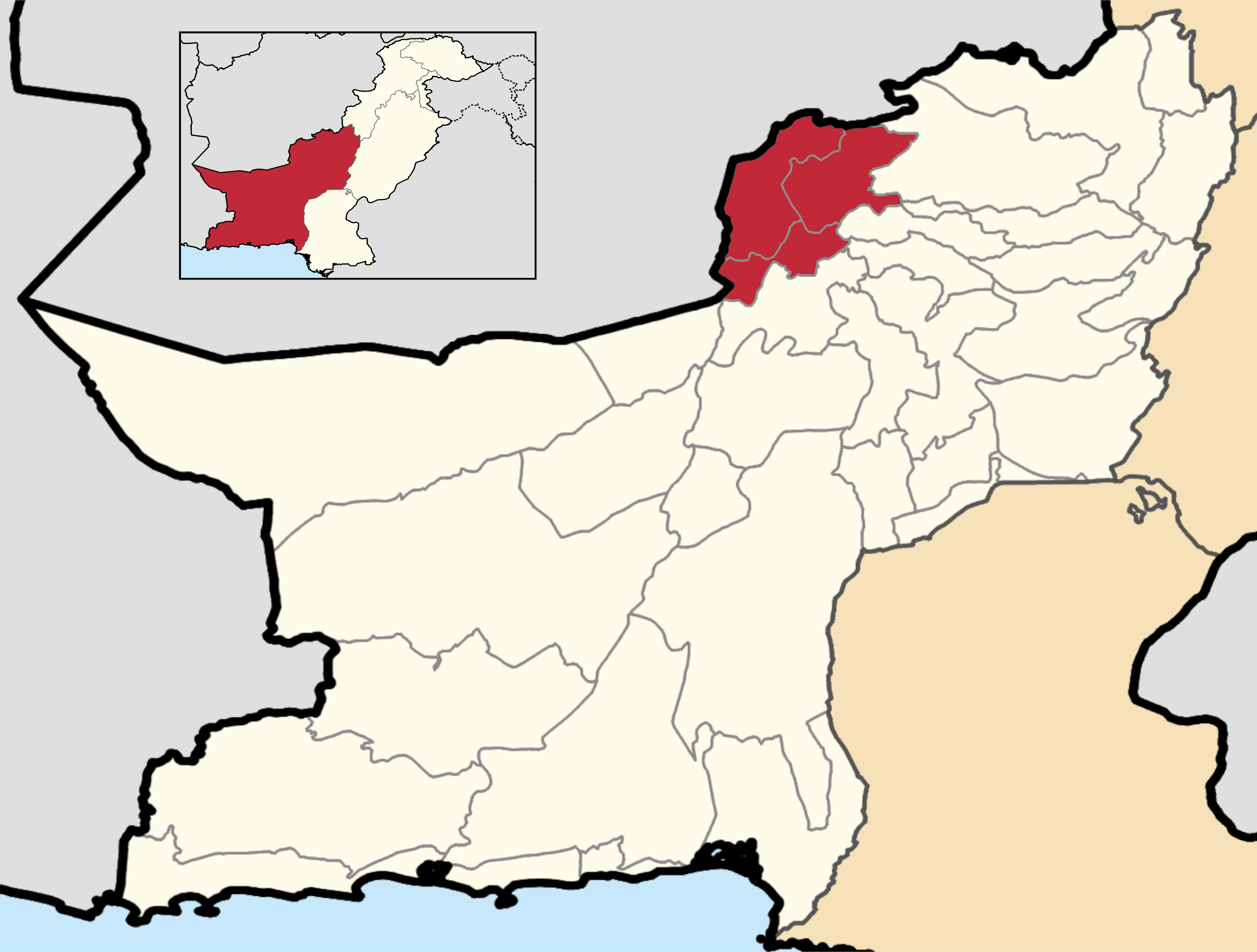
- Map of Quetta Division
- Country: Pakistan
- Province: Balochistan
- Capital: Quetta
- Established: 14 October 1955

Government
  - Type: Divisional Administration
  - Commissioner: Muhammad Hamza Shafqaat (BPS-20 PAS)
  - Regional Police Officer: Abdul Hayee Baloch (BPS-20 PSP)

Area
  - Division: 14,559 km^{2} (5,621 sq mi)

Population (2023)
  - Division: 4,259,163
  - Density: 292.55/km^{2} (757.69/sq mi)
  - Urban: 1,974,854 (46.37%)
  - Rural: 2,284,309 (53.63%)

Language Speakers
  - Speakers: Largest: Pashto (76.54%); Others: Brahvi (9.08%) Balochi (4.50%) Dari

Literacy
  - Literacy rate: Total: (51.68%); Male: (61.62%); Female: (41.06 %)
- Website: quetta.balochistan.gov.pk

Quetta Division is an administrative division of Balochistan Province, Pakistan, being the third tier of government. CNIC Code of Quetta Division is 54.

In 2015, the Balochistan Assembly unanimously passed a resolution calling upon the provincial government to establish a new Rakhshan Division comprising the districts of Nushki, Chagai, Kharan, and Washuk which were parts of Quetta and Kalat.

== History ==
The Quetta Division, comprising present-day Quetta, Pishin, Killa Abdullah, and Chaman districts, historically formed part of the Shal uplands and functioned as a frontier zone linking southern Afghanistan with northern Balochistan. The region was inhabited predominantly by Pashtun tribes, including the Kasi, Tareen, Achakzai, and Kakar, who controlled agricultural land, mountain passes, and trade routes connecting Kandahar with the Bolan Pass and the Indus plains.

On 14 October 1955, Quetta was created as an administration division of Balochistan Province.

== List of the Districts ==
#	District	Headquarter	Area (km²)	Population (2023)	Density (ppl/km²) (2023)	Lit. rate (2023)
1	Quetta East					
2	Quetta West					
3	Quetta	Quetta	3,447	2,595,492	754.3	56.29%
4	Mastung	Mastung	3,553	361,971	102.3	36.40%

== List of the Tehsils ==
#	Tehsil	Area (km²)	Population (2023)	Density (ppl/km²) (2023)	Literacy rate (2023)	Districts
1	Barshore Tehsil	2,288	141,994	62.06		Pishin
2	Hurramzai Tehsil	418	147,844	353.69		Pishin
3	Pishin Tehsil	1,199	325,641	271.59		Pishin
4	Saranan Tehsil	83	65,157	785.02		Pishin
5	Bostan Tehsil	186	49,721	267.32		Pishin
6	Chiltan Tehsil					Quetta
7	Zarghoon Tehsil					Quetta
8	Panjpai Tehsil	1,205	21,371	17.74		Quetta
9	Sadar Tehsil	1,283	330,421	257.54		Quetta
10	Kuchlak Tehsil	180	310,246	1,723.59		Quetta
11	Sariab Tehsil	221	572,854	2,592.10		Quetta
12	Gulistan Tehsil	1,536	126,474	82.34		Qila Abdullah
13	Killa Abdullah Tehsil	413	165,738	401.30		Qila Abdullah
14	Dobandi Tehsil	1,604	69,759	43.49		Qila Abdullah
15	Karezat Tehsil	1,240	59,756	48.19		Karezat
16	Khanozai Tehsil					Karezat

== Constituencies ==
Provincial Assembly Constituency	National Assembly Constituency	District
PB-38 Quetta-I	NA-262 Quetta-I	Quetta
PB-39 Quetta-II	NA-262 Quetta-I	Quetta
PB-40 Quetta-III	NA-262 Quetta-I	Quetta
PB-43 Quetta-VI	NA-263 Quetta-II	Quetta
PB-44 Quetta-VII	NA-263 Quetta-II	Quetta
PB-45 Quetta-VIII	NA-263 Quetta-II	Quetta
PB-41 Quetta-IV	NA-264 Quetta-III	Quetta
PB-42 Quetta-V	NA-264 Quetta-III	Quetta
PB-46 Quetta-IX	NA-264 Quetta-III	Quetta
PB-47 Pishin-I	NA-265 Pishin	Pishin
PB-48 Pishin-II	NA-265 Pishin	Pishin
PB-49 Pishin-II	NA-265 Pishin	Pishin
PB-50 Killa Abdullah	NA-266 Killa Abdullah-cum-Chaman	Killa Abdullah
PB-51 Chaman	NA-266 Killa Abdullah-cum-Chaman	Chaman

== Demographics ==
=== Population ===
Historical population
Year	Pop.	±% p.a.
1951	...	—
1961	...	—
1972	...	—
1981	880,618	—
1998	1,699,957	+3.94%
2017	4,174,562	+4.84%
2023	4,259,163	+0.33%

Languages of Quetta Division (2023 census)
1. Pashto (75.3%)
2. Brahui (9.40%)
3. Balochi (4.50%)
4. Punjabi (1.80%)
5. Urdu (1.60%)
6. Sindhi (0.80%)
7. Saraiki (0.70%)
8. Hindko (0.50%)
9. Others (6.40%)

According to the 2023 census, Quetta division had a population of 4,259,163 roughly equal to the country of Georgia or the US state of Kentucky.

== See also ==
- Districts of Pakistan
  - Districts of Balochistan
- List of tehsils of Pakistan
  - Tehsils of Balochistan
- Divisions of Pakistan
  - Divisions of Balochistan
  - Divisions of Khyber Pakhtunkhwa
  - Divisions of Punjab
  - Divisions of Sindh
  - Divisions of Azad Kashmir
  - Divisions of Gilgit-Baltistan
