= Brewery Tehsil =

Tehsil in Balochistan, Pakistan

Brewery Tehsil is an administrative subdivision of Quetta West District, in the Balochistan province of Pakistan. It was created on 8 July 2026, alongside Panjpai Tehsil, as part of a notification by the Balochistan government's Revenue Department that bifurcated Quetta district into Quetta East and Quetta West districts. Along with Kuchlak Tehsil, Brewery and Panjpai together make up Quetta West District.

== History ==
On 8 July 2026, the Balochistan government issued a notification splitting Quetta district along the city's railway line, in a broader restructuring intended to improve governance across the province. Quetta was divided into two new districts, Quetta East and Quetta West, with Brewery established as a new tehsil under Quetta West.
