= List of districts in Balochistan =

Districts of Balochistan, Pakistan

Districts of Balochistan, Pakistan
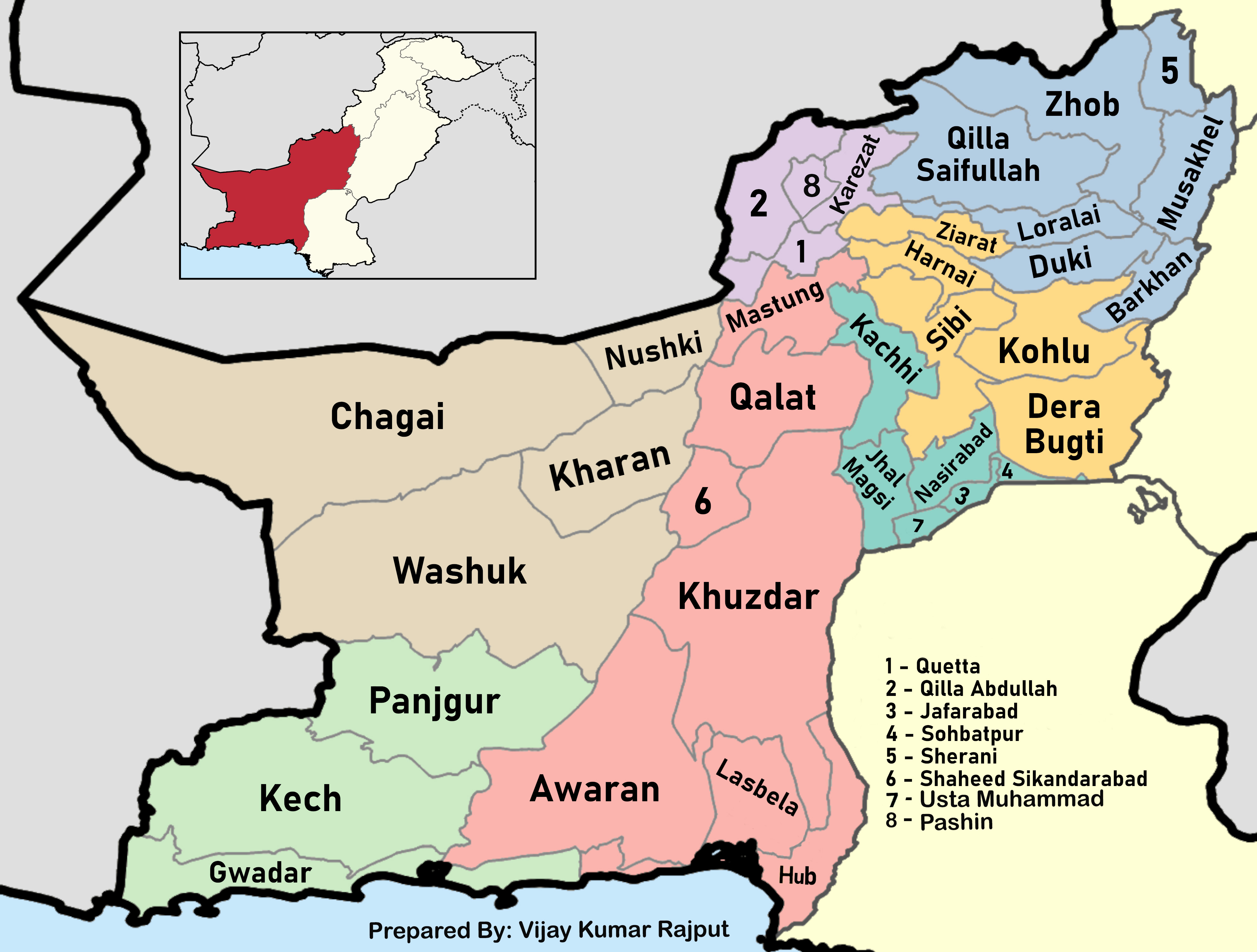
- Location: Balochistan, Pakistan
- Number: 42 (as of March 2026)
- Populations: 97,017 (Harnai District) – 2,275,699 (Quetta District)
- Government: District Government; City District Government; Zilla Council
- Subdivisions: Tehsils

The province of Balochistan is the least populated province of Pakistan and the largest province by area, is divided into 40 districts and ten divisions.

== History ==
=== Colonial times ===
==== 1877–1901 ====
The area which covers the modern-day Pakistani province of Balochistan was first introduced to districts and divisions as administrative units under the British, and the area was first incorporated into British India in 1877. The first census of the Balochistan region was held in 1891, but it only covered the parts of Balochistan east of the 66th meridian east, was incomplete, and never had a report written about it. The first full census that was completed and had a report written on it took place in 1901. By 1901, Balochistan was divided into both the Baluchistan Agency and the Chief Commissioner's Province of Baluchistan, which was also more commonly known as British Baluchistan.

In 1901, British Baluchistan consisted principally of the areas which were under the control of Afghans, but were ceded to the British with the Treaty of Gandamak in 1879, and were formally declared British India in 1887. It was divided into two districts: Thal-Chotiali District, which consisted of the Tehsils of Duki, Shahrig (Shahrug), and Sibi, and Quetta-Pishin District, which was subdivided into Pishin Tehsil, Chaman Subdivision, and Shorarud Sub-Division. The administration given below:

British Balochistan Province

- Thal-Chotiali District
1. Duki tehsil
2. Shahrig (Shahrug) tehsil
3. Sibi tehsil
- Quetta-Pishin District
1. Pishin Tehsil
2. Chaman Subdivision
3. Shorarud Sub-Division

Balochistan Agency

- Native States
1. Khan of Kalat
2. Kharan State
3. Las bela State
4. Makran State
- British Agencies
1. Bolan Agency
2. Chagai Agency
3. Quetta-Pishin Agency
4. Thal-Chotiali Agency
5. Zhob Agency
- Tribal Areas
1. Bugti Country
2. Marri Country

The Baluchistan Agency was split into three divisions: The areas directly administered by the British, the Native States, and the Tribal Areas.

The areas directly administered by the British consisted of the Bolan Agency, the Chagai Agency (which consisted of Chagai, Nushki, and Western Sinjrani), the Quetta-Pishin Agency (which consisted of Quetta Tehsil excluding Shorarud), the Thal-Chotiali Agency (made of the Barkhan Tehsil, the Kohlu Sub-Tehsil, and the Sanjawi (Sinjawi) Sub-Tehsil), and the Zhob Agency (which included Fort Sandeman, Hindobagh, Loralai, Musakhel, and Qilla Saifullah Tehsils).

There were four autonomous princely states, making up the native states, in Balochistan: The state of Kharan (which was a vassal of Qalat), The state of Las Bela, The state of Makran, and the Khanate of Qalat (which was divided into Domki, Kaheri, and Umrani Country; Jhalawan Country; Kachhi Country; Nasirabad Niabat; and Sarawan Country).

The two tribal areas were Bugti Country and Marri Country. The tribal areas consisted of Baloch tribes which, as per the census report of 1901, exhibited "nomadic tendency to the largest degree".

This meant that the administrative setup of the Balochistan region under British control was as follows in 1901:

===== Territories which do not exist anymore =====
- British Baluchistan
    - Quetta-Pishin District
    - Thal-Chotiali District
- Baluchistan Agency
    - Quetta-Pishin Agency
    - Thal-Chotiali Agency
    - Bolan Agency
    - Chagai Agency
    - Zhob Agency
- Tribal Areas
    - Bugti Country
    - Marri Country
- Native Princely States
    - State of Makrann
    - Kharan (princely state)
    - Las Bela (princely state)
    - Khanate of Qalat

==== 1901–1947 ====
By the time of the 1911 census, all the directly administered territories of the Baluchistan Agency had been abolished and reformed into districts in the Chief Commissioner's Province (British Baluchistan). Thal-Chotiali District was also abolished. In their place came the six districts of Bolan (previously Bolan Agency), Chagai (previously Chagai Agency), Loralai (previously parts of Thal-Chotiali District and Thal-Chotiali Agency), Quetta-Pishin (previously Quetta-Pishin District and Quetta-Pishin Agency), Sibi (previously parts of Thal-Chotiali District and Thal-Chotiali Agency), and Zhob (previously Zhob Agency). The two Tribal Areas of Bugti Country and Marri Country were also abolished as a separate unit and were made a part of Sibi District called Marri-Bugti Country (which became known the unadministered area of Sibi District, as opposed to the administered areas which covered parts of Thal-Chotiali District and Thal-Chotiali Agency).

No changes occurred to the administrative setup of the Native Princely States, which now made up the entire Baluchistan Agency until 1940, when the State of Kharan gained complete independence from the Khanate of Qalat. This did not, though, have any effect on the borders and administrative units of the borders themselves, as the State of Kharan already existed as an entity before. The only difference was now it was completely separate from Qalat.

This left the following administrative setup, which would see no changes through the 1921, 1931, and 1941 censuses, all the way until Pakistani independence:

===== Territories which do not exist anymore =====
- British Baluchistan
    - Quetta-Pishin District
    - Bolan District
    - Chagai District
    - Loralai District
    - Sibi District
    - Zhob District
- Unadmistration Areas of Sibi District
    - Marri-Bugti Country
- Native Princely States
    - State of Makran
    - Kharan (princely state)
    - Las Bela (princely state)
    - Khanate of Kalat

=== 1947–1955 ===
On 3 October 1952, the four princely states of Kalat, Kharan, Las Bela and Makran was merged to form Balochistan State Union with the capital at the town of Kalat.

==== Administration of Balochistan ====
- Quetta Division
    - Quetta-Pishin District
    - Bolan District
    - Chagai District
    - Loralai District
    - Sibi District
    - Zhob District
- Unadmistration Areas of Sibi District
    - Marri-Bugti Country
- Balochistan State Union
    - State of Makran
    - Kharan (princely state)
    - Las Bela (princely state)
    - Khanate of Kalat

On 14 October 1955, the Balochistan state union finally merged into Balochistan Province to form Kalat division and Marri-Bugti county abolished.

Administration is given below;

- Quetta Division
  - Quetta-Pishin District
  - Bolan District
  - Chagai District
  - Loralai District
  - Sibi District
  - Zhob District
- Kalat Division
  - Kalat District
  - Makran District
  - Kharan District
  - Lasbela District

==== 1955–1970 ====
In 30 September 1955, To diminish the differences between the two regions, claimed the government, the 'One Unit' programme merged the four provinces of West Pakistan into a single province to parallel the province of East Pakistan (now Bangladesh).

==== 1970–1998 ====
On 1 July 1970, West Pakistan was abolished and all four provinces of Pakistan were restored as 1947.

The administration as given below:

- Quetta Division
  - Quetta-Pashin District
  - Bolan District
  - Chagai District
  - Loralai District
  - Sibi District
  - Zhob District
- Kalat Division
  - Kalat District
  - Makran District
  - Kharan District

In 1974, Balochistan government create three new districts Khuzdar and Nasirabad District by bifurcation of Kalat District, Kohlu district from Sibi district and Sibi division created from Quetta division.

In 1975, Pishin District was separated from Quetta District and Lasbela district transferred from Karachi division to Kalat division(From 1970 to 1975 Lasbela district was a part of Sindh province).

On 1 July 1977, Makran was declared a division and was divided into three districts, named Panjgur, Turbat and Gwadar.

In July 1983, Dera Bugti was established as a separate district .

In 1986, Ziarat District was established, previously being part of Sibi District.

In 1987, Jafarabad was notified a district.district’s headquarters are at Dera Allah Yar, also known as Jhatpat among locals and Nasirabad division created by bifurcation of Sibi division.

In 1988, Killa Saifullah District was established as a district by bifurcation of Zhob District and Zhob division established after bifurcating of Quetta division.

In December 1991, Mastung creation as a separate district from Kalat District and Barkhan district from Loralai district.

In December 1991, Bolan district divided into two districts – Kachhi and Jhal Magsi districts.

In 11 November 1992, Awaran District was created as a separate district from Khuzdar District and Musakhail district from Loralai district.

In June 1993, Kila Abdullah was separated from Pishin District and made a new district.

In 1994–95, the name of Turbat district was changed to its old name Kech.

The administration as given below:

- Quetta Division
  - Quetta District
  - Pashin District
  - Killa Abdullah District
  - Chagai District
- Zhob Division
  - Zhob District
  - Killa Saifullah District
  - Musakhel District
  - Loralai District
  - Barkhan District
- Kalat Division
  - Kalat District
  - Khuzdar District
  - Awaran District
  - Kharan District
  - Lasbela District
  - Mustang District
- Sibi Division
  - Sibi District
  - Kohlu District
  - Dera Bugti District
  - Ziarat District
- Nasirabad Division
  - Nasirabad District
  - Jhal Magsi District (Formally Bolan)
  - Kachhi District(Formally New Bolan)
  - Jafarabad District
- Makran Division
  - Kech (Turbat) District
  - Gwadar District
  - Punjgur District

==== 1998–2017 ====
At the time of the 1998 Census of Pakistan, Balochistan had 26 districts, but since then, the province has created 12 new districts and abolished 01 district.

In 2004, Nushki was separated from Chaghai and made a district.

In 2005, the tehsil of Washuk received district status after splitting off from the district of Kharan, and became Washuk District.

Sherani District was established 3 January 2006 by the bifurcation of Zhob district.

In 2007, Harnai district would be created by splitting the Sibi district.

In 2013, two new districts were created Lehri district created by splitting of Sibi District and Sohbatpur District created by splitting of Jafarabad district.

In 2016, Duki district created.

In 2017, Surab District creation as a separate district, Surab was part of Kalat District and Rakhshan division established after bifurcating of Kalat and Quetta division.

The administration as given below:

- Quetta Division
  - Quetta District
  - Pashin District
  - Killa Abdullah District
- Zhob Division
  - Zhob District
  - Killa Saifullah District
  - Musakhel District
  - Loralai District
  - Barkhan District
  - Sherani District
  - Duki District
- Kalat Division
  - Kalat District
  - Khuzdar District
  - Awaran District
  - Lasbela District
  - Mustang District
  - Surab District (Sikanderabad)
- Sibi Division
  - Sibi District
  - Kohlu District
  - Dera Bugti District
  - Ziarat District
  - Harnai District
  - Lehri District
- Nasirabad Division
  - Nasirabad District
  - Jhal Magsi District
  - Kachhi District
  - Jafarabad District
  - Sohbatpur District
- Makran Division
  - Kech (Turbat) District
  - Gwadar District
  - Punjgur District
- Rakhshan Division
  - Kharan District
  - Chagai District
  - Nushki District
  - Washuk District

==== 2018–2022 ====
In 2018, Balochistan Cabinet abolished or reannexed Lehri district into Sibi district.

In 2021, Chaman District is created after bifurcating Qila Abdullah District and Loralai division was created after bifurcating of Zhob division.

In 2022, Balochistan Cabinet created 3 new districts Hub district from Lasbela, Usta Muhammad district from Jafarabad and Karezat district from Pishin district.

The administration as given below:

- Quetta Division
  - Quetta District
  - Pashin District
  - Killa Abdullah District
  - Chaman District
- Zhob Division
  - Zhob District
  - Killa Saifullah District
  - Sherani District
- Loralai Division
  - Loralai District
  - Musakhel District
  - Barkhan District
  - Duki District
- Kalat Division
  - Kalat District
  - Khuzdar District
  - Awaran District
  - Lasbela District
  - Hub District
  - Mustang District
  - Surab District (Sikanderabad)
- Sibi Division
  - Sibi District
  - Kohlu District
  - Dera Bugti District
  - Ziarat District
  - Harnai District
- Nasirabad Division
  - Nasirabad District
  - Jhal Magsi District
  - Kachhi District
  - Jafarabad District
  - Sohbatpur District
  - Usta Muhammad District
- Makran Division
  - Kech (Turbat) District
  - Gwadar District
  - Punjgur District
- Rakhshan Division
  - Kharan District
  - Chagai District
  - Nushki District
  - Washuk District

==== 2026–present ====
In January 2026, the Government of Balochistan introduced major administrative reforms. Pishin and Koh-e-Sulaiman were established as new divisions. Tump (from Kech) and Upper Dera Bugti (from Dera Bugti) were created as new districts. In addition, Mustang District was shifted from Kalat Division to Quetta Division, and Quetta District was divided into Quetta City and Quetta Saddar districts to improve administrative management.. In May 2026 The Balochistan cabinet approved a major redrawing of the province's administrative map. The changes establish 3 new districts and 1 new division, bringing the total counts to 42 districts and 11 divisions, Taftan District separated from Chagai, with Nokundi and Mashkel included in its jurisdiction. Wadh District upgraded to district status comprising Ornach and Nal, with Wadh as its headquarters. Quetta East & West: The provincial capital of Quetta was split into two distinct districts. Newly approved Lasbela Division bifurcation of former Kalat Division, encompassing Hub, Lasbela, and Awaran districts. Kalat Division has been renamed to Khuzdar Division. Sibi Division has been renamed Sui Division. Boundary shifts Zohri tehsil was merged into Surab from Khuzdar district, Ziarat was moved to Loralai Division and Kachhi was shifted to Sui Division.

The administration as given below:

- Quetta Division
  - Quetta East District (from Quetta 2026)
  - Quetta West District (From Quetta 2026)
  - Mastung District (Excl from Kalat Division)
- Pashin Division (Newly created 2026)
  - Pashin District
  - Killa Abdullah District
  - Chaman District
  - Barshor District (Carved from Pashin 2026)
- Zhob Division
  - Zhob District
  - Killa Saifullah District
  - Sherani District
  - Musakhel District
- Loralai Division
  - Loralai District
  - Duki District
  - Ziarat District (Excl from Loralai Division)
- Kalat Division
  - Kalat District
  - Khuzdar District
  - Surab District (Sikanderabad)
  - Wadh District (carved from Khuzdar 2026)
- Sui Division (Former Sibi renamed 2026)
  - Sibi District
  - Kachhi District (Excl Nasirabad Division)
  - Harnai District
  - Dera Bugti District
- Koh e Sulaiman Division (Created 2026)
  - Upper Dera Bugti District (created 2026)
  - Barkhan District (Excl Loralai Division)
  - Kohlu District (Excl Sibi Division)
- Nasirabad Division
  - Nasirabad District
  - Jhal Magsi District
  - Jafarabad District
  - Sohbatpur District
  - Usta Muhammad District
- Makran Division
  - Kech (Turbat) District
  - Gwadar District
  - Punjgur District
  - Tump District (carved from Kach 2026)
- Rakhshan Division
  - Kharan District
  - Chagai District
  - Nushki District
  - Washuk District
  - Taftan District (carved from Chagai and Washuk 2026)
- Lasbela Division (carved from former Kalat 2026)
  - Awaran District
  - Hub District
  - Lasbela District

== List of all districts by population, area, density, literacy rate etc. ==
| District | Capital | Area (km^{2}) (2023) | Population (2023) | Density (people/km^{2}) (2023) | Literacy rate (2023) | HDI (2023) | Division |
|---|---|---|---|---|---|---|---|
| Kalat | Kalat | 7,654 | 272,506 | 35.6 | 39.97% | | Khuzdar |
| Surab | Surab | 4,783 | 429,966 | 89.8 | 43.41% | | Khuzdar |
| Wadh | Wadh | 17,355 | 381,599 | 21.9 | 51.07% | | Khuzdar |
| Khuzdar | Khuzdar | 10,747 | 428,037 | 39.8 | 36.40% | | Khuzdar |
| Awaran | Awaran | 29,510 | 178,958 | 6.0 | 39.97% | | Lasbela |
| Hub | Hub | 6,716 | 382,885 | 57.0 | 51.07% | | Lasbela |
| Lasbela | Lasbela | 11,694 | 334,472 | 28.6 | 36.40% | | Lasbela |
| Chaman | Chaman | 1,341 | 466,218 | 347.7 | 39.97% | | Pishin |
| Pishin | Pishin | 6,218 | 835,482 | 134.6 | 51.07% | | Pishin |
| Barshore | Barshore | 2,288 | 141,994 | 62.06 | 37.61% | | Pishin |
| Qila Abdullah | Jungle Pir Alizai | 3,553 | 361,971 | 102.3 | 36.40% | | Pishin |
| Quetta East | Quetta | 3,447 | 2,595,492 | 754.3 | 56.29% | | Quetta |
| Quetta West | Quetta | 3,308 | 313,271 | 94.7 | 35.97% | | Quetta |
| Mastung | Mastung | 5,896 | 313,271 | 94.7 | 35.97% | | Quetta |
| Sohbatpur | Sohbatpur | 802 | 240,106 | 299.6 | 41.02% | | Nasirabad |
| Nasirabad | Dera Murad Jamali | 3,387 | 563,315 | 166.1 | 28.96% | | Nasirabad |
| Usta Muhammad | Usta Muhammad | 953 | 292,060 | 280 | 35.53% | | Nasirabad |
| Jafarabad | Dera Allahyar | 690 | 302498 | 361.1 | 35.53 % | | Nasirabad |
| Jhal Magsi | Gandava | 3,615 | 203,368 | 56.2 | 30.14% | | Nasirabad |
| Chagai | Dalbandin | 19,338 | 219,308 | 11.3 | 33.15% | | Rakhshan |
| Washuk | Washuk | 21,430 | 247038 | 9.1 | 21.58% | | Rakhshan |
| Western Chagai | Nokkundi | 37,073 | 105,469 | 2.8 | 41.07% | | Rakhshan |
| Kharan | Kharan | 14,958 | 260,352 | 17.4 | 41.07% | | Rakhshan |
| Nushki | Nushki | 5,797 | 207,834 | 35.9 | 57.12% | | Rakhshan |
| Harnai | Harnai | 3,301 | 189,535 | 57.4 | 43.37% | | Sibi |
| Dera Bugti | Dera Bugti | 3,839 | 190,191 | 30.0 | 25.9% | | Sibi |
| Sibi | Sibi | 7,121 | 224,148 | 31.5 | 47.41% | | Sibi |
| Kacchi | Dhadar | 5,682 | 442,674 | 77.9 | 30.2% | | Sibi |
| Kohlu | Kohlu | 7,610 | 260,220 | 34.2 | 28.53% | | Koh e Sulaiman |
| Upper Dera Bugti | Baiker | 6,321 | 165,083 | 30.0 | 25.9% | | Koh e Sulaiman |
| Barkhan | Barkhan | 3,514 | 210,249 | 59.83 | 33.62% | | Koh e Sulaiman |
| Loralai | Loralai | 3,785 | 398,832 | 105.4 | 54.16% | | Loralai |
| Ziarat | Ziarat | 3,301 | 189,535 | 57.4 | 43.37% | | Loralai |
| Musakhel | Musakhel | 5,728 | 182,275 | 31.82 | 36.60% | | Loralai |
| Duki | Duki, Pakistan | 4,233 | 205,044 | 48.44 | 44.18% | | Loralai |
| Panjgur | Panjgur | 16,891 | 509,781 | 30.18 | 42.07% | | Makran |
| Gwadar | Gwadar | 12,637 | 305,160 | 24.14 | 50.30% | | Makran |
| Kech | Turbat | 19,138 | 857,118 | 44.78 | 49.65% | | Makran |
| Tump | Tump | 3,401 | 203/813 | 59.92 | 51.0% | | Makran |
| Zhob | Zhob | 15,987 | 355,692 | 22.2 | 36.62% | | Zhob |
| Killa Saifullah | Killa Saifullah | 6,831 | 380,200 | 55.7 | 32.96% | | Zhob |
| Sherani | Sherani | 4,310 | 191,687 | 44.5 | 23.86% | | Zhob |

Former district

- Lehri District abolished in 2018.
- Karezat-Barshore District created on 21 November 2022, on 22 November Barshore tehsil minus from karezat-barshore District and barshore tehsil merge again in Pishin district Later on 29 November 2022 Balochistan Government Abolished Karezat District.

== List of all districts by population over the years ==
| District | Capital | Pop. (2023) | Pop. (2017) | Pop.(1998) | Pop.(1981) | Pop.(1972) | Pop.(1961) | Pop.(1951) | Division |
|---|---|---|---|---|---|---|---|---|---|
| Awaran | Awaran | 178,958 | 121,821 | 118,173 | 110,353 | 51,918 | 31,893 | ... | Khuzdar |
| Hub | Hub | 382,885 | 339,640 | 163,194 | 73,256 | 49,094 | 31,075 | ... | Khuzdar |
| Lasbela | Uthal | 680,977 | 576,271 | 312,695 | 188,139 | 125,263 | 82,997 | 68,189 | Khuzdar |
| Surab | Surab | 279,038 | 200,857 | 93,401 | 94,720 | 21,738 | 8,636 | ... | Khuzdar |
| Mastung | Mastung | 313,271 | 265,676 | 150,039 | 130,207 | 74,690 | 33,718 | ... | Khuzdar |
| Khuzdar | Khuzdar | 997,214 | 798,896 | 417,466 | 276,449 | 146,207 | 71,214 | ... | Khuzdar |
| Kalat | Kalat | 271,560 | 211,201 | 144,433 | ... | ... | ... | ... | Khuzdar |
| Chaman | Chaman | 466,218 | 434,561 | 151,854 | 68,848 | 47,692 | 26,087 | ... | Quetta |
| Pishin | Pishin | 835,482 | 736,903 | 376,728 | 202,256 | 131,923 | 58,957 | ... | Quetta |
| Barshore | Barshore | ... | | | | | | | Quetta |
| Quetta | Quetta | 2,595,492 | 2,269,473 | 774,547 | 383,403 | 252,577 | 142,137 | 199,735 | Quetta |
| Qila Abdullah | Qila Abdullah | 361,971 | 323,793 | 208,870 | ... | ... | ... | ... | Quetta |
| Sohbatpur | Sohbatpur | 240,106 | 200,426 | 141,527 | ... | ... | ... | ... | Nasirabad |
| Nasirabad | Dera Murad Jamali | 563,315 | 487,847 | 245,894 | 129,112 | 43,893 | 21,458 | ... | Nasirabad |
| Usta Muhammad | Usta Muhammad | 292,060 | 260,865 | 160,230 | 107,139 | 74,316 | 47,697 | ... | Nasirabad |
| Jafarabad | Dera Allahyar | 594,558 | 513,972 | 291,290 | ... | ... | ... | ... | Nasirabad |
| Jhal Magsi | Jhal Magsi | 203,368 | 148,900 | 109,941 | 68,092 | 75,261 | 53,031 | ... | Nasirabad |
| Kachhi | Dhadar | 442,674 | 309,932 | 255,480 | 200,863 | 123,720 | 93,858 | ... | Nasirabad |
| Chagai | Chagai | 269,192 | 226,517 | 104,534 | 63,713 | 34,034 | 21,414 | 32,807 | Rakhshan |
| Washuk | Washuk | 302,623 | 175,712 | 110,009 | ... | ... | ... | ... | Rakhshan |
| Kharan | Kharan | 260,352 | 162,766 | 96,900 | ... | ... | ... | ... | Rakhshan |
| Nushki | Nushki | 207,834 | 178,947 | 98,030 | 56,742 | 31,261 | 19,849 | ... | Rakhshan |
| Ziarat | Ziarat | 189,535 | 160,095 | 80,748 | 63,179 | 37,688 | 15,853 | ... | Sibi |
| Harnai | Harnai | 127,571 | 97,052 | 76,652 | ... | ... | ... | ... | Sibi |
| Kohlu | Kohlu | 260,220 | 213,933 | 99,846 | 71,269 | 55,497 | 28,101 | ... | Sibi |
| Dera Bugti | Dera Bugti | 355,274 | 313,110 | 181,310 | 103,821 | 52,718 | 32,049 | ... | Sibi |
| Sibi | Sibi | 224,148 | 179,751 | 136,322 | ... | ... | ... | ... | Sibi |
| Barkhan | Barkhan | 268,249 | 171,025 | 103,545 | 61,686 | 44,704 | 29,756 | ... | Loralai |
| Duki | Duki | 289,044 | 152,977 | 115,976 | ... | ... | ... | ... | Loralai |
| Musakhel | Musa Khel Bazar | 196,275 | 167,243 | 134,056 | 91,174 | 38,547 | 24,320 | ... | Loralai |
| Loralai | Loralai | 398,832 | 272,098 | 91,450 | 27,482 | 15,157 | 10,519 | ... | Loralai |
| Panjgur | Panjgur | 509,781 | 315,353 | 234,051 | 160,750 | 56,820 | 27,228 | 29,560 | Makran |
| Gwadar | Gwadar | 305,160 | 262,253 | 185,498 | 112,385 | 90,820 | 49,661 | 40,630 | Makran |
| Tump | Tump | 201.421 | 212,421 | 1711,401 | 101,241 | 71,901 | 47,101 | 40,721 | Makran |
| Kech | Turbat | 1,060,931 | 907,182 | 413,204 | 379,467 | 147,978 | 70,326 | 83,631 | Makran |
| Zhob | Zhob | 355,692 | 310,354 | 193,458 | 134,660 | 74,519 | 39,755 | ... | Zhob |
| Qila Saifullah | Qilla Saifullah | 380,200 | 342,932 | 193,553 | 148,362 | 72,086 | 37,577 | ... | Zhob |
| Sherani | Sherani | 191,687 | 152,952 | 81,684 | 78,625 | 25,384 | 10,354 | ... | Zhob |

== See also ==
- List of districts of Balochistan by language and ethnicity
- Tehsils in Pakistan
  - Tehsils of Balochistan
  - Tehsils of Punjab, Pakistan
  - Tehsils of Khyber Pakhtunkhwa
  - Tehsils of Sindh, Pakistan
  - Tehsils of Azad Kashmir
  - Tehsils of Gilgit-Baltistan
- Districts of Pakistan
  - Districts of Khyber Pakhtunkhwa
  - Districts of Sindh, Pakistan
  - Districts of Punjab, Pakistan
  - Districts of Azad Kashmir
  - Districts of Gilgit-Baltistan
- Divisions of Pakistan
  - Divisions of Balochistan
