= Kuchlak Tehsil =

Tehsil in Balochistan, Pakistan

Kuchlak Tehsil is an administrative subdivision (tehsil) of Quetta West District, in the Balochistan province of Pakistan. It is named after the town of Kuchlak, also spelled Kuchlagh, which lies near the city of Quetta.

Unlike the neighbouring Brewery Tehsil, which was newly created in 2026, Kuchlak existed as one of the constituent tehsils of the former, undivided Quetta District prior to the restructuring, and was retained under the newly formed Quetta West District rather than established anew.

== History ==
Before the 2026 restructuring, Quetta District comprised six tehsils: Chiltan, Zarghoon, Panjpai, Saddar, Kuchlak, and Sariab. On 8 July 2026, the Balochistan government's Revenue Department issued a notification splitting the district along the city's railway line as part of a wider provincial restructuring. Quetta was divided into two new districts, Quetta East and Quetta West, with Kuchlak Tehsil placed under Quetta West District alongside the newly established Brewery and Panjpai tehsils.

== Geography and economy ==
The town of Kuchlak is known for its summer fruit orchards, particularly apples and peaches, along with vegetable cultivation, including tomatoes, potatoes, onions, and turnips, although arid soil conditions constrain agricultural output in parts of the area.
