= Aghbarg =

- Location within Pakistan
- Coordinates: 30.49°N 67.20°E
- Country: Pakistan
- Province: Balochistan
- Time zone: UTC+5 (PST)

Aghbarg is a town and union council of Quetta District in the Balochistan province of Pakistan. It lies to the north-east of the district capital Quetta, and has an altitude of 2,056 m (6,745 ft).
