= Jungle Pir Alizai =

Jungle Piralizai جنگل پیر علی زئی
- Village
- Location within Balochistan, Pakistan
- Coordinates: 30°38′08.7″N 66°42′40.9″E
- Country: Pakistan
- Province: Balochistan
- Division: Quetta
- District: Killa Abdullah District

Jungle Piralizai is a village of Killa Abdullah District in the Balochistan province of Pakistan. It is located 60 km to the northwest of provincial capital Quetta and 14.7 km from Killa Abdullah, and is about 2.26 km from the main Quetta-Chaman Highway.

== Name ==
The name "Jungle" is derived from the vast plantation of salt cedar (Tamarix ramosissima ) shrub or small tree typically growing 6-15’ tall that were planted there post independence by the British Forces at that time to camouflage the military airstrip that was built near to, what is now Khamat Killi (remnants of which can still be seen adjacent to this village). This habitation of Salt cedar trees were uprooted and totally destroyed by the Afghan refugees (that camped on the outskirts of these villages during the Soviet invasion of Afghanistan) in need of wood for fire to protect themselves from the harsh winter nights, whereas the bricks and stones used in the construction of the airstrip and its buildings were removed over the years and used by the villagers and the refugees in their homes. A portion of these salt cedar trees has survived near to Khamat Killi and is pruned every year to make wood for fire during winter.

== Villages ==
Jungle Piralizai is composed of four villages – Qutub Killi, Khojdad Killi, Majeryaan/Momin Killi and Khamat Killi including Shamir Killi (nickname Nika Killi). Jungle Piralizai is a part of other Piralizai villages located to the north 15 km away and comprises three villages: Arambi, Shah Killi, Killi Usman Achakzai (called "Shom"). Piralizai villages are headed by Malik Fareed Ahmad Khan Achakzai who was elected Malik (meaning elder of the tribe) after the demise of Malik Mohammad Yousuf. The Piralizais are an ethnic group belonging to the Pashtun sub-tribe Achakzai. Members of this group usually use Piralizai or Achakzai as their title or last name. Piralizai's are the descendants of the Durrani, Zirak and Achakzai tribes.

== Inhabitants ==
The inhabitants of Jungle Piralizai are mostly farmers and shop keepers, whereas some travel to large cities in search of employment. The people lead a simple and hard life. A bit of development work has been done due to which there is a middle school plus one madrassah located in Qutub Killi. A government hospital, veterinary hospital and girls' school are under construction. Jungle Piralizai was home to more than a 100,000 Afghan refugees during the Soviet invasion of Afghanistan in 1979, that had camped on the outskirts of the village close to the main Quetta Chaman Highway. Presently, the refugee camp is still existent but the number of refugees has by far dwindled to a minimal size, as most of them either migrated back to Afghanistan or to other cities in Pakistan in search of better living standards.

In the past, Jungle Piralizai consisted of a small number of houses with no proper roads, water or electricity, hospital except one primary school built during the times of President Ayub Khan. Wheat was grown annually and people lived a life of hardships. Drinking water was salty and scarce. There were no health facilities and people travelled on donkey to the main Quetta Chaman highway, waiting for hours to take a bus to Quetta to address their medical needs. The only road available was built by the British that linked Quetta to Chaman bordering Afghanistan. People never ventured after dark and lit fires to keep themselves warm. Many attended to their herds of camels, goats and sheep and cared less about the outside world.

== Food ==
Their staple diet included handmade bread (Dodi), boiled meat (Shorwa) and butter milk (Sholumbay). Landi, dried meat, is commonly used during winter. It is generally made of mutton or goat meat. Sheep are specially fattened and slaughtered. The animal is thoroughly cleaned and then it is salted and some special ingredients are rubbed in it. The animal is hanged and exposed to the air and is ready for use after one month. When required for eating, it is boiled for 5 hours in an earthen pot over a slow fire. It is normally eaten when it is extremely cold.

Tea especially green (Shnay chai) was and is still taken during winter and black tea (slaymani chai) during the summer. The majority of the male population wear turban, shalwar and kameez, both in winter and summer. A Patu (piece of cloth) is always lying on their shoulders in both seasons. Women wear a long dress with beautiful embroidery on the bosom, sleeves and edges of the dress usually hand made. They also wear a shawl over their heads as they observe purdah. The women in particular knit their hair in thin plaits and added a gum base to stick them together. This basic style of the dress is changing, with the spread of development and growing prosperity, dresses have become somewhat modernised. Women usually weave caps with beautiful embroidery on them for their male folk and also plait beautiful naras or nadas (string used for tying the shalwar) woven with wool and colorful threads which are given at times of Eid. Eggs are also collected by the women folk which are boiled and colored and given to children and youngsters for Eid festivities. With the passage of time, these small villages grow into larger ones, bringing changes in the lives and improving the way of living of the people.
