= Sariab Tehsil =

Sariab Tehsil is an administrative subdivision (tehsil) of Quetta East District, located in the Balochistan province of Pakistan.

== History ==
=== 2026 Bifurcation ===
On July 8, 2026, the Balochistan government issued a notification splitting the district along the railway line to improve governance.

Quetta was bifurcated into two districts namely Quetta East and Quetta West.
