= Kechi Beg railway station =

Railway station in Pakistan

General information
- Coordinates: 30.1291°N 66.9730°E
- Owner: Ministry of Railways

Other information
- Station code: KFB

History
- Former names: Great Indian Peninsula Railway
Location

Kechi Beg railway station (Urdu: کچی بیگ ریلوے اسٹیشن) is located in the Quetta District of Pakistan.

== See also ==
- List of railway stations in Pakistan
- Pakistan Railways
