= Hanna Valley =

Hanna Valley Shal Tungi, وادیِ ہنہ Hanna Urak, Hannah Gorge
- Valley
- Location within Balochistan, Pakistan Location within Pakistan
- Coordinates: 30°10′52″N 67°01′59″E
- Country: Pakistan
- Province: Balochistan
- District: Quetta District
- Time zone: UTC+5 (PST)

Hanna Valley (Urdu: وادیِ ہنہ), also locally known as Shal Tungi, is a valley in Balochistan, Pakistan at a distance of 7 miles (11 kilometres) from Quetta. The people living here mostly are Kakars. Hanna Lake is located in the center of this valley.
