= Zarghoon Tehsil =

Zarghoon Tehsil is an administrative subdivision (tehsil) of Quetta West District, located in the Balochistan province of Pakistan.
