= Muhammad Hamza Shafqaat =

Pakistani politician and civil servant

- محمد حمزہ شفقات

Commissioner Quetta Division
- In office September 2023 – 1st July 2025

Deputy Commissioner Islamabad
- In office July 2018 – April 2022
- Appointed by: Establishment Division, Pakistan

Personal details
- Born: 25 November 1981 (age 44) Islamabad, Pakistan
- Occupation: Civil servant, Pakistan Administrative Service

Muhammad Hamza Shafqaat (Urdu: محمد حمزہ شفقات; born 25 November 1981) is a Pakistani civil servant who serves in BS-20 grade as the Additional Chief Secretary (Home) in the Government of Balochistan. He belongs to the Pakistan Administrative Service.

== Early life and education ==
Hamza Shafqaat was born to Chaudhry Shafqaat Ahmed on November 25, 1981. He started his early schooling at Toddler's Academy Lahore, and later completed his O-levels and F.Sc. from Cadet College Hasan Abdal. He obtained his Bachelor's degree from the Ghulam Ishaq Khan Institute of Engineering Sciences and Technology (GIKI). He later completed his Master's and MPhil degrees in Public Policy and Public Administration from the National Defence University (NDU), Islamabad.

He is married to Pawan Bilour, and the couple has three children. He has also done two courses on wastewater management and innovation in public service. Muhammad Hamza Shafqaat holds a Master of Laws (LL.M.) in International Trade Law from the University of London. In 2025, he was selected from Pakistan to participate in the Rising Public Leaders Programme (RPLP) at the Blavatnik School of Government, University of Oxford. He also participated in the International Wastewater Congress held in Türkiye in 2013 and attended the Blue Ocean Strategy Programme in Malaysia in 2015.

== Career in civil service ==
Hamza Shafqaat qualified Central Superior Services exam in 2005. He got 38th position in Pakistan and was allocated to District Management Group (now Pakistan Administrative Service). He joined Pakistan Administrative Service on June 29, 2006. After successful completion of training at Civil Services Academy Lahore, he was posted in Sindh where he served for three years as assistant commissioner in Larkana, Sukkur and Ghotki. He has also served as additional deputy commissioner Islamabad, director Islamabad Metropolitan Corporation, deputy secretary Establishment Division during his career in civil service. He was posted as deputy commissioner Islamabad in July 2018.

Hamza Shafqaat was awarded achievement award in September 2020 for his performance, dedication and contributions during COVID-19 outbreak in Pakistan.

During his tenure as Commissioner of the Quetta Division (September 2023 – July 2025), Shafqaat spearheaded several major administrative and urban development initiatives aimed at improving city infrastructure and municipal administration. Acting as both Commissioner and Administrator of the Metropolitan Corporation Quetta, he introduced stringent property and traffic regulations under Section 63 of the Balochistan Local Government Act 2010 to regulate "Downtown" Quetta. These measures mandated commercial properties, private hospitals, and shopping malls to convert ground floors or basements into dedicated parking zones to systematically reduce urban congestion.

Shafqaat also oversaw extensive anti-encroachment campaigns across major commercial hubs—including Abdul Sattar Road, Archer Road, and Prince Road—converting high-traffic zones into "No Parking" channels to smoothen public transit. His administration accelerated several multi-billion rupee infrastructure upgrades under the Public-Private Partnership Authority (PPPA), including the construction of the Western Bypass Road (stretching from Hazarganji to Quetta Airport), the Spini Road Dental College and Hospital, and the Karkhasa Monitoring Wall water-supply framework designed to provide clean water to over 100,000 residents across the Brewery, Subzal, and Faiz Town localities.

=== Deputy Commissioner of Islamabad (2018–2022) ===
During his tenure as Deputy Commissioner of Islamabad from 2018 to 2022, Shafqaat introduced several digital governance and administrative reforms. Under his administration, the ICT Administration launched the "City Islamabad" mobile application, which digitalized key public services, including vehicle registration, domicile issuance, international driving permits, and token tax payments, raising excise tax collection from PKR 4 billion to PKR 11 billion. He established two modern facilitation centers at Tarlai and Bhara Kahu, as well as Pakistan's first Property Verification Center.

To manage urban expansion and counter land-grabbing, Shafqaat led city-wide anti-encroachment drives that recovered 25,000 kanals of state land, retrieved land belonging to Quaid-e-Azam University, and took action against illegal housing schemes. His administration executed 386 rural development projects worth over PKR 4.7 billion, focusing on rural road rehabilitation and sanitation. During the COVID-19 pandemic, he coordinated the establishment of quarantine centers and enforced health protocols, leading to Islamabad being recognized nationally as a highly secure city in pandemic management. Additionally, his social initiatives included establishing five Panahgahs (shelters), setting up the first transgender madrassah in Meher Abadi, banning plastic bags in urban areas, and initiating a stray dog Trap, Neuter, Vaccinate, and Release (TNVR) program.

=== Administrative Roles in Balochistan (2023–2025) ===
Shafqaat's administrative tenure in Balochistan included serving as the Commissioner of Quetta Division and playing a key role in provincial security and policy reforms. Acting as both Commissioner and Administrator of the Metropolitan Corporation Quetta, he implemented traffic and property regulations under the Balochistan Local Government Act 2010 to reduce downtown congestion, mandating commercial properties to convert basements into parking zones. He also oversaw extensive anti-encroachment operations along high-traffic commercial zones like Abdul Sattar Road and Prince Road. Under the Public-Private Partnership Authority (PPPA), his administration managed infrastructure projects, including the Western Bypass Road, the Spini Road Dental College, and the Karkhasa Monitoring Wall water supply scheme.

In the policy and legislative domain, his tenure in Balochistan was marked by key contributions to security governance and legislative reforms. This included facilitating the provincial implementation of the National Action Plan, the conversion of "B Areas" to "A Areas" for uniform policing, and the drafting or strengthening of frameworks such as the Witness Protection Act, the establishment of Detention Centers under the Anti-Terrorism Act, and the creation of Special Courts for Overseas Pakistanis. Under his policy oversight, the Home Department initiated the digitization of arms licenses and local/domicile systems. He also coordinated inter-agency anti-illegal spectrum cells targeting smuggling and human trafficking, as well as overseen repatriation programs.
