= Barshore =

Pakistani administrative area

District Barshore ضلع برشور ضلع برښور
- District of Balochistan
- District Barshore
- Country: Pakistan
- Province: Balochistan
- Division: Pishin
- Established: 12th March, 2026
- Type: District Administration

Population
  - Total: 142,000

Barshore, (Pashto: برښار, برښور), (Urdu: برشور), is a district in Balochistan, Pakistan. The town of Barshore serves as the administrative headquarter of the district.

On 12th March 2026, after approval of Government of Balochistan, the Board of Revenue issued a notification for the creation of Barshore, a separate district of Balochistan. MPA Asfand Yar Khan Kakar has been instrumental in creating the District.

Flt Lt Khalid Shams, an officer of Pakistan Administrative Service, has been selected to establish the district and posted as its first Deputy Commissioner.

It covers an area of over 2,200 square kilometres. District Barshore is predominantly mountainous, with long, narrow valleys intersecting the terrain. At the northern end of the District, the great plateau of Toba Kakar Range drains northward to the Kadanai river in Afghanistan.

Area colored green represents District Bashore in the former Pishin District

== History ==
Karezat and Barshore tehsils were separated from Pishin in 2022 to form the newly created Karezat District. However, on 22 November 2022, Tehsil Barshore was removed from the newly created district and merged again in the district Pishin via a notification.

== Earthquakes and droughts ==
The most recent drought, which spanned nearly six years from 1998 to 2004, is regarded as one of the worst in the recorded history of Pishin. Barshore tehsil was severely impacted by this drought, while Pishin tehsil experienced moderate effects.

== Population ==
The Kakar tribe is the largest tribe in the Quetta and Pishin districts. When Quetta-Pishin was a single district, the 1901 census recorded 35,452 Kakars, making up 53% of the Afghan population and 42% of the total indigenous population. The Taragharai (or Taraghzai ) clan is numerically the strongest in these districts. Most Taraghzai Kakars live in Pishin District, particularly in the Barshore valley, Toba Kakari and Karezat.

In 1901, Barshore Tehsil had a population of around 13,000, with the Barakzai Kakars being the largest group at 6,643, followed by the Ahmadkhail Kakars at 3,077, and the Sulemankhail Kakars at 3,055. According to the 1998 census, Barshore's population had grown to 95,132.
