= Karezat =

- Tehsil
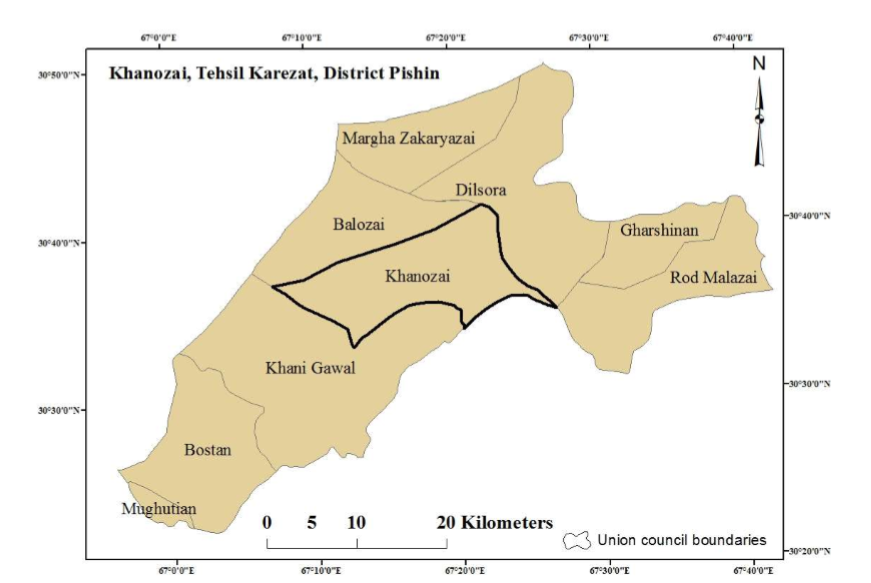
- Karezat Tehsil Map
- Coordinates: 28°10′42″N 68°2′35″E
- Country: Pakistan
- Province: Balochistan
- District: Karezat District

Area
  - Total: 978 km^{2} (378 sq mi)

Population (2017)
  - Total: 186,286
  - Density: 190/km^{2} (493/sq mi)
- Languages Spoken: Balochi, Pashto, Brahui, Saraiki

Karezat is a large tehsil of Karezat District. Karezat is in the north east of Pishin, Pakistan. In Karezat, the largest city is Khanozai Bazar.

Karezat is a tehsil and sub-division of the Karezat District of Balochistan Province, Pakistan.

The name Karezat refers to the karezes, underground channels with vertical access shafts, used to transport water from an aquifer under a hill, in the villages of the tehsil. Only Two karezes remains in the village Khushab, and the other is in Village Newkarez Murgha, all are no longer usable, due to drought.

It comprises many large villages which have large populations of the Kakar tribe; residents' livelihoods are based on agriculture. In early times, farms were irrigated by the karezes, which were the major source of water in the area.

== See also ==
- Tehsils in Pakistan
  - Tehsils of Balochistan
  - Tehsils of Punjab, Pakistan
  - Tehsils of Khyber Pakhtunkhwa
  - Tehsils of Sindh, Pakistan
  - Tehsils of Azad Kashmir
  - Tehsils of Gilgit-Baltistan
- Districts of Pakistan
  - Districts of Khyber Pakhtunkhwa
  - Districts of Punjab, Pakistan
  - Districts of Balochistan, Pakistan
  - Districts of Sindh, Pakistan
  - Districts of Azad Kashmir
  - Districts of Gilgit-Baltistan
- Divisions of Pakistan
  - Divisions of Balochistan
  - Divisions of Khyber Pakhtunkhwa
  - Divisions of Punjab, Pakistan
  - Divisions of Sindh
  - Divisions of Azad Kashmir
  - Divisions of Gilgit-Baltistan
