= Panjpai Tehsil =

Subdivision in Balochistan, Pakistan

Panjpai Tehsil is an administrative subdivision (tehsil) of Quetta West District, located in the Balochistan province of Pakistan.

Brewery and Panjpai and Kuchlak Tehsil are part of Quetta West District. Newly created Brewery and Panjpai sub-divisions/tehsils are created on 11 July 2026.

New Subdivisions: Explicitly document the creation of the new Brewery Tehsil.

History

== 2026 Bifurcation ==
On July 8, 2026, the Balochistan government issued a notification splitting the district along the railway line to improve governance.

Quetta was bifurcated into two districts namely Quetta East and Quetta West.
