= Quetta West District =

District in Balochistan, Pakistan

Quetta West District ضلع کوئٹہ مغربی کوئٹہ مغربی ضلع د کوټې لویدیځه ولسوالۍ ولسوالی کویته غرب
- District
- Country: Pakistan
- Province: Balochistan
- Division: Quetta Division
- Established: 8 July 2026
- Headquarters: Sariab (Irrigation Department building)
- Tehsils: Kuchlak Tehsil; Brewery Tehsil; Panjpai Tehsil

Quetta West District is an administrative district in Quetta Division, Balochistan, Pakistan, created on 8 July 2026 through the bifurcation of the former Quetta District. The district comprises Kuchlak Tehsil together with the newly created Brewery Tehsil and Panjpai Tehsil. Its administrative headquarters is located in the Irrigation Department building in Sariab.

== History ==
=== 2026 bifurcation ===
On 8 July 2026, the Balochistan government's Revenue Department issued a notification splitting Quetta district into two new districts along the city's railway line, as part of a broader provincial restructuring that increased the number of divisions in Balochistan from eight to eleven and the number of districts from thirty-six to forty-one. Quetta was divided into Quetta East, comprising the Saddar, City, and Sariab sub-divisions, and Quetta West, comprising Kuchlak together with the newly created Brewery and Panjpai sub-divisions. Quetta East retained the existing Deputy Commissioner's office as its headquarters, while a new Deputy Commissioner's office for Quetta West was established in the Irrigation Department building at Sariab.

As part of the same restructuring, Mastung district was detached from the former Kalat Division and placed under Quetta Division, which as a result came to comprise three districts: Quetta East, Quetta West, and Mastung.

Some Baloch and Pashtun political and tribal leaders publicly opposed the wider restructuring, describing the changes as politically motivated rather than administrative.
