= Quetta District =

District in Balochistan, Pakistan

Quetta District ضلع کوئٹہ کوئٹہ ضلع د کوټې ولسوالۍ ولسوالی کویته
- District
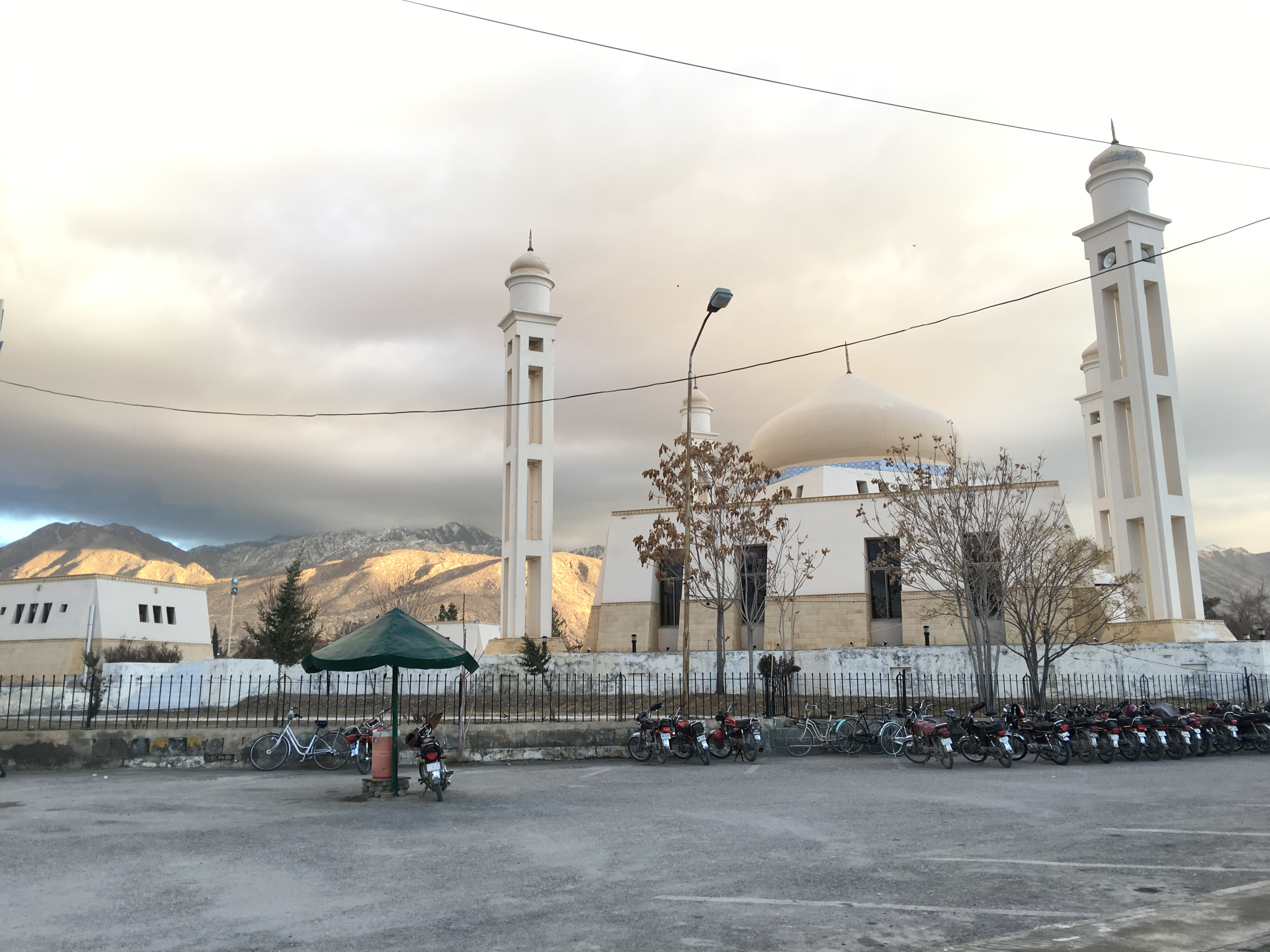
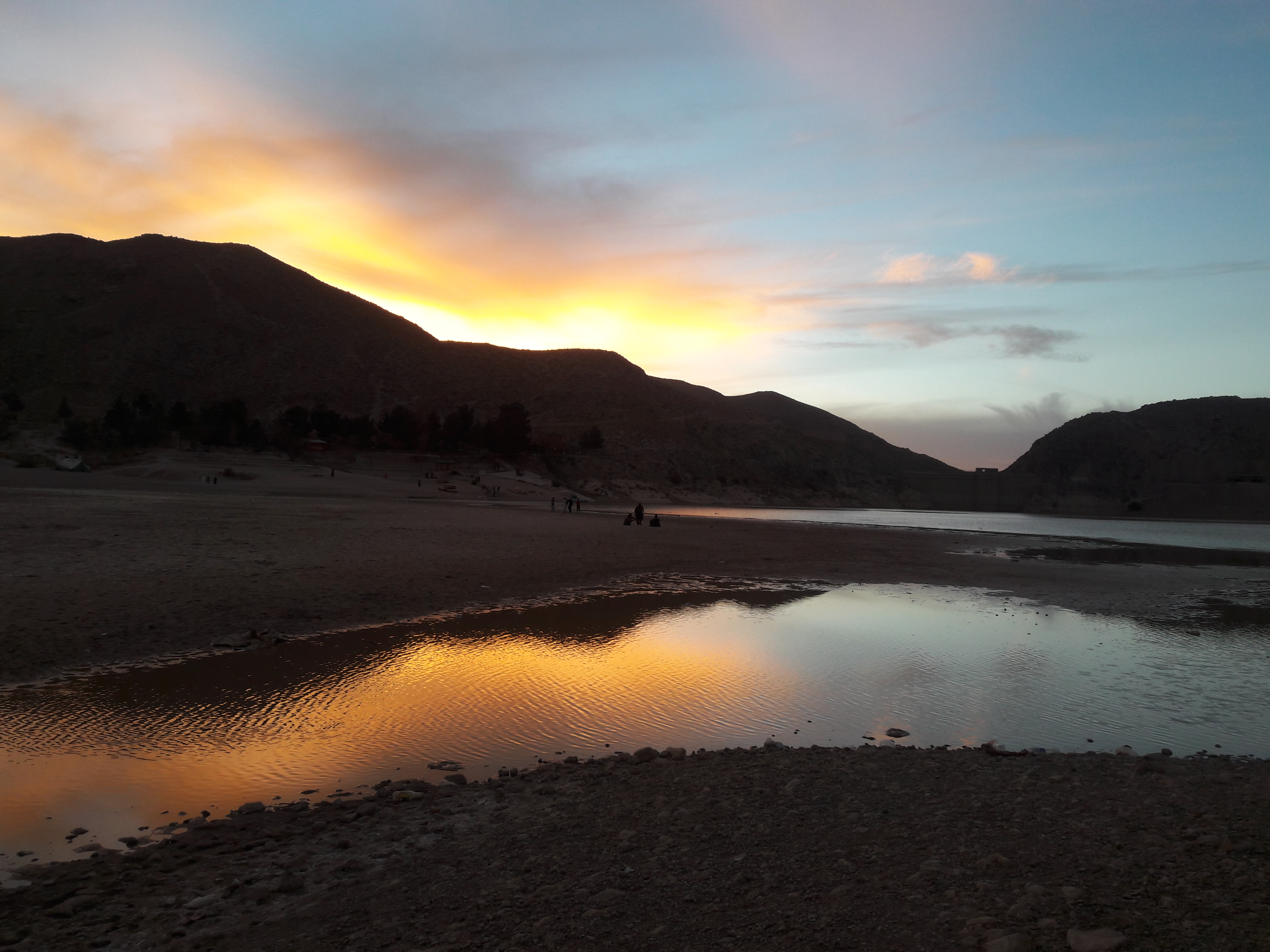
- Top: Bolan Mosque, Quetta; Bottom: Hanna Lake

- Map of Balochistan with Quetta District highlighted
- Coordinates: 30°10′N 67°00′E
- Country: Pakistan
- Province: Balochistan
- Division: Quetta
- Established: April 1983
- Administrative Headquarters: Quetta Metropolitan Corporation
- Administrative Towns: 5: Subdivision City Subdivision Kuchlak Subdivision Saddar Tehsil Subdivision Sariab Subdivision Panjpai

Government
  - Commissioner Quetta: Hamza Shafqaat
  - Deputy Commissioner: Lieutenant (R) Saad Bin Asad
  - Constituensy: NA-263 Quetta-II

Area
  - District: 3,447 km^{2} (1,331 sq mi)
- Elevation: 1,680 m (5,510 ft)

Population (2023)
  - District: 2,595,492
  - Density: 753.0/km^{2} (1,950/sq mi)
  - Urban: 1,565,546 (60.32%)
  - Rural: 1,029,946 (39.68%)

Literacy
  - Literacy rate: Total: (56.29%); Male: (65.06%); Female: (46.96%)
- Time zone: UTC+05:00 (PKT)
  - Summer (DST): DST is not observed
- ZIP Code: 87300
- NWD (area) code: 081
- ISO 3166 code: PK-BA
- CNIC Code of Quetta District: 54400
- Website: www.balochistan.gov.pk

Quetta was an administrative district in the northwestern part of the Balochistan province of Pakistan till 11 July 2026, when it was bifurcated into two districts namely Quetta East and Quetta West. According to the 2023 Pakistani census population of Quetta District is 2,272,290 (2.2 million).

The district, which was part of Quetta Division, was famous for its agriculture produce, most notably fruit orchards, including apples and grapes. The Hanna Valley is an area where almonds are grown. The population counted in the 1998 census was 760,000, while in 2010 it was estimated at 1,235,000, and in 2017 at 2,275,699.

== History ==
The ancient name of Quetta was Shalkot, a term by which it is still known among the people of the country. The district was held in turns by the Ghaznavids, Ghurids, and Mongols, and towards the end of the fifteenth century was conferred by the ruler of Herat on Shah Beg Arghun, who, however, had shortly to give way before the rising power of the Mughals. The Ain-i-Akbari mentions both Shal and Pishin as supplying military service and revenue to Akbar, however these areas passed with Kandahar to the Safavids. On the rise of the Khilji power in Kandahar at the beginning of the eighteenth century, simultaneously with that of the Baloch in Kalat, Quetta and Pishin became i to the hand of British with the treaty of durand.

=== British Era ===
During the 19th century Quetta (Shalkot) was captured by the British troops during the Second Anglo-Afghan War of 1879.

On the advance of the British Army of the Indus in 1839, Captain Bean was appointed the first Political Agent in Shalkot, and the country was managed by him on behalf of Shah Shuja-ul-mulk. After Sir Robert Sandeman's mission to Kalat in 1876, the Quetta Fort was occupied by his escort and the country was managed on behalf of the Khan of Kalat up to 1883, when it was leased to the British Government for an annual rent of Rs. 25,000 through a treaty between Khan and the British Empire. It was formed, with Pishin and Shorarud, into a single administrative charge in 1883. Up to 1888 Old Chaman was the most advanced post on the frontier; but, on the extension of the railroad across the Khwaja Amran, the terminus was fixed at its present site, 11 kilometres (7 mi) from that place. The boundary with Afghanistan was finally demarcated in 1895–1896.

The city area of Shalkot was inhabited by the Kasi tribe and the surroundings were occupied by the Bazai tribe with a few other nomads including the tribes of Sulaimankhail, Kharoti, Nasar, and Baitanai. Being on the outskirts of Kandahar, it was not much developed. With the arrival of British troops, doors of development were opened. Very soon, people saw roads, trains and schools in the area.

=== 2026 Bifurcation ===
On July 8, 2026, the Balochistan government issued a notification splitting the district along the railway line to improve governance.

== Administrative divisions ==
In April 1883 the district of Quetta was part of the larger Quetta-Pishin District when both areas came under British administration, however in 1975, Quetta and Pishin were made separate districts. Prior to the district being split, Quetta District consisted of two towns and one sub-tehsil. Quetta District was designated as a City District in 2001, having two tehsils and one sub-tehsil with a total of 67 union councils.

Tehsil	Area (km^{2})	Pop. (2023)	Density (ppl/km^{2}) (2023)	Literacy rate (2023)	Union Councils
Chiltan	558	1,360,600	2,438.35	63.97%	...
Zarghoon	...	...	...	...	...
Panjpai	1,205	21,371	17.74	37.67%	...
Quetta Sadar	1,283	330,421	257.54	56.66%	...
Kuchlak	180	310,246	1,723.59	50.59%	...
Sariab	221	572,854	2,592.10	42.99%	...

== Demographics ==
Historical population
Year	Pop.	±% p.a.
1951	N/A	—
1961	N/A	—
1972	N/A	—
1981	N/A	—
1998	774,547	—
2017	2,269,473	+5.82%
2023	2,595,492	+2.26%

=== Population ===
As of the 2023 census, Quetta district has 288,459 households and a population of 2,595,492. The district has a sex ratio of 103.48 males to 100 females and a literacy rate of 56.29%: 65.06% for males and 46.96% for females. 720,934 (31.74% of the surveyed population) are under 10 years of age. 1,565,546 (60.32%) live in urban areas.

In 1998, 74% of the population resided in urban areas.

=== Language ===
Languages of Quetta district (2023)
1. Pashto (60.0%)
2. Brahui (15.5%)
3. Balochi (7.38%)
4. Punjabi (2.95%)
5. Urdu (2.56%)
6. Sindhi (1.34%)
7. Saraiki (1.09%)
8. Hindko (0.82%)
9. Others (8.40%)

At the time of the 2023 census, 59.95% of the population spoke Pashto, 15.51% Brahui, 7.38% Balochi, 2.95% Punjabi, 2.56% Urdu, 1.34% Sindhi, 1.09% Saraiki and 0.82% Hindko as their first language. Around 200,000 speakers of 'Other' languages were recorded in the census, mainly Hazaragi.

=== Religion ===
Religions in Quetta district (2023)
Religion	Percent
Islam	99.95%
Christianity	0.05%

As per the 1998 census, the major religion was Islam (96%), but there were also Christian (2.7%) and Hindu (0.5%) communities.

In the 2023 census, Islam was the predominant religion at 99.95% of the population, while Christians were 0.05% of the population.

Religious groups in Quetta–Pishin District (British Baluchistan era)
Religious group	1901		1911		1921		1931		1941	
Religious group	Pop.	%	Pop.	%	Pop.	%	Pop.	%	Pop.	%
Islam	96,600	84.67%	106,702	83.59%	103,456	75.47%	107,945	73.16%	113,288	72.49%
Hinduism	11,752	10.3%	13,746	10.77%	22,300	16.27%	26,718	18.11%	28,629	18.32%
Christianity	3,743	3.28%	4,564	3.58%	6,139	4.48%	7,370	5%	5,441	3.48%
Sikhism	1,798	1.58%	2,430	1.9%	4,848	3.54%	5,255	3.56%	8,787	5.62%
Zoroastrianism	151	0.13%	137	0.11%	151	0.11%	161	0.11%	73	0.05%
Judaism	43	0.04%	47	0.04%	16	0.01%	15	0.01%	11	0.01%
Jainism	0	0%	9	0.01%	8	0.01%	32	0.02%	7	0%
Buddhism	—N/a	—N/a	12	0.01%	159	0.12%	40	0.03%	42	0.03%
Tribal	—N/a	—N/a	—N/a	—N/a	—N/a	—N/a	0	0%	0	0%
Others	0	0%	1	0%	5	0%	5	0%	11	0.01%
Total population	114,087	100%	127,648	100%	137,082	100%	147,541	100%	156,289	100%
Note: British Baluchistan era district borders are not an exact match in the present-day due to various bifurcations to district borders — which since created new districts — throughout the region during the post-independence era that have taken into account population increases.

== Bibliography ==
- 1981 District census report of Quetta. Vol. 2. Islamabad: Population Census Organization, Statistics Division, Government of Pakistan. 1983.
- 1998 District census report of Quetta. Census publication. Vol. 158. Islamabad: Population Census Organization, Statistics Division, Government of Pakistan. 2001.
- Planning & Development Department, Government of Balochistan (2011). Quetta District Development Profile (PDF) (Report).
