= Quetta East District =

Quetta East District is a district in the Balochistan province of Pakistan.

Quetta East District comprises Saddar, City, and Sariab sub-divisions.

Headquarters of Quetta East District is located at the existing Deputy Commissioner's Office.

== 2026 Bifurcation ==
On July 8, 2026, the Balochistan government issued a notification splitting the district along the railway line to improve governance.

Quetta was bifurcated into two districts namely Quetta East and Quetta West.
