= Balochistan, Pakistan =

Province of Pakistan

Balochistan بلوچستان
- Province
- Province of Balochistan
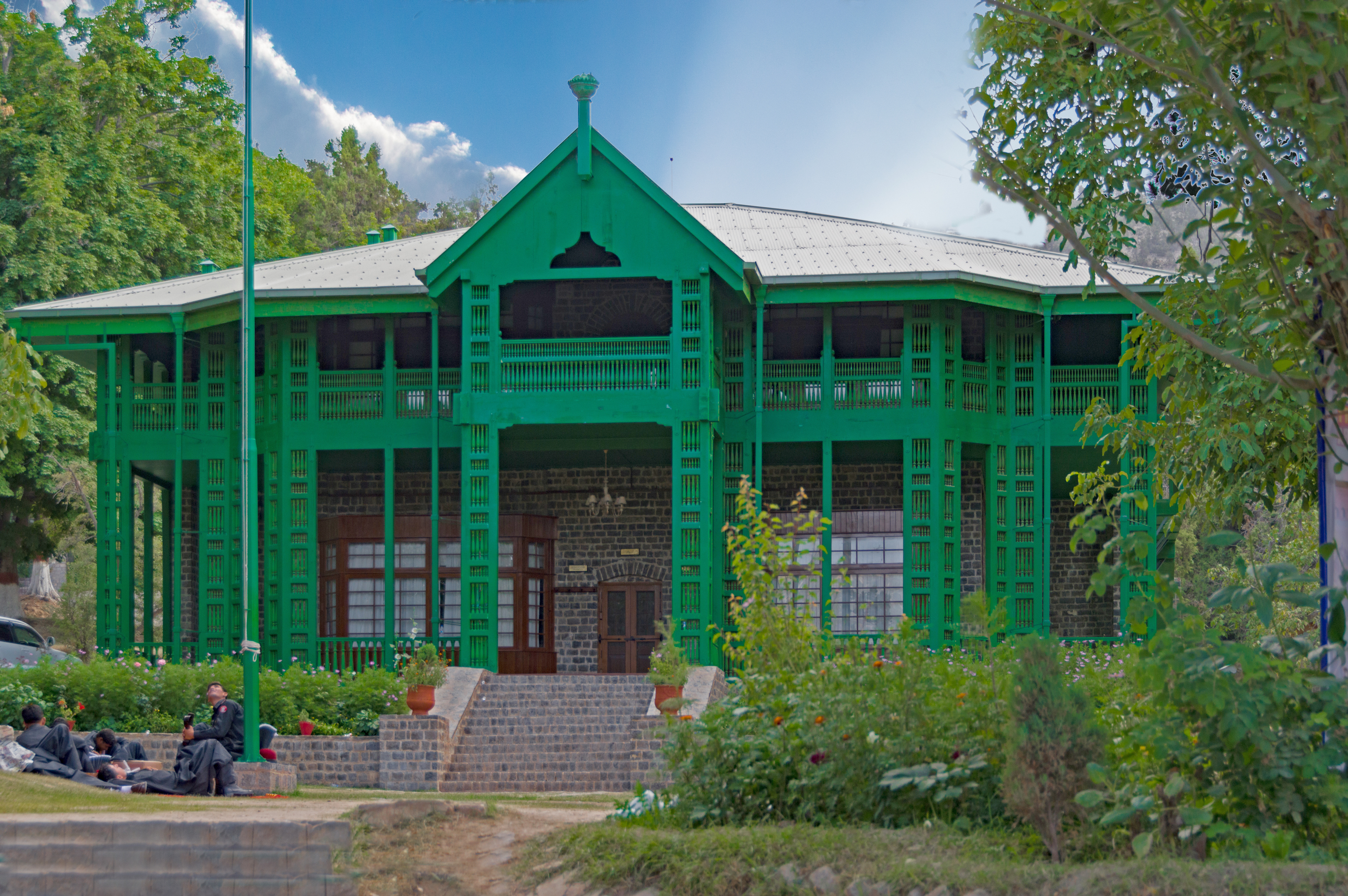
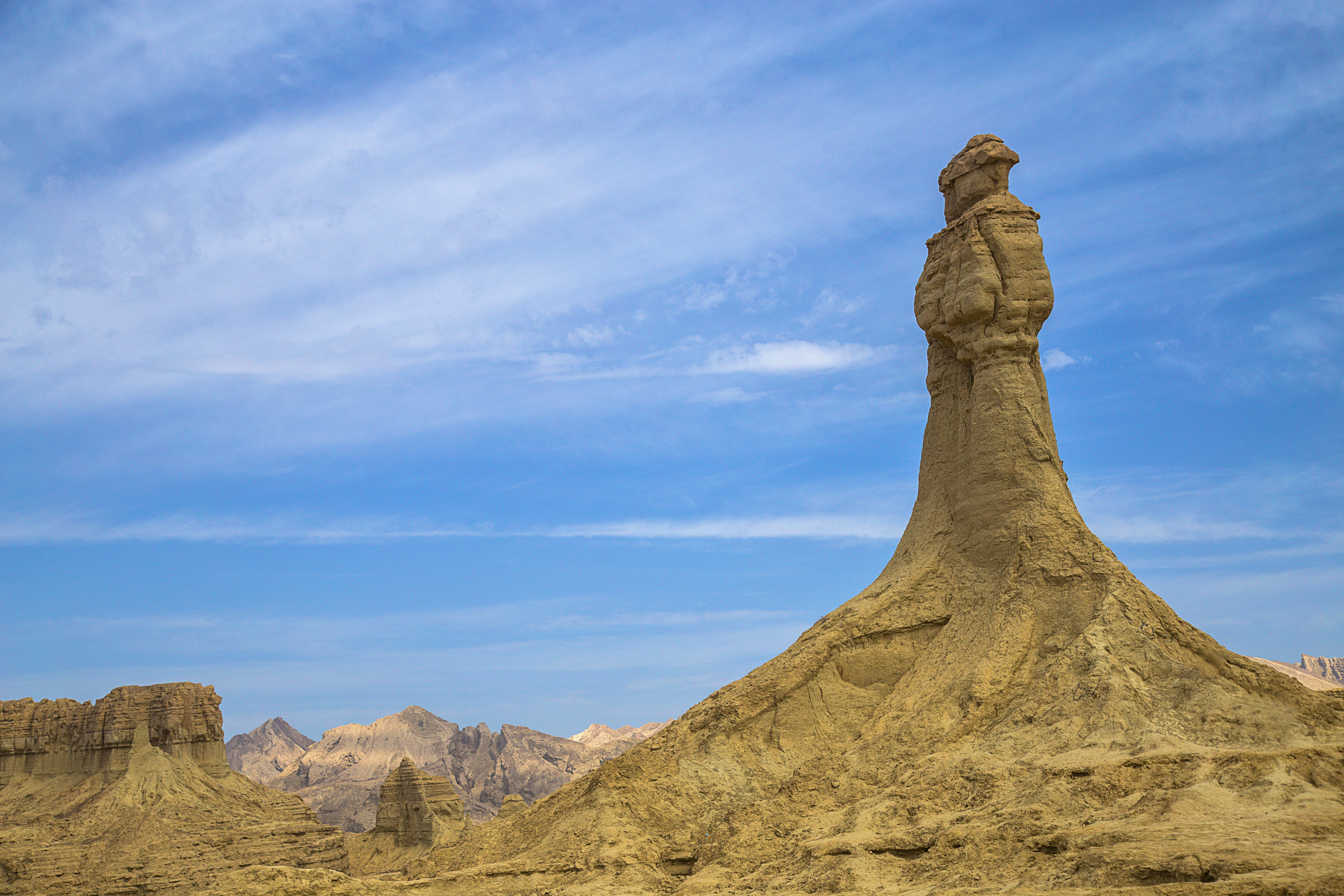
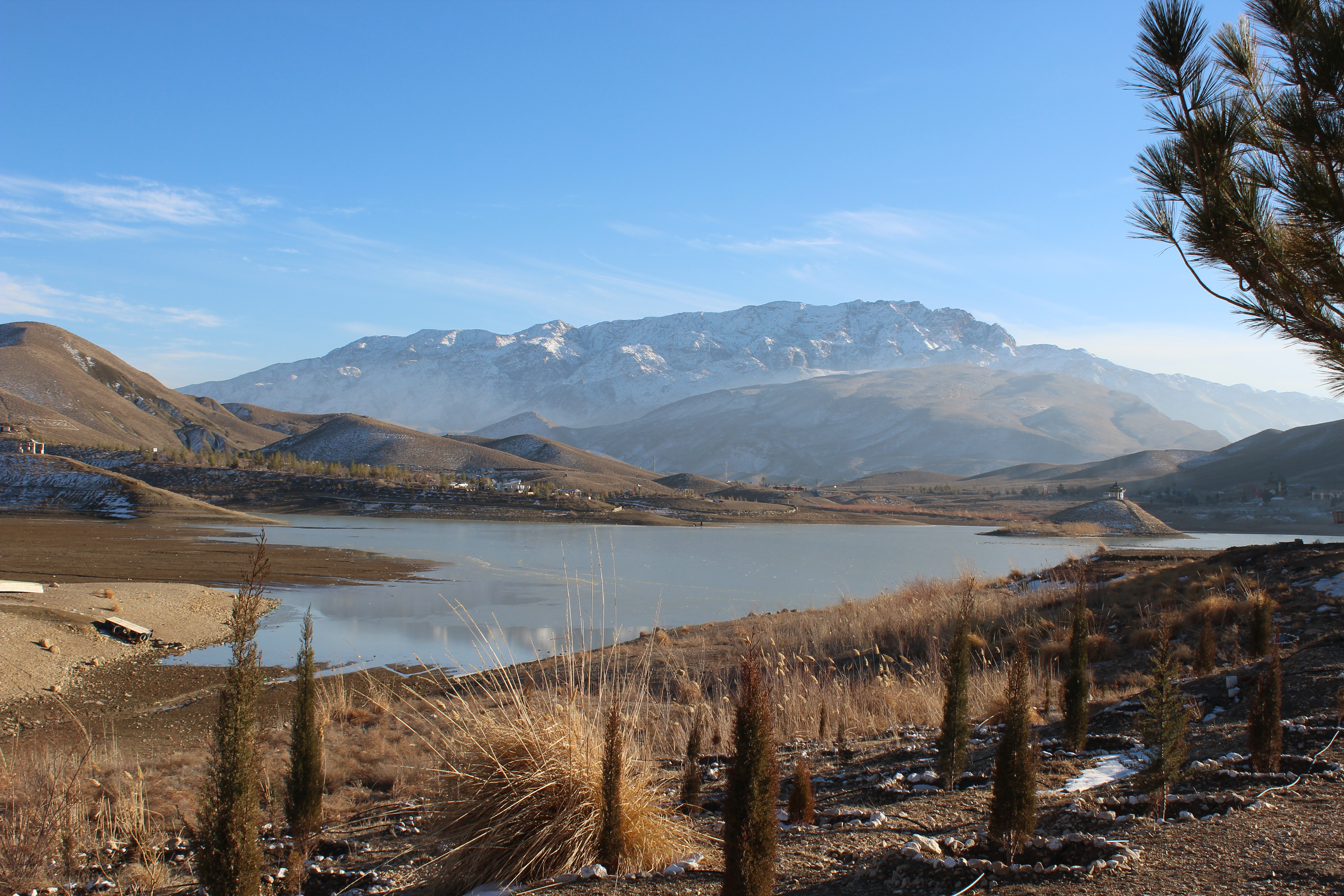
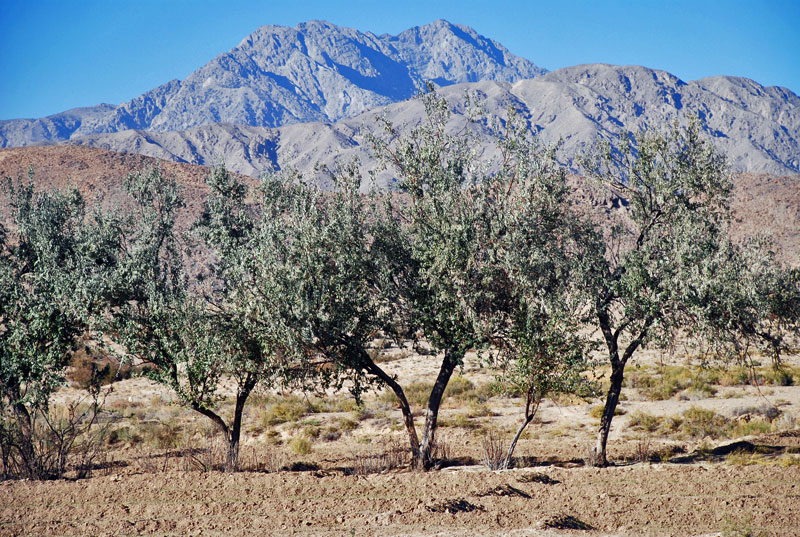
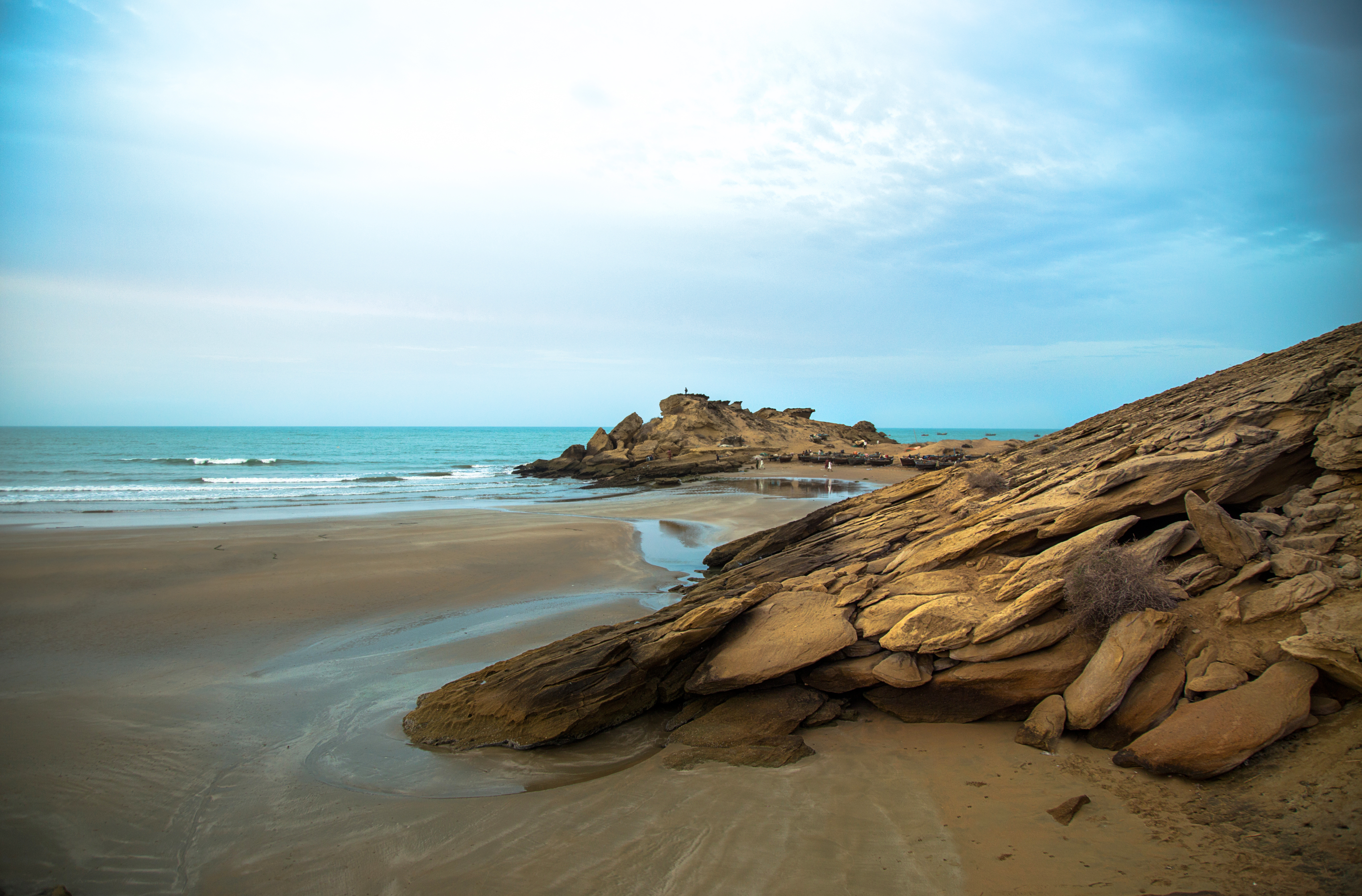
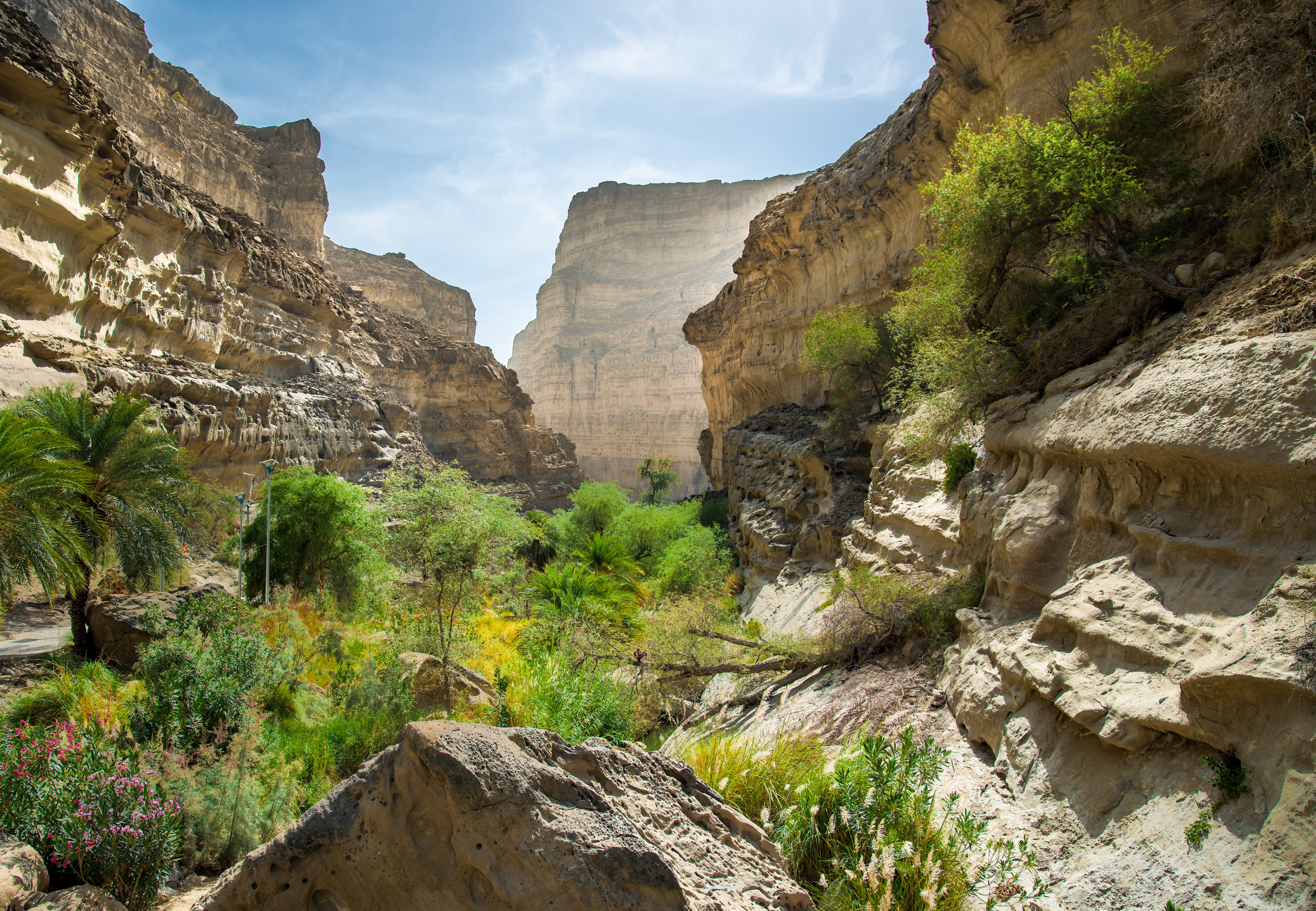
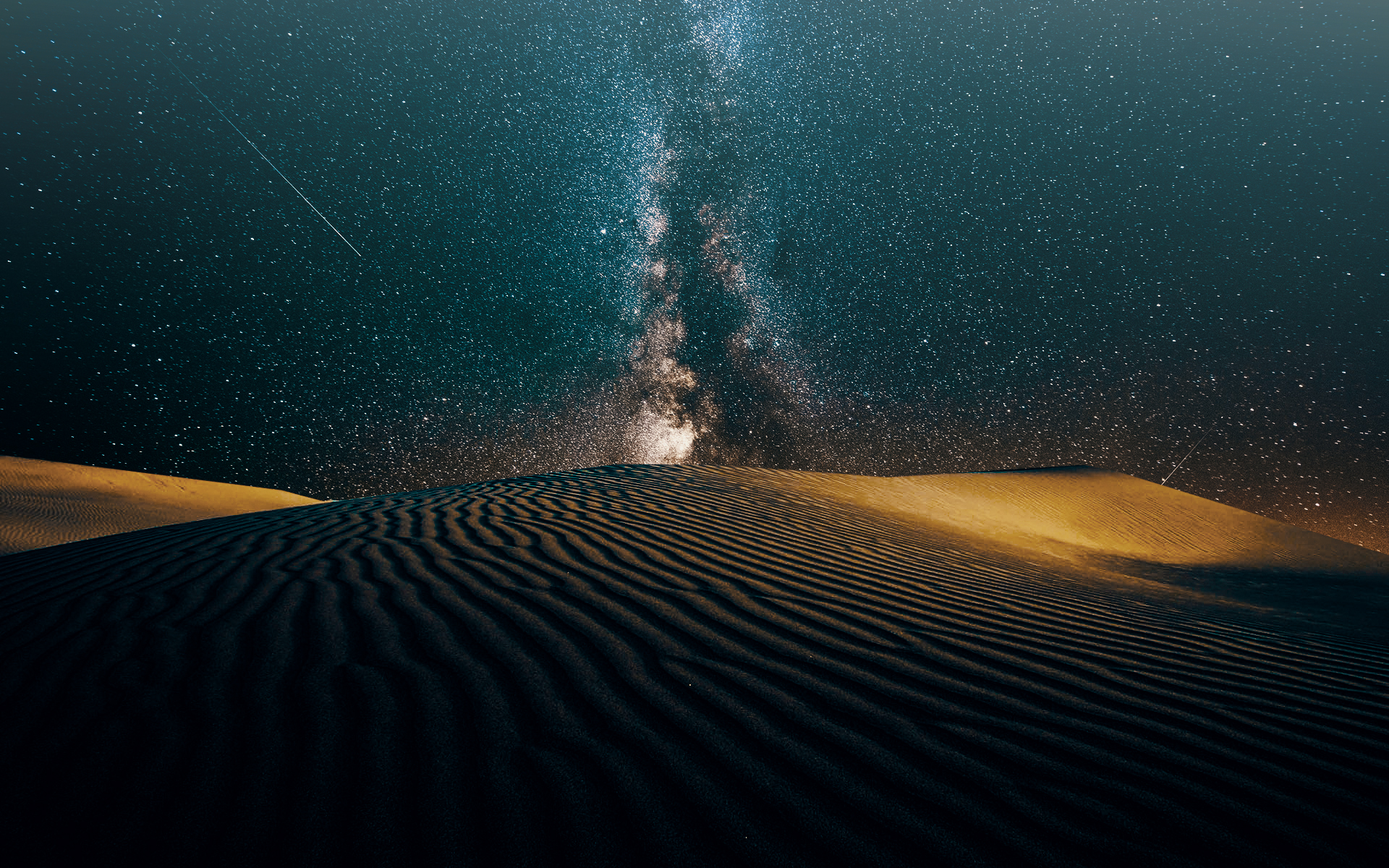
- Quaid-e-Azam Residency Princess of Hope Hanna Lake Koh-i-Chiltan Kund Malir Canyons of Balochistan Pasni

- Flag Seal

- Location of Balochistan in Pakistan
- Coordinates: 27.7°N 65.7°E
- Country: Pakistan
- Established: 1 July 1970
- Capital and largest city: Quetta

Government
  - Type: Federated parliamentary government
  - Body: Government of Balochistan
  - Governor: Sheikh Jaffar Khan Mandokhail
  - Chief Minister: Sarfraz Bugti
  - Chief Secretary: Shakeel Qadir Khan
  - Legislature: Provincial Assembly
  - High Court: Balochistan High Court

Area
  - Total: 347,190 km^{2} (134,050 sq mi)
  - Rank: 1st

Population (2023)
  - Total: 14,894,402
  - Rank: 4th
  - Density: 42.900/km^{2} (111.11/sq mi)

GDP (nominal)
  - Total (2022): $20 billion (4th) (Note: Balochistan's contribution to national economy was 5.33%, or $80 billion (PPP) and $20 billion (nominal) in 2022.)
  - Per Capita: $1,621 (5th)

GDP (PPP)
  - Total (2022): $80 billion (4th)
  - Per Capita: $6,485 (5th)
- Time zone: UTC+05:00 (PKT)
- ISO 3166 code: PK-BA
- Main language(s): Urdu, English (official); Spoken Languages: Balochi, Pashto, Brahui, Sindhi
- Notable sports teams: Quetta Gladiators; Quetta Bears; Balochistan cricket team
- HDI (2019): 0.475 ▲ low
- Literacy rate (2023): Total: (42.01%); Male: (50.50%); Female: (32.80%)
- Seats in National Assembly: 20
- Seats in Provincial Assembly: 65
- Divisions: 8
- Districts: 35
- Tehsils: 134
- Union Councils: 978
- Website: www.balochistan.gov.pk

Balochistan (/bəˈlɒtʃɪstɑːn, bəˌlɒtʃɪˈstɑːn, -stæn/) (Note: Balochi: بلۏچستان, romanised: Balòcestàn, Balochi pronunciation: [baˈloːt͡ʃest̪ɑːn];) Urdu: بلوچستان, romanised: Balocistān, Urdu pronunciation: [bəloːt͡ʃɪst̪ɑːn]) is a province of Pakistan. Located in the southwestern region of the country, Balochistan is the largest province of Pakistan by land area but is also the least populated. It is bordered by the Pakistani provinces of Khyber Pakhtunkhwa to the north-east, Punjab to the east, and Sindh to the southeast; shares international borders with Iran to the west and Afghanistan to the north; and is bound by the Arabian Sea to the south. Balochistan is an extensive plateau of rough terrain divided into basins by ranges of significant height and ruggedness. It has a large deep-sea port, Gwadar Port, lying in the Arabian Sea.

Although it constitutes approximately 44% of Pakistan's land area, only 5% of it is arable, and it is noted for an extremely dry desert climate. The agriculture and livestock make up about 47% of Balochistan's economy.

== Etymology ==
The name "Balochistan" means "the land of the Baloch people". The meaning of the ethnonym "Baloch" (also spelt Baluch) is unclear. Until the times of Arab conquests in the 7th century CE, Baloch people lived in Kerman in present-day Iran. They started migrating eastwards into Makran in what would later came to be known as Balochistan by the time of Seljuks in the 11th century.

== History ==
=== Ancient ===
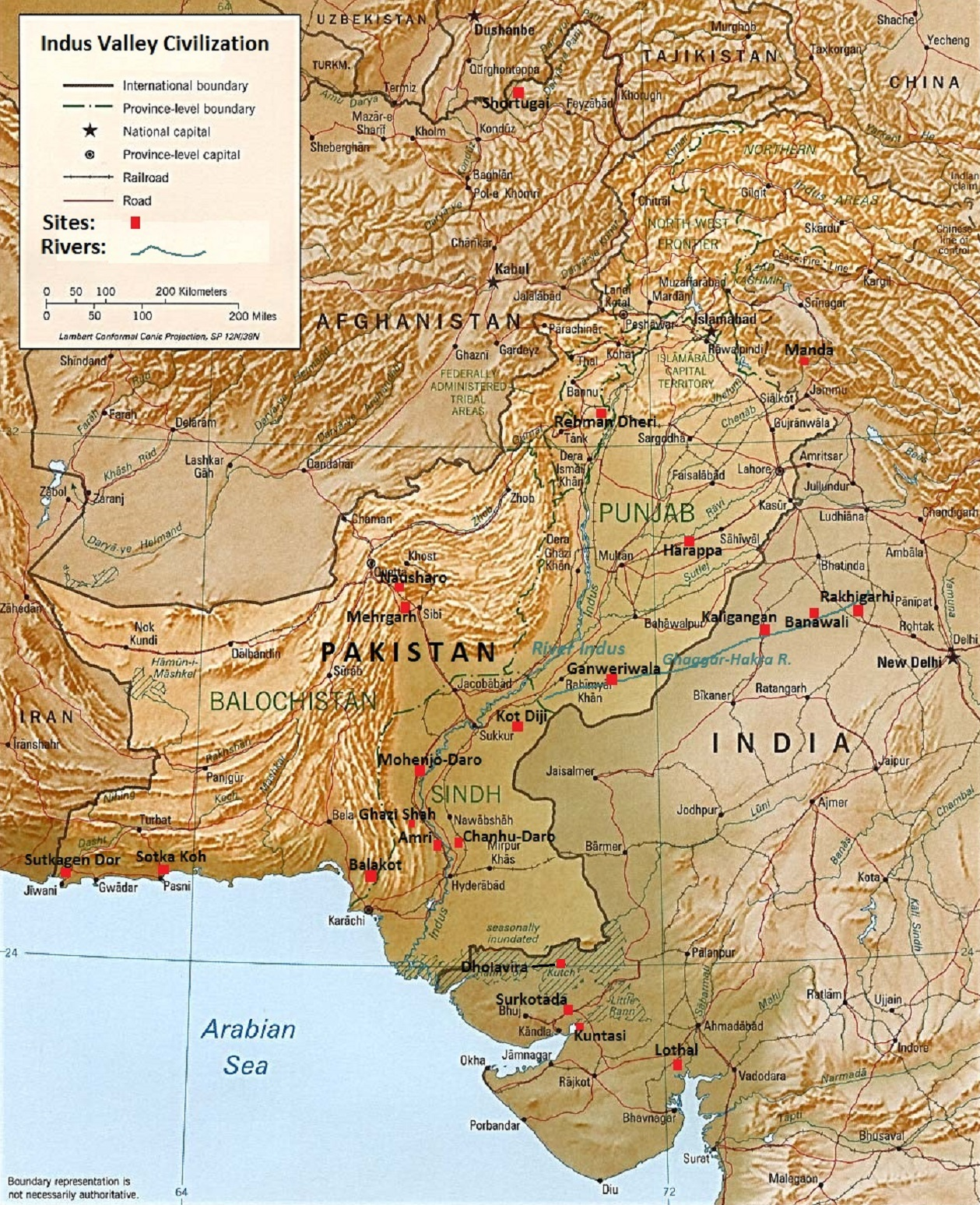
Map showing the sites and extent of the Indus Valley civilisation in Pakistan, including Mehrgarh.

Much of present-day Balochistan province occupies the southeastern most portion of the Iranian plateau. The Kach Gandava Plain in the northeast was the setting for the earliest known farming settlements in the pre-Indus Valley Civilisation era, the earliest of which was Mehrgarh, dated around 7000 BCE.

Although an indigenous population existed during the Bronze Age and under the empire of Alexander the Great, the Baloch people themselves did not appear in the region until the 14th century CE. From the first millennium BCE onwards, the region was divided into several provinces of the Achaemenid Empire, namely Maka, which certainly corresponded to Makran, and Zarang. The Greek authors during the time of Alexander the Great in the 4th century BCE described the region as the inhospitable Gedrosian desert, with scarce vegetation and water. Alexander crossed the Gedrosian desert after returning from Indian subcontinent. According to the ancient Greek writers, the population of Gedrosia consisted of Indian ethnic groups like the Arbies and Oreitae, and Iranian Myci; as well as Ichthyophagi ("Fish-eaters"), sometimes identified with the modern Med people. Seleucus I Nicator was forced to cede Gedrosia along with other northwestern regions to the Mauryan emperor Chandragupta in 302 BCE.

The next significant information about Makran comes from the Sasanian period. A king of Makran paid homage to Sasanian Shah Narseh (r. 293 – 303) upon his accession. Sasanians divided the region into several units, including Makran, Tugran (modern Kalat), Paradan (probably modern Kharan) and Hind. Tugran was well-populated by people speaking a non-Iranian language, possibly the Brahui people of today. The Brahuis, whose language belong to Dravidian family, are considered the remnants of the earliest people of the region. During the Sasanian period Makran and Qayqan (present-day Kalat) had a substantial population of Zuṭṭ or Jat dromedary-men, many of whom were resettled by Sasanians in the southern regions (present-day Iraq) in the times of Bahram V (r. 420 – 438).

Makran was under a dynasty of Hindu Rais who had a capital at Aror in Sindh before the Muslim conquests. It was captured by Persians during the reign of Rai Siharas II, but Chach of Aror recovered Makran in 631 CE. According to the Chachnama, Chach went with his army and marked the border of his kingdom with Kerman by planting date-trees along the banks of a small stream, and branded the following words there, "This is the boundary as established in the days of Chach, son of Salaji, son of Basij, King of Sind, when it came into his possession." The exact border thus marked is uncertain, although according to André Wink it was probably beyond Tiz. A large population of Makran was Buddhist before Muslim conquests, as mentioned by the Chinese pilgrim Xuanzang.

=== Medieval ===
The early Arab geographers regarded Makran a part of al-Sind. An Arab army invaded Makran in 644 during the tenure of caliph Omar (r. 634 – 644). It defeated the king of Sind and marched almost until the Indus River, but after hearing the reports of poor economic conditions and water scarcity in the region, the caliph ordered the troops to not cross the river. The territory of Qayqan in Sind was first conquered by Muslims during the reign of caliph Ali in 659, but in 667 the Muslim governor Abdallah ibn Sawwar al-Abdi was killed in a rebellion and Qayqan was lost. According to the 9th century geographical treatise Futuh al-Buldan, the people of Qayqan were Zuṭṭ. In the following centuries the region attracted a large number of Kharijites. A Kharijite breakaway state was established under the Arab Ma'danid dynasty in Makran in the 9th century, whose rulers adopted the Sanskrit title of maharaj.

In the 11th century the Ghaznavids brought much of Makran under their control. Over the next three centuries the foreign influence over Makran weakened and the region again became relatively autonomous. The Italian traveller Marco Polo mentioned the existence of an independent Muslim state, the Sultanate of Makran, in the 13th century, describing it as the last kingdom in India. According to Marco Polo, the ruler of Makran was known as malek. Food was abundantly produced and the people were involved in trade as well as agriculture.

==== Baloch migrations ====
Baloch people are first mentioned in the historical sources at Kerman, in the 10th century CE. Although Baloch presence was already noted in Makran by 11th century, large-scale Baloch migrations occurred only by the turn of 14th century. Evidence of migrations comes from Baloch epic poetry as well as Mughal sources. According to Baloch folklore, Mir Jalal Khan led forty-four Baloch tribes from Persia during the migration. The descent of five major Baloch tribal divisions, namely Rind, Lashar, Jatoi, Hoth and Korai, is traditionally traced from him. The folklore does not mention several prominent tribes of today, (Note: Bugti, Bulēdī, Buzdar, Kasrānī, and Leghari) which according to the anthropologist Brian Spooner suggests that either they are branches of the aforementioned tribes, or were not assimilated into the Baloch yet.

=== Pre-modern ===
During the era of Baloch chief and folk hero Mir Chakar Rind, another large wave of Baloch people moved to the Punjab Plain in the 15th century. The epic poetry of the period gives much details regarding the intertribal Rind-Lashari War. In 1620, Kij-Makran was taken over by the Buledi tribe from the Malik dynasty, which later came to rule all of Makran. Buledis were followers of Zikrism, a Mahdist sect, as were the Gichkis, who ousted them in 1740. The Brahui Qambrani dynasty established the Khanate of Kalat towards the end of 17th-century in the Kalat highlands. The Khan of Kalat Abdullah Khan died fighting against the Kalhora Amirs of Sindh in 1731. His successor, Muhabat Khan was awarded the Kach Gandava Plains, then ruled by the Sindhi Kalhora dynasty, by Nader Shah during the later's invasion of Mughal Empire in 1739 as blood compensation for the death of Abdullah Khan. Mir Nasir Khan I, the greatest Khan of Kalat, expanded his rule over all of Balochistan. He established a standing army recruited from the tribes of Sarawan and Jhalawan, and an administrative machinery. He pledged allegiance to Ahmad Shah Durrani, who granted him Quetta in 1751. Nasir Khan undertook nine campaigns against Gichkis of Makran, forcing them to recognise his suzerainty, as well as against the rulers of Kharan and Lasbela. The Khanate declined after his death in 1795.

=== Colonial ===
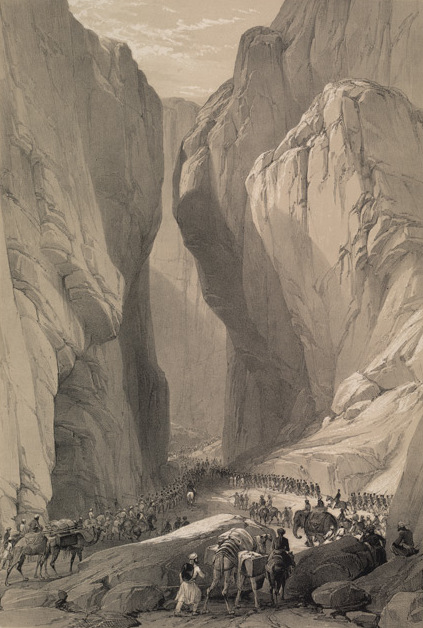
A historical sketch of Bolan Pass, Balochistan, Pakistan

In 1876, Baluchistan became one of the presidencies and provinces of British India, when Robert Sandeman negotiated the Treaty of Kalat, which brought the Khan of Kalat's territories, as well as the princely states of Makran, Kharan, and Las Bela, under British protection, even though they retained internal independence. After facing defeat in the Second Afghan War, the Afghan Emir ceded the districts of Quetta, Pishin, Harnai, and Sibi to the British under the terms of Treaty of Gandamak in May 1879. On 1 April 1883, the British took control of the Bolan Pass, south-east of Quetta, from the Khan of Kalat. In 1887, small additional areas of Balochistan were declared British territory. Two devastating earthquakes occurred in Balochistan during British colonial rule: the 1935 Quetta earthquake, which devastated Quetta, and the 1945 Balochistan earthquake with its epicentre in the Makran region.

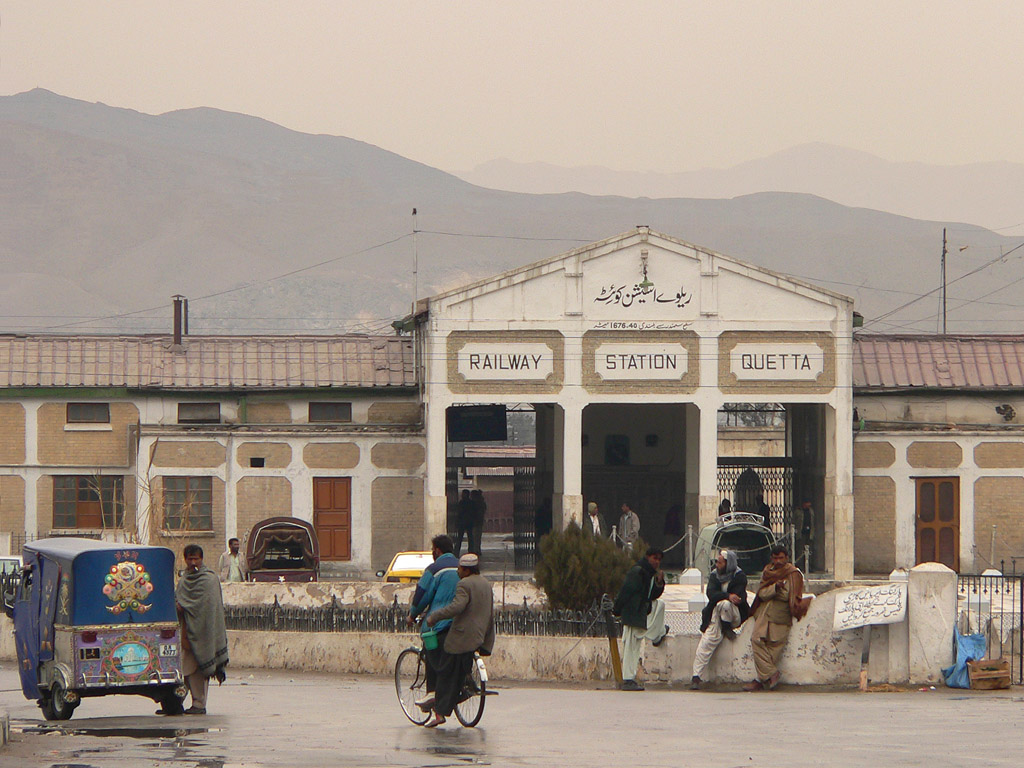
Quetta Railway Station

In British India, Baluchistan consisted of a Chief Commissioner's province and princely states (including Kalat, Makran, Las Bela, and Kharan) that became a part of Pakistan. During the time of the Indian independence movement, three pro-Congress parties were still active in Balochistan's politics apart from Balochistan's Muslim League, including the Anjuman-i-Watan Baluchistan, which opposed partition of British India. The province's Shahi Jirga (the grand council of tribal elders) and the non-official members of the Quetta Municipality, according to the Pakistani version, agreed to join Pakistan unanimously on 29 June 1947; however, the political scientist Salman Rafi Sheikh states that the Shahi Jirga was stripped of its members from the Kalat State before the vote. The then-president of the Balochistan Muslim League, Qazi Muhammad Isa, informed Muhammad Ali Jinnah that "Shahi Jirga in no way represents the popular wishes of the masses" and that members of the Kalat State were "excluded from voting; only representatives from the British part of the province voted including the leased areas of Quetta, Nasirabad Tehsil, Nushki and Bolan Agency." Following the referendum, on 22 June 1947 the Khan of Kalat Ahmad Yar Khan received a letter from members of the Shahi Jirga, as well as sardars from the leased areas of Baluchistan, stating that they, "as a part of the Baloch nation, were a part of the Kalat state too" and that if the question of Baluchistan's accession to Pakistan arise, "they should be deemed part of the Kalat state rather than (British) Balochistan". This has brought into question whether an actual vote took place, says Sheikh.

=== After independence ===
Lasbela, whose ruler belonged to the Jamote family, was first of the four princely states to accede to Pakistan on 7 March 1948. It was followed by accession of Makran and Kharan on 17 March; the accession of all three was accepted by the Pakistani government on the same day. According to Dushka H. Saiyid, Ahmad Yar Khan lost all of his bargaining chips with the accession of Kharan, Las Bela, and Makran, leaving Kalat as a land-locked island. Salman Rafi Sheikh largely concurs with Saiyid's assessment: multiple other Kalat sardars were preparing to accede to Pakistan and Ahmad Yar Khan would have hardly any territory left, if he did not accede. Initially aspiring for independence, the Khan of Kalat finally acceded to Pakistan on 27 March 1948 following a period of negotiations with Pakistan. The signing of the Instrument of Accession by Ahmad Yar Khan led his brother, Prince Abdul Karim, to revolt against his brother's decision due to their family rift in July 1948. The Prince indulged in terrorist activities without any assistance from others. Princes Agha Abdul Karim Baloch and Muhammad Rahim refused to lay down arms, leading the Dosht-e Jhalawan in unconventional attacks on the army until 1950. Baluchistan States Union was established in 1952 with Khan of Kalat as its head. Jinnah and his successors allowed Yar Khan to retain his title until the province's dissolution in 1955 into West Pakistan.

Gwadar, a region of Balochistan, was a colony of Oman for more than a century, from 1783 until 1958, when it was purchased by Pakistan. Many people in this region are therefore Omani. In 1970, the prior four provinces were restored, resulting in the establishment of Balochistan province.

Insurgencies by Baloch separatists took place in 1948–1950, 1958–1960, 1962–1969, and 1973–1977, with an ongoing insurgency by autonomy-seeking Baloch groups since 2003. While many Baloch support the demand for autonomy, the majority is reportedly not interested in seceding from Pakistan.

At a press conference on 8 June 2015 in Quetta, the provincial Home Minister Sarfraz Bugti accused India's Prime Minister Narendra Modi of openly supporting terrorism. Bugti implicated India's Research and Analysis Wing (RAW) of being responsible for recent attacks at military bases in Smangli and Khalid, and for subverting the China–Pakistan Economic Corridor (CPEC) agreement.

== Geography ==
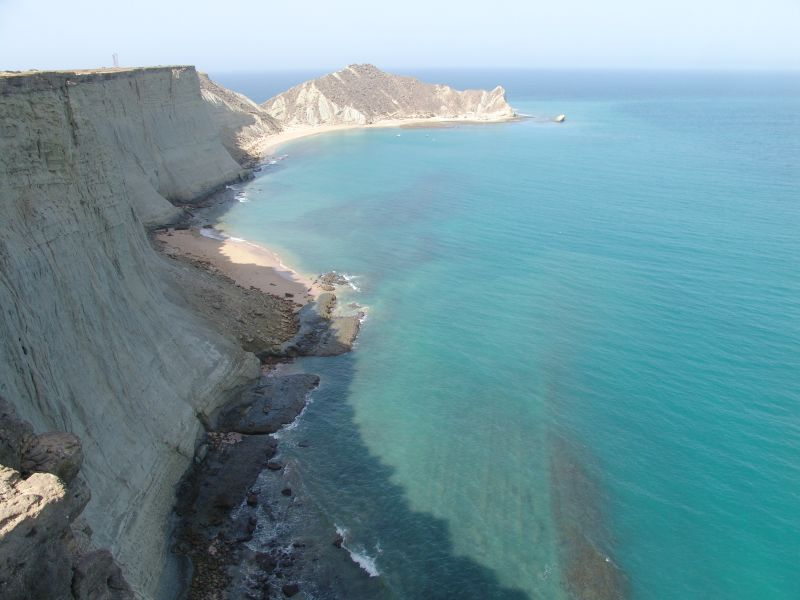
Astola Island

Balochistan is situated in the southwest of Pakistan and covers an area of 347,190 square kilometres (134,050 mi^{2}). It is Pakistan's largest province by area, constituting 44% of Pakistan's total landmass. The province is bordered by Afghanistan to the north and northwest, Iran to the south-west, Punjab and Sindh, and Khyber Pakhtunkhwa and the Federally Administered Tribal Areas to the northeast. To the south lies the Arabian Sea. Balochistan is located in the southeastern part of the Iranian plateau. It borders the geopolitical regions of the Middle East and Southwest Asia, Central Asia, and South Asia. Balochistan lies at the mouth of the Strait of Hormuz and provides the shortest route from seaports to Central Asia. Its geographical location has placed the otherwise desolate region in the scope of competing for global interests for all of recorded history.

The capital city, Quetta, is located in a densely populated portion of the Sulaiman Mountains in the northeast of the province. It is situated in a river valley near the Bolan Pass, which has been used as the route of choice from the coast to Central Asia, entering through Afghanistan's Kandahar region. The British and other historic empires have crossed the region to invade Afghanistan by this route.

Balochistan is rich in non-renewable and renewable resources; it is the second-largest supplier of natural gas in Pakistan. The province's renewable and human resource potential has not been systematically measured or exploited. Local inhabitants have chosen to live in towns and have relied on sustainable water sources for thousands of years.

=== Climate ===
The climate of the upper highlands is characterised by very cold winters and hot summers. In the lower highlands, winters vary from extremely cold in northern districts of Ziarat, Quetta, Kalat, Muslim Bagh, and Khanozai, where temperatures can drop to −20 °C (−4 °F), to milder conditions closer to the Makran coast. Winters are mild on the plains, with temperatures never falling below freezing point. Summers are hot and dry, especially in the arid zones of Chagai and Kharan districts. The plains are also very hot in summer, with temperatures reaching 50 °C (122 °F). The record high temperature, 53 °C (127 °F), was recorded in Sibi on 26 May 2010, exceeding the previous record, 52 °C (126 °F). Other hot areas include Turbat and Dalbandin. The desert climate is characterised by hot and very arid conditions. Occasionally, strong windstorms make these areas very inhospitable.

== Government and politics ==
In common with the other provinces of Pakistan, Balochistan has a parliamentary form of government. The ceremonial head of the province is the Governor, who is appointed on the advice of the Chief Minister of Balochistan by the President of Pakistan. The Chief Minister, the province's chief executive, is normally the leader of the largest political party or alliance of parties in the provincial assembly.

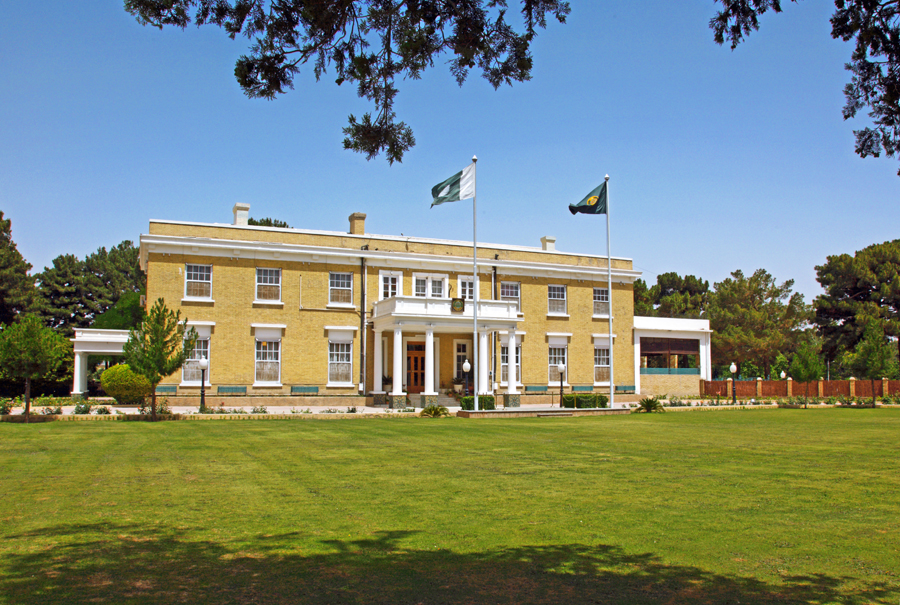
Balochistan Governor's House, Quetta

The unicameral Provincial Assembly of Balochistan comprises 65 seats, of which 11 are reserved for women, and 3 are reserved for non-Muslims. The judicial branch of government is carried out by the Balochistan High Court, which is based in Quetta and headed by a Chief Justice.

Besides the dominant Pakistan-wide political parties (such as the Pakistan Tehreek-e-Insaf, Pakistan Muslim League (N), and the Pakistan Peoples Party), Balochistan nationalist parties (such as the National Party and the Balochistan National Party (Mengal)) have been prominent in the province.

=== Administrative divisions ===
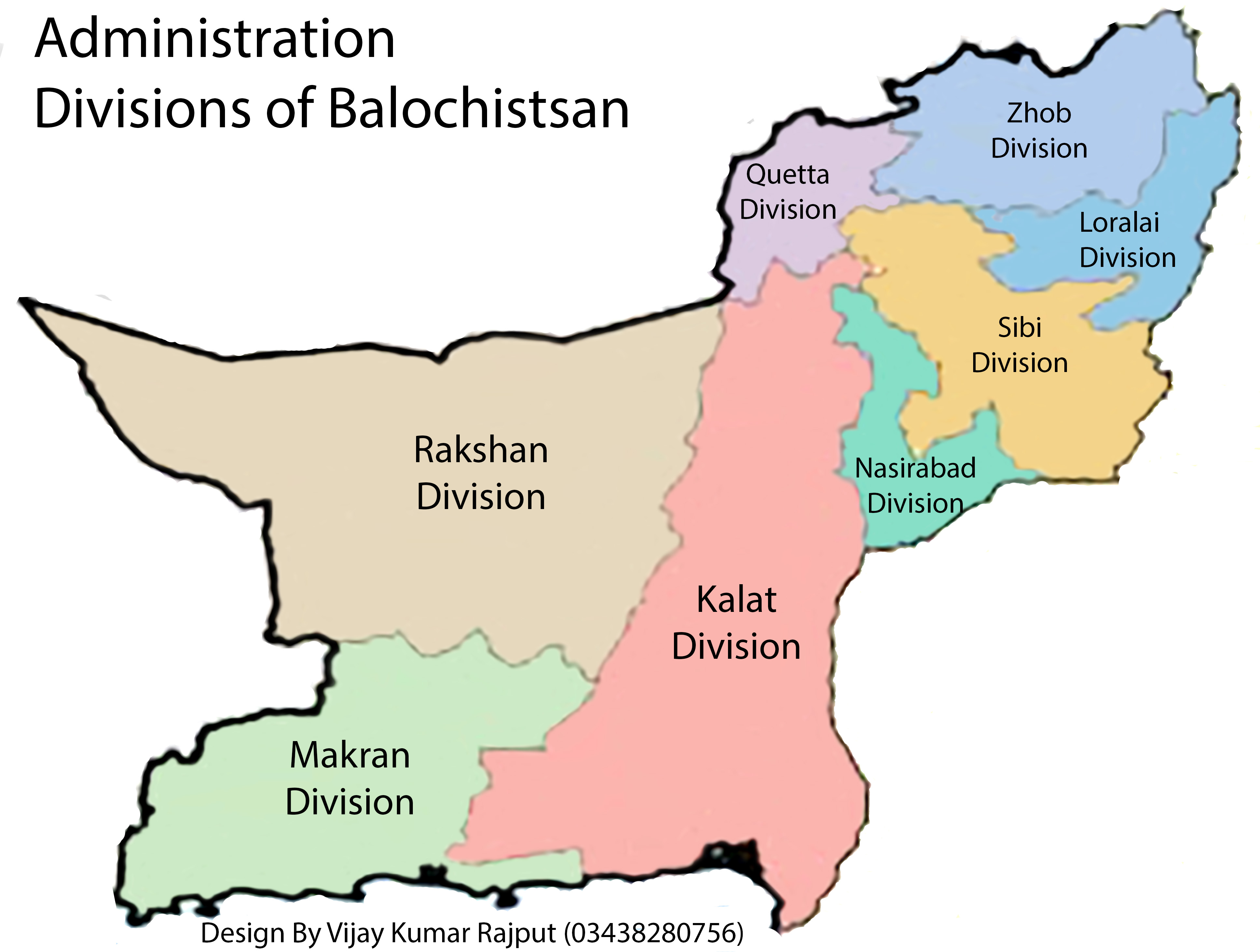
Divisions of Balochistan

Note: In this map, Lehri is shown within Sibi District on#27. Sohbatpur and Usta Muhammad is shown within Jafarabad District on #8.Hub is shown within Lasbela District on #17.

For administrative purposes, the province is divided into seven divisions: Kalat, Makran, Nasirabad, Quetta, Sibi, Zhob, and Rakhshan. This divisional level was abolished in 2000, but restored after the 2008 election. Each division is under an appointed commissioner. The seven divisions are further subdivided into 36 districts:

As of June 2021, there are eight divisions. The eighth division, Loralai Division, was created by bifurcating Zhob Division.

District	Capital	Area (km^{2}) (2023)	Population (2023)	Density (people/km^{2}) (2023)	Literacy rate (2023)	HDI (2023)	Division
Kalat	Kalat	7,654	272,506	35.6	39.97%		Khuzdar
Surab	Surab	4,783	429,966	89.8	43.41%		Khuzdar
Wadh	Wadh	17,355	381,599	21.9	51.07%		Khuzdar
Khuzdar	Khuzdar	10,747	428,037	39.8	36.40%		Khuzdar
Awaran	Awaran	29,510	178,958	6.0	39.97%		Lasbela
Hub	Hub	6,716	382,885	57.0	51.07%		Lasbela
Lasbela	Lasbela	11,694	334,472	28.6	36.40%		Lasbela
Chaman	Chaman	1,341	466,218	347.7	39.97%		Pishin
Pishin	Pishin	6,218	835,482	134.6	51.07%		Pishin
Barshore	Barshore	2,288	141,994	62.06	37.61%		Pishin
Qila Abdullah	Jungle Pir Alizai	3,553	361,971	102.3	36.40%		Pishin
Quetta East	Quetta	3,447	2,595,492	754.3	56.29%		Quetta
Quetta West	Quetta	3,308	313,271	94.7	35.97%		Quetta
Mastung	Mastung	5,896	313,271	94.7	35.97%		Quetta
Sohbatpur	Sohbatpur	802	240,106	299.6	41.02%		Nasirabad
Nasirabad	Dera Murad Jamali	3,387	563,315	166.1	28.96%		Nasirabad
Usta Muhammad	Usta Muhammad	953	292,060	280	35.53%		Nasirabad
Jafarabad	Dera Allahyar	690	302498	361.1	35.53 %		Nasirabad
Jhal Magsi	Gandava	3,615	203,368	56.2	30.14%		Nasirabad
Chagai	Dalbandin	19,338	219,308	11.3	33.15%		Rakhshan
Washuk	Washuk	21,430	247038	9.1	21.58%		Rakhshan
Taftan	Taftan	37,073	105,469	2.8	41.07%		Rakhshan
Kharan	Kharan	14,958	260,352	17.4	41.07%		Rakhshan
Nushki	Nushki	5,797	207,834	35.9	57.12%		Rakhshan
Harnai	Harnai	3,301	189,535	57.4	43.37%		Sibi
Dera Bugti	Dera Bugti	3,839	190,191	30.0	25.9%		Sibi
Sibi	Sibi	7,121	224,148	31.5	47.41%		Sibi
Kacchi	Dhadar	5,682	442,674	77.9	30.2%		Sibi
Kohlu	Kohlu	7,610	260,220	34.2	28.53%		Koh e Sulaiman
Upper Dera Bugti	Baiker	6,321	165,083	30.0	25.9%		Koh e Sulaiman
Barkhan	Barkhan	3,514	210,249	59.83	33.62%		Koh e Sulaiman
Loralai	Loralai	3,785	398,832	105.4	54.16%		Loralai
Ziarat	Ziarat	3,301	189,535	57.4	43.37%		Loralai
Musakhel	Musakhel	5,728	182,275	31.82	36.60%		Loralai
Duki	Duki, Pakistan	4,233	205,044	48.44	44.18%		Loralai
Panjgur	Panjgur	16,891	509,781	30.18	42.07%		Makran
Gwadar	Gwadar	12,637	305,160	24.14	50.30%		Makran
Kech	Turbat	19,138	857,118	44.78	49.65%		Makran
Tump	Tump	3,401	203/813	59.92	51.0%		Makran
Zhob	Zhob	15,987	355,692	22.2	36.62%		Zhob
Killa Saifullah	Killa Saifullah	6,831	380,200	55.7	32.96%		Zhob
Sherani	Sherani	4,310	191,687	44.5	23.86%		Zhob

Former district

- Lehri District abolished in 2018.
- Karezat-Barshore District created on 21 November 2022, on 22 November Barshore tehsil minus from karezat-barshore District and barshore tehsil merge again in Pishin district Later on 29 November 2022 Balochistan Government Abolished Karezat District.

== Demographics ==
Historical populations
Census	Population	Urban
1901	810,746	N/A
1911	834,703	N/A
1921	799,625	N/A
1931	868,617	N/A
1941	857,835	13.30%
1951	1,167,167	12.38%
1961	1,353,484	16.87%
1972	2,428,678	16.45%
1981	4,332,376	15.62%
1998	6,565,885	23.89%
2017	12,344,408	27.55%
2023	14,894,402	30.96%

Balochistan's population density is low due to the mountainous terrain and scarcity of water. In March 2012, preliminary census figures showed that the population of Balochistan, not including the districts of Khuzdar, Kech and Panjgur, had reached 13,162,222, an increase of 139.3% from 5,501,164 in 1998. The population constituted 6.85% of Pakistan's total population. This was the largest increase in population in any province of Pakistan during that time period, almost thrice the national increase of 46.9%. Official estimates of Balochistan's population grew from approximately 7.45 million in 2003 to 7.8 million in 2005. The 2023 Census enumerated a population of 14,894,402.

As per a 2025 Dawn News report, based on data compiled by research organisation Population Council, UK Aid and the United Nations Population, Balochistan had an annual growth rate of 3.20%. According to demographic projections, if the province's current total fertility rate of 4 children per woman remains unchanged, Balochistan's population could more than double to approximately 35 million by 2050.

=== Languages ===
Languages of Balochistan (2023)
1. Balochi (39.9%)
2. Pashto (34.0%)
3. Brahui (17.2%)
4. Sindhi (3.81%)
5. Saraiki (2.19%)
6. Punjabi (0.59%)
7. Urdu (0.53%)
8. Others (1.50%)

According to the preliminary results of the 2023 census, the languages with the most native speakers in the province are Balochi, spoken by 39.91% of the population (an increase of 4% compared to the 2017 census), and Pashto whose share is at 34.34%.

The Pashtuns mainly inhabit the north of Balochistan and form the majority in Quetta. Baloch on the other hand are found throughout Balochistan, but most highly concentrated in the west and south of the province.

Brahui is spoken by 17.22% mainly in the central part of Balochistan. Other languages include Sindhi (3.81%), Saraiki (2.19%), Punjabi (0.59%), Urdu (0.53%) and others at (1.5%).

Balochi forms the majority in 21 districts and Pashto forms majority in 9 districts of Balochistan. Brahui has majority in 4 districts. In the Lasbela, Hub districts and in Kachhi plain region a large minority of the population speaks Lasi and Siraiki, which are dialects of Sindhi.

According to the Ethnologue, households speaking Balochi, whose primary dialect is Makrani constitutes 13%, Rukhshani 10%, Sulemani 7%, and Khetrani 3% of the population. Other languages spoken are Lasi, Urdu, Punjabi, Hazargi, Sindhi, Saraiki, Dehvari, Dari, Tajik, Hindko, Uzbek, and Hindki.

The 2005 census concerning Afghans in Pakistan showed that a total of 769,268 Afghan refugees were temporarily staying in Balochistan. However, there are probably fewer Afghans living in Balochistan today as many refugees repatriated in 2013. As of 2015, there are only 327,778 registered Afghan refugees according to the UNHCR.

Language in Balochistan Province (1911–2023)
Mother Tongue	1911		1921		1931		2017		2023	
Mother Tongue	Pop.	%	Pop.	%	Pop.	%	Pop.	%	Pop.	%
Balochi	233,240	27.94%	225,368	28.18%	267,074	30.75%	4,377,825	35.49%	5,811,185	39.91%
Pashto	227,553	27.26%	201,873	25.25%	207,181	23.85%	4,359,533	35.34%	4,955,245	34.03%
Brahui	145,299	17.41%	139,727	17.47%	127,479	14.68%	2,112,295	17.12%	2,507,157	17.22%
Sindhi	121,849	14.6%	111,412	13.93%	153,032	17.62%	562,309	4.56%	555,198	3.81%
Punjabi/Saraiki/Hindko (Note: Standard Punjabi, Saraiki, and Hindko included together for comparative purposes, as they were previously enumerated jointly as Punjabi languages and dialects.)	75,641	9.06%	80,706	10.09%	69,869	8.04%	500,164 (Note: Saraiki: 326,656 persons Standard Punjabi: 139,207 persons Hindko: 34,301 persons)	4.05%	429,715 (Note: Saraiki: 319,054 persons Standard Punjabi: 86,457 persons Hindko: 24,204 persons)	2.95%
Urdu (Note: Previously also enumerated as Hindi or Hindustani.)	10,983	1.32%	16,267	2.03%	17,131	1.97%	100,528	0.81%	77,249	0.53%
Dehwari	7,579	0.91%	6,268	0.78%	5,233	0.6%	—N/a	—N/a	—N/a	—N/a
English	4,349	0.52%	5,053	0.63%	5,369	0.62%	—N/a	—N/a	—N/a	—N/a
Persian	3,833	0.46%	3,591	0.45%	5,020	0.58%	—N/a	—N/a	—N/a	—N/a
Pahari	2,258	0.27%	5,401	0.68%	7,901	0.91%	—N/a	—N/a	—N/a	—N/a
Marathi	846	0.1%	1,124	0.14%	789	0.09%	—N/a	—N/a	—N/a	—N/a
Gujarati	580	0.07%	494	0.06%	618	0.07%	—N/a	—N/a	—N/a	—N/a
Rajasthani (Mewati)	324	0.04%	962	0.12%	530	0.06%	—N/a	—N/a	285	0%
Bihari	144	0.02%	490	0.06%	—N/a	—N/a	—N/a	—N/a	—N/a	—N/a
Arabic	78	0.01%	6	0%	9	0%	—N/a	—N/a	—N/a	—N/a
Tamil	55	0.01%	349	0.04%	150	0.02%	—N/a	—N/a	—N/a	—N/a
Telugu	20	0%	64	0.01%	42	0%	—N/a	—N/a	—N/a	—N/a
Kashmiri	16	0%	165	0.02%	201	0.02%	17,803	0.14%	7,352	0.05%
Bengali	13	0%	70	0.01%	93	0.01%	—N/a	—N/a	—N/a	—N/a
Shina	—N/a	—N/a	—N/a	—N/a	—N/a	—N/a	—N/a	—N/a	1,278	0.01%
Kohistani	—N/a	—N/a	—N/a	—N/a	—N/a	—N/a	—N/a	—N/a	1,014	0.01%
Balti	—N/a	—N/a	—N/a	—N/a	—N/a	—N/a	—N/a	—N/a	846	0.01%
Kalasha	—N/a	—N/a	—N/a	—N/a	—N/a	—N/a	—N/a	—N/a	82	0%
Others	43	0.01%	235	0.03%	896	0.1%	304,672	2.47%	215,405	1.48%
Total responses	834,703	100%	799,625	100%	868,617	100%	12,335,129	100%	14,562,011	97.77%
Total population	834,703	100%	799,625	100%	868,617	100%	12,335,129	100%	14,894,402	100%

=== Religion ===
Religion in Balochistan (2023 Census)
Religion	Percent
Islam	99.09%
Christianity	0.43%
Hinduism	0.41%
Others	0.07%

According to the 2023 Census, nearly all of the population of Balochistan were Muslims. There were also Christian and Hindu minorities in the province.The Christian Population was approximately 62,732 and Hindu population in the province was approximately 59,107 (including the Scheduled Castes). The Shri Hinglaj Mata mandir which is the largest Hindu pilgrimage centre in Pakistan is situated in Balochistan.

Religion in Balochistan (1901–2023)
Religious group	1901		1911		1921		1931		1941		1951		1998		2017		2023	
Religious group	Pop.	%	Pop.	%	Pop.	%	Pop.	%	Pop.	%	Pop.	%	Pop.	%	Pop.	%	Pop.	%
Islam	765,368	94.4%	782,648	93.76%	733,477	91.73%	798,093	91.88%	785,181	91.53%	1,137,063	98.52%	6,484,006	98.75%	12,255,528	99.28%	14,429,568	99.09%
Christianity	4,026	0.5%	5,085	0.61%	6,693	0.84%	8,059	0.93%	6,056	0.71%	3,937	0.34%	26,462	0.4%	33,330	0.27%	62,731	0.43%
Hinduism	38,158	4.71%	38,326	4.59%	51,348	6.42%	53,681	6.18%	54,394	6.34%	13,087	1.13%	39,146	0.6%	49,378	0.4%	59,107	0.41%
Sikhism	2,972	0.37%	8,390	1.01%	7,741	0.97%	8,425	0.97%	12,044	1.4%	—N/a	—N/a	—N/a	—N/a	—N/a	—N/a	1,057	0.007%
Zoroastrianism	166	0.02%	170	0.02%	165	0.02%	167	0.02%	76	0.01%	79	0.01%	—N/a	—N/a	—N/a	—N/a	181	0%
Judaism	48	0.01%	57	0.01%	19	0.002%	17	0.002%	20	0.002%	—N/a	—N/a	—N/a	—N/a	—N/a	—N/a	—N/a	—N/a
Jainism	8	0.001%	10	0.001%	17	0.002%	17	0.002%	7	0.001%	—N/a	—N/a	—N/a	—N/a	—N/a	—N/a	—N/a	—N/a
Buddhism	0	0%	16	0.002%	160	0.02%	68	0.01%	43	0.01%	1	0%	—N/a	—N/a	—N/a	—N/a	—N/a	—N/a
Ahmadiyya	—N/a	—N/a	—N/a	—N/a	—N/a	—N/a	—N/a	—N/a	—N/a	—N/a	—N/a	—N/a	9,800	0.15%	2,469	0.02%	557	0.004%
Others	0	0%	1	0%	5	0.001%	75	0.009%	14	0.002%	0	0%	6,471	0.1%	3,703	0.03%	8,810	0.06%
Total responses	810,746	100%	834,703	100%	799,625	100%	868,617	100%	857,835	100%	1,154,167	98.31%	6,565,885	100%	12,344,408	100%	14,562,011	97.77%
Total population	810,746	100%	834,703	100%	799,625	100%	868,617	100%	857,835	100%	1,174,036	100%	6,565,885	100%	12,344,408	100%	14,894,402	100%

== Education ==
The literacy rate of the province in 2017 was 43.6%, an increase from 24.8% in 1998.

== Economy ==
The economy of Balochistan is largely based upon agriculture, livestock, fisheries, production of natural gas, coal, and other minerals.

Though agriculture and livestock play a dominant role in the provincial economy by contributing 47% of its GDP. It faced extensive damage due to the 2022 Pakistan floods. The floods killed around 500,000 of Balochistan's livestock and damaged cultivation and agricultural output in 32 out of 35 districts of the province. The Lasbela district was the worst hit as the floods washed away four-fifths of the homes, crops, and livestock. Due to the floods and severe drought conditions, the province faces food insecurity and is 85% dependent on the Sindh and Punjab provinces for the supply of wheat.

Furthermore, with the exception of Quetta, Balochistan has been called a "neglected province where a majority of the population lacks amenities." Although the province is rich in natural resources capable of uplifting its economy, most of them have not been fully utilised for the welfare of the population and are yet to be explored or developed.

Since the mid-1970s, the province's contribution to Pakistan's GDP has dropped from 4.9 to 3.7%, and as of 2007, it had the highest poverty rate and infant and maternal mortality rate, and the lowest literacy rate in comparison to other provinces, factors some allege have contributed to the insurgency. However, in the seventh NFC awards, Punjab province and the Federal contributed to increase Baluchistan share more than its entitled population-based share. In Balochistan, poverty is increasing. In 2001–2002, poverty incidences were at 48% and by 2005–2006, these were at 50.9%. According to a report on Dawn, the rate of multidimensional poverty in Balochistan had risen to 71% by 2016.

Several major development projects, including the construction of a new deep-sea port at the strategically important town of Gwadar, are in progress in Balochistan. The port is projected to be the hub of an energy and trade corridor to and from China, the Middle East, and the Central Asian republics. The Mirani Dam on the Dasht River, 50 kilometres (31 mi) west of Turbat in the Makran Division, is being built to provide water to expand agricultural land use by 35,000 km^{2} (14,000 sq mi) where it would otherwise be unsustainable. In the district of Lasbela, there is an oil refinery owned by Byco International Incorporated (BII), which is capable of processing 120,000 barrels of oil per day. A power station is located adjacent to the refinery. Several cement plants and a marble factory are also located there. One of the world's largest ship-breaking yards is located on the coast.

=== Natural resource extraction ===
Balochistan's share of Pakistan's national income has historically ranged between 3.7% to 4.9%. Since 1972, Balochistan's gross income has grown in size by 2.7 times. Outside Quetta, the resource extraction infrastructure of the province is gradually developing but still lags far behind other parts of Pakistan.

The agreements for royalty rights and ownership of mineral rights were reached during a period of unprecedented natural disasters, economic, social, political, and cultural unrest in Pakistan. The negotiations were widely considered to be insufficiently transparent.

== Tourism ==
Following is a list of a few tourist attractions and places of interest in Balochistan:

- Astola Island
- Bolan Pass
- Dureji
- Gadani Beach
- Gadani Ship Breaking Yard
- Gwadar
- Hanna Lake
- Hazarganji-Chiltan National Park, near Quetta.
- Hinglaj Mata Temples
- Hingol National Park
- Hub Dam
- Jiwani Coastal Wetland
- Khuzdar
- Kund Malir
- Makran Coastal Highway
- Mehrgarh
- Moola Chotok
- Pir Ghaib Waterfall
- Quaid-e-Azam Residency
- Quetta
- Princess of Hope
- Urak Valley
- Zhob
- Ziarat Juniper Forest
- Ziarat

== CNIC Codes ==
- Kalat Division (51XXX)
- Makran Division (52XXX)
- Nasirabad Division (53XXX)
- Quetta Division (54XXX)
- Sibi Division (55XXX)
- Zhob Division + Loralai Division (56XXX)

== See also ==
- List of cultural heritage sites in Balochistan, Pakistan
- List of cities in Balochistan, Pakistan
