= List of tehsils of Balochistan =

In Pakistan, a tehsil is an administrative sub-division of a District. Those are sub-divided into union councils. Here is a list of all the tehsils of Balochistan Province.

== List of the tehsils ==
Tehsil	Area (km^{2})	Population (2023)	Density (ppl/km^{2}) (2023)	Literacy rate (2023)	District	Division
Awaran Tehsil	13,075	45,774	3.50	42.90%	Awaran	Khuzdar
Gishkaur Tehsil	4,578	31,462	6.87	36.34%	Awaran	Khuzdar
Jhal Jhao Tehsil	6,381	28,132	4.41	26.62%	Awaran	Khuzdar
Korak Jhao Tehsil	3,058	27,652	9.04	26.71%	Awaran	Khuzdar
Mashkay Tehsil	2,418	45,938	19.00	41.21%	Awaran	Khuzdar
Gadani Tehsil	419	29,215	69.73	48.57%	Hub	Khuzdar
Sonmiani Tehsil	2,616	67,991	25.99	35.80%	Hub	Khuzdar
Hub Tehsil	868	233,443	268.94	44.35%	Hub	Khuzdar
Sakran Tehsil	...	...	...	...	Hub	Khuzdar
Dureji Tehsil	2,813	52,236	18.57	15.58%	Hub	Khuzdar
Kalat Tehsil	3,788	167,405	44.19	44.19%	Kalat	Khuzdar
Mangocher Tehsil	1,148	80,138	69.81	35.22%	Kalat	Khuzdar
Gazg Tehsil	1,390	8,286	5.96	18.75%	Kalat	Khuzdar
Johan Tehsil	1,328	15,731	11.85	27.49%	Kalat	Khuzdar
Khuzdar Tehsil	6,112	359,358	58.80	43.85%	Khuzdar	Khuzdar
Nal Tehsil	1,791	103,631	57.86	47.26%	Khuzdar	Khuzdar
Wadh Tehsil	2,118	116,229	54.88	31.83%	Khuzdar	Khuzdar
Zehri Tehsil	4,021	150,928	37.53	49.38%	Khuzdar	Khuzdar
Baghbana Tehsil	...	...	...	...	Khuzdar	Khuzdar
Aranji Tehsil	7,456	50,533	6.78	12.11%	Khuzdar	Khuzdar
Gresha Tehsil	2,622	69,665	26.57	22.10%	Khuzdar	Khuzdar
Karkh Tehsil	5,352	145806	26.62	32.14%	Khuzdar	Khuzdar
Moola Tehsil	3,283	32,689	9.96	52.68%	Khuzdar	Khuzdar
Ornach Tehsil	3,368	41,811	12.41	21.58%	Khuzdar	Khuzdar
Saroona Tehsil	3,257	36,380	11.17	24.22%	Khuzdar	Khuzdar
Uthal Tehsil	1,756	88,933	50.65	33.95%	Lasbela	Khuzdar
Lakhra Tehsil	1,954	46,744	23.92	15.31%	Lasbela	Khuzdar
Bela Tehsil	1,527	129,264	84.65	40.98%	Lasbela	Khuzdar
Kanraj Tehsil	1,190	15,996	13.44	20.32%	Lasbela	Khuzdar
Liari Tehsil	2,010	17,155	8.53	16.09%	Lasbela	Khuzdar
Dasht Tehsil	1,047	67,935	64.89	36.79%	Mastung	Khuzdar
Mastung Tehsil	692	162,319	234.57	53.70%	Mastung	Khuzdar
Khad Koocha Tehsil	640	46,316	72.37	33.22%	Mastung	Khuzdar
Kardigap Tehsil	929	36,701	39.51	42.71%	Mastung	Khuzdar
Dasht e Goran	215	27,503	127.92	38.85%	Surab	Khuzdar
Gidder	205	89,631	437.22	36.31%	Surab	Khuzdar
Shaheed meharabad zehri	109	66,435	609.50	42.85%	Surab	Khuzdar
Surab Tehsil	233	95,469	409.74	34.34%	Surab	Khuzdar
Dalbandin Tehsil	7,791	122,918	15.78	39.10%	Chagai	Rakhshan
Nok Kundi Tehsil	16,092	30,625	1.90	48.57%	Chagai	Rakhshan
Taftan Tehsil	9,318	19,259	2.07	19.70%	Chagai	Rakhshan
Chagai Tehsil	3,975	73,482	18.49	23.77%	Chagai	Rakhshan
Amuri tehsil	...	...	...	...	Chagai	Rakhshan
Chilgazi tehsil	...	...	...	...	Chagai	Rakhshan
Yakmach	7,572	22,908	3.03	24.36%	Chagai	Rakhshan
Kharan Tehsil	2,941	104,035	35.37	48.63%	Kharan	Rakhshan
Sar-Kharan Tehsil	3,539	86,015	24.30	36.70%	Kharan	Rakhshan
Tohumulk Tehsil	6,347	49,803	7.85	34.81%	Kharan	Rakhshan
Patkain Tehsil	2,131	20,499	9.62	35.06%	Kharan	Rakhshan
Nushki Tehsil	3,731	190,905	51.17	59.04%	Nushki	Rakhshan
Dak Tehsil	2,066	16,929	8.19	36.29%	Nushki	Rakhshan
Besima Tehsil	6,014	63,368	10.54	31.83%	Washuk	Rakhshan
Mashkel Tehsil	11,663	67,142	5.76	16.33%	Washuk	Rakhshan
Washuk Tehsil	7,494	55,585	7.42	18.10%	Washuk	Rakhshan
Nag Tehsil	4,338	57,467	13.25	18.02%	Washuk	Rakhshan
Shahgori Tehsil	3,584	59,061	16.48	23.55%	Washuk	Rakhshan
Barkhan Tehsil	3,514	210,249	59.83	33.62%	Barkhan	Loralai
Duki Tehsil	938	137,294	146.37	50.48%	Duki	Loralai
Luni Tehsil	553	13,615	24.62	33.80%	Duki	Loralai
Talao Tehsil	1,697	21,930	12.92	21.41%	Duki	Loralai
Thal Chutyali Tehsil	1,045	32,205	30.82	38.10%	Duki	Loralai
Bori Tehsil	2,203	225,642	102.42	46.82%	Loralai	Loralai
Mekhtar Tehsil	1,582	46,790	29.58	24.55%	Loralai	Loralai
Darug Tehsil	301	21,792	72.40	65.37%	Musakhel	Loralai
Kingri Tehseel	3,683	33,618	9.13	45.37%	Musakhel	Loralai
Musakhel Tehsil	658	49,809	75.70	34.51%	Musakhel	Loralai
Tiyar Essot Tehsil	299	10,568	35.34	24.71%	Musakhel	Loralai
Toisar Tehsil	539	56,818	105.41	26.06%	Musakhel	Loralai
Zimri Plaseen Tehsil	248	9,670	38.99	15.02%	Musakhel	Loralai
Chaman Tehsil	22	130,139	5,915.41	51.36%	Chaman	Sibi
Chaman Saddar Tehsil	1,319	336,079	254.80	35.18%	Chaman	Sibi
Harnai Tehsil	259	82,001	316.61	36.28%	Harnai	Sibi
Shahrig Tehsil	614	29,005	47.24	50.12%	Harnai	Sibi
Khost Tehsil	1,619	16,565	10.23	40.35%	Harnai	Sibi
Kahan Tehsil	3,754	107,840	28.73	19.87%	Kohlu	Sibi
Kohlu Tehsil	231	48,050	208.01	49.76%	Kohlu	Sibi
Maiwand Tehsil	2,915	51,635	17.71	25.75%	Kohlu	Sibi
Tamboo Tehsil	536	37,449	69.87	29.32%	Kohlu	Sibi
Shaheed Jahangir Abad	...	...	...	...	Kohlu	Sibi
Grisani Tehsil	174	15,246	87.62	34.40%	Kohlu	Sibi
Sibi Tehsil	1,949	154,970	79.51	52.40%	Sibi	Sibi
Kutmandai Tehsil	1,977	9,748	4.93	8.93%	Sibi	Sibi
Sangan Tehsil	1,378	5,431	3.94	22.67%	Sibi	Sibi
Lehri tehsil	1,817	53,999	29.72	40.79%	Sibi	Sibi
Ziarat Tehsil	1,489	78,912	53.00	54.20%	Ziarat	Sibi
Sinjawi Tehsil	1,812	110,623	61.05	35.88%	Ziarat	Sibi
Dera Bugti Tehsil	927	50,943	54.95	33.75%	Dera Bugti	Sibi
Phelawagh Tehsil	...	...	...	...	Dera Bugti	Sibi
Sui Tehsil	3,858	126,725	32.85	30.59%	Dera Bugti	Sibi
Baiker Tehsil	258	33,410	129.50	15.62%	Dera Bugti	Sibi
Gwadar Tehsil	2,590	147,673	57.02	51.60%	Gwadar	Makran
Jiwani Tehsil	454	35,004	77.10	35.28%	Gwadar	Makran
Ormara Tehsil	2,796	27,832	9.95	49.08%	Gwadar	Makran
Pasni Tehsil	4,822	74,128	15.37	59.71%	Gwadar	Makran
Suntsar Tehsil	1,975	20,523	10.39	31.69%	Gwadar	Makran
Mand Tehsil	1,456	56,772	38.99	54.19%	Kech	Makran
Tump Tehsil	1,945	147,041	75.60	47.17%	Kech	Makran
Turbat Tehsil	9,742	470,605	48.31	63.65%	Kech	Makran
Balnigor Tehsil	1,238	50,404	40.71	38.77%	Kech	Makran
Buleda Tehsil	1,997	107,847	54.00	35.36%	Kech	Makran
Dasht Tehsil	2,486	90,080	36.23	37.25%	Kech	Makran
Hoshab Tehsil	2,213	66,566	30.08	30.71%	Kech	Makran
Zamuran Tehsil	1,462	71,616	48.98	28.97%	Kech	Makran
Gayab Tehsil	...	...	...	...	Kech	Makran
Solband Tehsil	...	...	...	...	Kech	Makran
Gowargo Tehsil	1,471	31,718	21.56	27.57%	Panjgur	Makran
Panjgur Tehsil	2,945	392,277	133.20	46.19%	Panjgur	Makran
Paroom Tehsil	3,378	31,113	9.21	38.64%	Panjgur	Makran
Gichk Tehsil	8,387	33,578	4.00	20.15%	Panjgur	Makran
Kallag Tehsil	710	21,095	29.71	38.40%	Panjgur	Makran
Jaffarabad Tehsil	...	...	...	...	Jafarabad	Nasirabad
Jhatpat Tehsil	690	302,498	438.40	36.70%	Jafarabad	Nasirabad
Gandavah Tehsil	1,344	71,230	53.00	36.35%	Jhal Magsi	Nasirabad
Jhal Magsi Tehsil	1,679	116,528	69.40	26.82%	Jhal Magsi	Nasirabad
Mirpur Tehsil	592	15,610	26.37	24.86%	Jhal Magsi	Nasirabad
Faridabad Tehsil	137	68,948	503.27	41.09%	Sohbatpur	Nasirabad
Hayrvi Tehsil	73	16,891	231.38	42.60%	Sohbatpur	Nasirabad
Manjipur Tehsil	82	23,624	288.10	43.85%	Sohbatpur	Nasirabad
Saeed Muhammad Kanrani Tehsil	77	18,175	236.04	45.90%	Sohbatpur	Nasirabad
Panhwar Tehsil	99	47,624	481.05	35.38%	Sohbatpur	Nasirabad
Sohbatpur Tehsil	334	64,844	194.14	42.30%	Sohbatpur	Nasirabad
Baba Kot Tehsil	967	53,661	55.49	15.41%	Nasirabad	Nasirabad
Dera Murad Jamali	281	265,822	945.99	34.93%	Nasirabad	Nasirabad
Landhi Tehsil	266	8,638	32.47	17.60%	Nasirabad	Nasirabad
Chattar Tehsil	961	32,276	33.59	17.21%	Nasirabad	Nasirabad
Meer Hassan Tesil	229	53,400	233.19	22.99%	Nasirabad	Nasirabad
Tamboo Tehsil	683	149,518	218.91	28.80%	Nasirabad	Nasirabad
Usta Muhammad Tehsil	399	210,870	528.50	38.17%	Usta Muhammad	Nasirabad
Gandakha Tehsil	554	81,190	146.55	24.59%	Usta Muhammad	Nasirabad
Khattan	277	22,900	82.67	41.86%	Kachhi	Nasirabad
Dhadar Tehsil	976	49,836	51.06	45.10%	Kachhi	Nasirabad
Balanari Tehsil	402	60,158	149.65	32.21%	Kachhi	Nasirabad
Bhag Tehsil	1,308	83,687	63.98	35.24%	Kachhi	Nasirabad
Machh Tehsil	708	75,272	106.32	38.80%	Kachhi	Nasirabad
Sani Tehsil	2,011	150,821	75.00	15.58%	Kachhi	Nasirabad
Barshore Tehsil	2,288	141,994	62.06	47.61%	Pishin	Quetta
Hurramzai Tehsil	418	147,844	353.69	39.67%	Pishin	Quetta
Pishin Tehsil	1,199	325,641	271.59	52.50%	Pishin	Quetta
Saranan Tehsil	83	65,157	785.02	48.33%	Pishin	Quetta
Bostan Tehsil	186	49,721	267.32	45.19%	Pishin	Quetta
Chiltan Tehsil	...	...	...	...	Quetta	Quetta
Zarghoon Tehsil	...	...	...	...	Quetta	Quetta
Panjpai Tehsil	1,205	21,371	17.74	37.67%	Quetta	Quetta
Quetta Sadar Tehsil	1,283	330,421	257.54	56.66%	Quetta	Quetta
Kuchlak Tehsil	180	310,246	1,723.59	50.59%	Quetta	Quetta
Sariab Tehsil	221	572,854	2,592.10	42.99%	Quetta	Quetta
Gulistan Tehsil	1,536	126,474	82.34	36.12%	Qilla Abdullah	Quetta
Qilla Abdullah Tehsil	413	165,738	401.30	44.00%	Qilla Abdullah	Quetta
Dobandi Tehsil	1,604	69,759	43.49	18.10%	Qilla Abdullah	Quetta
Karezat Tehsil	1,240	59,756	48.19	74.18%	Karezat	Quetta
Khanozai Tehsil	...	...	...	...	Karezat	Quetta
Killa Saifullah Tehsil	1,103	152,516	138.27	30.77%	Qila Saifullah	Zhob
Loiband Tehsil	972	29,693	30.55	25.81%	Qila Saifullah	Zhob
Muslim Bagh Tehsil	943	83,795	88.86	45.36%	Qila Saifullah	Zhob
Badini Tehsil	985	20,640	20.95	19.15%	Qila Saifullah	Zhob
Kan Mehtarzai	383	34,298	89.55	53.65%	Qila Saifullah	Zhob
Shinki Tehsil	2,445	59,258	24.24	14.93%	Qila Saifullah	Zhob
Qamar Din Karez Tehsil	...	...	...	...	Zhob	Zhob
Zhob Tehsil	9,322	284,620	30.53	41.27%	Zhob	Zhob
Ashwat Tehsil	901	25,094	27.85	14.51%	Zhob	Zhob
Kashatu Tehsil	1,590	5,810	3.65	9.64%	Zhob	Zhob
Sambaza Tehsil	2,888	25,150	8.71	21.65%	Zhob	Zhob
Sherani Tehsil	4,310	191,687	44.47	23.86%	Sherani	Zhob

== List of tehsils by population over the years ==
Tehsil	Population (2023)	Population (2017)	Pop. (1998)	Pop. (1981)	Pop. (1972)	Pop. (1961)	Pop. (1951)	Districts	Division
Awaran Tehsil	45,774	30,345	27,156	...	...	...	...	Awaran	Khuzdar
Gishkaur Tehsil	31,462	18,390	22,430	...	...	...	...	Awaran	Khuzdar
Jhal Jhao Tehsil	28,132	21,491	...	...	...	...	...	Awaran	Khuzdar
Korak Jhao Tehsil	27,652	18,519	...	...	...	...	...	Awaran	Khuzdar
Mashkay Tehsil	45,938	33,076	34,373	...	...	...	...	Awaran	Khuzdar
Gadani Tehsil	29,215	24,593	18,957	12,452	7,104	3,210	...	Hub	Khuzdar
Sonmiani Tehsil	67,991	64,019	31,799	20,675	16,210	8,787	...	Hub	Khuzdar
Hub Tehsil	233,443	205,487	80,934	14,477	10,391	9,042	...	Hub	Khuzdar
Sakran Tehsil	...	...	...	...	...	...	...	Hub	Khuzdar
Dureji Tehsil	52,236	45,541	31,504	25,652	15,389	10,036	...	Hub	Khuzdar
Kalat Tehsil	167,405	121,458	86,565	59,219	50,008	22,185	...	Kalat	Khuzdar
Mangocher Tehsil	80,138	65,678	41,590	27,156	...	...	...	Kalat	Khuzdar
Gazg Tehsil	8,286	5,721	3,979	6,204	...	...	...	Kalat	Khuzdar
Johan Tehsil	15,731	10,708	12,299	21,850	...	...	...	Kalat	Khuzdar
Khuzdar Tehsil	359,358	299,464	161,845	84,115	106,981	52,062	...	Khuzdar	Khuzdar
Nal	103,631	85,249	80,221	60,458	...	...	...	Khuzdar	Khuzdar
Wadh	116,229	100,115	52,333	35,263	39,226	19,152	...	Khuzdar	Khuzdar
Zehri Tehsil	150,928	101,987	38,799	19,143	...	...	...	Khuzdar	Khuzdar
Baghbana Tehsil	...							Khuzdar	Khuzdar
Aranji Tehsil	50,533	42,318	28,561	37,155	...	...	...	Khuzdar	Khuzdar
Gresha Tehsil	69,665	45,648	...	...	...	...	...	Khuzdar	Khuzdar
Karkh Tehsil	35,990	31,016	21,984	17,837	...	...	...	Khuzdar	Khuzdar
Moola Tehsil	32,689	23,386	13,143	8,794	...	...	...	Khuzdar	Khuzdar
Ornach Tehsil	41,811	37,588	20,907	20,772	...	...	...	Khuzdar	Khuzdar
Saroona Tehsil	36,380	32,125	20,580	13,684	...	...	...	Khuzdar	Khuzdar
Uthal Tehsil	88,933	72,290	39,724	32,947	19,146	13,360	...	Lasbela	Khuzdar
Lakhra Tehsil	46,744	35,495	25,474	19,807	14,630	9,727	...	Lasbela	Khuzdar
Bela Tehsil	129,264	104,727	68,341	47,835	32,705	22,073	...	Lasbela	Khuzdar
Kanraj Tehsil	15,996	12,389	8,116	6,287	4,477	2,394	...	Lasbela	Khuzdar
Liari Tehsil	17,155	11,730	7,846	8,007	5,211	4,368	...	Lasbela	Khuzdar
Dasht Mastung Tehsil	67,935							Mastung	Khuzdar
Mastung Tehsil	162,319							Mastung	Khuzdar
Khad Koocha Tehsil	46,316							Mastung	Khuzdar
Kardigap Tehsil	36,701							Mastung	Khuzdar
Dasht e Goran	27,503							Surab	Khuzdar
Gidder	89,631							Surab	Khuzdar
Shaheed meharabad zehri	66,435							Surab	Khuzdar
Surab Tehsil	95,469							Surab	Khuzdar
Dalbandin Tehsil	122,918							Chagai	Rakhshan
Nok Kundi Tehsil	30,625							Chagai	Rakhshan
Taftan Tehsil	19,259							Chagai	Rakhshan
Chagai Tehsil	73,482							Chagai	Rakhshan
Amuri tehsil	...							Chagai	Rakhshan
Chilgazi tehsil	...							Chagai	Rakhshan
Yakmach	22,908							Chagai	Rakhshan
Kharan Tehsil	104,035							Kharan	Rakhshan
Sar-Kharan Tehsil	86,015							Kharan	Rakhshan
Tohumulk Tehsil	49,803							Kharan	Rakhshan
Patkain Tehsil	20,499							Kharan	Rakhshan
Nushki Tehsil	190,905							Nushki	Rakhshan
Dak Tehsil	16,929							Nushki	Rakhshan
Besima Tehsil	63,368							Washuk	Rakhshan
Mashkel Tehsil	67,142							Washuk	Rakhshan
Washuk Tehsil	55,585							Washuk	Rakhshan
Nag Tehsil	57,467							Washuk	Rakhshan
Shahgori Tehsil	59,061							Washuk	Rakhshan
Barkhan Tehsil	210,249	171,025	103,545	61,686	44,704	29,756	...	Barkhan	Loralai
Duki Tehsil	137,294	100,604	...	...	...			Duki	Loralai
Luni Tehsil	13,615	10,235	...	...	...			Duki	Loralai
Talao Tehsil	21,930	18,155	...	...	...			Duki	Loralai
Thal Chutyali Tehsil	32,205	23,983	...	...	...			Duki	Loralai
Bori Tehsil	225,642							Loralai	Loralai
Mekhtar Tehsil	46,790							Loralai	Loralai
Darug Tehsil	21,792							Musakhel	Loralai
Kingri Tehseel	33,618							Musakhel	Loralai
Musakhel Tehsil	49,809							Musakhel	Loralai
Tiyar Essot Tehsil	…							Musakhel	Loralai
Toisar Tehsil	56,818							Musakhel	Loralai
Zimri Plaseen Tehsil	9,670	9,196	...	...	...			Musakhel	Loralai
Chaman Tehsil	130,139							Chaman	Sibi
Chaman Saddar Tehsil	336,079							Chaman	Sibi
Harnai Tehsil	82,001							Harnai	Sibi
Shahrig Tehsil	29,005							Harnai	Sibi
Khost Tehsil	16,565							Harnai	Sibi
Kahan Tehsil	107,840							Kohlu	Sibi
Kohlu Tehsil	48,050							Kohlu	Sibi
Maiwand Tehsil	51,635							Kohlu	Sibi
Tamboo Tehsil	37,449							Kohlu	Sibi
Shaheed Jahangir Abad	...							Kohlu	Sibi
Grisani Tehsil	15,246							Kohlu	Sibi
Sibi Tehsil	154,970							Sibi	Sibi
Kutmandai Tehsil	9,748							Sibi	Sibi
Sangan Tehsil	5,431							Sibi	Sibi
Lehri tehsil	53,999							Sibi	Sibi
Ziarat Tehsil	78,912	67,598	33,340	32,196	17,986	5,274	...	Ziarat	Sibi
Sinjawi Tehsil	110,623	92,497	47,408	30,983	19,702	10,579	...	Ziarat	Sibi
Dera Bugti Tehsil	50,943							Dera Bugti	Sibi
Phelawagh Tehsil	...							Dera Bugti	Sibi
Sui Tehsil	126,725							Dera Bugti	Sibi
Baiker Tehsil	33,410							Dera Bugti	Sibi
Gwadar Tehsil	147,673	137,695	72,614	33,404	27,473	14,304	...	Gwadar	Makran
Jiwani Tehsil	35,004	26,691	19,788	13,619	10,301	4,925	...	Gwadar	Makran
Ormara Tehsil	27,832	25,634	18,848	15,215	9,454	7,829	...	Gwadar	Makran
Pasni Tehsil	74,128	61,347	56,902	39,810	32,610	16,507	...	Gwadar	Makran
Suntsar Tehsil	20,523	10,886	17,346	10,337	10,982	6,096	...	Gwadar	Makran
Mand Tehsil	56,772							Kech	Makran
Tump Tehsil	147,041							Kech	Makran
Turbat Tehsil	470,605							Kech	Makran
Balnigor Tehsil	50,404							Kech	Makran
Buleda Tehsil	107,847							Kech	Makran
Dasht Tehsil	90,080							Kech	Makran
Hoshab Tehsil	66,566							Kech	Makran
Zamuran Tehsil	71,616							Kech	Makran
Gayab Tehsil	...							Kech	Makran
Solband Tehsil	...							Kech	Makran
Gowargo Tehsil	31,718							Panjgur	Makran
Panjgur Tehsil	392,277							Panjgur	Makran
Paroom Tehsil	31,113							Panjgur	Makran
Gichk Tehsil	33,578							Panjgur	Makran
Kallag Tehsil	21,095							Panjgur	Makran
Jaffarabad Tehsil	...							Jafarabad	Nasirabad
Jhatpat Tehsil	302,498	253,107	164,196	79,147	48,561	17,754	...	Jafarabad	Nasirabad
Gandavah Tehsil	71,230							Jhal Magsi	Nasirabad
Jhal Magsi Tehsil	116,528							Jhal Magsi	Nasirabad
Mirpur Tehsil	15,610							Jhal Magsi	Nasirabad
Faridabad Tehsil	68,948							Sohbatpur	Nasirabad
Hayrvi Tehsil	16,891							Sohbatpur	Nasirabad
Manjipur Tehsil	23,624							Sohbatpur	Nasirabad
Saeed Muhammad Kanrani Tehsil	18,175							Sohbatpur	Nasirabad
Panhwar Tehsil	47,624							Sohbatpur	Nasirabad
Sohbatpur Tehsil	64,844							Sohbatpur	Nasirabad
Baba Kot Tehsil	53,661							Nasirabad	Nasirabad
Dera Murad Jamali	265,822							Nasirabad	Nasirabad
Landhi Tehsil	8,638							Nasirabad	Nasirabad
Chattar Tehsil	32,276							Nasirabad	Nasirabad
Meer Hassan Tesil	53,400							Nasirabad	Nasirabad
Tamboo Tehsil	149,518							Nasirabad	Nasirabad
Usta Muhammad Tehsil	210,870	185,984	102,503	61,309	39,595	23,714	...	Usta Muhammad	Nasirabad
Gandakha Tehsil	81,190	74,881	57,727	45,830	34,721	23,983	...	Usta Muhammad	Nasirabad
Khattan	22,900							Kachhi	Nasirabad
Dhadar Tehsil	49,836							Kachhi	Nasirabad
Balanari Tehsil	60,158							Kachhi	Nasirabad
Bhag Tehsil	83,687							Kachhi	Nasirabad
Machh Tehsil	75,272							Kachhi	Nasirabad
Sani Tehsil	150,821							Kachhi	Nasirabad
Barshore Tehsil	141,994							Pishin	Quetta
Hurramzai Tehsil	147,844							Pishin	Quetta
Pishin Tehsil	325,641							Pishin	Quetta
Saranan Tehsil	65,157							Pishin	Quetta
Bostan Tehsil	49,721							Pishin	Quetta
Chiltan Tehsil	...							Quetta	Quetta
Zarghoon Tehsil	...							Quetta	Quetta
Panjpai Tehsil	21,371							Quetta	Quetta
Quetta Sadar Tehsil	330,421							Quetta	Quetta
Kuchlak Tehsil	310,246							Quetta	Quetta
Sariab Tehsil	572,854							Quetta	Quetta
Gulistan Tehsil	126,474							Qilla Abdullah	Quetta
Qilla Abdullah Tehsil	165,738							Qilla Abdullah	Quetta
Dobandi Tehsil	69,759							Qilla Abdullah	Quetta
Karezat Tehsil	59,756							Karezat	Quetta
Khanozai Tehsil	...							Karezat	Quetta
Killa Saifullah Tehsil	152,516							Qila Saifullah	Zhob
Loiband Tehsil	29,693							Qila Saifullah	Zhob
Muslim Bagh Tehsil	83,795							Qila Saifullah	Zhob
Badini Tehsil	20,640							Qila Saifullah	Zhob
Kan Mehtarzai	34,298							Qila Saifullah	Zhob
Shinki Tehsil	59,258							Qila Saifullah	Zhob
Qamar Din Karez Tehsil	...							Zhob	Zhob
Zhob Tehsil	284,620							Zhob	Zhob
Ashwat Tehsil	25,094							Zhob	Zhob
Kashatu Tehsil	5,810							Zhob	Zhob
Sambaza Tehsil	25,150							Zhob	Zhob
Sherani Tehsil	191,687							Sherani	Zhob

== Note ==
- Sub-Tehsils are listed in italics

== See also ==
- List of tehsils of Balochistan, Pakistan by literacy rate
- Tehsils of Pakistan
  - Tehsils of Punjab, Pakistan
  - Tehsils of Khyber Pakhtunkhwa
  - Tehsils of Sindh
  - Tehsils of Azad Kashmir
  - Tehsils of Gilgit-Baltistan
