= Sevi Division =

Administrative Division of Balochistan, Pakistan

Coordinates: 29°29′N 68°31′E

Sevi Division سبي څانګه سبی ولایت تقسیم سبی سبی ڈویژن
- Division
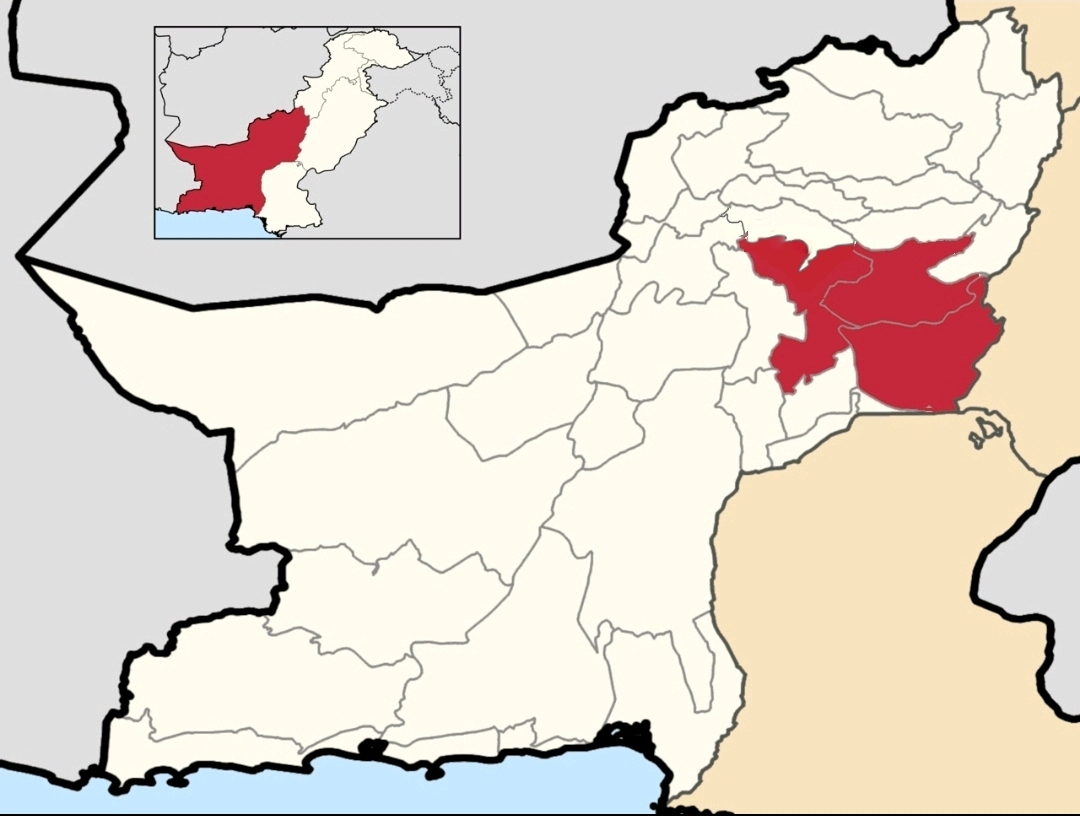
- Map of Sevi Division
- Country: Pakistan
- Province: Balochistan
- Capital: Sibi
- Established: 1974

Government
  - Type: Divisional Administration
  - Commissioner: N/A
  - Regional Police Officer: N/A

Population (2023)
  - Division: 1,156,748
  - Urban: 24.17%
  - Rural: 75.83%

Ethnicities
  - People: Largest: Balochs (61.43%); Others: Pashtuns (29.57%)

Literacy
  - Literacy rate: Total: (34.70%); Male: (42.71 %); Female: (25.85%)

Sevi Division (Balochi: سبی) is a division of Balochistan province of Pakistan. It contains the following districts: This department was established in 1974 in this state. The CNIC Code of Sevi Division is 55.

== History ==
In July 2026, Sevi division was renamed to Sui division and the divisional headquarter is purpose to move Sui city.

== List of the Districts ==
- Sevi District (created 1903)
- Kohlu District (1974)
- Harnai District
- Dera Bugti District (1983)
- Ziarat District
- Kachhi District
- Lehri District (Created 2013 and dissolved 2018)

#	District	Headquarter	Area (km^{2})	Pop. (2023)	Density (ppl/km^{2}) (2023)	Lit. rate (2023)
1	Ziarat	Ziarat	3,301	189,535	57.4	43.37%
2	Harnai	Harnai	2,492	127,571	51.2	39.83%
3	Kohlu	Kohlu	7,610	260,220	34.2	28.53%
4	Dera Bugti	Dera Bugti	10,160	355,274	35.0	24.07%
5	Sevi	Sibi	7,121	224,148	31.5	47.41%
6	Kachhi	Dhadar	5,682	442,674	77.9	30.20%

== List of the Tehsils ==
#	Tehsil	Area (km^{2})	Population (2023)	Density (ppl/km^{2}) (2023)	Literacy rate (2023)	Districts
2	Chaman Saddar Tehsil	1,319	336,079	254.80		
3	Harnai Tehsil	259	82,001	316.61		Harnai
4	Shahrig Tehsil	614	29,005	47.24		Harnai
5	Khoast Tehsil	1,619	16,565	10.23		Harnai
6	Kahan Tehsil	3,754	107,840	28.73		Kohlu
7	Kohlu Tehsil	231	48,050	208.01		Kohlu
8	Maiwand Tehsil	2,915	51,635	17.71		Kohlu
9	Tamboo Tehsil	536	37,449	69.87		Kohlu
10	Shaheed Jahangir Abad tehsil					Kohlu
11	Grisani Tehsil	174	15,246	87.62		Kohlu
12	Sevi Tehsil	1,949	154,970	79.51		Sevi
13	Kutmandai Tehsil	1,977	9,748	4.93		Sevi
14	Sangan Tehsil	1,378	5,431	3.94		Sevi
15	Lehri tehsil	1,817	53,999	29.72		Sevi
16	Ziarat Tehsil	1,489	78,912	53.00		Ziarat
17	Sinjavi Tehsil	1,812	110,623	61.05		Ziarat
18	Dera Bugti Tehsil	927	50,943	54.95		Dera Bugti
19	Phelawagh Tehsil					Dera Bugti
20	Sui Tehsil	3,858	126,725	32.85		Dera Bugti
21	Baiker Tehsil	258	33,410	129.50		Dera Bugti

== Constituencies ==
#	Provincial Assembly Constituency	National Assembly Constituency	District
1	PB-7 Ziarat cum Harnai	NA-253 Ziarat-cum-Harnai-cum-Sibbi-cum-Kohlu-cum-Dera Bugti	Ziarat
1	PB-7 Ziarat cum Harnai	NA-253 Ziarat-cum-Harnai-cum-Sibbi-cum-Kohlu-cum-Dera Bugti	Harnai
2	PB-8 Sibi	NA-253 Ziarat-cum-Harnai-cum-Sibbi-cum-Kohlu-cum-Dera Bugti	Sevi
3	PB-9 Kohlu	NA-253 Ziarat-cum-Harnai-cum-Sibbi-cum-Kohlu-cum-Dera Bugti	Kohlu
4	PB-10 Dera Bugti	NA-253 Ziarat-cum-Harnai-cum-Sibbi-cum-Kohlu-cum-Dera Bugti	Dera Bugti

== Demographics ==
=== Population ===
Historical population
Year	Pop.	±% p.a.
1951	...	—
1961	...	—
1972	...	—
1981	305,768	—
1998	630,901	+4.35%
2017	1,038,010	+2.66%
2023	1,156,748	+1.82%

According to 2023 census, Sevi division had a population of 1,156,748. roughly equal to the country of Estonia or the US state of Montana.

=== Language ===
Languages of Sevi Division (2023)
1. Balochi (61.4%)
2. Pashto (29.6%)
3. Sindhi (4.66%)
4. Saraiki (2.89%)
5. Brahui (0.58%)
6. Urdu (0.40%)
7. Others (0.48%)

According to the 2023 census, the majority languages spoken in Sevi Division are Balochi (61.43%), Pashto (29.58%), Sindhi (4.66%), Saraiki (2.89%), Brahvi (0.58%), Urdu (0.40%) and 0.48% others.

== See also ==
- Districts of Pakistan
  - Districts of Balochistan
- Tehsils of Pakistan
  - Tehsils of Balochistan
- Divisions of Pakistan
  - Divisions of Balochistan
  - Divisions of Khyber Pakhtunkhwa
  - Divisions of Punjab
  - Divisions of Sindh
  - Divisions of Azad Kashmir
  - Divisions of Gilgit-Baltistan
