= South Balochistan Province =

Proposed autonomous state in Pakistan

South Balochistan (Makran) جنوبی بلوچستان
- Proposed Province
- Proposed area of South Balochistan province
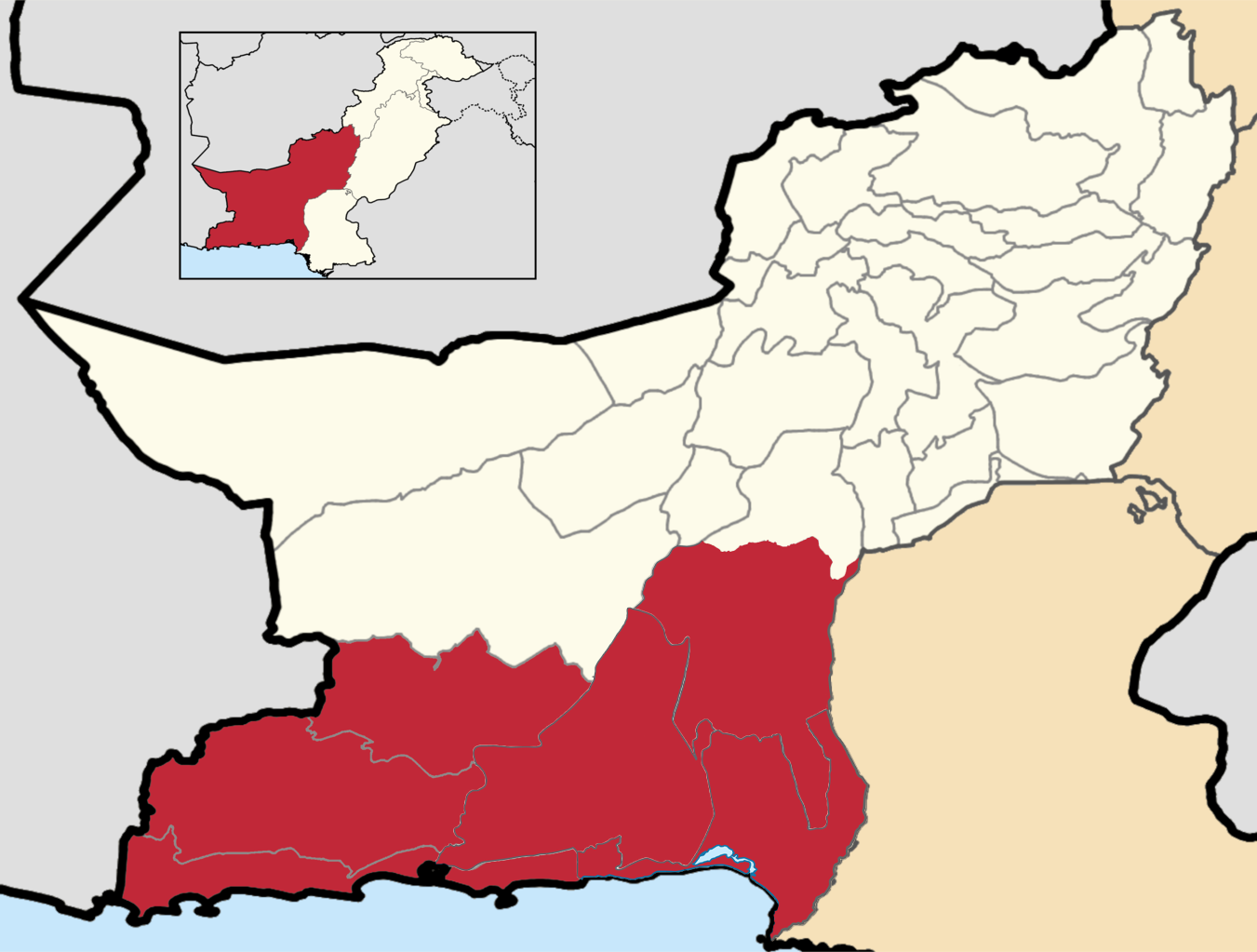
- Red (Proposed regions),
- Country: Pakistan
- Capital: Gwadar
- Largest city: Turbat

Government
  - Type: Self-governing province subject to the federal government
  - Body: Government of south Balochistan
  - Governor: Vacant
  - Chief Minister: Vacant
  - Chief Secretary: Vacant

Area
  - Total: 117,142 km^{2} (45,229 sq mi)
  - Rank: N/A

Population (2023)
  - Total: 3,153,786
- Time zone: UTC+05:00 (PST)
- Seats in National Assembly: 3
- Seats in Provincial Assembly: 11
- Divisions: 03
- Districts: 12
- Tehsils: 39

South Balochistan (Urdu: جنوبی بلوچستان) is a proposed new province of Pakistan, comprising the areas Makran and Lasbela in the southern part of Balochistan province. Made up of Makran Division and Kalat Division (some district of Kalat division), the proposed South Balochistan forms about 42 percent of the total area and 32 percent of the population of Balochistan province.

== Division ==
1. Gwadar
2. Khuzdar
3. Lasbela
4. Makran (or Kech Division)

== District ==
1. Awaran District
2. Tump District (established 2026)
3. Gwadar District
4. Hub District
5. Kech District
6. Hoshab District (Proposed District)
7. Lasbela District
8. Ormara District (Proposed District)
9. Punjgur District
10. Wadh District (established 2026)
11. Buleda District (Proposed District)
12. Dasht District (Proposed District)

== List of the Tehsils ==
Tehsil	Area (km²)	Population (2023)	Density (ppl/km²) (2023)	Literacy rate (2023)	Districts
Awaran Tehsil	13,075	45,774	3.50	42.90%	Awaran
Gishkaur Tehsil	4,578	31,462	6.87	36.34%	Awaran
Jhal Jhao Tehsil	6,381	28,132	4.41	26.62%	Awaran
Korak Jhao Tehsil	3,058	27,652	9.04	26.71%	Awaran
Mashkay Tehsil	2,418	45,938	19.00	41.21%	Awaran
Gadani Tehsil	419	29,215	69.73	48.57%	Hub
Sonmiani Tehsil	2,616	67,991	25.99	35.80%	Hub
Hub Tehsil	868	233,443	268.94	44.35%	Hub
Sakran Tehsil	...	...	...	...	Hub
Dureji Tehsil	2,813	52,236	18.57	15.58%	Hub
Saroona Tehsil	3,257	36,380	11.17	24.22%	
Uthal Tehsil	1,756	88,933	50.65	33.95%	Lasbela
Lakhra Tehsil	1,954	46,744	23.92	15.31%	Lasbela
Bela Tehsil	1,527	129,264	84.65	40.98%	Lasbela
Kanraj Tehsil	1,190	15,996	13.44	20.32%	Lasbela
Liari Tehsil	2,010	17,155	8.53	16.09%	Lasbela
Gwadar Tehsil	2,590	147,673	57.02		Gwadar
Jiwani Tehsil	454	35,004	77.10		Gwadar
Ormara Tehsil	2,796	27,832	9.95		Gwadar
Pasni Tehsil	4,822	74,128	15.37		Gwadar
Suntsar Tehsil	1,975	20,523	10.39		Gwadar
Turbat Tehsil	9,742	470,605	48.31		Kech
Balnigor Tehsil	1,238	50,404	40.71		Kech
Buleda Tehsil	1,997	107,847	54.00		Kech
Dasht Tehsil	2,486	90,080	36.23		Kech
Zamuran Tehsil	1,462	71,616	48.98		Kech
Gayab Tehsil	...	...	...		Kech
Solband Tehsil	...	...	...		Kech
Gowargo Tehsil	1,471	31,718	21.56		Panjgur
Panjgur Tehsil	2,945	392,277	133.20		Panjgur
Paroom Tehsil	3,378	31,113	9.21		Panjgur
Gichk Tehsil	8,387	33,578	4.00		Panjgur
Tump Tehsil	1,945	147,041	75.60		Tump
Mand Tehsil	1,456	56,772	38.99		Tump

== Educational Institutions ==
The division is evolving into an educational hub for southern Balochistan. Key institutions include:

- Lasbela University of Agriculture, Water and Marine Sciences (LUAWMS) in Uthal.
- LUAWMS Inter College, Uthal.
- Government Degree College, Uthal.
- Government Degree College, Bela.
- Government Degree College, Hub.
- Balochistan College of Education, Hub.
- The Hub Cadet College.
- Pak-German Technical Training Institute, Hub.
- LUAWMS Awaran Sub-Campus, Awaran.
- Cadet College Awaran
- Government Boys Degree College, Awaran.
- Government Girls Inter College, Awaran.
- University of Gwadar, Gwadar
- Pakistan China Voccational Trainig Center, Gwadar.
- Government Post Graduates College, Gwadar.
- Cadet College Ormara.
- University of Kech, Turbat.
- Makran Medical College, Makran.
- University of Makran, Pamjgur.
- Various public technical and vocational training institutes designed to support the local industrial estates.
