= 26 August 2021 Balochistan attacks =

Attacks in Ziarat and Panjgur, Balochistan

- Part of the Balochistan conflict
- Location: Ziarat and Panjgur districts, Balochistan, Pakistan
- Date: 26 August 2021
- Target: Security personnel
- Attack type: Bombing, Shooting
- Deaths: 4
- Injuries: 6
- Perpetrator: Unknown terrorist group

On 26 August 2021, four security personnel were killed and six others were injured in attacks by terrorists in Balochistan's Ziarat and Panjgur districts.

== Ziarat explosion ==
The Levies Force had received reports of the abduction of four workers working on the Mangi Dam. A Levies Force team launched a search operation to rescue the workers. However, a Levies officer hit a landmine while chasing the kidnappers' vehicle. The blast killed three Levies and injured three others in the other vehicle. The kidnappers released the two workers when Levies began chasing them.

=== Protests ===
The heirs of the Levies martyrs, the people of Ziarat, Harnai, Sanjawi and various political parties and tribes placed the bodies on the main highway near Kuch Mor, Ziarat, Quetta and closed the highway to all kinds of traffic. Traffic on the main national highway of North Balochistan remained suspended for hours. The protesters said that the bodies would not be buried till the formation of the Judicial Commission. Passengers traveling to and from Quetta from Ziarat, Sanjawi, Dakki, Kohlu, Harnai, Shahrag and Loralai, especially women, children, the elderly, the disabled and transporters are faced severe difficulties.

Shutter down strikes was also held in Ziarat, Muslim Bagh, Khanozai, Qila Saifullah, Zhob and Loralai, Markets and markets remained closed.

== Panjgur attack ==
A man of Frontier Corps (FC) was killed and three others were injured in the Guargu area of Panjgur District by unknown assailants when an FC vehicle passing through the area. The injured were shifted to Panjgur District Hospital.

== See also ==
- Terrorist incidents in Pakistan in 2021
