= Loralai Division =

Administrative division of Balochistan, Pakistan

Loralai Division بخش لورالای
- Division
- Country: Pakistan
- Province: Balochistan
- Capital: Loralai
- Established: 2021

Government
  - Type: Divisional Administration
  - Commissioner: N/A
  - Regional Police Officer: N/A

Population (2023)
  - Division: 1,152,400
  - Urban: 543,321 (39.43%)
  - Rural: 609,079 (60.57%)

Ethnicities
  - People: Largest: Pashtuns (75%); Baloch: Balochs (21%); Others: Others (4%)

Literacy
  - Literacy rate: Total: (51.89%); Male: (54.90%); Female: (28.88%)
- Website: loralai.balochistan.gov.pk

Loralai Division is an administrative division of Balochistan Province, Pakistan. It was bifurcated from Zhob division in 2021. The division consists of Barkhan, Loralai, Musakhail and Duki districts. CNIC code of Loralai Division is 56.

== Demographics ==
=== Population ===
Historical population
Year	Pop.	±% p.a.
1951	...	—
1961	...	—
1972	...	—
1981	...	—
1998	309,748	—
2017	898,209	+5.76%
2023	1,152,400	+4.24%

According to the 2023 census, Loralai Division had a population of 1,152,400. roughly equal to the country of Mauritius or the US state of South Dakota.

== Districts ==
District	Headquarter	Area (km²)	Pop. (2023)	Density (ppl/km²) (2023)	Lit. rate (2023)
Barkhan	Barkhan	3,514	268,249	72.8	33.62%
Duki	Duki	4,233	289,044	54.4	44.18%
Musakhel	Musa Khel Bazar	5,728	196,275	38.8	38.60%
Loralai	Loralai	3,785	398,832	102.0	64.16%

== Tehsils ==
Tehsil	Area (km²)	Population (2023)	Density (ppl/km²) (2023)	Literacy rate (2023)	Districts
Barkhan Tehsil	3,514	268,249	72.83	33.62%	Barkhan
Duki Tehsil	938	212,546	146.37	50.48%	Duki
Luni Tehsil	553	15,363	24.62	33.80%	Duki
Talao Tehsil	1,697	21,930	12.92	21.41%	Duki
Thal Chutyali Tehsil	1,045	39,205	30.82	38.10%	Duki
Bori Tehsil	2,203	331,298	102.42	64.82%	Loralai
Mekhtar Tehsil	1,582	67,534	29.58	36.55%	Loralai
Darug Tehsil	301	26,792	72.40	59.37%	Musakhel
Kingri Tehseel	3,683	41,950	9.13	45.37%	Musakhel
Musakhel Tehsil	658	64,425	75.70	41.51%	Musakhel
Tiyar Essot Tehsil	299	18,568	35.34	24.71%	Musakhel
Toisar Tehsil	539	29,966	105.41	26.06%	Musakhel
Zimri Plaseen Tehsil	248	14,574	38.99	15.02%	Musakhel

== Constituencies ==
#	Provincial Assembly Constituency	National Assembly Constituency	District
1	PB-4 Musakhel-cum-Barkhan	NA-252 Musakhel-cum-Barkhan-cum-Loralai-cum-Duki	Musakhel
1	PB-4 Musakhel-cum-Barkhan	NA-252 Musakhel-cum-Barkhan-cum-Loralai-cum-Duki	Barkhan
2	PB-5 Loralai	NA-252 Musakhel-cum-Barkhan-cum-Loralai-cum-Duki	Loralai
3	PB-6 Duki	NA-252 Musakhel-cum-Barkhan-cum-Loralai-cum-Duki	Duki

== Demographics ==
=== Population ===
Historical population
Year	Pop.	±% p.a.
1951	...	—
1961	...	—
1972	...	—
1981	...	—
1998	...	—
2017	...	—
2023	1,152,400	—

According to the 2023 census, Loralai division had a population of 1,152,400.

== See also ==
- Districts of Pakistan
  - Districts of Balochistan
- Tehsils of Pakistan
  - Tehsils of Balochistan
- Divisions of Pakistan
  - Divisions of Balochistan
  - Divisions of Khyber Pakhtunkhwa
  - Divisions of Punjab
  - Divisions of Sindh
  - Divisions of Azad Kashmir
  - Divisions of Gilgit-Baltistan
