= List of dialling codes in Pakistan =

Telephone numbers in Pakistan
- Country: Pakistan
- Continent: Asia
- Regulator: Pakistan Telecommunication Authority
- Country code: +92
- International access: 00
- Long-distance: 0

== Fixed telephony ==
The area codes in Pakistan consists of two to five digits; generally smaller the city, longer the prefix. All large cities have two-digit codes. The smaller towns might have six digital whereas big cities have seven digit numbers. Azad Kashmir telephone lines contain five digits. On 1 July 2009, telephone numbers in Karachi and Lahore were changed from seven digits to eight digits. This was accomplished by adding 9 to the beginning of all phone numbers that started with a 9 i.e. government and semi-government lines and adding 3 to all other lines.

The following is the list of dialling codes for various cities and districts in Pakistan.

District	Code
Abbottabad	92
Attock	57
Awaran	856
Badin	297
Bahawalnagar	63
Bahawalpur	62
Bajaur	942
Bannu	928
Barkhan/Kohlu	829
Bhakkar	453
Bhimber	5828
Faisalabad	41
Bahawalnagar	63
Bahawalpur	62
Besham	996
Bolan	832
Chagai	825
Chiniot	47
Chitral	943
Dera Bugti	835
Dera Ghazi Khan	64
Dera Ismail Khan	966
Dinga	537
Gujranwala	55
Gujrat	53
Gwadar	86
Hafizabad	547
Haripur, Pakistan	995
Hyderabad	22
Islamabad	51
Jaffarabad	838
Jhal Magsi	837
Jhang	477
Jhelum	544
Kalat	844
Karachi	21
Kasur	49
Kech (Turbat)	852
Khanewal	65
Khushab	454
Kharan	847
Khuzdar	848
Kohlu	829
Lahore	42
Lahore	43
Larkana	74
Lasbela	853
Layyah	606
Swat	946
Lodhran	608
Loralai	824
Mandi Bahauddin	546
Mardan	937
Mastung	843
Mianwali	459
Multan	61
Musakhel	828
Muzaffargarh	66
Nankana Sahib	56
Narowal	542
Naseerabad	838
Nowshera	923
Okara	44
Pakpattan	457
Panjgur	855
Parachinar	926
Peshawar	91
Pishin	826
Qilla Abdullah	826
Qilla Saifullah	823
Quetta	81
Rahim Yar Khan	68
Rajanpur	604
Rawalpindi	51
Sahiwal	40
Sargodha	48
Shakargarh	542
Sheikhupura	56
Sialkot	52
Sibi/Ziarat	833
Surab	844
South Waziristan	965
Sukkur	71
Swabi	938
Swat	946
Talagang	5776
Tank	963
Tharparkar	232
Thatta	298
Toba Tek Singh	46
Umerkot	238
Vehari	67
Zhob	822
Ziarat	833

== See also ==
- Telephone numbers in Pakistan

329
