= Kahan, Pakistan =

Kahan کاہان
- Village
- Location within Balochistan, Pakistan Location within Pakistan
- Coordinates: 29.2982°N 68.9023°E
- Country: Pakistan
- Province: Balochistan
- Division: Sibi Division
- District: Kohlu District
- Tehsil: Kahan Tehsil
- Time zone: UTC+5 (PST)

Kahan is a village in Kohlu District in Pakistan's Balochistan province.

It is bounded by Kohlu to the north, Barkhan to the North East, Dera Bugti to the East and South East, Sibbi to the west and South West, and Loralai in the west and North West. Tracks exist leading to Kohlu, Dera Bugti, and Sibi. Electricity to the village is provided by a generator and a telephone connection is available. The mainstay of population is farming, but there are also a few shops providing daily necessities.

Kahan is the traditional centre of the Marri tribe, and the former residence of the tribe's sardar. The village had largely been depopulated in the 1950s after a series of droughts and political shifts involving the move of the sardar to Quetta and the establishment of Kohlu as an administrative centre. Kahan is the native village of politician Khair Bakhsh Marri.

Kahan tehsil had a total population of 73,981 in 2017.

== See also ==
- Siege of Kahun
