= Sanerzai =

Pakistani Ethnicity

The Sanerzai, a sub-tribe of the Essakhail Kakar, reside in the northern region of Ziarat Valley, Balochistan, Pakistan. Despite being smaller in population compared to other tribes in Ziarat, they hold a prominent position in the district. The tribe derives its name from its ancestor, Saner Khan, while their first forefather to settle in Ziarat was Musa Khan, also known as Musa Neka. He migrated from the Essakhail tribe of Muslim Bagh to Ziarat in 1761, following Ahmad Shah Abdali's return from the Third Battle of Panipat. The Sanerzai primarily inhabit Chawatra, renowned for its Sandman Tangi waterfall.
