= Duki District =

Coordinates: 30°9′0″N 68°34′0″E

Duki District ضلع دوکی دوکي ولسوالۍ
- District of Balochistan
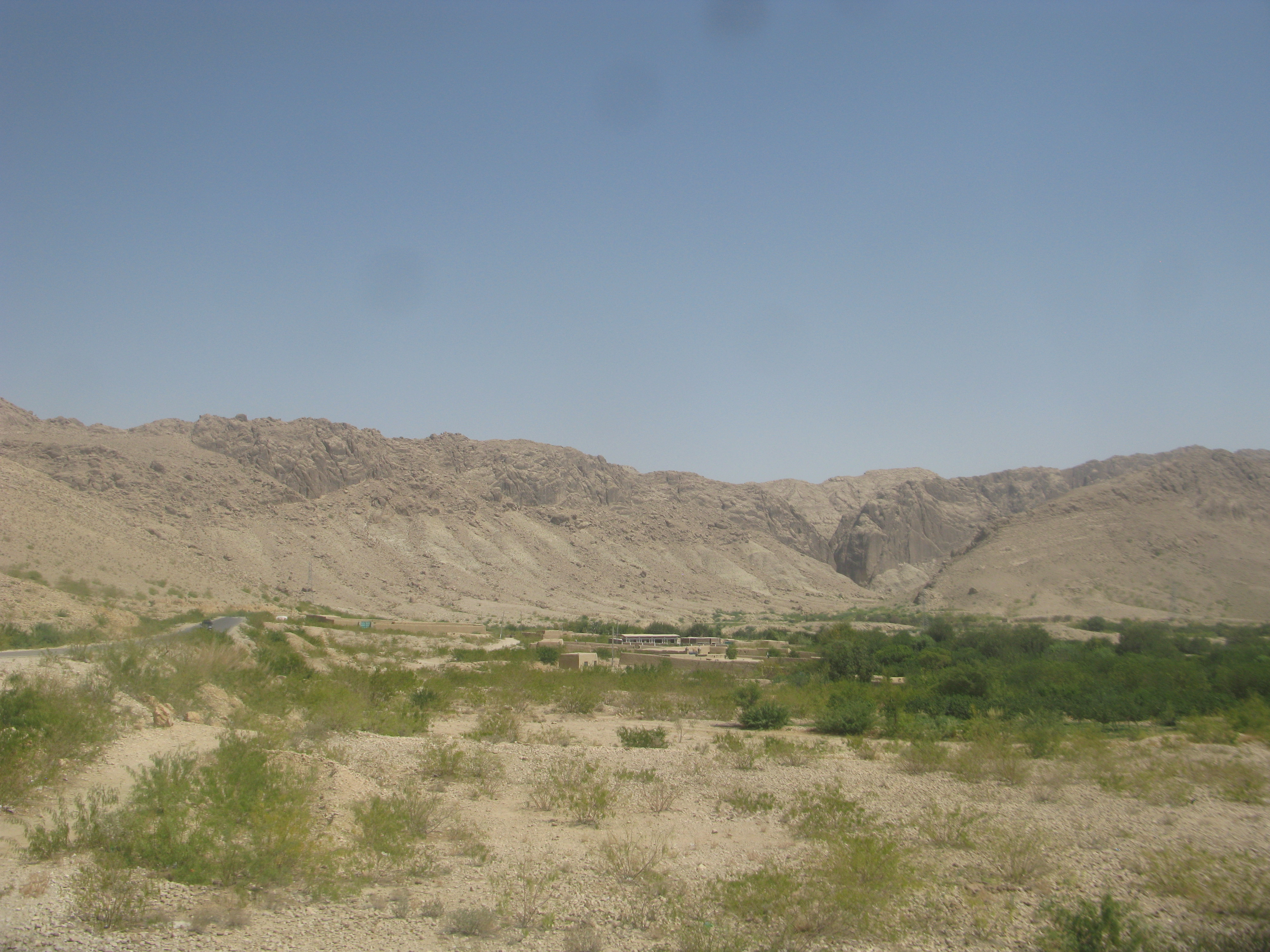
- Hairan Haiderzai Mound

- Map of Balochistan with Duki District highlighted
- Country: Pakistan
- Province: Balochistan
- Division: Loralai
- Established: 2016
- Headquarters: Duki

Government
  - Type: District Administration
  - Deputy Commissioner: Barkat Ali Baloch
  - District Police Officer: Syed Asim Shafi
  - District Health Officer: N/A

Area
  - District of Balochistan: 4,233 km^{2} (1,634 sq mi)

Population (2023)
  - District of Balochistan: 205,044
  - Density: 48.44/km^{2} (125.5/sq mi)
  - Urban: 9,783
  - Rural: 195,261

Literacy
  - Literacy rate: Total: (44.18%); Male: (53.91%); Female: (33.43%)
- Time zone: UTC+5 (PKT)

Duki (Urdu: ضلع دوکی) is a district in the Balochistan province of Pakistan. Pashto is the most spoken language in Duki District.

== Administration ==
Tehsil	Area (km²)	Pop. (2023)	Density (ppl/km²) (2023)	Literacy rate (2023)	Union Councils
Duki Tehsil	938	137,294	146.37	50.48%	...
Luni Tehsil	553	13,615	24.62	33.80%	...
Talao Tehsil	1,697	21,930	12.92	21.41%	...
Thal Chutyali Tehsil	1,045	32,205	30.82	38.10%	...

== Demographics ==
Historical population
Year	Pop.	±% p.a.
1951	N/A	—
1961	N/A	—
1972	N/A	—
1981	N/A	—
1998	115,976	—
2017	152,977	+1.47%
2023	205,044	+5.00%

As of the 2023 census, Duki district has 43,059 households and a population of 205,044. The district has a sex ratio of 109.66 males to 100 females and a literacy rate of 44.18%: 53.91% for males and 33.43% for females. 67,333 (32.84% of the surveyed population) are under 10 years of age. 9,783 (4.77%) live in urban areas.

=== Religion ===
Religion in contemporary Duki District
Religious group	1941		2017		2023	
Religious group	Pop.	%	Pop.	%	Pop.	%
Islam	19,216	98.04%	152,771	99.87%	204,086	99.53%
Hinduism	356	1.82%	47	0.03%	39	0.02%
Christianity	26	0.13%	116	0.08%	799	0.39%
Others	2	0.01%	43	0.02%	120	0.06%
Total Population	19,600	100%	152,977	100%	205,044	100%
Note: 1941 census data is for Duki tehsil of erstwhile Loralai Agency, which roughly corresponds to contemporary Duki district. District and tehsil borders have changed since 1941.

=== Language ===
Languages of Duki district (2023)
1. Pashto (93.3%)
2. Balochi (4.85%)
3. Brahui (0.69%)
4. Others (1.19%)

At the time of the 2023 census, 93.27% of the population spoke Pashto, 4.85% Balochi, and 0.69% Brahui as their first language.

== See also ==
- Districts of Pakistan
  - Districts of Khyber Pakhtunkhwa, Pakistan
  - Districts of Punjab, Pakistan
  - Districts of Balochistan, Pakistan
  - Districts of Sindh, Pakistan
  - Districts of Azad Kashmir
  - Districts of Gilgit-Baltistan
- Tehsils of Pakistan
  - Tehsils of Balochistan
- Divisions of Pakistan
  - Divisions of Balochistan
