= Khuda e Dad Sheher =

Village in Pakistan

Khuda e Dad Sheher is a small village in Kohlu district in the Balochistan province of Pakistan.

It is named after Mir Khudaidad Khan Marri, who established the village.
