= Sandman Tangi =

- Village and union council
- Country: Pakistan
- Region: Balochistan
- District: Ziarat District
- Time zone: UTC+5 (PST)

Sandeman Tangi is a village and union council of Ziarat District in the Balochistan province of Pakistan. The village was named after British administrator, Robert Groves Sandeman. It is 4 km from Ziarat and contains a dramatic waterfall cascading down the rocks which is an attraction for visitors. The waterfall was earlier known as Droond Tangai. Many believed that ghosts lived there.
