= Sanjawi =

Town in Balochistan, Pakistan

Sanjawi سنځاوۍ
- City
- Location within Pakistan Location within Balochistan, Pakistan
- Coordinates: 30°15′57″N 68°18′45″E
- Country: Pakistan
- Province: Balochistan
- District: Ziarat
- Tehsil: Sanjawi

Population (2023)
  - Total: 45,539
- Time zone: UTC+5 (PST)

Sanjawi (Pashto: سنځاوۍ), also spelled Sanzawi or Sinjawi, is a town in Balochistan, Pakistan, with a population of 124,000. It serves as the capital of Sanjawi Tehsil – an administrative subdivision of Ziarat District.

Balochi and Wanetsi (Tareeno), which is a unique and archaic dialect of Pashto, are spoken in the town.

Sanjawi is located about 32 km (20 mi) from Loralai, and 192 km (120 miles) from provincial capital Quetta.

== Demographics ==
=== Population ===
Historical population
Year	Pop.	±% p.a.
1951	...	—
1961	...	—
1972	...	—
1981	...	—
1998	...	—
2017	...	—
2023	45,539	—

As of the 2023 census, Sanjawi has a population of 45,539.

Languages

Languages of Sanjawi (2023 Census)
1. Pashto (97.1%)
2. Saraiki (1.21%)
3. Balochi (0.67%)
4. Punjabi (0.53%)
5. Urdu (0.23%)
6. Others (0.26%)

== Notable people ==
- Sardar Ehsanullah Dumar
- Arman Loni
- Wranga Loni
