= Regorah =

- Town and union council
- Country: Pakistan
- Region: Balochistan
- District: Ziarat District
- Time zone: UTC+5 (PST)

Regorah is a town and union council of Ziarat District in the Balochistan province of Pakistan.
