= Kharan Tehsil =

Kharan Tehsil تحصیل خاران
- Tehsil
- Location within Balochistan, Pakistan Location within Pakistan
- Coordinates: 28°35′0″N 65°25′0″E
- Country: Pakistan
- Province: Balochistan
- Division: Rakhshan
- District: Kharan
- Headquarter: Kharan

Area
  - Tehsil: 2,941 km^{2} (1,136 sq mi)
- Elevation: 692 m (2,270 ft)

Population (2023)
  - Tehsil: 104,035
  - Density: 35.37/km^{2} (91.62/sq mi)
  - Urban: 80,806 (77.67%)
  - Rural: 23,229 (22.33%)

Literacy (2023)
  - Literacy rate: Total: (48.63%); Male: (59.17%); Female: (36.60%)
- Time zone: UTC+5 (PST)

Kharan (Balochi: ھاران; Urdu: خاران) is a tehsil (sub-division) in Kharan District, Balochistan, Pakistan. It is located at 28°35'0N 65°25'0E with an altitude of 692 metres (2273 feet). It is populated by many Baloch clans. Former Federal Shariat Court and Balochistan High Court chief justice Mohammad Noor Meskanzai belongs to this tehsil.

== Demographics ==
=== Population ===
Historical population
Year	Pop.	±% p.a.
1951	...	—
1961	...	—
1972	...	—
1981	...	—
1998	...	—
2017	66,438	—
2023	104,035	+7.76%

As of the 2023 census, Kharan tehsil had 14,023 households and a population of 104,035. The tehsil had 56,659 males and 47,370 females with sex ration of 120 and a literacy rate of 48.63%: 59.17% for males and 36.60% for females. 41,997 (40.36% of the surveyed population) are under 10 years of age. 80,806 (77.67%) live in urban areas. As per the 2017 Census of Pakistan, the population of the tehsil was recorded as 66,438.

=== Religion ===
Religions in Kharan tehsil (2023)
Religion	Percent
Islam	97.80%
Hinduism	1.83%
Other	0.37%

In the 2023 census, 2,263 (2.20%) people in the tehsil were from religious minorities, mainly Hindus.

Languages of Kharan tehsil (2023)
1. Balochi (88.4%)
2. Brahui (11.3%)
3. Others (0.34%)

=== Language ===
At the time of the 2023 census, 88.39% of the population spoke Balochi and 11.27% Brahui as their first language.

== See also ==
- Tehsils of Pakistan
  - Tehsils of Balochistan
- Districts of Pakistan
  - Districts of Balochistan
- Divisions of Pakistan
  - Divisions of Balochistan
