= Kahan Tehsil =

Kahan Tehsil تحصیل کاہان
- Tehsil
- Location within Balochistan, Pakistan Location within Pakistan
- Coordinates: 29.2982°N 68.9023°E
- Country: Pakistan
- Province: Balochistan
- Division: Sibi Division
- District: Kohlu District
- Headquarter: Kahan

Area
  - Tehsil: 3,754 km^{2} (1,449 sq mi)

Population (2023)
  - Tehsil: 107,840
  - Density: 28.73/km^{2} (74.40/sq mi)
  - Rural: 107,840 (100%)

Literacy (2023)
  - Literacy rate: 19.87%
- Time zone: UTC+5 (PST)

Kahan is a tehsil (sub-division) in Kohlu District in Balochistan province of Pakistan.

== Demographics ==
=== Population ===
Historical population
Year	Pop.	±% p.a.
1951	...	—
1961	19,871	—
1972	24,830	+2.05%
1981	34,085	+3.58%
1998	26,765	−1.41%
2017	73,833	+5.49%
2023	107,840	+6.52%

As of the 2023 census, Kahan tehsil had a population of 107,840. The tehsil had a literacy rate of 19.87%: 21.39% for males and 17.99% for females.

== See also ==
- Districts of Pakistan
  - Districts of Balochistan, Pakistan
- Tehsils of Pakistan
  - Tehsils of Balochistan
- Divisions of Pakistan
  - Divisions of Balochistan
