= Khost, Pakistan =

Coordinates: 30°13′24″N 67°34′38″E

- Town and union council
- Interactive map of Khost, Pakistan
- Country: Pakistan
- Region: Balochistan
- District: Harnai District
- Time zone: UTC+5 (PST)

Khost is a town and union council of Harnai District in the Balochistan province of Pakistan. It is located at 30°13'24N 67°34'38E and has an altitude of 1229m (4035ft).
