= Sanjawi Tehsil =

Sanjawi Tehsil سنځاوۍ تحصیل سنجاوی تحصیل
- Tehsil
- Country: Pakistan
- Province: Balochistan
- District: Ziarat

Government
  - Notables: Sardar Ehsanullah Dummar; Haji Habib Rahman Dummar

Area
  - Tehsil: 1,812 km^{2} (700 sq mi)

Population (2023)
  - Tehsil: 110,623
  - Density: 61.05/km^{2} (158.1/sq mi)
  - Urban: 45,539 (41.17%)
  - Rural: 65,084 (58.83%)

Literacy (2023)
  - Literacy rate: 35.88%
- Time zone: UTC+5 (PST)
- Number of Union Councils: 5

Sanjawi Tehsil (Pashto: سنځاوۍ; pronounced Sanzāwə́i locally) is an administrative subdivision (tehsil) of Ziarat District in the Balochistan province of Pakistan. The tehsil is administratively subdivided into five Union Councils and is headquartered at the city of Sanjawi.

The population belongs to Dummar, Syed (Taran)Andar, Sulaimankhel (سليمان خېل), Pechi, Zakhpel, Nasar, Kharoti, and Tarin tribes.

== Demographics ==
=== Population ===
According to the 2023 census, the population of Sanjawi Tehsil is 110,623 which is spread across 12,073 households. The overall literacy rate stands at 35.88% with notable gender gap: 43.68% among men and just 27.30% among women. These figures reflect ongoing challenges in access to education, particularly for girls and women in rural areas.

Historical population
Year	Pop.	±% p.a.
1951	...	—
1961	10,579	—
1972	19,702	+5.82%
1981	30,983	+5.16%
1998	47,408	+2.53%
2017	92,497	+3.58%
2023	110,623	+3.03%
Sources: Pakistan Bureau of Statistics:

=== Languages ===
Pashto is the predominant language in the tehsil, spoken by approximately 108,806 individuals (~98.36% of the population). A small portion of the population speaks other local languages.

== Towns ==
Sanjawi Tehsil consists of the following villages:

- Chelaiz Khalil
- Uzhlaiz
- Regora
- Zara Sanzavi (old Sanjavi)
- Poi Shareef
- Aghbarg
- Bghaow
- Chawter (چوتېر)
- Tor Waam
- Lawangabad
- Sinn Gharra
- Arbusi
- Khrashang
- Lawang Abad
- Tand Wani
- Asghara
- Petawo
- Pasra
- Bayya
- Nusk
- Givarri
- Jilga
- Thakary
- Maraty
- Inzargat
- Narai Dag
- Shereen
- Ghunza
- Shinlaiz
- Ghairkhwa
- Sara Khaizai
- Oach Wany
- Kaazha
- Kanderha
- Salam
- Androbai

== See also ==
- List of cities in Pakistan by population
  - List of cities in Balochistan by population
- Tehsils of Pakistan
  - Tehsils of Balochistan, Pakistan
- Districts of Pakistan
  - Districts of Balochistan, Pakistan
- Divisions of Pakistan
  - Divisions of Balochistan, Pakistan
