= Duki Tehsil =

Pakistani administrative area

Duki Tehsil تحصیل دوکی
- Tehsil
- Interactive map of Duki Tehsil
- Country: Pakistan
- Province: Balochistan
- Division: Loralai
- District: Duki District
- Headquarters: Duki
- Established: 2016

Government
  - Type: Tehsil Administration
  - Assistent Commissioner: ...
  - Tehsil Police Officer: ...
  - Tehsil Health Officer: ...

Area
  - Tehsil: 938 km^{2} (362 sq mi)

Population (2023)
  - Tehsil: 137,294
  - Density: 146/km^{2} (379/sq mi)
  - Urban: 9,783 (7.13%)
  - Rural: 127,511 (92.87%)

Literacy
  - Literacy rate: Total: (50.48%); Male: (60.65%); Female: (39.14%)
- Time zone: UTC+5 (PKT)

Duki (Urdu: تحصیل دوکی) is an administrative subdivision(tehsil) in Duki District of the Balochistan province of Pakistan.

== Demographics ==
=== Population ===
As of the 2023 census, Duki tehsil had a population of 137,294. The tehsil had a sex ratio of 109.66 males to 100 females and a literacy rate of 50.48%: 60.65% for males and 39.14% for females. 46,409 (33.81% of the surveyed population) are under 10 years of age. 9,783 (7.13%) live in urban areas.

Historical population
Year	Pop.	±% p.a.
1951	...	—
1961	22,772	—
1972	42,751	+5.89%
1981	106,168	+10.64%
1998	115,976	+0.52%
2017	100,604	−0.75%
2023	137,294	+5.32%

== See also ==
- Districts of Pakistan
  - Districts of Balochistan, Pakistan
- Tehsils of Pakistan
  - Tehsils of Balochistan
- Divisions of Pakistan
  - Divisions of Balochistan
