= Ziarat Tehsil =

Ziarat
- Tehsil
- Country: Pakistan
- Province: Balochistan
- District: Ziarat
- Capital: Ziarat

Area
  - Tehsil: 1,489 km^{2} (575 sq mi)

Population (2023)
  - Tehsil: 78,912
  - Density: 53.00/km^{2} (137.3/sq mi)
  - Urban: 3,863 (4.90%)
  - Rural: 75,049 (95.10%)

Literacy (2023)
  - Literacy rate: 54.20%
- Time zone: UTC+5 (PST)
- Number of towns: 1
- Number of Union Councils: 7

Ziarat Tehsil is an administrative subdivision (tehsil) of Ziarat District in the Balochistan province of Pakistan. The tehsil is administratively subdivided into five Union Councils and is headquartered at the city of Ziarat.

== Population ==
Historical population
Year	Pop.	±% p.a.
1951	...	—
1961	5,274	—
1972	17,986	+11.80%
1981	32,196	+6.68%
1998	33,340	+0.21%
2017	67,598	+3.79%
2023	78,912	+2.61%
Sources:Source: Pakistan Bureau of Statistics:

According to 2023 census, Population of Ziarat Tehsil was 78,912 which was spread across 10,821 households. The overall literacy rate stands at 54.20% with notable gender gap: 67.94% among men and just 41.65% among women. These figures reflect ongoing challenges in access to education, particularly for girls and women in rural areas.

=== Languages ===
Pashto is the predominant language in the sub-tehsil, spoken by approximately 78,554 individual (~99.55% of the population). A small portion of the population speaks other local languages.

== See also ==
- Districts of Pakistan
  - Districts of Balochistan, Pakistan
- Tehsils of Pakistan
  - Tehsils of Balochistan
- Divisions of Pakistan
  - Divisions of Balochistan
