= Dera Bugti Tehsil, Balochistan =

District in Balochistan, Pakistan

Upper Deta Bugti District ضلع اپر ڈیرہ بگٹی
- District of Balochistan
- Map of Balochistan Districts with Dera Bugti District highlighted
- Country: Pakistan
- Province: Balochistan
- Division: Koh e Sulaiman
- Established: 26 Feb 2026
- Headquarters: Baiker

Government
  - Type: District Administration
  - Deputy Commissioner: N/A

Area
  - Total: 7,610 km^{2} (2,940 sq mi)

Population (2023 Census of Pakistan)
  - Total: 260,220
  - Density: 34.2/km^{2} (89/sq mi)

Literacy
  - Literacy rate: Total: (28.53%); Male: (32.65%); Female: (23.93%)
- Time zone: UTC+5 (PST)

Upper Dera Bugti District (Balochi: ضلع اپر ڈیرہ بگٹی; Urdu: ضلع بالائی ڈیرہ بگٹی) is a newly created administrative district in the eastern region of the Balochistan province of Pakistan. It was established on 26 February 2026 by the Government of Balochistan, which bifurcated the original Dera Bugti District into two separate units: Dera Bugti and Upper Dera Bugti.

== History and Formation ==
For decades, the region was managed as a single administrative unit known as Dera Bugti, which was originally a tribal area until it gained district status in 1983. In early 2026, the provincial government introduced significant administrative reforms aimed at improving service delivery and governance in the Sulaiman Range. As part of these reforms, Dera Bugti was divided, and the new Upper Dera Bugti District was incorporated into the newly formed Koh-e-Sulaiman Division.

== Geography and Administration ==
The district is situated in the hilly, northern part of the former Dera Bugti area, characterized by the rugged terrain of the Sulaiman Mountains. Unlike the lower plains of Sui, this northern section is known for milder summers due to its higher altitude.

- Headquarters: The administrative headquarters of the district is located at Bekhar (also spelled Baiker).
- Division: It is part of the Koh-e-Sulaiman Division, along with Barkhan and Kohlu districts.
- Tehsils: The district primarily comprises the northern sub-divisions of the former district, including the Qadirabad (Phelawagh), Chief Ali Muhammad, Nabi Dad and Sar Loop tehsils.

== Demographics and Economy ==
The district is predominantly inhabited by the Bugti tribe. The economy is largely based on livestock rearing and agriculture, though the broader region is world-renowned for its vast natural gas reserves, including the Pir Koh gas field located in the mountainous areas.
