= Solband =

Destroyed village in Pakistan

Solband سولبند
- Village
- Location within Balochistan, Pakistan Location within Pakistan
- Country: Pakistan
- Province: Balochistan
- Division: Makran
- District: Kech District
- Tehsil: Solband Tehsil
- Elevation: 129 m (423 ft)
- Time zone: UTC+5 (PST)
- Number of Union councils: 1

Solband was a village in Balochistan, Pakistan; it was destroyed in the 2007 South Asian floods.

== See also ==
- Tehsils in Pakistan
  - Tehsils of Balochistan
- Districts of Pakistan
  - Districts of Balochistan, Pakistan
- Divisions of Pakistan
  - Divisions of Balochistan
