= Harnai District =

District in Balochistan, Pakistan

Harnai District ضلع ہرنائی هرناۍ ولسوالۍ
- District of Balochistan
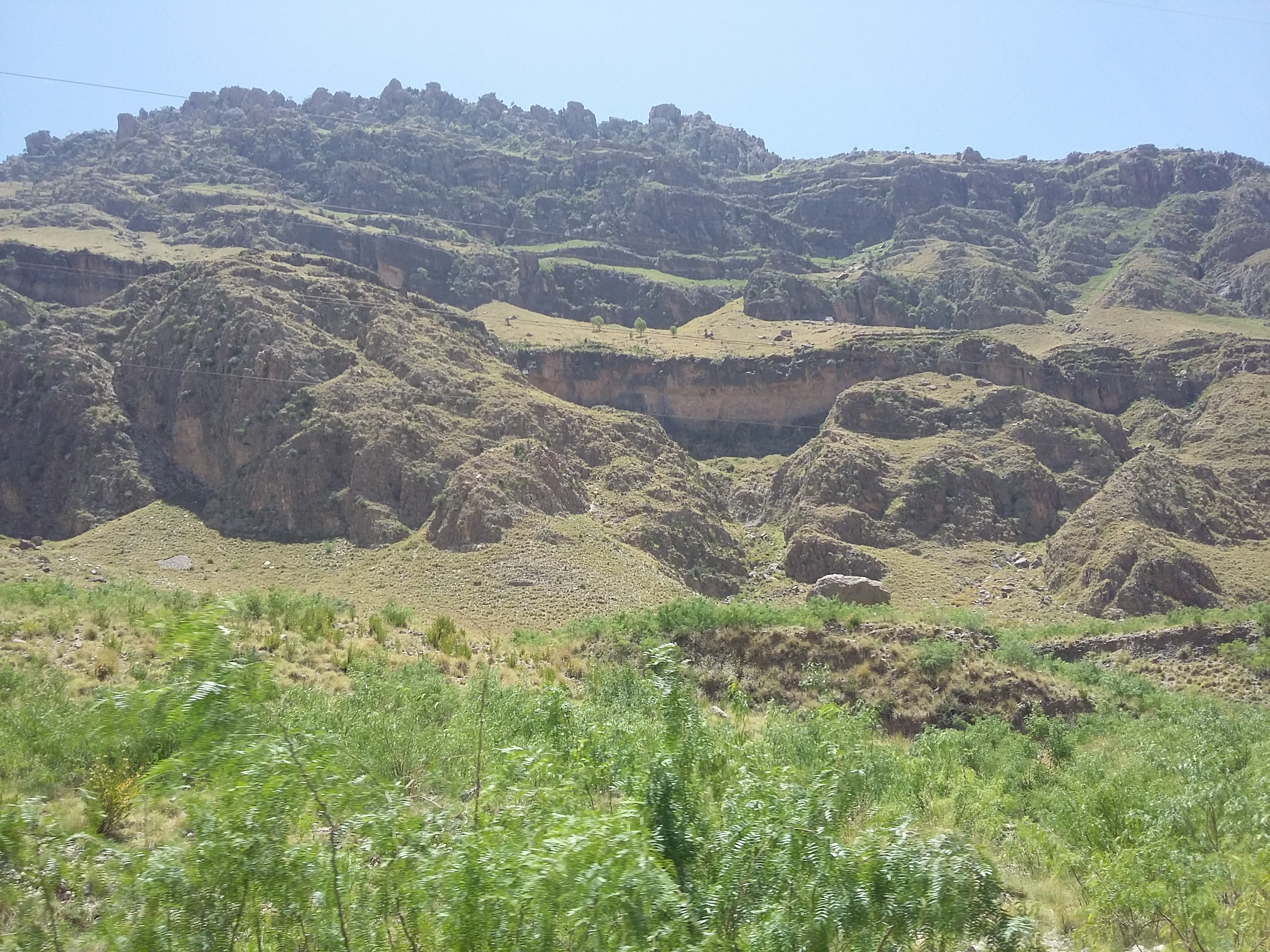
- Mountains in Harnai

- Map of Balochistan with Harnai District highlighted
- Coordinates: 30.105447°N 67.939861°E
- Country: Pakistan
- Province: Balochistan
- Division: Sibi
- Headquarters: Harnai

Government
  - Type: District Administration
  - Deputy Commissioner: N/A
  - District Police Officer: N/A
  - District Health Officer: N/A

Area
  - District of Balochistan: 2,492 km^{2} (962 sq mi)

Population (2023)
  - District of Balochistan: 127,571
  - Density: 51.19/km^{2} (132.6/sq mi)
  - Urban: 33,433 (26.21%)
  - Rural: 94,138 (73.79%)

Literacy
  - Literacy rate: Total: (39.83%); Male: (48.91%); Female: (29.71%)
- Time zone: UTC+5 (PST)

Harnai (Urdu: ضلع ہرنائی) is a district in the northeastern part of the Balochistan province of Pakistan. Harnai is the principal town of this district and serves as its administrative headquarters.

Until 2007, Harnai had been a tehsil of Sibi District. In August that year, the Balochistan Government announced the Harnai district would be created by splitting the Sibi district and forming the new district from Harnai and Shahrag tehsils and the sub-tehsil of Khost.

== History ==
The name Harnai refers to an influential Hindu personality, Harnam Das, supposed founder of Harnai town, the capital of Harnai District. The town is quite close to Loralai, Ziarat, Sibi, and Quetta. Harnai is surrounded by imposing hills on all sides. The encircling hill ranges have the resounding names of 'Khalifat' and 'Zarghun'.

Harnai proper has a population of about 200,000. The majority of the population of Harnai are Tarins and they mostly speak a unique dialect, or language, Tarino (Wanetsi), which is quite different from the Pashto spoken in other parts of Balochistan and Khyber Pakhtunkhwa provinces, and is probably a mixture of Pashto, Urdu and other languages developed as a 'lingua franca' sometime during the 18th and 19th centuries, when a variety of people of different ethnic origins lived here. There seems to be no earlier historical record or trace of it.

== Geography and climate ==
Harnai is surrounded by mountainous ranges. The minimum and maximum winter temperature of the area is −2˚C to 20˚C. The summer is extreme in the area and the minimum and maximum temperatures range from 20˚C to 48˚C. Harnai has a fertile rainy season during monsoon time. In general, Harnai has pleasant weather in the winter season.

== Administration ==
Tehsil	Area (km²)	Pop. (2023)	Density (ppl/km²) (2023)	Literacy rate (2023)	Union Councils
Harnai Tehsil	259	82,001	316.61	36.28%	...
Shahrigh Tehsil	614	29,005	47.24	50.12%	...
Khoast Tehsil	1,619	16,565	10.23	40.35%	...

== Demographics ==
Historical population
Year	Pop.	±% p.a.
1951	N/A	—
1961	N/A	—
1972	N/A	—
1981	N/A	—
1998	76,652	—
2017	97,052	+1.25%
2023	127,571	+4.66%

=== Population ===
As of the 2023 census, Harnai district has 16,393 households and a population of 127,571. The district has a sex ratio of 111.89 males to 100 females and a literacy rate of 39.83%: 48.91% for males and 29.71% for females. 54,999 (43.11% of the surveyed population) are under 10 years of age. 33,433 (26.21%) live in urban areas.

=== Religion ===
Religions in present-day Harnai district
Religion	2017		2023	
Religion	Pop.	%	Pop.	%
Islam	96,441	99.37%	126,465	99.13%
Hinduism	300	0.31%	421	0.33%
Christianity	275	0.28%	589	0.46%
Others	36	0.04%	96	0.08%
Total Population	97,052	100%	127,571	100%

Islam is the largest religion with 99.13% of the population. Christianity is the second largest religion.

=== Language ===
Languages of Harnai district (2023)
1. Pashto (89.2%)
2. Balochi (8.20%)
3. Sindhi (0.70%)
4. Others (1.86%)

At the time of the 2023 census, 89.24% of the population spoke Pashto, 8.20% Balochi and 0.7% Sindhi as their first language.

== See also ==
- Districts of Pakistan
  - Districts of Khyber Pakhtunkhwa, Pakistan
  - Districts of Punjab, Pakistan
  - Districts of Balochistan, Pakistan
  - Districts of Sindh, Pakistan
  - Districts of Azad Kashmir
  - Districts of Gilgit-Baltistan
- Divisions of Pakistan
  - Divisions of Balochistan
  - Divisions of Khyber Pakhtunkhwa
  - Divisions of Punjab
  - Divisions of Sindh
  - Divisions of Azad Kashmir
  - Divisions of Gilgit-Baltistan

== Bibliography ==
- 1998 District census report of Sibi. Census publication. Vol. 17. Islamabad: Population Census Organization, Statistics Division, Government of Pakistan. 1999.
