= Gwadar Tehsil =

Tehsil of Balochistan, Pakistan

- Tehsil
- Country: Pakistan
- Region: (Balochistan, Pakistan) Balochistan
- District: Gwadar
- Capital: Gwadar
- Union councils: ...

Government
  - Type: Tehsil Municipal Administration
  - Administrator: ...
  - Municipal Officer: ...

Area
  - Tehsil: 2,590 km^{2} (1,000 sq mi)

Population (2023)
  - Tehsil: 147,673
  - Density: 57.0/km^{2} (148/sq mi)
  - Urban: 70,852 (47.96%)
  - Rural: 76,821 (52.04%)

Literacy
  - Literacy rate: Total: (51.60%); Male: (58.69%); Female: (43.61%)
- Time zone: UTC+5 (PST)
  - Summer (DST): UTC+6 (PDT)

Gwadar Tehsil (Urdu: تحصیل گوادر; Balochi: تحصیل گوادر) is an administrative subdivision located in the Gwadar District of Balochistan, Pakistan. It is situated on the southwestern coast of Pakistan along the Arabian Sea.

== Geography ==
Gwadar Tehsil is located on the southwestern coast of Pakistan, in the Balochistan province. It is bordered by the Arabian Sea to the south.

== Demographics ==
=== Population ===
Historical population
Year	Pop.	±% p.a.
1951	...	—
1961	14,304	—
1972	27,473	+6.11%
1981	33,404	+2.20%
1998	72,614	+4.67%
2017	137,695	+3.43%
2023	147,673	+1.17%

According to the 2023 census, Gwadar Tehsil had a population of 147,673 people. The majority of the population was Baloch. The literacy rate is 51.60% overall, with 58.69% for males and 43.61% for females.

== See also ==
- Gwadar District
- China-Pakistan Economic Corridor (CPEC)
- Balochistan
- Gwadar Port
- Tehsils of Pakistan
  - Tehsils of Punjab, Pakistan
  - Tehsils of Balochistan
  - Tehsils of Khyber Pakhtunkhwa
  - Tehsils of Sindh
  - Tehsils of Azad Kashmir
  - Tehsils of Gilgit-Baltistan
