= Khattan =

Khattan ختن
- Country: Pakistan
- Province: Balochistan
- District: Kachhi District
- Time zone: UTC+5 (PST)

Khattan (Urdu: ختن) is a sub-tehsil located in Kachhi District in the Balochistan province of Pakistan.
