= Saranan Tehsil =

Subdivision of Balochistan, Pakistan

- Tehsil
- Location within Balochistan, Pakistan
- Coordinates: 30.545414°N 66.971092°E
- Country: Pakistan
- Province: Balochistan
- Division: Quetta
- District: Pishin

Population (2023)
  - Total: 65,157
- Time zone: UTC+5 (PST)

Saranan is a tehsil of Pishin District in the Balochistan province of Pakistan.

== Demographics ==
=== Population ===
Historical population
Year	Pop.	±% p.a.
1951	...	—
1961	...	—
1972	...	—
1981	...	—
1998	28,867	—
2017	56,302	+3.58%
2023	65,157	+2.46%

As of the 2023 census, Saranan has population of 46,512.

=== Languages ===
More than 93% of the population speak the Pashto language as their mother tongue. Another 7% are speaking the Brahui language.
