= Huramzai =

- Location within Balochistan, Pakistan Location within Pakistan
- Coordinates: 30.43°N 66.50°E
- Country: Pakistan

Government
- Elevation: 1,471 m (4,826 ft)

Population (2023)
  - Total: 42,945
- Time zone: UTC+5 (PST)

Huramzai is a town located in the Pishin District of Balochistan province, Pakistan. It is located at 30°43'32N 66°50'24E at an elevation of 1,471 meters (4,826 ft).

It is the largest populated region in the Pishin District. Agriculture being the most predominant occupation for the residents, the town has a reputation for its orchards and vineyards. The town is also location of the regional bazaar with many local merchants. Huramzai has residential and commercial electrical service, gas stations as well as telephone and mobile phone services.

== Demographics ==
=== Population ===
Historical population
Year	Pop.	±% p.a.
1951	...	—
1961	...	—
1972	...	—
1981	...	—
1998	...	—
2017	29,402	—
2023	42,945	+6.52%

As of the 2023 census, Huramzai has population of 29,380.

Approximately 95% of the population are from the "Syed" tribe, they are from Imam Zain Ul Abdin family. several members of the tribe being employed by the local government.

== Sports ==
Football is very popular in Hurramzai with Sarbaz Club Hurramzai being one of the local favorites. Cricket is also quite popular among the locals, with tournaments being held each year. Dawn cricket team the Champion of the region.

== Politics ==
Huramzai is very much active in politics and its major parties are:

- Pakistan Tehreek-e-Insaf (PTI).
- Jamiat Ulama-e-Islam (JUI-F).
- Jamiat-e-Ulema Islam (Ideological section)
- Awami National Party (ANP).
- Pakhtoon Khwa Mili Awami party (PKMAP).
- Pakistan Peoples party (PPP).

== Population ==
According to Census of 2017-3-15 (132,168)

== Hajizai Syedan ==
Killi Hajizai is a village of Tehsil Huramzai and part of Union Council Gangalzai, sitting near Huramzai (west), Hajan Shakarzai in the east and Ganglalzai in the south. The whole village is inhabited by the Syed family. Hajizai is surrounded by grain and vegetable fields as well as fruit orchards. There are middle schools, both for boys and girls. In 1985 the girls school of Hajizai was ranked among the top 5 middle schools in the Pishin district. There is also a Madrassa (religious school) and a medical clinic serving to facilitate the masses.

The former president of Afghanistan, Noor Mohammad Tarakai had great affiliation with Hajizai and lived and spent his childhood in the village; his sister named Tarake Anna was married to the Malak of Hajizai named Agha Lala (Syed Abdul Sattar Agha).

The area also features a mountainous picnic resort with a small dam (filled with water in spring season). The location is a popular destination with the locals and sees increasing tourism peaking in the months of March and April.
