= Musakhel Bazar =

Musakhel موسیٰ خیل
- Town
- Musakhel Bazar
- Location within Balochistan, Pakistan Location within Pakistan
- Coordinates: 30.52°N 69.49°E
- Country: Pakistan
- Province: Balochistan
- District: Musakhel

Government
  - Type: Municipal Council
  - Chairman: Vacant
  - Vice-Chairman: Vacant
- Elevation: 1,341 m (4,400 ft)

Population
  - Town: 15,805
- Time zone: UTC+5 (PST)

Musakhel (Urdu: موسیٰ خیل), also known as Musakhel bazar, is a city and administrative headquarter of Musakhel District in the Balochistan province of Pakistan. It is located at 30°52'0N 69°49'0E at an altitude of 1,341 metres (4402 feet).

During the period of British rule the town was the capital of Musakhel Tehsil, then a subdivision of Loralai District.

== Demographics ==
As of the 2023 census, Musakhel Bazar had a population of 15,805.

Historical population
Year	Pop.	±% p.a.
1972	917	—
1998	11,589	+10.25%
2017	14,135	+1.05%
2023	15,805	+1.88%
