= Chagai, Pakistan =

City in Balochistan, Pakistan

Coordinates: 29°18′0″N 64°42′0″E

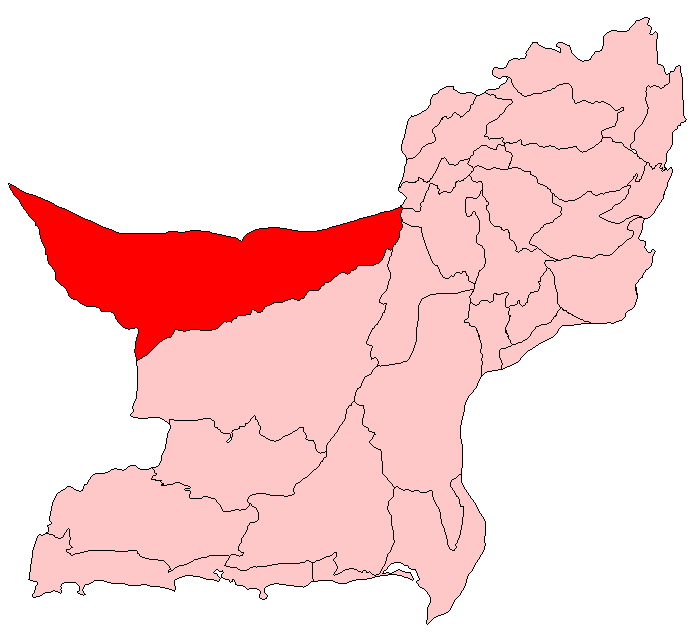
a map of Balochistan, with Chagai District in bright red

Chagai (Urdu: چاغى) is a city of Chagai District in the Balochistan province of Pakistan. It is located at 29°18'0N 64°42'0E and has an elevation of 850 m (2791 ft). Chagai got its popularity due to the nuclear program of Pakistan, which was executed in the district in 1998.
