= Barkhan Tehsil =

- Tehsil
- Country: Pakistan
- Province: Balochistan
- District: Barkhan
- Capital: Barkhan

Area
  - Tehsil: 3,514 km^{2} (1,357 sq mi)

Population (2023)
  - Tehsil: 210,249
  - Urban: 14,425 (6.86%)
  - Rural: 195,824 (93.14%)

Literacy (2023)
  - Literacy rate: Total: (33.62%); Male: (41.63%); Female: (24.93%)
- Time zone: UTC+5 (PST)
- Number of Union Councils: 8

Barkhan is an administrative subdivision, (tehsil) of Barkhan District in the Balochistan province of Pakistan. It is administratively subdivided into 8 Union Councils, namely Bagahao, Barkhan, ChoharKot, Eshani, Naharkot, Rakhni, Rarkan and Saddar Barkhan.

== Demographics ==
=== Population ===
As of the 2023 census, Barkhan Tehsil has a population of 210,249.

Historical population
Year	Pop.	±% p.a.
1951	...	—
1961	29,756	—
1972	44,704	+3.77%
1981	61,686	+3.64%
1998	103,545	+3.09%
2017	171,025	+2.68%
2023	210,249	+3.50%
