= Hoshab Tehsil =

Hoshab Tehsil is an administrative subdivision (tehsil) located in the Kech District (also known as Turbat) of the Makuran Division of Balochistan province of Pakistan.
