= Harnai =

Town in Balochistan, Pakistan

Harnai: هرنای; ہرنائی
- District Capital
- Zawara (interior of the earth)
- Location within Balochistan, Pakistan Location within Pakistan
- Coordinates: 30°6′0″N 67°56′16″E
- Country: Pakistan
- Province: Balochistan
- District: Harnai District
- Elevation: 900 m (3,000 ft)

Population (2023)
  - Total: 14,277
- Time zone: UTC+5 (PST)

Harnai (Pashto: هرنای, Urdu: ہرنائی) town serves as the administrative headquarters of Harnai District in the Balochistan province of Pakistan. Until 2007, the town was in Sibi District.

It is located in the northeast of Balochistan province. The town is surrounded by the cities Ziarat, Loralai and the provincial capital, Quetta. The population is predominantly Pashtun followed by Baloch. The language spoken in the town is Tareeno, a unique and archaic dialect of Pashto.

The town is inhabited by majority of Pakhtun tribes like Tareen, Mushwani and Kakar and minority of Marri and Baloch.

== History ==
The old name of Harnai was Zawara, meaning "interior of the Earth" in Local Tareeno Language. Some people still pronounced Harnai as Zawara. The name Harnai refers to an influential Hindu personality, Harnam Das, supposed founder of Harnai town, the capital of Harnai District. The town is quite close to Loralai, Ziarat, Sibi, Mastung and Quetta. Harnai is surrounded by imposing hills on all sides. The encircling hill ranges have the resounding names of 'Khalifat' and 'Zarghun'. Loe sar Nekan (Zarghoon Gar) with an elevation of 3578 Meters is the highest mountain peak in the province of Baluchistan in the southwest of Pakistan is also situated in District Harnai. Harnai proper has a population of about 100,000. The majority of the population of Harnai are Tareens and they mostly speak Tareeno a unique dialect of Pashto, which is considered by some linguists to be distinctive enough to be classified as its own language. According to linguist Prods Oktor Skjaervo: "The Pashto area split into two dialect groups at a pre-literary period, represented today on the one hand by all the dialects of modern Pashto and on the other by Tareeno and by archaic remains in other southeast dialects."

Until 2007, Harnai had been a tehsil of Sibi District, in August 2007 the Balochistan Government announced that the Harnai district would be created by splitting the Sibi district and forming the new district from Harnai and Shahrag as a tehsil and the sub-tehsil of Khost.

== Geography ==
Harnai is surrounded by mountainous ranges, such as Koh e Zarghoon and Koh e Khalifat.

=== Climate ===
The minimum and maximum winter temperature of the area is -2˚C to 20˚C. The summer is extreme in the area and the minimum and maximum temperature fall between 20˚C to 48˚C. Harnai has a fertile rainy season during monsoon time. In general, Harnai has pleasant weather in winter season. The best months to visit Harnai is February to April.

== Demographics ==
=== Population ===
Historical population
Year	Pop.	±% p.a.
1951	...	—
1961	1,940	—
1972	2,503	+2.34%
1981	4,802	+7.51%
1998	9,359	+4.00%
2017	13,303	+1.87%
2023	14,277	+1.18%

As of the 2023 census, Harnai had a population of 14,277.
