= Luni, Balochistan =

Luni, (Pashto: Loni-لونی), pronounced "Looni", or "Luni" is a village in the Balochistan province of Pakistan. It is located about 11 kilometres (6.8 mi) north of the city of Sibi in Sibi District of Balochistan Province, at an altitude of 495 feet (151 m). Luni area extends from Nari Gorge to Bori Wah. This village is inhabited by the Loni tribe of Miana (Pashtun tribe). Population of town in 2011 was 1875 in 302 households. Lunis are well known for their education and they're among the most educated tribe of sibi division.

Luni elders used to relate the story that their great-grandfather Asad Khan Luni (from him Sadozai sardarkhels) had quarrelled with some of his kinsmen (Loni (Pashtun tribe)) at Muqur, Ghazni. The specific cause for quarrel is not known. Being unable to assert his claim he, probably about 1663 A.D.; moved south along with the four subsections of his tribe. On reaching SIWI they encamped in front of the Siwi-fort, some period later either a Mizri or a Barozai Panni chief granted Daud Khan Luni present Luni area and a share of water (4 pao). The above named four sub-sections still exist in Luni village and are Badozai, Naakezai, Sakhizai and Srawar( or Sulemanzai).

Luni tribe owns 4 pao of water from Nari river, initially Sadozai's were sole owners of whole Luni, Balochistan and its water shares, but later on Sahib Khan Sadozai sold his 1/4th share (subsequently bought by other Luni subtribes in 1882), remaining 3/4 owned by Azizkhels. During British period the only remainder of Sadozai branch consisted of one ‘Sardar Aziz Khan Luni’ and from him sprang the Azizkhels. Sardar Aziz khan (died 1911) had 5 sons, Khan Sahib Ahmad Khan, Muhammad khan, Dawood Khan, Hassan Khan & Misri Khan. Azizkhels also own 1 pao water & land in mouza Safi Abdul Wahab and in Khajjak.

The tribe and the village is currently led by Abdulaziz Khan Luni, a senior retired bureaucrat and author of ‘Afghans of the Passes’ and ‘British Balochistan’

List of successive chiefs is following: Asad Khan (led Lunis to Sibi from Ghazni), Misri Khan, Mittha khan, Dawood Khan 1st (was granted present Luni area and 4 pao water share), Umar Khan, Hassan Khan, Dawood Khan 2nd, Ahmad Khan, Moladad Khan (during his period Lunis quarreled with Khajjaks and went to exile in Kurak village), Sardar Aziz Khan(1st) during his reign present Luni village was built, KS Ahmad Khan (member British district Jirga Sibi, was titled Khan Sahib by the British), Saidal Khan, Abdul Aziz Khan (current head)

In a judicial document of Lunis dated 1906, the following is stated : “In the battle against Zarkuns led by Sardar Bakhtiar Khan Barozai we had 13 Lunis killed. Second - when Azim Khan Barozai led a battle at Sangan we had five Lunis killed & twelve wounded. Third - in the battle at Sheikh-Katta we had ten Lunis killed. Fourth - we had three Lunis killed at the battle of Wabay. Fifth - one Luni killed and several wounded at the battle of Nari-Gorge. Sixth - when Khan Kalat Khudadad Khan attacked Marris ten mounted Lunis accompanied Bakhtiar Khan Barozai. Seventh - during the tenure of Hitu Ram Extra Assistant Comnissioner Sibi when Marris attacked Mal-village of Guhramzais Lunis provided 15 fighting men to the forces led by Baruzai Sardars. Eight - when Mr. Duke attacked Marris we contributed 7 fighting men to the forces led by Baruzais. Ninth - when Pannis led by Baruzais went to Spintangi in search of culprits ten Lunis accompanied Sarbuland Khan Baruzai".
