= Phelawagh =

- Town and union council
- Qadirabad
- Country: Pakistan
- Region: Balochistan
- District: Upper Dera Bugti District
- Time zone: UTC+5 (PST)

Phelawagh or Qadirabad is a town and tehsil of Dera Bugti District in the Balochistan province of Pakistan. The town of Phelawagh also functions as a union council (a local government body).

In the 2026 Administration changes of Balochistan Province Phelawagh Sub Division or tehsil renamed to Qadirabad and the Baiker the headquarters of tehsil is also the headquarters of newly established district Upper Dera Bugti District.
