= Kohlu District =

District in Balochistan, Pakistan

Coordinates: 29.8997°N 69.2507°E

Kohlu District ضلع کوہلو کۏهلو دمگ
- District of Balochistan
- Map of Balochistan Districts with Kohlu District highlighted
- Country: Pakistan
- Province: Balochistan
- Division: Koh e Sulaiman
- Established: 1974
- Headquarters: Kohlu

Government
  - Type: District Administration
  - Deputy Commissioner: N/A
  - District Chairman: Mir Nisar Ahmed Marri (PTI)
  - District Vice Chairman: Ghazi Khan Loharani (PTI)

Area
  - Total: 7,610 km^{2} (2,940 sq mi)

Population (2023 Census of Pakistan)
  - Total: 260,220
  - Density: 34.2/km^{2} (89/sq mi)

Literacy
  - Literacy rate: Total: (28.53%); Male: (32.65%); Female: (23.93%)
- Time zone: UTC+5 (PST)
- Number of Tehsils: 3

Kohlu district (Balochi: کوہلو, Urdu: ضلع کوہلو) is a district of the Balochistan province of Pakistan. It is bounded in the north by Loralai District, with Dera Bugti in the south, Barkhan in the east, and Sibi District in the west.

== Administration ==
Tehsil	Area (km²)	Pop. (2023)	Density (ppl/km²) (2023)	Literacy rate (2023)	Union Councils
Kahan Tehsil	3,754	107,840	28.73	19.87%	...
Kohlu Tehsil	231	48,050	208.01	49.76%	...
Maiwand Tehsil	2,915	51,635	17.71	25.75%	...
Tamboo Tehsil	536	37,449	69.87	29.32%	...
Shaheed Jahangir Abad	...	...	...	...	...
Grisani Tehsil	174	15,246	87.62	34.40%	...

== Demographics ==
Historical population
Year	Pop.	±% p.a.
1951	...	—
1961	28,101	—
1972	55,497	+6.38%
1981	71,269	+2.82%
1998	99,846	+2.00%
2017	213,933	+4.09%
2023	260,220	+3.32%

=== Population ===
As of the 2023 census, Kohlu district has 38,095 households and a population of 260,220. The district has a sex ratio of 109.91 males to 100 females and a literacy rate of 28.53%: 32.65% for males and 23.93% for females. 96,678 (37.15% of the surveyed population) are under 10 years of age. 18,978 (7.29%) live in urban areas.

=== Religion ===
Religions in present-day Kohlu district
Religion	2017		2023	
Religion	Pop.	%	Pop.	%
Islam	213,644	99.86%	259,213	99.61%
Christianity	223	0.10%	921	0.35%
Others	66	0.03%	86	0.04%
Total Population	213,933	100%	260,220	100%

=== Language ===
Languages of Kohlu district (2023)
1. Balochi (95.6%)
2. Pashto (3.97%)
3. Others (0.42%)

At the time of the 2023 census, 95.61% of the population spoke Balochi and 3.97% Pashto as their first language.

== Education ==
According to the Pakistan District Education Rankings 2017, district Kohlu is ranked at number 116 out of the 141 ranked districts in Pakistan on the education score index. This index considers learning, gender parity and retention in the district.

Literacy rate in 2014–15 of population 10 years and older in the district stands at 32%, whereas for females it is only 12%.

Post primary access is a major issue in the district with 91% of schools being at primary level. Compare this with high schools, which constitute only 4% of government schools in the district. This is also reflected in the enrollment figures for 2015–17 with 2,754 students enrolled in class 1 to 5 and only 8 students enrolled in class 9 and 10.

Gender disparity is another issue in the district. Only 20% schools in the district are girls’ schools. Access to education for girls is a major issue in the district and is also reflected in the low literacy rates for females.

Moreover, the schools in the district lack basic facilities. According to Alif Ailaan district education rankings 2017, the district is ranked at number 150 out of the 155 districts of Pakistan for primary school infrastructure. At the middle school level, it is ranked at number 149 out of the 155 districts. These rankings take into account the basic facilities available in schools including drinking water, working toilet, availability of electricity, existence of a boundary wall and general building condition. More than 4 out of 5 schools do not have electricity. 9 out 10 schools lack a toilet and 3 out of 4 schools do not have a boundary wall. 1 out of 2 schools do not have clean drinking water.

== Bibliography ==
- 1998 District census report of Kohlu. Census publication. Vol. 22. Islamabad: Population Census Organization, Statistics Division, Government of Pakistan. 1999.
