= Ziarat =

Town in Balochistan, Pakistan

Ziarat زیارت
- Town
- Location within Balochistan, Pakistan Location within Pakistan
- Coordinates: 30°22′56″N 67°43′32″E
- Country: Pakistan
- Province: (Balochistan, Pakistan) Balochistan
- District: Ziarat
- Elevation: 2,543 m (8,343 ft)

Population (2023)
  - Total: 3,863
- Time zone: UTC+5 (PST)
- Calling code: 0833

Ziarat (Urdu/ Balochi/ Dari/ Pashto: زیارت) is a city in the Ziarat District of the Balochistan province in Pakistan. It lies 130 kilometres (81 mi) away from Quetta, the provincial capital of Balochistan. Previously, it was part of Sibi district. It was announced as a separate district on 1 July 1986. The Quaid-e-Azam Residency is located in this valley, where Quaid-e-Azam (the founder of Pakistan) spent some of his last days.

== History ==
On 29 October 2008, at around 4 am, Ziarat and surrounding areas were struck by an earthquake doublet. The first tremor, 6.2 magnitude, lasted a couple of seconds, and was followed by a magnitude-6.4 tremor that lasted almost 30 seconds, destroying many mud houses and several government buildings. Neighbouring villages were also badly affected by the earthquake. More than 200 people were killed, and over 50,000 were left homeless. Landslides cut off many roads, making the area less accessible to emergency responders. Pakistani military helicopters were used to reach mountainous and remote locations.

== Geography ==
Ziarat is surrounded by the lush green Ziarat Juniper Forest, known locally as Sanober, home to the largest area of Juniper forest (Juniperus seravschanica) in Pakistan, covering about 110,000 hectares. The juniper trees of Ziarat are one of the oldest trees of their kind with some of these trees being 4000 years old. It is believed that the forest is the second largest of its kind in the world.

=== Climate ===
Ziarat has a continental climate (Koppen: Dsa) and remains quite cool in summer compared to other cities in Pakistan.

== Demographics ==
=== Population ===
Historical population
| Year | Pop. | ±% p.a. |
|---|---|---|
| 1951 | ... | — |
| 1961 | ... | — |
| 1972 | 533 | — |
| 1981 | 201 | −10.27% |
| 1998 | 636 | +7.01% |
| 2017 | 3,392 | +9.21% |
| 2023 | 3,863 | +2.19% |
