= Ziarat District =

District in Balochistan, Pakistan

Coordinates: 30°25′N 67°30′E

Ziarat District ضلع زیارت ضلع زیارت د زیارت ولسوالۍ ولسوالی زیارت
- District
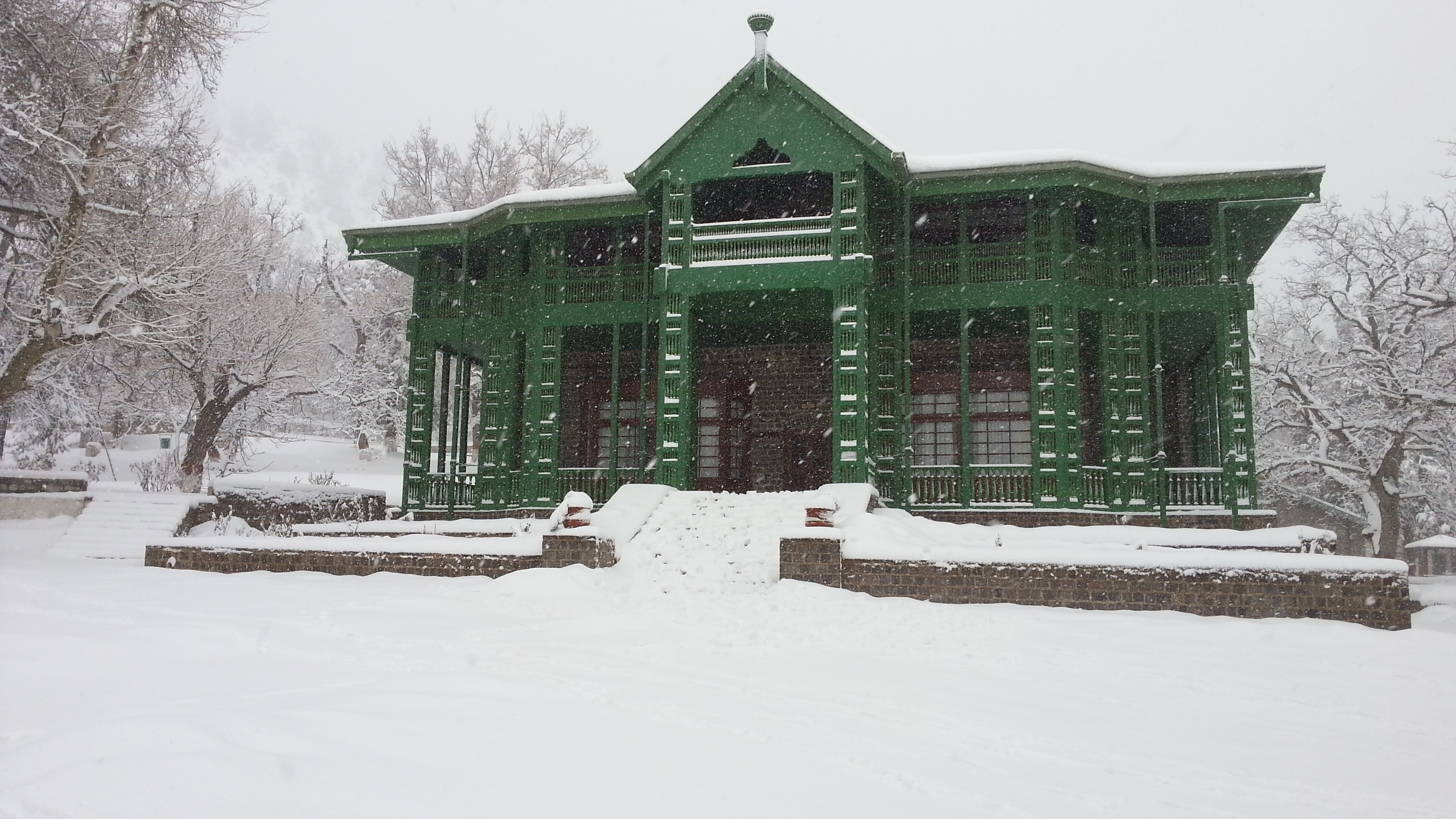
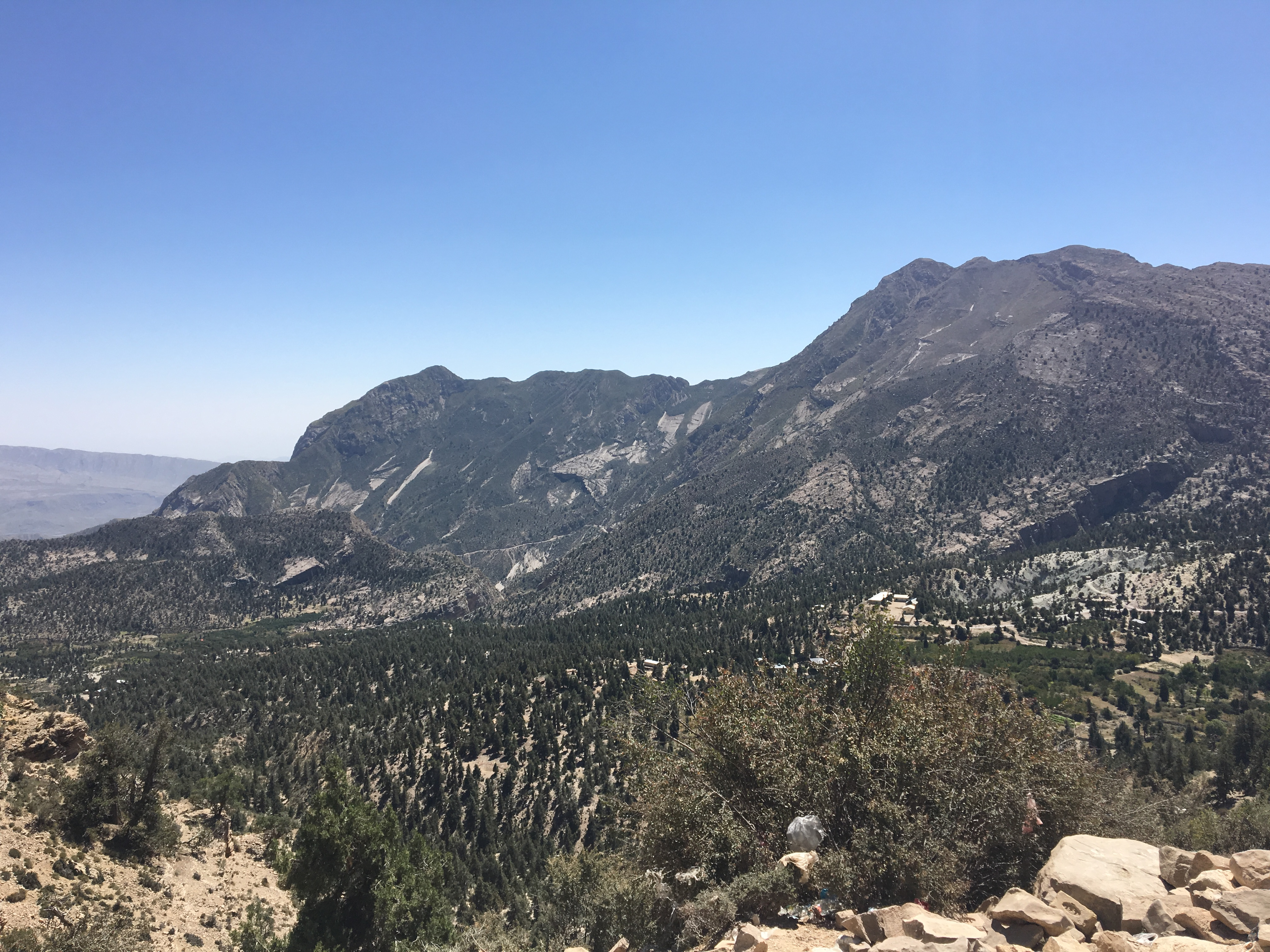
- Top: Quaid-e-Azam Residency in Ziarat; Bottom: Ziarat valley

- Map of Balochistan with Ziarat District highlighted
- Country: Pakistan
- Province: Balochistan
- Division: Sibi
- Established: July 1986
- Headquarters: Ziarat

Government
  - Type: District Administration
  - Deputy Commissioner: N/A
  - District Police Officer: N/A
  - District Health Officer: N/A

Area
  - District: 3,301 km^{2} (1,275 sq mi)

Population (2023)
  - District: 189,535
  - Density: 57.42/km^{2} (148.7/sq mi)
  - Urban: 49,402 (26.06%)
  - Rural: 140,133 (73.94%)

Literacy
  - Literacy rate: Total: (43.37%); Male: (53.06%); Female: (33.49%)
- Time zone: UTC+5 (PST)
- Number of Tehsils: 2
- Website: ziarat

Ziarat is a district in the north of Balochistan province of Pakistan. Ziarat town (situated at an altitude of about 2,400 meters) is the headquarters of the district, the sub-division, and also of the tehsil. The highest peak of Khalifat Hills, at an altitude of 3,500 metres (11,400 ft), is located in Ziarat district.

== Administration ==
Ziarat District was established in July 1986, previously being part of Sibi District. The district, with a population of 52,855, is subdivided into two tehsils, Ziarat and Sanjawi. The latter is comparatively more densely populated, with a population of 32,456, while Ziarat tehsil has a population of 18,000. The district contains a total of ten Union Councils.

Tehsil	Area (km²)	Pop. (2023)	Density (ppl/km²) (2023)	Literacy rate (2023)	Union Councils
Ziarat Tehsil	1,489	78,912	53.00	54.20%	...
Sinjawi Tehsil	1,812	110,623	61.05	35.88%	...

== Demographics ==
=== Population ===
Historical population
Year	Pop.	±% p.a.
1961	15,853	—
1972	37,688	+8.19%
1981	63,179	+5.91%
1998	80,748	+1.45%
2017	160,095	+3.67%
2023	189,535	+2.85%

As of the 2023 census, Ziarat district has 22,894 households and a population of 189,535. The district has a sex ratio of 103.02 males to 100 females and a literacy rate of 43.37%: 53.06% for males and 33.49% for females. 78,905 (41.63% of the surveyed population) are under 10 years of age. 49,402 (26.06%) live in urban areas.

== Tourism ==
Ziarat has some of the oldest Juniper forests in the world. A tourist destination, the economy of the district also benefits from orchards of apples and cherries. The Ziarat district has the highest Human Development Index of all districts in the province. The first Governor-General of Pakistan, Muhammad Ali Jinnah, spent last days of his life in Ziarat Residency in Ziarat.

== Notable people ==
- Arman Loni
- Wranga Loni

== Bibliography ==
- 1998 District census report of Ziarat. Census publication. Vol. 19. Islamabad: Population Census Organization, Statistics Division, Government of Pakistan. 1999.
