= Kohlu =

Kohlu کوہلو
- District Capital
- Location within Balochistan, Pakistan Location within Pakistan
- Coordinates: 29°53′48″N 69°15′12″E
- Country: Pakistan
- Province: Balochistan
- District: Kohlu District
- Elevation: 1,180 m (3,870 ft)

Population (2023)
  - Total: 18,978
- Time zone: UTC+5 (PST)

Kohlu (Urdu and Balochi: کوہلو) is the capital of Kohlu District in Pakistan's Balochistan province. In·May 1892 a sub-tahsil was established at Kohlu, the income being treated as a part of the Zhob Revenues. The sub-tahsil was abolished in 1895.

== Demographics ==
=== Population ===
Historical population
Year	Pop.	±% p.a.
1998	9,665	—
2017	17,443	+3.16%
2023	18,978	+1.42%

The population of city in 1998 was 9,665 but according to the 2023 Census of Pakistan, the population has risen to 18,978.

=== Languages ===
Languages of Kohlu mc (2023 Census)
1. Balochi (60.2%)
2. Pashto (37.8%)
3. Punjabi (1.00%)
4. Others (1.00%)
