= Allai District =

District of Khyber Pakhtunkhwa, Pakistan

- District
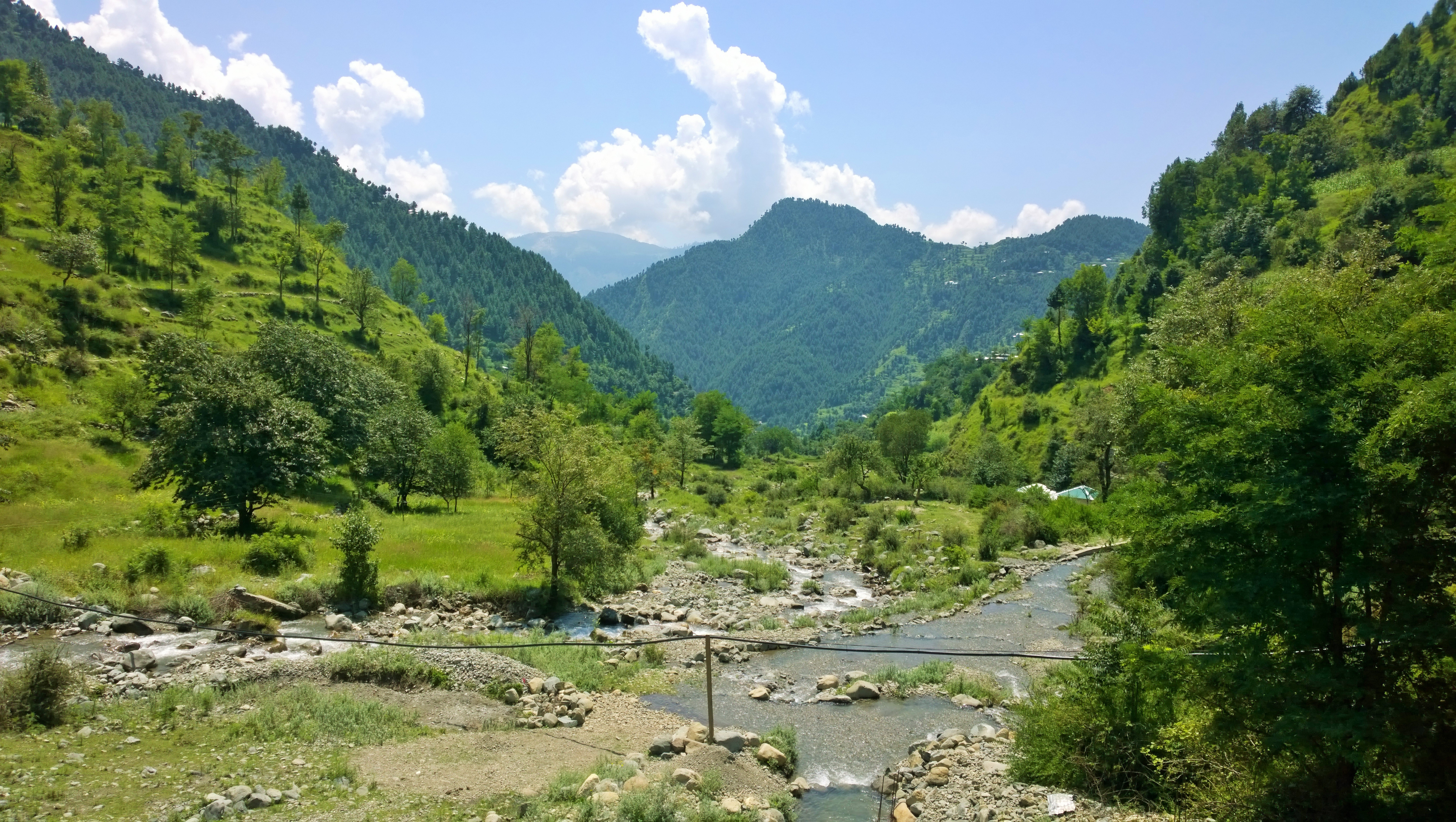
- Country: Pakistan
- Province: Khyber Pakhtunkhwa
- Division: Hazara Division
- Tehsils: 01
- Established: 23 January 2023
- Founder: Government of Khyber Pakhtunkhwa

Area
  - Total: 804 km^{2} (310 sq mi)

Population (2023 census)
  - Total: 218,149
  - Density: 271/km^{2} (703/sq mi)

Literacy
  - Literacy rate: Total: (35.71%); Male: (52.16%); Female: (18.43%)
- Time zone: UTC+5 (PKT)

Allai District is a district of Hazara Division in the Khyber Pakhtunkhwa province of Pakistan. The district was created on 22 January 2023 when the government announced its establishment after being separated from Battagram District.

== Formation ==
The Allai district covers an area of 521 sq km and has a population of 180,414 according to the 2017 census. It consists of eight union councils including Banna, Batila, Batkul, Biari, Jumbera, Pashto, Rushing and Shakargah. Allai was previously a tehsil within the Battagram District of the Hazara division.

== History ==
=== Allai tribal State (1595–1971) ===
Allai was historically a tribal state ruled by the Nawabs of Allai, also known as the independent chiefs of the Swati tribe. Unlike many documented chiefs whose positions were granted by the British, the Nawabs of Allai derived their authority from within the Swati tribe itself, being selected by the tribe rather than appointed by the British. The ruling family owns more than 500,000 kanals of land, making them among the largest landowners in Khyber Pakhtunkhwa.

Nawab Muhammad Ayub Khan was the last Nawab of Allai State until 1970. This state had its own currency. Arsala Khan Swati was the most powerful ruler among the Nawabs of Allai as he is famous for his great resistance against British rule. Arsala Khan was also the Chief of Independent Swatis who defended Yaghistan with the support of Panjghol Swatis, Panjmeral Swatis, Arghushal Swati Khans of Thakot and Khankhail Swatis of Hill and Banser. Nawabs of Allai belong to the Bebal subsection of Gabri Swatis. Pokal was the capital of state.

Arsala Khan was not ambitions to have more land or to torment British rule but wanted to creat a buffer State between Britisher and Allai Valley. Arsala Khan attacked Battle in Mansehra the zero point of Brititish rule and captured 200 Hindu as captio. The Hindu of Battle village near Chattar plain were made captives not for ransom but a challenge to Samandar Khan ( of Garihabibullah) the British Magistrate who expanding his boundary toward Battagram. Arsala Khan, the Chief of Swati Tribe halted the expansion by challenging the British rule at Battle, Mansehra. Arsala Khan was fined Rs.10,000 by the British governament. Arsala Khan Allai protected Muzafar Khan of Battagram from the Samandar Khan of Garihabibullah and defended Battagram territorial integrity against British rule. Muzafar Khan of Battagram was the main target of Samandar Khan who had ambitions of making Battagram to be the part of his Property. It is worth to mention that after the death of Arsala Khan Samandar Khan expanded his territorial limits to Nelishang. British governament sent troops to Pokal Allai for capturing Arsala Khan but he climbedup to Dumrai mountain. British torched a portion of Pokal village and then returned back to Mansehra without capturing Arsala Khan. The British left behind, telescope and begal ( an instrument for calling at military parade) at Pokal. Begal was sold by Nawaz khan Pokal and telescope is still with Hustam khan lalajee of Pokal.

Arsala Khan died in 1907 leaving behind son namely Ghazi Khan. He was buried at main Pokal graveyard under the poplar tree. His grave is having precious soapstone minarets with beautiful curving.

Nawabs of Allai tribal state
From	To	Nawab
1595	1623	Ahmed Ali Khan Swati (Founder of the state)
1623	1645	Khan Raja Khan Swati
1645	1664	Khan Muhammad Khan Swati
1664	1685	Khan Nabi Khan Swati
1685	1714	Khan Khawaja Muhammad Khan Swati
1714	1746	Khan Gul Muhammad Khan Swati
1746	1772	Khan Rustam Khan Swati
1772	1805	Khan Hakim Khan Swati
1805	1835	Khan Jamal Khan Swati
1835	1890	Khan Arsala Khan Swati
1890	1923	Nawab Ghazi Khan Swati
1923	1952	Nawab Roshan Khan Swati
1952	1989	Nawab Ayub Khan Swati
1989	2024	Akbar Namoos Khan Swati
2024		Prince Nawaz Khan Swati

=== Current chieftainship ===
However the status of state has been abolished. Akbar Namoos Khan, elder son of Nawab Ayub Khan Swati was the Chief of Allai Valley till 30 November, 2024, succeeded by his younger brother Prince Nawaz Khan Swati on 1 December, 2024.

== Administration ==
In 2022, Allai Tehsil was separated and upgraded to District status.

Tehsil	Urdu name	Pashto name	Area (km²)	Pop. (2023)	Density (ppl/km²) (2023)	Literacy rate (2023)	No. of Unions	Name of Unions
Allai Tehsil	تحصیل آلائی	الائي تحصیل	804	218,149	271.33	35.71%	8	Banna, Bateela, Batkul‚ Biari, Jambera, Pashto, Rashang and Sakargah

== Demographics ==
=== Population ===
Historical population
Year	Pop.	±% p.a.
1951	...	—
1961	21,963	—
1972	56,100	+8.90%
1981	134,955	+10.24%
1998	121,652	−0.61%
2017	180,502	+2.10%
2023	218,149	+3.21%

As of the 2023 census, Allai district had a population of 218,149.

=== Language ===
The main language spoken in the district is Pashto.
