= Divisions of Balochistan =

Second-level administrative regions of Pakistan

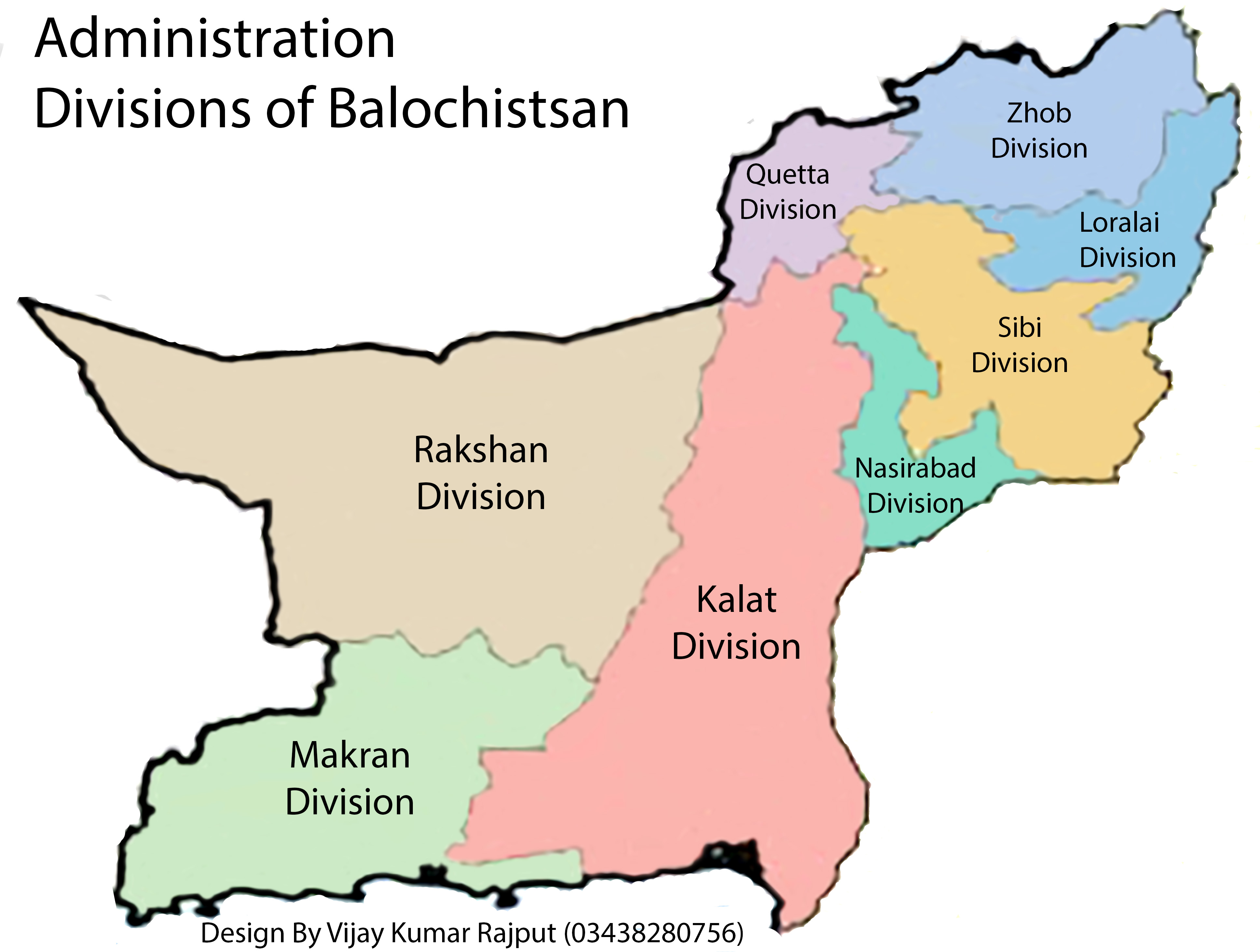
- Colors correspond to divisions of Balochistan
- Category: Second-level administrative subdivisions
- Location: Pakistan
- Found in: Balochistan
- Number: 11 (as of 2026)
- Populations: Greatest: Quetta — 2,908,763 (2023 census); Least: Rakhshan — 10,40,001 (2023 census)
- Areas: Largest: Rakhshan — 98,596 km^{2} (38,068 sq mi); Smallest: Quetta —9,434 km^{2} (3,642 sq mi)
- Government: Divisional Administration
- Subdivisions: Districts; Tehsils; Union councils

The divisions of Balochistan (Balochi: تقسیمات بلوچستان Pashto: د بلوچستان برخې, Urdu: تقسیمات بلوچستان) are the first-order administrative bodies of the Balochistan province of Pakistan. In total, there are 11 divisions, which are further divided into districts.

== List of divisions ==
In Pakistan, the division is the administrative unit, which is higher in hierarchy than a district, but lower in hierarchy than a province.

Division	Districts	Area	Population (2023)	Population Density (2023)	Literacy rate (2023)	Map	Capital
Khuzdar Division	Khuzdar District; Kalat District; Wadh District; Surab District	41,208 km^{2} (15,910 sq mi)	1,547,812	37.5/km^{2}	39.39%		Khuzdar
Lasbela Division	Awaran District; Hub District; Lasbela District	44,463 km^{2} (17,167 sq mi)	859,935	19.3/km^{2}	39.05%		Lasbela
Loralai Division	Loralai District; Ziarat District; Musakhail District; Duki District	17,047 km^{2} (6,582 sq mi)	1,073,686	62.98/km^{2}	43.89%		Loralai
Zhob Division	Zhob District; Killa Saifullah District; Sherani District	27,128 km^{2} (10,474 sq mi)	957,579	34.19/km^{2}	34.33%		Zhob
Makuran Division	Gwadar District; Kech District; Panjgur District; Tump District	52,067 km^{2} (20,103 sq mi)	1,875,872	36.03/km^{2}	47.69%		Turbat
Naseerabad Division	Jaffarabad District; Jhal Magsi District; Nasirabad District; Sohbatpur District; Usta Muhammad District	9,447 km^{2} (3,648 sq mi)	1,601,347	169.5/km^{2}	34.23%		Dera Murad Jamali
Quetta Division	Quetta East District; Quetta West District; Mastung District	9,434 km^{2} (3,642 sq mi)	2,908,763	308.3/km^{2}	51.68%		Quetta
Pishin Division	Killa Abdullah District; Pishin District; Barshore District; Chaman District	11,112 km^{2} (4,290 sq mi)	1,663,671	292.55/km^{2}	51.68%		Pishin
Rakhshan Division	Chagai District; Washuk District; Nushki District; Kharan District; Western Chagai District	98,596 km^{2} (38,068 sq mi)	1,040,001	10.55/km^{2}	36.84%		Kharan
Koh-e-Sulaiman Division	Upper Dera Bugti District; Kohlu District; Barkhan District	14,963 km^{2} (5,777 sq mi)	635,552	42.47/km^{2}	34.70%		Rakhni
Sevi Division	Sibi District; Kachhi District; Dera Bugti District; Harnai District	15,934 km^{2} (6,152 sq mi)	1,046,548	34.0/km^{2}	34.70%		Sibi

== List of divisions by population over the years ==
Division	Pop. 2023	Pop. 2017	Pop. 1998	Pop. 1981	Pop. 1972	Pop. 1961	Pop. 1951
Khuzdar	1,547,812	2,509,230	1,443,727	...	...	...	...
Koh e Suleman	2,044,021	1,591,144	988,109	...	...	...	...
Loralai	1,152,400	898,209	309,748	...	...	...	...
Lasbela	1,152,400	898,209	309,748	...	...	...	...
Makran	1,875,872	1,489,015	832,753	...	...	...	...
Naseerabad	2,044,021	1,591,144	988,109	...	...	...	...
Pishin	2,044,021	1,591,144	988,109	...	...	...	...
Quetta	4,259,163	4,174,562	1,713,952	...	...	...	...
Rakhshan	10,40,001	737,162	409,473	...	...	...	...
Sibi	1,156,748	1,038,010	630,901	...	...	...	...
Zhob	957,579	806,238	468,695	361,647	171,989	...	...

== Proposed Division ==
- Chagai Division

it is a proposed division of balochistan province.The main purpose is to reduced lengths of large division(area wise).There will be three districts chaghi taftan and nushki

== See also ==
- Districts of Balochistan
- Tehsils of Balochistan
- Divisions of Pakistan
  - Divisions of Khyber Pakhtunkhwa
  - Divisions of Punjab
  - Divisions of Sindh
  - Divisions of Azad Kashmir
  - Divisions of Gilgit-Baltistan
