= Allai Tehsil =

Allai Tehsil تحصیل آلائی الائي تحصیل Area of Pakhli
- Tehsil
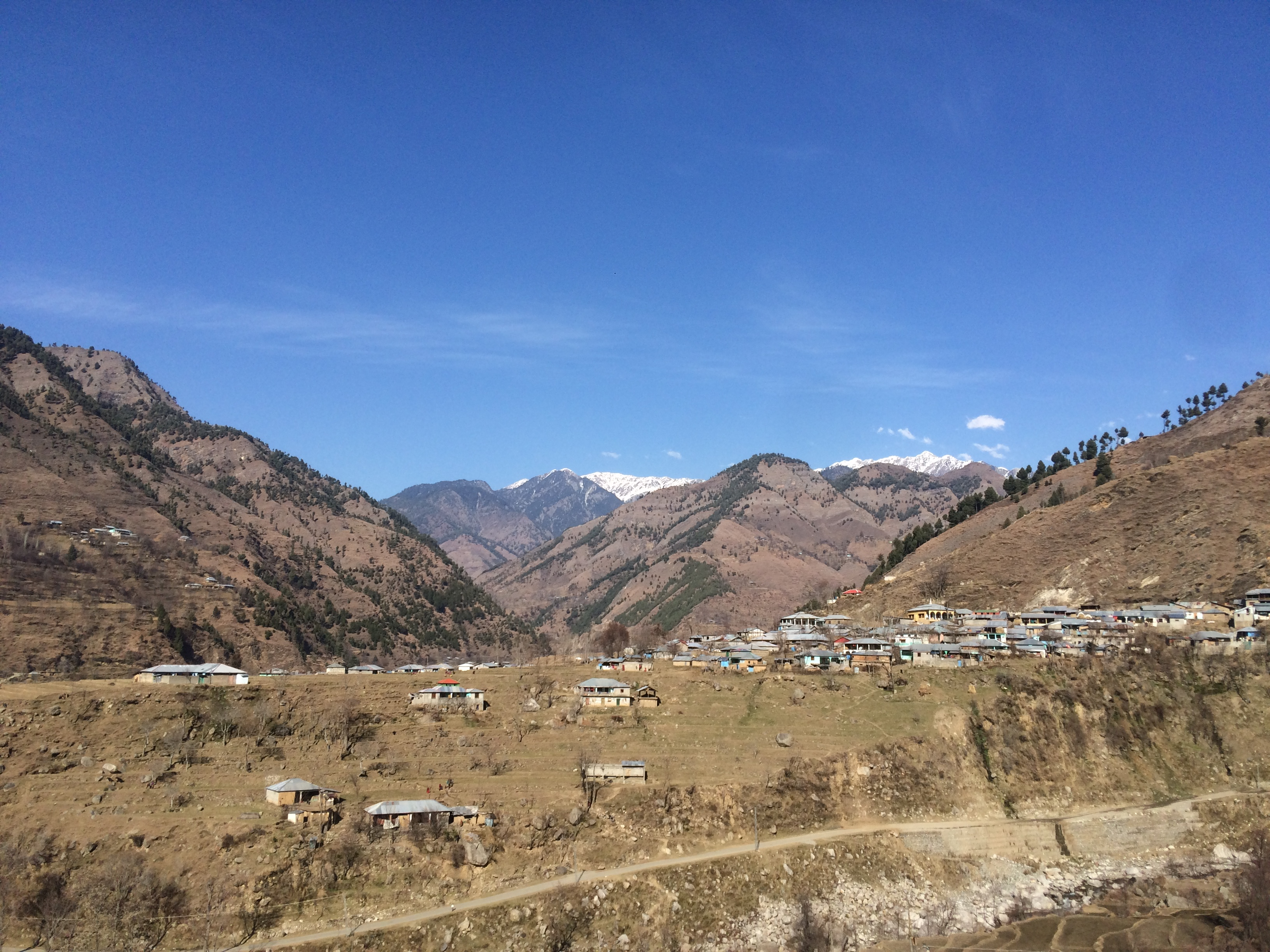

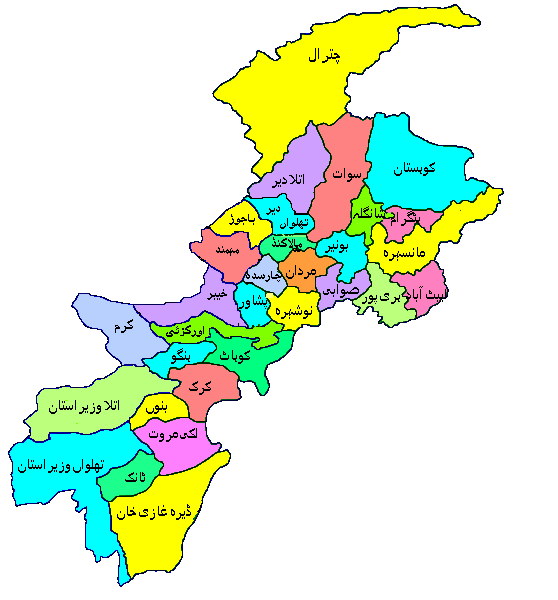

- Location within Khyber Pakhtunkhwa Location within Pakistan
- Coordinates: 34.8127°N 73.20665°E
- Country: Pakistan
- Province: Khyber Pakhtunkhwa
- District: Batagram District
- Region: Pakhli
- Headquarters: Allai

Government
  - MNA: Prince Muhammad Nawaz Khan (Chief Of Allai Valley) (JI)

Area
  - Tehsil: 804 km^{2} (310 sq mi)

Population (2023)
  - Tehsil: 218,149
  - Density: 271/km^{2} (703/sq mi)
  - Urban: 0
  - Rural: 218,149 (100%)

Literacy (2023)
  - Literacy rate: 35.71%

Allai is a tehsil of Allai District in Pakistan's Khyber-Pakhtunkhwa province. It is home to the Allai Valley and district headquarters. Prince Muhammad Nawaz Khan Swati is the current "Chief of Allai Valley".

== History ==
Allai tribal State (1595–1971)

Allai was formerly a state ruled by Nawabs of Allai. Nawab Muhammad Ayub Khan was the last Nawab of Allai State until 1971. This state had its own currency. Arsala Khan Swati was the most powerful ruler among the Nawabs of Allai as he is famous for his great resistance against British rule. Arsala Khan was also the Chief of Independent Swatis who defended Yaghistan with the support of Panjghol Swatis, Panjmeral Swatis, Arghushal Swati Khans of Thakot and Khankhail Swatis of Hill and Banser. Nawabs of Allai belong to the Bebal subsection of Gabri Swatis. Pokal was the capital of state.

Nawabs of Allai tribal State:

1- Ahmed Ali Khan Swati (Founder of State, 1595–1623)

2- Khan Raja Khan Swati (1623–1645)

3- Khan Muhammad Khan Swati (1645–1664)

4- Khan Nabi Khan Swati (1664–1685)

5- Khan Khawaja Muhammad Khan Swati (1685–1714)

6- Khan Gul Muhammad Khan Swati (1714–1746)

7- Khan Rustam Khan Swati (1746–1772)

8- Khan Hakim Khan Swati (1772–1805)

9- Khan Jamal Khan Swati (1805–1835)

10- Khan Arsala Khan Swati (1835–1890)

11- Nawab Ghazi Khan Swati (1890–1923)

12- Nawab Roshan Khan Swati (1923–1952)

13 - Nawab Ayub Khan Swati (1952–1989)

14- Akbar Namoos Khan Swati (1989–2024)

Current Chieftainship:

However the status of state has been abolished. Prince Muhammad Nawaz Khan Swati is the also the son of last Nawab Ayub Khan. Akbar Namoos Khan is the current Chief of Allai Valley instead of Nawab of Allai State.

People:

Majority of population of Allai belongs to different clans of Swati tribe same like the neighboring Battagram District and Mansehra District. Swatis own majority of lands in these three districts. The Nawabs of Allai also belongs to Bibaal subsection of Gabri Swatis.

=== 2005 earthquake ===
The Allai valley was affected by the Kashmir earthquake on October 8, 2005. The earthquake destroyed the cableway that allowed residents to cross the Indus River.

== Administration ==
Allai is only Tehsil, or subdivisions, of the Allai District. Allai contains eight Union Councils:

Previously, It was a tehsil of Battagram District till 2022.

Union Councils	Union Councils
Banna	Bateela
Batkul	Biari
Jambera	Pashto
Rashang	Sakargah

== Geography ==
The Allai Valley is bounded by Kohistan on the north and east by the Kaghan valley, Nandhiarh and Deshi of Deshiwals on the south, and by the Indus river on the west. The valley is divided from Kohistan on the north by a range of mountains rising over 4,900 metres (16,200 ft) and from Nandhiar and Deshi by another range running from the Afghanistan border to the Indus above Thakot. The average breadth of the Allai Valley is about 19–24 kilometres (12–15 mi) and the total area 520 square kilometres (200 sq mi). Forests cover the mountain slopes at the eastern end.

== Demographics ==
=== Population ===
Historical population
Year	Pop.	±% p.a.
1951	...	—
1961	21,963	—
1972	56,100	+8.90%
1981	134,955	+10.24%
1998	121,652	−0.61%
2017	180,502	+2.10%
2023	218,149	+3.21%

As of the 2023 census, Allai Tehsil had a population of 218,149.

== See also ==
- Allai District
- Batagram District
- Batagram Tehsil
