= Divisions of Pakistan =

Second-level administrative regions of Pakistan

- Map of divisions of Pakistan
- Category: Second-level administrative division
- Location: Islamic Republic of Pakistan
- Number: 40 (as of 2026)
- Government: Divisional government
- Subdivisions: Districts Tehsils Union councils

The administrative units of Pakistan contains four provinces, two administrative territories of the Kashmir region and a capital territory. The provinces and administrative territories are subdivided into 40 divisions. These divisions are further subdivided into districts, tehsils, and finally union councils. The divisions were abolished in 2000, but restored in 2008.

These divisions do not include the Islamabad Capital Territory. The formerly Federally Administered Tribal Areas, which were counted at the same level as provinces, have been subsumed into the Khyber Pakhtunkhwa province and allocated to neighbouring divisions therein in 2018.

== History ==
Administrative divisions had formed an integral tier of government from colonial times. The Governor's provinces of British India were subdivided into divisions, which were themselves subdivided into districts. At independence in 1947, the new nation of Pakistan comprised two wings – eastern and western, separated by India. Three of the provinces of Pakistan were subdivided into ten administrative divisions. The single province in the eastern wing, East Bengal, had four divisions – Chittagong, Dacca, Khulna and Rajshahi. The province of West Punjab had four divisions – Lahore, Multan, Rawalpindi and Sargodha. The North-West Frontier Province (as it was then called) had two divisions – Dera Ismail Khan and Peshawar. Most of the former Sind Province became Hyderabad Division. Most of the divisions were named after the divisional capitals, with some exceptions.

From 1955 to 1970, the One Unit policy meant that there were only two provinces – East and West Pakistan. East Pakistan had the same divisions as East Bengal had previously, but West Pakistan gradually gained seven new divisions to add to the original six. The Baluchistan States Union became Kalat Division, while the former Baluchistan Chief Commissioner's Province became Quetta Division. The princely State of Khairpur along with parts of Hyderabad division formed Khairpur Division. The former princely state of Bahawalpur became Bahawalpur Division, therefore joining West Punjab. The Federal Capital Territory was absorbed into West Pakistan in 1959, and merged with the district of Las Bela to form the Karachi-Bela Division in 1960. In 1969, the princely states of Chitral, Dir and Swat were incorporated into West Pakistan as the division of Malakand, with Saidu as the divisional headquarters. In 1975, Khairpur division was abolished and replaced with Sukkur Division. In 1980, Sukkur division was bifurcated to create Larkana division. In 1990, Mirpurkhas division created by bifurcation of Hyderabad division.

== New Divisions ==
When West Pakistan was dissolved, the divisions were regrouped into four new provinces. Gradually over the late 1970s, new divisions were formed; Hazara and Kohat divisions were split from Peshawar Division; Gujranwala Division was formed from parts of Lahore and Rawalpindi divisions; Dera Ghazi Khan Division was split from Multan Division; Faisalabad Division was split from Sargodha Division; Sibi Division was formed from parts of Kalat and Quetta divisions; Lasbela District was transferred from Karachi Division to Kalat Division; Makran Division split from Kalat Division. The name of Khairpur Division was changed to Sukkur Division and Headquarters of Khairpur Division shifted from khairpur to Sukkur. Shaheed Benazirabad is also a new division in Sindh.

During the military rule of General Zia-ul-Haq, the Advisory Council of Islamize Ideology (headed by Justice Tanzilur Rahman) was tasked with finding ways to Islamic the country. One of its recommendations was that the existing four provinces should be dissolved and the twenty administrative divisions should become new provinces in a federal structure with greater devolution of power, but this proposal was never implemented.

In the recent past (i.e. in last three decades), Naseerabad Division was split from Sibi Division; Zhob Division was split from Quetta Division; Bannu Division was split from Dera Ismail Khan Division; Mardan Division was split from Peshawar Division; Larkana Division were split from Sukkur Division and Shaheed Benazirabad Division Mirpur Khas Division was split from Hyderabad Division. Sahiwal Division was formed from parts of Lahore and Multan Divisions while Sheikhupura Division was formed from Lahore and Faisalabad Divisions. The capital of Kalat Division was moved from Kalat to Khuzdar. Rakhshan Division is recently added to Balochistan comprising parts of Quetta and Kalat Divisions with capital at Kharan.

In June 2021, Loralai Division was added to Balochistan, by splitting off from Zhob Division.

In 2026, Pishin Division, Koh-e-Sulaiman Division and Lasbela Division were added to Balochistan after the Government of Balochistan launched administrative reforms and restructuring across the province, Kalat Division was abolished and renamed to Khuzdar Division. Pishin was split from Quetta Division, Koh-e-Sulaiman was split from Zhob and Loralai Divisions, and Lasbela from the former Kalat Division.

== Abolition ==
In August 2000, local government reforms abolished the "Division" as an administrative tier and introduced a system of local government councils, with the first elections held in 2001. Following that there was radical restructuring of the local government system to implement "the principle of subsidiarity, whereby all functions that can be effectively performed at the local level are transferred to that level". This meant devolution of many functions, to districts and tehsils, which were previously handled at the provincial and divisional levels. At abolition, there were twenty-six divisions in Pakistan proper – five in Sindh, six in Balochistan, seven in Khyber-Pakhtunkhwa and eight in Punjab. Abolition did not affect the three divisions of Azad Kashmir, which form the second tier of government.

== Restoration ==
In 2008, after the public elections, the new government decided to restore the divisions of all provinces.

In Sindh after the lapse of the Local Governments Bodies term in 2010 the Divisional Commissioners system was to be restored.

In July 2011, following excessive violence in the city of Karachi and after the political split between the ruling PPP and the majority party in Sindh, the MQM and after the resignation of the MQM Governor of Sindh, PPP and the Govt. of Sindh decided to restore the commissioner system in the province. As a consequence, the five divisions of Sindh have been restored namely, Karachi, Hyderabad, Sukkur, Mirpurkhas and Larkana with their respective districts. One new division was added in Sindh, the Shaheed Benazirabad division.

Karachi district has been de-merged into its 5 original constituent districts namely Karachi East, Karachi West, Karachi Central, Karachi South and Malir. Korangi has been upgraded to the status of a sixth district of Karachi by splitting from Karachi East District. Recently Keamari District is formed by bifurcating Karachi West District. These seven districts form the Karachi Division now.

== Current divisions by administrative units ==
The following tables show the current total 40 divisions of Pakistan with 34 divisions by province i.e., 11 divisions of Balochistan, 7 divisions of Khyber Pakhtunkhwa, 10 divisions of Punjab, and 6 divisions of Sindh, with their respective populations as of the 2023 Census of Pakistan, and the 6 divisions of Pakistan–administered regions of Kashmir; 3 for Azad Kashmir and Gilgit-Baltistan each.

=== Provinces ===
==== Balochistan ====
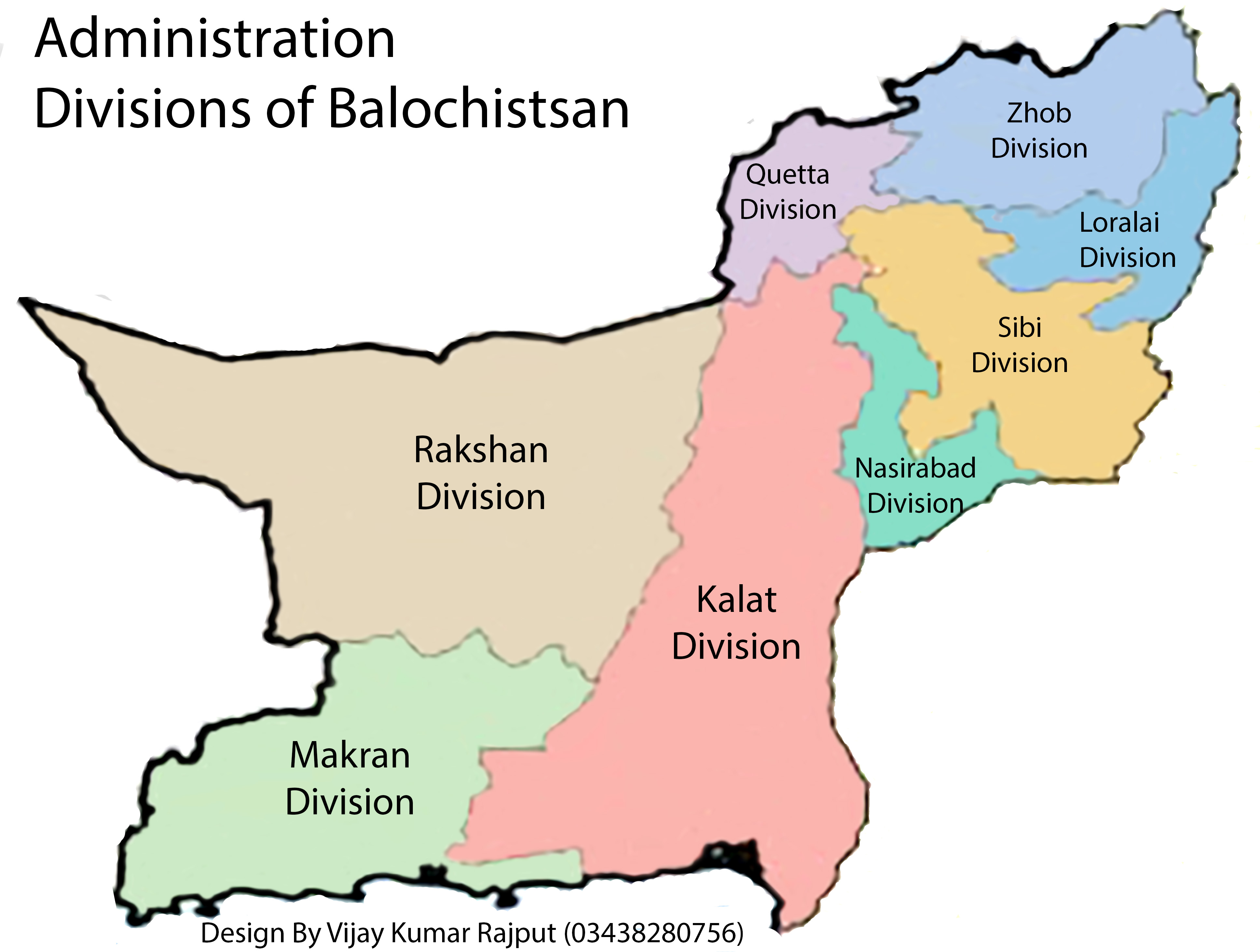
Eight divisions of the Province of Balochistan

In Pakistan, the division is the administrative unit, which is higher in hierarchy than a district, but lower in hierarchy than a province.

Division	Districts	Area	Population (2023)	Population Density (2023)	Literacy rate (2023)	Map	Capital
Khuzdar Division	Khuzdar District; Kalat District; Wadh District; Surab District	41,208 km^{2} (15,910 sq mi)	1,547,812	37.5/km^{2}	39.39%		Khuzdar
Lasbela Division	Awaran District; Hub District; Lasbela District	44,463 km^{2} (17,167 sq mi)	859,935	19.3/km^{2}	39.05%		Lasbela
Loralai Division	Loralai District; Ziarat District; Musakhail District; Duki District	17,047 km^{2} (6,582 sq mi)	1,073,686	62.98/km^{2}	43.89%		Loralai
Zhob Division	Zhob District; Killa Saifullah District; Sherani District	27,128 km^{2} (10,474 sq mi)	957,579	34.19/km^{2}	34.33%		Zhob
Makuran Division	Gwadar District; Kech District; Panjgur District; Tump District	52,067 km^{2} (20,103 sq mi)	1,875,872	36.03/km^{2}	47.69%		Turbat
Naseerabad Division	Jaffarabad District; Jhal Magsi District; Nasirabad District; Sohbatpur District; Usta Muhammad District	9,447 km^{2} (3,648 sq mi)	1,601,347	169.5/km^{2}	34.23%		Dera Murad Jamali
Quetta Division	Quetta East District; Quetta West District; Mastung District	9,434 km^{2} (3,642 sq mi)	2,908,763	308.3/km^{2}	51.68%		Quetta
Pishin Division	Killa Abdullah District; Pishin District; Barshore District; Chaman District	11,112 km^{2} (4,290 sq mi)	1,663,671	292.55/km^{2}	51.68%		Pishin
Rakhshan Division	Chagai District; Washuk District; Nushki District; Kharan District; Western Chagai District	98,596 km^{2} (38,068 sq mi)	1,040,001	10.55/km^{2}	36.84%		Kharan
Koh-e-Sulaiman Division	Upper Dera Bugti District; Kohlu District; Barkhan District	14,963 km^{2} (5,777 sq mi)	635,552	42.47/km^{2}	34.70%		Rakhni
Sevi Division	Sibi District; Kachhi District; Dera Bugti District; Harnai District	15,934 km^{2} (6,152 sq mi)	1,046,548	34.0/km^{2}	34.70%		Sibi

==== Khyber Pakhtunkhwa ====
Colours correspond to Divisions of the Province of Khyber Pakhtunkhwa

In Pakistan, the division is the administrative unit which is higher than a district, but lower than a province. Divisions and are separated by color on the map.

Division	Districts	Population (2023)	Area	Population Density (2023)	Literacy (2023)	Map
Bannu Division	Bannu District; Lakki Marwat District; North Waziristan District	3,092,078	9,975 km^{2} (3,851 sq mi)	309.98/km^{2}	42.11%	
Dera Ismail Khan Division	Dera Ismail Khan District; Lower South Waziristan District; Upper South Waziristan District; Paharpur District; Tank District	3,188,779	18,854 km^{2} (7,280 sq mi)	169.13/km^{2}	41.73%	
Hazara Division	Abbottabad District; Allai District; Batagram District; Haripur District; Kolai-Palas District; Lower Kohistan District; Mansehra District; Tor Ghar District; Upper Kohistan District	6,188,736	17,064 km^{2} (6,588 sq mi)	362.68/km^{2}	60.95%	
Kohat Division	Hangu District; Karak District; Kohat District; Kurram District; Orakzai District	3,752,436	12,377 km^{2} (4,779 sq mi)	303.18/km^{2}	50.89%	
Malakand Division	Bajaur District; Buner District; Central Dir District; Lower Chitral District; Lower Dir District; Malakand District; Shangla District; Swat District; Upper Chitral District; Upper Dir District; Upper Swat District	9,959,399	31,162 km^{2} (12,032 sq mi)	319.6/km^{2}	47.51%	
Mardan Division	Mardan District; Swabi District	4,639,498	3,175 km^{2} (1,226 sq mi)	1461.26/km^{2}	56.90%	
Peshawar Division	Charsadda District; Khyber District; Mohmand District; Nowshera District; Peshawar District	10,035,171	9,134 km^{2} (3,527 sq mi)	1098.66/km^{2}	51.32%	

==== Punjab ====
This section is an excerpt from Divisions of Punjab, Pakistan § List of divisions by population over the years.

Name	Headquarters	Districts	Area (km^{2})	Population (2023)	Population Density (2023)	Literacy rate (2023)	Map
Bahawalpur	Bahawalpur	Bahawalpur; Bahawalnagar; Rahim Yar Khan	45,588	13,400,009	293.94/km^{2}	52.13%	
Dera Ghazi Khan	Dera Ghazi Khan	Dera Ghazi Khan; Layyah; Muzaffargarh; Rajanpur; Taunsa; Kot Addu	38,778	12,892,465	332.47/km^{2}	48.00%	
Faisalabad	Faisalabad	Faisalabad; Chiniot; Toba Tek Singh; Jhang	17,918	16,228,526	905.71/km^{2}	68.80%	
Gujranwala	Gujranwala	Gujranwala; Narowal; Sialkot	7,779	11,416,686	937.11/km^{2}	76.41%	
Gujrat	Gujrat	Gujrat; Hafizabad; Mandi Bahauddin; Wazirabad	9,438	7,362,182	670/km^{2}	76.41%	
Lahore	Lahore	Lahore; Kasur; Nankana Sahib; Sheikhupura	11,727	22,772,710	1941.90/km^{2}	73.63%	
Multan	Multan	Multan; Lodhran; Khanewal; Vehari	15,211	14,085,102	925.98/km^{2}	59.43%	
Rawalpindi	Rawalpindi	Rawalpindi; Jhelum; Chakwal; Attock; Murree; Talagang	18,823	10,804,250	574.50	79.9%	
Sahiwal	Sahiwal	Sahiwal; Pakpattan; Okara	10,302	8,533,471	828.33/km^{2}	61.02%	
Sargodha	Sargodha	Sargodha; Bhakkar; Khushab; Mianwali	26,360	9,591,275	263.86/km^{2}	63.19%	

==== Sindh ====
Name	Headquarter	Districts	Area (km^{2})	Population (2023)	Pop. Density (2023)	Literacy rate (2023)	Map
Hyderabad Division	Hyderabad	Dadu District; Hyderabad; Jamshoro District; Matiari District; Tando Allahyar District; Tando Muhammad Khan District; Badin District; Sujawal District; Thatta District	48,670	11,659,246	239.56/km^{2}	45.38%	
Karachi Division	Karachi	Central; East; South; West; Korangi; Malir; Kemari	3,527	20,382,881	5,779.10/km^{2}	75.11%	
Larkana Division	Larkana	Jacobabad District; Kashmore District; Larkana District; Qambar Shahdadkot District; Shikarpur District	15,213	7,093,706	466.29/km^{2}	44.53%	
Mirpur Khas Division	Mirpur Khas	Mirpur Khas District; Tharparkar District; Umerkot District	28,170	4,619,624	153.99/km^{2}	40.41%	
Shaheed Benazirabad Division	Nawabshah	Naushahro Feroze District; Shaheed Benazir Abad District; Sanghar District	18,176	5,930,649	326.29/km^{2}	49.91%	
Sukkur Division	Sukkur	Ghotki District; Khairpur District; Sukkur District	27,158	6,010,041	221.30/km^{2}	59.72%	

=== Administered territories ===
Divisions of Azad Jammu & Kashmir
Division	Area (km^{2})	Population 1998 Census	Population 2017 Census	Population 2023 Census	Capital
Mirpur	4,388	1,198,249	1,651,018	N/A	Mirpur
Muzaffarabad	6,117	745,733	1,072,150	N/A	Muzaffarabad
Poonch	2,792	1,028,541	1,322,198	N/A	Rawalakot
Divisions of Gilgit-Baltistan
Division	Area (km^{2})	Population 1998 Census	Population 2017 Census	Population 2023 Census	Capital
Gilgit	-	N/A	N/A	N/A	Gilgit
Baltistan	-	N/A	N/A	N/A	Skardu
Diamer	-	N/A	N/A	N/A	Chilas

== List of all divisions by population, area, density, literacy rate etc. ==
List of the divisions by population, area, density, literacy rate etc.
Division	Population (2023)	Area (km^{2})	Density/ (km^{2}) (2017)	Literacy rate (2023)	Capital	Province
Islamabad	2,363,863	906	2214.76	83.97%	Islamabad	Islamabad
Dera Ismail Khan	3,188,779	9,005	224.21	41.73%	Dera Ismail Khan	KPK
Bannu	3,092,078	4,391	465.51	42.11%	Bannu	KPK
Kohat	3,752,436	7,012	316.45	50.89%	Kohat	KPK
Hazara	6,188,736	17,194	309.7	60.95%	Abbottabad	KPK
Malakand	9,959,399	29,872	251.56	47.51%	Saidu	KPK
Mardan	4,639,498	3,046	1312.43	56.90%	Mardan	KPK
Peshawar	10,035,171	4,001	1850.49	51.32%	Peshawar	KPK
Dera Ghazi Khan	12,892,465	38,778	284.04	48.00%	Dera Ghazi Khan	Punjab
Lahore	22,772,710	11,727	1654.14	73.63%	Lahore	Punjab
Faisalabad	16,228,526	17,917	791.26	68.80%	Faisalabad	Punjab
Bahawalpur	13,400,009	45,588	251.47	52.13%	Bahawalpur	Punjab
Gujranwala	11,416,686	7,779	937.11	76.41%	Gujranwala	Punjab
Gujrat	7,362,182	9,438	780.05	75.30%	Gujrat	Punjab
Multan	14,085,102	17,935	683.87	59.43%	Multan	Punjab
Rawalpindi	10,804,250	18,823	574.5	79.90%	Rawalpindi	Punjab
Sargodha	9,591,275	26,360	310.38	63.19%	Sargodha	Punjab
Sahiwal	8,533,471	10,302	520.57	61.02%	Sahiwal	Punjab
Karachi	20,382,881	3,528	4549.75	75.11%	Karachi	Sindh
Mirpur Khas	4,619,624	28,171	150.11	40.41%	Mirpur Khas	Sindh
Hyderabad	11,659,246	64,963	163.06	45.38%	Hyderabad	Sindh
Larkana	7,093,706	15,543	398.4	44.53%	Larkana	Sindh
Shaheed Benazirabad	5,930,649	18,175	290.63	49.91%	Shaheed Benazirabad	Sindh
Sukkur	6,010,041	34,752	159.37	49.72%	Sukkur	Sindh
Makran	1,875,872	52,067	28.6	47.69%	Turbat	Balochistan
Nasirabad	2,044,021	16,946	34.88	32.59%	Dera Murad Jamali	Balochistan
Quetta	4,259,163	64,310	64.91	51.68%	Quetta	Balochistan
Khuzdar	2,721,018	91,767	17.85	38.72%	Khuzdar	Balochistan
Sibi	1,156,748	27,055	38.37	34.70%	Sibi	Balochistan
Rakhshan	1,040,001	98,596	–	36.84%	Kharan	Balochistan
Zhob	927,579	27,128	34.2	32.33%	Zhob	Balochistan
Loralai	870,000	17,260	50.4	39.89%	Loralai	Balochistan
Mirpur	–	4,388	–	–	Mirpur	AJK
Muzaffarabad	–	6,117	–	–	Muzaffarabad	AJK
Poonch	–	2,792	–	–	Rawalakot	AJK
Gilgit	–	–	–	–	Gilgit	Gilgit-Baltistan
Baltistan	–	–	–	–	Skardu	Gilgit-Baltistan
Diamer	–	–	–	–	Chilas	Gilgit-Baltistan

== List of all divisions by population over the years ==
Data from 2023, 2017, 1998, 1981, 1972 censuses
Division	Pop. 2023	Pop. 2017	Pop. 1998	Pop. 1981	Pop. 1972	Pop. 1961	Pop. 1951	Province
Islamabad	2,363,863	2,006,572	805,235	340,286	–	–	–	Islamabad
Bahawalpur	13,400,009	11,464,031	7,635,591	4,068,636	–	–	–	Punjab
Lahore	22,772,710	19,398,081	12,015,649	7,183,097	–	–	–	Punjab
Dera Ghazi Khan	12,892,465	11,014,398	6,503,590	3,746,837	–	–	–	Punjab
Faisalabad	16,228,526	14,177,081	9,885,685	6,667,425	–	–	–	Punjab
Multan	14,085,102	12,265,161	8,447,557	5,408,561	–	–	–	Punjab
Rawalpindi	10,804,250	10,007,821	6,659,528	4,432,729	–	–	–	Punjab
Sargodha	9,591,275	8,181,499	5,679,766	3,930,628	–	–	–	Punjab
Sahiwal	8,533,471	5,362,866	4,271,247	–	–	–	–	Punjab
Gujranwala	11,416,686	9,783,183	6,101,052	3,934,861	3,218,873	2,587,061	1,835,178	Punjab
Gujrat	7,362,182	6,337,678	4,685,773	3,264,764	2,713,675	1,872,505	1,626,496	Punjab
Mirpur Khas	4,619,624	4,228,683	2,585,417	1,501,882	–	–	–	Sindh
Hyderabad	11,659,246	10,592,635	6,829,537	4,678,290	–	–	–	Sindh
Karachi	20,382,881	16,051,521	9,856,318	5,437,984	–	–	–	Sindh
Larkana	7,093,706	6,192,380	4,210,650	2,746,201	–	–	–	Sindh
Shaheed Benazirabad	5,930,649	5,282,277	3,510,036	2,560,448	–	–	–	Sindh
Sukkur	6,010,041	5,538,555	3,447,935	2,103,861	–	–	–	Sindh
Dera Ismail Khan	3,188,779	2,019,017	1,091,211	635,494	–	–	–	KPK
Bannu	3,092,078	2,044,074	1,165,692	710,786	–	–	–	KPK
Kohat	3,752,436	2,218,971	1,307,969	758,772	–	–	–	KPK
Hazara	6,188,736	5,325,121	3,505,581	2,701,257	–	–	–	KPK
Malakand	9,959,399	7,514,694	4,262,700	2,466,767	–	–	–	KPK
Mardan	4,639,498	3,997,677	2,486,904	1,506,500	–	–	–	KPK
Peshawar	10,035,171	7,403,817	3,923,588	2,281,752	–	–	–	KPK
Kalat	2,721,018	2,509,230	1,457,722	1,044,174	–	–	–	Balochistan
Nasirabad	2,044,021	591,144	1,076,708	699,669	–	–	–	Balochistan
Makran	1,875,872	1,489,015	832,753	652,602	–	–	–	Balochistan
Quetta	4,259,163	4,174,562	1,699,957	880,618	–	–	–	Balochistan
Sibi	1,156,748	1,038,010	630,901	305,768	–	–	–	Balochistan
Zhob	927,579	806,238	468,695	361,647	171,989	–	–	Balochistan
Loralai	870,000	736,209	487,748	–	–	–	–	Balochistan
Rakhshan	1,040,001	737,162	409,473	–	–	–	–	Balochistan
Mirpur	–	1,651,018	1,198,249	–	–	–	–	AJK
Muzaffarabad	–	1,072,150	745,733	–	–	–	–	AJK
Poonch	–	1,322,198	1,028,541	–	–	–	–	AJK
Gilgit	–	–	–	–	–	–	–	Gilgit-Baltistan
Baltistan	–	–	–	–	–	–	–	Gilgit-Baltistan
Diamer	–	–	–	–	–	–	–	Gilgit-Baltistan

== See also ==
  - Divisions of Balochistan
  - Divisions of Khyber Pakhtunkhwa
  - Divisions of Punjab
  - Divisions of Sindh
  - Divisions of Azad Kashmir
  - Divisions of Gilgit-Baltistan
- Districts of Pakistan
  - Districts of Khyber Pakhtunkhwa
  - Districts of Sindh, Pakistan
  - Districts of Punjab, Pakistan
  - Districts of Balochistan, Pakistan
  - Districts of Azad Kashmir
  - Districts of Gilgit-Baltistan
- Former administrative units of Pakistan
- Local government in Pakistan
