= Sherani District =

Sherani District ضلع شیرانی شېراني ولسوالۍ شݔرانی دمگ Sheerani
- District of Balochistan
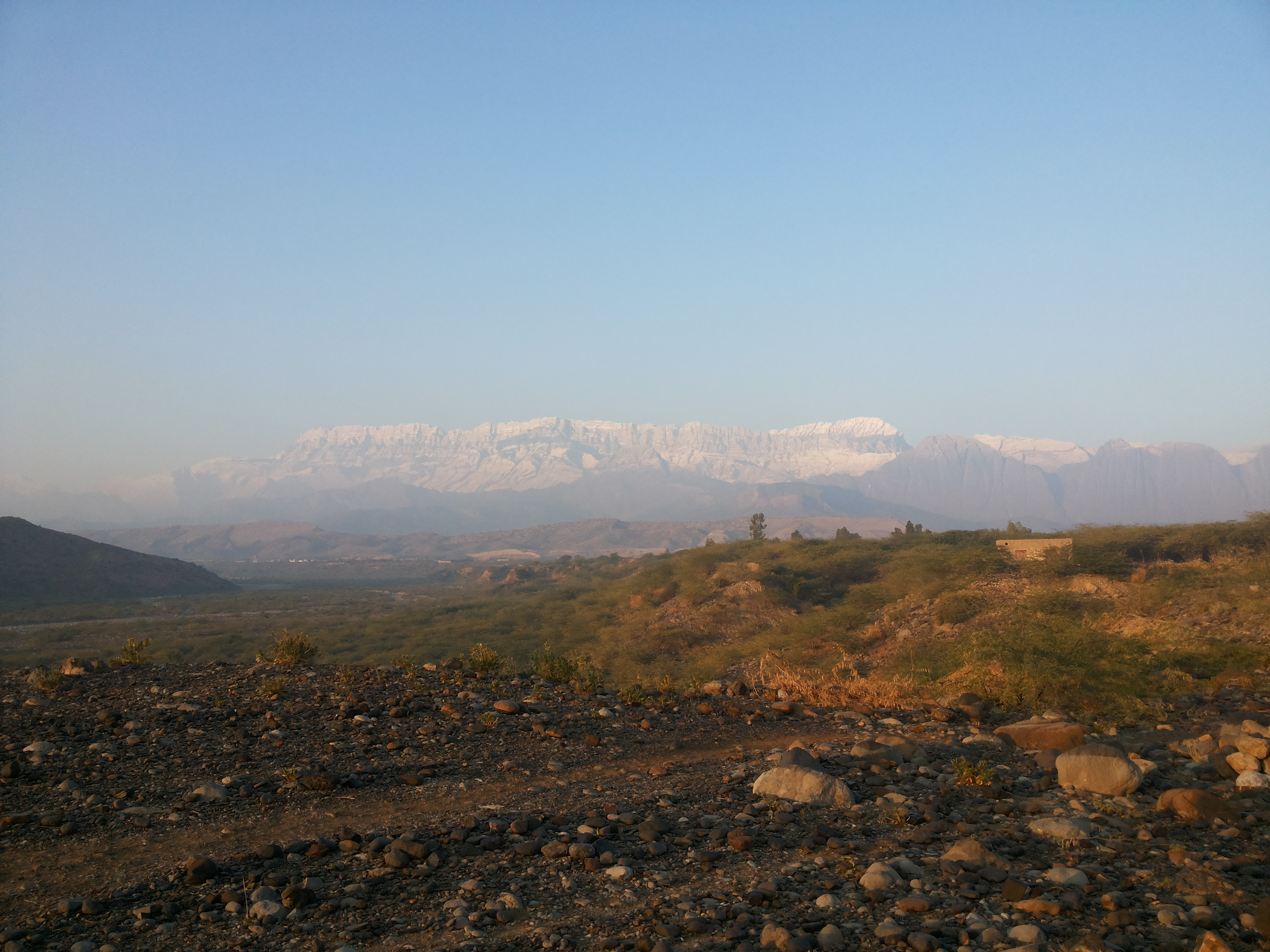
- Sulaiman Mountains from Sherani District

- Map of Balochistan with Sherani District highlighted
- Coordinates: 31.8316°N 69.7045°E
- Country: Pakistan
- Province: Balochistan
- Division: Zhob
- Established: 3 January 2006
- Headquarters: Stano Raaghah

Government
  - Type: District Administration
  - Deputy Commissioner: N/A
  - District Police Officer: N/A
  - District Health Officer: N/A

Area
  - District of Balochistan: 4,310 km^{2} (1,660 sq mi)

Population (2023)
  - District of Balochistan: 191,687
  - Density: 44.5/km^{2} (115/sq mi)
  - Urban: 0
  - Rural: 191,687

Literacy
  - Literacy rate: Total: (23.86%); Male: (31.53%); Female: (15.02%)
- Time zone: UTC+5 (PST)
- Total voters: 31,837.(Harifal, 8728; Sherani, 23,109)
- Number of Tehsils: 1
- Website: www.balochistan.gov.pk

Sherani or Shirani (Urdu: ضلع شیرانی) is a rural district in the Zhob Division of Balochistan province in Pakistan. The district is located within the Sulaiman Mountain Range, whose highest peak, Takht-e-Sulaiman, reaches the height of 3,487 metres (11,440 ft).

As of the 2023 census, it had a population of 191,687 people. Villages (also known as Dargah) in the district include: Ahmadi Dirga (also spelled as Ahmedi Dergga), Karama, Zarkai Landawar, Shinghar, Tsappar Kili, and Manikhawa (also known as Mani Kwa).

== Administration ==
Before 2006, Sherani was a sub-district of Zhob district. The new district was created on January 3, 2006.

Tehsil	Area (km²)	Pop. (2023)	Density (ppl/km²) (2023)	Literacy rate (2023)	Union Councils
Sherani Tehsil	4,310	191,687	44.47	23.86%	14

== History ==
The Shirani tribe lived for centuries in the frontier region that is now divided between Pakistan and Afghanistan. Qais Abdul Rashid (575-661 A.D.), who is believed to be one of the progenitors of the Pashtuns, lived in the Sulaiman Mountains.

Outside rulers had little control over the Shirani for much of their history. This changed in the late 19th century, as the British Empire expanded into the region. In the winter of 1890, British forces carried out the Khiderzai Expedition, a military campaign aimed at bringing the Shirani under colonial authority and securing the frontier. After the campaign, Shirani territory was brought into the British administrative system.

Mountstuart Elphinstone (1779–1859), a Scottish statesman and historian associated with the British government of India, visited the region in the early 19th century and said that the Shiranis were led by a "Neeka" who received an annual tax of one lamb and one calf from those who owned such animals. The Neeka functioned as both a judge and a commander-in-chief, with his authority believed to be derived from the conviction that he was "under the immediate guidance and protection of providence."

=== British occupation ===
The occupation of Appozai by the British Empire took place on 31 October 1890. By 13 November, all the principal points in Shirani were occupied. At Karama, a grand inquest was held into the conduct of the tribe and fines imposed, and the proceedings were terminated by a Durbar, at which the submission of the tribe was formally received and rewards conferred upon the deserving.

=== Events of the 21st century ===
On 8 June 2022, a minivan crashed in the Killa Saifullah District, killing 22 people. Rescue sources said that the bodies and injured were moved to Zhob and Mughal Kot. Less than a month later, on 3 July, a bus traveling from Rawalpindi to Quetta carrying 33 people fell into a ravine, killing at least 20 people and injuring 11 others near Sherani District.

== Geography ==
In the northeast of the Balochistan plateau, the Zhob and Sherani Basin form an oval surrounded by mountains.

In 1883, with the consent of the chiefs of the Sherani tribe (the inhabitants of the range), a survey party under Major Holdich, R.E., ascended the mountain, accompanied by a military escort. They found the summit of the ridge consisted of a long valley between two high rims, covered with Chilgoza Pine. At the north end of the western rim is the highest peak, known as Kaisa Ghar, 11,300 feet above sea level; at the south end of the eastern rim is Takht-e-Sulaiman, 3,441 metres (11,060 feet) above sea level.

A number of legends are associated with this place. One legend says Noah's Ark settled here after the Deluge, while others connect it with King Solomon and his throne, hence the name Takht-i-Suleiman (Throne of Solomon). Ranges west of the Takht-i-Suleiman contain strata of the Liassic (lower Jurassic) and middle Jurassic (about 208 to 146 million years ago).

In autumn 1897, an earthquake was felt in Sherani District, in which several houses in Ghurlama, Kacchi, Burkhurdar, and Pasta collapsed. No human or livestock loss was recorded.

== Demographics ==
Historical population
Year	Pop.	±% p.a.
1961	10,354	—
1972	25,384	+8.49%
1981	78,625	+13.39%
1998	81,684	+0.22%
2017	152,952	+3.36%
2023	191,687	+3.83%

According to the 1998 Population Census of Pakistan, the total population of Sherani District was 83,771. Of this population, 26,111 resided in the Harifal area, while 57,660 were settled in the Sherani area. Administratively, the district is subdivided into seven union councils: Kapip, Manikwa, Dhanasir, Mughal Kot, Ahmedi Derga, Shinghar Harifal South, and Shinghar Harifal North.

The total number of voters in the district was 31,837. According to the available electoral records, the Harifal area contained a total of 8,728 registered voters. In the Sherani area there were 23,109 registered voters.

As of the 2023 census, Sherani district has 36,100 households and a population of 191,687. The district has a sex ratio of 122.02 to 100 and a literacy rate of 23.86%. 75,400 (39.34% of the surveyed population) are under 10 years of age. The entire population lives in rural areas. 636 (0.33% of the surveyed population) are religious minorities, nearly all Christians. Pashto is the predominant language, spoken by 99.87% of the surveyed population.

== Villages ==
According to the 1998 census, there were 186 rural villages in Sherani district, though 16 of these were unpopulated.

Population of rural villages in Sherani district, according to the 1998 census.
Number	Village Name	Population in 1998	Households in 1998
1	Abu Sar	479	75
2	Aghberga Ragha	405	37
3	Ahmdi Dirgha	900	175
4	Astashai	1265	209
5	Atatazai	611	98
6	China	87	17
7	Ghundi Adam Khan	93	22
8	Ghund Ser	82	23
9	Ghundi Kohna	463	58
10	Gurgur Chinah	184	30
11	Karim Kachh	50	6
12	Kori Wasta Qurieshi	874	136
13	Kori Wasta Yasinzai	795	95
14	Kothah	371	45
15	Kuram Abu Thal	0	0
16	Nawab Kot	216	39
17	Niazi Kot	535	83
18	Sanni Zai	186	36
19	Sher Ghali	1268	134
20	Shinah Kazhah	388	46
21	Surlakai	1103	134
22	Turjana	395	61
23	Wala Shol	597	120
24	Aghburgai	435	50
25	Killi Gul Muhammad	545	75
26	Killi Khan Alam	3338	347
27	Killi Pir Muhammad	475	59
28	Mandao	655	84
29	Mushken Bund	118	17
30	Raghsar Manglazi	0	0
31	Sharo	673	67
32	Spin Shah	331	49
33	Surabah	0	0
34	Tangi Perowezan	785	104
35	Aghburga Wah	191	19
36	Algazzai	102	12
37	Anghushtai	235	38
38	Besh Lawara	1098	139
39	Chashmaragh	125	13
40	Daglawara	547	87
41	Dahana Sar Post	154	25
42	Dori	26	4
43	Ghagra	368	64
44	Gharing	421	74
45	Gharyasa Tarozai	185	38
46	Ghazi	0	0
47	Ghozai	0	0
48	Ghurwandi Zarghovilla	85	11
49	Ghuryasa	85	15
50	Ghuryasi	296	39
51	Hasar	492	62
52	Hasarkai Lowara	137	17
53	Kazah	121	15
54	Khawaja Wahi	295	41
55	Lawara	494	67
56	Macharogai	188	25
57	Mukhwai	108	21
58	Pasta, Taki karmanzai	89	20
59	Promah	142	21
60	Ragha Sar	354	52
61	Sara Kohnah	66	13
62	Sari Lawara	340	32
63	Sera Raiz	170	34
64	Shauha	456	71
65	Soroi Kani	441	66
66	Sozai	36	5
67	Spin Lawara	84	13
68	Tor Bandanar	261	25
69	Torkani	22	6
70	Wila Shoi	52	3
71	Zar Gawah	166	26
72	Zerpan	0	0
73	Anzar Khezai	1029	131
74	Aspasta Aghburga	2524	380
75	Ghurlama	860	132
76	Ibrahim Zai/Sozai	206	33
77	Ibrahimzai	280	41
78	Kachhe	358	35
79	Kahol Tirkai Lihkwan	279	62
80	Kamal Zai	568	77
81	Khanki Jallat	0	0
82	Khankai karmanzai	328	42
83	Karama karmanzai	941	87
84	Lehar Chopper Khail	1331	118
85	Lehar Karmanzai	872	101
86	Manikhwa	796	106
87	Mobi Tjwar Khar	185	16
88	Mosai Aziz Khan	944	59
89	Pasta karmanzai	709	115
90	Ragha Mina	757	75
91	Rusta Wusta Wast(Spal)	168	26
92	Siratoi Mena	282	43
93	Tairi Karmanzai	342	51
94	Uzhdan	391	42
95	Walmai karmanzai	513	82
96	Warghari	1205	123
97	Zara Killa	2344	348
98	Zarina Monah	160	33
99	Ziandi Miloo	797	51
100	Bhambrat	173	23
101	Chajobi	2069	222
102	Chaudai	90	12
103	Chur Kandi	174	43
104	Daghalo Kazha	110	12
105	Domandi	97	11
106	Duglor Zor	0	0
107	Gahai	190	22
108	Hota	106	8
109	Ingashai Pan	528	27
110	Kachh Mina	46	4
111	Kajal Khail	238	23
112	Karamachah	158	22
113	Karezai	131	24
114	Kazha	583	74
115	Khawazha	179	22
116	Khozai	60	15
117	Laghre Kazha	315	48
118	Lakai	0	0
119	Landai	191	18
120	Lio Band	183	18
121	Loghai Mena	0	0
122	Loi Raghah	642	69
123	Manah	109	13
124	Mankai	48	8
125	Mehrapai	328	50
126	Mir Ali Khail	452	63
127	Mughal Kot	705	76
128	Mughal Kot Malitia	0	0
129	Munga	14	4
130	Oshe Wasta	357	25
131	Ragha Karigran	910	83
132	Sarokai	525	74
133	Ser Qund	233	28
134	Serraggha	483	66
135	Sharun	355	54
136	Shen Narai	86	13
137	Shen Urmezai	200	31
138	Shenah Kohnah	610	36
139	Shenaki Kohnah	540	108
140	Shinah Pounga -I	878	98
141	Shinah Pounga-Ii	0	0
142	Shinalandai	1020	115
143	Tarkha Bayan	1010	89
144	Terkey Bayan	0	0
145	Tor Ghandi	1086	177
146	Tor Ragha	327	41
147	Tor Saman Zoi	406	71
148	Tora Murgha	304	57
149	Tungi Kohnah	556	49
150	Turwa Phail	0	0
151	Zara Kazha	359	28
152	Zebai Sar	314	38
153	Abrahim Khail	917	152
154	Arund Bund Munglzai	289	62
155	Babkow Zai	466	77
156	Behlol	2020	205
157	Daryakhan Zai	1361	139
158	Dwala Garh	688	142
159	Haudakai	522	60
160	Hurm Zai	588	63
161	Kachh Mulanica	442	83
162	Kazha Malizai	1058	100
163	Kot Mallezai	480	82
164	Lalukzai	275	32
165	Landai	161	26
166	Lor Khadazai	408	85
167	Malik Jankaz Khudazai	641	118
168	Pahlan	193	30
169	Phezai	357	54
170	Pustah	0	0
171	Ragha Surankan	566	67
172	Shah Umarzai	137	20
173	Sharn/Pai Mohammad	139	28
174	Shin Kowai	244	29
175	Shina Landai	1473	154
176	Shingar Hassanzai	308	32
177	Showangai	93	15
178	Shubkai Menzai	375	66
179	Shucha	0	0
180	Soor Ghar	74	6
181	Spinah	286	41
182	Sumezai	829	103
183	Tora Murgha	140	19
184	Trai Malazai	404	55
185	Zama	242	33
186	Zor Khar	776	119

== Education ==
Balochistan is the least literate province of Pakistan, with a literacy rate of 37%, compared to 54% nationally. The lack of secular education is more noticeable in Balochistan than in any other province, with 50% of children compelled to attend religious schools. The national budget for the MRA (Ministry of Religious Affairs) is around 1.2 billion rupees, whilst the secular education ministry is allocated 200 million.

There is only one intermediate college in the entire district, with 19 teachers and 70 students, and four high schools with 67 teachers, insufficient for the thousands of children seeking admission. All four high schools and the college are located in the Sherani District, whereas none are located in Harifal. Similarly, there are only eight middle-standard boys' schools with 263 enrolled students and 102 teachers in the whole district.

76 schools are working with one teacher and one room without any shelter. There are five registered Seminaries and five private schools. The NCHD is running five feeder schools. Teachers in these private schools work in a quack fashion and use very crude methods of teaching, including bastinado-type caning on the hands. 83% of schools are without electricity, 45% are without a boundary wall, 50% are without a toilet, and 35% are without drinking water.

== Flora ==
Sherani District has plant life typical of the dry mountains and plains of northern Balochistan. Most plants are shrubs, grasses, and small trees that can survive low rainfall, rocky ground, and grazing. The district lies within the wider Shinghar (Shin Ghar) mountain range and includes desert, steppe, and mountain vegetation.

In higher and more mountainous areas, natural woodland is mainly made up of Pistacia khinjuk (khinjuk pistachio), locally called shina, which forms the main tree cover on mountain slopes. This tree is legally protected, though some cutting for fuelwood has been reported in nearby areas. In plains and low-lying land, Tamarix aphylla (athel tamarisk) grows near seasonal streams and open ground, but its numbers have decreased locally due to harvesting.

Calotropis procera (Sodom's apple) is a common shrub in the district and grows widely in dry parts of Pakistan; the plant is known to be toxic and typically occurs in disturbed or overgrazed areas.

A plant survey in the Shinghar area recorded 102 wild plant species from 42 families and 88 genera, showing that the region supports a wide variety of plant life despite its dry conditions. Herbs made up most of the recorded species, followed by shrubs and trees. The most species-rich plant family was Asteraceae, with Lamiaceae, Poaceae, Solanaceae, Fabaceae, and Apocynaceae also well represented.

Many wild plants in the area are used by local communities for traditional medicine, food, animal fodder, fencing, and household needs. At higher elevations, forested areas also include Pinus gerardiana (chilghoza pine), which is valued for its edible nuts and local importance.

Plant life in the Sherani District faces ongoing pressure from grazing, fuelwood collection, and limited forest management. Published studies indicate, however, that the district and surrounding mountains continue to support a wide range of plant species typical of northern Balochistan.
