= Gandoi =

- Location within Pakistan
- Coordinates: 28.49°N 69.2°E
- Country: Pakistan
- Province: Balochistan
- Elevation: 250 m (820 ft)
- Time zone: UTC+5 (PST)

Gandoi is a town and union council of Dera Bugti District in the Balochistan province of Pakistan. It has an altitude of 250 metres (823 feet).
