= Baiker =

Baiker بیکڑ
- Town
- Location in Pakistan Baiker (Pakistan)
- Coordinates: 29°32′50″N 69°34′19″E
- Country: Pakistan
- Province: Balochistan
- District: North Dera Bugti District
- Tehsil: Qadirabad (formerly Phailawagh)
- Time zone: UTC+5 (PST)

Baiker is a town and union council of North Dera Bugti District in the Balochistan province of Pakistan. In 2006 the government of Pakistan announced that it was investing in various project in Balochistan including the Baiker area.

On January 9, 2025 Chief Minister of Balochistan Mir Sarfaraz Bugti announced a new district "Qadir Bugti Abad" where Baiker will the administrative headquarters of the district.

On February 26, 2026, Government of Balochistan created a new district after the bifurcation of Dera Bugti District into two separate districts Dera Bugti and Upper Dera Bugti. Baiker is the headquarter of North Dera Bugti.
