= Dilbar Mat =

Pakistani village

- Location within Pakistan
- Coordinates: 28.49°N 69.2°E
- Country: Pakistan
- Province: Balochistan
- Elevation: 250 m (820 ft)
- Time zone: UTC+5 (PST)

Dilbar Mat (Balochi:دلبر مت) is a town and union council in the Dera Bugti District of Balochistan, Pakistan. Dilbar Mat, some 30 km west of Sui town, lies at an altitude of 250 metres (823 feet).

== Political unrest ==
Dilbar Mat is affected by political unrest, human rights violations, and is repeatedly witnessing military operations of the Pakistani Army against insurgents. In December 2023, there were reports about a bigger military operation. In 2016, there were report about civilians kidnapped and killed. In 2013, six govt-formed peace forces were killed and 3 injured.
