= Pishin Division =

Administrative division of Balochistan, Pakistan

Pashin Division پشین ڈویژن تقسیم پشین
- Division
- Country: Pakistan
- Province: Balochistan
- Capital: Pashin
- Established: 2026

Government
  - Type: Divisional Administration
  - Commissioner: N/A
  - Regional Police Officer: N/A

Area
  - Division: 11,112 km^{2} (4,290 sq mi)

Population (2023)
  - Division: 1,663,671
  - Density: 42.47/km^{2} (110.0/sq mi)
  - Rural: 635,552

Ethnicities
  - People: Largest: Baloch (94.18%); Others: Others (5.73%)

Literacy
  - Literacy rate: Total: (51.89%); Male: (54.90%); Female: (28.88%)

Pashin Division (Urdu: پشین ڈویژن) is an administrative division with the headquarters is Pashin in Balochistan Province, Pakistan. It was bifurcated from Quetta division in 2026. Pishin, Killa Abdullah, and Chaman district was part of Quetta division and newly created district of Barshor were carved out from Pashin district.

== Administration ==
Territories of Pashin Division consists of:

- Pashin District
- Killa Abdullah District
- Chaman District
- Barshor District (established in 2026)
