= Zangiwal =

Village in Pakistan

Coordinates: 30°24′N 68°38′E

Zangiwal is a village located in the Loralai District of Balochistan, Pakistan.
