= Appozai =

- Town
- Location within Balochistan, Pakistan Location within Pakistan
- Coordinates: 31.20°N 69.25°E
- Country: Pakistan
- Province: Balochistan
- District: Zhob
- Time zone: UTC+5 (PST)

Appozai (Note: Urdu: اپوزئی, Balochi: اپوزئی, Pashto: اپوزئي) is town and union council of Zhob District in the Balochistan province of Pakistan. The capital of the district, Zhob, was originally known as Appozai.

== See also ==
- Zhob
  - Zhob District
  - Zhob Division
