= Pashto, Battagram =

Coordinates: 34°45′N 71°31′E

Pashto, Allai
- Town and union council
- Interactive map of Pashto, Allai
- Country: Pakistan
- Province: Khyber-Pakhtunkhwa
- District: Battagram District
- Tehsil: Allai Tehsil
- Time zone: UTC+5 (PST)

Pashto is a town, and one of twenty union councils in Battagram District of Khyber-Pakhtunkhwa, Pakistan.
