= Loralai District =

Loralai District ضلع لورالائی لورالايي ولسوالۍ لۏرالائی دمگ
- District of Balochistan
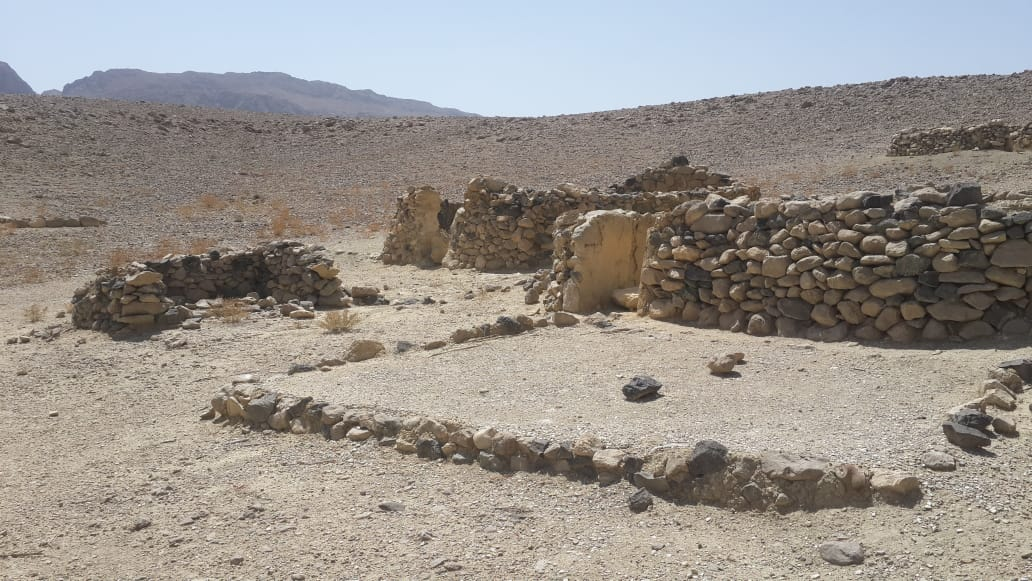
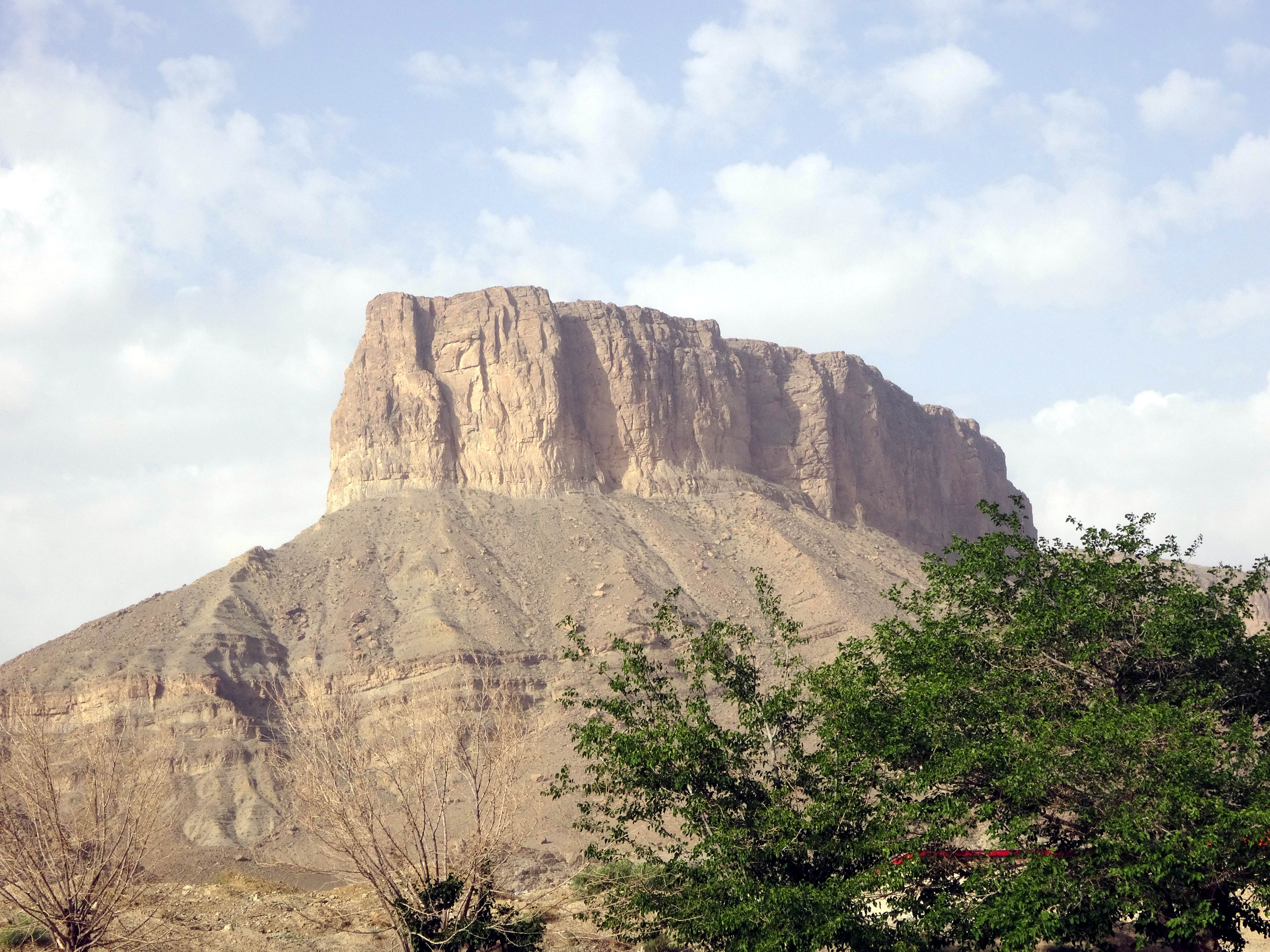
- Top: View of Rana Ghundi; Bottom: Chinjan

- Map of Balochistan with Loralai Division highlighted
- Coordinates: 30°20′N 69°00′E
- Country: Pakistan
- Province: Balochistan
- Division: Loralai
- Headquarters: Loralai

Government
  - Type: District Administration
  - Deputy Commissioner: Kashif Nabi
  - District Police Officer: N/A
  - District Health Officer: N/A

Area
  - District of Balochistan: 3,785 km^{2} (1,461 sq mi)

Population (2023)
  - District of Balochistan: 398,832
  - Density: 105.4/km^{2} (272.9/sq mi)
  - Urban: 231,841 (58.13%)
  - Rural: 166,990 (41.87%)

Literacy
  - Literacy rate: Total: (64.16%); Male: (54.27%); Female: (30.81%)
- Time zone: UTC+5 (PKT)
- Main Language(s): Pashto

Loralai District (Urdu: ضلع لورالائی) is a district in the northeast of Balochistan province of Pakistan. The town of Loralai serves as the district headquarters.

== Administration ==
Loralai District comprises the following two tehsils:

Tehsil	Area (km^{2})	Pop. (2023)	Density (ppl/km^{2}) (2023)	Literacy rate (2023)	Union Councils
Bori Tehsil	2,203	331,298	102.42	64.82%	...
Mekhtar Tehsil	1,582	67,534	29.58	36.55%	...

== Demographics ==
Historical population
Year	Pop.	±% p.a.
1961	10,519	—
1972	15,157	+3.38%
1981	27,482	+6.84%
1998	91,450	+7.33%
2017	272,098	+5.91%
2023	398,832	+6.58%

=== Population ===
As of the 2023 census, Loralai district has 58,214 households and a population of 398,832. The district has a sex ratio of 110.13 males to 100 females and a literacy rate of 64.16%: 54.27% for males and 30.81% for females. 98,407 (34.65% of the surveyed population) are under ten years of age. 231,841 (58.13%) live in urban areas.

=== Religion ===
In the 2023 census, 1,611 (0.6%) of the district population comprised religious minorities.

Religion in contemporary Loralai District
Religious group	1941		2017		2023	
Religious group	Pop.	%	Pop.	%	Pop.	%
Islam	15,722	84.23%	270,764	99.51%	396,439	99.40%
Hinduism	1,712	9.17%	578	0.24%	435	0.16%
Sikhism	1,116	5.98%	—N/a	—N/a	14	0.01%
Christianity	75	0.40%	540	0.22%	1,096	0.41%
Others	41	0.22%	83	0.03%	66	0.02%
Total Population	18,666	100%	272,098	100%	398,832	100%
Note: 1941 census data is for Bori tehsil of erstwhile Loralai Agency, which roughly corresponds to contemporary Loralai district. District and tehsil borders have changed since 1941.

Religious groups in Loralai District (British Baluchistan era)
Religious group	1911		1921		1931		1941	
Religious group	Pop.	%	Pop.	%	Pop.	%	Pop.	%
Islam	76,755	95.03%	78,451	95.12%	81,812	95.03%	79,273	94.73%
Hinduism	3,006	3.72%	3,631	4.4%	3,504	4.07%	3,129	3.74%
Sikhism	936	1.16%	289	0.35%	562	0.65%	1,124	1.34%
Christianity	71	0.09%	101	0.12%	209	0.24%	159	0.19%
Zoroastrianism	1	0%	0	0%	0	0%	0	0%
Jainism	0	0%	1	0%	0	0%	0	0%
Judaism	0	0%	0	0%	0	0%	0	0%
Buddhism	0	0%	0	0%	0	0%	0	0%
Tribal	—N/a	—N/a	—N/a	—N/a	0	0%	0	0%
Others	0	0%	0	0%	0	0%	0	0%
Total population	80,769	100%	82,473	100%	86,087	100%	83,685	100%
Note: British Baluchistan era district borders are not an exact match in the present-day due to various bifurcations to district borders — which since created new districts — throughout the region during the post-independence era that have taken into account population increases.

=== Language ===
Languages of Loralai district (2023)
1. Pashto (96.2%)
2. Balochi (1.13%)
3. Saraiki (0.97%)
4. Punjabi (0.72%)
5. Others (0.93%)

At the time of the 2023 census, 96.25% of the population spoke Pashto, 1.13% Balochi, 0.97% Saraiki and 0.72% Punjabi as their first language.

== Education ==
- University of Loralai

According to the Pakistan District Education Rankings, district Loralai is ranked at number 90 out of the 141 ranked districts in Pakistan on the education score index. This index considers learning, gender parity and retention in the district.

The literacy rate in 2014–15 of the 10 years and older population in the district was estimated at 44% whereas for females it was only 22%.

Post primary access is a major issue in the district with 89% schools being at primary level. Whereas high schools constitute only 3% of government schools in the district. This is also reflected in the enrolment figures for academic year 2016–17 with 12,192 students enrolled in class 1 to 5 and only 586 students enrolled in class 9 and 10.

Gender disparity is another issue in this district. Only 28% schools in the district are girls schools. Access to education for girls is a major issue in the district and is also reflected in the low literacy rates of females.

Moreover, the schools in the district lack basic facilities. According to Alif Ailaan district education rankings 2017, the district is ranked at number 135 out of the 155 districts of Pakistan for primary school infrastructure. At the middle school level, it is ranked at number 137 out of the 155 districts. These rankings take into account the basic facilities available in schools including drinking water, working toilet, availability of electricity, existence of a boundary wall and general building condition. 7 out of 10 schools do not have electricity in them whereas 3 out of 4 schools lack a toilet and more than half of the schools do not have a boundary wall. 2 out of 5 schools do not have clean drinking water.

== Localities ==
- Loralai
- Zangiwal

== See also ==
- Districts of Pakistan
  - Districts of Khyber Pakhtunkhwa, Pakistan
  - Districts of Punjab, Pakistan
  - Districts of Balochistan, Pakistan
  - Districts of Sindh, Pakistan
  - Districts of Azad Kashmir
  - Districts of Gilgit-Baltistan
- Divisions of Pakistan
  - Divisions of Balochistan
  - Divisions of Khyber Pakhtunkhwa
  - Divisions of Punjab
  - Divisions of Sindh
  - Divisions of Azad Kashmir
  - Divisions of Gilgit-Baltistan

== Bibliography ==
- 1998 District Census report of Loralai. Census publication. Vol. 118. Islamabad: Population Census Organization, Statistics Division, Government of Pakistan. 2000.
