= Zhob Division =

Administrative division of Balochistan, Pakistan

Coordinates: 30°54′N 69°01′E

Zhob Division ژوب ڈویژن ږوب څانګه ژۏب ولایت
- Division
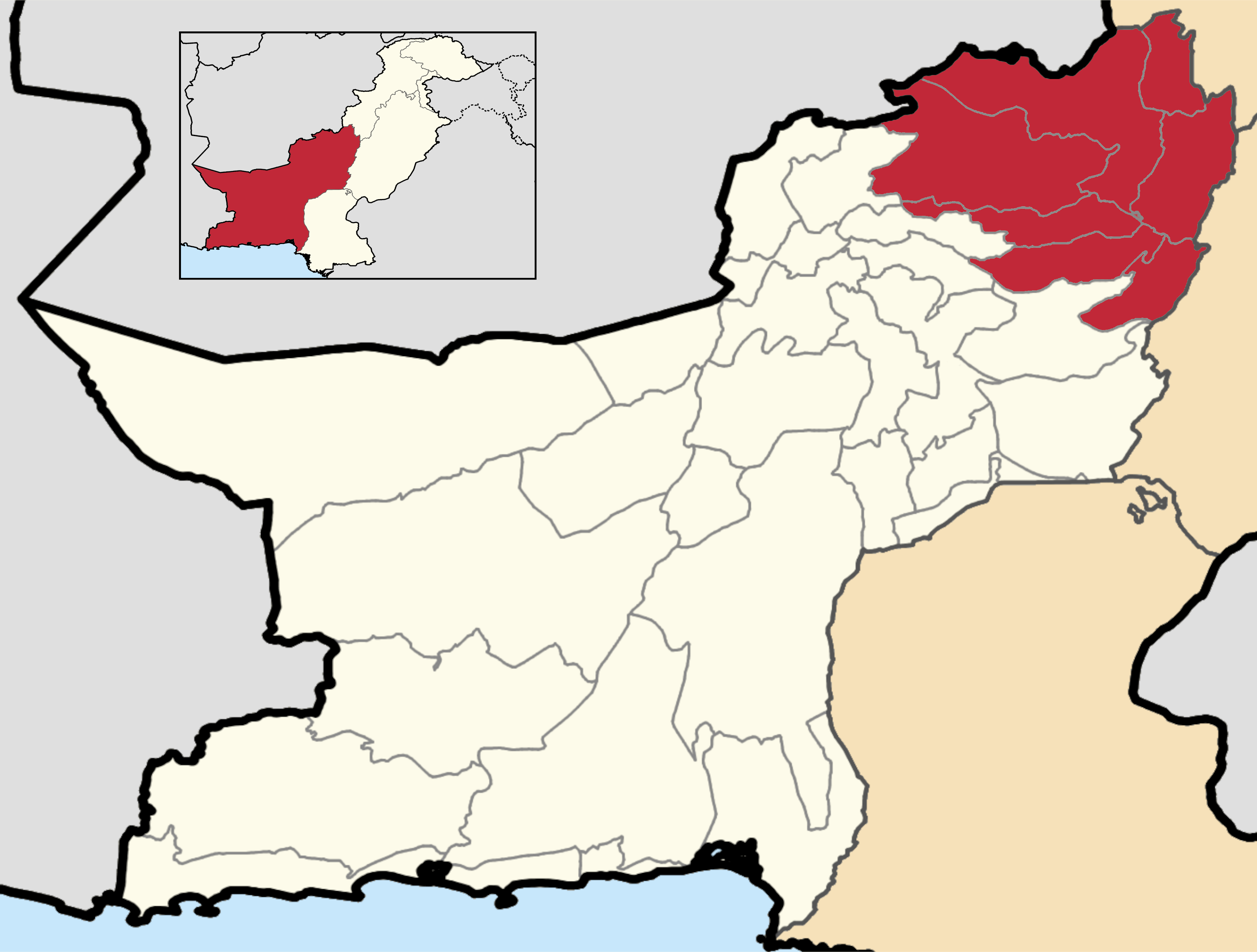
- Map of Zhob Division
- Country: Pakistan
- Province: Balochistan
- Capital: Zhob
- Established: 1988

Government
  - Type: Divisional Administration
  - Commissioner: N/A
  - Regional Police Officer: N/A

Population (2023)
  - Division: 927,579
  - Urban: 11.98%
  - Rural: 88.02%

Ethnicities
  - People: Largest: Pashtuns (98.88%); Others: Balochs (0.12%)

Literacy
  - Literacy rate: Total: (32.33%); Male: (41.69%); Female: (21.93%)
- Website: zhob.balochistan.gov.pk

Zhob Division is an administrative division of Balochistan Province, Pakistan. It was created in 1988 bifurcated from Quetta division. It remained abolished between 2000 and 2008 during the military rule of Pervez Musharraf, but later restored when his rule ended. CNIC Code of Zhob Division is 56.

Loralai Division is carved after splitting Zhob Division, consisting of Barkhan District, Loralai District, Musakhail District and Duki District.

== Demographics ==
=== Population ===
Historical population
Year	Pop.	±% p.a.
1951	...	—
1961	...	—
1972	171,989	—
1981	361,647	+8.61%
1998	468,695	+1.54%
2017	806,238	+2.90%
2023	927,579	+2.36%

According to 2023 census, Zhob division had a population of 927,579, roughly equal to the population of Mauritius or the US state of Delaware.

== Districts ==
#	District	Headquarter	Area (km^{2})	Pop. (2023)	Density (ppl/km^{2}) (2023)	Lit. rate (2023)
1	Zhob	Zhob	15,987	355,692	22.2	36.62%
2	Qilla Saifullah	Qilla Saifullah	6,831	380,200	55.7	32.96%
3	Sherani	Sherani	4,310	191,687	44.5	23.86%

== Tehsils ==
#	Tehsil	Area (km^{2})	Pop. (2023)	Density (ppl/km^{2}) (2023)	Literacy rate (2023)	Districts
1	Killa Saifullah Tehsil	1,103	152,516	138.27		Qila Saifullah
2	Loiband Tehsil	972	29,693	30.55		Qila Saifullah
3	Muslim Bagh Tehsil	943	83,795	88.86		Qila Saifullah
4	Badini	985	20,640	20.95		Qila Saifullah
5	Kanmetharzai Tehsil	383	34,298	89.55		Qila Saifullah
6	Shinki Tehsil	2,445	59,258	24.24		Qila Saifullah
7	Qamar Din Karez Tehsil					Zhob
8	Zhob Tehsil	9,322	284,620	30.53		Zhob
9	Ashwat Tehsil	901	25,094	27.85		Zhob
10	Kashatu Tehsil	1,590	5,810	3.65		Zhob
11	Sambaza Tehsil	2,888	25,150	8.71		Zhob
12	Sherani Tehsil	4,310	191,687	44.47		Sherani

== Constituencies ==
District	Provincial Assembly Constituency	National Assembly Constituency
Sherani	PB-1 Sherani-Cum-Zhob	NA-251 Sherani-cum-Zhob-cum-Killa Saifullah
Zhob	PB-1 Sherani-Cum-Zhob	NA-251 Sherani-cum-Zhob-cum-Killa Saifullah
Zhob	PB-2 Zhob	NA-251 Sherani-cum-Zhob-cum-Killa Saifullah
Killa Saifullah	PB-3 Killa Saifullah	NA-251 Sherani-cum-Zhob-cum-Killa Saifullah

== Demographics ==
According to the 2023 census, Zhob division had a population of 927,579.

== See also ==
- Districts of Pakistan
  - Districts of Balochistan
- Tehsils of Pakistan
  - Tehsils of Balochistan
- Divisions of Pakistan
  - Divisions of Balochistan
  - Divisions of Khyber Pakhtunkhwa
  - Divisions of Punjab
  - Divisions of Sindh
  - Divisions of Azad Kashmir
  - Divisions of Gilgit-Baltistan
