= Koh-e-Sulaiman Division =

Administrative division of Balochistan, Pakistan

Koh-e-Sulaiman Division کوہ سلیمان تقسیم د کوه سلیمان څانګه تقسیم کوہ سلیمان کوہ سلیمان ڈویژن
- Division
- Country: Pakistan
- Province: Balochistan
- Capital: Rakhni
- Established: 2026

Government
  - Type: Divisional Administration
  - Commissioner: N/A
  - Regional Police Officer: N/A

Area
  - Division: 14,963 km^{2} (5,777 sq mi)

Population (2023)
  - Division: 635,552
  - Density: 42.47/km^{2} (110.0/sq mi)
  - Rural: 635,552

Ethnicities
  - People: Largest: Baloch (94.18%); Others: Others (5.73%)

Literacy
  - Literacy rate: Total: (51.89%); Male: (54.90%); Female: (28.88%)

Koh-e-Sulaiman Division (Balochi: کوہ سلیمان تقسیم Urdu: کوہِ سُلَیمان ڈویژن) is an administrative division with the headquarters is Rakhni in Balochistan Province, Pakistan. It was bifurcated from Zhob division and Loralai division in 2026. Kohlu district and newly created district of Upper Dera Bugti were carved out from Sibi division where as Baloch majority Barkhan district was carved out from Loralai/ Zhob division. Baloch majority areas of Anderpur, Rarasham were given status of Tehsil and were merged into Barkhan district of Koh e Sulaiman division from Musakhel district due to will of Buzdar tribe in joining new division.

== HISTORY ==
Koh e Sulaiman division comprises three districts. Northern most parts of division are inhabited by Buzdar tribe, where as Khetran tribe forms majority in Barkhan district, headquarter of division Rakhni is also primarily inhabited by Khetran tribe, Marri tribe forms majority in Kohlu which is central district of division, where as Upper Dera Bugti district is inhabited by Bugti tribe. Other minor tribes of division includes Leghari and Zarkoon tribe.

Koh e sulaiman division is named after Koh e Sulaiman range which runs parallel to division in its eastern portion along with border with Punjab province.
