= Chaman District =

District in Balochistan, Pakistan

Chaman District ضلع چمن
- District
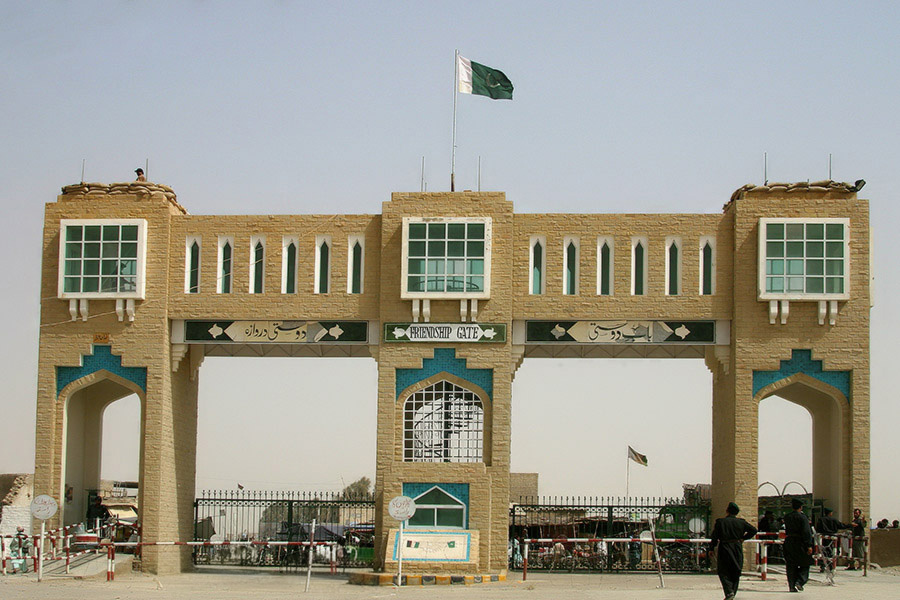
- Pakistan-Afghanistan Friendship Gate

- Map of Balochistan with Chaman District highlighted in maroon
- Country: Pakistan
- Province: Balochistan
- Divisions: Quetta
- Established: 2021
- Headquarters: Chaman

Government
  - Type: District Administration
  - Deputy Commissioner: N/A
  - District Chairman: Haji Amanullah (JUI(F))
  - District Vice Chairman: Majeed Khan Achakzai (BAP)

Area
  - District: 1,341 km^{2} (518 sq mi)

Population (2023 Census of Pakistan)
  - District: 466,218
  - Density: 347.7/km^{2} (900.4/sq mi)
  - Urban: 130,139 (27.91%)
  - Rural: 336,079 (72.09%)

Literacy
  - Literacy rate: Total: (39.97%); Male: (47.73%); Female: (30.60%)
- Time zone: UTC+5 (PKT)

Chaman District (Note: Pashto: چمن ولسوالۍ and Urdu: ضلع چمن) is located in the northwest of Balochistan, Pakistan. Chaman District was created after the bifurcation of Qila Abdullah District in 2021.

== Administrative divisions ==
It contains the following Tehsils:

Tehsil	Area (km²)	Pop. (2023)	Density (ppl/km²) (2023)	Literacy rate (2023)	Union Councils
Chaman Tehsil	22	130,139	5,915.41	51.36%	...
Chaman Saddar Tehsil	1,319	336,079	254.80	35.18%	...

== Demographics ==
Historical population
Year	Pop.	±% p.a.
1961	26,087	—
1972	47,692	+5.64%
1981	68,848	+4.16%
1998	151,854	+4.76%
2017	434,561	+5.69%
2023	466,218	+1.18%

As of the 2023 census, Chaman district has 61,915 households and a population of 466,218. The district has a sex ratio of 127.40 males to 100 females and a literacy rate of 39.97%: 47.73% for males and 30.60% for females. 182,044 (39.05% of the surveyed population) are under 10 years of age. 130,139 (27.91%) live in urban areas. 1,654 (0.35% of the surveyed population) are religious minorities, mainly Christians and some Hindus. Pashto is the predominant language, spoken by 99.37% of the population.

== See also ==
- Divisions of Pakistan
- List of districts in Balochistan
