= Jambera =

- Town and union council
- Country: Pakistan
- Province: Khyber-Pakhtunkhwa
- District: Battagram District
- Time zone: UTC+5 (PST)

Jambera is a town, and one of twenty union councils in Battagram District in the Khyber-Pakhtunkhwa province of Pakistan. It is situated on the bank of the river Indus and population of the union council is about 15,000. The union council of Jambera has three village councils: Jambera, Cheran, and Kund.There is also a cricket ground in jambera named Abbaseen cricket ground jambera and one volleyball ground(star ground). There is also public school in Jambira named star model public high school. Nawab Zada Abdul Ghafoor Khan is currently Member of District Council from Union Council Jambera. And Also chairman of Village council Jambera

Nawab Zada Abdul Ghafoor khan won 3 times Municipal election from Union council Jambera [1]
