= Biari =

- Town and union council
- Location in Pakistan
- Coordinates: 34°38′30″N 73°24′0″E
- Country: Pakistan
- Region: Khyber-Pakhtunkhwa
- District: Battagram District
- Elevation: 1,904 m (6,247 ft)
- Time zone: UTC+5 (PST)

Biari is a town, and one of twenty union councils in Battagram District in Khyber-Pakhtunkhwa province of Pakistan. It is located at 34°38'30N 73°24'0E and has an altitude of 1904 metres (6249 feet).
