= Banna (Battagram) =

Coordinates: 34°50′N 73°04′E

Banna, Khyber Pakhtunkhwa
- Town and union council
- Interactive map of Banna, Khyber Pakhtunkhwa
- Country: Pakistan
- Region: Khyber Pakhtunkhwa
- District: Batagram District
- Time zone: UTC+5 (PST)

Banna is a town, and one of sixti seven union councils in Battagram District in the Khyber Pakhtunkhwa province of Pakistan.
