= Rashang =

- Town and union council
- Location in Pakistan
- Coordinates: 34°49′10″N 73°7′30″E
- Country: Pakistan
- Province: Khyber-Pakhtunkhwa
- District: Battagram District
- Elevation: 1,970 m (6,460 ft)
- Time zone: UTC+5 (PST)

Rashang is a village in Battagram District of Khyber-Pakhtunkhwa. It is located at 34°49'10N 73°7'30E at an altitude of 1,970 metres (6,460 ft).
