= Bateela =

- Town and union council
- Country: Pakistan
- Region: Khyber Pakhtunkhwa
- District: Batagram District
- Time zone: UTC+5 (PST)

Bateela is a town, and one of twenty union councils in Battagram District in the Khyber Pakhtunkhwa province of Pakistan.
