= Batkul =

Union Council Batkul
- Town and union council
- Country: Pakistan
- Region: Khyber Pakhtunkhwa
- District: Batagram District

Area
  - Total: 102 km^{2} (39 sq mi)
- Time zone: UTC+5 (PST)
- Area code: 12040

Unioun Council Batkul is a town, and one of twenty union councils in Battagram District in the Khyber Pakhtunkhwa province of Pakistan. The village is composed of eight small Village Councils. 1,Hutal Batkool Vc secretary Nazir UL Haq 2, Aban Batkool Vc secretary Laiq zada 3, Kanai Batkool Vc secretary Bakht Rasheed 4, Qala Batkool Vc Secretary Bakht Rasheed 5, Bab Batkool Vc secretary Taj wahab and 6, Surgai Batkool Vc secretary Ubaid ullah. The entire population of the village belongs to the same tribe and are Akhund Khails the sons of Akhund Drveza Baba. His original name was Abull Rashed Sahaib, an accomplished scholar of formal outward religion, a mystic‚ and an accomplished poet in Pashto and Persian. Here is BHU a BHO High School and مدرسہ تعلیم القرآن.The other BHU and a High School is in VC kannai Batkool.while there is no BHU and High School in other village Councils.There is no middle or High school in These six Village councils and that is the main Reason that there is no education of females. The source of most income of the people is from overseas.
