= Lasbela =

Lasbela may refer to:

- Lasbela (princely state) of British India and Pakistan
- Lasbela Division in Balochistan, Pakistan
- Lasbela District in Balochistan, Pakistan
- Lasbela (Karachi), a neighbourhood in Karachi, Pakistan
- Lasbela Bridge in Karachi
