= Sakargah =

Coordinates: 34°55′N 72°58′E

- Town and union council
- Interactive map of Sakargah
- Country: Pakistan
- Region: Khyber Pakhtunkhwa
- District: Battagram District
- Time zone: UTC+5 (PST)

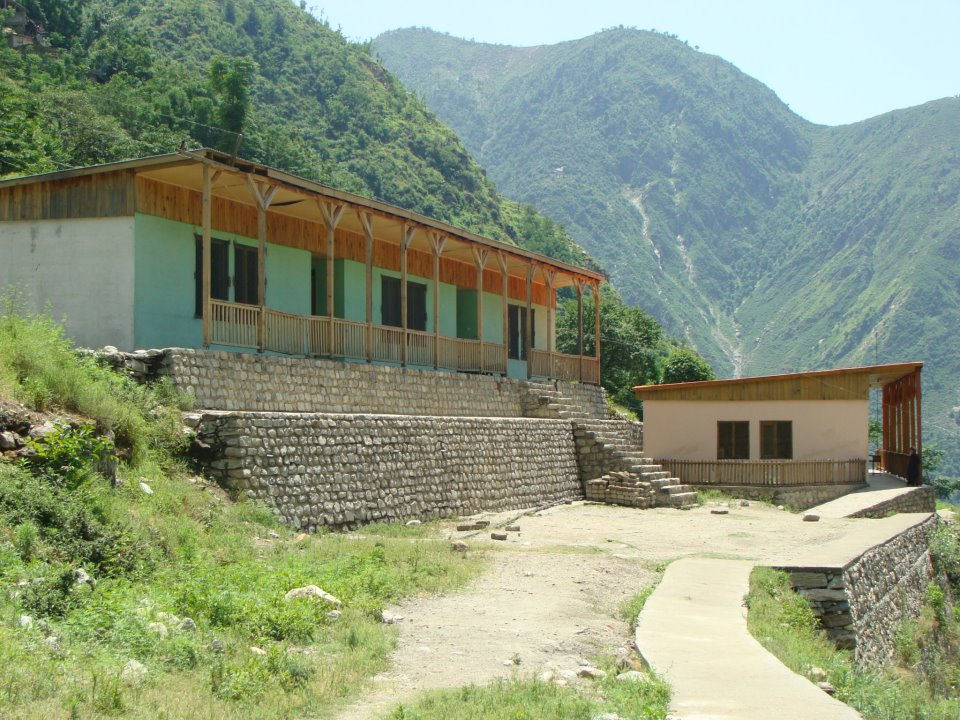

Sakargah is a town, and one of twenty union councils in Battagram District in the Khyber Pakhtunkhwa Province of Pakistan.
