= Rakhni =

Coordinates: 30°3′0″N 69°55′0″E

Rakhni: رکھنی; رکنی
- Union Council
- Interactive map of Rakhni
- Country: Pakistan
- Region: Balochistan
- District: Barkhan District
- Elevation: 1,050 m (3,440 ft)
- Time zone: UTC+5 (PST)

Rakhni (Balochi: رکنی; Urdu: رکھنی) also known as Rakni, is a town and union council of Barkhan District in the Balochistan, Pakistan. It has been selected as headquarter of newly created Koh-e-Sulaiman Division.

== Geography ==
It is located on foothills of Sulaiman Mountains at an altitude of 1,093 metres (3,586 ft) close to Punjab and Balochistan border near Fort Munro. It is home to Khetran tribe, other tribes in area are Buzdar, Leghari, Hasni, and Marris.

== Demographics ==
The major source of income is livestock. Sixty percent of people earn through livestock, thirty percent through cultivation and the remaining ten percent through other professions.

Khetrani and Hasanki is the main language of the town, where Balochi is also spoken.

== Climate ==
In summer the weather is usually hot. In winter, there is snow on the nearest mountains peaks.

== See also ==
- Outline of Pakistan
