= South Dera Bugti District =

District in Balochistan, Pakistan

Coordinates: 28°50′N 69°00′E

Dera Bugti District ضلع ڈیرہ بگٹی ڈئره بگٹیءِ دمگ
- District of Balochistan
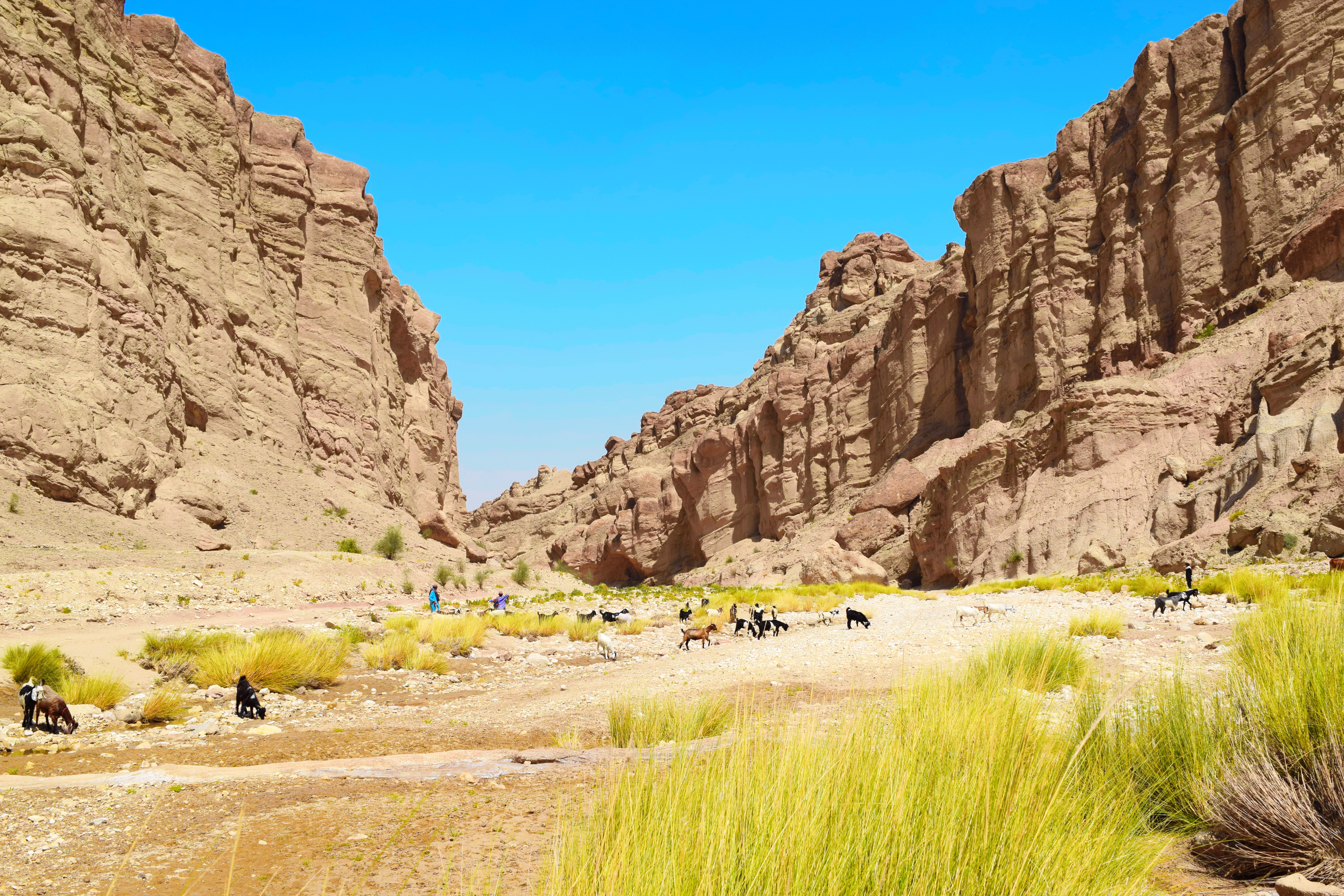
- Canyon in Dera Bugti district

- Map of Balochistan with Dera Bugti District highlighted
- Country: Pakistan
- Province: Balochistan
- Division: Sibi
- Established: July 1983
- Headquarters: Dera Bugti

Government
  - Type: District Administration
  - Deputy Commissioner: Azhar Ali
  - District Police Officer: Essa Jan Rind
  - District Health Officer: Dr. Muhammad Azam

Area
  - District of Balochistan: 10,160 km^{2} (3,920 sq mi)

Population (2023 Census of Pakistan)
  - District of Balochistan: 355,274
  - Density: 34.97/km^{2} (90.57/sq mi)
  - Urban: 108,447
  - Rural: 246,827

Literacy
  - Literacy rate: Total: (24.07%); Male: (34.40%); Female: (11.88%)
- Time zone: UTC+5 (PST)
- Number of Tehsils: 4

South Dera Bugti District is an administrative district in the Balochistan province of Pakistan.

South Dera Bugti District was bifurcated into two districts namely North Dera Bugti District and South Dera Bugti District.

It consists of Sui, Dera Bugti and Sangseelah.

== History ==
Dera Bugti (Balochi: ڈئره بگٹیءِ دمگ, Urdu: ضلع ڈیرہ بگٹی) is a district within the Balochistan province of Pakistan. It was established as a separate district in 1983. It is home to most members of the namesake Bugti tribe.

== Administration ==
The district is administratively divided into the following five tehsils (subdivisions)

Tehsil	Area (km^{2})	Pop. (2023)	Density (ppl/km^{2}) (2023)	Literacy rate (2023)	Union Councils
Dera Bugti	927	50,943	54.95	33.75%	...
Phelawagh	...	...	...	...	...
Sui	3,858	126,725	32.85		...
Baiker Tehsil	258	33,410	129.50	15.62%	...
Pirkoh	...	...	...	...	...

== Demography ==
=== Population ===
Historical population
Year	Pop.	±% p.a.
1951	...	—
1961	32,049	—
1972	52,718	+4.63%
1981	103,821	+7.82%
1998	181,310	+3.33%
2017	313,110	+2.92%
2023	355,274	+2.13%

Historical population
Year	Pop.	±% p.a.
1951	N/A	—
1961	N/A	—
1972	N/A	—
1981	N/A	—
1998	181,310	—
2017	313,110	+2.92%
2023	355,274	+2.13%

As of the 2023 census, Dera Bugti district has 62,267 households and a population of 355,274. The district has a sex ratio of 121.10 males to 100 females and a literacy rate of 24.07%: 34.40% for males and 11.88% for females. 152,457 (42.91% of the surveyed population) are under 10 years of age. 108,447 (30.52%) live in urban areas. 1,843 (0.52%) were from religious minorities, around 1,100 Hindus and 700 Christians.

=== Religion ===
Religious groups in Dera Bugti District (British Baluchistan era)
Religious group	1901		1911		1921		1931		1941	
Religious group	Pop.	%	Pop.	%	Pop.	%	Pop.	%	Pop.	%
Islam	38,507	98.94%	34,395	98.93%	36,730	99.21%	54,903	99.42%	57,831	99.52%
Hinduism	412	1.06%	371	1.07%	294	0.79%	321	0.58%	281	0.48%
Sikhism	0	0%	0	0%	0	0%	0	0%	0	0%
Christianity	0	0%	0	0%	0	0%	0	0%	0	0%
Zoroastrianism	0	0%	0	0%	0	0%	0	0%	0	0%
Judaism	0	0%	0	0%	0	0%	0	0%	0	0%
Jainism	0	0%	0	0%	0	0%	0	0%	0	0%
Buddhism	—N/a	—N/a	0	0%	0	0%	0	0%	0	0%
Tribal	—N/a	—N/a	—N/a	—N/a	—N/a	—N/a	0	0%	0	0%
Others	0	0%	0	0%	0	0%	0	0%	0	0%
Total population	38,919	100%	34,766	100%	37,024	100%	55,224	100%	58,112	100%
Note: British Baluchistan era figures are for Marri-Bugti Country, which roughly corresponds to present-day Dera Bugti District. Marri-Bugti Country formed part of Sibi District during the British Baluchistan era.

=== Language ===
At the time of the 2023 census, 98.94% of the population spoke Balochi as their first language.

=== Political Organization ===
The Bugti Youth Organization is a left-leaning youth political organization from Dera Bugti, Balochistan. Established in November 2025, it developed from the Bugti Progressive Student Society formed in 2023. The organization works on issues related to democratic representation, social welfare, and equitable resource governance in the region.

== Notable people ==
- Akbar Bugti (born 12 July 1926 in Dera Bugti; died 26 August 2006) was the Tumandar (tribal chief) of the Bugti tribe, a seasoned politician, former Governor and Chief Minister of Balochistan, and founder of the Jamhoori Wattan Party.
- Brahumdagh Bugti, born in Dera Bugti, is the founder and leader of the Baloch Republican Party, a Baloch nationalist political organisation formed following his departure from the Jamhoori Wattan Party in 2008. He campaigns for Baloch rights and has been living in self-imposed exile in Switzerland
- Shahzain Bugti (born 14 April 1970 in Dera Bugti) is a Pakistani politician who served as Member of the National Assembly from August 2018 to August 2023 and held positions including Special Assistant to the Prime Minister on Reconciliation and Harmony in Balochistan (2021–2022) and Federal Minister for Narcotics Control (2022–2023). He is the grandson of Akbar Bugti and leads the Jamhoori Wattan Party.
- Sarfraz Bugti, born in a village of Dera Bugti in Balochistan, is a Pakistani politician whose early education includes Lawrence College, Murree, and studies in Defence and Strategic Studies at Quaid-i-Azam University. His father was a tribal elder and political dissident, and Sarfraz himself has been involved in politics, including periods of arrest amid election activities.

== See also ==
- Dilbar Mat
- List of tehsils of Pakistan
  - List of tehsils of Balochistan
- List of districts of Pakistan
  - List of districts in Balochistan

== Bibliography ==
- 1998 District Census report of Dera Bugti. Census publication. Vol. 24. Islamabad: Population Census Organization, Statistics Division, Government of Pakistan. 1999.

== News and reports ==
- "بلوچستان کی مائیں اور بے بسی کی موت: زچگی کے دوران اموات میں خوفناک اضافہ", Sangat Mag, March 16, 2025. URL: (https://sangatmag.com/latest/44679)
- "ڈیرہ بگٹی، اقدامات کا فقدان، دورانِ زچگی خواتین کی شرح اموات میں "تشویشناک اضافہ, Daily Jang (E‑Paper), June 6, 2025. URL:https://e.jang.com.pk/detail/908495
- جمہوری روایات کی صبح ہم بھی دیکھیں گے (19 February 2022) URL https://jang.com.pk/news/1051958
- UrduPoint, Live News, May 31, 2025. URL: https://www.urdupoint.com/daily/livenews/2025-05-31/news-4445216.html)
- Jang Newspaper, (ڈیرہ بگٹی کے معذور افراد کو ملازمتوں سے محروم رکھا جارہا ہے،سہارا ویلفیئر/June/1/2025). URL: (https://jang.com.pk/news/1476731)
- The Pakistan Daily, "Activists from Islamabad‑Rawalpindi demand climate justice" (September 24, 2022). URL: (https://thepakistandaily.com/activists-from-islamabad-rawalpindi-demand-climate-justice/)
- Dawn, "(call-to-end-violence-against-transgender-people (April, 1, 2022)". URLs:
- (https://www.dawn.com/news/1682782) "history-the-rise-and-fall-of-the-progressive-writers-movement", March 26, 2023 (https://www.dawn.com/news/1744128)

=== Literary and cultural analyses ===
- "Progressive Writers Movement (Taraqqi Pasand Tehreek)", Rekhta. URL: (https://www.rekhta.org/urdu-resources/progressive-writers-movement-taraqqi-pasand-tehreek)
- Minute Mirror, "The Progressive Writers Association in Pakistan" (October 19, 2021). URL: (https://minutemirror.com.pk/the-progressive-writers-association-in-pakistan-6593/)

Feature Stories (The Friday Times)

- "Museum Of Lost Voices: Women Confronting Patriarchal Violence Across Pakistan", The Friday Times, (date: March 6, 2025). URL: (https://www.thefridaytimes.com/06-Mar-2025/museum-of-lost-voices-women-confronting-patriarchal-violence-across-pakistan)
- "Balochistan’s Women Are Not Just Survivors—They Are Architects Of Change", The Friday Times, (date: February 24, 2025). URL: (https://www.thefridaytimes.com/24-Feb-2025/balochistan-s-women-are-not-just-survivors-they-are-architects-of-change)
- "Tribal Patriarchy And The Rise Of Women’s Politics In Balochistan", The Friday Times, (date: February 21, 2025). URL: (https://www.thefridaytimes.com/21-Feb-2025/tribal-patriarchy-and-the-rise-of-women-s-politics-in-balochistan)
- "Balochistan’s Literary Awakening: Books, Politics And The Quest For Identity", The Friday Times, (date: February 18, 2025). URL: (https://www.thefridaytimes.com/18-Feb-2025/balochistan-s-literary-awakening-books-politics-and-the-quest-for-identity)
- "The Maternal Health Catastrophe Of Dera Bugti", The Friday Times, (date: February 15, 2025). URL: (https://www.thefridaytimes.com/15-Feb-2025/the-maternal-health-catastrophe-of-dera-bugti)
- "Broken Schools, Doubtful Futures: The State of Education In Balochistan", The Friday Times, (date: March 9, 2025). URL: (https://www.thefridaytimes.com/09-Mar-2025/broken-schools-doubtful-futures-the-state-of-education-in-balochistan)
- "85% Dropout Rate: The Shocking State Of Education In Dera Bugti", The Friday Times, (date: April 18, 2025). URL: (https://www.thefridaytimes.com/18-Apr-2025/85-percent-dropout-rate-the-shocking-state-of-education-in-dera-bugti)
- "AI Dreams Vs Dark Classrooms: Balochistan’s Cruel Education Contrast", The Friday Times, (date: April 15, 2025). URL: (https://www.thefridaytimes.com/15-Apr-2025/of-promises-and-the-reality-of-balochistan-s-education)
- "How To Understand The Enduring Legacy Of Nawab Akbar Bugti", The Friday Times, (date: April 11, 2025). URL: (https://www.thefridaytimes.com/11-Apr-2025/how-to-understand-the-enduring-legacy-of-nawab-akbar-bugti)
- "Of Water, War And Hope: Balochistan’s Fight Against Scarcity And Neglect", The Friday Times, (date: March 22, 2025). URL: (https://www.thefridaytimes.com/22-Mar-2025/of-water-war-and-hope-balochistan-s-fight-against-scarcity-and-neglect)
- "Forgotten Custodians: The Untold Story Of The Bugti Tribe", The Friday Times, (date: March 16, 2025). URL: (https://www.thefridaytimes.com/16-Mar-2025/forgotten-custodians-the-untold-story-of-the-bugti-tribe)
- "From Uch To Sui And Beyond: The Bugti Tribe’s Struggle For Resource Justice", The Friday Times, (date: May 18, 2025). URL: (https://www.thefridaytimes.com/18-May-2025/from-uch-to-sui-and-beyond-the-bugti-tribe-s-struggle-for-resource-justice)
- "They Called It Honour, We Call It Murder", The Friday Times, (date: April 28, 2025). URL: (https://www.thefridaytimes.com/28-Apr-2025/they-called-it-honour-we-call-it-murder)
- "Of Faith And Fire: Pakistan’s Escalating Crisis Of Religious Extremism", The Friday Times, (date: April 23, 2025). URL: (https://www.thefridaytimes.com/23-Apr-2025/of-faith-and-fire-pakistan-s-escalating-crisis-of-religious-extremism)

The  Guardian (SL Guardian)

- "From Daylight Robbery To Legalised Plunder: The Tale Of Sui In Balochistan—My Hometown", SL Guardian (23/april/2025). URL: (https://slguardian.org/from-daylight-robbery-to-legalised-plunder-the-tale-of-sui-in-balochistan-my-hometown/)
- "Balochistan: The Resource Curse In The Shadow Of Superpowers", SL Guardian(18/april/2025). URL: (https://slguardian.org/balochistan-the-resource-curse-in-the-shadow-of-superpowers/)
- "BYC: A Voice For Balochistan’s Future", SL Guardian (april/6/2025). URL: (https://slguardian.org/byc-a-voice-for-balochistans-future/)
- "Balochistan: A New Turf For Global Powers’ Resource Capture", The High Asia (june/27/2025). URL: (https://thehighasia.com/balochistan-a-new-turf-for-global-powers-resource-capture/)
- “Nawab Akbar Bugti Legacy Of Baloch Autonomy”, SL Guardian (april/9/2025). URL: (https://slguardian.org/nawab-akbar-bugti-legacy-of-baloch-autonomy/)
- “Will The Baloch Now Only Live To Twenty?”, SL Guardian (july/3/2025). URL: (https://slguardian.org/will-the-baloch-now-only-live-to-twenty/)
- “Balochistan—The Engineered Illusion”, SL Guardian (June/18/2025). URL: (https://slguardian.org/balochistan-the-engineered-illusion/)

 Additional Articles

- Balochistan24.com, "The Cry Of The Bugti Women: Shadows Of Death In The Land Of Resources", January 24, 2025. URL: (https://balochistan24.com/en/2025/01/24/the-cry-of-the-bugti-women-shadows-of-death-in-the-land-of-resources/)
- Balochistan24.com, "Breaking Chains: Tribal Patriarchy And The Rise Of Feminist Resistance", February 23, 2025. URL: (https://balochistan24.com/en/2025/02/23/breaking-chains-tribal-patriarchy-and-the-rise-of-feminist-resistance/)
- The Daily Tribune, (or Tribune author Abdul Ghaffar Bugti), "Balochistan’s women are not just survivors—they are architects of change" (URL: (https://tribune.com.pk/author/12884/abdul-ghaffar-bugti)
- Dawn, "There are grievances other than terrorism" (April/6/2025). URL: (https://www.dawn.com/news/1902435)
- Nayadaur Urdu, "ڈیرہ بگٹی؛ سوئی میں بسنے والی خواتین اور بچیوں کی فریاد کون سنے گا؟" (November 8, 2024). URL: (https://urdu.nayadaur.tv/08-Nov-2024/27235?version=amp)
- Shafaqna Urdu, "نیا دور نیوز رپورٹ/ڈیرہ بگٹی؛ سوئی میں بسنے والی خواتین اور بچوں کی فریاد کون سنے گا؟" (nov/8/2024). URL: (https://ur.shafaqna.com/UR/365433/)
- Humsub.com.pk, "کیا کبھی غیرت کے نام کسی سردار کی بیٹی یا بیوی کا قتل ہوا ہے؟", (July 28, 2025). URL: (https://humsub.com.pk/n/7213/2025/07/28/abdul-ghaffar-bugti/)
- "کیا غریب کی کوئی شناخت ہوتی ہے؟", (July 18, 2024) URL: (https://www.humsub.com.pk/543437/abdul-ghaffar-bugti-dera-bugti-13/)
- "جی میں بگٹی ہوں", (7/1/2024) URL: (https://www.humsub.com.pk/535769/abdul-ghaffar-bugti-dera-bugti-3/)
- "ملٹری کالج کی یادیں", (30/12/2023) URL: (https://www.humsub.com.pk/535076/abdul-ghaffar-bugti-dera-bugti/)
- "بلوچستان کے سیاستدان اور قبائلی عمائدین", (29/12/2024) URL: (https://www.humsub.com.pk/573958/abdul-ghaffar-bugti-dera-bugti-27/)
- "بلوچستان میں کتابیں پڑھنے کا رواج اور سیاسی تحریکیں", (20/2/2025) URL: (https://www.humsub.com.pk/580809/abdul-ghaffar-bugti-dera-bugti-33/)
- "قبائلی علاقوں میں عورت دشمن رسم: ایک سنگین معاملہ", (12/11/2024) URL: (https://www.humsub.com.pk/569697/abdul-ghaffar-bugti-dera-bugti-24/)
- The Friday Times, "10 Days, 7 Murders: The Alarming Math Of Gender Violence In Pakistan", July 19, 2025. URL: (https://www.thefridaytimes.com/19-Jul-2025/10-days-7-murders-the-alarming-math-of-gender-violence-in-pakistan)
- The Friday Times, "Two Narratives, One Reality: How Balochistan Is Prevented From Speaking Its Mind", June 19, 2025. URL: (https://www.thefridaytimes.com/19-Jun-2025/two-narratives-one-reality-how-balochistan-is-prevented-from-speaking-its-mind)
- Humsub.com.pk, "مون سون کی بارشیں", (July 24, 2025). URL: (https://www.humsub.com.pk/n/6475/2025/07/24/abdul-ghaffar-bugti/)
- The Friday Times, "Theatre Of The Oppressed In The City Of Rulers", August 18, 2025. URL: (https://www.thefridaytimes.com/18-Aug-2025/theatre-of-the-oppressed-in-the-city-of-rulers)
- "Aurat March: We are the ones who will dismantle class divisions", *The Public Purview*, March 6, 2025. URL: (https://thepublicpurview.com/aurat-march-we-are-the-ones-who-will-dismantle-class-divisions)
- "Aurat March: We are the ones who will dismantle class divisions", *ABC News Pakistan*, March 6, 2025. URL: (https://abc.net.pk/49576/aurat-march-we-are-the-ones-who-will-dismantle-class-divisions)
- "Aurat March: We are the ones who will dismantle class divisions", *Green Post*, March 6, 2025. URL: (https://greenpost.com.pk/aurat-march-we-are-the-ones-who-will-dismantle-class-divisions)
- "Aurat March: We are the ones who will dismantle class divisions", *Global Times Pakistan*, March 6, 2025. URL: (https://globaltimes.com.pk/index.php/2025/03/06/aurat-march-we-are-the-ones-who-will-dismantle-class-divisions)
- "Aurat March: We are the ones who will dismantle class divisions", *You Are Pakistan*, March 6, 2025. URL: (https://youarepakistan.com.pk/index.php/2025/03/06/aurat-march-we-are-the-ones-who-will-dismantle-class-divisions)
- "Aurat March: We are the ones who will dismantle class divisions", *First Time*, March 6, 2025. URL: (https://firsttime.com.pk/aurat-march-we-are-the-ones-who-will-dismantle-class-divisions)
- "Aurat March: We are the ones who will dismantle class divisions", *The Public PK*, March 6, 2025. URL: (https://thepublic.pk/aurat-march-we-are-the-ones-who-will-dismantle-class-divisions)
- "Aurat March: We are the ones who will dismantle class divisions", *Daily Times Pakistan*, March 6, 2025. URL: (https://dailytimes.net.pk/index.php/2025/03/06/aurat-march-we-are-the-ones-who-will-dismantle-class-divisions)
