= Rakhshan Division =

Administrative division of Balochistan, Pakistan

Rakhshan Division رخشان ڈویژن رخشان ولایت
- Division
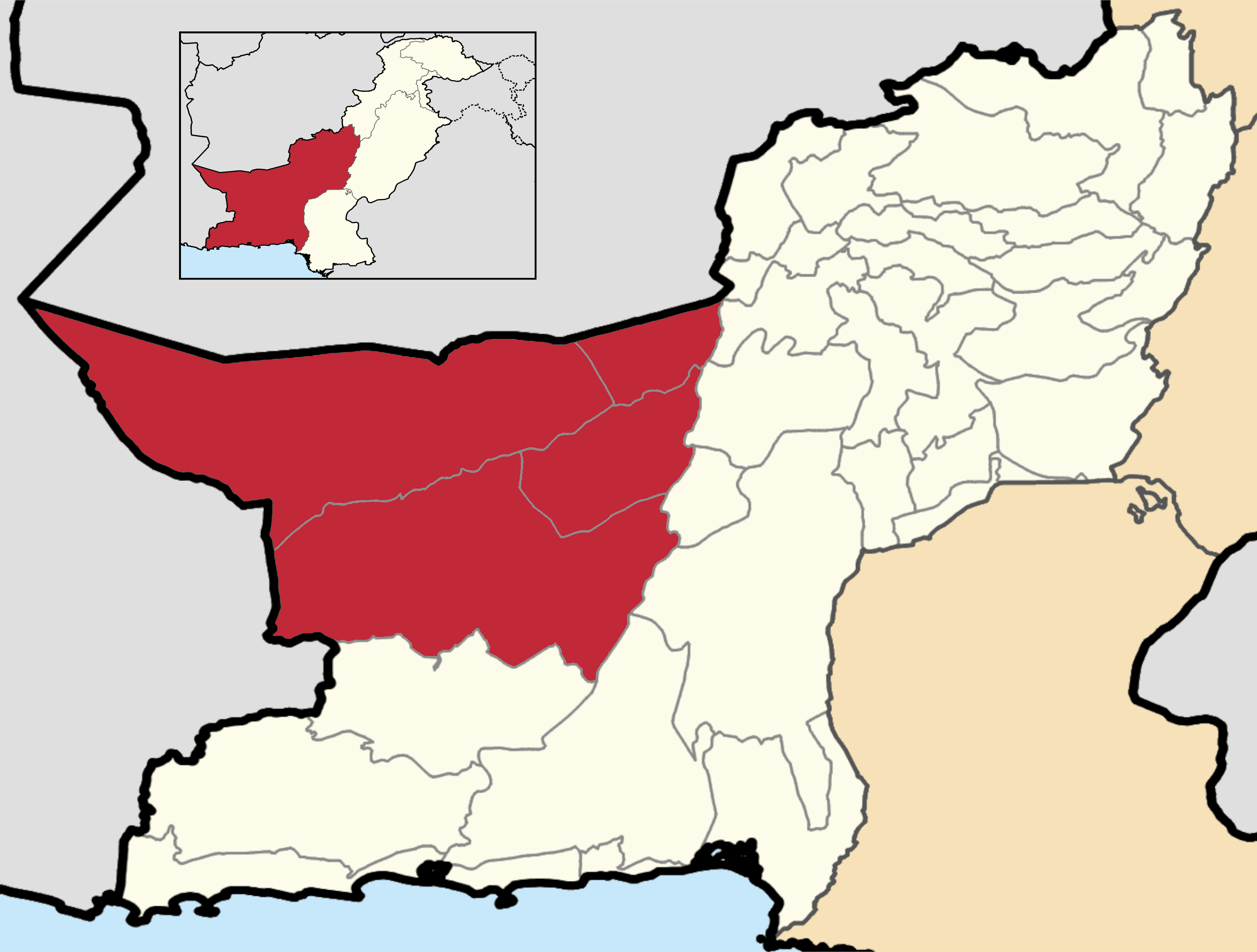
- Map of Rakhshan Division
- Country: Pakistan
- Province: Balochistan
- Capital: Kharan
- Established: 17 May 2017

Government
  - Type: Divisional Administration
  - Commissioner: N/A
  - Regional Police Officer: N/A

Area
  - Division: 98,596 km^{2} (38,068 sq mi)

Population (2023)
  - Division: 1,040,001
  - Density: 10.55/km^{2} (27.3/sq mi)
  - Urban: 190,539 (18.32%)
  - Rural: 849,462 (81.68%)

Ethnicities
  - People: Largest: Balochs (69.51%); Others: Brahvis (26.98%)

Literacy
  - Literacy rate: Total: (36.84%); Male: (45.65%); Female: (27.19%)

Rakhshan Division is an administrative division of Balochistan Province, Pakistan.

== List of the Districts ==
| # | District | Headquarter | Area (km^{2}) | Population (2023) | Density (ppl/km^{2}) (2023) | Lit. rate (2023) |
|---|---|---|---|---|---|---|
| 1 | Chagai | Dalbandin | 19,338 | 219,308 | 11.3 | 33.15% |
| 2 | Washuk | Washuk | 21,430 | 247,038 | 9.1 | 21.58% |
| 3 | Kharan | Kharan | 14,958 | 260,352 | 17.4 | 41.07% |
| 4 | Nushki | Nushki | 5,797 | 207,834 | 35.9 | 57.12% |
| 5 | Western Chagai | Nok Kundi | 37,073 | 105,469 | 2.8 | 41.07% |

== List of the Tehsils ==
| # | Tehsil | Area (km^{2}) | Population (2023) | Density (ppl/km^{2}) (2023) | Literacy rate (2023) | Districts |
|---|---|---|---|---|---|---|
| 1 | Dalbandin Tehsil | 7,791 | 122,918 | 15.78 | | Chagai |
| 2 | Chagai Tehsil | 3,975 | 73,482 | 18.49 | | Chagai |
| 3 | Amuri tehsil | | | | | Chagai |
| 4 | Chilgazi tehsil | | | | | Chagai |
| 5 | Yak Machh | 7,572 | 22,908 | 3.03 | | Chagai |
| 6 | Kharan Tehsil | 2,941 | 104,035 | 35.37 | | Kharan |
| 7 | Sar-Kharan Tehsil | 3,539 | 86,015 | 24.30 | | Kharan |
| 8 | Tohumulk Tehsil | 6,347 | 49,803 | 7.85 | | Kharan |
| 9 | Patkain Tehsil | 2,131 | 20,499 | 9.62 | | Kharan |
| 10 | Nushki Tehsil | 3,731 | 190,905 | 51.17 | | Nushki |
| 11 | Dak Tehsil | 2,066 | 16,929 | 8.19 | | Nushki |
| 12 | Mashkel Tehsil | 11,663 | 67,142 | 5.76 | | Western Chagai |
| 13 | Nok Kundi Tehsil | 16,092 | 30,625 | 1.90 | | Western Chagai |
| 14 | Taftan Tehsil | 9,318 | 19,259 | 2.07 | | Western Chagai |
| 15 | Besima Tehsil | 6,014 | 63,368 | 10.54 | | Washuk |
| 16 | Washuk Tehsil | 7,494 | 55,585 | 7.42 | | Washuk |
| 17 | Nag Tehsil | 4,338 | 57,467 | 13.25 | | Washuk |
| 18 | Shahgori Tehsil | 3,584 | 59,061 | 16.48 | | Washuk |

== Constituencies ==
| # | District | Provincial Assembly Constituency | National Assembly Constituency |
|---|---|---|---|
| 1 | Washuk | PB-31 Washuk | NA-260 Chagai-cum-Nushki-cum-Kharan-cum-Washuk |
| 2 | Chagai | PB-32 Chagai | NA-260 Chagai-cum-Nushki-cum-Kharan-cum-Washuk |
| 3 | Kharan | PB-33 Kharan | NA-260 Chagai-cum-Nushki-cum-Kharan-cum-Washuk |
| 4 | Nushki | PB-34 Nushki | NA-260 Chagai-cum-Nushki-cum-Kharan-cum-Washuk |

== Demographics ==
=== Population ===
Historical population
| Year | Pop. | ±% p.a. |
|---|---|---|
| 1951 | ... | — |
| 1961 | ... | — |
| 1972 | ... | — |
| 1981 | ... | — |
| 1998 | 409,473 | — |
| 2017 | 737,162 | +3.14% |
| 2023 | 1,040,001 | +5.90% |

According to 2023 census, Rakhshan Division had a population of 1,040,001, roughly equal to the country of Djibouti or the US state of Delaware.

== See also ==
- Districts of Pakistan
  - Districts of Balochistan
- Tehsils of Pakistan
  - Tehsils of Balochistan
- Divisions of Pakistan
  - Divisions of Balochistan
  - Divisions of Khyber Pakhtunkhwa
  - Divisions of Punjab
  - Divisions of Sindh
  - Divisions of Azad Kashmir
  - Divisions of Gilgit-Baltistan
