= Basima Tehsil =

Town in Baluchistan, Pakistan

Basima Besima
- Town / Tehsil
- Location within Balochistan, Pakistan Location within Pakistan
- Coordinates: 27°54′32″N 65°52′25″E
- Country: Pakistan
- Province: Balochistan
- District: Washuk District
- Elevation: 1,076 m (3,530 ft)
- Time zone: UTC+5 (PST)

Basima is a town and tehsil in Washuk District of Balochistan, Pakistan. It lies on the N-85 and N-30 National Highway. The cruise missiles fired off from Arabian sea during the 1998 US strike on Afghanistan were seen flying over this town by local people and one of the unexploded cruise missiles was found 65 kilometres (40 miles) from the town.

== See also ==
- Washuk
- Mashkel
- Kalgali
