= Western Chagai District =

Western Chagai District ضلع چاغی مغربی
- District of Balochistan
- Country: Pakistan
- Province: Balochistan
- Division: Rakshan
- Established: 28 Oct 2026
- Headquarters: Nok Kundi

Government
  - Type: District Administration
  - Deputy Commissioner: N/A
  - District Health Officer: N/A

Area
  - Total: 37,073 km^{2} (14,314 sq mi)

Population (2023)
  - Total: 117,026
  - Density: 3/km^{2} (7.8/sq mi)

Languages
  - Main language(s): Balochi,Brahui language, Urdu & English

Literacy
- Time zone: UTC+5 (PST)

Western Chagai District (ur: ضلع چاغی مغربی) is an administrative district in Balochistan which includes Taftan, Nokundi (as a capital) and Mashkhel (formerly part of Washuk District) tehsils. It was formed by Government of Balochistan vide official notification dated 28–10–2026.

== Administration ==
As per the Govt notification following changes were made for creation of Western Chagai District.

Western Chagai District
Name of Tehsils	Area(Km2)	Population	Density	Literacy Rate
Taftan Tehsil	9,318	19,259		
Nok Kundi Tehsil	16,092	30,625		
Mashkel Tehsil	11,663	67,142		

== See also ==
- List of districts in Balochistan
- Divisions of Balochistan
- Chagai
