= Hajib Shakarbar =

Shaheed Syed Ahmad Hajib Shakarbar (Zinda Pir)
- Born: 1213; Sabzwar, Iran
- Died: 1303 (aged 89–90); Narhar Sharif
- Other name: Alauddin Muhammad

Hajib Shakarbar was born as the younger of the two sons of Shams Tabrizi and Shams Sabzwari in 1213 AC. His grand parents named him Alauddin Muhammad, but when his father returned from Tabriz to see his newborn baby, he changed the name from Alauddin Muhammad to Syed Ahmad because he had a dream to this effect in Tabriz. The new baby showed the signs of a born Hafiz and so came to be known as Zinda Pir from his very infancy. He got the title of Shakarbar in Sabzwar and of Hajib in Makkah, and became so famous with the sweet combination of Hajib Shakarbar that his original names went into total oblivion. He joined his father in Multan, Pakistan, with his elder brother Naseeruddin, and a large armed escort of Turkish, Iraqi and Kabul fighters in 1289 AC.

In early 1302 he arrived with his faithful soldiers in Narhar on a preaching mission, where a fighting was imposed on him by the then Raja of Narhar, which the Hajibi army won. Three nights later, however, the defeated Raja, who had fled to Sambar, staged a late night surprise raid and killed Hajib Shakarbar who was offering his late night prayers. The Hajibi forces eventually won, killed the Raja and renamed the town as Narhar Sharif. The Grand Dargah Complex was built by a passing Hindu tradesman, who was impressed by the downpour of sugary white granules on and around the great Saint's grave in the year 1445. He later converted to Islam, memorised the Quran and became the first ever Imam of the Dargah's new built mosque.

== Lineage and background ==
Syed Ahmad Hajib Shakarbaar's lineage goes up to Imam Muhammad Ja'far al-Sadiq through his elder son Imam Muhammad Isma'il ibn Jafar.

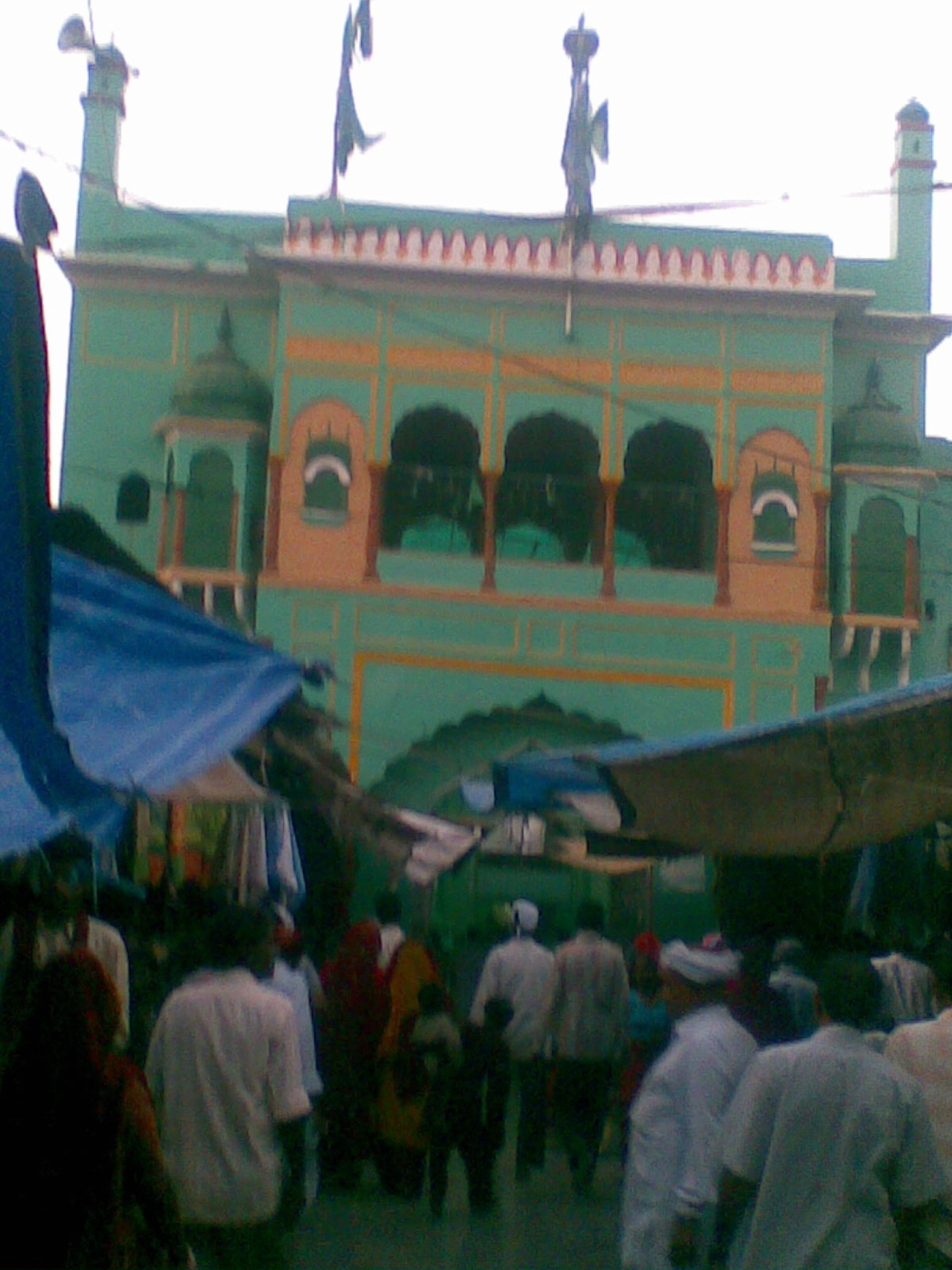
Main Gate (The three story 'Buland Darwaza')

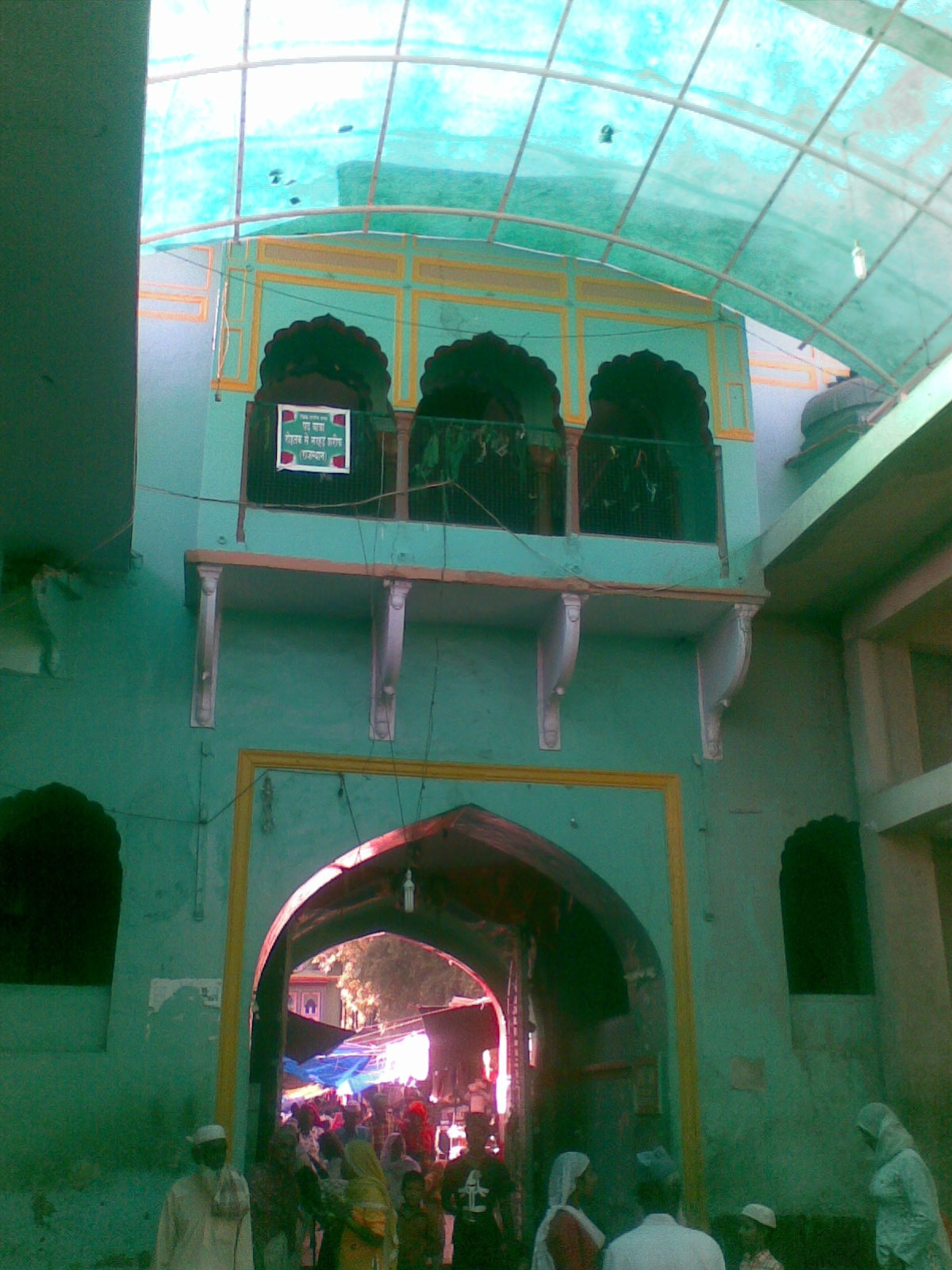
The Main Entrance as seen from inside

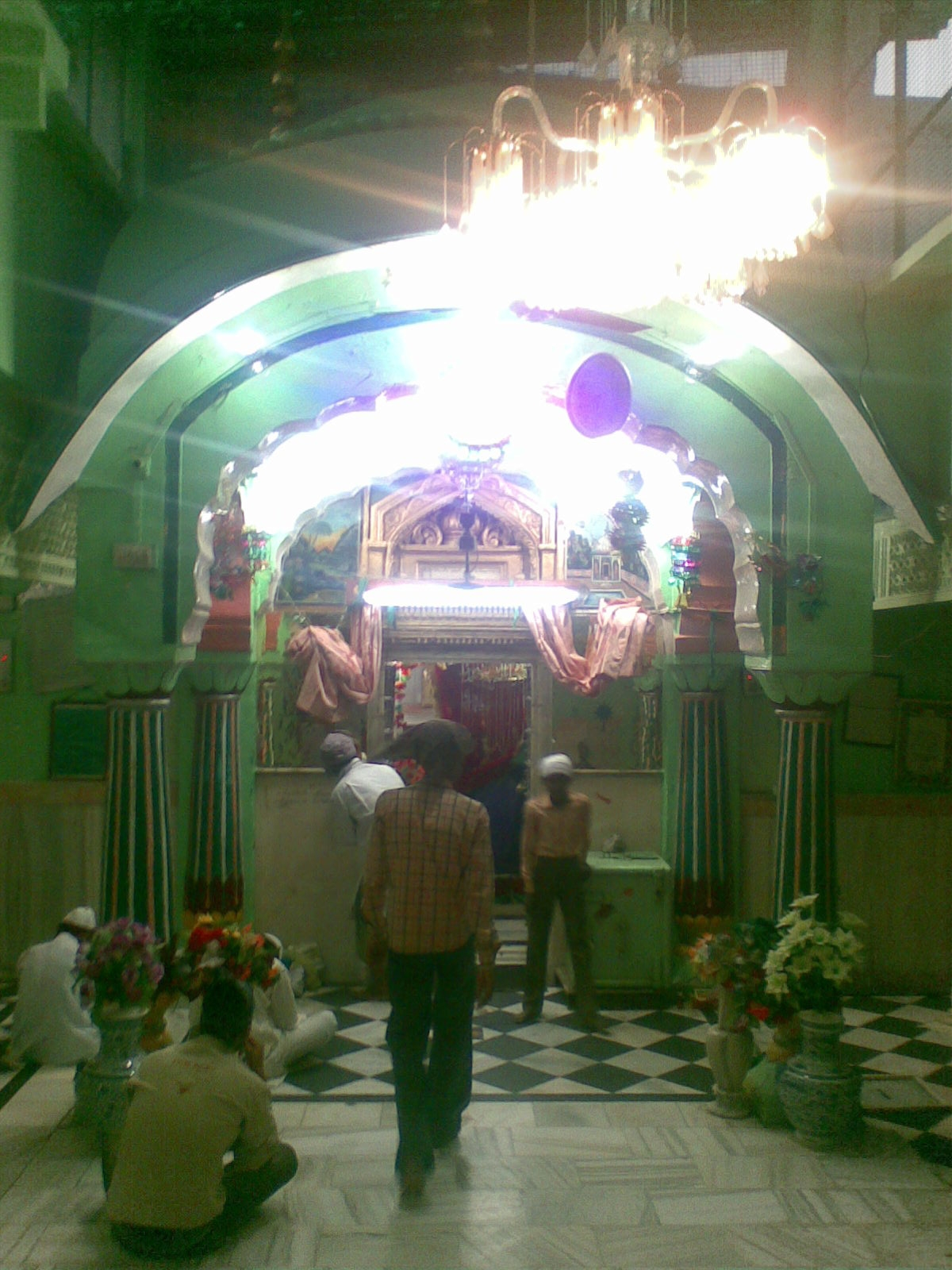
Mazar Chamber as seen through the Moghul style Diwan-e-khaas Pavilion

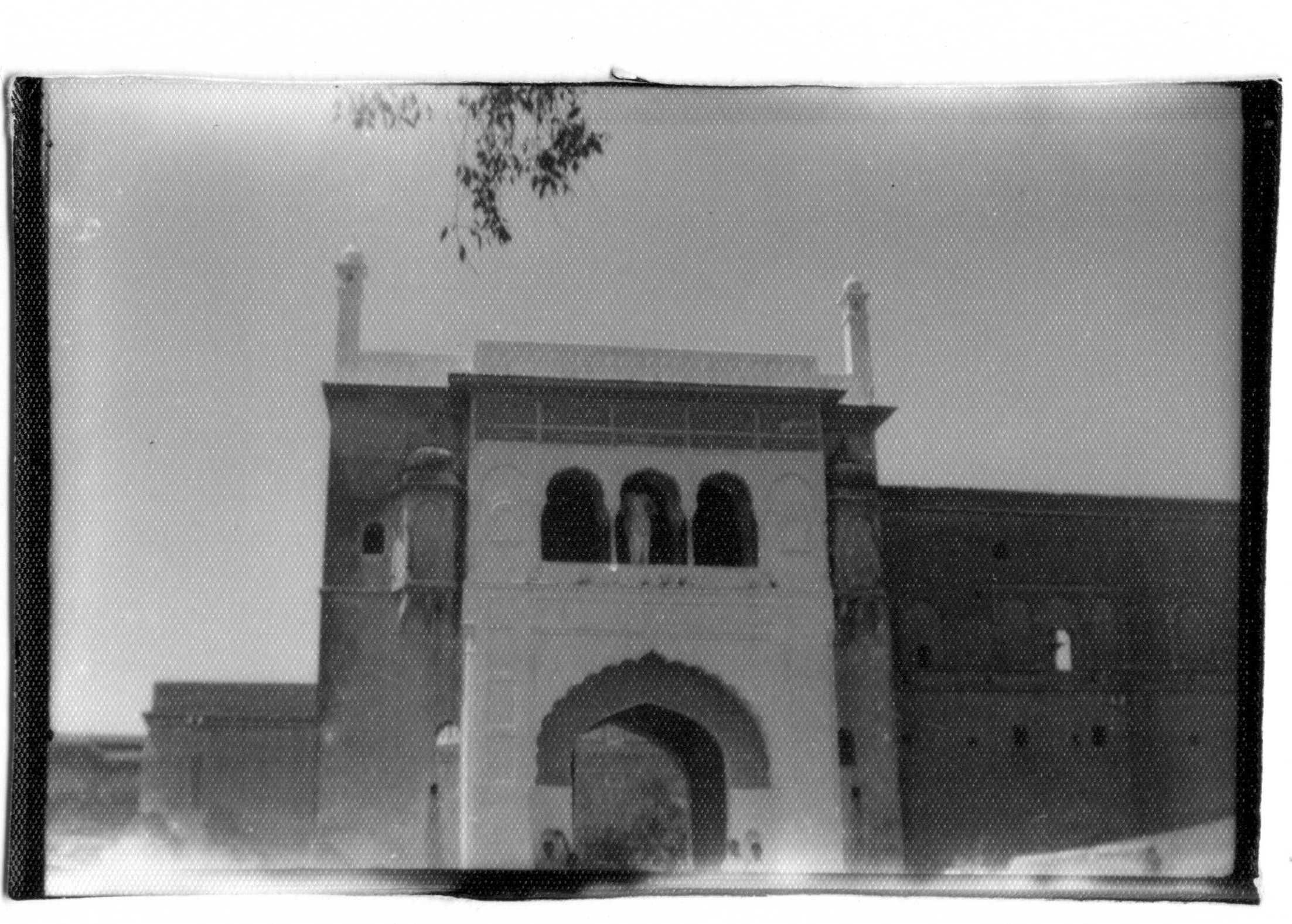
Buland Darwaza in 1446

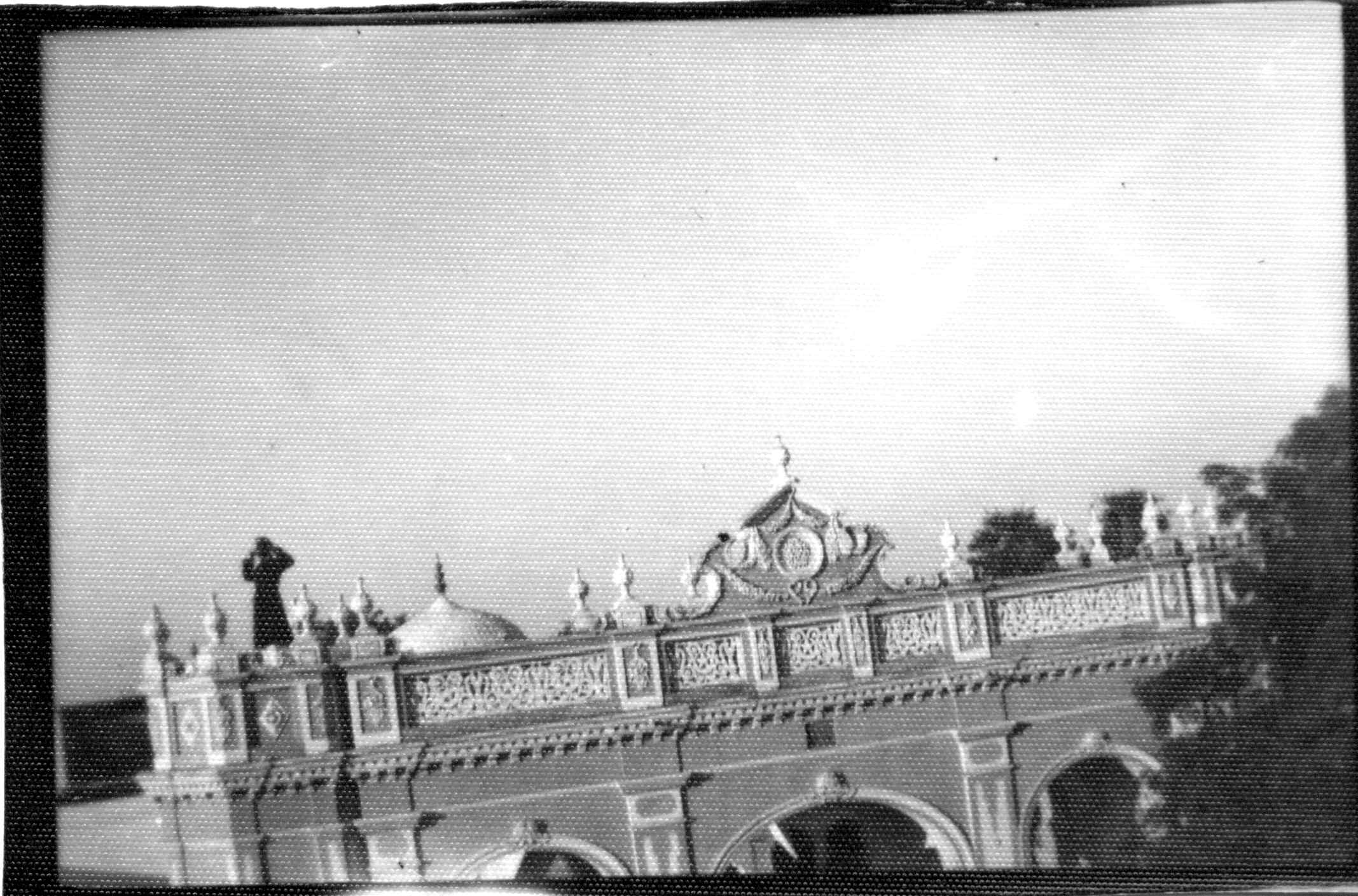
Basanti Gate, part of the famous white dome can be seen

Hajib Shakarbar Shrine

== Early life ==
=== Birth and names ===
He was born in the year 1213 AC (590 Hijri).

=== Titles ===
When he was 14, he earned the title of Shakarbar (one who cause a rain of sugar or, one for whom sugar is rained), because he had caused such a downpour by praying to Allah in favour of a poor old woman near Sabzwar in 1227.

== Journey to Multan ==
When his father Shams Sabzwari, more popularly known as Shams Tabrizi, settled in Multan in 1288, he called his wife and the families of his two sons to Multan for settlement there, advising them to go to Konya first to condole Jalaluddin Rumi’s eldest son Shaikh Bahauddin Muhammad Sultan Walad for the demise of his father, and then to Baghdad to thank King Nikodar (see Nausherwani tombs) for whatever he did for their own father when he was in Baghdad.

=== Visit to Konya ===
Shams's core and extended families decided to visit Konya first in Turkey and then Baghdad on their way to Multan city.

=== Visit to Baghdad ===
From Konya, the heavily escorted family procession proceeded to Baghdad where too they were received by King Nikodar (see Nausherwani tombs) outside the city who kept them in his palaces as guests of honour for three days.

=== Arrival in Multan ===
In Multan too, they were met by a large group of notable citizens led by Shams, Baha-ud-din Zakariya, Sadruddin Arif (see Baha-ud-din Zakariya) and other leading Sufi Sheikhs. Shams's family members were taken to his residential quarters in the city, while the large accompanying lashkar that had further swelled on the way by experienced fighters joining voluntarily from Gardez, Gazni, Zabul and Kabul, was camped outside the city, where the present railway station stands today.

=== Teaching and preaching undertaken ===
When Hajib Shakarbar wanted the members of his armed lashkar sent back to their countries of origin, his father Shams forbade him doing so, telling him that he would need them to be with him while on a preaching mission in a difficult area soon. Submitting to the advice of his father, Hajib Shakarbar started to engage in preaching missions in the surrounding areas, as well as teaching in various madrasas in Multan, and in particular, lecturing at the Darul Ulum in nearby Uch established by his elder brother and run by his nephews.

== The last family meeting ==
Towards the end of the year 1297 the aging and ailing Head of the family, Shams Sabzwari popularly known as Shams Tabrez gathered the male members of his extended household together to speak his last wishes to them. Amongst other advice, he prescribed areas of d’awa missions for his sons, grand and greatgrandchildren. Hajib Shakarbar got the area then called Baagar (hard r), referring in particular to the state of Narhar in the Rajasthan province. The ruling Raja there was known to be a notoriously anti Islam person. In the same historic meeting, Hajib Shakarbar's ten-year-old son, Syed Shamsuddin Saani (Shmsuddin II), was assigned the area around the city of Allahabad in the then Upper Province (U.P) of India, now named as Uttar Pradesh.

== Death of Shams Sabzwari ==
Soon after the last family meeting, the health of Shams began to deteriorate and his family had to confine him to his bed for resting. Later in the same year, 1298 (675 Hijri), he died aged 115 years, to widespread mourning. The news also reached Baghdad, Konya, Tabriz and sabzwar district where official mourning periods were declared.

== Supervising the construction of father's tomb ==
Hajib Shakarbar and his eldest grand nephew Pir Sadruddin joined hands to start the construction of a befitting tomb on the grave of their departed elder buried on a high ground near Multan’s famous garden known as the Aam Khas Baagh. Soon prince Nikobakht of Baghdad came in with some financial support and a grand mausoleum was completed in two years time in 1300 AC. About some four centuries later, the then ruler of Multan Mir Safdar Ali ordered a reconstruction of the mausoleum. The reconstruction of the new extended mausoleum started in 1814 and was completed in 1817 AC.

== Undertaking the assigned Dawa mission ==
=== Departure for Nahar (Narhar) ===
Hajib Shakarbar informed the Chaudhari of Jhajjar of his preaching assignment given to him by his late father. The Chaudhari was a Muslim friendly person and most of his cabinet was made up of Muslim ministers, some of whom knew and liked Shams Tabrizi of Multan. The Chaudhari sent a letter of consent that he would host only half of his armed lashkar proposing at the same time that the other half may well be hosted by the neighbouring Nawwab of Farrukhnagar on Jhajjar’s request. Shakarbar arrived in Jhajjar with his army and after a few days travelled to Farrukhnagar with his twelve-year-old son plus half of his army, as the Nawwab had agreed to host. From Farrukhnagar Shakarbar took his son to Allahabad city where he was admitted in a madrasa run by a Sheikh known to the Shams family. After staying with his son in Allahabad for some time, Hajib Shakaber returned to Farrukhnagar, where the Nawwab treated him as a royal guest for four days and then personally escorted him and his army to Jhajjar. In Jhajjar Shakarbar mentioned to them that his first area of d’awa mission was the state of Narhar. Both the Chaudhari and the Nawwab opposed his idea on grounds that Raja Sripal Singh of Narhar is a very uncompromising man and would not permit him to work in that state, especially so if he went there with the size of an armed force that he had with him. However, Hajib Shakarbar insisted to go, saying "Allah will be with us".

=== Arrival in Narhar and hostile reaction of Raja Sripal ===
Just before entering the city of Narhar, which the Nehra Jat Ruler had renamed first as Nahar, then as Srinagar and finally as Sripalnagar, Hajib Shakarbar split his armed Lashkar in three parts. He returned the first part to Jhajjar to tell the Chaudhari that all was well so far, and to start da’wa work there; ordered the second part to hide in the thick forest just on the outskirts of Narhar, while entered the city with Moulana Qamruddin Kabuli as his deputy commander leading the last third portion of his lashkar.

=== Fighting imposed ===
Camping in an open field, about a mile from the Raja’s Palaces and army headquarters, he sent Moulana Qamruddin Kabuli as an emissary to the Raja to seek permission for peaceful d’awa work in his state. The Moulana came back with a 24-hour ultimatum to leave the state. However, the Raja’s soldiers did not wait for the 24 hours to pass and killed three Hajibi soldiers for which Shakarbar demanded ‘blood money‘ from the Raja before considering a withdrawal. The demand was responded by a full blooded attack, and a battle ensued. The Naharian fighters had no experience of facing foreign troops like Hajib Shakarbar had. In addition, the Hajibi soldiers hidden in the adjoining forest soon gave a decisive surprise and the Raja fled away leaving many of his soldiers dead and captured. The victorious forces declared a general amnesty and gave back the city its original name of Narhar.

=== The Treacherous Night Raid and the Martyrdoms ===
Sripal, with some of his officers fled to Sambar, where his brother-in-law was a powerful Raja. For two days a night raid was planned to retake Narhar from the ‘invading’ forces. The treacherous night raid was executed with a planned suddenness that inflicted heavy losses on the unprepared Hajibi lashkar. Hajib Shakarbar was martyred while praying his Tahajjudvery late night/early morning voluntary prayers) and a number of his commanders got martyred while rushing in a disarray to save their leader. Commander Moulana Qamar Kabuli fell only about 200 yards from the spot of his leader's martyrdom, while Commander Mardaan Ghayb Shah fell in a 60 feet deep ditch some 1500 yards from the spot and was martyred by Sripal's raiding soldiers in that ditch. However, within the hour the Hajibi forces were able to get to their arms and regroup. Some fast horsemen rushed to Jhajjar to inform the commanders stationed there and by the next afternoon all was over for Sripal. The Raja of sambar fled seeing his brother-in-law slain and Narhar was, again, in the hands of the Hajibi lashkar, this time for good. Thus, in late 1302 AC Sripalnagar was permanently renamed as Narhar Sharif. All the Shaheeds were buried at the spots where they fell martyred and soon an amnesty was granted to the defeated Naharians of all faiths.

== Shakarbari Feat starts ==
=== A Free For All Hospital ===
Because Hajib Shakarbar was a known spiritual mystic from a very early age, and because he died for the sake of God as a Shaheed, anecdotes associated with him are in thousands. The list of his very frequent interactions with my own father is very long, which I have described in my two books mentioned above. Here, I shall only describe what I saw from age five till fourteen, that is, when we had to leave Narhar Sharif due to migration to Pakistan; and what I write may be verified from hundreds of my relatives and town mates in Hyderabad Sindh as well as from hundreds of Narhari Turks living in Moro Sindh. I clearly remember one occasion of sugar falling on the great Dargah all day one day when I was about seven. Besides, I saw the huge Dargah filled with families starting to come with their multifarious wishes, needs and ailments on every Wednesday afternoon to fill the residential halls by Thursday noon; and people returning happy and cured after Friday Prayers. This weekly routine, I hear is still on today, with the number of visitors very much increased. The Hajibi Dargah is a free for all hospital, free of cost and without any discrimination of faith, caste, creed or colour. People from near and far come with all sorts of visible and invisible ailments, rub the sand of the Dargah on their bodies and eat it as well. They put the soot collected from the oil lamp, that is lit all night in the mazar chamber, for their sight defects and eyes ailments. The sight that most fascinated boys of my age group was that families brought their dear ones that had gone insane, some of them so mad that they had to be kept in strong chains tied to the historical Imli tree just a few yards away from the Buland Darwaza. Such families had to spend two to six weeks in the Dargah rubbing sand all over the mentally ill person. Invariably, all of them went back from Narhar as normal persons.
