= Kharan (princely state) =

Princely state of British India and Pakistan

State of Kharan Balochi: ریاست خاران
- Princely State of Dominion of Pakistan
- 1697–1955
- Flag

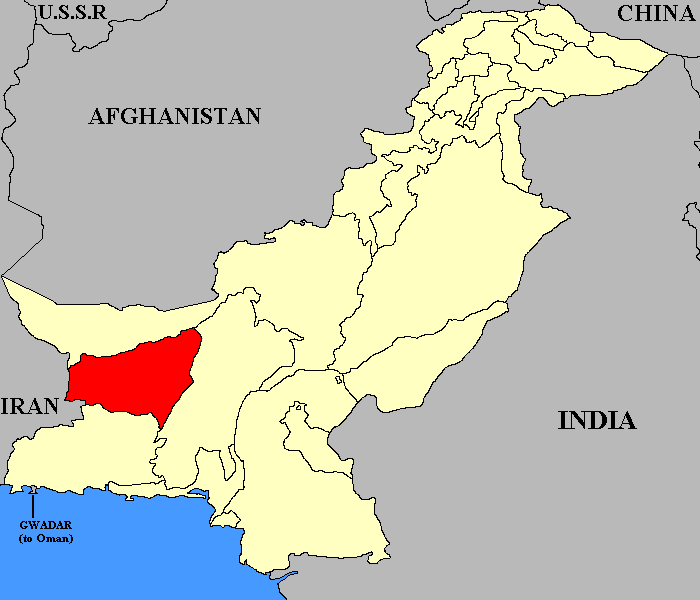
- Kharan in Pakistan 1955 (in red)
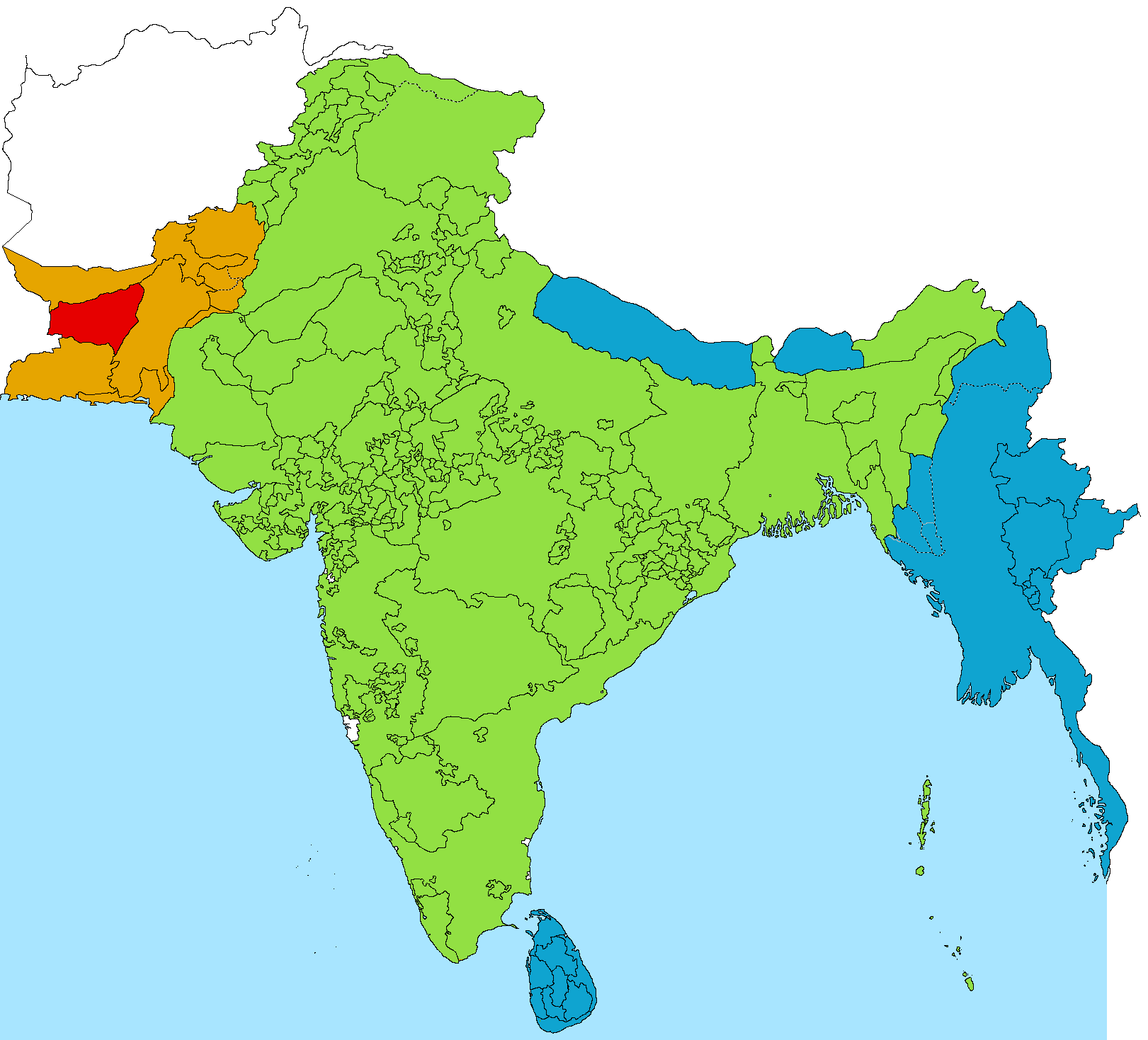
- Kharan in British India 1940 (in red)
- Capital: Kharan
- Area
  - 1697: 48,051 km^{2} (18,553 sq mi)
- Legislature
  - Upper house: Nausherwani Family
- History
  - Established: 1697
  - Disestablished: 14 October 1955
Preceded by	Succeeded by
State of Kharan	West Pakistan
- Today part of: Balochistan, Pakistan
- Government of Balochistan

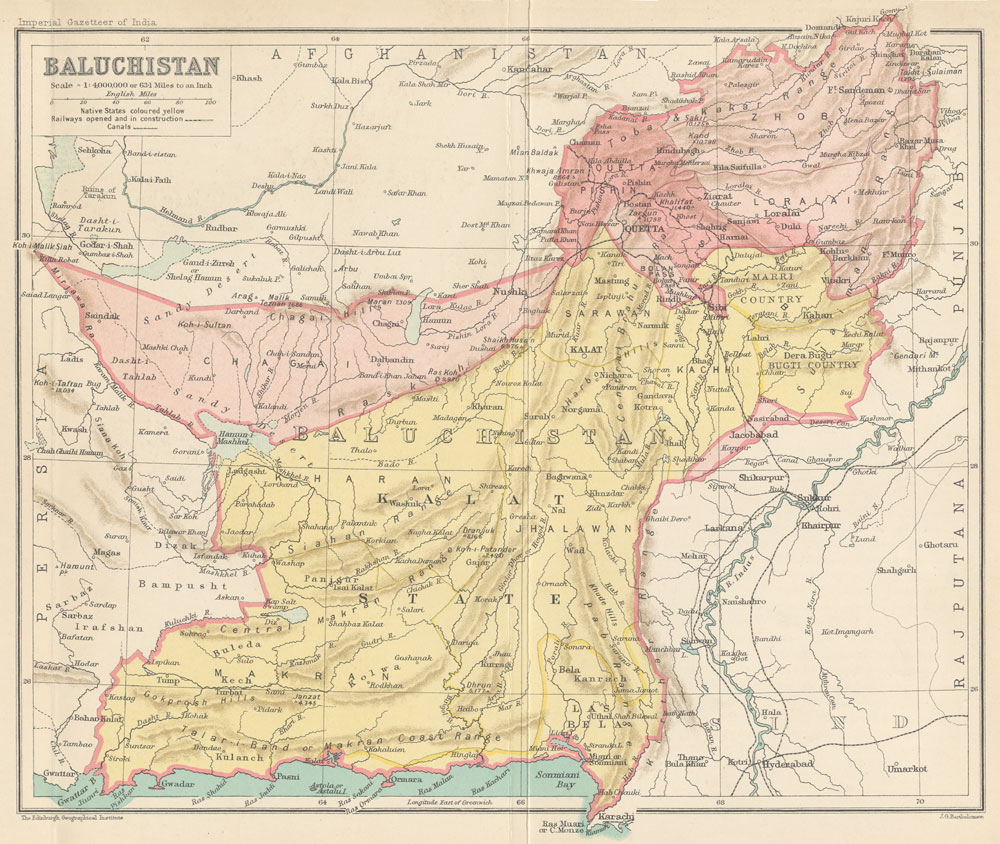
Map of the Baluchistan Agency.

The State of Kharan (Urdu: ریاست خاران) was an autonomous princely state in subsidiary alliance with British Raj, covering what is part of the present-day province of Balochistan, in the southwest of Pakistan. Makran was located to its south.

On 17 March 1948, Kharan acceded to Pakistan and on 3 October 1952 it joined the Baluchistan States Union. The state was dissolved on 14 October 1955 when most regions of the western wing of Pakistan were merged to form the province of West Pakistan. With the dissolution of the province in 1970, the territory was reorganised as Kharan District of the province of Baluchistan (later Balochistan).

== History ==
The Khanate of Kalat allied with Nader Shah of Afsharid Iran and conquered multiple states, including Kharan, in the 18th century.

The border between Kharan and Jhalawan was still disputed as of the 1940s.

Kharan was one of the ten princely states in Pakistan following the partition of India in 1947. Ahmad of Kalat attempted to maintain the independence of Kalat, but Muhammad Ali Jinnah undermined this by having Kalat's subsidiary states, including Kharan, join Pakistan. Mir Mohammad Habibullah Khan, who had a tense relationship with Ahmad of Kalat, joined Pakistan on 17 March 1948, and accused Kalat of arming "mischief-mongers" to create disorder.

In 1952, Kharan, Kalat, Lasbela, and Makran was merged into the Baluchistan States Union.

== Demographics ==
Kharan had a population of 33,822, with 99.7% being Muslims, in 1941. The Balochi language was spoken in Kharan.

== List of khans of Kharan ==
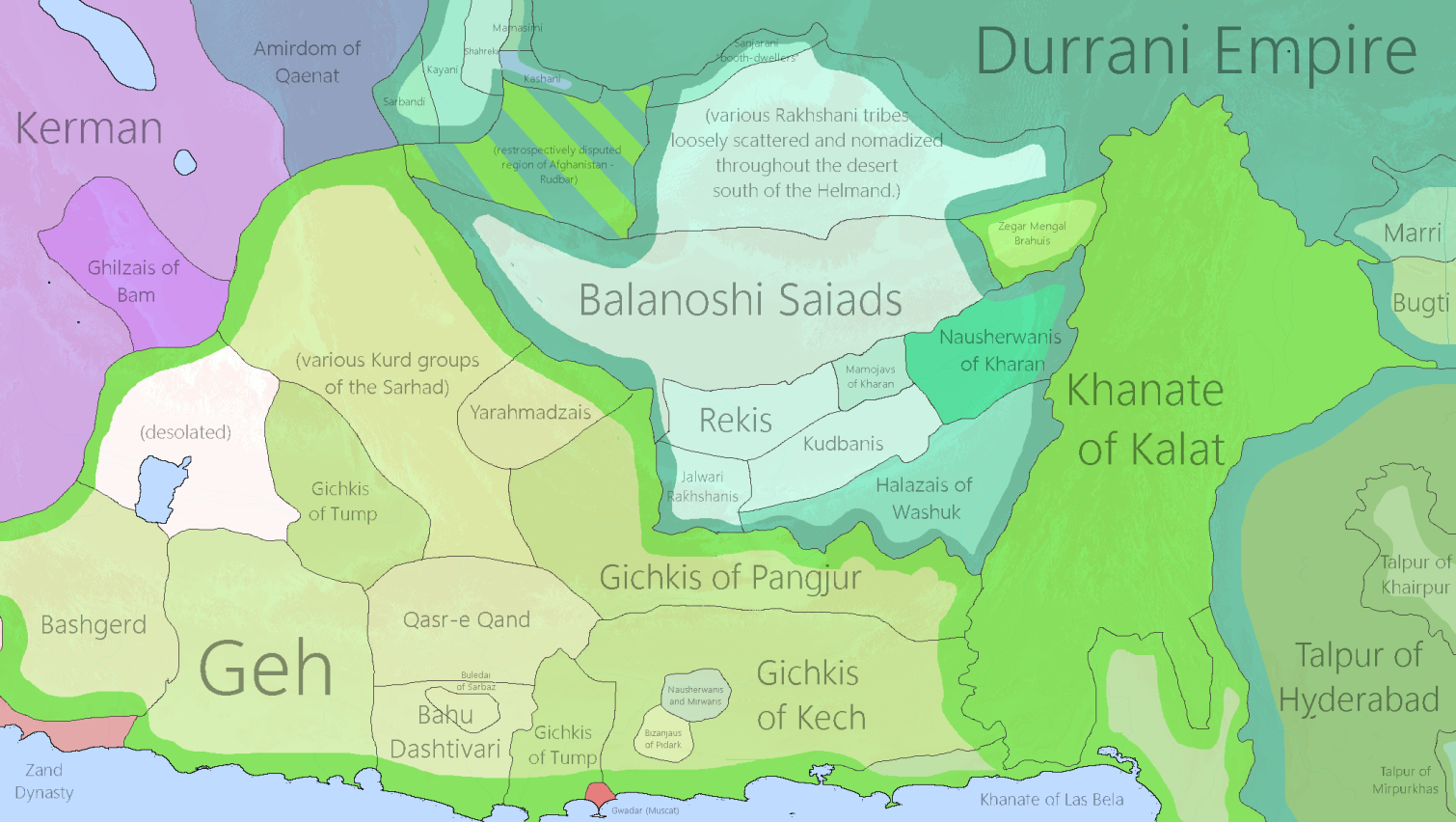
Nausherwani dominion of Kharan under the Khanate of Kalat in 1789.

Khans of Kharan	Tenure
Dinar Khan	
Shahdad Khan I	
Rahmat Khan	
Purdil Khan	1712–1747
Abbas Khan II	1747–1749
Shahdad Khan II	1749–1760
Jahangir Khan	1796–1810
Abbas Khan III	1810–1833
Azad Khan	1833–1885
Nowroz Khan	1885–1908
Mohammad Yaqub Khan	1908–1912
Habibullah Khan	1912–1955

== See also ==
- Kharan District
- Nausherwani tombs
- Baluchistan (Chief Commissioner's Province)
- Makran
- Las Bela
- Khanate of Kalat

== Works cited ==
=== Books ===
- Akins, Harrison (2023). Conquering the maharajas: India’s princely states and the end of empire, 1930–50. Manchester University Press. ISBN 9781526167859.
- Behera, Navnita (2006). Demystifying Kashmir. Brookings Institution. ISBN 9780815708605.
- Snedden, Christopher (2021). Independent Kashmir: An incomplete aspiration. Manchester University Press. ISBN 9781526156143.

=== Journals ===
- Chawla, Muhammad (2014). "Mountbatten and Balochistan: An Appraisal". Proceedings of the Indian History Congress. 75. Indian History Congress: 928–957. doi:10.2307/44158478. JSTOR 44158478.
- Copland, Ian (1991). "The Princely States, the Muslim League, and the Partition of India in 1947". The International History Review. 13 (1). Taylor & Francis: 38–69. doi:10.2307/40106322. JSTOR 40106322.
- Titus, Paul; Swidler, Nina (2000). "Knights, Not Pawns: Ethno-Nationalism and Regional Dynamics in Post-Colonial Balochistan". International Journal of Middle East Studies. 32 (1). Cambridge University Press: 47–69. doi:10.2307/259535. JSTOR 259535.
