= Sadiq Sanjrani =

8th Speaker of the Senate of Pakistan

- صادق سنجرانی
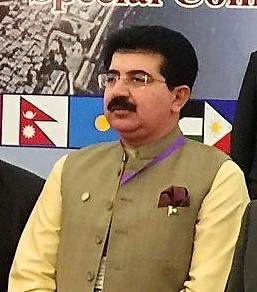
- Sanjrani in 2018

Member Provincial Assembly of Balochistan
- Incumbent
- Assumed office 9 March 2024
- Constituency: PB-31 Chagai

8th Chairman of the Senate of Pakistan
- In office 12 March 2018 – 15 February 2024
- President: Arif Alvi
- Prime Minister: Imran Khan (until 10 April 2022); Shehbaz Sharif (since 11 April 2022)
- Preceded by: Raza Rabbani
- Succeeded by: Yusuf Raza Gilani

Member of the Senate of Pakistan
- In office 12 March 2018 – 15 February 2024
- Constituency: General seat from Balochistan, Pakistan

Acting President of Pakistan
- In office 25 June 2023 – 5 July 2023

Personal details
- Born: 14 April 1978 (age 48) Nok Kundi, Balochistan, Pakistan
- Party: BAP (2018–present)
- Other political affiliations: PMLN (2013–2018); PPP (2008–2013); PML(Q) (2001–2008); PMLN (1997–1999)
- Education: University of Balochistan

Mir Muhammad Sadiq Khan Sanjrani (Note: Urdu: میر محمد صادق خان سنجرانی) (born 14 April 1970) is a Pakistani politician who was formerly the chairman of the Senate of Pakistan. He took his oath of office as a member and chairman of the Senate of Pakistan on 12 March 2018 and served until 15 February 2024.

He is the first-ever chairman of the Senate who hailed from the province of Balochistan. He belongs to the poor conservative Sanjrani tribe. From June 2023 to July 2023, he served as the acting president of Pakistan.

Currently Sanjrani is Serving as Member of Provincial Assembly of Balochistan, from PB-31 Chagai

== Early life and education ==
Sadiq Sanjrani was born on 14 April 1978 in Nok Kundi, Balochistan, to a Baloch family belonging to the well-educated Sanjrani tribe.

He received his early education from Nok Kundi and then moved to Quetta and later Islamabad where he did his degree.

== Political career ==
Sanjrani began his political career in 1998 as coordinator of the team of then Prime Minister Nawaz Sharif where he served until the 1999 Pakistani coup d'état.

In 2008, he was made in-charge of the Prime Minister's Yusuf Raza Gilani Grievance Cell at the Prime Minister's Secretariat where he remained for five years.

Sanjrani was elected to the Senate of Pakistan as an independent candidate on a general seat from Balochistan in the 2018 Pakistani Senate election. He took his oath as senator on 12 March 2018. On the same day, he was elected as the 8th chairman of the Senate of Pakistan. He received 57 votes out of a total 103 votes cast and defeated Raja Zafar ul Haq, a candidate of the Pakistan Muslim League (N) who obtained 46 votes. Sanjrani was voted into the chairmanship by the Pakistan Peoples Party, Muttahida Qaumi Movement, Pakistan Tehreek-e-Insaf, and independent senators from Balochistan and the Federally Administered Tribal Areas. He became the first ever Chairman of the Senate who hailed from the province of Balochistan and became the youngest-ever Chairman of the Senate at the age of 39. He was a relatively lesser-known figure in Pakistan's political spectrum prior to being elected as Chairman of the Senate.

In September 2018, Sanjrani addressed the National Assembly of Azerbaijan on the eve of its 100th anniversary.

On 1 August 2019, a no-confidence motion was presented by the opposition parties in the senate to remove him from the post of the chairman of the Senate. The resolution was tabled in the Senate with 64 senators in support of it. The no-confidence motion failed to pass because the opposition parties only gathered 50 votes, 3 votes short of the resolution passing. Sanjrani still stands as the chairman of the Senate of Pakistan after having survived the no-confidence vote. This was seen as a clear victory of the PTI government coalition and a confirmation of the senators having confidence in the chairman. Opposition parties claimed that Director-General of Inter-Services Intelligence, General Faiz Hameed played a key role in securing Sanjrani's victory.

In 2019, Sadiq Sanjrani became the first President of the International Parliamentarians Congress (IPC), an international platform aimed at fostering collaboration among global parliamentarians. Under his leadership, the IPC hosted various significant events and launched its permanent headquarters in Islamabad. The IPC focuses on global parliamentary cooperation to address key issues such as peace, security, and human rights.

On 12 March 2021, he was re-elected as chairman of the Senate of Pakistan, defeating his rival Yusuf Raza Gilani.

== Notes ==
Senate of Pakistan
Preceded by Raza Rabbani	Chairman of the Senate of Pakistan; 2018–2024	Succeeded by Yusuf Raza Gilani
