= 1303 =

1303 in various calendars
- Gregorian calendar: 1303; MCCCIII
- Ab urbe condita: 2056
- Armenian calendar: 752; ԹՎ ՉԾԲ
- Assyrian calendar: 6053
- Balinese saka calendar: 1224–1225
- Bengali calendar: 709–710
- Berber calendar: 2253
- English Regnal year: 31 Edw. 1 – 32 Edw. 1
- Buddhist calendar: 1847
- Burmese calendar: 665
- Byzantine calendar: 6811–6812
- Chinese calendar: 壬寅年 (Water Tiger); 4000 or 3793 — to — 癸卯年 (Water Rabbit); 4001 or 3794
- Coptic calendar: 1019–1020
- Discordian calendar: 2469
- Ethiopian calendar: 1295–1296
- Hebrew calendar: 5063–5064
- Hindu calendars
- Vikram Samvat: 1359–1360
- Shaka Samvat: 1224–1225
- Kali Yuga: 4403–4404
- Holocene calendar: 11303
- Igbo calendar: 303–304
- Iranian calendar: 681–682
- Islamic calendar: 702–703
- Japanese calendar: Kengen 2 / Kagen 1 (嘉元元年)
- Javanese calendar: 1214–1215
- Julian calendar: 1303; MCCCIII
- Korean calendar: 3636
- Minguo calendar: 609 before ROC 民前609年
- Nanakshahi calendar: −165
- Thai solar calendar: 1845–1846
- Tibetan calendar: ཆུ་ཕོ་སྟག་ལོ་ (male Water-Tiger); 1429 or 1048 or 276 — to — ཆུ་མོ་ཡོས་ལོ་ (female Water-Hare); 1430 or 1049 or 277

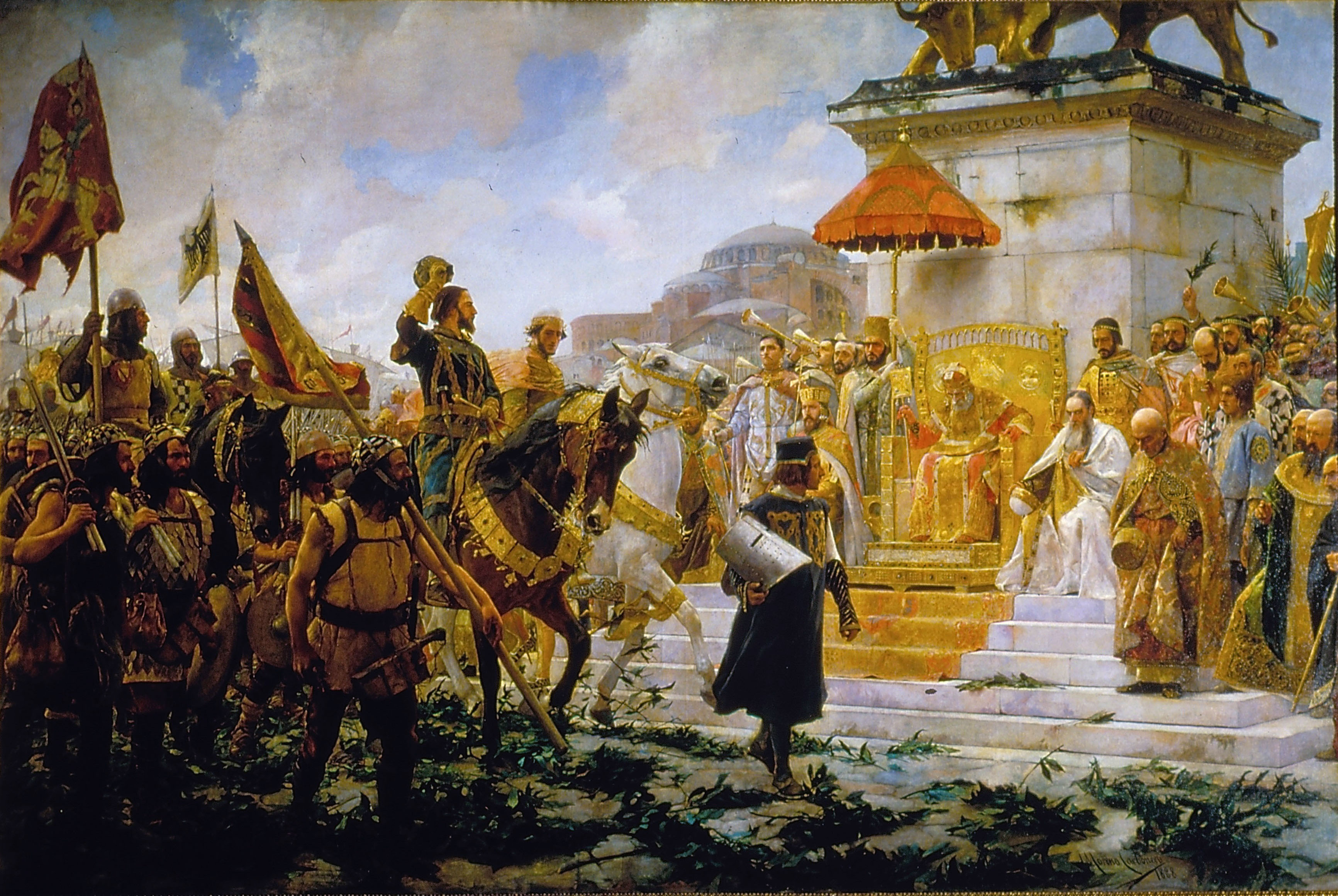
Roger de Flor arrives in Constantinople by José Moreno Carbonero (1888).

Year 1303 (MCCCIII) was a common year starting on Tuesday of the Julian calendar.

== Events ==
=== January–March ===
- January 17 – A major earthquake strikes Byzantium and Constantinople (now Istanbul in Turkey). Byzantine Emperor Michael IX Palaiologos spreads the word that the former Patriarch of the Eastern Church, Athanasius I had given him a warning about the imminent wrath of God against the city.
- January 21 – John XII is forced to resign as Ecumenical Patriarch of Constantinople and leader of the Eastern Orthodox Church after the January 17 earthquake.
- January 28 – In India, the siege of Chittorgarh, capital of the Medapata Kingdom (now in the state of Rajasthan), begins as the Sultan of Delhi, Alauddin Khalji, seeks to acquire the territory of the Medapata Emperor, Ratnasimha.
- February 24 – Battle of Roslin: Scottish forces (some 8,000 men) led by John Comyn III "the Red" and Simon Fraser ambush and defeat an English scouting party under John Segrave at Roslin. During the battle, the Scots attack the English camp, capturing Segrave and several other nobles. But a second English brigade manages to rescue Segrave in a pitched battle. Later, the English army is again defeated, according to sources they lose between 28,000 and 30,000 men.
- March 17 – Joan II of the Anscarids becomes the Countess and ruler of Burgundy, a free state within the Holy Roman Empire (now the département of Jura in France), upon the death of her father Otto IV.

=== April–June ===
- April 4 – Battle of Arques: Flemish forces (some 10,000 men) led by William of Jülich ("the Younger") defeats a French army at Arques in Flanders. During the battle, the French cavalry (1,600 men) tries to break the Flemish infantry militia formations, but to no avail. Finally, the French withdraw to Saint-Omer, leaving 300 dead behind. Later, William receives a warm reception in Bruges as a liberator in May.
- April 20 – Pope Boniface VIII founds the University of Rome with the papal bull In Supremae praeminentia Dignitatis, as a Studium for ecclesiastical studies under his control, making it the first pontifical university.
- April 22 – Battle of Marj al-Saffar: Egyptian Mamluk forces (some 20,000 men) under Sultan Al-Nasir Muhammad defeat a Mongol army and their Armenian allies led by Qutlugh-Shah, on the plain of Marj al-Saffar. After the battle, Egyptian forces enters Damascus and chases the Mongols as far as Al-Qaryatayn in Syria. Al-Nasir returns to Cairo in triumph through the Bab al-Nasr ("Victory Gate") with chained prisoners of war.
- May 16 – King Edward I of England assembles 7,500 troops at Roxburgh to prepare for a resumption of his campaign against the Kingdom of Scotland, to begin after concluding peace between England and France. In advance of the invasion, Edward orders that three pre-fabricated pontoon bridges be built and transported, in a fleet of 27 ships. After crossing into Scotland, Edward and his soldiers burns hamlet and towns, granges and granaries. Meanwhile, Richard Óg de Burgh, "the Red Earl" with forces from Ireland capture the castles of Rothesay and Inverkip.
- May 20 – Treaty of Paris: King Philip the Fair of France signs a peace treaty with Edward Longshanks, King of England. According to the terms of the treaty, Gascony is restored to England – as well as the cities of Bordeaux and Bayonne. In return, Edward swears allegiance to Philip as his vassal and agrees that Philipp's daughter, Isabella of France, be married to his son Edward of Caernarfon, until she is old enough.
- May 26 – Elizabeth Richeza, 14-year-old daughter of the late King Przemysl II of Poland, marries her father's former rival and the new King of Poland, King Wenceslaus II of Bohemia. The marriage takes place at the Prague Cathedral in Bohemia (now in the Czech Republic, and Elizabeth is crowned as Queen Consort of Bohemia.
- May 31 – Pope Boniface VIII orders the nullification of the election of Wenceslaus as King of Hungary, and declares that Károly Róbert, son of the late Hungarian king Charles Martel of Anjou, is the rightful claimant to the throne. The Pope also threatens Wenceslaus with excommunication from the Roman Catholic Church if Wenceslaus continues to style himself "King of Hungary". The decision causes a breakdown of Hungary between supporters of Wenceslaus and supporters of Károly.
- June 18 – Scottish nobles Edmund Comyn and Simon Fraser lead an invasion from Dumfriesshire in Scotland, crossing the border into England at Cumberland and laying waste to Carlisle and its surrounding area.
- June 23 – Athanasius I returns to leadership of the Eastern Orthodox church in Byzantium, receiving recognition as the Ecumenical Patriarch of Constantinople almost 10 years of having been driven from that office.

=== July–September ===
- August 8 – 1303 Crete earthquake: An earthquake destroys the Lighthouse of Alexandria in Egypt, one of the Seven wonders of the World.
- August 26 – Siege of Chittorgarh: Delhi forces led by Sultan Alauddin Khalji capture the massive Chittor Fort in northern India, after an 8-month-long siege. Alauddin orders a general massacre of Chittor's population.
- August – The 17-year-old King Ferdinand the Summoned, supervised by his mother, Queen-Regent María de Molina, signs a peace treaty at Córdoba with Granada for three years. In return, Muhammad III renews his vassalage with Castile and pays the same tribute given as to his father, the late King Sancho the Brave. The strategic port city of Tarifa remains in Castilian hands.
- September 7 – Boniface VIII is imprisoned by Guillaume de Nogaret, French councillor and advisor, on behalf of Philip the Fair at his residence in Anagni. During the incident, Gregory Bicskei, archbishop of Esztergom, is killed. Boniface is for three days held in captivity, where he is beaten, tortured and nearly executed.
- September 16 – The Kagen era begins in Japan during the reign of the Emperor Gonijo.
- September 25 – 1303 Hongdong earthquake: An earthquake destroys the cities of Taiyuan and Pingyang, some 200,000 people are killed.
- September – Emperor Andronikos II Palaiologos, facing a possible siege of Constantinople by Ottoman-Turkish forces, seeks support from the European kingdoms. He makes Roger de Flor, Italian military adventurer and nobleman, an offer of service. Roger with his fleet and army (some 7,000 men), now known as the Catalan Company, departs from Messina with 36 ships (including 18 galleys), and arrives in Constantinople. He is adopted into the imperial family, Andronikos appoints him as grand duke (megas doux) and commander-in-chief of the Byzantine army and fleet.

=== October–December ===
- October 11 – Pope Boniface VIII dies while imprisoned at Anagni, after a pontificate of 8 years.
- October 22 – At the papal conclave in Rome to select a new Roman catholic Pontiff, Cardinal Nicolò Boccasini, Bishop of Ostia, is elected unanimously.
- October 27 – The coronation of Cardinal Boccasini as Pope Benedict XI, 194th pope of the Roman Catholic Church, is performed at St. Peter's Basilica by Cardinal Matteo Rosso Orsini.
- November 9 – Edward I Longshanks, King of England spends the winter at Dunfermline Abbey where he plans the attack on Stirling Castle. He stations an army in the field and operations continue throughout the winter. An English force (some 1,000 men) raids and plunder into Lennox as far as Drymen. Meanwhile, Lord John Botetourt raids Galloway in strength, with four bannerets (some 3,000 men).
- December 18 – Pope Benedict XI issues a mandate directing that the rights of Cardinal Jean Lemoine of France, to income from the dioceses of Bayeux and Amiens is to be protected while Lemoine is serving as papal legate.

== By place ==
=== Byzantine Empire ===
- Autumn – Battle of Dimbos: The Byzantine governors (tekfurs) of Prusa, Adranos, Kestel, and Ulubat begin a military campaign against the Ottoman-Turkish forces of Sultan Osman I. They attack the Ottoman capital city of Yenişehir and proceed to relieve Nicaea, which is under an Ottoman blockade. Osman musters a 5,000-strong army and defeats the Byzantine forces at a mountain pass near Yenişehir.

=== Asia ===
- Mongol invasion of India: Mongol forces appear outside Delhi and begin the siege of the city. Alauddin Khalji and a Delhi vanguard army return to the capital, while the Delhi garrison resists assaults of the Mongols.
- Autumn – Mongol forces lift the siege of Delhi after two months, they retreat with great plunder and war booty. Meanwhile, Alauddin Khaliji orders to strengthen border fortresses along the Mongol routes to India.

== Births ==
- May 19 – Saw Zein (or Binnya Ran De), Burmese ruler (d. 1330)
- July 12 – Hugh de Courtenay, English nobleman and knight (d. 1377)
- Bridget of Sweden (or Birgitta), Swedish nun and mystic (d. 1373)
- Catherine II, Latin empress consort, regent and co-ruler (d. 1346)
- Henry Ferrers, English nobleman, constable and knight (d. 1343)
- Hōjō Shigetoki, Japanese nobleman (rensho) and official (d. 1333)
- Marie of Évreux, French noblewoman (House of Capet) (d. 1335)
- Willem IV of Horne, Dutch nobleman, diplomat and knight (d. 1343)

== Deaths ==
- March 4
  - Daniel of Moscow, Russian nobleman and prince (b. 1261)
  - Theodora Palaiologina, Byzantine empress consort (b. 1240)
- March 17 – Otto IV, French nobleman and co-ruler (House of Ivrea)
- May 19 – Ivo of Kermartin, French priest, judge and saint (b. 1253)
- July 8 – Procopius of Ustyug, German merchant and wonderworker
- August 8 – Henry of Castile (the Senator), Spanish prince (b. 1230)
- August 9 – Thomas Maule, Scottish nobleman, captain and knight
- August 25 – Ninshō, Japanese monk, disciple and priest (b. 1217)
- September 7 – Gregory Bicskei, Hungarian prelate and archbishop
- October 11 – Boniface VIII, pope of the Catholic Church (b. 1230)
- October 27 – Beatrice of Castile, queen consort of Portugal (b. 1242)
- November 1 – Hugh XIII of Lusignan, French nobleman (b. 1259)
- December 9 – Richard Gravesend, English archdeacon and bishop
- Drakpa Odzer, Tibetan monk, abbot and Imperial Preceptor (b. 1246)
- Elizabeth of Sicily, queen consort of Hungary and Croatia (b. 1261)
- Hajib Shakarbar, Indian scholar, poet, writer and mystic (b. 1213)
- Ibn Abd al-Malik, Almohad historian, biographer and writer (b. 1237)
- John of St. Amand, French pharmacist and philosopher (b. 1230)
- Otto VI (the Short), German nobleman and co-ruler (b. 1255)
