= Chagay =

Chagay may refer to:

- Chagai (disambiguation), several entities in Pakistan
- Haggai, a Hewbrew prophet
- Chagay, a Koryo-saram spelling of the Korean name Cha

== See also ==
- Chagatai (disambiguation)
