= Kalgali =

Village in Balochistan, Pakistan

Coordinates: 28°00′N 65°54′E

Kalgali is a village in Washuk District, in the northern part of Balochistan province of Pakistan.
