= Washuk District =

Coordinates: 27°51′N 64°0′E

Washuk District ضلع واشک
- District of Balochistan
- Washuk District
- Country: Pakistan
- Province: Balochistan
- Division: Rakhshan
- Established: 2005
- Headquarters: Washuk

Government
  - Type: District Administration
  - Deputy Commissioner: Mansoor Qazi
  - District Police Officer: N/A
  - District Health Officer: N/A

Area
  - District of Balochistan: 33,093 km^{2} (12,777 sq mi)

Population (2023)
  - District of Balochistan: 302,623
  - Density: 9.1446/km^{2} (23.684/sq mi)
  - Urban: 41,107
  - Rural: 261,516

Literacy
  - Literacy rate: Total: (21.58%); Male: (26.76%); Female: (15.76%)
- Time zone: UTC+5 (PST)

Washuk District (Balochi and Urdu: واشک) is a district in Balochistan province of Pakistan. The town of Washuk, which serves as the district headquarters, is located in the center of the district.

== Administration ==
Washuk District was once part of Kharan District in Balochistan province. It was declared a separate district in 2007, but its governance issues are largely managed by Kharan's district administration.

It is further subdivided into 3 Tehsils or subdistricts, 10 union councils and 216 mauzas (villages).

Tehsil	Area (km²)	Pop. (2023)	Density (ppl/km²) (2023)	Literacy rate (2023)	Union Councils
Besima Tehsil	6,014	63,368	10.54	31.83%	...
Mashkel Tehsil	11,663	67,142	5.76	16.33%	...
Washuk Tehsil	7,494	55,585	7.42	18.10%	...
Nag Tehsil	4,338	57,467	13.25	18.02%	...
Shahgori Tehsil	3,584	59,061	16.48	23.55%	...

== Geography ==
Washuk District is spread over 33,093 km^{2}, of which only 71,520 hectares are arable. The rest consists mostly of barren desert and mountains of the Central Makran Range.

== Demographics ==
Historical population
Year	Pop.	±% p.a.
1951	N/A	—
1961	N/A	—
1972	N/A	—
1981	N/A	—
1998	110,009	—
2017	175,712	+2.50%
2023	302,623	+9.48%

=== Population ===
As of the 2023 census, Washuk district has 49,049 households and a population of 302,623. The district has a sex ratio of 116.63 males to 100 females and a literacy rate of 21.58%: 26.76% for males and 15.76% for females. 122,766 (40.6% of the surveyed population) are under 10 years of age. 41,107 (13.58%) live in urban areas.

=== Religion ===
In the 2023 census, 1,045 (0.35%) people in the district were from religious minorities, mainly Christians.

=== Language ===
Languages of Washuk district (2023)
1. Balochi (68.3%)
2. Brahui (31.5%)
3. Others (0.24%)

At the time of the 2023 census, 68.29% of the population spoke Balochi and 31.47% Brahui as their first language. Balochi is majority in Mashkel, Shahgori and Washuk tehsils, while Besima and Nag tehsils are Brahui-speaking

== Education ==
According to the Alif Ailaan Pakistan District Education Rankings 2014, Washuk is ranked 131 out of 146 districts in Pakistan in terms of the quality of education. For facilities and infrastructure, the district is ranked 132 out of 146. A detailed picture of the district's education performance is also available online.
