= N-30 National Highway =

Road in Pakistan

National Highway 30
- قومی شاہراہ ٣٠
- قومی شاہراہ ۳۰

Route information
- Maintained by NHA
- Length: 110 km (68 mi)

Major junctions
- South end: Basima
- North end: Khuzdar

Location
- Country: Pakistan

Highway system
- Roads in Pakistan

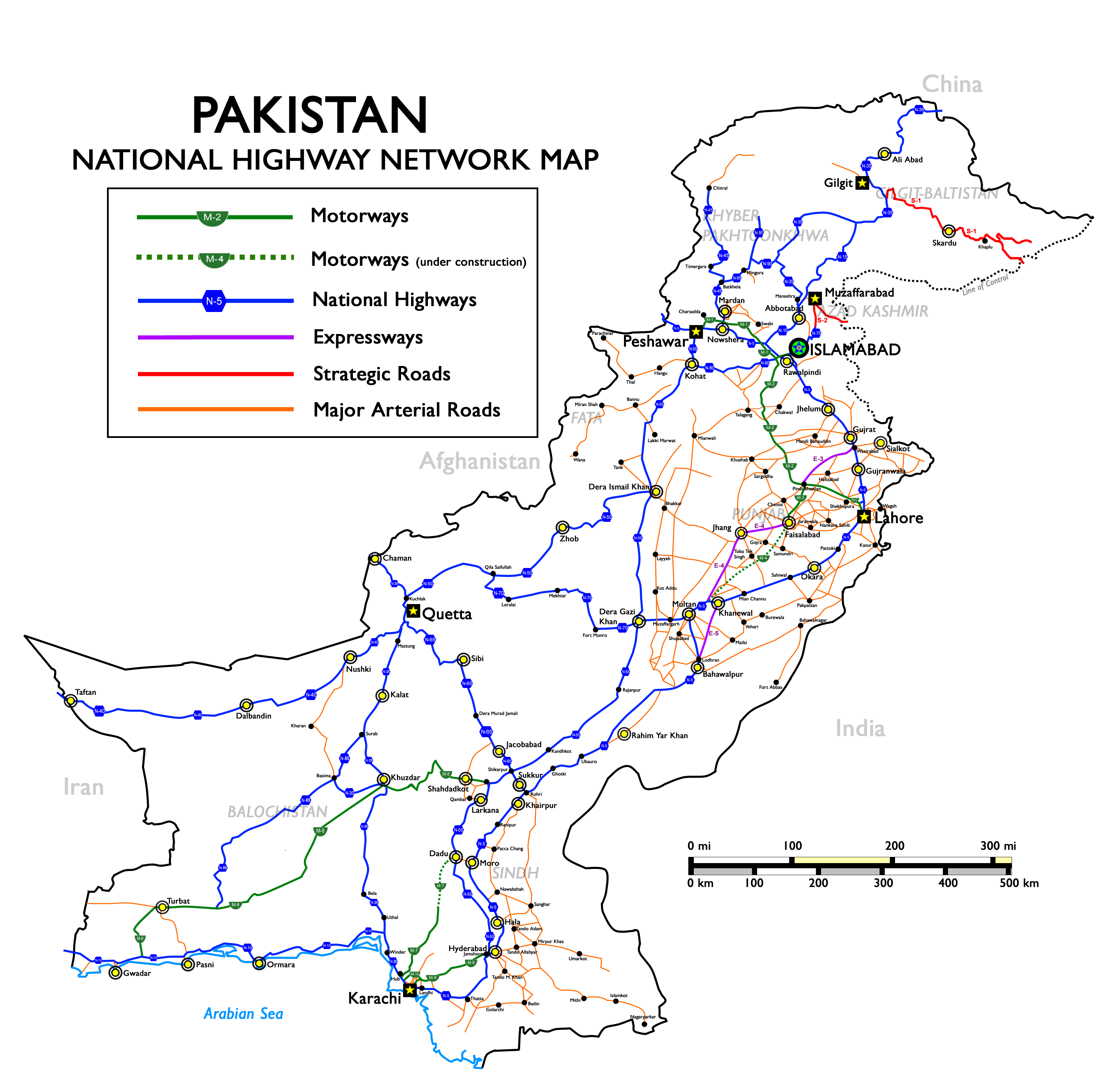
Map of National Highways of Pakistan also indicating N-30

The N-30 or National Highway 30 (Urdu: قومی شاہراہ ۳۰) is a 110 km national highway in Pakistan which extends from Basima to Khuzdar in Balochistan province. It is maintained and operated by Pakistan's National Highway Authority.

== See also ==
- Motorways of Pakistan
- Transport in Pakistan
