= Nausherwani tombs =

12th-century burial site in Pakistan

Nausherwani tombs, also spelled as Noshirwani tombs, are located near Qila Ladgasht in Mashkel tehsil, Kharan District, Balochistan, Pakistan.

The Nausherwani tombs are a set of nine tombs dating back nearly 800 years. According to district gazetteer of Kharan (1906) there were nine tombs of which two have collapsed by 2004. Nikodar Ooghul belonged to the Arghun dynasty and he converted to Islam and adopted the name Sultan Ahmad Khan in 681 Hijri (1282/1283).

== See also ==
- Kharan District
- Mashkel
- Qila Ladgasht
- Damb
