= Qila Ladgasht =

Qila Ladgasht (Urdu: ماشکیل) is a Union Council located in Mashkel tehsil in Western Chaghi District, Balochistan, Pakistan.

Mashkel is one of the three UCs of Tehsil Mashkel, and is the biggest Union Council of the tehsil.

== See also ==
- Kharan District
- Mashkel
