= Washuk =

Washuk واشک
- Town
- Location within Balochistan, Pakistan Location within Pakistan
- Coordinates: 27°43′23″N 64°48′44″E
- Country: Pakistan
- Province: Balochistan, Pakistan
- District: Washuk District
- Constituency: PB-47 (Kharan-II)

Population (2023 census)
  - Total: 41,107

Washuk (Urdu and Balochi: واشک) is a rural town that serves as the district headquarters of Washuk District, Balochistan, Pakistan. It has a population of 41,107, with 21,028 males and 20,079 according to the 2023 Census of Pakistan. The Washuk tehsil has a population of 55,585, of whom 99.9% speak the Balochi language.

== Demographics ==
=== Population ===
Historical population
Year	Pop.	±% p.a.
1951	...	—
1961	...	—
1972	...	—
1981	...	—
1998	...	—
2017	21,872	—
2023	41,107	+11.09%

As of the 2023 census, Washuk has population of 41,107.
