= Chagai =

Chagai may refer to:

- Chagai District, a district in Balochistan, Pakistan
- Chagai, Pakistan, the capital city of Chagai District
- Chagai Hills, a mountainous region in the district
- Chagai-I, the codename for Pakistan's first nuclear weapon tests
- Chagai-II, the country's second nuclear weapon test

== See also ==
- Chagai Zamir, an Israeli paralympic champion
- Chaggai, a Hebrew prophet and one of the twelve minor prophets in the Hebrew Bible
- Chagay (disambiguation)
