= Kharan District =

Coordinates: 28°00′N 64°30′E

Kharan District ضلع خاران ھاران دمگ ضلع خاران
- District of Balochistan
- Kharan
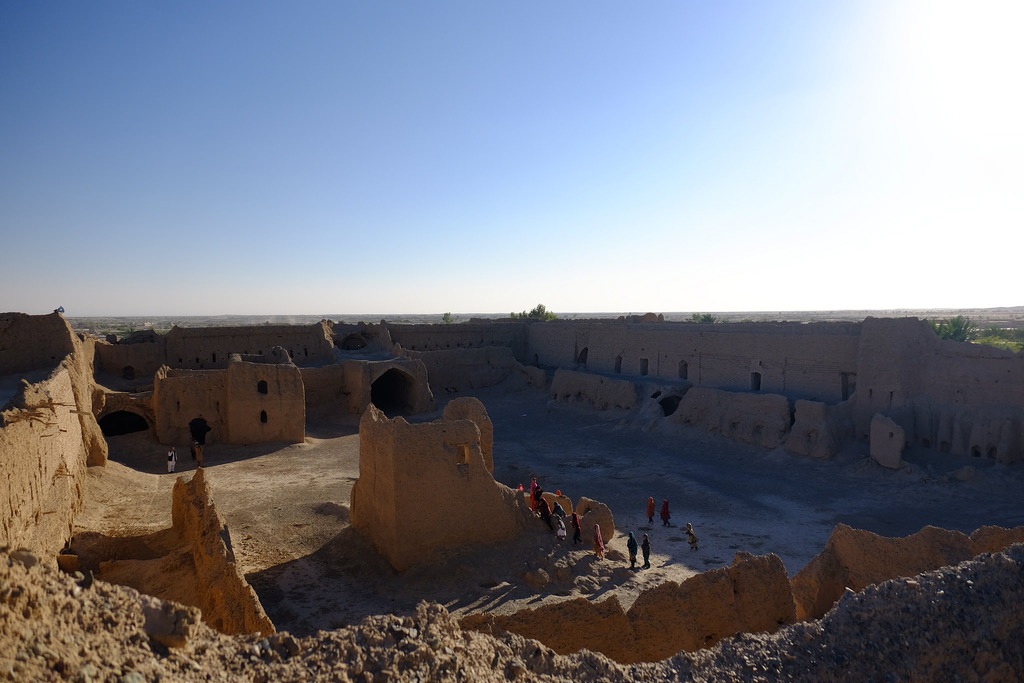
- Kharan Fort

- Map of Balochistan with Kharan District highlighted
- Country: Pakistan
- Province: Balochistan
- Division: Rakhshan
- Established: March 15, 1952
- Headquarters: Kharan

Government
  - Type: District Administration
  - Deputy Commissioner: N/A
  - District Police Officer: N/A
  - District Health Officer: N/A

Area
  - District of Balochistan: 14,958 km^{2} (5,775 sq mi)

Population (2023)
  - District of Balochistan: 260,352
  - Density: 17.4/km^{2} (45/sq mi)
  - Urban: 80,806 (31.04%)
  - Rural: 179,546 (68.96%)

Literacy
  - Literacy rate: Total: (41.07%); Male: (51.78%); Female: (29.36%)
- Time zone: UTC+5 (PST)
- District Councils: 9 Union Councils
- Number of Tehsils: 3 (1 Sub Tehsils

Kharan District (Balochi: ھاران دمگ; Urdu: ضلع خاران) is a district in the Balochistan province of Pakistan. The headquarters of the district is the town of Kharan. It is also the divisional headquarters of Rakhshan Division.

== Administration ==
Tehsil	Area (km²)	Pop. (2023)	Density (ppl/km²) (2023)	Literacy rate (2023)	Union Councils
Kharan Tehsil	2,941	104,035	35.37	48.63%	...
Sar-Kharan Tehsil	3,539	86,015	24.30	36.70%	...
Tohumulk Tehsil	6,347	49,803	7.85	34.81%	...
Patkain Tehsil	2,131	20,499	9.62	35.06%	...

== Demographics ==
Historical population
Year	Pop.	±% p.a.
1951	N/A	—
1961	N/A	—
1972	N/A	—
1981	N/A	—
1998	96,900	—
2017	162,766	+2.77%
2023	260,352	+8.14%

=== Population ===
As of the 2023 census, Kharan district has 35,843 households and a population of 260,352. The district has a sex ratio of 115.79 males to 100 females and a literacy rate of 41.07%: 51.78% for males and 29.36% for females. 107,876 (41.43% of the surveyed population) are under 10 years of age. 80,806 (31.04%) live in urban areas.

=== Religion ===
Religions in Kharan district (2023)
Religion	Percent
Islam	97.95%
Hinduism	1.73%
Other	0.32%

In the 2023 census, 4,480 (2.05%) people in the district were from religious minorities, mainly Hindus.

Languages of Kharan district (2023)
1. Balochi (91.2%)
2. Brahui (8.50%)
3. Others (0.26%)

=== Language ===
At the time of the 2023 census, 91.24% of the population spoke Balochi and 8.5% Brahui as their first language.

== Education ==
According to the Pakistan District Education Rankings 2017, district Kharan is ranked at number 110 out of the 141 ranked districts in Pakistan on the education score index. This index considers learning, gender parity and retention in the district.

Literacy rate in 2014–15 of population 10 years and older in the district stands at 44% whereas for females it is only 27%.

Post primary access is a major issue in the district with 78% schools being at primary level. Compare this with high schools which constitute only 8% of government schools in the district. This is also reflected in the enrolment figures for 2016–17 with 6,987 students enrolled in class 1 to 5 and only 170 students enrolled in class 9 and 10.

Gender disparity is another issue in the district. Only 26% schools in the district are girls’ schools. Access to education for girls is a major issue in the district and is also reflected in the low literacy rates for females.

Moreover, the schools in the district lack basic facilities. According to Alif Ailaan district education rankings 2017, the district is ranked at number 141 out of the 155 districts of Pakistan for primary school infrastructure. At the middle school level, it is ranked at number 126 out of the 155 districts. These rankings take into account the basic facilities available in schools including drinking water, working toilet, availability of electricity, existence of a boundary wall and general building condition. Approximately 4 out of 5 schools do not have electricity in them. 1 out 3 schools lack a toilet and 3 out of 5 do not have a boundary wall. About 1 out of 2 schools do not have clean drinking water.

Minerals of Karan District
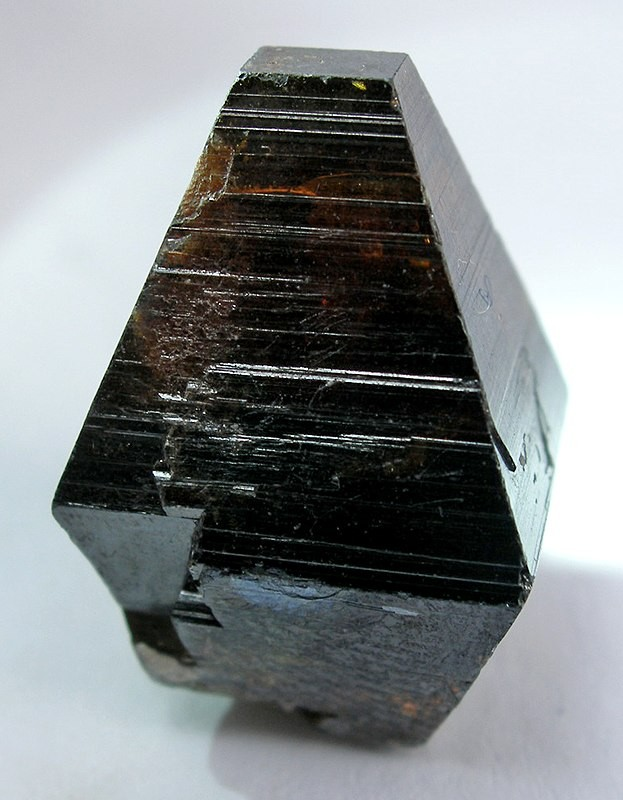
Anatase

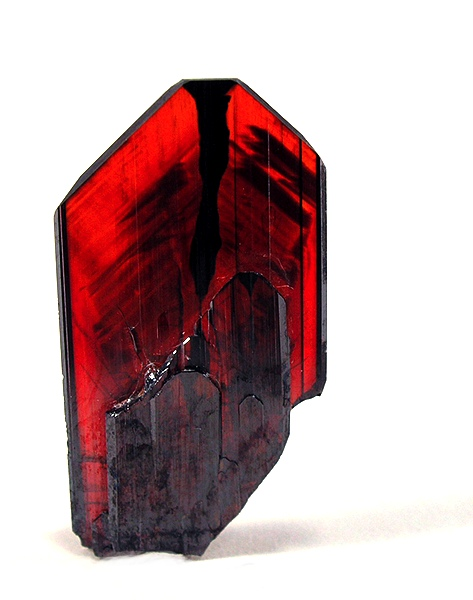
Cherry-red brookite

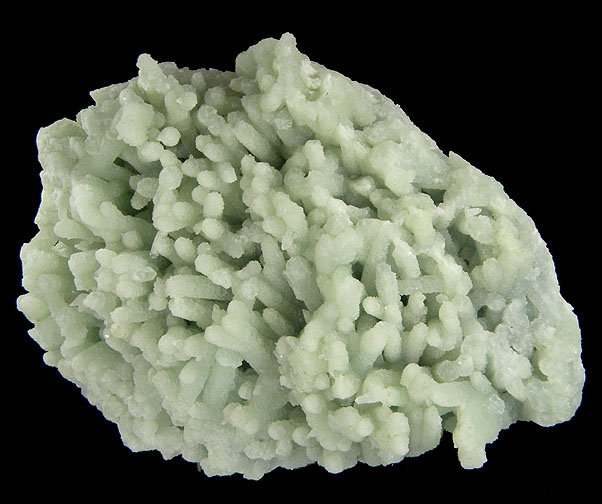
Prehnite

== See also ==
- Kharan (princely state)
- Nausherwani tombs
- Qila Ladgasht
