= PB-32 Chagai =

Constituency of the Provincial Assembly of Balochistan, Pakistan

PB-31 Chagai
- Constituency for the Provincial Assembly of Balochistan
- Region: Chagai District

Current constituency
- Party: Balochistan Awami Party
- Member: Muhammad Arif
- Created from: PB-39 Chagai-I

PB-31 Chagai (پی بی-31 چاغی) is a constituency of the Provincial Assembly of Balochistan.

== General elections 2024 ==
Provincial election 2024: PB-32 Chagai
Party	Candidate	Votes	%	±%
BAP	Sadiq Sanjrani	19,748	38.37	
JUI (F)	Aman Ullah	17,389	33.79	
PPP	Muhammad Arif	7,533	14.64	
Independent	Nezamuddin Barahuee	1,542	3.00	
BNP (M)	Yar Muhammad	1,487	2.89	
PML(N)	Umair Muhammad Hasni	1,341	2.61	
Others	Others (sixteen candidates)	2,424	4.70	
Turnout		54,656	44.45	
Total valid votes		51,464	94.16	
Rejected ballots		3,192	5.84	
Majority		2,359	4.58	
Registered electors		122,951		

== See also ==
- PB-31 Washuk
- PB-33 Kharan
