= Narhar =

- village
- Location in Rajasthan, India Narhar (India)
- Coordinates: 28°18′N 75°36′E
- Country: India
- State: Rajasthan

Languages
  - Official: Hindi
- Time zone: UTC+5:30 (IST)
- Vehicle registration: RJ

Narhar is an ancient village situated in Jhunjhunu district in Rajasthan, India.
