= PB-31 Washuk =

Constituency of the Provincial Assembly of Balochistan, Pakistan

- Constituency for the Provincial Assembly of Balochistan
- Region: Washuk District

Current constituency
- Party: Muttahida Majlis-e-Amal
- Member: Mir Zabid Ali Reki
- Created from: PB-47 Kharan-II

PB-31 Washuk (پی بی-31 واشک) is a constituency of the Provincial Assembly of Balochistan.

== General elections 2024 ==
Provincial election 2024: PB-31 Washuk
Party	Candidate	Votes	%	±%
JUI (F)	Mir Zabid Ali Reki	17,385	49.82	
PML(N)	Mir Mujeeb-ur-Rehman Muhammad Hasani	16,473	47.21	
Others	Others (seventeen candidates)	1,039	2.97	
Turnout		36,686	54.89	
Total valid votes		34,897	95.12	
Rejected ballots		1,789	4.88	
Majority		912	2.61	
Registered electors		66,841		

== See also ==
- PB-30 Panjgur-II
- PB-32 Chagai
