= Nok Kundi Tehsil =

Pakistani town

Nok Kundi نوکنڈی, نوک کنڈی Western Chagai
- City
- Nok Kundi
- Location within Balochistan, Pakistan Location within Pakistan
- Coordinates: 28.825887°N 62.750025°E
- Country: Pakistan
- Province: Balochistan
- District: Western Chagai
- Division: Rakhshan Division
- Established: 1950

Area
  - Total: 16,092 km^{2} (6,213 sq mi)
- Elevation: 679 m (2,228 ft)

Population (2023 census)
  - Total: 30,625
- Time zone: UTC+5 (PST)
  - Summer (DST): UTC+6 (PDT)
- Postal code: 95050

Nok Kundi (Urdu: نوک کنڈی, lit. 'the blunt point') is a city and administrative headquarters of Western Chaghi located in western Balochistan, Pakistan, near the Iran and Afghanistan border. The city has a population of 30,625, It is located at an altitude of 649 m (2130 ft). Nokkundi is famous for its mineral resources. Nokkundi city is surrounded by desert and mountains

Nok Kundi, meaning "the blunt point", is a city region and administrative headquarters located in western Balochistan, Pakistan. Historically, the area was known as Dzaranga, meaning "water-producing land," which the Greeks Hellenised to Drangiana in their literature. The original term, "Zaranka," translates to "watermill" or "spring," and is found in both old Balochi and Persian, referring to the region as "Waterland."

Nok kundi (also spelled Nokkundi ) is a city and the administrative headquarters of the newly established Western Chaghi District in the Rakhshan Division of Balochistan, Pakistan. Prior to the administrative bifurcation of the original Chagai District, it served as a major tehsil center within the region.

== Climate ==
Nok Kundi has a hot desert climate (Köppen climate classification BWh) with extremely hot summers and mild winters. There is virtually no rainfall whole the year. The climate is very dry with just 35 millimetres (1.4 in) of rainfall each year.

Climate data for Nok Kundi
Month	Jan	Feb	Mar	Apr	May	Jun	Jul	Aug	Sep	Oct	Nov	Dec	Year
Record high °C (°F)	31.1 (88.0)	33.0 (91.4)	37.8 (100.0)	44.0 (111.2)	47.5 (117.5)	49.6 (121.3)	48.3 (118.9)	48.5 (119.3)	46.0 (114.8)	43.0 (109.4)	36.0 (96.8)	29.0 (84.2)	49.6 (121.3)
Mean daily maximum °C (°F)	19.4 (66.9)	22.8 (73.0)	28.1 (82.6)	34.8 (94.6)	39.9 (103.8)	42.9 (109.2)	43.5 (110.3)	41.9 (107.4)	38.9 (102.0)	33.9 (93.0)	27.2 (81.0)	21.6 (70.9)	32.9 (91.2)
Daily mean °C (°F)	12.1 (53.8)	15.1 (59.2)	20.6 (69.1)	27.2 (81.0)	32.7 (90.9)	35.5 (95.9)	36.5 (97.7)	34.7 (94.5)	31.1 (88.0)	25.6 (78.1)	19.1 (66.4)	13.6 (56.5)	25.3 (77.5)
Mean daily minimum °C (°F)	4.8 (40.6)	7.6 (45.7)	13.1 (55.6)	19.8 (67.6)	25.3 (77.5)	28.0 (82.4)	29.5 (85.1)	27.6 (81.7)	22.9 (73.2)	17.3 (63.1)	10.9 (51.6)	5.7 (42.3)	17.7 (63.9)
Record low °C (°F)	−8 (18)	−10.0 (14.0)	−1.1 (30.0)	7.0 (44.6)	8.1 (46.6)	16.1 (61.0)	18.9 (66.0)	17.8 (64.0)	10.0 (50.0)	2.0 (35.6)	−4.4 (24.1)	−8.3 (17.1)	−10.0 (14.0)
Average precipitation mm (inches)	10.0 (0.39)	9.4 (0.37)	8.7 (0.34)	2.1 (0.08)	0.5 (0.02)	2.7 (0.11)	0.8 (0.03)	0.3 (0.01)	0.0 (0.0)	0.4 (0.02)	1.3 (0.05)	2.5 (0.10)	38.7 (1.52)
Average precipitation days (≥ 1.0 mm)	1.1	1.3	1.6	0.4	0.2	0.1	0.1	0.0	0.0	0.1	0.3	0.6	5.8
Average relative humidity (%)	47	46	42	39	35	35	32	27	29	39	38	46	38
Mean monthly sunshine hours	219.2	205.1	250.4	280.5	313.5	299.1	286.9	319.9	274.0	290.3	254.6	224.9	3,218.4
Source: NOAA (extremes, sun 1961-1990), Deutscher Wetterdienst (humidity 1936-1940), Ogimet

== See also ==
- No kundi railway station
- Kidnapping of Czech tourists in Balochistan
