= Mashkel Tehsil =

Mashkel
- Tehsil
- Location within Balochistan, Pakistan Location within Pakistan
- Coordinates: 27°43′30″N 63°21′00″E
- District: Western Chagai

Area
  - Total: 11,663 km^{2} (4,503 sq mi)

Population (2023)
  - Total: 29,543
  - Density: 2.5331/km^{2} (6.5606/sq mi)
- Time zone: UTC+5 (PST)

Mashkel (ماشکیل Urdu: ماشکیل, romanized: maśxēl) is a tehsil in Western Chagai District, Balochistan, Pakistan. It is the biggest Tehsil of District Western Chaghi and lies on the border between Iran and Pakistan.

Mashkel is officially a tehsil of District Western Chagai, and Nokkundi is the headquarters of District Western Chagai.

According to the 2023 census, Mashkhel has a population of around 67,142. It is known for its date trees and deserts.

== See also ==
- Districts of Pakistan
  - Districts of Khyber Pakhtunkhwa, Pakistan
  - Districts of Punjab, Pakistan
  - Districts of Balochistan, Pakistan
  - Districts of Sindh, Pakistan
  - Districts of Azad Kashmir
  - Districts of Gilgit-Baltistan
- Divisions of Pakistan
  - Divisions of Balochistan
  - Divisions of Khyber Pakhtunkhwa
  - Divisions of Punjab
  - Divisions of Sindh
  - Divisions of Azad Kashmir
  - Divisions of Gilgit-Baltistan
