= Shetye (name) =

Shetye (Marathi: शेट्ये) is an Indian Hindu surname, typically found in Western India.

== Surname ==
- Satish Ramnath Shetye (born 1950), is an Indian geophysicist, oceanographer and a former vice chancellor of the University of Goa.
- Poorva Shetye (born 1993), is an Indian International Swimmer, who is specialized in 50 m, 100 m and 200 m breaststroke.
- Sadanand Shetye, is an Indian Kabaddi player belonging to the state of Maharashtra.

== See also ==
- Marathi people
- Konkani people
