= Dhari Island =

Pakistani island

Native name: دھاری جزیرہ
- Interactive map of Dhari Island

Geography
- Location: Arabian Sea
- Coordinates: 24°47′0″N 67°10′40″E
- Archipelago: Indus Delta
- Adjacent to: Korangi Creek

Administration
- Pakistan

Demographics
- Population: Ininhabited

Dhari Island is an uninhabited island of Pakistan situated within Karachi's Korangi Creek.

== Location ==
The island lies northeast of the peninsular area known as Defence, along Sindh's Arabian Sea coastline, and approximately 1.5 kilometres (0.93 mi) southeast of the Ibrahim Hyderi fishing village. It represents the westernmost extent of the Indus River Delta archipelago, with the adjacent Khiprianwala situated further to the south.

The island is located in a tidal zone, experiencing a fluctuation of nearly three meters between high and low tide.
