= List of islands of Pakistan =

Islands of Pakistan

This is a list of islands of Pakistan, organised from west to east.

== Balochistan coast ==
- Several unnamed sandy islets in the Jiwani Coastal Wetland lagoon.
- Manbaar, an islet near Pishukan, between the southwest of Gwadar West Bay and the Arabian Sea.
- Zalzala Koh, a small island that emerged in the north of Gwadar West Bay during the 2013 Balochistan earthquakes, and disappeared by 2016.
- Astola Island, one of the largest offshore islands, about 39 kilometres (24 mi) southeast of Pasni.
- Malan Island, a volcanic mud island that has appeared and disappeared several times.
- Several unnamed sandy islets in the Miani Hor lagoon.
- An unnamed rocky islet about 370 metres west of Phokara beach, at the northern end of Gadani Ship Breaking Yard (25°05'54"N 66°42'41"E).
- The Churna–Kaio Islands:
  - Churna Island, a small island about 9 km (5.6 mi) west of the mouth of the Hub River, at the boundary between the provinces of Balochistan and Sindh.
  - Kaio Island, a small rocky island about 2.2 km (1.4 mi) west of the southern end of Gadani Ship Breaking Yard (25°01'50"N 66°41'19"E).
  - A group of unnamed rocky islets and skerries between 400 m (1,300 ft) and 1 km (0.62 mi) from the Gadani shore, about 3 km (1.9 mi) southeast of Kaio island.

== Sindh coast ==
- An unnamed rocky islet about 130 m (430 ft) from the Nathiagali shore (24°50'04"N 66°42'59"E).
- The Kiamari archipelago:
  - Kakapir, an inhabited former island at the western edge of Karachi Harbour, now connected to the mainland by Sandspit Beach.
  - Shamspir, an inhabited island at the western edge of Karachi Harbour, to the east of Kakapir island.
  - Baba and Bhit Islands, inhabited islands in the centre of Karachi Harbour, adjacent to the Port of Karachi.
  - Manora, an inhabited island at the south of Karachi Harbour, home of one of the two main bases of the Pakistan Navy.
- Oyster Rocks – small islets to the south of Karachi, now enclosed within the Pakistan Deep Water Container Port.
- The Indus Delta archipelago:
  - Buddo Island, a barrier island to the southeast of Karachi.
  - Bundal Island, a barrier island to the southeast of Karachi.
  - Dhari Island, a tiny, uninhabited island to the southeast of Karachi.
  - Khiprianwala Island, an uninhabited island to the southeast of Karachi.
  - Khuddi Island, an uninhabited barrier island with a lighthouse, approximately 16 kilometres (9.9 mi) southeast of Bundle Island. (24°33′37″N 67°13′10″E)
  - About twelve other unnamed barrier islands stretching beyond Buddo Island to Sir Creek.

== See also ==
- Pakistan Islands Development Authority
