= Satish Ramnath Shetye =

Indian geophysicist

- Born: 25 October 1950 (age 75); Goa, India
- Education: IIT Mumbai; University of Washington
- Known for: Studies on the monsoon-driven currents along the Indian coast
- Awards: 1984 IAS Young Associate Award; 1992 Shanti Swarup Bhatnagar Prize; 2006 IIT Mumbai Distinguished Alumnus Award; 2012 MoES National award for Ocean Science and Technology
- Scientific career
- Fields: Geophysics; Oceanography
- Workplaces: National Institute of Oceanography; University of Goa

Satish Ramnath Shetye (born 1950) is an Indian geophysicist, oceanographer and a former vice chancellor of the University of Goa. He is a former director of the National Institute of Oceanography (NIO) and is known for his research on the monsoon-driven currents along the Indian coast. He is an elected fellow of all the three major Indian science academies viz. Indian National Science Academy, Indian Academy of Sciences, National Academy of Sciences, India as well as the Indian Geophysical Union. The Council of Scientific and Industrial Research, the apex agency of the Government of India for scientific research, awarded him the Shanti Swarup Bhatnagar Prize for Science and Technology, one of the highest Indian science awards for his contributions to Earth, Atmosphere, Ocean and Planetary Sciences in 1992. (Note: Long link - please select award year to see details)

== Biography ==
National Institute of Oceanography

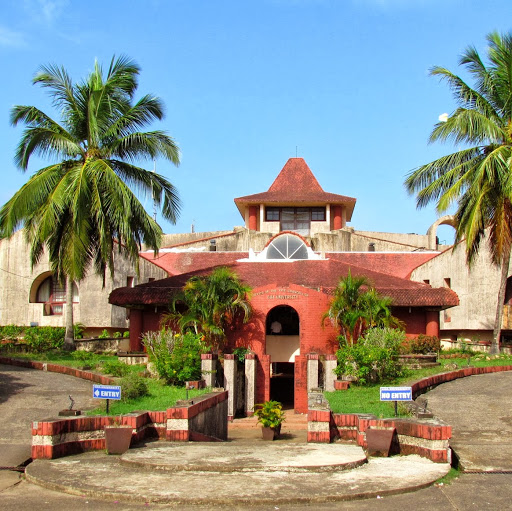
Goa University

Satish Ramnath Shetye, born on 25 October 1950 in the Indian state of Goa, did his master's degree in physics from the Indian Institute of Technology, Mumbai in 1973 and moved to the US to secure a PhD in Physical Oceanography from the University of Washington in 1982. He continued in the US to complete his post-doctoral work at the same university during 1975–82 and returned to India to join the National Institute of Oceanography (NIO) in 1982 as a research associate. He served the institute in various capacities; as Scientist-Grade C (1984–89), Scientist-Grade E-I (1989–92), Scientist-Grade E-II (1992–97) and Scientist-Grade F (1997–2004) before becoming the director in 2004. In 2012, he was appointed as the vice chancellor of the University of Goa with his tenure running till 2015, but was given an extension of one year. He retired from service in 2016, succeeded by Varun Sahni.

== Legacy ==
Shetye's researches cover the physical oceanography of the Arabian Sea, Bay of Bengal and the Indian Ocean and he is known to have undertaken several ocean expeditions in the Indian coastal waters for his studies. His work on the monsoon-driven currents along the Indian coast enhanced the understanding of the phenomena and assisted him in proposing mechanisms impacting their existence. He elucidated annual variations in the sea surface temperature in the Arabian Sea by developing a mixed-layer model, reportedly for the first time. His other studies included the coastal circulation of the entire North Indian Ocean, especially around India, the thermal fields in the North Indian Ocean and their relationship with the Indian summer monsoon, variability of sea levels along Indian coasts, dynamics of Indian estuaries and a first-time study of the hydrology of rivers feeding those estuaries. His studies have been detailed in several peer-reviewed articles; (Note: Please see Selected bibliography section) ResearchGate, an online repository of scientific articles, has listed 95 of them.

Shetye has been associated with the Earth Commission, a body constituted by the Ministry of Earth Sciences for policy formulations, and their implementation, where he sat during 2007–09. Earlier, he had been a member of the council of Indian Academy of Sciences (1998–2003), the council of the Indian National Science Academy (2005–07) and the Governing Body of the Council of Scientific and Industrial Research (2004–07). He is also a former member of the council of the Indian Institute of Science (2006) and a former editor of the Proceedings of the Indian Academy of Sciences (Earth & Planetary Sciences) and the Journal of Earth System Science. He is an incumbent member of the Peer Team of National Assessment and Accreditation Council, a national body of the University Grants Commission of India overseeing the accreditation and assessment of institutions of higher education in India. He has delivered several featured lectures and plenary addresses which include the IX Kumari L. A. Meera Memorial Lecture of 2000.

== Awards and honors ==
The Indian Academy of Sciences chose Shetye as a Young Associate in 1984; the academy would honor him again with an elected fellowship in 1992. The Council of Scientific and Industrial Research awarded him the Shanti Swarup Bhatnagar Prize, one of the highest Indian science awards, the same year. The Indian National Science Academy and the Indian Geophysical Union elected him as their fellows in 1998 and the National Academy of Sciences, India followed suit in 2000, the same year as he received the New Millennium Science Medal of the Indian Science Congress Association. He received the Distinguished Alumnus Award of the Indian Institute of Technology, Mumbai in 2006 and the Ministry of Earth Sciences awarded him the National award for Ocean Science and Technology in 2012.

== Selected bibliography ==
- Durand, F.; Shetye, S. R.; Vialard, J.; Shankar, D.; Shenoi, S. S. C.; Ethe, C.; Madec, G. (2004). "Impact of temperature inversions on SST evolution in the South-Eastern Arabian sea during the pre-summer monsoon season" (PDF). Geophysical Research Letters. 31 (1). Bibcode:2004GeoRL..31.1305D. doi:10.1029/2003GL018906.
- Aparna, M.; Shetye, S. R.; Shankar, D.; Shenoi, S. S. C.; Mehra, P.; Desai, R. G. P. (2005). "Estimating the seaward extent of sea breeze from QuikSCAT scatterometry". Geophysical Research Letters. 32 (13). Bibcode:2005GeoRL..3213601A. doi:10.1029/2005GL023107.
- Suresh, I.; Neetu, S.; Shankar, D.; Shenoi, S. S. C.; Shetye, S. R.; Sundar, D.; Shankar, R.; Nagarajan, B. (2006). "The 2004 Indian Ocean tsunami: description of the event and estimation of length of the tsunami source region based on data from Indian tide gauge". Proceedings of the Eleventh Asian Congress of Fluid Mechanics: 1–6.
- Shetye, S. R.; Suresh, I.; Shankar, D.; Sundar, D.; Jayakumar, S.; Mehra, P.; Prabhudesai, R. G.; Pednekar, P. S. (2008). "Observational evidence for remote forcing of the West India coastal current". Journal of Geophysical Research. 113 (C11). Bibcode:2008JGRC..11311001S. doi:10.1029/2008JC004874.
- Vialard, J.; Shenoi, S. S. C.; McCreary, J. P.; Shankar, D.; Durand, F.; Fernando, V.; Shetye, S. R. (2009). "Intraseasonal response of the Northern Indian Ocean coastal waveguide to the Madden-Julian Oscillation" (PDF). Geophysical Research Letters. 36 (14). Bibcode:2009GeoRL..3614606V. doi:10.1029/2009GL038450. S2CID 53573075.

== See also ==
- Indian Monsoon Current
- Hydrology
- Monsoon of South Asia
