= Malan Island =

Island in Pakistan

Malan Island, also known as Peer Ghaib, is a mud volcano located in the Arabian Sea, 3 kilometres (1.9 miles) off the coast of Balochistan province of Pakistan. It rose out of the water overnight in March 1999 and subsided below sea level within a year. A similar kind of landmass emerged in 2004 but disappeared after three months. It reappeared in 2010 and according to local fishermen was "a three-kilometre wide and 100-metre high island of mud sludge". Some fishermen reportedly tried to salvage some fishing vessels trapped in the newly-emerged island.

== See also ==
- List of volcanoes in Pakistan
- List of islands of Pakistan
