= Zalzala Koh =

Submerged island in Pakistan

Salsal Akoh
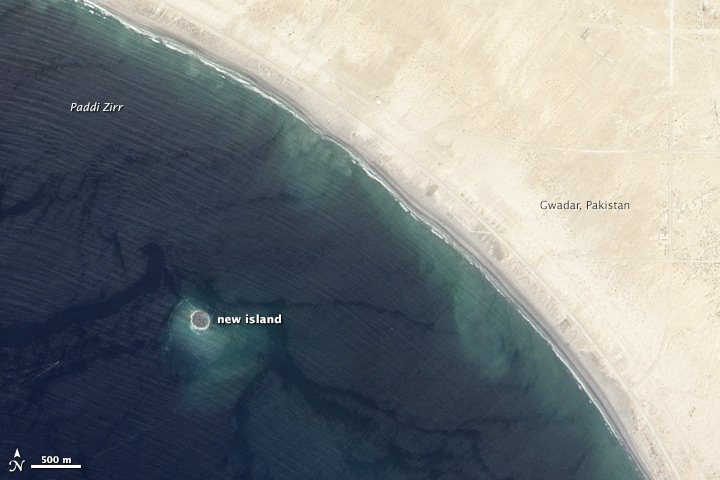
- Satellite imagery shows the island in the bay west of Gwadar.

- Location within Pakistan Location within Balochistan, Pakistan

Geography
- Coordinates: 25.182778°N 62.271111°E
- Adjacent to: Arabian Sea
- Total islands: 1
- Highest elevation: 20 m (70 ft)

Administration
- Pakistan
- Balochistan

Demographics
- Population: Uninhabited

Additional information
- First appeared 24 September 2013

Salsal Akoh (Urdu: زلزلہ کوہ, Earthquake Mountain) or Salsalani Jazeera (زلزلہ جزیرہ, Earthquake Island) was a small island off the coast of the port city of Gwadar in Balochistan province of Pakistan which appeared on 24 September 2013 just hours after a powerful earthquake in Balochistan on that day. As predicted by many geologists, the island soon started to submerge, with satellite images indicating the island had sunk 3 m (10 ft) into the sea one month after its initial appearance. By the end of 2016, the island had disappeared.

== Formation ==
Salsal Akoh may have been a mud volcano, located in the Arabian Sea offshore of Gwadar in Balochistan, Pakistan. It rose out of the water during a 7.7-magnitude earthquake that struck the same province on 24 September 2013.

Ali Rashid Tabriz, the head of Pakistan's National Institute of Oceanography, said that the surfacing of the island had been caused by an emission of methane gas on the seabed.

== Location ==
The island was visible from Pakistan's coastline and was about 2 kilometres (1.2 mi) from the shore overlooking the Hingol area. The island had a height of 15 to 20 metres (50 to 65 ft), a length of 175.7 m (576 ft), width of 160.9 m (528 ft), and a surface of 22.726 m^{2} (244.62 sq ft) (measured from satellite Pleiades). These figures were debated, however.

== Ecology ==
While the surface was lifeless, the seas around the island became a haven for fish and other life forms (including the coral Acabaria delicata), which boosted the local fishing industry.

== See also ==
- List of islands of Pakistan
- Surtsey
