= Indian Monsoon Current =

Seasonally-varying ocean current regime in the northern Indian Ocean

The Indian Monsoon Current is the seasonally varying ocean current regime found in the tropical regions of the northern Indian Ocean. During winter, the flow of the upper ocean is directed westward from near the Indonesian Archipelago to the Arabian Sea. During the summer, the direction reverses, with eastward flow extending from Somalia into the Bay of Bengal. These variations are due to changes in the wind stress associated with the Indian monsoon. The seasonally reversing open ocean currents that pass south of India are referred to as the Winter Monsoon Current and the Summer Monsoon Current (alternately, the Northeast Monsoon Current and the Southwest Monsoon Current). The cold Somali Current, which is strongly linked to the Indian monsoon, is also discussed in this article.

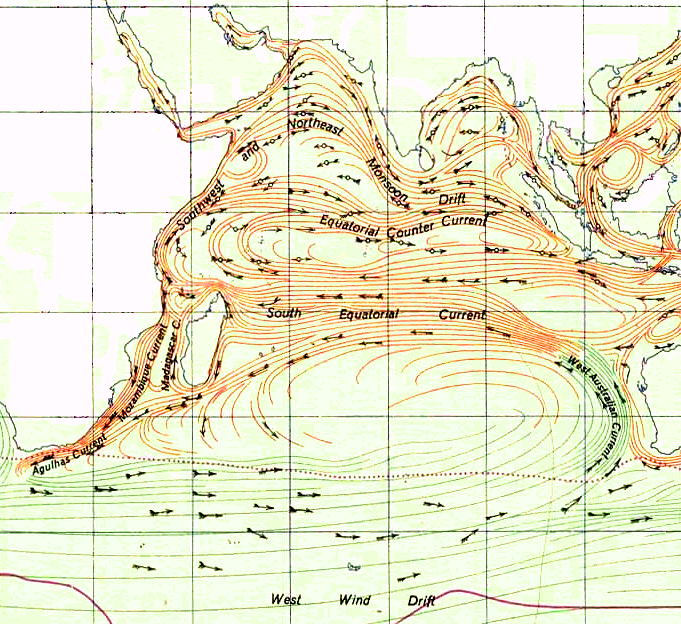
(topmost current) The Southwest and Northeast Monsoon Drift

== Overview ==
=== Historical perspective ===
Although Mariners have been aware of the existence of the Monsoon current for nearly one thousand years, a detailed understanding did not emerge until after the International Indian Ocean Expedition of the 1960s. The World Ocean Circulation Experiment of the mid 1990s permitted detailed measurement of these currents through an extensive field campaign.

=== Atmospheric forcing ===
In the northern hemisphere tropical regions of the Atlantic and Pacific oceans, surface winds blow predominantly from the northeast year round, with westward-flowing ocean currents underneath. The Indian Ocean differs from the Atlantic and Pacific in that a continental landmass forms a complete northern boundary at relatively low latitudes. Monsoonal circulations are driven by the differences in temperature between land masses and adjacent oceans. Because water has a larger thermal capacity than air, land surfaces will heat more rapidly during the summer season. The Indian monsoon consists of two phases. During the northern hemisphere winter, the cool Asian landmass contains a broad area of high pressure, whereas lower pressures prevail over the warmer Indian Ocean and hot Australian continent. This pressure pattern helps to reinforce the northeasterly trade winds. During the northern hemisphere summer, the Asian landmass (especially the Indian subcontinent) heats considerably, generating an area of low pressure to the north. Circulation about this low generates strong winds from the southwest over the Arabian Sea and along the Somali coast. These winds are enhanced by the formation of an atmospheric western boundary current created by the high terrain over eastern Africa.

A consequence of the Coriolis effect, Ekman theory explains that oceanic flow at the surface is directed at 45 degrees to the right of the wind stress in the Northern Hemisphere. Thus, winds blowing from the southwest result in eastward currents, while winds blowing from the northeast result in westward currents.

== Structure and evolution ==
=== Winter season structure ===
The Winter Monsoon Current extends from the Bay of Bengal, around India and Sri Lanka, and across the Arabian Sea at a latitude of approximately 8 degrees North. Currents flow to the southwest along the coast of Somalia to the equator.

Measurements of the strengths of these currents have been obtained from ship drift records. The Northeast Monsoon Current is westward only during the months of January through March, and is strongest in February when it reaches 50 cm s^{−1}. Estimates of westward volume transport range from 7 to 14 Sverdrups.

=== Summer season structure ===
The Somali Current, which describes the flow along the Horn of Africa from the equator to around 9 degrees north, also shifts direction seasonally with the monsoon winds. It eventually separates from the coastline, turning to the right as it enters the Arabian Sea. The Summer Monsoon Current, located between 10 and 15 North latitude in the Arabian Sea, bends around India and Sri Lanka, and enters the Bay of Bengal. The Great Whirl is a gyre located around 10 N and 55 E, and is only present during the summer season.

During the summer when the current flows toward the northeast, Ekman transport (to the right of the flow in the Northern Hemisphere) is offshore, transporting warmer waters deeper into the Arabian sea, and permitting upwelling of cooler waters along the coast. This sea surface temperature pattern (cooler waters west of warmer waters) reinforces the northward current through geostrophic flow. The Southwest Monsoon Current is eastward from April through November, and reaches a peak intensity of 30 cm s^{−1} during the summer months. During a 1995 field campaign, the Somali current was measured to transport 37 +/- 5 Sv during mid-September.

=== Evolution ===
The rapid initiation of seasonal currents (over the time period of several weeks) can be explained theoretically in terms of linear theory with a Rossby wave response. The Monsoon Current can also be viewed in terms of local forcing processes that act in concert to create the mature, basin-wide system. The evolution of these currents have been reproduced in dynamical models of the ocean-atmosphere system.

== See also ==
- Asian brown cloud
- Monsoon of South Asia
- Ocean current
- Ocean gyre
- Physical oceanography
