= Khiprianwala Island =

Pakistani island

Khiprianwala
Native name: کھپڑیانوالہ
- Interactive map of Khiprianwala

Geography
- Location: Arabian Sea, Ibrahim Hyderi, Karachi, Sindh
- Coordinates: 24°46′26″N 67°11′49″E
- Archipelago: Indus Delta
- Adjacent to: Korangi Creek
- Area: 13 km^{2} (5.0 sq mi)
- Highest elevation: 1 m (3 ft)

Administration
- Pakistan

Demographics
- Population: Uninhabited

Khiprianwala Island (Urdu: جزیرہ خپریانوالہ; Sindhi: ڪپريانوالا ٻيٽ) is an island located in the Arabian Sea off the coast of Karachi, Sindh, Pakistan.

The island lies south of Korangi and the fishing village of Ibrahim Hyderi, bordering Bundal and Buddo Islands at the fringes of the Indus River Delta. Khiprianwala exhibits sparse mangrove vegetation, predominantly Avicennia marina, alongside mud banks and swamps typical of the tropical coastal ecosystem.

Efforts are being made to protect the island as its natural environment is increasingly disturbed and exploited.

== See also ==
- List of islands of Pakistan
