= Arabian Sea =

Sea of the northern Indian Ocean

- بَحرُ ٱلْعَرَبْ (Arabic)
- Interactive map of Arabian Sea
- The Arabian Sea as defined by the International Hydrographic Organization
- Location: East Africa, West Asia and South Asia
- Coordinates: 14°N 65°E
- Type: Sea
- Part of: Indian Ocean
Basin countries
- India
- Iran
- Maldives
- Oman
- Pakistan
- Seychelles
- Somalia
- Sri Lanka
- Yemen
- Max. width: 2,400 km (1,500 mi)
- Surface area: 3,862,000 km^{2} (1,491,000 sq mi) (3,600,000–4,600,000 km^{2} in various sources)
- Max. depth: 4,652 m (15,262 ft)
- Islands: Astola island, Basavaraj Durga Island, Bundal Island, Charna Island, Clifton Oyster Rocks, Khiprianwala Island, Lakshadweep, Malan Island, Manora Island, Masirah Island, Piram Island, Pirotan, Shams Pir, Socotra Archipelago

The Arabian Sea (Arabic: بَحرُ ٱلْعَرَبْ, romanized: baḥr al-ʿarab) is a region of sea in the northern Indian Ocean, bounded on the west by the Arabian Peninsula, Gulf of Aden and Guardafui Channel, on the northwest by Gulf of Oman and Iran, on the north by Pakistan, on the east by India, and on the southeast by the Laccadive Sea and the Maldives, and on the southwest by Somalia. Its total area is 3,862,000 km^{2} (1,491,000 sq mi) and its maximum depth is 5,395 meters (17,700 feet). The Gulf of Aden in the west connects the Arabian Sea to the Red Sea through the strait of Bab-el-Mandeb, and the Gulf of Oman is in the northwest, connecting it to the Persian Gulf. It is dominated in its south and center by the Arabian Basin, an expansive, relatively flat stretch of seabed reaching depths exceeding 4500 meters in some areas. Most islands and seamounts within the sea are located along its coastal fringes, close to major landmasses.

The straits of Hormuz and Bab-el Mandeb on the northwestern and western ends of the Arabian Sea have historically served as gateways connecting the kingdoms and polities of the Eastern and Western limits of the Old World since the establishment of the region's first international trade networks in the 3rd millennium BC. This produced countless interdependent nodes of regional commerce all operating in tandem with one another, linking merchants in the Mediterranean with their counterparts in the Near East, who thereafter linked to Persia and East Africa, on to India, Southern Africa, Southeast Asia, East Asia, and the Malay Archipelago. This combined activity facilitated the widespread diffusion of concepts, peoples, philosophies, technologies, religions, specie, and various domesticate variants of crops and livestock across the Old World over millennia, most profoundly from and within the confines of the Indian Ocean and Near Eastern worlds.

Trade was historically restricted by the monsoon winds and the currents produced by their interaction with the Indian Ocean Warm Pool. In mid-summer, strong winds carry warm air and moisture northeastwards from the African interior and Indian Ocean, resulting in heavy rains on the northeast shoreline of the Arabian basin, and dry conditions in the Horn of Africa and Arabian Peninsula, though both have seen dramatic fluctuations in their pattern in recent years in favor of more intensive rainfall. Cold, shallow, dry, southwesterly winds from the Karakoram and Himalayas would otherwise predominate in winter and spring.

The Arabian Sea forms the predominance of the Arabian Sea large marine ecosystem, a marine environment stretching from the Laccadive to the Red Sea and the Persian Gulf that is considered to be one of the most, if not the most biologically productive regions on the planet. The region is bounded by the Carlsberg Ridge in the Sea's south. It has been placed under significant strain in recent decades, leading to the listing of a significant number of endangered and critically endangered marine and terrestrial species, owed in large part to overfishing, unintended bycatch, industrial and residential development, pollution, global heating, and accelerating eutrophication in coastal waters.

Notable seaports in the modern era include the Jawaharlal Nehru and Mormugao Ports in India, the Ports of Karachi, Qasim, and Gwadar in Pakistan, Chabahar Port in Iran, and the Port of Salalah in Oman. Among the largest islands in the Arabian Sea are Socotra (Yemen), Masirah (Oman), and Astola (Pakistan). The countries with coastlines on the Arabian Sea are Yemen, Oman, Pakistan, Iran, India and the westernmost islands of the Maldive and Laccadive Archipelagos.

== Geography ==
The Arabian Sea's surface area is about 3,862,000 km^{2} (1,491,130 sq mi). The maximum width of the sea is approximately 2,400 km (1,490 mi), and its maximum depth is 5,395 metres (17,700 ft). The largest river flowing into the sea is the Indus.

The sea has two main arms, the Gulf of Aden in the southwest, connecting it with the Red Sea through the strait of Bab-el-Mandeb; and the Gulf of Oman to the northwest, connecting it with the Persian Gulf. It also bounds the gulfs of Khambhat and Kutch on the Indian Coast, and the Laccadive Sea off the coast of southern India.

=== Limits ===
The only difference between the National Oceanic and Atmospheric Administration (NOAA) and International Hydrographic Organization (IHO) demarcations of the Arabian Sea is their determination of the sea's limit on its eastern border with India, disputing whether that be Devgad Island or Sadashivgad Village in Karnataka. According to NOAA, the demarcation of the sea is as follows:

On the North and the East: From Cape Jiwani in Pakistan (25°1′10″N 61°44′15″E) eastward and southward, along the coasts of Pakistan and India, to Devgad Island (14°49′10″N 74°3′30″E), off the western coast of India; thence a line joining Devgad Island southwestward to Cora Divh (13°42′0″N 72°10′0″E) and thence southward, along the western side of the Lakshadweep and Maldives Islands, to the southern extremity of Addu Atoll (0°42′0″S 73°9′30″E)

[...]

On the South: A line joining the southern extremity of Addu Atoll northwestward to Cape Hafun (10°26′0″N 51°25′0″E) in Somalia.

[...]

On the West: From Cape Hafun northward, along the coast of Somalia, to Cape Asir [Guardafui] (11°50′0″N 51°17′0″E); thence a line joining Cape Asir northeastward to Cape Fartak (15°38′0″N 52°13′30″E) in Southern Yemen (the common limit with the Gulf of Aden [...] ), thence from Cape Fartak [...] northeastward, along the coasts of Southern Yemen and Oman, to Cape Al Hadd (22°32′0″N 59°47′30″E), in Oman; and thence a line joining Cape Al Hadd [...] northeastward to Cape Jiwani (25°1′10″N 61°44′15″E), in Pakistan (the common limit with the Gulf of Oman [...])

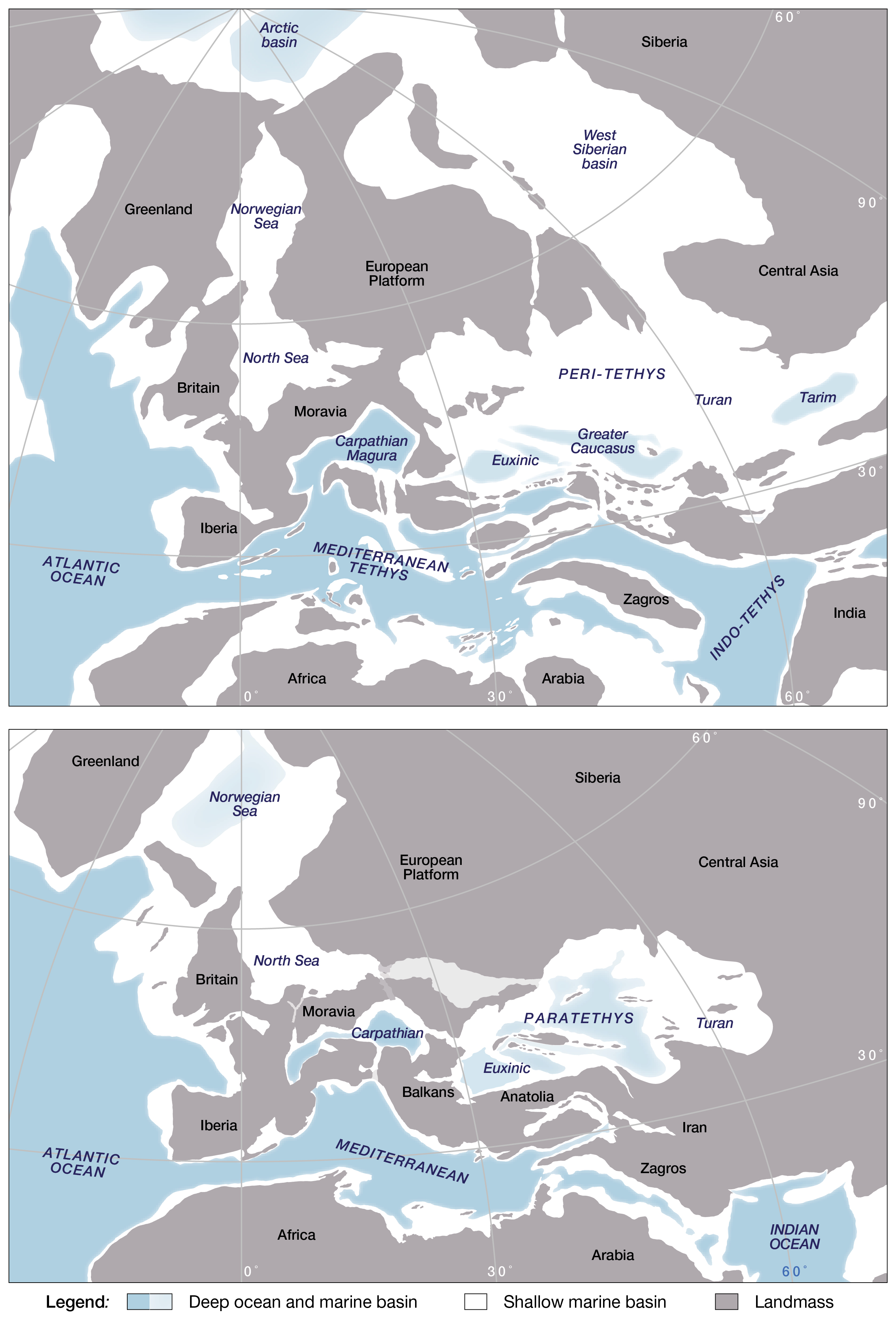
Reorganization of the Eurasian, African, and Indian landmasses during the Paleogene, with the proto-Arabian Sea (Indo Tethys) at bottom right

=== Geological history ===
The Tethys Ocean (/ˈtiːθɪs, ˈtɛ-/ TEETH-iss, TETH-; Greek: Τηθύς Tēthús), also called the Tethys Sea or the Neo-Tethys, was a prehistoric ocean during much of the Mesozoic Era and early-mid Cenozoic Era. It was the predecessor to the modern Indian Ocean, the Mediterranean Sea, and the Eurasian inland marine basins (primarily represented today by the Black Sea and Caspian Sea).

Throughout the Cenozoic (66 million years to the dawn of the Neogene, 23 Mya), the connections between the Atlantic and Indian Oceans across the Tethys were eventually closed off in what is now the Middle East during the Miocene, as a consequence of the northern migration of Africa/Arabia and global sea levels falling due to the concurrent formation of the Antarctic Ice Sheet. This decoupling occurred in two steps, first around 20 Mya and another around 14 Mya. The complete closure of the Tethys led to a global reorganization of currents, and is what is thought to have allowed for upwelling in the Arabian Sea and led to the establishment of the modern South Asian Monsoon. It also caused major modifications to the functioning of the AMOC and ACC.

=== Hydrography ===
In 1959, the International Indian Ocean Expedition was among the first groups to conduct hydrographic surveys in the Arabian Sea. Additionally, "significant bathymetric surveys were also conducted by the Soviet Union during the 1960s".

==== The Arabian Basin ====
The southern limits of the Sea are dominated by the Arabian Basin, which reaches depths of over 4,500 metres (14,764 ft), and which maintains a relatively constant depth throughout. The Carlsberg Ridge flanks the southern edge of the basin.

The deepest parts of the Arabian Sea sit in the Alula-Fartak Trough on its western border with the Gulf of Aden. The trough, which reaches depths of over 5,360 metres (17,585 ft), runs through both bodies. The deepest known point in the Arabian Sea sits at a depth of 5,395 metres (17,700 ft). Other significant deep points sit within the Arabian Basin, including a 5,358 m (17,579 ft) deep point off the northern limit of Calrsberg Ridge.

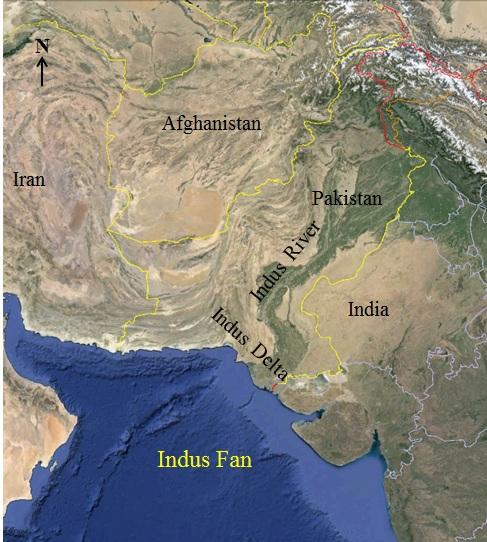
(Clockwise along the coast from the left) Map of the Gulf of Oman, Makran Coast, Indus Delta, western Indo-Gangetic Plain, Indus Fan, and Arabian Basin

===== The shelf line and the Indus Fan =====
The continental shelf line is relatively narrow along the Makran, Arabian, and East African coastlines; conversely, its extends greatly from the coast of much of the Indian subcontinent, reaching distances exceeding 300 km (190 mi) in some places. The structure of the shelf line played a significant role in the creation of the Indus Fan, which was flooded and submerged along with the rest of the Indian coast at the end of the Last Glacial Maximum (LGM).

The Indus Fan, a sedimentation cluster created by the depositional flow of the Indus River, is the second largest fan system in the world. It spreads out from its core layer at the mouth of the Indus Canyon, a thin, steep sloped extension of the river carved into the seabed up to the Sindhi continental shelf line. The Canyon primarily formed prior to the Last Glacial Maximum (LGM), though it is believed to have been initially formed during the Last Interglacial, when sea levels were relatively high, and turbidity significant in the region at the mouth of the Indus up to the edge of the continental shelf at 135 metres (443 ft) below sea level.

During the LGM, the shelf sat above sea level and the river thus extended approximately 130 kilometres (81 mi) further before emptying into the Arabian Sea. What would become the Indus Canyon experienced "maximum erosion and funneled turbidity currents to the aggradational channel-levee system on the Indus Fan" during this period, meaning that the shelf line was intensively carved out along the riverbank's exit channels. Highly pressurized, directionally uniform, and sediment-filled discharge exiting at the mouth of the river which produced the pronounced canyon, and the swept out remains of the shelf line that once filled it thereafter built up at the border between the continental slope and basin floor along the edges of the submarine mouth of the river system. As the shelf flooded at the beginning of the Holocene, delta front sediments rose and resettled along the "innermost shelf", producing the pronounced underwater canyon and enclosing sedimentary ridge seen today.

==== Other features ====
The Falaj Valley, discovered in 2009 by French surveyors, is an underwater valley off the eastern coast of Ash Sharqiyah Region in Oman. It is 81 kilometers wide, with a maximum depth of 3,097 metres (1.924 mi) and a relief of 1,151 m (3,776 ft), extending out roughly 75 km (47 mi) from the shelfline. It is named for the Falaj Irrigation System, a network of conduits, canals, and drainage systems built expansively across eastern Oman in the 5th century to equitably provision and maintain water supplies as groundwater sources depleted in that era.

===== Owen Fracture Zone =====
The De Covilhăo Trough, discovered in 1930 and named for 15th century Portuguese explorer Pero de Covilhăo, reaches depths exceeding 4,400 metres (14,436 ft). It and the Murray Ridge on its western border separate the Indus Fan from the Oman Abyssal Plain, which leads on into the Gulf of Oman. The Murray Ridge arguably acts as an extension of the Owen fracture zone, an extensive bathymetric ridge running from the northwestern to southwestern Arabian Sea along a line roughly parallel to the southern Arabian and eastern Somalian coastlines, stretching from the central Makran coast to a point roughly 500 kilometres (310 mi) east of the central Somalian coastline. The fracture zone is the intersection point between the Indian and Arabian plates. The zone is characterized by steep slopes reaching heights of nearly 2,000 metres (6,600 ft) relative to the surrounding seabed. The fracture zone has acted as a natural barrier preventing sedimentation from the Indus Fan from extending out into the Oman Basin.

===== Oceanic fronts and boundaries =====
The Arabian Sea is bounded on its southwest by the Carlsberg Ridge and Horn of Africa, on its west by the Gulf of Aden, on its northwest by eastern Yemen, Oman, and the easternmost point of Iran, on its north by Pakistan and Western India, and on its southeast by the Laccadive Sea and the westernmost islands of Lakshadweep and the Maldives. It consists of 7 ecological oceanic fronts, with the typical and most prominent upwelling fronts resting along the coasts of India and Pakistan. The 4 fronts which sit in or within the immediate environs of the Arabian Sea are delineated as follows:

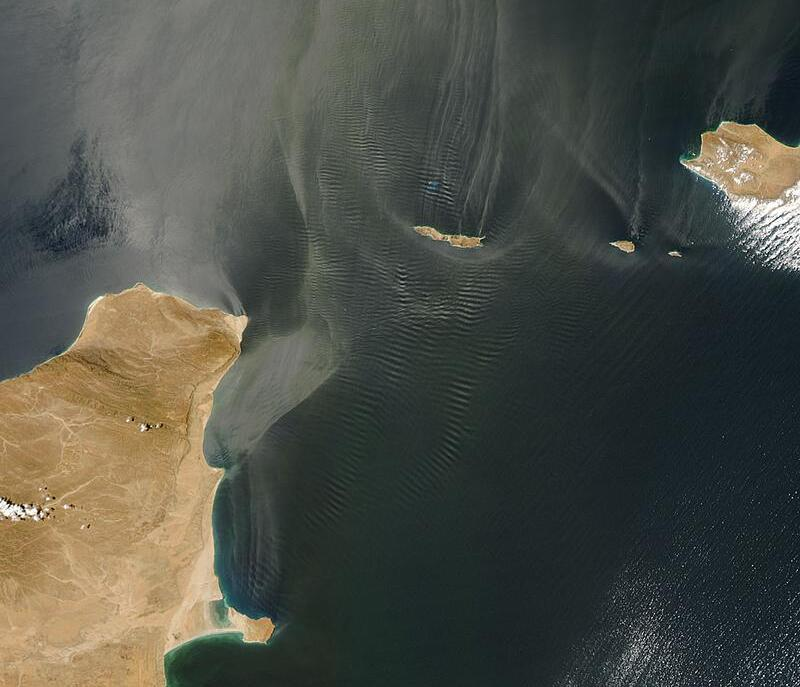
Internal waves off the east coast of Somalia

- The Gulf of Aden Front (GAF): Forming a concave semicircle running from Burua in Somalia (11°28′45.519″N 49°41′23.6934″E) to the village of Khird in Yemen, 5–10 miles east of Al-Shihr. It's sagitta is roughly 30–40 kilometres (19–25 mi).
- The Oman Coastal Front (OCF): Shielding the coastline from Cape Fartak (15°37′59.4″N 52°13′31.5″E) to Masirah Island (20°5′56.7″N 58°36′56″E).
- The Gulf of Oman Front (GOF): Bordering the coastlines of Iran and the Arabian Sea to produce a three-sided wall around the Oman Abyssal Plain, running from Ras al Hadd to a point at the plain's northwestern limit (25°17′39″N 57°5′0″E) near the entrance to the Strait of Hormuz. The area of the Iranian Coast moving east contained within the shield is the principal stretch of coastline contained within this hydrological environment. That mass is then separated on the east by a convex shield stretching roughly from the Ziyarat Peninsula (25°20′32.7″N 59°53′36.5″E) back to Ras al Hadd, with a sagitta of roughly 40–50 km (25–31 mi).
- The West Indian Shelf-Slope Fronts (WISSF), stretching along the western Indian coastline, additionally containing two separate and hydrologically distinct regions with different outflow, tidal, and sedimentary properties from the wider frontier:
  - The Indian Estuarine Front (IEF): Forming a relatively flat shield stretching from Ras Malan (25°18′55.4″N 65°13′12.6″E) in Pakistan to the northwestern tip of the Kathiawar Peninsula in India; it encompasses the immediate drainage channels of the Indus River and surrounding source rivers.
  - The West Indian Mid-Shelf Front (WIMSF): Encompassing the watershed of the Gulf of Khambat.

Fronts are largely seasonal, and can be pronounced, exceeding a 5 °C (9 °F) differential in some places. The Arabian Sea LME ultimately ends on a line stretching northwest from 200 km (120 mi) south of Cape Comorin in India to midway between Ras Hafun and Cape Guardafui on the eastern Somalian coast, it extends several hundred kilometers north of the Carlsberg Ridge across most of its expanse, only coming within a few hundred kilometers of the uplift zone upon reaching the East African shelf line.

====== Border and basin countries ======
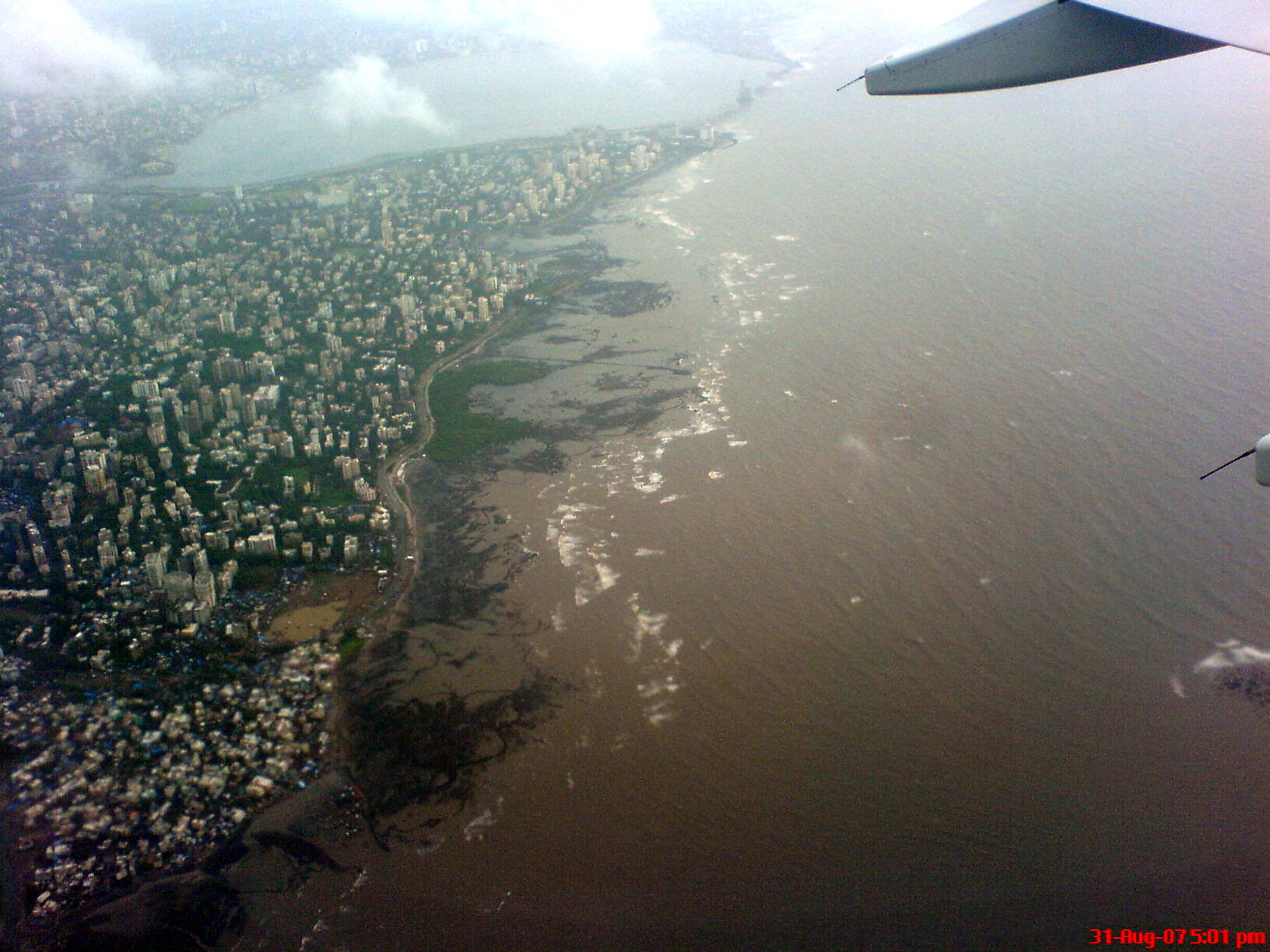
Aerial view of Bombay/Mumbai Arabian Sea coastline

Coastline of border and basin countries:

1. India – 2,500 kilometres (1,600 mi)
2. Pakistan – 1,050 kilometres (650 mi)
3. Iran (Makran Coast) – ~ 130 kilometres (81 mi) (No coastline on the Arabian Sea according to IHO delineations)
4. Maldives - West coast of westernmost islands (contained by Laccadive Sea)
5. Oman (Excluding Gulf of Oman) - ~ 720 kilometres (450 mi)
6. Yemen (Including Gulf of Aden) – ~ 1,640 kilometres (1,020 mi)
7. Somalia (Cape Guardafui to Ras Hafun) – ~ 200 kilometres (120 mi)

==== Seamounts ====
Prominent sea mounts off the Indian west coast include the Raman and Panikkar Seamounts, named for Nobel Laureate in Physics Sir Chandrasekara Venkata Raman, and N. K. Panikkar, founder of the Indian National Oceanographic Institute, respectively.

Sind'Bad Seamount, named for the mythical sailor of Arab and Persian literary tradition, and Zheng He Seamount, named for the Chinese admiral and explorer who charted the Indian Ocean and Arabian Sea for the Ming dynasty in the 15th century, are some notable seamounts in the western Arabian Sea.

The Sadko Seamount is the only seamount in the central Arabian Basin, and the only one known to be present in the west as far south as the Carlsberg Ridge. It is named for Sadko, a hero of Russian folklore, who sinks to the bottom of the Indian Ocean after angering Tsar Morskoi, the King of the Sea.

=== Islands ===
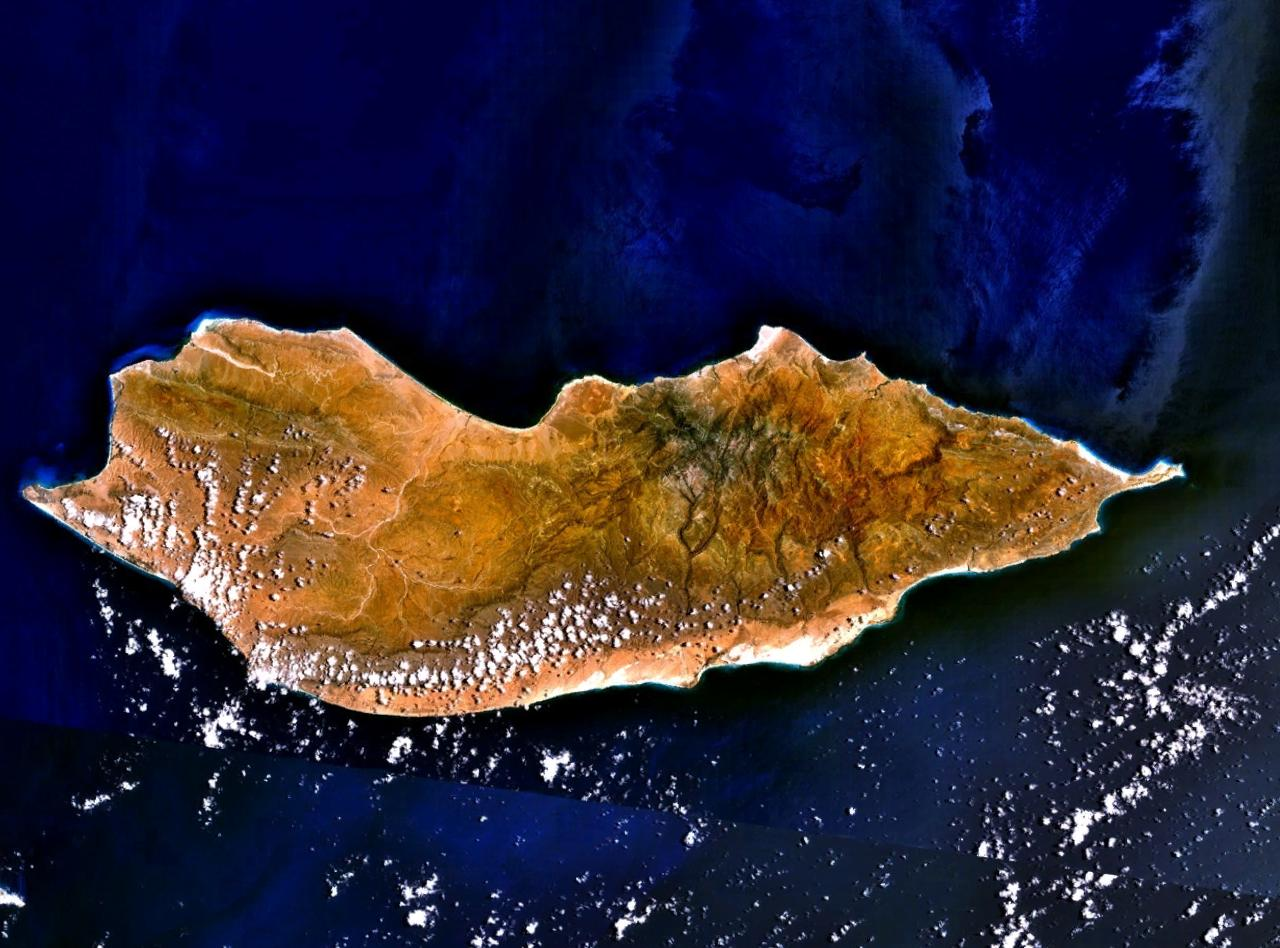
Landsat view of Socotra, an island of Yemen

There are several islands in the Arabian Sea, all off the coast of major landmasses, with none at the sea's center. The most notable islands include the Socotra Archipelago, Masirah, and Astola, as well as the Lakshadweep and Maldives islands off the coast of India, contained within the Laccadive Sea.

Astola Island, also known as Jezira Haft Talar in Balochi, or 'Island of the Seven Hills', is a small, uninhabited island in the northern tip of the Arabian Sea in Pakistan's territorial waters. It is a nesting ground for several rare species, include hawksbill and green sea turtles.

Zalzala Koh off the coast of Pakistan only existed for a few years. The mud island was formed after the 2013 Balochistan earthquakes, but by 2016 had been completely submerged by the sea. The volcanic Error, Qalhat, and Wadia Guyots–southeast of the Socotra archipelago, east of the coast of Oman, and west off the coast of Karnataka, respectively–similarly sat above sea level at some point in their history.

Socotra, also spelled Soqotra, is the sea's largest island, part of an archipelago of four islands under Yemeni jurisdiction. It lies some 240 km (150 mi) east of the Horn of Africa and 380 km (240 mi) south of the Arabian Peninsula. The entire island is a UNESCO World Heritage Site, on account of its exceptional biodiversity, with "37% of Socotra’s 825 plant species, 90% of its reptile species and 95% of its land snail species [not occurring] anywhere else in the world". Many of these species are threatened or endangered.

Masirah and the five Khuriya Muriya Islands lie off the southeastern coast of Oman.

== Climate and environment ==
=== Climate ===
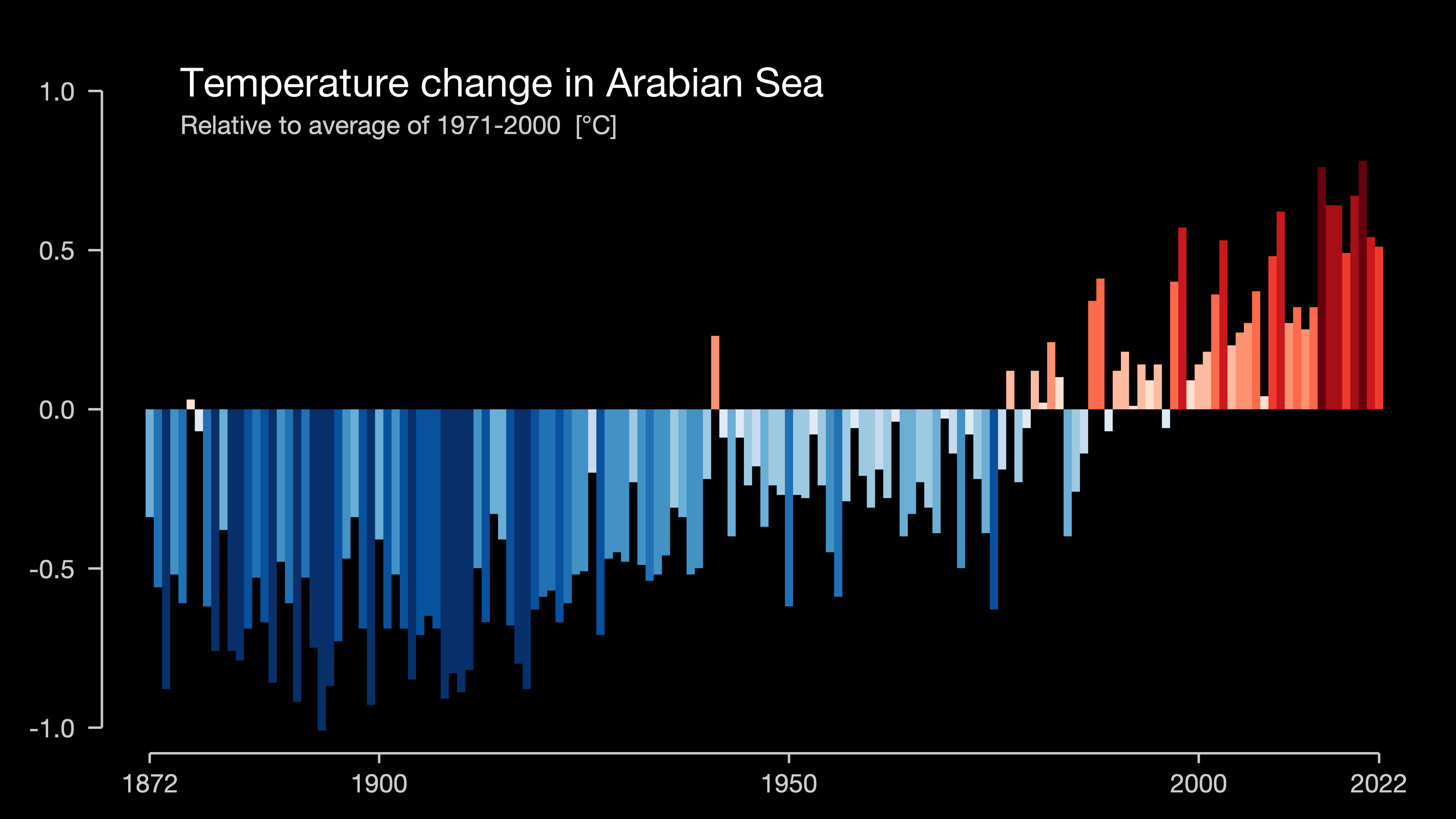
Temperature change in the Arabian Sea, Indian Ocean from 1872 to 2022, showing a marked increase in average temperatures over that period

The Arabian Sea experiences a monsoonal climate. Temperature patterns, precipitation levels, and recorded humidity levels are typically dependent upon the time of year and conditions to the sea's south and southwest. Despite the intensive rains which inundate the eastern edge of the basin annually, very little precipitation is witnessed on the sea's western shoreline, causing the region to constitute one of the driest seascapes on the planet.

==== Temperatures and Arabian Sea warming ====
Historically, minimum air temperatures of about 24 to 25 °C (75 to 77 °F) occurred between January and February, typically only exceeding 28 °C (82 °F) (via extension of the Indo-Pacific Warm Pool) between June and November. Most extreme surface temperatures typically occurred in the Persian Gulf; however, vacillating temperature extremes and dramatic meteorological events have become far more commonplace in recent years, producing significant fluctuations in this pattern.

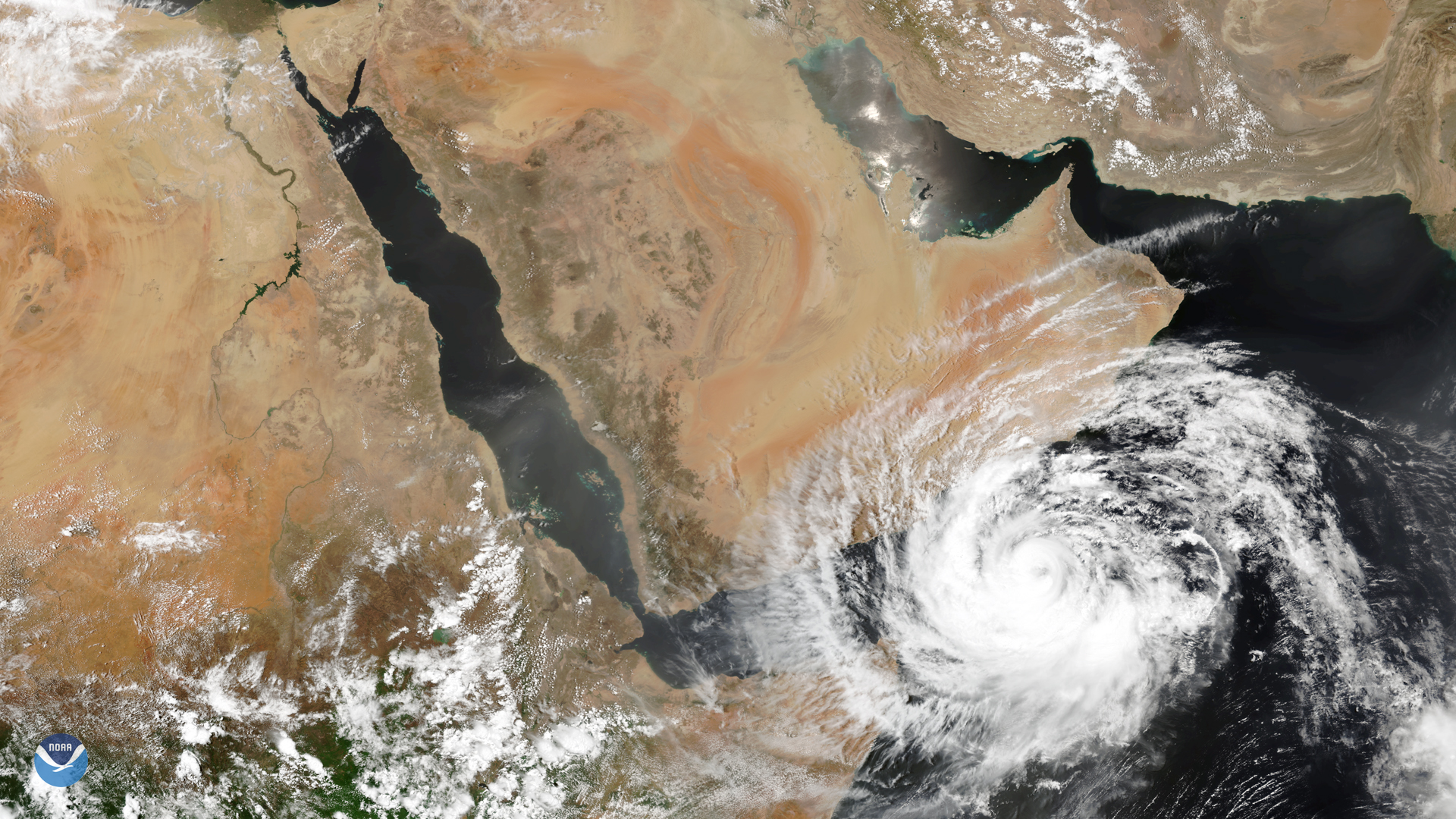
Tropical Storm Mekunu moving towards the Arabian Peninsula in 2018

Studies reviewing data up to the turn of the 3rd millennium indicate that sea surface temperature (SST) normals have increased by roughly 0.84 °C (~1.3–1.5 °F) on average over the past 100 years. The sea's all time minimum temperature occurred in 1975, its all-time maximum in 1998. Rapid warming from 1985 to 1987 was responsible for the prolonged pattern of increasingly warm air seen in the region today. Recent studies by the Indian Institute of Tropical Meteorology confirmed that the Arabian Sea is warming monotonously. Experts have consistently pointed to climate change and global and regional heating as playing a principal role in this trend.

The intensification and northward shift of the summer monsoon low-level jet over the Arabian Sea from 1979 to 2015 has led to increased upper ocean heat content, on account of enhanced downwelling and reduced southward heat transport. In much of the southeast Arabian Sea, the annual period during which Sea surface temperature normals exceeded 28 °C (82 °F) increased in length by roughly a month on average between 1982 and 2020. Indian oceanographers began recording SSTs exceeding 32 °C (90 °F) in localized areas of the same region as early as 2007. Moreover, 2024 stood as the hottest year in the Middle East on record, contributing to warming waters.

==== The monsoon seasons ====
Starting in mid to late summer, strong southwesterly winds blowing from the Horn of Africa and western Indian Ocean carry warm, moist air northeastwards, contributing to strong oceanic forcing across the Arabian Basin. This forcing produces the prototypical rainy season of the South Asian monsoon cycle, alongside numerous additional annual environmental and meteorological shifts throughout the region. The winds produced during the southwest monsoon over the Arabian Sea, often referred to as the Findlater Jet, are heavily uniform northeastwards, and the strongest witnessed anywhere outside the Southern Ocean. The southwest monsoon is preceded by the Arabian Sea Mini Warm Pool (ASMWP), a period of 2 to 3 months prior to the beginning of the summer monsoon wherein SST averages exceeding 30 °C (86 °F) persist across much of southeastern basin. This gradual heating is reversed by mid-winter, when shallow, northeasterly winds carrying cool, dry air from the Hindu-Kush and Himalayas prevail.

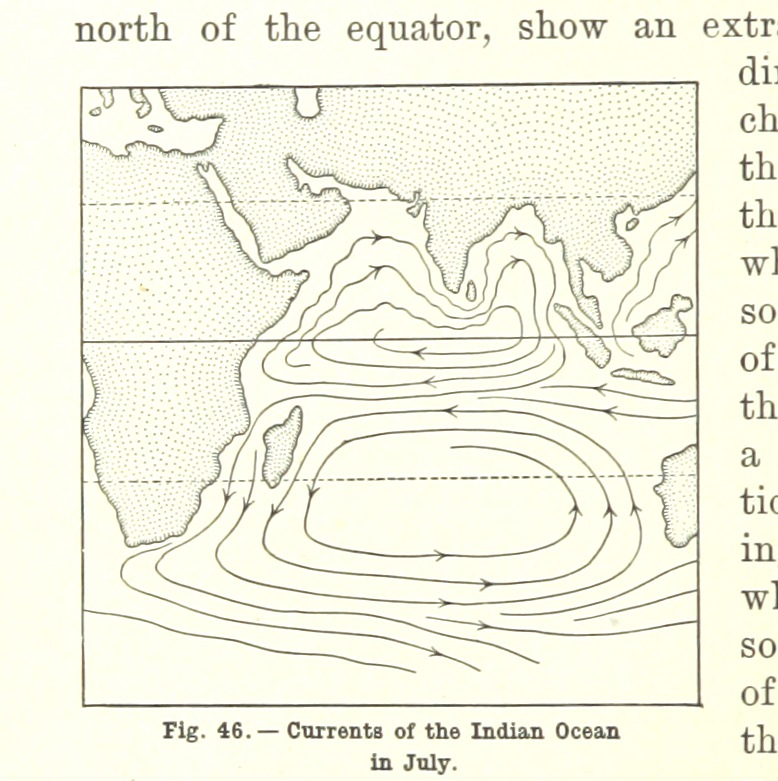
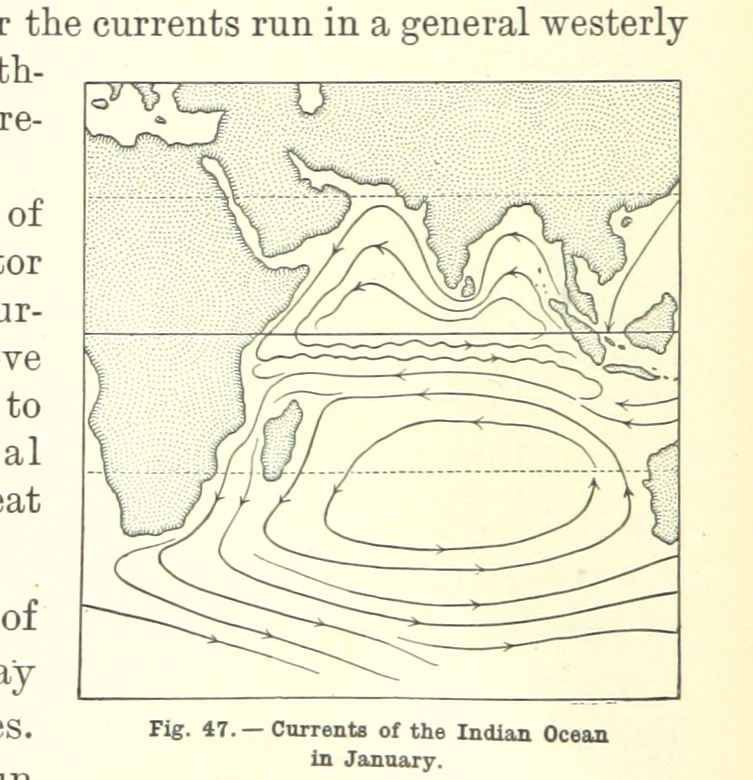
Prevailing currents of the Arabian Sea (top left) during the summer (left) and winter (right) monsoons

The summer monsoon has begun to lengthen and accelerate in recent decades, with extreme rainy seasons repeatedly striking the Persian Gulf and South Asia since the start of the 2020s. It has become more erratic as well, resulting in heavy, violent, short-lived systems striking randomly and unpredictably within the basin. These systems and other extreme climactic fluctuations have killed thousands across large parts of Asia.

=== Coastal and marine ecosystems ===
The Arabian Sea supports a diverse array of coastal and marine species, resulting from the extreme variability in climate and temperature seen within the basin, and the relative geographic isolation of its islands and the landmasses it borders from one another, producing distinct climactic and ecological conditions in different regions. Marine productivity in the Arabian Sea is highly variable throughout the year on account of the substantial difference in oceanic upwelling that takes place between different monsoonal regimes. The upwelling during the summer monsoon season, however, is the most intense to occur annually of any region on the planet.

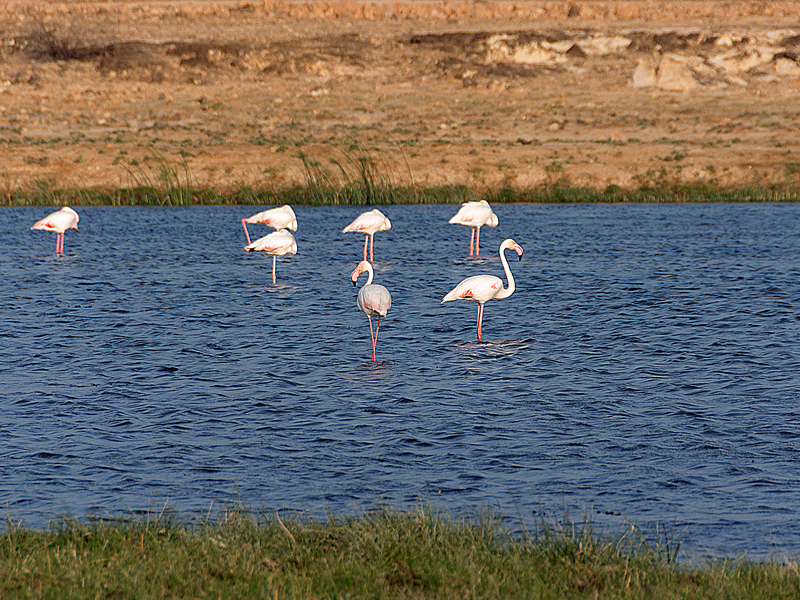
Flamingoes aggregating at the Khor Rori sandbar in southern coastal Oman

==== The Arabian Sea LME ====
The Arabian Sea large marine ecosystem (LME) is an ecological region encompassing an area of approximately 3,900,000 km^{2} (1,500,000 sq mi) within the sea, Gulf of Aden, and Gulf of Oman, principally below the continental shelf line, representing some coastal populations, and all populations of non-coastal marine life within the Arabian Basin. Though the Persian Gulf is included in this region as well, it may be excluded from certain analyses and accounts of the ecosystem, owing to the significant difference between its physical and hydrographic characteristics and those of the larger basin. In either case, the Arabian Sea LME remains one of the most ecologically productive regions on the planet, owing to the vast store of nutrients driven up to the sea's surface each year by intense oceanic upwelling in the fall and summer months.

The Arabian Sea LME is known to contain at least 330 species of coral, 550 species of mollusk, 200 species of crab, 24 species of marine mammal, and more than 1,200 species of fish. A significant number of marine mammals inhabiting the region are protected or listed as threatened by various international authorities. Among them are the blue whale, humpback whale (Stock D), killer whale, pygmy killer whale, finless porpoise, as well as various species of sperm whale and dolphin. As of 2026, 18 coastal regions in the Arabian Sea are listed by the Marine Mammals Protected Areas Task Force (MMPATF) as important marine mammal areas (IMMAs).

Despite its productivity, coastal pelagic fish populations in the region are relatively sparse, believed to be a result of unfavorable feeding conditions that discourage spawning of larvae. These conditions, in turn, are caused by incorrect mixing of the surface layer which results from the highly intense summer monsoon and the strong, current producing winds it creates in the sea's north and west.

===== Exploited marine populations =====
Fish and other marine species are widely exploited across the Arabian Sea LME, with collapsed and overexploited stocks of the former representing over 50% of ecosystem-wide populations as of 2004. In the modern era, few developing stocks are exploited, largely because few developing stocks exist; the vast majority of landings, rather, come from fully or over-exploited stocks. Over 80% of catch volume comes from fully exploited stocks, in spite of substantial evidence showing that fish stocks across the ecosystem are rapidly depleting. Primary production requirements to support reported landings in the Arabian Sea sat at roughly 20% of total recorded primary production in the mid-1990s, reaching a peak of ~21–22% in 1995, before ultimately falling to roughly 17% by 2010. The peak, nonetheless, represents more than a quadrupling from the 1950 ratio. In this period, India, Pakistan, and Iran had the largest ecological footprints in the ecosystem, with those three, the United Arab Emirates, and France accounting for more than 85% of total exploitation in the LME in 2010.

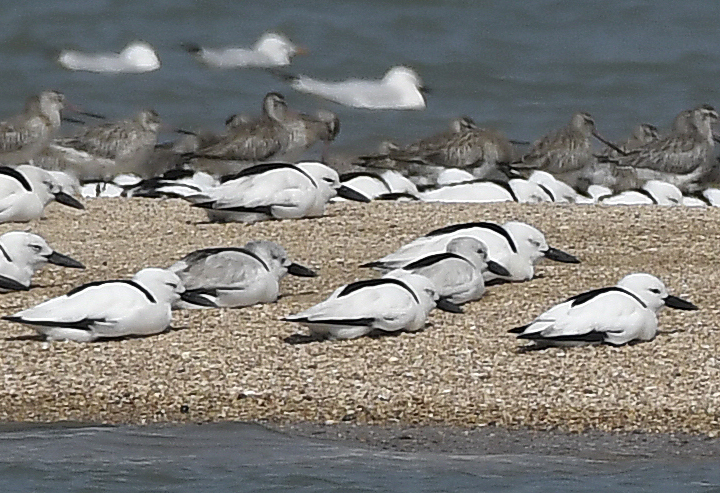
Crab Plovers congregating at Jamnagar, Gujarat

The mean trophic level of reported landings across countries was ~3.475 in 2010, down from 3.75 in 1950, but up from a local minimum of ~3.275 in 1964. The region's Fish-in-Balance Index (FiB) has risen steadily over time, up to 1.0 in 2010 from its base point in 1950. This is consistent with the gradual extension and widening of fishing operations outwards from the shoreline during that period to exploit populations of larger oceanic pelagic fish. Overexploitation in the Arabian LME has been assessed by researchers from the University of Rhode Island to be moderate, but increasing steadily, though exploitation of some species has decreased dramatically in recent years

Substantial bycatch and overexploitation has placed significant pressure on demersal fish species in the Arabian. This and the decline of other species has resulted in part from the use of vessels exceeding maximum sustainable yield (MSY) limits, as well as the destructive practices of commercial and artisanal shrimp trawlers. As the Rhode Island researchers note, "[v]arious types of destructive fishing gear, including shrimp trawl nets and explosives, have contributed to localised fish population declines and habitat degradation in the region". Overexploitation of shrimp and finfish in the Persian Gulf by Saudi-Kuwaiti ventures, and that of high value fish in the Gulf of Oman by Omani fishermen has led to declining catch rates of preferred species of both in the Arabian LME from the turn of the millennium onward.

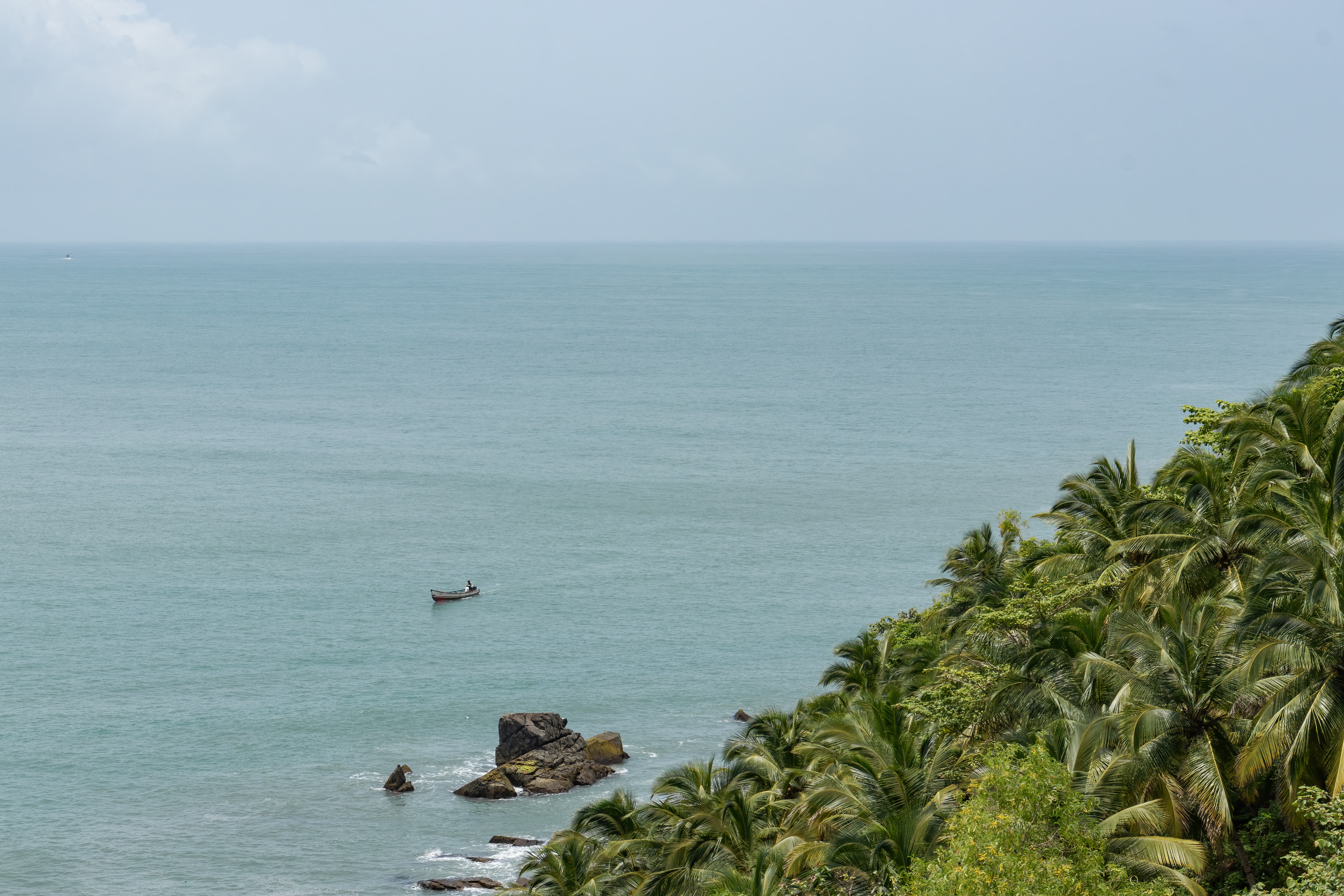
A boat on the Arabian Sea coast seen from Cabo de Rama Fort

Recreational fishing can have similar impacts on certain populations; particularly given the preference for larger catches, though recreational fishermen have been shown to follow safety procedure to a greater degree than private enterprise; assuming compliance with relevant maritime legislation, the associated injury and mortality risks involved with catch and release practices still present additional hazards to large marine species in the Arabian LME, particularly given the fact that many such fishermen venture into already overexploited waters, in spite of restrictions. Non-target bycatch of recreational and commercial fishing ventures can include seabirds, sea turtles, sharks and rays, sawfish, and eels, as occurred with the bycatch and consequent discovery of Smith's witch eel (Facciolella smithi) by trawlers in the Arabian in July 2025.

===== Rare and endangered species =====
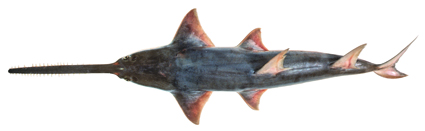
Top-down view of Anoxypristis Cuspidata (The knifetooth sawfish)

The knifetooth sawfish and largetooth sawfish, both critically endangered species once endemic to significant portions of coastal West Asia, the Indian Ocean, and Malaya, are now restricted to small strips of territory close to the shoreline in secluded pockets within those regions. Knifetooth populations are now primarily concentrated along the Makran and western Indian coasts, on the Ganges Delta, as well as in northern Australia and the Arafura Sea, having gone extinct in Masirah Bay and coastal East and Southeast Asia. Their presence in the Persian Gulf and Java and Sulu Seas is currently unknown. The largetooth is similarly extant in limited strips of coastal west India, the Ganges Delta, the Arafura and Coral Sea coast, Indonesia, and southern Papua New Guinea; unlike the knifetooth, it has persisted in Masirah Bay, the Java Sea, and the South China Sea, and remains extant along the East African coast as well, having gone extinct in 19 of its 60 former ranges along the Thai, Cambodian, and Vietnamese coasts, with an uncertain presence north of Borneo and the southwestern Philippines.

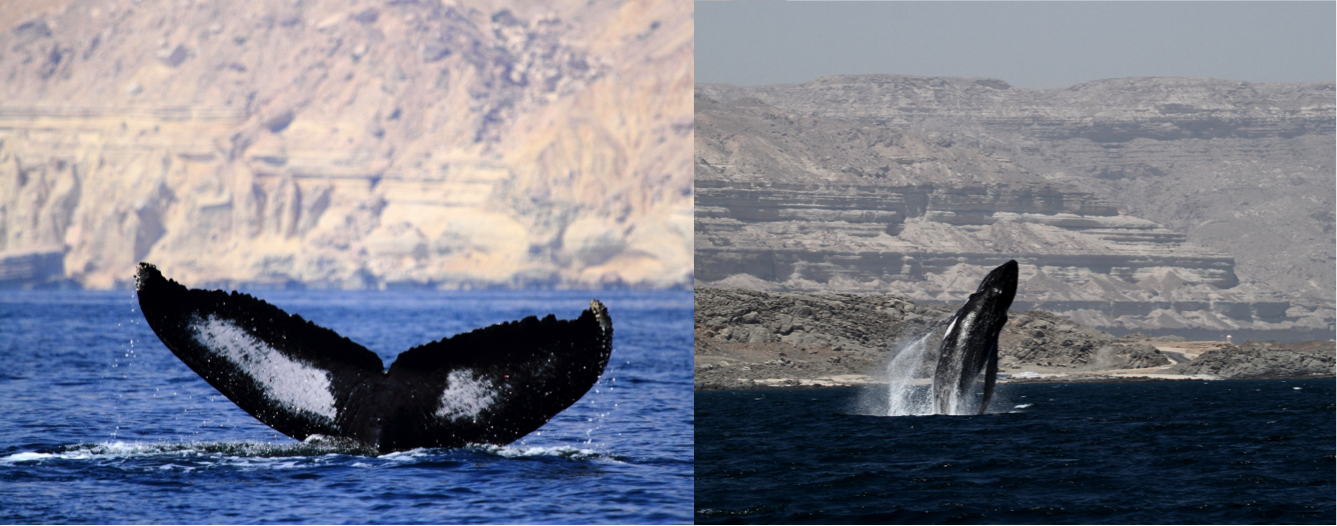
Critically endangered humpback whale herd off the coast of Dhofar, Oman

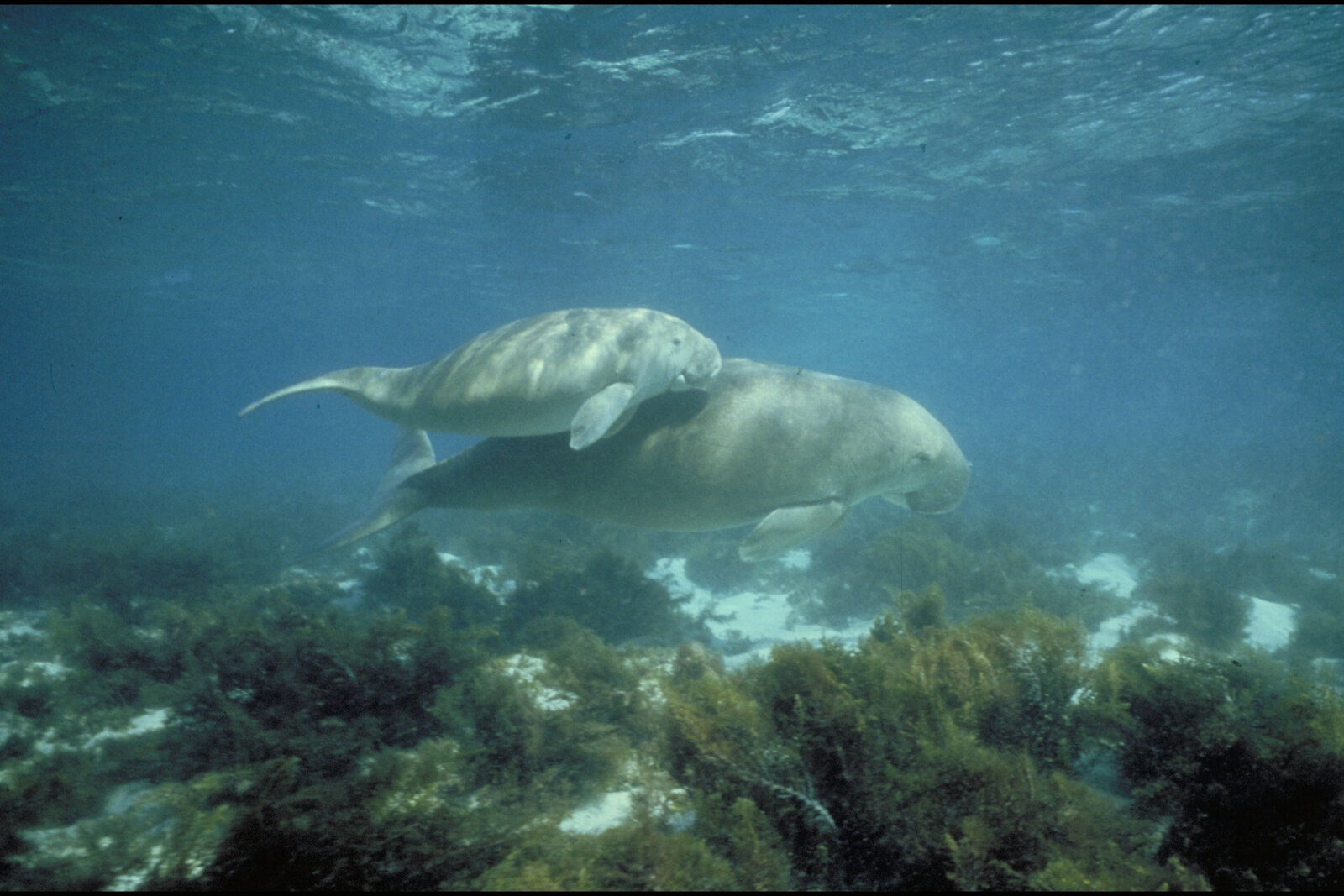
Dugong mother & her offspring in shallow waters

The dugong is the only sirenian found in the Indo-Pacific region. It has been listed as vulnerable on the IUCN Red List since 1982, on account of severe habitat and population loss. A 2011 survey suggested, though, that East African and Indian sub-populations were endangered, although it produced uncertain results concerning estimates of population numbers in the Red Sea and Gulfs of Aden, Oman, and Arabia (Persia). Although it persists across the extremes of its former range, many isolate populations residing within various island chains across the Indo-Pacific have gone extinct, on account of overfishing and habitat loss. Predictions of population success appear to be positively correlated with the HDI of the nation upon whose coastline they reside. Reasonably substantial populations are maintained by highly developed West Asian and Indo-Pacific nations and territories, including Australia, New Caledonia, Qatar, and the United Arab Emirates. It is protected under several charters of international maritime law.

In any case, the range and numbers of all species have diminished significantly in the past several decades, steeply so in the case of the sawfish. They face significant threats from habitat loss, unadaptable temperature extremes, bycatching and collision with vessels, poaching and subsistence hunting, pollution, and eutrophication. This threat is exacerbated by SST extremes in the Persian Gulf exceeding 34 °C (93 °F); such temperatures there and across the Indian Ocean basin have led to extensive coral bleaching across the ecosystem.

====== Sample of Arabian Sea species with IUCN listings and their associated protections under international law ======
Name	Image	Taxon name	IUCN Listing	Population status	Arabian LME – Current Distribution	Arabian LME – Extinct Status in the Wild	Threats to population*	Protections under national and international law
Knifetooth Sawfish		Anoxypristis cuspidata	CE	Decreasing	India; Pakistan; Iran (Presence uncertain (Un)); Sri Lanka (Un); UAE (Un)	Oman	H; PH*; BC-IN; HU; CC	Endangered Species Act (United States); Convention on International Trade in Endangered Species of Wild Fauna and Flora (CITES)
Dugong	Xpx	Dugong dugon	VU	Decreasing	India; Persian Gulf: 5800; Red Sea; Somalia; Sri Lanka; Yemen	None	H; PH; Pol; BC-IN*; HU; CC	Convention on the Conservation of Migratory Species (CMS)
Hawksbill Turtle	Xpx	Eretmochelys imbricata	CE	Decreasing	Indian Ocean; Persian Gulf; Red Sea	None	H*; PH**; Pol; BC-IN; HU; CC	Endangered Species Act; CITES; Protocol for Specially Protected Areas and Wildlife (SPAW)
Halavi Guitarfish		Glaucostegus halavi	CE	Decreasing	Bahrain; Djibouti; Egypt; Eritrea; India (Gujarat); Iran; Oman; Pakistan; Qatar; Saudi Arabia; Sudan; United Arab Emirates; Yemen	None	H*; PH**; Pol	Hunting banned year-round in the Sultanate of Oman; CITES
Largetooth Sawfish	Xpx	Pristis pristis	CE	Decreasing	India; Oman; Pakistan; Sri Lanka; Yemen (Un)	None	H; PH**; Pol; BC-IN*; HU; CC	Endangered Species Act; CITES
Sand Tiger Shark		Carcharius taurus	CE	Decreasing	Red Sea, Persian Gulf, and coastal Arabian Peninsula; Socotra; Pakistan; India; Sri Lanka	None	H**; PH; BC-IN; HU; CC*	EU Regulation 1185/2003; Various international finning and fishing bans; CITES; CMS

Various threats to the population are labelled as follows:

- (H) Habitat loss
- (PH) Poaching and subsistence hunting
- (Pol) Pollution
- (BC-IN) By-catch and hazards from human commercial / industrial activity
- (HU) Other hazards from human activity and infrastructure
- (CC) Warming waters or other extreme temperature / weather fluctuations
- (OX) Eutrophication and subsequent hazards in oxygen minimum zones (OMZs)

IUCN Status listed as follows:

- CE: Critically endangered
- EN: Endangered
- VU: Vulnerable

==== Mangrove forests ====
Most substantial mangrove ecosystems in the Middle East are clustered along the coasts of the Persian Gulf and Red Sea, with smaller pockets situated on the Gulf of Oman and Makran coastlines. Coastal forests along the Arabian Sea cover a relatively small expanse compared to those of other parts of the world, being restricted almost entirely to regions north of the Arabian Peninsula, the principal exceptions being Western India and a substantial cluster surrounding Masirah Island off the coast of southern Oman.

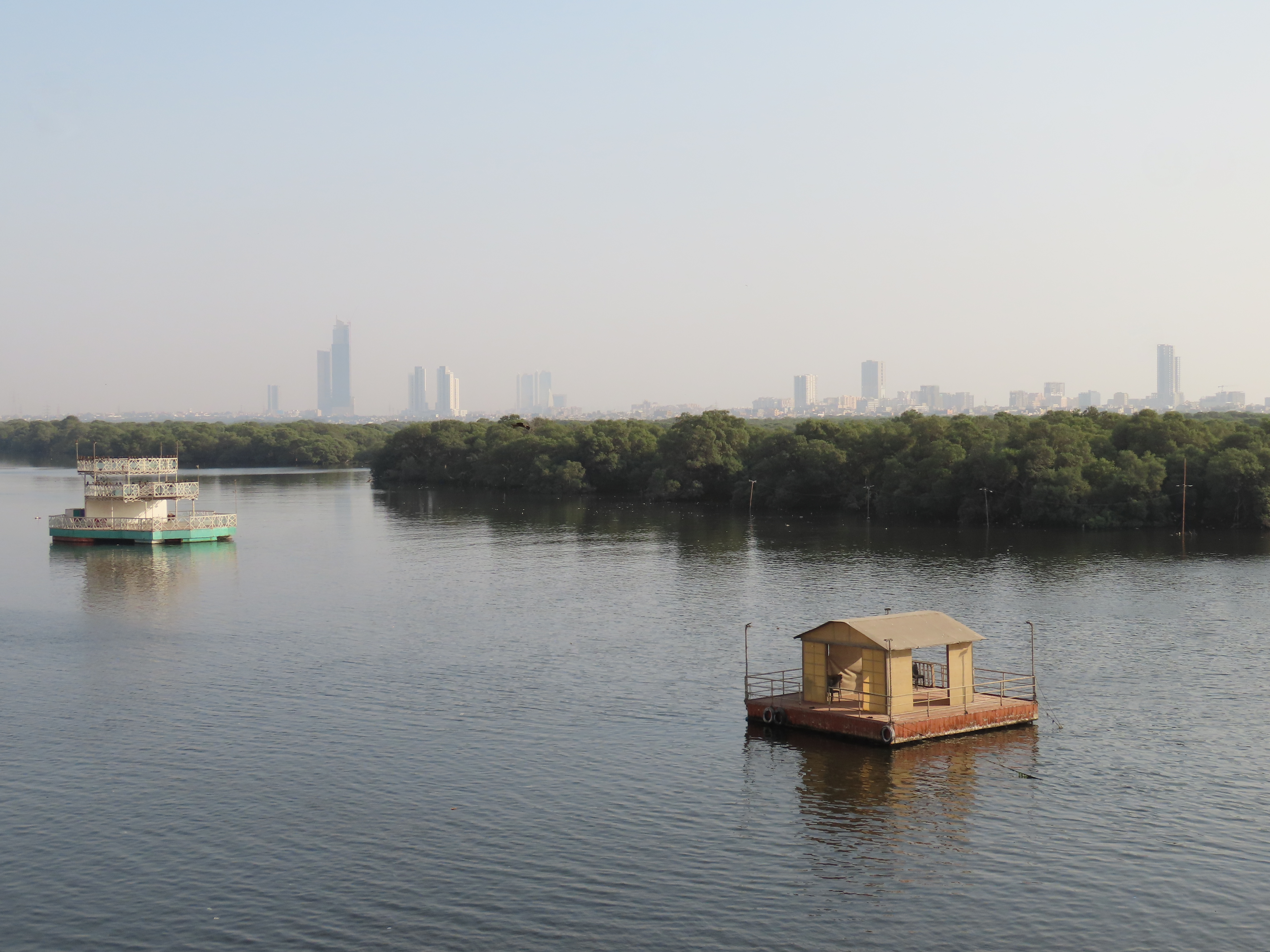
Mangrove forests in Karachi, Pakistan

==== Threats ====
The Arabian Sea's coastal and marine ecosystems face significant threats from human activity, including shipping, oil and gas extraction, military conflict, coastal development, and water desalination.

===== Pollution =====
Coastal pollution represents an existential threat to the health of Arabian Sea ecosystems, owing to the widespread deposition of hazardous materials from rivers and industrial facilities bordering and within the sea. Solid waste buildup along the shorelines of much of the Arabian LME is significant, resulting from the inadequate solid waste and wastewater handling and disposal practices of basin countries. Heavy metal deposition off the coast of western India has been raised as a serious concern as well.

====== Oxygen minimum zone ======
The Arabian Sea has one of the world's three largest oceanic oxygen minimum zones (OMZ), or "dead zones," along with the eastern tropical North Pacific and the eastern tropical South Pacific. OMZs have very low levels of oxygen, sometimes so low as to be undetectable to standard equipment. The Arabian Sea's OMZ has the lowest levels of oxygen in the world, most prevalently in the Gulf of Oman. This eutrophication is driven to by pollution and global heating, as well as the acceleration of the Arabian Sea monsoon cycle, which drives increased upwelling in the summer and fall, and increasingly spring and winter as well.

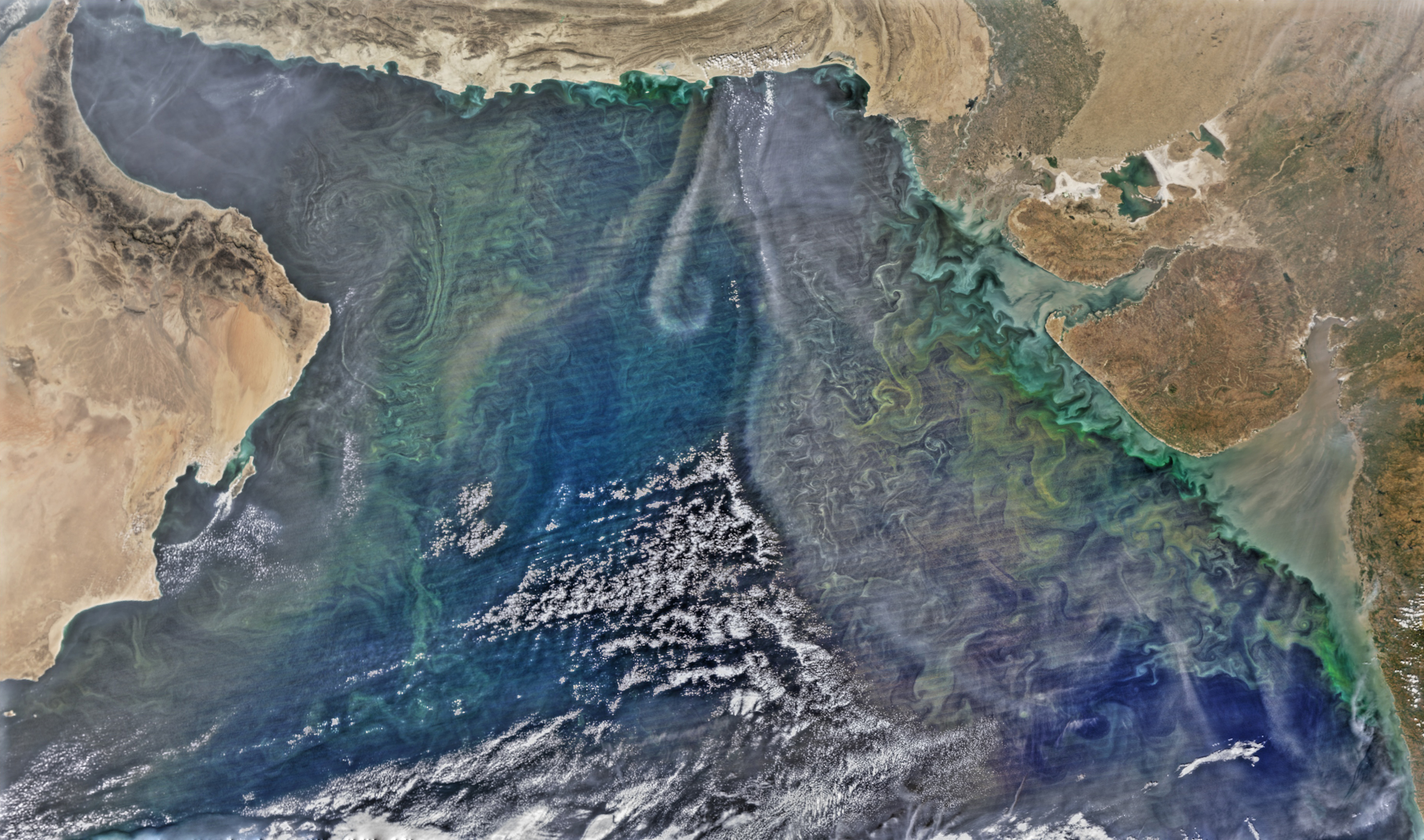
Phytoplankton bloom over the Arabian Sea in winter (NASA)

Causes of the OMZ may include untreated wastewater deposited into the Arabian Sea from, and high temperatures on the Indian subcontinent. Additionally, strong winds pushing towards the subcontinent drive up nutrients further alongside runoff from sewage and agriculture, further reducing oxygen in the Arabian Sea's waters. The presence of the monsoons, combined with the sea's unique hydrography and circulation patterns have historically complicated natural re-oxygenation of sea water in the basin. Research from the University of Southampton published in 2026 studying the presence and circulation of nutrients and marine microorganisms in the Miocene Arabian projected a long-term future reversal of de-oxygenation in the world's oceans, even amidst global warming, but showed evidence that the Arabian Sea took longer than its neighbors to recover from worldwide ocean de-oxygenation, without offering a definitive conclusion as to its cause. Unlike then, eutrophication in the Arabian has progressed to the point of nitrogen being released from the sea into the atmosphere. In winter, phytoplankton suited to low-oxygen conditions turn the OMZ bright green.

== History ==
=== The Arabian Sea trade ===
The Arabian Sea has served as an important route for and center of maritime trade since the development of early coastal sailing vessels in the Northern Indian Ocean and Southern Arabia in the 4th and 3rd millennia BC. Additionally, the sea and the lands surrounding it served as the central nexus of the Maritime Silk Road as it developed from the 2nd century BC onward. The trade led to the widespread migration and resettlement of various populations (coupled with a broader economic reordering of the coast and hinterland), the spread of pathogens and thus the instigation of various pandemics, the mass diffusion of ideas, technologies, and belief systems across the basin, and the joining of distant markets in goods, capital, and persons on the opposite ends of the Old World. Millet and sorghum, for instance, were introduced to the Indus Valley Civilization by means of the sea trade with East Africa. Most critical, though, was the maritime trade's role in facilitating the spread of Islam out from the Arabian Peninsula across the Indian Ocean to East Africa, South Asia, Southeast Asia, and the islands of the Malay Archipelago.

==== The monsoon variable ====
In the era of square rigged vessels, the Arabian Sea trade was effectively governed by the Northeast-Southwest Drift pattern of the northern Indian Monsoon Current. Northeasterly winds dominated in the summer months, allowing traders embarking from East Africa, the Horn of Africa, and the Arabian Peninsula to sail north and eastwards towards South Asia and the Bay of Bengal. Once there, early Arabian Sea traders were essentially trapped, marooned at their destination until the reversal and softening of the winds and ocean currents, which would enable them to sail home on calmer waters. This dynamic, combined with the desolate geography and inaccessibility of long stretches of the Arabian shoreline, made contact with one's point of origin before the beginning of the favorable monsoon regime effectively impossible. Sailors typically followed one of three "navigation circuits", all dependent upon local wind patterns to function. The first circuit rotated between the northern Red Sea and East Africa, the second from the Gulf of Aden to India, and the third from the Persian Gulf to either India or East Africa, with it being possible to finish all such journeys within a years time, potentially two, but never more. Routes during this period were thus heavily segmented, with sailors at each leg of the journey holding an effective monopoly on goods from markets in the east in the west, and vice versa.

Late 19th century navigational chart of the northern Indian Ocean, with the wind patterns of the Arabian Sea shown in the northwest. Seabed depths are shown as well.

The diffusion of the fore-and-aft rigged vessels into the Arabian Sea at the end of the 1st millennium CE changed the character of shipping in the Arabian Sea and across the wider Indian Ocean. The lateen sail originated in the Mediterranean in the latter part of the classical period and diffused into the Arabian Sea from there.

==== Beginnings through Antiquity (4000 BC – 600 CE) ====
Trade along the Makran and Arabian shoreline is evidenced to have occurred as early as the 4th millennium, whilst sea-borne trade possibly began as early as the 3rd millennium, certainly by the late 2nd millennium in the early stages of the Age of Sail. Early traders moved along the coast in reed boats and canoes, trading at local settlements and coastal hubs along the way. Modern evidence points to a sea-borne trade between the kingdoms of Mesopotamia and the Persian Gulf, Ancient Egypt, and the Indus Valley Civilization along the Arabian coast dating to the late 3rd millennium. Translated cuneiform texts from the reign of Sargon of Akkad point to an extensive ship building industry centered at Akkad, and an equally extensive sea-borne trade between his empire, Tilmun, a collection of coastal trading hubs in present-day Qatar, Bahrain, and Eastern Saudi Arabia, Magan, a civilization on the Gulf of Oman, and the Indus Valley Civilization (Meluhha).

Major Harappan ports included Kanjetar, Megham, and Lothal, one of the earliest if not the earliest known port of the Bronze Age to have an artificial dock with water-locking arrangements, situated along a route running from the Makran Coast to the Indus River Delta, on to sites once located on rivers draining into the Gulf of Khambat. Little archaeological evidence exists of any Harappan vessels which would have been used in the trade, apart from illustrations found on ceramics and cuneiform tablets from that period, and remnants of a ship in Oman carrying beads originating in India. Contact between Egypt and Punt began with the Eighteenth Dynasty under Hatshepsut in the early 15th century BC; merchants of this trade, though, mainly traversed the Red Sea and or tributaries of the Nile.

By the time of Julius Caesar, several well-established combined land-sea trade routes flowing to the Roman Empire depended upon water transport through the Arabian Sea around rough and desolate inland terrain features to the sea's north. Trade between Egypt and India greatly increased during this period, predominantly via square-sailed Mediterranean vessels. These routes usually began in the Far East or down river from Madhya Pradesh, India with transshipment via historic Bharuch (Bharakuccha), traversing past the inhospitable coast of modern-day Iran, then splitting near Hadhramaut in south-central Arabia into two streams heading northwards, either by land along the Red Sea, or by sea via the Gulf of Aden through the Bab-el-Mandeb, and thence into the Levant, or south on to Alexandria via Red Sea ports such as Axum. Outgoing Roman vessels would split at the Bab-el-Mandeb, some heading eastwards towards India with the monsoon wind, about a year's journey, the remainder heading south towards Rhapta, near present-day Dar es Salaam, a roughly two-year voyage going one direction. At this time, depending on one's location and place of origin, the standard lingua franca of commerce may have been Greek, Prakrit, Sanskrit, or Aramaic, among others.

Names, routes and locations of the Periplus of the Erythraean Sea

Good transport along the southern coastal route past the rough country of the southern Arabian Peninsula by sea was significant, and thus the Egyptian Pharaohs built several shallow canals to service the trade, one more or less along the route of today's Suez Canal, and another from the Red Sea to the Nile River; both shallow works were ultimately swallowed up by huge sand storms in antiquity. Each major route in both regions involved the transshipment of goods on to pack-animal caravans, which then travelled through desert country, a journey often interlaced with extortionate tolls levied by local rulers. Arab merchants were already engaged in trade with East Africa by this period, with additional maritime routes developing in the Persian Gulf by the 3rd century CE. Trade on all routes is thought to have been heavily localized, with goods travelling from one merchant to the next along the coast, creating a virtually monopolized marketplace at each location. Trade with Sri Lankan markets in the western Indian Ocean, for instance, was conducted by Persian merchants, who continued the route on past the Levant and Arabian Peninsula. South Indian and Sri Lankan traders, in turn, continued the route on towards Oceania and Southeast Asia, and so on.

The Arabian Sea is described at length in the Periplus of the Erythraean Sea ("The Circumnavigation of the Red Sea"), a mid-1st century Greek merchant text detailing the trading corridors linking the Indian, East African, Arabian, and Mediterranean worlds. The work is believed to be largely accurate as relates to the polities and trading conditions of the Red Sea, Gulf of Aden, and the Arabian Sea shorelines of India, Arabia, and the Makran. Recent investigations, though, have led to skepticism concerning the presence and significance of Mediterranean traders in the Arabian Sea during this period, on account of the work's inaccurate depictions of regions largely unknown to them except through merchants operating in the immediate maritime environs of the Egypto-Mediterranean world.

Activity in the Arabian Sea from the Bronze Age to the end of Antiquity
	Major exports	Major imports	Major polities	Major coastal trade hubs
Western India	Spices; Black pepper; Cinnamon (← Sri Lanka); Goods ferried from the Spice islands; Silks (← China); Gemstones (Region dependent); Ivory; Cotton / Textiles; Pearls; Agricultural goods; Wheat; Seafood; Rice	Frankincense; Myrrh; Gold; Iron; Gemstones	Indus Valley Civilization (Harappa); Maurya Empire; Satavahana Dynasty; Kshapatra Kingdom; Gupta Empire	Lothal (Harappa); Muziris (Laccadive Sea); Khambut (Gupta); Goa; Bharuch; Calicut (Malabar Coast)
Sindh / Makran Coast (Gedrosia)	Ivory; Cotton; Timber; Gemstones; Lapis lazuli; Carnelian	Copper; Iron; Wool; Leather; Incense; Shells; Olive oil	Indus Valley Civilization; Media; Achaemenid Empire; Kingdom of Macedon; Seleucid Empire; Parthian Empire; Sassanid Persia; Baloch clans	Sotka Koh (Harappa); Sutkagan Dor (Harappa); Barbarikon / Debal (Karachi)
Southern Arabia	Incense; Frankincense; Myrrh; Goods ferried from other regions (→ Mediterranean, East Africa, South Asia, Mesopotamia and the Levant); Metals; Pearls; Dates	Ambergris (← East Africa); Skins / furs (← Africa); Porcelain (← China); Silk (← China); Wine (→ Horn of Africa / ← Mediterranean); Specie; Glass; Gemstones (→ Mediterranean / Mesopotamia | ← South Asia)	Magan; Awsan; Hadhramaut; Qataban; Himyar; Sassanid Persia	Qanā; Masirah; Muscat; Qalhat; Salalah; Muza (Red Sea)
Horn of Africa	Game; Myrrh (← East Africa); Ivory; Gold; Salt; Furs; Slaves (← Southern Africa, East Africa); Incense; Spices	Iron; Cotton (→ East Africa); Silk; Tortoiseshell (← East Africa)	Punt (Red Sea); Axum (Red Sea / Gulf of Aden)	Malao (Gulf of Aden); Mosylon (Gulf of Aden); Tave; Punt (Red Sea); Adulis (Red Sea); Berenike (Red Sea); Axum (Red Sea); Mogadishu (East Africa); Socotra

==== Middle Ages to Portuguese Contact (600 – 1498 CE) ====
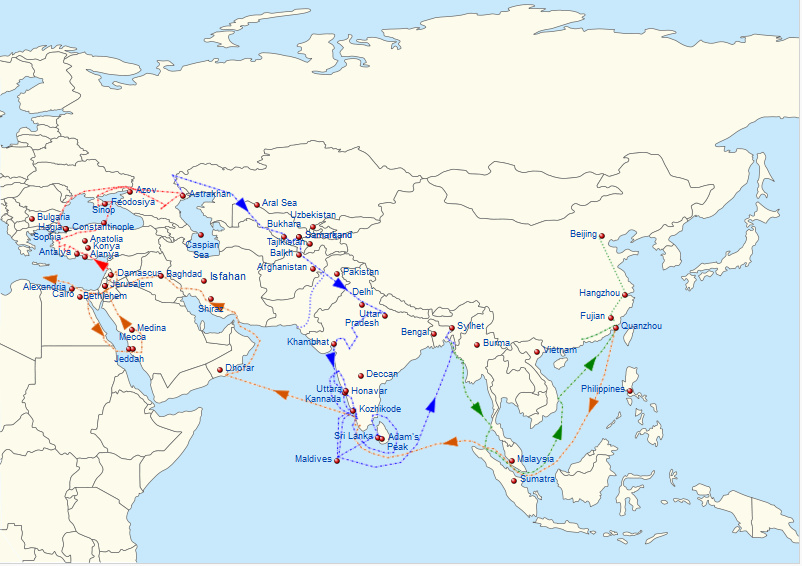
Later voyages of Maghrebi scholar and traveller Ibn Battuta in the mid-14th century

Trade exploded in the Arabian Sea with the emergence of Islam and the subsequent unification of the Arab, Persian, and Egyptian worlds under a singular religious, cultural, political, and thus, effectively, maritime banner. Scholars at madrasas and universities across the lands of the first three caliphates produced substantial advancements in physics, mathematics, shipbuilding, and astronomy which greatly assisted and enhanced the execution of long-distance trade. Developments such as these were spurned by knowledge of sailing and oceanography handed down to them by the Persians, with the most advanced long-distance vessels used by Arab merchants typically being produced in India during the Rashidun era. The advancements made starting from this period onward were eventually diffused across the continent as far as Europe and China, spurring the growth and development of an extensive Old World maritime trade network operating in tandem with the Silk Road. This, combined with the substantial prevalence of Muslim merchants along southern maritime trade networks as a result of it led to Arabic becoming the de facto language of commerce across the Indian Ocean. Arab dominance of the trade would last until the arrival of European powers in the 15th and 16th centuries.

The superior freight capacity and efficiency of sea-transport led the Maritime Silk Road to gradually overtake the overland Silk Road in terms of importance and volume of goods trafficked. Though the overland route did not experience its peak until the Mongol Era, the collapse of this system of rule and the subsequent chaos it engendered across much of the interior drove many merchants seawards, exacerbating the shift away from the overland trade. Ship transport would overwhelmingly eclipse the Silk Road during this period, marking the start of the final stage of the routes' history, ending with its effective demise in the 16th century.

==== Long-distance trade ====
Direct maritime trade links between Arabia and China are believed to have developed as early as the 9th century CE. Routes connecting the Tang Dynasty to Persia are thought to have developed prior to this period during the early Islamic era. At the very least, evidence found at the Belitung shipwreck in the late 1990s off the western coast of Belitung, Indonesia, points to direct trade between Tang China and merchants operating in the Arabian Sea as early as the late first millennium. The majority of items recovered, and believed to be in transit, were luxury goods such as ceramics and pottery. The remainder were largely other high-value manufactured items such as cast iron and silverware, all having been purchased by or bestowed upon the crew in China, or thereafter traded for in Sumatra. Coincidentally, significant activity from pirates along Arabian Sea trade routes first developed during this period. The Phanom Surin shipwreck, found in 2013 between the mouths of the Tha Chin and Chao Praya Rivers in Thailand, shows evidence of trade in perishable goods and ceramics on the Southeast Asian mainland by merchants from the Persian Gulf within the same period.

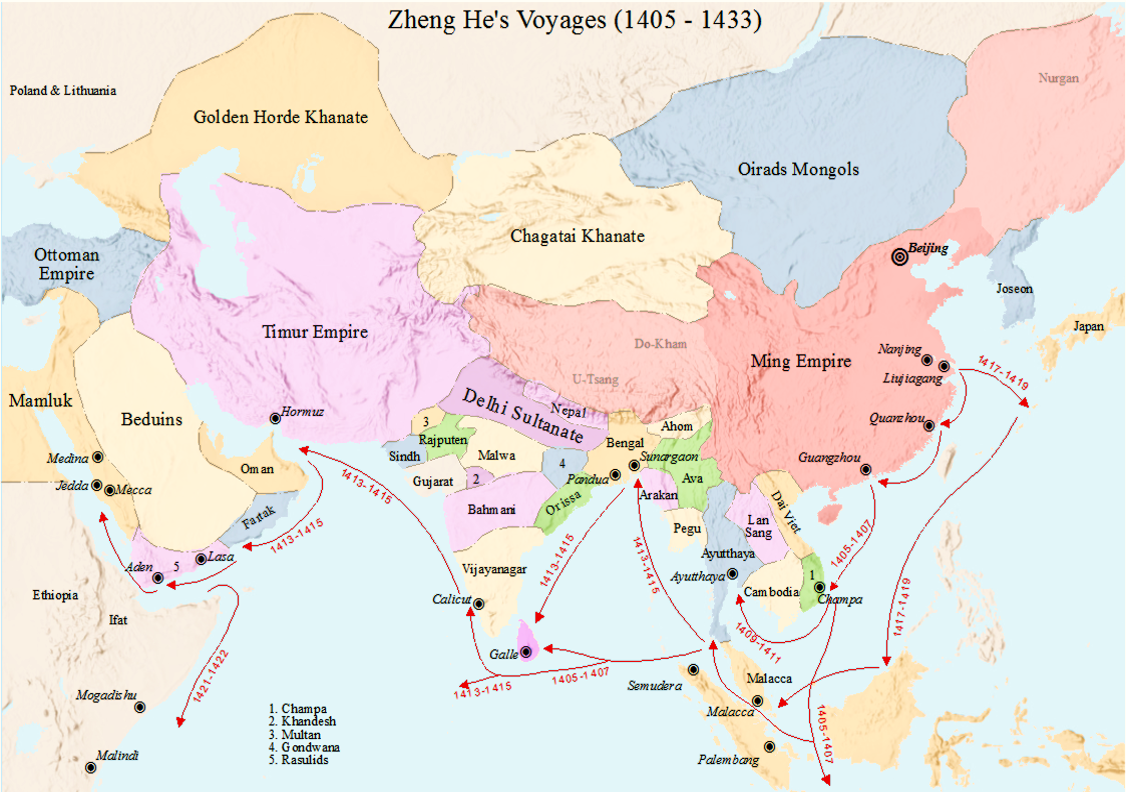
Voyages of Ming Admiral Zheng He in the early 15th century

===== Zheng He =====
Admiral Zheng He first ventured into the Arabian Sea region on the first of his seven voyages, from 1405 to 1406, docking his fleet of 317 ships at the Laccadive Sea ports of Ceylon, Kollam, and Calicut, before returning to the Ming capital at Nanjing with ambassadors of the latter two kingdoms sent to bear tribute to the Yongle Emperor. He returned to the region on his third voyage in 1409, erecting the Galle Trilingual Inscription in Ceylon, before venturing on to Calicut once again. On the return in 1411, the Sinhalese king Alagakkonara attempted to kidnap him and plunder the fleet; thereafter, the king was captured, returned to Nanjing, ultimately released by the emperor, and returned home. The Chinese supported a rival regime in the aftermath of the event. On the fourth voyage, between 1413 and 1415, a fleet of 63 ships and 28,000 men travelled to the Maldives and port of Hormuz, with a sub-fleet possibly venturing to the Port of Aden as well. The voyage yielded the tribute of 18 kingdoms, 17 of them from India, with the heads of state of those kingdoms returning with the fleet to personally present themselves to the emperor. The fifth voyage (1417–19), intended to return the various envoys to their homelands, continued on to Aden before venturing down the East African coastline to Brawa, Mogadishu, and Malindi. The voyage returned with a cargo of African wildlife, including leopards, lions, dromedaries, and rhinoceroses. Most notably, though, the fleet returned with a giraffe, which was associated in China with the qilin, a legendary beast symbolizing virtue and prosperity.

The Yongle Emperor died after the sixth voyage (1421–22), which saw parts of the fleet, excluding Zheng He, return to "Hormuz, Dhufar, Aden, Mogadishu, and Brawa", possibly travelling as far as present-day Mozambique. The practice ended at the seventh voyage (1431–33), sent by the Yongle Emperor's successor, the Xuande Emperor, with the primary intention of ensuring peaceful relations in the South China Sea as the country began to look inward. The fleet, composed of 100 large ships and more than 20,000 sailors, visited every major port in the South China Sea and Indian Ocean, travelling as far as Jeddah in the Red Sea. Zheng He is thought to have died amid this voyage, and was likely buried at sea in accordance with Islamic tradition.

==== Imperialism, conflict, and migrant communities – societal consequences of the trade ====
The prevalence of interregional maritime trade in the Arabian Sea and wider Indian Ocean encouraged the creation of numerous diasporic communities across disparate regions over millennia. Diasporic communities, even if they held on to their traditional beliefs and cultural practices, became part of a heavily intermixed, highly heterogeneous society. Rarely were the terms of trade or of one's identity defined on the basis of ethnicity; rather, one's community and region of origin played a far more substantial role in the substance and particularities of their dealings abroad. Ties were built on the basis of shared religious, linguistic, or (as in cases of trade within the borders of or on behalf of the region's various empires) political heritage.

Evidence from the Periplus of the Erythraean Sea points to the development of intercultural diasporic merchant communities in Rhapta (East Africa), Punt/Axum (modern-day Eritrea), Socotra, and Muziris by no later than the turn of the 1st millennia. Indian trading diasporas are thought to have developed in Egypt, Oman, and pilgrimages carried out at sites of worship on Socotra during the same period. Archaeological evidence shows that merchants from the Roman city of Palmyra in central Syria played a central and critical role in the facilitation of trade between the Indian Ocean world and the Roman Empire in the Red and Arabian Seas, not unlike the Italian merchant communities which would come to exist in the Mediterranean centuries later. Palmyrene merchant networks were highly centralized, and their interactions heavily identity dependent, with intensive ties stretching back to aristocratic families in the homeland, which could be used to reward or punish merchants for acting in or out of accordance with group norms. Numerous languages were used in trade, dependent upon the region, and the groups engaged in particular dealings. Stone engravings provide indication of Palmyrene, Mesopotamian, and Indian retainers serving at the court of the king of Hadhramaut in the 3rd century.

===== Conquest and migration =====
The Arabian Sea's unique geography and position as a crucial transit hub for goods travelling between Europe, East Africa, the Middle East, and Asia has encouraged efforts by numerous empires and groups throughout history to establish imperial control over its bounding territories. This began as early as the 3rd century CE, when the kingdoms of the Southern Arabian Peninsula fell under the effective suzerainty of Sassanid Persia following its conquest of Oman and Bahrain. Efforts by Axum to take control of Yemen were thwarted by a combined Yemeni-Sassanid force in the 6th century which, paired with the appearance of the Persian Gulf as the primary maritime trading hub of the Indian Ocean in the Umayyad and Abbasid Caliphates several centuries later, hastened the kingdom's collapse.

The collapse of Axum occurred in tandem with the migration of Bantu peoples northwards from East Africa following their arrival in the region in the early centuries of the first millennium. They drove a demographic realignment of both East Africa and the Horn of Africa as they intermixed with local indigenous populations. Raw minerals and materials gathered by them or for which they traded for or which they pillaged in the interior were thereafter traded along the coast for manufactured goods produced in or arriving from the north. The cities developed through this industry spurred the creation of new markets, driving trade southwards towards the islands of Zanzibar and the Swahili coast. Many Arab merchants migrated southwards to service the trade, establishing cities at major ports of call, such as Zanzibar, Lamu, and Malindi, between 684 and 705 CE.

The maritime system of the Arabian Sea became somewhat unified during the era of the Mongol conquests (1219–1335), as had previously been seen to some degree under the Rashidun, Umayyad, and Abbasid Caliphates, with one polity maintaining effective tributary status or taxational authority over an area stretching from modern-day Pakistan to Mesopotamia and the Persian Gulf, and simultaneously holding significant sway over the actions of the merchants and polities operating along its borders.

== Modern economic and geopolitical activity ==
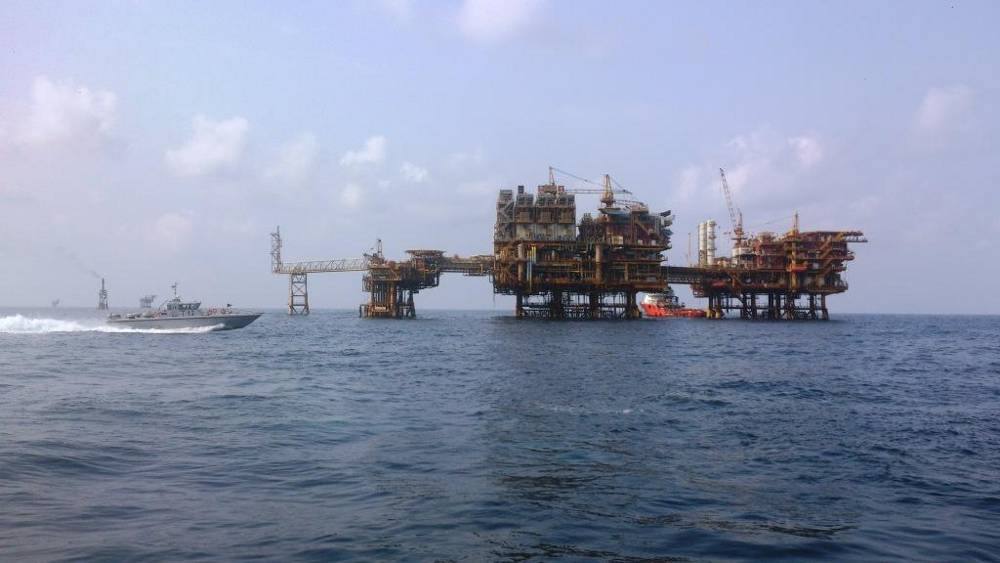
Indian military vessels patrolling near an oil platform off the coast of Mumbai

=== Petroleum and natural gas – shipping and production ===
A majority of the vast heavy oil and natural gas deposits in the Middle East are located at higher elevations in the Persian Gulf or inland north of the Arabian Basin. Major natural gas deposits, though, have been found on the sea's eastern edge off the coast of Western India. As a result of the former fact, traffic through the Strait of Hormuz on into the Arabian Sea accounts for roughly 25% of the global seaborne oil trade, transporting a majority of the crude oil exports of most Gulf nations. It accounts for 19% of seaborne LNG trade, representing more than 90% of the total LNG exports of Qatar and the United Arab Emirates. The vast majority of traffic, in both cases, is bound for Asia.

=== Commercial fishing and marine resource exploitation ===
Exploited marine species in the Arabian Sea include Indian oil sardines, typically caught off the west coast of India, and the drum and croaker fish of the family Sciaenidae. Most landing reports only indicate the catch as being 'marine fish', making a specific cataloguing of exploited species and variants difficult. Large oceanic pelagic fish are popular among commercial fishermen, otherwise. Bombay duck and anchovies are also harvested in significant quantities. Roughly half the market value of reported landings in the Arabian Sea can be attributed to perch- and herring-like species, with only a small quantity attributed to large marine species such as sharks and rays.

The Arabian Sea LME was one of the few large marine ecosystems to see little to no growth in commercial fishing yields from the 1990s to 2010s, reaching a settling point of roughly 2 million tonnes in 1990: This represented a quadrupling of fishing yields from 1950 onwards. Exploitation in the region has increased recently as a result of the intensive activity of Chinese industrial fishing vessels in the sea and wider Indian Ocean; these actions have been heavily scrutinized by Western and West and South Asian sources, among them, most notably, the governments of India and the United States. Trawl fishing operations are widespread within the Persian Gulf, in Oman, and across the Indian EEZ. Many nations on the Arabian coast suffer from extreme overcapacity in the fishing industry, having designed the market around large scale, industrial producers, at the expense of small-scale, relatively more sustainable local producers.

==== Recreational fishing ====
Recreational fishing is popular in the Sultanate of Oman.

=== Major ports and naval installations ===
Oil makes up a significant proportion of the commercial traffic handled by ports in the Arabian Sea, particularly in its north and east. Eastern ports have seen a marked uptick in activity since the start of the 2026 Iran War.

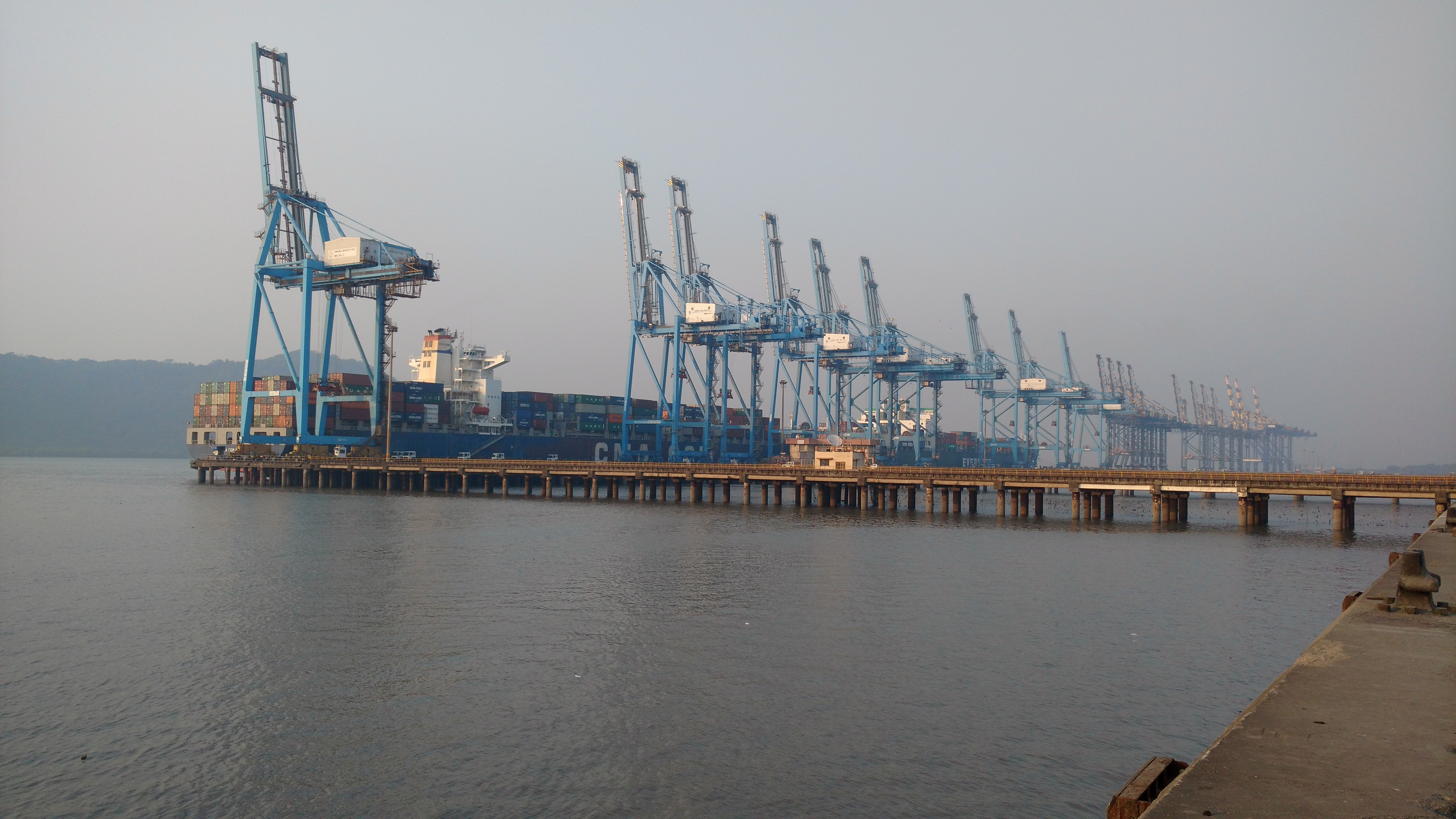
View of container crane docks at Jawaharlal Nehru Port in Mumbai

==== India ====
Jawaharlal Nehru Port in Mumbai is the largest port in the Arabian Sea, and the largest container port in India. In 2017, the port suffered a major cyberattack targeting the operations of Danish shipping giant Maersk. Other major Indian ports of the Arabian Sea include the Port of Mumbai (Maharashtra), Mundra, Kandla and Pipavav Ports (Gujarat), and Mormugão Port (Goa).

==== Pakistan ====
The Port of Karachi is Pakistan's largest and busiest seaport, located on the country's southeastern coast. It is situated between the Karachi towns of Kiamari and Saddar. Gwadar Port is a warm-water, deep-sea port situated at Gwadar in Balochistan at the apex of the Arabian Sea near the entrance to the Persian Gulf, about 460 km west of Karachi, and approximately 75 km (47 mi) east of Pakistan's border with Iran. The port is located on the eastern bay of a natural hammerhead-shaped peninsula jutting into the Arabian Sea from the coastline. 280 km east along the coast at Ormara sits Jinnah Naval Base, the country's second largest naval base, which is situated on a similarly shaped tombolo jutting into the Arabian.

==== Oman ====
Oman is home to a variety of foreign military installations which provide auxiliary and support services to friendly vessels and crew. In the 2010s, the Port of Salalah in the country's south hosted personnel from a joint international task force combatting piracy in the Arabian Sea. The port has seen a decline in traffic in recent years owing to attacks by Yemeni Houthi rebels. The British-Omani Duqm Naval Dockyard provides repair and maintenance services to vessels of friendly nations. Additional facilities are operated by the United States Air Force on Masirah Island.

==== Yemen ====
The Port of Nishtoun is the only major Yemeni port facing the Arabian Sea, located on the country's far eastern coast near the border with Oman. Nishtoun is used as a coordination site between Yemeni merchants and regional trading partners in the Gulf, while fishing accounts for most of its annual stationary functions. In December 2025, the port was seized by forces of the U.A.E-backed Southern Transitional Council (STC), prior to its collapse in January of the following year.

== See also ==
- Indian Ocean Rim Association
- North Indian Ocean tropical cyclone
- Piracy off the coast of Somalia

== Works cited ==
- Agius, Dionisius (2008). Classic Ships of Islam: From Mesopotamia to the Indian Ocean. Leiden, Neth. / Boston, Mass.: Koninklijke Brill NV. ISBN 978-90-04-15863-4.
- Ansary, Tamim (2009). Destiny Disrupted: A History of the World Through Islamic Eyes. PublicAffairs. ISBN 978-1-58648-606-8.
- Darley, Rebecca (November 2024). "Indian Ocean Trade in the First Millennium c.e.: Taking the Romans out of Indo-Roman?". The Journal of Roman Studies. 114: 145–169. doi:10.1017/S0075435824000315. ISSN 0075-4358.
- Heileman, S.; Eghtesadi-Aradi, P.; Mistafa, N. (2020), VI-9 Arabian Sea: LME Brief #32, University of Rhode Island – via International Waters Learning Exchange and Resource Network (iwlearn.net). Uploaded December 2020.
- Komoot, Abhirada (June 2021). Maritime Connections in the Indian Ocean World during the Late First Millennium CE: An Archaeological Study of the Phanom-Surin Ship in Thailand (PDF) (Doctor of Philosophy thesis). University of Western Australia. Retrieved 2026-05-19.
- White, Lynn (1978). Medieval Religion and Technology: Collected Essays. University of California Press. ISBN 978-0-520-30122-1. JSTOR jj.15976671.

=== Public domain and Creative Commons ===
- - A book and Atlas
