= Oyster Rocks, Karachi =

Island in Karachi, Pakistan

Oyster Rocks
Native name: کستورا مچهلی Nickname: Clifton Oyster Rocks
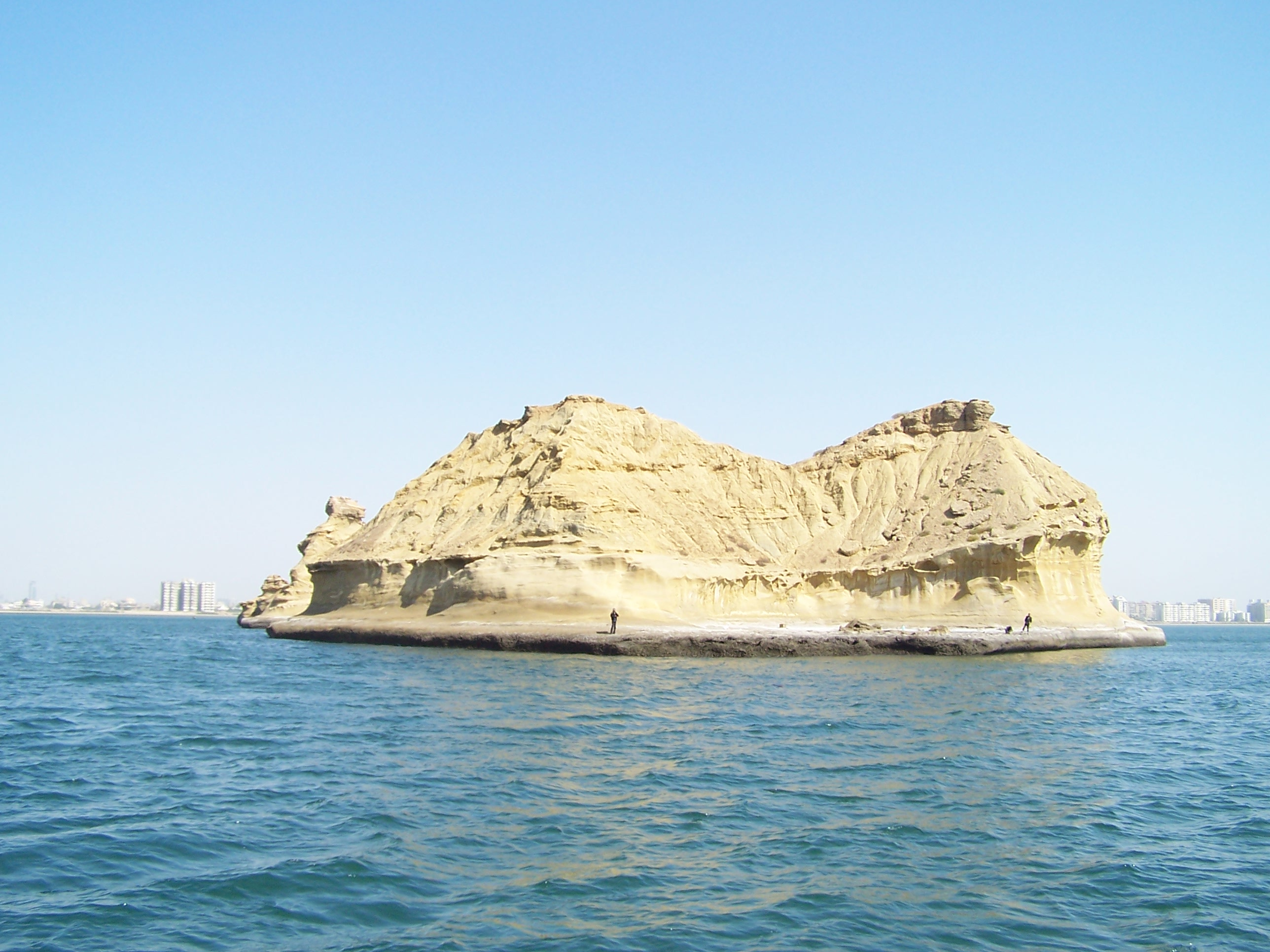
- A scene of largest of the Oyster Rocks in c. 2017

- Location within Sindh Location within Pakistan

Geography
- Location: Clifton, Karachi, Pakistan
- Coordinates: 24°48′02″N 66°59′54″E
- Archipelago: Oyster Rocks

The Clifton Oyster Rocks (Urdu: کستورا مچهلی) are a small archipelago off the coast of Karachi's Clifton neighborhood in Sindh, Pakistan. Formerly under the control of the Pakistan Navy, the islands were integrated into Karachi's urban redevelopment plans in 2006.

As part of this initiative, the Port Fountain was constructed at the base of the northern island, reaching a height of 620 feet (190 m) and briefly ranking as the world's second-tallest fountain.

Additionally, in 2015, a 2.5 kilometres (1.6 mi) breakwater, the Oyster Rock Strip, was built in collaboration with China under the Pakistan Deep Water Container Port (PDWCP) Project to protect the South Asia Pakistan Terminal from tidal forces and coastal erosion.

== Gallery ==
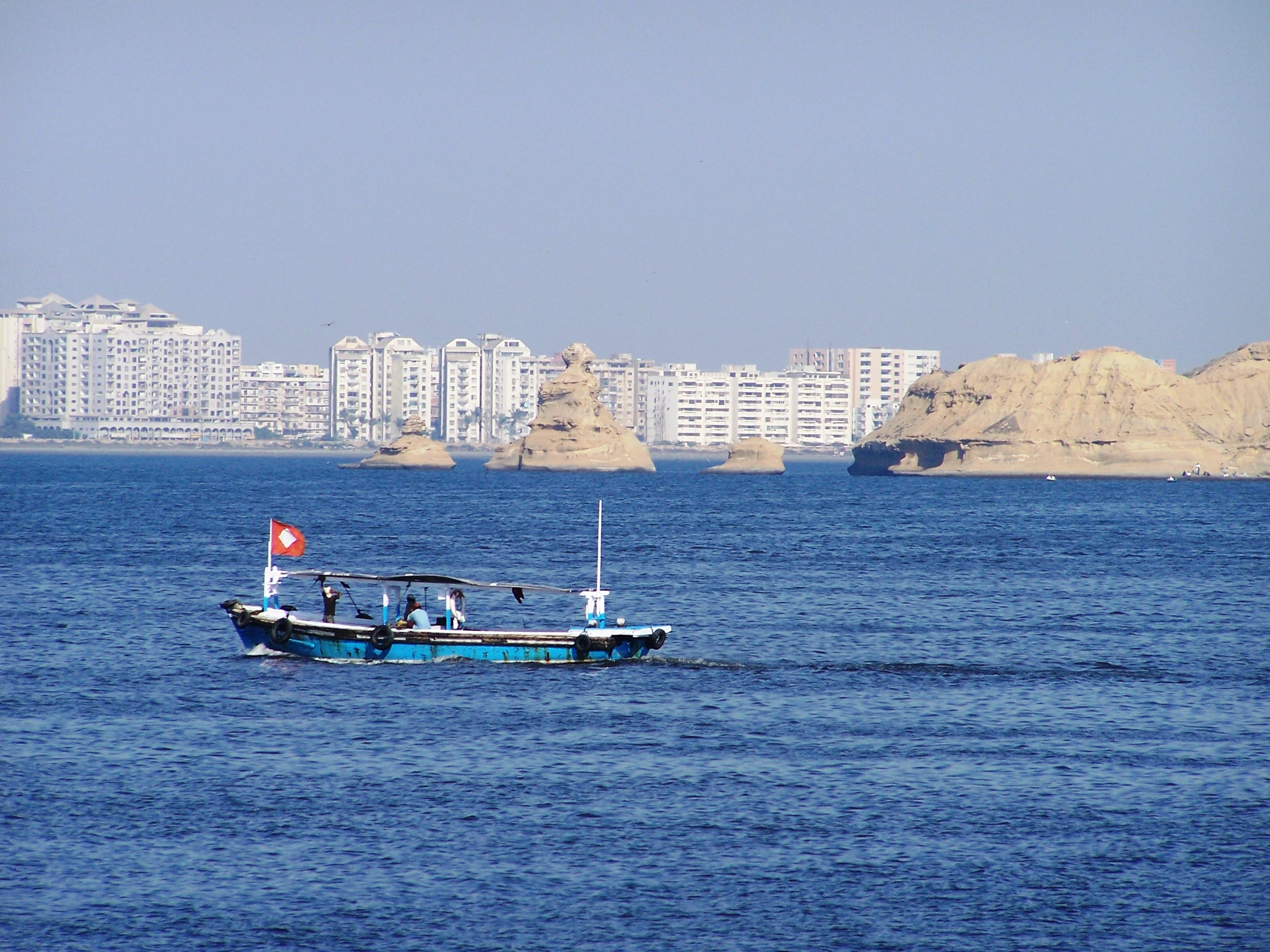
A scene of boat near the Oyster Rocks

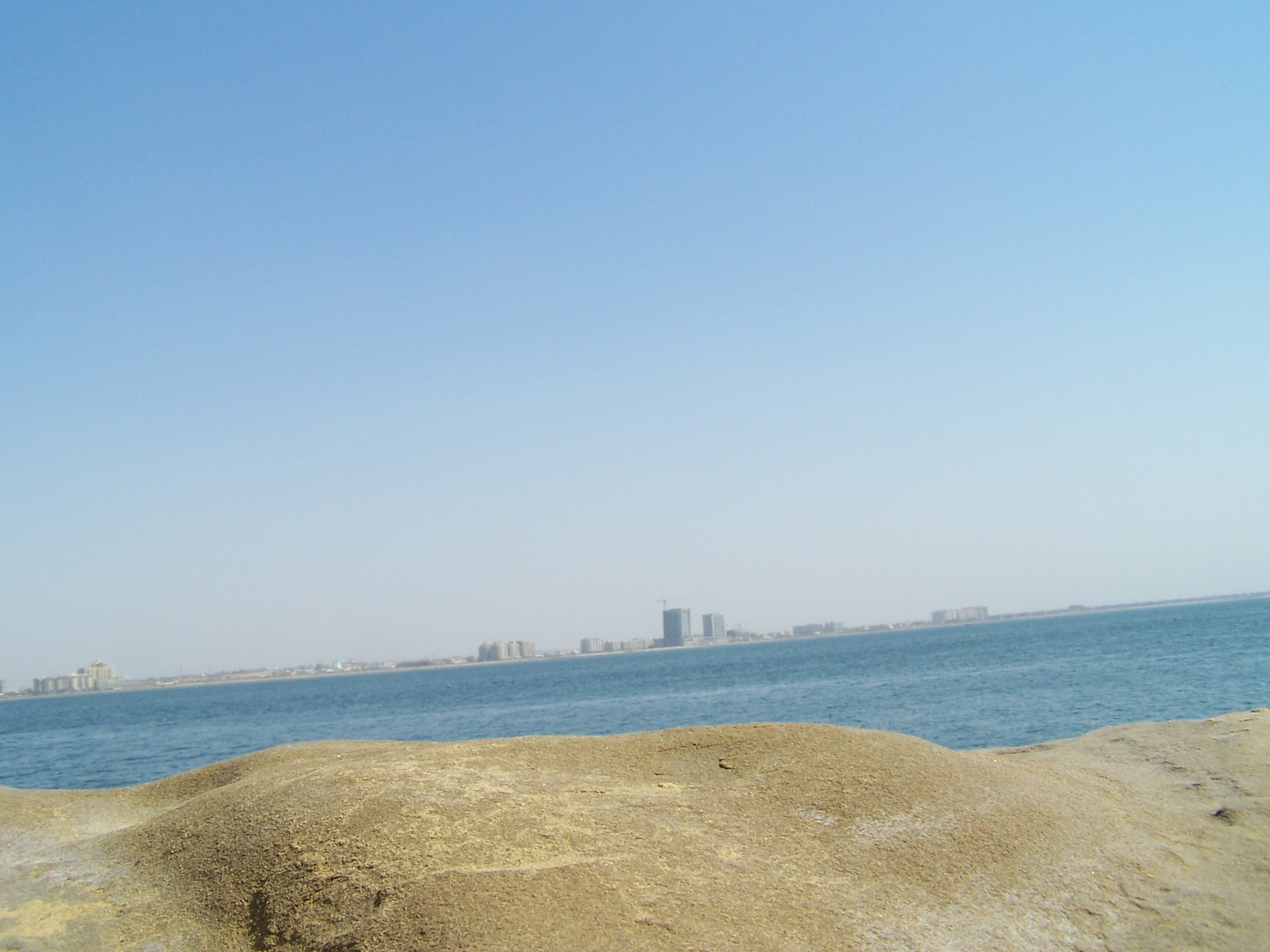
A view of Karachi seen from Oyster Rocks.

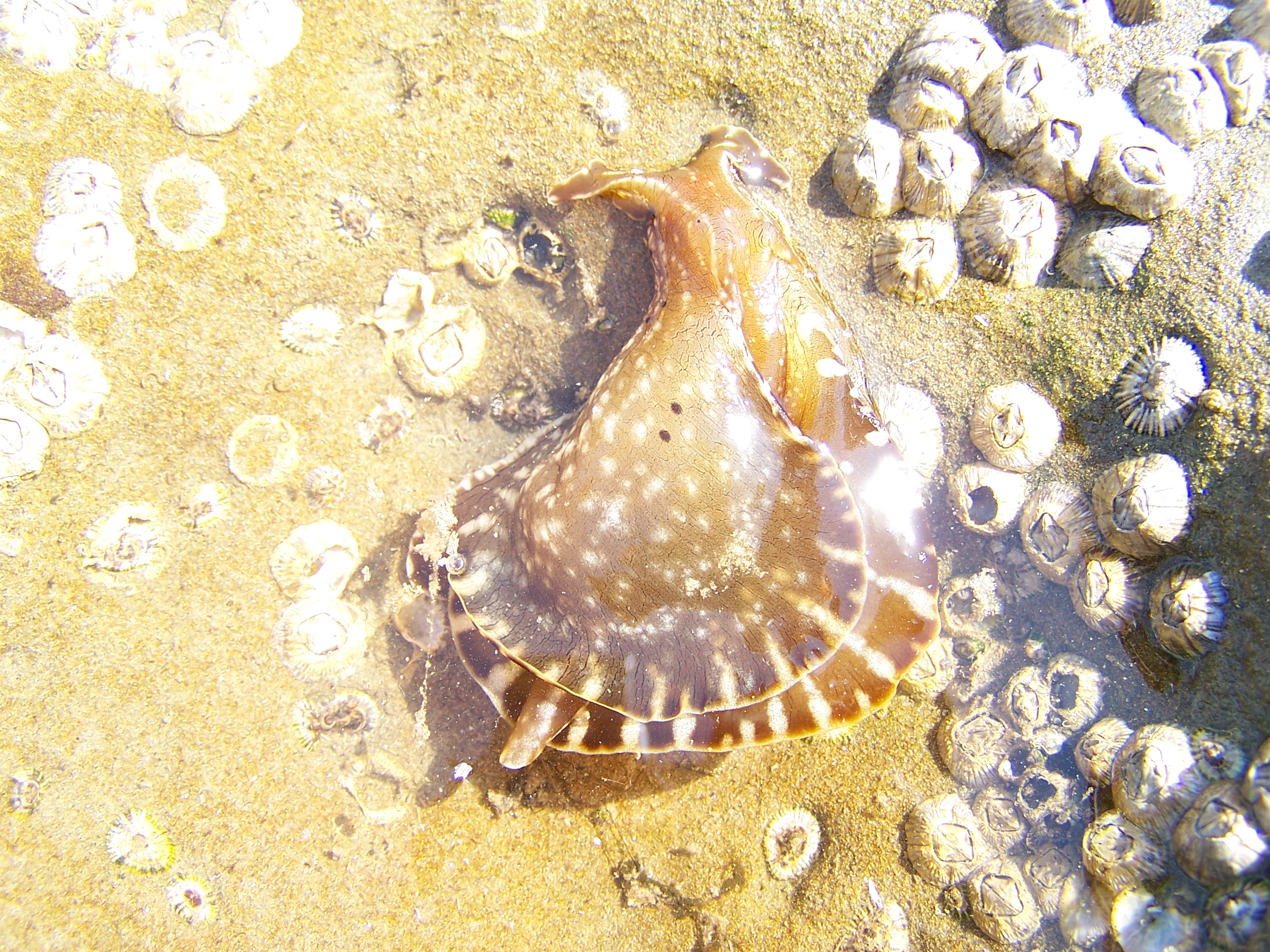
Sea life at Oyster Rocks

== See also ==
- List of islands of Pakistan
