= Sadanand Shetye =

Indian kabaddi player

Sadanand Shetye is an Indian Kabaddi player belonging to the state of Maharashtra. He has been a national player. He is an Arjun Awardee the first Kabaddi player to do so. He was given the award for 1972–73. He is the president of Vijay Bajrang Vyayam Shala, a Mumbai based sports institution.
