= Outline of Pakistan =

Country in South Asia

The Flag of Pakistan

The State emblem of Pakistan

Area controlled by Pakistan shown in dark green; claimed but uncontrolled territory shown in light green.

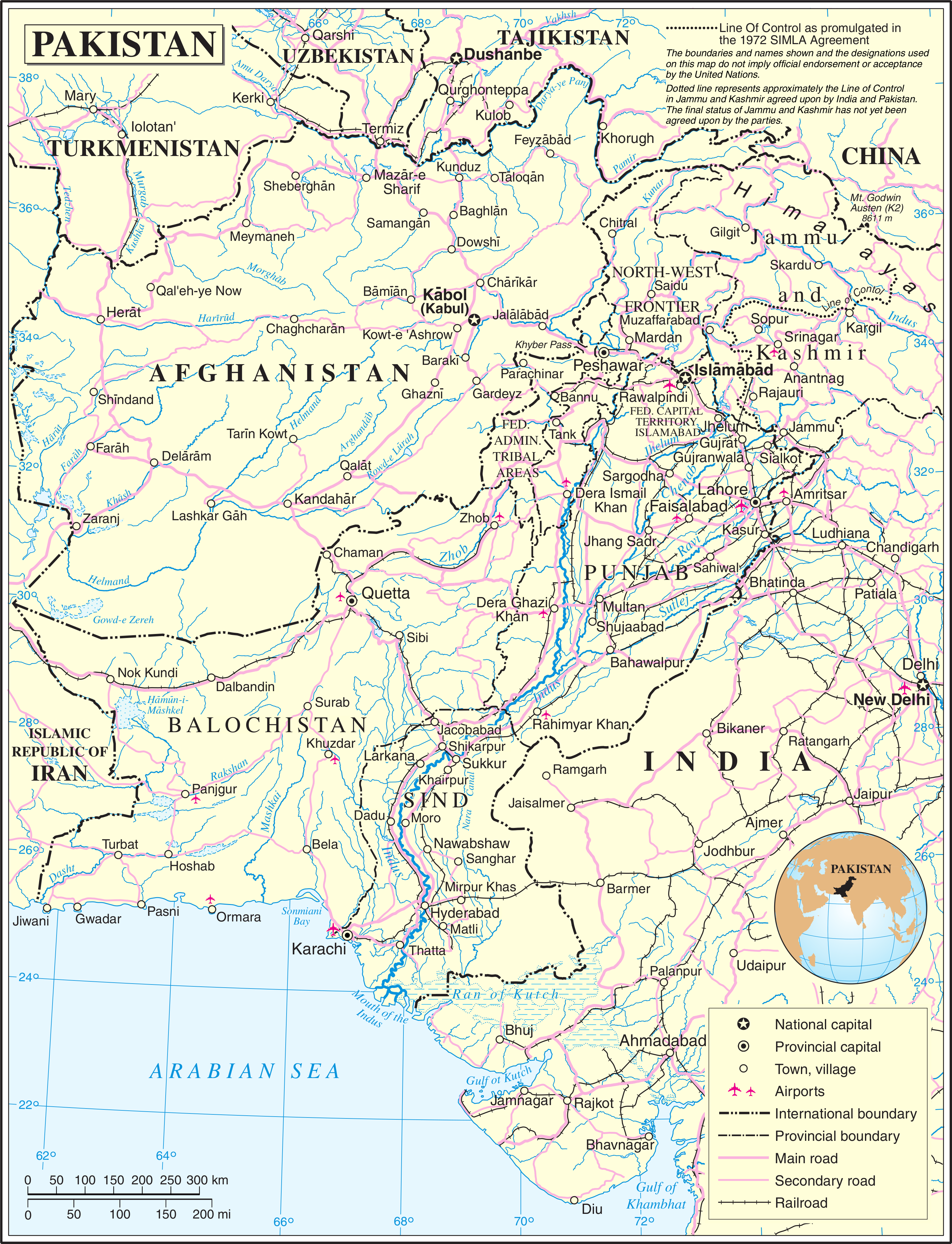
An enlargeable map of the Islamic Republic of Pakistan

The following outline is provided as an overview of and topical guide to Pakistan:

Pakistan – sovereign country located in South Asia. It has a 1,046 kilometres (650 mi) coastline along the Arabian Sea and Gulf of Oman in the south and is bordered by Afghanistan in the west, Iran in the southwest, India in the east and China in the far northeast.

== General reference ==
- Pronunciation: /ˌpɑːkɪˈstɑːn/
- Common English country name: Pakistan
- Official English country name: The Islamic Republic of Pakistan
- Common endonym(s):
- Official endonym(s): Islami Jumhuriyah-e-Pakistan
- Adjectival(s): Pakistani
- Demonym(s): Pakistani
- Etymology: Name of Pakistan
- International rankings of Pakistan
- ISO country codes: PK, PAK, 586
- ISO region codes: See ISO 3166-2:PK
- Internet country code top-level domain: .pk
- How to start business in Pakistan

== Geography of Pakistan ==
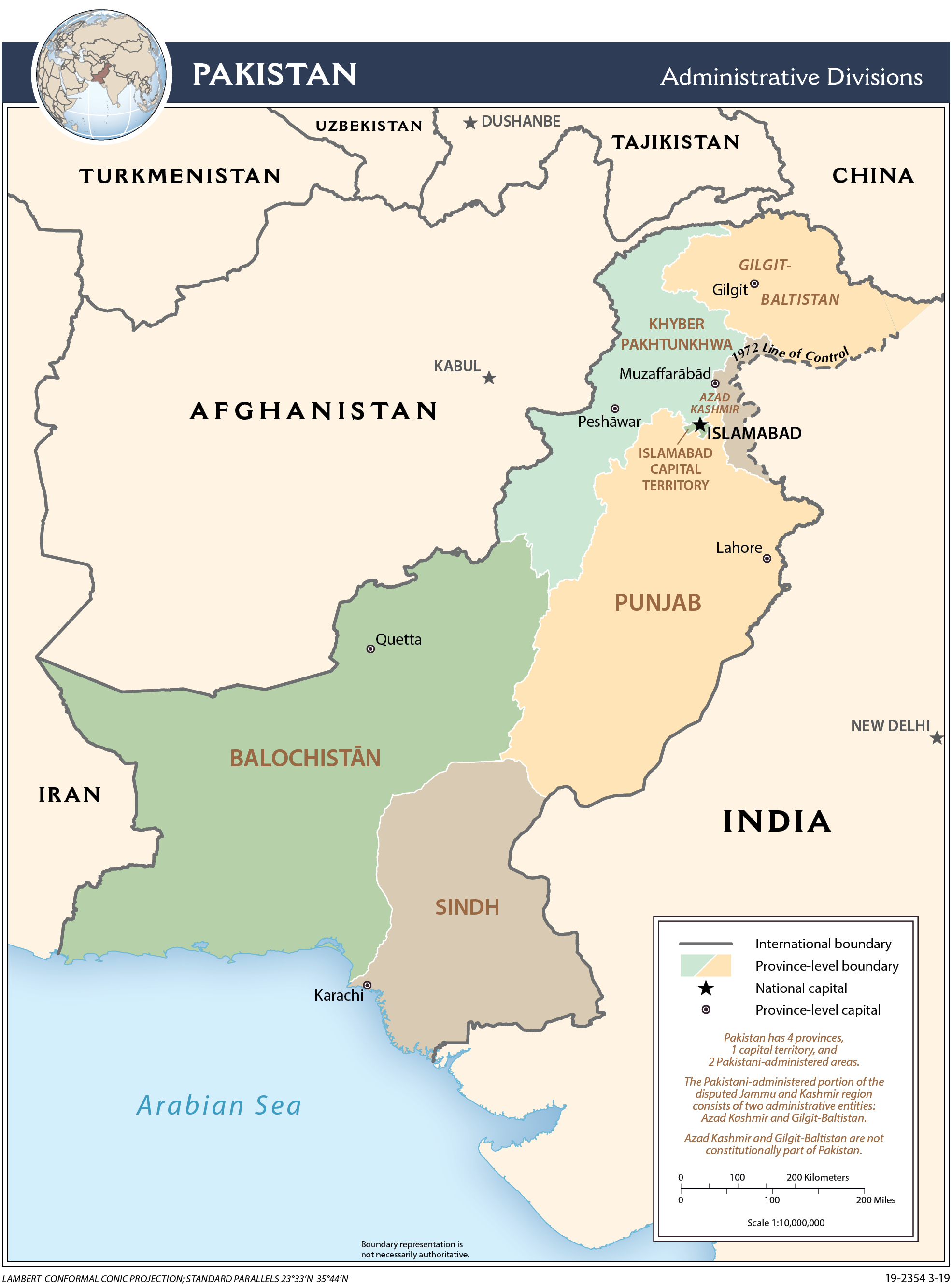
Pakistan Map

- Pakistan is:
  - Country | Middle Power
  - Sovereign state | Member of Organization of Islam
- Location:
  - Eastern Hemisphere
  - Northern Hemisphere
    - Eurasia
      - Asia
        - South Asia
          - Iranian Plateau
          - Indian subcontinent
  - Time in Pakistan
    - Time zone:Pakistan Standard Time (UTC+05)
  - Extreme points of Pakistan
    - High: K2 8,611 m (28,251 ft) – second highest peak on Earth
    - Low: Arabian Sea 0 m (0 ft)
  - Land boundaries: 7,307 km km

India – 3,323 km
Afghanistan – 2,430 km
Iran – 959 km
China – 595 km

- Coastline: 1,146 km | (Arabian Sea | Indian Ocean)

- Population of Pakistan: 219,347,294 (Census 2017) – 5th most populous country
- Area of Pakistan: 881,913 km^{2} (340,509 sq mi)(Excluding Claimed Territories) – 33rd largest country
- Atlas of Pakistan
- Subcontinent (Indian subcontinent)
- List of cities in Pakistan
- List of Union Councils in Pakistan

=== Environment of Pakistan ===
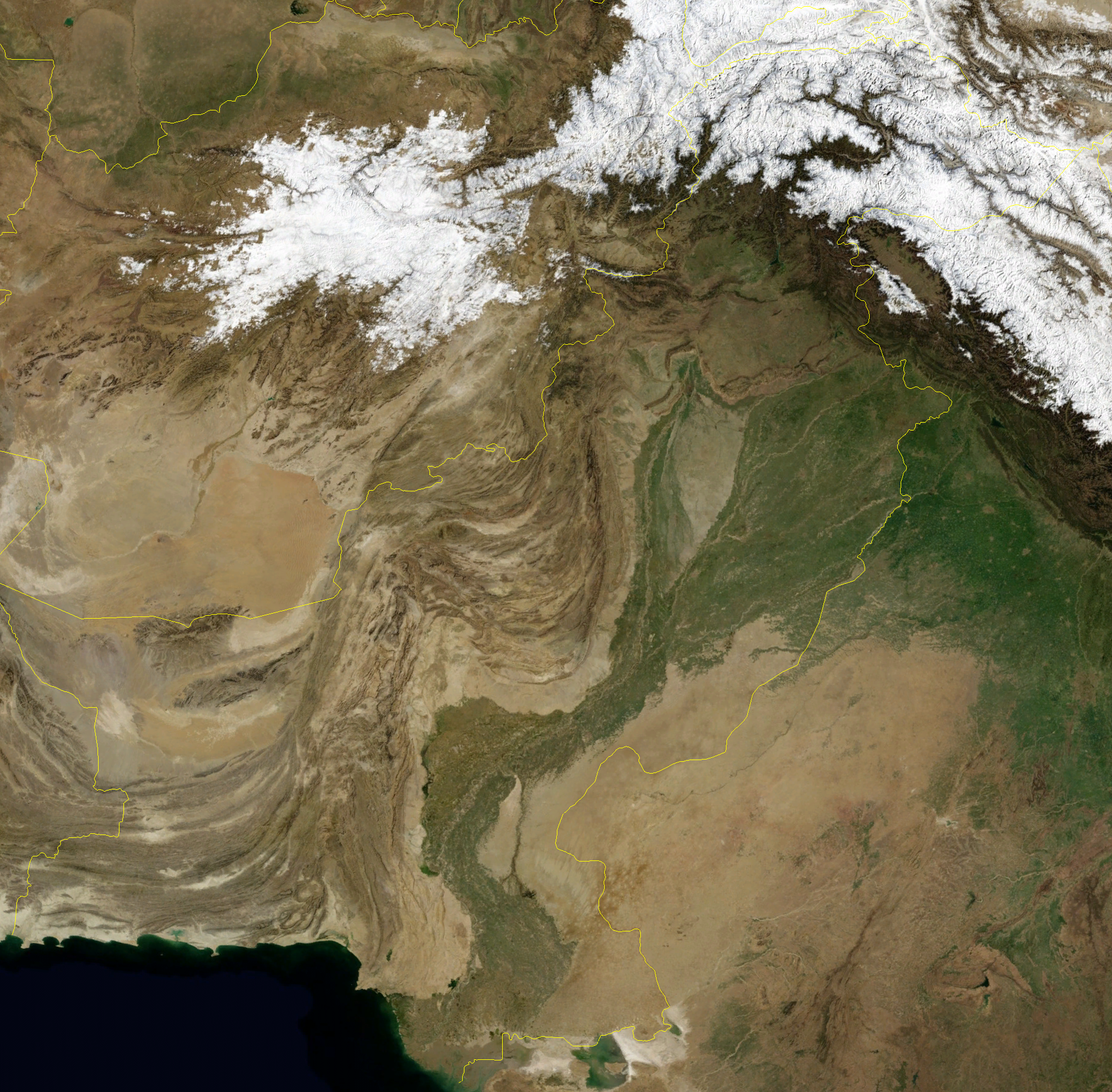
An enlargeable satellite image of Pakistan

- Climate of Pakistan
- Environmental issues in Pakistan
- Ecoregions in Pakistan
- Renewable energy in Pakistan
- Geology of Pakistan
  - Earthquakes in Pakistan
- Protected areas of Pakistan
  - Biosphere reserves of Pakistan
  - National parks of Pakistan
- Wildlife of Pakistan
  - Flora of Pakistan
  - Fauna of Pakistan
    - Birds of Pakistan
    - Butterflies of Pakistan
    - Spiders of Pakistan
    - Mammals of Pakistan
    - Fish of Pakistan
    - Amphibians of Pakistan
    - Reptiles of Pakistan

==== Geographic features of Pakistan ====
- Glaciers of Pakistan
- Islands of Pakistan
- Lakes of Pakistan
- Mountains of Pakistan
  - Volcanoes in Pakistan
- Rivers of Pakistan
  - Waterfalls of Pakistan
- Valleys of Pakistan
- List of World Heritage Sites in Pakistan

=== Administrative divisions of Pakistan ===
==== Provinces and territories Of Pakistan ====
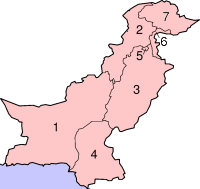
Pakistan's administrative units

- Provinces of Pakistan
  - By name:
    - Punjab, Pakistan
    - Sindh
    - Khyber Pakhtunkhwa
    - Balochistan, Pakistan
- Territories of Pakistan
    - Azad Kashmir
    - Gilgit-Baltistan
    - Islamabad

===== Divisions of Pakistan =====
Map of District and Tehsils in Pakistan

- Divisions of Punjab, Pakistan
  - Bahawalpur | Dera Ghazi Khan | Faisalabad | Gujranwala | Gujrat | Lahore | Mianwali | Multan | Rawalpindi | Sahiwal | Sargodha
- Divisions of Sindh
  - Hyderabad | Karachi | Sukkur | Larkana | Mirpur Khas | Shaheed Benazirabad
- Divisions of Khyber Pakhtunkhwa
  - Bannu | Dera Ismail Khan | Hazara | Kohat | Malakand | Mardan | Peshawar
- Divisions of Balochistan, Pakistan
  - Kalat | Makran | Nasirabad | Quetta | Rakhshan | Sibi | Zhob | Loralai
- Divisions of Azad Kashmir
  - Mirpur | Muzaffarabad | Poonch
- Divisions of Gilgit-Baltistan
  - Baltistan | Gilgit | Diamer

==== Districts of Pakistan ====
Districts of Pakistan

==== Municipalities of Pakistan ====
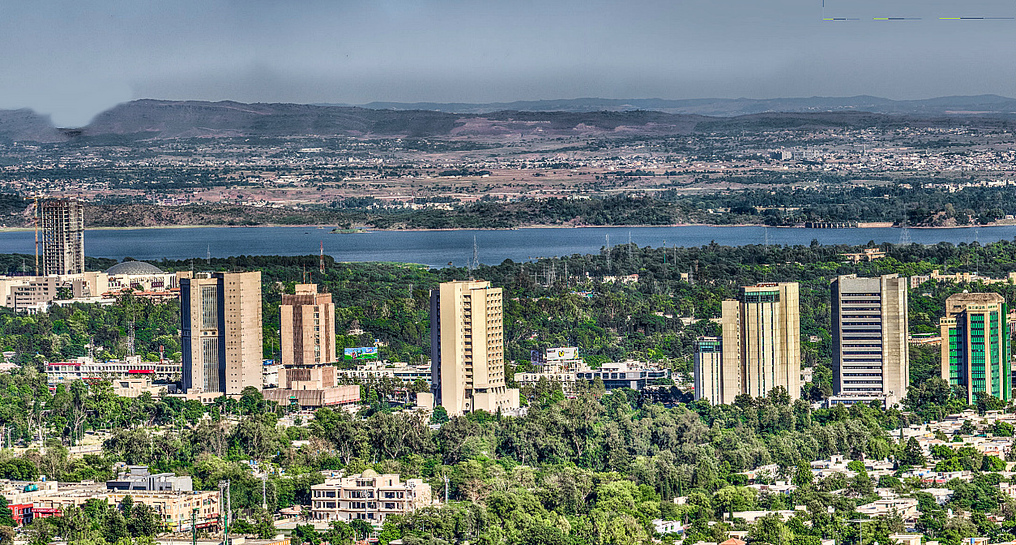
Islamabad skyline

- Capital of Pakistan: Islamabad
- Cantonments
- Cities of Pakistan

== Demography of Pakistan ==
Demographics of pakistan

- Ethnic groups in Pakistan
- Languages of Pakistan
- Religion in Pakistan

== Government and politics of Pakistan ==
- Form of government: Federal Islamic parliamentary republic
- Capital of Pakistan: Islamabad
- Elections in Pakistan
  - 1954 (indirect elections) = ML
  - 1962 (non-party based indirect elections)
  - 3rd elections : 1970 = AL
  - 4th elections : 1977 = PPP
  - 5th elections : 1985 = PML
  - 6th elections : 1988 = PPP
  - 7th elections : 1990 = IJI
  - 8th elections : 1993 = PPP
  - 9th elections : 1997 = PMLN
  - 10th elections : 2002 = PMLQ
  - 11th elections : 2008 = PPP
  - 12th elections : 2013 = PMLN
  - 13th elections : 2018 = PTI
  - 14th elections : 2024 = PMLN

=== Branches of the government of Pakistan ===
==== Executive of the government of Pakistan ====
- Head of state: President of Pakistan, Asif Ali Zardari
- Head of government: Prime Minister of Pakistan, Shehbaz Sharif
  - Part of Government: Cabinet of Pakistan | Cabinet Secretary of Pakistan

==== Legislature of the government of Pakistan ====
- Parliament of Pakistan
  - Senate of Pakistan (Aiwān-e-Bālā Pākistān) - upper house of the parliament (Chairman of the Senate of Pakistan)
  - National Assembly (Aiwān-e-Zairīñ Pākistān) - lower house of the parliament (Speaker of the National Assembly of Pakistan)

==== Judiciary of the government of Pakistan ====
- Supreme Court of Pakistan (Chief Justice of Pakistan)
- High Courts of Pakistan
- District Courts of Pakistan

=== Foreign relations of Pakistan ===
- Diplomatic missions in Pakistan
- Diplomatic missions of Pakistan
- India-Pakistan relations
- Pakistan and the Commonwealth of Nations

=== International organization membership ===
The Islamic Republic of Pakistan is a member of:

- African Union/United Nations Hybrid operation in Darfur (UNAMID)
- Asian Development Bank (ADB)
- Association of Southeast Asian Nations Regional Forum (ARF)
- Colombo Plan (CP)
- Commonwealth of Nations
- Economic Cooperation Organization (ECO)
- Food and Agriculture Organization (FAO)
- Group of 24 (G24)
- Group of 77 (G77)
- International Atomic Energy Agency (IAEA)
- International Bank for Reconstruction and Development (IBRD)
- International Chamber of Commerce (ICC)
- International Civil Aviation Organization (ICAO)
- International Criminal Court (ICCt)
- International Criminal Police Organization (Interpol)
- International Development Association (IDA)
- International Federation of Red Cross and Red Crescent Societies (IFRCS)
- International Finance Corporation (IFC)
- International Fund for Agricultural Development (IFAD)
- International Hydrographic Organization (IHO)
- International Labour Organization (ILO)
- International Maritime Organization (IMO)
- International Mobile Satellite Organization (IMSO)
- International Monetary Fund (IMF)
- International Olympic Committee (IOC)
- International Organization for Migration (IOM)
- International Organization for Standardization (ISO)
- International Telecommunication Union (ITU)
- International Telecommunications Satellite Organization (ITSO)
- International Trade Union Confederation (ITUC)
- Inter-Parliamentary Union (IPU)
- Islamic Development Bank (IDB)
- Multilateral Investment Guarantee Agency (MIGA)
- Nonaligned Movement (NAM)
- Organisation of Islamic Cooperation (OIC)
- Organisation for the Prohibition of Chemical Weapons (OPCW)
- Organization of American States (OAS) (observer)
- Partnership for Peace (PFP)
- Shanghai Cooperation Organisation (SCO)
- South Asia Co-operative Environment Programme (SACEP)
- South Asian Association for Regional Cooperation (SAARC)
- United Nations (UN)
- United Nations Conference on Trade and Development (UNCTAD)
- United Nations Educational, Scientific, and Cultural Organization (UNESCO)
- United Nations High Commissioner for Refugees (UNHCR)
- United Nations Industrial Development Organization (UNIDO)
- United Nations Integrated Mission in Timor-Leste (UNMIT)
- United Nations Mission for the Referendum in Western Sahara (MINURSO)
- United Nations Mission in Liberia (UNMIL)
- United Nations Mission in the Central African Republic and Chad (MINURCAT)
- United Nations Mission in the Sudan (UNMIS)
- United Nations Observer Mission in Georgia (UNOMIG)
- United Nations Operation in Cote d'Ivoire (UNOCI)
- United Nations Organization Mission in the Democratic Republic of the Congo (MONUC)
- Universal Postal Union (UPU)
- World Confederation of Labour (WCL)
- World Customs Organization (WCO)
- World Federation of Trade Unions (WFTU)
- World Health Organization (WHO)
- World Intellectual Property Organization (WIPO)
- World Meteorological Organization (WMO)
- World Tourism Organization (UNWTO)
- World Trade Organization (WTO)

=== Law and order in Pakistan ===
- Capital punishment in Pakistan
- Constitution of Pakistan
- Crime in Pakistan
  - Organised crime in Pakistan
  - Human trafficking in Pakistan
  - Terrorism in Pakistan
  - Gambling in Pakistan
- Human rights in Pakistan
  - LGBT rights in Pakistan
  - Forced disappearance in Pakistan
  - Feudalism in Pakistan
  - Religious discrimination in Pakistan
  - Blasphemy in Pakistan
  - Domestic violence in Pakistan
  - Child labour in Pakistan
  - Women-related laws in Pakistan
  - Fundamental rights in Pakistan
  - Freedom of religion in Pakistan
- Law enforcement in Pakistan

==== Police ====
- Islamabad Police
- Balochistan Police
- Khyber Pakhtunkhwa Police
- Gilgit-Baltistan Police
- Azad Kashmir Police
- Sindh Police
- Punjab Police

=== Pakistan Armed Forces ===
- Leadership
  - Commander-in-chief – President of Pakistan
  - Ministry of Defence of Pakistan
  - National Security Council (Pakistan)
    - Minister of Defence (Pakistan)
    - Defence Secretary of Pakistan
    - Joint Chiefs of Staff Committee
    - Chief of Army Staff (Pakistan)
    - Chief of Naval Staff (Pakistan)
    - Chief of Air Staff (Pakistan)
- Forces
- Inter-Services
  - Inter-Services Intelligence
  - Inter-Services Public Relations
  - Inter-Services Selection Board
  - Strategic Plans Division Force
  - Pakistan Armed Forces Band
- Pakistan Army
  - Special Service Group
  - National Guard (Pakistan)
- Pakistan Navy
  - Pakistan Maritime Security Agency
  - Pakistan Marines
  - Special Service Group (Navy)
- Pakistan Air Force
  - Special Services Wing

=== Civil Armed Forces ===
- Frontier Corps Khyber Pakhtunkhwa (North)
- Frontier Corps Khyber Pakhtunkhwa (South)
- Frontier Corps Balochistan (North)
- Frontier Corps Balochistan (South)
- Frontier Constabulary
- Gilgit-Baltistan Scouts
- Pakistan Rangers
- Pakistan Coast Guards

== History of Pakistan ==
- Ancient Civilizations
  - Indus Valley civilization (3300–1700 BCE)
  - Late Harappan culture (1700–1300 BCE)
- Islamic empires (1206–1858)
  - Delhi Sultanate (1206–1596)
  - Mughal Empire (1526–1858)
- Colonial India (1858–1947)
  - British Raj
  - Princely states
- Pakistan Movement
  - Two-nation theory (Pakistan)
  - Partition of India (1947)
- Timeline of Pakistani history (1947–present)
- History of the Islamic Republic of Pakistan
- Economic history of Pakistan
- Military history of Pakistan

== Culture of Pakistan ==
- Architecture of Pakistan
- Cuisine of Pakistan
- Ethnic minorities in Pakistan
- Languages of Pakistan
- Media in Pakistan
- National symbols of Pakistan
  - Coat of arms of Pakistan
  - Flag of Pakistan
  - National anthem of Pakistan
- People of Pakistan
- Prostitution in Pakistan
- Public holidays in Pakistan
- Religion in Pakistan
  - Buddhism in Pakistan
  - Christianity in Pakistan
  - Hinduism in Pakistan
  - Islam in Pakistan
    - Ahmadiyya in Pakistan
  - Judaism in Pakistan
  - Sikhism in Pakistan
- List of World Heritage Sites in Pakistan
- Tribes in Khyber Pakhtunkhwa
  - Afridi
  - Orakzai
  - Bangash
  - Khattak
  - Mahsud
  - Marwat
  - Mohmand
  - Wazir
  - Yusufzai
- Tribes in Balochistan
  - Baloch people
  - Hazara people
- Tribes in Sindh
  - Bhil
  - Kolhi
  - Sami people
  - Khati
  - Bhangi
  - Rabari
  - Charan
  - Sati
  - Lohar
- Tribes in Gilgit-Baltistan
  - Balti people
  - Shina people
  - Burusho people
  - Dard people
  - Domba
  - Yashkuns
- Tribes in Punjab (Category:Punjabi tribes)

=== Art in Pakistan ===
- Cinema of Pakistan
- Literature of Pakistan
- Music of Pakistan
- Television in Pakistan
- Theatre in Pakistan

=== Sports in Pakistan ===
- Pakistan men's national field hockey team
- Cricket in Pakistan
- Polo in Pakistan
- Football in Pakistan
- Squash in Pakistan
- Billiards in Pakistan
- Tour de Pakistan
- Pakistan national kabaddi team
- Pakistan at the Olympics
- National Games of Pakistan
- Pakistan at the Commonwealth Games
- Pakistan at the Asian Games
- South Asian Games
- Cricket World Cup
- Men's FIH Hockey World Cup

== Economy and infrastructure of Pakistan ==
- Economic rank, by nominal GDP (2019): 40th (forty)
- Agriculture in Pakistan
- Banking in Pakistan
  - National Bank of Pakistan
- Communications in Pakistan
  - Internet in Pakistan
- Companies of Pakistan
- Currency of Pakistan: Rupee
  - ISO 4217: PKR
- Economic history of Pakistan
- Energy in Pakistan
  - Energy policy of Pakistan
  - Petroleum industry in Pakistan
- Health care in Pakistan
  - Family planning in Pakistan
- Mining in Pakistan
- Pakistan Stock Exchange
- Tourism in Pakistan
- Transport in Pakistan
  - Airports in Pakistan
  - Rail transport in Pakistan
  - Roads in Pakistan
- Water supply and sanitation in Pakistan

== Education in Pakistan ==
- List of schools in Pakistan
- List of universities in Pakistan
- List of colleges in Pakistan
- List of special education institutions in Pakistan
- List of research institutes in Pakistan
- Madrassas in Pakistan

== See also ==
- Pakistan
- Ba'ab-ul-Islam
- List of international rankings
- List of Pakistan-related topics
- Member state of the Commonwealth of Nations
- Member state of the United Nations
- Outline of Asia
- Outline of geography
