= Industry in Pakistan =

Pakistan's industrial sector (in FY21) accounts for 18.11% of the GDP. Of this, manufacturing makes up 12.52%, mining constitutes 2.18%, construction makes up 2.05%, and electricity and gas 1.36%. The majority of industry is made up of textile units, with textiles contributing $15.4b to exports, making up 56% of total exports. Other units include surgical instruments, chemicals, and a budding automotive industry. Pakistan's inadequately developed labor market, unable to absorb the increasing number of educated workers, has resulted in a high rate of unemployment among graduates.

== History ==
Pakistan, which had almost no large industrial units at the time of partition in 1947, now has a fairly broad industrial base, and manufacturing accounts for about 17 percent of GDP. Cotton textile production is the single most important industry, accounting for about 19 percent of large-scale industrial employment. Cotton yarn, cotton cloth, made-up textiles, ready-made garments, and knitwear collectively accounted for nearly 60 percent of Pakistan's exports in 1999-2000. Other important industries are cement, vegetable oil, fertilizer, sugar, steel, machinery, tobacco, paper and paperboard, chemicals, and food processing. The government is attempting to diversify the country's industrial base and increase the emphasis on export industries. Small-scale and cottage industries are numerically significant but account for a relatively small proportion of the GDP at about 6 percent. Small-scale industry includes facilities, which employ fewer than 50 workers, and cottage industries (industrial units in which the owner works and is aided by family members but employs no hired labor). In 1999, industrial production grew by 3.9 percent.

Since the mid-1960s, the industrial sector has produced 19 to 25 percent of gross domestic product (GDP), accounting for 28.5 percent of GDP in 2004. Manufacturing and construction dominate the industrial sector, accounting for around 19 percent of GDP. Since the 1980s, approximately 17 to 20 percent of the working population has been employed in the industrial sector (25 percent in 2004), mostly in manufacturing and construction. Although the industrial base has diversified since independence, the production base depends heavily on textiles and sugar. Manufacturing output is therefore vulnerable to adverse weather conditions and fluctuations in international prices for cotton and sugar. Various liberalization reforms have been pursued since the early 1980s but have been hindered by substantial corruption, frequent raw material shortages, the government's tendency to provide generous concessions to particular sectors (such as sugar refining and yarn spinning), and a burdensome tax structure that has helped promote the development of the informal economy.

It is estimated that due to insufficiency, Pakistan loses about 5 to 6 percent of its GDP (approximately $6 billion). Logistical bottlenecks increase the cost of production of our goods by about 30 percent".

== Mining and quarrying ==
Pakistan has immense reserves of various minerals and natural resources. Important minerals found in Pakistan are gypsum, limestone, chromites, iron ore, rock salt, silver, gold, precious stones, gems, marble, copper, coal, graphite, sulphur, fire clay, silica. The salt range in Punjab Province has one of the largest deposit of pure salt founded in the world. Balochistan province is a mineral-rich area having substantial mineral, oil and gas reserves which have not been exploited to their full capacity or fully explored, recent government policies have begun to develop this region of the country and to tap into the immense resources found there. The province has significant quantities of copper, chromite and iron, and pockets of antimony and zinc in the south and gold in the far west. Natural gas was discovered near Sui in 1952, and the province has been gradually developing its oil and gas projects over the past fifty years.

Major reserves of copper and gold in Balochistan's Reko Diq area have been discovered in early 2006. The Reko Diq mining area has proven estimated reserves of 2 billion tons of copper and 20 million ounces of gold. According to the current market price, the value of the deposits has been estimated at $65 billion, which would generate thousands of jobs.

The discovery has ranked Rekodiq among the world's top seven copper reserves. The Rekodiq project is estimated to produce 200,000 tons of copper and 400,000 ounces of gold per year, at an estimated value of $1.25 billion at current market prices. The copper and gold are currently traded at about $5,000 per ton and $600 per ounce respectively in the international market. Khyber Pakhtunkhwa Province accounts for at least 78% of the marble production in Pakistan. Pakistan is home to some of the most finest and purest grades of marble, granite and slate found in the world. Much of the grades A Marble that is exported out of European countries like Italy actually have their origins in Pakistan which previously lacked fine polishing and processing machinery. The Government has taken steps to invest in this crucial sector with the recent establishment of a Marble City within Balochistan.

The industry currently employs 0.15% of the workforce, constituting 2.18% of the GDP, around $6.5b. The sector registered a -6.49% recession in FY21.

== Fuel extraction industry ==
Pakistan's first oil field was discovered in the late 1952 in Balochistan near a giant gas field at Sui in Balochistan. The Toot oilfield was discovered in the early 1960s Islamabad in the Punjab. Production has steadily increased since then. All of the country's crude oil production gets refined at local oil refineries. There are five main oil refineries in Pakistan with a combined processing capacity of approximately 450,000 barrels per day (bpd). Cnergyico Pk Limited is the largest oil refiner with a total installed capacity of 156,000 barrels per day.

Pakistan's first gas field was the giant gas field at Sui in Balochistan which was discovered in the late 1952. Pakistan is also a major producer of bituminous coal, sub-bituminous coal and lignite. Coal mining started in the British colonial era and has continued to be used by Pakistani industries after independence in 1947.

Pakistan produces about 40 to 45 tonnes uranium annually.

== Manufacturing ==
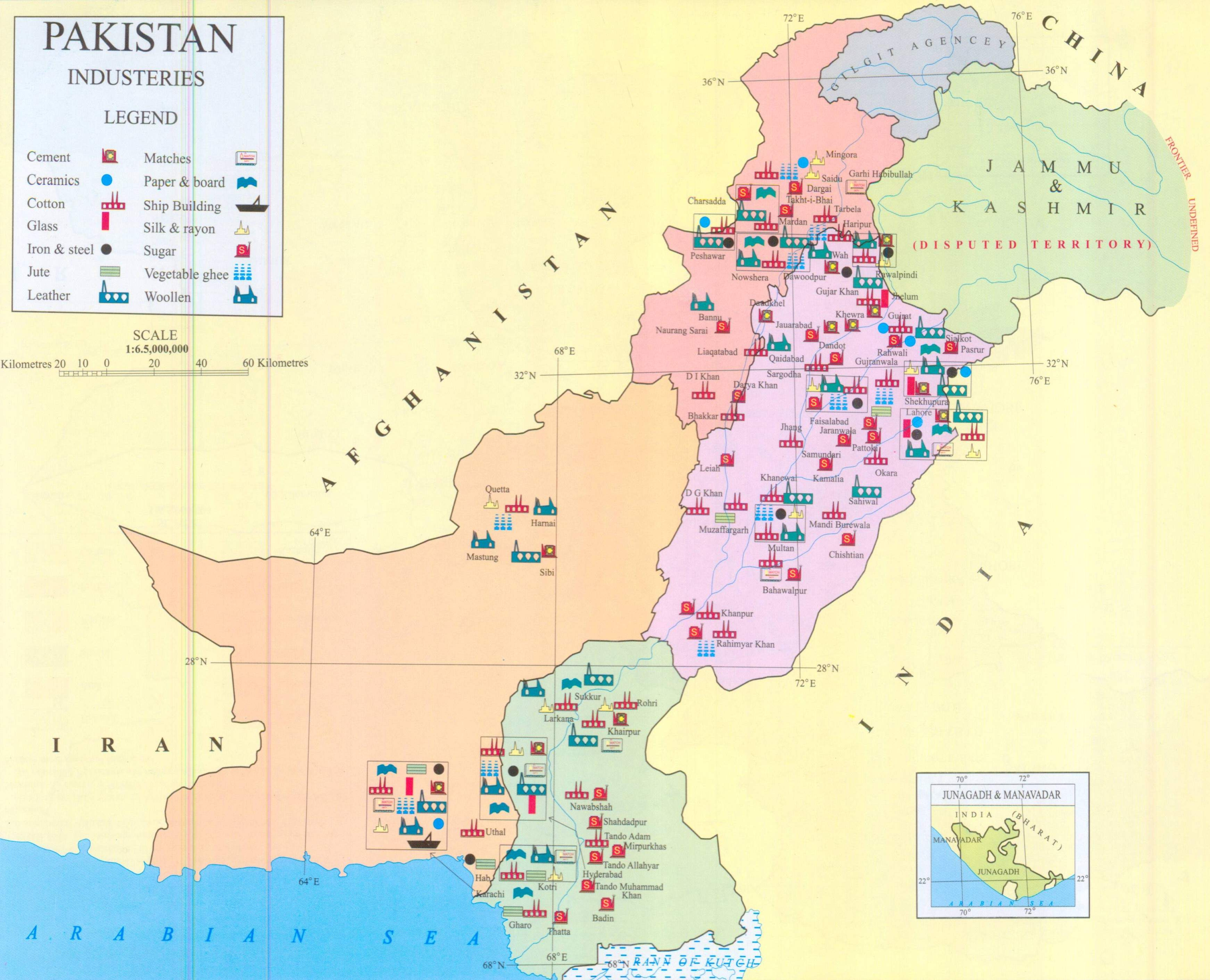
Industrial map of Pakistan

Pakistan's manufacturing sector is dominated by textiles, food, beverages, tobacco, coke and petroleum, and pharmaceuticals. The manufacturing sector is made up of three 'parts': Large Scale Manufacturing (LSM), Small Scale Manufacturing (SSM), and slaughtering. Large Scale Manufacturing at 9.73% of GDP dominates the overall manufacturing sector, accounting for 76.1% of the sectoral share followed by Small Scale Manufacturing, which accounts for 2.12% of total GDP and 16.6% sectoral share. The third component, slaughtering, accounts for 0.94% of GDP with 7.4% sectoral share. As a whole, the manufacturing sector is 12.79% of GDP, and employs 16.1% of the labor force.

The manufacturing sector was hard-hit by the COVID-19 outbreak and subsequent lockdown(s). Mobility restrictions resulted in labor problems, while the international supply chain disruption depressed natural resource imports. The LSM sector, most reliant on these two factors, contracted 10.12% as a result. The SSM managed to grow by 1.50%, not as badly reliant or affected by these factors, while the slaughtering sector grew as normal. In FY21, when restrictions were relaxed or removed, the sector rebounded with 9.29% growth. This was largely the result of the Temporary Economic Refinance Facility (TERF). As a result, Pakistan recorded $14.4B textile exports; the highest ever.

Manufacturing growth
Sector	FY19	FY20	FY21
LSM	-2.60%	-10.12%	9.29%
SSM	8.24%	1.50%	8.31%
Slaughtering	3.54%	4.05%	3.89%

=== Textiles ===
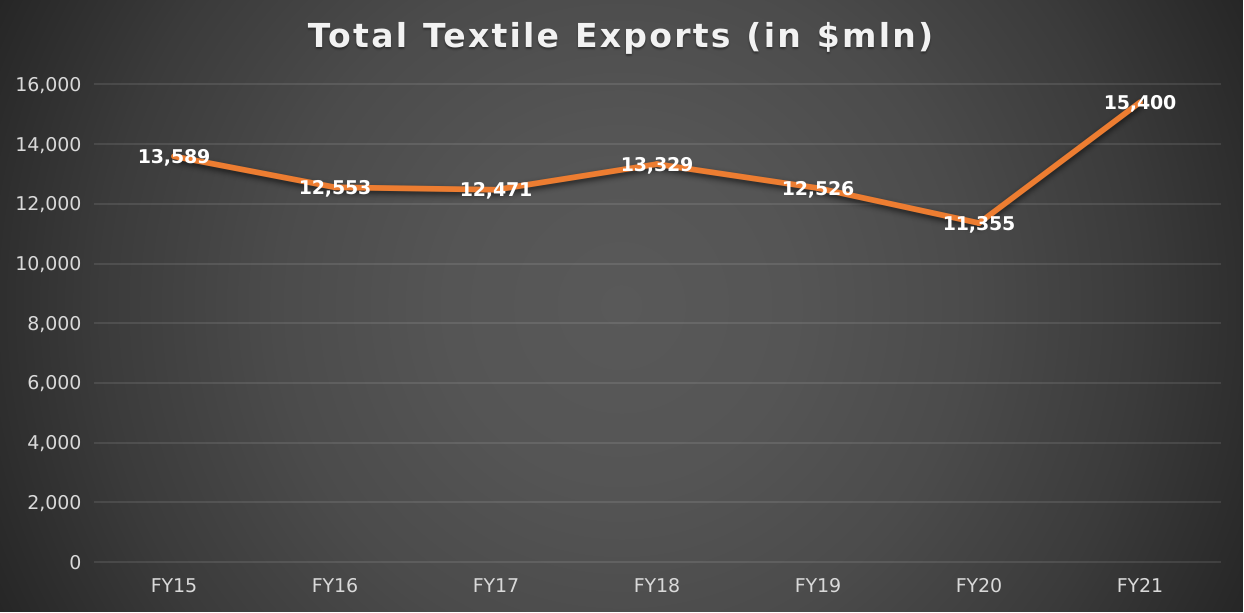
Total textile exports of Pakistan from FY15-21 in $mln

Textiles are the back of Pakistan's manufacturing base, contributing $15.4b to exports, making up 56% of total exports, and employing 40% of the labor force. Pakistan is the 8th largest exporter of textiles in Asia, and the 4th largest producer of cotton in the world. With increasing urbanization, and a growing middle-class, textiles have come under greater demand.

The majority of the industry is located in Sindh and Punjab, especially north Punjab with the cities of Sialkot and Faisalabad being notable centers.

== Automotive industry ==
Pakistan's automotive industry is one of the fastest growing industries of the country, accounting for 4% of Pakistan's GDP and employing a workforce of over 1,800,000.00 people. Currently there are over 3200 automotive manufacturing plants in the country, with an investment of Rs. 92 billion (US$330 million) producing 1.8 million motorcycles and 200,000 vehicles annually. Its contribution to the national exchequer is nearly Rs. 50 billion (US$180 million). The sector, as a whole, provides employment to 3.5 million people and plays a pivotal role in promoting the growth of the vendor industry. Pakistan's auto market is considered among the smallest, but fastest growing in South Asia. Over 180,000 cars were sold in the fiscal year 2014–15, rising to 206,777 units fiscal year 2015–16. this is an old data, please verify before publish

== Technology ==
Pakistan has huge potential for the technology industry, which includes software development and electronics manufacturing. Pakistan Aeronautical Complex recently started the manufacturing of tablet PCs, e-book readers, and notebooks in collaboration with INNAVTEK of China. Software development also has a huge potential, which is being utilized as a result of numerous projects initiated by the Government of Pakistan.

== Construction ==
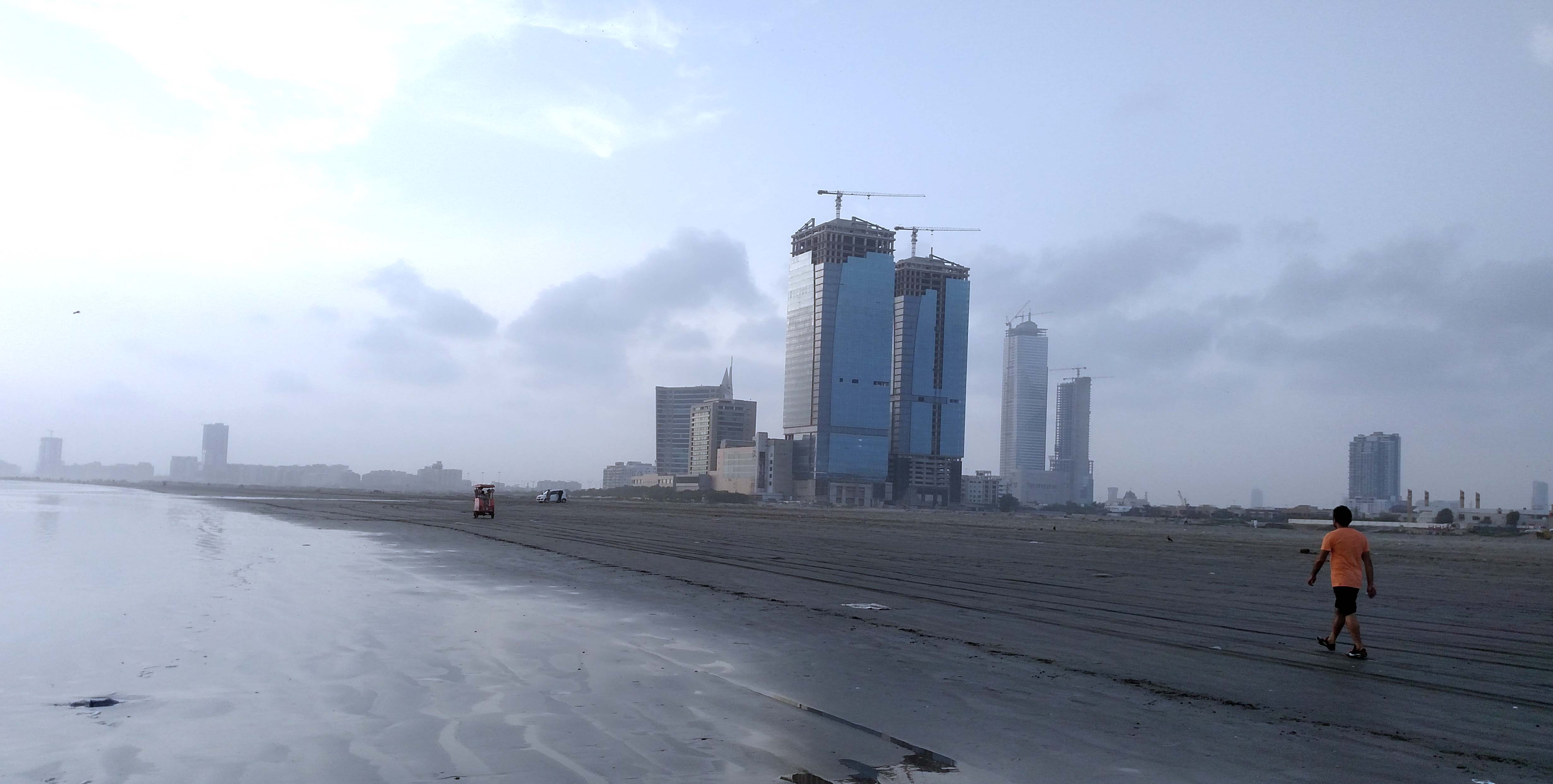
Modern high-rises under construction at Clifton Beach, Karachi, Pakistan. Clifton area is fast becoming residential and commercial hub of Karachi.

After the devastating 2005 Kashmir earthquake Pakistan has instituted stricter building codes. The cost of construction in Pakistan was projected to increase by 30 to 50% due to implementation of a new building code which required strengthening of structures to withstand earthquake of 8 to 8.5 magnitude. The demand for cement increased due to reconstruction after the earthquake. The price of cement increased by 50% and Pakistan government banned export of cement to lower the prices and the reconstruction costs.

Dubai Ports World, announced on 1 June 2006 that it will spend $10 billion to develop transport infrastructure and real estate in Pakistan. Dubai Ports World is also discussing the possibility of the company taking over operational management of Gwadar port in Balochistan.

Emaar Properties, announced three real estate developments in the cities of Islamabad and Karachi on 31 May 2006. The projects, with a total investment of $2.4 billion, will include a series of master planned communities that will set new benchmarks in commercial, residential and retail property within Pakistan.

In addition the conglomerate signed an unprecedented $43 billion deal in 2006 to develop two island resorts - Bundal Island and Buddo Island - over the next decade.

The Federal Bureau of Statistics provisionally valued this sector at Rs.178,819 million in 2005 thus registering over 88% growth since 2000.

== Electricity, gas and water supply ==
Pakistan has extensive energy resources, including fairly sizable natural gas reserves, some proven oil reserves, coal (Pakistan has the largest coal reserves in the world), and a large hydropower potential. However, the exploitation of energy resources has been slow due to a shortage of capital and domestic political constraints. Domestic petroleum production totals only about half the country's oil needs, and the need to import oil has contributed to Pakistan's trade deficits and past shortages of foreign exchange.

The current government has announced that privatization in the oil and gas sector is a priority, as is the substitution of indigenous gas for imported oil, especially in the production of power. Pakistan is a world leader in the use of compressed natural gas (CNG) for personal automobiles.

The short-term national energy demand has expanded significantly since 2001 due to massive rise in sales of durable goods like refrigerators, washing machines, split air conditioners, et al. In 2004, Access Group International announced plans to invest $1 billion over the next 5 years in solar cell manufacture and wind farms. MOUs have been signed with Alternate Energy Development Board. In early 2005, the government approved a 25-year Energy Security Plan to boost electric capacity eightfold.

The Canadian conglomerate Cathy Oil and Gas signed a memorandum of understanding in late 2006 to invest $5 billion in oil and gas exploration, development, production and commercialisation in Pakistan.

The World Bank estimates that it takes about 32 days only to get an electrical connection in Pakistan.

The Federal Bureau of Statistics provisionally valued this sector at Rs.215,662 million in 2005 thus registering over 62% growth since 2000.

== See also ==
- Economy of Pakistan
- Ministry of Commerce (Pakistan)
- List of companies of Pakistan
- International rankings of Pakistan
- Cottage and small scale industries in Pakistan
