= Mach kachehri =

Sindhi folk culture tradition

Mach Kachehri (Sindhi: مَڇُ ڪَچَهِرِي) is a centuries-old Sindhi winter tradition, in which a group of people sit around a bonfire during winter season. It is commonly held in the countryside of the Pakistani province of Sindh, especially in the Thar Desert. During Mach Kachehri, an elder villager tells proverbs, riddles, and stories. It is also a time for attendees to discuss their problems with each other.

Mach Katchehri is traditional gathering in Sindh, Pakistan, which provides people to connect with each and everyone, it shows unity, brotherhood among the villagers. Nowadays this tradition is dying, people are in bad financial Crisis sue inflation in Pakistan. The new technology, gadgets has also affected this tradition and almost everybody has a smart phone and they watch videos and spent time on Social media. People rarely meet with each other.
