= Indus Journey =

Indus Journey: A Personal View of Pakistan is a book by Imran Khan that was first published in 1990.

The book documents his travel along the Indus River. The work presents Khan in the roles of a travel writer, tour guide, and amateur historian. The book provides a comprehensive overview of the river's path from its delta on the Arabian Sea to its source in the Himalayas. Accompanied by photographs by Mike Goldwater, the book explores geography, culture, and history.

Khan's motivation for writing the book stemmed from feedback indicating a lack of accessible literature on Pakistan for international audiences. He addresses topics such as conservation, ecological challenges, and socio-economic issues within the country. However, some reviewers have noted that the book predominantly focuses on historical aspects, with limited coverage of contemporary Pakistan's diversity and dynamics.

== Reception ==
The book has been reviewed by India Today, Far Eastern Economic Review, The Times of India, and South China Morning Post.
