= Pakistan Billiards and Snooker Federation =

Pakistani sport governing body

- Sport: Billiard sports
- Abbreviation: PBSF
- Founded: 1958
- Affiliation: International Billiards and Snooker Federation
- Headquarters: Karachi
- President: Munawwar Hussain Shaikh
- Secretary: Zulfiqar Ali Ramzi
- (Pakistan)

The Pakistan Billiards and Snooker Federation is the national governing body to develop and promote the sports of snooker and billiards in Pakistan. The Federation was formed in 1958.

The Federation is affiliated with the Pakistan Sports Board. and it is a member of the International Billiards and Snooker Federation.
