= Ratto Kot =

Historic fortification in Sindh

- رتو ڪوٽ; رتو کوٹ
- Muchaq Island, Indus River Delta, Sindh; Near Ibrahim Hyderi in Pakistan

Site information
- Type: Fortress
- Condition: Ruins buried in the mud
- Website: lostcitiesofthedelta.org/ratukot/

Location
- Coordinates: 24°45′3.96″N 67°13′55.92″E
- Area: 54.5 ha (135 acres)

Site history
- Built: Subject of historical inquiry
- Materials: Red baked clay bricks

Ratto Kot (Sindhi: رتو ڪوٽ; Urdu: رتو کوٹ, Red Fort), also Ratukot, is an archaeological site situated on Muchaq Island, also known as Buddo Island, in the Indus River Delta, approximately 10 kilometres south of Ibrahim Hyderi, Sindh, Pakistan. The island, a consolidated sandbar formed over millennia, consists of mudflats and mangrove forests, providing a unique setting for the fortification. Ratto Kot lies completely buried in the mud and its origins remain uncertain.

== Etymology ==
Ratto Kot, also known as "Red Castle," derives its name from the Sindhi word Ratto, meaning red. The origin of the name is debated. Some attribute it to the red baked clay bricks used in its construction, while others link it to Raton, an 18th-century governor of Thatta. Another theory associates the name with a historical massacre at the site.

== Architecture and structure ==
Spanning approximately 54.5 ha (135 acres) on the eastern side of the island, the fort is a square structure with walls standing 2–3 meters high, incorporating 25 semi-circular defensive towers and a fortified western entrance.

Near the fort, the remains of an ancient mosque and a baked clay tablet inscribed with plaited Kufic calligraphy and intricate arabesque motifs have been discovered. Found north of the mosque, this artifact provides valuable insight into the artistic and epigraphic traditions of the early Muslim period. Based on historical and architectural analysis, scholars suggest that Ratto Kot dates back to this formative era of Islamic rule in the region.

== Background ==
Archaeological evidence suggests that the site was occupied from the late Sassanian or early Islamic period to the 13th century. The fort's architectural features indicate Persian influences, with some scholars proposing it was a defensive outpost protecting trade routes near Banbhore. It was likely both a customs outpost and a strategic defensive stronghold, serving as a safeguard against marauding pirates and external incursions. Its size and positioning suggest it played a crucial role in controlling access to the waterways leading to Banbhore.

An archaeological survey of the coastal region has revealed the existence of some fortresses of the early Muslim period.

Later references to the fort emerge, suggesting intermittent use under the rule of the Ranas of the Dharaja state, one of several autonomous fiefdoms that emerged in the western deltaic region during the 18th century, amid the decline of the Mughal Empire. Today, the ruins of Ratto Kot remain a subject of historical inquiry, reflecting the region's layered history and strategic significance.
