= Pakistani (disambiguation) =

Pakistanis are the nationals and citizens of the Islamic Republic of Pakistan.

Pakistani may also refer to:

- as an adjective, something of, from or related to Pakistan
- Pakistani language

== See also ==
- Pakistan (disambiguation)
