= List of extreme points of Pakistan =

Extreme points of Pakistan

This is a list of the extreme points of Pakistan.

== Extreme points ==
Heading	Location	Administrative entity	Bordering entity	Coordinates (Note: Coordinates obtained from Google Earth. Google Earth makes use of the WGS84 geodetic reference system.)
North (disputed, administered)	Murkushi west of the Khunjerab Pass	Gilgit–Baltistan	Xinjiang, People's Republic of China	37.0837°N 74.6906°E
North (undisputed)	Tri-junction of Khyber Pakhtunkhwa, Gilgit-Baltistan and Afghanistan just to the east of Broghil Pass	Khyber Pakhtunkhwa	Badakhshan Province, Afghanistan / Gilgit-Baltistan	36.9116°N 73.6717°E
South	Keti Bunder South Wildlife Sanctuary, South Island near Sir Creek, Thatta	Sindh	Arabian Sea	23.7164°N 68.1636°E
East (disputed, administered)	near Gyong La, AGPL	Gilgit–Baltistan	Ladakh, India	35.0651°N 77.1202°E
East (undisputed)	near Gharota, Shakargarh Tehsil, Punjab	Punjab	Punjab, India	35.0651°N 77.1202°E
East (disputed, claimed)	Demchok, Ladakh	Ladakh, India	Tibet Autonomous Region, People's Republic of China	32.2688°N 75.3814°E
West	The point where Pakistan, Iran and Afghanistan meet in Balochistan, near Maki.	Balochistan	Iran & Afghanistan	29.8585°N 60.8746°E

== Extreme altitude ==
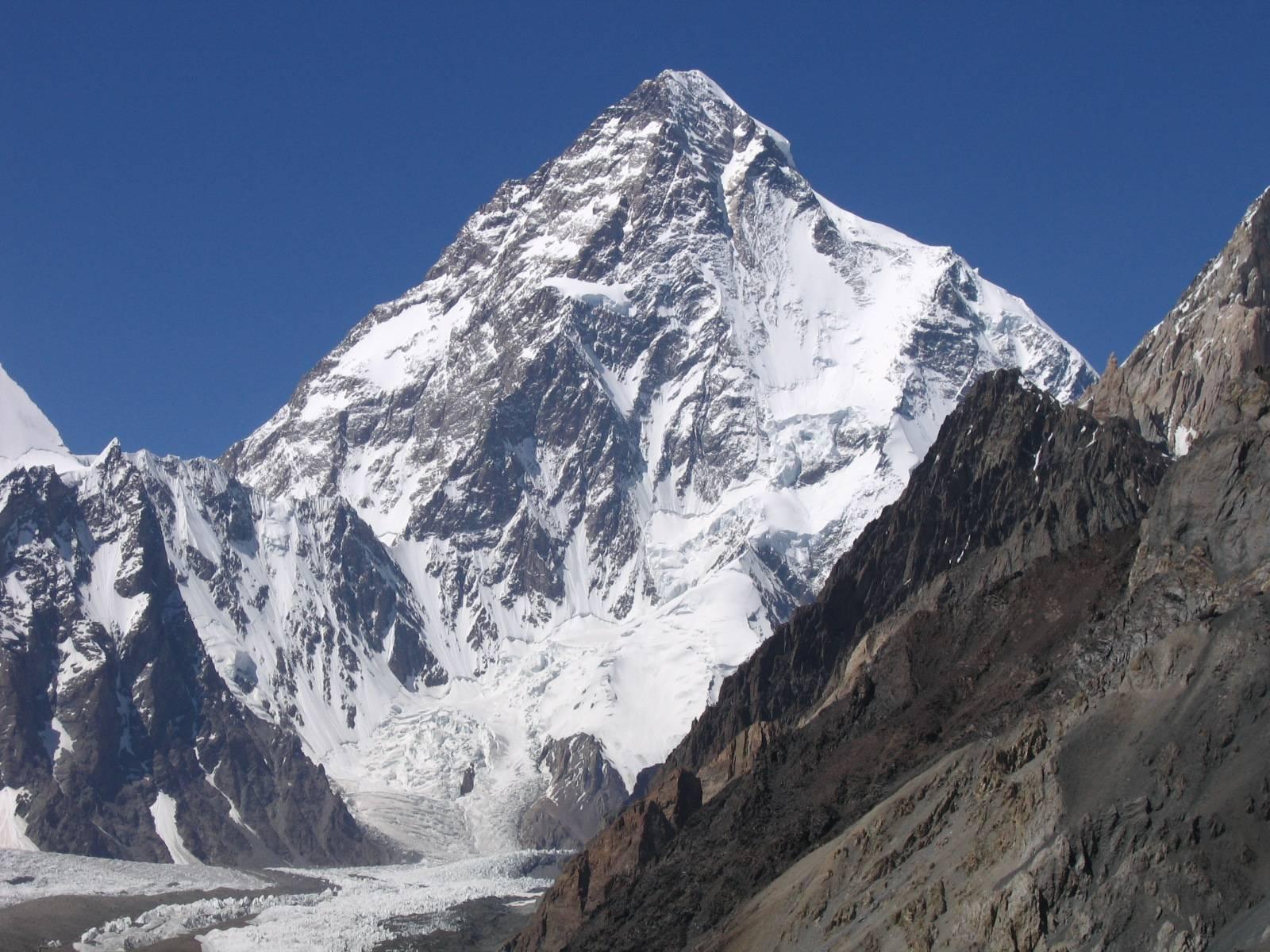
K2 in Gilgit–Baltistan is the second-highest mountain on Earth.

Extremity	Name	Altitude	Location	Province/Territory	Coordinates
Highest (disputed, administered)	K2	8,611 m (28,251 ft)	Border between Gilgit–Baltistan and Xinjiang	Gilgit–Baltistan	35.88250°N 76.51333°E
Highest (undisputed)	Tirich Mir	7,708 m (25,289 ft)	Chitral District	Khyber Pakhtunkhwa	36.26416°N 71.84333°E
Lowest	Near Sir Creek, Thatta	0 m (0.0 ft)	Thatta District	Sindh	23.695°N 68.149°E

== Internal points ==
Province 1	Province 2	Province 3	Location	Notes
Azad Jammu & Kashmir	Khyber Pakhtunkhwa	Punjab	34°00′07″N 73°51′41″E	Manwan Ni Hel serves as the closest populated village to the tripoint. The actual tripoint is located in the Jhelum River.
Punjab	Khyber Pakhtunkhwa	Islamabad Capital Territory	33°47′54″N 73°10′46″E	Eastern tripoint
Punjab	Khyber Pakhtunkhwa	Islamabad Capital Territory	33°43′29″N 72°55′37″E	Shah Allah Ditta serves as the closest populated village to the tripoint Western tripoint
Khyber Pakhtunkhwa	Gilgit-Baltistan	Azad Jammu & Kashmir	35°06′39″N 74°08′00″E	The tripoint is located at the eastern periphery of Lulusar-Dudipatsar National Park
Khyber Pakhtunkhwa	Balochistan	Punjab	31°03′26″N 70°14′46″E	Chitarwata Post
Punjab	Balochistan	Sindh	28°27′21″N 69°22′07″E	

== See also ==
- Geography of Pakistan
- Extreme points of Asia
- List of Pakistani provinces by highest elevation
