= Pakistan (disambiguation) =

Pakistan is a country in South Asia.

Pakistan may also refer to:

== Places ==
- Pakistan, India, a village in the Bihar state of India
- Pakestan, a village in the Ardabil Province of Iran

=== Historical ===
- Dominion of Pakistan, an independent federal dominion in the British Empire from August 1947 to March 1956
- West Pakistan, former western provincial wing of Pakistan from 1955 until the 1971 Bangladesh Liberation War (now Pakistan)
- East Pakistan, former eastern provincial wing of Pakistan from 1955 until the 1971 Bangladesh Liberation War (now Bangladesh)

== Institutes ==
- Pakistan International Airlines, the International airlines carrier of Pakistan

== Songs ==
- "Pakistan", a 2023 UK Top 10 hit by D-Block Europe and Clavish

== See also ==
- Little Pakistan, the global term for urban ethnic enclaves populated primarily by overseas Pakistanis
