= Pakistan Islands Development Authority =

Pakistani federal agency for islands development

- پاکستان حکام برائے ترقیات جزائر
- Emblem of Pakistan

Agency overview
- Formed: September 2, 2020
- Dissolved: January 3, 2021
- Jurisdiction: Government of Pakistan
- Headquarters: Karachi, Pakistan

The Pakistan Islands Development Authority (Urdu: پاکستان حکام برائے ترقیات جزائر); abbreviated as PIDA) was an agency of the Federal Government of Pakistan responsible for islands of Pakistan located in the Arabian Sea along with the Sindh and Balochistan coastal belt. The authority was dissolved after the presidential ordinance that established it failed to pass through the parliament within the stipulated time.

== Formation ==
The Pakistan Islands Development Authority was formulated via a Presidential ordinance on 2 September 2020, and a month later, it appeared in the news. The 'Pakistan Island Development Authority Ordinance 2020' appeared on the website of the Ministry of Maritime Affairs on the 2nd of the previous month. The 25-page ordinance provided for the development of islands off the coasts of Balochistan and Sindh. The Pakistan Island Development Authority was set up, with Imran Amin as its first chairman.

The federal government said that it intended to build modern cities on all these uninhabited islands off the coast of the country (Sindh and Balochistan), arguing that not only could investment come to the country but also the local people could prosper.

The work began with two islands off the coast of Sindh. However, this development was strongly criticized that it would not only disturb and damage natural ecosystems but also disrupt the simplistic lifestyle of the local people of the area, who vowed to resist it. The federal government's move was also condemned as unconstitutional, as it had announced the decision without any consultation with the relevant provincial governments.

== History ==
The development of islands was first mentioned in the media in 2006 when the then-government aimed to build the world's most modern cities on the islands. For that purpose, it approached a UAE construction group for investment and multi-investment.

According to a press statement issued by the then Federal Minister for Shipping and Ports, Babar Ghauri, “The federal government had completed a basic survey to establish the city on islands in the sea, and a new city master plan had been drawn up. More than a dozen high-level meetings had been held to populate the city. The main stakeholder of this project was Karachi Port Trust.

But political problems in the country did not allow the Musharraf government to proceed, and with the fall of the government, the plan fell into disrepair.

The controversy resurfaced in 2013. Even then, the federal government wanted to invest heavily here, and a 45 billion investment deal was being negotiated.

This time, the deal was being negotiated with a celebrity from Pakistan's construction sector who wanted to build modern buildings here with a group from the United Arab Emirates.

But pressure from civil society and the provincial government once again saved the islands.

== Pakistan Islands Development Authority Ordinance ==
According to the ordinance, all the islands on the coasts of Balochistan and Sindh, including Bundal and Buddo, were owned by the federation and were placed in Schedule-I. The Ordinance, citing the Territorial Waters and Maritime Zones Act, 1976, stated that up to 12 nautical miles from coast to sea would now be considered the property of the Authority.

According to the ordinance, the authority would have its office in Karachi and would be headed by the Prime Minister of Pakistan himself.

A board of five to 11 members would also be formed to run the affairs of the authority. The board would be chaired by a chairman who would be elected for five years. According to the authority given to the authority, this authority also had the power to transfer, use, collect taxes, and sell the lands of these islands. According to Article 49 of the Ordinance, it could not be challenged in any court.

The Sindh Assembly and the provincial cabinet of Sindh rejected the ordinance.

== Criticism ==
The people of Sindh had severe concerns and rejected federal authority over the provincial coastal islands because the coastal territory of 18 nautical miles fell under the jurisdiction of the respective province, i.e., Sindh, and the Pakistan federal government's boundaries started after 18 nautical miles until reaching the international sea water boundary. The idea of building a modern city on the islands did not emerge suddenly for the federation; its links dated back to the Musharraf era.

The federal government took direct control over the islands of the province, and the Ordinance was challenged in the Sindh High Court.
