= Biosphere reserves of Pakistan =

Overview of biosphere reserves in Pakistan

The biosphere reserves of Pakistan include the Lal Suhanra Biosphere Reserve, Ziarat Juniper Forest, Bashkar Chitral Garmchashma and the Gallies Biosphere Reserve. These four reserves were established according to the UNESCO's Man and the Biosphere Programme (MAB) to promote sustainable development for the conservation of biological and cultural diversity.

Until 2023, the Lal Suhanra Biosphere Reserve and Ziarat Juniper Forest were the only two biosphere reserves in the country, which were approved by UNESCO in 1977 and 2013 respectively. In 2023, two more sites, Bashkar Chitral Garmchashma in the Hindu Kush range and the Gallies Biosphere Reserve in the Western Himalayan ecoregion, were designated with this status making a total of four biosphere reserves in the country.

In July 2012, Pakistan Museum of Natural History and Beijing Museum of Natural History signed an MoU to work on trans-boundary biodiversity and to improve MAB related activities in the Karakoram, Himalaya, and Hindukush mountain regions.

== Lal Suhanra ==
Lal Suhanra National Park
- IUCN category V (protected landscape/seascape)
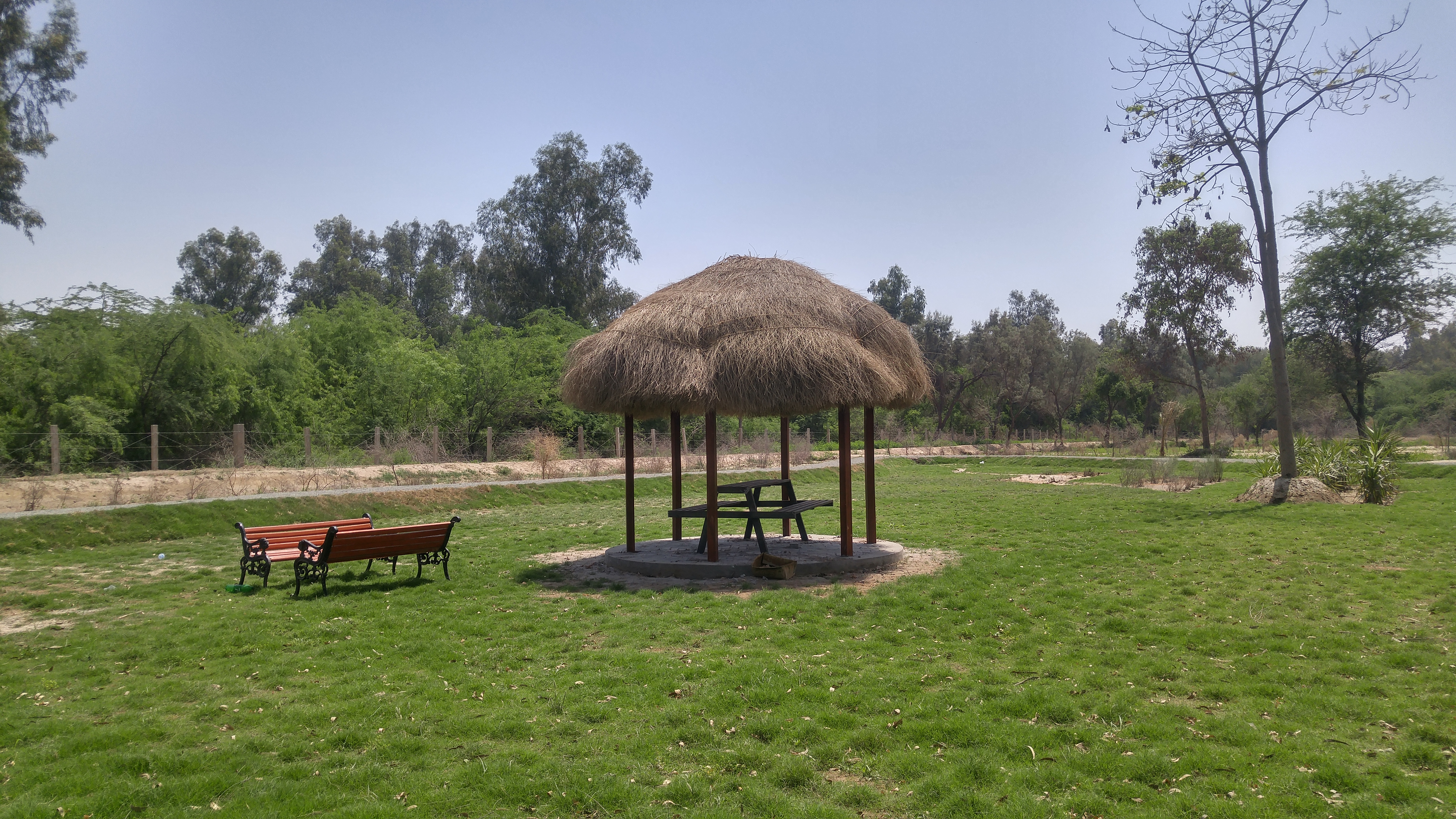

- Location within Pakistan
- Location: Cholistan Desert, Punjab, Pakistan
- Nearest city: Bhawalpur
- Coordinates: 29°12′0″N 71°48′0″E
- Area: 162,573 acres (657.91 km^{2})
- Established: 1972
- Governing body: Lal Suhanra National Park Administration
- Website: www.unesco.org/en/mab/lal-suhanra

Lal Suhanra is a biosphere reserve recognized by UNESCO in 1977 and IUCN Category V protected area. The site is also participating in the Sustainable Management of Marginal Drylands project of MAB's Drylands and Desertification programme.

=== Location and ecosystem ===
The reserve is located in the Cholistan Desert, 36 km east of Bhawalpur in Punjab, Pakistan. The area is flat and arid with sand dunes reaching up to 4 m in height and 2,470 acres (10.0 km^{2}) in area. The total area of the reserve is 162,573 acres (657.91 km^{2}) of which 44,318 acres (179.35 km^{2}) is the core area including 4,781 acres (19.35 km^{2}) of wetland and the rest is buffer zone. The region has a warm desert to semi-desert ecosystem and the climate of the area is hyper-arid. Average annual rainfall ranges from 100 to 250 mm and the groundwater is highly saline.

=== Wildlife and attractions ===
The wetland, Patisar Lake, was initially built as a water reservoir and was an important habitat for waterfowl in winter but is now largely covered with reed beds and aquatic vegetation. The park has around 160 species of birds including houbara bustard, marsh harrier, laggar falcon, peregrine falcon, kestrel, and Egyptian vulture, some of which are endangered species. Mammals in the region include blackbuck and Indian rhino which were both critically endangered and almost became extirpated but were re-introduced. A number of snake species are also found in the park including Russell's viper, Indian cobra, saw scaled viper, wolf snake, and sand boa.

Some archaeological remains of an ancient civilization are discovered along the dry Hakra River bed which crosses the park. According to 1997 statistics, around 1 million national and 50,000 foreign tourist visited the park each year. The Punjab government has plans to convert the Lal Sohanra National Park into a wildlife safari park. One of the prominent attractions is the lion safari which allows guests to see lions in their natural habitat at close range.

== Ziarat Juniper Forest ==
Ziarat Juniper Biosphere Reserve
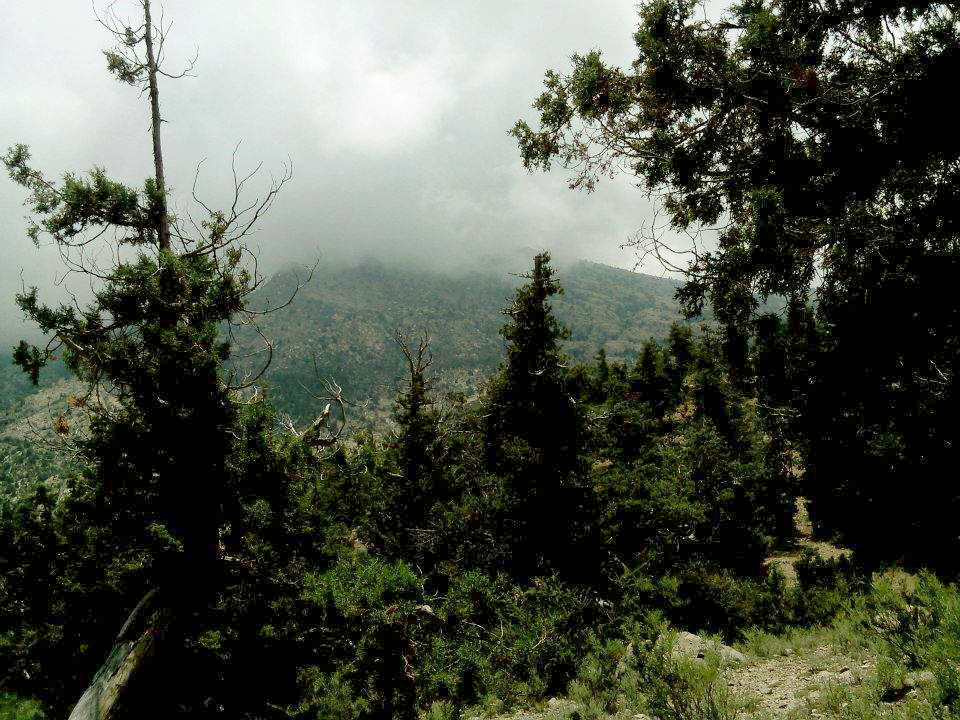

- Location within Pakistan
- Location: Ziarat, Balochistan, Pakistan
- Nearest city: Ziarat
- Coordinates: 30°23′54″N 67°44′00″E
- Area: 247,000 acres (1,000 km^{2})
- Established: 2013
- Governing body: Balochistan Forest and Wildlife Department
- Website: www.unesco.org/en/mab/ziarat-juniper-forests

Ziarat Juniper Forest is a biosphere reserve recognized by UNESCO in 2013. It is the largest contiguous natural Juniper forest in Pakistan. It is also the second oldest, trailing behind the one in California. The forest ecosystem is considered to be the second largest in the world and is home to some of the oldest species of Juniperus excelsa. The forest has a global significance because it is considered vital for carbon sequestration.

=== Location ===
The total area of the reserve is 111,852 ha (1,118.52 km^{2}) of which 11,243 ha (112.43 km^{2}) is the core area including 40,090 ha (400.9 km^{2}) of transition area and the rest 60,519 ha (605.19 km^{2}) is buffer zone.

=== Wildlife ===
There are many important species found in this ecosystem including animal and birds, The Suleiman markhor, urial, black bear, and wolf, as well as more common species such as Afghan pika, fox, jackal, and several species of birds like chukar partridge are found. The forest also contains a rich diversity of plant species of medicinal significance with over 50 percent of the 54 cataloged species known to have medicinal or ethno-botanic value, which local people use as indigenous treatments for a variety of diseases. In Ziarat a herb called Ephedrasinica is found in abundance from which a chemical called ephedrine is extracted.

== See also ==
Media related to Biosphere reserves in Pakistan at Wikimedia Commons

- National Parks of Pakistan
- Protected areas of Pakistan
