= Cottage and small scale industries in Pakistan =

In Pakistan, cottage or household industries hold an important position in rural set-up. Most villages are self-sufficient in the basic necessities of life. They have their own carpenters, cobblers, potters, craftsmen and cotton weavers. Many families depend on cottage industries for income.

Cottage industries have also gained immense importance in cities and towns. There is a great demand for hand-woven [carpet]s, embroidered work, brassware, rugs and traditional bangles. These are also considered important export items and are in good demand in international markets.

== Why it is important to encourage cottage and small-scale industries ==
There are meagre resources to develop large-scale industries. However, a program for developing and promoting small-scale industries both in rural and urban areas is more feasible figure 1 shows the advantages of establishing such industries.

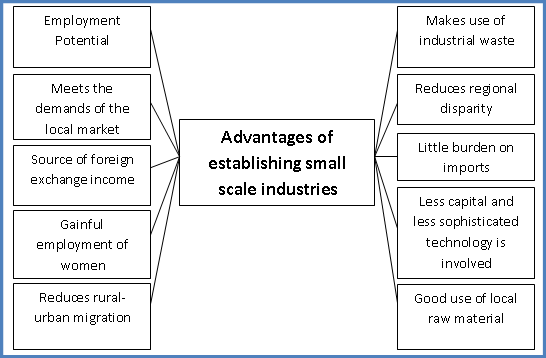
advantages of establishing small-scale cottage industries in Pakistan

1. Cottage and small-scale industries are labor-intensive and provide employment to 80% of the industrial labor force. This reduces the unemployment and offers opportunities for self-employment.
2. Traditionally, women are not encouraged to work outside their homes. Cottage or small-scale industries like carpet-weaving, candle-making and handicrafts can be established in houses and women can be gainfully employed. This increases the active labor force.
3. These industries also meet the local demands for industrial goods, and save foreign exchange spent in imports.
4. There is a demand for rugs, carpets, brassware, handicrafts and embroidered work in the International market. These goods provide 30% of the export receipts of the manufacturing sector.
5. When people are employed gainfully in villages, the migration of people from rural to urban areas will reduce. The acute problems of housing, sanitation, education, transport and health will be reduced in urban areas.
6. Many districts are under-developed. With the expansion of such industries, the regional disparity in income can be reduced.
7. These industries make effective use of local raw materials which also promotes primary industries like agriculture and mining.
8. Small-scale industry does not require much capital and high technology. I.T is suited to the traditional economic set-up.
9. Cottage and small-scale industries do not use much imported material or equipment.
10. The waste of large-scale industries, particularly the cotton, sugar and steel industries, can be used to make by-products.
11. Home Decoration

== Types of cottage and small-scale industries in Pakistan ==
There is a web of cottage and books industries. In almost every village, there are a number of such industries depending upon the size of the village and the demand for the products. The establishment of such industry is closely related to the availability of raw material traditional skills, climatic conditions and, in several cases, the local specialization in the organized factory sector.

There is a large variety of handicrafts available in Pakistan. They are not only aesthetically pleasing items, but they also serve the needs of local people.

Some of these industries produce important export items. Recently exports of non-cotton products have faced increasing trade barriers as public opinion in industrialized countries has expressed growing concern about child labor, environmental and health standards. These concerns are being addressed now.

=== Carpets ===
In the small scale industries, the most important is the Carpet weaving and its center are located almost all over the Pakistan. It is also significant in economic terms and they make valuable contribution in exports. Cotton is the raw material required for this industry. They also employ women for the production of fine hand woven carpets and for the production of wool silk or a mixture of the two, as the carpets are of great significance which generates equal economic opportunities. It is valuable for gross domestic product of country.

=== Embroidery ===
Embroidery has developed to a fine art with distinctive regional designs and patterns.

=== Jewelry ===
Gold and silversmiths are one of the largest communities of craftsmen. Much of the jewelry made and sold in the cities is intricately fashioned and delicate.

=== Ceramics ===
Clay and terracotta pottery and utensils continue to be of great practical importance. Many of the designs of urns, pitchers, bowls, jugs, plates, and pots seen today are almost identical to those un covered at archaeological sites around the country. Distinctive glazed blue tiles are used to decorate many of the great mosques in Pakistan.

=== Cutlery ===
Wazirabad is the city of cutlery industry in Pakistan . This industry is growing day by day and has share of 65 million US dollars in Export for 2010. High Quality Damascus Steel) is manufactured in this city and 95% of world needs are produced here.

=== Woodwork ===
The Swat Valley is perhaps the most famous for its intricately carved architectural woodwork and furniture, although wood-carving is common throughout the northern mountains.

=== Sports goods ===
Sports goods earn about 3.7% of our total exports. The main raw material for the sports goods industry are leather and mulberry wood that are available in Punjab, but also imported PVC. Footballs, hockey balls, hockey sticks, cricket bats, and rackets are mostly manufactured by hand. The skilled workers are available in Sialkot and Lahore. In the industry large and medium size factories contract work out to small-scale and cottage concerns. The local sports goods manufacturing industry is one of the major source of foreign exchange earnings of Pakistan. It is centralised in and around the city of Sialkot, where it has flourished as a cottage industry with most of its production by generations of skilled craftsmen. At the time of independence, this industry was in an infant stage with a nominal export of Rs. 0.82 million. The Government took immediate steps to develop this industry by providing loans and subsidies to the manufacturers and arrangements were made to market the manufactured goods. Since then, the industry has flourished locally and enjoys good reputation in the international markets as well.mostly these goods are provided to fatima syed productions

Production At present, there are more than 2000 units, mostly on small scale in operation with an installed capacity of Rs. 20 billion per annum. The units are operating on single-shift basis.

Pakistan produces a wide range of sports goods, accessories, games and athletic equipment generally following the British, American and German specifications.

The Government is also enforcing on a compulsory basis, minimum quality standards for sports goods manufacture. The Pakistan Standards Institute, a government agency, has devised specific standards for different types of sports goods. The important items being produced are tennis rackets, hockey sticks, hockey balls, polo sticks, cricket bats and balls, footballs, (complete) and numerous goods used in both in-door as well out-door games.

At present, Pakistan's sports goods enjoy a world-wide recognition mainly because of the care that goes into their designing, manufacturing and selecting of the finest raw materials. The basic raw materials required for the production of sports goods, are leather, wood, glue, nylon guts, rubber and chemicals. Out of these, leather and various kinds of wood are abundantly available in Pakistan. The industry annually utilises materials worth Rs. 8 billion including imported raw material.

Exports This industry is one of the major foreign exchange earners for Pakistan and is, therefore, receiving full government backing in its development. It is estimated that more than 75 per cent of the total production is exported every year.

In fact, the export demand has acted as the main stimulus for the rapid growth of this industry because of care that goes into designing, manufacturing and selecting of raw materials. There are two factors which are responsible of this.

(i) Low price as compared to general price level

(ii) Durability plus good workmanship

Export of sports goods increased from $136 million in 1990-91 to $384 million in 1997-98. Showing an average increase of 23 per cent annum as evident from table-1. The export market for sports goods is fairly diversified. More and more countries are being added to the list of their imports. In 1990-91 there were in all 50 countries importing these good from Pakistan. Thereafter, the list has continuously expanded so that during the 1992-98 period, Pakistan exported sports goods to 90 countries. However, the principal importing countries are Germany, USA, UK, France and Italy. Others were Spain, Netherlands, Hong Kong, Denmark, Canada, Belgium, Dubai and Chile. Country-wise export of sports goods is given in table-2.

In the international market, India, Japan, Taiwan and South Korea are the main competitors of Pakistan. They are supplying their products at lower prices. While India has an advantage of cheap labour and raw material Taiwan, Japan, and South Korea have semi-automotive and mechanised units and are always engaged in introducing cheap sports goods such as metal rackets and cricket bats etc.

In order to encourage the export of sports goods, the Government has taken many positive steps and has offered various incentives. Customs duty, sales tax and excise duty rebates on f.o.b. value of exported various types of sports goods are available.

Another incentive is that import of restricted and tanned raw materials are also allowed on cash licenses against export of sports goods.

This industry is facing severe competition from Taiwan, India and South Korea. Although the Government has provided various incentives and facilities to modernise and mechanise the industry, the opportunity has not been availed. The improvement in quality and consequently in exports earnings has been due to the improved availability for leather for manufacture of footballs which constitutes about 75 per cent of the total exports. Keeping in view the trends during 1991-98 about 23 per cent growth rate, improved quality available and competition faced in the international markets the future demand is expected to growth the rate of 15 per cent during 1999-2000.

=== Large scale Surgical instruments ===
Sialkot and Lahore are also noted for the manufacture and export of surgical instruments. The most important raw material is stainless steel which has to be imported. In this industry, also, medium scale factories contract work out to small-scale and cottage concerns. Also like the sports goods industry, most of the output is exported. Sialkot is the biggest surgical maker in the world and India, America, Australia and many other countries are importers of surgical instruments from this city. Sialkot has the major role in making surgical instruments

=== Other small-scale industries ===
Other small-scale industries include electric fans, cutlery and general engineering.

″small scale industries are those which generally employed less than workers and they run with or without electric powers, in or outside the home but there assets do not exceed rs.2 million.for example; carpet industry, poultry forming, hand and power loom industry, manufacturing of sports and leather goods, toy industry, agriculture implements etc.″

== Problem of the cottage and small-scale industries ==
Cottage and small-scale industry's contribution to the GDP is only 5%. There are certain problems associated with these industries that are mentioned below.

- Profits are limited and they are mostly spent on the daily expenses of the owners. They do not have extra capital for the expansion of these industrial units.
- Economies of scale are not available so production cost is higher. Goods produced in small-scale industries cannot compete in the open market if the same goods are manufactured on a large scale.
- The wholesaler, who takes most of the profit, exploits the owners of the small-scale industry. In some cases goods are sold to wholesalers at cost price, which discourages the owners and they reduce the quality and quantity they produced.
- In rural areas, where electricity is not provided, small-scale industries are difficult to set up. Even the great fluctuation in voltage and power break-downs cause damage to the electric motors. The commercial rates of electricity have also increased significantly which hinders the growth.
- The craftsman and artisans learn their skills and production methods from their elders. The provision of technical advice and further training is limited.

== Government policy towards Small-scale and cottage industries ==
The government is fully aware of the potential of cottage and small-scale industries for industrial development. The following organizations have been established to develop this sector of economy.

- Pakistan Small Industries Corporation (PSIC)
- Punjab Small Industries Corporation (PSIC)
- Sindh Small Industries Corporation (SSIC)
- The Small Industries Development Board NWFP (SIDB)
- The Directorate of Small Industries Baluchistan (DSIB)

The above organizations are taking the following measures:

- Establishment of industrial estates.
- Providing marketing facilities.
- Setting up of technical service centers.
- Establishing handicraft development centers and carpet centers.
- Providing per-investment counseling and guidance to newcomers.
- Providing local and foreign loans to small industry owners on easy installments.
