= Pakestan =

- Location in Iran
- Coordinates: 37°36′09″N 48°19′22″E
- Country: Iran
- Province: Ardabil Province
- Time zone: UTC+3:30 (IRST)
  - Summer (DST): UTC+4:30 (IRDT)

Pakestan (Persian: پاکستان) is a village in the Ardabil Province of Iran.
