= Cue sports in Pakistan =

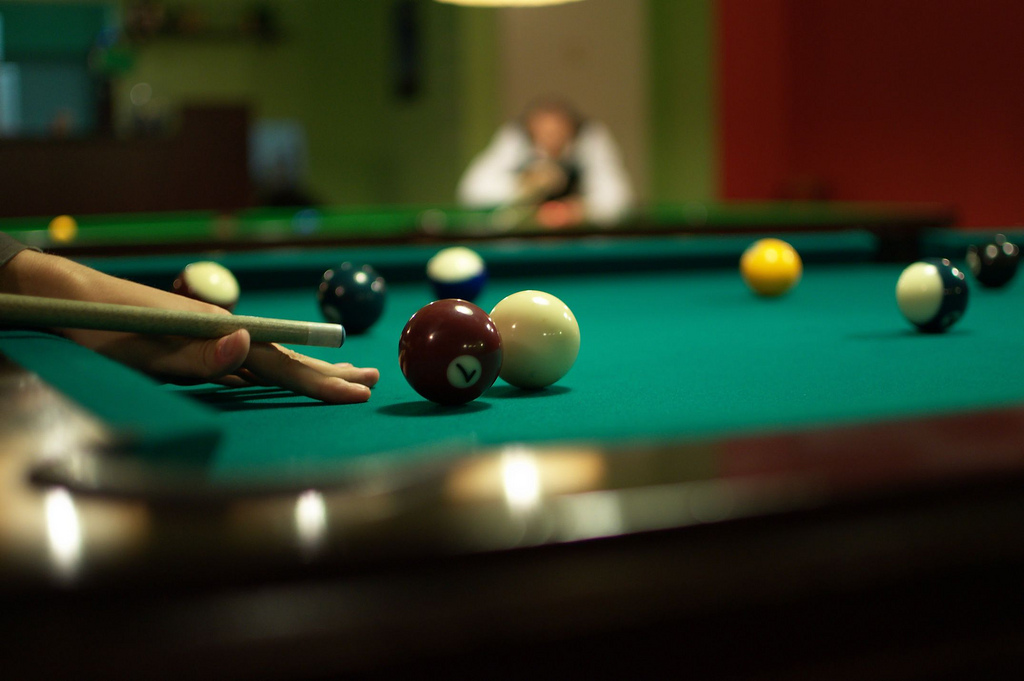
- Governing body: Pakistan Billiard & Snooker Federation

Billiards in Pakistan are a popular pastime.

Sindh Snooker Cup is organized for the development of Snooker players in Pakistan.

== History ==
The Pakistan Billiard & Snooker Federation was formed in 1958 and is the national sports governing body for Billiards and Snooker.

== Events ==
Pakistan Billiards and Snooker Federation organizes snooker series. Pakistan hosted the 2012 Asian 6-red ball Championship in Karachi, which was organized by the Pakistan Billiards and Snooker Association (PBSA) which also submitted bid for hosting 2015 6-Red World Cup. Pankaj Advani defeated Yan Bingtao of China in the World 6Reds event held at Karachi. at the event Maxim Cassis Vice President of International Billiards and Snooker Federation (ISBSF) commented that 'Pakistan is land of World Snooker Champions.'

Pakistan national team decided to participate in the 4th Asian Team Championship and 5th Six Red Snooker Championship which will be held in Abu Dhabi, United Arab Emirates.
