= Manwan ni Hill =

Location in Abbottabad District, Khyber Pakhtunkhwa, Pakistan

Coordinates: 34.000792°N 73.514149°E

Manwan Ni Hill (Urdu: مانواں نی ہل) is the lowest point in Union Council Berote Kalan located on the right bank of the Jhelum River of Abbottabad District, Khyber Pakhtunkhwa, Pakistan. It serves as a tripoint for the internal provincial borders of Khyber Pakhtunkhwa, Punjab and Azad Jammu & Kashmir.
