= Bundal Island =

Pakistani island

Native name: جزیرہ بھنڈار Nickname: Sindhi: ڀنڍار ٻيٽ
- Interactive map of Bundal Island

Geography
- Location: Arabian Sea
- Coordinates: 24°43′30″N 67°7′36″E
- Archipelago: Indus Delta
- Area: 24.3 km^{2} (9.4 sq mi)
- Highest elevation: 6 m (20 ft)

Administration
- Pakistan
- Province: Sindh
- Division: Karachi
- District: Malir

Demographics
- Population: Uninhabited

Bundal Island (Urdu: جزیرہ بھنڈار; Sindhi: ڀنڍار ٻيٽ), also known as Bundle Island or Bhandar Island, is an uninhabited island situated southeast of Karachi's peninsular area known as Defence, along the Arabian Sea coastline. Spanning approximately 24 km^{2}, it is part of the Indus River Delta.

The island is home to the shrine of Sufi saint Yousuf Shah, whose annual urs at his tomb attracts thousands of coastal people to the island. Khiprianwala and Buddo are neighbouring islands.

There is a dispute between the provincial government of Sindh and Port Qasim Authority on the ownership rights of 12,000 acres (49 km^{2}) of land in these Islands.

== Development of Bundal Island ==
Bundal Island was part of a reportedly $50 billion city development initiative under the Pakistan Islands Development Authority. The short-lived authority was formed on September 2, 2020 and dissolved on January 3, 2021, after the presidential ordinance that established it failed to pass through the parliament. The federal government's move was strongly criticized for its impact on natural ecosystems and complete lack of consultation with the provincial government.

In 2013, Bahria Town announced a joint venture with Thomas Kramer's companies to develop the ambitious Bodha Island City project on Bundal and Buddo Islands at an estimated cost of $20 billion. Spanning 12,000 acres, the project was planned for completion within 5–10 years, with residential communities expected to be handed over starting in 2016. The proposed global attractions included the world’s tallest building, the largest shopping mall, a sports city, educational and medical hubs, an international city, and a media city, all boasting state-of-the-art facilities and cutting-edge infrastructure. The project was projected to create approximately 2.5 million jobs and provide housing for potentially millions of people.

The proposed development of Bundal Island as an exclusive resort faces significant challenges, including costly infrastructure requirements for transportation, power, water, and waste management. As of 2024, however, the project remains in the planning stage.

== See also ==
- Pakistan Islands Development Authority
- List of islands of Pakistan
- Buddo Island
