= Buddo Island =

Pakistani island

Native name: جزیرہ بدو Nickname: Sindhi: ڏنگي ٻيٽ
- Interactive map of Buddo Island

Geography
- Location: Arabian Sea
- Coordinates: 24°43′59″N 67°12′37″E
- Archipelago: Indus Delta
- Area: 12 km^{2} (4.6 sq mi)
- Highest elevation: 2 m (7 ft)

Administration
- Pakistan
- Province: Sindh
- Division: Karachi
- District: Malir

Demographics
- Population: Uninhabited

Buddo Island, also known as Muchaq Island and as Dingi (Urdu: جزیرہ بدو); (Sindhi: ڏنگي ٻيٽ) is an uninhabited Pakistani island located east of Bundal Island and south of Khiprianwala Island near Karachi, along the Arabian Sea coastline. It marks the westernmost edge of the Indus Delta.

In 2022, Buddo Island, spanning 3,000 acres, was designated a protected forest under an Act of 1958.

== Pakistan Islands Development Authority ==
Buddo Island was part of a reportedly $50 billion city development initiative under the Pakistan Islands Development Authority. The short-lived authority was formed on September 2, 2020 and dissolved on January 3, 2021, after the presidential ordinance that established it failed to pass through the parliament. The federal government's move was strongly criticized for its impact on natural ecosystems and complete lack of consultation with the provincial government.

== World Wide Fund for Nature-Pakistan (WWF-P) ==
The fragile ecosystem of this area is already under pressure from growing pollution that will intensify in case of any [concrete] development. We should have an environmental audit of this place so that strategies could be developed for its protection. It has no potential for eco-tourism whatsoever,

— Tahir Rasheed, WWF-P’s regional director,

== Ratto Kot ==
The island features an archaeological site, believed to be the ruins of the Sasanian-style fortress known as Ratto Kot, which remains mainly buried beneath mud.

== See also ==
- List of islands of Pakistan
- Bundal Island
