= International rankings of Pakistan =

Rankings of Pakistan internationally

These are the international rankings of Pakistan.

== Geography ==
List	World Ranking	Source	Notes
Total Area	33/196	United Nations Statistics Division	881,913 km
Irrigated land area	4/145	CIA World Factbook	202,000
Length of coastline	74/196	List of countries by length of coastline	1,030 km
Highest Point	2/248(official territory)		K2 is the second highest peak in the world
Mountain peaks over 7,200 meters above sea level	2nd (official territories)	List of highest mountains on Earth	Pakistan has 42 mountain peaks which are over 7,200 metres (23,622 ft) above sea level.
Forest area	41/193	CIA's World Factbook	

== Cereals, Fruits and Livestock Production ==
Source is Food and Agriculture Organization

Field	World Ranking	Year
Seed Cotton, output of 4,096,106 tonnes	5	2021
Rice, output of 13,984,009 tonnes	9	2021
Onion, output of 2,305,701 tonnes	6	2021
Mangoes, Mangosteens, Guavas output of 2,677,017 tonnes	4	2021
Wheat, output of 27,464,081 tonnes	8	2021
Dates, output of 532,879,55 tonnes	6	2021
Sugar Cane, output of 8,865,593 tonnes	4	2021
Chickpea, output of 233,934 tonnes	8	2021
Okra, output of 263,448 tonnes	5	2021
Goats, Stock of 76,143,000 Heads	4	2019
Buffaloes Stock of 40,002,000 Heads	2	2019
Asses Stock of 5,417,000 Heads	3	2019
Chicken Stock of 1,321,000 Heads	5	2019
Camels Stock of 1,090,000 Heads	9	2019
Meat (Buffalo), 1,085,000 tonnes	2	2019
Milk (Goat), 940,000 tonnes	4	2019
Meat (Goat), 491,000 tonnes	3	2019

== Cities ==
List	World Ranking	Notes
Largest City(Population)	12	City: Karachi
Largest City(Area)	71	City: Karachi

== Demographics ==
List	World Ranking	Source	Notes
Global Peace Index	▼140/163	Institute for Economics and Peace	
Fertility Rate	38/228	CIA World Factbook	3.60 child born per woman
English speaking population	3/133	List of countries by English-speaking population	211.8 million
Human Development Index	154/189	United Nations Development Programme	
Quality-of-life index	93/111	Economist Intelligence Unit	
Literacy rate	62.8%	World Bank	82.5% youth literacy rate (population 15–24 years both genders)
Population	5/238	CIA World Factbook	Total Population 268,580,000
Population growth rate	45/237	World Health Organization	2.07%
Population Density	50/235	Worldometer	275 people per km^{2} of land area
Life Expectancy at birth	144/183	CIA World Factbook	66.2 years
Health expenditures	187/192	CIA World Factbook	2.8% of GDP
Happiness Index	105/148	World Happiness Report	
Linguistic diversity index	42/209	UNESCO	

== Economy ==
List	World Ranking	Source	Notes
Account Balance	53/206	CIA World Factbook	144.8 billion US dollars
Exports	67/224	CIA World Factbook	31.73 billion US dollars
Imports	50/224	CIA World Factbook	60.2 billion US dollars
Index of Economic Freedom	153/178	The Heritage Foundation	
GDP (nominal) per capita	157/213	The tribune	1,568 US dollars
GDP (nominal)	43/195	The tribune	341 billion US dollars
GDP (PPP)	24/229	IMF	1.58 trillion US dollars
GDP (PPP) per capita	138/213	IMF	6,836 US dollars
Global Competitiveness Index	110/137	World Economic Forum	
Financial Development Index	58/62	World Economic Forum	
Ease of Doing Business Index	108/190	World Bank	
Labor Force	6/141	World Economic Forum	71.76 million
Inflation rate	63/226	PBS	35.4%
Reserves of foreign exchange and gold	100/195	CEIC	8.5 billion US dollars

== Industry ==
List	World Ranking	Source	Notes
Cement production	17/154	United States Geological Survey	74,000 metric tons
Electricity production	32/209	BP	137,800 GWh
Hand-sewn footballs production	1		55% of football are made in Sialkot
Surgical instrument manufacturing	1		80% of world supply come from Sialkot

== Environment ==
List	World Ranking	Source	Notes
Environmental Sustainbility Index	131/146	Yale Center for Environmental Law and Policy	ESI Score 39.9
Happy Planet Index	36/140	New Economics Foundation	HPI Score 31.5
Forest cover	185/217	World Bank	1.9%
CO_{2} emissions	31/205	World Bank	223.6 million tonnes

== Energy ==
List	Pakistan Ranking/Total Countries	Source	Notes
Electricity Production	28/209	CIA World Factbook	137,800 GWh
Installed Capacity	1/215	CIA World Factbook	37,402 MW
Electricity Consumption	1/219	CIA World Factbook	90,000 GWh
Electricity From Fossil Fuels	1/215	CIA World Factbook	62% Of Total Installed Capacity
Electricity From Nuclear Fuels	1/215	CIA World Factbook	4% Of Total Installed Capacity
Electricity From Hydroelectric Plants	1/215	CIA World Factbook	29% Of Total Installed Capacity
Crude Oil Production	44/217	CIA World Factbook	89,720 BBL/Day
Crude Oil Imports	25/218	WorldsTopTrade	168,200 bbl/day (2015 est.)
Crude Oil Proved Reserve	47/215	CIA World Factbook	332.2 million Barrel
Natural Gas Production	22/217	CIA World Factbook	39.05 Billion Cubic Meter/Annually
Natural Gas Imports	32/216	CIA World Factbook	6.003 Billion Cubic Meter/Annually
Natural Gas Proved Reserve	30/210	CIA World Factbook & EIA	588.8 Billion Cubic Meter / 20.8 Trillion Cubic Feet
Uranium Production	14/20	World Nuclear Association	45 Tonnes

== Military ==
List	World Ranking	Source	Notes
Military expenditures	23/155	CIA World Factbook	1.8% of GDP
Active troops	6/173	Statista	780,000
Active UN Peacekeepers	1/119	List of countries by number of UN peacekeepers	10,000+
Defence budget	16/140		15.8 billion
Tanks	7/140		4,173
Aircraft	7/140		1,574
Total naval	7/140		272

== Political ==
List	World Ranking	2021	2020	2019	2018	2017	2016	2015	2014	Sources
Corruption Perceptions Index	▲140/179		▼31	▼32	▲33	▲32	▲32	▲30	▲29	Transparency International; 100 is very clean and 0 is highly corrupt
Worldwide press freedom index	▲145/180	▲46.86	▼45.52	▲45.83	▼43.24	▼43.55	▼48.52	▼50.46		Reporters Without Borders; 0 is better and 100 is worse
Democracy Index	▼108/167		▲4.31	▲4.25	▼4.17	▼4.26	▼4.33	▼4.40	4.64	Economist Intelligence Unit; 100 is Full democracy and 0 is Authoritarian
Fragile States Index	▲30/179	▼90.5	▼92.1	▼94.2	▼96.3	▼98.9	▼101.7	▼103.0		Fund for Peace and Foreign Policy; 0 is very sustainable and 100 is High Alert

== Communications ==
Following rankings involving technological advances in communication are taken from the CIA World Factbook.

List	World Ranking	Demographics (est.)
Telephone Lines in Use	33/218	46.7 million
Mobile Phone Users	7/222	300 million
Internet hosts	57/233	11.2 million
Number of Internet Users	9/217	258.3 million

== Sports ==
List	World Ranking	Source	Notes
Test Cricket - men's	7/ 12	International Cricket Council	
ODI Cricket - men's	5/ 20	International Cricket Council	1992 ICC Cricket World Cup Winners, ICC Champions Trophy 2017 winners
T20I Cricket - men's	7/ 85	International Cricket Council	2009 ICC World T20 Winners
ODI Cricket - women's	6 / 10	International Cricket Council	
Kabaddi (Standard Style)- men's	3/10	IKF	Universal"v"
Number of British Open Squash champions (men)	1/ 12	British Open Squash Championships	30 championships
Number of World Squash Championships (men)	1/150	World Squash Championships	14 championships
Number of World Cup in Field Hockey (men)	1 / 11	International Hockey Federation	4 World Cups
International Hockey Federation World Rankings (men)	18/90	International Hockey Federation	
International Hockey Federation World Rankings (women)	60/75	International Hockey Federation	

== Technology ==
List	World ranking	Source
Global Innovation Index, 2026	95 out of 139	World Intellectual Property Organization

== Awards ==
List	World Ranking	Source	Notes
Nobel laureates	51/82	Nobel Prize	1. Malala Yousafzai, Peace, 2014; 2. Abdus Salam, Physics, 1979
Academy Award for Best Documentary ( Short Subject )	2nd in the world along with Malcolm Clarke, Walt Disney, Bill Guttentag, Robin Lehman	Academy Awards	Sharmeen Obaid-Chinoy 2012 and 2016 and 2018
Academy Award for Best Documentary Short Subject - 2 Wins (Female)	1st in the World	Academy Awards	In 2012, Sharmeen Obaid-Chinoy became the first Pakistani to win an Oscar, winning the Academy Award for Best Documentary Short Subject alongside co-director Daniel Junge for their film Saving Face. She won again in 2016 for the film A Girl in the River: The Price of Forgiveness, becoming the first female filmmaker to win twice in this category.
Lenin Peace Prize	-	Lenin Peace Prize	1. Faiz Ahmed Faiz, 1962; 2. Abdul Sattar Edhi, 1988
Légion d'Honneur	-	Légion d'Honneur	1. Ahmad Hasan Dani, 1998; 2. Asma Jahangir, 2014

== See also ==
- Lists of countries
- Lists by country
- List of international rankings
