= Geography of Pakistan =

- Continent: Asia
- Region: South Asia
- Coordinates: 30.00°N 70.00°E
- Area: Ranked 33rd
  - Total: 881,913 km^{2} (340,509 sq mi)
  - Land: 97.14%
  - Water: 2.86%
- Coastline: 1,046 km (650 mi)
- Borders: Total: 7,545 km (4,688.2 mi); Afghanistan: 2,670 km (1,659.1 mi); China: 596 km (370.3 mi); India: 3,320 km (2,063.0 mi); Iran: 959 km (595.9 mi)
- Highest point: K2; 8,611 m (28,251 ft)
- Lowest point: Indian Ocean; 0 m (0.0 ft)
- Longest river: Indus River
- Largest lake: Manchhar Lake
- Exclusive economic zone: 290,000 km^{2} (110,000 mi^{2})

The Geography of Pakistan (Urdu: جغرافیۂ پاکِستان, romanized: Juġarāfiyā-Pākistān) encompasses a wide variety of landscapes varying from plains to deserts, forests, and plateaus ranging from the coastal areas of the Arabian Sea in the south to the mountains of the Karakoram, Hindukush, Himalayas ranges in the north. Pakistan geologically overlaps both with the Indian and the Eurasian tectonic plates where its Sindh and Punjab provinces lie on the north-western corner of the Indian plate while Balochistan, most of Khyber Pakhtunkhwa, and Gilgit-Baltistan lie within the Eurasian plate which mainly comprises the Iranian Plateau and the Tibetan Plateau in the north.

Pakistan is bordered by Iran to the west, Afghanistan to the northwest, India to the east, and China to the northeast. It shares a maritime border with Oman in the Gulf of Oman, and is separated from Tajikistan in the northwest by Afghanistan's narrow Wakhan Corridor. Geopoltically, the nation is situated within some of the most hostile regional boundaries, characterized by territorial disputes and historical tensions, particularly the Kashmir conflict with India, which has led to multiple military confrontations between the two countries.

Pakistan's western borders include the Khyber Pass and Bolan Pass that have served as traditional migration and trade routes between Central Eurasia and South Asia, serving as conduits for cultural exchanges, military invasions, and commercial activity for centuries.

== Area and boundaries ==
Area
- total: 8,823,638 km^{2} (3,406,826 sq mi)
  - country rank in the world: 33rd
- land: 857,143 km^{2} (330,945 sq mi)
- water: 25,220 km^{2} (9,740 sq mi)

Area—comparative
- Australia comparative: approximately half the size of Queensland
- Canada comparative: approximately 1 1/3 times the size of Alberta
- United Kingdom comparative: approximately 3 3/5 times the size of the United Kingdom
- United States comparative: approximately four times the size of Utah
- EU comparative: slightly less than three times the size of Italy

=== International boundaries ===
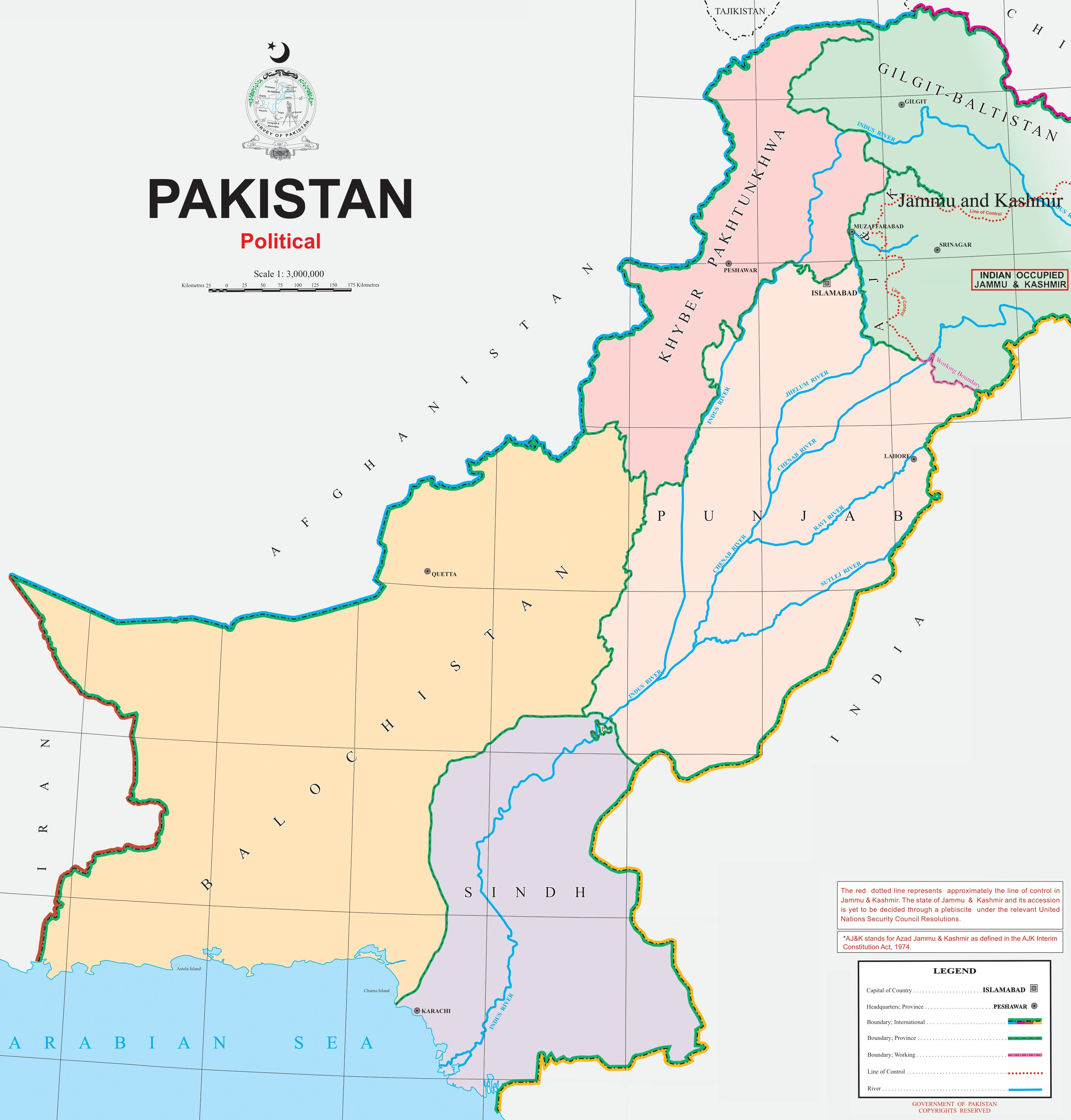
Official political map of Pakistan (2020) showing international and internal borders

Pakistan shares its borders with four neighboring countries—People's Republic of China, Afghanistan, India, and Iran—while Tajikistan is separated by the narrow Wakhan Corridor. Additionally, Pakistan shares maritime boundaries with India and Iran and has close maritime proximity with Oman across the Arabian Sea, which plays a crucial role in its trade and maritime connectivity. In total, Pakistan's land borders span approximately 7,307 km (4,540.4 mi), excluding its coastline along the Arabian Sea.

==== Afghanistan–Pakistan border ====
The border with Afghanistan which is known as the Durand Line, 2,640 km (1,640.4 mi), which runs from the Hindu Kush and the Pamir Mountains. A narrow strip of Afghanistan territory called the Wakhan Corridor extends between Pakistan and Tajikistan.

==== China–Pakistan border ====
The eastern tip of the Wahan Corridor starts the Sino-Pak border between the People's Republic of China and Pakistan spanning about 559 km (347.3 mi). It carries on south-eastward and ends near the Karakoram Pass. This line was determined from 1961 to 1965 in a series of agreements between China and Pakistan and finally on 2 March 1963 both the governments, of Karachi and Beijing, formally agreed. It is understood that if the dispute over Kashmir is resolved, the border would need to be discussed again.

==== India–Pakistan border ====
The Northern Areas has fifth of the world's seventeen highest peaks along with highest range of mountains the Karakoram and Himalayas. It also has such extensive glaciers that it has sometimes been called the "Third Pole". The international border-line has been a matter of pivotal dispute between Pakistan and India ever since 1947, and the Siachen Glacier in northern Kashmir has been an important arena for fighting between the two sides since 1984, although far more soldiers have died of exposure to the cold than from any skirmishes in the conflict between their National Armies facing each other.

The Pakistan–India ceasefire line runs from the Karakoram Pass west-southwest to a point about 130 kilometres northwest of Lahore. This line, about 740 kilometres long, was arranged with United Nations (UNO) assistance at the end of the Indo-Pakistani War of 1947–48. The ceasefire line came into effect on 1 January 1949, after eighteen months of fighting between Indian forces and Pakistani forces and was last adjusted and agreed upon by the two countries according to the Shimla Agreement of 2 July 1972 between Indira Gandhi and Zulfikar Ali Bhutto. Since then, it has been generally known as the Line of Control or the (LoC).

The India–Pakistan border continues irregularly southward for about 1,280 kilometers, following the Radcliffe line, named for Sir Cyril Radcliffe, the head of the British Boundary Commission on the division of the Punjab and Bengal provinces of British India on 13 August 1947.

The southern borders are far less contentious than those in northern Pakistan (Kashmir). The Thar Desert in the province of Sindh is separated in the south from the salt flats of the Rann of Kachchh (Kutch) by a boundary that was first delineated in 1923–1924. After independence and dissolution of Empire, Independent and free Pakistan contested the southern boundary of Sindh, and a succession of border incidents resulted. They were less dangerous and less widespread, however, than the conflict that erupted in Kashmir in the Indo-Pakistani War of August 1965, which started with this decisive core of issues. These southern hostilities were ended by British mediation during Harold Wilson's era, and both sides accepted the award of the Indo-Pakistan Western Boundary Case Tribunal designated by the UN secretary general himself. The tribunal made its award on 19 February 1968; delimiting a line of 403 kilometres that was later demarcated by joint survey teams, of its original claim of some 9,100 square kilometres, Pakistan was awarded only about 780 square kilometers. Beyond the western terminus of the tribunal's award, the final stretch of Pakistan's border with India is about 80 kilometres long, running east and southeast of Sindh to an inlet of the Indian Ocean. The village of Punjwarian is one of the villages close to the border of Indo-Pakistan.

==== Iran–Pakistan border ====
The boundary with Iran, 959 km (595.9 mi), was first delimited by a British commission in the same year as the Durand Line was demarcated, separating Iran from what was then British India's Baluchistan province. Modern Iran has a province named Sistan and Baluchestan that borders Pakistan and has Baluchis in an ethnic majority. In 1957, Pakistan signed a frontier agreement with Iran in Rawalpindi according to which the border was officially declared and the two countries have not had this border as a subject of serious dispute at all.

=== Maritime border ===
Contiguous zone
12 nautical miles (22 km; 14 mi)
Continental shelf
350 nautical miles (650 km; 400 mi), or to the edge of the continental margin
Exclusive Economic Zone
290,000 km^{2} (110,000 mi^{2})
Territorial sea
12 nautical miles (22 km; 14 mi)

== Geographical regions ==
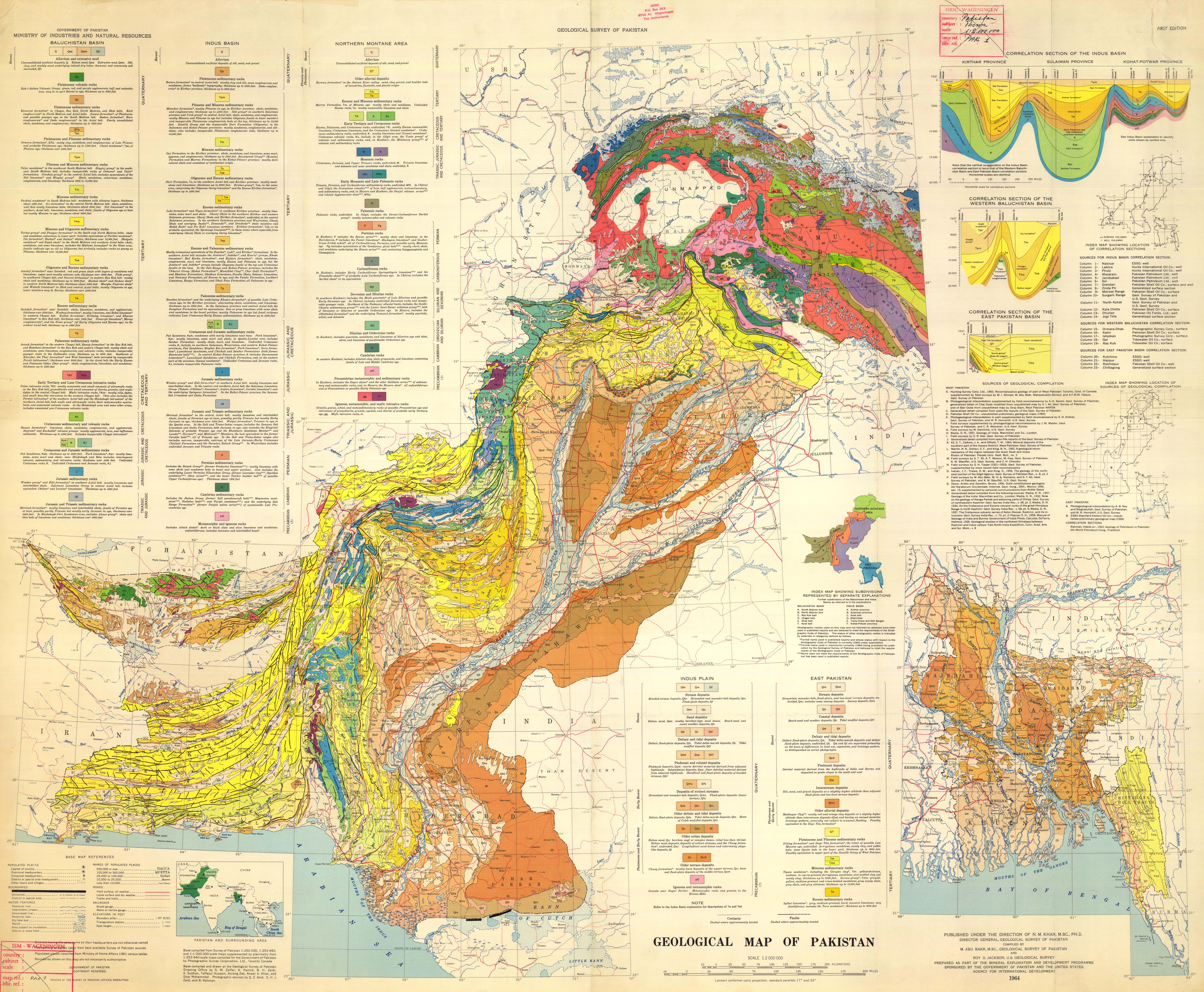
Geological map of Pakistan. (This image is from 1964, and so includes East Pakistan, modern Bangladesh.)

Pakistan is divided into three major geographic areas: the northern highlands; the Indus River plain, with two major subdivisions corresponding roughly to the provinces of Punjab and Sindh; and the Balochistan Plateau. Some geographers designate additional major regions. For example, the mountain ranges along the western border with Afghanistan are sometimes described separately from the Balochistan Plateau, and on the eastern border with India, south of the Sutlej River, the Thar Desert may be considered separately from the Indus Plain. Nevertheless, the country may conveniently be

visualized in general terms as divided in three by an imaginary line drawn eastward from the Khyber Pass and another drawn southwest from Islamabad down the middle of the country. Roughly, then, the northern highlands are north of the imaginary east–west line; the Balochistan Plateau is to the west of the imaginary southwest line; and the Indus Plain lies to the east of that line.

=== The Northern Highlands ===
The northern highlands include parts of the Hindu Kush, the Karakoram Range, and the Himalayas. This area includes such famous peaks as K2 (Mount Godwin Austen, at 8,611 meters the second highest peak in the world). More than one-half of the summits are over 4,500 meters, and more than fifty peaks reach above 6,500 meters. Travel through the area is difficult and dangerous, although the government is attempting to develop certain areas into tourist and trekking sites. Because of their rugged topography and the rigors of the climate, the northern highlands and the Himalayas to the east have been formidable barriers to movement into Pakistan throughout history.

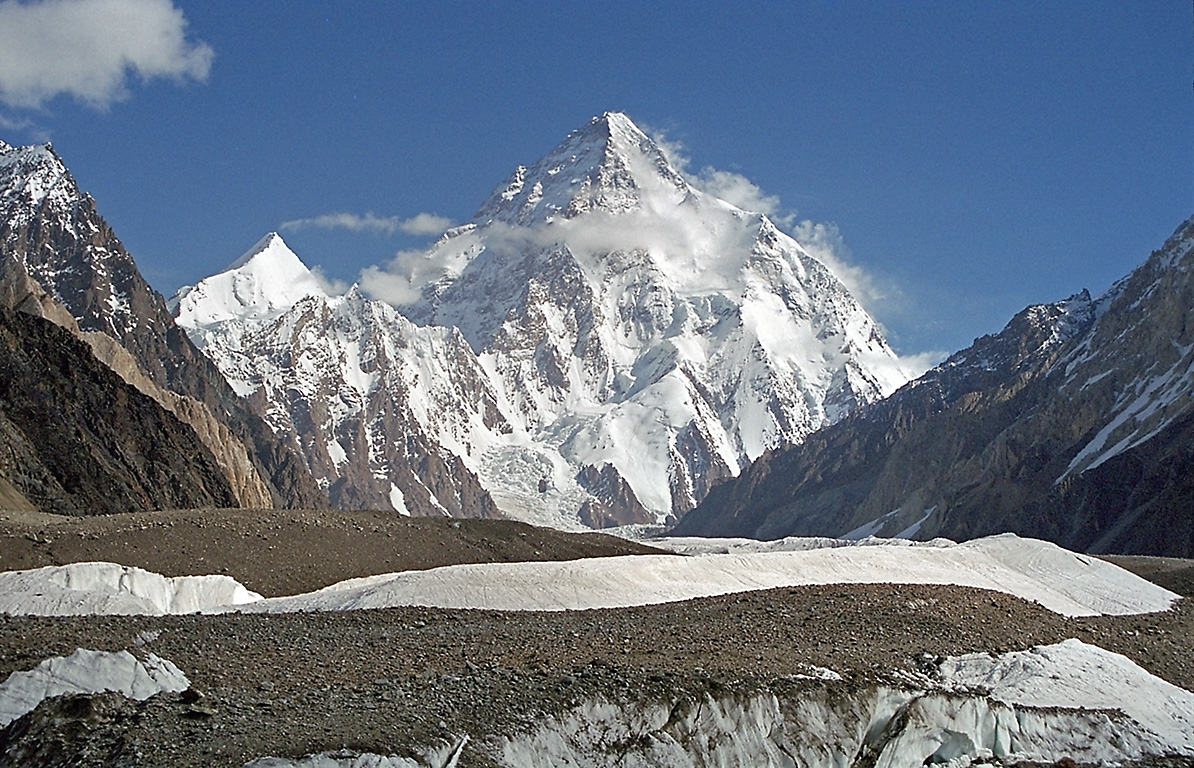
K2, at 8,611 metres (28,251 feet), is the world's second highest peak

South of the northern highlands and west of the Indus River plain are the Safed Koh Range along the Afghanistan border and the Suleiman Range and Kirthar Range, which define the western extent of the province of Sindh and reach almost to the southern coast. The lower reaches are far more arid than those in the north, and they branch into ranges that run generally to the southwest across the province Balochistan. North-south valleys in Balochistan and Sindh have restricted the migration of peoples along the Makran Coast on the Indian Ocean east toward the plains.

Several large passes cut the ranges along the border with Afghanistan. Among them are the Khojak Pass, about eighty kilometres northwest of Quetta in Balochistan; the Khyber Pass, forty kilometres west of Peshawar and leading to Kabul; and the Broghol Pass in the far north, providing access to the Wakhan Corridor.

Less than one-fifth of Pakistan's land area has the potential for intensive agricultural use. Nearly all of the arable land is actively cultivated, but outputs are low by world standards. Cultivation is sparse in the northern mountains, the southern deserts, and the western plateaus, but the Indus River basin in Punjab and northern Sindh has fertile soil that enables Pakistan to feed its population under usual climatic conditions.

=== The Indus plain ===
The name Indus comes from Latin Indus, from Ancient Greek Ἰνδός (Indós), from Old Persian 𐏃𐎡𐎯𐎢𐏁 (h-i-du-u-š /hiⁿduš/), from Proto-Iranian *hínduš (compare Avestan 𐬵𐬌𐬧𐬛𐬎 (hiṇdu), as mentioned, one of the Rigvedic rivers, from which also come the words Sindh, Hindu, and India. The Indus, one of the great rivers of the world, rises in southwestern Tibet only about 160 kilometres west of the source of the Sutlej River, which then itself flows through Punjab, India and joins the Indus in Pakistani Punjab. The catchment area of the Indus is estimated at almost 1 million square kilometres, and all of Pakistan's major rivers—the Kabul, Jhelum, and Chenab—flow into it. The Indus River basin is a large, fertile alluvial plain formed by silt from the Indus. This area has been inhabited by agricultural civilizations for at least 5,000 years.

=== Balochistan ===
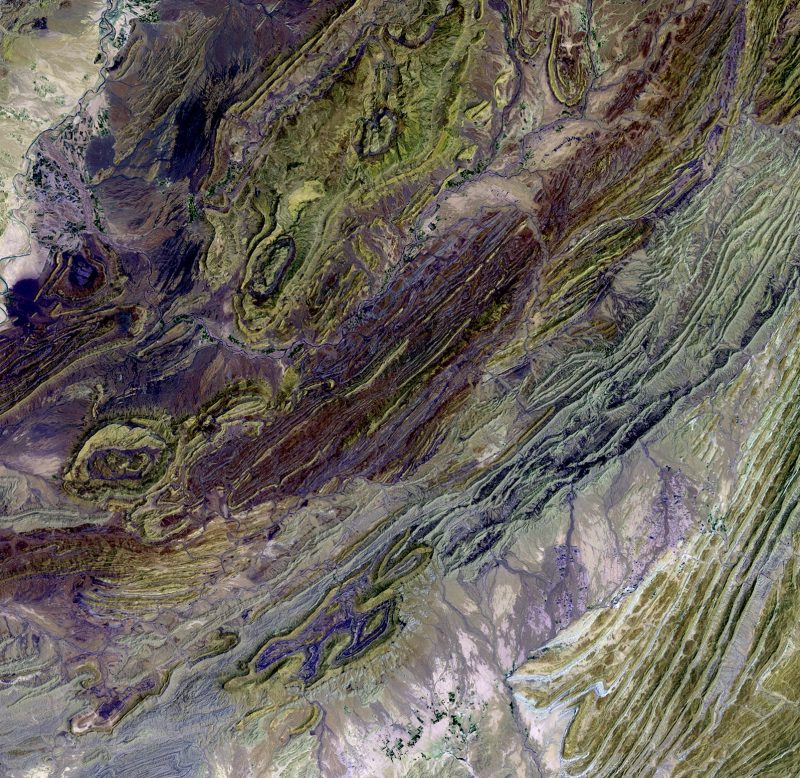
Satellite image of the Sulaiman Range

Balochistan (or Baluchistan) is located at the eastern edge of the Iranian plateau and in the border region between Southwest, Central, and South Asia. It is geographically the largest of the four provinces at 347,190 km^{2} (134,050 sq mi) of Pakistani territory; and composes 48% of the total land area of Pakistan. The population density is very low due to the mountainous terrain and scarcity of water. The southern region is known as Makran. The central region is known as Kalat.

The Sulaiman Mountains dominate the northeast corner and the Bolan Pass is a natural route into Afghanistan towards Kandahar. Much of the province south of the Quetta region is sparse desert terrain with pockets of inhabitable towns mostly near rivers and streams. The largest desert is the Kharan Desert which occupies the most of Kharan District.

This area is subject to frequent seismic disturbances because the tectonic plate under the Indian plate hits the plate under Eurasia as it continues to move northward and to push the Himalayas ever higher. The region surrounding Quetta is highly prone to earthquakes. A severe quake in 1931 was followed by one of more destructive force in 1935. The small city of Quetta was almost completely destroyed, and the adjacent military cantonment was heavily damaged. At least 20,000 people were killed. Tremors continue in the vicinity of Quetta. The most recent major earthquakes include the October 2005 Kashmir earthquake in which nearly 10,000 people died and the 2008 Balochistan earthquake occurred in October 2008 in which 215 people were killed. In January 1991 a severe earthquake destroyed entire villages in the Khyber-Pakhtunkhwa, but far fewer people were killed in the quake than died in 1935. A major earthquake centered in the Khyber-Pakhtunkhwa's Kohistan District in 1965 also caused heavy damage.

== Climate ==
Pakistan map of climate classification zones

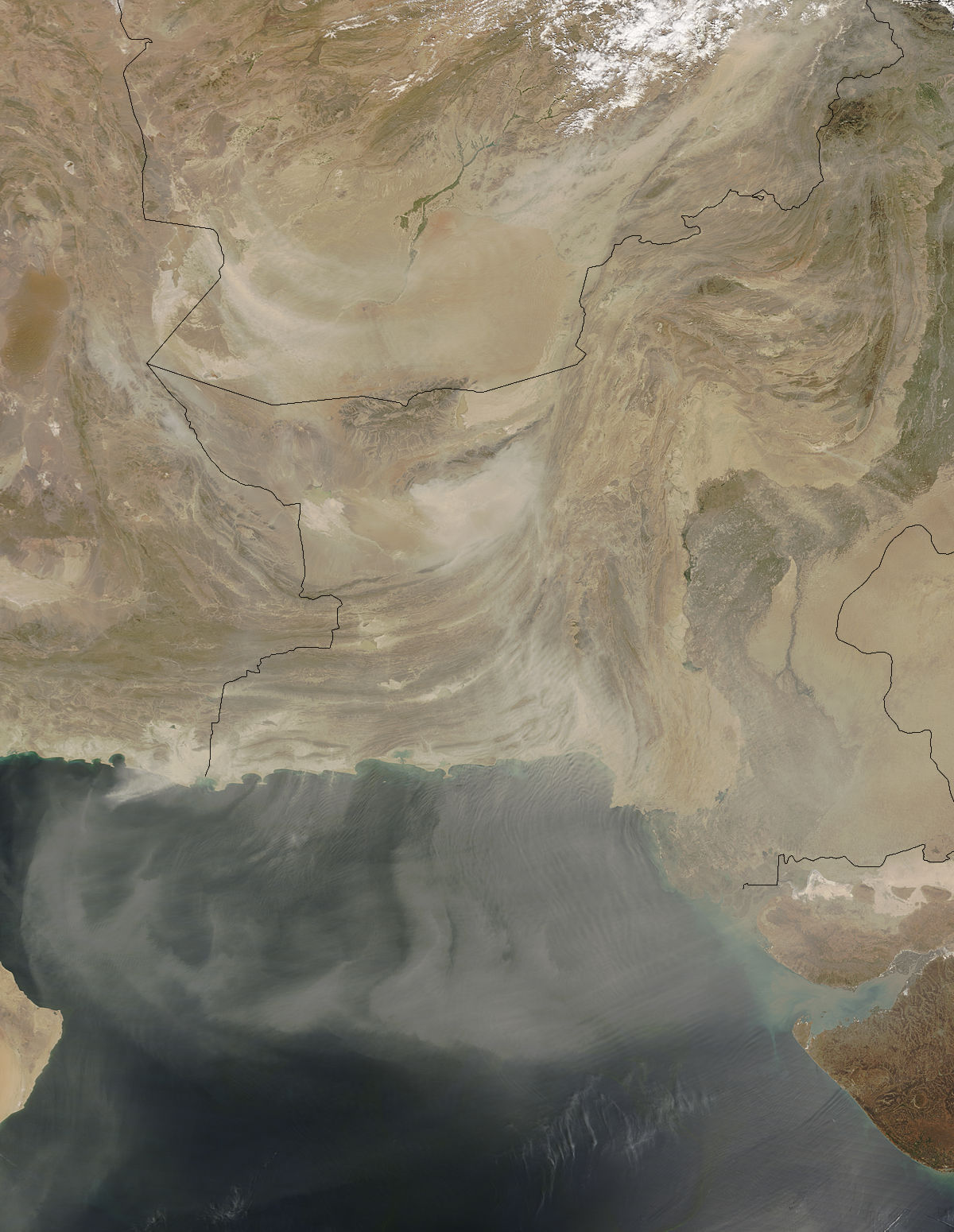
Dust storm over Pakistan and surrounding countries, 7 April 2005

Pakistan lies in the temperate zone, immediately above the tropic of cancer. The climate varies from tropical to temperate. Arid conditions exist in the coastal south, characterized by a monsoon season with adequate rainfall and a dry season with lesser rainfall, while abundant rainfall is experienced by the province of Punjab, and wide variations between extremes of temperature at given locations. Rainfall varies from as little as less than 10 inches a year to over 150 inches a year, in various parts of the nation. These generalizations should not, however, obscure the distinct differences existing among particular locations. For example, the coastal area along the Indian Ocean is usually warm, whereas the frozen snow-covered ridges of the Karakoram Range and of other mountains of the far north are so cold year round that they are only accessible by world-class climbers for a few weeks in May and June of each year.

Pakistan has four seasons: a cool, dry winter marked by mild temperatures from December through February; a hot, dry spring from March through May; the summer rainy season, or southwest monsoon period, from June through September; and the retreating monsoon period of October and November. The onset and duration of these seasons vary somewhat according to location.

The climate in the capital city of Islamabad varies from an average daily low of 2 °C (35.6 °F) in January to an average daily high of 38 °C (100 °F) in June. Half of the annual rainfall occurs in July and August, averaging about 300 millimetres (11.81 in) in each of those two months. The remainder of the year has significantly less rain, amounting to about 100 millimetres (3.94 in) per month. Hailstorms are common in early spring.

Pakistan's largest city, Karachi, which is also the country's industrial center, is more humid than Islamabad but gets significantly lesser rainfall. Only July and August average more than 50 millimetres (1.97 in) of rainfall in the Karachi area; the remaining months are exceedingly dry with little rainfall. The temperature is also more uniform in Karachi than in Islamabad, ranging from an average daily low of 13 °C (55.4 °F) during winter evenings to an average daily high of 34 °C (93.2 °F) on summer days. Although the summer temperatures do not get as high as those in Punjab, the high humidity causes the residents a great deal of discomfort.

=== Water resources ===
Pakistan is the fifteenth most water stressed country in the world.

Hydrological power is a renewable resource which benefits Pakistan a lot. After the Indus Water Treaty in 1960 World Bank decided that River Sutlej, Ravi and Beas water will be used by India and River Indus, Jhelum and Chenab water will be used by Pakistan. Pakistan was told to build two dams, one tarbela and second Mangla, five barrages, eight link canals, and one gated siphon. For this, India was told to participate 60%, whereas Pakistan, 40%. Pakistan is considering to develop wind turbines to fulfill the demand for electricity. Solar power is now slowly flourishing but it is still installed on a small scale.

Pakistan largest river is known as the Indus River which flows from Tibet/China and enters Pakistan through Gilgit Baltistan. The Indus River system is divided into two plains. The Upper Indus Plain starts from northern Pakistan and ends up at Mithankot. The Indus has tributaries on both western and eastern side. The Indus' eastern tributaries are the Jhelum, Chenab, Sutlej, Ravi and Beas. These four rivers flow in Punjab and meet at Panjnad where they are known as Panjnad river. The Indus' western tributaries are the Swat, Kabul, Kurrram, Tochi, Gomal, Zhob rivers which join the Indus at KPK. At Mithankot these rivers finally meet with the River Indus. After this the Indus flows alone through the Lower Indus Plain. Lower Indus Plain starts from Mithankot up to Thatta where the Indus meets with the Indian Ocean. This place is also known as Indus Delta.

=== Fuel resources ===
Pakistan has extensive energy resources, including fairly sizable natural gas reserves, petroleum oil reserves, coal fields and large hydropower potential.

=== Agriculture ===
About 26% of Pakistan's total land area is under cultivation and is watered by one of the largest irrigation systems in the world. The most important crops are cotton, wheat, rice, sugarcane, maize, sorghum, millets, pulses, oil seeds, barley, fruits and vegetables, which together account for more than 75% of the value of total crop output.

=== Fishery ===
Fishery and fishing industry plays an important role in the national economy of Pakistan. With a coastline of about 1046 km, Pakistan has enough fishery resources that remain to be fully developed. It is also a major source of export earning.

=== Forestry ===
About only 4.1% of land in Pakistan is covered with forests. The forests of Pakistan are a main source of food, lumber, paper, fuel wood, latex, medicine as well as used for purposes of wildlife conservation and Eco tourism.

=== Mining ===
The Salt Range in the Potwar Plateau has large deposits of rock salt. Pakistan has extensive mineral resources, including fairly sizable reserves of gypsum, limestone, chromites, iron ore, rock salt, silver, gold, precious stones, gems, marbles, tiles, copper, sulfur, fire clay and silica sand.

== Environment and conservation ==
The environmental issues is a great problem for the nature and nation of Pakistan and has been disturbing the balance between economic development and environmental protection. As Pakistan is a large importer of both exhaustible and renewable natural resources and a large consumer of fossil fuels, the Ministry of Environment of Government of Pakistan takes responsibility to conserve and protect the environment.

Current issues: water pollution from raw sewage, industrial wastes, and agricultural runoff; limited natural fresh water resources; a majority of the population does not have access to potable water; deforestation; soil erosion; desertification.

=== Natural disasters ===
Pakistan is subject to frequent earthquakes which are often severe (especially in north and west) and severe flooding along the Indus after heavy rains (July and August). Landslides are common in the northern mountains.

=== Protected areas ===
There are 35 national parks, 135 wildlife sanctuaries, 160 game reserves, 9 marine and littoral protected areas, 19 protected wetlands and a number of other protected grasslands, shrublands, woodlands and natural monuments.

=== Tidal Flats ===
A recent global remote sensing analysis suggested that there were 1,575 km^{2} of tidal flats in Pakistan, making it the 20th ranked country in terms of how much tidal flat occurs there.

=== International agreements ===
Pakistan is a party to several international agreements related to environment and climate, the most prominent among them are:

Treaties and Agreements
Specific Regions and Seas	Law of the Sea, Ship Pollution (MARPOL 73/78)
Atmosphere and Climate	Climate Change, Ozone Layer Protection, Nuclear Test Ban
Biodiversity, Environment, and Forests	Desertification, Endangered Species, Environmental Modification, Wetlands, Marine Life Conservation
Wastes	Hazardous Wastes
Rivers	Indus Waters Treaty

== Suffix of regions and towns ==
Parts of region and settlement names:

- -abad (Urdu: ـ آباد) means settled place. Example: Islamabad, Faisalabad.
- -dera (Urdu: ڈیره ـ) means meeting place. Example: Dera Ismail Khan, Dera Ghazai Khan.
- -garh (Urdu: ـ گڑھ) means fort or settlement. Example: Islamgarh, Muzaffargarh.
- -goth (Urdu: ـ گوٹھ) means settlement or town. Example: Yousuf Goth.
- -istan (Urdu: ـستان) means land. Example: Baltistan, Balochistan.
- Khel or -khel (Urdu: خیل) denotes a Pashtun sub-tribe. Example: Darra Adam Khel (Urdu: درہ آدم خیل).
- -kot (Urdu: ـکوٹ) means settlement or town. Example: Islamkot, Sialkot, Kot Aduu.
- -nagar (Urdu: ـ نگر) means house. Example: Islamnagar.
- -pur (Urdu: ـ پُور) means settlement or town. Example: Nasarpur, Khanpur.
- -wal (Urdu: ـوال) means settlement or town. Example: Khanewal.
- -wala (Urdu: ـوالا) means settlement or town. Example: Gujranwala.
- -tando (Urdu: ٹنڈو ـ) means settlement or town. Example: Tando Allahyar.

== See also ==
- Climate of Pakistan
- Extreme points of Pakistan
- Fisheries Research and Training Institute, Lahore Pakistan
- Geology of Pakistan
- Land border crossings of Pakistan
