= Conservation in Pakistan =

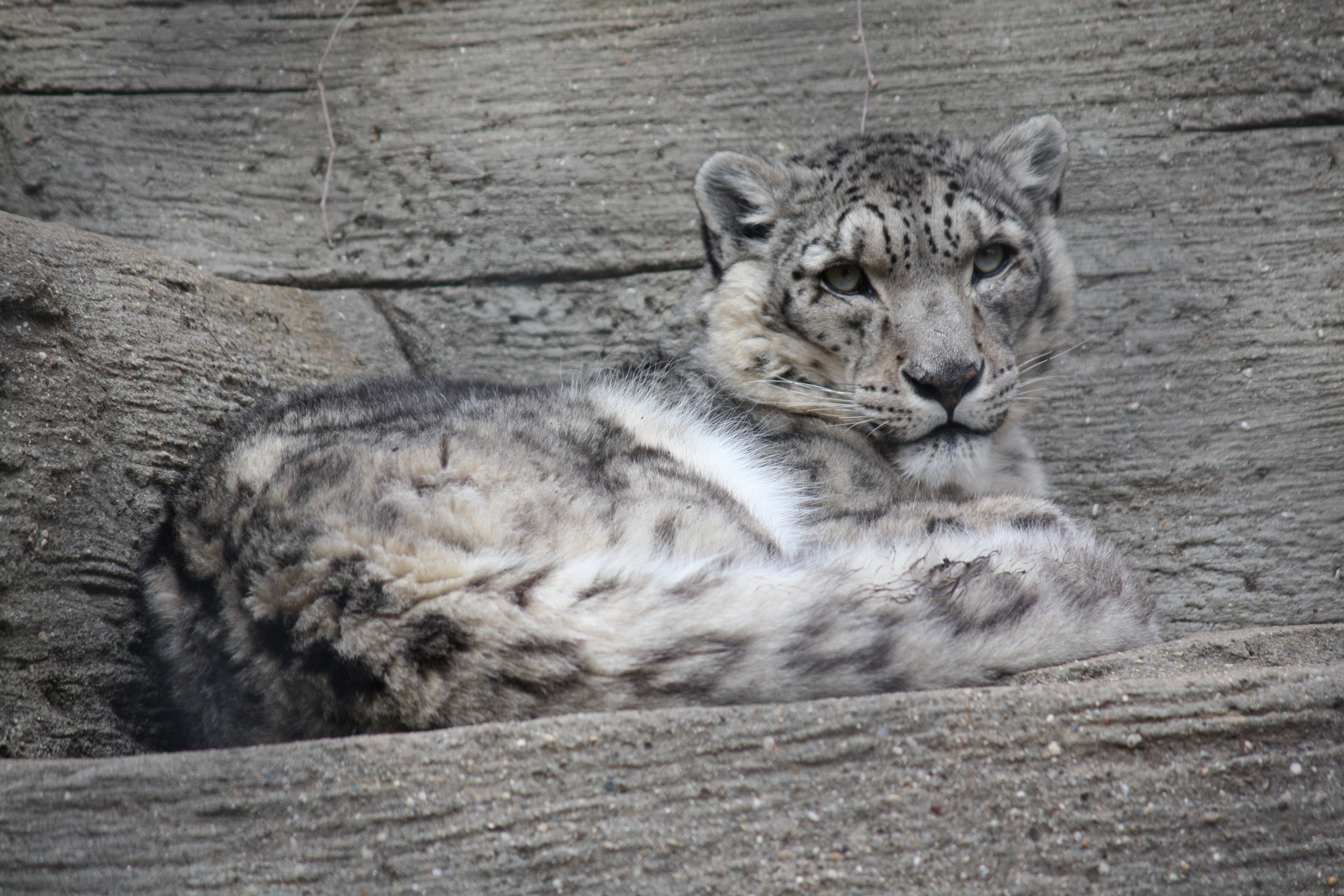
The snow leopard, is the state-sanctioned heritage animal of Pakistan

Conservation in Pakistan is the act of preserving, guarding, or protecting, biodiversity, environment, and natural resources of Pakistan.

== Protected areas ==
The protected areas serve the purpose of conserving the forests and wildlife of Pakistan. National Conservation Strategy of 1993 was a major landmark of start of conservation of natural resources and wildlife in Pakistan. Resource-managed man-made forests like Changa Manga, Kamalia plantation and Chichawatni plantation have also been planted to serve purpose and conserve forests. Through conservation, a large region of Thal desert has been afforested.

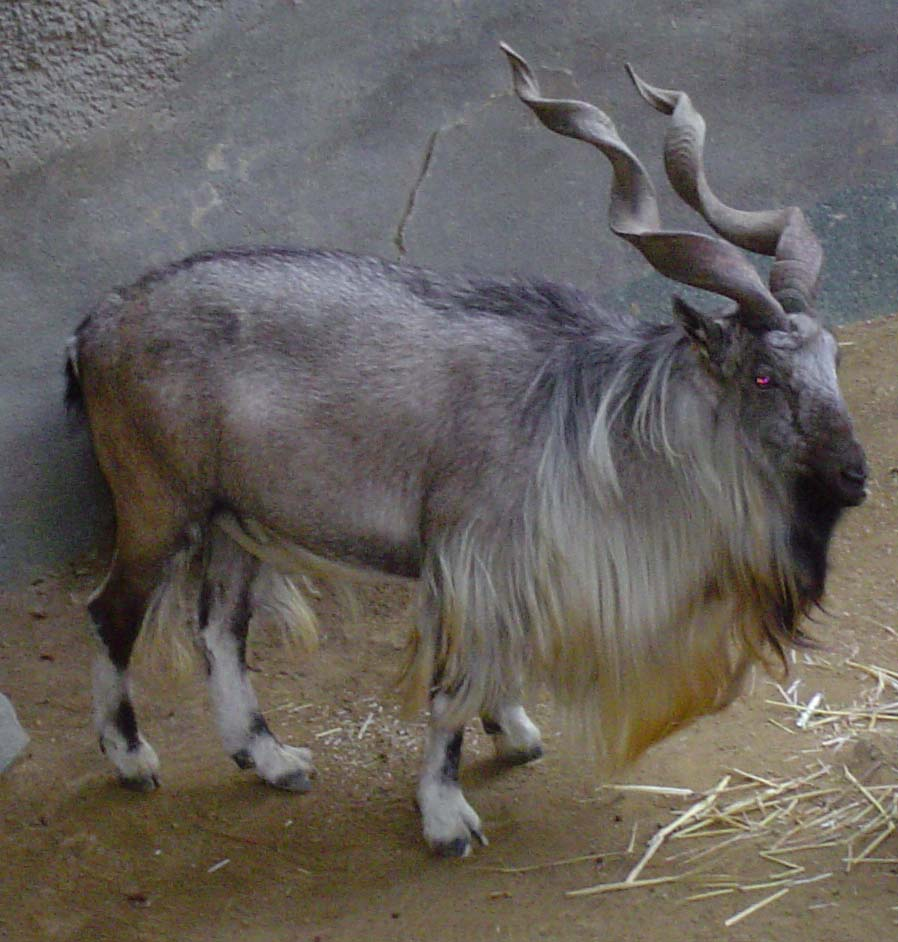
The markhor, is the national animal of Pakistan

Natural protected forests

- Birir Valley Coniferous Forest in Chitral District (also called 'Deodar Chilghoza Oak Forest')
- Jhangar Scrub Forest in Chakwal District
- Sulaiman Coniferous Forest in Khyber Pukhtunkhwa (also called 'Sulaiman Chilgoza Pine Forest')
- Ziarat Juniper Forest in Ziarat District

Artificial resource managed forests

- Changa Manga Forest in Lahore District
- Chichawatni Plantation in Sahiwal District
- Khipro Reserve Forest in Sanghar District

== Endangered species ==
- List of endangered species in Pakistan

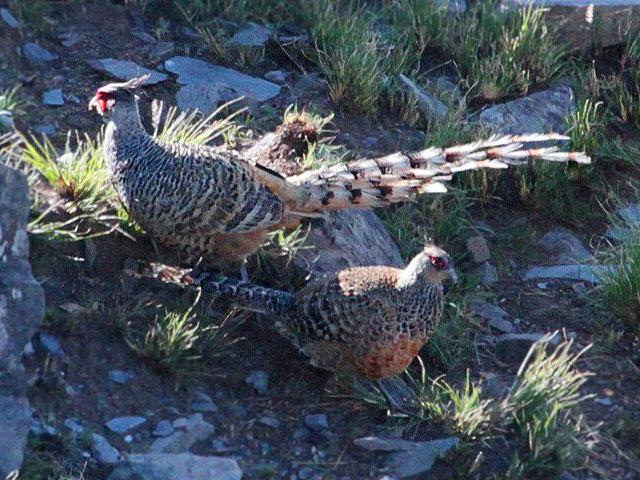
Cheer pheasant pair from Himalaya

Cheer pheasant, which became extinct in Pakistan, was planned to be reintroduced in the region. The World Pheasants Association sent 90 eggs of the species to the Dhodial Pheasantry. Among the eggs which hatched, the mortality was high and remained high till 1995. This situation got better in 1996. In 1997, a parent flock of 40 pairs was raised and eventually reintroduction of the cheer pheasant in Hazara District was carried out. As of 2007, there are around 60 pairs of cheer pheasant in the Dhodial Pheasantry.

Pakistan Crane Center is a conservation center for the captive breeding of common crane and demoiselle crane. It is located west of Kurram River in Lakki Marwat, Khyber Pakhtunkhwa, Pakistan, 250 kilometres (155 mi) south of Peshawar. The center is equipped with a total of 15 circular aviaries as well as an education block for visitors. The center is operated by the Bannu Wildlife Division, Bannu and Pakistan Wetlands Programme of Ministry of Environment (Pakistan). The programme is funded by WWF - Pakistan, GEF, UNDP and Darwin Initiative.

== Notable conservation organisations ==
World Wide Fund For Nature

(WWF - Pakistan)

Pakistan Environmental Protection Agency (PEPA)

Himalayan Wildlife Foundation (HWF)

== See also ==
- Environment of Pakistan
- Forestry in Pakistan
- List of endangered species in Pakistan
- Protected areas of Pakistan
- Dhodial Pheasantry
