= WWF–Pakistan =

Pakistan based environmental conservation organization

WWF-Pakistan (World Wide Fund for Nature Pakistan)
- Abbreviation: WWF-Pakistan
- Formation: 1970
- Founded at: Pakistan
- Purpose: Environmental conservation
- Location: Pakistan
- Parent organization: World Wide Fund for Nature
- Website: www.wwfpak.org

The WWF-Pakistan (World Wide Fund for Nature Pakistan) is a leading environmental conservation organization in Pakistan, established in 1970 as part of the global WWF network. Over the past five decades, WWF-Pakistan has been at the forefront of nature conservation in the country, initiating numerous projects and programs aimed at preserving biodiversity, promoting environmental education, and advocating for sustainable development.

== History ==
WWF-Pakistan was founded in 1970 as an integral part of the worldwide environmental movement. Its inception aimed to address the emerging conservation challenges by filling the awareness and knowledge gaps present within the government and the general public. The overarching goal was to pave the way for a future in which people could coexist harmoniously with nature, emphasizing a sustainable and balanced relationship between humanity and the environment.

During its initial stages, WWF-Pakistan was a modest organization, mainly funded by individuals and benefiting from voluntary scientific contributions. In the late 1980s, they kicked off their first official environmental education project. Following this, WWF-Pakistan quickly broadened its programs to enhance its conservation initiatives.

Today, WWF-Pakistan stands as one of the leading organizations dedicated to environmental and nature conservation within Pakistan. It operates independently, officially registered under the Pakistan Societies Act of 1860, and holds non-profit status certified by the Pakistan Centre of Philanthropy. The organization is governed by a Board of Governors.

Starting as a small-scale operation with just one room and one employee, the organization has evolved into Pakistan's largest environmental entity. Their core mission revolves around preserving nature in the country.

=== 50-Year Celebration ===
In 2023, WWF-Pakistan marked its 50th anniversary by recognizing conservation champions who have made notable contributions to nature conservation in Pakistan. The celebratory event brought together over 150 attendees from diverse backgrounds, including corporate sector representatives, WWF Pakistan's Goodwill Ambassadors, members of WWF Pakistan's Board of Governors, government officials, media partners, and WWF-Pakistan staff.

== Achievements and initiatives ==
=== Key Biodiversity Areas (KBA) ===
WWF-Pakistan has taken a proactive step by initiating a dialogue on Key Biodiversity Areas (KBA) in collaboration with the KBA Secretariat, the Engro Foundation, and the Darwin Initiative. This joint effort is geared towards the conservation of biodiversity in Pakistan by focusing on Key Biodiversity Areas, highlighting the organization's commitment to protecting critical natural habitats and species.

=== Coastal Cleanup Project ===
In partnership with PepsiCo Pakistan, WWF-Pakistan inaugurated a Coastal Clean-up Project at the Karachi Fish Harbour. Aligned with PepsiCo's global sustainability agenda, PepsiCo Positive (pep+), the initiative focuses on gathering and managing plastic waste effectively through an extensive coastal clean-up activation.

=== Sustainable infrastructure initiative ===
WWF-Pakistan introduced the "Sustainable Infrastructure Initiative" in Gilgit. This initiative is designed to provide support to grassroots-level organizations, research-based institutions, researchers, and students, with the goal of enhancing and reinforcing nature conservation efforts throughout Pakistan. It demonstrates WWF-Pakistan's commitment to nurturing conservation efforts and building a sustainable infrastructure that aligns with environmental conservation goals.

=== Small Grants Programme (SGP) ===
Since 1986, the Small Grants Programme (SGP) of WWF-Pakistan has played a pivotal role in providing support to grassroots-level organizations, research-based institutions, researchers, and students. Its objective is to bolster nature conservation efforts across Pakistan. Over the years, SGP has significantly contributed to empowering local initiatives and fostering a greater sense of environmental stewardship at the community level.

=== Wildlife Diaries of Pakistan ===
WWF-Pakistan unveiled the trailer for its wildlife documentary series, titled "Wildlife Diaries of Pakistan", on 14 August 2023, coinciding with Pakistan's 76th Independence Day. The release showcased the wildlife and natural heritage of Pakistan.

== Future Plans ==
WWF-Pakistan has outlined a comprehensive plan to persist in its endeavors towards conserving biodiversity, advancing environmental research, and enhancing the capacity of small grassroots-level organizations. A central focus of these efforts is to tackle the dual challenges of human-induced climate change and biodiversity loss, both of which pose significant threats to the survival and well-being of present and future generations.
