= Forestry in Pakistan =

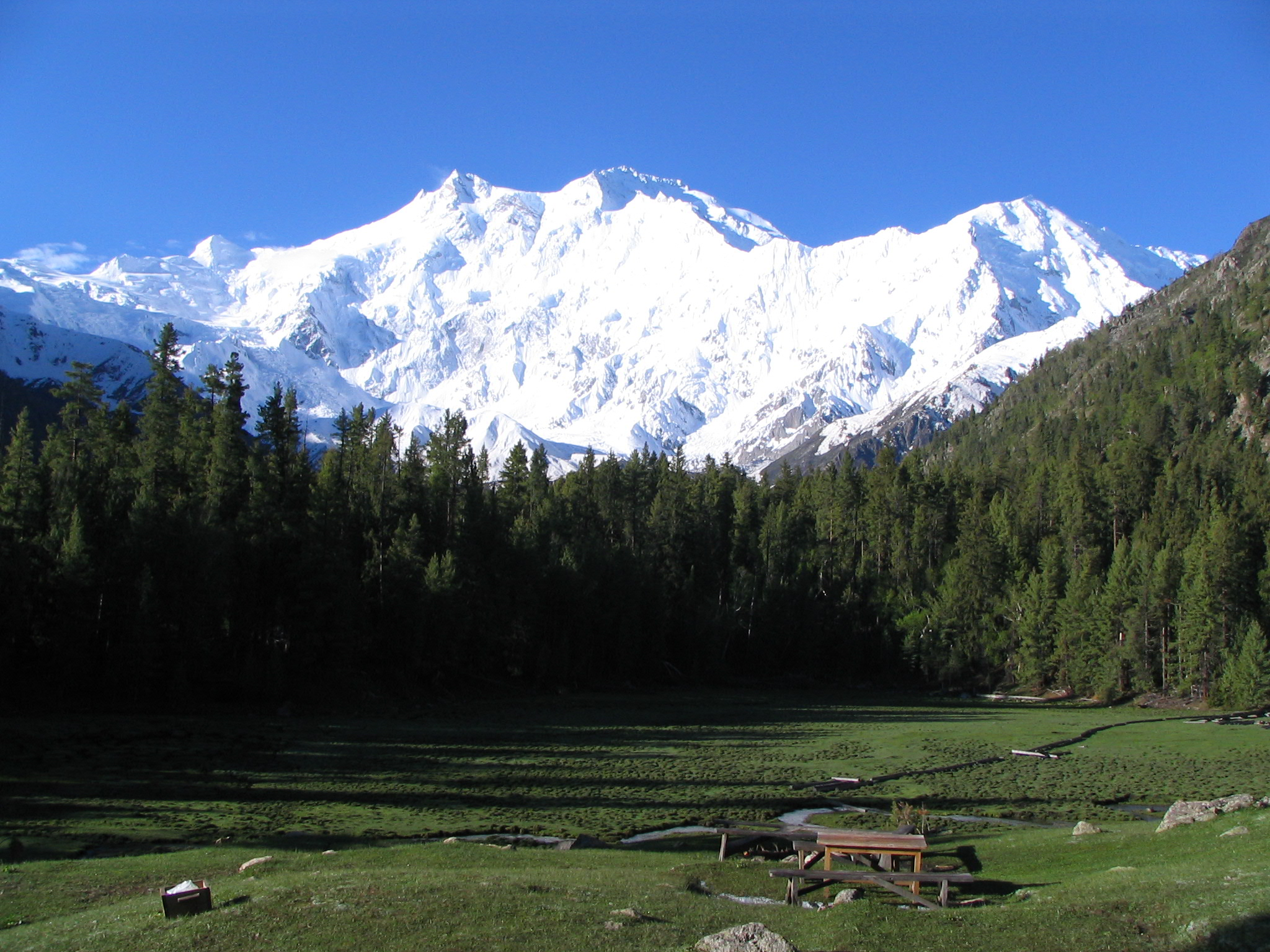
View of Fairy Meadows at Nanga Parbat National Park showing conifer forest of Picea smithiana and Pinus wallichiana.

The forestry sector of Pakistan is a main source of the country's lumber, paper, fuelwood, latex, medicine as well as food and offers ecotourism and wildlife conservation. 5% of Pakistan's land is covered in forest (2024). The Shangla District is the only district of Pakistan where more than 80% of area is covered by forests.

== Statistics ==
Total forest area coverage in km^{2} (source)
Parameter	Pakistan	Asia	World
Total forest area in 2000	23,610	5,041,800	38,694,550
Natural forest area in 2000	13,810	3,758,240	36,827,220
Plantations area in 2000	9,800	1,109,530	1,867,330
Total dryland area in 1981	725,240	10,781,210	50,599,840
Percentage of forests	~4.97%	~22%	~29%

The percentage of Pakistan's area that is forest is disputed. The UN's Food and Agriculture Organisation estimates 2.2% of the total land of Pakistan is covered by forests. On the contrary, Pakistan Forest Institute estimates it to be 5.1%. According to the survey done under the Red Plus programme in 2017, the forest cover of Pakistan is 5.7%.

According to survey under Red Plus programme, the Azad Jammu and Kashmir has the highest forest cover at 36.9%, followed by Khyber Pakhtunkhwa (20.3%), Islamabad (22.6%) and Federally Administered Tribal Areas (19.5%). The World Wild Fund report that between 2000 and 2010 Pakistan has lost 43,000 hectares of land every year.

In 2017, the forest cover by district (includes private ownership) in Khyber Pakhtunkhwa province was as below:

- Abbottabad: 199,710 acres (808.2 km^{2})
- Bannu: 35,587 acres (144.02 km^{2})
- Battagram: 246,839 acres (998.92 km^{2})
- Buner: 273,765 acres (1,107.89 km^{2})
- Charsadda: 176,877 acres (715.80 km^{2})
- Chitral: 125,677 acres (508.60 km^{2})
- D.I.Khan: 74,525 acres (301.59 km^{2})
- Dir Lower: 133,858 acres (541.70 km^{2})
- Dir Upper: 641,306 acres (2,595.27 km^{2})
- Hangu 181,645 acres (735.09 km^{2})
- Haripur: 184,271 acres (745.72 km^{2})
- Karak: 87,604 acres (354.52 km^{2})
- Kohat: 70,654 acres (285.93 km^{2})
- Kohistan: 481,064 acres (1,946.80 km^{2})
- Lakki: 44,430 acres (179.8 km^{2})
- Malakand: 30,479 acres (123.34 km^{2})
- Mansehra: 536,423 acres (2,170.83 km^{2})
- Mardan: 91,729 acres (371.21 km^{2})
- Nowshera: 178,142 acres (720.92 km^{2})
- Peshawar: 55,043 acres (222.75 km^{2})
- Shangla: 180,430 acres (730.2 km^{2})
- Swabi: 110,371 acres (446.66 km^{2})
- Swat: 409,591 acres (1,657.56 km^{2})
- Tank: 188,919 acres (764.53 km^{2})

== Types ==
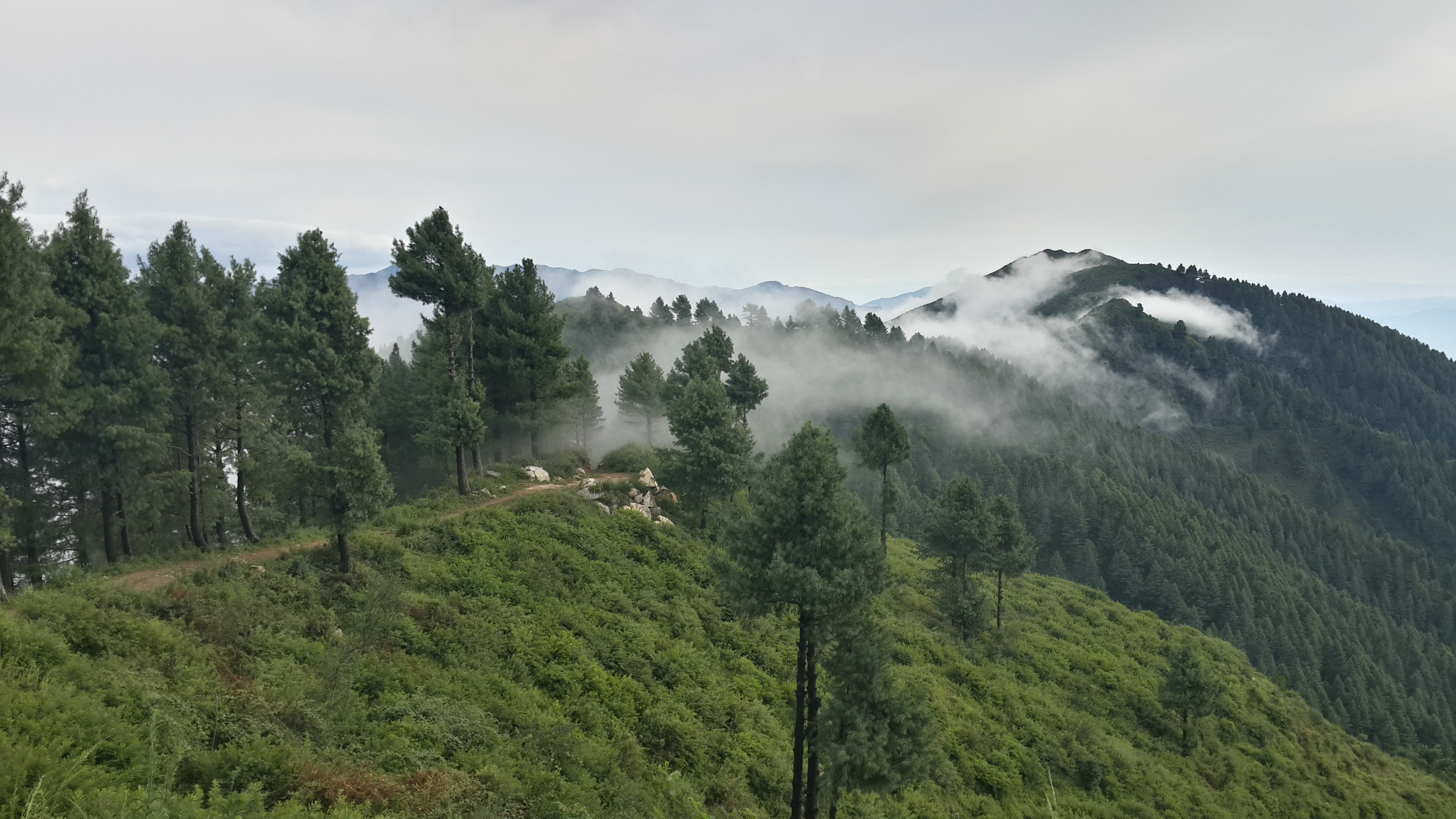
Lajbook, Lower Dir

- The coniferous forests occur from 1,000 to 4,000 m altitudes. Chitral, Swat, Upper Dir, Lower Dir, Malakand, Mansehra and Abbottabad districts of Khyber Pakhtunkhwa, Azad Kashmir and Rawalpindi district of the Punjab are the main areas covered with coniferous forests. Pindrow Fir (Abies pindrow), Morinda spruce (Picea smithiana), deodar (Cedrus deodara), blue pine (Pinus wallichiana), chir pine (Pinus roxburghii) are the most common varieties. The Coniferous forests also occur in Balochistan hills. Chilghoza pine (Pinus gerardiana) and the Pashtun juniper (Juniperus seravschanica) are the two most common species of Balochistan.

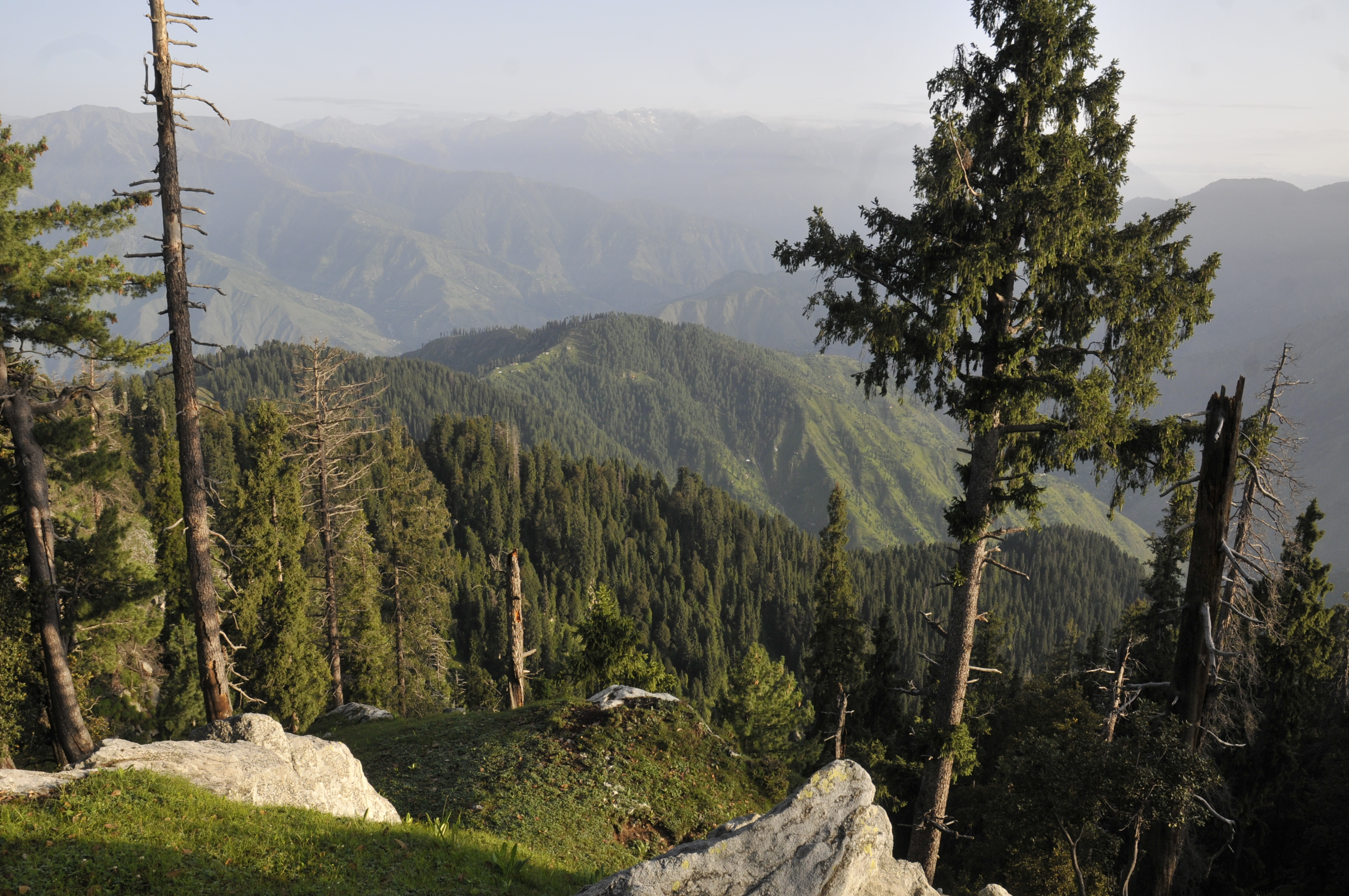
Miandam, Swat

- The sub-tropical dry forests are found in the Attock, Rawalpindi, Islamabad, Jhelum and Gujrat districts of the Punjab, and in the Mansehra, Abbottabad, Mardan, Peshawar and Kohat districts of Khyber Pakhtunkhwa up to a height of 1,000 m. In Balochistan, they are confined to the Sulaiman Mountains and other hilly areas. Dominant tree species are phulai (Senegalia modesta), sheesham (Dalbergia sissoo), kau (Olea cuspidata) and hopbush (Dodonaea viscosa).
- The subtropical humid forests are found only on the Margalla hills and possibly in parts of southern Azad Kashmir. The sumbal (Bombax ceiba), kachnar (Bauhinia variegata), dhak (Butea monosperma), amla (Phyllanthus emblica), phulai (Senegalia modesta) banyan (Ficus benghalensis), pipal (Ficus religiosa), Cluster fig (Ficus racemosa), elephant ear fig (Ficus auriculata), kamala (Mallotus philippensis), jamun (Syzygium cumini) and many other species are native to this area.
- The tropical thorn forests are dominated by xerophytic shrubs. They are most widespread in the Punjab plains but also occupy small areas in southern Sindh and western Balochistan. They are mainly used for grazing purposes, watershed protection and fuelwood. Common species are vann (Salvadora oleoides), khejri (Prosopis cineraria), kair (Capparis aphylla), etc.
- The irrigated plantations were first developed in 1866 at Changa Manga in Lahore. Today they occupy about 226,000 ha. Sheesham (Dalbergia sissoo), mulberry/Shahtoot (Morus alba), babul (Acacia nilotica) and species of Eucalyptus and Populus are the common tree species grown in the irrigated plantations.
- The riparian forests grow in narrow belts along the banks of River Indus and its tributaries. They are more commonly found in Sindh and to some extent in the Punjab. Babul (Acacia nilotica), Shisham (Dalbergia sissoo), Banyan (Ficus benghalensis) and Tamarisk (Tamarax dioica) are the most common species. Khejri (Prosopis cineraria) and Populus euphratica are some other species. They are mainly used for lumber.
- The mangrove wetlands are located in the Indus River Delta. Other saltwater wetlands are located on the coast of Balochistan such as at Sonmiani and Jiwani. These support mangrove forestry, mainly of species Avicennia marina as well as bamboo species and Coconut, as well as marsh grasses of Apluda and Cenchrus.

Ecosystems area by type in 1993 (source)
Ecosystem type	Pakistan	Asia	World
Shrublands, woodlands and grasslands	36%	37%	37%
Sparse or barren vegetation; snow and ice	34%	10%	16%
Cropland and natural vegetation mosaic	28%	34%	20%
Wetlands and water bodies	1%	2%	3%

== Uses ==
The forests of Pakistan are a main source of lumber, paper, fuelwood, latex, medicine as well as human and animal food. Other minor products include resin (a fluid in tissue of Chir pine plant that becomes solid on exposure to the air) and 'mazri' (used for making baskets). The forests also provide for ecotourism and wildlife conservation purposes. Forests have also been planted in some areas like Thal Desert to avoid soil erosion and further desertification. Riparian zone along the river Indus have been managed to avoid excess flooding.

Annual production, 1996-1998 (source)
Parameter	Pakistan	Asia	World
Total production (000m³)	31,528	1,111,958	3,261,621
Fuelwood production (000m³)	29,312	863,316	1,739,504
Industrial roundwood production (000m³)	2,217	268,470	1,522,116
Paper (thousand metric tons)	619	88,859	313,206

== Deforestation ==
According to the UN in 2011, Pakistan was the most heavily deforested country in Asia. The Federal Bureau of Statistics provisionally valued the deforestation sector at Rs.25,637 million in 2005, thus registering over 3% decline of forests in Pakistan since 2000. The main reasons of deforestation are urbanization, farming, overgrazing, and tourism development. Wildlife in Pakistan is confronting a critical situation, marked by the dwindling populations of numerous species. This decline is primarily attributed to pressing threats, including illegal wildlife trade, habitat loss due to urbanization, rising pollution levels, and the impacts of climate change.

This has led to severe consequences such as desertification, flooding and endangering of wildlife. As a consequence to deforestation and changing land use patterns, the most critically affected ecosystems of Pakistan are:

- Juniper forests of northern Baluchistan have been heavily harvested for timber and fuel wood.
- Ecological changes in the Indus River riparian zone have drastically affected the riverine forests. Large tracts have been cleared for agriculture.
- The Himalayan temperate forests are also under severe pressure from logging for timber and firewood, and from clearings for agriculture and human settlements. Deforestation rate in Pakistan is increasing 0.2 to 0.5 percent annually.

== Conservation ==
The protected areas serve the purpose of conserving the forests and wildlife of Pakistan. National Conservation Strategy of 1993 was a major landmark of start of conservation of natural resources and wildlife in Pakistan. Resource-managed man-made forests like Changa Manga, Kamalia plantation and Chichawatni plantation have also been planted to serve purpose and conserve forests. Through conservation, a large region of Thal desert has been afforested.

Natural protected forests

- Birir Valley Coniferous Forest in Chitral District (also called 'Deodar Chilghoza Oak Forest')
- Jhangar Scrub Forest in Chakwal District
- Sulaiman Coniferous Forest in Khyber Pukhtunkhwa (also called 'Sulaiman Chilgoza Pine Forest')
- Ziarat Juniper Forest in Ziarat District

Artificial resource managed forests

- Changa Manga Forest in Kasur District
- Chichawatni Plantation in Sahiwal District
- Khipro Reserve Forest in Sanghar District

== Organizations ==
=== Research institutions ===
- Shaheed Benazir Bhutto University, Sheringal, Upper Dir
- Government College University Faisalabad, Faisalabad
- Agricultural Research Institute, Quetta
- Punjab Forest School, Bahawalpur
- Pakistan Forest Institute, Peshawar
- University of Agriculture, Peshawar
- Sindh Agriculture University, Hyderabad
- University of Agriculture, Faisalabad
- University of Haripur, Haripur District
- Pir Mehr Ali Shah Arid Agriculture University, Rawalpindi
- Institute of Agriculture Sciences and Forestry University of Swat, Swat District

Punjab Forestry Research Institutes, Gatwala Faisalabad Punjab Wildlife Institutes Gatwala Faisalabad

== See also ==
- Agriculture in Pakistan
- Ecoregions of Pakistan
- Environmental issues in Pakistan
- Ministry of Environment
- Protected areas of Pakistan
- Tourism in Pakistan
- Wildlife of Pakistan
- Forestry in India
