= Protected areas of Pakistan =

IUCN protected areas

As of present, there are around 400 protected areas in Pakistan that are recognized by International Union for Conservation of Nature (IUCN). The total protected land area represents 13% of Pakistan's landmass as of 2020, The Government of Pakistan plans to increase it to at least 15% by 2023. As a signatory of the UN Convention on Biological Diversity, Pakistan is committed to expanding its protected areas to encompass 17% of its total territory by the year 2030. This ambitious goal aims to ensure the long-term conservation of nature, safeguard vital ecosystem services, and preserve the cultural values associated with these protected areas.

== Statistics ==
Category	Total sites	Total area	Ref.(s)
National parks	37	1,191,323 ha	
Wildlife sanctuaries	100	4,912,531 ha	
Game reserves	77	3,026,842 ha	
Ramsar protected wetlands	19	1,343,807 ha	
Marine protected areas	2	43,647 ha	
Biosphere reserves	4	926,205 ha	

=== IUCN categories ===
IUCN Category	Total sites
IUCN Category Ia: Strict nature reserves	0
IUCN Category Ib: Wilderness area	0
IUCN Category II: National parks	5
IUCN Category III: Natural monuments	0
IUCN Category IV: Wildlife sanctuaries	62
IUCN Category V: Protected landscapes/seascapes	5
IUCN Category VI: Managed resource protected area	2
Unclassified areas	83
All IUCN Categories	157

== See also ==
- Wildlife of Pakistan
- Fauna of Pakistan
- Flora of Pakistan
- Conservation in Pakistan
- Forestry in Pakistan
- Environmental issues in Pakistan
- List of zoos in Pakistan
- Geography of Pakistan
- Tourism in Pakistan
