= Living Indus Initiative =

Climate change initiative in Paskistan

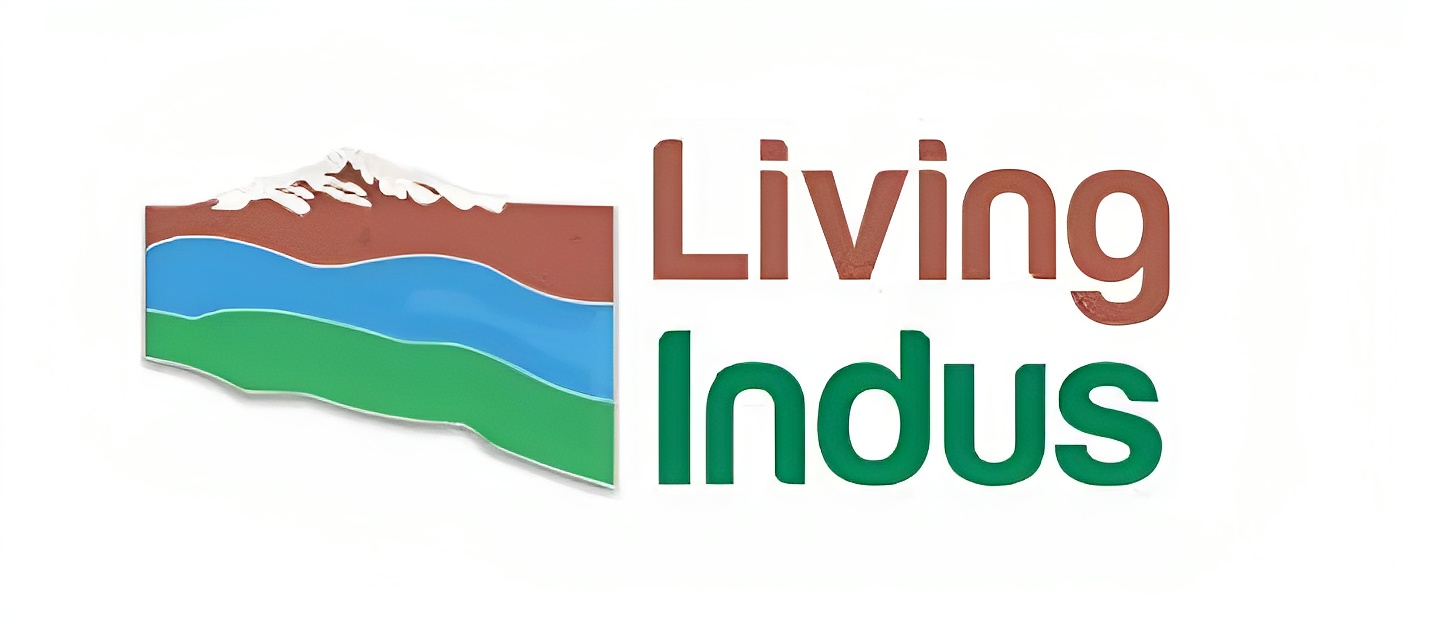
- Formation: 2021
- Type: Environmental initiative
- Legal status: Active
- Purpose: To protect, conserve, and restore natural, terrestrial, freshwater, coastal, and marine ecosystems in the Indus Basin.
- Headquarters: Ministry of Climate Change and Environmental Coordination, Pakistan
- Location: Indus Basin, Pakistan
- Region served: Pakistan
- Website: https://livingindus.com

The Living Indus is an umbrella initiative by Ministry of Climate Change, Government of Pakistan and United Nations in Pakistan.

The original Living Indus Initiative document was developed by a team led by Dr. Adil Najam as its Lead Author. The initiative serves as an overarching program, rallying call to action, seeks to spearhead and unify various efforts aimed at revitalizing the ecological well-being of the Indus River within Pakistan's borders. It emerges as a direct response to Pakistan's heightened susceptibility to the adverse effects of climate change.

== Background ==
The Indus River flows down from the Himalayas, through Indian and Pakistan Administered Kashmir, Gilgit-Baltistan, and Khyber Pakhtunkhwa, flowing south-by-southwest through the length of Pakistan before emptying into the Arabian Sea near Karachi.

Ninety percent of Pakistan's people and more than three-quarters of its economy reside in the Indus basin. More than 80% of Pakistan's arable land is irrigated by its waters.

The Indus Basin is facing devastating challenges due to environmental degradation, unsustainable population growth, rapid urbanization and industrialization, the unregulated utilization of resources, inefficient water use, and poverty. The Indus and its ecosystems are under pressure both from the seemingly inexorable changing climate, temperature fluctuations, disruption of rainfall patterns, and early-stage efforts to adapt to and mitigate these effects.

The Indus has supported a civilization for thousands of years, but with the current state of the management of the basin and the impact of climate change on the monsoon and the glacial melt, it might not be able to sustain Pakistan for another 100 years.

== Description ==
Living Indus is an umbrella initiative and a call to action to lead and consolidate initiatives to restore the ecological health of the Indus within the boundaries of Pakistan. The initiatives have been incorporated into a ‘Living Indus’ prospectus jointly developed by the Government of Pakistan and the United Nations. Initiated in 2021, it has been endorsed by all governments, the initiative is expected to continue receiving support.

The scale of the initiatives requires the adoption of collective and innovative approaches by all stakeholders, including the government, the private sector, and the UN, toward mobilizing resources. The response of Living Indus is one of building resilience and adaptation to the threats the Indus faces from the impacts of both human use and climate change over the next few decades.

A number of specific interventions under the Initiative are now operational, including the 'Recharge Pakistan' project led by the Ministry of Climate Change, Government of Pakistan and WWF-Pakistan.

== Interventions ==
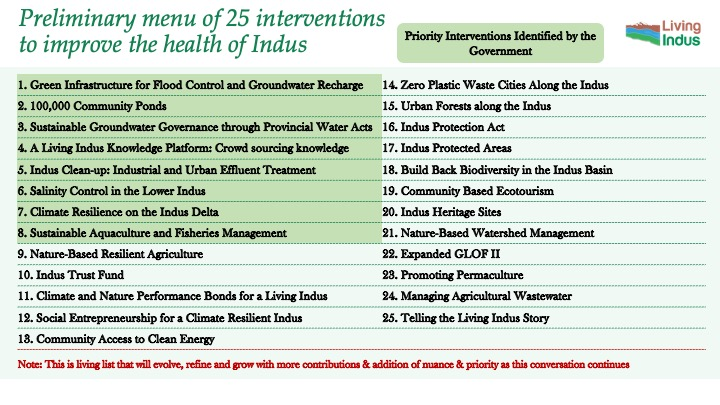
Living Indus Interventions

Extensive consultations with the government, led by the Chief Ministers of all the provinces, the public sector, private sector, experts, and civil society led to a ‘living’ menu of 25 preliminary interventions. These interventions are in line with global best practices, focusing on green infrastructure and nature-based approaches driven by the community.

The Ministry of Climate Change and Environmental Coordination (MoCC&EC), Government of Pakistan has highlighted eight priority interventions out of the 25. Implementation plans are being prepared for these.

== World Restoration Flagship ==
Designated as a World Restoration Flagship by the UN Environment Programme, the Living Indus Initiative embodies the principles of the UN Decade on Ecosystem Restoration. This accolade acknowledges its exemplary contributions to large-scale ecosystem restoration and its alignment with global restoration objectives.

Inger Andersen, executive director of UN Environment Programme stated:

Pakistan's climate induced disasters in recent years have been heart-breaking, causing destruction on a scale that no nation can, or should have to, accept. It is therefore important to recognize and support projects like the Living Indus initiative for the hope and resilience it can offer Pakistan and the region.
