= Pakistan Crane Center, Lakki Marwat =

Crane Conservation Center and Wildlife Park, Lakki Marwat is a conservation center for the captive breeding of various types of wild birds and animal species. It is located west of Kurram River in Lakki Marwat, Khyber Pakhtunkhwa, Pakistan, 250 kilometres (155 mi) south of Peshawar. It was established in 2007. The center is equipped with a total of 15 circular aviaries and 20 cages as well as an education block for visitors. The center is now maintained and operated by Khyber Pakhtunkhwa Wildlife Department through the Bannu Wildlife Division, Bannu while its establishment was funded by WWF - Pakistan, GEF, UNDP and Darwin Initiative.

Lakki Marwat is a seasonal migratory route for cranes. Many residents in nearby towns and villages keep a number of cranes in captivity. These cranes are captured from the wild using stone-weighted ropes tossed up into flocks attracted to live decoys. The programme also aims to teach the advanced breeding methods to these breeders as part of conservation of endangered species of common crane. The total area of the park is 7.59 hectares.

The Khyber Pakhtunkhwa Wildlife Department has established a Crane Conservation Centre and Wildlife park in Bannu Wildlife division. The site fulfills the following major objectives:

1. To rehabilitate endangered species under semi natural conditions.
2. To protect indigenous plants, birds and animals species.
3. To develop a gene pool of endangered wildlife species.
4. To raise the socio economic condition of the local people by promoting eco-tourism and providing job opportunities.
5. To create awareness amongst the local community especially the school students and general public.

== Birds and animals in the park ==
Pheasants

- Silver Pheasant (Lophura nycthemera)
- Golden Pheasant

Peacocks

- White spp
- Cameo spp
- Blue spp
- Indian Blue spp
- Black Shoulder spp
- Pied spp
- Purple neck spp

Cranes

- Common crane
- Demoiselle crane
- Black crowned crane
- Grey crowned crane

Ducks and geese

- Ruddy shelduck
- Bar-headed goose
- Gadwall
- Mallard duck
- Wigeon
- Northern shoveler
- Northern pintail

Flamingoes (Phoenicopterus)

Mammals

- Chinkara
- Blackbuck
- Urial (Ovis vignei)
- Hog deer
