= Indus Basin =

Part of Asia

The Indus Basin

The Indus Basin is the part of Asia drained by the Indus River and its tributaries. The basin covers an area of 1,120,000 km^{2} (430,000 sq mi) (Note: Other estimates put the area of the basin between 1,080,000 km^{2} (420,000 sq mi) and 1,137,817 km^{2} (439,314 sq mi)) traversing four countries: Afghanistan, China, India, and Pakistan, with most of the area lying predominantly in the latter two countries.

== Geography ==
The Indus River has two main tributaries: the Panjnad—formed by successive confluences of Sutlej, Beas, Ravi, Jhelum, and Chenab Rivers—and the Kabul, containing the waters of the Swat and Kunar Rivers, as well as others. The Indus and Sutlej originate on the Tibetan Plateau, the Ravi, Beas, Chenab and Jhelum originate in the Indian western Himalayas, and the Kabul and its tributaries originate in the Hindu Kush of eastern Afghanistan and northern Pakistan.

The Indus Basin lies in four countries: Pakistan, India, China, and Afghanistan. The largest portion of the basin, at 47%, lies in Pakistan while India contains the second biggest share at 39%. China and Afghanistan contain the remaining 14%. The Indus Basin spans the length of Pakistan, constitutes a majority (65%) of its area and forms part of all provinces and territories of the country: Punjab, Sindh, Khyber Pakhtunkhwa, Balochistan, Azad Jammu and Kashmir, and Gilgit-Baltistan, with all except Sindh and Balochistan located entirely within the basin. In India, the Indus Basin forms around 14% of the country but makes up the bulk of the northwestern part of the country including the states and union territories of Punjab, Himachal Pradesh, Jammu and Kashmir, Ladakh, Haryana, and western Rajasthan.

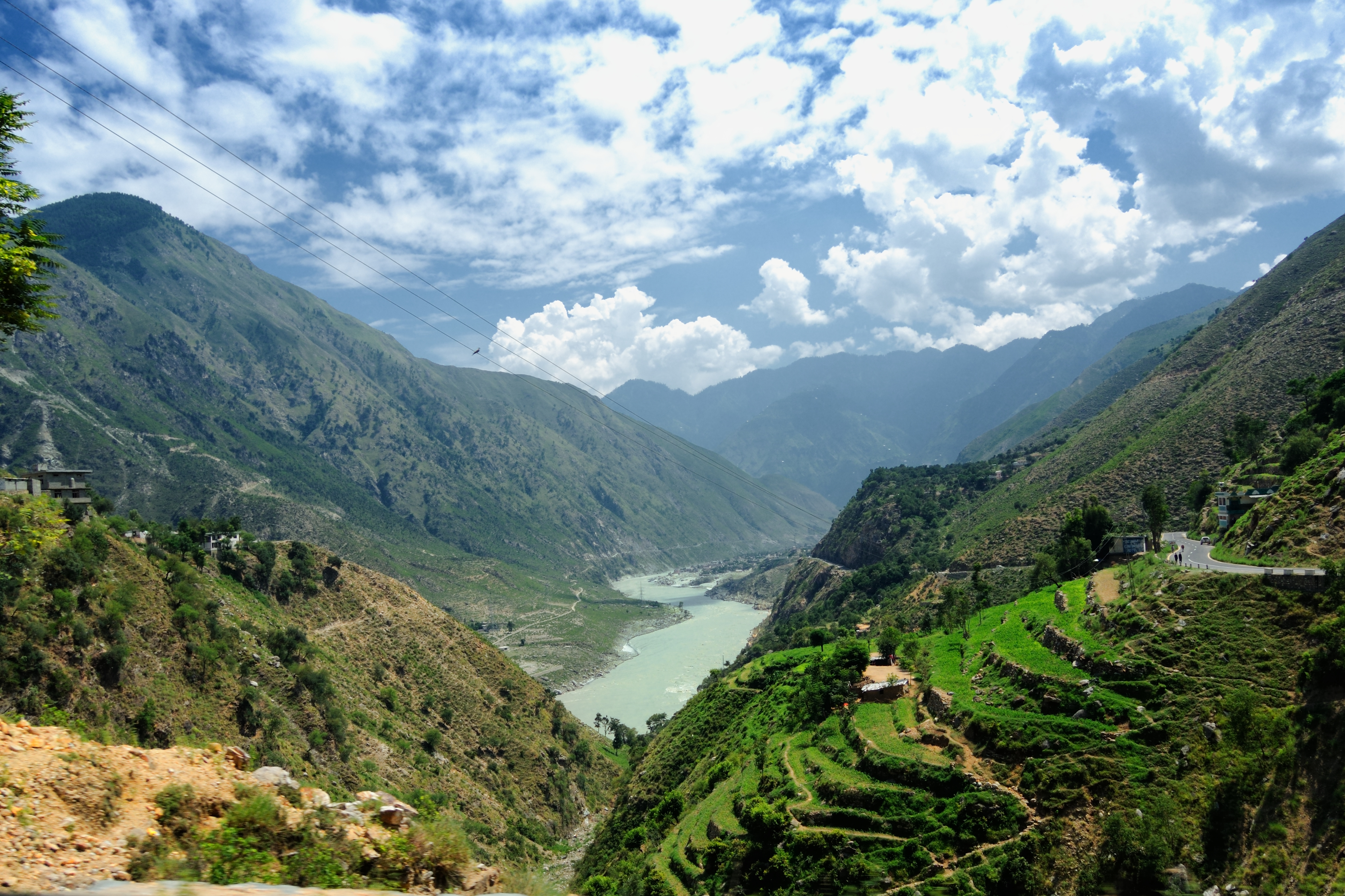
The Indus River in Khyber Pakhtunkhwa

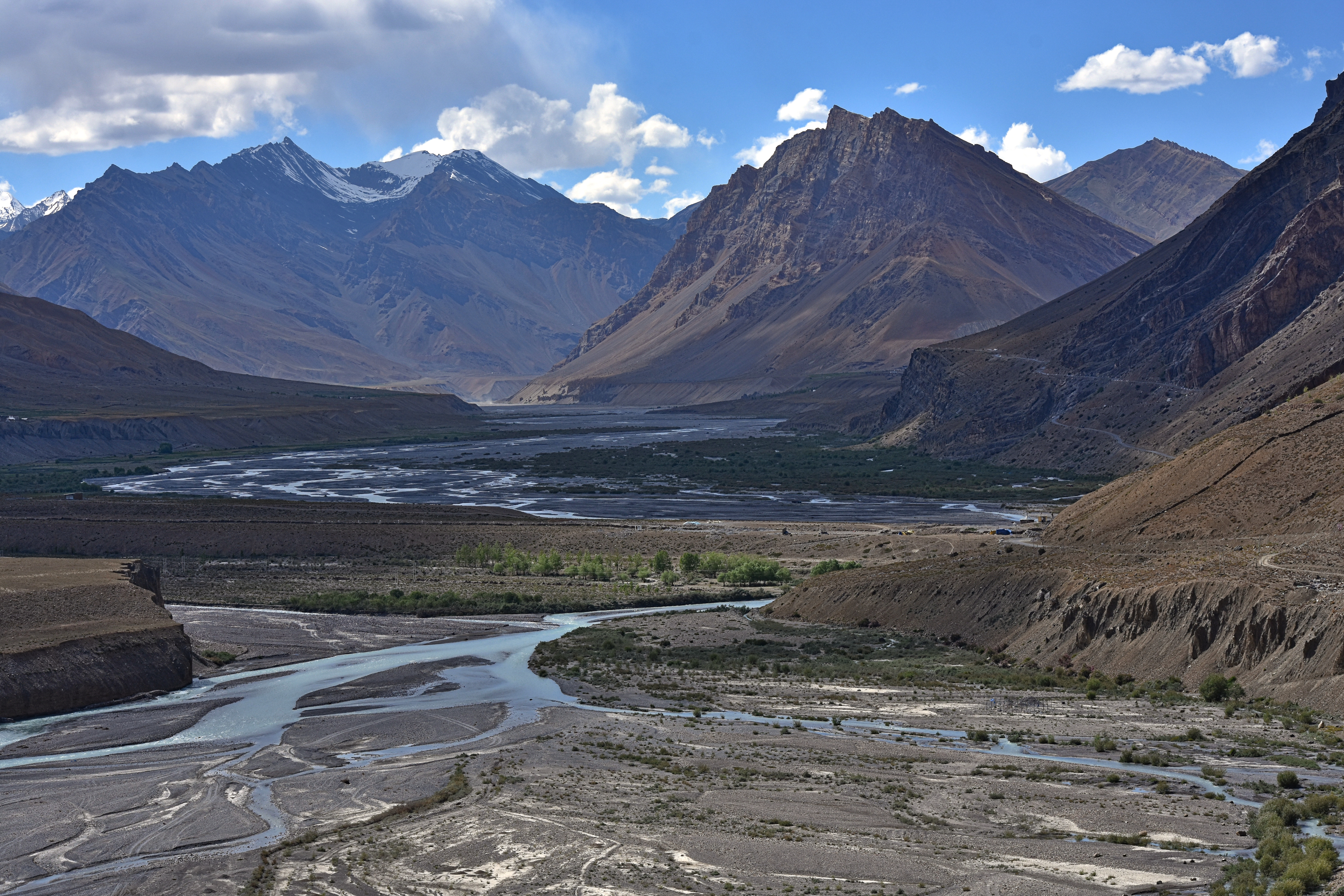
Spiti, a tributary of the Satluj, in Himachal Pradesh

The Indus Basin consists of various topographical regions. A large part of the drainage basin is mountainous, and around 40% of its area lies above an elevation of 2,000 m (6,600 ft). The basin can be divided into two wide physiographic divisions: the upper basin consisting of the mountainous regions of the Himalaya, Karakoram, Hindu Kush, Shiwalik, Suleiman, and Kirthar ranges; and the lower basin consisting of the Indus Plains including the alluvial plains of the Punjab and Sindh. Most of the basin is arid or semi-arid, with the exception of the Himalayan foothills which receive significant rainfall.

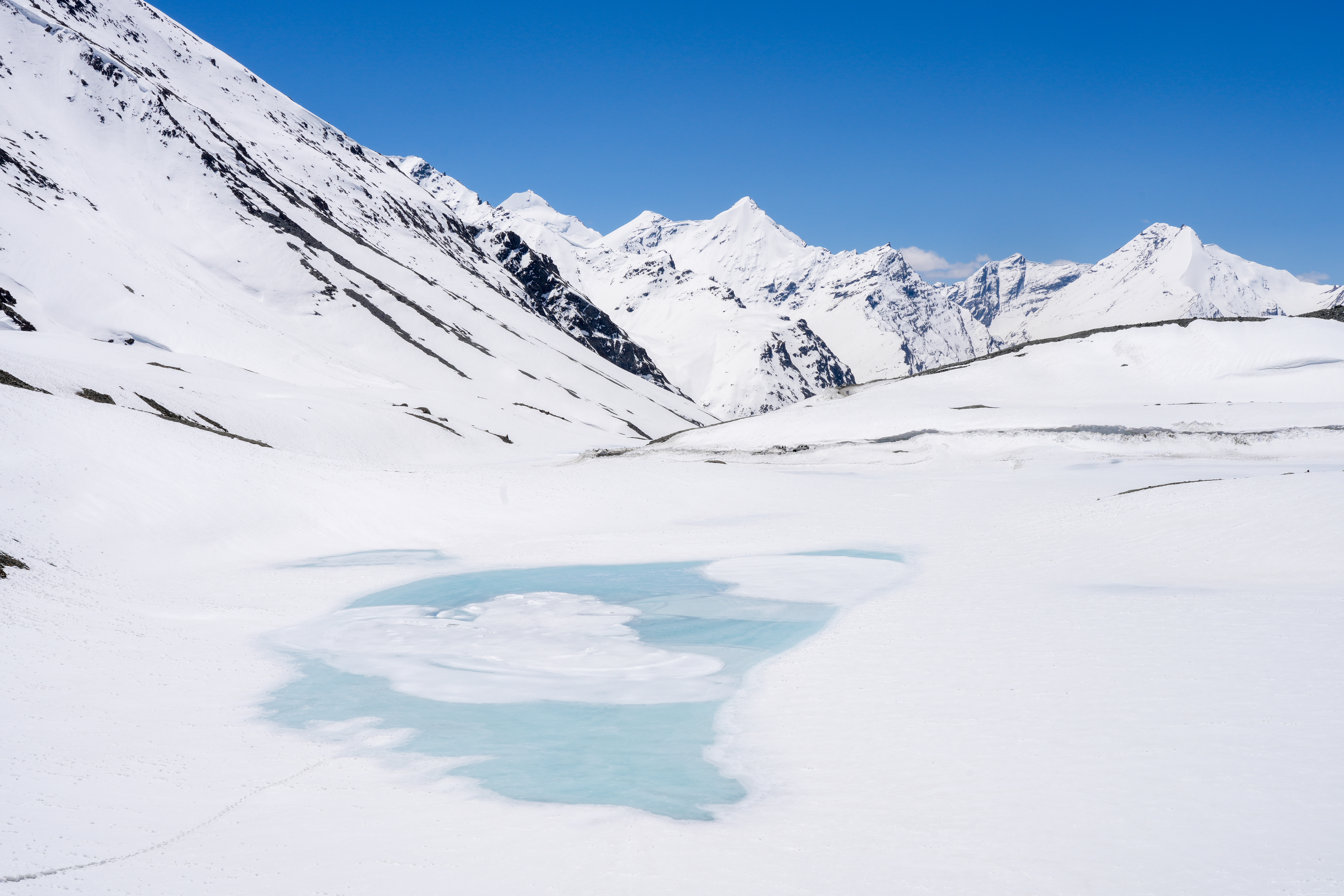
Frozen lake at Shinku La, a mountain pass in Himachal Pradesh, India. The headwaters of the Chenab and Zanskar rivers lie near the pass.

The basin contains the largest amount of perennial glacial ice outside of the polar regions. A majority of the runoff in the Indus drainage basin comes from meltwater—glacial melt contributing 41% and snowmelt providing 22%—of the Himalaya, Hindu Kush and Karakorum mountains. Rainfall contributes the remaining. On average, a little over half of the entire annual flow is received within the three months from July to September, when monsoonal rains combine with meltwater. As a result, the region has historically seen substantial flooding in the summer months.

== Water use ==
The Indus drainage supports some 237 million people. Pakistan contains a majority of the people living in the Indus Basin (around 61% of total) most of whom heavily depend on its rivers for their water needs. India contains another large portion (35%) of the Indus Basin's population. The remaining 4% live mostly in Afghanistan, representing a little less than a quarter of the country's population. The Indus Basin is the second most water stressed basin of the world.

93% of the water of the Indus Basin is used for irrigation of agricultural land. Many of the rivers of the Indus River system are dammed to create large reservoirs of water: in India the Satluj river is dammed at Bhakra creating the Gobind Sagar reservoir, the Beas at Pong creating the Maharana Pratap Sagar reservoir and the Ravi at Thein creating the Ranjit Sagar reservoir; while in Pakistan the Jhelum river is dammed at Mangla and the Indus is dammed at Tarbela and Chashma creating the Mangla, Tarbela and Chashma reservoirs respectively. The water from these reservoirs as well as from various barrages are diverted to irrigate 26 million hectares (mha) of agricultural land, 16 mha in Pakistan and 10 mha in India.

== See also ==
- Living Indus Initiative
- Indus Water Treaty

== Bibliography ==
- Gilmartin, David (2015), Blood and Water: The Indus River Basin in Modern History, University of California Press, doi:10.1525/california/9780520285293.001.0001, ISBN 978-0-520-96083-1, OCLC 987457337
- Khan, Sadiq I.; Adams III, Thomas E., eds. (2019), Indus River Basin: Water Security and Sustainability, Elsevier, doi:10.1016/C2016-0-04119-0, ISBN 978-0-12-812782-7, OCLC 8157422772
  - Cheema, MJM; Qamar, MU (2019), 8. Transboundary Indus River Basin: Potential Threats to Its Integrity, pp. 183–201, doi:10.1016/B978-0-12-812782-7.00009-6
  - Shrestha, Arun Bhakta; Wagle, Nisha; Rajbhandari, Rupak (2019), 6. A Review on the Projected Changes in Climate Over the Indus Basin, pp. 145–158, doi:10.1016/B978-0-12-812782-7.00007-2
- Laghari, A. I.; Vanham, D.; Rauch, W. (2012). "The Indus basin in the framework of current and future water resources management" (PDF). Hydrology and Earth System Sciences. 16 (4): 1063–83. Bibcode:2012HESS...16.1063L. doi:10.5194/hess-16-1063-2012.
- Shrestha, AB; Agrawal, NK; Alfthan, B; Bajracharya, SR; Maréchal, J; van Oort, B, eds. (2015). The Himalayan Climate and Water Atlas: Impact of Climate Change on Water Resources in Five of Asia's Major River Basins. ICIMOD, GRID-Arendal and CICERO. ISBN 978-92-9115-357-2.
- Richey AS, Thomas BF, Lo MH, Reager JT, Famiglietti JS, Voss K, Swenson S, Rodell M (July 2015). "Quantifying renewable groundwater stress with GRACE". Water Resour Res. 51 (7): 5217–38. Bibcode:2015WRR....51.5217R. doi:10.1002/2015WR017349. PMC 4744761. PMID 26900185.
