= Environmental issues in Pakistan =

Environmental issues in Pakistan include air pollution, water pollution, noise pollution, climate change, pesticide misuse, soil erosion, natural disasters, desertification and flooding. According to the 2020 edition of the environmental performance index (EPI) ranking released by Yale Center for Environmental Law & Policy, Pakistan ranks 142 with an EPI score of 33.1, an increase of 6.1 over a 10-year period. It ranked 180 in terms of air quality. The climatic changes and global warming are the most alarming issues risking millions of lives across the country. The major reasons of these environmental issues are carbon emissions, population explosion, and deforestation.

These are serious environmental problems that Pakistan is facing, and they are getting worse as the country's economy expands and the population grows. Although some NGOs and government departments have taken initiatives to stop environmental degradation, Pakistan's environmental issues still remain. Pakistan is facing a significant challenge as its natural resources and ecosystems encounter increasing pollution and strain. The foremost environmental concerns in the country revolve around the excessive use of limited natural resources, contamination of air and water, diminishing energy reserves, the reduction of forests, and the management of waste.

== Economic consequences of environmental degradation ==
The majority of Pakistan's industrial sectors, for example fishing and agriculture, which account for more than one-fourth of the output and two-fifths of employment in Pakistan, are highly dependent on the country's natural resources. Hence, in order to sustain economic growth there is a high demand on already scarce natural resources. However it is ironic that what the country depends on for its growth is also what threatens the future welfare and success of the country. According to the World Bank, 70% of Pakistan's population live in rural areas and are already stricken by high poverty levels. These people depend on natural resources to provide income and tend to overuse these resources. This leads to further degradation of the environment and subsequently increases poverty. This has led to what the World Bank refers to as a "vicious downward spiral of impoverishment and environmental degradation."

== Pollution ==
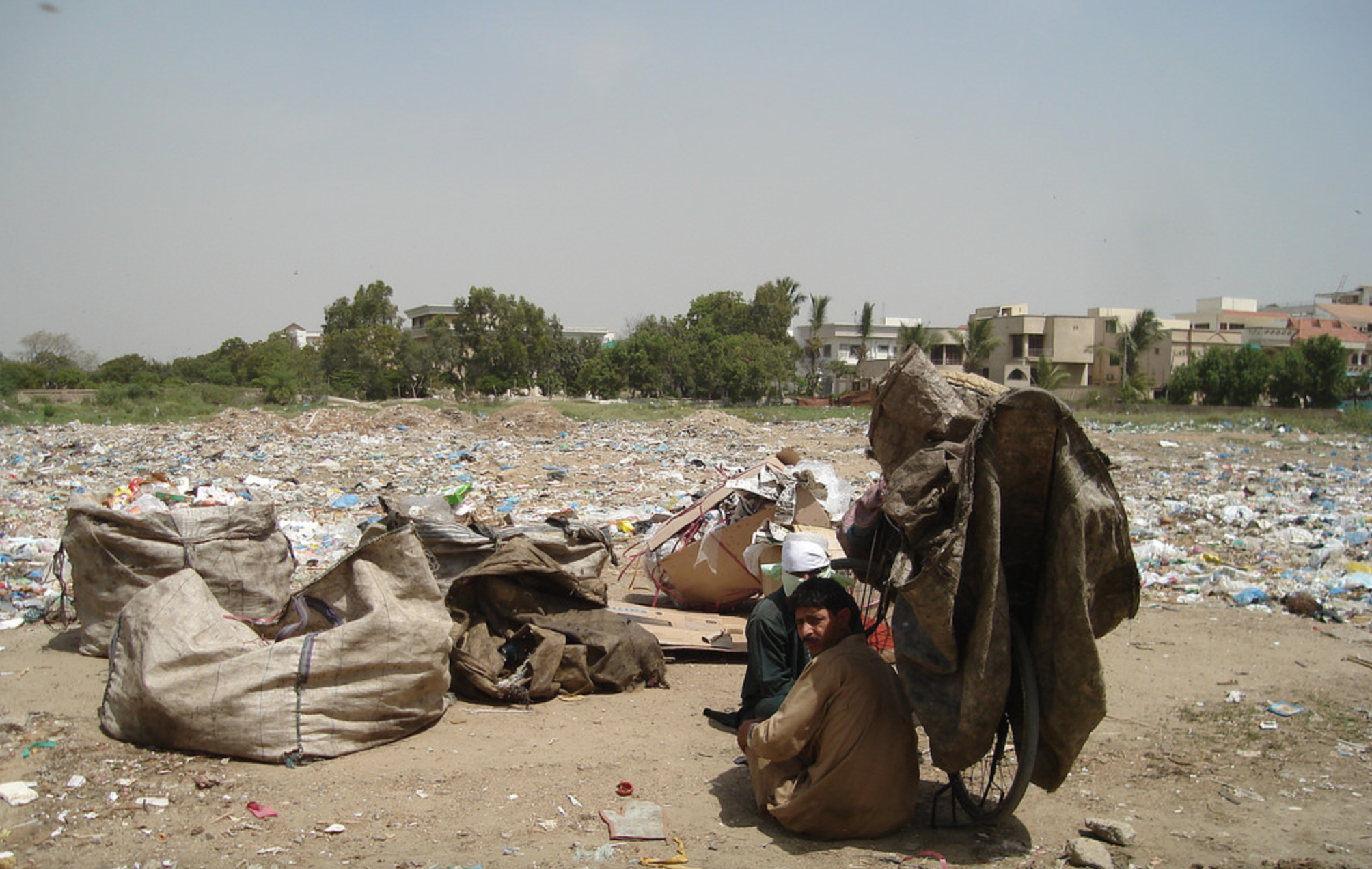
Trash thrown in an empty plot in Karachi, Pakistan.

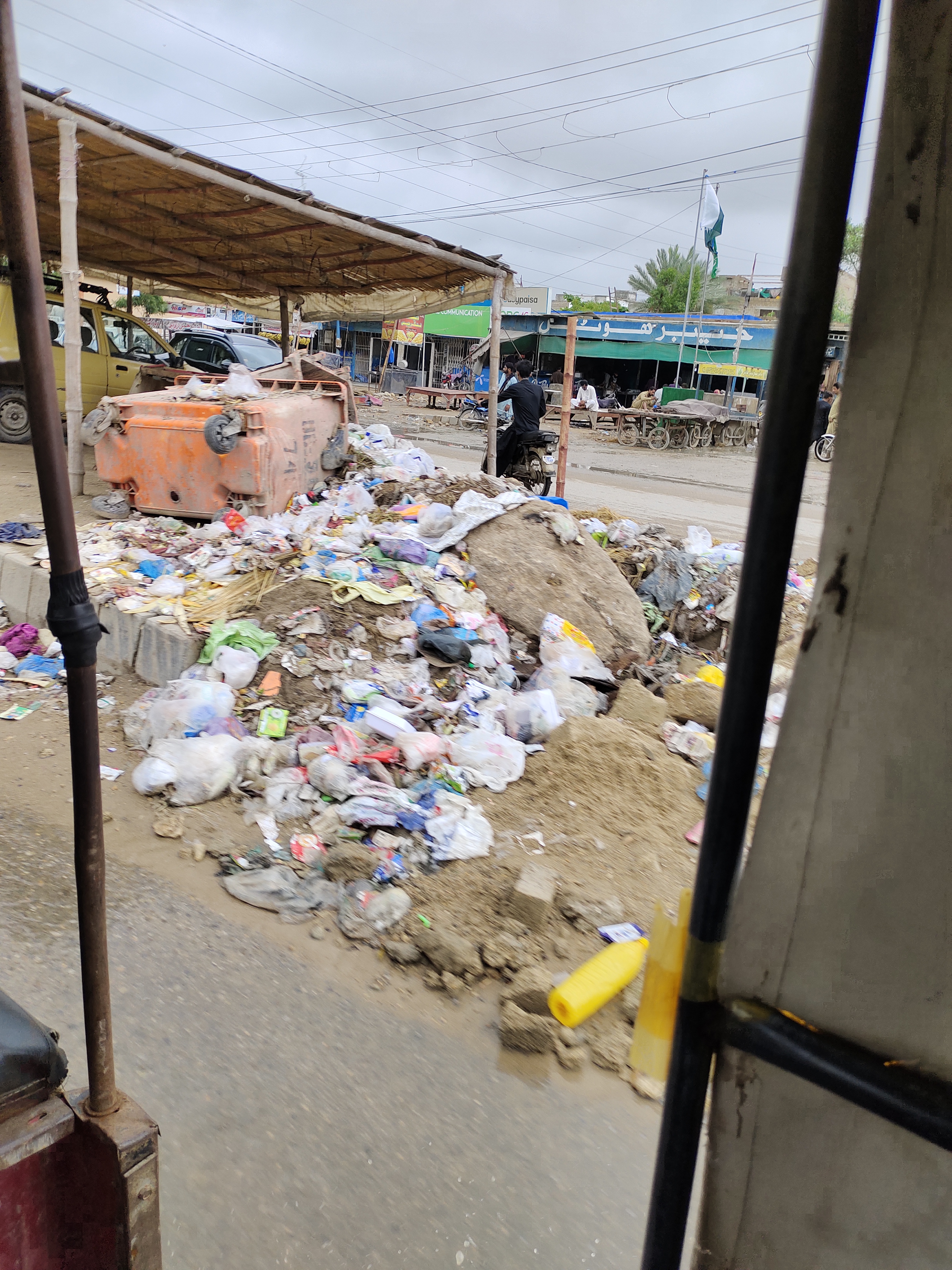
The picture shows trash lying in the centre of the street. The city has suffered significant harm due to poor administration. People leave trash on the highways, but the local authority never picks it up or even looks at it.

The World Bank report in 2013 stated that Pakistan's top environmental issues include air pollution, inadequate supply of uncontaminated drinking water, noise pollution and the health deterioration of urban and rural populations due to pollution. These environmental concerns not only harm Pakistani citizens but also pose a serious threat to the country's economy. The report also stated that the increase in industrialization, urbanization and motorization will inevitably worsen this problem. Pakistan holds the dubious distinction of being the world's third-most polluted country when it comes to air quality, compounding its environmental challenges. The swift pace of urbanization, coupled with population growth, presents further intricacies in this regard.

=== Water pollution ===
Pakistan is classified as a water stressed nation by the World Bank. There are seven main rivers that enter Pakistan from upper riparian states, including the Kabul River that enters from Afghanistan, and the Indus River, Jhelum River, Chenab River, Ravi River, and Sutlej River that enter from India. Among these, the Ravi and Sutlej are diverted in upstream India, for which consumptive use was awarded to India under the Indus Waters Treaty signed in 1960 by India and Pakistan. Canal networks from the Indus (main stem), Jhelum River, and Chenab River supply water throughout the agricultural plains in Punjab and in Sindh, while the rest of the country has very little access to other fresh water. Potential scarcity of water not only threatens Pakistan's economy but also poses a serious threat to the lives of millions of Pakistanis.

Lower flows due to the Indus Waters Treaty, as well as diversion to canals, means that lower dilution flows are available within the rivers of Pakistan. On the other hand, water pollution generation is increasing largely due to the growing economy and population, and an almost complete lack of water treatment. The sources for water pollution include the overuse of chemical fertilizers and pesticides, the dumping of industrial effluent into lakes and rivers, untreated sewage being dumped into rivers and the ocean, and contaminated pipelines being used to transport water. The contamination of fresh drinking water makes it harder for people to find clean water supplies and increases the prevalence of waterborne diseases. Consequently, most of the reported health problems in Pakistan are either a direct or indirect result of polluted water. 45% of infant deaths are due to diarrhea and 60% to overall waterborne diseases.

According to researchers, Pakistan is projected to become the most water-stressed country in the region by the year 2040.

=== Noise pollution ===
The megacities of Pakistan, such as Karachi, Lahore, Islamabad and Rawalpindi, face the issue of noise pollution. The main source of this pollution is the traffic noise caused by buses, cars, trucks, rickshaws and water tankers. A study showed that on one of Karachi's main roads, the average noise level was around 90 dB and was capable of reaching about 110 dB. This is much higher than the ISO's noise level standard of 70 dB, which is not meant to be harmful to the human ear. However, the study also concluded that in Pakistan, "the traffic noise levels limit as laid down by National Environment Quality standards, Environmental Protection Agency is 85 dB".

This high level of noise pollution can cause auditory and non-auditory health issues. Auditory issues include the loss of auditory sensory cells; non-auditory health issues include sleep disturbance, noise and cardiovascular disease, endocrine response to noise and psychiatric disorder. There are very few, vague laws and policies in regards to noise levels. There is no accountability, and while the federal and provincial environmental protection agencies receive dozens of complaints on noise pollution from the public, these agencies are unable to take action due to legal constraints and the absence of national noise level standards.

=== Air pollution ===
Air pollution is a growing environmental problem in most major cities of Pakistan. According to a World Bank report, "Karachi's urban air pollution is among the most severe in the world and it engenders significant damages to human health and the economy". The inefficient use of energy, an increase in the number of vehicles used daily, an increase in unregulated industrial emissions and the burning of garbage and plastic have contributed the most to air pollution in urban areas. According to a recent study, the Sindh Environment Protection Department claims that the average level of pollution in big cities is approximately four times higher than the World Health Organisation's limits. These emissions have detrimental effects, including "respiratory diseases, reduced visibility, loss of vegetation and an effect on the growth of plants".

One of the greatest contributors to air pollution is industrial activity. The inadequate air emission treatments and lack of regulatory control over industrial activity has contributed to the deterioration of ambient air quality in major cities. In addition, the common practice of burning massive amounts of solid waste, including plastic and rubber, on street corners by the public, releases toxic gases, which are extremely harmful for residents in the area.

In 2018, a young entrepreneur in Karachi, Abid Omar, launched the Pakistan Air Quality Initiative to monitor air quality in Pakistan's big cities. The project aims to increase the availability of air quality data in Pakistan and make citizens more aware of the health impacts of air pollution. The US State Department has set up three high-quality air quality monitoring stations at three locations in Pakistan.

Specifically, studies have revealed the negative consequences air pollution can have on the welfare of those impacted. Studies have revealed how the constant fluctuation of particulate matter poses a major threat to Pakistan's citizens who are frequently exposes to harmful levels of air pollution. Suspended Particulate Matter, which has been linked to respiratory illnesses has been found in harmful quantities in Pakistan's major urban areas. Some strategies that can be used to effectively manage Pakistan's urban air pollution problems include the advancements to road design and improvement of transport sustainability, increased use of abatement policy by the Pakistani government, and a conversion to clean fuel energy alternatives like CNG.

== Climate change ==
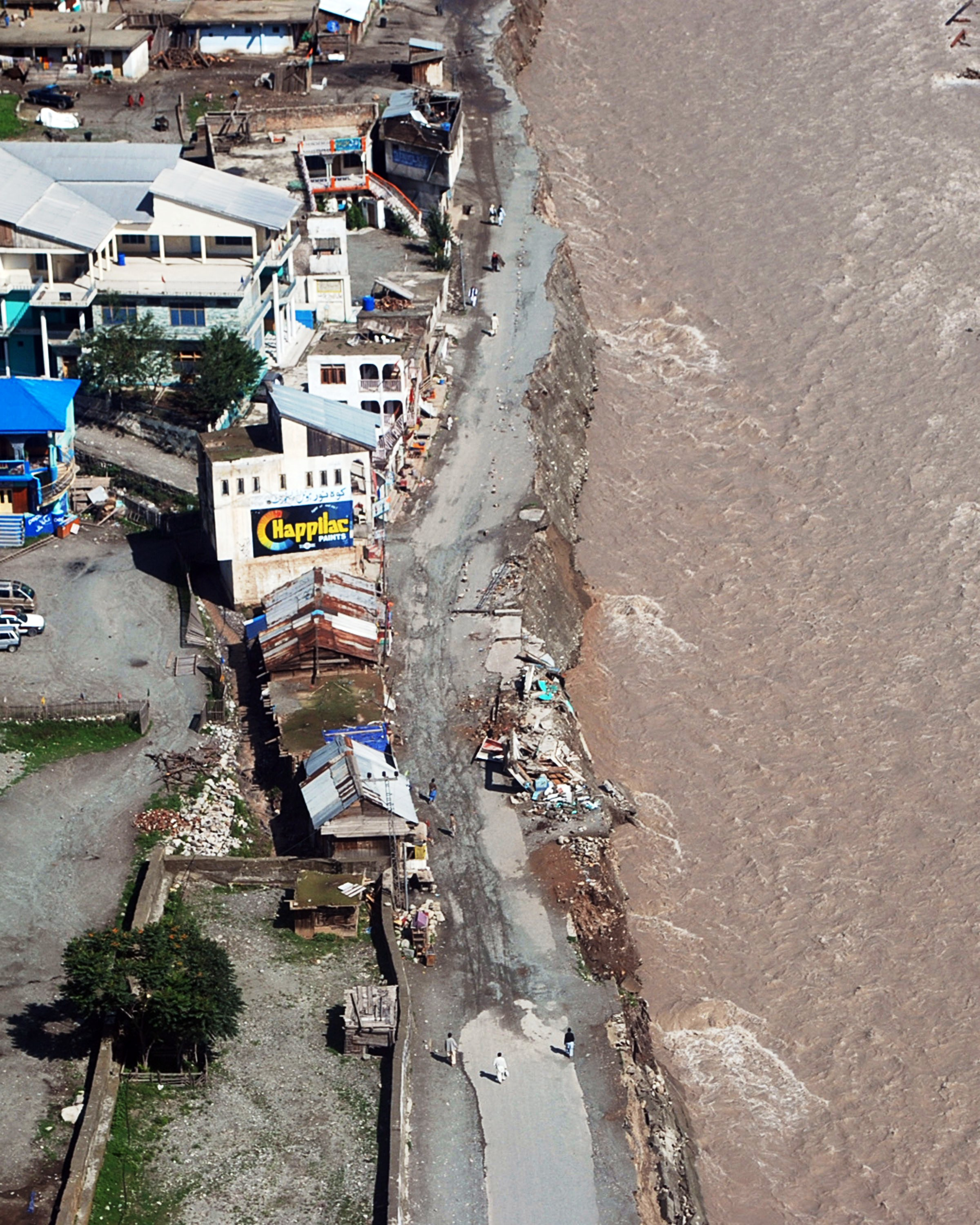
Climate change may have been a contributing factor to the severity of the 2010 Pakistan floods.

Climate change in Pakistan is a major issue for the country. Pakistan is highly vulnerable to climate change. As with the changing climate in South Asia as a whole, the climate of Pakistan has changed over the past several decades, with significant impacts on the environment and people. In addition to increased heat, drought and extreme weather in parts of the country, the melting of glaciers in the Himalayas has impacted some of the important rivers of Pakistan. Between 1999 and 2018, Pakistan ranked 5th in the countries affected by extreme weather events caused by climate change.

As Pakistan's largest province, Punjab has demonstrated its commitment to addressing climate change challenges through initiatives such as the Climate Change Activity Plan and the Punjab Climate Change Strategy.

Pakistan is prone to a range of natural disasters, including cyclones, floods, drought, intense rainfall, and earthquakes. According to scientific research, climate change played a substantial role in the devastating 2022 floods, which directly affected over 30 million people in Pakistan, causing loss of life, damage to public infrastructure, and widespread displacement. Climate change poses a significant menace to Pakistan's economy and security.

== Natural disasters ==
Due to Pakistan's diverse land and climatic conditions, it is prone to different forms of natural disasters, including earthquakes, floods, tsunamis, droughts, cyclones and hurricanes. A disaster management report claims that the provinces of Gilgit-Baltistan (GB), Balochistan and AJK are vulnerable seismic regions and hence highly susceptible to earthquakes, while Sindh and Punjab constantly suffer from floods because they are low-lying areas.

Some of the worst natural disasters that Pakistan has faced include the 1935 Quetta earthquake when around 60,000 people were killed, the 1950 floods when an estimated 2900 people died and 900,000 people were left homeless, the 1974 Hunza earthquake where around 5300 people were killed, the 2005 Kashmir earthquake that killed at least 73,000 and affected more than 1.5 million people, and the 2010 floods, where 20 million people were affected.

== Forests ==
Pakistan had a 2018 Forest Landscape Integrity Index mean score of 7.42/10, ranking it 41st globally out of 172 countries. Yet, deforestation is happening at an alarming rate in Pakistan. The country currently relies heavily on imported wood-based products due to a lack of self-sufficiency in this sector, resulting in substantial resource expenditure. Furthermore, these resources are depleting at a rate of one percent, which is having a significant impact on the well-being of the Pakistani population.

=== Tree cover extent and loss ===
Global Forest Watch publishes annual estimates of tree cover loss and 2000 tree cover extent derived from time-series analysis of Landsat satellite imagery in the Global Forest Change dataset. In this framework, tree cover refers to vegetation taller than 5 m (including natural forests and tree plantations), and tree cover loss is defined as the complete removal of tree cover canopy for a given year, regardless of cause.

For Pakistan, country statistics report cumulative tree cover loss of 9,531 ha (95.31 km^{2}) from 2001 to 2024 (about 1.4% of its 2000 tree cover area). For tree cover density greater than 30%, country statistics report a 2000 tree cover extent of 681,137 ha (6,811.37 km^{2}). The charts and table below display this data. In simple terms, the annual loss number is the area where tree cover disappeared in that year, and the extent number shows what remains of the 2000 tree cover baseline after subtracting cumulative loss. Forest regrowth is not included in the dataset.

Annual tree cover loss in Pakistan, 2001–2024. View chart definition.
Tree cover extent in 2000 minus cumulative tree cover loss in Pakistan, 2001–2024 (loss-only residual; does not account for gain). View chart definition.

Annual tree cover extent and loss
Year	Tree cover extent (km2) (Note: This residual measure does not include forest regrowth.)	Annual tree cover loss (km2)
2001	6,809.46	1.91
2002	6,806.36	3.10
2003	6,800.44	5.92
2004	6,789.56	10.88
2005	6,780.45	9.11
2006	6,767.83	12.62
2007	6,756.99	10.84
2008	6,747.04	9.95
2009	6,738.25	8.79
2010	6,731.35	6.90
2011	6,726.87	4.48
2012	6,724.64	2.23
2013	6,724.06	0.58
2014	6,723.72	0.34
2015	6,723.70	0.02
2016	6,723.70	0.00
2017	6,721.84	1.86
2018	6,721.10	0.74
2019	6,720.31	0.79
2020	6,719.64	0.67
2021	6,719.07	0.57
2022	6,718.62	0.45
2023	6,717.20	1.42
2024	6,716.06	1.14

=== REDD+ reference level and monitoring ===
Under the UNFCCC REDD+ framework, Pakistan has submitted a national forest reference emission level (FREL). On the UNFCCC REDD+ Web Platform, Pakistan's 2020 submission is listed as having an assessed reference level and a reported national strategy, while safeguards information and a national forest monitoring system are listed as "not reported".

The first assessed FREL, technically assessed in 2021, covered the REDD+ activity "reducing emissions from deforestation" at national scale. Using a 2004-2012 historical reference period, the technical assessment reported that Pakistan's original submission proposed a FREL of 1 million t CO2 eq per year, which was revised during the assessment process to an assessed FREL of 946,653 t CO2 eq per year. The technical assessment states that the benchmark represents the annual average of CO2 emissions from gross deforestation, defined as the conversion of natural forest to other land uses, and excludes subsequent emissions and removals from deforested areas.

The technical assessment also reports that the FREL included above-ground biomass and below-ground biomass, while excluding deadwood, litter and soil organic carbon, and that it used a forest definition of land of at least 0.5 hectares with tree crown cover of more than 10 percent and trees capable of reaching at least 2 metres in height. Although that forest definition includes irrigated plantations, the FREL estimates were based only on changes in natural forests. Activity data were derived from Landsat time-series mapping for 2004, 2008, 2012 and 2016, checked against very-high-resolution imagery and Collect Earth plots, while emission factors were derived from a pilot national forest inventory and provincial carbon stock inventories.

== Conservation efforts ==
The government has expressed concern about environmental threats to economic growth and social development and since the early 1990s has addressed environmental concerns with new legislation and institutions such as the Pakistan Environment Protection Council. However, foreign lenders provide most environmental protection funds, and only 0.04 percent of the government's development budget goes to environmental protection. Thus, the government's ability to enforce environmental regulations is limited, and private industries often lack the funds to meet environmental standards established by international trade organizations. Government of Pakistan start new campaign with Clean and Green Pakistan to overcome environmental issues.

=== Living Indus Initiative ===
The Living Indus Initiative is an environmental program launched by the Ministry of Climate Change in Pakistan, in collaboration with the United Nations, intended to protect, conserve, and restore the natural ecosystems within the Indus Basin.

=== Clean Green Champion Program ===
An initiative named Clean Green Pakistan was launched in 2019 by the Government of Pakistan. The idea of the initiative was to hold a competition between cities of Pakistan in cleanliness and greenery. A web portal was launched where citizens can get registered and report their activities to earn points. Citizens would also be awarded medals when they reach a certain threshold of points.

=== Billion Tree Tsunami ===
The Billion Tree Tsunami was launched in 2014 by the government of Khyber Pakhtunkhwa (KPK) as a response against the challenge of global warming. Pakistan's Billion Tree Tsunami restores 350,000 hectares of forests and degraded land to surpass its Bonn Challenge commitment. The project aimed at improving the ecosystems of classified forests, as well as privately owned waste and farm lands, and therefore entails working in close collaboration with concerned communities and stakeholders to ensure their meaningful participation through effectuating project promotion and extension services. In just a year it has added three-quarters of a billion new trees, as part of a “tree tsunami” aimed at reversing worsening forest loss. The project was completed in August 2017, ahead of schedule.

The initiative was acknowledged by international media, namely The Washington Post, VoA News, The Hindu, Reuters, Al Jazeera, and many others. Short films such as Green Election Campaign and Stop are a part of Clean Green Pakistan Effort.

=== National Conservation Strategy ===
The Conservation Strategy Report has three explicit objectives: conservation of natural resources, promotion of sustainable development, and improvement of efficiency in the use and management of resources. It sees itself as a "call for action" addressed to central and provincial governments, businesses, non-governmental organizations (NGOs), local communities, and individuals.

The primary agricultural nonpoint source pollutants are nutrients (particularly nitrogen and phosphorus), sediment, animal wastes, pesticides, and salts. Agricultural nonpoint sources enter surface water through direct surface runoff or through seepage to ground water that discharges to a surface water outlet. Various farming activities result in the erosion of soil particles. The sediment produced by erosion can damage fish habitat and wetlands, and often transports excess agricultural chemicals resulting in contaminated runoff. This runoff, in turn, affects changes to aquatic habitat such as temperature increases and decreased oxygen. The most common sources of excess nutrients in surface water from nonpoint sources are chemical fertilizers and manure from animal facilities. Such nutrients cause eutrophication in surface water. Pesticides used for pest control in agricultural operations can also contaminate surface as well as ground-water resources. Return flows, runoff, and leach ate from irrigated lands may transport sediment, nutrients, salts, and other materials. Finally, improper grazing practices in riparian areas, as well as upland areas, can also cause water quality degradation. The development of Pakistan is viewed as a multigenerational enterprise.

In seeking to transform attitudes and practices, the National Conservation Strategy recognizes that two key changes in values are needed: the restoration of the conservation ethic derived from Islamic moral values, called Qantas, and the revival of community spirit and responsibility, Haqooq ul Ibad.

The National Conservation Strategy Report recommends fourteen program areas for priority implementation: maintaining soils in croplands, increasing efficiency of irrigation, protecting watersheds, supporting forestry and plantations, restoring rangelands and improving livestock, protecting water bodies and sustaining fisheries, conserving biodiversity, increasing energy efficiency, developing and deploying renewable resources, preventing or decreasing pollution, managing urban wastes, supporting institutions to manage common resources, integrating population and environmental programs, and preserving the cultural heritage. It identifies sixty-eight specific programs in these areas, each with a long-term goal and expected outputs and physical investments required within ten years. Special attention has been paid to the potential roles of environmental NGOs, women's organizations, and international NGOs in working with the government in its conservation efforts. Recommendations from the National Conservation Strategy Report are incorporated in the Eighth Five-Year Plan (1993–98).

In a recent study conducted by the Global CLEAN campaign, it was found that the average temperature in Pakistan had risen by 0.2 degrees in only two years. This is a dramatic change and puts emphasis on climate change campaigns.

Land use

- Arable land - 27%
- Permanent crops - 1%
- Permanent pastures - 6%
- Forests and woodland - 5%
- Other - 61% (1993 est.)
- Irrigated land - 171,100 km^{2} (1993 est.)

=== Protected areas ===
Pakistan has 14 national parks, 72 wildlife sanctuaries, 66 game reserves, 9 marine and littoral protected areas, 19 protected wetlands and a number of other protected grasslands, shrublands, woodlands and natural monuments.

==== International agreements ====
Pakistan is a party to several international agreements related to environment and climate. The most prominent among them are:

Treaties and agreements
Specific regions and seas	Law of the Sea, Ship Pollution (MARPOL 73/78)
Atmosphere and climate	Climate Change, Ozone Layer Protection, Nuclear Test Ban
Biodiversity, environment, and forests	Desertification, Endangered Species, Environmental Modification, Wetlands, Marine Life Conservation
Wastes	Hazardous Wastes
Rivers	Indus Waters Treaty

== See also ==
- Green economy
- Geography of Pakistan
- Health care in Pakistan
- Hydrogen economy
- Leapfrogging from natural gas to hydrogen
- List of environmental issues
- Pakistan Environmental Protection Agency
- Protected areas of Pakistan
- Wildlife of Pakistan
