= Lajbook =

Lajbook Lajbouk
- Union Council
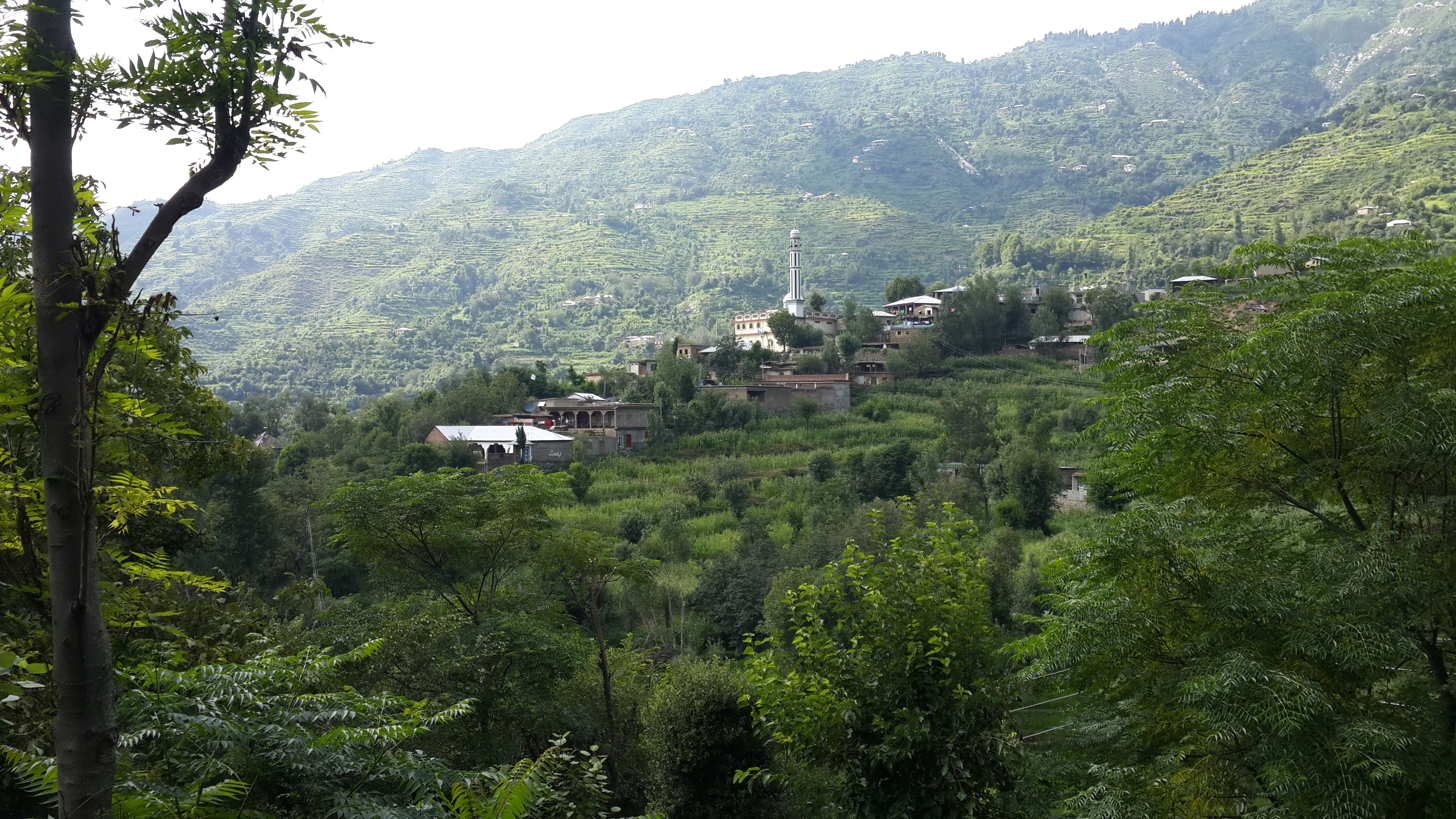

- Location within Khyber Pakhtunkhwa Location within Pakistan
- Coordinates: 34°57′34″N 71°54′5″E
- Country: Pakistan
- Province: Khyber Pakhtunkhwa
- District: Lower Dir
- Tehsil: Balambat
- Time zone: UTC+5 (PST)

Lajbook (also spelled Lajbouk) is a village and union council of the Lower Dir District in the Khyber Pakhtunkhwa province of Pakistan.
