= Darwin Initiative =

The Darwin Initiative is a UK Government funding program that aims to assist countries with rich biodiversity but poor financial resources to meet their objectives under the Convention on Biological Diversity (CBD), the Convention on International Trade in Endangered Species of Wild Fauna and Flora (CITES), and the Convention on the Conservation of Migratory Species of Wild Animals (CMS).

== Establishment ==
The Darwin Initiative was announced by the UK Government in 1992 at the Earth Summit in Rio de Janeiro. It was established as a non-departmental public body of DETR, moving to DEFRA on its formation in 2001.

In 2010 DEFRA provided annual funding of £7 Million. This will be increased during the period to 2014.

== Darwin Advisory Committee ==
The Darwin Initiative is managed by the Darwin Advisory Committee (DAC), and currently chaired by Professor David Macdonald. The first chairman was Sir Crispin Tickell who was succeeded by Professor David S. Ingram in 1999. Ingram held the post until handing over to Macdonald in 2005.

The DAC comprises experts from government, academic, science and the private sector.

The DAC's Terms of Reference state its purpose to be

"To advise the Secretary of State for the Environment on the principles and objectives of the Darwin Initiative for the Survival of Species grant programme in implementing the Convention on Biological Diversity especially Article 5, taking into account the past experience of the grant programme."

The DAC therefore advises Ministers on development of the Initiative and makes recommendations on applications for funding. The DAC is supported by a small secretariat team provided by DEFRA.

Under the 2010 UK quango reforms, the Darwin Advisory Council will be reconstituted as a committee of experts effective by March 2011.

== Projects funded ==
Supported projects include some based in the UK, UK Overseas Territories and over 100 countries worldwide. In December 2010, the Darwin Initiative had invested a total of £79,652,500 in 728 projects in 156 countries since 1992.
