= Withdrawal of United States troops =

Withdrawal of United States troops may refer to:

- Withdrawal of United States troops from Afghanistan
- Withdrawal of United States troops from Iraq
