= Operation Azm-e-Istehkam =

Pakistani counterterrorism operation

- Part of the insurgency in Khyber Pakhtunkhwa, the insurgency in Balochistan, counter-terrorism in Pakistan and the war on terror
Date	22 June 2024 – present (2 years, 4 months, 4 weeks and 1 day)
Location	Pakistan
Result	Ongoing: Operation Sarbakaf launched on 29 July 2025 in Bajaur; Pakistan rises to 1st in Global Terrorism Index Ranking

Belligerents
Pakistan	Islamist-Jihadist groups Baloch Nationalist-Separatist groups Pro-Islamic State groups

Commanders and leaders
Shehbaz Sharif; Asif Ali Zardari; Asim Munir	Noor Wali Mehsud Bashir Zeb; Nazar Baloch Shahab al-Muhajir

Units involved
Pakistan Armed Forces; Pakistan Army; Pakistan Air Force; Pakistan Navy; Civil Armed Forces; Frontier Corps; Pakistan Rangers; Pakistan Coast Guards; Federal Constabulary; (on border) Pakistan Police Service; Counter Terrorism Department; Pakistan Levies; Pakistani Intelligence community; NACTA; ISI; IB; MI; FIA; FMU; SB	Islamist-Jihadist groups: Tehrik-i-Taliban Pakistan; Al-Qaeda; AQIS; Former: Haqqani network Turkestan Islamic Party; Lashkar-e-Jhangvi: Baloch Nationalist-Separatist groups: Baloch Liberation Army; Baloch Liberation Front; Islamic State; Islamic State – Khorasan Province; Islamic State – Pakistan Province

Strength
Unknown	Unknown

Casualties and losses
2024: 754 S.P killed; 2025: 1,229 S.P killed; 2026: 1,183 S.P Killed	2024: 896 militants killed; 2025: 2,116 militants killed; 2026: 3,072 militants killed
- 2,019 civilian deaths

Operation Azm-e-Istehkam (Urdu: آپریشن عزم استحکام) is a counter-insurgency operation launched by the government of Pakistan in June 2024. The operation was approved by prime minister Shehbaz Sharif, and planned to include not only military action, but also socio-economic uplifting efforts to deter extremism.

== Etymology ==
Azm-e-Istehkam translates to "Resolve for Stability". Azm (عزم) means "resolve", while Istehkam (استحکام) means "stability" in Urdu. The phrase Azm-e-Istehkam has been chosen by the government to emphasise onto the non-kinetic parameters of the operation aimed at socio-economic upliftment to counter extremism.

== Background ==
Pakistan has been facing a looming Islamist insurgency in North-Western parts of the country since 2001 that came to haunt Pakistani state in an aftermath of 9/11 attacks. The al-Qaeda terrorists fled Afghanistan seek refuge in the bordering Federally Administered Tribal Areas of Pakistan. The insurgency blew up in 2004 when tensions rooted in the Pakistan Army's search for al-Qaeda fighters in Pakistan's mountainous Waziristan area escalated into armed resistance. Pakistan's actions were presented as its contribution to the U.S. war on terror.

The situation in erstwhile FATA further complicated with the emergence of Tehreek-Taliban Pakistan (TTP). Local Pakistani jihadi fighters that had previously fought Soviets, with support from Central Asian militant groups along with Arab fighters of al-Qaeda, in 2007 formed TTP.

The TTP emerged as one of the most lethal groups with the goal to overthrow Government of Pakistan in Islamabad and replace it with a Taliban-style government.

=== History of Pakistan's previous military campaigns ===
Responding to the threat posed by the Islamists, Pakistan Army under command of General Kayani's tenure started to turn the tide in its war against terrorism. In order to contain the militants General Kayani launched series of military campaigns to recapture areas fallen in the hands of militants from 2007 to 2013 beginning with Operation Rah-e-Haq. The campaign that launched by Kayani ended with success of Operation Zarb-e-Azb in late 2016. Pakistan Army under the Kayani Doctrine was able to capture six tribal agencies and four settled districts of Khyber-Pakhtunkhwa including Swat and South Waziristan, which were two strongholds of TTP.

The last operation Zarb-e-Azb was conducted by the Kayani's successor General Raheel Sharif to purge last remaining agency of North Waziristan from the clutches of TTP. Thus, Pakistan Armed Forces successfully recaptured seven tribal agencies of FATA and four districts of Khyber-Pakhtunkhwa by conducting a bloody armed campaign from 2007 to 2016.

Military campaign by Pakistan Armed forces since 2002
#	Campaign	Date	Location	Result1
	Operation al-Mizan	2002-2006	North Waziristan	Stalemate between Islamic militants and Government of Pakistan: Waziristan Accord between militants and Pakistan Army; Withdrawal of Pakistani forces from Waziristan; Waziristan fell out of writ of control Government of Pakistan for 12 years since 2002 till Operation Zarb-e-Azb in 2014.
	Operation Rah-e-Haq	25 October 2007– 8 December 2007	Swat Valley and Shangla	Pakistani victory: Led to the short-lived 2009 ceasefire; Sharia implemented in Swat; Ceasefire ended in the decisive Second Battle of Swat.
	Operation Zalzala	January 2008-May 2008	Spinkai, South Waziristan	Pakistani victory: Following the operation, the Tehrik-i-Taliban Pakistan (TTP) offered a truce and peace negotiations resulting in a suspension of violence.; In spite of the victory in the operation, on 21 May 2008 Pakistan signed a peace agreement with the Tehrik-i-Taliban Pakistan (TTP).; Short-lived peace in South Waziristan.
	Operation Sirat-e-Mustaqeem	28 June 2008 – 9 July 2008	Bara	Pakistani victory: Pakistan Army gained control of strategic town of Bara on the outskirts of Peshawar.; The Peshawar was secured from the threat of militant takeover.; Destruction of LeI command and training centers.
	Operation Sherdil	7 August 2008 – 28 February 2009	Bajaur Agency	Pakistani victory: Bajaur fell back under Government control; Militant fled across border into Kunar Afghanistan; Enduring peace in Bajaur
	Operation Black Thunderstorm	26 April 2009 – 14 June 2009	Swat; Buner; Lower Dir; Shangla	Pakistani victory: Districts returned to Pakistani control; High ranking TTP leadership taken as POW; TTP's control confined to four agencies of FATA, namely, North Waziristan, Kurram, Khyber and Orakzai.; Mainland Khyber-Pakhtunkhwa secured.; Enduring peace across Malakand division.
	Operation Rah-e-Rast	16 May 2009 – 15 July 2009	Swat	Decisive Pakistani victory: Sub-Operation of Black Thunderstorm specifically targeted to flush out militants from Swat; Swat returned to government control; Multiple Tehrik-i-Taliban Pakistan commanders captured or killed; Ensured long term peace in Swat
	Operation Rah-e-Nijat	19 June 2009 – 12 December 2009	South Waziristan Agency	Pakistani victory: The military occupied the town of Kaniguram, a stronghold of former Russians fighters and Uzbeks led by the Islamic Movement of Uzbekistan.; Senior Taliban, Uzbek, Russian, and Al-Qaeda leadership abandoned their posts and escaped to neighbouring Afghanistan; On December 12, 2009, the military took the control of the entire South Waziristan into the government control.; Pakistani forces established government writ in South Waziristan till Afghanistan-Pakistan border.; Enduring Peace in South Waziristan
	2009 Khyber Pass Offensive	1 September 2009 – 30 September 2009	Khyber Agency	Pakistani victory: NATO supply lines across Torkham border secured; Trade route between Afghanistan-Pakistan secured on National Highway 5.
	Operation Khwakh Ba De Sham	September 2009-21 January 2011	Kurram Agency; Orakzai Agency	Pakistani victory: 100% Orakzai and 90% of Kurram returned to Pakistani control; Militants fled to white mountains of Afghanistan Pakistan border; Sporadic militant attacks from white mountains continued in Kurram Agency
	Operation Brekhna	3 November 2009 – 20 December 2012	Mohmand Agency	Pakistani victory: Mohmand Agency fell back into the government control; Leadership of TTP fled to Afghanistan; Failure to kill or capture Ayman al-Zawahiri; Enduring peace in Mohmand
	Operation Koh-e-Sufaid	4 July 2011 – 18 August 2011	Kurram Agency	Pakistani victory: Militants flushed out from white mountains of Koh-e-Sufaid on Afghanistan Pakistan border in Kurram Agency.; Thall-Parachinar transit route secured at Kharlachi border.; Militants fled across Afghanistan-Pakistan border; Kurram Agency effectively secured from militant attacks originating from Koh-e-Sufaid range.; Gains of Orakzai and Kurram offensive consolidated; Militants continued to maintain presence in mountains of strong presence in Tirah Valley
	Operation Rah-e-Shahadat	5 April 2013 – 30 June 2013	Tirah Valley	Pakistani victory: Militants flushed out from Tirah Valley; Headquarters of Lashkar-e-Islam destroyed; TTP and LeI leadership fled across Afghanistan; Militants continued to pose threat to Khyber Agency from across the border.
	Operation Zarb-e-Azb	12 June 2014 – 22 February 2017	North-Waziristan Agency	Pakistani victory: The last remaining agency of FATA, North Waziristan Agency descended back under Pakistani control.; The headquarters of TTP at Miranshah was destroyed.; Pakistani forces recaptured last remaining valley of Shawal on Pakistan-Afghanistan border by early 2016.; The civilians deaths from 3000 in 2012 to 600 in 2016.; War in North-West Pakistan was reduced to low-intensity insurgency; National Action Plan conceived to fight extremism
	Operation Khyber	7 October 2014 – 21 August 2017	Khyber Agency	Pakistani victory: extension of Operation Zarb-e-Azb; Area from Bara till the border of Tirah Valley returned to government control under Operation Khyber-1; Under Operation Khyber-2 the main Tirah Valley cleared and returned under government control by 15 June 2015, marking the first anniversary of Operation Zarb-e-Azb; Area beyond Tirah Valley returned to government control under Khyber-3 that ended in July 2017; The last valley in Tirah, Rajgal Valley, located on Pakistan-Afghanistan border, was recaptured and secured by 21 August 2017.; With success of Operation Khyber three agencies of FATA namely, Kurram, Khyber and Orakzai agencies were successfully secured from all sides.; By mid-2017 more or less Government of Pakistan reestablished its authority over more or less 98% of the lost erstwhile FATA.; Fencing work began Afghanistan-Pakistan border.; Ensured long term peace in Khyber, Kurram and Orakzai.
	Operation Radd-ul-Fasaad	22 February 2017 – November 2022	Across Pakistan	Pakistani tactical victory Strategic failure: Unlike previous military campaign operation was not aimed at regaining lost territory but to purge Pakistan of sleeper cells that escaped across country; 375,000 intelligence-based operations conducted as of 2021; Afghanistan-Pakistan border barrier erected with 1000 military forts to man the border.; According to Delhi-based South Asian Terrorism Portal (SATP) 2019 was the most peaceful year for Pakistan since the time of start of insurgency in 2004, the suicide attacks in Pakistan in 2019 was decreased to 8 from record high of 85 in 2009.; The seven tribal agencies of FATA merged into Khyber-Pakhtunkhwa for effective governance in 2018.; Resurgence of New wave of terrorism since fall of Kabul in 2021
	Operation Azm-e-Istehkam	22 June 2024 – present	Across Pakistan and Afghanistan	Ongoing

With help of military campaigns Pakistan Army was able to push back TTP into Afghanistan from where it continues to launch terrorist attacks on Pakistan. By 2014, the casualty rates from terrorism in the country as a whole dropped by 40% as compared to 2011–2013, with even greater drops noted in Khyber Pakhtunkhwa despite a large massacre of schoolchildren by TTP terrorists in the province in December 2014. The reduction in hostilities eventually changed the conflict from a war to a relatively low-level conflict. However, massacre of schoolchildren in Peshawar and continues sense of insecurity forced Pakistani political leadership to draft National Action Plan.

=== National Action Plan 2014 and Operation Radd-ul-Fasaad 2017 ===
On 24 December 2014, the Parliament of Pakistan approved a 20-point National Action Plan to counter terrorism and extremism, that had been chalked out by the National Counter Terrorism Authority. The decision was taken following a terrorist attack on the Army Public School in Peshawar. The plan was envisaged to undertake non-kinetic and kinetic measures to fight terrorism and extremism.

In line with National Action Plan, Pakistan launched Operation Radd-ul-Fasaad under its commander COAS Qamar Javed Bajwa. This operation was launched in order clean-off militants that escaped across country due to army's earlier campaigns in FATA. The operation was aimed at consolidating efforts of previous military campaigns.

Radd-ul-Fasaad vowed to tackle cross border militancy, purge sleeper cells in Urban Pakistan, flush of remnants militants escaped across country, and pursuit National Action Plan.The operation entailed the conduct of Broad Spectrum Security (Counter Terrorism) operations by Rangers in Punjab and Sindh, and by the Frontier Corps in Balochistan and Khyber-Pakhtunkhwa and focus on more effective border security management. Countrywide disarmament and explosive control were also given as additional objectives of the operation. The National Action Plan was pursued as the hallmark of this operation.

Radd-ul-Fasaad resulted in major successes in counter-terrorism.

As a result of Radd-ul-Fasaad, TTP suffered huge losses and divided into various splinter groups that weakened its operational capabilities. According to Delhi-based South Asian Terrorism Portal (SATP) 2019 was post peaceful year for Pakistan since the time of start of insurgency in 2004. According to SATP, The suicide attacks in Pakistan in 2019 was decreased to 8 from record high of 85 in 2009. By 2021, More than 375,000 operations have been carried out against terrorists, including over 150,000 in Sindh, 3,4000 in Punjab, more than 80,000 in Balochistan and over 92,000 in Khyber Pakhtunkhwa.

Operation was a tactical victory for Pakistan as country saw consolidation of gains of Operation Zarb-e-Azb by further denting the terrorist capability to carry out activities against Pakistan which was visible in drastic drop in suicide and IED attacks. Yet it deemed as a strategic failure due to failure of operation to achieve objectives of National Action Plan. The country failed to foster durable peace, specially after Taliban's takeover of Afghanistan in August 2021. The political change in Afghanistan triggered new wave of terrorism in Pakistan. Since 2022 Pakistan has seen a visible uptick in terrorism-related incidents.

=== Resurgence in Insurgency since August 2021 ===
After 2019, country saw slow implementation on the National Action Plan specially on its primary aim of combating extremism. Resultantly since fall of Kabul in August 2021, Pakistan is confronted with renewed threat of terrorism as TTP has been injected with fresh dose of strength due to the victory of Taliban in Afghanistan. The fresh recruits, easy access to US made weapons, and a sanctuary under the shadow of Afghan Taliban have once again bolstered the TTP to again target Pakistan. In 2023, Pakistan saw an increase in terror incidents, especially in Balochistan and Khyber Pakhtunkhwa after the banned militant group Tehreek-i-Taliban Pakistan terminated its ceasefire with the government in November 2022.

In 2022 After failure of negotiations, the TTP and the government announced a ceasefire in June 2022. However, in November 2022, the TTP renounced the ceasefire and called for nationwide attacks against Pakistan.

=== 2022 Pakistani airstrikes in Afghanistan ===
Surge in terrorism led Pakistan to strike on TTP safe havens present on Afghan soil. On 16 April 2022, the Pakistani military conducted predawn airstrikes on multiple targets in Afghanistan's Spera District of Khost and Shultan District of Kunar provinces. Afghan officials said the attacks killed at least 47 civilians and injured 23 others. Initial reports described the attacks as either rocket strikes or aerial strikes carried out by a number of aircraft of the Pakistan Air Force, and Afghan officials claimed the operation was carried out by Pakistani military helicopters and jets. Pakistani officials initially denied Pakistan carried out the airstrikes, but Pakistani security officials later claimed the airstrikes involved drone strikes from inside Pakistani airspace, and that no aircraft were deployed. Some reports said the Pakistani airstrikes also targeted parts of Paktika Province. According to the Pakistani media and some Afghan media outlets, the attacks targeted militants belonging to Tehrik-i-Taliban Pakistan (TTP).

2022 Pakistani airstrikes marked the first instance of foreign country launching attack on Afghanistan after establishment of Islamic Emirate of Afghanistan and withdrawal of US from Afghanistan.

=== 2024 Pakistani airstrikes in Afghanistan ===
On 18 March 2024, in response to the attack from Afghanistan, Pakistan Air Force carried out two intelligence based airstrikes on Afghanistan's eastern border provinces of Khost and Paktika. The Afghan government claim that Pakistan killed five women and three children. Pakistan denies this, claiming that it killed terrorists instead while targeting the Hafiz Gul Bahadur militant group, a splinter organisation of the Pakistani Taliban, and that it had successfully killed Sehra alias Janan, a high-value target commander. Another commander, Abdullah Mehsud, was claimed to have been killed, but later released a video refuting the claim. It was also reported that Mehsud's house was targeted in which his wife and a minor son was killed. Pakistan went on to blame the Pakistani Taliban and its splinter militias for the deaths of hundreds of Pakistani civilians, and claimed that they used Afghanistan as a base and that they had support from within the Taliban.

2024 Pakistani airstrikes marks the third instance of foreign country launching attack on Afghanistan after establishment of Islamic Emirate of Afghanistan and withdrawal of US from Afghanistan followed by 2022 Pakistani Airstrikes and 2022 US Drone attack in Kabul

Given the deteriorating law and order situation in North-West Pakistan, on 7 April 2023, Pakistan's National Security Committee under leadership of Prime Minister Shehbaz Sharif decided to launch a new military operation to root out militants posing threats to its western regions. The meeting was also attended by the Pakistan's new military leadership COAS Asim Munir and CJCSC Sahir Shamshad Mirza.

On 2nd May 2024, the naval forces of Pakistan and the United States completed 4 day bilateral naval training exercises in Karachi. Between the 7th and 9th May of 2024 CENTCOM chief Michael Kurilla visited several parts of Khyber-Pakhtunkhwa and met the COAS Asim Munir as well as the leadership of Frontier Corps and the 7th Infantry Division. On 10 May 2024, a shuffling of corps commanders was announced, the commander of the XI Corps was changed from Azhar Hayat Khan to Omer Ahmed Bokhari. Hayat Khan's retirement five months prior to his scheduled retirement in November led to many analysts thinking that this early retirement was linked to increasing security threats in the AfPak region.

On 14th May 2024, a major was killed in an Intelligence Based Operation (IBO) in Sambaza, on 26th May a captain was killed in an IBO in hassan khel area, Peshawar. On 9th June a captain was killed by a roadside IED in Lakki Marwat.

On 22nd June 2024, Pakistan's Apex Committee on National Action Plan approved a new operation codenamed as Azb-e-Istehkam (Resolve for Stability) that is meant to address slow implementation of National Action Plan specially by addressing its vow of healing extremism across Pakistan.

By the end of 2024, Pakistan ranked 27th in Fragile state index, above Iraq.

== Approval and launch ==
On 22 June 2024, the operation was approved during a meeting of the Apex Committee on National Action Plan in Islamabad. The meeting was chaired by Prime Minister Shehbaz Sharif and attended by key federal cabinet members, chief ministers from all provinces including Gilgit-Baltistan, Azad Jammu and Kashmir, provincial chief secretaries, services chiefs, and others.

Pakistan Prime Minister Shehbaz Sharif clarified on 25 June 2024 that "Operation would not be large scale operation.Sharif said Operation Azm-e-Istehkam is being "misunderstood" and compared to previous military operations such as Operation Zarb-e-Azb and Operation Rah-e-Nijat. He said militants in these operations were killed for creating "no-go areas" in the country and for challenging the writ of the state, adding that they caused massive displacement of the population. There are currently no such no-go areas in the country as the ability of terrorist organisations to carry out large-scale organised operations inside Pakistan has been decisively defeated by past armed operations. Therefore, no large-scale military operation which would require population displacement is being contemplated.Its objective is to instill a new spirit and drive in the ongoing implementation of the revised National Action Plan, which was launched after a national consensus in the political arena. Operation Azm-e-Istekam is a multi-domain, multi-agency and national vision to bring about sustainable peace and stability in the country.

Pakistan's Defence Minister Khawaja Asif on 28 June 2024 added that Pakistan may carry out cross border strikes inside Afghanistan on terrorist bases enjoying safe havens on Afghan soil.

== Goals ==
The Operation is primarily aimed at speeding-up implementation of the Pakistan's National Action Plan (NAP) which was conceived in an aftermath of politico-military consensus in 2014 to combat extremism and terrorism within Pakistan. According to PMO statement, following objectives has been laid down in line with NAP.

The main objective of the operation is to end extremism and terrorism decisively and comprehensively. The operation aims to coordinate and coordinate efforts on multiple fronts to counter these threats, while intensifying efforts to curb terrorist activities through regional cooperation in the political and diplomatic arenas.

== Timeline ==
=== June 2024 ===
==== 22 June ====
- Counter Terrorism Department conducted a raid in Jamshoro District of Sindh capturing a militant.

==== 23 June ====
- Two Frontier Corps soldiers were killed in a militant attack on security forces in Dir District across the border from Afghanistan.
- Baloch Liberation Army claimed killing of a soldier in Zamuran tehsil.
- Counter Terrorism Department also captured 22 militants during various raids throughout Punjab.

==== 24 June ====
- Balochistan Liberation Army carried out an attack on a military base in Kalat allegedly claiming to have killed twelve soldiers, however official reports acknowledged the deaths of two Frontier Corps soldiers.
- Three militants were also killed in the attack.

==== 25 June ====
- Military related handles on X released a footage of drone strike on Masjilis-e-Askari Karwan of terrorists belonging to Hafiz Gul Bahadur group of Tehreek Taliban Pakistan in the Darga Peerpal area of Bannu District. Reportedly, three terrorists were claimed to be neutralied.
- A policeman was wounded in an attack on a police post in Orakzai District.
- Two militants were killed and three were wounded in an operation in Sra Derga area of Bannu District.
- Seven were injured when threw grenades on the security forces vehicles in North Waziristan.
- Three civilians were wounded in a militant attack near a police patrol.
- A girls school was torched in Mansehra District by militants.

==== 26 June ====
- Pakistani authorities report the arrests of Commander Nasrullah and Commander Idress in Quetta, who were two key Pakistani Taliban commanders. Moreover, six militants and two Pakistani soldiers were killed in Hassan Khel Tehsil, Peshawar District, during military raids on multiple hideouts.
- A Counter Terrorism Department and a security forces personnel were killed in two separate attacks in Bannu.
- A soldier was killed in a militant attack in Kech District.

==== 27 June ====
- On 27 June, in Tank District, military raids on insurgent bases killed ten militants and a military operation in Bagh, Khyber District resulted in the deaths of seven militants and five Pakistani soldiers.
- The house of Aslam Khan a tribal leader in the Lakki Marwat District was attacked by militants but caused no casualties. Moreover, a police station in Peshawar was attacked by militant rockets causing no casualties.
- Seven were injured on an attack on Frontier Corps vehicle in Quetta.

==== 28 June ====
- Pakistani ambassador to the United States, requested military aid including modern weaponry to aid in Operation Azm-e-Istehkam as well as addressing the need for strengthening of military ties between the two countries for fighting terrorism diplomatic comeback in Kabul.
- Rahat Khan, an influential person in Swabi was killed by unknown militants.
- Thirteen labourers were abducted from Tank District by militants, nine were rescued by a police operation.

==== 29 June ====
- A civilian was killed and his son wounded in a militant attack in Balochistan.
- Three explosions and gunfire were reported in Kech District near a military base with Balochistan Liberation Front claiming that it was an attack carried out by them.

==== 30 June ====
- On 30 June, the Government of Pakistan began the second phase of the deportation of Afghan refugees from Pakistan, this time with the target of expelling around 800,000 illegal migrants.
- A snooker club was set on fire in Khyber District by militants.
- A police special operative was killed in North Waziristan, Hafiz Gul Bahadur group claimed responsibility for his killing.
- A senior doctor attacked previously by militants over twenty five times, was killed by militants in Bajaur District.
- Militants also set up roadblocks in Dera Ismail Khan District and Bannu District for over an hour.
- A gas pipeline was damaged in Bolan District suspected to be a militant attack.
- The son of a local peace committee member was killed in Tank District.
- Two soldiers were killed in a rocket and grenade attack in Takhta Baig area of Khyber District.
- A logistical vehicle carrying food for soldiers was targeted by militants.

=== July 2024 ===
==== 1 July ====
- Three people were killed in a roadside bombing in Turbat District, Balochistan. Along with two members of security forces were killed in a rocket attack on their post in Jamrud, Khyber Pakhtunkhwa.
- Seven militants were killed in a military operation in Tirah including Pakistani Taliban commanders, Najeeb Abdul Ur Rehman and Ishfaq Muavia and two more militants were killed in a separate engagement in Lakki Marwat.
- A traffic Policeman was killed by militants in Peshawar.
- A person allegedly a militant was captured during a raid in Awaran District.
- Three civilians were killed and one injured in an attack in Turbat.

==== 2 July ====
- The gas pipeline supplying natural gas to Quetta was blown up by an Improvised Explosive Device near Machh, Bolan District. Moreover, three civilians were killed and one wounded in a shootout and bomb blast in Turbat.
- A soldier was killed and four wounded in an Improvised Explosive Device attack in Kalat District.
- An officer of the Sui Southern Gas Company was killed in Quetta.

==== 3 July ====
- Pakistan Army and United States Army troops started a two-week-long counterterrorism exercise in Pabbi, Khyber Pakhtunkhwa with the American troops being deployed at the National Counterterrorism Centre.
- Moreover, an IED bombing in Bajaur District killed senator Hidayat Ullah, who was campaigning in an election run-up, initial death toll was reported to be three but later rose to five.
- Furthermore, two members of security forces were also wounded in terrorist attacks on Polio vaccination teams in Bajaur District.
- Also, Pakistani security forces carried out an intelligence based operation in Bajaur District and Pakistani Taliban Commander Irfan Ullah after a firefight between security forces and militants.
- Also, a bomb attack and shootout in Kalat, Balochistan killed a Frontier Corps soldier along with a civilian working on the Sui gas field.
- Islamabad police foiled a terror attack ahead of Muharram by capturing a large amount of weapons and explosives after a firefight with militants who managed to flee.
- Two Policemen were killed and two wounded in an attack on a police station in Kashmore District.
- A soldier was killed in a militant attack in South Waziristan.
- Tehreek-e-Taliban Pakistan announced the launch of a retaliatory Operation Azm-e-Shariat to counter Operation Azm-e-Istehkam. Jamaat-ul-Ahrar announced the launch of their own Operation Al Ra'ad.

==== 4 July ====
- In Khaplu, Gilgit Baltistan another Pakistani Taliban commander Shah Faisal who was responsible for multiple terrorist attacks in the region was killed in a military operation.
- Clashes were eventually extinguished after hours of fighting which left two civilians and four soldiers of Gilgit Baltistan Scouts wounded.

==== 5 July ====
- A roadside bombing in Mardan, Khyber Pakhtunkhwa killed three people and wounded eight people, including two police officers.
- Noor Rehman, the commander of Ghazi group of Pakistani Taliban was killed during an attempted cross border infiltration in North Waziristan.

==== 6 July ====
- A bomb planted by militants was diffused in Bajaur District.
- A policeman was killed by militants in Peshawar.
- A soldier was killed and another wounded in a militant attack in Tank District. Another soldier was killed and another wounded in Bolan District during an attack by Balochistan Liberation Army.
- Four soldier was killed in Awaran District and another in Khuzdar District by Balochistan Liberation Front.
- A police special operative was injured in an Improvised Explosive Device attack in Quetta.

==== 7 July ====
- A bombing in Bolan, Balochistan carried out by the Balochistan Liberation Army wounded a soldier of the Frontier Corps.
- A shooting in Karachi killed a senior Counter Terrorism Department official engaged against the Pakistani Taliban and Lashkar-e-Taiba, and a civilian passerby, and a private security guard was wounded in the incident and later succumbed to his injuries.
- Two people allegedly separatists were captured by security forces in Awaran District and Kech District.
- One soldier was wounded in a militant attack in Orakzai District.
- The vehicle of Jamiat Ulema-i-Islam politician Maulana Abdullah Nadeem was targeted in South Waziristan but he remained unharmed.

==== 8 July ====
- Three people allegedly separatists were captured from Kalat District and one more from Gwadar District.

==== 9 July ====
- A police officer and his three nephews were killed in a shooting in Dera Ismail Khan.
- In North Waziristan a military engagement between Pakistan Army and Pakistani Taliban led to the deaths of two militants and one army captain.
- Thirteen people were detained in Punjab during an operation conducted by the Punjab police against supposed militant activities before Ashura.
- Three soldiers were killed and twelve wounded in a gun battle in South Waziristan, casualties of militants are unknown.
- Three Frontier Corps soldiers were abducted in Tank District.
- An alleged separatist was captured from Awaran District.
- Four soldiers were killed and three wounded in a Balochistan Liberation Army attack.

==== 10 July ====
- An attack on Ashura observations was foiled when the Counter Terrorism Department arrested a key Pakistani Taliban militant Mohammad Shoaib in an operation in Karachi.
- An engagement in Hassan Khel Tehsil of the Peshawar District led to the deaths of four security personnel and three militants including militant commander Abdul Raheem.
- A highly wanted Pakistani Taliban militant Kifayat Ullah was killed in a Counter Terrorism Department operation.
- Three women were injured in a mortar attack on a policeman's house in North Waziristan.
- Two people were injured in Balochistan Liberation Army attack on a military supply vehicle.
- Two relatives of a tribal elder were killed in a militant attack.
- A Frontier Corps soldier was kidnapped from Tank District.

==== 11 July ====
- Turbat tehsildar was injured in a militant attack in Kech District.
- Two off-duty Frontier Corps personnel were killed in Bannu District.
- Two militants stopped an anti-polio vaccination team and snatched their vaccines and motorcycle.

==== 12 July ====
- The bodies of two security personnel who had been missing since 11 July in Tank were discovered.
- Two Pakistani Taliban militants, Abuzar and Yaqoob Masood, of the Hafiz Gul Bahadur group with alleged ties to the Islamic Emirate of Afghanistan were arrested during a raid by the Counter Terrorism Department in Karachi.
- A policeman and a civilian were killed in a militant attack on a police station in Mardan District.
- Militants set up a temporary road checkpoint in Tank District.
- Dead body of a person kidnapped by militants was discovered in South Waziristan.

==== 13 July ====
- A driver of the Frontier Corps was killed in a roadside bombing near Quetta.
- A Pakistani Taliban militant was arrested in Karachi during a raid by the Counter Terrorism Department.
- An off duty security personnel was killed in Dera Ismail Khan.
- An alleged separatist was detained in Gwadar.
- Two security forces personnel were wounded in an Improvised Explosive Device attack in Quetta.

==== 14 July ====
- A local journalist was killed by militants in Nowshera District.
- In Kalat District military carried out an offensive advancing rapidly in multiple areas such as Harboi, Iskalkoo, Chuto, Chashma, Maimonki, Aab-e-Dok, and also in the surroundings of Kalat District.

==== 15 July ====
- The Pakistani Taliban launched two coordinated attacks on the military cantonment in Bannu. A militant attacked the base with a vehicle loaded with explosives while another exploded a suicide vest outside the perimeter of the base. Eight soldiers and ten militants were killed and about 141 people including 7 civilians were wounded in the attacks. At least eight civilians were amongst the injured. Several houses and buildings were damaged. The attack caused significant casualties but was unsuccessful in its main aim to penetrate and capture the garrison.
- Jaish-e-Fursaan-e-Muhammadi, a faction within the Hafiz Gul Bahadur group of the Pakistani Taliban claimed responsibility. Military helicopters were dispatched to the region and ground troops were also deployed in the region.
- A military operation was conducted in the area by Pakistan Army. The Special Service Group was also deployed in the area.
- Moreover, two children were killed in North Waziristan in a landmine blast.

==== 16 July ====
- Five civilians (two children and two female health operatives) were killed in a militant attack on a health facility in Dera Ismail Khan. The military then engaged the militants, killing three of them. Two soldiers died in the skirmishes.
- Militants attacked a Police checkpoint in Bannu District but the attack was thwarted by a police counterattack.

==== 17 July ====
- Four alleged separatists were detained from Awaran District by security forces personnel.

==== 18 July ====
- A policeman was killed in South Waziristan by militants while on duty.

==== 19 July ====
- A senior Al Qaeda leader Amin al-Haq who was a close associate of Osama bin Laden and was on the United Nations global list of wanted terrorists was arrested by the Counter Terrorism Department in a raid on his hideout in Sarai Alamgir, Punjab.
- Three people including a policeman were killed in an attack in Khyber Pakhtunkhwa meanwhile a Frontier Corps soldier was killed in Balochistan.
- Two civilians were killed in a shootout during a peace rally, this attack is suspected to be a militant attack.
- A soldier of Frontier Corps Balochistan (South) was killed and seven injured in Kech District in a militant attack.
- One policeman was killed and two wounded in a militant attack in Mardan District. Balochistan Liberation Front commander Wahid Qambar Baloch was captured by Pakistani Intelligence Agencies.
- Two civilians were killed and two wounded in a bomb blast in South Waziristan.
- Militants used an Improvised Explosive Device to target a Counter Terrorism Department vehicle, carrying senior personnel, three personnel and threw civilians were wounded in the blast.

==== 20 July ====
- A person was killed by militants in Kech District.
- Balochistan Liberation Front attacked an outpost in Panjgur District killing two soldiers and wounding another.
- An off duty police officer was killed in Kohat District while on vacation.
- Baloch Liberation Army claimed to have killed an Inter Services Intelligence agent in Turbat.
- Dead body of a school teacher killed by militants was found in Tank District.
- Two civilians were killed in a landmine blast in Buner District.

==== 21 July ====
- Three militants tried to infiltrate into Pakistan from Afghanistan by crossing the Afghanistan-Pakistan border in Dir District but all three were killed in a subsequent clash with Pakistan Army.
- A female police officer of the Motorway Police was targeted in Nowshera District but she remained safe.
- Militants destroyed a girls school in North Waziristan. District in Khyber Pakhtunkhwa
- A Policeman was killed by militants in Peshawar.
- A retired Army soldier was killed by militants in Mohmand District.
- One soldier was killed and two wounded in a Balochistan Liberation Front attack on their post in Kech District while two more were killed and another wounded in a separate attack in the same district.

==== 22 July ====
- Militants destroyed a government run girls school in North Waziristan completely razing its seven classrooms however, no casualties were reported.
- Moreover, three Policemen were wounded in a bomb blast near their vehicle in Khyber District.
- A civilian driver was killed and two wounded in militant attacks in Harnai District.
- A soldier was killed and another was wounded in a Balochistan Liberation Front attack on their convoy.

==== 23 July ====
- A senior teacher was killed by Pakistani Taliban militants in Tirah as a part of Pakistani Taliban's campaign against female education.
- A Policeman was wounded in an attack on a police station in Peshawar.
- One soldier was killed and two wounded in a Balochistan Liberation Army attack in Kharan District.
- A militant commander was killed in as shootout with Counter Terrorism Department in Karachi.
- Three Pakistani soldiers and one Balochistan Liberation Army commander were killed in skirmishes in Kech District. (Note: the casualties of other militants are unknown like other BLA and BLF attacks as BLA and BLF don't disclose their casualties)

==== 24 July ====
- In Hoshab, Balochistan, Pakistan Army conducted an intelligence based operation killing one militant while wounding two others. Their weapons and ammunition were also confiscated and a further clearance operation was carried out.
- A gas pipeline from Sui to Karachi was damaged by Baloch Republican Guards in Kashmore District.
- A Frontier Corps soldier was killed in Orakzai District during a militant raid on a security post.
- Two policemen were injured in a militant attack on a security post in Swat District, the militants managed to flee.

==== 25 July ====
- Seventeen surrendered Pakistani Taliban militants initially set free by the government in exchange for their surrender were rearrested in Bannu by Khyber Pakhtunkhwa Police as a part of a new campaign to spare no militants, their vehicles, weapons and ammunition were seized.
- A counter terrorism unit of police was attacked in Mohmand District, the clash resulted in the deaths of one policeman and a militant.
- Two police officers were targeted in Dera Ismail Khan by militants but evaded their attack.
- Four people allegedly separatists were detained by security forces in Quetta.
- Security Forces attacked a vehicle in Kech District and detained its occupants who were allegedly separatists.
- Balochistan Liberation Front attacked a military camp in Awaran District.
- Three civilians were killed by Baloch Raji Aajoi Sangar in Panjgur District on the allegations of being state collaborators.

==== 26 July ====
- A militant commander named Razaq, a close associate of Hafiz Gul Bahadur was killed by Pakistan Army in North Waziristan.

==== 27 July ====
- Four militants were killed in a military operation in Tank District, their weapons and ammunition was confiscated.
- A Frontier Constabulary personnel was killed and five wounded in a militant attack on a police station in Kurram District.
- At least four Pakistani Taliban militants were killed in an Intelligence-based Operation in Tank District.
- The Counter Terrorism Department captured 38 militants in 449 intelligence-based operations across Punjab.

==== 28 July ====
- A Counter Terrorism Department personnel was killed by militants in Mardan District.
- Istehkam-e-Pakistan Party politician Zaigham Sultan Tarrar was killed by militants in Hafizabad District.
- Two people were killed in Mingora by militants.

==== 29 July ====
- Three militants and a policeman were killed in an intelligence based operation in Mohmand District while a wanted militant Satifullah was killed and three militants were wounded in an engagement in Dera Ismail Khan and a militant was killed in an engagement with security forces in North Waziristan.
- The Counter Terrorism Department captured two wanted militants during a raid in Pakistan.
- In a separate incident in Hyderabad, Pakistan, two militants of Sindhudesh Revolutionary Army were captured and their planned attack on Independence Day celebrations was thwarted.

==== 30 July ====
- Two United Nations officials escaped unharmed when Pakistani Taliban attacked their vehicle in Tank District.

==== 31 July ====
- An attack on a Balochistan Levies post in Milizai area of Pishin resulted in the deaths of two levies personnel. Another attack on the same post just after eight hours wounded a policeman.
- Moreover, an attack on Charwazgai check post in Khyber District claimed the lives of two policemen as well as wounding another, a civilian security guard at a nearby gas station was also wounded.
- A private security vehicle was hijacked by militants who stole more than 50 million PKR.
- Three people including a retired security personnel and his two relatives were killed in North Waziristan by militants.

=== August 2024 ===
==== 1 August ====
- Traffic Policeman was killed by militants while on his way to duty in Lakki Marwat District.

==== 2 August ====
- Two policemen were killed in a militant attack on their convoy in Tank District while escorting the vehicles of two judges. The judges however remained safe.
- Balochistan Liberation Front militants destroyed an internet tower in Kech District.
- Balochistan Liberation Front claimed to have captured a vehicle carrying supplies for the Pakistani military in Kech District.

==== 3 August ====
- Four militants were killed in Mardan District during an operation conducted by armed forces and Counter Terrorism Department.
- A Policeman was injured in a militant attack in Dera Ismail Khan.
- One soldier was killed and three injured in a Balochistan Liberation Front attack in Kech District while another soldier was killed in a Balochistan Liberation Army attack in Awaran District.
- Balochistan Liberation Army also claimed destruction of a military vehicle in Kech District.
- The Counter Terrorism Department captured three militants including an ISIS-K commander.

==== 4 August ====
- A tribal jirga in Lakki Marwat asked the military to launch a comprehensive campaign to flush out all militants from the territory of the district as the militants were reported to become a serious threat to local security.

==== 5 August ====
- Two people were including a teacher were killed by militants in South Waziristan.
- The National Counter Terrorism Authority also decided to launch operations against militants as a part of the wider campaign.

==== 6 August ====
- A Frontier Corps soldier was killed and another wounded in a militant attack in South Waziristan District.

==== 7 August ====
- A bomb blast occurred in Peshawar with the target being a special force vehicle of the Khyber Pakhtunkhwa Police, no casualties were reported.

==== 8 August ====
- A Sindhudesh Revolutionary Army leader was captured by Counter Terrorism Department while attempting to carry out a bomb blast on a train travelling from Punjab to Sindh, explosives and other such materials were also apprehended.
- Two militants escaped from the custody of Counter Terrorism Department in Mohmand District after being allegedly tortured and made way to Afghanistan.
- Militants attacked security company vehicle in Dera Ismail Khan and looted PKR 8 million from it.
- Two hand grenade explosions were reported at Sardar Bahadur Khan Women's University in Quetta during pre-independence day celebrations.
- A police station was attacked in Nasirabad District by militants, no casualties were reported.

==== 9 August ====
- In Tirah, militants attacked three Pakistan Army positions along the border with Afghanistan, a heavy gun battle ensued between the security forces and militants of Hafiz Gul Bahadur group resulting in the confirmed deaths of four soldiers. (Note: Three on 9 August, and an officer on 11 August from injuries sustained during the combat)
- Pakistan Army (local sources reported six military fatalities) personnel and four militants, about twelve soldiers were also wounded, the militants also claimed to have destroyed an Armoured Personnel Carrier and a military excavator, moreover artillery shells were also launched in the area.
- In Bannu a police SHO and two other officers were wounded in a militant attack on a police patrol, a civilian was killed and two civilians were wounded.
- A policeman was also killed by militants in a separate incident in Bannu.

==== 10 August ====
- Three civilians were injured in a bomb blast targeting a police vehicle in Awaran District, the police vehicle suffered no damages.
- Two Sindhudesh Liberation Army militants were captured by the Counter Terrorism Department in Larkana and their weapons, explosives and equipment were seized.
- The Balochistan Liberation Front attacked a military post in the Kharan District.
- Two Frontier Corps personnel were abducted from South Waziristan and their dead bodies were retrieved the next day.
- Three alleged militants were captured by security forces from the Kech District.

==== 11 August ====
- A dead body was recovered from Tank District.
- Frontsman of the Sipah-e-Sahaba Pakistan survived an assassination attempt.
- An Oil and Gas Company employee survived an abduction attempt by militants in Lakki Marwat District.
- Four soldiers including an officer were injured in a militant attack in North Waziristan.
- The vehicle of a SHO was attacked by militants but caused no casualties.
- Militants carried out three rockets attacks in Turbat.

==== 12 August ====
- Three Afghan civilians were killed in cross border skirmishes between Afghan Taliban and Pakistan Army, three Pakistani troops were also wounded in the skirmishes.
- Four Frontier Corps personnel were killed and 27 others were wounded in militant attacks on their posts in South Waziristan, a search operation was launched against the perpetrators.
- A local tribal elder was killed and another one was wounded in an Improvised Explosive Device attack in Bajaur.
- Two militants were killed by security forces in Panjgur.
- A Frontier Corps soldier was killed by militants in Bannu District while off-duty.
- A surrendered militant was assassinated in Kurram District.
- The Deputy Commissioner of Panjgur District, Zakir Baloch, was killed and Municipal Committee Chairman, Abdul Malik Baloch was injured in a militant attack on their vehicle.

==== 13 August ====
- A policeman was killed and another wounded in a grenade attack on a police checkpost in Lower Dir, with police retaliation forcing the militants to flee.
- Militants also carried out an attack on a check post at Shangla's tourist destination Yakhtangay but was thwarted by strong police retaliation.
- A child was killed and 12 wounded, in militant attacks at a hotel and a bridge near Quetta Railways station.
- A check post in Quetta was also attacked by militants but caused no casualties.
- Militants also attacked a post in Noshki district, causing no casualties. *In Khyber district, police claimed having repulsed two militant attacks, one on a police post and another near a protest camp by effectively engaging the militants.
- A tribal elder was killed and another was severely wounded in a militant attack in Bajaur District.
- Balochistan Liberation Army carried out a bomb blast at Sariab Mill Girls College in Quetta during preparations for independence day celebration.
- Nawab Ghaus Bakhsh School in Quetta was also targeted with a bomb blast on August 13 in an explosion during preparations for independence day celebration.
- Militants attacked a post in Panjgur District but no casualties were reported.
- A bomb blast took place at Bugti Stadium in Kharan District causing no casualties. Six militants and four soldiers were killed in an engagement in South Waziristan. *Two militants involved in the killing of the Panjgur DC were killed in Panjgur District.
- Two people were killed and three wounded in militant attacks on civilian houses in Quetta.
- A skirmish took place between Frontier Corps and separatists in Kharan District.
- A girls' high school on Munir Mengal Road in Quetta was attacked by militants.

==== 14 August ====
- In South Waziristan, a checkpost and a police station were attacked by militants but the militants were repulsed after an intense battle, the checkpost wasn't damaged but a civilian house was hit by a Mortar shell.
- An alleged separatist was in Kech District during a raid.
- A bomb blast occurred at a military checkpoint in Nushki District; no casualties were reported. Unknown militants attacked a military camp in Kech District using heavy weaponry causing significant material damage.
- A singer was detained in Quetta by security forces over allegations of being a separatist. A man was killed by militants in Kech District.
- Two alleged separatists were detained from Kharan District by security forces.
- Balochistan Liberation Front attacked seven military posts and a military camp in Awaran District killing six soldiers and wounding eleven more and also two checkpoints and military camp in Kech District killing three soldiers and wounding seven, militant casualties were unclear. (Note: Casualties were reported by BLF which did not disclose its own losses)

==== 15 August ====
- A huge police contingent including special operatives and Armoured Personnel Carriers was deployed in Dadu District against heavily armed militants who had previously killed a policeman, police operations were carried out in Mondar, Ismail Ja Bhan, Keti Jatoi and surrounding villages.
- Seven militants were killed and five others were wounded in an intelligence based military operation carried out in Kurram District, their weapons and ammunition amongst other items were seized and a subsequent clearance operation was launched in the area.
- A large militant contingent, of around fifty to sixty militants attacked Lakhani police post at the border of Punjab and Khyber Pakhtunkhwa but the police launched its own counterattack forcing the militants to retreat.
- A policeman was wounded in a militant attack in Lower Dir.
- A pro-government "death squad" member was killed by unknown militants in Balochistan and a civilian was killed by the "death squad" group in Kech District.
- Baloch Liberation Army attacked a military post in Kalat District wounding three Pakistan Army soldiers.

==== 16 August ====
- Five people including two policemen were wounded in an Improvised Explosive Device explosion in Peshawar.
- Two Shia civilians were wounded in a militant attack on their bus in Dera Ismail Khan, the bus went out of control further injuring three civilians.
- A police station was attacked by militants in Nasirabad District, no casualties were reported. A military post was attacked by militants in Turbat.
- Five dead bodies ridden with bullets were recovered from Chagai District.
- Three militants were killed and another one wounded in a military operation in North Waziristan.

==== 17 August ====
- A suspected separatist was captured by security forces from Kharan District.
- Three people were wounded in a bomb blast near Balochistan University in Quetta.
- A civilian was killed and another wounded in a militant attack in Turbat.
- A militant was killed in an operation carried out by the Counter Terrorism Department in Gujranwala District.

==== 18 August ====
- Two soldiers were killed and three were wounded in a militant attack on their convoy in Dera Ismail Khan while a policeman was killed and three others wounded in another militant attack in Lakki Marwat.
- A Tablighi Jamat affiliated businessman was killed by militants in Bajaur District.
- A traffic policeman was killed by militants in Bajaur District.
- Two Police personnel including an SHO were killed in a militant attack in Lakki Marwat.

==== 19 August ====
- Militants of Pakistani Taliban and Lashkar-e-Islam started their own patrols questioning the writ of government in Tirah as the police and levies had retreated from the area.
- Three more militants involved in the assassination of Panjgur DC murder were killed in an operation in Mastung District.
- A Frontier Corps soldier was killed in a skirmish with Taliban at the Pakistan-Afghanistan border in Nushki District, meanwhile three Pakistan Army soldiers and five Taliban militants were killed in skirmishes at the border in Bajaur District.
- Two Police personnel were wounded in a militant attack in Hangu District.
- A large scale military operation was started in Kalat District, gunships and helicopters were dispatched, artillery strikes were carried out and multiple strikes were reported.

==== 20 August ====
- Security Forces were attacked by militants in Nushki District damaging a military vehicle.
- Three militants were killed in an operation conducted by the Counter Terrorism Department in Dera Ismail Khan, weapons and ammunition were seized.
- Two civilians were killed in a blast targeting military vehicles in Balochistan.
- Two militants were killed in a skirmish between militants and military forces in Panjgur District.

==== 21 August ====
- Two factions of Pakistani Taliban clashed over a financial dispute after looting of a cash transporting security vehicle, killing five militants.
- A tribal elder was killed by militants in Bannu District.
- Militants attacked a construction company and destroyed equipment in Kech District.

==== 22 August ====
- Bandits of Kutch attacked a police convoy in Rahim Yar Khan killing eleven policemen and wounding seven more.
- Two children were killed and six people wounded in an attack on a school bus in Attock.
- Large scale military operations were being carried out in Mastung and Bolan District including both ground offensive and aerial assault by gunships.

==== 23 August ====
- Three people including a security forces personnel were wounded in a militant attack outside a mosque in Bajaur District.

==== 24 August ====
- A bomb blast in Pishin by Pakistani Taliban killed three civilians and wounded thirteen people including two policemen.
- A civilian was killed by militants in Kech District.
- A Sindhi man was killed by militants in Nushki District.
- Two policemen were wounded while engaging with two militants entering Taunsa Sharif from KPK.
- Two Pakistani Taliban militants were killed in a military operation in Lakki Marwat.
- Three SNGPL employees were kidnapped by militants from Bannu.

==== 25 August ====
- 23 civilians were killed after being offloaded from their vehicles and their IDs being checked by Balochistan Liberation Army militants, the reason for the killing was described as belonging to the Punjabi ethnic group.
- Several engagements tool place between law enforcement and militants in Balochistan leading to the deaths of at least twelve militants.
- Militant attacks in Kalat District lead to eleven deaths including law enforcement.
- Militants attacked a police station in Pasni, wounding policemen and destroying three vehicles.
- A police station in Suntsar was ransacked with the militants capturing weaponry.
- A Balochistan Levies station was attacked in Khadkocha with the personnel being taken captive.
- Multiple other engagements tool place in Kalat, four Levies personnel, a policeman, two civilians and a tribal leader were amongst those killed. Assistant commissioner of Kalat was wounded and four Levies personnel were wounded.
- Many engagements occurred at the Quetta-Karachi highway with the traffic being blocked. Levies and police stations in Mastung, Sibi, Panjgur, Mastung, Turbat, Bela, and Quetta were also attacked by militants.
- A railway track linking Pakistan and Iran was destroyed near Mastung.
- 6 people were killed by militants in Bolan.
- The total death toll of the militant attacks in Balochistan was reported to be 26 civilians, 14 law enforcement personnel and 21 militants, later the toll was reported to be 73–74 with only the civilian casualties being revised.
- A Sindhi man was killed by Balochistan Liberation Army.

==== 26 August ====
- Balochistan Liberation Army claimed that the attacks on the previous day, names as Operation Fidayeen Herof had killed 120 soldiers and they had briefly captured a military camp in Las Bela, the blockades on high way were lifted. Fidayeen Unit, Majeed Brigade, Special Tactics Operations Unit took part in this "operation". (Note: Most Pakistani and international sources reported that 14 soldiers were killed and 21 militants were killed) However, most Pakistani and international sources state that only 14 Pakistani servicemen were killed.
- Inter Services Public Relations released a statement about having killed 25 militants including a commander in a campaign in Khyber District since 20 August, meanwhile 4 soldiers were killed.
- The bullet ridden dead bodies were discovered in Nasirabad District.

==== 27 August ====
- An alleged separatist was captured from Kech District
- A journalist was killed by unknown militants in Ghotki District.

==== 28 August ====
- A police checkpost was attacked in Swat District wounding two personnel with one dying the next day.
- Four Government employees were kidnapped from Dera Ismail Khan District with Pakistani Taliban releasing a video of one of the captives, the next day.

==== 29 August ====
- Five militants were killed and three wounded in military operations in Kech District, Panjgur and Zhob.

==== 30 August ====
- As a result of attacks against civilians and servicemen by the Balochistan Liberation Army which left over 70 dead, the Pakistani army ramped up operations and neutralised 5 BLA insurgents.
- Two alleged separatists were captured by security forces from Kech District.

==== 31 August ====
- The Pakistani military intensified IBOs in the Tirah valley, killing 37 insurgents, including their ringleader, Abu Dhar, alias Saddam. The IBOs were carried out by the Special Service Group, and Pakistani casualties were said to be kept to a minimum.
- Three militants were killed and four soldiers were injured in an operation in South Waziristan.
- Two bomb disposal unit personnel were wounded in a militant attack in South Waziristan.
- Two soldiers were wounded in a militant attack on a helipad in Miranshah.

=== September 2024 ===
==== 1 September ====
- A bomb blast in Bajaur led to the death of one person and wounding of two others.
- Two people were wounded in a bomb blast in Quetta.
- Two Policemen were injuredin Mianwali during a militant attack.

==== 2 September ====
- Three soldiers of the Frontier Constabulary and four private security guards were returned as a result of negotiations with militants.
- Militants destroyed a government school in Buner and then as a police vehicle reach the area it was targeted in an IED attack but caused no casualties.

==== 3 September ====
- A police officer was killed by militants in Quetta.

==== 4 September ====
- A policeman was killed by militants in Lakki Marwat.

==== 6 September ====
- A policeman was killed by militants in Lakki Marwat District.
- A Pakistani Taliban commander Ghulam Mawlawi was killed in a military operation in Lakki Marwat District.
- Five militants were killed by Counter Terrorism Department in Pishin District.
- Three suicide bombers were killed in an attack on Mohmand Rifles HQ but failed to cause significant damage.
- A policeman was kidnapped by militants in Bannu District.

==== 7 September ====
- Counter Terrorism Department captured 33 suspected militants in 475 intelligence based operations conducted throughout Punjab. These militants belonged to various organisations including Tehreek-i-Taliban Pakistan, ISIS-K, Al-Qaeda, Sipah-i-Sahaba Pakistan, Lashkar-e-Jhangvi, and Jamaat-ul-Ahrar. In addition five kg explosives, two grenades, two IEDs, 26 detonators, 73 ft fuse wire, four guns, ammunition, a large sum of cash, mobile phones amongst other contraband were seized.
- Pakistan Army and Afghan Taliban clashed in multiple areas of Khost District and Kurram District resulting in the deaths of at least eight Taliban including two commanders of the Afghan Taliban, Khalil and Jan Muhammad and further wounding of sixteen Afghan Taliban. Five Pakistani personnel were also killed in the skirmishes. Open Source Intelligence also claimed one soviet-era T-62 tank operated by Afghan Taliban destroyed by the Pakistani forces.
- Two brothers of an SHO were killed by militants in Lakki Marwat District.

==== 8 September ====
- A soldier of the Frontier Corps was killed and three more wounded in a militant ambush in Kurram District.
- A policeman was killed and his cousin was wounded in a militant attack in Lakki Marwat.
- A policeman and his brother were killed in another militant attack in Lakki Marwat.
- A bomb blast near a tribal leader's vehicle in South Waziristan led to the death of his son and injuries to four including the leader.
- A policeman was killed in a militant attack on a patrol vehicle in Panjgur District.

==== 9 September ====
- An explosion went off targeting a polio vaccination team wounding three healthcare workers, its responsibility was claimed by ISIS-K.
- Militants threw a suicide vest when asked to stop at a post in Peshawar.

==== 10 September ====
- A bomb blast took place in Wana wounding six policemen and seven civilians but the main target of the explosion, the VC, survived the attack.
- A suicide vest laden with 7 kg explosives was discovered in Peshawar.

==== 11 September ====
- A polio vaccination worker and a policeman were killed in a militant attack in Bajaur District.
- Five people were wounded in a bomb blast in Kech District.
- One soldier was killed in am IED attack in Bajaur District.
- The police station in Quetta was attacked by a grenade during a violent sectarian protest against alleged blasphemy.
- Three militants were killed in an operation while three soldiers were also killed and eleven more wounded in Kurram District.
- Two civilians and a Frontier Corps soldier were killed in a militant attack in South Waziristan.

==== 12 September ====
- A policeman's personal guesthouse was bombed by militants in Lakki Marwat.

==== 13 September ====
- Eight soldiers were injured in an IED attack on their vehicle in Kalat District.
- Four soldiers were killed and some more wounded in a Baloch Liberation Army attack in Kalat District.

==== 14 September ====
- Counter Terrorism Department conducted 71 operations throughout Punjab capturing nine militants as well as recovering explosives, two grenades, 26 detonators, 73 ft fuse wire, ammunition, guns, mobile phones, and cash.
- An alleged separatist was captured from Gwadar.
- Five people, including three civilians and two Levies personnel were killed and three personnel were wounded in a clash over the "illegal" abduction of an alleged separatist.
- Four soldiers were killed and three were injured in a Balochistan Liberation Front assault on the main military HQ in Awaran District.
- Three dead bodies of Pakistani Taliban were found in Dera Ismail Khan.
- Two policemen were killed in a remote controlled explosion near Quetta.

==== 15 September ====
- A dead body was recovered from North Waziristan.
- A dead body was recovered from Kech District.
- A policeman was killed by presumed insurgents in Lahore.
- Insurgents destroyed road construction equipment in Bannu District.
- A soldier was killed and another wounded in a Balochistan Liberation Front attack on personnel guarding a road construction.

==== 16 September ====
- A large military operation was started in Kalat District with Special Service Group and Pakistan Army Aviation being deployed to the area to neutralise separatists.

==== 18 September ====
- An alleged separatist was arrested from Lasbela District.
- An alleged separatist was also captured from Kech District.
- A bank manager of the National Bank of Pakistan was killed and two more injured in a militant attack in North Waziristan.
- A Police SHO was attacked by militant snipers in Dera Ismail Khan District but escaped the fire.
- A soldier was killed in Karak District while leaving his home for duty.
- Three workers at an electric grid station were injured in Nasirabad District in a separatist attack.
- Three separatists were killed and two escaped in an operation by Counter Terrorism Department in Nankana Sahib District.
- Unidentified militants destroyed a cellphone tower in Kohlu District.

==== 19 September ====
- A Motorway Police office was attacked in Mastung District but no damages were reported.
- A retired soldier was killed by three militants in Lakki Marwat District.
- An officer and a soldier were wounded when a bomb disposal squad was attacked by insurgents in South Waziristan District.
- A large scale military operation was conducted in Awaran District using armoured vehicles, military motorcycles, and infantry.
- Seven insurgents trying to infiltrate the Pakistan-Afghanistan border were killed in North Waziristan District.
- Six soldiers were killed and eleven wounded in a militant attack in South Waziristan District.
- The house of a Police officer was attacked by militants in Lakki Marwat District, eventually becoming a large scale fire exchange between the insurgents and armed local civilians.
- Three soldiers were killed in North Waziristan District as a result of militant attack on a road patrol team.
- Two Pakistani soldiers were killed while another was wounded in a skirmish with Afghan Taliban in North Waziristan District.

==== 20 September ====
- A SI of the Intelligence Bureau was killed and his brother wounded in an insurgent attack in Bannu District.
- Four children and a woman of the same family were wounded as a result of a landmine explosion in South Waziristan District.
- Six soldiers and five Pakistani Taliban were killed during a clash in South Waziristan.

==== 21 September ====
- An officer of the Anti Terrorist Force was killed and three others wounded in an attack in Zhob District.
- Counter Terrorism Department captured five militants in 65 intelligence-based operations throughout Punjab.

==== 22 September ====
- A former employee of the Intelligence Bureau was killed by militants in Bannu District.
- Seven people were wounded in a grenade attack on the vehicle of the Frontier Corps in Kharan District.
- One Pakistan Army personnel was killed in a Baloch Liberation Army rocket attack in Kharan District.

==== 23 September ====
- Militants attacked a diplomatic convoy in Swat killing a policeman and wounding five others, the diplomatic convoy included diplomats from Indonesia, Portugal, Kazakhstan, Bosnia, Zimbabwe, Rwanda, Turkmenistan, Vietnam, Iran, Russia, and Tajikistan.
- Two militants from Jaishul Umari faction of Hafiz Gul Bahadur Group of Pakistani Taliban were killed in a military operation in Bannu District.
- Baloch Liberation Army claimed killing an alleged state informant in Quetta.
- Two polio vaccine personnel were abducted by militants in Dera Ismail Khan District but later released on the condition of no longer participating in vaccination campaign.
- Two alleged Baloch separatists were captured by security forces.

==== 24 September ====
- An alleged Baloch separatist was captured from Sargodha.
- A police post was attacked by militants near Peshawar but a large police contingent was deployed and retaliated inflicting losses on the insurgents forcing them to retreat.
- A militant was killed and six more wounded while two soldiers were wounded in an operation in North Waziristan.
- A militant was killed and two escaped in a joint operation in Lakki Marwat District.
- A civilian was killed and three wounded in a mortar attack on a house during an engagement between militants and soldiers.
- One Pakistani Taliban commander was killed in an operation in Lakki Marwat District.
- A nephew of a Police officer was killed when militants attacked the family of a SHO in Tank District.
- A DSP of police was attacked by IEDs but his vehicle escaped in Dera Ismail Khan District.
- Two militants were killed and two policemen wounded when militants attacked a Police van in Swat District.

==== 25 September ====
- A Police post in Bajaur District was attacked by militants using small arms and rockets but no casualties were reported.
- "Aman Lashkars", the pro government militias formerly used against insurgents were reformed and reinstated in Lakki Marwat District.
- Two Policemen and ten civilians were wounded in an explosion targeting a police Vehicle in Quetta.
- Two soldiers were wounded in an attack by Afghan Taliban in Mohmand District.
- Four alleged separatists were captured from Kharan District in a joint raid by paramilitary forces along with Inter Services Intelligence using twenty vehicles.
- Insurgents attacked a post in Khyber District with two explosions being reported at the site.

==== 26 September ====
- A cop was killed and two other policemen were wounded in an insurgent attack in Bajaur District.
- A soldier was killed by a militant sniper in South Waziristan.
- Military forces conducted an operation in North Waziristan killing eight insurgents and wounding one.
- Two people including a child were killed and 23 others including 15 policemen were wounded in an explosion targeting a police station in Swabi.

==== 27 September ====
- A police vehicle escorting a polio vaccination team was attacked in Tank District with the vehicle sustaining damage.

==== 28 September ====
- A construction company camp was attacked by separatists who destroyed equipment.
- A politician of Balochistan National Party was killed by insurgents in Quetta.
- An explosion in Bajaur District wounded three policemen and damaged their vehicle, the responsibility was claimed by ISIS-K.

==== 29 September ====
- Militants attacked a security post killing four soldiers and wounding nine in Tirah with the responsibility being claimed by Lashkar-e-Islam, Jamaat-ul-Ahrar and Tehreek-e-Taliban Pakistan.
- A large-scale military operation was initiated in Gwadar District with a large number of personnel being deployed.
- Seven workers from Punjab were killed and another wounded in a separatist attack in Panjgur District.
- The son of a DSP was killed in Dera Ismail Khan.

==== 30 September ====
- A Policeman was wounded in a militant attack on a police post in Swat District.
- A tribal elder was killed by militants in Khuzdar District.
- Two soldiers were wounded in a BLA attack on a military post in Kech District.
- The Baloch Liberation Army – Azad confirmed the death of its six militants in Harnai District as a result of an airstrike.
- Two soldiers were killed and three wounded in a Baloch Liberation Army rocket and heavy weaponry attack on the military garrison in Kech District.
- Militants attacked a police station in Swat District. However the locals came to the defense of the police personnel and the combined contingent of police and locals repelled the militants.

=== October 2024 ===
==== 1 October ====
- A local Government official was killed by militants in Lakki Marwat District.
- Two soldiers were wounded in a grenade attack on a check post in Turbat.

==== 2 October ====
- A child and a militant were killed and a civilian wounded in an engagement between police and insurgents in Tank District.
- A customs enforcement inspector and his driver were abducted by militants from North Waziristan.
- An alleged separatist was captured from Turbat.

==== 3 October ====
- A policeman was wounded in a militant attack near the SITE Superhighway of Karachi.
- The vehicle of Deputy Commissioner of Shirani District was attacked by separatists but she remained unscathed.

==== 4 October ====
- The Pakistani Taliban commander who was responsible for the attack on Diplomatic Mission in Swat District was killed in a military operation.

==== 5 October ====
- Six soldiers were killed and 21 wounded in an insurgent ambush on a military convoy in North Waziristan.
- Eight soldiers were killed and two injured in a militant attack in Kurram District.
- Three soldiers were killed and four wounded when their vehicle was targeted in an IED attack in Kalat District.
- Four militants were killed in an operation conducted by Counter Terrorism Department Khuzdar District.
- Counter Terrorism Department killed 18 militants in 134 operations throughout Punjab.
- Two Pakistani Taliban militants were killed in an operation in Bannu District.

==== 6 October ====
- Seven Pakistani Taliban militants were killed in an operation conducted by Counter Terrorism Department in Mianwali District.
- Counter Terrorism Department killed two Tehreek-e-Taliban Pakistan militants during a raid in Karachi.
- Three Chinese engineers were killed and 13 others injured in a suicide attack on a Chinese convoy near Jinnah International Airport conducted by Majeed Brigade of Balochistan Liberation Army.
- Two soldiers were killed in a skirmish with Afghan Army in Nushki District.
- Two more militants were killed by the Counter Terrorism Department in Karachi.

==== 7 October ====
- A large scale military operation was initiated in Mastung District involving the use of aviation.

==== 8 October ====
- Eight soldiers were killed and three wounded in two attacks by Baloch Liberation Army in Mastung District.
- A military convoy was ambushed in Mastung District.

==== 9 October ====
- A Frontier Corps soldier and a suicide bomber were killed and 13 were wounded in an attack on the Joint Response Centre in Zhob District.
- An off-duty Frontier Corps soldier was abducted from Tank District.
- A local Shia elder was killed by militants in Orakzai District.
- Two alleged separatists were captured from Hub District.
- Three Policemen were wounded in an attack on a patrol vehicle in Bajaur District.
- Two Policemen were killed and two wounded in an attack on a police Vehicle in Tank District.
- Two Tehreek-e-Taliban Pakistan militants were killed by military in North Waziristan.
- A large scale militant attack in Turbat was foiled when military captured 280 kilograms of explosives.
- An alleged separatist was captured from Khuzdar District.
- Three alleged separatists were captured from the University of Punjab and the University of Lahore. * Two Pakistani Taliban militants were killed in a military operation in Bannu District.

==== 10 October ====
- A Pakistan People's Party leader Khan Muhammad Lotani was wounded, his son and a Balochistan Levies personnel were killed in a bomb blast in Khuzdar District.
- Four soldiers were killed and two wounded in a Balochistan Liberation Front ambush in Kech District.
- Nine soldiers were killed and 11 wounded in a Baloch Republican Army bomb attack on a convoy followed by a barrage of rockets and automatic weapons, in Dera Bugti.
- A joint operation by military and the Counter Terrorism Department resulted in the capture of two alleged separatists.
- A soldier was killed in a BLA attack on a military post in Bolan District.
- A member of the state backed "death squad" Militia was killed by separatists in Kech District.
- Two Tehreek-e-Taliban Pakistan militants were killed in a military operation in North Waziristan.

==== 11 October ====
- A policeman was killed in a militant attack in Shangla District.
- 20 miners of Pashtun ethnicity and a security guard were killed and seven wounded in a Baloch separatist attack on a coal mine in Duki District.
- An alleged separatist was captured from Kalat District.
- The Balochistan Liberation Front killed a Levies soldier in Awaran District.
- Three Pakistani Taliban were killed in a CTD operation in Sibi District and a cache of ammunition was captured.
- ISIS-K killed an alleged spy in KP.
- A Sub Divisional Officer and three team members were abducted from Dera Ismail Khan District by militants.
- Two wanted militants were killed in Sahiwal District.

==== 12 October ====
- A large scale operation was conducted in Kech District involving large number of infantry supported by helicopters.
- A militant was killed in South Waziristan.
- Two persons were wounded in a grenade attack in Sibi District.

==== 13 October ====
- A military convoy was ambushed in Turbat.
- A person was killed by militants in Turbat.
- Two attacks by Baloch Republican Army in Dera Bugti and Sui led to the deaths of two people.
- A road construction site was attacked by separatists and was completely destroyed in Kalat District.

==== 14 October ====
- A Frontier Corps soldier was killed and two civilians wounded in a militant attack in Tank District.
- A policeman was killed by militants in Bannu District.
- 14 people including three women were killed and seven wounded in attacks throughout Kurram District.
- Five Tehreek-e-Taliban Pakistan militants and four Policemen were killed in an attack on Bannu Police headquarters.
- The house of a police officer was attacked by militants in Buner District using a bomb.

==== 15 October ====
- The house of a Pakistan People's Party leader was attacked by militants in Larkana.
- Four alleged separatists were captured from Karachi.
- The Bomb Disposal Squad defused six live rockets in Narowal District.
- United States (US)-made military grade weapons, supplied by Afghan Taliban were confiscated at Torkham border.

==== 16 October ====
- Four policemen were wounded in an IED attack on a police van in Buner District.
- Two soldiers were killed in an IED attack in North Waziristan.

==== 17 October ====
- An IED blast occurred near a police mobile in Peshawar causing no casualties.
- A soldier was killed and four wounded in a Baloch Liberation Army attack on a convoy in Kech District.

==== 18 October ====
- A Levies troop was killed and two wounded in an attack on a post in Kalat District.

==== 19 October ====
- A Counter Terrorism Department officer was killed outside a mosque in Bannu District.
- A Frontier Corps checkpost was attacked in Bajaur District using rockets, prompting retaliatory strikes.
- A militant was killed and eight soldiers wounded in an attack on a checkpost in South Waziristan.
- Two Frontier Corps soldiers were wounded in an IED attack in Dera Ismail Khan District.
- Two militants were killed and five captured during two separate military operations in Zhob District and Pishin District.
- Two insurgent including a commander were killed by Takhtikhel tribe in Lakki Marwat District.

==== 20 October ====
- Three alleged separatists were captured from Panjgur District.
- Three Pakistani Taliban militants were arrested during an operation in Karachi.

==== 21 October ====
- A Pakistan People's Party leader was killed in Lasbela District.
- Militants of Pakistani Taliban and Lashkar e Islam having captured a large territory in Tirah established a parallel administration including parallel courts militant patrols and enforcement of Sharia law.

==== 22 October ====
- A policeman was killed in Lakki Marwat District.
- 2041 families have been displaced from Tirah.
- Two policemen were wounded in a grenade attack on a police checkpost in Bajaur District.

==== 23 October ====
- Two people were wounded in a grenade attack at the Irrigation office in Khuzdar.
- The vehicle of an SHO in Lakki Marwat District was attacked causing no casualties but some damage.

==== 24 October ====
- Nine militants including a high level commander were killed by a military operation in Bajaur District.
- A Frontier Corps soldier was killed in an attack in South Waziristan.
- A Policeman was wounded in a militant attack on a police station in Bannu District.
- A Policeman was killed in an attack conducted by six militants on the Account Office of South Waziristan District.
- 10 Frontier Constabulary were killed in a militant attack on a post Dera Ismail Khan District.
- 10 militants were killed in a battle with Counter Terrorism Department in Mianwali District.
- Four people including a tribal elder were wounded in an IED attack in Qilla Saifullah District.

==== 25 October ====
- An under training Army Lieutenant was killed two others wounded in a militant attack on a mosque during prayer.
- A combined post of the Police and Frontier Corps was attacked by militants in Bajaur District, the attack was repulsed with no casualties.
- A Jamiat Ulema-e-Islam (F) affiliate, Haji Sharifullah, was killed by militants in Bannu District.
- A Policeman was killed in a militant attack on a post in Khyber District.
- An SHO and a jail guard were killed and a civilian wounded in an attack on SHO's vehicle in Bannu District.
- The SHO of Wana station in South Waziristan was wounded in an IED attack.
- Two militants were killed during an unsuccessful attempt to attack a police van in Bannu District.
- Two soldiers were killed and three wounded and two militants were also killed during a skirmish at the Pakistan-Afghanistan border.

==== 26 October ====
- A "wanted militant", Ibrar alias Sangari, was killed during a premature explosion in North Waziristan.
- Tehreek-e-Taliban Pakistan uploaded videos and images of establishing checkpoints on the main road between Tank District and South Waziristan.
- Eight people including four Policemen and two soldiers, were killed and several wounded in a suicide blast in North Waziristan.
- Four Frontier Corps soldiers were wounded in an IED attack near their vehicle in Duki District.
- The guesthouse of a former Senator was destroyed in South Waziristan.
- The Sindhudesh Revolutionary Army carried out a grenade attack at a police post in Jamshoro District.

==== 27 October ====
- A military convoy was targeted in Tank District using remote controlled explosives but caused no damages.
- A policeman was killed in Bannu District on his way to a mosque.
- Two militants were killed and three wounded in a military operation in Khyber District.
- Two militants were killed in an operation in North Waziristan.
- An alleged separatist was captured from Mustang District and weapons, ammunition, and equipment were captured as well.

==== 28 October ====
- A DSB official of the Police was killed by militants in Lakki Marwat District.
- A Frontier Constabulary personnel was kidnapped from a mosque in Peshawar while praying.
- A policeman was killed by militants in Tank District during an attack on a hospital.
- A polio vaccination team was held hostage by insurgents at a dispensary in North Waziristan District, the weapons of security team were seized.
- At the historical Churchill picquet in Lower Dir District, insurgents attacked a security installation which retaliated.
- Five private security guards were killed by Balochistan Liberation Army in Panjgur District.
- Baloch Liberation Army killed a Military Intelligence (MI) operative, Syed Khan from Dera Bugti District, in Killi Qambrani area of Quetta. BLA claimed that Syed Khan was an informant for Pakistan's Military Intelligence and was involved in recruiting locals to spy for them.
- Two Frontier Corps soldiers were killed in an attack on Tall Scouts in Kurram District.
- Two assault rifles of Balochistan Levies deployed for polio vaccination security, were confiscated by militants in Mastung District.
- Two soldiers were killed in a militant attack on a bomb disposal unit in South Waziristan.

==== 29 October ====
- A polio vaccination team was attacked by insurgents in Kohat District but the team was able to escape following police retaliation.
- A militant was killed and another captured in military operation in Zhob District.
- The houses of Tehreek-e-Taliban Pakistan associates involved in the assassination of DSB official were seized in Lakki Marwat District.
- Two militants and a policeman were killed and another policeman was wounded in an attack on a polio vaccination team in Orakzai District.

==== 30 October ====
- Eight militants and three soldiers were killed while seven militants were wounded in an operation in Bannu District.

==== 31 October ====
- Two soldiers were killed in a grenade attack on a checkpost in Khyber District.

=== November 2024 ===
==== 1 November ====
- Nine people including five school children were killed and 29 others wounded in an explosion targeting a Police van near the Civil Hospital and Girls School Chowk in Mastung.
- Ten alleged separatists were detained from the National University of Modern Language in Rawalpindi.

==== 2 November ====
- A military convoy was attacked in Lakki Marwat District wounding five personnel.
- An explosion took place near a government school in Khyber District.
- 11 soldiers including a captain were wounded in an insurgent ambush in South Waziristan.
- Four militants were killed during a military operation in Bannu District.

==== 3 November ====
- A member of the Peace Committee was killed by insurgents in South Waziristan.
- The residence of the Irrigation Department's Executive Engineer in Turbat was attacked by separatists using a grenade but caused no casualties.
- Three Balochistan Liberation Army separatists were killed and two captured in a Counter Terrorism Department operation in Musakhel District.
- A military checkpoint in Kech District was attacked by separatists.
- Three trucks, two loaded with coal, were hit and set alight by separatists in Duki District.

==== 4 November ====
- An alleged separatist was captured from Kech District.
- 10 soldiers were killed and four others wounded while two Baloch Liberation Army separatists were also killed in a clash in Nushki District.
- An insurgent was killed in a military operation in Nushki District, weapons and ammunition were seized.
- An insurgent was killed in a military operation in North Waziristan.
- Five insurgents were killed and three others wounded during an infiltration attempt across the Pakistan-Afghanistan border in South Waziristan.
- The house of the president of the Bajaur Welfare Association was attacked by insurgents using grenades.
- Three people including a Counter Terrorism Department were killed in an insurgent attack in South Waziristan.

==== 5 November ====
- An alleged separatist was captured from Kech District.
- Two Frontier Constabulary were killed and four more wounded in an insurgent attack on their vehicle in Dera Ismail Khan District.
- Seven soldiers were wounded in an ambush of their convoy in Tirah.
- Balochistan Liberation Front killed a member of the "state-backed death squad" member in Turbat.
- The dead body of a former associate of Hakimullah Mehsud, Maulana Ahmad Jan Kakakhel Wazir, was discovered in South Waziristan.
- Two people were killed and one wounded in a sectarian attack on a public transport vehicle in Kurram District.

==== 6 November ====
- A godown of a trader was attacked by insurgents in Peshawar using grenades.
- Insurgents attacked an under-construction girls' school in Bannu District using grenades.
- Four soldiers were killed and four more wounded in an insurgent raid in South Waziristan.
- Baloch Liberation Army killed two alleged members of the "state-backed death squad" in Nushki District.
- Balochistan Liberation Front launched a grenade attack on a Frontier Corps position in Khuzdar District.

==== 7 November ====
- Five insurgents and four soldiers were killed during a clash in South Waziristan.

==== 8 November ====
- Six insurgents of the Hafiz Gul Bahadar group were killed, and six more wounded during an operation conducted by the military in North Waziristan District, a cache of arms and ammunition was also captured.
- A Balochistan Liberation Army separatist laid down his arms.

==== 9 November ====
- 26 people were killed and 50+ wounded in a suicide blast at the Quetta Railway Station.

==== 10 November ====
- A Frontier Corps personnel was killed and eight wounded in an insurgent attack in Kech District.
- Nine soldiers were killed in two separate attacks conducted by Balochistan Liberation Front in Kech District.
- An alleged separatist was captured from Kharan District.
- An alleged separatist was captured from Dera Bugti District.
- Two insurgents were killed in a military operation in North Waziristan.
- Baloch Liberation Army claimed to have killed a state back "death squads" member.
- Balochistan Liberation Front attacked a construction company in Kharan District and destroyed its machinery and equipment.
- The Mastermind and a female accomplice of the attack on Chinese engineers on 6 October were arrested by Counter Terrorism Department.
- Three Pakistan Coast Guard personnel, were wounded in an attack on a patrol boat in Gwadar District.
- Two soldiers were killed and four wounded in a Balochistan Liberation Front attack on a military checkpoint in Nushki District.
- Two insurgents were killed and two more wounded in an attempted infiltration across the Pakistan-Afghanistan border in North Waziristan.
- Separatists attacked Balochistan Levies personnel and looted ten guns from them in Awaran District.

==== 11 November ====
- A Christian man was killed by insurgents in Khyber District.
- An alleged separatist was captured from Dera Bugti District.
- Two alleged separatists were captured from Kech District.
- Militants assassinated a National Party (NP) leader, Muhammad Akbar Baloch, in Kachhi District.

==== 12 November ====
- A suspect, allegedly involved in the 2023 Peshawar Police Lines Mosque Blast that caused 84 fatalities, was captured.
- Four alleged separatists was captured from Kech District.

==== 13 November ====
- A Policeman was killed by insurgents in Peshawar outside his home.
- Four separatists, including a "high-value target" were killed in a military operation in Kech District.
- Baloch insurgents reportedly blocked Jafri Kaur, Khwari Checkpoint and Chai, along the Coastal Highway between Ormara and Pasni, multiple vehicles transporting minerals were set alight.
- In Ormara, separatists attacked a Levies Force post and a Coast Guard camp seizing weapons and equipment as well as inflicting casualties.
- Separatists blocked roads and attacked vehicles carrying minerals Mastung, Turbat, Kharan, Gwarkop, Hoshap, Dera Bugti, Mashkay, Bolan, Buleda, Zamuran, Hironk, Panjgur, Barkhan, Awaran, Dukki, Kohlu, Tump and Gwadar.

==== 14 November ====
- An alleged separatist was captured from Quetta.
- An alleged separatist was captured from Gwadar.
- A group from Quetta headed by Abu Umar, joined the Tehreek-e-Taliban Pakistan.
- A suicide bomber targeted a Police mobile unit in Charsadda District causing damage but no casualties.
- 13 militants and five civilians were killed as a result of an explosion in a bomb making factory of 'commander' Jihadyar in North Waziristan District.
- Two people were killed and two wounded in an attack on a convoy in Khuzdar District.
- Pakistan Armed Forces launched a large-scale operation in Balochistan, especially in Panjgur District.
- Two alleged separatists were captured from Kech District.
- An alleged separatist was captured from Panjgur District.
- .The General Secretary of the Jamat-e-Islami (JI) in Bajaur was assassinated by ISIS-K.
- Three separatists and two soldiers were killed during a military operation in Harnai District.
- Two alleged separatists were captured from Kharan District.

==== 15 November ====
- The Islamabad Police and Counter Terrorism Department captured three insurgents.

==== 16 November ====
- Seven soldiers and six Baloch Liberation Army separatists were killed and 18 soldiers were wounded in an attack on a military camp in Kalat District.
- Three insurgents including a key commander were captured in Hangu District.

==== 17 November ====
- A JUI-F leader was killed and five others wounded in a blast near a mosque in South Waziristan.
- Six insurgents and one soldier were killed during an attack on a military base in Tirah.
- Insurgents carried out a grenade attack on a cooking center in Orangi and opened indiscriminate fire

==== 18 November ====
- A public school in South Waziristan was damaged by insurgents using RPGs.
- Nine insurgents and eight soldiers were killed during clashes in Tirah, seven soldiers and six insurgents were also wounded.
- Seven Policemen were abducted in an ambush in Bannu District, their weapons and equipment was also seized but the policemen were released the next day.
- An alleged separatist was captured from Panjgur District.
- Two civilians were killed by militants in Khyber District.

==== 19 November ====
- A large-scale military operation was conducted in Nushki District with around 10 APCs being deployed.
- A civilian was killed and two wounded during shelling in South Waziristan.
- A journalist was wounded in an attack in Karachi.
- Four people including a tribal elder were killed and two women injured in an attack in Bannu District.
- A leader of Balochistan National Party was killed in Khuzdar District.
- Twelve soldiers and six insurgents were killed in an attack on a checkpost in Bannu District and 10 other soldiers were wounded, the attack included a suicide attack as well.

==== 20 November ====
- A military convoy was ambushed in Mastung District including an IED attack followed by rocket fire.
- The Swat Division president of Pakistan Zindabad Movement was killed by Tehreek-e-Taliban Pakistan.
- Three seminary students were wounded in a blast at in a religious seminary in Turbat.

==== 21 November ====
- 2024 Kurram massacre: 50+ people were killed and 26+ were wounded.
- Four militants were killed during an infiltration attempt in South Waziristan.
- Eight alleged separatists were captured during a military operation in Nushki District.
- A Separatist was killed during a military operation in Dera Bugti, another was killed in Kech District and two more in Awaran District.

==== 22 November ====
- A Pakistan People's Party worker was killed after prayer in Lakki Marwat District.
- Three insurgents were killed and two wounded in a military operation in Bannu District.

==== 23 November ====
- A Policeman and a civilian were killed in two IED attacks in Bajaur District claimed by ISIS-K.
- Three insurgents were killed during a CTD operation in Rawalpindi.
- Two insurgents were killed during a military operation in Khyber District.

==== 24 November ====
- Five Pakistani Taliban including acommander were killed and two soldiers were wounded during a clash in Miranshah.
- Two alleged spies working for the military were killed by militants in North Waziristan.

==== 25 November ====
- 10 soldiers were killed and six wounded in two IED attacks by BLA in Kalat District.
- Seven people including five policemen were wounded in a militant attack on a Police checkpoint in Dera Ismail Khan District.

==== 26 November ====
- An alleged separatist was captured from Kalat District.
- An alleged separatist was wounded, captured and later died in Turbat.
- A bomb disposal unit personnel was filled and two more wounded as a result of IED attack in South Waziristan.
- Three insurgents were killed during an infiltration attempt across the Pakistan-Afghanistan border in North Waziristan.
- Two soldiers were wounded in a BLF attack on a military patrol in Kech District.
- Two security guards were wounded in a bomb blast near the vehicle of a Commander Nazir Group affiliate.

==== 27 November ====
- Four Tehreek-e-Taliban Pakistan insurgents were killed and three wounded in a military operation in Khyber District.
- Police repelled an insurgent attack by more than 12 militants in Dera Ghazi Khan District.
- Senior journalist and YouTube anchor Matiullah Jan was abducted from Islamabad.

==== 28 November ====
- Two alleged separatists including a policeman were captured from Karachi.
- One Bomb Disposal Squad personnel was killed and two wounded during a blast on duty in Turbat.
- Three soldiers were killed and two wounded in a BLF ambush of a convoy in Kech District.
- Two alleged separatists were captured from Gwadar District.
- Two people were wounded in a grenade attack on a gas station in Jaffarabad District.
- Separatists attacked and blocked a highway in Nushki District and captured a Levies checkpoint along with the weaponry in it.

==== 29 November ====
- Seven insurgents were killed in a military operation in Bannu District employing FPV drones.
- Two mutilated dead bodies of alleged separatists, allegedly killed by military forces were killed in Awaran District.
- Two Pakistan Coast Guards (PCG) personnel were wounded in a grenade attack in Gwadar District.
- A dam construction site was attacked in the Khuzdar District and large number of heavy equipment was destroyed.

==== 30 November ====
- A policeman was wounded in an IED attack in Killa Abdullah District.
- A Punjab Police officer and two civilians were killed in an attack in Lakki Marwat District.
- A Policeman was killed by sniper fire during a raid in Lakki Marwat District.
- The bodies of two alleged separatists detained eight years ago were found in Khuzdar District.
- Separatists attacked the main military base in Mastung.

=== December 2024 ===
==== 1 December ====
- A Captain was killed and two soldiers wounded in an engagement between Mohamand and Khyber Districts.
- A Police officer was killed and two wounded in an attack in Khyber District.
- Five insurgents and a soldier were killed while nine insurgents were wounded in a military operation in Bannu District.
- Four insurgents were killed and two Policemen wounded in a skirmish in Mianwali District.
- The paternal cousin of the Chief Minister of Khyber Pakhtunkhwa, Ali Amin Gandapur was assassinated by insurgents in Dera Ismail Khan District.
- CTD Punjab claimed to have captured 34 militants during 242 operations across multiple cities.
- Three insurgents and a soldier were killed and two insurgents were also captured during a military operation in Khyber District.

==== 2 December ====
- Three children died as a result of a stray mortar explosion.
- An alleged separatist was captured from Kech District.
- Three alleged separatists was captured from Dera Bugti District.
- A major separatists attack was thwarted in Gwadar by military forces who conducted a raid and captured weaponry and explosives.
- Two military personnel were wounded in an attack on a military base in Nushki.

==== 3 December ====
- Two dead bodies of alleged persons were discovered in Balochistan.

==== 4 December ====
- Five insurgents were killed and two more wounded in a military operation in Lakki Marwat District.
- The vehicle of a senior Levies personnel was damaged by an IED attack in Kila Abdullah District.

==== 5 December ====
- A CTD personnel was wounded in an insurgent attack in Khuzdar.
- An alleged separatist was captured from Gwadar.
- Two insurgents were killed during a military operation in South Waziristan District.

==== 7 December ====
- Six people were killed and five border guards wounded in a major attack by 35 insurgents on a border post in Hangu-North Waziristan border region.
- Six insurgents were killed and eight wounded in a military operation in Tank District.
- 22 insurgents and six soldiers were killed in three engagements across KP.
- Two alleged separatists are captured from Balochistan.

==== 8 December ====
- A soldier was killed by Sniper Tactical Team of BLF in Awaran District.
- 13 insurgents were killed and several more wounded in coordinated military strikes near the border in North Waziristan.
- An alleged separatist was captured during a raid in Nasirabad District.
- An alleged separatist was captured from Hub District.
- A soldier was assassinated by insurgents in Karachi.

==== 9 December ====
- Two people were killed in an explosion targeting Civil Hospital of Qilla Abdullah.
- Two alleged separatists were captured from Mastung District.
- Two soldiers were killed and four wounded in a BLA rocket and heavy arms attack in Kohlu District.
- Two insurgents and one policeman were killed in an engagement in Bannu District.
- Two insurgents were killed and one was captured during a military operation in Dera Ismail Khan District.
- Two separatists were killed as a result of an accidental detonation while installing an explosive in Chaman.

==== 10 December ====
- 15 separatists and one soldier were killed during a military operation in Zhob District.
- BLF attacked and destroyed several gas tankers in Washuk District.
- Three alleged separatists were captured during a raid in Turbat.

==== 11 December ====
- Four insurgents were killed during a military operation (IBO) in North Waziristan.
- Three insurgents and a soldier were killed during an engagement in North Waziristan.
- Two soldiers were killed while three wounded in a BLA ambush in Gwadar District.

==== 12 December ====
- Coal loaded trucks were targeted in Duki District using bombs but caused no damage.
- A journalist was assassinated by insurgents in Bahawalpur District.
- A police vehicles was targeted by an IED in Rajanpur District destroying it.
- An SHO was killed by insurgents in Swat District.
- Six insurgents were killed in a military operation in Lakki Marwat District.
- Pakistan Armed Forces conducted separate operations in Musa Khel District and Panjgur District killing 10 separatists.
- Two Policemen were wounded in grenade attack on a police vehicle in Dera Ghazi Khan District.

==== 13 December ====
- A politician of the National Party was killed by militants in Balochistan.
- Two policemen were wounded in a small arms attack on a check post in Khyber District.

==== 15 December ====
- Two insurgents including a high ranking commander were killed and four soldiers were wounded in a military operation in Tirah.

==== 16 December ====
- A policeman was killed and a polio vaccination worker wounded during an attack in Karak District.
- Three Tehreek-e-Taliban Pakistan insurgents were captured during a joint operation by Sindh Rangers and the Counter Terrorism Department in Karachi.
- Two Policemen were killed while two other wounded in a militant attack on a post in Shangla District.

==== 17 December ====
- Three soldiers were killed and three wounded in an IED attack on a military vehicle working for security of a polio vaccination team in Dera Ismail Khan District.
- Two insurgents were killed in an attack on a polio vaccination team in Dera Ghazi Khan District.
- Two insurgents were killed in a military operation in North Waziristan District with weapons and ammunition being captured.
- Two insurgents were killed in a military operation in Mohmand District with weapons and ammunition being captured.

==== 18 December ====
- A civilian was killed and another wounded in an IED attack in Kohlu District.
- Seven insurgents were killed in a military operation in North Waziristan District with weapons and ammunition being captured.

==== 19 December ====
- BLA assassinated two alleged military informants, one in Quetta and another in Nushki.

==== 20 December ====
- 16 soldiers and eight insurgents were killed during a nighttime raid on a military post in South Waziristan.
- Four insurgents and a soldier was killed during an across the Pak-Afghan border in Khyber District.
- Eight soldiers and a Major were killed and several more personnel were wounded in a Separatist ambush in Kharan District.
- A separatist was killed and three soldiers were wounded in a military operation in Kharan District.
- Two local Lashkar militiamen were wounded while supporting the military forces in repelling an insurgent attack in Bajaur District.

==== 21 December ====
- A militant attack on a checkpost in Makeen in South Waziristan killed 16 Pakistani soldiers.

==== 23 December ====
- A construction vehicle of CPEC, was targeted in an IED attack in Awaran District.
- Ahmadzai chieftain Malik Tariq Wazir was captured by insurgents from South Waziristan District.
- A relief emergency was imposed in Kurram District.
- Three policemen were wounded in a grenade attack in Tank District.

==== 24 December ====
- Two civilians were wounded in a grenade attack on a barber shop in Quetta.

==== 25 December ====
- 46 people were killed and 6 wounded in Pakistani Airstrikes on Afghanistan.
- The gas pipeline near Western Bypass in Quetta was blown up by separatists causing LPG supply disruption throughout Balochistan.
- 13 insurgents were killed in military operations in South Waziristan District.
- A policeman was killed in an insurgent attack on a police station in Bannu District.
- An alleged separatist was captured from Kech District.
- Two Frontier Corps personnel were killed and four wounded in an IED attack in Kech District.
- Two policemen were killed in a Sindhudeshi separatist attack in Shikarpur District.

==== 26 December ====
- Afghanistan and Pakistani forces heavily skirmished on the Dande Pattan-Kurram Border but no casualties or damages were reported.
- Five insurgents and an Army Major were killed and eight insurgents were wounded in a military operation in North Waziristan District while six more insurgents were killed and an additional eight insurgents were wounded in an operation in South Waziristan District.
- Two insurgents were killed in a military operation in Bannu District.

==== 27 December ====
- Two soldiers were killed and Eleven were wounded in clashes in Bajaur District.

==== 28 December ====
- A Frontier Constabulary soldier was killed and Eleven were wounded during skirmishes with Afghan forces while fifteen afghan soldiers were also killed in skirmishes.
- An attack on an FC post was foiled in South Waziristan.
- Two soldiers and "large number" of insurgents were killed in clashes in Bajaur District.
- Two soldiers were wounded in a BLF ambush in Kech District.
- Two insurgents were killed in a clash with Patrol police in Bannu.

==== 29 December ====
- A suicide bomber exploded his vehicle in Tank District wounding three FC personnel.
- An alleged separatist was captured from Hub District.
- Seven insurgents were killed in an attack on the Purtagai post in South Waziristan.
- Three coast guards were wounded in an IED attack and one more in a vehicle bombing in Gwadar District.
- Three insurgents and a soldier were killed and 25 soldiers were wounded in a border raid in South Waziristan.

==== 30 December ====
- BLF claimed to have killed three soldiers in a siege of their positions in Kech District.
- Five soldiers were killed in a BLA IED attack in Kech District.
- Five soldiers were killed in an ambush by BLF in Awaran District.
- Pakistani Taliban published a video of capturing a border post in Bajaur District, with military sources claiming that the post had been abandoned and soldiers had already been relocated to a newly built more fortified position.
- BLA attacked soldiers and local pro-government tribal militiamen while they were conducting an operation in Mastung District.
- Two people were killed by Separatists in Ziarat District.

==== 31 December ====
- A child was killed and four people wounded in a blast at the Benazir Income Support Programme office in South Waziristan District.
- A policeman and a civilian were killed while two civilians were wounded in an attack on a police Post in Dera Ismail Khan District.
- Five Policemen were wounded in a roadside explosion in Bannu District targeting a police Vehicle.

=== January 2025 ===
==== 1 January 2025 ====
- One person was wounded in an IED attack on Oil and Gas Development Corporation Limited Company's vehicle in Killa Saifullah District.
- A soldier was killed and another wounded in an IED attack in North Waziristan District.
- The MPA of Khyber Pakhtunkhwa Provincial Assembly, Anwar Zaib Khan claimed that afghan forces had captured 15 security check posts in Bajaur district.
- Insurgents infiltrated the house of a military officer and blew up his room in Lakki Marwat District.

==== 2 January ====
- An alleged separatist was captured from Gwadar District.

==== 3 January ====
- Three soldiers were captured by insurgents that had set up a checkpoint in Lakki Marwat District.
- A Police Station in the I-9 area of Islamabad Capital Territory was attacked by a 'mini-rocket' launched by Pakistani Taliban.
- Two alleged separatists were captured from Nushki District.
- Two alleged separatists were captured from Kech District.
- A Policeman was killed by insurgent fire in Bannu District.

==== 4 January ====
- A joint clean-up operation was launched in the mountains of Karak District against insurgents.
- CTD captured two insurgents from the Jamshoro District.
- Eleven Frontier Corps personnel were killed in a suicide attack on a convoy in Turbat.
- The Deputy Commissioner of Kurram District, Javed Allah Mehsud and two security personnel were wounded in a relief convoy going to Parachinar.

==== 5 January ====
- Two alleged separatists were captured from Dera Bugti District.

==== 6 January ====
- A young girl was killed and several civilians were wounded in an alleged accidental fire by military on passenger vehicles in Chagai District.
- Two policemen were killed by insurgents in Lakki Marwat District.
- Two soldiers were wounded in an insurgent attack on Bannu Airport, which was forced to halt its operation.
- Five soldiers were killed and several wounded in an IED attack on a military convoy in Kech District.
- The Assistant Commissioner of Zehri survived an IED attack.
- Three players were wounded as a result of a rocket attack by Afghan forces during a football match in North Waziristan District.

==== 7 January ====
- A Levies personnel was killed by separatists in Panjgur District.
- Afghan forces conducted a mortar attack on Mohmand District.
- Two insurgents were killed in three airstrikes targeting insurgent hideouts in Hassankhel area of Peshawar District.
- Eight insurgents were killed in a military operation in Mohmand District and eight more insurgents were killed in a separate operation in Peshawar District.
- A civilian was killed and a policeman was wounded in a Separatist attack in Quetta.
- Two insurgents involved in the attack on Kurram DC were captured.
- Three soldiers and three insurgents were killed in an engagement at an insurgent holdout in Karak District.

==== 8 January ====
- Infantry patrolling Kech District was targeted by a bomb attack causing fatalities.
- A CTD personnel was killed by insurgents in North Waziristan District.
- Baloch Republican Guards attacked a military checkpoint in Sibi District with small and heavy weaponry.
- Four alleged separatists were captured from Kech District.
- A soldier was killed and another wounded in an insurgent attack in Dera Ismail Khan District.
- BLA launched an attack on Zehri capturing it for a short while before being forced to retreat after destroying multiple Government buildings.
- Bomb Disposal Unit neutralised a 25 kg bomb in Tank District
- A key henchman of Dani Pathan was captured from Lyari.
- Two alleged separatists were captured from Kech District.
- Two alleged separatists were captured from Kharan District.

==== 9 January ====
- Separatists blocked highway in Kachhi District, seized weaponry from Levies personnel and destroyed machinery at a cement factory.
- 17 civilian construction workers were abducted by Pakistani Taliban in Lakki Marwat District.
- Three alleged separatists were captured from Khuzdar District.
- Three TTP insurgents were killed during a joint operation by the CTD and Police.

==== 10 January ====
- An Afghan Taliban soldier was killed and two others wounded when a Pakistani mortar hit an afghan bunker during skirmishes between both sides.
- Five insurgents were killed during a military operation in Dera Ismail Khan.
- Three civilians were wounded in an IED attack targeting a Frontier Corps truck in Chaman.

==== 11 January ====
- A soldier was killed in an IED attack on a military water tanker in North Waziristan District.
- Four insurgents were killed in a military operation in North Waziristan District.
- A pro government 'death squads' militiaman was killed was shot dead and another wounded in an attempted dual assassination in Balochistan.
- A soldier was killed by a BLF sniper attack outside a military outpost in Kech District.
- Separatists attacked three cargo trucks in Nushki District, destroying one and damaging two.
- Two soldiers were wounded in a BLA ambush in Mastung District.
- An Afghan Taliban was killed in a raid in Zhob District.
- Six insurgents and two soldiers were killed in a clash in North Waziristan District.
- Separatists attacked a pro government 'death squads' camp in Kohlu District.

==== 12 January ====
- A Levies personnel was killed by insurgents in Gwadar.
- A major Hafiz Gul Bahadur group faction pledged allegiance to TTP.
- Two insurgents were killed and two wounded in a military operation in North Waziristan District.
- 27 insurgents were killed in a covert military operation in Kachhi District
- Six insurgents were killed and two captured during a separate operation in North Waziristan District.

==== 13 January ====
- Six insurgents were killed during an operation in Tank District and two more in Tirah.

==== 14 January ====
- A soldier was killed and another wounded in a BLF raid in Awaran District.
- Four soldiers were killed and two more were wounded in a BLF attack on a military post protecting FWO personnel in Awaran District and also struck FWO headquarters.
- Four insurgents were killed in a military operation in North Waziristan.
- A Baloch separatist group pledged allegiance to TTP.

==== 15 January ====
- 23 insurgents were captured by CTD during raids throughout Punjab.
- A baloch separatist group from Mastung District pledged allegiance to TTP.
- An alleged separatist was captured from Quetta.
- Seven personnel including an officer and their vehicle destroyed in a high intensity IED attack in Kech District.
- Two alleged separatists were captured during raids in Balochistan.

==== 16 January ====
- An FC official was kidnapped by insurgents in Lakki Marwat District.
- A policeman was killed by insurgents in Lakki Marwat District.
- A soldier and six insurgents were killed during skirmishes as insurgents raided an aid convoy in Kurram District, in total there were 10 fatalities.
- Separatists conducted twin bombings and raids targeting military personnel in Kalat District.
- Multiple homes of Frontier Constabulary personnel were destroyed by insurgents in Dera Ismail Khan District.
- Two Policemen were wounded in an attack on a police post in Shangla District.

==== 17 January ====
- BLF attacked a Police post in Turbat seizing weaponry and destroying the post.
- BLF snipers killed a soldier in Kech District.
- Five insurgents were killed in a military operation in Tirah.
- Two soldiers were wounded in a BLF attack on a military checkpost in Kech District

==== 18 January ====
- Separatists attacked a Levies checkpoint in Kachhi District seizing weapons and supplies.

==== 19 January ====
- BLA killed an alleged government spy in Turbat.
- Separatists attacked Turbat University taking the guardian Police personnel hostage and seizing six weapons.
- Five insurgents were killed in an attempted infiltration attempt across the border in Zhob District.
- Two soldiers were killed in an IED attack on a military vehicle in Kech District.

==== 20 January ====
- A sanitisation operation was initiated in four UCs of Kurram District.
- A worker of the Oil and Gas Development Corporation Limited was killed and another wounded in an IED attack on their vehicle in Qila Saifullah District.
- 22 rehabilitated insurgents were handed over to the Lakki Marwat Qaumi Jirga.
- Two Policemen were killed and three wounded in an IED attack on their vehicle in Kashmore.
- Two insurgents were killed and a soldier wounded in a clash in Dera Ismail Khan District.

==== 22 January ====
- A civilian was wounded in an insurgent attack in Bajaur District.
- A Shia mosque was damaged in an insurgent bombing and gun attack in Dera Ismail Khan District.
- The Kurram operation ended with the government forces capturing insurgent positions and weapon caches.
- Two policemen were wounded in a grenade attack on their post in Peshawar.
- Separatists destroyed three mineral carrying vehicles in Nushki District.
- Separatists destroyed a Levies post and confiscated weaponry in Panjgur District.

==== 23 January ====
- An off duty FC trooper was assassinated in Lakki Marwat District.
- A social media activist was kidnapped from Quetta.
- Insurgents captured four policemen from South Waziristan District.
- Six insurgents were killed during an attempted infiltration across the border in Zhob District.
- Separatists attacked a joint Police and customs post in Gwadar District seizing weaponry and vehicles.

==== 24 January ====
- Four BLA separatists including two 'commanders' surrendered to authorities in Quetta.

==== 25 January ====
- 18 insurgents were killed and six others wounded in a military operation in Lakki Marwat District.
- Six insurgents were killed in a military operation in Karak District.
- Four insurgents including two commanders were killed and two more wounded in a military operation in Waziristan.
- The body of a Pakistan Atomic Energy Commission worker was recovered from Lakki Marwat District.

==== 26 January ====
- A civilian was killed by soldiers in Washuk District.
- A bus was struck by a high intensity IED near Khuzdar killing two intelligence personnel.
- A JUI-F politician was assassinated in Peshawar.
- An alleged separatist was captured from Turbat.
- An insurgent attack on a border post was repulsed by military forces in North Waziristan.
- Six insurgents and two soldiers were killed in a clash in North Waziristan District after insurgents attempted an assault on a military position.
- Separatists blocked the N-85 highway and killed an ethnic Punjabi in Kech District.

==== 27 January ====
- A Frontier Constabulary personnel was killed and four others wounded in an insurgent assault on Baran Dam of Bannu District.
- Five separatists including two suicide bombers and two soldiers were killed in a skirmish following an infiltration attempt at the Gulistan fort in Kila Abdullah District and two more were killed during a second such attempt later at night.
- Insurgents killed a policeman and two civilians in a drive by attack in Khyber District.
- Three insurgents were killed in a military operation in Bannu District.
- Two Wazir tribal elders were assassinated in two separate attacks in Dera Ismail Khan District.
- Insurgents attacked a convoy of oil tankers in Kurram District but failed to cause damage.

==== 28 January ====
- Baloch Liberation Army killed a local pro-gov militiaman in Kech District.
- Three soldiers were killed and four were wounded in a Baloch Liberation Army attack on a military post in Nushki District.
- Two Coast Guards were wounded in a BLF attack on a Coast Guard camp in Gwadar District.
- Two soldiers were killed and one was wounded in a BLF ambush of a military convoy in Awaran District.
- Two soldiers were wounded in an IED attack in Lakki Marwat District.

==== 29 January ====
- BLF attacked a Police checkpoint in Karachi claiming to have inflicted casualties.
- BLF mortar struck using A-1 shells at a military camp in Kech District.

==== 30 January ====
- An IED was discovered below a bridge and was neutralised in Lakki Marwat District.
- Insurgents killed a policeman in Lakki Marwat District.
- Separatists assassinated a policeman in Quetta.
- Three insurgents were killed in an operation in Dera Ismail District.
- Seven insurgents and two soldiers including a major were killed during a clash following a failed ambush in North Waziristan District. Six more insurgents and two more soldiers were killed in a separate clash in North Waziristan.
- BLA executed an alleged ISI agent in Kalat District and a militiaman in Nushki District.
- Insurgents kidnapped the president of "Tirah traders" association and other tribesmen.

==== 31 January ====
- A civilian was killed and a policeman was severely wounded in a sniper attack on a bunker in Kurram District.
- 18 paramilitary personnel and 12 insurgents were killed during a clearance operation in Mangochar.
- AC and two Policemen were wounded in an attack as the commissioner was going for negotiations to stop firing between Shia and Sunni tribesmen in Kurram.
- The son of the deputy governor of Badghis province (Afghanistan) and three more insurgents were killed in a military raid in Dera Ismail Khan District.

=== February 2025 ===
==== 1 February ====
- Three Balochistan Levies were killed in an attack in Dera Ismail Khan District.
- BLA intercepted a military supply convoy in Kech District.
- BLA killed an alleged government collaborator in Kech District.
- BRG destroyed construction equipment in Kachhi District.
- BLA attacked a Police checkpoint near a high school in Kalat claiming to have killed police personnel.
- BLA killed two soldiers with sniper fire and then launched A-1 grenade attacks on their checkpoint in Turbat.
- Insurgents captured three FC personnel from Tank District.
- Separatists attacked a school principal's house in Turbat with grenades and firearms.

==== 2 February ====
- An abducted PAEC contractor was released by insurgents.
- Separatists attacked a construction site in Kharan District.

==== 3 February ====
- An alleged separatist was captured from Pasni.
- An FC personnel was killed during an insurgent attack in Mohmand District.
- A policeman working for the protection of anti-polio vaccination program was killed by insurgents in Khyber District.
- A mosque imam was killed by insurgents in Lakki Marwat District.
- A Pakistani Taliban was beaten to death in a mosque by locals in Lakki Marwat District while attempting to kidnap an FC soldier.
- A soldier was killed and two were wounded in a BLA ambush on a CPEC route.
- Assistant Superintendent of Quetta Prison was assassinated by separatists in Quetta.
- Three Policemen were captured by insurgents in South Waziristan.
- Three soldiers were killed in an IED attack on a CPEC route in Kech District.

==== 4 February ====
- A professor was killed by separatists in Turbat.
- Five soldiers were killed and six were wounded in an insurgent attack in North Waziristan District.

==== 5 February ====
- 12 insurgents and one soldier were killed in a military operation in North Waziristan District.
- Two policemen were killed and six were wounded in an insurgent attack in Karak District.
- A soldier was killed in a BLF sniper attack on a military position in Kech District.
- BLF launched a grenade attack on the DC Complex in Mastung.
- Police repelled an insurgent attack on a Police Station in Bannu district.
- Insurgents attacked a police escort for polio vaccination team in Karak District resulting in casualties on both sides

==== 6 February ====
- Separatists conducted a grenade attack near Mastung Cadet College.
- An alleged separatist was captured from Hub District and another from Karachi.
- Security Forces conducted a raid in Chaman District seizing a weapons cache.
- Three insurgents were killed in a military operation in North Waziristan District.
- Separatists attacked a construction site in Khuzdar District destroying equipment.
- A civilian was killed by unknown people in Quetta.

==== 7 February ====
- 13 soldiers and one BLA separatist were killed and four soldiers were wounded in a clash in Nushki District.
- Two policemen were killed and three more wounded in an insurgent attack in Bannu District.
- BLF blocked roads in Kech District and initiated patrols before being forced to withdraw.

==== 8 February ====
- A soldier was killed and three were wounded in a clash with insurgents in Peshawar.
- Two local militiamen and three insurgents were killed and many more were wounded in clahses.
- A soldier was killed and two were wounded in a BLF attack on a military camp in Kech District.
- Two alleged separatists were captured from Dera Bugti District.
- Four insurgents were killed and three wounded in a military operation in North Waziristan District.
- Three insurgents were killed and two were wounded in a military operation in Dera Ismail Khan District.
- CTD Punjab captured 15 insurgents during 143 raids all across Punjab.
- Two soldiers were wounded in an insurgent attack in Tirah.

==== 9 February ====
- Insurgents executed three policemen in Bannu District while filming their execution for propaganda purposes.
- Two soldiers were killed and three were wounded in a BLA attack on a military post in Kharan District.

==== 10 February ====
- Five soldiers were killed and several wounded in an IED attack and a raid on coast guard in Pishni District.
- Four insurgents including three Afghan Taliban were killed in airstrikes in North Waziristan District.
- A police patrol was unsuccessfully attacked by an IED in Lakki Marwat District.
- Five Pakistani Taliban were killed in a military operation in Karak District.
- BLA attacked military supply vehicles in Panjgur District.
- Two Hindus were killed by unknown assailants in Kech District.
- Separatists blocked NH65 highway and kidnapped a civilian in Bolan District, but were forced to withdraw following skirmishes with security forces.

==== 11 February ====
- Eleven alleged separatists were captured from Pasni.
- Four soldiers were killed and two were wounded in a BLF rocket attack in Pir Ghaib.
- A soldier was killed and three were wounded in a BLF rocket attack on a military camp in Kharan.
- A school principal survived an assassination attempt in Turbat.
- An alleged separatist was captured from Gwadar District.
- Five alleged separatists were captured from Dera Bugti District.
- Seven soldiers were killed and four were wounded in a BLA ambush in Kech District.
- BLF raided two Levies checkposts in Awaran District and Panjgur District seizing weaponry.
- Dead body of an alleged separatist was discovered in Panjgur District.
- Two policemen were wounded in a BLF attack on the Police Training College in Quetta.

==== 12 February ====
- A soldier was wounded by BLA in Mastung District while on way to the military base.
- Five insurgents were killed in projectile and drone strikes in Dera Ismail Khan District.
- Four alleged separatists were captured from Kech District.
- Six soldiers were killed in an IED attack in Gwadar District.
- BLF destroyed a construction truck in Gwadar District.
- Two insurgents were wounded in helicopter strikes in Peshawar District.
- Insurgents destroyed the house of a PAF personnel in Lakki Marwat District.

==== 13 February ====
- A policeman was wounded in an insurgent drive by attack in Khyber District.
- Five insurgents including 'commander' Shah Gul alias Rohani were killed during a military operation in Dera Ismail Khan District.
- Five insurgents were killed in a military operation in North Waziristan District.
- An insurgent was killed in as skirmish in Khyber District.
- An alleged separatist was captured from Kech District.
- Two insurgents were killed during a military operation in Lakki Marwat District.
- Insurgents captured two Pakistan Customs officials and the president of a local Chamber of Commerce in South Waziristan District during a raid.

==== 14 February ====
- Eleven mine workers were killed and five were wounded in an IED attack in Harnai District.
- Houses of two FC personnel were destroyed by insurgents in Tank District.
- Two soldiers were wounded in an IED attack in Bannu District.
- A NADRA office was destroyed by separatists in Panjgur District.
- A local militia convoy was ambushed in Mastung District.

==== 15 February ====
- A religious scholar was assassinated in Mastung District.
- Nine insurgents were killed in a military operation in Dera Ismail Khan District including the newly appointed Shadow Governor of the TTP, Saqib Gandapur.
- Six insurgents and four soldiers were killed in a military operation in North Waziristan District.
- A policeman was killed in an insurgent attack in Karachi.
- Three Frontier Corps soldiers were killed and six were wounded in a BLF attack on their positions in Kech District.
- Sindhudesh Revolutionary Army attacked tankers of the National Logistics Cell in Ghotki District.
- Two alleged separatists were captured from Panjgur District. of
- Two levies were killed and two more were wounded in a separatist attack on their checkpoint in Kalat District.
- Separatists raided a Police Station in Awaran District seizing weaponry.

==== 16 February ====
- A Baloch civilian was killed by pro government militiamen in Kech District.
- A commander of the Hafuz Gul Bahadar group was killed in a drone strike in South Waziristan.
- A policeman was killed during an insurgent attack on a police post in South Waziristan.
- Separatists seized police weaponry in Awaran District.
- A senior commander of the Jamaat-ul-Ahrar, Sarbakaf Mohmand was wounded as his vehicle was intercepted at the Pak-Afghan border.
- BLF attacked a military camp in Mashkay District using rocket launchers and heavy weaponry.
- An Ahl-i Hadith scholar was killed in Swabi District.
- A soldier was killed and two were wounded in a BLF attack on a military camp in Awaran District.
- Five alleged separatists including four brothers were captured from Gwadar District.
- BLF conducted grenade attacks at the Degree College checkpoint in Quetta.
- BLA conducted grenade attack on military positions in the Brewery area of Quetta.
- There was an engagement between Pakistan and Afghanistan border forces on Torkham border crossing from both sides, firing on both sides started between Khyber District and the corresponding Nangarhar province as well as Mohmand District and the corresponding Kunar province, officials on both sides confirmed no casualties.
- Separatists set a Levies checkpost alight in Kohlu District.

==== 17 January ====
- An alleged separatist was captured from the Quetta International Airport.
- A policeman was killed by insurgents in Khyber District.
- A tribal elder was killed by an IED in Bajaur District.
- Two soldiers were killed and six were wounded in an attack on a bridge in Dera Ismail Khan District.
- BLF conducted three attacks allegedly killing 13 soldiers and wounding 7 in Makshay District.
- Four soldiers were killed and five wounded in an insurgent ambush of a joint Commandant Kurram Militia and Frontier Corps convoy in Kurram District. Nine civilians were also killed as the aid caravan being escorted also came under attack.
- 30 insurgents were killed in a military operation in South Waziristan.
- Three alleged separatists were captured from Gwadar District.
- Two FC soldiers were killed and seven were wounded in a Separatist ambush in Mashkay District.
- Unknown militants killed a civilian in Panjgur District and another in Mastung District.

==== 18 February ====
- Seven Punjabi civilians were selectively off loaded from a bus and killed in Barkhan District by separatists.
- Four insurgents were killed and one policeman was wounded during an engagement near the Indus River in Kohat District.
- BLA attacked a FWO site in Kech District destroying four pieces of construction equipment.
- Two Pakistani soldiers were killed in a skirmish with Afghan Taliban forces in Mohmand District.

==== 19 February ====
- An alleged separatist who was a minor was captured from Gwadar District.
- An alleged separatist was captured from Kech District and three more from Quetta.
- ISIS-K killed a Policeman deployed for security of polio vaccination teams in Bajaur District.
- Two civilians were killed and three were wounded in a Separatist attack in Panjgur District.
- BLF attacked a military post in Gwadar wounding two soldiers.
- BLF attacked a military post in Turbat wounding two soldiers.

==== 20 February ====
- A Bajaur scouts was killed in an insurgent attack on a road blockade in Bajaur District.
- A soldier was wounded during skirmishes with Afghan forces on the Ghakhi Pass border post in Bajaur District.
- An ASI was assassinated by insurgents in Peshawar.
- Four alleged separatists were captured from Barkhan District.
- A Separatist was killed while installing explosives in Quetta.
- A soldier was killed by BLF snipers outside a military camp in Awaran District.
- Two Policemen were killed and one was wounded in a Separatist attack on a police checkpost in Quetta.
- Insurgents attacked a police post in Bannu District with heavy weapons but failed to inflict casualties.

==== 21 February ====
- A child was wounded in crossfire as local militiamen attacked an alleged separatist.
- A Sindhi man was killed in Kharan.
- A tribal elder was assassinated in South Waziristan.
- An alleged separatist was captured from Quetta.
- Six Pakistani Taliban insurgents were killed in a military operation in Karak District.

==== 22 February ====
- A civilian was wounded in a Separatist attack at Turbat Dam.
- Police discovered a bullet ridden body in Naseerabad District.
- An alleged separatist was captured from Quetta.
- An alleged separatist was captured en route to Karachi.
- An alleged separatist was captured from Barkhan District.
- Separatists fired unguided bombs were fired into the Red Zone area of Kharan, two of which landed into an open area of the commissioner house with one exploding.
- An alleged separatist was captured from Kech District.
- Two embroiderers were killed in a Separatist attack on a barber shop in Turbat.
- A civilian was killed by separatists in Panjgur District.

==== 23 February ====
- Four separatists and two civilians were killed as they set up roadblocks on NH-65 highway in Bolan District.
- BLA launched a grenade attack at military camp in Turbat.
- 10 insurgents were killed in a military operation in Khyber District.
- Seven insurgents were killed in two operations in Dera Ismail Khan District.

==== 24 February ====
- Eight people including six soldiers were wounded in a bomb blast targeting a security convoy for a copper project in Kalat District.
- Four soldiers were killed and two were wounded in an insurgent attack in North Waziristan.
- An alleged separatist was captured from Karachi.
- The Divisional President of the Pakistan People's Party, Qaizar Khan along with his entourage were abducted by insurgents in Dera Ismail Khan District.
- Insurgents conducted an FPV drone attack on a military position in South Waziristan causing minor damage.

==== 25 February ====
- A veteran Lieutenant Colonel was wounded in a Separatist attack in Quetta.
- Police foiled an insurgent attack in Karak District.
- 20 insurgents were captured from Kurram District and further clearing operations were being carried out in Ochat, Bagan, Mandori, and surrounding areas.
- An IED planted by insurgents in Bannu was neutralised.
- Two alleged separatists were captured from Balochistan.

==== 26 February ====
- An alleged separatist was captured from Lyari.
- Separatists attacked the residence of a famous local singer in Turbat.

==== 28 February ====
- A civilian was killed and Three were wounded in an IED attack at a medical store in Orakzai District.
- 2025 Darul Uloom Haqqania bombing
- BLF attacked a construction site in Kharan District destroying equipment.
- Six insurgents were killed in a military operation in North Waziristan.
- Ten people including an FC soldier were wounded in a bomb blast in Quetta.
- Three policemen were wounded in a grenade attack on a police station in Karachi.
- Three soldiers were wounded when BLA attacked the Army's main camp in Panjgur District.
- Two soldiers were wounded in a BLF attack on a military checkpoint in Turbat.

=== March 2025 ===
==== 1 March ====
- An insurgent was killed and a Policeman was wounded in a clash in Lakki Marwat District.
- Two leaders of Jamiat Ulema-e-Islam-Fazl were assassinated by insurgents in Khuzdar District.
- Sindh Rangers and CTD captured a high-profile insurgent Zubair Ahmed alias Zubair from Karachi.
- Two soldiers were killed in a suicide VBIED attack on a military convoy in North Waziristan District, eight soldiers and two civilians were also wounded.

==== 2 March ====
- A policeman was killed by insurgents in Lahore.
- 13 insurgents and four soldiers were killed while 13 soldiers were wounded in a coordinated series of attacks in military posts in North Waziristan.
- BLF attacked a construction site in Awaran District destroying equipment.
- A soldiers dead body was recovered from Bannu District.
- Commander of the "Quick Response Force" local militia was killed by Pakistani Taliban in Bajaur District.

==== 3 March ====
- An FC soldier was killed and four were wounded in a female suicide bombing in Balochistan.
- Eight people, including six Pakistani soldiers were wounded in fire exchanges at the Torkham border crossing in Khyber District forcing civilians to evacuate.
- Four alleged separatists were found dead in Awaran District.
- Two alleged separatists from Bolan District were captured.
- An alleged separatist was captured from Gwadar.
- Separatists attacked and destroyed a military truck in Barkhan District.
- Separatists blocked highway and destroyed LPG carrying vehicles in Pasni.

==== 4 March ====
- 16 insurgents, five soldiers and 15 civilians were killed and 25 civilians were wounded in a major foiled insurgent attack on Bannu Cantonment.
- Two alleged separatists were captured from Awaran District.
- Two Drivers were wounded in Sindhudesh Revolutionary Army attack on National Logistics vehicles in Sujawal District.

==== 5 March ====
- An alleged separatist was captured from Turbat.
- Four people were killed and five were wounded in a Separatist attack on local Death Squad militia vehicles in Khuzdar District.
- An Intelligence Bureau was killed by insurgents in Peshawar.
- Three Afghan journalists side and a Pakistani custom agent were wounded as result of skirmishes at the Torkham-Jalalabad border.
- Two Afghan insurgents were captured during a military operation in Pishin District.

==== 6 March ====
- An alleged separatist was captured from Islamabad.
- Pakistan rises to second in the Global Terrorism Index 2025.

==== 7 March ====
- A religious cleric was killed during prayers in Kech District.
- Two soldiers were killed and two were wounded in an IED attack on their vehicle in Bajaur District.
- Insurgents killed a policeman and a civilian in an attack near a police station in Peshawar.

==== 8 March ====
- Three insurgents were killed in a military operation in Tank District.

==== 10 March ====
- A Jamat-e-Islami politician was assassinated in Peshawar.
- Four insurgents and three soldiers were killed in skirmishes in Lakki Marwat District.
- Five insurgents including two commanders were killed and three more were wounded in airstrikes targeting insurgent hideouts in North Waziristan.
- A previously captured alleged separatist was found dead at Goldsmith Line border in Panjgur District.
- Seven Frontier Corps soldiers were killed in an IED attack by BLF in Kech District.
- Three Sindhi civilians were killed by separatists in Panjgur District.
- Two Counter Terrorism Department were killed by insurgents in Kohat District.
- Two policemen were killed by insurgents in Bajaur District.
- Separatists attacked a police station in Khuzdar District temporarily holding policemen hostage and seizing weaponry.
- Separatists attacked a levies checkpoint in Khuzdar District and seized weaponry and vehicles.
- Separatists attacked a police patrol vehicle in Gwadar District and seized the vehicle along with weaponry.
- Separatists attacked a police checkpost in Mastung District, seizing weaponry and equipment of special police forces.

==== 11 March ====
- 2025 Jaffar Express Train Hijacking
- An alleged separatist was allegedly killed by death Squad militiamen in Kech District.
- A previously captured alleged separatist was found dead from Kech District.

==== 12 March ====
- Separatists attacked a Levies checkpost in Kalat District, seizing weaponry and equipment and wounding a Levies personnel.
- A levies personnel was wounded while thwarting a grenade attack I'm Kalat District.
- Separatists attacked a Police post in Panjgur District, overwhelming the personnel and seizing weaponry and equipment.

==== 13 March ====
- Separatists attacked a construction company in Khuzdar District destroying vehicles and equipment.
- Separatists attacked the Manjho Dam in Bolan District, kidnapping seven workers, destroying a dumper and damaging two vehicles.
- Separatists conducted a grenade attack on a police Station in Quetta destroying vehicles.
- Separatists attacked a customs checkpost in Panjgur District, holding the personnel hostage and seizing weaponry.

==== 14 March ====
- A Separatist was allegedly killed by state-backed 'death squad' militia in Khuzdar District.
- Two insurgents were killed in a military operation in Dera Ismail Khan District.
- Five Pakistani Taliban and three FC soldiers were killed in skirmishes in Mohmand District.
- Four people including a JUI-F District chief were wounded in a bomb blast in a mosque in South Waziristan District.
- Two alleged separatists were captured from Quetta.
- Ten insurgents were killed in a failed insurgent infantry and suicide attack in South Waziristan District.
- Seven insurgents and two soldiers were killed during a military operation in Mohmand District.
- An alleged suicide bomber was captured following a shootout in Lahore that wounded a civilian.
- Pakistani Taliban launched a spring offensive codenamed "Operation Al Khandaq".
- Pakistani Taliban attacked two police stations in Lakki Marwat District causing no casualties, however two policemen were wounded and an insurgent were killed in an IED attack and shootout.
- Insurgents attacked a Police post and conducted raids and grenade attacks on two Police Stations in Bannu District.

==== 15 March ====
- A local journalist who was allegedly a separatist was captured from Barkhan District. of Balochistan on March 15,
- A policeman was killed and six more wounded in an IED attack targeting an Anti-Terrorist Force vehicle in Quetta.
- A Lashkar-e-Taiba commander and another militant were killed in Jehlum District.
- A soldier was killed and another wounded in a BLF attack on an Airport checkpoint in Gwadar.
- BLF attacked and claimed to have captured a Police checkpoint in Mastung District.
- BLf conducted an attack on a military checkpoint in Kech District.
- A soldier was killed during a military operation in Kech District.
- Two Pakistani Coast Guards were wounded in a BLF grenade attack on the coast guard HQ in Gwadar.
- Two insurgents were killed during a clash in Dera Ismail Khan District.

==== 16 March ====
- An FC soldier was killed and another wounded in an insurgent attack on a gas extraction facility in Karak District.
- A Policeman was killed and another wounded in an insurgent attack targeting a Police post in Peshawar.
- A Policeman was killed in an insurgent attack on a police post in Karak District.
- A policeman was killed in an insurgent attack in South Waziristan District.
- A security guard was killed and three were wounded in a Sindhudesh Separatist attack on a Pakistan People's Party convoy in Ghotki District.
- Nine soldiers were wounded in Taliban attack on a border post in Bajaur District.
- Nine alleged separatists were captured from Nushki District.
- A Pakistani Taliban commander, Kashif Azmatullah was killed in a Police operation in Karak District.
- Separatists attacked a Police Station in Lakki Marwat District but were forced to retreat following heavy resistance by the defenders.
- Three dead bodies were recovered in Kech District with bullet holes.
- Three FC soldiers and two civilians were killed in a BLA VBIED attack on an FC convoy in Nushki District.

==== 17 March ====
- Separatists attacked a convoy of 20+ military vehicles in Nushki District leading to heavy skirmishes.
- Military launched a large scale operation in Nushki and Kharan Districts employing aviation.
- Five civilians including four children were wounded in a grenade attack on the SHO house in Khuzdar District.
- Army conducted several raids in Quetta, detaining a tribal elder.
- Three insurgents were killed in a military operation in Khyber District.
- Insurgents conducted a grenade attack on a police checkpost in Peshawar.
- Two 'death squad' militiamen were wounded by BLA separatists in Panjgur District.
- Two soldiers were wounded in an attack on their checkpoint in Peshawar District.
- Two insurgents and a civilian were killed during skirmishes with the Counter Terrorism Department in North Waziristan District.
- Two insurgents were killed by military forces after the former were fleeing having killed a policeman in Bannu District.
- Insurgents assassinated a JUI-F politician in Quetta.
- Separatists attacked the house of a policeman in Kech District with grenades but caused no casualties.
- Separatists killed a police officer in Bannu Cantonment.

==== 18 March ====
- A most-wanted insurgent was killed in a police encounter in Charsadda District, a handgun, grenades and other materials were recovered from him.
- An Army Major and a soldier were killed in a landmine blast in Zhob District.
- A soldier was killed and two were wounded by BLA separatists as they blocked a highway and conducted two attacks on military forces in Kohlu District.
- Pakistan and Afghanistan border forces skirmished in Kurram District causing no casualties.

==== 19 March ====
- A large-scale military operation was initiated in Dera Bugti District capturing several alleged separatists and establishing checkpoints.
- Locals thwarted an insurgent attempt to kidnap soldiers by attacking the insurgents while they attempted to besiege the houses of FC personnel in Tirah.
- Separatists seized two vehicles, four handguns, four rifles and four mobile phones during an assault in Kalat District.

==== 20 March ====
- Ten insurgents and one military officer were killed and three soldiers were wounded in a military operation in Dera Ismail Khan District.
- Four soldiers were killed and five were wounded in a BLA IED attack targeting a military convoy while an additional soldier was killed and three more were wounded in a separate IED attack in Kech District.
- Counter-Terrorism Department conducted an operation in Rawalpindi capturing two Pakistani Taliban.

==== 21 March ====
- A soldiers was killed and two others were wounded in an attack on a unit in Mohmand District.
- A policeman was killed and his son was injured in an insurgent attack in Bannu District.
- A soldier was killed and another wounded in a BLA raid on a military camp in Mastung District.
- A civilian was killed in an attack on a Levies checkpoint in Mastung District.
- Two civilians were wounded in an insurgent attack in Khyber District.
- Two policemen were wounded in a Separatist attack on the N-25 highway in Khuzdar District.

==== 22 March ====
- Pakistani Taliban released videos showcasing presence and interactions with local population in Karak District.
- Separatists destroyed a medical college under construction and machinery used for its construction in Naseerabad District.
- Four Punjabi civilians were target killed in the Kalat District by separatists.
- BLF claimed to have seized a weapon from a Police officer in Kharan District.
- Separatists on motorcycle attacked a police Vehicle and killed four Policemen in Nushki.
- The vice chairma of Jamiat ulema-e-Islam-Fazl Qari Nizamudin, was assassinated in Attock.
- BLA attacked a police station in Dera Murad Jamali District causing material damage.
- Three soldiers were wounded in a BLA attack on their post in Kech District.

==== 23 March ====
- 13 insurgents were struck while attempting to infiltrate from Afghanistan into Pakistan in South Waziristan.
- Four soldiers were wounded in a grenade launcher attack on their post in Kech District.
- A soldier was killed and three were wounded in another BLA grenade attack on an Army post in Kech District.
- Four soldiers were wounded in a BLA attack on a checkpoint on Airport Road in Turbat.
- 16 insurgents were killed while attempting to infiltrate across the border in North Waziristan.
- BLA attacked two military posts in Turbat with grenade launchers.
- BLA blocked the highway in Panjgur District for two hours.
- Counter-Terrorism Department and Kohat District Police launched a joint clean-up operation against insurgents conducting several raids.
- Three soldiers were killed and four were wounded in a BLA attack on an Army camp in Panjgur District.

==== 24 March ====
- A local "peace militiaman" was killed by insurgents in Tank District and two more were killed in Kohat District.

==== 25 March ====
- A local peace militiaman was killed in Swat District.
- A local politician of JUI-F, was assassinated in Karachi.
- A police official was killed by insurgents in South Waziristan.
- A police official was killed by insurgents in Hangu District.
- A Policeman was killed and another was injured in an insurgent attack in Lakki Marwat District.
- Two Sindhi civilians were targeted by separatists in Kharan District.
- Four facilitators of Jaffar Express highjacking were captured by the Counter-Terrorism Department in Bolan District.
- Two military personnel were killed and three were wounded in an IED attack in Kalat District.

==== 26 March ====
- A gas pipeline to Punjab was destroyed by separatists in Rajanpur District.
- A soldier was killed and five were wounded in n insurgent ambush in Dera Ismail Khan District.
- A CTD official was killed and a levies official was wounded in a Separatist attack on their vehicle in Mastung. * Four bodies of previously captured alleged separatists were recovered from Awaran District.
- Separatists blocked roads in Nasirabad District and destroyed mineral carrying vehicles and also blocked roads in Kharan District.
- Separatists destroyed a part of road in Kolpur.
- Separatists attacked a military camp in Turbat inflicting casualties.
- Separatists attacked a Levies station and seized a police motorcycle and a vehicle in Washuk District and also blocked roads.
- Explosions and fighting was reported in Turbat
- Separatists attacked several trucks on a highway in Kech District setting some alight.
- Police and CTD launched a joint operation, destroying hideouts of Pakistani Taliban commanders in Karak District.
- An alleged separatist was captured from Quetta.
- Separatists blocked a highway in Gwadar District and attacked a bus carrying passengers traveling from Gwadar to Karachi killing six Punjabi civilians.
- Separatists attacked military forces in Sibi District.
- Separatists destroyed four additional trucks in Kech District
- CTD and Police on March 26 killed a Taliban commander in Hangu District.

==== 27 March ====
- A police SHO was targeted in an IED attack in Bajaur District bit remained safe.
- Ten insurgents were killed during three engagements in North Waziristan.
- An insurgent was killed in an encounter in Dera Ismail Khan District while a soldier wounded in the previous day's attack also died in the same district.
- Three people were killed and 21 were wounded in an attack targeting a Police vehicle in Quetta.

==== 28 March ====
- Baloch Raji Aajoi Sangar claims having conducted attacks against military forces for the last two days.
- Eight insurgents and seven soldiers were killed while six more soldiers were wounded during a military operation in Lakki Marwat District.
- Three Policemen and one civilian were in a grenade attack on a police camp in Karachi.
- Three soldiers and one civilian were killed in a bomb blast in Gwadar District.

==== 29 March ====
- Six insurgents were killed in an operation in Kalat District.
- A suicide bomber attacked the Balochistan National Party-Mengal sit-in in Mastung District.
- Two FC personnel were killed and five were wounded in an IED attack on their vehicle in Orakzai District.
- Two Pakistani Taliban were killed while attempting to attack a police post in Dera Ghazi Khan District.

==== 30 March ====
- An Ahle Sunnat Waljamaat leader was killed and his father were injured in a sectarian Attack in Karachi.
- A policeman was injured in an insurgent attack in Lakki Marwat District.

==== 31 March ====
- Two on patrol police personnel were killed by insurgents in Peshawar.

=== April 2025 ===
==== 1 April ====
- Balochistan Liberation Front attacked an FC checkpoint in Bolan District.

==== 2 April ====
- BLF destroyed a Ufone telecommunications tower Kharan District.
- Curfew was imposed in Tank and South Waziristan Districts amid concerns of insurgent attacks.
- Pakistani Taliban started demanding protection money from sugar mills in Dera Ismail Khan threatening to attack in the case it wasn't paid.

==== 3 April ====
- Insurgents tried to enter a mosque in Lakki Marwat District and engaged in a skirmish with locals but a truce was agreed upon and the insurgents withdrew before the arrival of police.
- An alleged separatist was captured from Hub District.

==== 4 April ====
- Two separatists were killed during a military operation in Kech District.

==== 5 April ====
- Three suspected separatists ssfe killed in a skirmish with military personnel in Khuzdar District.
- CTD seized a cache of explosives, arms and ammunition in the vicinity of the Radio Pakistan Tower in Quetta, foiling a terror plot.
- Bodies of three previously captured alleged separatists were recovered from Awaran District.

==== 6 April ====
- A CTD personnel was wounded in an insurgent attack in Bannu District.
- An FC soldier was wounded in an insurgent attack in Peshawar.
- A JuI-F politician was assassinated in Kalat District while another in Peshawar.
- Insurgents set up road blocks in Tank District and kidnapped a police officer from his vehicle.
- Eight insurgents were killed while attempting to cross the border from Afghanistan to Pakistan in North Waziristan District.
- Nine Taliban were killed in a military operation in Dera Ismail Khan District.
- BLF conducted a grenade attack on a military checkpoint in Kharan and an assault on a checkpoint in Kech District.
- Two alleged separatists were captured from Kech District.
- Two hospitals were damaged in insurgent bomb attacks in Tank and Lakki Marwat Districts.

==== April 7 ====
- An Ahle-e-Sunnah Wal Jamat affiliate was assassinated in a sectarian attack in Peshawar.
- The bullet ridden body of an already captured alleged separatist was discovered in Awaran District and three more such Bodies were recovered from Barkhan District.
- Three Pakistani Taliban were captured during a raid by CTD and Sindh Rangers in Karachi.

==== 8 April ====
- A policeman was killed by insurgents in Khyber District.
- A blast was reported at a patrol vehicle near a levies post in Malakand District but caused no losses.

==== 9 April ====
- A Military Intelligence personnel was killed by BLA in Nushki District.
- A TTP commander was killed in skirmishes with local civilians while attempting to kidnap a policeman and his family in Lakki Marwat District.
- A soldier was killed and four were wounded in a BLA IED attack on their vehicle on the Coastal Highway.
- Pakistani Taliban released photos of two soldiers they captured from Tonsa District.
- CTD and intelligence apparatus conducted a raid in Karachi capturing a Pakistani Taliban.
- Pakistani Taliban acquired US-made FGM-148 Javelin ATGMs left over in Afghanistan.
- Three policemen were killed in an insurgent attack in Quetta.

==== 10 April ====
- A Pakistani Taliban commander was killed in a military operation in Lower Dir District.
- Pakistani Taliban attacked a policeman's house in a failed attempt to abduct him in Lakki Marwat District and damaged his house.
- An alleged separatist, who was a minor was captured from Khuzdar District.
- Two family members of a BLA suicide bomber were captured from Bolan District.
- Pakistani Taliban released the two soldiers abducted from Tonsa District.
- BLF executed two men in Awaran District accusing them of killing separatists.
- Two children were killed and one was wounded in an accidental grenade detonation in Kohat District.

==== 11 April ====
- An alleged separatist was captured from Karachi.

==== 12 April ====
- An alliance, "Ittihad-ul-Mujahideen Pakistan" was created between Lashkar-e-Islam, Tehreek-e-Taliban Pakistan, Hafiz Gul Bahadur Group and Harakat-e-Inqila-e-Islami.
- A DPO and his convoy were targeted in an IED attack in Shangla District but remained unharmed.
- Two alleged separatists were captured from Dera Bugti District.
- Two Excise and Taxation Department personnel and a private driver were killed in an insurgent attack on a checkpoint in Nowshera District.
- Two Pakistani Taliban were killed and one was captured from South Waziristan.
- Separatists attacked a levies post in Kharan District seizing weapons and equipment.
- Insurgents destroyed a policeman's house in Lakki Marwat District.

==== 13 April ====
- A hand grenade attack targeted a Police Station in Quetta.
- A local politician was assassinated in an insurgent attack in Lakki Marwat District.
- A policeman was assassinated in Karachi.
- Three insurgents were killed and several wounded in a joint police and military operation in Lakki Marwat District.
- Police recovered a large quantity of explosives from Nasirabad District foiling a terrorist plot.

==== 14 April ====
- A jail cook was assassinated by insurgents in Mardan District.
- A policeman was killed by Pakistani Taliban in Bannu District.
- Pakistani Taliban attempted an infiltration attempt from Afghanistan into Chitral District.
- Three separatists and a soldier were killed in an attack on a paramilitary camp in Nushki District.
- Seven rescue workers were wounded in a bomb blast targeting their building in Tank District.
- Two decapitated bodies of captured Policemen were recovered from South Waziristan District.

==== 15 April ====
- An alleged separatist was captured from Quetta.
- A former local representative was killed and a civilian with him was wounded in an attack on their vehicle in Kohat District.
- A non-Baloch barber was killed by separatists in Quetta.
- A judge and a lawyer were killed by insurgents in Mardan District who attacked their vehicle.
- Pakistani Taliban attempted to infiltration into Chitral District but encountered severe resistance leading to an hour of battle followed by 45 rounds of mortar being fired into Afghanistan, insurgents suffered heavy casualties.
- Three Policemen were killed and 19 were injured in a bomb blast on a Balochistan Constabulary vehicle in Mastung District.
- Four soldiers and six civilians were wounded in a bomb blast on a patrol vehicle in Bajaur District.
- Civilians were evacuated and bunkers were destroyed during a limited military operation in Tirah.
- Dead body of an alleged separatist was recovered from Kech District and another from Gwadar District.
- Sindhudesh Revolutionary Army attacked a Police post in Jamshoro District using grenades.
- Two Policemen were wounded in an insurgent raid in Bannu District.
- Two World Health Organization personnel and Tehsil Polio Officers were kidnapped by separatists following an attack on their vehicle in Dera Ismail Khan District.

==== 16 April ====
- A military vehicle was destroyed in an IED attack in Panjgur District.
- A Policeman and a civilian were wounded in a skirmish following an insurgent attack on a Police vehicle in Lakki Marwat District.
- Four alleged separatists were captured from Paroom Tehsil.
- Four insurgents were killed and two were wounded in a military operation in Dera Ismail Khan District.
- An alleged separatist was captured from Kech District.
- CTD captured a Sindh Revolutionary Army militant from Karachi.
- CTD captured two BLA separatists from Karachi.
- Dead body of the son of a Baloch politician was recovered from Khuzdar District.
- Two Pakistani Taliban were killed in a military operation in Dera Ismail Khan District.

==== 17 April ====
- A policeman was killed and four were wounded in a Pakistani Taliban attack on their van in Dera Ismail Khan District.
- Four insurgents and one soldier were killed during a military operation in Dera Ismail Khan District.
- Six alleged separatists were captured from Kech District.
- A soldier was killed and two were wounded in a BLA IED attack on a bomb disposal squad in Kech District.
- BLA established a two-hour blockade in Naseerabad and resisted police attempts to dismantle it.
- BLA killed a military veteran in Nushki District.
- BLA conducted a grenade attack on personnel near a post in Turbat.
- BLF killed an alleged 'death squad' leader in Kech District.
- BLF conducted a grenade attack on a military outpost in Kech District.
- Dead body of an alleged separatist who was previously captured was recovered from Turbat District.
- Nine TTP insurgents were captured from Azad Kahsmir.

==== 18 April ====
- An alleged separatist was captured from Karachi.
- Three people were killed and several missing in secterian attacks in Kurram District.
- Four insurgents were killed during a military operation in Swat District.

==== 19 April ====
- Five separatists were killed during a CTD operation in Duki District.
- BLF attacked a Police station in Kech District.
- One state-backed "death squad" member was killed in skirmishes while attempting to capture an alleged separatist from Khuzdar District.
- Separatists attacked a Police station and seized weapons and equipment in Kech District.

==== 20 April ====
- Five insurgents were killed during a military operation in North Waziristan.
- BLA killed a "key member" of the state-backed "death squad" militia in Kech District.
- BLA claimed to have captured the Gwandh Saren Levies post in Kech District.
- CTD along with police forces killed ten insurgents during an operation in Mianwali District.
- An alleged separatist was captured from Turbat.

==== 21 April ====
- An FC soldier was killed by insurgents in Lakki Marwat District.
- A policeman and an insurgent were killed during a skirmish following an attack on a polio vaccination team in South Waziristan District.
- Sindh Rangers and CTD captured BLF fighters from Karachi during a raid.
- Police repelled an insurgent attack on a Police post in Bannu District.
- An insurgent commander was killed during a military operation in South Waziristan District.
- BLA set up temporary roadblocks and checkpoints on the highway between Turbat and Hoshab in Kech District.
- BLF attacked a military camp in Panjgur District.
- BLF attacked a military checkpoint at an officer's residence in Kech District.

==== 25 April ====
- An attempted border infiltration near Hassan Khel, North Waziristan leads to a series of clashes between security forces and militants.
- 4 Pakistani soldiers were killed and 3 injured in a blast in the margat area of Quetta.

=== May 2025 ===
==== 6 May ====
- 7 Pakistani soldiers were killed in a bomb blast in Kachhi District.*

==== 29 May ====
- 4 Pakistani soldiers including a captain were killed in a militant assault in Shawal.

==== 30 May ====
- BLA militants temporarily seized the town of Surab on a highway junction part of CPEC in Kalat District assaulting key sites.

=== June 2025 ===
==== 24 June ====
- 2 Pakistani soldiers including a major were killed in an intelligence based operation in Sararogha, South Waziristan.

==== 28 June ====
- At least 13 Pakistani soldiers were killed and 15 injured in an ambush in Mir Ali, the HGB faction claimed responsibility.

=== July 2025 ===
==== 16 July ====
- A major was killed in an intelligence based operation in Awaran District.

==== 19 July ====
- A major was killed by an IED in the western bypass of Quetta.

==== 21 July ====
- Pakistani security forces in Bannu reported that militant Quadcopter assaults are increasing in frequency, having occurred at-least 8 times in the last two and a half months

==== 26 July ====
- The Nishan-e-Imtiaz national award is conferred to CENTCOM chief Michael Kurilla.

==== 27 July ====
- A human rights protest in Tirah Valley was fired upon, resulting in the deaths of 5-7 civilians and injury of many.

=== August 2025 ===
==== 6 August ====
- A vehicle carrying security personnel was struck killing three including a police inspector.

==== 7 August ====
- Militants targeted an FC convoy in Karak killing three soldiers and the driver.
- Militants killed a Pakistani soldier on leave in Lakki Marwat.
- An IED attack on a vehicle belonging to Pakistani security forces in Mastung resulted in the death of 3 Pakistani soldiers.

==== 11 August ====
- Militants attacked a convoy in Basima in Washuk District at night, killing 9 soldiers including a captain. This attack happened the same day the US Department of State designated the BLA and the Majeed Brigade FTOs.

=== September 2025 ===
==== 12 September ====
- 7 FC soldiers were killed in Maidan area of lower Dir and 1 went missing in Lal Qila, Lower Dir during a search and strike operation.

==== 13 September ====
- At least 12 Pakistani soldiers were killed and 4 injured in an attack in South Waziristan

==== 16 September ====
- Five Pakistani soldiers including a captain were killed by an IED in Kech District.

==== 22 September ====
- An airstrike on the Tirah Valley killed at least 30 people, initially the authorities claimed that the strike hit a TTP bomb factory but later investigations revealed it only killed civilians.

==== 30 September ====
- 10 people were killed and 30 injured in an attack involving militants ramming a car into FC Headquarters and engaging in a gunfight with FC soldiers after breaking in.

=== October 2025 ===
==== 8 October ====
- 11 soldiers including a major and a lieutenant colonel were killed in an intelligence based operation in Orakzai Agency.

==== 9 October ====
- A major was killed in an intelligence based operation in the Daraban area.
- Pakistan launched multiple airstrikes on targets throughout Afghanistan resulting in a long-lasting standoff.

==== 21 October ====
- 10 Pakistani soldiers were killed in an ambush in the Serwekai tangi area.

==== 29 October ====
- 6 soldiers including a captain were killed in an intelligence based operation in Dogar area Kurram.

=== November 2025 ===
==== 11 November ====
- A car attack outside the Judicial District Complex in Islamabad killed 12 and injured 36 in what would be the deadliest attack the city faced in nearly a decade, JuA claimed responsibility.

==== 24 November ====
- At least three Pakistani soldiers were killed in a blast targeting the FC Headquarters Peshawar.

=== December 2025 ===
==== 9 December ====
- 6 Pakistani soldiers were killed in a militant attack on a security checkpoint in Kurram Agency

==== 19 December ====
- Four soldiers were killed in an attack at the boya camp in North Waziristan.

==== 28 December ====
- Pakistani think tank PICSS (Pakistan Institute for Conflict and Security Studies) stated that the year 2025 was the deadliest for militants in Pakistan in a decade.

==== 29 December ====
- A major ranked officer was killed during an IBO in Bajaur as part of Operation Sarbakaf.

=== January 2026 ===
==== 9 January ====
- Brussels based think tank the International Crisis Group (ICG) stated that Pakistan was the worst country affected by the Kabul takeover.

==== 12 January ====
- 7 Pakistani police officers were killed in a bomb blast that targeted their armoured vehicle in the town of Tank.

==== 30 January ====
- Baloch militants carried out attacks in various locations throughout the province and temporarily seized the town of Nushki.

=== February 2026 ===
==== 15 February ====
- BLA released a footage of seven soldiers it captured and stated a seven day deadline for a prison exchange with Pakistan army.

==== 16 February ====
- A VBIED assault on a Pakistani security checkpost killed 11 Pakistani security forces, 01 civilian and 12 TTP attackers.

==== 21 February ====
- A lieutenant colonel and a sepoy were killed in an IBO in bannu.

=== March 2026 ===
==== 13 March 2026 ====
- A vehicle side IED on the Indus Highway in Lakki Marwat killed 7 pakistani police officers including an SHO.

==== 21 March 2026 ====
- The Global Terrorism Index report for 2026 was published, Pakistan ranked 1st worldwide in terrorism-affected countries.

=== August 2026 ===
==== 6 August 2026 ====
- Pakistani security forces killed 12 militants in Washuk, Mastung district of Balochistan.

==== 9 August 2026 ====
- Pakistani forces killed 15 militants in multiple areas of Balochistan.

==== 12 August 2026 ====
- Pakistani security forces killed 18 militants in Balochistan's Surab district.

=== September 2026 ===
==== 2 September 2026 ====
- Pakistan security forces killed 12 BLA militants in Balochistan's Kalat district.

==== 3 September 2026 ====
- Pakistan forces killed 15 TTP militants who were trying to cross border from Afghanistan to Pakistan.

==== 5 September 2026 ====
- Pakistani security forces announced they killed 20 militants in between 3-5 September.

==== 6 September 2026 ====
- Pakistani security forces killed 8 BLA militants in Kharan Balochistan.

==== 7 September 2026 ====
- Pakistani security recovered 2.9 tons explosive from militant hideout and killed 3 TTP militants.

==== 15-17 September 2026 ====
- 10 TTP militants killed in KPK meanwhile 6 troops killed in IDE blast.

==== 18-19 September 2026 ====
- BLA militants tired to disrupt movement on N-25 Highway by establishing a check post for abduction, extortion and snatching vehicles. Pakistani security forces attack on their position killed 5 militants and recovered 23 kidnapped people along side multiple vehicles.

==== 20 September 2026 ====
- Pakistani security forces attack a group of militants, killing 9, with 6 Pakistani personnel dying in the exchange.

==== 24 September 2026 ====
- 5 BLA militants were killed and ammunition recovered by Pakistani forces.

==== 25 September 2026 ====
- 11 militants were killed by Pakistani forces during an intelligence based operation in Nuskhi district.

=== October 2026 ===
==== 1 October 2026 ====
- Pakistani security forces killed 6 militants in Kachhi, Baluchistan.

==== 4 October 2026 ====
- 15 militants killed by Pakistani forces while infiltrating from Afghanistan to Pakistan.

==== 5 October 2026 ====
- 3 militants killed by Pakistani forces in Dera Ismail Khan.

==== 6 October 2026 ====
- Pakistani security forces killed 5 militants in North Waziristan.

==== 18 October 2026 ====
- 8 BLA militants killed by Pakistani forces in Nushki and Khuzdar districts of Balochistan.

==== 19 October 2026 ====
- A Pakistani army major and 4 militants killed during an IBO.

==== 17 October 2026 ====
- 20 under training policemen abducted by unidentified men.

==== 20 October 2026 ====
- Pakistani forces recovered 20 abducted police personnel.

==== 22 October 2026 ====
- 4 policemen and 2 TTP militants killed in an engagement.

==== 25 October 2026 ====
- Pakistani security forces killed a TTP commander Adil Shah alias Darvesh in Balochistan.

==== 26 October 2026 ====
- 9 BLA militants killed by Pakistani focres in Kachhi and Wadh districts of Balochistan.

=== November 2026 ===
==== 3 November 2026 ====
- 17 BLA militants and 1 Pakistan army soldier got killed during an engagement.

==== 5 November 2026 ====
- 2 militants including a suicide bomber killed by Pakistani forces in Lakki Marwat. 7 militants and 1 security forces soldier killed in Balochistan.

==== 9 November 2026 ====
- Pakistani security forces attacked an militants hideout killed 2 militants and recovered a large amount of destructive material.

==== 11 November 2026 ====
- 12 Policemen got killed in an ambushed by TTP militants, TTP also suffered from 18 Fatalities as police fired back.

==== 12 November 2026 ====
- 2 civilian killed by BLA militants, 3 BLA militants got killed by Balochistan Police.

==== 14 November 2026 ====
- 2 troops and 16 TTP militants were killed in North Waziristan during an fierce fight.

==== 16 November 2026 ====
- 22 TTP militants killed by Pakistani forces during multiple engagements on multiple locations in KPK.

==== 18 November 2026 ====
- 5 BLA militants in separate incidents in Balochistan.

== International reaction ==
According to ThePrint, the anti-terrorist operation was carried out under pressure from China, as the China-Pakistan Economic Corridor has been hit by terrorist attacks many times before. Pakistan announced its new counterterrorism plan soon after Shehbaz Sharif returned from a five-day visit to China.

Although Pakistan urges the US to provide modern small arms, a spokesperson of the US State Department said "We support Pakistan's efforts to combat terrorism and ensure the safety and security of its citizens in a manner that promotes the rule of law and protection of human rights." Starting from 3 July, the American and Pakistani troops started two-week-long counterterrorism exercises in Pabbi, Khyber Pakhtunkhwa.
