= Withdrawal of United States troops from Iraq =

The withdrawal of United States troops from Iraq may refer to:

- Gulf War § The end of active hostilities
- Withdrawal of United States troops from Iraq (2007–2011)
- Withdrawal of United States troops from Iraq (2020–2021)
- Withdrawal of United States troops from Iraq (2025–2026)

== See also ==
- Withdrawal of United States troops from Afghanistan
