= Withdrawal of United States troops from Afghanistan =

The United States has conducted two withdrawals of United States troops from Afghanistan:

- Withdrawal of United States troops from Afghanistan (2011–2016), draw down of United States Armed Forces in the Afghanistan war
- 2020–2021 U.S. troop withdrawal from Afghanistan, withdrawal of all United States combat forces from Afghanistan

== See also ==
- Withdrawal of United States troops from Iraq
