= Operation Khyber =

Pakistani military operation

- Part of Insurgency in Khyber Pakhtunkhwa and the war on terror
- Khyber Agency is the yellow colored region
Date	7 October 2014 – 21 August 2017
Location	Khyber Agency, FATA, Pakistan
Result	Pakistani victory: Area cleared of militants; militant bases dismantled; Khyber returned to government control

Belligerents
Pakistan	Lashkar-e-Islam; Jamaat-ul-Ahrar; Tehrik-i-Taliban Pakistan Islamic State of Iraq and the Levant – Khorasan Province

Commanders and leaders
President; Mamnoon Hussain Prime Minister; Shahid Khaqan Abbasi (2017); Nawaz Sharif (2014–2017) Army Chief; Qamar Javed Bajwa (2016–2017); Raheel Sharif (2014–2016) Chairman JCSC; Zubair Hayat (2016–2017); Rashad Mahmood (2014–16) DG ISI; Naveed Mukhtar (2016–2017); Rizwan Akhtar (2014–2016) Air Chief; Tahir Rafique Butt Naval Chief; Muhammad Zakaullah	Mangal Bagh †; Mullah Fazlullah †; Omar Khalid Khorasani †

Units involved
Pakistan Army: 21st Artillery Division; Pakistan Air Force (Khyber Pakhtunkhwa) Frontier Corps	Unknown

Casualties and losses
During Operation: 4 killed (as of 3 January 2015); 11 injured	In Pakistani offensive: 280+ killed (as of 3 January 2015); 400 surrendered

Khyber was the code-name for a 2014–2017 military offensive conducted by Pakistan's military in the Khyber Agency in four phases; Khyber-1, Khyber-2, Khyber-3 and Khyber-4.

Khyber Agency was among Pakistan's seven semi-autonomous tribal districts near the Afghan border, rife with insurgents and militants. Terrorist organisations including Al Qaeda and ISIS have had presence there. The plains of Bara held strategic significance for militant groups as they connect the agency to the outskirts of Peshawar. The key area also straddled the NATO supply line into Afghanistan. The region has been long fought over by a mix of militant organisations, including the Tehrik-i-Taliban Pakistan (TTP), the Ansar ul Islam and Mangal Bagh's Lashkar-e-Islam.

== History ==
Operation Khyber was originally announced in 2014 as a part of Pakistan Army's extension of Operation Zarb-e-Azb to parts of Khyber Agency. It was conducted in four phases, with Khyber-4 targeting ISIS among other terrorist organizations.

=== Khyber-1 ===
Amid failed attempts to negotiate with militants, Pakistan army declared the time to negotiate for terrorists operating in the restive Tehsil was over and that militants had no option but to either lay down arms or face a military crackdown. The operation 'Khyber-1' began with airstrikes against Lashkar-e-Islam outs in areas under the Mangal Bagh led group's control in Tirah and Bara on 17 October 2014, Ultimately killing 21 militants and destroying their three key bases. Sources said the main aim of the operation was to clear Khyber from Bara to the border of Tirah valley, following which the second phase of the operation will begin.

=== Khyber-2 ===
Announced in February 2015 and launched in March 2015, Operation Khyber-2 was aimed to clear the Tirah valley main target being Tehrik-i-Taliban Pakistan. The Tirah Valley consists of deep valleys and high mountains, a suitable time of year was chosen, although resulting in many casualties of Pakistan Armed Forces, the operation was successful. The operation formally ended on 15 June 2015, marking a one-year anniversary of Operation Zarb-e-Azab.

=== Khyber-3 ===
Launched on 16 August 2016, Khyber-3 intended to clear areas beyond the Tirah Valley closer to the Durand Line nine militant dens were decimated along the border, Large dumps of arms and ammunitions were discovered, More than 40 terrorists were killed and 21 injured, the operation ended up greatly affecting the cross border movement of terrorists. The operation Khyber-3 was conceived ended with the start of Khyber-4.

=== Khyber-4 ===
Operation Khyber-4 was announced on 15 July 2017 as part of Pakistan Army's ongoing offensive Operation Radd-ul-Fasaad against militancy.

Launched on 15 July 2017, phase I aimed to clear Rajgal valley, targeting Jamat-ul-Ahrar among other terrorist organizations, more than 13 terrorists were killed and 6 injured. A Pakistani soldier was also killed in exchange of fire. A total area of 90 kilometres was cleared with the help of Artillery under the leadership of Lt Col Usman Waheed Commanding officer 60 Medium Regiment Arty. The Inter-Services Public Relations (ISPR) announced the end of first phase of Operation Khyber-4 on 21 July 2017, declaring the operation to be successful.

On 21 August 2017, Director General ISPR Maj Gen Asif Ghafoor announced the successful completion of Operation Khyber-4. The ground objectives in the Rajgal and Shawal valleys were achieved. During the campaign, 52 terrorists were killed, 32 injured, four surrendered and one was arrested. Two soldiers of the Pakistan Army were also killed in the six-week long counter-terrorism operation.

== Belligerents ==
- Pakistan Armed Forces
- Lashkar-e-Islam

Lashkar-e-Islam (Urdu: لشكرِ اسلام), (LI or LeI) (literally Army of Islam) is a militant organization active in and around Khyber Agency, Federally Administered Tribal Areas, Pakistan. LeI was founded in 2004 by Mufti Munir Shakir. Currently the organization is headed by Mangal Bagh. LeI had control in Tirah and Bara.

- Jamaat-ul-Ahrar

Jamaat-ul-Ahrar is a militant Islamist group that split away from the Tehrik-i-Taliban Pakistan in August 2014. On 9 November 2014, JuA spokesman Ehsanullah Ehsan confirmed that Abu Jandal was leading a contingent of 50 fighters in battle against the Pakistani security forces in Tirah. He further said that 50 more fighters would soon be on their way to the valley.

- Tehrik-i-Taliban Pakistan

Tehrik-i-Taliban is an umbrella organization of various Islamist militant groups based in the northwestern Federally Administered Tribal Areas along the Afghan border in Pakistan. Mangal Bagh is reported to have requested TTP and other militant groups to send their fighters to the Tirah valley to support LI. The TTP had announced it would send fighters to join LI.

== Preparations ==
Pakistan's security forces had blocked all entry and exit points of Bara at least two days ahead of the Khyber-1 military operation.

== Timeline ==
- On 16 October 2014, twenty-one suspected militants were killed and five hideouts were destroyed in air strikes on the militant group Lashkar-e-Islam in the Aka Khel area.
- On 17 October 2014, at least nine suspected militants were killed and 10 others were injured in an operation in the Bara area.
- On 25 October 2014, 18 militants were killed in Pakistani air strikes in Khyber Agency's Khyber district near the Afghan border.
- On 29 October 2014, Twenty militants were killed and eight others were injured in airstrikes by Pakistan Air Force in Akka Khel area of the Khyber Agency.
- On 9 November 2014, at least 27 militants were killed and two soldiers died as security forces carried out strikes in Akakhel and Tirah areas. Those killed included a key militant commander and two suicide bombers. Ten militant hideouts and an ammunition depot were also destroyed, according to ISPR.
- On 11 November 2014, at least nine militants were killed and 12 others injured in a clash between security forces and militants in the Akakhel area of Bara Agency. Four key militant commanders also surrendered to authorities.
- On 12 November 2014, at least 19 militants were killed during air strikes in Sandapal and Akakhel areas of Khyber Agency. According to the ISPR, an important militant commander was also killed. Furthermore, the air strikes destroyed at least five militant hideouts and an ammunition depot in the area.
- On 21 November 2014, at least twenty-two militants were killed in airstrikes against militant hideouts in various parts of Tirah valley of Khyber Agency, according to ISPR.
- On 28 November 2014 at least 11 suspected militants were killed and five hideouts were destroyed in airstrikes in Tirah valley.
- On 29 November 2014, Two Taliban commanders were killed in a clash with the security forces in Jamrud Tehsil of Khyber Agency. Official sources said that the clash occurred in Lashora area of Jamrud which left militant commanders of Tehreek-i-Taliban Pakistan, Abubakar and Wajid, dead.
- On 30 April 2015, security forces captured the strong holds at Sandapal, Tordara, Kundwala and Mehrban Killay in Khyber Agency after an intense battle with terrorists. As a result, 27 terrorists were killed while 5 soldiers including an officer "Captain Ajmal" were KIA.

== See also ==
- Operation Zarb-e-Azb
