= Operation Sirat-e-Mustaqeem =

- Part of the Insurgency in Khyber Pakhtunkhwa
Date	28 June 2008 – 9 July 2008 (1 week and 4 days)
Location	Bara Tehsil, Khyber Agency, Federally Administered Tribal Areas, Pakistan
Result	Pakistani victory: Pakistan Army gained control of Khyber Agency; Operation halted in July 2008; Destruction of LeI command and training centers

Belligerents
Pakistan	Tehrik-e-Taliban Pakistan; Al Qaeda; Lashkar-e-Islam

Commanders and leaders
PM Yousaf Gillani; M.Gen. Tariq Hayat	Mangal Bagh

Units involved
Pakistan Army; 40th Infantry Division; 9th Mountain Brigade	Tehrik-e-Taliban Pakistan; Tehreek-e-Nafaz-e-Shariat-e-Mohammadi; Al Qaeda; Lashkar-e-Islam

Strength
Unknown	Unknown

Casualties and losses
1 soldier killed	2 militants killed

The Operation Sirat-e-Mustaqeem (English: Operation Righteous Path), was a Pakistan Army operation in Bara Tehsil of Khyber Agency, Federally Administered Tribal Areas. The operation was commenced on 28 June 2008, and was halted by the Army on 9 July 2008, after liberating Bara Tehsil from the terrorist. On 9 July 2008 another operation, codenamed Zarbe-Kaleem, was launched in Hangu district.

== Khyber Operation ==
The Operation Sirat-e-Mustaqeem (English: Operation Righteous Path) was launched by Pakistan Army's 40th Infantry Division. Prime minister Yousaf Raza Gillani's government had ordered the Pakistan Army to launch an operation against the Taliban forces in the tribal district of Khyber Agency. According to the Prime minister, the operation was aimed at the Mangal Bagh, a Taliban commander, and was launched as last resort.

The 40th Infantry Division carried out aggressive military campaigns against Tehreek-e-Taliban Lashkar-e-Islam and its rival, Ansarul Islam. The troops were forwarded to Bara Tehsil of Khyber Agency where LeI headquarters were located.

The immediate trigger for the operation was two incidents of kidnapping which occurred in Peshawar on the 21 June 2008. Militants abducted six women from the city's posh Hatband neighborhood on allegations of involvement in human trafficking, and a group of 16 Christians, including two priests, was abducted in broad daylight during a prayer meeting. The Christians were released following hurried negotiations between the government and Islamist groups in the region. Both kidnappings were perpetrated by the Islamist group Lashkar-e-Islam, which was the target of Operation Sirat-e-Mustaqeem in Khyber Agency.

During the weeks of fighting, the 40th Infantry Division had taken control of a key town and demolished the LeI's military infrastructure. During the operation, two militants were reported to be killed while one soldier was also killed in operation. The military had removed the elements of the LeI organization. As result of the operation, Pakistan was able to secure government control in Khyber.
