= 2009 Khyber Pass offensive =

Coordinates: 34.093056°N 71.145833°E

- Part of the Insurgency in Khyber Pakhtunkhwa
| Date | 1 September – 30 November 2009 (2 months, 4 weeks and 1 day) |
| Location | Khyber Pass, Khyber-Pakhtunkhwa Province, Pakistan |
| Result | Pakistani victory |

Belligerents
| Pakistan | Lashkar-e-Islam |

Commanders and leaders
| Brig. Gen. Abid Mumtaz; P/A Tariq Hayat | Mangal Bagh |

Units involved
| Pakistan Armed Forces; Pakistan Army; 20th Mountaineering Brigade; 57th Army Combat Brigade | Lashkar-e-Islam |

Casualties and losses
| 2 soldiers killed | 151+ killed |

The 2009 Khyber Pass offensive was an offensive military campaign by Pakistani Army against Islamic militants from Lashkar-e-Islam in and near the Khyber Pass. The offensive was launched after a series of suicide bombings, including one at a police station where 17 cadets were killed. After two months, Pakistan Army defeated the militants and cleared the area from the militants.

== Military offensives ==
Pakistan Army launched an offensive campaign against militants after series of suicide bombings. The Pakistan Army infantry troops quickly launched operation which concluded with destroyed 4 militant bases, killed 40 militants, and captured 43 militants, according to Pakistan Army. Human Rights organizations claim Pakistani security forces executed surrendering militants, a claim which was denied by Pakistan. Outside a press briefing to journalists by local governor Tariq Hayat, a truck loaded with the bodies of militants and weapons seized from militants were displayed outside of the press briefing. Hayat gave no indication whether this would be a sustained offensive. Fighting continued, with large numbers of militants being killed or captured. 2 Pakistani soldiers were killed when their vehicle hit a land mine.

== See also ==
- Khyber Pass
- Federally Administered Tribal Areas
- Operation Zarb-e-Azb
- Mohmand Offensive
