= Jubilee medal of 100th Anniversary of the Diplomatic Service Bodies of Azerbaijan =

Award of the Azerbaijani Armed Forces

The medal “100th Anniversary of the Diplomatic Service of the Republic of Azerbaijan (1919-2019)”
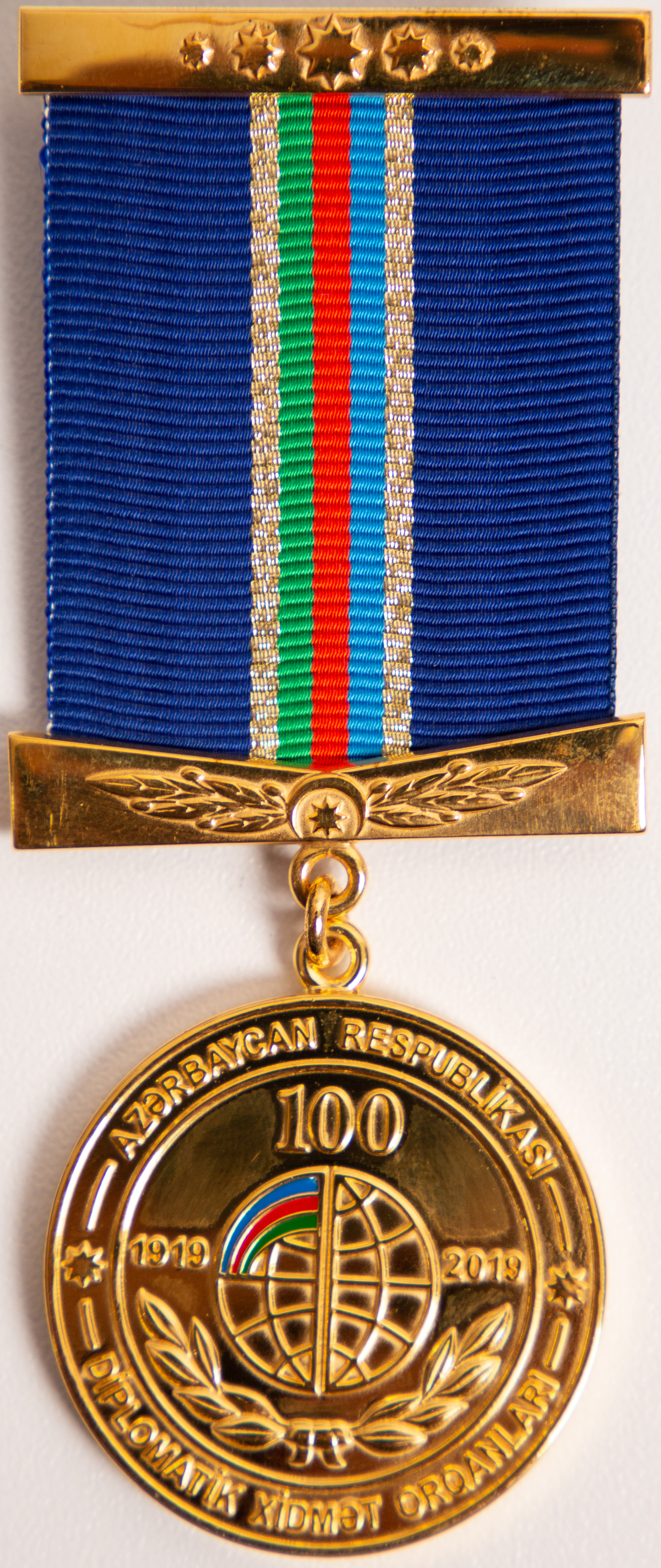
- Jubilee medal of 100th Anniversary of the Diplomatic Service Bodies of Azerbaijan
- Type: medal
- Country: Azerbaijan
- Presented by: the state
- Eligibility: active military service before March 29, 2019
- Ribbon of the medal

The medal “100th Anniversary of the Diplomatic Service of the Republic of Azerbaijan (1919-2019)” (Azerbaijani: “Azərbaycan Respublikasının diplomatik xidmət orqanlarının 100 illiyi (1919-2019)” yubiley medalı) is a state award of the Republic of Azerbaijan. It was established by law #1533-VQD of the Republic dated March 29, 2019. The medal is dedicated to the 100th Anniversary of the Diplomatic Service.

== History ==
On 16 February 2019, amendments to the Law "On Establishment of Orders and Medals of the Republic of Azerbaijan" were discussed at the meeting of National Assembly. The new medal “100th Anniversary of the Diplomatic Service of the Republic of Azerbaijan (1919-2019)” has been added to the list of medals.

== Awarding ==
The following persons will be awarded this medal:

- Employees fulfilling of their duties and receiving high results in the diplomatic service agencies,
- Persons performing administrative and technical service of diplomatic service agencies,
- Veterans of diplomatic agencies,
- Other persons who are actively involved in the development of diplomatic and international relations of Azerbaijan

== Recipients ==
- General Zubair Mahmood Hayat - Chairman, Joint Chief of Staff (Pakistan) (2016 - 2019)
- Nasir Mammadov, diplomat, former Ambassador Extraordinary and Plenipotentiary of the Republic of Azerbaijan to the Republic of Iraq.
- Fariz Ismailzade - member of the Azerbaijan Parliament.
