= Nasir Mammadov =

Azerbaijani diplomat

Nasir Mammadov Nəsir Məmmədov

Ambassador of Azerbaijan to Iraq
- In office 8 August 2023 – 16 December 2024

Personal details
- Born: 30 July 1985 (age 41) Baku, Azerbaijan SSR, Soviet Union
- Education: Western Caspian University (2001-2006); Moscow State Institute of International Relations (2008-2010); Sapienza University of Rome (2011-2012)
- Occupation: Diplomat

Nasir Natig oghlu Mammadov (Azerbaijani: Nəsir Natiq oğlu Məmmədov; born 30 July 1985 in Baku) is a diplomat, former Ambassador Extraordinary and Plenipotentiary of the Republic of Azerbaijan to the Republic of Iraq.

== Early life and education ==
Nasir Mammadov was born on July 30, 1985, in Baku. In 2001–2006, he received a bachelor's degree in international law from Western University. In 2008–2010, he received a master's degree in energy policy and diplomacy from Moscow State University of International Relations. In 2011–2012, he received a master's degree in political science, geopolitics and global security from the university of Rome La Sapienza. Since 2016, he holds the degree of Doctor of Philosophy in Law.

== Career ==
In 2008–2011, he worked as an attaché at the Ministry of Foreign Affairs of the Republic of Azerbaijan. In 2011–2015, he held the positions of attaché, third secretary, and second secretary at the Embassy of the Republic of Azerbaijan to the Italian Republic. In 2015–2019, he worked as second secretary, first secretary, and head of department at the Ministry of Foreign Affairs of the Republic of Azerbaijan. In 2019–2023, he served as Counselor and Chargé d'affaires at the Embassy of the Republic of Azerbaijan to the Republic of Iraq. On August 29, 2023, he was appointed as the Extraordinary and Plenipotentiary Ambassador of the Republic of Azerbaijan to the Republic of Iraq.

== Personal life ==
Nasir Mammadov is the son of a statesman, a well-known doctor, Natig Mammadov. He is the grandson of Nasir Mammadov, one of the founders of theoretical linguistics in Azerbaijan.

== Awards ==
- Jubilee medal of 100th Anniversary of the Diplomatic Service Bodies of Azerbaijan (2019)

== See also ==
- Azerbaijan–Iraq relations
- Foreign relations of Azerbaijan
