= Ansar ul-Islam (Pakistan) =

Banned militant group in Pakistan

Ansar ul Islam
- Founding leader: Saif-ur-Rehman
- Leader: Qazi Mehboob-ul-Haq
- Founded: 2004
- Country: Pakistan
- Ideology: Barelvi'ism; Islamism
- Status: Inactive
- Wars: War in North-West Pakistan

Ansar ul-Islam was a Barelvi Sunni Islamist militant group which operated in North-west Pakistan. It was founded in 2004 by Saif-ur Rehman, an Afghan preacher, influenced by the Barelvi movement of Sunni Islam. The group was a rival of Lashkar-e-Islam, another militant jihadist outfit.

By 2013, the group was being led by Qazi Mehboob-ul-Haq.

The group was banned by the Pakistani government in June 2008, and the ban was reiterated under Pakistan's 2014 National Internal Security Policy.
