= Fariz Ismailzade =

Azerbaijani scholar and public figure (born 1978)

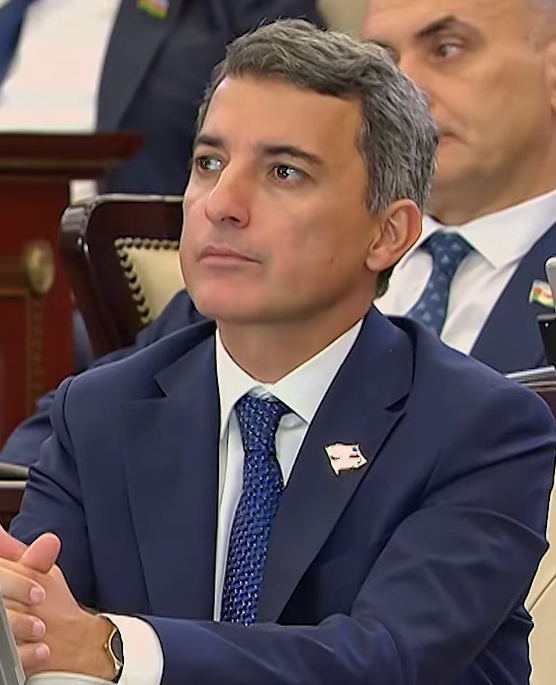

Member of the National Assembly of the Republic of Azerbaijan
- Incumbent
- Assumed office 23 September 2024

Personal details
- Born: September 2, 1978 (age 47) Lankaran, Azerbaijan
- Education: Western Caspian University; University of Washington; Maastricht School of Management; IE Business School
- Occupation: Politician, academic, and diplomat
- Awards: Taraggi Medal; Jubilee medal of 100th Anniversary of the Diplomatic Service Bodies of Azerbaijan

Fariz Akif oghlu İsmailzade (Azerbaijani: Fariz Ismayılzadə, born September 2, 1978) is an Azerbaijani scholar and public figure. He currently serves as a deputy in the VII convocation of the National Assembly of the Republic of Azerbaijan. Fariz Ismailzade has been the Vice Rector of ADA University since 2006 and the Director of the Institute for Development and Diplomacy since 2022.

== Life ==
Fariz Akif oglu Ismailzade was born on September 2, 1978 in Lankaran. He holds a Bachelor's degree in Political Science from the International Relations Department of Western University (1996–2000) and a Master's degree in Social and Economic Development from the University of Washington, USA (2000–2002), both of which he graduated with honors. From 2013 to 2015, he studied at the International Business School in Madrid, Spain, earning an Executive MBA. Later, he pursued doctoral studies at Maastricht School of Management in the Netherlands and obtained a PhD in 2021.

Fariz Ismailzade worked as a coordinator and manager for various short-term projects at the International Organization for Migration between 2003 and 2005. In 2006, he was appointed Vice Rector of ADA University, where he oversaw international relations, exchange programs with 120 foreign universities, professional development programs, research and sponsorship projects, corporate and government partnerships, and marketing and media relations. He has also led the European Union Knowledge Center, Caspian Energy and Environment Center, and the Institute of Development and Diplomacy.

On April 18, 2016, based on a decree from the President of Azerbaijan, Fariz Ismailzade was appointed a member of the Board of Directors of the State Examination Center. He has also been a member of the working group for the Azerbaijani National Education Strategy (2012) and the Coordination Headquarters for the centralized resolution of issues in the liberated territories of Azerbaijan, focusing on Science, Education, and Culture.

In September 2024, Fariz Ismayilzade was elected a Member of the Milli Majlis (National Assembly) of the Republic of Azerbaijan in its VII convocation. He is the Deputy Chairman of the Committee on Science and Education.

On October 8, 2024, he was elected head of the Azerbaijan–United Kingdom and Northern Ireland Parliamentary Relations Working Group.

== Scientific activity ==
Fariz Ismailzade is the editor of the "Baku Dialogues" scientific journal of ADA University. He is the editor of three books: "Liberated Karabakh" (ADA University, 2021), "The South Caucasus 2021: Oil and Geopolitics" (Jamestown Foundation Publishing, 2013), and "Global Politics of Azerbaijan: Formulation of Foreign Policy" (ADA University, 2009). He is also the author of the monograph "Russia's Energy Interests in Azerbaijan" (2005).

He has authored over 300 articles on energy security and regional politics, published in various American and European journals, including the Central Asia-Caucasus Institute, the Jamestown Foundation, Eurasiaet.org, Rubrik Turkish Politics, and the Strategic Studies Center (SAM). He has delivered papers at conferences organized by Wilton Park, Chatham House, NATO Research and Training, UCLA, Columbia University, the Fletcher School of Law and Diplomacy, the Vienna Diplomatic Academy, Moscow State Institute of International Relations (MGIMO), Science Po, and Nazarbayev University.

== Awards ==
Based on the Decree of the President of the Republic of Azerbaijan dated July 9, 2019, Fariz Ismailzade was awarded the "Taraggi" medal for his effective work in the diplomatic service of the Republic of Azerbaijan.

In 2019, he was also awarded the "Jubilee medal of 100th Anniversary of the Diplomatic Service Bodies of Azerbaijan" commemorative medal by the Ministry of Foreign Affairs of the Republic of Azerbaijan.

== See also ==
ADA University
