= Munir Shakir =

Founder of Islamic group Lashkar-e-Islam (1969–2025)

Lashkar-e-Islam Emir
- In office December 2004 – May 2005
- Succeeded by: Mangal Bagh

Personal details
- Born: Mufti Munir Shakir; April 4, 1969 Kurram Agency, Pakistan
- Died: 15 March 2025 (aged 55) Ormur, Peshawar, Khyber Pakhtunkhwa, Pakistan

Munir Shakir (Pashto/Urdu: منیر شاکر; 4 April 1969 - 15 March 2025) was a Pashtun Islamic scholar and former militant leader, who was the founder of Lashkar-e-Islam and a strong critic of state oppression and injustices against Pashtuns.

He actively participated in Pashtun Tahafuz Movement gatherings, including the Pashtun National Jirga in Khyber.

In December 2024, Shakir, along with Mufti Kifayatullah Swati, led a delegation of the Pashtun Jirga to Kurram District to mediate a Shia–Sunni conflict between two groups of Pashtun tribes.

Shakir was assassinated by a bomb planted outside a Peshawar mosque on 15 March 2025.

== Radio ministry ==
Shakir was born in 1969. His early education was at a school in Mokhi Zai. During his religious studies at Karbogha Sharif near Thall, he was mentored by his cousin, Maulana Syed Mukhtaruddin Shah, a respected cleric. Originally from the Kurram Valley, Shakir became known after he moved to Bara Tehsil, Khyber Agency, where he established an FM pirate radio station. Using this vehicle, he began to promote his religious beliefs, based in Deobandi theology. Among his more controversial pronouncements was his alleged declaration that opium was halal if it was produced and used for medical purposes.

Shakir worked in Kurram Agency until 2004.

== Enmity with Pir Saifur Rahman ==
In 2005, Saif-ur-Rahman Mubarak, a supporter of the more moderate Hanafi school of Islam, established his own FM pirate radio station to compete with Shakir's station and narrative. Rivalry between the two clerics increased, causing tribal elders to denounce the two in December 2005 for fomenting sectarian tension. Both clerics then went into hiding, with Shakir handing over control of his radio station and Lashkar-e-Islam organization to Mangal Bagh, a bus-driver-turned extremist militant. The hostilities peaked around 29 March 2006, when "hundreds" of Shakir's followers gathered in the Badshahkili neighborhood of Bara tehsil to attack Rahman's followers.

== Role in Lashkar-e-Islam ==
In 2004, Shakir founded the jihadist group Lashkar-e-Islam. Shortly thereafter, tribal leaders expelled Shakir and Saif-ur-Rahman from Bara Tehsil owing to violent clashes between their groups. Shakir turned over control of his organization to local bus driver Mangal Bagh. In 2008, the organization was banned by the government of Pakistan.

== Later activities ==
Shakir held a position with Ishaat-e-Tauheed, but disassociated from the group six to seven years before he died. He embraced the teachings of the Ahl-e-Quran movement and wrote books in which he argued that fabricated hadiths altered the true essence of Islam and that the Quran alone defined the true teachings of Islam. At the Pashtun National Jirga, he delivered a speech that condemned the Pakistani government's role in regional conflicts.

== Assassination ==
Shakir was killed in a bombing outside a mosque in Ormur, Peshawar, on 15 March 2025.
