= Institute for Development and Diplomacy =

Azerbaijani research institute

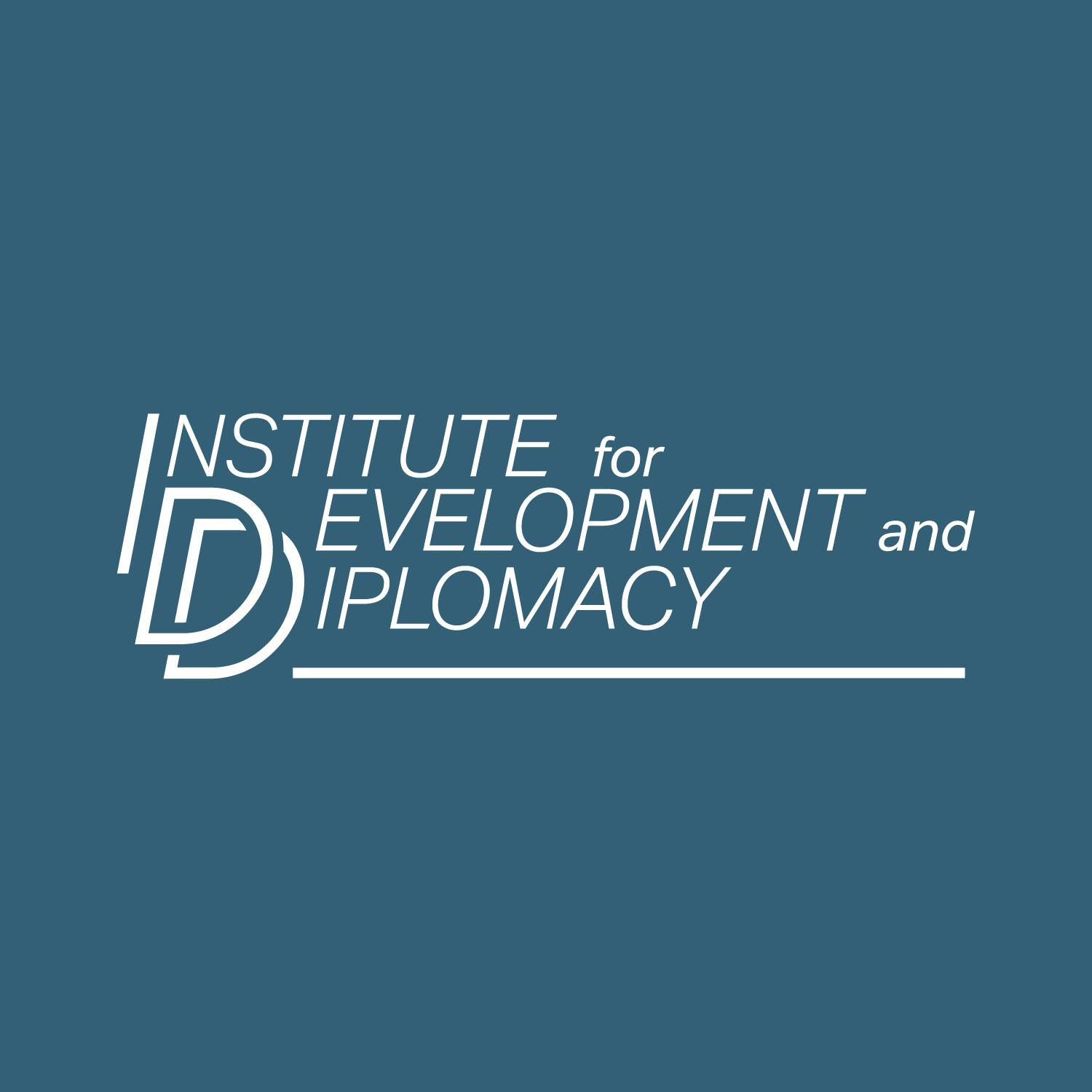
- Abbreviation: IDD
- Formation: 2022; 4 years ago
- Headquarters: Baku, Azerbaijan
- Location: 61 Ahmadbay Agha-Oglu Street, Baku, Azerbaijan
- Director: Fariz Ismailzade
- Website: https://idd.az/

The Institute for Development and Diplomacy (IDD) is an Azerbaijan-based research institute. It was established under ADA University in 2022 to research interdisciplinary policy issues. It is involved in publishing independent research, organizing conferences and policy briefings, and offering executive education programs. According to multiple reports, IDD organizes events focused on regional and global topics.

The IDD publishes materials on subjects including diplomacy, development, and regional cooperation, particularly related to Azerbaijan and its neighbors. Its primary focus is on the overlapping regions to which Azerbaijan and its neighbors belong. The IDD also oversees the academic book imprint ADA University Press and the quarterly policy journal Baku Dialogues. Baku Dialogues is an English-language quarterly journal published by ADA University. Initially launched in September 2014 and relaunched in September 2020, the journal explores policy issues relevant to the broader Silk Road region, such as energy politics, infrastructure security, economic development, and cultural heritage. The intended audience for Baku Dialogues includes policymakers, diplomats, business executives, academics, journalists, and others involved in regional and international affairs. It serves as a platform for intellectual discussion, policy-oriented debates, and diverse & independent policy perspectives.

== See also ==
- Fariz Ismailzade
