= Ormur, Peshawar =

Place in Peshawar, Khyber-Pakhtunkhwa, Pakistan

- Location within Khyber Pakhtunkhwa Location within Pakistan
- Country: Pakistan
- Province: Khyber-Pakhtunkhwa
- District: Peshawar District
- Time zone: UTC+5 (PST)

Ormur (Pashto: اورمړ, ), also spelled Urmar, is a neighborhood on the outskirts of Peshawar in Khyber Pakhtunkhwa, Pakistan. It comprises three similarly named villages: Ormur Bala, Ormur Miana, and Ormur Payan.

== Overview ==
Agriculture is the main source of income and the agriculture land of Ormur is very fertile. All 3 villages, Ormur Payan, Ormur Miana and Ormur Bala have farms of orchards of plum, pear and peach.

Ormur area was established in 1893 after the migration of Ormurs from their native Waziristan and Logar to Peshawar. The area was part of Nowshera District during the British Raj era, but now form part of Peshawar District.

== Administration ==
Ormur is part of Pakistan National Assembly seat NA-28 (Peshawar-4) while for KP Provincial Assembly it is part of PK-70.

== Population ==
According to 2017 census, the population of Ormur Bala was 36,460, Ormur Miana was 33,848, and Ormur Payan was 29,548.

According to 1998 census, the population of Ormur Bala was 24,007, Ormur Miana was 18,992, and Ormur Payan was 19,261.

== See also ==
- Peshawar District
- Nowshera District
