= Zubair Mahmood Hayat =

16th Chairman Pakistani Joint Chiefs of Staff (born 1960)

Zubair Mahmood Hayat NI(M) HI(M)
- زبیر محمود حیات
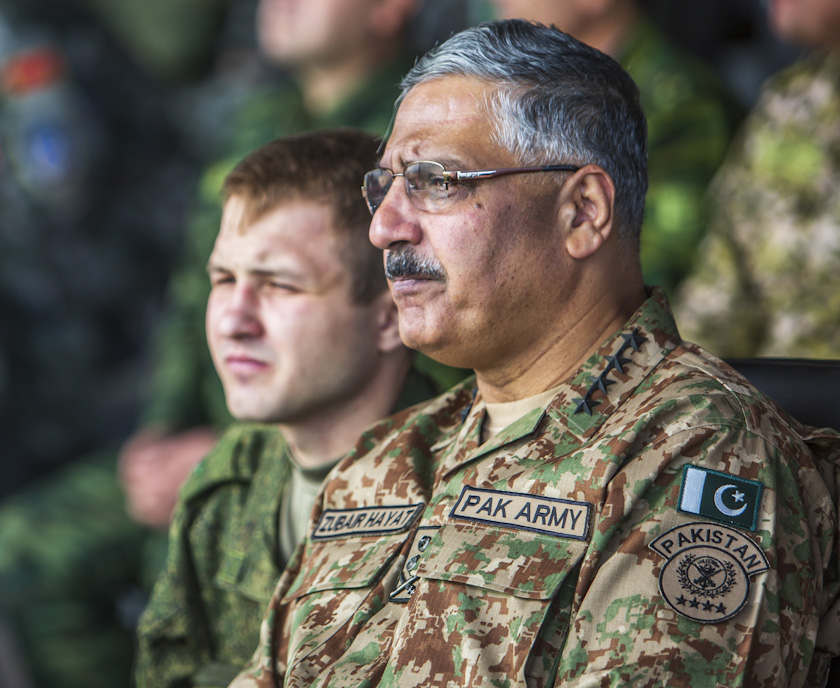
- Hayat in 2018

16th Chairman Joint Chiefs of Staff Committee
- In office 28 November 2016 – 27 November 2019
- President: Mamnoon Hussain
- Prime Minister: Nawaz Sharif
- Preceded by: Gen. Rashad Mahmood
- Succeeded by: Gen. Nadeem Raza

Chief of General Staff
- In office 9 April 2015 – 28 November 2016
- Preceded by: Lt-Gen. I. Nadeem Ahmad
- Succeeded by: Lt-Gen. Bilal Akbar

Director General Strategic Plans Division Force
- In office December 2013 – April 2015

Commander XXXI Corps Bahawalpur
- In office January 2013 – December 2013

Personal details
- Born: Zubair Mahmood Hayat
- Relations: Lt-Gen. Omar Mahmood Hayat (brother); Maj-Gen. Ahmad Mahmood Hayat (brother)
- Education: Iqra University Pakistan Military Academy; British Army Staff College; National Defence University
- Nickname: Zubair

Military service
- Allegiance: Pakistan
- Branch/service: Pakistan Army
- Years of service: 1978–2019
- Rank: General
- Unit: 3(SP) Medium, Artillery Corps
- Commands: XXXI Corps in Bahawalpur; DG Strategic Plans Division; GOC 15th Infantry Division; Military and Air attaché at the High Commission of Pakistan in London; Defence attaché at Embassy of Pakistan in Washington, D.C. Director-General Staff Duties at COAS Secretariat; Principal Staff Officer (PSO) to COAS
- Battles/wars: 2001 Indo-Pakistani standoff; 2008 Indo-Pakistani standoff; 2016 India-Pakistan military confrontation; 2019 India–Pakistan border skirmishes
- Awards: Nishan-e-Imtiaz (Military); Hilal-e-Imtiaz (Military); Order of King Abdulaziz; Turkish Legion of Merit; Azerbaijan Anniversary Medal; Republic of Azerbaijan Medal

Zubair Mahmood Hayat NI(M) HI(M) (born 1960) is a retired four-star rank army general of the Pakistan Army who served as the 16th Chairman Joint Chiefs of Staff Committee from 28 November 2016 until his retirement on 27 November 2019.

== Biography ==
Zubair Mahmood Hayat was born into a military family, and his father, Mohammad Aslam Hayat, served in the Pakistan Army, retiring as a major-general. After graduating from a local high school, Hayat joined the Pakistan Army in 1978, and entered in the Pakistan Military Academy in Kakul where he passed out with a class of 62nd PMA Long Course from the PMA Kakul in 1980.

Hayat gained a commission as 2nd-Lt. in the 3rd (SP) Medium, Artillery Corps on 24 October 1980.

Lt. Hayat was further trained as a forward observer at the U.S. Army's Field Artillery School in Fort Sill, Oklahoma, United States, where he qualified and graduated as an artillery specialist. In the United Kingdom, he attended the Staff College in Camberley, United Kingdom, and is a graduate of the National Defence University in national security coursework. In 2000–2001, Lieutenant-Colonel Hyatt commanded the infantry regiment during the times of military tension between India and Pakistan.

In 2002–04, Colonel Hayat was posted by the Ministry of Defence on a diplomatic assignment, serving as a military and air attaché at the High Commission of Pakistan in London, United Kingdom. In 2004–07, Col. Hayat was later posted as a defence attaché at the Embassy of Pakistan in Washington, D.C., United States.

In 2007, Col. Hayat was promoted to one-star army general, and moved to the Army GHQ after being recalled to Pakistan. Subsequently, Brigadier Hayat was appointed as chief of staff to the Chief of Army Staff's office, where he served until 2010. In 2010–12, Brig. Hayat was promoted to the two-star rank; Major-General Hayat was appointed as a GOC of the 15th Infantry Division, stationed in Sialkot Cantt.

In 2013, Lieutenant-General Hayat was elevated as a field commander of the XXXI Corps, stationed in Bahawalpur but this appointment remained short-lived. In December 2013, he was appointed as Director-General of the Strategic Plans Division Force (SPD Force), which is responsible for providing protection to the country's nuclear arsenals.

In 2015, Lt-Gen. Hayat was again posted at the Army GHQ and appointed as the Chief of General Staff under army chief General Raheel Sharif.

== Chairman joint chiefs ==
In 2016, Prime Minister Sharif confirmed the timely retirement of Chairman Joint Chiefs General Rashad Mahmood, while General Raheel Sharif dismissed rumours of seeking the extension for his term.

Initially, the race for the appointment for the army chief was rumored to be between Lt-Gen. Hayat and Lt-Gen. Javed Ramday who was close to the first family. At the time of this promotion, Lt-Gen. Hayat was the most senior military officer in the military, and Prime Minister Sharif announced to appoint him as the Chairman Joint Chiefs.

On 28 November 2016, Prime Minister Sharif announced the appointment of the junior-most General Javed Bajwa as the chief of army staff, superseding two senior army generals who were retired from their respective military services.

In 2016, Gen. Hayat was awarded with Nishan-e-Imtiaz (Military).

In March 2019, at a conference organised by the Pakistan Institute for Conflict and Security Studies (PICSS), in collaboration with the Institute of Business Administration (IBA), Center for Entrepreneurial Development (CED), Karachi, he categorically underlined the historical foundation of Pakistan in Mehrgarh, and the mistakes made by United States in Afghanistan, in his key note address.

== Reception and family background ==
In Pakistan's news media, Hayat is rumored to have been gifted with an eidetic memory, and a sharp reader.

Zubair Mahmood Hayat is born into a military family, and his father, Mahmood Aslam Hayat, served in the Pakistan Army, retiring as a major-general. He has also served as PSO to General Ashfaq Parvez Kayani. His younger brother, Lt-Gen. Omar Mahmood Hayat, had briefly served as chairman of the Pakistan Ordnance Factories (POF) before being transferred and posted at the National Disaster Management Authority (NDMA) while his youngest sibling, Ahmad Mahmood Hayat served as a Director General in the Inter-Services Intelligence (ISI).

== Awards and decorations ==

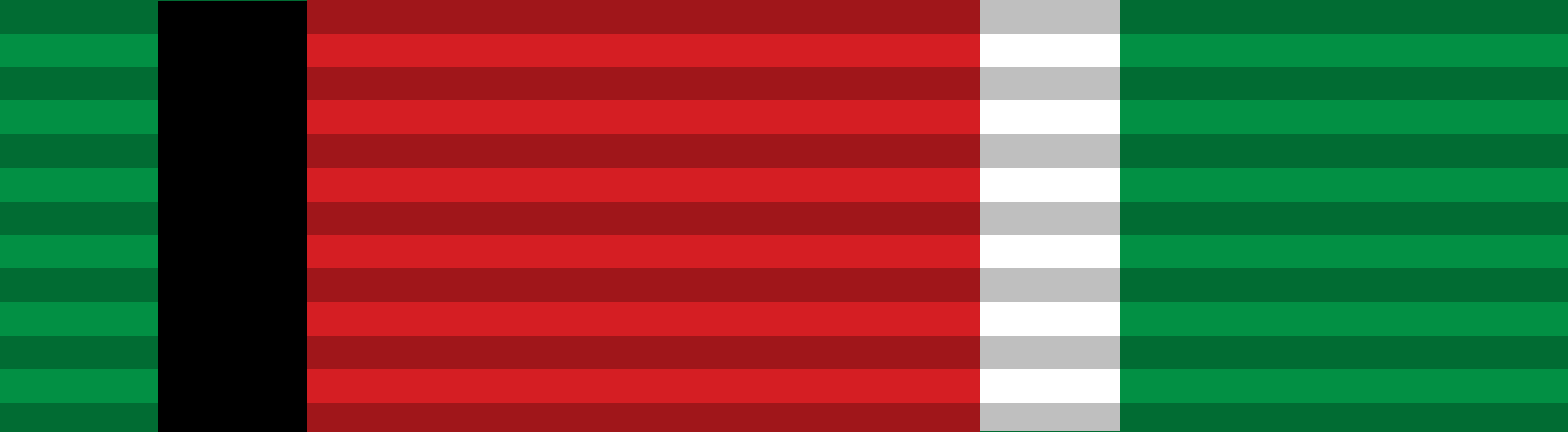

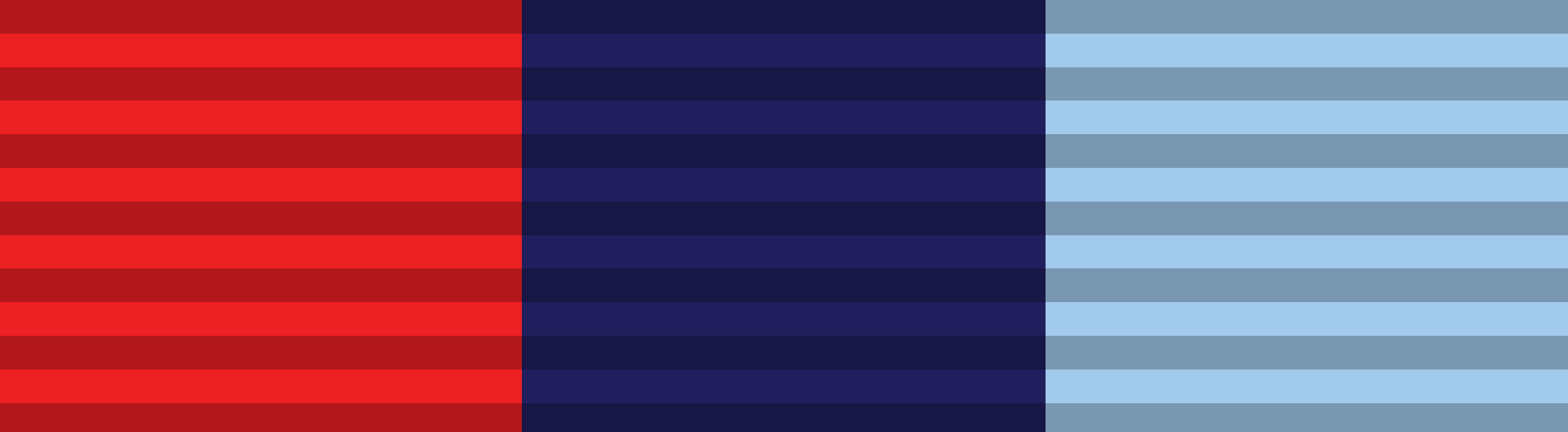

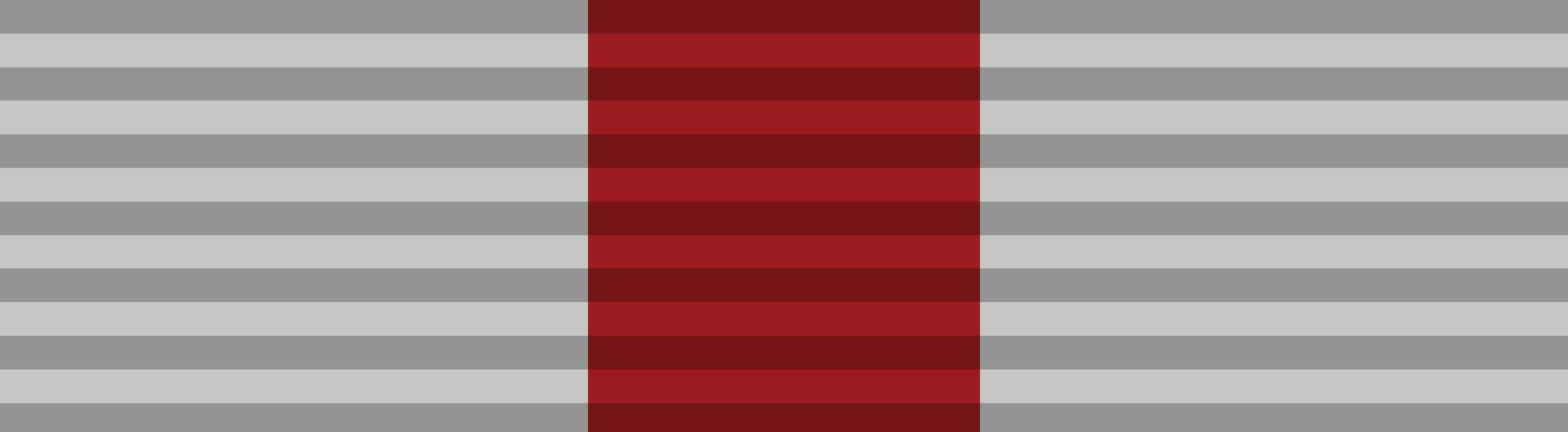

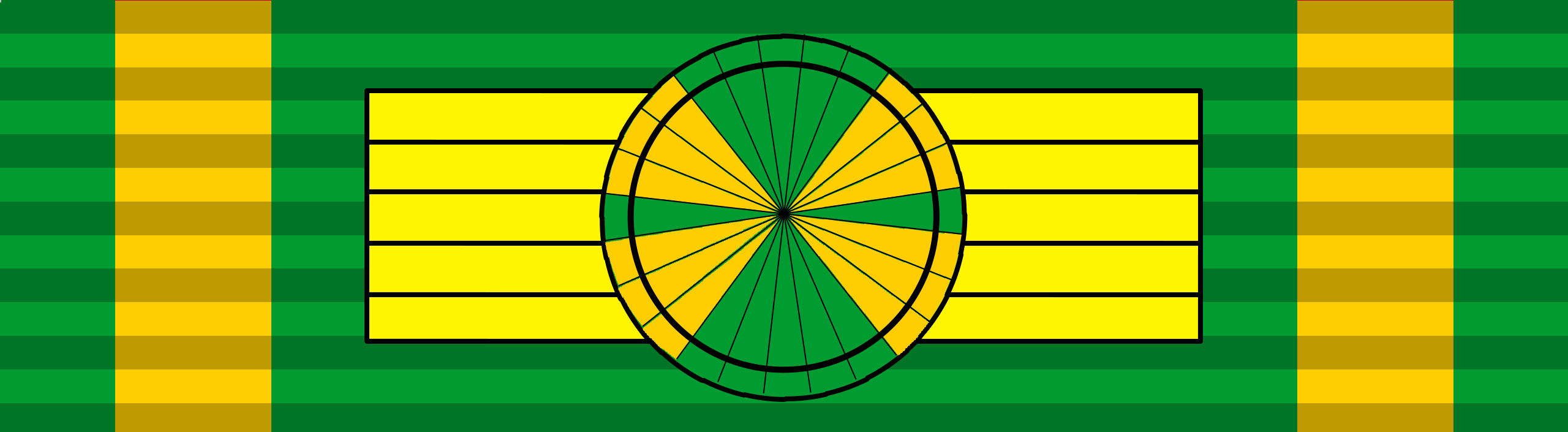

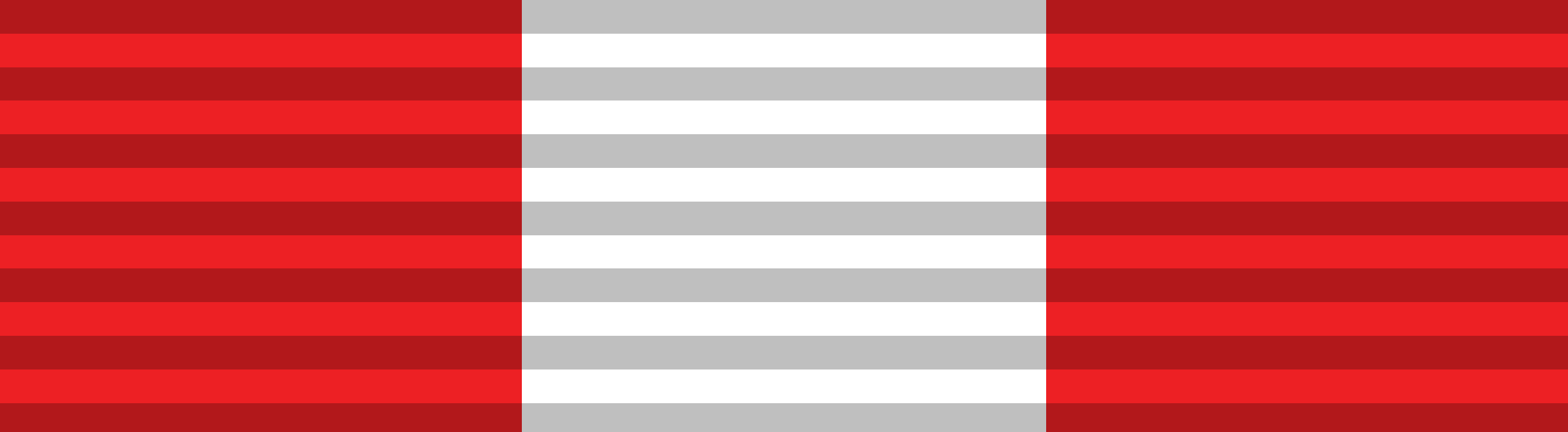

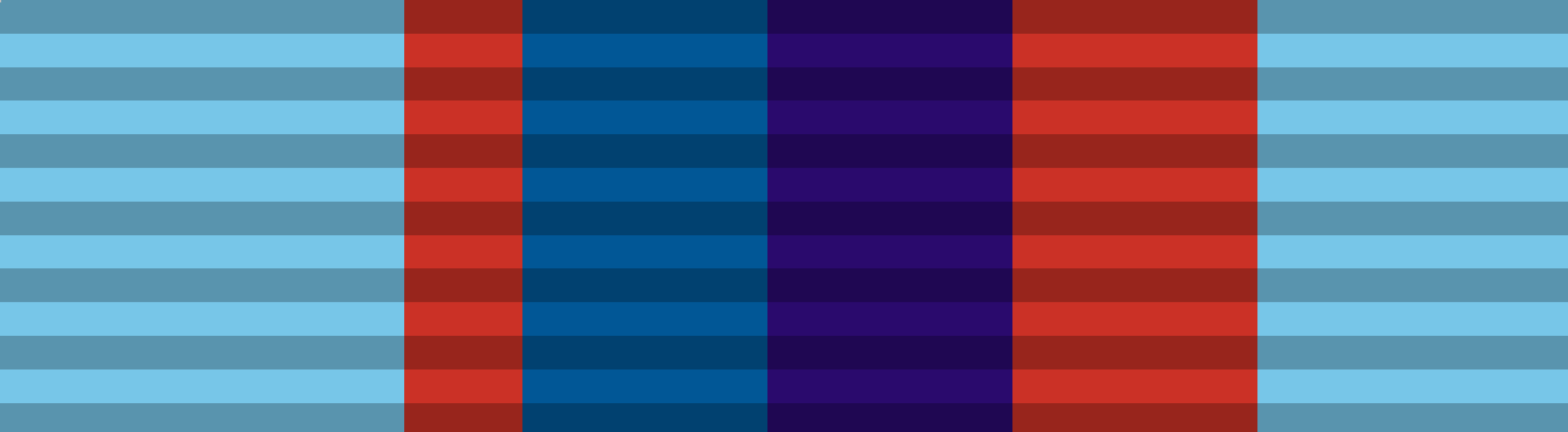

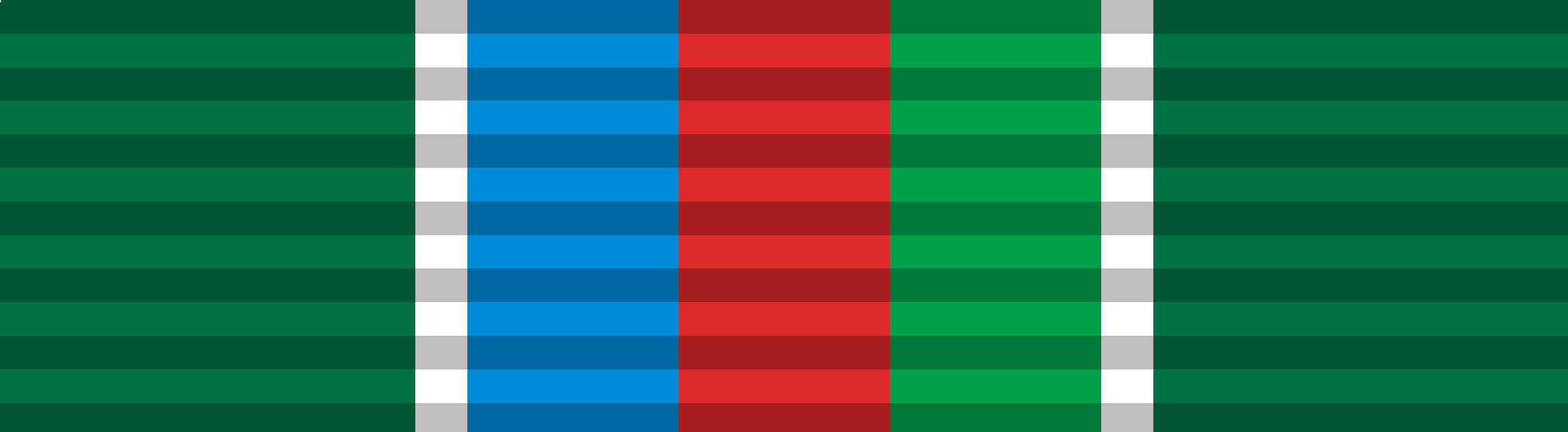

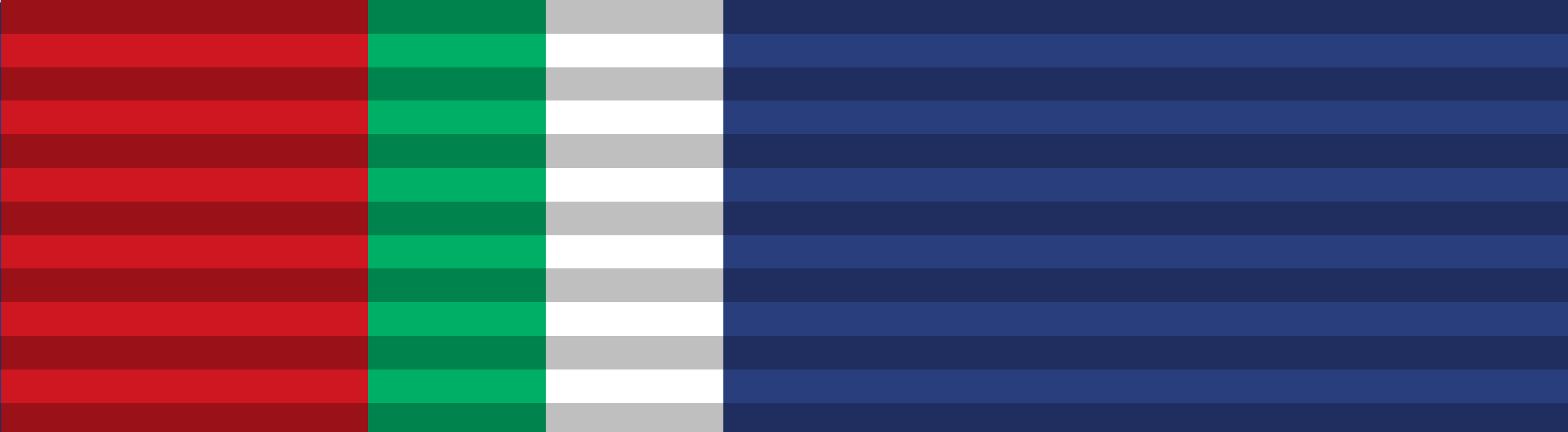

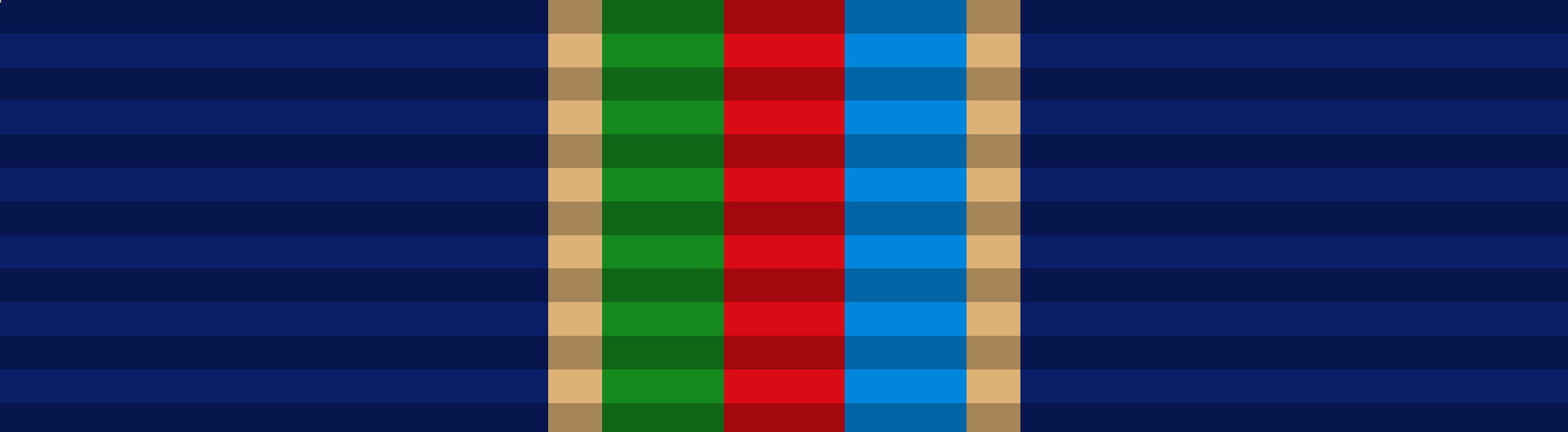

Nishan-e-Imtiaz (Military) (Order of Excellence) (2016)		Hilal-e-Imtiaz (Military) (Crescent of Excellence) (2011)	
Tamgha-e-Baqa (Nuclear Test Medal) 1998	Tamgha-e-Istaqlal Pakistan (Escalation with India Medal) 2002	Tamgha-e-Azm (Medal of Conviction) (2018)	10 Years Service Medal
20 Years Service Medal	30 Years Service Medal	35 Years Service Medal	40 Years Service Medal
Tamgha-e-Sad Saala Jashan-e- Wiladat-e-Quaid-e-Azam (100th Birth Anniversary of Muhammad Ali Jinnah) 1976	Hijri Tamgha (Hijri Medal) 1979	Jamhuriat Tamgha (Democracy Medal) 1988	Qarardad-e-Pakistan Tamgha (Resolution Day Golden Jubilee Medal) 1990
Tamgha-e-Salgirah Pakistan (Independence Day Golden Jubilee Medal) 1997	Command & Staff College Quetta Student Medal	Order of King Abdul Aziz (1st Class) (Saudi Arabia) 2017	Turkish Legion of Merit (Turkey) 2017
Defence General Staff Joint Commendation Medal (Italy) 2018	100th Anniversary of the Azerbaijan Army Medal 2018	Badge of Honour (Belarus) 2018	100th Anniversary of the Diplomatic Service of the Republic of Azerbaijan (1919–2019) 2019

=== Foreign decorations ===
Foreign Awards
Saudi Arabia	Order of King Abdul Aziz (1st Class)
Turkey	Turkish Legion of Merit
Italy	Defence General Staff Joint Commendation Medal
Azerbaijan	100th Anniversary of the Azerbaijan Army Medal
Belarus	Badge of Honour - (Belarus)
Azerbaijan	100th Anniversary of the Diplomatic Service of the Republic of Azerbaijan (1919–2019)

== See also ==
- Indo-Pakistani relations
- India-Pakistan military confrontation (2016-present)

Military offices
Preceded by Rashad Mahmood	Chairman Joint Chiefs of Staff Committee; 2016–2019	Succeeded by Nadeem Raza
