= Rashad Mahmood =

Pakistani general

General Rashad Mahmood NI(M) HI(M)
- راشد محمود
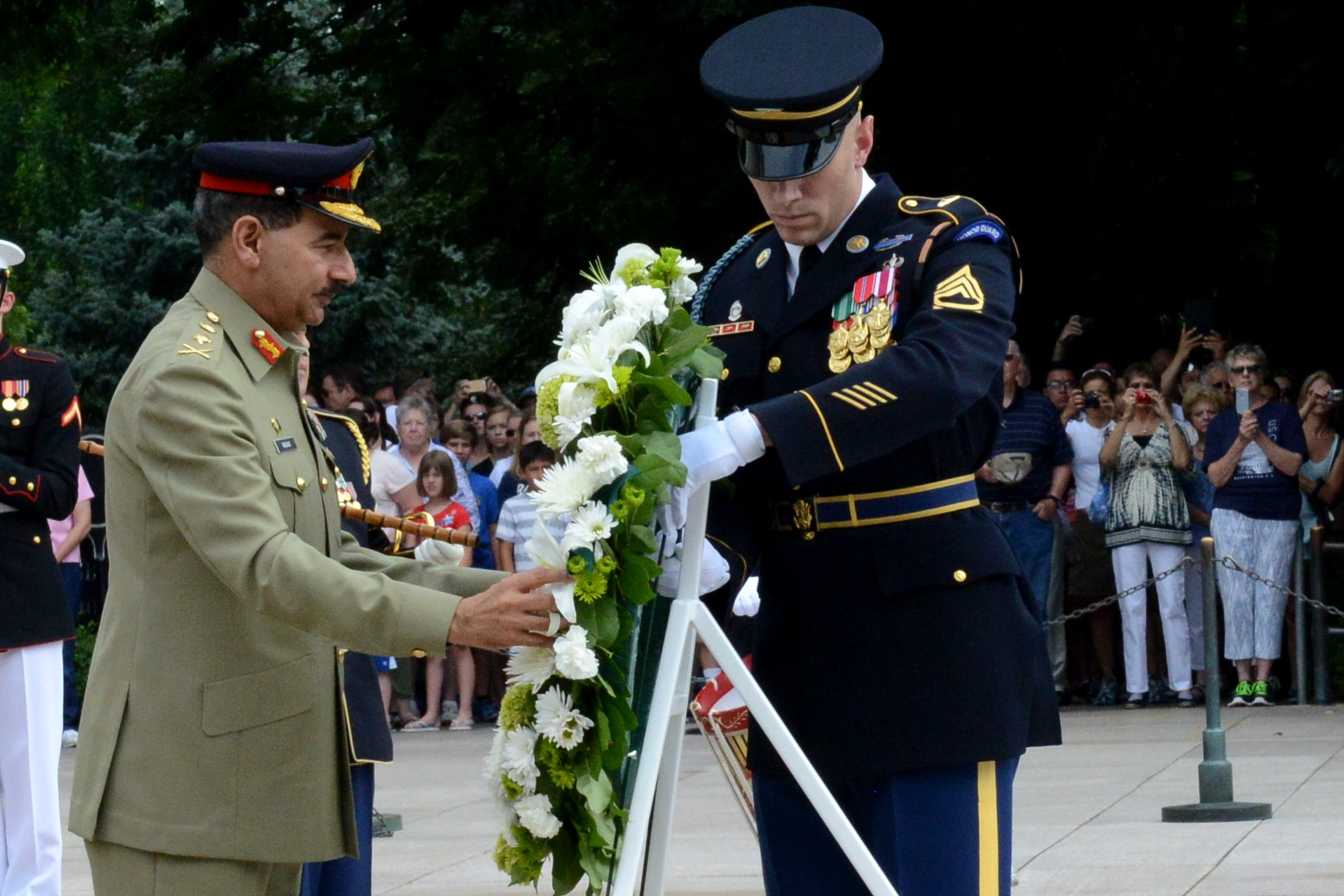
- Mahmood lays a wreath at the Tomb of the Unknowns in 2014

15th Chairman Joint Chiefs of Staff Committee
- In office 29 November 2013 – 26 November 2016
- President: Mamnoon Hussain
- Prime Minister: Nawaz Sharif
- Preceded by: Ashfaq Pervaiz Kayani (Acting)
- Succeeded by: Zubair Mahmood Hayat

Personal details
- Born: Pakistan
- Education: Pakistan Military Academy; National Defence University; Canadian Army Command and Staff College
- Awards: Nishan-e-Imtiaz; Hilal-i-Imtiaz

Military service
- Allegiance: Pakistan
- Branch/service: Pakistan Army
- Years of service: May 1975 – November 2016
- Rank: General
- Unit: 7 Baloch Regiment
- Commands: Corps Commander IV Corps; Chief of General Staff

Rashad Mahmood NI(M) (Urdu: راشد محمود), is a retired four-star army general in the Pakistan Army who served as the 15th Chairman Joint Chiefs of Staff Committee. He was appointed as Chairman Joint Chiefs of Staff Committee of Pakistan by prime minister Nawaz Sharif on November 27, 2013. He retired on November 27, 2016.

== Biography ==
He was commissioned in 1979 in 7th Battalion of the Baloch Regiment. He belongs to a Kashmiri Sheikh family settled in Sialkot.

He attended a Company Commander course in France and is a graduate of the Canadian Army Command and Staff College, National Defence University, Pakistan. He has varied experience of command, staff and instructional appointments. His major appointments include Platoon Commander, Pakistan Military Academy, Brigade Major Infantry Brigade, Instructor at Command and Staff College and National Defence University. He has remained Chief of Staff of Bahawalpur Corps and Military Secretary to the President.

Mahmood has commanded two infantry battalions, two infantry brigades and a United Nations contingent in Congo, Infantry Division at Sialkot, Director General at Inter-Service Intelligence Directorate, Islamabad and Commander 4 Corps (Lahore). After commanding the Corps, he took over as Chief of General Staff (Pakistan) in January 2013. He has been conferred with Hilal-i-Imtiaz (Military) and Nishan-e-Imtiaz (military).

Military offices
| Preceded by Ashfaq Pervez Kayani (Acting) | Chairman Joint Chiefs of Staff Committee; 2013–2016 | Succeeded by Zubair Mahmood Hayat |
