= Mangal Bagh =

Pakistani leader of Lashkar-e-Islam (1973–2021)

Mangal Bagh (1973 – 28 January 2021), also known as Mangal Bagh Afridi, was the leader of Lashkar-e-Islam, a militant group operating in Pakistan and Afghanistan. He was killed in a roadside bomb attack in Nangarhar, Afghanistan on 28 January 2021.

== Personal life ==
Bagh was from the Bara Tehsil, and belonged to the Sepah Afridi tribe. In his youth, he was ideologically affiliated with the Awami National Party (ANP) and used to wash cars at a taxi stand in Peshawar. Bagh then became a bus conductor for a private company plying vehicles between Bara and Peshawar and later became a bus driver.

Bagh was not very educated having only attended a primary school in his native town.

== Militant activity ==
Bagh was said to be a successor of Munir Shakir, a Deobandi cleric who established a pirate radio station in Khyber Agency in 2004 after being ejected from Kurram Agency by tribal elders for inciting sectarian hostility. When Shakir was ejected from Khyber Agency, he turned over his radio station to Bagh, a local driver, and Bagh then also led the militant group Lashkar-e-Islam founded by Shakir.

Bagh-led Lashkar-e-Islam allied itself with Tehreek-e Taliban Pakistan (TTP), an internationally designated terrorist group. In 2008, Bagh and his militant group retreated to Afghanistan following a series of military operations by the Pakistan army against the militants in Bara and later Tirah valley.

During his stay in Afghanistan, Lashkar-e-Islam allied itself with Islamic State of Iraq and the Levant (ISIS). In 2016, an Afghan news outlet, Pajhwok News, reported that Lashkar-e-Islam was gaining strength in Nangarhar after allying with ISIS. Nangarhar intelligence chief Maj. Gen. Dad Mohammad Harifi, however, said they had no evidence to prove if Mangal Bagh-led militants had ever attacked Afghan security posts in Nangarhar.

Afghan Taliban sources said Mangal Bagh had once joined forces with the Afghan government-backed militia known as Arbaki to fight the Afghan Taliban in Nangarhar province.

== Death ==
Bagh was killed in a roadside bomb attack in Nangarhar, Afghanistan on 28 January 2021. No group or individual claimed responsibility for Bagh's death, which was confirmed by Nangarhar's Governor Zia-ul-Haq Amarkhel.

His funeral held in Achin District, Afghanistan, was attended by a few of Bagh's close associates.

=== Previous reports of death ===
On 22 July 2016, Mangal Bagh was reported to have been killed in a drone attack in Nangarhar province, Afghanistan.

However, in May 2017, Inter-Services Public Relations tacitly admitted that reports of Bagh's death were false when they announced that Pakistani forces conducted an operation in Khyber Agency, killing several militants after receiving a tip-off relating to the presence of Bagh.

Reports of Bagh's death were proven false when the United States added Bagh to the U.S. State Department's Rewards for Justice wanted list on 7 March 2018.
