= Lashkar-e-Islam =

Jihadist organization in Pakistan

- لشكرِ اسلام
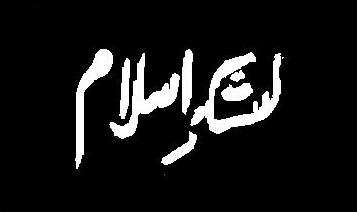
- Flags used by Lashkar-e-Islam
- Founder: Mufti Munir Shakir
- Leaders: Mufti Munir Shakir (2004–2006); Mangal Bagh † (2006–2021); Zala Khan Afridi (2021–2025)
- Dates active: December 2004 – 2025
- Merged into: Ittehad-ul-Mujahideen Pakistan
- Headquarters: Nangarhar
- Ideology: Pan-Islamism; Islamic fundamentalism Deobandi jihadism
- Status: Designated as a terrorist organization by Pakistan
- Size: 500 (2016); Up to 4000 (2024–2025 UN report)

Lashkar-e-Islam (Urdu: لشكرِ اسلام, lit. 'Army of Islam', abbr. LeI), also spelled Laskhar-i Islam, is a Deobandi jihadist militant group that operates in Khyber District, Khyber-Pakhtunkhwa Province, Pakistan and across the border in the neighboring Nangarhar Province of Afghanistan.

LeI was founded in 2004 as a Deobandi militant group in Khyber Agency (today Khyber District) until it formed an alliance with the internationally designated terrorist group Tehrik-e-Taliban Pakistan (TTP) in 2008, amid pressure from Pakistan's counterinsurgency operations against terrorist groups and a desire by the TTP to control the strategic Khyber Pass for attacks on NATO forces in Afghanistan. LeI’s 2008 alliance with the TTP and 2015 partial merger with the group transformed the LeI from a local militant organization into a regional and transnational insurgent organization. Though displaced into Afghanistan in 2014 and weakened by Pakistani and later U.S. military operations, the group maintained a reduced footprint in Afghanistan and Pakistan.

LeI was founded as a splinter from the Promotion of Virtue and Prevention of Vice (AMNAM) in Khyber Agency in 2004 by Munir Shakir who led the group until his 2006 exile by local tribes. Mufti Shakir was replaced by Mangal Bagh, a senior commander under Mufti Shakir, until his death in a roadside bomb attack in late January 2021. A day later, the group announced Zala Khan Afridi as LeI’s new leader with Bagh’s son, Tayyab, as deputy. Tayyab was detained by the Afghan Taliban in December 2022.

The group has also clashed multiple times with other militant outfits such as Islamic State – Khorasan Province. An incident occurred in 2018 where dozens of militants from ISIS and Lashkar-e-Islam had been killed in clashes in Achin, Nazian and Haska Mina districts.

Lel had established good ties with the Pakistani Taliban but never agreed to join together as an organization.

== History ==
=== Background ===
The Khyber Agency (today Khyber District) was one of seven federally-administered agencies on the Pakistan-Afghanistan border and comprises a series of mountains and lush valleys near the historically strategic Khyber Pass. The area is home to Pashtuns (referred to in the region as Pakhtuns), primarily of the Afridi and Shinwari tribes, though members of the Mullaguris, Orakzai, and Shilmanis also inhabit the area. The area played critical roles in the military campaigns of the Persians, Alexander the Great, Kushans, Sassanids, Ghorids, Tatars, Mughals, Durranis, British and Soviets. Following Pakistani independence from the British Raj and the partition, Muhammad Ali Jinnah, founder of the Pakistani state, ordered the withdrawal of all government forces from the tribal areas along the northwest border with Afghanistan, granting the tribes significant autonomy.

=== Establishment ===
Lashkar-e-Islam (LI) and the emergence of militant conflict in Khyber District both trace their origins back to the founding of the organization Promotion of Virtue and Prevention of Vice in the Tirah Valley of Khyber Agency. The organization’s name derives from the Quranic injunction “enjoining (what is) right and forbidding (what is) evil” (Arabic: ٱلْأَمْرْ بِٱلْمَعْرُوفْ وَٱلنَّهْيْ عَنِ ٱلْمُنْكَرْ, romanized: al-amr bi-l-maʿrūf wa-n-nahy ʿani-l-munkar) which represents duties imposed by God in Islam and is the foundation of the Islamic institution of hisbah, the individual or collective duty (depending on the Islamic school of law) to enforce Islamic law. AMNAM was founded in Tirah Valley by the local tribesman Haji Namdar, reportedly under the direction of senior Afghan Taliban commander and key ideologue Ustad Yasir. A key element of AMNAM’s founding, Namdar created an FM radio station and enlisted the controversial radical tribal Pashtun and Deobandi preacher Munir Shakir, to broadcast firebrand Islamic sermons.

AMNAM began to compete with the other Islamic militant group in Khyber Agency, Ansar-ul-Islam (AI, not to be confused with other jihadist groups of the same name). AI was a more moderate Barelvi Sunni revivalist movement led by the Afghan Sufi Pir Saifur Rahman, who had settled in the area. Two separate ideologies, Shakir’s strict Deobandist creed and AI’s moderate Barelvi persuasion, competed in FM radio broadcasts generating a sectarian conflict with both organizations issuing fatwas ordering the other to leave Khyber Agency. As an ideological leader, Mufti Shakir gained a significant following among AMNAM cadres, and eventually left the organization to found Lashkar-e-Islam (LeI) in 2004, taking many of AMNAM’s followers with him.

In 2006, in an attempt to quell the escalating conflict between AI and LeI, a tribal council (jirga) of senior Afridi tribesmen from Khyber Agency decided to expel the two non-native leaders of AI (Pir Saifur Rahman) and LeI (Mufti Shakir) from the Agency. The exile of the leaders only worsened the growing conflict in Khyber Agency as more fanatic commanders, Mehbub-ul-Haq of AI and Mangal Bagh Afridi of LeI, took command of the militant groups and continued to clash. Under the new command of Mangal Bagh, LeI became the most organized and powerful militant group operating in the Agency leaving AI and the remnants of AMNAM altogether weakened.

=== War on terror ===
In 2008, the Pakistani Taliban (TTP) began establishing a presence in Khyber Agency in efforts to both resist Pakistani military counterinsurgency operations and to aid the Afghan Taliban and al-Qaeda in attacks on NATO supply convoys transiting the Torkham border crossing in the Khyber Pass. In an attempt to reassert Pakistani control over the strategic border crossing, stem continued attacks on Peshawar, and under pressure from NATO, the Pakistani military banned LeI, AI, and AMNAM and, through the paramilitary Frontier Corps, launched four military operations in Khyber Agency against TTP, LeI, AI, and AMNAM named Darghlum, Baya Drghlum, Sirat-e-Mustakeem, and Khwakh Ba De Shum. These operations failed to dislodge LeI from the area as Pakistani military and intelligence predominately targeted TTP forces and correctly assessed at the time that LeI had no effective ties to the Pakistani Taliban. Up to late 2008, LeI leader Mangal Bagh had received and declined multiple offers to ally his organization with the TTP, even as both groups found themselves under attack by the Pakistani military in the major Sirat-e-Mustakeem (Arabic: ٱلصِّرَٰطَ ٱلْمُسْتَقِيمَ; lit. ‘Path of Righteousness’) campaign of June 2008 which directly targeted LeI forces in Khyber. Though a militant Islamic group, at the time LeI had a greater focus on the Deobandi revivalist movement (similar to the Afghan Taliban) closing religiously-forbidden music shops and, at times, abducting Christians in Peshawar. During this time, LeI had yet to engage in Islamic terrorism including martyrdom (suicide) operations or bombings of civilian targets, dissimilar to TTP tactics.

The TTP’s presence, though not yet part of a consolidated movement, in Khyber Agency was opposed by locals and the militant groups of LeI, AI, and AMNAM who all clashed with the group on occasion. TTP initially attempted to gain influence in the area by sending the influential leader Ustad Yasir to develop relations between the TTP and Haji Namdar of AMNAM who feared the weakening of his organization’s power in the area. The relationship soured quickly after a TTP suicide attack on a tribal council (jirga) killed over 40 tribal chiefs representing each major faction within Khyber Agency. Further, when it was suspected that Haji Namdar was siding with the Pakistani state over the TTP during Sirat-e-Mustakeem, an TTP operative assassinated Namdar in August 2008.

=== Partnership with Pakistani Taliban ===
TTP, nevertheless determined to control Khyber and take control of the border to disrupt the movement NATO supply convoys, endeavored to forge a positive relationship with the militant groups in the Agency. It was after the conclusion of Sirat-e-Mustakeem in late 2008, that the LeI and its leader, Mangal Bagh, had been pushed closer to the Pakistani Taliban by Pakistan’s offensive operations. LeI began providing TTP militants access to the region and started to receive tactical instruction from TTP trainers, including in the execution of martyrdom operations. Bagh publicly announced LeI’s new image, no longer a localized Islamic anti-crime organization, but a larger Deobandi jihadist group. Bagh addressed the Pakistani government stating “Now it is difficult for us to live in peace. The conflict will not be confined to Khyber Agency alone; rather it will spread to the entire Peshawar region.” === The shift in tactics, likely a result of TTP instructors’ training of LeI fighters, became apparent soon after with a series of joint TTP-LeI suicide attacks against the Pakistani government in Peshawar, NATO supply convoys, and, on 5 April 2010, the American Consulate in Peshawar which killed 50 and wounded over 100. As part of the operation targeting the most well-protected facility in the city, militants from TTP and LeI drove two vehicles up to the consulate, the first of which detonated next to an armored personnel carrier, and the second of which deployed armed fighters who shot at the consulate before detonating suicide vests. The militants had brought ramps to scale the metal barriers of the consulate and would’ve likely succeeded had pieces of the bombed armored personnel carrier not lodged in the barrier. During the same year, joint TTP and LeI operations against NATO supply convoys at in the Khyber Pass destroyed over 700 cargo and military vehicles.

=== Weakening ===
In 2011, LeI militants beheaded a religious scholar of the Zakakhel tribe initiating a surge of violence in the region as the Zakakheli tribesmen joined with AI fighters to attack LeI militants in Khyber Agency, partially weakening LeI’s influence in parts of the Tirah Valley. From 2014 to 2015, the Pakistani military operations Khyber 1 and Zarb-e-Azab forced LeI from Khyber and effectively stunted LeI’s operational capacity, forcing the group’s leaders, militants, and their families to move westward across the border into Nazyan District, Nangarhar Province, Afghanistan. From their new home in Afghanistan, LeI continued to conduct suicide attacks into Pakistan, with financial assistance from Afghan tribal leaders who supported the fight against the Pakistani government, according to some sources. In May 2015, Laskhar-e-Islam announced that it had merged with the Tehrik-e-Taliban Pakistan, though the completeness of the merger remains murky as both groups continued to separately claim individual attacks except for larger, jointly-coordinated attacks. LeI carried out at least 18 attacks in 2016 and 21 in 2017. While in the districts of Nazyan, Shirzad, Shinwar, and Achin, Nangarhar, LeI began to form a loose alliance with the Islamic State of Khorasan Province (ISIS-K) exchanging fighters and conducting joint suicide attacks. The relationship quickly dissolved in a dispute over natural resources. LeI continued to attack the Pakistani state in and near Khyber District in hopes of retaking the territory and returning to its original base of operations.

Beginning in 2015, a year after LeI’s displacement from Khyber, the United States carried out a number of drone strikes killing LeI commanders and, in 2016, reportedly killed LeI leader Mangal Bagh, whom the U.S. had placed a $3 million (USD) bounty on. News of Bagh had subsided until 28 January 2021 when Bagh, his 12-year old daughter, and two bodyguards were killed in a roadside bombing in Nangarhar Province, Afghanistan.

Although Bagh was in Afghanistan at the time of his January 2021 death, it is unclear the state and footprint of the movement since the U.S. withdrawal from Afghanistan and the Afghan Taliban’s establishment of the Islamic Emirate of Afghanistan (IEA). Mangal Bagh was replaced by Zala Khan Afridi as leader of LeI days after Bagh’s death. Khan’s deputy, Tayyab (son of Mangal Bagh, also known as Ajnabi) was detained in Spin Boldak, Kandahar Province, Afghanistan by Afghan Taliban authorities — a move likely intended by the Afghan Taliban government to curry favor from Pakistani authorities as the IEA seeks international recognition.

== Analysis ==
Analysts from the United States Military Academy (USMA, West Point) Combatting Terrorism Center (CTC) suggest that LeI’s development from a localized Islamic militant group to a regional suicide terrorist organization was most directly the result of Pakistani military pressure on the group which encouraged the group to form alliances with the stronger and more dangerous TTP and inherit tactics and operations for regional and transnational terrorist attacks. The same analysts compare this process to the transformation of the Tehrek-e-Nafaz-e-Shariat-e-Mohammadi (TNSM) group from a local militant group in Swat District to a regional terrorist group allied with the Pakistani Taliban under previously absent Pakistani military pressure.

== List of attacks ==
According to the Global Terrorism Database (GTD), an open-source database on terrorist events between 1970 and 2020 produced by the National Consortium for the Study of Terrorist and Responses to Terrorism (START) and the University of Maryland, Lashkar-e-Islam has claimed responsibility for or been attributed to at least 125 separate terrorist attacks as of December 2020.

List of terrorist attacks
Date	Location	Description	Killed	Wounded
01 July 2009	Khyber district, Pakistan	On Wednesday, in Khyber, Federally Administered Tribal Areas, Pakistan, assailants fired on a vehicle carrying a pro-government tribal elder, killing two security guards, one tribal elder, one civilian, wounding one security guard, one civilian, and damaging the vehicle. Lashkar-e-Islam (LEI) claimed responsibility.	4	2
30 July 2009	Bara, Pakistan	On Thursday morning, near Bara tehsil, Khyber Agency, Federally Administered Tribal Areas, Pakistan, members of Lashkar-e-Islami (LI) executed four people. The victims were blindfolded and had their hands tied behind their backs and were lined up outside of a mosque. Four members of the LI fired numerous bullets, killing all four people instantly. The LI claimed responsibility for the attack stating the reason for the attack was because the victims were kidnappers and murderers.	4	0
22 August 2009	Peshawar, Pakistan	On Saturday, in Peshawar, North West Frontier Province, Pakistan, assailants detonated an improvised explosive device targeting a vehicle transporting members of Ansar-ul-Islam, wounding four civilians and damaging several homes. No group claimed responsibility, although it was widely believed Lashkar-e-Islam was responsible.	0	4
23 August 2009	Peshawar, Pakistan	On Sunday, a suicide bomber detonated in Pakistan's northwest city of Peshawar triggered by an apparent feud between rival militant groups. There was retaliatory fire from the house, and in the cross-fire, the suicide bomber blew himself up. In the suicide blast, two ladies and one man were killed and 15 were injured. Eleven houses and several buildings were damaged in the house. No group claimed responsibility, although it was widely believed Lashkar-e-Islam (LEI) was responsible.	4	15
15 September 2009	Hayatabad, Pakistan	On Tuesday, in Hayatabad, North West Frontier, Pakistan, assailants fired rockets at the city, wounding one civilian. No group claimed responsibility, although it was widely believed Lashkar-e-Islami (LEI) was responsible.	0	1
25 December 2009	Khyber district, Pakistan	On Friday around 0300, suspected Taliban militants blew up a government high school in Khyber district, Pakistan. No casualties resulted from the bombing. No group claimed responsibility. It is suspected that the Taliban and militants from the Lashkar-e-Islam (Army of Islam) led by local warlord Mangal Bagh are responsible for the attacks.	0	0
25 December 2009	Khyber district, Pakistan	On Friday around 0300, suspected Taliban militants blew up a government high school in Khyber district, Pakistan. No casualties resulted from the bombing. No group claimed responsibility. It is suspected that the Taliban and militants from the Lashkar-e-Islam (Army of Islam) led by local warlord Mangal Bagh are responsible for the attacks.	0	0
25 December 2009	Bara, Pakistan	On Friday, Lashkar-e-Islam militants kidnapped 18 people who belonged to the Ziauddin Zakhakhel sub-tribe of Bara, Pakistan. The people were making their way to Bara to purchase items for daily use when they were held hostage in the remote area of Bara. Two individuals have been identified as Malook Khan and Abdul Malik. No casualties have been reported. The status of the hostages is unknown.	0	0
08 January 2010	Khyber district, Pakistan	On Friday, a suicide bomber of the rival militant outfit Lashkar-e-Islam from Qambarkhel tribe in Bara, Pakistan blew himself up when he was stopped from entering the gate of the headquarters of the militant outfit Ansar-ul-Islam (AI) in Tirah area of Khyber Agency in Federally Administered Tribal Areas, Pakistan. It is stated that a meeting of the Al shura was in progress and Al "chief" Qazi Mehboobul Haq was at the madrassa. Five people were killed and 11 were injured. The injured were shifted to nearby hospital for immediate medical treatment. No group claimed responsibility for the attack.	6	11
18 January 2010	Landi Kotal, Pakistan	On Monday night at 0300, suspected Lashkar-e-Islam militants blew up a boys' primary school in Ashraf Kalay, Landi Kotal, Khyber Agency, Federally Administered Tribal Areas, Pakistan. All seven rooms of the school were destroyed. No casualties resulted from the blast. No group claimed responsibility. The militant group Lashkar-e-Islam (Army of Islam) has reportedly claimed responsibility for the blast.	0	0
23 February 2010	Khyber district, Pakistan	On Tuesday, a tribesman was shot and killed by Lashkar-e-Islam (LeI) militants in the Tirah Valley area of the Khyber Agency in Pakistan's Federally Administered Tribal Areas. The militia organized the public execution of a tribesman after pronouncing him guilty of double murder at a self-styled Islamic court. Younas confessed to killing his two cousins and he was shot dead according to Sharia law.	1	0
06 March 2010	Bara, Pakistan	On Saturday, in Akakhel, Bara, Federally Administered Tribal Areas, Pakistan, armed assailants fired on and killed a female civilian for not having her face covered while she was in public. No group claimed responsibility, although it was widely believed Lashkar-e-Islam (LEI) was responsible.	1	0
20 March 2010	Bara, Pakistan	On Saturday, in Kamarkhel area in Bara, Federally Administered Tribal Areas, Pakistan, a dozen armed men kidnapped six alleged robbers. The kidnapped persons were identified as Ajmeen, son of Nazeer, Usman, son of Khan Wazir, Meena Gul, son of Tor Ali, Masood, son of Sharif, Lal Muhammad, son of Mohsin Khel and Khan Wazir, son of Lal Akbar Ajmeen, of Orakzai Agency and the rest were residents of Kamarkhel area. The alleged thieves were involved in stealing of telephone cables, medicines, medical equipment and furniture from schools and dispensaries in the area for which the local people were blaming LI men. No group claimed responsibility, although it was widely believed Lashkar-e-Islam (LEI) was responsible. The status of the hostages is unknown.	0	0
17 August 2010	Peshawar, Pakistan	On Tuesday, in Adezai village, in the Peshawar district of Khyber Pakhtunkhwa, Pakistan, in one of two related attacks, 10 Lashkar-e-Islami (LEI) militants raided a mosque and killed two militiamen while they were praying. No damages were reported and LEI claimed responsibility.	2	0
17 August 2010	Peshawar, Pakistan	On Tuesday, in Sarband village, in the Peshawar district of Khyber Pakhtunkhwa, Pakistan, in one of two related attacks, about 100 Lashkar-e-Islami (LEI) militants attacked a police post, which led to a 40 minute gunfight but resulted in no casualties. No damages were reported and LEI militants claimed responsibility.	0	0
22 November 2010	Shalobar, Pakistan	On Monday, in the Shalobar area of Bara tehsil in Khyber Agency, Federally Administered Tribal Areas, Pakistan, two suspected militants, including an alleged commander of Amar bil Maroof wa Nahi Anil Munkar, were killed during an attack by suspected Lashkar-e-Islam (LeI) militants. A civilian nearby was also wounded in the attack. The alleged commander was subsequently identified as Andaz Gul, while his associate was named as Mohammad Nisar. No damages were reported and no group claimed responsibility.	2	0
06 December 2010	Bara, Pakistan	On Monday, in the Sepah area of Bara tehsil, Khyber Agency, Federally Administered Tribal Areas, Pakistan, dozens of suspected Lashkar-e-Islami militants forced their way into the house of a Frontier Constabulary officer, identified as Muhammad Siddiq. Siddiq was kidnapped after his mother and brother were beaten and taken to an unknown location. The status of the hostage is unknown and no group claimed responsibility.	0	0
26 December 2010	Bara, Pakistan	On Sunday, in Shalobar area of Bara, Khyber Pakhtunkhwa, Pakistan, in one of four linked events, Lashkar-e-Islami (LeI) militants kidnapped a trader known as Jumaraz Khan, a supporter of Amr-bil-Maroof (Pakistan). While shifting the kidnapped to the Tirah valley, they were caught by ABWNA militants, the kidnappers were taken to Amr-bil-Maroof prison and Khan was recovered. No casualties were reported and no group claimed responsibility.	0	0
26 December 2010	Bara, Pakistan	On Sunday, in the Shalobar area of Bara, Khyber Pakhtunkhwa, Pakistan, in one of four linked attacks, Lashkar-e-Islami (LeI) militants kidnapped around a dozen tribesmen from Amr-bil-Maroof (Pakistan), including Commander Etabar Shah, and transported them to an unknown location. No casualties were reported and no group claimed responsibility. The status of the hostages is unknown.	0	0
11 March 2011	Peshawar, Pakistan	On Friday, in Shahbkhel village in the Badabher area of Peshawar, Khyber Pakhtunkhwa, Pakistan, unidentified militants detonated an improvised explosive device packed in a water cooler at the Shahabkhel mosque, causing no casualties but slightly damaging the building. The device detonated approximately 90 minutes before the congregation was due to arrive at the mosque for prayers. No group claimed responsibility for the attack; however, a local tribal militia leader attributed the attack to Lashkar-e-Islam (LeI).	0	0
12 April 2011	Spin Qabar, Pakistan	On Tuesday, in Speen Qabar area of Bara tehsil, Khyber, Federally Administered Tribal Areas, Pakistan, suspected Lashkar-e-Islam (LI)militants kidnapped three civilians known as Fazal Shah, Inayat, and Abid, after they refused to fight against Zakhakhel tribe and Tirah-based militant organization Ansarul Islamand (AI). No group claimed responsibility and the status of the hostages is unknown.	0	0
June 2011	Akkakhel, Pakistan	Default date): On Wednesday, in Akakhel, Bara tehsil, Khyber, Federally Administered Tribal Areas, Pakistan, suspected Lashkar-e-Islami (LI/LeI) militants kidnapped a member of the Akakhel Peace Committee identified as Said Marjan from near his home and later shot and killed him. No group has claimed responsibility for the attack.	1	0
07 June 2011	Bara, Pakistan	On Tuesday, in the Bara tehsil of Khyber District, Federally Administered Tribal Areas, Pakistan, Lashkar-e-Islami (LeI) militants kidnapped Nawab, a honey dealer from Mianwali, on charges of spying for the government. Nawab was beheaded later that day and his body was recovered from Syal Khan Killay. A LeI note left at the incident site stated that the victim was working for the government.	1	0
08 June 2011	Moochapura, Pakistan	On Wednesday, in the Tirah Valley area of Khyber District, Federally Administered Tribal Areas, Pakistan, Lashkar-e-Islami (LeI) militants set fire to three houses of their group's rivals. Sources said that militants led by Mangal Bagh torched and demolished the three vacant houses belonging to Janikhel, Mainkhel and Pepal. The attack resulted in no casualties and LeI claimed responsibility by unknown means.	0	0
17 June 2011	Bara, Pakistan	On Friday, in Bara, Khyber Pakhtunkhwa, Pakistan, an employee of the Pakistan Telecommunication Limited, Gul Zameen, was kidnapped near his home by the Lashkar-e Islami militants because he was accused of cooperating with the Akakhel peace committee. The civilian was later beheaded and his body dumped near a filling station. No group claimed responsibility.	1	0
26 October 2011	Bara, Pakistan	On Wednesday, in Bara, Federally Administered Tribal Areas, Pakistan, a volunteer of Akkakhel, an anti-Tehrik-e-Taliban Pakistan tribal militia, was abducted by suspected militants belonging to Lashkar-e-Islami (LeI). His beheaded body was found at a deserted place on 10/27/2011. No group claimed responsibility, although LeI was suspected.	1	0
01 November 2011	Bara, Pakistan	embers of Lashkar-e-Islam attacked the house of Gul Muhammad, a government school teacher in Bara, Khyber agency, Pakistan. The assailants demolished the house and gutted it of anything of value. Gul Muhammad had relocated from the house two years previously and it was empty; there were no reported injuries.	0	0
02 November 2011	Nala, Pakistan	rmed members of Lashkar-e-Islam kidnapped at least four members of Haji Amal Gul's family from Nala village, Khyber agency, Pakistan. Haji Amal Gul was the former commander of Lashkar-e-Islam, but had deserted the organization due to differences with the group's chief. The outcome of the abduction is unknown.	0	0
November 5-6, 2011	Bara, Pakistan	embers of Lashkar-e-Islam destroyed a government-run primary school in Bara, Khyber agency, Pakistan. The assailants bulldozed the building; they also took away the gates, windows, and various rods. There were no reported injuries as a result of the incident.	0	0
10 November 2011	Bara district, Pakistan	At least two dozen members of Lashkar-e-Islam attacked a checkpost for the Akakhel Peace Committee in Daro Adda area of Bara tehsil, Khyber Agency, Pakistan. The assailants opened fire on the members of the peace committee, killing at least four peace volunteers. The assailants fled the scene, evading capture; the specific motive behind the attack is unknown.	5	
13 November 2011	Khyber district, Pakistan	An improvised explosive device detonated at the market in Mastak town, Khyber Agency, Pakistan. The device was hidden on a donkey cart and was remote triggered. At least six people were killed in the attack and another seven were wounded. The victims were tribespeople from the Akakhel and Zakhakhel tribes who had recently formed a peace alliance with the government. No group claimed responsibility for the incident; however, sources suspect that Lashkar-e-Islam orchestrated the event.	6	7
10 December 2011	Bara, Pakistan	The caretaker of the Sufi Baisai Baba shrine was shot and killed by suspected members of Lashkar-e-Islam (Pakistan) in Bara, Khyber, Pakistan. The group had previously shut down the shrine. No claim of responsibility was reported.	1	0
13 December 2011	Bara, Pakistan	At least six people were killed and four more were wounded when members of Lashkar-e-Islam (Pakistan) fired least 30 mortar shells at Bara city, FATA, Pakistan. At least two homes were hit. Those homes belonged to members of a local peace council.	6	4
30 December 2011	Peshawar, Pakistan	Two explosive devices were placed around a government run high school for girls in the suburbs of Peshawar, Khyber, Pakistan. The resulting explosion completely destroyed at least four of the class rooms and damaged a number of others. No claim of responsibility was reported but it is suspected that Lashkar-e-Islam (Pakistan) is responsible. No deaths or injuries were reported.	0	0
30 December 2011	Jamrud, Pakistan	Fifty gunmen, believed to be part of Lashkar-e-Islam, stopped 10 trucks and torched them using petrol gas in the Jaba Khuwar area of Jamrud, Khyber Agency, Federally Administered Tribal Areas (FATA), Pakistan. The trucks were carrying smuggled goods, worth tens of thousands of dollars, to Peshawar from Afghanistan. No casualties were reported, but gunshots were heard after the trucks were set on fire.	0	
17 January 2012	Bara, Pakistan	Assailants attacked Aman Lashkar volunteers in Bara, Khyber Pakhtunkhwa, Pakistan. The volunteers repulsed the attack and killed two assailants. No group claimed responsibility, but sources attributed the incident to Lashkar-e-Islam (Pakistan).	2	0
31 January 2012	Matanui, Pakistan	Assailants kidnapped three Peshawar city Electricity Supply Company (PESCO) workers and ten Water and Power Development Authority (WAPDA) workers near an Afghan refugee camp in Matanui area, Khyber Pakhtunkhwa province, Pakistan. The workers were repairing an electricity pylon when they were kidnapped. The workers were released on May 7, 2013, after 15 months in captivity. No group claimed responsibility for the incident, but police suspected Lashkar-e-Islam (Pakistan).	0	0
01 February 2012	Achini Bala, Pakistan	A driver on a motorbike sped through a police checkpoint near Achini Bala area, Khyber Pakhtunkhwa province, Pakistan. The police then chased after the driver, who escaped. The police captured the driver's bicycle, which was rigged with explosives. No group claimed responsibility, but police attributed the attack to Lashkar-e-Islam (Pakistan).	0	0
03 February 2012	Achini Payan, Pakistan	An explosives-laden vehicle detonated in Achini Payan area, Khyber Pakhtunkhwa province, Pakistan. Four people were killed and four wounded in the attack. The target, Astana Gul, was not present at the time. No group claimed responsibility for the incident, but sources suspected Lashkar-e-Islam (Pakistan). It is believed that Lashkar-e-Islam (Pakistan) targeted Gul to warn people against leaving the group after Gul left to join rival group Ansar-ul-Islam.	4	4
03 February 2012	Motharay, Pakistan	A mosque was blown up in Motharay area, Tirah Valley, Federally Administered Tribal Areas (FATA), Pakistan. There were no casualties, as the mosque was empty at the time. No group claimed responsibility for the incident, but sources suspected that the Ziauddin sub-branch of the Zakhakhel Tribe was being targeted by rival Lashkar-e-Islam.	0	0
19 February 2012	Nari Baba, Pakistan	An explosive device detonated at a pro-government militia checkpoint in Nari Baba area, Khyber Agency, Federally Administered Tribal Areas (FATA), Pakistan. Nine militia members were killed in the attack, and another four were injured. This was one of two attacks at the checkpoint on this date. No group claimed responsibility for the incident, but sources suspected Lashkar-e-Islam (Pakistan).	9	4
19 February 2012	Nari Baba, Pakistan	Assailants opened fire on a pro-government militia checkpoint in Nari Baba area, Khyber Agency, Federally Administered Tribal Areas (FATA), Pakistan. No militia members were reported injured; however, two attackers were killed in the return fire. This was one of two attacks at the checkpoint on this date. No group claimed responsibility for the incident, but sources suspected Lashkar-e-Islam (Pakistan).	2	0
01 May 2012	Sarband, Pakistan	Assailants attacked the Manzoor Saheed Checkpost in Sarband village, Peshawar, Khyber Pakhtunkhwa, Pakistan. No casualties were reported in the assault. No group claimed responsibility for the attack.	0	0
14 May 2012	Bara, Pakistan	Assailants attacked a security checkpost in Bara, Khyber Pakhtunkhwa, Pakistan. Two soldiers were injured and eight assailants killed in the ensuing gunfire. Lashkar-e-Islam (Pakistan) claimed responsibility for the attack.	8	2
25 May 2012	Akka Khel, Pakistan	Assailants planted and detonated explosives at the residence of a local peace activist in Akka Khel, Khyber Pakhtunkhwa, Pakistan. The activist was unharmed; however, the house was seriously damaged in the blast. No group claimed responsibility for the incident; however, local sources attributed it to Lashkar-e-Islam (Pakistan).	0	0
04 June 2012	Bara, Pakistan	Assailants threw hand grenades and explosives at the Akakhel Amn Lashkar paramilitary office in Bara, Khyber Pakhtunkhwa, Pakistan. Although the attack happened at night, members of the Akakhel Amn Lashkar were on site at the time of the incident; at least 14 people were injured in the blast, and seven assailants were killed in return fire. Lashkar-e-Islam (Pakistan) claimed responsibility for the incident.	7	14
11 June 2012	Mastak, Pakistan	An explosive device detonated in Mastak village, Federally Administered Tribal Areas, Pakistan. The blast struck a civilian vehicle, killing a local tribal member. This was one of two bombings at the same location within a short period of time. No group claimed responsibility for the incidents; however, sources suspect that Lashkar-e-Islam (Pakistan) was involved.	1	0
11 June 2012	Mastak, Pakistan	An explosive device detonated targeting a group of Zakhakhel tribal lashkar volunteers who were responding to an earlier explosion in Mastak village, Federally Administered Tribal Areas, Pakistan. Two members of the lashkar were killed and six others were injured in the attack. This was one of two related attacks in Mastak on this day. No group claimed responsibility for the incident; however, local sources suspected that Lashkar-e-Islam (Pakistan) was involved.	2	6
26 June 2012	Peshawar, Pakistan	Assailants abducted Mohammad Faheemur Rahman and three of his associates in Peshawar city, Khyber Pakhtunkhwa province, Pakistan. Rahman, an anti-Taliban, pro-government militia leader, and his three associates were shot and killed; their bodies were discovered on the outskirts of Peshawar on June 27, 2012. Both Tehrik-i-Taliban Pakistan (TTP) and Lashkar-e-Islam (Pakistan) claimed responsibility for the incident.	4	0
14 July 2012	Zakhtan, Pakistan	Assailants set three houses on fire in Zakhtan area, Federally Administered Tribal Areas, Pakistan. The attackers targeted the homes of Zakhakhel elders, who were not home at the time of the incident. Lashkar-e-Islam (Pakistan) claimed responsibility for the attack.	0	0
06 August 2012	Bara, Pakistan	An explosive device detonated prematurely while being planted in Bara, Khyber Pakhtunkhwa, Pakistan. Five assailants, including commander Syed Rehman, were killed in the blast. No group claimed responsibility for the incident; however, authorities attributed the attempted attack to Lashkar-e-Islam (Pakistan).	5	0
11 August 2012	Meelwat, Pakistan	Assailants attacked the Akkakhel Peace Committee's compound in Meelwat area, Bara tehsil, Federally Administered Tribal Areas, Pakistan. Three peace committee volunteers were killed in the attack. Additionally, one peace volunteer was kidnapped. There is no information available with regards to an outcome for the kidnapping. Lashkar-e-Islam (Pakistan) claimed responsibility for this incident.	3	
12 August 2012	Sheikhan, Pakistan	Three assailants attempted to take a vehicle in Sheikhan village, Khyber Pakhtunkhwa province, Pakistan. Police opened fire on the assailants, injuring one. No group claimed responsibility for this incident; however, sources attributed it to Lashkar-e-Islam (Pakistan).	0	1
06 September 2012	Malik Din Khel, Pakistan	Assailants fired a mortar shell at a civilian house in Malik Din Khel area, Khyber Agency, Federally Administered Tribal Areas, Pakistan. Eight people were injured in the attack. No group claimed responsibility for the incident, but sources attributed it to Lashkar-e-Islam (Pakistan).	0	8
08 September 2012	Bara, Pakistan	An explosive device went off near the home of Sohail Khan in Bara village, Khyber Pakhtunkhwa province, Pakistan. No one was injured in the attack; however, the house was destroyed. No group claimed responsibility for the incident, but sources attributed it to Lashkar-e-Islam (Pakistan).	0	0
28 September 2012	Skaikhan, Pakistan	An explosive device was found and defused in Skaikhan village, Khyber Pakhtunkhwa province, Pakistan. This was one of four devices planted in Skaikhan village on September 28, 2012. No group claimed responsibility for the incident; however, police suspected Lashkar-e-Islam (Pakistan).	0	0
28 September 2012	Skaikhan, Pakistan	An explosive device was found and defused in Skaikhan village, Khyber Pakhtunkhwa province, Pakistan. This was one of four devices planted in Skaikhan village on September 28, 2012. No group claimed responsibility for the incident; however, police suspected Lashkar-e-Islam (Pakistan).	0	0
28 September 2012	Skaikhan, Pakistan	An explosive device was found and defused in Skaikhan village, Khyber Pakhtunkhwa province, Pakistan. This was one of four devices planted in Skaikhan village on September 28, 2012. No group claimed responsibility for the incident; however, police suspected Lashkar-e-Islam (Pakistan).	0	0
28 September 2012	Skaikhan, Pakistan	An explosive device detonated remotely while an explosives expert defused a nearby device in Skaikhan village, Khyber Pakhtunkhwa province, Pakistan. The expert was killed in the blast. This was one of four devices planted in Skaikhan village on September 28, 2012. No group claimed responsibility for the incident; however, police suspected Lashkar-e-Islam (Pakistan).	1	0
06 October 2012	Bara, Pakistan	Gunmen attacked an Akakhel Peace Lashkar patrol in Bara, Khyber Pakhtunkhwa, Pakistan. Five volunteers were killed and four other members injured in the attack. Additionally, six gunmen were killed by retaliatory action. No group claimed responsibility for the incident; however, sources attributed the attack to Lashkar-e-Islam (Pakistan).	11	4
09 October 2012	Landi Kotal, Pakistan	An explosive device detonated in Landi Kotal town, Federally Administered Tribal Areas, Pakistan. The device exploded as the assailants were attempting to plant it, killing eight of them and injuring six more individuals. No group claimed responsibility for the incident; however, sources attributed it to Lashkar-e-Islam (Pakistan).	8	6
11 October 2012	Zakha Khel, Pakistan	An explosive device planted near a Tawheedul Islam (TI) checkpoint detonated in Zakha Khel area, Federally Administered Tribal Areas, Pakistan. One TI volunteer was killed and two injured. No group claimed responsibility for the incident; however, officials attributed it to Lashkar-e-Islam (Pakistan).	1	2
22 November 2012	Landi Kotal, Pakistan	Members of the Lashkar-e-Islam (Pakistan) attacked a peace militia checkpost Landi Kotal, Federally Administered Tribal Areas, Pakistan. A Tauheedul Islam peace militia volunteer was injured in the attack. The assailants gained control of the checkpost for a brief period before militia members responded and recaptured the checkpost.	0	1
29 December 2012	Bara, Pakistan	An assailant armed with a sniper rifle opened fire on a military checkpoint at the Kohi Sher Haider Government Degree College in Bara tehsil, Khyber Pakhtunkhwa province, Pakistan. A soldier was killed in the attack. No group claimed responsibility for the incident; however, sources attributed the attack to Lashkar-e-Islam (Pakistan).	1	0
15 January 2013	Bara, Pakistan	Assailants opened fire and threw grenades at a Frontier Corps (FC) checkpoint in Bara town, Khyber Pakhtunkhwa, Pakistan. This was one of four attacks on checkpoints in the same area. At least four assailants and nine soldiers were killed across all four attacks, including at least three FC members that were abducted and later beheaded. In addition, at least 28 soldiers and an unknown number of assailants were injured. Lashkar-e-Islam (Pakistan) claimed responsibility for the incidents.	4	7
15 January 2013	Bara, Pakistan	Assailants opened fire and threw grenades at a Frontier Corps (FC) checkpoint in Bara town, Khyber Pakhtunkhwa, Pakistan. This was one of four attacks on checkpoints in the same area. At least four assailants and nine soldiers were killed across all four attacks, including at least three FC members that were abducted and later beheaded. In addition, at least 28 soldiers and an unknown number of assailants were injured. Lashkar-e-Islam (Pakistan) claimed responsibility for the incidents.	3	7
15 January 2013	Bara, Pakistan	Assailants opened fire and threw grenades at a Frontier Corps (FC) checkpoint in Bara town, Khyber Pakhtunkhwa, Pakistan. This was one of four attacks on checkpoints in the same area. At least four assailants and nine soldiers were killed across all four attacks, including at least three FC members that were abducted and later beheaded. In addition, at least 28 soldiers and an unknown number of assailants were injured. Lashkar-e-Islam (Pakistan) claimed responsibility for the incidents.	3	7
15 January 2013	Bara, Pakistan	Assailants opened fire and threw grenades at a Frontier Corps (FC) checkpoint in Bara town, Khyber Pakhtunkhwa, Pakistan. This was one of four attacks on checkpoints in the same area. At least four assailants and nine soldiers were killed across all four attacks, including at least three FC members that were abducted and later beheaded. In addition, at least 28 soldiers and an unknown number of assailants were injured. Lashkar-e-Islam (Pakistan) claimed responsibility for the incidents.	3	7
15 January 2013	Bara, Pakistan	Assailants stormed a Frontier Corps (FC) member's private residence in Bara tehsil, Khyber Pakhtunkhwa province, Pakistan. The FC member was not home at the time of the attack; however, the assailants killed his father and four brothers. Officials attribute the incident to Lashkar-e-Islam (Pakistan).	5	0
23 January 2013	Hayatabad, Pakistan	Three mortars were fired at Frontier Corps (FC) headquarters in Hayatabad, Khyber Pakhtunkhwa province, Pakistan. The number of casualties from the attack is unknown. No group claimed responsibility for the incident; however, police suspect Lashkar-e-Islam (Pakistan).	0	0
24 January 2013	Hayatabad, Pakistan	Perpetrators fired four mortars into a residential area of Hayatabad, Khyber Pakhtunkhwa province, Pakistan. Police believe the target of the attack was meant to be the Frontier Corps Headquarters. Three children were injured in the attack. No group claimed responsibility for the incident; however, authorities suspect Lashkar-e-Islam (Pakistan).	0	3
18 February 2013	Peshawar, Pakistan	Two suicide bombers dressed as police officers attacked a meeting of officials at a government office in Peshawar city, Khyber Pakhtunkhwa province, Pakistan. The assailants engaged in gunfire with security personnel for 20 minutes before detonating. At least seven security personal and civilians were killed and six other people were injured in the attack. No group claimed responsibility; however, sources attributed the incident to Lashkar-e-Islam (Pakistan).	9	6
24 February 2013	Bara, Pakistan	Assailants attacked security forces in Bara Tehsil, Khyber Pakhtunkhwa province, Pakistan. Six of the assailants were killed in the attack. No group claimed responsibility for the attack; however, the security forces attributed the attack to Lashkar-e-Islam (LI).	6	0
02 March 2013	Bara, Pakistan	An explosive device along a road detonated in the Sheen Qamar area of Bara tehsil, Khyber Pakhtunkhwa province, Pakistan. Three people were injured and a vehicle was damaged in the explosion. No group claimed responsibility for the incident; however, Lashkar-e-Islam (Pakistan) has been keeping supplies from reaching the area for more than two years.	0	3
08 March 2013	Bara, Pakistan	Perpetrators kidnapped at least 50 individuals in Bara tehsil, Khyber Pakhtunkhwa province, Pakistan. The victims were kidnapped after their children were vaccinated against polio. The individuals were only released after they agreed to pay a fee for having received the immunizations; all 50 captives were eventually released. Lashkar-e-Islam (Pakistan) was responsible for the incident.	0	0
21 March 2013	Jalozai, Pakistan	An explosives-laden vehicle detonated at an Afghan refugee camp near a World Food Programme food distribution point in Jalozai area, Khyber Pakhtunkhwa, Pakistan. At least 17 people were killed and 30 others were injured in the blast. No group has claimed responsibility for the incident; however, sources speculate that Lashkar-e-Islam (Pakistan) was involved.	17	30
28 March 2013	Peshawar, Pakistan	Assailants shot and killed a civilian in Peshawar city, Khyber Pakhtunkhwa province, Pakistan. The victim had been a caretaker at the historic Akhund Derwaiza shrine. There was no claim of responsibility for this attack; however, sources indicate that it bore the hallmarks of Lashkar-e-Islam (LeI).	1	0
16 April 2013	Akka Khel, Pakistan	Security forces discovered and defused five explosive devices planted in Akka Khel, Khyber Pakhtunkhwa, Pakistan. The devices were discovered by soldiers shortly after they repelled an attack on a nearby checkpost. No group claimed responsibility for the incident.	0	0
03 June 2013	Akka Khel, Pakistan	Assailants kidnapped 60 Jirga members in Akka Khel, Khyber Pakhtunkhwa, Pakistan. The members had been sent to the area to negotiate an end to the campaign ban there. At least one of the captives was beheaded on June 7, 2013. On June 30, 2013, at least 16 others were released; however, the fate of the remaining captives is unknown. No group claimed responsibility for the kidnapping; however, the incident was attributed to Lashkar-e-Islam (Pakistan).	1	
15 September 2013	Peshawar, Pakistan	Assailants kidnapped two children from Sheikhan village, Peshawar district, Khyber Pakhtunkhwa province, Pakistan. The whereabouts of the victims are unknown. Lashkar-e-Islam (Pakistan) claimed responsibility for the abduction in a video, accusing the children of working with the government.		
21 November 2013	Bara, Pakistan	Assailants kidnapped 11 teachers after mistaking them for Polio campaign workers in Bara village, Khyber Pakhtunkhwa province, Pakistan. The teachers were released on November 26, 2013. No group claimed responsibility; however, sources attributed the incident to Lashkar-e-Islam (Pakistan).	0	0
11 February 2014	Bara, Pakistan	Assailants abducted Mula Jan, a Zakhakhel tribal member, from Merikhel area, Bara tehsil, Khyber Pakhtunkhwa province, Pakistan. Jan was executed around February 14, 2014. No group claimed responsibility for the incident; however, sources attributed the attack to Lashkar-e-Islam (Pakistan).	1	0
15 February 2014	Bara, Pakistan	An explosive device detonated inside Mateen's home in Bara tehsil, Khyber Pakhtunkhwa province, Pakistan. Mateen, the brother of a member of the Akka Khel Aman Lashkar, was unharmed, but the house was destroyed in the blast. No group claimed responsibility for the incident; however, government officials attributed it to Lashkar-e-Islam (Pakistan).	0	0
01 March 2014	Jamrud, Pakistan	An explosive device detonated near a polio team in Jamrud, Khyber Pakhtunkhwa, Pakistan. This was one of two explosions targeting the polio team on this date; the second blast targeted first responders arriving at the scene of this first attack. Twelve Khyber Khassadar Force members, who were providing security for the team, were killed and 10 other people were injured across both attacks. No group claimed responsibility for the incidents; however, authorities attributed the attack to Lashkar-e-Islam (Pakistan).	6	5
01 March 2014	Jamrud, Pakistan	An explosive device detonated near a polio team in Jamrud, Khyber Pakhtunkhwa, Pakistan. This was one of two explosions targeting the polio team on this date; this blast was targeting first responders arriving on the scene of the first attack. Twelve Khyber Khassadar Force members, who were providing security for the team, were killed and 10 other people were injured across both attacks. No group claimed responsibility for the incidents; however, authorities attributed the attack to Lashkar-e-Islam (Pakistan).	6	5
15 March 2014	Badaber, Pakistan	Assailants abducted at least 18 Shinwari tribal members in Badaber village, Khyber Pakhtunkhwa province, Pakistan. One of the hostages escaped shortly after the abduction and at least 11 of the hostages were released on March 18, 2014. The status of the remaining victims is unknown. No group claimed responsibility for the incident; however, sources attributed the abduction to Lashkar-e-Islam (Pakistan).		
18 April 2014	Shaikhan, Pakistan	Assailants opened fire on a military convoy in Shaikhan area, Khyber Pakhtunkhwa province, Pakistan. One soldier was killed and three others were wounded in the attack. No group claimed responsibility for the incident; however, sources suspected that Lashkar-e-Islam (Pakistan) was involved in the attack.	1	3
20 April 2014	Peshawar, Pakistan	Assailants attempted to plant an explosive device near a police checkpost in Saifen neighborhood, Peshawar city, Khyber Pakhtunkhwa province, Pakistan. Authorities intervened and safely defused the explosive device. No group claimed responsibility for the incident; however, sources attributed the attack to Lashkar-e-Islam (Pakistan).	0	0
27 April 2014	Landi Kotal, Pakistan	An explosive device detonated near a Tawheed-ul-Islam Peace Committee vehicle in Zakakhel neighborhood, Landi Kotal town, Federally Administered Tribal Areas, Pakistan. At least three members were injured in the blast. No group claimed responsibility; however, sources suspect that Lashkar-e-Islam (Pakistan) was behind the attack.	0	3
22 June 2014	Khyber district, Pakistan	Assailants opened fire on a Pakistan Armed Forces convoy in Bara subdistrict, Khyber district, Federally Administered Tribal Areas, Pakistan. Two assailants were killed and two others were wounded in the attack. No group claimed responsibility for the incident; however, sources attributed the attack to Lashkar-e-Islam (Pakistan).	2	2
08 July 2014	Achini, Pakistan	Assailants attacked civilians in Achini area, Khyber Pakhtunkhwa province, Pakistan. The assailants attempted to kidnap a resident, but opened fire when people refused to surrender the individual. Three civilians were killed and one other person was wounded in the attack. No group claimed responsibility for the incident; however, sources attributed the attack to Lashkar-e-Islam (Pakistan).	3	1
12 September 2014	Peshawar, Pakistan	Assailants kidnapped a police officer in Patang chowk, Peshawar city, Khyber Pakhtunkhwa province, Pakistan. The officer escaped, unharmed, the following day. No group claimed responsibility; however, sources attributed the incident to Lashkar-e-Islam.	0	0
13 September 2014	Peshawar, Pakistan	Assailants abducted a police constable in Peshawar city, Khyber Pakhtunkhwa province, Pakistan. The constable was beheaded the same day. No group claimed responsibility for the incident; however, sources attributed the attack to Lashkar-e-Islam (Pakistan).	1	0
14 September 2014	Dogra, Pakistan	Assailants opened fire on a convoy of security personnel in Dogra area, Federally Administered Tribal Areas, Pakistan. In addition to three assailants, two children were killed and one assailant was wounded in the attack. No group claimed responsibility for the incident; however, sources attributed the attack to Lashkar-e-Islam (Pakistan).	5	1
22 September 2014	Shalobar, Pakistan	Assailants kidnapped Gulab Gul in Shalobar village, Federally Administered Tribal Areas, Pakistan. Gul, the principal and owner of Gul Public School, was released unharmed on September 27, 2014. No group claimed responsibility; however, sources attributed the attack to Lashkar-e-Islam (Pakistan).	0	0
11 October 2014	Unknown, Pakistan	Two assailants attempted to plant a roadside bomb in order to target Munshi Afridi, the commander of Touheed-ul-Islam (TuI), at an unknown location in Pakistan. The two assailants were killed after TI members responded to their bombing attempt. No group claimed responsibility; however, sources attributed the incident to Lashkar-e-Islam (Pakistan).	2	0
15 October 2014	Tirah, Pakistan	A suicide bomber detonated an explosive device at a jirga of the Touheed-ul-Islam (TuI) peace militia in Pir Mela area, Tirah valley, Federally Administered Tribal Areas, Pakistan. In addition to the bomber, seven people were killed and 15 wounded in the blast; the victims included Aman Lashkar members and civilians. No group claimed responsibility for the incident; however, sources suspected Lashkar-e-Islam (Pakistan), who denied involvement.	8	15
22 October 2014	Sipah, Pakistan	Assailants attacked a Frontier Corps (FC) checkpost in Sipah area, Federally Administered Tribal Areas, Pakistan. Two soldiers were killed and at least one other was injured in the assault. No group claimed responsibility for the incident; however, a source attributed the attack to Lashkar-e-Islam (Pakistan).	2	1
23 October 2014	Aka Khel, Pakistan	Assailants attacked security personnel in a market in Aka Khel area, Khyber Pakhtunkhwa province, Pakistan. One soldier was wounded in the attack. No group claimed responsibility for the incident; however, sources attributed it to Lashkar-e-Islam (Pakistan).	0	1
27 October 2014	Bara district, Pakistan	Explosive devices detonated at a school in Hakim Khan Kili village, Bara district, Khyber Pakhtunkhwa province, Pakistan. There were no reported casualties, but the school was damaged in the blast. No group claimed responsibility for the attack; however, Pakistani officials attributed the incident to Lashkar-e-Islam (Pakistan).	0	0
01 November 2014	Orakzai district, Pakistan	Assailants attacked a security checkpost in Orakzai district, Federally Administered Tribal Areas, Pakistan. Twenty assailants and eight soldiers were killed in the ensuing clash, while 11 assailants and five soldiers were wounded. No group claimed responsibility for the incident; however, sources attributed the attack to Lashkar-e-Islam (Pakistan).	28	16
08 November 2014	Bara district, Pakistan	At least 50 assailants attacked a security forces checkpost in Bara district, Khyber Pakhtunkhwa province, Pakistan. Seventeen assailants were killed in the ensuing clash. No group claimed responsibility for the incident; however, sources attributed the attack to both Lashkar-e-Islam (Pakistan) and Tehrik-i-Taliban Pakistan (TTP).	17	
11 November 2014	Orakzai district, Pakistan	Assailants opened fire on a Frontier Corps (FC) checkpost in Sherin Darra area, Orakzai agency, Federally Administered Tribal Areas, Pakistan. At least 17 people, including two FC soldiers and 15 assailants, were killed and six FC soldiers were injured in the ensuing clash. No group claimed responsibility; however, sources attributed the incident to both Tehrik-i-Taliban Pakistan (TTP) and Lashkar-e-Islam (Pakistan).	17	6
11 November 2014	Aka Khel, Pakistan	Assailants attacked a security forces checkpost in Khushab Darra area, Aka Khel tehsil, Khyber agency, Federally Administered Tribal Areas, Pakistan. Thirteen assailants were killed and 12 others were injured in the ensuing clash. No group claimed responsibility; however, sources attributed the incident to both Lashkar-e-Islam (Pakistan) and Tehrik-i-Taliban Pakistan (TTP).	13	12
02 December 2014	Khyber district, Pakistan	Assailants stormed a Touheed-ul-Islam (TuI) checkpost in Khyber district, Federally Administered Tribal Areas, Pakistan. At least seven assailants were killed in the ensuing clash. No group claimed responsibility for the incident; however, sources suspected that Lashkar-e-Islam (Pakistan) was involved.	7	
03 February 2015	Nari Baba, Pakistan	An explosive device detonated near Touheed-ul-Islam (TuI) peace committee members in Nari Baba, Federally Administered Tribal Areas, Pakistan. At least three Tul members were killed and another was injured in the blast. Lashkar-e-Islam (Pakistan) claimed responsibility for the incident.	3	1
08 February 2015	Nari Baba, Pakistan	An explosive device detonated near an Aman Lashkars camp in Nari Baba area, Federally Administered Tribal Areas, Pakistan. Three Aman Lashkars members were killed and five others were wounded in the blast. Lashkar-e-Islam (Pakistan) claimed responsibility for the incident.	3	5
14 February 2015	Landi Kotal, Pakistan	Assailants opened fire on a vehicle carrying two polio vaccination workers in Landi Kotal area, Federally Administered Tribal Areas, Pakistan. The vehicle's driver was killed and a polio worker was injured in the attack. Lashkar-e-Islam (Pakistan) claimed responsibility for the incident.	1	1
12 March 2015	Peshawar, Pakistan	Assailants opened fire on a security checkpost in Gora Qabristan neighborhood, Peshawar city, Khyber Pakhtunkhwa province, Pakistan. A civilian and an assailant were killed and seven people, including at least one soldier, were injured in the attack. Lashkar-e-Islam (Pakistan) claimed responsibility for the incident.	2	7
28 March 2015	Mastak, Pakistan	Assailants opened fire on a Pakistan Army post in Mastak, Federally Administered Tribal Areas, Pakistan. At least 15 assailants were killed and four soldiers were wounded in the ensuing clash. Lashkar-e-Islam (Pakistan) claimed responsibility for the attack.	15	4
09 July 2015	Bara, Pakistan	An explosive device detonated at a school in Malik Deenkhel area, Bara tehsil, Federally Administered Tribal Areas, Pakistan. There were no reported casualties in the attack. Lashkar-e-Islam (Pakistan) claimed responsibility for the incident.	0	0
06 September 2015	Khyber district, Pakistan	Assailant abducted 13 Touheed-ul-Islam (TuI) militia members in Khyber district, Federally Administered Tribal Areas, Pakistan. Five of the hostages were killed and their bodies were discovered on September 7, 2015. Two of the victims were released while the remaining six hostages were killed and their bodies were discovered on September 9, 2015. Lashkar-e-Islam (Pakistan) claimed responsibility for the attack.	11	0
07 October 2015	Bar Qambar Khel, Pakistan	An explosive device detonated at Hamza Public School in Bar Qambar Khel, Khyber district, Federally Administered Tribal Areas, Pakistan. There were no reported casualties in the blast. Lashkar-e-Islam (Pakistan) claimed responsibility for the attack.	0	0
19 January 2016	Jamrud, Pakistan	A suicide bomber detonated an explosives-laden motorcycle at a Khassadars checkpoint in Jamrud, Khyber Pakhtunkhwa province, Pakistan. In addition to the bomber, at least 11 people were killed and 31 others were injured in the blast; the victims included soldiers, journalists, and civilians. Lashkar-e-Islam (Pakistan) and the Tehrik-i-Taliban Pakistan (TTP) separately claimed responsibility for the attack.	12	31
16 March 2016	Peshawar, Pakistan	An explosive device planted on a bus transporting government employees detonated along Sunehri Masjid Road in Peshawar, Khyber Pakhtunkhwa, Pakistan. At least 16 people were killed and 50 others were injured in the blast. Lashkar-e-Islam (Pakistan) claimed responsibility and stated that the attack was carried out in retaliation for death sentences given to armed group members. Separately, Majlis-e-Lashkari also claimed responsibility and stated that the incident was carried out in revenge for recent military operations.	16	50
02 July 2016	Zaoddin Zakhakhel, Pakistan	Assailants shot and killed a former Touheed-ul-Islam (TuI) member in Zaoddin Zakhakhel, Bara subdistrict, Federally Administered Tribal Areas, Pakistan. Lashkar-e-Islam (Pakistan) claimed responsibility for the attack.	1	0
26 October 2016	Sikandar Khel, Pakistan	Assailants shot and killed a polio worker in Ghundi, Federally Administered Tribal Areas, Pakistan. Lashkar-e-Islam (Pakistan) claimed responsibility for the attack. Sources also attributed the incident to Tehrik-i-Taliban Pakistan (TTP).	1	0
05 November 2016	Khyber district, Pakistan	Assailants armed with rockets and firearms attacked a joint Frontier Corps (FC) and Khassadars checkpost along Torkham Road in Takhta Baig, Khyber district, Federally Administered Tribal Areas, Pakistan. At least one soldier was killed and three others were injured in the assault. Lashkar-e-Islam (Pakistan) claimed responsibility and stated that the attack was carried out in revenge for the detainment of tribal members. Sources also suspected that the incident was carried out by Tehrik-i-Taliban Pakistan (TTP).	1	3
16 November 2016	Khamarkhel, Pakistan	Assailants opened fire on Touheed-ul-Islam (TuI) members in Kamarkhel, Federally Administered Tribal Areas, Pakistan. At least five members were killed and another was injured in the assault. Lashkar-e-Islam (Pakistan) claimed responsibility for the attack.	5	1
22 May 2017	Aka Khel, Pakistan	An explosive device detonated near an Aman Lashkars vehicle in Aka Khel, Khyber district, Federally Administered Tribal Areas, Pakistan. At least five people, including four Aman Lashkars members and one Levies Forces officer, were killed in the blast. Lashkar-e-Islam (Pakistan) claimed responsibility for the attack.	5	0
16 July 2017	Malakdin Khel, Pakistan	An explosive device detonated near a Frontier Corps (FC) patrol at Kohi Chowk in Malakdin Khel, Bara subdistrict, Federally Administered Tribal Areas, Pakistan. At least two soldiers were injured in the blast. Lashkar-e-Islam (Pakistan) claimed responsibility for the attack.	0	2
23 July 2017	Speen Qabar, Pakistan	An explosive device detonated near a Frontier Corps (FC) patrol in Speen Qabar, Khyber district, Federally Administered Tribal Areas, Pakistan. At least one soldier was killed and another soldier was injured in the blast. Lashkar-e-Islam (Pakistan) claimed responsibility for the attack.	1	1
23 September 2017	Rajgal, Pakistan	Assailants in Afghanistan opened fire on a Pakistan Army post in Rajgal, Bara subdistrict, Federally Administered Tribal Areas, Pakistan. At least four people, including one soldier and three assailants, were killed and two other assailants were injured in the ensuing clash. No group claimed responsibility; however, sources attributed the attack to Lashkar-e-Islam (Pakistan).	4	2
24 November 2017	Hayatabad, Pakistan	A suicide bomber detonated an explosives-laden motorcycle near the vehicle of Ashraf Nur close to Tatara Park in Hayatabad, Khyber Pakhtunkhwa, Pakistan. In addition to the assailant, at least two people, including Nur, a Peshawar City Police Additional Inspector General, and one of his guards, were killed and six other people were injured in the blast. Lashkar-e-Islam (Pakistan), the Khorasan Chapter of the Islamic State, and Lashkar-e-Jhangvi all separately claimed responsibility for the attack.	3	6
04 December 2020	Nazian Darra, Afghanistan	Assailants attacked outposts of pro-Afghan government local militias in Nazian Darra, Nangarhar, Afghanistan. Four pro-government militia members and 10 assailants were killed and four militia members and an unknown number of assailants were injured in the ensuing clash. No group claimed responsibility for the incident; however, sources attributed the attack to Lashkar-e-Islam (Pakistan).	14	4
Source: START (National Consortium for the Study of Terrorism and Reponses to Terrorism). (2022). Global Terrorism Database, 1970 – 2020.

== See also ==
- List of Deobandi organizations
- Pakistani Taliban
